= Great Britain at the 2020 Summer Paralympics =

- IPC code: GBR
- NPC: British Paralympic Association

in Tokyo August 24, 2021 – September 5, 2021
- Competitors: 227 in 19 sports
- Flag bearers (opening): Ellie Simmonds; John Stubbs
- Flag bearer (closing): David Smith
- Medals Ranked 2nd: Gold 41 Silver 38 Bronze 45 Total 124

Summer Paralympics appearances (overview)
- 1960; 1964; 1968; 1972; 1976; 1980; 1984; 1988; 1992; 1996; 2000; 2004; 2008; 2012; 2016; 2020; 2024

Great Britain competed in the 2020 Summer Paralympics in Tokyo, Japan. Originally scheduled to take place between 21 August and 6 September 2020, the Games were postponed to 24 August to 5 September 2021 as a result of the COVID-19 pandemic. British athletes have competed at all sixteen consecutive Summer Paralympics since 1960.

Sarah Storey, competing in her eighth Paralympics, won Great Britain's first gold medal of the Games, on the first day of competition, in the women's individual pursuit C5 cycling. It was Storey's fifteenth Paralympic gold medal, leaving her one behind Mike Kenny's British record of sixteen. On 31 August, Storey won her second gold of the Games in the Women's C-5 road time trial, winning her sixteenth Paralympic gold medal, and becoming Great Britain's most successful ever Paralympian, matching Mike Kenny's record of 16 gold medals, but exceeding his record in silver and bronze medals. Days later, Storey's third gold of the Games in the women's C4–5 road race moved her clear in the national all-time list on 17 gold medals.

== Medallists ==
The following competitors won medals at the Games for Great Britain.

Medal	Name	Sport	Event	Date
Gold	Sarah Storey	Cycling	Women's individual pursuit C5	25 August
Gold	Jaco van Gass	Cycling	Men's individual pursuit C3	26 August
Gold	Lee Pearson	Equestrian	Individual championship test grade II	26 August
Gold	Tully Kearney	Swimming	Women's 100 metre freestyle S5	26 August
Gold	Maisie Summers-Newton	Swimming	Women's 200 metre individual medley SM6	26 August
Gold	Piers Gilliver	Wheelchair fencing	Men's épée A	26 August
Gold	Kadeena Cox	Cycling	Women's time trial C4–5	27 August
Gold	Hannah Russell	Swimming	Women's 100 metre backstroke S12	27 August
Gold	Reece Dunn	Swimming	Men's 200 metre freestyle S14	27 August
Gold	Neil Fachie; Pilot: Matt Rotherham	Cycling	Men's time trial B	28 August
Gold	Lora Fachie; Pilot: Corrine Hall	Cycling	Women's individual pursuit B	28 August
Gold	Kadeena Cox; Jaco van Gass; Jody Cundy	Cycling	Mixed team sprint C1–5	28 August
Gold	Maisie Summers-Newton	Swimming	Women's 100 metre breaststroke SB6	28 August
Gold	Thomas Young	Athletics	Men's 100 metres T38	28 August
Gold	Reece Dunn; Bethany Firth; Jessica-Jane Applegate; Jordan Catchpole	Swimming	Mixed team 4x100m freestyle S14	28 August
Gold	Sophie Hahn	Athletics	Women's 100 metres T38	28 August
Gold	Lauren Steadman	Paratriathlon	Women's PTS5	29 August
Gold	Hannah Cockroft	Athletics	Women's 100 metres T34	29 August
Gold	Laurence Whiteley; Lauren Rowles	Rowing	Mixed double sculls	29 August
Gold	Ellen Buttrick; Giedrė Rakauskaitė; James Fox; Oliver Stanhope; Erin Kennedy	Rowing	Mixed coxed four	29 August
Gold	Chris Skelley	Judo	Men's -100 kg	29 August
Gold	Great Britain national wheelchair rugby team: Chris Ryan; Gavin Walker; Ayaz Bhuta; Jonathan Coggan; Ryan Cowling; Nicholas Cummins; Kylie Grimes; Aaron Phipps; Jim Roberts; Stuart Robinson; Jack Smith; Jamie Stead	Wheelchair rugby	Mixed tournament	29 August
Gold	Lee Pearson; Natasha Baker; Sophie Wells	Equestrian	Team	29 August
Gold	Andrew Small	Athletics	Men's 100 metres T33	30 August
Gold	Phoebe Paterson Pine	Archery	Women's individual compound open	30 August
Gold	Lee Pearson	Equestrian	Individual freestyle test grade II	30 August
Gold	Sarah Storey	Cycling	Women's road time trial C5	31 August
Gold	Ben Watson	Cycling	Men's road time trial C3	31 August
Gold	Reece Dunn	Swimming	Men's 200 metre individual medley SM14	31 August
Gold	David Smith	Boccia	Mixed individual BC1	1 September
Gold	Sarah Storey	Cycling	Women'sroad race C4–5	2 September
Gold	Ben Watson	Cycling	Men's road race C1–3	2 September
Gold	Bethany Firth	Swimming	Women's 100 metre backstroke S14	2 September
Gold	Daniel Pembroke	Athletics	Men's javelin throw F13	2 September
Gold	Owen Miller	Athletics	Men's 1500 metres T20	3 September
Gold	Emma Wiggs	Paracanoeing	Women's VL2	3 September
Gold	Jonathan Broom-Edwards	Athletics	Men's high jump T64	3 September
Gold	Hannah Cockroft	Athletics	Women's 800 metres T34	4 September
Gold	Charlotte Henshaw	Paracanoeing	Women's KL2	4 September
Gold	Laura Sugar	Paracanoeing	Women's KL3	4 September
Gold	Aled Davies	Athletics	Men's shot put F63	4 September
Silver	Crystal Lane-Wright	Cycling	Women's individual pursuit C5	25 August
Silver	Steve Bate; Pilot: Adam Duggleby	Cycling	Men's individual pursuit B	25 August
Silver	Reece Dunn	Swimming	Men's 100 metre butterfly S14	25 August
Silver	Tully Kearney	Swimming	Women's 200 metre freestyle S5	25 August
Silver	Aileen McGlynn; Pilot: Helen Scott	Cycling	Women's time trial B	26 August
Silver	Jody Cundy	Cycling	Men's time trial C4–5	26 August
Silver	Finlay Graham	Cycling	Men's individual pursuit C3	26 August
Silver	Sophie Wells	Equestrian	Individual Championship Test Grade V	26 August
Silver	Bethany Firth	Swimming	Women's 200 metre freestyle S14	27 August
Silver	Natasha Baker	Equestrian	Individual Championship Test Grade III	27 August
Silver	James Ball; Pilot: Lewis Stewart	Cycling	Men's time trial B	28 August
Silver	Grace Harvey	Swimming	Women's 100 metre breaststroke SB5	28 August
Silver	George Peasgood	Paratriathlon	Men's PTS5	29 August
Silver	Kare Adenegan	Athletics	Women's 100 metres T34	29 August
Silver	Will Bayley	Table tennis	Men's individual – Class 7	29 August
Silver	Louise Fiddes	Swimming	Women's 100 metre breaststroke SB14	29 August
Silver	Ellie Challis	Swimming	Women's 50 metre backstroke S3	29 August
Silver	Elliot Stewart	Judo	Men's -90 kg	29 August
Silver	Oliver Lam-Watson; Piers Gilliver; Dimitri Coutya	Wheelchair fencing	Men's team foil	29 August
Silver	Natasha Baker	Equestrian	Individual Freestyle Test Grade III	30 August
Silver	Crystal Lane-Wright	Cycling	Women's road time trial C5	31 August
Silver	Lora Fachie; Pilot: Corrine Hall	Cycling	Women's road time trial B	31 August
Silver	Bethany Firth	Swimming	Women's 200 metre individual medley SM14	31 August
Silver	Rebecca Redfern	Swimming	Women's 100 metre breaststroke SB13	1 September
Silver	Crystal Lane-Wright	Cycling	Women's road race C4–5	2 September
Silver	Finlay Graham	Cycling	Men's road race C1–3	2 September
Silver	Samantha Kinghorn	Athletics	Women's 400 metres T53	2 September
Silver	Will Bayley; Paul Karabardak	Table tennis	Men's team class 6–7	3 September
Silver	Sophie Unwin; Guide: Jenny Holl	Cycling	Women's road race B	3 September
Silver	Alfie Hewett; Gordon Reid	Wheelchair tennis	Men's doubles	3 September
Silver	Stephen Clegg	Swimming	Men's 100 metre butterfly S12	3 September
Silver	Richard Whitehead	Athletics	Men's 200 metres T61	3 September
Silver	Beth Munro	Taekwondo	Women's 58 kg	3 September
Silver	Libby Clegg (Chris Clarke - guide); Jonnie Peacock; Ali Smith; Nathan Maguire	Athletics	Mixed 4 × 100 metres relay	3 September
Silver	Kare Adenegan	Athletics	Women's 800 metres T34	4 September
Silver	Emma Wiggs	Paracanoeing	Women's KL2	4 September
Silver	Lucy Shuker; Jordanne Whiley	Wheelchair tennis	Women's doubles	4 September
Silver	Daniel Bethell	Badminton	Men's singles SL3	4 September
Bronze	Toni Shaw	Swimming	Women's 400 metre freestyle S9	25 August
Bronze	Georgia Wilson	Equestrian	Individual championship test grade II	26 August
Bronze	Dimitri Coutya	Wheelchair fencing	Men's épée B	26 August
Bronze	Maria Lyle	Athletics	Women's 100 metres T35	27 August
Bronze	Olivia Broome	Powerlifting	Women's 50 kg	27 August
Bronze	Jaco van Gass	Cycling	Men's time trial C1–3	27 August
Bronze	Stephen Clegg	Swimming	Men's 100 metre backstroke S12	27 August
Bronze	Jessica-Jane Applegate	Swimming	Women's 200 metre freestyle S14	27 August
Bronze	Dimitri Coutya; Piers Gilliver; Oliver Lam-Watson	Wheelchair fencing	Men's team épée	27 August
Bronze	Paul Karabardak	Table tennis	Men's individual class 6	28 August
Bronze	Sophie Unwin; Pilot: Jenny Holl	Cycling	Women's individual pursuit B	28 August
Bronze	Micky Yule	Powerlifting	Men's 72 kg	28 August
Bronze	Thomas Matthews	Table tennis	Men's individual class 1	28 August
Bronze	Jack Hunter-Spivey	Table tennis	Men's individual class 5	28 August
Bronze	Dimitri Coutya	Wheelchair fencing	Men's foil B	28 August
Bronze	Claire Cashmore	Paratriathlon	Women's PTS5	29 August
Bronze	Scott Quin	Swimming	Men's 100 metre breaststroke SB14	29 August
Bronze	Maria Lyle	Athletics	Women's 200 metres T35	29 August
Bronze	Harri Jenkins	Athletics	Men's 100 metres T33	30 August
Bronze	Louise Sugden	Powerlifting	Women's 86 kg	30 August
Bronze	Jonnie Peacock	Athletics	Men's 100 metres T64	30 August
Bronze	Georgia Wilson	Equestrian	Individual freestyle test grade II	30 August
Bronze	George Peasgood	Cycling	Men's road time trial C4	31 August
Bronze	Stephen Clegg	Swimming	Men's 100 metre freestyle S12	31 August
Bronze	Hannah Russell	Swimming	Women's 100 metre freestyle S12	31 August
Bronze	Louise Fiddes	Swimming	Women's 200 metre individual medley SM14	31 August
Bronze	Columba Blango	Athletics	Men's 400 metres T20	31 August
Bronze	Olivia Breen	Athletics	Women's long jump T38	31 August
Bronze	Victoria Rumary	Archery	Women's individual W1	1 September
Bronze	Aaron McKibbin; Billy Shilton; Ross Wilson	Table Tennis	Men's team – Class 8	1 September
Bronze	Megan Shackleton; Sue Bailey	Table Tennis	Women's team – Class 4–5	1 September
Bronze	Samantha Kinghorn	Athletics	Women's 100 metres T53	1 September
Bronze	Reece Dunn	Swimming	Men's 100 metre backstroke S14	2 September
Bronze	Jessica-Jane Applegate	Swimming	Women's 100 metre backstroke S14	2 September
Bronze	Dan Greaves	Athletics	Men's discus throw F64	2 September
Bronze	Hannah Taunton	Athletics	Women's 1500 metres T20	3 September
Bronze	Jeanette Chippington	Paracanoeing	Women's VL2	3 September
Bronze	Robert Oliver	Paracanoeing	Men's KL3	3 September
Bronze	Hollie Arnold	Athletics	Women's javelin throw F46	3 September
Bronze	Jordanne Whiley	Wheelchair tennis	Women's singles	3 September
Bronze	Stuart Wood	Paracanoeing	Men's VL3	4 September
Bronze	Gordon Reid	Wheelchair tennis	Men's singles	4 September
Bronze	Amy Truesdale	Taekwondo	Women's +58 kg	4 September
Bronze	Great Britain men's national wheelchair basketball team: Gaz Choudhry; Terry Bywater; Harry Brown; Abdi Jama; Gregg Warburton; Ian Sagar; Lee Manning; Ben Fox; Jim Palmer; James MacSorley; Billy Bridge; Lewis Edwards	Wheelchair basketball	Men's tournament	5 September
Bronze	Krysten Coombs	Badminton	Men's singles SH6	5 September

=== Medals by sport ===
Medals by sport
Sport	Gold medal	Silver medal	Bronze medal	Total
Cycling	10	11	3	24
Athletics	9	5	10	24
Swimming	8	9	9	26
Equestrian	3	3	2	8
Paracanoeing	3	1	3	7
Rowing	2	0	0	2
Wheelchair Fencing	1	1	3	5
Paratriathlon	1	1	1	3
Judo	1	1	0	2
Archery	1	0	1	2
Boccia	1	0	0	1
Wheelchair Rugby	1	0	0	1
Table Tennis	0	2	5	7
Wheelchair Tennis	0	2	2	4
Badminton	0	1	1	2
Taekwondo	0	1	1	2
Powerlifting	0	0	3	3
Wheelchair Basketball	0	0	1	1
Shooting	0	0	0	0
Total	41	38	45	124

=== Medals by date ===
Medals by date
Day	Date	Gold medal	Silver medal	Bronze medal	Total
1	25 Aug	1	4	1	6
2	26 Aug	5	4	2	11
3	27 Aug	3	2	6	11
4	28 Aug	7	2	6	15
5	29 Aug	7	7	3	17
6	30 Aug	3	1	4	8
7	31 Aug	3	3	6	12
8	1 Sept	1	1	4	6
9	2 Sept	4	3	3	10
10	3 Sept	3	7	5	15
11	4 Sept	4	4	3	11
12	5 Sept	0	0	2	2
Total		41	38	45	124

=== Medals by gender ===
Medals by gender^{(Comparison graphs)}
Gender	Gold medal	Silver medal	Bronze medal	Total	Percentage
Female	18	22	22	62	50.0%
Male	17	15	23	55	44.4%
Mixed	6	1	0	7	5.6%
Total	41	38	45	124	100%

=== Multiple medallists ===
The following Team GB competitors won several medals at the 2020 Paralympic Games.

Name	Medal	Sport	Event
Reece Dunn	Gold	Swimming	Men's 200 metre freestyle S14
Reece Dunn	Gold	Swimming	Mixed team 4x100m freestyle S14
Reece Dunn	Gold	Swimming	Men's 200m Individual Medley SM14
Reece Dunn	Silver	Swimming	Men's 100 metre butterfly S14
Reece Dunn	Bronze	Swimming	Men's 100 metre backstroke S14
Lee Pearson	Gold	Equestrian	Individual championship test grade II
Lee Pearson	Gold	Equestrian	Team test to music
Lee Pearson	Gold	Equestrian	Individual freestyle test grade II
Sarah Storey	Gold	Cycling	Women's individual pursuit C5
Sarah Storey	Gold	Cycling	Women's road time trial C5
Sarah Storey	Gold	Cycling	Women's road race C4–5
Bethany Firth	Gold	Swimming	Mixed 4×100 metre freestyle relay S14
Bethany Firth	Gold	Swimming	Women's 100 metre backstroke S14
Bethany Firth	Silver	Swimming	Women's 200 metre freestyle S14
Bethany Firth	Silver	Swimming	Women's 200 metre individual medley SM14
Jaco van Gass	Gold	Cycling	Men's individual pursuit C3
Jaco van Gass	Gold	Cycling	Mixed team sprint C1–5
Jaco van Gass	Bronze	Cycling	Men's time trial C1–3
Kadeena Cox	Gold	Cycling	Women's time trial C4–5
Kadeena Cox	Gold	Cycling	Mixed team sprint C1–5
Maisie Summers-Newton	Gold	Swimming	Women's 200 metre individual medley SM6
Maisie Summers-Newton	Gold	Swimming	Women's 100 metre breaststroke SB6
Benjamin Watson	Gold	Cycling	Men's road time trial C3
Benjamin Watson	Gold	Cycling	Men's road race C1–3
Hannah Cockroft	Gold	Athletics	Women's 100 metres T34
Hannah Cockroft	Gold	Athletics	Women's 800 metres T34
Natasha Baker	Gold	Equestrian	Team test to music
Natasha Baker	Silver	Equestrian	Individual championship test grade III
Natasha Baker	Silver	Equestrian	Individual freestyle test grade III
Piers Gilliver	Gold	Wheelchair fencing	Men's épée A
Piers Gilliver	Silver	Wheelchair fencing	Men's foil team
Piers Gilliver	Bronze	Wheelchair fencing	Men's épée team
Tully Kearney	Gold	Swimming	Women's 100 metre freestyle S5
Tully Kearney	Silver	Swimming	Women's 200 metre freestyle S5
Jody Cundy	Gold	Cycling	Mixed team sprint C1–5
Jody Cundy	Silver	Cycling	Men's time trial C4–5
Sophie Wells	Gold	Equestrian	Team test to music
Sophie Wells	Silver	Equestrian	Individual championship test grade V
Lora Fachie; Pilot: Corrine Hall	Gold	Cycling	Women's individual pursuit B
Lora Fachie; Pilot: Corrine Hall	Silver	Cycling	Women's road time trial B
Jessica-Jane Applegate	Gold	Swimming	Mixed Team 4x100m Freestyle S14
Jessica-Jane Applegate	Bronze	Swimming	Women's 200 metre freestyle S14
Jessica-Jane Applegate	Bronze	Swimming	Women's 100 metre backstroke S14
Hannah Russell	Gold	Swimming	Women's 100 metre backstroke S12
Hannah Russell	Bronze	Swimming	Women's 100 metre freestyle S12
Crystal Lane-Wright	Silver	Cycling	Women's individual pursuit C5
Crystal Lane-Wright	Silver	Cycling	Women's road time trial C5
Crystal Lane-Wright	Silver	Cycling	Women's road race C4–5
Finlay Graham	Silver	Cycling	Men's individual pursuit C3
Finlay Graham	Silver	Cycling	Men's road race C1–3
Dimitri Coutya	Silver	Wheelchair fencing	Men's foil team
Dimitri Coutya	Bronze	Wheelchair fencing	Men's épée team
Dimitri Coutya	Bronze	Wheelchair fencing	Men's foil B
Dimitri Coutya	Bronze	Wheelchair fencing	Men's épée B
Stephen Clegg	Silver	Swimming	Men's 100 metre butterfly S12
Stephen Clegg	Bronze	Swimming	Men's 100 metre backstroke S12
Stephen Clegg	Bronze	Swimming	Men's 100 metre freestyle S12
Oliver Lam-Watson	Silver	Wheelchair fencing	Men's foil team
Oliver Lam-Watson	Bronze	Wheelchair fencing	Men's épée team
Jonnie Peacock	Silver	Athletics	Mixed 4x100 metre Universal Relay
Jonnie Peacock	Bronze	Athletics	Men's 100 metre T64
George Peasgood	Silver	Paratriathlon	Men's PTS5
George Peasgood	Bronze	Cycling	Men's road time trial C4
Louise Fiddes	Silver	Swimming	Women's 100 metre breaststroke SB14
Louise Fiddes	Bronze	Swimming	Women's 200 metre Individual Medley SM14
Samantha Kinghorn	Silver	Athletics	Women's 400 metres T353
Samantha Kinghorn	Bronze	Athletics	Women's 100 Metres T53
Jordanne Whiley	Silver	Wheelchair tennis	Women's doubles
Jordanne Whiley	Bronze	Wheelchair tennis	Women's singles
Gordon Reid	Silver	Wheelchair tennis	Men's doubles
Gordon Reid	Bronze	Wheelchair tennis	Men's singles
Maria Lyle	Bronze	Athletics	Women's 100 metres T35
Maria Lyle	Bronze	Athletics	Women's 200 Metres T35
Georgia Wilson	Bronze	Equestrian	Individual championship test grade II
Georgia Wilson	Bronze	Equestrian	Individual freestyle test grade II

== Competitors ==
The following is the list of number of competitors participating in the Games:

Sport	Men	Women	Total
Archery	3	4	7
Athletics	28	23*	51*
Badminton	4	0	4
Boccia	7	6	13
Cycling	11*	9*	20*
Equestrian	1	3	4
Judo	4	0	4
Paracanoeing	4	4	8
Paratriathlon	4*	7	11*
Powerlifting	2	3	5
Rowing	4	4	8
Shooting	4	3	7
Swimming	10	15	25
Table tennis	10	2	12
Taekwondo	1	2	3
Wheelchair basketball	12	12	24
Wheelchair fencing	3	1	4
Wheelchair rugby	11	1	12
Wheelchair tennis	5	2	7
Total	127	100	227

Please note that guides in athletics and paratriathlon, competition partners in boccia and pilots in cycling are counted as athletes at the Paralympics.

* Two athletes Kadeena Cox (athletics and cycling) and George Peasgood (cycling and paratriathlon) are competing in two sports so the totals for each gender (-1) and the combined total (-2) have been reduced to reflect this.

== Administration ==
On 13 June 2018, ParalympicsGB announced that Penny Briscoe would continue in the role of Chef de Mission which she had undertaken at the previous four summer and winter Paralympic Games for the British team.

== Archery ==
Great Britain secured five quota places at the 2019 World Para Archery Championships in 's-Hertogenbosch. A further two quota places were earned in the World Archery Final Paralympic qualification event in 2021.

Men

Athlete	Event	Ranking round		Round of 32	Round of 16	Quarterfinals	Semifinals	Finals	
Athlete	Event	Score	Seed	Opposition score	Opposition score	Opposition score	Opposition score	Opposition score	Rank
John Stubbs	Men's individual compound	682	19	Bye	Marecak (SVK); L 138-138†	Did not advance			
Nathan MacQueen	Men's individual compound	680	22	Bye	Gatin (RPC); L 138-142	Did not advance			
David Phillips	Men's individual recurve	582	26	Toucoullet (FRA); W 6-2	Vivek (IND); W 7-3	Zhao (CHN); L 2-6	Did not advance		

† John Stubbs was eliminated after a single arrow shoot out.

Women

Athlete	Event	Ranking round		Round of 32	Round of 16	Quarterfinals	Semifinals	Finals	
Athlete	Event	Score	Seed	Opposition score	Opposition score	Opposition score	Opposition score	Opposition score	Rank
Victoria Rumary	Women's individual W1	590	6	—N/a	Cândida da Silva (BRA); W 115-107	Pellizzari (ITA); W 130-124	Musilova (CZE); L 107-127	Coryell (USA) W 131-123	3rd place, bronze medalist(s)
Phoebe Paterson Pine	Women's individual compound	670	16	Andrievskaia (RPC); W 142-138	Stretton (GBR); W 141-140	Chupin (FRA); W 141-139	Virgilio (ITA); W 140-137	Zúñiga (CHI); W 134-133	1st place, gold medalist(s)
Jessica Stretton	Women's individual compound	694	1	Bye	Paterson Pine (GBR); L 140-141	Did not advance			
Hazel Chaisty	Women's individual recurve	571	12	Melle (LAT); W 7-3	Sidorenko (RPC); W 6-5	Petrilli (ITA); L 2-6	Did not advance		

Team

Under Paralympic qualification rules, an NPC that has qualified an archer both men's and women's events in the same category will enter a mixed team (1 male, 1 female) into the relevant team event.

Athlete	Event	Ranking round		Round of 32	Round of 16	Quarterfinals	Semifinals	Finals	
Athlete	Event	Score	Seed	Opposition score	Opposition score	Opposition score	Opposition score	Opposition score	Rank
Nathan MacQueen; Jessica Stretton	Mixed team compound	1374	5	—N/a	Bye	Iran; L 151-153	Did not advance		
David Phillips; Hazel Chaisty	Mixed team recurve	1153	10	—N/a	Turkey; W 5-1	Iran; L 0–6	Did not advance		

== Athletics ==
On 21 July 2021, 44 British athletes have been selected to compete at the Games.

Men's track

Athlete	Event	Heats		Final	
Athlete	Event	Result	Rank	Result	Rank
Ola Abidogun	100m T47	11.17	4	Did not advance	
Columba Blango	400m T20	48.78	2 Q	47.81	3rd place, bronze medalist(s)
Shaun Burrows	400m T38	53.72	2 Q	53.25	7
Richard Chiassaro	400m T54	47.88	2 Q	47.37	7
Richard Chiassaro	800m T54	DNS		Did not advance	
Richard Chiassaro	1500m T54	3:05.44	8	Did not advance	
David Devine	5000m T13	—N/a		14:38.00	4
James Freeman	100m T33	—N/a		19.69	4
Harri Jenkins	100m T33	—N/a		18.55	3rd place, bronze medalist(s)
Nathan Maguire	400m T54	46.72	4 q	47.17	6
Nathan Maguire	800m T54	1:36.73	9	Did not advance	
Owen Miller	1500m T20	—N/a		3:54.58	1st place, gold medalist(s)
Luke Nuttall	1500m T46	—N/a		4:02.65	9
Jonnie Peacock	100m T64	10.87	2 Q	10.79	3rd place, bronze medalist(s)
Derek Rae	Marathon T46	—N/a		2:47.04	9
Ben Rowlings	100m T34	—N/a		16.77	9
Ben Rowlings	800m T34	1:48.21	4 q	1:48.63	8
Danny Sidbury	400m T54	DSQ	-	Did not advance	
Danny Sidbury	800m T54	DSQ	-	Did not advance	
Danny Sidbury	1500m T54	2:56.26	6 q	2:51.11	6
Danny Sidbury	5000m T54	10:26.65	8	Did not advance	
Zak Skinner	100m T13	11.14	4 q	11.08	8
Andrew Small	100m T33	—N/a		17.73	1st place, gold medalist(s)
Johnboy Smith	Marathon T54	—N/a		1:32.25	10
Isaac Towers	800m T34	1:46.58	2Q	1:48.08	7
David Weir	1500m T54	2:55.84	4 q	2:53.84	10
David Weir	5000m T54	10:49.05	8	Did not advance	
David Weir	Marathon T54	—N/a		1:29.45	5
Richard Whitehead	200m T61	—N/a		23.99	2nd place, silver medalist(s)
Thomas Young	100m T38	11.22	1 Q	10.94	1st place, gold medalist(s)

Men's field

Athlete	Event	Final		
Athlete	Event	Result	Points	Rank
Jonathan Broom-Edwards	High jump T64	2.10	—N/a	1st place, gold medalist(s)
Aled Davies	Shot put F63	15.33	—N/a	1st place, gold medalist(s)
Kyron Duke	Shot put F41	12.29	—N/a	4
Dan Greaves	Discus throw F64	53.56	—N/a	3rd place, bronze medalist(s)
Dan Pembroke	Javelin throw F13	69.52	—N/a	1st place, gold medalist(s)
Zak Skinner	Long jump T13	6.91	—N/a	4
Harrison Walsh	Discus throw F64	DNS	—N/a	-

Women's track

Athlete	Event	Heats		Final	
Athlete	Event	Result	Rank	Result	Rank
Kare Adenegan	100m T34	—N/a		17.03	2nd place, silver medalist(s)
Kare Adenegan	800m T34	—N/a		1:59.85	2nd place, silver medalist(s)
Fabienne André	100m T34	—N/a		19.14	5
Fabienne André	800m T34	—N/a		2:09.09	4
Olivia Breen	100m T38	13.15	4 q	13.13	6
Libby Clegg (Chris Clarke - guide)	200m T11	27.93	11	Did not advance	
Hannah Cockroft	100m T34	—N/a		16.39 WR	1st place, gold medalist(s)
Hannah Cockroft	800m T34	—N/a		1:48.99	1st place, gold medalist(s)
Kadeena Cox	400m T38	1:02.51	5 Q	1:01.16	4
Sophie Hahn	100m T38	12.38 =WR	1 Q	12.43	1st place, gold medalist(s)
Maria Lyle	100m T35	14.34	2 Q	14.18	3rd place, bronze medalist(s)
Maria Lyle	200m T35	—N/a		30.24	3rd place, bronze medalist(s)
Sophie Kamlish	100m T64	13.32	6 Q	13.49	8
Samantha Kinghorn	100m T53	—N/a		16.53	3rd place, bronze medalist(s)
Samantha Kinghorn	400m T53	56.73	4 Q	57.25	2nd place, silver medalist(s)
Samantha Kinghorn	800m T53	1:50.83	2 Q	1:47.94	4
Hannah Taunton	1500m T20	—N/a		4:35.34	3rd place, bronze medalist(s)
Ali Smith	100m T38	13.19	3 Q	13.24	8
Ali Smith	400m T38	1:02.68	8 q	1:03.05	8
Melanie Woods	400m T54	59.11	12	Did not advance	
Melanie Woods	800m T54	1:52.05	4 q	1:50.40	5

Women's field

Athlete	Event	Final		
Athlete	Event	Result	Points	Rank
Hollie Arnold	Javelin throw F46	39.73	—N/a	3rd place, bronze medalist(s)
Hetty Bartlett	Long jump T38	4.05	—N/a	6
Olivia Breen	Long jump T38	4.91	—N/a	3rd place, bronze medalist(s)
Joanna Butterfield	Club throw F51	21.77	—N/a	4
Lydia Church	Shot put F12	11.41	—N/a	8
Sabrina Fortune	Shot put F20	13.56	—N/a	5
Polly Maton	Long jump T47	5.19	—N/a	7
Anna Nicholson	Shot put F35	8.03	—N/a	6
Gemma Prescott	Club throw F32	18.28	—N/a	7
Stef Reid	Long jump T64	5.75	—N/a	4
Vanessa Wallace	Shot put F34	7.63	—N/a	5

Mixed

Athlete	Event	Heats		Final	
Athlete	Event	Result	Rank	Result	Rank
Libby Clegg (Chris Clarke - guide); Jonnie Peacock; Ali Smith; Nathan Maguire	Mixed 4 × 100 metres relay	47.86	2	47.50	2nd place, silver medalist(s)

== Badminton ==
Great Britain qualified two quotas for badminton. In July the IPC confirmed that a further two players had received bipartite invitations as high ranked players.

Men

Athlete	Event	Group stage			Quarterfinal	Semifinal	Final / BM	
Athlete	Event	Opposition Score	Opposition Score	Rank	Opposition Score	Opposition Score	Opposition Score	Rank
Martin Rooke	Singles WH2	Junthong (THA); W (18–21, 21–15, 21–12)	Mai (CHN); L (17–21, 16–21)	2 Q	Chan (HKG); L (9–21, 11–21)	Did not advance		
Daniel Bethell	Singles SL3	Fujihara (JPN); W (21–11, 21–7)	Rukaendi (INA); W (21–8, 21–12)	1 Q	—N/a	Sarkar (IND); W (21-8, 21-10)	Bhagat (IND); L (14-21, 17-21)	2nd place, silver medalist(s)
Jack Shephard	Singles SH6	Coombs (GBR); L (12–21, 10–21)	Chu (HKG); W (21–11, 22–24, 21–10)	3	—N/a	Did not advance		
Krysten Coombs	Singles SH6	Shephard (GBR); W (21–12, 21–10)	Chu (HKG); L (15–21, 10–21)	2 Q	—N/a	Nagar (IND); L (10–21, 11–21)	Tavares (BRA); W (12-21, 21-10, 21-16)	3rd place, bronze medalist(s)

== Boccia ==
Individual

Key – CP = Competition Partner

Athlete	Event	Pool matches					Quarterfinals	Semifinals	Final / BM	
Athlete	Event	Opposition Score	Opposition Score	Opposition Score	Opposition Score	Rank	Opposition Score	Opposition Score	Opposition Score	Rank
David Smith (CP - Sarah Nolan)	Mixed individual BC1	Zhang (CHN); W 7-1	Ibarbure (ARG); W 4-3	Sanchez Reyes (MEX); L 5-7	Nakamura (JPN); W 11-1	1 Q	Huadpradit (THA); W 6-1	de Oliveira (BRA); W 7-4	Wei Lun (MAS); W 4-2	1st place, gold medalist(s)
Claire Taggart	Mixed individual BC2	Cristaldo (ARG); L 2-5	Lee (KOR); L 2-3	Santos (BRA); L 1-8	—N/a	4	Did not advance			
Will Hipwell	Mixed individual BC2	Saengampa (THA); L 0-16	Mezik (SVK); L 3-6	Rombouts (BEL); L 1-8	—N/a	4	Did not advance			
Jamie McCowan (CP - Linda McCowan)	Mixed individual BC3	McCowan (GBR); L 1-7	Cotie (AUS); L 2-5	Ferrando (ARG); L 2-2†	—N/a	4	Did not advance			
Scott McCowan (CP - Gary McCowan)	Mixed individual BC3	McCowan (GBR); W 7-1	Ferrando (ARG); W 6-1	Cotie (AUS); W 4-3	—N/a	1 Q	de Oliveira (BRA); W 9-1	Polychronidis (GRE); L 4-4†	Michel (AUS); L 1-6	4
Stephen McGuire	Mixed individual BC4	Wong (HKG); L 1-4	Esaki (JPN); W 3-2	Grisales (COL); L 0-6	—N/a	3	Did not advance			
Louis Saunders	Mixed individual BC4	Andrejčik (SVK); L 3-7	Larpyen (THA); L 1-7	Somsanuk (THA); L 0-9	—N/a	4	Did not advance			

† Result was determined by a tie break ball.

Pairs and teams

Athlete	Event	Pool matches					Quarterfinals	Semifinals	Final / BM	
Athlete	Event	Opposition Score	Opposition Score	Opposition Score	Opposition Score	Rank	Opposition Score	Opposition Score	Opposition Score	Rank
Will Hipwell; David Smitth (CP - Sarah Nolan); Claire Taggart	Mixed team BC1-2	China; L 7-11	Thailand; L 2-9	Argentina; W 6-4	RPC; L 3-10	4	Did not advance			
Jamie McCowan (CP - Linda McCowan); Scott McCowan (CP - Gary McCowan); Beth Moulam (CP - Christie Hutchings)	Mixed pair B3	South Korea; L 2-2†	Greece; L 2-4	Thailand; L 3-7	France; L 0-7	4	Did not advance			
Evie Edwards; Stephen McGuire; Louis Saunders	Mixed pair B4	Brazil; W 6-4	Slovakia; L 0-8	Canada; W 5-2	Portugal; L 1-3	3	Did not advance			

== Cycling ==
Great Britain have nominated 14 cyclists, and six sighted pilots to take part in the cycling events at the 2020 Paralympic Games. Included are two dual athletes, Kadeena Cox who will also take part in the Athletics programme, and George Peasgood who will take part in triathlon. Sarah Storey will return for her eighth Paralympic Games across swimming and cycling.

Road

Athlete	Event	Time	Rank
Steve Bate piloted by Adam Duggleby	Men's road race B	DNS	-
Steve Bate piloted by Adam Duggleby	Men's time trial B	DNF	-
Fin Graham	Men's road race C3	2:05.43	2nd place, silver medalist(s)
Fin Graham	Men's time trial C3	36:20.86	4
Jaco van Gass	Men's road race C1-3	2:11.06	5
Jaco van Gass	Men's time trial C3	36:45.31	6
Ben Watson	Men's road race C3	2:04.23	1st place, gold medalist(s)
Ben Watson	Men's time trial C3	35:00.82	1st place, gold medalist(s)
George Peasgood	Men's road race C4-5	2:20.11	6
George Peasgood	Men's time trial C4	46:08.93	3rd place, bronze medalist(s)
Lora Fachie piloted by Corrine Hall	Women's road race B	2:40.26	5
Lora Fachie piloted by Corrine Hall	Women's time trial B	48:32.06	2nd place, silver medalist(s)
Sophie Unwin piloted by Jenny Holl	Women's road race B	2:36.00	2nd place, silver medalist(s)
Sophie Unwin piloted by Jenny Holl	Women's time trial B	49:59.15	5
Sarah Storey	Women's road race C4-5	2:21.51	1st place, gold medalist(s)
Sarah Storey	Women's time trial C5	36:08.90	1st place, gold medalist(s)
Crystal Lane-Wright	Women's road race C4-5	2:21.58	2nd place, silver medalist(s)
Crystal Lane-Wright	Women's time trial C5	37:40.89	2nd place, silver medalist(s)

Track

Athlete	Event	Qualification		Final	
Athlete	Event	Time	Rank	Opposition Time	Rank
James Ball piloted by Lewis Stewart	Men's 1000 m time trial B	—N/a		59.503	2nd place, silver medalist(s)
James Ball piloted by Lewis Stewart	Men's individual pursuit B	DNF	-	Did not advance	
Steve Bate piloted by Adam Duggleby	Men's individual pursuit B	4:02.497	2 Q	OVL	2nd place, silver medalist(s)
Neil Fachie piloted by Matt Rotherham	Men's 1000 m time trial B	—N/a		58.038 WR	1st place, gold medalist(s)
Neil Fachie piloted by Matt Rotherham	Men's individual pursuit B	4:42.630	11	Did not advance	
Fin Graham	Men's individual pursuit C3	3:19.780 WR	2 Q	3:22.000	2nd place, silver medalist(s)
Jaco van Gass	Men's 1000 m time trial C1–3	—N/a		1:05.569 WR †	3rd place, bronze medalist(s)
Jaco van Gass	Men's individual pursuit C3	3:17.593 WR	1 Q	3:20.987	1st place, gold medalist(s)
Jody Cundy	Men's 1000 m time trial C4–5	—N/a		1:01.847	2nd place, silver medalist(s)
Lora Fachie piloted by Corrine Hall	Women's 1000 m time trial B	—N/a		1:08.232	4
Lora Fachie piloted by Corrine Hall	Women's individual pursuit B	3:19.483 WR	1 Q	3:19.560	1st place, gold medalist(s)
Aileen McGlynn piloted by Helen Scott	Women's 1000 m time trial B	—N/a		1:06.743	2nd place, silver medalist(s)
Aileen McGlynn piloted by Helen Scott	Women's individual pursuit B	3:35.858	8	Did not advance	
Sophie Unwin piloted by Jenny Holl	Women's 1000 m time trial B	—N/a		1:08.701	5
Sophie Unwin piloted by Jenny Holl	Women's individual pursuit B	3:22.670	3 Q	3:23.446	3rd place, bronze medalist(s)
Kadeena Cox	Women's 500 m time trial C4-5	—N/a		34.433 WR††	1st place, gold medalist(s)
Sarah Storey	Women's individual pursuit C5	3:27.057 WR	1 Q	-	1st place, gold medalist(s)
Crystal Lane-Wright	Women's individual pursuit C5	3:35.061	2 Q	OVL	2nd place, silver medalist(s)
Kadeena Cox; Jaco van Gass; Jody Cundy	Mixed team sprint	48.524	2 Q	47.579 WR	1st place, gold medalist(s)

† The Men's 1000 metres C1-3 time trial is a factored event. Although finishing 3rd after factoring, Jaco van Gass's time is recognised as a world record in his C3 classification.

†† The Women's 500 metres C4–5 time trial is a factored event. Kadeena Cox's time is a world record in her C4 classification.

== Equestrian ==
Great Britain have qualified 4 riders for the team event after winning a bronze medal in the 2018 FEI World Equestrian Games. A fifth individual rider is also qualified.

Individual

Athlete	Horse	Event	Total	
Athlete	Horse	Event	Score	Rank
Natasha Baker	Keystone Dawn Chorus	Individual championship test grade III	76.265	(silver) Q
Natasha Baker	Keystone Dawn Chorus	Individual freestyle test grade III	77.614	2nd place, silver medalist(s)
Georgia Wilson	Sakura	Individual championship test grade II	72.765	(bronze) Q
Georgia Wilson	Sakura	Individual freestyle test grade II	76.754	3rd place, bronze medalist(s)
Lee Pearson	Breezer	Individual championship test grade II	76.265	(gold) Q
Lee Pearson	Breezer	Individual freestyle test grade II	82.447	1st place, gold medalist(s)
Sophie Wells	Don Cara M	Individual championship test grade V	74.405	(silver) Q
Sophie Wells	Don Cara M	Individual freestyle test grade V	73.560	4

Team

Athlete	Horse	Event	Individual score	Total	
Athlete	Horse	Event	TT	Score	Rank
Lee Pearson	See above	Team	77.636	229.905	1st place, gold medalist(s)
Natasha Baker	See above	Team	76.618	229.905	1st place, gold medalist(s)
Sophie Wells	See above	Team	75.651	229.905	1st place, gold medalist(s)

== Judo ==
Athlete	Event	Preliminaries	Quarterfinals	Semifinals	Repechage First round	Repechage Final	Final / BM	
Athlete	Event	Opposition Result	Opposition Result	Opposition Result	Opposition Result	Opposition Result	Opposition Result	Rank
Daniel Powell	Men's −81 kg	Pereira (BRA); W 10-01	Rahimli (AZE); L 00-11	—N/a		Petit (FRA); L 00-10	Did not advance	
Elliot Stewart	Men's −90 kg	Bye	Boboev (UZB); W 10-00	Nazarenko (UKR); W 01-00	—N/a		Nouri (IRI); L 00-10	2nd place, silver medalist(s)
Chris Skelley	Men's −100 kg	Bye	Sharif Khalilov (UZB); W 10-0	Upmann (GER); W 11-0	—N/a		Goodrich (USA); W 01-00	1st place, gold medalist(s)
Jack Hodgson	Men's +100 kg	Zakiyev (AZE); L 00-01	Did not advance					

== Paracanoeing ==
Great Britain earned quota places for the following races at the 2019 ICF Canoe Sprint World Championships. Further qualification will be available at the 2021 ICF Paracanoe World Championships. On 8 June 2021, Paralympics GB announced the selection of the eight paracanoeists who will represent Great Britain in Tokyo.

Athlete	Event	Heats		Semifinal		Final	
Athlete	Event	Time	Rank	Time	Rank	Time	Rank
Ian Marsden	Men's KL1	55.601	4 SF	52.806	3 FA	52.848	8
David Phillipson	Men's KL2	44.295	2 SF	43.075	3 FA	43.346	7
Robert Oliver	Men's KL3	41.820	3 SF	41.102	2 FA	41.268	3rd place, bronze medalist(s)
Stuart Wood	Men's VL3	52.579	2 SF	50.004	1 FA	52.760	3rd place, bronze medalist(s)
Jeanette Chippington	Women's KL1	1:02.826	5 SF	1:01.762	4	Did not advance	
Jeanette Chippington	Women's VL2	1:03.854	2 SF	1:01.167	1 FA	1:02.149	3rd place, bronze medalist(s)
Charlotte Henshaw	Women's KL2	52.794	1 FA	bye		50.760	1st place, gold medalist(s)
Emma Wiggs	Women's KL2	53.371	1 FA	bye		51.409	2nd place, silver medalist(s)
Emma Wiggs	Women's VL2	58.084	1 FA	bye		57.028	1st place, gold medalist(s)
Laura Sugar	Women's KL3	50.347	1 FA	bye		49.582	1st place, gold medalist(s)

== Paratriathlon ==
The following athletes earned quota places for Great Britain in paratriathlon at the 2020 Summer Paralympics.

Athlete	Event	Swim	Trans 1	Bike	Trans 2	Run	Total time	Rank
Michael Taylor	Men's PTS4	10.11	1.30	33.09	0.59	22.22	1:08.11	8
George Peasgood	Men's PTS5	9.27	0.53	29.14	0.38	18.43	58.55	2nd place, silver medalist(s)
Dave Ellis (Guide – Luke Pollard)	Men's PTVI	9.50	1.00	-	-	-	-	DNF
Fran Brown	Women's PTS2	13.11	1.51	34.35	1.19	28.46	1:19.42	4
Claire Cashmore	Women's PTS5	11.53	1.04	34.08	0.49	19.42	1:07.36	3rd place, bronze medalist(s)
Lauren Steadman	Women's PTS5	11.55	1.01	31.45	1.00	19.05	1:04.46	1st place, gold medalist(s)
Alison Peasgood (Guide – Nikki Bartlett)	Women's PTVI	12.28	1.22	31.41	1.01	21.27	1:11.47	4
Melissa Reid (Guide – Hazel McLoud)	Women's PTVI	12.12	1.29	32.34	0.51	23.30	1:14.24	7

== Powerlifting ==
Athlete	Event	Total lifted	Rank
Zoe Newson	Women's −41 kg	94	4
Olivia Broome	Women's −50 kg	107	3rd place, bronze medalist(s)
Louise Sugden	Women's −86 kg	131	3rd place, bronze medalist(s)
Ali Jawad	Men's −59 kg	164	6
Micky Yule	Men's −72 kg	182	3rd place, bronze medalist(s)

== Rowing ==
Great Britain qualified three boats for each of the following rowing classes into the Paralympic regatta. All of them qualified after successfully entering the top seven for men's single sculls and top eight for mixed events at the 2019 World Rowing Championships in Ottensheim, Austria.

On 25 June 2021, Great Britain selected eight rowers to compete.

Athlete	Event	Heats		Repechage		Final	
Athlete	Event	Time	Rank	Time	Rank	Time	Rank
Ben Pritchard	Men's single sculls	10:12.24	2 R	9:14.61	1 FA	10:06.95	5
Laurence Whiteley; Lauren Rowles	Mixed double sculls	8:42.27	1 FA	Bye		8:38.99	1st place, gold medalist(s)
Ellen Buttrick; Giedre Rakauskaite; James Fox; Oliver Stanhope; Erin Kennedy (cox)	Mixed coxed four	7:09.44	1 FA	Bye		7:09.08	1st place, gold medalist(s)

Qualification Legend: FA=Final A (medal); FB=Final B (non-medal); R=Repechage

== Shooting ==
Great Britain have qualified slots for shooting during the 2018 World Shooting Para Sport Championships and the 2018 World Shooting Para Sport World Cup. On 13 January 2021, Paralympics GB announced the selection of six shooters to compete in Tokyo. James Bevis, Ryan Cockbill, Tim Jeffery, Matt Skelhon, Issy Bailey and Lorraine Lambert were the first athletes to be chosen for the British team competing in Tokyo.

Athlete	Event	Qualification		Final	
Athlete	Event	Score	Rank	Score	Rank
Issy Bailey	Women's P2 – 10 m air pistol SH1	468–7x	18	Did not advance	
Issy Bailey	Mixed P3 – 25 m pistol SH1	275-1x	23	Did not advance	
Lesley Stewart	Women's R2 – 10 m air rifle standing SH1	610.8	18	Did not advance	
Lesley Stewart	Women's R8 – 50 m rifle three position SH1	1133-34x	13	Did not advance	
Matt Skelhon	Mixed R3 – 10 m air rifle prone SH1	631.2	16	Did not advance	
Matt Skelhon	Mixed R6 – 50 m rifle prone SH1	615.8	13	Did not advance	
Ryan Cockbill	Mixed R4 – 10 m air rifle standing SH2	629.1	10	Did not advance	
Ryan Cockbill	Mixed R5 – 10 m air rifle prone SH2	632.2	18	Did not advance	
Ryan Cockbill	Mixed R9 – 50 m rifle prone SH2	624.4	4 Q	122.6	8
Tim Jeffery	Mixed R4 – 10 m air rifle standing SH2	631.5	7 Q	124.1	8
Tim Jeffery	Mixed R5 – 10 m air rifle prone SH2	636.7	5 Q	146.5	7
Tim Jeffery	Mixed R9 – 50 m rifle prone SH2	623.4	5 Q	163.3	6
James Bevis	Mixed R5 – 10 m air rifle prone SH2	632.1	19	Did not advance	
James Bevis	Mixed R9 – 50 m rifle prone SH2	616.7	21	Did not advance	
Lorraine Lambert	Mixed R9 – 50 m rifle prone SH1	609.2	36	Did not advance	
Lorraine Lambert	Women's R8 – 50 m rifle three position SH1	1121-33x	15	Did not advance	

== Swimming ==
On 30 June 2021, 23 British swimmers are qualified to compete at the 2020 Summer Paralympics. Alice Tai withdrew from competition following an elbow injury.

Men

Athlete	Event	Heats		Final	
Athlete	Event	Result	Rank	Result	Rank
Jordan Catchpole	Men's 200m freestyle S14	1:56.81	1 Q	1:56.33	5
Jordan Catchpole	Men's 100m backstroke S14	1:01.50	7 Q	1:00:96	4
Jordan Catchpole	Men's 100m butterfly S14	59.16	16	Did not advance	
Jordan Catchpole	Men's 200m individual medley SM14	2:16.35	9	Did not advance	
Stephen Clegg	Men's 100m freestyle S12	53.84	1 Q	53.43	3rd place, bronze medalist(s)
Stephen Clegg	Men's 100m backstroke S12	—N/a		1:01.27	3rd place, bronze medalist(s)
Stephen Clegg	Men's 100m butterfly S12	59.13	2 Q	57.87	2nd place, silver medalist(s)
Reece Dunn	Men's 200m freestyle S14	1:57.30	2 Q	1:52.40 WR	1st place, gold medalist(s)
Reece Dunn	Men's 100m backstroke S14	1:00.37	2 Q	59:97	3rd place, bronze medalist(s)
Reece Dunn	Men's 100m butterfly S14	55.99 PR	1 Q	55.12	2nd place, silver medalist(s)
Reece Dunn	Men's 200m individual medley SM14	2:12.61	2 Q	2:08.02 WR	1st place, gold medalist(s)
Thomas Hamer	Men's 200m freestyle S14	DNS		Did not advance	
Louis Lawlor	Men's 100m backstroke S14	1:01.43	5 Q	1:01.80	8
Lyndon Longhorne	Men's 50m freestyle S4	45.78	16	Did not advance	
Lyndon Longhorne	Men's 100m freestyle S4	1:34.27	8 Q	1:33.30	7
Lyndon Longhorne	Men's 200m freestyle S4	3:25.07	9	Did not advance	
Lyndon Longhorne	Men's 50m backstroke S4	50.12	11	Did not advance	
Lyndon Longhorne	Men's 50m breaststroke SB3	58.79	12	Did not advance	
Lyndon Longhorne	Men's 150m individual medley SM4	2:52.76	12	Did not advance	
Conner Morrison	Men's 100m breaststroke SB14	1:08.01	6 Q	1:08.01	8
Andrew Mullen	Men's 50m freestyle S5	36.01	13	Did not advance	
Andrew Mullen	Men's 50m backstroke S5	37.99	7 Q	37.96	7
Andrew Mullen	Men's 50m butterfly S5	39.01	11	Did not advance	
William Perry	Men's 100m freestyle S9	1:14.75	18	Did not advance	
William Perry	Men's 100m breaststroke SB6	1:30.44	14	Did not advance	
William Perry	Men's 200m individual medley SM6	3:01.50	13	Did not advance	
Scott Quin	Men's 100m breaststroke SB14	1:06.20	3 Q	1:05.91	3rd place, bronze medalist(s)

Women

Athlete	Event	Heats		Final	
Athlete	Event	Result	Rank	Result	Rank
Jessica-Jane Applegate	Women's 200m freestyle S14	2:10.83	3 Q	2:09.53	3rd place, bronze medalist(s)
Jessica-Jane Applegate	Women's 100m backstroke S14	1:08.41	2 Q	1:07.93	3rd place, bronze medalist(s)
Jessica-Jane Applegate	Women's 100m butterfly S14	1:07.57	4 Q	1:07.69	6
Jessica-Jane Applegate	Women's 200m individual medley SM14	2:31.48	3 Q	2:30.43	4
Ellie Challis	Women's 50m freestyle S4	54.94	13	Did not advance	
Ellie Challis	Women's 100 metre freestyle S3	1:53.63	4 Q	1:54.84	4
Ellie Challis	Women's 50 metre backstroke S3	55.68	2 Q	55.11	2nd place, silver medalist(s)
Ellie Challis	Women's 50 metre breaststroke SB3	1:10.37	10	Did not advance	
Louise Fiddes	Women's 200m freestyle S14	2:11.62	4 Q	2:11.20	4
Louise Fiddes	Women's 100m breaststroke SB14	1:18.64	6 Q	1:15.93	2nd place, silver medalist(s)
Louise Fiddes	Women's 100m butterfly S14	1:07.68	5 Q	1:07.24	5
Louise Fiddes	Women's 200m individual medley SM14	2:33.17	5 Q	2:29.21	3rd place, bronze medalist(s)
Bethany Firth	Women's 200m freestyle S14	2:10.58	2 Q	2:03.99	2nd place, silver medalist(s)
Bethany Firth	Women's 100m backstroke S14	1:07.16	1 Q	1:05.92	1st place, gold medalist(s)
Bethany Firth	Women's 200m individual medley SM14	2:27.16	2 Q	2:23.19	2nd place, silver medalist(s)
Grace Harvey	Women's 400m freestyle S6	5:33.78	6 Q	5:36.26	7
Grace Harvey	Women's 100m backstroke S6	1:31.10	12	Did not advance	
Grace Harvey	Women's 100m breaststroke SB5	1:42.09	1 Q	1:42.22	2nd place, silver medalist(s)
Grace Harvey	Women's 50m butterfly S6	41.18	11	Did not advance	
Grace Harvey	Women's 200m individual medley SM6	3:05.84	5 Q	3:05.58	6
Suzanna Hext	Women's 100m freestyle S5	1:21.69	2 Q	1:22.49	4
Suzanna Hext	Women's 200m freestyle S5	2:59.05	3 Q	2:59.55	4
Suzanna Hext	Women's 50m backstroke S5	DNS		Did not start	
Suzanna Hext	Women's 100m breaststroke SB4	DNS		Did not start	
Tully Kearney	Women's 100m freestyle S5	1:19.60	1 Q	1:14.39 WR	1st place, gold medalist(s)
Tully Kearney	Women's 200m freestyle S5	2:52.30	1 Q	2:46.65	2nd place, silver medalist(s)
Stephanie Millward	Women's 100m freestyle S9	1:08.19	16	Did not advance	
Stephanie Millward	Women's 100m backstroke S9	1:15.13	8 Q	1:15.49	8
Zara Mullooly	Women's 50m freestyle S10	28.82	7	28.73	7
Zara Mullooly	Women's 100m freestyle S10	1:02.18	7 Q	1:01.771	7
Zara Mullooly	Women's 400m freestyle S10	—N/a		4:44.50	4
Rebecca Redfern	Women's 50m freestyle S13	29.62	21	Did not advance	
Rebecca Redfern	Women's 100m breaststroke SB13	1:15.46	2 Q	1:14.10	2nd place, silver medalist(s)
Ellie Robinson	Women's 50m butterfly S6	37.24	4 Q	37.08	5
Hannah Russell	Women's 50m freestyle S13	27.96	7 Q	27.58	6
Hannah Russell	Women's 100m freestyle S12	1:01.81	4 Q	1:00.25	3rd place, bronze medalist(s)
Hannah Russell	Women's 100m backstroke S12	—N/a		1:08.44	1st place, gold medalist(s)
Toni Shaw	Women's 100m freestyle S9	1:03.59	2 Q	1:03.42	4
Toni Shaw	Women's 400m freestyle S9	4:46.19	2 Q	4:39.32	3rd place, bronze medalist(s)
Toni Shaw	Women's 100m butterfly S9	1:10.41	4 Q	1:08.87	4
Ellie Simmonds	Women's 400m freestyle S6	5:27.64	4 Q	5:27.99	5
Ellie Simmonds	Women's 100m breaststroke SB6	1:39.95	4 Q	1:39.94	4
Ellie Simmonds	Women's 200m individual medley SM6	3:07.63	6 Q	3:04.37	5
Maisie Summers-Newton	Women's 400m freestyle S6	5:27.91	5 Q	5:24.42	4
Maisie Summers-Newton	Women's 100m breaststroke SB6	1:33.12	1 Q	1:32.34	1st place, gold medalist(s)
Maisie Summers-Newton	Women's 200m individual medley SM6	3:00.15	3 Q	2:56.68 WR	1st place, gold medalist(s)
Stephanie Millward; Grace Harvey; Zara Mullooly; Toni Shaw	Women's 4x100m freestyle relay - 34 points	—N/a		DSQ	-
Stephanie Millward; Maisie Summers-Newton; Toni Shaw; Zara Mullooly	Women's 4x100m medley relay - 34 points	—N/a		4:58.76	4

Mixed

Athlete	Event	Heats		Final	
Athlete	Event	Result	Rank	Result	Rank
Ellie Challis; Andrew Mullen; Ellie Robinson; William Perry; Tully Kearney; Lyndon Longhorne	Mixed 4x50m freestyle relay 20 points	2:42.42	3 Q	2:48.34	8
Reece Dunn; Bethany Firth; Jessica-Jane Applegate; Jordan Catchpole	Mixed 4x100m freestyle relay S14	—N/a		3:40.63 WR	1st place, gold medalist(s)

== Table tennis ==
Great Britain entered nine athletes into the table tennis competition at the games. Rob Davies qualified from the 2019 ITTF European Para Championships which was held in Helsingborg, Sweden and the other eight athletes qualified via World Ranking allocation.

Men

Athlete	Event	Preliminaries				Round of 16	Quarterfinals	Semifinals	Final / BM	
Athlete	Event	Opposition Result	Opposition Result	Opposition Result	Rank	Opposition Result	Opposition Result	Opposition Result	Opposition Result	Rank
Tom Matthews	Individual C1	Nam (KOR); W 3-1	—N/a	Lavrov (RPC); W 3-1	1 Q	—N/a	Borgato (ITA); W 3-1	Kim (KOR); L 0-3	Did not advance	3rd place, bronze medalist(s)
Jack Hunter-Spivey	Individual C5	Cheng (TPE); W 3-0	—N/a	Brands (BEL); W 3-1	1 Q	—N/a	Urhaug (NOR); W 3-2	Baus (GER); L 0-3	Did not advance	3rd place, bronze medalist(s)
Paul Karabardak	Individual C6	Simion (ROU); W 3-1	—N/a	Hirth (AUS); W 3-0	1 Q	Bye	Park (KOR); W 3-2	Seidenfeld (USA); L 0-3	Did not advance	3rd place, bronze medalist(s)
Will Bayley	Individual C7	Chudziki (POL); W 3-1	—N/a	Punpoo (THA); W 3-0	1 Q	Bye	Schnake (GER); W 3-0	Liao (CHN); W 3-2	Yan (CHN); L 1-3	2nd place, silver medalist(s)
Aaron McKibbin	Individual C8	Pellissier (AUS); W 3-0	—N/a	Grudzien (POL); L 0-3	2 Q	Karlsson (SWE); W 3-2	Didukh (UKR); L 1-3	Did not advance		
Billy Shilton	Individual C8	Didukh (UKR); L 0-3	—N/a	Farinlove (NGR); W 3-0	2 Q	Grudzien (POL); W 3-2	Zhao (CHN); L 0-3	Did not advance		
Ross Wilson	Individual C8	Berthier (FRA); W 3-0	—N/a	Peng (CHN); L 2-3	2 Q	Andersson (SWE); W 3-0	Nokolenko (UKR); L 1-3	Did not advance		
Ashley Facey-Thompson	Individual C9	Iwabuchi (JPN); L 2-3	Nozdrunov (RPC); W 3-2	Kats (UKR); L 1-3	4	Did not advance				
Joshua Stacey	Individual C9	Ma (AUS); L 0-3	Chee (MAS); W 3-0	Kalem (ITA); W 3-2	2 Q	—N/a	Nozdrunov (RPC); L 2-3	Did not advance		

Women

Athlete	Event	Preliminaries				Quarterfinals	Semifinals	Final / BM	
Athlete	Event	Opposition Result	Opposition Result	Opposition Result	Rank	Opposition Result	Opposition Result	Opposition Result	Rank
Sue Bailey	Individual C4	Peric Rankovic (SRB); L 0-3	—N/a	Lu (TPE); L 1-3	3	Did not advance			
Megan Shackleton	Individual C4	Zhou (CHN); L 0-3	—N/a	Patel (IND); L 1-3	3	Did not advance			

Teams

Athletes	Event	Round of 16	Quarterfinals	Semifinals	Final / BM	
Athletes	Event	Opposition Result	Opposition Result	Opposition Result	Opposition Result	Rank
Sue Bailey; Megan Shackleton	Women's team C4-5	—N/a	Jordan; W 2-1	China; L 0-2	Did not advance	3rd place, bronze medalist(s)
Will Bayley; Paul Karabardak	Men's team C6-7	Bye	Australia; W 2-0	Spain; W 2-1	China; L 0-2	2nd place, silver medalist(s)
Aaron McKibbin; Billy Shilton; Ross Wilson	Men's team C8	—N/a	Hungary; W 2-0	China; L 0-2	Did not advance	3rd place, bronze medalist(s)
Ashley Facey-Thompson; Joshua Stacey	Men's team C9-10	Spain; W 2-0	China; L 0-2	Did not advance		

== Taekwondo ==
Great Britain qualified three athletes to compete at the Paralympics competition. Amy Truesdale being the first British para taekwondo athlete who qualified for the first time at this games after placing first in the world ranking. Meanwhile, two other athletes qualified by winning the gold medal at the 2021 European Qualification Tournament in Sofia, Bulgaria.

Athlete	Event	First round	Quarterfinals	Semifinals	Repechage	Final / BM	
Athlete	Event	Opposition Result	Opposition Result	Opposition Result	Opposition Result	Opposition Result	Rank
Joe Lane	Men's +75 kg	Ataev (RPC); L 5-36	Did not advance		Mohamed (LBA); L 18-23	Did not advance	
Beth Munro	Women's –58 kg	Goverdhan (NEP); W 21-8	Gürdal (TUR); W 34-22	Yujie (CHN); W 34-25	Bye	Gjessing (DEN); L 14-32	2nd place, silver medalist(s)
Amy Truesdale	Women's +58 kg	Bye	Akermach (MAR); W 42-27	Naimova (UZB); L 14-60	Bye	Shahab (IRI); W 41-31	3rd place, bronze medalist(s)

== Wheelchair basketball ==
The British women's basketball team have qualified for Tokyo 2020 Paralympics after the women's team won the silver medal in the 2019 European Wheelchair Basketball Championships.

Men's squad

The following is the Great Britain roster in the men's wheelchair basketball tournament of the 2020 Summer Paralympics.

Great Britain men's national wheelchair basketball team - 2020 Summer Paralympics roster
Players
Coaches

No.	Name	Age – Date of birth	Pts.
4	Gaz Choudhry	36 – 23 June 1985	4.0
7	Terry Bywater	38 – 28 February 1983	4.5
9	Harry Brown	27 – 21 June 1994	2.5
10	Abdi Jama	38 – 1 November 1982	1.0
12	Gregg Warburton	24 – 19 November 1996	2.0
13	Ian Sagar	39 – 29 March 1982	3.0
14	Lee Manning	31 – 11 January 1990	4.5
15	Ben Fox	26 – 16 August 1995	3.5
16	James Palmer	24 – 23 April 1997	1.0
17	James Macsorley	26 – 13 February 1995	2.0
18	Billy Bridge	26 – 8 August 1995	3.0
20	Lewis Edwards	23 – 6 July 1998	3.0

Head coach

Gaz Choudhry

Assistant coach(es)

Lee Manning

Legend

- Age - describes age on 24 August 2021

Group stage				Knockout stage			
Pool Match 1 Opposition Result	Pool Match 2 Opposition Result	Pool Match 5 Opposition Result	Rank	Quarterfinal Opposition Result	Semifinal Opposition Result	Final / BM Opposition Result	Rank
Algeria; W 70-43	Germany; L 59-71	Australia; W 70-69	1 Q	Canada; W 66-52	Japan; L 68-79	Spain; W 68-58	3rd place, bronze medalist(s)
Pool Match 3 Opposition Result	Pool Match 4 Opposition Result	Australia; W 70-69	1 Q	Canada; W 66-52	Japan; L 68-79	Spain; W 68-58	3rd place, bronze medalist(s)
United States; W 64-63	Iran; W 69-57	Australia; W 70-69	1 Q	Canada; W 66-52	Japan; L 68-79	Spain; W 68-58	3rd place, bronze medalist(s)

=== Women's tournament ===
The following is the Great Britain roster in the women's wheelchair basketball tournament of the 2020 Summer Paralympics.

Great Britain women's national wheelchair basketball team - 2020 Summer Paralympics roster
Players
Coaches

No.	Name	Age – Date of birth	Pts.
4	Charlotte Moore	22 – 13 September 1998	1.0
5	Sophie Carrigill	27 – 19 January 1994	1.0
6	Michaela Bell	25 – 8 August 1996	1.5
7	Helen Freeman	31 – 23 November 1989	4.0
8	Laurie Williams	29 – 4 February 1992	2.5
9	Judith Hamer	30 – 3 December 1990	4.0
10	Amy Conroy	28 – 22 October 1992	4.0
11	Madeleine Thompson	26 – 29 March 1995	4.0
12	Lucy Robinson	22 – 21 May 1999	4.5
13	Siobhan Fitzpatrick	23 – 28 January 1998	3.0
14	Joy Haizelden	22 – 1 December 1998	2.5
15	Robyn Love	30 – 28 August 1990	3.5

Head coach

Simon Fisher

Assistant coach(es)

Madeleine Thompson

Legend

- Age - describes age on 24 August 2021

Group stage			Knockout stage			
Pool Match 1 Opposition Result	Pool Match 2 Opposition Result	Rank	Quarterfinal Opposition Result	Semifinal Opposition Result	Final / BM Opposition Result	Rank
Canada; L 54-73	Japan; L 48-54	4 Q	China; L 33-47	Did not advance		7 (7th-8th classification play-off Spain; W 62-43)
Pool Match 3 Opposition Result	Pool Match 4 Opposition Result	4 Q	China; L 33-47	Did not advance		7 (7th-8th classification play-off Spain; W 62-43)
Germany; L 35-53	Australia; W 75-38	4 Q	China; L 33-47	Did not advance		7 (7th-8th classification play-off Spain; W 62-43)

== Wheelchair fencing ==
On 28 June 2021, Paralympics GB announced the selection of the four fencers who would represent Great Britain in Tokyo.

Individual

Athlete	Event	Qualification			Round of 16	Quarterfinal	Semifinal	Final / BM	
Athlete	Event	Opposition	Score	Rank	Opposition Score	Opposition Score	Opposition Score	Opposition Score	Rank
Gemma Collis-McCann	Women's individual épée A	Veres (HUN)	L 3-5	4 Q	Breus (UKR); L 5-15	Did not advance			10
Gemma Collis-McCann	Women's individual épée A	Matsumoto (JPN)	W 5-2	4 Q	Breus (UKR); L 5-15	Did not advance			10
Gemma Collis-McCann	Women's individual épée A	Rong (CHN)	L 2-5	4 Q	Breus (UKR); L 5-15	Did not advance			10
Gemma Collis-McCann	Women's individual épée A	Evdokimova (RPC)	L 4-5	4 Q	Breus (UKR); L 5-15	Did not advance			10
Gemma Collis-McCann	Women's individual épée A	Drozdz (POL)	W 5-4	4 Q	Breus (UKR); L 5-15	Did not advance			10
Gemma Collis-McCann	Women's individual sabre A	Kajmasi (HUN)	L 1-5	5	Did not advance				13
Gemma Collis-McCann	Women's individual sabre A	Fidrych (POL)	L 1-5	5	Did not advance				13
Gemma Collis-McCann	Women's individual sabre A	Morkvych (UKR)	L 1-5	5	Did not advance				13
Gemma Collis-McCann	Women's individual sabre A	Mogos (ITA)	L 4-5	5	Did not advance				13
Dimitri Coutya	Men's individual épée B	Fujita (JPN)	W 5-4	1 Q	—N/a	Datsko (UKR); W 15-13	Guissone (BRA); L 12-15	Pranevich (BLR); W 15-11	3rd place, bronze medalist(s)
Dimitri Coutya	Men's individual épée B	Peter (FRA)	W 5-1	1 Q	—N/a	Datsko (UKR); W 15-13	Guissone (BRA); L 12-15	Pranevich (BLR); W 15-11	3rd place, bronze medalist(s)
Dimitri Coutya	Men's individual épée B	Datsko (UKR)	W 5-2	1 Q	—N/a	Datsko (UKR); W 15-13	Guissone (BRA); L 12-15	Pranevich (BLR); W 15-11	3rd place, bronze medalist(s)
Dimitri Coutya	Men's individual épée B	Kuzyukov (RPC)	W 5-3	1 Q	—N/a	Datsko (UKR); W 15-13	Guissone (BRA); L 12-15	Pranevich (BLR); W 15-11	3rd place, bronze medalist(s)
Dimitri Coutya	Men's individual épée B	Mainville (CAN)	W 5-1	1 Q	—N/a	Datsko (UKR); W 15-13	Guissone (BRA); L 12-15	Pranevich (BLR); W 15-11	3rd place, bronze medalist(s)
Dimitri Coutya	Men's individual épée B	Ali (IRQ)	W 5-2	1 Q	—N/a	Datsko (UKR); W 15-13	Guissone (BRA); L 12-15	Pranevich (BLR); W 15-11	3rd place, bronze medalist(s)
Dimitri Coutya	Men's individual foil B	Onda (JPN)	W 5-1	2 Q	—N/a	Valet (FRA); W 15-8	Feng (CHN); L 14-15	Kamalov (RPC); W 15-2	3rd place, bronze medalist(s)
Dimitri Coutya	Men's individual foil B	Chaves (BRA)	W 5-1	2 Q	—N/a	Valet (FRA); W 15-8	Feng (CHN); L 14-15	Kamalov (RPC); W 15-2	3rd place, bronze medalist(s)
Dimitri Coutya	Men's individual foil B	Kuzyukov (RPC)	W 5-1	2 Q	—N/a	Valet (FRA); W 15-8	Feng (CHN); L 14-15	Kamalov (RPC); W 15-2	3rd place, bronze medalist(s)
Dimitri Coutya	Men's individual foil B	Valet (FRA)	W 5-3	2 Q	—N/a	Valet (FRA); W 15-8	Feng (CHN); L 14-15	Kamalov (RPC); W 15-2	3rd place, bronze medalist(s)
Dimitri Coutya	Men's individual foil B	Naumenko (UKR)	W 5-0	2 Q	—N/a	Valet (FRA); W 15-8	Feng (CHN); L 14-15	Kamalov (RPC); W 15-2	3rd place, bronze medalist(s)
Dimitri Coutya	Men's individual foil B	Feng (CHN)	L 3-5	2 Q	—N/a	Valet (FRA); W 15-8	Feng (CHN); L 14-15	Kamalov (RPC); W 15-2	3rd place, bronze medalist(s)
Piers Gilliver	Men's individual épée A	Manko (UKR)	W 5-2	1 Q	—N/a	Manko (UKR); W 15-2	Sun (CHN); W 15-6	Shaburov (BLR); W 15-9	1st place, gold medalist(s)
Piers Gilliver	Men's individual épée A	Noble (FRA)	W 5-4	1 Q	—N/a	Manko (UKR); W 15-2	Sun (CHN); W 15-6	Shaburov (BLR); W 15-9	1st place, gold medalist(s)
Piers Gilliver	Men's individual épée A	Pender (POL)	W 5-1	1 Q	—N/a	Manko (UKR); W 15-2	Sun (CHN); W 15-6	Shaburov (BLR); W 15-9	1st place, gold medalist(s)
Piers Gilliver	Men's individual épée A	Giordan (ITA)	W 5-2	1 Q	—N/a	Manko (UKR); W 15-2	Sun (CHN); W 15-6	Shaburov (BLR); W 15-9	1st place, gold medalist(s)
Piers Gilliver	Men's individual épée A	Yusupov (RPC)	W 5-4	1 Q	—N/a	Manko (UKR); W 15-2	Sun (CHN); W 15-6	Shaburov (BLR); W 15-9	1st place, gold medalist(s)
Piers Gilliver	Men's individual épée A	Sun (CHN)	W 5-1	1 Q	—N/a	Manko (UKR); W 15-2	Sun (CHN); W 15-6	Shaburov (BLR); W 15-9	1st place, gold medalist(s)
Piers Gilliver	Men's individual Sabre A	Noble (FRA)	W 5-0	3 Q	Li (CHN); L 12-15	Did not advance			11
Piers Gilliver	Men's individual Sabre A	Nagaev (UKR)	W 5-2	3 Q	Li (CHN); L 12-15	Did not advance			11
Piers Gilliver	Men's individual Sabre A	Manko (UKR)	L 2-5	3 Q	Li (CHN); L 12-15	Did not advance			11
Piers Gilliver	Men's individual Sabre A	Tian (CHN)	L 0-5	3 Q	Li (CHN); L 12-15	Did not advance			11

Teams

Athlete	Event	Qualification			Semifinal	Final / GM / BM	
Athlete	Event	Opposition	Score	Rank	Opposition Score	Opposition Score	Rank
Dimitri Coutya; Piers Gulliver; Oliver Lam-Watson	Men's Team foil	RPC (RPC)	W 45-44	1 Q	France (FRA); W 45-35	China (CHN); L 38-45	2nd place, silver medalist(s)
Dimitri Coutya; Piers Gulliver; Oliver Lam-Watson	Men's Team foil	Ukraine (UKR)	W 45-21	1 Q	France (FRA); W 45-35	China (CHN); L 38-45	2nd place, silver medalist(s)
Dimitri Coutya; Piers Gulliver; Oliver Lam-Watson	Men's Team foil	Italy (ITA)	W 45-37	1 Q	France (FRA); W 45-35	China (CHN); L 38-45	2nd place, silver medalist(s)
Dimitri Coutya; Piers Gulliver; Oliver Lam-Watson	Men's Team épée	France (FRA)	W 45-29	1 Q	RPC (RPC); L 35-45	Ukraine (UKR); W 45-38	3rd place, bronze medalist(s)
Dimitri Coutya; Piers Gulliver; Oliver Lam-Watson	Men's Team épée	Ukraine (UKR)	W 45-28	1 Q	RPC (RPC); L 35-45	Ukraine (UKR); W 45-38	3rd place, bronze medalist(s)
Dimitri Coutya; Piers Gulliver; Oliver Lam-Watson	Men's Team épée	Poland (POL)	W 45-30	1 Q	RPC (RPC); L 35-45	Ukraine (UKR); W 45-38	3rd place, bronze medalist(s)

== Wheelchair rugby ==
Great Britain national wheelchair rugby team qualified for the Games for the games by finishing top two at the 2019 European Championship Division A in Vejle.

Squad

On 2 June 2021, the full Great Britain squad for the tournament was announced

- Chris Ryan (cc)
- Gavin Walker (cc)
- Ayaz Bhuta
- Jonathan Coggan
- Ryan Cowling
- Nicholas Cummins
- Kylie Grimes
- Aaron Phipps
- Jim Roberts
- Stuart Robinson
- Jack Smith
- Jamie Stead

cc = co-captain

Standings - Group B

Squad	Group stage				Semifinal	Final	Rank
Squad	Opposition Result	Opposition Result	Opposition Result	Rank	Opposition Result	Opposition Result	Rank
Great Britain national team	Canada; W 50–47	New Zealand; W 60–37	United States; L 48-50	2 Q	Japan; W 55-49	United States; W 54-49	1st place, gold medalist(s)

Group stage

Pos	Team	Pld	W	D	L	GF	GA	GD	Pts	Qualification
1	United States	3	3	0	0	171	137	+34	6	Semi-finals
2	Great Britain	3	2	0	1	158	134	+24	4	Semi-finals
3	Canada	3	1	0	2	152	144	+8	2	Fifth place Match
4	New Zealand	3	0	0	3	108	174	−66	0	Seventh place Match

Source: Tokyo2020
25 August 2021
12:45

Canada	47–50	Great Britain

Yoyogi National Stadium, Tokyo

26 August 2021
12:45

New Zealand	37–60	Great Britain

Yoyogi National Stadium, Tokyo

27 August 2021
12:45

United States	50–48	Great Britain

Yoyogi National Stadium, Tokyo

Semi-final

28 August 2021
20:00

Japan	49–55	Great Britain

Yoyogi National Stadium, Tokyo

Final (gold-medal match)

29 August 2021
20:00

United States	49–54	Great Britain

Yoyogi National Stadium, Tokyo

== Wheelchair tennis ==
Great Britain qualified seven players entries for wheelchair tennis. Six of them qualified by the world rankings, while one of them qualified by received the bipartite commission invitation allocation quotas.

Athlete	Event	Round of 64	Round of 32	Round of 16	Quarterfinals	Semifinals	Final / BM	
Athlete	Event	Opposition Result	Opposition Result	Opposition Result	Opposition Result	Opposition Result	Opposition Result	Rank
Dermot Bailey	Men's singles	Caverzaschi (ESP); L 0-6, 2-6	Did not advance					
Alfie Hewett	Men's singles	Bye	Fabisiak (POL); W 6-1, 6-2	Spaargaren (NED); W 6-1, 2-6, 6-3	Peifer (FRA); W 6-3, 6-4	Egberink (NED); L 4-6, 6-7^{(5-7)}	Reid (GBR); L 4-6, 6-3, 5-7	4
Gordon Reid	Men's singles	Bye	Els (RSA); W 6-2, 6-0	Sanada (JPN); W 6-2, 6-1	Fernández (ARG); W 7-5, 3-6, 6-1	Kunieda (JPN); L 3-6, 2-6	Hewett (GBR); W 6-4, 3-6, 7-5	3rd place, bronze medalist(s)
Alfie Hewett; Gordon Reid	Men's doubles	—N/a	Bye	Flax/Langmann (AUT); W 6-0, 6-0	Gerard/Vandorpe (BEL); W 6-2, 6-2	Kunieda/Sanada (JPN); W 6-2, 6-1	Houdet/Peifer (FRA); L 5-7, 6-0, 6-7^{(3-7)}	2nd place, silver medalist(s)
Lucy Shuker	Women's singles	—N/a	Un (TUR); W 6-0, 6-0	Zhu (CHN); L 6-7^{(2-7)}, 2-6	Did not advance			
Jordanne Whiley	Women's singles	—N/a	Bernal (COL); W 6-0, 6-3	Tanaka (JPN); W 6-1, 6-0	Mathewson (USA); W 6-3, 3-6, 7-5	de Groot (NED); L 4-6, 2-6	van Koot (NED); W 6-4, 6-7^{(7-9)}, 6-4	3rd place, bronze medalist(s)
Lucy Shuker; Jordanne Whiley	Women's doubles	—N/a		Bye	Montjane/Venter (RSA); W 6-2, 6-0	Wang/Zhu (CHN); W 6-4, 6-2	de Groot/van Koot (NED); L 0-6, 1-6	2nd place, silver medalist(s)
Antony Cotterill	Quad singles	—N/a		Davidson (AUS); L 1-6, 0-6	Did not advance			
Andy Lapthorne	Quad singles	—N/a		Shaw (CAN); W 6-1, 6-2	Vink (NED); L 4-6, 1-6	Did not advance		
Antony Cotterill; Andy Lapthorne	Quad doubles	—N/a			Kim K-s/Kim M-j (KOR); W 6-2, 6-0	Schröder/Vink (NED); L 0-6, 2-6	Moroishi/Sugeno (JPN); L 5-7, 6-3, 5-7	4

== See also ==
- Great Britain at the Paralympics
- Great Britain at the 2020 Summer Olympics
