= Swimming at the 2020 Summer Paralympics – Women's 200 metre freestyle S14 =

Women's 200 metre freestyle S14 at the XVI Paralympic Games
- Venue: Tokyo Aquatics Centre
- Dates: 27 August 2021
- Competitors: 12 from 8 nations

Medalists
| 1st place, gold medalist(s) | | Valeriia Shabalina | RPC |
| 2nd place, silver medalist(s) | | Bethany Firth | Great Britain |
| 3rd place, bronze medalist(s) | | Jessica-Jane Applegate | Great Britain |

The Women's 200 metre freestyle S14 event at the 2020 Paralympic Games took place on 27 August 2021, at the Tokyo Aquatics Centre.

== Heats ==
The swimmers with the top eight times, regardless of heat, advanced to the final.

| Rank | Heat | Lane | Name | Nationality | Time | Notes |
|---|---|---|---|---|---|---|
| 1 | 2 | 4 | Valeriia Shabalina | RPC | 2:09.55 | Q |
| 2 | 1 | 4 | Bethany Firth | Great Britain | 2:10.58 | Q |
| 3 | 2 | 5 | Jessica-Jane Applegate | Great Britain | 2:10.83 | Q |
| 4 | 1 | 5 | Louise Fiddes | Great Britain | 2:11.62 | Q |
| 5 | 2 | 3 | Pernilla Lindberg | Sweden | 2:12.86 | Q |
| 6 | 2 | 6 | Angela Marina | Canada | 2:16.19 | Q |
| 7 | 1 | 3 | Ruby Storm | Australia | 2:17.88 | Q |
| 8 | 1 | 6 | Michelle Alonso Morales | Spain | 2:18.39 | Q |
| 9 | 1 | 2 | Chan Yui-lam | Hong Kong | 2:20.37 | |
| 10 | 2 | 7 | Janina Falk | Austria | 2:20.39 | |
| 11 | 2 | 2 | Eva Coronado Tejeda | Spain | 2:23.13 | |
| 12 | 1 | 7 | Olga Poteshkina | RPC | 2:23.94 | |

== Final ==
| Rank | Lane | Name | Nationality | Time | Notes |
|---|---|---|---|---|---|
| 1st place, gold medalist(s) | 4 | Valeriia Shabalina | RPC | 2:03.71 | |
| 2nd place, silver medalist(s) | 5 | Bethany Firth | Great Britain | 2:03.99 | |
| 3rd place, bronze medalist(s) | 3 | Jessica-Jane Applegate | Great Britain | 2:09.53 | |
| 4 | 6 | Louise Fiddes | Great Britain | 2:11.20 | |
| 5 | 2 | Pernilla Lindberg | Sweden | 2:12.33 | |
| 6 | 7 | Angela Marina | Canada | 2:15.43 | |
| 7 | 1 | Ruby Storm | Australia | 2:17.33 | |
| 8 | 8 | Michelle Alonso Morales | Spain | 2:19.67 | |
