= Swimming at the 2020 Summer Paralympics – Women's 200 metre individual medley SM14 =

Women's 200 metre individual medley SM14 at the XVI Paralympic Games
- Venue: Tokyo Aquatics Centre
- Dates: 31 August 2021
- Competitors: 18 from 10 nations

Medalists
1st place, gold medalist(s)		Valeriia Shabalina	RPC
2nd place, silver medalist(s)		Bethany Firth	Great Britain
3rd place, bronze medalist(s)		Louise Fiddes	Great Britain

The Women's 200 metre individual medley SM14 event at the 2020 Paralympic Games took place on 31 August 2021, at the Tokyo Aquatics Centre.

== Heats ==
The swimmers with the top eight times, regardless of heat, advanced to the final.

Rank	Heat	Lane	Name	Nationality	Time	Notes
1	2	4	Valeriia Shabalina	RPC	2:26.84	Q
2	3	4	Bethany Firth	Great Britain	2:27.16	Q
3	3	5	Jessica-Jane Applegate	Great Britain	2:31.48	Q
4	2	5	Paige Leonhardt	Australia	2:32.70	Q
5	1	4	Louise Fiddes	Great Britain	2:33.17	Q
6	3	3	Pernilla Lindberg	Sweden	2:34.02	Q
7	3	6	Mami Inoue	Japan	2:36.60	Q
8	3	2	Ruby Storm	Australia	2:36.74	Q
9	1	3	Janina Falk	Austria	2:37.51	
10	1	5	Chan Yui-lam	Hong Kong	2:37.70	
11	1	7	Cheung Ho Ying	Hong Kong	2:38.46	
12	1	6	Angela Marina	Canada	2:38.97	
13	2	6	Ashley van Rijswijk	Australia	2:39.10	
14	2	3	Syuci Indriani	Indonesia	2:40.46	
15	2	2	Olga Poteshkina	RPC	2:44.45	
16	2	7	Ana Karolina Soares	Brazil	2:47.37	
17	1	2	Beatriz Borges Carneiro	Brazil	2:48.48	
18	3	7	Débora Borges Carneiro	Brazil	2:48.58	

== Final ==
Rank	Lane	Name	Nationality	Time	Notes
1st place, gold medalist(s)	4	Valeriia Shabalina	RPC	2:20.99	
2nd place, silver medalist(s)	5	Bethany Firth	Great Britain	2:23.19	
3rd place, bronze medalist(s)	2	Louise Fiddes	Great Britain	2:29.21	
4	3	Jessica-Jane Applegate	Great Britain	2:30.43	
5	7	Pernilla Lindberg	Sweden	2:32.01	
6	6	Paige Leonhardt	Australia	2:32.69	
7	8	Ruby Storm	Australia	2:36.58	
8	1	Mami Inoue	Japan	2:37.86	
