= Swimming at the 2020 Summer Paralympics – Women's 100 metre butterfly S14 =

Women's 100 metre butterfly S14 at the XVI Paralympic Games
- Venue: Tokyo Aquatics Centre
- Dates: 25 August 2021
- Competitors: 15 from 10 nations

Medalists
1st place, gold medalist(s)		Valeriia Shabalina	RPC
2nd place, silver medalist(s)		Paige Leonhardt	Australia
3rd place, bronze medalist(s)		Ruby Storm	Australia

The Women's 100 metre butterfly S14 event at the 2020 Paralympic Games took place on 25 August 2021 at the Tokyo Aquatics Centre.

== Heats ==
The swimmers with the top eight times, regardless of heat, advanced to the final.

Rank	Heat	Lane	Name	Nationality	Time	Notes
1	2	4	Valeriia Shabalina	RPC	1:05.37	Q, PR
2	2	5	Paige Leonhardt	Australia	1:06.93	Q
3	1	5	Chan Yui-lam	Hong Kong	1:07.20	Q
4	1	4	Jessica-Jane Applegate	Great Britain	1:07.57	Q
5	2	3	Louise Fiddes	Great Britain	1:07.68	Q
6	1	3	Ruby Storm	Australia	1:07.77	Q
7	1	6	Moemi Kinoshita	Japan	1:10.53	Q
8	1	7	Cheung Ho Ying	Hong Kong	1:10.68	Q
9	2	1	Kang Jung-eun	South Korea	1:11.36	
10	1	1	Pernilla Lindberg	Sweden	1:11.79	
11	2	7	Angela Marina	Canada	1:12.00	
12	1	2	Mami Inoue	Japan	1:12.08	
13	2	2	Syuci Indriani	Indonesia	1:12.13	
14	2	6	Janina Falk	Austria	1:13.62	
15	2	8	Olga Poteshkina	RPC	1:15.46	

== Final ==
Rank	Lane	Name	Nationality	Time	Notes
1st place, gold medalist(s)	4	Valeriia Shabalina	RPC	1:03.59	WR
2nd place, silver medalist(s)	5	Paige Leonhardt	Australia	1:05.48	
3rd place, bronze medalist(s)	7	Ruby Storm	Australia	1:06.50	
4	3	Chan Yui-lam	Hong Kong	1:06.65	
5	2	Louise Fiddes	Great Britain	1:07.24	
6	6	Jessica-Jane Applegate	Great Britain	1:07.69	
7	1	Moemi Kinoshita	Japan	1:10.25	
8	8	Cheung Ho Ying	Hong Kong	1:11.29	
