= Swimming at the 2020 Summer Paralympics – Women's 100 metre breaststroke SB14 =

Women's 100 metre breaststroke SB14 at the XVI Paralympic Games
- Venue: Tokyo Aquatics Centre
- Dates: 29 August 2021
- Competitors: 15 from 12 nations

Medalists
1st place, gold medalist(s)		Michelle Alonso Morales	Spain
2nd place, silver medalist(s)		Louise Fiddes	Great Britain
3rd place, bronze medalist(s)		Beatriz Borges Carneiro	Brazil

The Women's 100 metre breaststroke S14 event at the 2020 Paralympic Games took place on 29 August 2021, at the Tokyo Aquatics Centre.

== Heats ==
The swimmers with the top eight times, regardless of heat, advanced to the final.

Rank	Heat	Lane	Name	Nationality	Time	Notes
1	2	4	Michelle Alonso Morales	Spain	1:13.35	Q
2	2	5	Paige Leonhardt	Australia	1:17.80	Q
3	2	3	Beatriz Borges Carneiro	Brazil	1:18.34	Q
4	1	3	Ashley van Rijswijk	Australia	1:18.43	Q
5	1	5	Débora Borges Carneiro	Brazil	1:18.55	Q
6	1	4	Louise Fiddes	Great Britain	1:18.64	Q
7	1	6	Mikika Serizawa	Japan	1:19.39	Q
8	2	7	Pernilla Lindberg	Sweden	1:21.37	Q
9	2	6	Valeriia Shabalina	RPC	1:21.86	
10	2	2	Syuci Indriani	Indonesia	1:24.06	
11	2	1	Chan Yui-lam	Hong Kong	1:25.02	
12	1	7	Giorgia Marchi	Italy	1:26.44	
13	1	1	Angela Marina	Canada	1:27.61	
14	1	2	Janina Falk	Austria	1:28.68	
15	2	8	Olga Poteshkina	RPC	1:31.19	

== Final ==
Rank	Lane	Name	Nationality	Time	Notes
1st place, gold medalist(s)	4	Michelle Alonso Morales	Spain	1:12.02	WR
2nd place, silver medalist(s)	7	Louise Fiddes	Great Britain	1:15.93	
3rd place, bronze medalist(s)	3	Beatriz Borges Carneiro	Brazil	1:17.61	
4	2	Débora Borges Carneiro	Brazil	1:17.63	
5	6	Ashley van Rijswijk	Australia	1:17.84	
6	5	Paige Leonhardt	Australia	1:17.90	
7	1	Mikika Serizawa	Japan	1:20.09	
8	8	Pernilla Lindberg	Sweden	1:21.56	
