= Swimming at the 2020 Summer Paralympics – Women's 200 metre freestyle =

The Women's 200 metre freestyle swimming events for the 2020 Summer Paralympics took place at the Tokyo Aquatics Centre from August 25 to August 27, 2021. A total of 2 events were contested over this distance.

== Schedule ==
H	Heats	½	Semifinals	F	Final

Date	Wed 25		Thu 26		Fri 27	
Event	M	E	M	E	M	E
S5 200m	H	F				
S14 200m					H	F

== Medal summary ==
The following is a summary of the medals awarded across all 200 metre freestyle events.

Classification	Gold		Silver		Bronze	
S5	Zhang Li; China	2:46.53	Tully Kearney; Great Britain	2:46.65	Monica Boggioni; Italy	2:55.70
S14	Valeriia Shabalina; RPC	2:03.71	Bethany Firth; Great Britain	2:03.99	Jessica-Jane Applegate; Great Britain	2:09.53

== Results ==
The following were the results of the finals only of each of the Women's 200 metre freestyle events in each of the classifications. Further details of each event, including where appropriate heats and semi finals results, are available on that event's dedicated page.

=== S5 ===
The S5 category is for swimmers who have hemiplegia, paraplegia, or short stature.

The final in this classification took place on 25 August 2021:

Rank	Lane	Name	Nationality	Time	Notes
1st place, gold medalist(s)	6	Zhang Li	China	2:46.53	
2nd place, silver medalist(s)	4	Tully Kearney	Great Britain	2:46.65	
3rd place, bronze medalist(s)	5	Monica Boggioni	Italy	2:55.70	
4	3	Suzanna Hext	Great Britain	2:59.55	
5	2	Yao Cuan	China	3:00.72	
6	7	Maori Yui	Japan	3:14.58	
7	1	Sümeyye Boyacı	Turkey	3:17.23	
8	8	Sevilay Öztürk	Turkey	3:29.05	

=== S14 ===
The S14 category is for swimmers who have an intellectual impairment.

The final in this classification will take place on 27 August 2021:

Rank	Lane	Name	Nationality	Time	Notes
1st place, gold medalist(s)	4	Valeriia Shabalina	RPC	2:03.71	
2nd place, silver medalist(s)	5	Bethany Firth	Great Britain	2:03.99	
3rd place, bronze medalist(s)	3	Jessica-Jane Applegate	Great Britain	2:09.53	
4	6	Louise Fiddes	Great Britain	2:11.20	
5	2	Pernilla Lindberg	Sweden	2:12.33	
6	7	Angela Marina	Canada	2:15.43	
7	1	Ruby Storm	Australia	2:17.33	
8	8	Michelle Alonso Morales	Spain	2:19.67	
