= Cycling at the 2016 Summer Paralympics – Women's individual pursuit C5 =

Women's individual pursuit C5 at the XV Paralympic Games
- Dates: 8 September
- Competitors: 9 from 7 nations

Medalists
1st place, gold medalist(s)		Sarah Storey	Great Britain
2nd place, silver medalist(s)		Crystal Lane	Great Britain
3rd place, bronze medalist(s)		Samantha Bosco	United States

The women's individual pursuit C5 took place on 8 September 2016.

The event began with a qualifying race over 3000 m. Each of the nine athletes competed individually in a time-trial basis. The fastest two riders raced for the gold medal and the third- and fourth-fastest riders raced for the bronze.

== Preliminaries ==
Q: Qualifier
WR: World Record
PR: Paralympic Record

Rank	Name	Country	Time
1	Sarah Storey	Great Britain	3:31.394 Q WR
2	Crystal Lane	Great Britain	3:48.802 Q
3	Samantha Bosco	United States	3:52.887 Q
4	Anna Harkowska	Poland	3:53.745 Q
5	Jufang Zhou	China	3:56.486
6	Jennifer Schuble	United States	3:57.590
7	Mariela Analia Delgado	Argentina	4:00.969
8	Kerstin Brachtendorf	Germany	4:01.233
9	Nicole Clermont	Canada	4:08.557

== Finals ==
Gold medal match

Name	Time	Rank
Sarah Storey (GBR)	caught opponent	1st place, gold medalist(s)
Crystal Lane (GBR)		2nd place, silver medalist(s)

Bronze medal match

Name	Time	Rank
Samantha Bosco (USA)	3:54.697	3rd place, bronze medalist(s)
Anna Harkowska (POL)	3:54.701	4
