= Swimming at the 2020 Summer Paralympics – Women's 200 metre freestyle S5 =

Women's 200 metre freestyle S5 at the XVI Paralympic Games
- Venue: Tokyo Aquatics Centre
- Dates: 25 August 2021
- Competitors: 11 from 8 nations

Medalists
1st place, gold medalist(s)		Zhang Li	China
2nd place, silver medalist(s)		Tully Kearney	Great Britain
3rd place, bronze medalist(s)		Monica Boggioni	Italy

The Women's 200 metre freestyle S5 event at the 2020 Paralympic Games took place on 25 August 2021, at the Tokyo Aquatics Centre.

== Heats ==
The swimmers with the top eight times, regardless of heat, advanced to the final.

Rank	Heat	Lane	Name	Nationality	Time	Notes
1	2	4	Tully Kearney	Great Britain	2:52.30	Q
2	2	5	Monica Boggioni	Italy	2:53.67	Q
3	1	5	Suzanna Hext	Great Britain	2:59.05	Q
4	1	4	Zhang Li	China	2:59.24	Q
5	2	3	Yao Cuan	China	3:04.92	Q
6	1	3	Maori Yui	Japan	3:11.12	Q
7	2	6	Sümeyye Boyacı	Turkey	3:15.75	Q
8	1	2	Sevilay Öztürk	Turkey	3:17.30	Q
9	2	2	Esthefany Rodrigues	Brazil	3:27.41	
10	1	6	Elizabeth Noriega	Argentina	3:30.65	
11	2	7	Dunia Felices	Peru	3:46.77	

== Final ==
200m freestyle final
Rank	Lane	Name	Nationality	Time	Notes
1st place, gold medalist(s)	6	Zhang Li	China	2:46.53	
2nd place, silver medalist(s)	4	Tully Kearney	Great Britain	2:46.65	
3rd place, bronze medalist(s)	5	Monica Boggioni	Italy	2:55.70	
4	3	Suzanna Hext	Great Britain	2:59.55	
5	2	Yao Cuan	China	3:00.72	
6	7	Maori Yui	Japan	3:14.58	
7	1	Sümeyye Boyacı	Turkey	3:17.23	
8	8	Sevilay Öztürk	Turkey	3:29.05	
