= Cycling at the 2020 Summer Paralympics – Women's road race C4–5 =

Women's road race C4–5 at the XVI Paralympic Games
- Venue: Fuji Speedway
- Dates: 2 September 2021
- Competitors: 14 from 11 nations
- Winning time: 2:21:51

Medalists
1st place, gold medalist(s)		Sarah Storey	Great Britain
2nd place, silver medalist(s)		Crystal Lane-Wright	Great Britain
3rd place, bronze medalist(s)		Marie Patouillet	France

The women's road race C4-5 cycling event at the 2020 Summer Paralympics took place on 2 September 2021, at the Fuji Speedway in Shizuoka Prefecture. 15 riders competed in the event.

The event covers the following two classifications, that all use standard bicycles:

- C4: cyclists with mild hemiplegic or diplegic spasticity; mild athetosis or ataxia; unilateral below-knee or bilateral below elbow amputation, etc. tetraplegics with severe upper limb impairment to the C6 vertebra.
- C5: cyclists with mild monoplegic spasticity; unilateral arm amputation (above or below elbow), etcetera.

== Results ==
The event took place on 2 September 2021 at 8:30:

Rank	Rider	Nationality	Class	Time	Deficit
1st place, gold medalist(s)	Sarah Storey	Great Britain	C5	2:21:51	
2nd place, silver medalist(s)	Crystal Lane-Wright	Great Britain	C5	2:21:58	+0.07
3rd place, bronze medalist(s)	Marie Patouillet	France	C5	2:23:49	+1:58
4	Paula Ossa	Colombia	C5	2:23:49	+1:58
5	Kerstin Brachtendorf	Germany	C5	2:24:16	+2:25
6	Nicole Murray	New Zealand	C5	2:25:27	+3:36
7	Mariela Delgado	Argentina	C5	2:31:14	+9:23
8	Meg Lemon	Australia	C4	2:31:17	+9:26
9	Shawn Morelli	United States	C4	2:31:21	+9:30
10	Emily Petricola	Australia	C4	2:32:58	+11:07
11	Alina Punina	RPC	C5	2:46:38	+24:47
12	Ruan Jianping	China	C4	-1 LAP	
13	Keely Shaw	Canada	C4	-1 LAP	
14	Ana Raquel Montenegro Batista Lins	Brazil	C5	-1 LAP	
	Katell Alençon	France	C4	DNF	
