= Paige Leonhardt =

Australian Paralympic swimmer (born 2000)

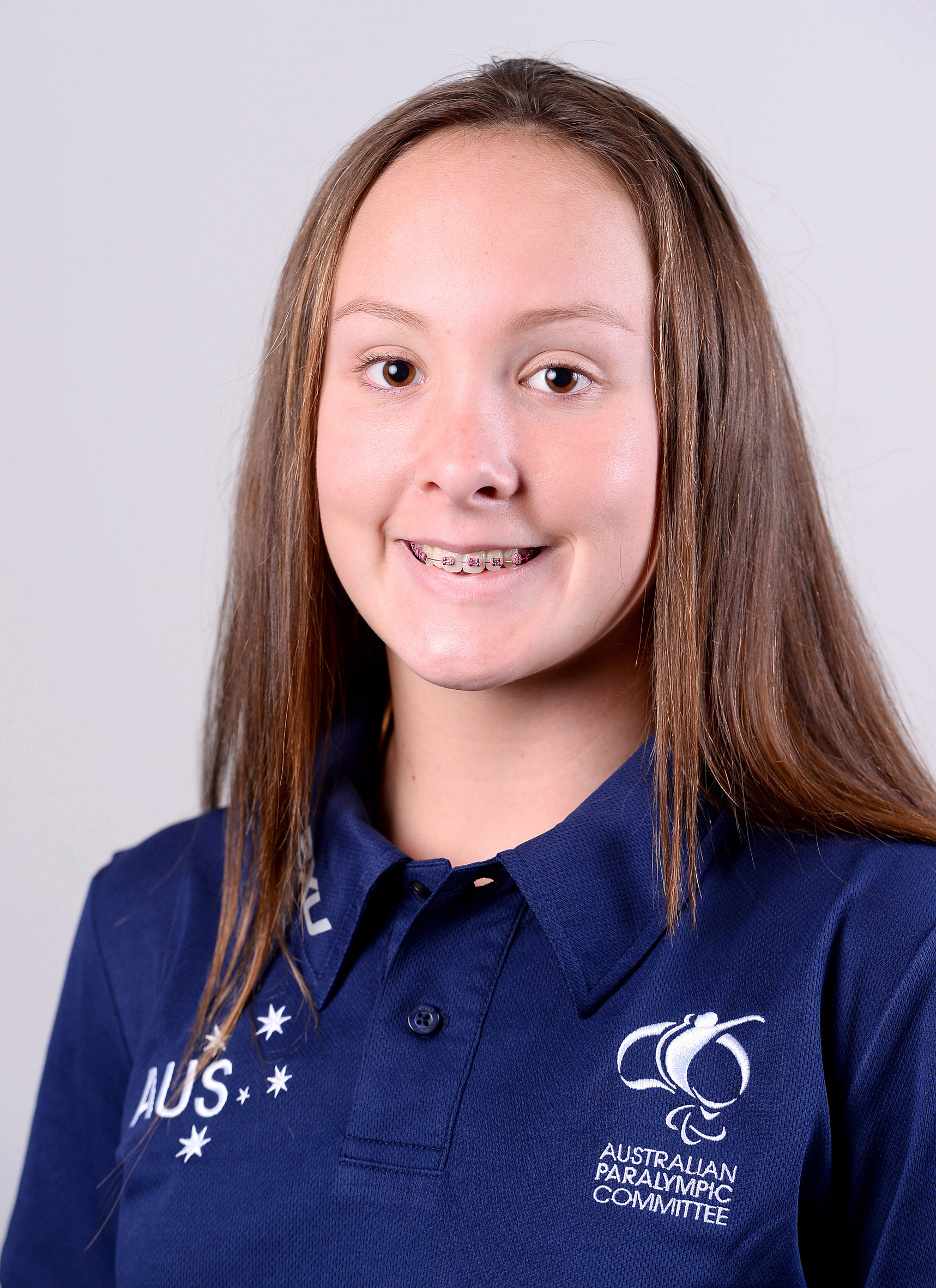
- 2016 Australian Paralympic team portrait

Personal information
- Nationality: Australia/Canada
- Born: 21 September 2000 (age 26) Penrith, NSW, Australia

Sport
- Sport: Swimming
- Classifications: S14
- Club: Sharks Aquatics
- College team: Carmel College, Thornlands QLD
- Coach: Paige Leonhardt
Medal record
Women's paralympic swimming
Representing Australia
Paralympic Games
| Silver medal – second place | 2020 Tokyo | 100 m butterfly S14 |
World Para Swimming Championships
| Gold medal – first place | 2022 Madeira | 100 m butterfly S14 |
| Silver medal – second place | 2022 Madeira | 100 m breaststroke SB14 |
| Silver medal – second place | 2022 Madeira | Mixed 4 × 100 m medley relay S14 |
| Gold medal – first place | 2023 Manchester | Mixed 4 × 100 m medley relay 49 pts |
| Bronze medal – third place | 2023 Manchester | 100 m breaststroke SB14 |
Commonwealth Games
| Silver medal – second place | 2018 Gold Coast | 100 m breastroke SB9 |

Paige Leonhardt (born 21 September 2000) is an Australian swimmer. She represented Australia at the 2016 Rio Paralympics, 2020 Tokyo Paralympics, where she won a silver medal and the 2024 Paris Paralympics.

== Personal life ==
Leonhardt was born on 21 September 2000. At the age of five she was involved in a car accident that left her with severe injuries. She spent four years recovering. The accident left her with hemiplegia cerebral palsy on her right side as well as intercranial hypertension, epilepsy and autism. The intercranial hypertension means that she regularly needs to have excess fluid on the brain removed via a spinal tap. The calcium build-up behind her eyes causes drusen which will one day lead to a loss of eyesight. She now lives in Mount Cotton, Queensland, previously lived in Port Macquarie which is also the home of wheelchair rugby gold medallist Ryley Batt who is her idol. She previously attended St Joseph's Regional College in Port Macquarie.

Since 2018, she is an ambassador for Variety the Children's charity.

== Career ==
Leonhardt is classified as a S14 swimmer. She was previously classed as an S10 swimmer for athletes with physical impairment however the International Paralympic Committee deemed her very mild physical impairment to not meet the eligible criteria for inclusion in Paralympic sport. As she was deemed ineligible, she now competes in the S14 class for athletes with intellectual impairment. She took up squad swimming in March 2012 to assist her rehabilitation. At the 2013 McDonald's Queensland Multi Class Championships, she swam in 11 events and won seven gold and four silver medals. At the 2014 Australian Swimming Championships, she won the bronze medal in 50m Breaststroke Multi-class. At the 2015 Australian Swimming Championships, she won the bronze medal in 50m Breaststroke Multi-classand made the final of the 100m Breaststroke Multi-class. In multi-class events at the 2015 Australian Age Championships, she won silver in the 50m Breaststroke as well as bronze in the 50m Freestyle and 100m Freestyle. At the 2016 Australian Swimming Championships, she won bronze medal in the Women's 100m Breaststroke Multi-class in a personal best time of 1.21.31. This was the fourth fastest time clocked in the world this year. She also finished fifth in the Women's 200m Medley Multi-class in a personal best time of 2.39.11 and seventh in the Women's 100m Butterfly Multi-class in 1.11.53.

She competed at the 2016 Rio Paralympics in six events. She qualified for the final in Women's 100m butterfly S10 finishing in sixth place and Women's 100m breaststroke finishing sixth. She also competed in the following events but didn't progress to the finals: Women's 50m freestyle S10, Women's 100m Freestyle S10, Women's 100m Backstroke S10 and Women's 200m Individual Medley SM10.

At the 2018 Commonwealth Games, Gold Coast, she won the silver medal in the Women's 100m Breaststroke SB9 and finished fourth in the Women's 100m Individual Medley SM10.

At the 2020 Tokyo Paralympics, Leonhardt won the silver medal in the Women's 100 m Butterfly S14 with a time of 1:05.48, less than 2 seconds behind Valeriia Shabalina of RPC who set a world record. She qualified for the finals of the Women's 100 m Breaststroke SB14 and Women's 200 m Individual Medley SM14 but could only manage sixth.

At the 2022 World Para Swimming Championships, Madeira, Leonhardt won three medals - gold in the Women's 100 m Butterfly S14 and silver in the Women's 100 m breaststroke SB14 and Mixed 4 × 100 m Medley relay S14. She did not medal in two other events. At the 2023 World Para Swimming Championships, Manchester, England, she won a gold medal in the Mixed 4 × 100 m Medley Relay 49 pts and the bronze medal in the Women's 100 m breaststroke SB14.

At the 2024 Paris Paralympics, she competed in three events - Women's 100 m butterfly S14 (7th), Women's 100 m breaststroke S14 (4th) and Women's 200 m individual medley Sm14 (8th).

Leonhardt said "swimming is the only place where she feels like everyone else". In 2014, she jointly awarded the Junior Sportsperson (18 and under) at the Port Macquarie Hasting Sports Awards.

== Recognition ==
- 2022 - Sport Australia Hall of Fame Scholarship Holder – Tier 3
