= Swimming at the 2020 Summer Paralympics – Men's 100 metre butterfly S12 =

Men's 100 metre butterfly S12 at the XVI Paralympic Games
- Venue: Tokyo Aquatics Centre
- Dates: 3 September 2021
- Competitors: 10 from 7 nations

Medalists
1st place, gold medalist(s)		Raman Salei	Azerbaijan
2nd place, silver medalist(s)		Stephen Clegg	Great Britain
3rd place, bronze medalist(s)		Roman Makarov	RPC

The men's 100 metre butterfly S12 event at the 2020 Paralympic Games took place on 3 September 2021, at the Tokyo Aquatics Centre.

== Heats ==
The swimmers with the top eight times, regardless of heat, advanced to the final.

Rank	Heat	Lane	Name	Nationality	Time	Notes
1	1	4	Raman Salei	Azerbaijan	58.99	Q
2	2	4	Stephen Clegg	Great Britain	59.13	Q
3	1	5	Braedan Jason	Australia	59.58	Q
4	2	3	Illia Yaremenko	Ukraine	59.72	Q
5	2	5	Roman Makarov	RPC	1:00.00	Q
6	1	3	Danylo Chufarov	Ukraine	1:01.04	Q
7	2	2	Daniel Giraldo Correa	Colombia	1:01.77	Q
8	2	6	Maksim Vashkevich	Belarus	1:01.87	Q
9	1	6	Sergey Punko	RPC	1:06.63	
10	1	2	Vali Israfilov	Azerbaijan	1:10.59	

== Final ==
100m butterfly final
Rank	Lane	Name	Nationality	Time	Notes
1st place, gold medalist(s)	4	Raman Salei	Azerbaijan	57.81	
2nd place, silver medalist(s)	2	Stephen Clegg	Great Britain	57.87	
3rd place, bronze medalist(s)	5	Roman Makarov	RPC	58.65	
4	6	Illia Yaremenko	Ukraine	58.98	
5	7	Danylo Chufarov	Ukraine	59.00	
6	3	Braedan Jason	Australia	59.01	OC
7	8	Maksim Vashkevich	Belarus	1.10.43	
8	1	Daniel Giraldo Correa	Colombia	1.02.42	
