= Swimming at the 2020 Summer Paralympics – Women's 100 metre freestyle S5 =

Women's 100 metre freestyle S5 at the XVI Paralympic Games
- Venue: Tokyo Aquatics Centre
- Dates: 26 August 2021
- Competitors: 16 from 9 nations

Medalists
1st place, gold medalist(s)		Tully Kearney	Great Britain
2nd place, silver medalist(s)		Zhang Li	China
3rd place, bronze medalist(s)		Monica Boggioni	Italy

The Women's 100 metre freestyle S5 event at the 2020 Paralympic Games took place on 26 August 2021, at the Tokyo Aquatics Centre.

== Heats ==
The swimmers with the top eight times, regardless of heat, advanced to the final.

Rank	Heat	Lane	Name	Nationality	Time	Notes
1	2	4	Tully Kearney	Great Britain	1:19.60	Q
2	2	5	Suzanna Hext	Great Britain	1:21.69	Q
3	1	4	Zhang Li	China	1:22.09	Q
4	1	5	Monica Boggioni	Italy	1:22.62	Q
5	2	6	Teresa Perales	Spain	1:23.48	Q
6	2	1	Lu Dong	China	1:25.69	Q
7	2	3	Yao Cuan	China	1:26.52	Q
8	1	3	Joana Maria Silva	Brazil	1:27.36	Q
9	1	6	Mayumi Narita	Japan	1:29.48	
10	1	2	Maori Yui	Japan	1:34.39	
11	2	2	Rachael Watson	Australia	1:35.27	PR
12	2	7	Elizabeth Noriega	Argentina	1:35.46	
13	1	1	Esthefany Rodrigues	Brazil	1:36.45	
14	1	7	Sümeyye Boyacı	Turkey	1:39.41	
15	2	8	Sevilay Öztürk	Turkey	1:42.73	
16	1	8	Susana Schnarndorf	Brazil	1:50.65	

== Final ==
100m freestyle final
Rank	Lane	Name	Nationality	Time	Notes
1st place, gold medalist(s)	4	Tully Kearney	Great Britain	1:14.39	
2nd place, silver medalist(s)	3	Zhang Li	China	1:17.80	
3rd place, bronze medalist(s)	6	Monica Boggioni	Italy	1:22.43	
4	5	Suzanna Hext	Great Britain	1:22.49	
5	2	Teresa Perales	Spain	1:23.31	
6	7	Lu Dong	China	1:23.34	
7	1	Yao Cuan	China	1:26.66	
8	8	Joana Maria Silva	Brazil	1:27.62	
