= Cycling at the 2020 Summer Paralympics – Women's individual pursuit C5 =

Women's individual pursuit C5 at the XVI Paralympic Games
- Venue: Izu Velodrome
- Dates: 25 August 2021
- Competitors: 9 from 8 nations

Medalists
| 1st place, gold medalist(s) | | Sarah Storey | Great Britain |
| 2nd place, silver medalist(s) | | Crystal Lane-Wright | Great Britain |
| 3rd place, bronze medalist(s) | | Marie Patouillet | France |

The women's individual pursuit class C5 track cycling event at the 2020 Summer Paralympics will be taking place on 25 August 2021 at the Izu Velodrome, Japan. This class is for the cyclist who has impairments that affect their legs, arms, and/or trunk; they are still able to use a standard bicycle. 9 cyclists from 8 nations are competing in this event.

== Competition format ==
The competition begins off with the qualifying round: all 9 cyclists are divided into 5 heats, each heat containing 2 cyclists except heat 1 only containing 1 cyclist. They will compete on a time trial basis. The 2 fastest in the qualifying round would qualify to the gold medal final while the 3rd and 4th fastest will qualify to the bronze medal final. The distance of this event is 3000m. The events' finals are held on the same day as the qualifying round.

== Schedule ==
| Date | Time | Round |
|---|---|---|
| 25 August | 11:17 | Qualifying |
| 25 August | 14:25 | Finals |

== Records ==
| World Record | Sarah Storey (GBR)) | 3:31.394 | Rio de Janeiro, Brazil | 8 September 2016 |
| Paralympic Record | Sarah Storey (GBR)) | 3:31.394 | Rio de Janeiro, Brazil | 8 September 2016 |

== Results ==
=== Qualifying ===
| Rank | Heat | Nation | Cyclists | Result | Notes |
|---|---|---|---|---|---|
| 1 | 5 | Great Britain | Sarah Storey | 3:27.057 | QG, WR |
| 2 | 4 | Great Britain | Crystal Lane-Wright | 3:35.061 | QG |
| 3 | 3 | France | Marie Patouillet | 3:38.088 | QB |
| 4 | 5 | New Zealand | Nicole Murray | 3:45.010 | QB |
| 5 | 3 | RPC | Alina Punina | 4:01.898 | |
| 6 | 1 | Colombia | Paula Ossa | 4:07.826 | |
| 7 | 4 | Argentina | Mariela Delgado | 4:07.960 | |
| 8 | 2 | Netherlands | Caroline Groot | 4:18.095 | |
| 9 | 2 | Brazil | Ana Raquel Montenegro | 4:43.704 | |

=== Finals ===
| Rank | Nation | Cyclists | Result | Notes |
|---|---|---|---|---|
Gold medal final
| 1st place, gold medalist(s) | Great Britain | Sarah Storey | | |
| 2nd place, silver medalist(s) | Great Britain | Crystal Lane-Wright | OVL | |
Bronze medal final
| 3rd place, bronze medalist(s) | France | Marie Patouillet | 3:39.233 | |
| 4 | New Zealand | Nicole Murray | 3:44.482 | |
