= Cycling at the 2020 Summer Paralympics – Women's road time trial C5 =

Women's road time trial C5 at the XVI Paralympic Games
- Venue: Fuji Speedway
- Dates: 31 August 2021
- Competitors: 9 from 8 nations
- Winning time: 36:08.90

Medalists
1st place, gold medalist(s)		Sarah Storey	Great Britain
2nd place, silver medalist(s)		Crystal Lane-Wright	Great Britain
3rd place, bronze medalist(s)		Kerstin Brachtendorf	Germany

The women's time trial class C5 road cycling event at the 2020 Summer Paralympics took place on 31 August 2021 at Fuji Speedway, Japan. 9 riders from 8 different nations competed in this event.

The C5 classification is for cyclists with mild monoplegic spasticity; unilateral arm amputation (above or below elbow), etcetera.

== Results ==
The event took place on 31 August 2021, at 8:18:

Rank	Rider	Nationality	Time	Deficit
1st place, gold medalist(s)	Sarah Storey	Great Britain	36:08.90	
2nd place, silver medalist(s)	Crystal Lane-Wright	Great Britain	37:40.89	+1:31.99
3rd place, bronze medalist(s)	Kerstin Brachtendorf	Germany	38:34.49	+2:25.59
4	Marie Patouillet	France	41:09.24	+5:00.34
5	Paula Ossa	Colombia	41:39.89	+5:30.99
6	Nicole Murray	New Zealand	41:45.50	+5:36.60
7	Mariela Delgado	Argentina	43:19.82	+7:10.92
8	Alina Punina	RPC	48:27.51	+12:18.61
9	Ana Raquel Montenegro Batista Lins	Brazil	53:30.61	+17:21.71
