= Swimming at the 2020 Summer Paralympics – Women's 200 metre individual medley SM6 =

Women's 200 metre individual medley SM6 at the XVI Paralympic Games
- Venue: Tokyo Aquatics Centre
- Dates: 26 August 2021
- Competitors: 15 from 8 nations

Medalists
1st place, gold medalist(s)		Maisie Summers-Newton	Great Britain
2nd place, silver medalist(s)		Yelyzaveta Mereshko	Ukraine
3rd place, bronze medalist(s)		Verena Schott	Germany

The Women's 200 metre individual medley S6 event at the 2020 Paralympic Games took place on 26 August 2021, at the Tokyo Aquatics Centre.

== Heats ==
The swimmers with the top eight times, regardless of heat, advanced to the final.

Rank	Heat	Lane	Name	Nationality	Time	Notes
1	2	5	Yelyzaveta Mereshko	Ukraine	2:56.90	Q, WR
2	2	4	Elizabeth Marks	United States	2:57.42	Q
3	1	4	Maisie Summers-Newton	Great Britain	3:00.15	Q
4	2	6	Verena Schott	Germany	3:04.37	Q
5	1	5	Grace Harvey	Great Britain	3:05.84	Q
6	1	3	Eleanor Simmonds	Great Britain	3:07.63	Q
7	1	6	Liu Daomin	China	3:08.05	Q
8	2	2	Sophia Herzog	United States	3:09.48	Q
9	1	2	Anna Hontar	Ukraine	3:15.24	
10	1	7	Evelin Száraz	Hungary	3:17.82	
11	2	7	Sarah Louise Rung	Norway	3:22.75	
12	2	8	Fanni Illés	Hungary	3:28.26	
13	2	1	Anastasiia Zavalii	Ukraine	3:30.36	
14	1	1	Trịnh Thị Bích Như	Vietnam	3:35.16	
15	2	3	Song Lingling	China	DSQ	

== Final ==
200m individual medley final
Rank	Lane	Name	Nationality	Time	Notes
1st place, gold medalist(s)	3	Maisie Summers-Newton	Great Britain	2:56.68	WR
2nd place, silver medalist(s)	4	Yelyzaveta Mereshko	Ukraine	2:58.04	
3rd place, bronze medalist(s)	6	Verena Schott	Germany	2:59.09	
4	5	Elizabeth Marks	United States	3:02.43	
5	7	Eleanor Simmonds	Great Britain	3:04.37	
6	2	Grace Harvey	Great Britain	3:05.58	
7	8	Sophia Herzog	United States	3:07.98	
8	1	Liu Daomin	China	3:10.61	
