= Swimming at the 2020 Summer Paralympics – Men's 100 metre backstroke S12 =

Men's 100 metre backstroke S12 at the XVI Paralympic Games
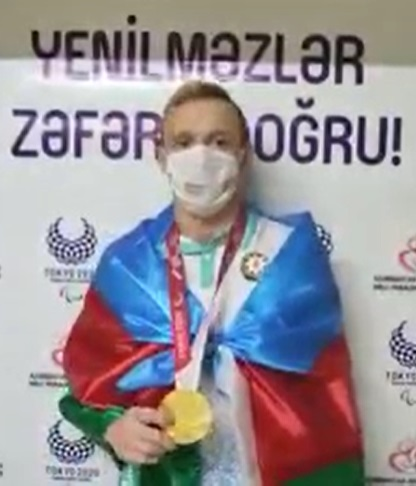
- Raman Salei (Azerbaijan) with his gold medal
- Venue: Tokyo Aquatics Centre
- Dates: 27 August 2021
- Competitors: 8 from 7 nations

Medalists
1st place, gold medalist(s)		Raman Salei	Azerbaijan
2nd place, silver medalist(s)		Serhiy Klippert	Ukraine
3rd place, bronze medalist(s)		Stephen Clegg	Great Britain

The Men's 100 metre backstroke S12 event at the 2020 Paralympic Games took place on 27 August 2021, at the Tokyo Aquatics Centre.

== Final ==
100m backstroke final
Rank	Lane	Name	Nationality	Time	Notes
1st place, gold medalist(s)	4	Raman Salei	Azerbaijan	1:00.30	
2nd place, silver medalist(s)	5	Serhiy Klippert	Ukraine	1:00.71	
3rd place, bronze medalist(s)	7	Stephen Clegg	Great Britain	1:01.27	
4	3	Charalampos Taiganidis	Greece	1:02.16	
5	6	Roman Makarov	RPC	1:02.85	
6	2	Artur Saifutdinov	RPC	1:07.36	
7	8	Daniel Giraldo Correa	Colombia	1:08.40	
	7	Maksim Vaskevich	Chile	DNS	
