= Harry Brown (basketball) =

American-Canadian basketball player (1948–2021)

Harry Truman Brown (October 22, 1948 – January 10, 2021) was an American basketball player and educator who promoted the game of basketball in the Toronto area.

== Career ==
Born in Pittsburgh to Cornelius and Emma Brown, Brown was a basketball player at Connelly Tech and the University of Oklahoma (1966–1970). Graduating in 1970 he played professional basketball, trying out with the Detroit Pistons as well as with the Dallas Cowboys of the NFL.

In the early 1970s he moved to Toronto and became a special education teacher with the Scarborough Board of Education/Toronto District School Board. He was a star attraction on Sundays at George Brown College and influence with youth basketball in Toronto and beyond, someone of whom became basketball players and coaches (NBA Canada and Raptors broadcaster Savannah Hamilton, Raptors broadcaster Leo Rautins, Rob Samuels, Norm Clarke, Tony Simms, Simeon Mars, Joe Alexander and Boston Celtics general manager Danny Ainge).

Brown lived in the Toronto suburb of East York, Ontario with wife of 37 years Sue and their daughters Brianna and Hilary.

Brown died in Toronto on January 10, 2021.
