= Ashley Van Rijswijk =

Australian Paralympic swimmer

Ashley van Rijswijk
Personal information
- Nationality: Australian
- Born: 31 August 2000 (age 25)

Sport
- Country: Australia
- Sport: Paralympic swimming
- Disability class: S14, SB14, SM14
- Club: Wagga Wagga Swim Club
- Coached by: Gennadiy Labara

Ashley van Rijswijk (born 31 August 2000) is an Australian Paralympic swimmer with an intellectual disability. She represented Australia at the 2020 Tokyo Paralympics.

== Personal ==
Ashley van Rijswijk is from Tumut, New South Wales and in 2021 is based in Wagga Wagga, New South Wales. She attended Gadara School in Tumut.

== Swimming career ==
van Rijswijk is classified as a S14 swimmer. In October 2019, she was sidelined with a painful neck injury. “I dived into a pool and had muscle and ligament damage in my C3, 4 and 5 but mainly soft tissue damage.” At the 2021 Australian Swimming Trials, she swam 1:17.36 in the 100m breaststroke heats to qualify fastest for the final but ended up runner up with a time of 1:17.73. Despite missing the Tokyo 2021 qualifying time by a mere 11 hundredths of a second, she was selected for the 2020 Tokyo Paralympics.

Her main events are the 100m Breastroke SB14 and the 200m individual medley SM14.

At the 2020 Tokyo Paralympics, van Rijswijk qualified for the Women's 100 m Breaststroke SM14 but only manage fifth place. She swam in the Women's 100 m Breaststroke SM14 but did not advance to the final.

In 2021, she is a Southern Sports Academy scholarship athlete.
