= Stephen Clegg =

British Paralympic swimmer (born 1995)

Stephen Clegg MBE
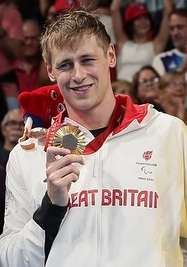
- Clegg at the 2024 Summer Paralympics

Personal information
- Born: 23 November 1995 (age 30) Stockport, Greater Manchester, England

Sport
- Country: Great Britain; Scotland
- Sport: Paralympic swimming
- Coached by: Chris Jones
Medal record
Paralympic swimming
Representing Great Britain
Paralympic Games
Gold medal – first place	2024 Paris	100 m backstroke S12
Gold medal – first place	2024 Paris	100 m butterfly S12
Silver medal – second place	2020 Tokyo	100 m butterfly S12
Bronze medal – third place	2020 Tokyo	100 m backstroke S12
Bronze medal – third place	2020 Tokyo	100 m freestyle S12
World Championships
Gold medal – first place	2022 Madeira	100 m butterfly S12
Gold medal – first place	2023 Manchester	100 m backstroke S12
Silver medal – second place	2022 Madeira	100 m freestyle S12
Silver medal – second place	2023 Manchester	100 m butterfly S12
Silver medal – second place	2023 Manchester	100 m freestyle S12
Representing Scotland
Commonwealth Games
Silver medal – second place	2022 Birmingham	50 m freestyle S13

Stephen Clegg (born 23 November 1995) is a British Paralympic swimmer.

== Early life ==
Clegg was born in Stockport in Greater Manchester, before moving to Newcastleton in the Scottish Borders. He attended the Royal Blind School in Edinburgh.

== Career ==
He won bronze in the Men's 100 metre backstroke S12 and Men’s 100 metre freestyle in 2020, in which he broke the British record with a time of 53.43.

At the 2024 Summer Paralympics, Clegg won his first Paralympic gold medal in the Men's S12 100m backstroke. On 7 September 2024 he won his second gold of the Paralympics in the Mens S12 100m butterfly final.

Clegg was appointed Member of the Order of the British Empire (MBE) in the 2025 New Year Honours for services to swimming.

== Personal life ==
He is the brother of fellow para-swimmer James Clegg and para-athlete Libby Clegg.
