= Crystal Lane =

British Paralympic cyclist

Crystal Lane-Wright
Personal information
- Nationality: British
- Born: Crystal Lane; 13 September 1985 (age 41) Chelmsford, England

Sport
- Country: Great Britain
- Sport: Cycling
- Events: C5 Track pursuit C5 Time trial C4-5 Road race
Medal record
Women's Para-cycling
Representing Great Britain
Summer Paralympics
Silver medal – second place	2016 Rio	Ind. pursuit - C5
Silver medal – second place	2020 Tokyo	Ind. pursuit - C5
Silver medal – second place	2020 Tokyo	Road time trial - C5
Silver medal – second place	2020 Tokyo	Road Race C4–5
Bronze medal – third place	2016 Rio	Road race - C4-5
Road World Championships
Bronze medal – third place	2011 Roskilde	Road race - C5
Bronze medal – third place	2017 Pietermaritzburg	Road race - C5
Silver medal – second place	2018 Maniago	Time trial - C5
Bronze medal – third place	2018 Maniago	Road race - C5
Silver medal – second place	2021 Cascais	Time trial - C5
Track World Championships
Gold medal – first place	2018 Rio de Janeiro	3km Pursuit C5
Silver medal – second place	2015 Apeldoorn	500m time trial C5
Silver medal – second place	2019 Apeldoorn	Scratch race C5
Silver medal – second place	2020 Milton	Scratch Race C5
Silver medal – second place	2020 Milton	Individual Pursuit C5
Silver medal – second place	2022 Saint-Quentin-en-Yvelines	Scratch race C5
Bronze medal – third place	2015 Apeldoorn	Scratch race C4-5
Bronze medal – third place	2016 Montichiari	500m time trial C5
Bronze medal – third place	2026 Apeldoorn	Scratch race C5

Crystal Lane-Wright (née Lane; born 13 September 1985) is a British Paralympic track and road cyclist competing in C5 events. A bronze medallist in the Road World Championships in 2011, she competed for Great Britain team at the 2012 Summer Paralympics and 2016 Summer Paralympics. At the 2016 Games in Rio she took silver medal in the individual pursuit and bronze in the road race. In 2018, she won the individual pursuit at the Rio de Janeiro Track World Championships. The same year she also took silver in individual time trial and bronze in the road race in the Road World Championships held in Maniago.

== Personal history ==
Lane-Wright was born with an under-developed left arm and took up sport as a youth and was active in football, playing at county level. In 2008, she watched Sarah Storey compete at the 2008 Summer Paralympics in Beijing. She noticed that she had a similar disability to Storey and realised that she could classify as a Paralympic athlete. After a 2009 Great Britain campaign to find athletes for the 2012 Summer Paralympics, Lane-Wright applied and was accepted for trials. By December 2010 she was part of a three athletes selected as part of the GB Para-Cycling Team for 2011.

Lane-Wright made her international debut in 2011 competing in the Road World Championships in Roskilde, Denmark. She finished 9th in the C5 Time Trial and took the bronze medal in the C5 road race, the gold going to GB team mate Sarah Storey. In 2012 Lane-Wright entered the UCI World Cup in Rome. There she finished 4th in the Road Race and 5th in the Time Trial. Lane-Wright qualified for the 2012 Summer Paralympics in all three of her specialised events, C5 track pursuit, C5 time trial and C4-5 road race.

Lane-Wright was part of the UK cycling team at the postponed 2020 Summer Paralympics.

Outside cycling Lane-Wright was a student Loughborough University, studying for an MSc in Sport Nutrition. Crystal graduated from the University of Exeter with a 2:1 in Exercise and Sports Science in 2011.
