= Kerstin Brachtendorf =

German para-cyclist

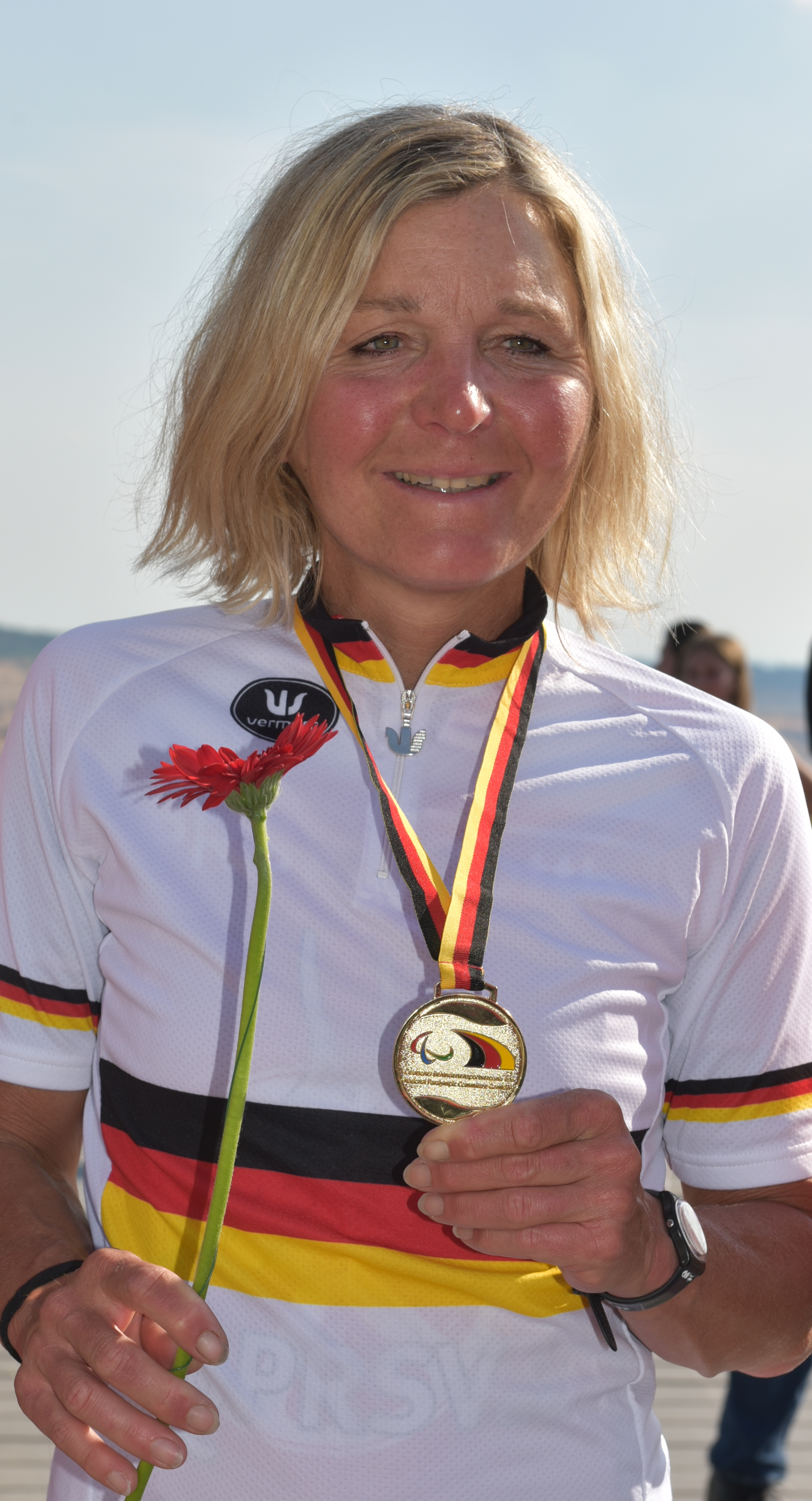
- Brachtendorf in 2022

Personal information
- Nationality: German
- Born: 22 May 1971 (age 55) Mendig, Germany

Sport
- Sport: Para-cycling
- Disability class: C5
Medal record
Women's Para-cycling
Representing Germany
Paralympic Games
Bronze medal – third place	2020 Tokyo	Road time trial C5
Road World Championships
Gold medal – first place	2017 Pietermaritzburg	Road race C5
Gold medal – first place	2022 Baie-Comeau	Road time trial C5
Silver medal – second place	2021 Cascais	Road race C5
Silver medal – second place	2022 Baie-Comeau	Road race C5
Bronze medal – third place	2015 Nottwil	Road time trial C5
Bronze medal – third place	2015 Nottwil	Road race C5
Bronze medal – third place	2017 Pietermaritzburg	Road time trial C5
Bronze medal – third place	2021 Cascais	Road race C5
Bronze medal – third place	2024 Zurich	Road time trial C5
European Championships
Silver medal – second place	2023 Rotterdam	Time trial C5
Bronze medal – third place	2023 Rotterdam	Road race C5

Kerstin Brachtendorf (born 22 May 1972) is a German Para-cyclist who represented Germany in the Paralympics Games.

== Career ==
Brachtendorf represented Germany in the women's road time trial C5 event at the 2020 Summer Paralympics and won a bronze medal.
