= Suzanna Hext =

British swimmer and equestrian

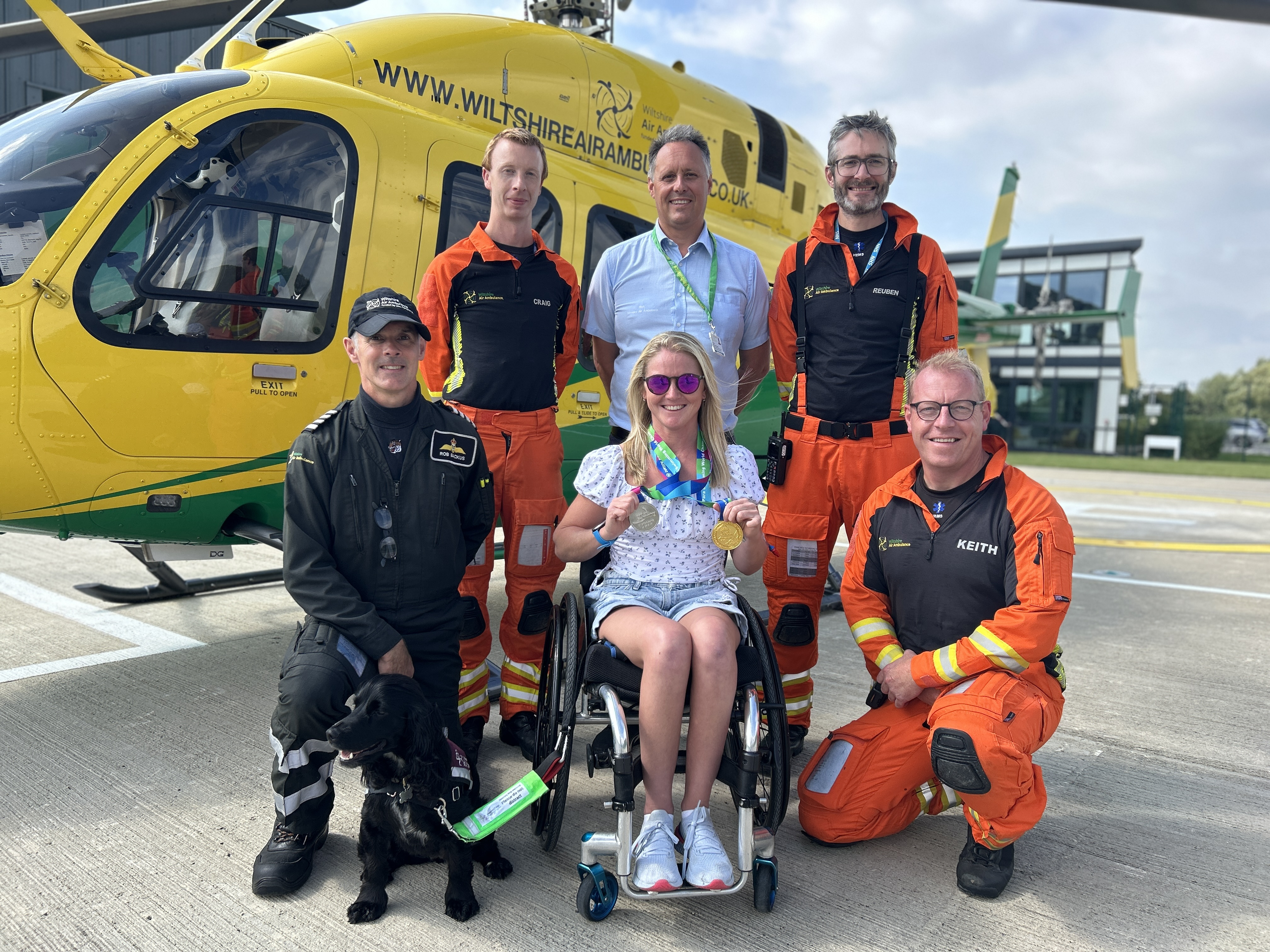
- Hext with Wiltshire Air Ambulance helicopter and crew at their airbase in Semington

Personal information
- Born: 11 September 1988 (age 37) Truro, Cornwall, England

Sport
- Country: United Kingdom
- Sport: Swimming; Equestrian
- Disability class: S5, SB4 (swimming); Grade III (equestrian)
- Event(s): Freestyle, backstroke, breaststroke (swimming); Dressage (equestrian)

Achievements and titles
- Paralympic finals: 2020 (swimming)
- World finals: 2019 (swimming)
- Regional finals: 2017 (equestrian)
Medal record
Representing Great Britain
Para swimming
World Championships
Gold medal – first place	2023 Manchester	50m freestyle S5
Silver medal – second place	2019 London	50m freestyle S5
Silver medal – second place	2023 Manchester	100m freestyle S5
Bronze medal – third place	2019 London	100m freestyle S5
Equestrian
FEI European Championships
Gold medal – first place	2017 Gothenburg	Grade III Championship
Gold medal – first place	2017 Gothenburg	Grade III Freestyle
Gold medal – first place	2017 Gothenburg	Mixed Team

Suzanna Hext (born 11 September 1988) is a British Paralympic swimmer and equestrian, who won three gold medals in dressage at the 2017 FEI European Championships, and two medals at both the 2019 and 2023 World Para Swimming Championships. She finished fourth in two S5 swimming events at the 2020 Summer Paralympics.

== Personal life ==
Hext is from Truro, Cornwall. and has also lived near Sherston, Wiltshire. In 2012, she was paralysed in a horse riding accident, and required the use of a wheelchair. She watched the 2012 Summer Paralympics from her hospital bed. In November 2021, she had a cochlear implant.

Hext is an ambassador of Wiltshire and Bath Air Ambulance Charity, the service that airlifted her to a hospital following a horse riding accident in 2012.

== Equestrian career ==
In equestrian, Hext competes in the Grade III classification. She won three gold medals in dressage at the 2017 FEI European Championships, winning the individual, team and freestyle events. She competed in the team event alongside Sophie Wells, Erin Orford and Julie Payne, and it was her first European Championship. In 2018, she was part of the British team that won the team event at the Pole International du Cheval.

== Swimming career ==
Hext started swimming in 2017, and has trained at Swindon swimming club, and at the Manchester Aquatics Centre. As of 2024, Hext trained at the University of Bath. Hext is the British record holder in S5 50 metre and 100 metre freestyle events, and in S4 100 metre backstroke.

At the 2019 World Para Swimming Championships, Hext came second in the 50 metre freestyle event, and third in the 100 metre freestyle competition. In 2020, she decided to participate in swimming qualifying for the 2020 Summer Paralympics, rather than equestrian. During the COVID-19 pandemic, she turned her parents' house into a gym, and was able to use jockey AP McCoy's private pool, as well as swimming in the Cornish sea.

At the 2020 Summer Paralympics, Hext had an asthma attack that caused her to be hospitalised. As a result, she was withdrawn from the British team for the mixed 4 × 50 metre freestyle relay 20pts. She came fourth in the finals of the 200 metre freestyle S5 and 100 metre freestyle S5 events. After further asthma attacks, Hext withdrew from the 100m breaststroke SB4 and 50m backstroke S5 events.

Hext did not compete at the 2022 World Para Swimming Championships after developing sepsis whilst training in Lanzarote, Canary Islands. She was included in the British squad for the 2023 World Para Swimming Championships. She won the 50 metre freestyle S5 event at the World Championships, and finished second in the 100 metre freestyle S5 competition.

Hext was selected for the 2024 Summer Paralympics in Paris. A few days before her first event, Hext withdrew from the Paralympics for medical reasons.
