= Louise Fiddes =

British Paralympic swimmer

Personal information
- Born: 26 March 2001 (age 25) Barnet, England, Great Britain

Sport
- Country: Great Britain
- Sport: Paralympic swimming
- Disability class: S14, SB14, SM14
- Club: Hatfield Swimming Club
- Coached by: Janko Gojkovic
Medal record
Paralympic swimming
Representing Great Britain
Paralympic Games
Gold medal – first place	2024 Paris	100 m breaststroke SB14
Silver medal – second place	2020 Tokyo	100m breaststroke SB14
Bronze medal – third place	2020 Tokyo	200m ind. medley SM14
Bronze medal – third place	2024 Paris	200 m freestyle S14
World Championships
Gold medal – first place	2019 London	100m breaststroke SB14
Bronze medal – third place	2019 London	200m individual medley
Bronze medal – third place	2022 Madeira	200m freestyle S14
Bronze medal – third place	2022 Madeira	200m ind. medley SM14
Bronze medal – third place	2023 Manchester	200m freestyle S14
Bronze medal – third place	2025 Singapore	200 m freestyle S14
European Championships
Gold medal – first place	2018 Dublin	100m breaststroke SB14
Bronze medal – third place	2018 Dublin	100m butterfly S14
Bronze medal – third place	2018 Dublin	200m ind. medley SM14
Representing England
Commonwealth Games
Bronze medal – third place	2022 Birmingham	200m freestyle S14

Louise Fiddes (born 26 March 2001) is a British Paralympic swimmer who competes in international level events. She is a world and European champion in breaststroke events. She grew up in Welwyn Garden City and trained at Hatfield Swimming Club.

At the 2024 Summer Paralympics she won a bronze medal in the 200m freestyle S14. Poppy Maskill took the silver and they were both beaten by Valeriia Shabalina.
