= Valeriia Shabalina =

Russian Paralympic swimmer

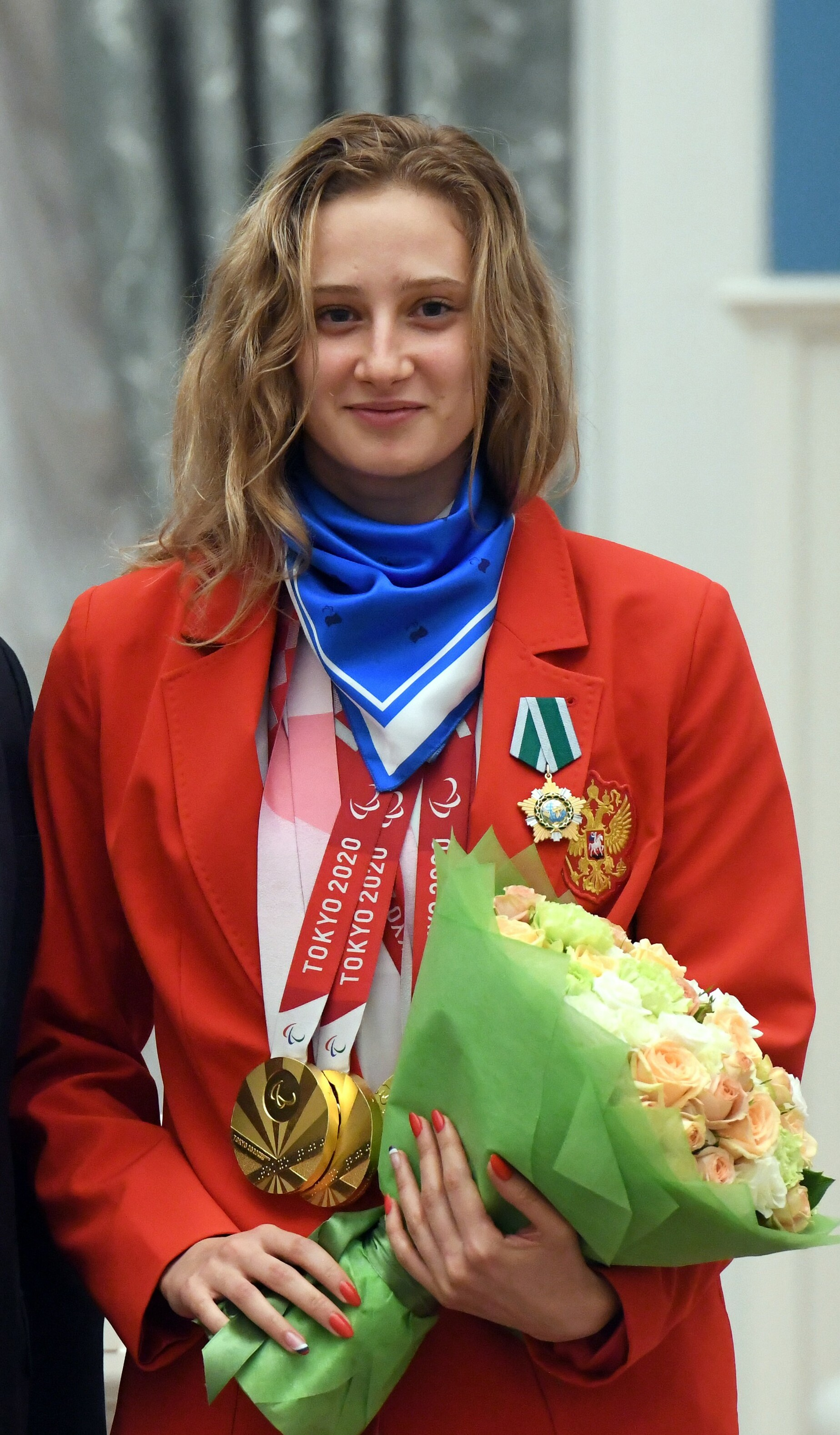
- Shabalina in 2021

Personal information
- Nickname: Lera
- Born: 9 June 1995 (age 31) Chelyabinsk, Russia
- Height: 1.74 m (5 ft 9 in)

Sport
- Country: Russia
- Sport: Paralympic swimming
- Disability class: S14, SB14, SM14
- Club: Chelyabinsk Olympic Sports School No. 7
- Coached by: Tatiana Novikova
Medal record
Paralympic swimming
Representing Neutral Paralympic Athletes
| Gold medal – first place | 2024 Paris | 200 m freestyle S14 |
| Gold medal – first place | 2024 Paris | 200 m ind. medley SM14 |
| Silver medal – second place | 2024 Paris | 100 m backstroke S14 |
| Bronze medal – third place | 2024 Paris | 100 m butterfly S14 |
World Championships
| Gold medal – first place | 2025 Singapore | 200 m ind. medley SM14 |
| Silver medal – second place | 2025 Singapore | 200 m freestyle S14 |
| Bronze medal – third place | 2025 Singapore | 100 m butterfly S14 |
Representing RPC
Paralympic Games
| Gold medal – first place | 2020 Tokyo | 100 m butterfly S14 |
| Gold medal – first place | 2020 Tokyo | 200 m freestyle S14 |
| Gold medal – first place | 2020 Tokyo | 200 m ind. medley S14 |
| Silver medal – second place | 2020 Tokyo | 100 m backstroke S14 |
Representing Russia
INAS Global Games
| Gold medal – first place | 2019 Brisbane | 200m freestyle II1 |
| Gold medal – first place | 2019 Brisbane | 400m freestyle II1 |
| Gold medal – first place | 2019 Brisbane | 800m freestyle II1 |
| Gold medal – first place | 2019 Brisbane | 1500m freestyle II1 |
| Gold medal – first place | 2019 Brisbane | 100m backstroke II1 |
| Gold medal – first place | 2019 Brisbane | 200m backstroke II1 |
| Gold medal – first place | 2019 Brisbane | 100m butterfly II1 |
| Gold medal – first place | 2019 Brisbane | 400m individual medley II1 |
| Gold medal – first place | 2019 Brisbane | 4x100m medley relay II1 |
| Gold medal – first place | 2019 Brisbane | Mixed 4x100m freestyle relay II1 |
| Silver medal – second place | 2019 Brisbane | 4x50m freestyle relay II1 |
| Silver medal – second place | 2019 Brisbane | 4x50m medley relay II1 |
| Silver medal – second place | 2019 Brisbane | 4x200m freestyle relay II1 |
| Bronze medal – third place | 2019 Brisbane | 4x100m freestyle relay II1 |
World Championships
| Gold medal – first place | 2015 Glasgow | 200m freestyle S14 |
| Gold medal – first place | 2015 Glasgow | 200m individual medley SM14 |
| Gold medal – first place | 2019 London | 200m freestyle S14 |
| Gold medal – first place | 2019 London | 100m butterfly S14 |
| Gold medal – first place | 2019 London | 200m individual medley SM14 |
| Silver medal – second place | 2015 Glasgow | 100m backstroke S14 |
| Silver medal – second place | 2015 Glasgow | 100m breaststroke SB14 |
| Silver medal – second place | 2019 London | 100m backstroke S14 |
| Silver medal – second place | 2019 London | 4x100m freestyle relay S14 |
| Bronze medal – third place | 2019 London | 100m breaststroke SB14 |
INAS European Swimming Championships
| Gold medal – first place | 2018 Villejuif | 100m freestyle II1 |
| Gold medal – first place | 2018 Villejuif | 200m freestyle II1 |
| Gold medal – first place | 2018 Villejuif | 400m freestyle II1 |
| Gold medal – first place | 2018 Villejuif | 800m freestyle II1 |
| Gold medal – first place | 2018 Villejuif | 1500m freestyle II1 |
| Gold medal – first place | 2018 Villejuif | 100m backstroke II1 |
| Gold medal – first place | 2018 Villejuif | 100m butterfly II1 |
| Gold medal – first place | 2018 Villejuif | 200m butterfly II1 |
| Gold medal – first place | 2018 Villejuif | 200m individual medley II1 |
| Gold medal – first place | 2018 Villejuif | 400m individual medley II1 |
| Gold medal – first place | 2018 Villejuif | 4x50m freestyle relay II1 |
European Championships
| Gold medal – first place | 2014 Eindhoven | 200m freestyle S14 |
| Gold medal – first place | 2014 Eindhoven | 100m backstroke S14 |
| Gold medal – first place | 2014 Eindhoven | 200m individual medley SM14 |
| Gold medal – first place | 2016 Funchal | 200m freestyle S14 |
| Gold medal – first place | 2016 Funchal | 100m backstroke S14 |
| Gold medal – first place | 2016 Funchal | 200m individual medley SM14 |
| Gold medal – first place | 2026 Kocaeli | 200 m freestyle S14 |
| Silver medal – second place | 2026 Kocaeli | 100 m backstroke S14 |
| Silver medal – second place | 2026 Kocaeli | 100 m butterfly S14 |
| Bronze medal – third place | 2016 Funchal | 100m breaststroke SB14 |
Representing Neutral Paralympic Athletes
European Championships
| Gold medal – first place | 2024 Funchal | 200 m freestyle S14 |
| Gold medal – first place | 2024 Funchal | 100 m backstroke S14 |
| Silver medal – second place | 2024 Funchal | 100 m butterfly S14 |
| Silver medal – second place | 2024 Funchal | 200 m ind. medley SM14 |

Valeria Andreyevna Shabalina (Russian: Валерия Андреевна Шабалина; born 9 June 1995) is a Russian Paralympic swimmer who competes in international level events. She is a three-time Paralympic champion. Furthermore, she has won multiple medals in both World Para Swimming Championships and INAS Global Games. She is a Merited Master of Sports of Russia.

She gained a bronze medal at the 2024 Paralympics when she was beaten by Yui-lam Chan from Hong Kong and gold medallist Poppy Maskill in the S14 100m butterfly. In the same Paralympics she gained a gold medal in the 200m freestyle S14.
