= Angela Marina =

Canadian para swimmer

Personal information
- Born: April 27, 1999 (age 27) Brantford, Ontario, Canada
- Home town: Cambridge, Ontario, Canada
- Height: 180 cm (5 ft 11 in)

Sport
- Country: Canada
- Sport: Para swimming
- Disability class: S14, SB14, SM14
- Club: Brantford Aquatic Club
- Coached by: Paul Armstrong
Medal record
Women's para swimming
Representing Canada
Parapan American Games
Gold medal – first place	2019 Lima	100m butterfly S14
Gold medal – first place	2019 Lima	200m freestyle S14
Silver medal – second place	2019 Lima	100m backstroke S14

Angela Marina (born April 27, 1999) is a Canadian para swimmer who competes in international level events.
