= Swimming at the 2016 Summer Paralympics – Women's 200 metre freestyle =

The women's 200 metre freestyle swimming events for the 2016 Summer Paralympics take place at the Rio Olympic Stadium from 8 to 15 September. A total of two events were contested for two different classifications.

== Competition format ==
Each event consists of two rounds: heats and final. The top eight swimmers overall in the heats progress to the final. If there are eight or fewer swimmers in an event, no heats are held and all swimmers qualify for the final.

== Results ==
=== S5 ===
20:08 8 September 2016:

Rank	Lane	Name	Nationality	Time	Notes
1st place, gold medalist(s)	5	Li Zhang	China	2:48.33	
2nd place, silver medalist(s)	3	Teresa Perales	Spain	2:50.91	
3rd place, bronze medalist(s)	4	Sarah Louise Rung	Norway	2:51.37	
4	2	Cuan Yao	China	3:00.93	
5	6	Inbal Pezaro	Israel	3:03.29	
6	7	Joana Maria Silva	Brazil	3:12.73	
7	8	Alyssa Gialamas	United States	3:15.04	
8	1	Anita Fatis	France	3:18.23	

=== S14 ===
18:37 11 September 2016:

Rank	Lane	Name	Nationality	Time	Notes
1st place, gold medalist(s)	4	Bethany Firth	Great Britain	2:03.30	PR
2nd place, silver medalist(s)	5	Jessica-Jane Applegate	Great Britain	2:06.92	
3rd place, bronze medalist(s)	6	Marlou van der Kulk	Netherlands	2:10.20	
4	3	Pernilla Lindberg	Sweden	2:12.54	
5	2	Michelle Alonso Morales	Spain	2:16.65	
6	8	Xenia Francesca Palazzo	Italy	2:19.21	
7	7	Michelle Franssen	Belgium	2:19.91	
8	1	Janina Breuer	Germany	2:22.16	
