= Swimming at the 2016 Summer Paralympics – Women's 200 metre freestyle S14 =

Women's 200 metre freestyle S14 at the XV Paralympic Games
- Venue: Olympic Aquatics Stadium
- Dates: 11 September 2016
- Competitors: 11 from 10 nations

Medalists
| 1st place, gold medalist(s) | | Bethany Firth | Great Britain |
| 2nd place, silver medalist(s) | | Jessica-Jane Applegate | Great Britain |
| 3rd place, bronze medalist(s) | | Marlou van der Kulk | Netherlands |

The women's 200 metre freestyle S14 event at the 2016 Paralympic Games took place on 11 September 2016, at the Olympic Aquatics Stadium. Two heats were held. The swimmers with the eight fastest times advanced to the final.

== Heats ==
=== Heat 1 ===
10:43 11 September 2016:

| Rank | Lane | Name | Nationality | Time | Notes |
|---|---|---|---|---|---|
| 1 | 4 | Jessica-Jane Applegate | Great Britain | 2:07.95 | PR Q |
| 2 | 5 | Pernilla Lindberg | Sweden | 2:13.74 | Q |
| 3 | 3 | Michelle Franssen | Belgium | 2:20.52 | Q |
| 4 | 6 | Janina Breuer | Germany | 2:21.14 | Q |
| 5 | 2 | Beatriz Carneiro | Brazil | 2:27.11 | |

=== Heat 2 ===
10:48 11 September 2016:

| Rank | Lane | Name | Nationality | Time | Notes |
|---|---|---|---|---|---|
| 1 | 4 | Bethany Firth | Great Britain | 2:05.96 | PR Q |
| 2 | 5 | Marlou van der Kulk | Netherlands | 2:14.63 | Q |
| 3 | 3 | Michelle Alonso Morales | Spain | 2:17.42 | Q |
| 4 | 6 | Xenia Francesca Palazzo | Italy | 2:21.25 | Q |
| 5 | 7 | Syuci Indriani | Indonesia | 2:24.63 | |
| 6 | 2 | Leslie Cichocki | United States | 2:28.64 | |

== Final ==
18:37 11 September 2016:

| Rank | Lane | Name | Nationality | Time | Notes |
|---|---|---|---|---|---|
| 1st place, gold medalist(s) | 4 | Bethany Firth | Great Britain | 2:03.30 | PR |
| 2nd place, silver medalist(s) | 5 | Jessica-Jane Applegate | Great Britain | 2:06.92 | |
| 3rd place, bronze medalist(s) | 6 | Marlou van der Kulk | Netherlands | 2:10.20 | |
| 4 | 3 | Pernilla Lindberg | Sweden | 2:12.54 | |
| 5 | 2 | Michelle Alonso Morales | Spain | 2:16.65 | |
| 6 | 8 | Xenia Francesca Palazzo | Italy | 2:19.21 | |
| 7 | 7 | Michelle Franssen | Belgium | 2:19.91 | |
| 8 | 1 | Janina Breuer | Germany | 2:22.16 | |
