= Swimming at the 2016 Summer Paralympics – Women's 200 metre individual medley SM14 =

Women's 200 metre individual medley SM14 at the XV Paralympic Games
- Venue: Olympic Aquatics Stadium
- Dates: 17 September 2016
- Competitors: 12 from 10 nations

Medalists
1st place, gold medalist(s)		Bethany Firth	Great Britain
2nd place, silver medalist(s)		Jessica-Jane Applegate	Great Britain
3rd place, bronze medalist(s)		Marlou van der Kulk	Netherlands

The women's 200 metre individual medley SM14 event at the 2016 Paralympic Games took place on 17 September 2016, at the Olympic Aquatics Stadium. Two heats were held. The swimmers with the eight fastest times advanced to the final.

== Heats ==
=== Heat 1 ===
11:24 17 September 2016:

Rank	Lane	Name	Nationality	Time	Notes
1	4	Jessica-Jane Applegate	Great Britain	2:30.11	PR Q
2	3	Michelle Franssen	Belgium	2:37.31	Q
3	7	Syuci Indriani	Indonesia	2:38.26	Q
4	5	Magda Toeters	Netherlands	2:38.40	Q
5	6	Janina Breuer	Germany	2:41.69	
6	2	Leslie Cichocki	United States	2:50.87	

=== Heat 2 ===
11:29 17 September 2016:

Rank	Lane	Name	Nationality	Time	Notes
1	4	Bethany Firth	Great Britain	2:23.78	PR Q
2	5	Marlou van der Kulk	Netherlands	2:31.41	Q
3	3	Pernilla Lindberg	Sweden	2:35.26	Q
4	6	Michelle Alonso Morales	Spain	2:39.62	Q
5	2	Xenia Francesca Palazzo	Italy	2:48.04	
6	7	Jung Eun Kang	South Korea	2:48.86	

== Final ==
19:58 17 September 2016:

Rank	Lane	Name	Nationality	Time	Notes
1st place, gold medalist(s)	4	Bethany Firth	Great Britain	2:19.55	PR
2nd place, silver medalist(s)	5	Jessica-Jane Applegate	Great Britain	2:27.58	
3rd place, bronze medalist(s)	3	Marlou van der Kulk	Netherlands	2:29.49	
4	6	Pernilla Lindberg	Sweden	2:36.30	
5	2	Michelle Franssen	Belgium	2:36.54	
6	1	Magda Toeters	Netherlands	2:36.56	
7	7	Syuci Indriani	Indonesia	2:40.64	
8	8	Michelle Alonso Morales	Spain	2:44.87	
