= Swimming at the 2016 Summer Paralympics – Women's 100 metre breaststroke SB14 =

Women's 100 metre breaststroke SB14 at the XV Paralympic Games
- Venue: Olympic Aquatics Stadium
- Dates: 14 September 2016
- Competitors: 11 from 9 nations

Medalists
1st place, gold medalist(s)		Michelle Alonso Morales	Spain
2nd place, silver medalist(s)		Bethany Firth	Great Britain
3rd place, bronze medalist(s)		Magda Toeters	Netherlands

The women's 100 metre breaststroke SB14 event at the 2016 Paralympic Games took place on 14 September 2016, at the Olympic Aquatics Stadium. Two heats were held. The swimmers with the eight fastest times advanced to the final.

== Heats ==
=== Heat 1 ===
10:01 14 September 2016:

Rank	Lane	Name	Nationality	Time	Notes
1	4	Bethany Firth	Great Britain	1:18.19	Q
2	5	Marlou van der Kulk	Netherlands	1:19.75	Q
3	3	Michelle Franssen	Belgium	1:23.17	Q
4	6	Jessica-Jane Applegate	Great Britain	1:26.56	
5	2	Xenia Francesca Palazzo	Italy	1:29.72	

=== Heat 2 ===
10:05 14 September 2016:

Rank	Lane	Name	Nationality	Time	Notes
1	4	Michelle Alonso Morales	Spain	1:13.05	PR Q
2	5	Magda Toeters	Netherlands	1:17.83	Q
3	6	Beatriz Carneiro	Brazil	1:22.31	Q
4	3	Pernilla Lindberg	Sweden	1:23.88	Q
5	7	Syuci Indriani	Indonesia	1:24.07	Q
6	2	Janina Breuer	Germany	1:28.65	

== Final ==
18:13 14 September 2016:

Rank	Lane	Name	Nationality	Time	Notes
1st place, gold medalist(s)	4	Michelle Alonso Morales	Spain	1:12.62	PR
2nd place, silver medalist(s)	3	Bethany Firth	Great Britain	1:12.89	
3rd place, bronze medalist(s)	5	Magda Toeters	Netherlands	1:17.35	
4	6	Marlou van der Kulk	Netherlands	1:20.15	
5	2	Beatriz Carneiro	Brazil	1:21.66	
6	7	Michelle Franssen	Belgium	1:22.73	
7	1	Pernilla Lindberg	Sweden	1:23.42	
8	8	Syuci Indriani	Indonesia	1:24.24	
