= Swimming at the 2016 Summer Paralympics – Women's 100 metre backstroke S14 =

Women's 100 metre backstroke S14 at the XV Paralympic Games
- Venue: Olympic Aquatics Stadium
- Dates: 8 September 2016
- Competitors: 9 from 8 nations

Medalists
1st place, gold medalist(s)		Bethany Firth	Great Britain
2nd place, silver medalist(s)		Marlou van der Kulk	Netherlands
3rd place, bronze medalist(s)		Jessica-Jane Applegate	Great Britain

The women's 100 metre backstroke S14 event at the 2016 Paralympic Games took place on 8 September, at the Olympic Aquatics Stadium. Two heats were held, the first with four swimmer and the second with five swimmers. The swimmers with the eight fastest times advanced to the final.

== Records ==
Prior to the competition, the existing World and Paralympic records were as follows.

World record	Bethany Firth (GBR)	1:04.70	Glasgow, Great Britain	28 March 2015
Paralympic record	Bethany Firth (IRL)	1:08.93	London, Great Britain	31 August 2012
2016 World leading	Bethany Firth (GBR)	1:04.73	Sheffield, Great Britain	27 July 2016

== Heats ==
=== Heat 1 ===
Rank	Lane	Name	Nationality	Time	Notes
1	4	Marlou van der Kulk	Netherlands	1:07.23	Q
2	3	Pernilla Lindberg	Sweden	1:15.54	Q
3	5	Janina Breuer	Germany	1:16.26	Q
4	6	Michelle Alonso Morales	Spain	1:19.05	

=== Heat 2 ===
Rank	Lane	Name	Nationality	Time	Notes
1	4	Bethany Firth	Great Britain	1:04.53	Q, WR
2	5	Jessica-Jane Applegate	Great Britain	1:08.41	Q
3	6	Kang Jung Eun	South Korea	1:14.14	Q
4	3	Leslie Cichocki	United States	1:16.80	Q
5	2	Xenia Palazzo	Italy	1:18.26	Q

== Final ==
Rank	Lane	Name	Nationality	Time	Notes
1st place, gold medalist(s)	4	Bethany Firth	Great Britain	1:04.05	WR
2nd place, silver medalist(s)	5	Marlou van der Kulk	Netherlands	1:06.33	
3rd place, bronze medalist(s)	3	Jessica-Jane Applegate	Great Britain	1:08.67	
4	6	Kang Jung Eun	South Korea	1:13.95	
5	2	Pernilla Lindberg	Sweden	1:15.40	
6	7	Janina Breuer	Germany	1:16.02	
7	1	Leslie Cichocki	United States	1:16.76	
8	8	Xenia Palazzo	Italy	1:17.64	
