= 2018 World Para Swimming European Championships – Women's 200 metres freestyle =

The women's 200 metres freestyle at the 2018 World Para Swimming European Championships was held at the National Aquatic Centre in Dublin from 13 – 19 August. 2 classification finals are held in all over this event.

== Medalists ==
Event	Gold		Silver		Bronze	
S5	Inbal Pezaro (ISR)	2:54.91	Monica Boggioni (ITA)	2:55.24	Arjola Trimi (ITA)	3:12.62
S14	Bethany Firth (GBR)	2:05.41	Jessica-Jane Applegate (GBR)	2:07.29	Louise Fiddes (GBR)	2:09.26
WR world record | AR area record | CR championship record | GR games record | NR national record | OR Olympic record | PB personal best | SB season best | WL world leading (in a given season)

== See also ==
- List of IPC world records in swimming
