= Swimming at the 2020 Summer Paralympics – Women's 100 metre backstroke S14 =

Women's 100 metre backstroke S14 at the XVI Paralympic Games
- Venue: Tokyo Aquatics Centre
- Dates: 2 September 2021
- Competitors: 14 from 10 nations

Medalists
1st place, gold medalist(s)		Bethany Firth	Great Britain
2nd place, silver medalist(s)		Valeriia Shabalina	RPC
3rd place, bronze medalist(s)		Jessica-Jane Applegate	Great Britain

The Women's 100 metre backstroke S14 event at the 2020 Paralympic Games took place on 2 September 2021, at the Tokyo Aquatics Centre.

== Heats ==
The swimmers with the top eight times, regardless of heat, advanced to the final.

Rank	Heat	Lane	Name	Nationality	Time	Notes
1	2	4	Bethany Firth	Great Britain	1:07.16	Q
2	2	5	Jessica-Jane Applegate	Great Britain	1:08.41	Q
3	1	4	Valeriia Shabalina	RPC	1:08.64	Q
4	1	5	Madeleine McTernan	Australia	1:09.65	Q
5	2	3	Ana Karolina Soares	Brazil	1:11.67	Q
6	1	3	Chan Yui-lam	Hong Kong	1:12.57	Q
7	2	2	Ruby Storm	Australia	1:12.71	Q
8	2	6	Kasumi Fukui	Japan	1:13.12	Q
9	1	7	Pernilla Lindberg	Sweden	1:14.71	
10	1	6	Angela Marina	Canada	1:14.82	
11	1	2	Kang Jung-eun	South Korea	1:15.86	
12	2	1	Mikika Serizawa	Japan	1:16.93	
13	2	7	Olga Poteshkina	RPC	1:17.00	
14	1	1	Janina Falk	Austria	1:19.44	

== Final ==
Rank	Lane	Name	Nationality	Time	Notes
1st place, gold medalist(s)	4	Bethany Firth	Great Britain	1:05.92	
2nd place, silver medalist(s)	3	Valeriia Shabalina	RPC	1:06.85	
3rd place, bronze medalist(s)	5	Jessica-Jane Applegate	Great Britain	1:07.93	
4	6	Madeleine McTernan	Australia	1:09.82	
5	2	Ana Karolina Soares	Brazil	1:11.29	
6	7	Chan Yui-lam	Hong Kong	1:12.49	
7	8	Kasumi Fukui	Japan	1:12.58	
8	1	Ruby Storm	Australia	1:15.38	
