= Great Britain at the 2016 Summer Paralympics =

- Flag of the United Kingdom
- IPC code: GBR
- NPC: British Paralympic Association
- Website: www.paralympics.org.uk

in Rio de Janeiro
- Competitors: 265 in 19 sports
- Flag bearer (opening): Lee Pearson CBE
- Flag bearer (closing): Kadeena Cox
- Medals Ranked 2nd: Gold 64 Silver 39 Bronze 44 Total 147

Summer Paralympics appearances (overview)
- 1960; 1964; 1968; 1972; 1976; 1980; 1984; 1988; 1992; 1996; 2000; 2004; 2008; 2012; 2016; 2020; 2024

Great Britain and Northern Ireland competed, under the name Great Britain, at the 2016 Summer Paralympics in Rio de Janeiro, Brazil, from 7 September to 18 September 2016. The first places for which the team qualified were for six athletes in sailing events.

== Administration ==
On 19 November 2014, the British Paralympic Association announced the appointment of Penny Briscoe as chef-de-mission to the British Paralympic team at Rio 2016. The Association's President Tim Reddish OBE was Head of Delegation, while CEO Tim Hollingsworth was Secretary General. On 3 August 2015, the BPA announced that Anna Scott-Marshall would replace Jane Jones as Deputy Secretary General of the British delegation.

- Tim Reddish OBE – Head of Delegation
- Penny Briscoe – Chef de Mission
- David Courell – Deputy Chef de Mission
- Georgina Sharples – Deputy Chef de Mission
- Tim Hollingsworth – Secretary General
- Anna Scott-Marshall – Deputy Secretary General
- Dr Stuart Miller – Chief Medical Officer
- Tash Carpenter – Chief Press Officer

== Funding ==
As with previous Games UK Sport was the body responsible for allocating elite funding for Paralympic sports. In December 2012 a record £347 million of funding for Olympic and Paralympic athletes was announced with the aim of becoming the first nation in recent history to win more medals at the Games following being the host nation.

Three sports, wheelchair fencing, goalball and five-a-side football, had all their funding withdrawn, a decision that was confirmed following an appeal process. On the 5 February 2015, UK Sport announced that funding would be restored to wheelchair fencing for the Rio cycle.

== Medal and performance targets ==
UK Sport targeted at least 121 medals for Rio to surpass the 120 medals won at the 2012 Games in London, setting the target range as 113-165 medals. The GB squad surpassed this target on 16 September and finished with a total of 147 medals, which was their best medal haul since the 1988 Summer Paralympics in Seoul, South Korea. The team won medals in 15 sports, and won gold across 11 sports, which eclipsed even China who medalled in 13 sports and topped the podium in 9 sports. It was only the second time that a country had won gold medals across so many sports matching the achievement of China in 2008.

Key	✗ Target missed	✓ Target met	✓ ✓ Target exceeded

Sport	Medals target set	Medals or result	Target missed, met, or exceeded
Archery	3-6	6	✓
Athletics	28-34	33	✓
Boccia	2–5	1	✗
Cycling	16–22	21	✓
Equestrian	8-11	11	✓
Football 7-a-side	0	0	✓
Judo	2–4	0	✗
Para-Canoe	2–3	5	✓ ✓
Para-Triathlon	3-7	4	✓
Powerlifting	1-3	2	✓
Rowing	2–3	4	✓ ✓
Sailing	2–3	2	✓
Shooting	2-5	0	✗
Swimming	35-45	47	✓ ✓
Table Tennis	4–6	3	✗
Wheelchair Basketball	0–2	1	✓
Wheelchair Fencing	1-2	1	✓
Wheelchair Rugby	0-1	0	✓
Wheelchair Tennis	2–3	6	✓ ✓
Total	113-165	147	✓

== Competitors ==
Dame Sarah Storey DBE, the track and road cyclist, and Wheelchair Basketball player Simon Munn participated at their seventh Paralympic Games. Storey celebrated this achievement by becoming Great Britain's most successful female paralympian.

The youngest athlete on the team was thirteen-year-old swimmer Abby Kane. Anne Dunham MBE was the oldest member of the team at 67, bringing four Games worth of experience to a team of equestrian riders. Both athletes won medals during 11 days of competition.

The following is the list of number of competitors in the Games. Note that guides in Athletics and Para-Triathlon, competition partners in Boccia, and pilots in Cycling are counted as athletes:

Sport	Men	Women	Total
Archery	6	5	11
Athletics	29	26	55
Boccia	9	5	14
Cycling	10	10	20
Equestrian	1	4	5
Football 7-a-side	14	0	14
Judo	4	1	5
Paracanoeing	3	3	6
Paratriathlon	6	7	13
Powerlifting	2	2	4
Rowing	5	4	9
Sailing	3	3	6
Shooting	8	3	11
Swimming	15	15	30
Table Tennis	10	3	13
Wheelchair Basketball	12	12	24
Wheelchair Fencing	2	1	3
Wheelchair Rugby	11	1	12
Wheelchair Tennis	7	3	10
Total	157	108	265

== Disability classifications ==
Every participant at the Paralympics has their disability grouped into one of five disability categories; amputation, the condition may be congenital or sustained through injury or illness; cerebral palsy; wheelchair athletes, there is often overlap between this and other categories; visual impairment, including blindness; Les autres, any physical disability that does not fall strictly under one of the other categories, for example dwarfism or multiple sclerosis. Each Paralympic sport then has its own classifications, dependent upon the specific physical demands of competition. Events are given a code, made of numbers and letters, describing the type of event and classification of the athletes competing. Some sports, such as athletics, divide athletes by both the category and severity of their disabilities, other sports, for example swimming, group competitors from different categories together, the only separation being based on the severity of the disability.

== Medallists ==
The following British competitors won medals at the Games. In the 'by discipline' sections below, medallists' names are in bold.

Medal	Name	Sport	Event	Date
Gold	Megan Giglia	Cycling	Women's individual pursuit C3	8 September
Gold	Sarah Storey	Cycling	Women's individual pursuit C5	8 September
Gold	Stephen Bate (Adam Duggleby – pilot)	Cycling	Men's individual pursuit B	8 September
Gold	Oliver Hynd	Swimming	Men's 400 m freestyle S8	8 September
Gold	Bethany Firth	Swimming	Women's 100 m backstroke S14	8 September
Gold	Sophie Thornhill (Helen Scott – pilot)	Cycling	Women's individual time trial B	9 September
Gold	Georgina Hermitage	Athletics	Women's 100 metres T37	9 September
Gold	Jody Cundy	Cycling	Men's 1000 metres time trial C4-5	9 September
Gold	Sophie Hahn	Athletics	Women's 100 metres T38	9 September
Gold	Ellie Robinson	Swimming	Women's 50 m butterfly S6	9 September
Gold	Libby Clegg (Chris Clarke – guide)	Athletics	Women's 100 metres T11	9 September
Gold	Jonnie Peacock	Athletics	Men's 100 metres T44	9 September
Gold	Andy Lewis	Para-Triathlon	Men's PT2	10 September
Gold	Hannah Cockroft	Athletics	Women's 100 metres T34	10 September
Gold	Kadeena Cox	Cycling	Women's 500 metres time trial C4-5	10 September
Gold	Rachel Morris	Rowing	Women's single sculls	11 September
Gold	Lauren Rowles; Laurence Whiteley	Rowing	Mixed double sculls	11 September
Gold	Grace Clough; Daniel Brown; Pam Relph; James Fox; Oliver James (cox)	Rowing	Mixed coxed four	11 September
Gold	Lora Turnham (Corrine Hall – pilot)	Cycling	Women's individual pursuit B	11 September
Gold	Jon-Allan Butterworth; Jody Cundy; Louis Rolfe	Cycling	Mixed team sprint	11 September
Gold	Bethany Firth	Swimming	Women's 200 m freestyle S14	11 September
Gold	Richard Whitehead	Athletics	Men's 200 metres T42	11 September
Gold	Joanna Butterfield	Athletics	Women's club throw F51	11 September
Gold	Aled Davies	Athletics	Men's shot put F42	12 September
Gold	Will Bayley	Table tennis	Men's individual – Class 7	12 September
Gold	Sascha Kindred	Swimming	Men's 200 metre individual medley SM6	12 September
Gold	Eleanor Simmonds	Swimming	Women's 200 metre individual medley SM6	12 September
Gold	Susie Rodgers	Swimming	Women's 50 metre butterfly S7	12 September
Gold	Georgina Hermitage	Athletics	Women's 400 metres T37	13 September
Gold	Rob Davies	Table tennis	Men's individual – Class 2	13 September
Gold	Hollie Arnold	Athletics	Women's javelin	13 September
Gold	Stephanie Millward	Swimming	Women's 100 m backstroke S8	13 September
Gold	Libby Clegg (Chris Clarke – guide)	Athletics	Women's 200 metres T11	13 September
Gold	Matthew Wylie	Swimming	Men's 50 metre freestyle S9	13 September
Gold	Sarah Storey	Cycling	Women's time trial C5	14 September
Gold	Karen Darke	Cycling	Women's time trial H1-2-3	14 September
Gold	Kadeena Cox	Athletics	Women's 400 metres T38	14 September
Gold	Sophie Wells	Equestrian	Individual championship test – grade IV	14 September
Gold	Stephen Bate (Adam Duggleby – pilot)	Cycling	Men's time trial B	14 September
Gold	Hannah Cockroft	Athletics	Women's 400 metres T34	14 September
Gold	Michael Jones	Swimming	Men's 400 m freestyle S7	14 September
Gold	Hannah Russell	Swimming	Women's 100 m backstroke S12	14 September
Gold	Aaron Moores	Swimming	Men's 100 m breaststroke SB14	14 September
Gold	Jeanette Chippington	Para-Canoe	Women's KL1	15 September
Gold	Emma Wiggs	Para-Canoe	Women's KL2	15 September
Gold	Anne Dickins	Para-Canoe	Women's KL3	15 September
Gold	Natasha Baker	Equestrian	Individual championship test – grade II	15 September
Gold	Sophie Christiansen	Equestrian	Individual championship test – grade Ia	15 September
Gold	Sophie Christiansen; Natasha Baker; Anne Dunham; Sophie Wells	Equestrian	Team	15 September
Gold	Paul Blake	Athletics	Men's 400 metres T36	16 September
Gold	Lee Pearson	Equestrian	Individual freestyle test – grade Ib	16 September
Gold	David Smith	Boccia	Individual BC1	16 September
Gold	Natasha Baker	Equestrian	Individual freestyle test – grade II	16 September
Gold	Sophie Christiansen	Equestrian	Individual freestyle test – grade Ia	16 September
Gold	Gordon Reid	Wheelchair tennis	Men's singles	16 September
Gold	Hannah Cockroft	Athletics	Women's 800 metres T34	16 September
Gold	John Walker	Archery	Men's individual compound W1	16 September
Gold	Claire Cashmore; Stephanie Millward; Stephanie Slater; Alice Tai	Swimming	Women's 4 × 100 metre medley relay 34 pts	16 September
Gold	Jessica Stretton	Archery	Women's individual compound W1	17 September
Gold	Sarah Storey	Cycling	Women's road race C4–5	17 September
Gold	John Walker; Jo Frith	Archery	Team compound W1	17 September
Gold	Oliver Hynd	Swimming	Men's 200 m individual medley SM8	17 September
Gold	Hannah Russell	Swimming	Women's 50 m freestyle S12	17 September
Gold	Bethany Firth	Swimming	Women's 200 m individual medley SM14	17 September
Silver	Crystal Lane	Cycling	Women's individual pursuit C5	8 September
Silver	Harriet Lee	Swimming	Women's 100 m breaststroke SB8	8 September
Silver	Jonathan Fox	Swimming	Men's 100 m backstroke S7	8 September
Silver	Stefanie Reid	Athletics	Women's Long Jump F44	9 September
Silver	Ali Jawad	Powerlifting	Men's −59 kg	9 September
Silver	Stephanie Slater	Swimming	Women's 100 metre butterfly S8	9 September
Silver	Kare Adenegan	Athletics	Women's 100 metres T34	10 September
Silver	Toby Gold	Athletics	Men's 100 metres T33	10 September
Silver	Lauren Steadman	Para-Triathlon	Women's PT4	11 September
Silver	Neil Fachie (Peter Mitchell – pilot)	Cycling	Men's 1000 m time trial B	11 September
Silver	Alison Patrick (Hazel Smith – guide)	Para-Triathlon	Women's PT5	11 September
Silver	Rebecca Redfern	Swimming	Women's 100 metre breaststroke SB13	11 September
Silver	Thomas Hamer	Swimming	Men's 200 metre freestyle S14	11 September
Silver	Jessica-Jane Applegate	Swimming	Women's 200 m freestyle S14	11 September
Silver	Jodie Grinham; John Stubbs	Archery	Team compound open	12 September
Silver	Jonathan Broom-Edwards	Athletics	Men's high jump T44	12 September
Silver	Piers Gilliver	Wheelchair fencing	Men's Individual Épée – Category A	13 September
Silver	Oliver Hynd	Swimming	Men's 100 m backstroke S8	13 September
Silver	Lee Pearson	Equestrian	Individual championship test grade Ib	14 September
Silver	Jonathan Fox	Swimming	Men's 400 m freestyle S7	14 September
Silver	Andy Lapthorne	Wheelchair tennis	Quad singles	14 September
Silver	Bethany Firth	Swimming	Women's 100 m backstroke S14	14 September
Silver	Scott Quin	Swimming	Men's 100 m breaststroke SB14	14 September
Silver	Claire Cashmore	Swimming	Women's 100 m breaststroke SB8	14 September
Silver	Anne Dunham	Equestrian	Individual championship test – grade Ia	15 September
Silver	Richard Whitehead	Athletics	Men's 100 metres T42	15 September
Silver	Gordon Reid; Alfie Hewett	Wheelchair tennis	Men's doubles	15 September
Silver	Kadeena Cox; Maria Lyle; Georgina Hermitage; Sophie Hahn	Athletics	Women's 4 × 100 metres T35–38	15 September
Silver	Sophie Wells	Equestrian	Individual freestyle test – grade IV	16 September
Silver	Anne Dunham	Equestrian	Individual freestyle test – grade II	16 September
Silver	David Stone	Cycling	Men's road race T1–2	16 September
Silver	Alfie Hewett	Wheelchair tennis	Men's singles	16 September
Silver	Andrew Mullen	Swimming	Men's 50 m backstroke S5	16 September
Silver	Jo Frith	Archery	Women's individual compound W1	17 September
Silver	Stephanie Millward	Swimming	Women's 200 m individual medley SM8	17 September
Silver	Abby Kane	Swimming	Women's 100 metre backstroke S13	17 September
Silver	Paul Blake	Athletics	Men's 800 metres T36	17 September
Silver	Thomas Hamer	Swimming	Men's 200 m individual medley SM14	17 September
Silver	Jessica-Jane Applegate	Swimming	Women's 200 m individual medley SM14	17 September
Bronze	Stephanie Millward	Swimming	Women's 400 m freestyle S8	8 September
Bronze	Jessica-Jane Applegate	Swimming	Women's 100 m backstroke S14	8 September
Bronze	Andrew Mullen	Swimming	Men's 400 m freestyle S5	8 September
Bronze	Zoe Newson	Powerlifting	Women's 45 kg	9 September
Bronze	Gemma Prescott	Athletics	Club Throw F32	9 September
Bronze	Kadeena Cox	Athletics	Women's 100 metres T38	9 September
Bronze	Susie Rodgers	Swimming	Women's 50 m freestyle S7	9 September
Bronze	Louis Rolfe	Cycling	Men's individual pursuit C3	9 September
Bronze	Lewis White	Swimming	Men's 400 m freestyle S9	9 September
Bronze	Sabrina Fortune	Athletics	Women's shot put F20	10 September
Bronze	Andrew Small	Athletics	Men's 100 metres T33	10 September
Bronze	Alice Tai	Swimming	Women's 100 m backstroke S10	10 September
Bronze	Tom Aggar	Rowing	Men's single sculls	11 September
Bronze	Sophie Thornhill (Helen Scott – pilot)	Cycling	Women's individual pursuit B	11 September
Bronze	Melissa Reid (Nicole Walters – guide)	Para-Triathlon	Women's PT5	11 September
Bronze	Amy Marren	Swimming	Women's 200 m individual medley SM9	11 September
Bronze	David Henson	Athletics	Men's 200 metres T42	11 September
Bronze	Josef Craig	Swimming	Men's 100 m freestyle S8	11 September
Bronze	Stephanie Millward	Swimming	Women's 100 m freestyle S8	11 September
Bronze	Stephen Miller	Athletics	Men's Club Throw F32	13 September
Bronze	Jamie Burdekin; Andy Lapthorne	Wheelchair tennis	Quad doubles	13 September
Bronze	Eleanor Simmonds	Swimming	Women's 400 metre freestyle S6	13 September
Bronze	Lucy Shuker; Jordanne Whiley	Wheelchair tennis	Women's doubles	13 September
Bronze	Maria Lyle	Athletics	Women's 100 metre T35	14 September
Bronze	David Stone	Cycling	Men's time trial T1–2	14 September
Bronze	Lora Turnham (Corrine Hall – pilot)	Cycling	Women's time trial B	14 September
Bronze	Kare Adenegan	Athletics	Women's 400 metres T34	14 September
Bronze	Susie Rodgers	Swimming	Women's 400 metre freestyle S7	14 September
Bronze	Ian Marsden	Para-Canoe	Men's KL1	15 September
Bronze	Nick Beighton	Para-Canoe	Men's KL2	15 September
Bronze	Charlotte Henshaw	Swimming	Women's 100 metre breaststroke S6	15 September
Bronze	Will Bayley; Aaron McKibbin; Ross Wilson	Table tennis	Men's team – Class 6–8	16 September
Bronze	Dan Greaves	Athletics	Men's discus F44	16 September
Bronze	Kare Adenegan	Athletics	Women's 800 metres T34	16 September
Bronze	Hannah Russell	Swimming	Women's 100 m freestyle S13	16 September
Bronze	Crystal Lane	Cycling	Women's road race C4–5	17 September
Bronze	Vicky Jenkins	Archery	Women's individual compound W1	17 September
Bronze	Maria Lyle	Athletics	Women's 200 metre T35	17 September
Bronze	Harry Brown; Simon Brown; Terry Bywater – (cc); Gaz Choudhry; Abdi Jama; Gregg Warburton; Lee Manning; Kyle Marsh; Simon Munn; Ade Orogbemi; Phil Pratt; Ian Sagar	Wheelchair basketball	Men's tournament	17 September
Bronze	Helena Lucas	Sailing	One-person keelboat	17 September
Bronze	Alexandra Rickham; Niki Birrell	Sailing	Two-person keelboat	17 September
Bronze	Stephen Bate; Adam Duggleby – (pilot)	Cycling	Men's road race B	17 September
Bronze	Ellie Robinson	Swimming	Women's 100 m freestyle S6	17 September
Bronze	Andrew Mullen	Swimming	Men's 100 m freestyle S5	17 September

=== Medals by sport ===
Medals by sport
**Sport**	Gold medal	Silver medal	Bronze medal	Total
Swimming	16	16	15	47
Athletics	15	7	11	33
Cycling	12	3	6	21
Equestrian	7	4	0	11
Archery	3	2	1	6
Para-Canoe	3	0	2	5
Rowing	3	0	1	4
Table Tennis	2	0	1	3
Wheelchair Tennis	1	3	2	6
Para-Triathlon	1	2	1	4
Boccia	1	0	0	1
Powerlifting	0	1	1	2
Wheelchair Fencing	0	1	0	1
Sailing	0	0	2	2
Wheelchair Basketball	0	0	1	1
Total	64	39	44	147

=== Medals by date ===
Medals by date
**Day**	**Date**	Gold medal	Silver medal	Bronze medal	Total
1	8 Sept	5	3	3	11
2	9 Sept	7	3	6	16
3	10 Sept	3	2	3	8
4	11 Sept	8	6	7	21
5	12 Sept	5	2	0	7
6	13 Sept	6	2	4	12
7	14 Sept	9	6	5	20
8	15 Sept	6	4	3	13
9	16 Sept	9	5	4	18
10	17 Sept	6	6	9	21
11	18 Sept	0	0	0	0
Total		64	39	44	147

=== Medals by gender ===
Medals by gender^{(Comparison graphs)}
**Gender**	Gold medal	Silver medal	Bronze medal	**Total**	**Percentage**
Female	40	19	26	85	57.8%
Male	21	20	17	58	39.5%
Mixed	3	0	1	4	2.7%
Total	64	39	44	147	100%

=== Multiple medallists ===
The following Team GB competitors won several medals at the 2016 Paralympic Games.

Name	Medal	Sport	Event
Bethany Firth	Gold	Swimming	Women's 200 metre freestyle S14
Bethany Firth	Gold	Swimming	Women's 200 metre backstroke S14
Bethany Firth	Gold	Swimming	Women's 200 metre individual medley SM14
Bethany Firth	Silver	Swimming	Women's 100 metre backstroke S14
Sophie Christiansen	Gold	Equestrian	Individual championship test – grade 1a
Sophie Christiansen	Gold	Equestrian	team championship
Sophie Christiansen	Gold	Equestrian	individual freestyle – grade Ia
Natasha Baker	Gold	Equestrian	Individual championship test – grade II
Natasha Baker	Gold	Equestrian	team championship
Natasha Baker	Gold	Equestrian	individual freestyle – grade III
Sarah Storey	Gold	Cycling	Women's individual pursuit C5
Sarah Storey	Gold	Cycling	Women's time trial C5
Sarah Storey	Gold	Cycling	Women's road race C4-5
Hannah Cockroft	Gold	Athletics	Women's 100 metres T34
Hannah Cockroft	Gold	Athletics	Women's 400 metres T34
Hannah Cockroft	Gold	Athletics	Women's 800 metres T34
Stephanie Millward	Gold	Swimming	Women's 100 metre backstroke S8
Stephanie Millward	Gold	Swimming	Women's 4 x 100 metre medley relay 34 pts
Stephanie Millward	Silver	Swimming	Women's 200 metre individual medley SM8
Stephanie Millward	Bronze	Swimming	Women's 100 metre freestyle S8
Stephanie Millward	Bronze	Swimming	Women's 400 metre freestyle S8
Kadeena Cox *	Gold	Cycling	Women's 500m time trial C4-5
Kadeena Cox *	Gold	Athletics	Women's 400m T38
Kadeena Cox *	Silver	Athletics	Women's 4 × 100 metres relay T35–38
Kadeena Cox *	Bronze	Athletics	Women's 100m T38
Sophie Wells	Gold	Equestrian	Individual championship test – grade IV
Sophie Wells	Gold	Equestrian	team championship
Sophie Wells	Silver	Equestrian	individual freestyle – grade IV
Georgina Hermitage	Gold	Athletics	Women's 100 metres T37
Georgina Hermitage	Gold	Athletics	Women's 400 metres T37
Georgina Hermitage	Silver	Athletics	Women's 4 × 100 metres relay T35–38
Oliver Hynd	Gold	Swimming	Men's 400 metre freestyle S8
Oliver Hynd	Gold	Swimming	Men's 200 metre individual medley SM8
Oliver Hynd	Silver	Swimming	Men's 100 metre backstroke S8
Stephen Bate (Adam Duggleby – pilot)	Gold	Cycling	Men's individual time trial B
Stephen Bate (Adam Duggleby – pilot)	Gold	Cycling	Men's time trial B
Stephen Bate (Adam Duggleby – pilot)	Bronze	Cycling	Men's road race B
Hannah Russell	Gold	Swimming	Women's 100 m backstroke S12
Hannah Russell	Gold	Swimming	Women's 50 m freestyle S12
Hannah Russell	Bronze	Swimming	Women's 100 m freestyle S13
Jody Cundy	Gold	Cycling	Men's individual time trial C4-5
Jody Cundy	Gold	Cycling	Men's team sprint
John Walker	Gold	Archery	Men's individual compound W1
John Walker	Gold	Archery	Team compound W1
Libby Clegg (Chris Clarke – guide)	Gold	Athletics	Women's 100 metres T11
Libby Clegg (Chris Clarke – guide)	Gold	Athletics	Women's 200 metres T11
Anne Dunham	Gold	Equestrian	team championship
Anne Dunham	Silver	Equestrian	Individual championship test – grade Ia
Anne Dunham	Silver	Equestrian	Individual freestyle test – grade Ia
Richard Whitehead	Gold	Athletics	Men's 200 T42
Richard Whitehead	Silver	Athletics	Men's 100 T42
Paul Blake	Gold	Athletics	Men's 400 metres T36
Paul Blake	Silver	Athletics	Men's 800 metres T36
Sophie Hahn	Gold	Athletics	Women's 100 metres T38
Sophie Hahn	Silver	Athletics	Women's 4 × 100 metres T35–38
Gordon Reid	Gold	Wheelchair tennis	Men's singles
Gordon Reid	Silver	Wheelchair tennis	Men's doubles
Lee Pearson	Gold	Equestrian	Individual freestyle test – grade Ib
Lee Pearson	Silver	Equestrian	Individual championship test grade Ib
Claire Cashmore	Gold	Swimming	Women's 4 × 100 metre medley relay 34 pts
Claire Cashmore	Silver	Swimming	Women's 100 m breaststroke SB8
Stephanie Slater	Gold	Swimming	Women's 4 × 100 metre medley relay 34 pts
Stephanie Slater	Silver	Swimming	Women's 100 metre butterfly S8
Jo Frith	Gold	Archery	Team compound W1
Jo Frith	Silver	Archery	Women's individual compound W1
Susie Rodgers	Gold	Swimming	Women's 50 metre butterfly S5
Susie Rodgers	Bronze	Swimming	Women's 50 metre freestyle S5
Susie Rodgers	Bronze	Swimming	Women's 400 metre freestyle S5
Louis Rolfe	Gold	Cycling	Men's team sprint
Louis Rolfe	Bronze	Cycling	Men's individual time trial C1-2-3
Will Bayley	Gold	Table tennis	Men's individual – Class 7
Will Bayley	Bronze	Table tennis	Men's team – Class 6–8
Eleanor Simmonds	Gold	Swimming	Women's 200 metre individual medley SM6
Eleanor Simmonds	Bronze	Swimming	Women's 200 metre freestyle S6
Ellie Robinson	Gold	Swimming	Women's 50 m butterfly S6
Ellie Robinson	Bronze	Swimming	Women's 100 m freestyle S6
Alice Tai	Gold	Swimming	Women's 4 × 100 metre medley relay 34 pts
Alice Tai	Bronze	Swimming	Women's 100 m backstroke S10
Sophie Thornhill (Helen Scott – pilot)	Gold	Cycling	Women's individual time trial B
Sophie Thornhill (Helen Scott – pilot)	Bronze	Cycling	Women's individual pursuit B
Lora Turnham (Corrine Hall – pilot)	Gold	Cycling	Women's individual pursuit B
Lora Turnham (Corrine Hall – pilot)	Bronze	Cycling	Women's time trial B
Jessica-Jane Applegate	Silver	Swimming	Women's 200 metre freestyle S14
Jessica-Jane Applegate	Silver	Swimming	Women's 200 metre individual medley SM14
Jessica-Jane Applegate	Bronze	Swimming	Women's 200 metre backstroke S14
Jonathan Fox	Silver	Swimming	Men's 400 metre freestyle S7
Jonathan Fox	Silver	Swimming	Men's 100 metre backstroke S7
Thomas Hamer	Silver	Swimming	Men's 200 metre freestyle S14
Thomas Hamer	Silver	Swimming	Men's 200 m individual medley SM14
Alfie Hewett	Silver	Wheelchair tennis	Men's doubles
Alfie Hewett	Silver	Wheelchair tennis	Men's singles
Kare Adenegan	Silver	Athletics	Women's 100 metres T34
Kare Adenegan	Bronze	Athletics	Women's 400 metres T34
Kare Adenegan	Bronze	Athletics	Women's 800 metres T34
Maria Lyle	Silver	Athletics	Women's 4 × 100 metres T35–38
Maria Lyle	Bronze	Athletics	Women's 100 metre T35
Maria Lyle	Bronze	Athletics	Women's 200 metre T35
Andrew Mullen	Silver	Swimming	Men's 50 m backstroke S5
Andrew Mullen	Bronze	Swimming	Men's 400 m freestyle S5
Andrew Mullen	Bronze	Swimming	Men's 100 m freestyle S5
Andy Lapthorne	Silver	Wheelchair tennis	Quad singles
Andy Lapthorne	Bronze	Wheelchair tennis	Quad doubles
Crystal Lane	Silver	Cycling	Women's individual pursuit C5
Crystal Lane	Bronze	Cycling	Women's road race C5
David Stone	Silver	Cycling	Men's road race T1–2
David Stone	Bronze	Cycling	Men's time trial T1–2

*Kadeena Cox's gold medal in the 500m time trial made her the first Great Britain paralympian to win medals in two different sports in the same Games for 28 years.

== Archery ==
Great Britain earned nine spots for Rio based on their performance at the 2015 World Archery Para Championships. The team earned 3 spots in the compound open event, 2 for men and 1 for a woman, earned 2 spots in the recurve open, 1 man and 1 woman, earned 4 spots in the W1 event, 2 men and 2 woman. The first two spots were earned by Jo Frith and John Walker, with 2004 Paralympian John Cavanagh winning the country's third spot. Jessica Stretton's bronze medal at the event gave the country their fourth spot. John Stubbs MBE and Mel Clarke then earned the country's fifth and sixth spots. Other archers assisting in qualifying spots included Michael Hall, David Phillips and Tania Nadarajah. In April 2016, Nathan MacQueen secured a tenth quota for Great Britain at the Continental Qualifying Tournament held during the 2016 European Para-Archery Championships. On 21 June, the British Paralympic Association announced the names of the ten archers who will represent Team GB in Rio. On 9 July, it was announced that the World Archery Federation had given a bipartite invitation to Vicky Jenkins to compete in the women's compound W1 event.

The qualifiers in the mixed team events are also entitled to compete in the individual events.

Individual

Athlete	Event	Ranking round		Round of 32	Round of 16	Quarterfinals	Semifinals	Final / BM	
Athlete	Event	Score	Seed	Opposition Score	Opposition Score	Opposition Score	Opposition Score	Opposition Score	Rank
Michael Hall	Men's individual compound open	662	18	Imboden (SUI); W 141–139	Polish (USA); W 139–133	Simonelli (ITA); L 136–143	Did not advance		
Nathan MacQueen	Men's individual compound open	681	5	Anderson (RSA); W 144–129	Shelby (USA); L 133–138	Did not advance			
John Stubbs MBE	Men's individual compound open	676	8	Chailinfa (THA); W 139–135	Milne (AUS); L 129–137	Did not advance			
Jodie Grinham	Women's individual compound open	643	10	Bye	Sarti (ITA); W 133–132	Abbaspour (IRI); L 136–137	Did not advance		
David Phillips	Men's individual recurve open	595	16	Cordeiro (BRA); W 6–2	Ranjbarkivaj (IRI); L 4–6	Did not advance			
Tania Nadarajah	Women's individual recurve open	567	16	Buyanjargal (MGL); L 2–6	Did not advance				
John Cavanagh	Men's individual compound W1	608	9	—N/a	Herter (GER); L 124–130	Did not advance			
John Walker	Men's individual compound W1	634	5	—N/a	Antonios (FIN); W 131–123	Yenier (TUR); W 131–128	Herter (GER); W 135–131	Drahoninsky (CZE); W 141–139	1st place, gold medalist(s)
Jo Frith	Women's individual compound W1	631	2	—N/a	Bye	Coryell (USA); W 134–115	Kim (KOR); W 131–123	Stretton (GBR); L 124–137	2nd place, silver medalist(s)
Vicky Jenkins	Women's individual compound W1	582	5	—N/a	Bye	Lu (CHN); W 130–128	Stretton (GBR); L 131–141	Kim (KOR); W 125–124	3rd place, bronze medalist(s)
Jessica Stretton	Women's individual compound W1	634	1	—N/a	Bye	Musilova (CZE); W 130–124	Jenkins (GBR); W 141–131 PR	Frith (GBR); W 137–124	1st place, gold medalist(s)

Team

Athlete	Event	Ranking round		Round of 16	Quarterfinals	Semifinals	Final / BM	
Athlete	Event	Score	Seed	Opposition Score	Opposition Score	Opposition Score	Opposition Score	Rank
Jodie Grinham; John Stubbs	Team compound open	1324	5	Bye	Italy (ITA); W 150–149	South Korea (KOR); W 144–143	China (CHN); L 143–151	2nd place, silver medalist(s)
Tania Nadarajah; David Phillips	Team recurve open	1162	8	Chinese Taipei (TPE); W 6–2	Iran (IRI); L 4–5	Did not advance		
Jo Frith; John Walker	Team compound W1	1268	1	—N/a	Bye	Czech Republic (CZE); W 144–128	South Korea (KOR); W 139–129	1st place, gold medalist(s)

== Athletics ==
Great Britain secured a first quota in athletics for Rio when David Weir finished second in his classification at the 2015 IPC Marathon World Championships in London. Another 15 athletes in the following list secured quotas for Great Britain by finishing in the first two places in their events at the 2015 IPC Athletics World Championships (note only one quota may be awarded per athlete). The British Paralympic Association announced the first tranche of thirteen athletes to be selected for Rio on 23 June 2016. Kadeena Cox had secured a second quota for Team GB in the women's T37 100m but has since been reclassified as a T38 athlete. On 26 July, the British Paralympic Association announced the remaining members of the British athletics team to compete in Rio. F55 discus thrower Claire Harvey was forced to withdraw from the team due to injury.

Men
Track

Athlete	Events	Heat		Semifinal		Final	
Athlete	Events	Time	Rank	Time	Rank	Time	Rank
Graeme Ballard	100 m T36	—N/a				12.84	5
Paul Blake	400 m T36	—N/a				54.49 SB	1st place, gold medalist(s)
Paul Blake	800 m T36	—N/a				2:09.65	2nd place, silver medalist(s)
Dan Bramall	100 m T33	—N/a				18.16	4
Mickey Bushell MBE	100 m T53	15.04	2 Q	—N/a		15.09	6
Mickey Bushell MBE	400 m T53	54.02	5	—N/a		Did not advance	
Richard Chiassaro	100 m T54	14.83	3	—N/a		Did not advance	
Richard Chiassaro	400 m T54	46.98	2 Q	—N/a		47.17	4
Richard Chiassaro	800 m T54	1:39.33	5	—N/a		Did not advance	
Toby Gold	100 m T33	—N/a				17.84	2nd place, silver medalist(s)
David Henson MBE	100 m T42	13.23	5	—N/a		Did not advance	
David Henson MBE	200 m T42	25.26	3 Q	—N/a		24.74	3rd place, bronze medalist(s)
Jordan Howe	100 m T35	DSQ		—N/a		Did not advance	
Jordan Howe	200 m T35	27.61	3 Q	—N/a		27.62	7
Moatez Jomni	100 m T53	15.64	4	—N/a		Did not advance	
Moatez Jomni	400 m T53	51.14	4 q	—N/a		51.53	8
Moatez Jomni	800 m T53	1:46.23	6	—N/a		Did not advance	
Rhys Jones	100 m T37	11.77 PB	4 q	—N/a		11.94	6
Simon Lawson	Marathon T54	—N/a				1:32:15	14
Stephen Morris	1500 m T20	—N/a				3:58.69	6
Stephen Osborne	100 m T51	—N/a				23.18	6
Stephen Osborne	400 m T51	—N/a				1:25.05	5
Jonnie Peacock MBE	100 m T44	10.81 PR	1 Q	—N/a		10.81 =PR	1st place, gold medalist(s)
Derek Rae	Marathon T46	—N/a				DNF	
Ben Rowlings	100 m T34	17.30	5	—N/a		Did not advance	
Ben Rowlings	800 m T34	1:48.08	5	—N/a		Did not advance	
Andrew Small	100 m T33	—N/a				17.96 PB	3rd place, bronze medalist(s)
Isaac Towers	800 m T34	1:47.75	4 q	—N/a		1:43.45 PB	5
David Weir CBE	400 m T54	46.65	1 Q	—N/a		47.30	5
David Weir CBE	800 m T54	1:37.30	1 Q	—N/a		1:35.20	6
David Weir CBE	1500 m T54	3:06.28	2 Q	—N/a		3:01.08	4
David Weir CBE	Marathon T54	—N/a				DNF	
Richard Whitehead MBE	100 m T42	12.38	2 Q	—N/a		12.32	2nd place, silver medalist(s)
Richard Whitehead MBE	200 m T42	23.07 PR	1 Q	—N/a		23.39	1st place, gold medalist(s)
Richard Chiassaro; Moatez Jomni; Nathan Maguire; David Weir CBE	4 × 400 m relay T53–54	3:14.43	2	—N/a		Did not advance	

Field

Athlete	Events	Result	Rank
Jonathan Broom-Edwards	High Jump F44	2.10 SB	2nd place, silver medalist(s)
Aled Davies MBE	Shot Put F42	15.97 PR	1st place, gold medalist(s)
Kyron Duke	Shot Put F41	11.41	5
Kyron Duke	Javelin F41	39.30 PB	6
Dan Greaves	Discus F44	59.57	3rd place, bronze medalist(s)
Stephen Miller MBE	Club Throw F32	31.93 SB	3rd place, bronze medalist(s)
Sam Ruddock	Shot Put F35	12.70	6
Kieran Tscherniawsky	Shot Put F33	8.49	5

Women
Track

Athlete	Events	Heat		Semifinal		Final	
Athlete	Events	Time	Rank	Time	Rank	Time	Rank
Kare Adenegan	100 m T34	—N/a				18.29 PB	2nd place, silver medalist(s)
Kare Adenegan	400 m T34	—N/a				1:01.67 PB	3rd place, bronze medalist(s)
Kare Adenegan	800 m T34	—N/a				2:02.47 PB	3rd place, bronze medalist(s)
Olivia Breen	100 m T38	13.35	4 q	—N/a		13.41	7
Libby Clegg (Chris Clarke – guide)	100 m T11	12.17	=1 Q	11.91 WR	1 Q	11.96	1st place, gold medalist(s)
Libby Clegg (Chris Clarke – guide)	200 m T11	25.90	1 Q	25.24	1 Q	24.51 PR	1st place, gold medalist(s)
Hannah Cockroft MBE	100 m T34	—N/a				17.42 PR	1st place, gold medalist(s)
Hannah Cockroft MBE	400 m T34	—N/a				58.78 WR	1st place, gold medalist(s)
Hannah Cockroft MBE	800 m T34	—N/a				2:00.62 SB	1st place, gold medalist(s)
Kadeena Cox	100 m T38	12.98	2 Q	—N/a		13.01	3rd place, bronze medalist(s)
Kadeena Cox	400 m T38	—N/a				1:00.71 WR	1st place, gold medalist(s)
Sophie Hahn	100 m T38	12.62 PR	1 Q	—N/a		12.62 PR	1st place, gold medalist(s)
Georgina Hermitage	100 m T37	13.39 =WR	1 Q	—N/a		13.13 WR	1st place, gold medalist(s)
Georgina Hermitage	400 m T37	1:03.44 PR	1 Q	—N/a		1:00.53 WR	1st place, gold medalist(s)
Jade Jones	800 m T54	1:53.61	4	—N/a		Did not advance	
Jade Jones	1500 m T54	3:32.88	8	—N/a		Did not advance	
Jade Jones	5000 m T54	12:17.83	7	—N/a		Did not advance	
Sophie Kamlish	100 m T44	12.93 WR	1 Q	—N/a		13.16	4
Samantha Kinghorn	100 m T53	17.01	2 Q	—N/a		17.13	5
Samantha Kinghorn	400 m T53	56.76	4 q	—N/a		DSQ	
Samantha Kinghorn	800 m T53	1:48.89	3 Q	—N/a		1:49.51	6
Maria Lyle	100 m T35	—N/a				14.41	3rd place, bronze medalist(s)
Maria Lyle	200 m T35	—N/a				29.35 SB	3rd place, bronze medalist(s)
Polly Maton	100 m T47	12.98	2 Q	—N/a		13.09	5
Mel Nicholls	400 m T34	—N/a				DNS	
Mel Nicholls	800 m T34	—N/a				2:13.59	5
Julie Rogers	100 m T42	17.41	5	—N/a		Did not advance	
Laura Sugar	100 m T44	13.59	3 q	—N/a		13.37 PB	5
Laura Sugar	200 m T44	28.04 PB	3 Q	—N/a		28.31	5
Carly Tait	100 m T34	—N/a				19.73	6
Kadeena Cox; Sophie Hahn; Georgina Hermitage; Maria Lyle	4 × 100 m relay T35–38	—N/a				51.07	2nd place, silver medalist(s)

Field

Athlete	Events	Result	Rank
Hollie Arnold	Javelin F46	43.01 WR	1st place, gold medalist(s)
Olivia Breen	Long Jump T38	3.99	12
Joanna Butterfield	Club Throw F51	22.81 WR	1st place, gold medalist(s)
Joanna Butterfield	Discus F51	9.40 SB	5
Vanessa Daobry	Shot Put F34	7.27	5
Sabrina Fortune	Shot Put F20	12.94 PB	3rd place, bronze medalist(s)
Kylie Grimes	Club Throw F51	18.75	4
Abbie Hunnisett	Club Throw F32	19.00	4
Beverley Jones	Discus F38	28.53	5
Polly Maton	Long Jump T47	5.10	7
Holly Neill	Discus F41	23.13	8
Gemma Prescott	Club Throw F32	19.77	3rd place, bronze medalist(s)
Stefanie Reid	Long Jump T44	5.64	2nd place, silver medalist(s)

== Boccia ==
Great Britain achieved qualification in the BC1/2 class by winning the gold medal at the 2015 European Teams & Pairs Championships. Great Britain secured qualification for Rio in the BC3 and BC4 Pairs by finishing among the top four previously unqualified nations when the final BISFed world rankings were announced at the end of April 2016. As Great Britain has won quotas in all of the events they must include at least two women competitors across the three team combinations. On 15 July 2016, the British Paralympic Association announced the names of the ten athletes who will represent Team GB in Rio.

Individual

Key – CP = Competition Partner

Athlete	Event	Pool matches				Quarterfinals	Semifinals	Final / BM	
Athlete	Event	Opposition Score	Opposition Score	Opposition Score	Rank	Opposition Score	Opposition Score	Opposition Score	Rank
David Smith (CP – Sarah Nolan)	Mixed individual BC1	Nagy (SVK); W 13–0	Zhang (CHN); W 4–2	Marques (POR); L 3–9	2 Q	Tadtong (THA); W 4–4	Yoo (KOR); W 5–3	Perez (NED); W 5–0	1st place, gold medalist(s)
Nigel Murray MBE	Mixed individual BC2	Martín (ESP); L 2–8	Vongsa (THA); L 1–8	—N/a	3	Did not advance			
Joshua Rowe	Mixed individual BC2	Saengampa (THA); L 0–10	Goncalves (POR); L 2–7	—N/a	3	Did not advance			
Jamie McCowan (CP – Linda McCowan)	Mixed individual BC3	Polychronidis (GRE); L 1–9	Michel (AUS); L 2–3	—N/a	3	Did not advance			
Scott McCowan (CP – Gary McCowan)	Mixed individual BC3	Taha (SIN); W 3–2	Jeong (KOR); L 1–7	—N/a	2	Did not advance			
Patrick Wilson (CP – Kim Smith)	Mixed individual BC3	Peixoto (POR); W 4–2	Takahashi (JPN); W 5–3	—N/a	1 Q	Kim (KOR); L 3–4	Did not advance		
Stephen McGuire	Mixed individual BC4	Clara (POR); W 4–3	Lau (HKG); W 7–5	Pinto (BRA); L 2–6	1 Q	Leung (HKG); L 2–4	Did not advance		
Kieran Steer	Mixed individual BC4	Dos Santos (BRA); L 0–10	Larpyen (THA); L 0–5	Andrejcik (SVK); L 3–9	4	Did not advance			

Pairs and teams

Athlete	Event	Pool matches				Quarterfinals	Semifinals	Final / BM	
Athlete	Event	Opposition Score	Opposition Score	Opposition Score	Rank	Opposition Score	Opposition Score	Opposition Score	Rank
David Smith; Nigel Murray MBE; Joshua Rowe; Claire Taggart	Mixed team BC1-2	Netherlands (NED); W 11–2	Japan (JPN); L 4–10	—N/a	2 Q	Thailand (THA); L 0–11	Did not advance		
Jamie McCowan (CP – Linda McCowan); Scott McCowan (CP – Gary McCowan); Patrick Wilson (CP- Kim Smith)	Mixed pair B3	Portugal (POR); L 3–4	Greece (GRE); L 1–4	Singapore (SIN); W 3–1	4	—N/a	Did not advance		
Evie Edwards; Stephen McGuire; Kieran Steer	Mixed pair B4	Slovakia (SVK); W 4–2	Portugal (POR); W 10–4	Hong Kong (HKG); W 2–2	1 Q	—N/a	Brazil (BRA); L 2–4	Thailand (THA); L 2–3	4

== Cycling ==
Great Britain secured one quota place in both men's and women's events in Rio by finishing 7th and 2nd respectively in the NPC UCI Para-Cycling European Nations ranking lists as at 31 December 2014. Further quotas were gained from world ranking points in April 2016. On 17 June 2016, the British Paralympic Association announced a team of eleven cyclists and four pilots.

On 1 August, the final two cyclists were announced – dual Paralympian Kadeena Cox, aiming to be the first British paralympian to compete in two sports at the same Games since 1992 and the first to win medals in two sports since Isabel Newstead MBE (athletics and shooting) in 1988, was added to the cycling team for both track and road races, having already been named in the athletics team, and Louis Rolfe was added to the track team.

On 24 August, three more exceptional announcements were made following the decision by the International Paralympic Committee, upheld by the Court of Arbitration for Sport to exclude Russia from the 2016 Paralympic Games as a consequence of the state-sponsored doping programme uncovered in the McLaren Report. Paralympics GB announced seven new athletes who inherited quota places vacated by the Russian team, among them cyclists Crystal Lane, James Ball and his pilot, former Olympian Craig MacLean MBE.

=== Road ===
Athlete	Event	Time	Rank
James Ball (Craig MacLean MBE – pilot)	Men's time trial B	DNF	
Stephen Bate (Adam Duggleby – pilot)	Men's road race B	2:27:03	3rd place, bronze medalist(s)
Stephen Bate (Adam Duggleby – pilot)	Men's time trial B	34:35.33	1st place, gold medalist(s)
Kadeena Cox	Women's road race C4–5	DNS	
Karen Darke	Women's road race H1–4	DNF	
Karen Darke	Women's time trial H1–3	33:44.93	1st place, gold medalist(s)
Hannah Dines	Women's road race T1–2	1:09:03	5
Hannah Dines	Women's time trial T1–2	28:51.20	5
Neil Fachie MBE (Peter Mitchell – pilot)	Men's road race B	DNF	
Megan Giglia	Women's road race C1–3	1:30:40	7
Megan Giglia	Women's time trial C1–3	31:44.56	6
Crystal Lane	Women's road race C4–5	2:21:58	3rd place, bronze medalist(s)
Crystal Lane	Women's time trial C5	29:37.23	4
Louis Rolfe	Men's time trial C2	29:12.16	7
David Stone MBE	Men's road race T1–2	51:00	2nd place, silver medalist(s)
David Stone MBE	Men's time trial T1–2	24:42.25	3rd place, bronze medalist(s)
Sarah Storey	Women's road race C4–5	2:15:42	1st place, gold medalist(s)
Sarah Storey	Women's time trial C5	27:22.42	1st place, gold medalist(s)
Lora Turnham (Corrine Hall – pilot)	Women's road race B	2:01:16	4
Lora Turnham (Corrine Hall – pilot)	Women's time trial B	39:33.81	3rd place, bronze medalist(s)

=== Track ===
Athlete	Event	Qualification		Final	
Athlete	Event	Time	Rank	Opposition Time	Rank
James Ball (Craig MacLean MBE – pilot)	Men's 1000 m time trial B	—N/a		1:02.316	5
Stephen Bate (Adam Duggleby – pilot)	Men's individual pursuit B	4:08.146 WR	1 Q	ter Schure / Fransen (p) (NED); W 4:08.631	1st place, gold medalist(s)
Jon-Allan Butterworth	Men's 1000 m time trial C4–5	—N/a		1:04.733	4
Kadeena Cox	Women's 500 m time trial C4–5	—N/a		34.598 WR	1st place, gold medalist(s)
Jody Cundy MBE	Men's 1000 m time trial C4–5	—N/a		1:02.473 PR	1st place, gold medalist(s)
Neil Fachie (Peter Mitchell – pilot)	Men's 1000 m time trial B	—N/a		1:00.241	2nd place, silver medalist(s)
Megan Giglia	Women's individual pursuit C1–3	4:03.544 WR	1 Q	Whitmore (USA); W OVL	1st place, gold medalist(s)
Megan Giglia	Women's 500 m time trial C1–3	—N/a		41.252 WR†	5
Crystal Lane	Women's individual pursuit C5	3:48.802	2 Q	Storey (GBR); L OVL	2nd place, silver medalist(s)
Crystal Lane	Women's 500 m time trial C4–5	—N/a		37.346	5
Louis Rolfe	Men's individual pursuit C2	3:49.908	4 Q	Galvis Becerra (COL); W 3:47.951	3rd place, bronze medalist(s)
Louis Rolfe	Men's 1000 m time trial C1–3	—N/a		1:10.582	6
Dame Sarah Storey DBE	Women's individual pursuit C5	3:31.394 WR	1 Q	Lane (GBR); W OVL	1st place, gold medalist(s)
Dame Sarah Storey DBE	Women's 500 m time trial C4–5	—N/a		37.068	4
Sophie Thornhill (Helen Scott – pilot)	Women's individual pursuit B	3:32.609	3 Q	Cameron / Van Kampen (p) (NZL); W OVL	3rd place, bronze medalist(s)
Sophie Thornhill (Helen Scott – pilot)	Women's 1000 m time trial B	—N/a		1:06.283 PR	1st place, gold medalist(s)
Lora Turnham (Corrine Hall – pilot)	Women's individual pursuit B	3:27.460 PR	1 Q	Foy / Thompson (p) (NZL); W 3:28.050	1st place, gold medalist(s)
Jon-Allan Butterworth; Jody Cundy MBE; Louis Rolfe	Mixed team sprint	49.060 WR	1 Q	China (CHN); W 48.635 WR	1st place, gold medalist(s)

†The Women's 500 metres C1-3 time trial is a factored event. Although finishing 5th after factoring, Megan Giglia's time is recognised as a world record in her classification.

== Equestrian ==
Great Britain were one of three nations to qualify a team for dressage via their results at the 2014 FEI World Equestrian Games, where Lee Pearson CBE, Sophie Christiansen OBE, Sophie Wells MBE and Natasha Baker MBE won gold in the team event. On 8 March 2016, the FEI confirmed that Great Britain had achieved an additional quota in the individual dressage competition. The five riders selected by the British Paralympic Association to represent Great Britain in Rio were announced on 14 July.

Individual

Athlete	Horse	Event	Total	
Athlete	Horse	Event	Score	Rank
Natasha Baker MBE	Cabral	Individual championship test grade II	73.400	1st place, gold medalist(s)
Natasha Baker MBE	Cabral	Individual freestyle test grade II	77.900	1st place, gold medalist(s)
Sophie Christiansen OBE	Athene Lindebjerg	Individual championship test grade Ia	78.217	1st place, gold medalist(s)
Sophie Christiansen OBE	Athene Lindebjerg	Individual freestyle test grade Ia	79.700	1st place, gold medalist(s)
Anne Dunham MBE	Lucas Normark	Individual championship test grade Ia	74.348	2nd place, silver medalist(s)
Anne Dunham MBE	Lucas Normark	Individual freestyle test grade Ia	76.050	2nd place, silver medalist(s)
Lee Pearson CBE	Zion	Individual championship test grade Ib	74.103	2nd place, silver medalist(s)
Lee Pearson CBE	Zion	Individual freestyle test grade Ib	77.400	1st place, gold medalist(s)
Sophie Wells MBE	Valerius	Individual championship test grade IV	74.857	1st place, gold medalist(s)
Sophie Wells MBE	Valerius	Individual freestyle test grade IV	76.150	2nd place, silver medalist(s)

Team

Athlete	Horse	Event	Individual score			Total	
Athlete	Horse	Event	TT	CT	Total	Score	Rank
Sophie Christiansen OBE	See above	Team	77.522	78.217	155.739*	453.306	1st place, gold medalist(s)
Anne Dunham MBE	See above	Team	73.957	74.348	148.305*	453.306	1st place, gold medalist(s)
Sophie Wells MBE	See above	Team	74.405	74.857	149.262*	453.306	1st place, gold medalist(s)
Natasha Baker MBE	See above	Team	71.882	73.400	145.282	453.306	1st place, gold medalist(s)

* Indicates the three best individual scores that count towards the team total. Although not competing in the team event, Lee Pearson CBE rode as an individual in the Grade Ib Team Test, finishing first with a score of 75.280.

== Football 7-a-side ==
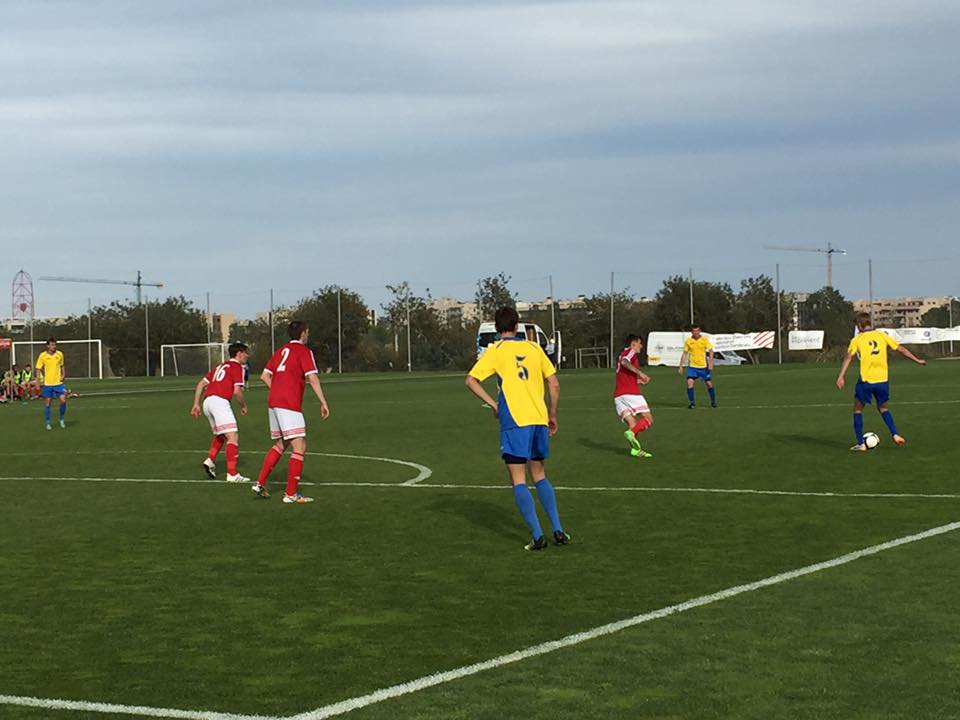
Great Britain plays Ukraine at the IFCPF Pre Paralympic Tournament Salou 2016, the last major preparation tournament ahead of the Rio Games.

Great Britain secured qualification for Rio by finishing fifth at the 2015 Cerebral Palsy Football World Championships.

The draw for the tournament was held on May 6 at the 2016 Pre Paralympic Tournament in Salou, Spain. Great Britain was put into Group A with Ukraine, Brazil and Ireland. The tournament where the draw took place featured 7 of the 8 teams participating in Rio. It was the last major preparation event ahead of the Rio Games for all teams participating. Great Britain finished fourth, after losing 2 – 3 to the Netherlands in the 3rd place match.

Going into the Rio Games, England was ranked seventh in the world, while Scotland was ninth, Northern Ireland was thirteenth and Wales was unranked. No Great Britain team was ranked. On 13 June 2016, the British Paralympic Association announced the selection of the fourteen members of the British 7-a-side squad. The team included several players from Scotland. These were FT7 classified players Martin Hickman, Jonathan Paterson and David Porcher.

Squad list	Group stage				Semifinal	Final	
Squad list	Opposition Result	Opposition Result	Opposition Result	Rank	Opposition Result	Opposition Result	Rank
Michael Barker; James Blackwell; Matt Crossen; Martin Hickman; Sean Highdale; Liam Irons; Ryan Kay; David Leavy; Giles Moore; Ollie Nugent; Jonathan Paterson; David Porcher; Emyle Rudder; Jack Rutter	Brazil; L 1–2	Ukraine; L 1–2	Ireland; W 5–1	3	Did not advance	Classification 5–6; Argentina; W 2–0	5

Group play

Pos	Team	Pld	W	D	L	GF	GA	GD	Pts	Qualification
1	Ukraine	3	3	0	0	10	2	+8	9	Semi finals
2	Brazil (H)	3	2	0	1	10	4	+6	6	Semi finals
3	Great Britain	3	1	0	2	7	5	+2	3	5th–6th place match
4	Ireland	3	0	0	3	2	18	−16	0	7th–8th place match

Source: Paralympic.org
(H) Hosts
8 September 2016
10:00

Brazil	2–1	Great Britain
Leandrinho 10'; Maycon 22'	Report	Porcher 33'

Deodoro Stadium, Rio de Janeiro
Attendance: 2,320
Referee: Jorge Barbisan (Argentina)

10 September 2016
10:00

Great Britain	1–2	Ukraine
Barker 35'	Report	Antonyuk 25'; Krasylnykov 47'

Deodoro Stadium, Rio de Janeiro
Attendance: 8,981
Referee: Paulo Volpato (Brazil)

12 September 2016
16:15

Ireland	1–5	Great Britain
Tuite 59'	Report	Rutter 1'; Barker 8'; Evans 30+2' (o.g.); Blackwell 30+2'; Highdale 59'

Deodoro Stadium, Rio de Janeiro
Attendance: 3,244
Referee: Hector Robas Bondia (Spain)

Classification 5–6

14 September 2016
16:15

Great Britain	2–0	Argentina
Crossen 20'; Barker 46'	Report

Deodoro Stadium, Rio de Janeiro
Attendance: 3,131
Referee: Skye Arthur-Banning (Canada)

== Judo ==
On 11 February 2016, the British Paralympic Association announced the names of the four judokas selected to fill the quotas secured by Great Britain at Rio2016. A fifth was added on 24 August 2016 following the exclusion of Russian athletes for state-sponsored doping.

Athlete	Event	Preliminaries	Quarterfinals	Semifinals	Repechage First round	Repechage Final	Final / BM	
Athlete	Event	Opposition Result	Opposition Result	Opposition Result	Opposition Result	Opposition Result	Opposition Result	Rank
Jonathan Drane	Men's −81 kg	Khalilov (UZB); W 0–0s3	Jonard (FRA); W 2s2–0	Lee (KOR); L 0s3–100s1	—N/a		Safarov (AZE); L 0s3–100s2	5
Sam Ingram	Men's −90 kg	Bye	Hierrezuelo (CUB); L 1s3–100s1	Did not advance	Hirose (JPN); W 100s1–0s4	da Silva (BRA); W 100–0s1	Crockett (USA); L 0s1–2	5
Chris Skelley	Men's −100 kg	Bye	Tenorio (BRA); L 0s3–0s2	Did not advance	Upmann (GER); W 100s1–0s1	Bolukbasi (TUR); W 0s1–0s2	Sastre (CUB); L 0s1–3	5
Jack Hodgson	Men's +100 kg	Bye	Masaki (JPN); L 0–101s1	Did not advance	Hayran (TUR); W 100s1–0	Zakiyev (AZE); L 0–1s1	Did not advance	
Natalie Greenhough	Women's −70 kg	—N/a	Martins (BRA); L 0s2–101	Did not advance	—N/a	Breskovic (CRO); L 0–101	Did not advance	

== Paracanoeing ==
Great Britain secured four quotas at the 2015 ICF Canoe Sprint World Championships where paracanoeing formed part of the programme. Britain secured further quotas in the Men's KL1 and KL2 classes at the 2016 ICF Paracanoe Sprint World Championships giving them representation in all six events at the Games in Rio. The squad of six athletes was named in June 2016 and includes Jeanette Chippington who has won 12 Paralympic swimming medals at previous Games, Emma Wiggs who competed in 2012 in the sport of sitting volleyball and 2012 rower Nick Beighton.

Athlete	Event	Heats		Semifinal		Final	
Athlete	Event	Time	Rank	Time	Rank	Time	Rank
Ian Marsden	Men's KL1	52.311	1 FA	Bye		51.220	3rd place, bronze medalist(s)
Nick Beighton	Men's KL2	45.970	2 FA	Bye		44.936	3rd place, bronze medalist(s)
Robert Oliver	Men's KL3	44.368	3 SF	42.852	1 FA	42.410	5
Jeanette Chippington	Women's KL1	58.676	1 FA	Bye		58.760	1st place, gold medalist(s)
Emma Wiggs	Women's KL2	54.519	1 FA	Bye		53.288 PB	1st place, gold medalist(s)
Anne Dickins	Women's KL3	53.591	1 FA	Bye		51.348 PB	1st place, gold medalist(s)

Legend: FA = Qualified to final (medal); SF = Qualified to semifinal. PB = Paralympic Best time.

== Paratriathlon ==
Great Britain secured a quota in the women's PT4 classification at the 2015 ITU World Paratriathlon Championships. In March 2016, Lauren Steadman and Alison Patrick met the automatic selection criteria set by British Triathlon by winning gold medals at an ITU World Paratriathlon event held in South Africa. Their selection still has to be verified by the British Paralympic Association in June when the other members of the paratriathlon team will also be selected. On 15 July 2016, the British Paralympic Association announced the selection of eleven athletes to compete in the inaugural Olympic paratriathlon competition in Rio.

Athlete	Event	Swim	Trans 1	Bike	Trans 2	Run	Total time	Rank
Phil Hogg	Men's PT1	11:55	1:34	40:30	1:00	13:21	1:08:20	8
Joe Townsend	Men's PT1	14:47	1:07	36:21	0:39	11:49	1:04:43	6
Andy Lewis	Men's PT2	10:57	1:54	36:58	1:13	20:47	1:11:49	1st place, gold medalist(s)
Ryan Taylor	Men's PT2	14:26	1:39	36:28	1:07	20:40	1:14:20	6
David Hill	Men's PT4	11:04	1:22	35:24	0:45	20:03	1:08:38	10
George Peasgood	Men's PT4	9:41	1:07	33:33	0:37	21:10	1:06:08	7
Clare Cunningham	Women's PT4	12:08	1:31	41:28	1:01	22:54	1:19:02	7
Faye McClelland	Women's PT4	12:42	1:28	38:52	0:51	21:15	1:15:08	4
Lauren Steadman	Women's PT4	11:12	1:20	36:44	0:45	21:42	1:11:43	2nd place, silver medalist(s)
Alison Patrick (Guide – Hazel Smith)	Women's PT5	12:01	1:29	34:01	0:54	21:07	1:13:20	2nd place, silver medalist(s)
Melissa Reid (Guide – Nicole Walters)	Women's PT5	12:05	1:31	33:34	0:51	22:18	1:14:07	3rd place, bronze medalist(s)

Lauren Steadman participated in the Rio test event, winning the PT4 class in a time of 1:08:46.

== Powerlifting ==
Great Britain secured four quotas for Rio 2016. On 18 April 2016, the British Paralympic Association announced the four powerlifters who have been selected to represent Great Britain in Rio.

Athlete	Event	Total lifted	Rank
Zoe Newson	Women's −45 kg	102	3rd place, bronze medalist(s)
Natalie Blake	Women's −55 kg	93	6
Ali Jawad	Men's −59 kg	190	2nd place, silver medalist(s)
Micky Yule	Men's −65 kg	180	6

== Rowing ==
Great Britain secured qualification in all four paralympic classes at the 2015 World Rowing Championships. On 30 June 2016, the British Paralympic Association announced the British rowing squad selected for Rio.

Athlete(s)	Event	Heats		Repechage		Final	
Athlete(s)	Event	Time	Rank	Time	Rank	Time	Rank
Tom Aggar	Men's single sculls	4:50.99	2 R	4:56.17	1 FA	4:50.90	3rd place, bronze medalist(s)
Rachel Morris	Women's single sculls	5:32.15	1 FA	Bye		5:13.69 PB	1st place, gold medalist(s)
Lauren Rowles; Laurence Whiteley	Mixed double sculls	3:52.16 WB	1 FA	Bye		3:55.28	1st place, gold medalist(s)
Grace Clough; Daniel Brown; Pam Relph MBE; James Fox; Oliver James (cox)	Mixed coxed four	3:25.08	1 FA	Bye		3:17.17	1st place, gold medalist(s)

Legend: FA = Final A (medal); FB = Final B (non-medal); R = Repechage. WB = World Best time, PB = Paralympic Best time.

== Sailing ==
Great Britain qualified a boat for all three sailing classes at the Games through their results at the 2014 Disabled Sailing World Championships held in Halifax, Nova Scotia, Canada. 2012 Summer Paralympics gold medallist Helena Lucas secured a British place in the 2.4mR event by winning the silver medal at the Championships; Alexandra Rickham and Niki Birrell won silver to qualify a boat in the SKUD 18-class and a crew also qualified for the three-person Sonar class. On 28 April 2015, Helena Lucas became the first British athlete to be selected to compete at either the Olympic or Paralympic Games in Rio when she was chosen to represent Great Britain in the 2.4mR sailing class. On 1 March 2016, Paralympics GB announced the selection of the five sailors who will represent Great Britain in the SKUD and Sonar classes in Rio.

Athlete	Event	Race											Total points	Rank
Athlete	Event	1	2	3	4	5	6	7	8	9	10	11	Total points	Rank
Helena Lucas MBE	2.4 mR – 1 person keelboat	1	2	4	~~17~~	3	1	4	2	3	5	13	38	3rd place, bronze medalist(s)
Alex Rickham; Niki Birrell	SKUD 18 – 2 person keelboat	4	3	4	2	1	~~12~~	5	4	4	5	4	36	3rd place, bronze medalist(s)
John Robertson; Stephen Thomas; Hannah Stodel	Sonar – 3 person keelboat	11	9	14	1	1	1	~~15~~	6	8	10	3	64	9

== Shooting ==
Great Britain secured three quota places at the 2014 IPC Shooting World Championships. Britain secured three further quotas at the 2015 IPC Shooting World Cup in Croatia. Further quotas were achieved at the World Cup event held in the USA later in 2015. On 8 April 2016, the IPC announced that Issy Bailey was one of eleven shooters to be issued with a Bipartite invitation to compete in Rio. On 10 June 2016, the British Paralympic Association announced the names of the ten shooters who will represent Team GB in Rio. Great Britain had secured a second quota in the 10 m air pistol SH1 class but following the death in May of Roy Carter this was not taken up.

Athlete	Event	Qualification		Final	
Athlete	Event	Score	Rank	Score	Rank
Issy Bailey	Women's P2 – 10 m air pistol SH1	359–5x	14	Did not advance	
James Bevis	Mixed R4 – 10 m air rifle standing SH2	624.3	18	Did not advance	
James Bevis	Mixed R5 – 10 m air rifle prone SH2	627.2	30	Did not advance	
Owen Burke	Men's R1 – 10 m air rifle standing SH1	321.1	22	Did not advance	
Owen Burke	Mixed R3 – 10 m air rifle prone SH1	602.5	45	Did not advance	
Karen Butler	Women's R2 – 10 m air rifle standing SH1	400.2	14	Did not advance	
Karen Butler	Women's R8 – 50 m rifle 3 positions SH1	544–11x	15	Did not advance	
Karen Butler	Mixed R6 – 50 m rifle prone SH1	604.9	33	Did not advance	
Ryan Cockbill	Mixed R4 – 10 m air rifle standing SH2	629.9	9	Did not advance	
Ryan Cockbill	Mixed R5 – 10 m air rifle prone SH2	633.3	9	Did not advance	
Richard Davies	Mixed R4 – 10 m air rifle standing SH2	629.6	11	Did not advance	
Tim Jeffery	Mixed R5 – 10 m air rifle prone SH2	633.1	10	Did not advance	
Ben Jesson	Mixed R3 – 10 m air rifle prone SH1	620.5	38	Did not advance	
Lorraine Lambert	Women's R2 – 10 m air rifle standing SH1	399.1	15	Did not advance	
Lorraine Lambert	Women's R8 – 50 m rifle 3 positions SH1	560–13x	6 Q	412.0	5
Lorraine Lambert	Mixed R6 – 50 m rifle prone SH1	605.3	31	Did not advance	
Stewart Nangle	Men's P1 – 10 m air pistol SH1	562–8x	4 Q	112.5	6
Stewart Nangle	Mixed P3 – 25 m pistol SH1	562–15x	11	Did not advance	
Stewart Nangle	Mixed P4 – 50 m pistol SH1	528–8x	7 Q	64.3	8
Matt Skelhon	Mixed R3 – 10 m air rifle prone SH1	632.1	11	Did not advance	
Matt Skelhon	Mixed R6 – 50 m rifle prone SH1	622.5 PR	1 Q	100.8	7

== Swimming ==
Great Britain secured eleven quotas at the 2015 IPC Swimming World Championships after finishing in the top two places in Paralympic class disciplines. On the 16 May 2016, the British Paralympic Association announced a squad of 31 swimmers to compete in Rio. Although named in the initial squad, injury and health problems forced Tully Kearney to pull out a few weeks before the Games began.

Men

Athlete	Events	Heats		Final	
Athlete	Events	Time	Rank	Time	Rank
Jonathan Booth	400 m freestyle S9	4:24.86	6 Q	4:24.02	5
Stephen Clegg	50 m freestyle S12	25.78	12	Did not advance	
Stephen Clegg	100 m freestyle S13	55.85	12	Did not advance	
Stephen Clegg	400 m freestyle S13	4:23.07	9	Did not advance	
Stephen Clegg	100 m backstroke S12	1:03.11	5 Q	1:02.06	5
Josef Craig MBE	50 m freestyle S8	27.36	5 Q	27.27	6
Josef Craig MBE	100 m freestyle S8	58.73	1 Q	58.19	3rd place, bronze medalist(s)
Josef Craig MBE	400 m freestyle S8	4:41.93	7 Q	4:39.89	6
James Crisp	100 m backstroke S9	1:05.00	=1 Q	1:05.01	4
James Crisp	200 m individual medley SM9	2:22.72	7 Q	2:24.96	7
Ryan Crouch	50 m freestyle S9	26.54	7 Q	26.76	8
Ryan Crouch	100 m freestyle S9	58.65	13	Did not advance	
Jonathan Fox MBE	50 m freestyle S7	29.77	5 Q	29.52	6
Jonathan Fox MBE	100 m freestyle S7	1:03.17	1 Q	1:03.91	5
Jonathan Fox MBE	400 m freestyle S7	4:51.10	1 Q	4:49.00	2nd place, silver medalist(s)
Jonathan Fox MBE	100 m backstroke S7	1:11.37	1 Q	1:10.78	2nd place, silver medalist(s)
Thomas Hamer	200 m freestyle S14	1:57.31	2 Q	1:56.58	2nd place, silver medalist(s)
Thomas Hamer	200 m individual medley SM14	2:16.28	3 Q	2:12.88	2nd place, silver medalist(s)
Ollie Hynd MBE	100 m freestyle S8	59.62	4 Q	58.85	4
Ollie Hynd MBE	400 m freestyle S8	4:31.90	1 Q	4:21.89 WR	1st place, gold medalist(s)
Ollie Hynd MBE	100 m backstroke S8	1:06.12	3 Q	1:04.46	2nd place, silver medalist(s)
Ollie Hynd MBE	200 m individual medley SM8	2:25.48	1 Q	2:20.01 WR	1st place, gold medalist(s)
Michael Jones	50 m freestyle S7	30.67	8 Q	29.82	7
Michael Jones	100 m freestyle S7	1:06.06	6 Q	1:04.69	6
Michael Jones	400 m freestyle S7	4:58.50	3 Q	4:45.78	1st place, gold medalist(s)
Sascha Kindred OBE	50 m freestyle S6	33.07	12	Did not advance	
Sascha Kindred OBE	50 m butterfly S6	32.76	5 Q	32.91	6
Sascha Kindred OBE	200 m individual medley SM6	2:43.75	3 Q	2:38.47 WR	1st place, gold medalist(s)
Aaron Moores	100 m backstroke S14	1:07.36	10	Did not advance	
Aaron Moores	100 m breaststroke SB14	1:07.25	2 Q	1:06.67	1st place, gold medalist(s)
Andrew Mullen	50 m freestyle S5	35.75	6 Q	34.87	5
Andrew Mullen	100 m freestyle S5	1:19.58	6 Q	1:15.93	3rd place, bronze medalist(s)
Andrew Mullen	200 m freestyle S5	2:43.20	3 Q	2:40.65	3rd place, bronze medalist(s)
Andrew Mullen	50 m backstroke S5	37.77	2 Q	37.94	2nd place, silver medalist(s)
Andrew Mullen	50 m butterfly S5	38.19	4 Q	36.32	4
Scott Quin	100 m breaststroke SB14	1:06.65 PR	1 Q	1:06.70	2nd place, silver medalist(s)
Lewis White	100 m freestyle S9	58.51	10	Did not advance	
Lewis White	400 m freestyle S9	4:22.63	3 Q	4:21.38	3rd place, bronze medalist(s)
Lewis White	100 m backstroke S9	1:09.86	13	Did not advance	
Matthew Wylie	50 m freestyle S9	25.99	1 Q	25.95	1st place, gold medalist(s)
Matthew Wylie	100 m freestyle S9	59.32	16	Did not advance	
Josef Craig MBE; Ollie Hynd MBE; Lewis White; Matthew Wylie	4 x 100 m freestyle relay 34pts	—N/a		3:51.54	4

Women

Athlete	Events	Heats		Final	
Athlete	Events	Time	Rank	Time	Rank
Jessica-Jane Applegate MBE	200 m freestyle S14	2:07.95	2 Q	2:06.92	2nd place, silver medalist(s)
Jessica-Jane Applegate MBE	100 m backstroke S14	1:08.41	3 Q	1:08.67	3rd place, bronze medalist(s)
Jessica-Jane Applegate MBE	100 m breaststroke SB14	1:26.56	9	Did not advance	
Jessica-Jane Applegate MBE	200 m individual medley SM14	2:30.11	2 Q	2:27.58	2nd place, silver medalist(s)
Claire Cashmore	100 m breaststroke SB8	1:25.91	4 Q	1:20.60	2nd place, silver medalist(s)
Claire Cashmore	100 m butterfly S9	1:09.77	2 Q	1:09.46	5
Claire Cashmore	200 m individual medley SM9	2:39.68	8 Q	2:38.34	8
Bethany Firth	200 m freestyle S14	2:05.96 PR	1 Q	2:03.30 PR	1st place, gold medalist(s)
Bethany Firth	100 m backstroke S14	1:04.53 WR	1 Q	1:04.05 WR	1st place, gold medalist(s)
Bethany Firth	100 m breaststroke SB14	1:18.19	3 Q	1:12.89	2nd place, silver medalist(s)
Bethany Firth	200 m individual medley SM14	2:23.78 PR	1 Q	2:19.55 PR	1st place, gold medalist(s)
Charlotte Henshaw	100 m breaststroke SB6	1:38.11	2 Q	1:37.79	3rd place, bronze medalist(s)
Abby Kane	50 m freestyle S13	29.98	17	Did not advance	
Abby Kane	400 m freestyle S13	4:52.35	7 Q	4:49.27	6
Abby Kane	100 m backstroke S13	1:09.09 PR	1 Q	1:09.30	2nd place, silver medalist(s)
Harriet Lee	100 m breaststroke SB9	1:23.97	7 Q	1:16.87	2nd place, silver medalist(s)
Harriet Lee	200 m individual medley SM10	2:35.90	4 Q	2:34.91	7
Amy Marren	50 m freestyle S9	30.80	12	Did not advance	
Amy Marren	100 m freestyle S9	1:05.63	10	Did not advance	
Amy Marren	400 m freestyle S9	4:54.44	4 Q	4:55.38	5
Amy Marren	100 m backstroke S9	1:14.06	4 Q	1:14.58	6
Amy Marren	200 m individual medley SM9	2:37.01	1 Q	2:36.26	3rd place, bronze medalist(s)
Stephanie Millward	50 m freestyle S8	30.82 PR	1 Q	30.73	5
Stephanie Millward	100 m freestyle S8	1:08.24	4 Q	1:05.16	3rd place, bronze medalist(s)
Stephanie Millward	400 m freestyle S8	4:59.95	3 Q	4:49.89	3rd place, bronze medalist(s)
Stephanie Millward	100 m backstroke S8	1:13.75 PR	1 Q	1:13.02 PR	1st place, gold medalist(s)
Stephanie Millward	200 m individual medley SM8	2:45.91	2 Q	2:43.03	2nd place, silver medalist(s)
Rebecca Redfern	100 m breaststroke SB13	1:17.08 PR	1 Q	1:13.81	2nd place, silver medalist(s)
Ellie Robinson	50 m freestyle S6	34.99	3 Q	35.24	4
Ellie Robinson	100 m freestyle S6	1:16.76	4 Q	1:14.43	3rd place, bronze medalist(s)
Ellie Robinson	400 m freestyle S6	5:41.04	4 Q	5:27.53	4
Ellie Robinson	50 m butterfly S6	36.62	1 Q	35.58 PR	1st place, gold medalist(s)
Susie Rodgers	50 m freestyle S7	34.42	4 Q	33.26	3rd place, bronze medalist(s)
Susie Rodgers	100 m freestyle S7	1:13.96	4 Q	1:12.92	4
Susie Rodgers	400 m freestyle S7	—N/a		5:23.17	3rd place, bronze medalist(s)
Susie Rodgers	50 m butterfly S7	36.02	2 Q	35.07	1st place, gold medalist(s)
Hannah Russell	50 m freestyle S12	27.79	1 Q	27.53	1st place, gold medalist(s)
Hannah Russell	100 m freestyle S13	59.99	1 Q	1:00.07	3rd place, bronze medalist(s)
Hannah Russell	100 m backstroke S12	—N/a		1:06.06 WR	1st place, gold medalist(s)
Ellie Simmonds OBE	50 m freestyle S6	36.44	4 Q	35.54	6
Ellie Simmonds OBE	100 m freestyle S6	1:16.39	3 Q	1:15.77	5
Ellie Simmonds OBE	400 m freestyle S6	5:37.75	3 Q	5:24.87	3rd place, bronze medalist(s)
Ellie Simmonds OBE	100 m breaststroke SB6	1:43.49	5 Q	1:39.46	4
Ellie Simmonds OBE	200 m individual medley SM6	3:02.40 PR	1 Q	2:59.81 WR	1st place, gold medalist(s)
Stephanie Slater	50 m freestyle S8	31.17	5 Q	30.54	4
Stephanie Slater	100 m backstroke S8	1:20.17	4 Q	1:19.42	5
Stephanie Slater	100 m butterfly S8	1:16.32	5 Q	1:10.32	2nd place, silver medalist(s)
Alice Tai	100 m freestyle S10	1:04.32	11	Did not advance	
Alice Tai	100 m backstroke S10	1:09.64	3 Q	1:09.39	3rd place, bronze medalist(s)
Alice Tai	100 m butterfly S10	1:12.98	8 Q	1:11.92	7
Amy Marren; Stephanie Millward; Susie Rodgers; Alice Tai	4 x 100 m freestyle relay 34pts	—N/a		4:26.99	4
Claire Cashmore; Stephanie Millward; Stephanie Slater; Alice Tai	4 x 100 m medley relay 34pts	—N/a		4:45.23 WR	1st place, gold medalist(s)

== Table tennis ==
Rob Davies secured qualification for Rio by winning a gold medal at the 2015 Para Table Tennis European Championships. In November 2015, Aaron McKibbin achieved qualification for Rio by winning a gold medal at the China Open. In addition to the two places already achieved Great Britain secured a further ten quotas based on the ITTF Para Table Tennis rankings as at 31 December 2015. On 8 March 2016, the British Paralympic Association confirmed the selection of the twelve table tennis players who will represent Great Britain in Rio.

Men

Athlete	Event	Group Matches			Round 1	Quarterfinals	Semifinals	Final / BM	
Athlete	Event	Opposition Result	Opposition Result	Rank	Opposition Result	Opposition Result	Opposition Result	Opposition Result	Rank
Paul Davies	Singles class 1	Lee (KOR); L 1–3	Lima (BRA); W 3–2	2 Q	—N/a	Nam (KOR); L 0–3	Did not advance		
Rob Davies	Singles class 1	Keller (SUI); W 3–2	Borgato (ITA); W 3–2	1 Q	—N/a	Ducay (FRA); W 3–0	Major (HUN); W 3–1	Joo (KOR); W 3–1	1st place, gold medalist(s)
Jack Hunter-Spivey	Singles class 5	Baus (GER); L 0–3	Segatto (BRA); L 2–3	3	Did not advance				
Paul Karabardak	Singles class 6	Park (KOR); L 2–3	Pino (CHI); L 2–3	3	Did not advance				
David Wetherill	Singles class 6	Hamadtou (EGY); W 3–0	Rau (GER); L 0–3	2 Q	Pino (CHI); W 3–1	Valera (ESP); L 2–3	Did not advance		
Will Bayley	Singles class 7	Stroh (BRA); L 1–3	Liao (CHN); W 3–0	1 Q	Bye	Youssef (EGY); W 3–0	Morales (ESP); W 3–1	Stroh (BRA); W 3–1	1st place, gold medalist(s)
Aaron McKibbin	Singles class 8	Bouvais (FRA); L 1–3	Ledoux (BEL); W 3–1	1 Q	Bye	Csonka (HUN); L 0–3	Did not advance		
Ross Wilson	Singles class 8	Andersson (SWE); L 2–3	Skrzynecki (POL); L 1–3	3	Did not advance				
Ashley Facey-Thompson	Singles class 9	Perez (ESP); L 0–3	Frączyk (AUT); L 0–3	3	Did not advance				
Kim Daybell	Singles class 10	Jacobs (INA); W 3–2	Hergelink (NED); W 3–2	1 Q	Bye	Lian (CHN); L 1–3	Did not advance		

Women

Athlete	Event	Group Matches			Round 1	Quarterfinals	Semifinals	Final / BM	
Athlete	Event	Opposition Result	Opposition Result	Rank	Opposition Result	Opposition Result	Opposition Result	Opposition Result	Rank
Jane Campbell	Singles class 3	Li (CHN); L 0–3	Duman (TUR); L 2–3	3	Did not advance				
Sara Head	Singles class 3	Ahlquist (SWE); L 0–3	Sigala (MEX); W 3–2	2 Q	Dretar Karic (CRO); W 3–0	Li (CHN); L 0–3	Did not advance		
Sue Gilroy MBE	Singles class 4	Zhang (CHN); L 0–3	Lu (TPE); W 3–2	2 Q	—N/a	Mikolaschek (GER); W 3–2	Peric-Rankovic (SRB); L 0–3	Matic (SRB); L 2–3	4

Teams

Athlete	Event	Round 1	Quarterfinals	Semifinals	Final / BM	
Athlete	Event	Opposition Result	Opposition Result	Opposition Result	Opposition Result	Rank
Paul Davies; Rob Davies	Men's team class 1–2	—N/a	Brazil (BRA); L 0–2	Did not advance		
Will Bayley; Aaron McKibbin; Ross Wilson	Men's team class 6–8	Belgium (BEL); W 2–0	Spain (ESP); W 2–1	Ukraine (UKR); L 0–2	China (CHN); W 2–1	3rd place, bronze medalist(s)
Kim Daybell; Ashley Facey-Thompson	Men's team class 9–10	Italy (ITA); W 2–0	China (CHN); L 0–2	Did not advance		
Jane Campbell; Sara Head	Women's team class 1–3	—N/a	Italy (ITA); L 1–2	Did not advance		

== Wheelchair basketball ==
Great Britain's men's and women's wheelchair basketball teams secured qualification for Rio at the 2015 European Wheelchair Basketball Championship. Great Britain named their men's squad on 20 June 2016.

=== Men's tournament ===
During the draw, Brazil had the choice of which group they wanted to be in. They were partnered with Spain, who would be in the group Brazil did not select. Brazil chose Group B, which included Iran, the United States, Great Britain, Germany and Algeria. That left Spain in Group A with Australia, Canada, Turkey, the Netherlands and Japan.

Squad list	Group stage				Knockout stage			
Squad list	Pool Match 1 Opposition Result	Pool Match 2 Opposition Result	Pool Match 3 Opposition Result	Rank	Quarterfinal Opposition Result	Semifinal Opposition Result	Final / BM Opposition Result	Rank
Harry Brown; Simon Brown (cc); Terry Bywater (cc); Gaz Choudhry; Abdi Jama; Lee Manning; Kyle Marsh; Simon Munn; Ade Orogbemi; Phil Pratt; Ian Sagar; Gregg Warburton: cc= co-captain	Algeria; W 93–31	Iran; W 84–60	Brazil; W 73–55	2 Q	Australia; W 74–51	Spain; L 63–69	Turkey; W 82–76	3rd place, bronze medalist(s)
Harry Brown; Simon Brown (cc); Terry Bywater (cc); Gaz Choudhry; Abdi Jama; Lee Manning; Kyle Marsh; Simon Munn; Ade Orogbemi; Phil Pratt; Ian Sagar; Gregg Warburton: cc= co-captain	Pool Match 4 Opposition Result	Pool Match 5 Opposition Result		2 Q	Australia; W 74–51	Spain; L 63–69	Turkey; W 82–76	3rd place, bronze medalist(s)
Harry Brown; Simon Brown (cc); Terry Bywater (cc); Gaz Choudhry; Abdi Jama; Lee Manning; Kyle Marsh; Simon Munn; Ade Orogbemi; Phil Pratt; Ian Sagar; Gregg Warburton: cc= co-captain	Germany; W 66–52	United States; L 48–65		2 Q	Australia; W 74–51	Spain; L 63–69	Turkey; W 82–76	3rd place, bronze medalist(s)

Group play

Pos	Team	Pld	W	L	PF	PA	PD	Pts	Qualification
1	United States	5	5	0	402	206	+196	10	Quarter-finals
2	Great Britain	5	4	1	364	263	+101	9	Quarter-finals
3	Brazil (H)	5	2	3	309	314	−5	7 (Note: Head-to-head record: Brazil 3 pts, +11 PD; Germany 3 pts, +6 PD; Iran 3 pts, −17 PD)	Quarter-finals
4	Germany	5	2	3	337	314	+23	7	Quarter-finals
5	Iran	5	2	3	295	361	−66	7	9th/10th place playoff
6	Algeria	5	0	5	187	436	−249	5	11th/12th place playoff

Source: Paralympic.org
Rules for classification: 1) Points; 2) Head-to-head results; 3) Points difference; 4) Points scored.
(H) Hosts
Notes:

8 September 2016
11:45

Report

Great Britain	93–31	Algeria
Scoring by quarter: 23–10, 20–13, 20–6, 30–2
Pts: Sagar 19; Rebs: Sagar 11; Asts: Brown, Warburton 7		Pts: Ayache, Mansouri 8 Rebs: Abassi, Guedoun 5 Asts: Guedoun 5

Rio Olympic Arena, Rio de Janeiro
Referees: Mati Quintana

9 September 2016
11:45

Report

Iran	60–84	Great Britain
Scoring by quarter: 13–21, 21–25, 9–19, 17–19
Pts: Gholamazad 20; Rebs: Gholamazad 7 Asts: Gholamazad, Ebrahami 4		Pts: Pratt, Sagar 21; Rebs: Brown, Sagar 7 Asts: Pratt 11

Rio Olympic Arena, Rio de Janeiro
Referees: Juan Urunuela

10 September 2016
21:00

Report[

Great Britain	73–55	Brazil
Scoring by quarter: 15–12, 20–15, 18–16, 20–12
Pts: Choudhry 18; Rebs: Choudhry 10; Asts: Choudhry 9		Pts: Candido Sanchez 9 Rebs: De Miranda 15; Asts: De Miranda, Da Silva 3

Carioca Arena 1, Rio de Janeiro
Referees: Matt Wells

11 September 2016
12:15

Report

Great Britain	66–52	Germany
Scoring by quarter: 12–12, 19–12, 18–15, 17–13
Pts: Sagar 21; Rebs: Choudhry 7 Asts: Sagar, Choudhry 4		Pts: Passiwan 18; Rebs: Bohme 10; Asts: Passiwan 5

Carioca Arena 1, Rio de Janeiro
Referees: Toma Pajer

12 September 2016
15:45

Report

United States	65–48	Great Britain
Scoring by quarter: 13–12, 18–10, 11–15, 23–11
Pts: Williams 12; Rebs: Serio 5 Asts: Serio 8		Pts: Choudrhy 17; Rebs: Choudrhy 9 Asts: Choudrhy 7

Carioca Arena 1, Rio de Janeiro
Referees: Sebastien Gauthier

Quarterfinal

14 September 2016
17:30

Report

Great Britain	74–51	Australia
Scoring by quarter: 11–15, 18–16, 23–14, 22–6
Pts: Sagar 26; Rebs: Sagar, Pratt 10; Asts: Choudhry 10		Pts: Norris 14; Rebs: Knowles 7 Asts: Norris 8

Rio Olympic Arena, Rio de Janeiro
Referees: Cristian Roja

Semifinal

15 September 2016
17:30

Report

Spain	69–63	Great Britain
Scoring by quarter: 12–14, 23–14, 12–15, 20–20
Pts: García, A. Zarzuela 19; Rebs: García 13; Asts: García 13		Pts: Sagar 18; Rebs: Choudrhy 8 Asts: Pratt 8

Rio Olympic Arena, Rio de Janeiro
Referees: Sebastien Gauthier

Bronze medal game

17 September 2016
11:45

Report

Great Britain	82–76 (OT)	Turkey
Scoring by quarter: 16–22, 13–8, 14–19, 22–16, Overtime: 17–11
Pts: Bywater 25; Rebs: Sagar 11; Asts: Pratt 12		Pts: Gürbulak 24; Rebs: Gürbulak 10; Asts: Gürbulak 19

Rio Olympic Arena, Rio de Janeiro
Referees: Krunoslav Peic

=== Women's tournament ===
As hosts, Brazil got to choose which group they were put into. They were partnered with Algeria, who would be put in the group they did not choose. Brazil chose Group A, which included Canada, Germany, Great Britain and Argentina. Algeria ended up in Group B with the United States, the Netherlands, France and China.

Squad list	Group stage			Knockout stage			
Squad list	Pool Match 1 Opposition Result	Pool Match 2 Opposition Result	Rank	Quarterfinal Opposition Result	Semifinal Opposition Result	Final / BM Opposition Result	Rank
Jordanna Bartlett; Sophie Carrigill; Amy Conroy; Leah Evans; Helen Freeman; Clare Griffiths; Joy Haizelden; Judith Hamer; Robyn Love; Charlotte Moore; Katie Morrow; Laurie Williams	Canada; L 36–43	Argentina; W 79–20	2 Q	China; W 57–38	United States; L 78–89	Netherlands; L 34–76	4
Jordanna Bartlett; Sophie Carrigill; Amy Conroy; Leah Evans; Helen Freeman; Clare Griffiths; Joy Haizelden; Judith Hamer; Robyn Love; Charlotte Moore; Katie Morrow; Laurie Williams	Pool Match 3 Opposition Result	Pool Match 4 Opposition Result	2 Q	China; W 57–38	United States; L 78–89	Netherlands; L 34–76	4
Jordanna Bartlett; Sophie Carrigill; Amy Conroy; Leah Evans; Helen Freeman; Clare Griffiths; Joy Haizelden; Judith Hamer; Robyn Love; Charlotte Moore; Katie Morrow; Laurie Williams	Germany; W 50–45	Brazil; W 63–32	2 Q	China; W 57–38	United States; L 78–89	Netherlands; L 34–76	4

Group play

Pos	Team	Pld	W	L	PF	PA	PD	Pts	Qualification
1	Germany	4	3	1	248	156	+92	7 (Note: Head-to-head record: Germany 3 pts, +9 PD; Great Britain 3 pts, −2 PD; Canada 3 pts, −7 PD)	Quarter-finals
2	Great Britain	4	3	1	228	140	+88	7	Quarter-finals
3	Canada	4	3	1	252	181	+71	7	Quarter-finals
4	Brazil (H)	4	1	3	196	241	−45	5	Quarter-finals
5	Argentina	4	0	4	87	296	−209	4	9th/10th place playoff

Source: Paralympic.org
Rules for classification: 1) Points; 2) Head-to-head results; 3) Points difference; 4) Points scored.
(H) Hosts
Notes:

8 September 2016
09:30

Report

Great Britain	36–43	Canada
Scoring by quarter: 12–14, 12–11, 8–10, 4–8
Pts: Freeman, Conroy 14; Rebs: Freeman 15; Asts: Freeman 5		Pts: McLachlan 21; Rebs: McLachlan 22; Asts: Ouellet 6

Rio Olympic Arena, Rio de Janeiro
Referees: Celine Villard

9 September 2016
10:00

Report

Argentina	20–79	Great Britain
Scoring by quarter: 2–20, 4–14, 3–21, 11–24
Pts: Pallares 11; Rebs: Pallares 16; Asts: Capdeville 3		Pts: Morrow 16; Rebs: Love 9 Asts: Haizeldon 5

Carioca Arena 1, Rio de Janeiro
Referees: Philip Haines

10 September 2016
11:45

Report

Great Britain	50–45	Germany
Scoring by quarter: 14–17, 10–7, 12–4, 14–17
Pts: Freeman, Conroy 14; Rebs: Freeman 9 Asts: Freeman 9		Pts: Mohnen 17; Rebs: Miller, Zeyen, Mohnen 6 Asts: Welin, Zeyen, Schunemann, Mohnen 3

Rio Olympic Arena, Rio de Janeiro
Referees: Juan Uruneula

11 September 2016
21:30

Report

Brazil	32–63	Great Britain
Scoring by quarter: 8–15, 6–16, 6–22, 12–10
Pts: Assuncao, Martins 8 Rebs: Viera, Martins 4 Asts: Assuncao 4		Pts: Conroy 15; Rebs: Freeman 15; Asts: Freeman 10

Carioca Arena 1, Rio de Janeiro
Referees: Matt Wells

Quarterfinal

13 September 2016
17:30

Report

Great Britain	57–38	China
Scoring by quarter: 18–12, 17–7, 14–7, 8–12
Pts: Freeman 24; Rebs: Conroy 12; Asts: Freeman 11		Pts: Lei 13; Rebs: Lyu 7 Asts: Long 11

Rio Olympic Arena, Rio de Janeiro
Referees: Sebastien Gauthier

Semifinal

15 September 2016
11:15

Report

Great Britain	78–89	United States
Scoring by quarter: 18–18, 18–23, 13–26, 29–22
Pts: Freeman 29; Rebs: Freeman 6 Asts: Freeman 18		Pts: Miller 26; Rebs: Gaeng, Hollermann 7 Asts: Miller 14

Rio Olympic Arena, Rio de Janeiro
Referees: Matt Wells

Bronze medal game

16 September 2016
11:45

Report

Netherlands	76–34	Great Britain
Scoring by quarter: 17–4, 16–13, 19–11, 24–6
Pts: Beijer 21; Rebs: Beijer 6 Asts: Huitzing 7		Pts: Freeman 7 Rebs: Conroy 5 Asts: Freeman 7

Rio Olympic Arena, Rio de Janeiro
Referees: Carsten Rehling

== Wheelchair fencing ==
Great Britain qualified two athletes to compete in wheelchair fencing via the IWASF world rankings as at 28 May 2016. On 5 July 2016, the British Paralympic Association confirmed the selections of Piers Gilliver and Dimitri Coutya to represent Team GB in Rio.

Athlete	Event	Qualification			Quarterfinal	Semifinal	Final / BM	
Athlete	Event	Opposition	Score	Rank	Opposition Score	Opposition Score	Opposition Score	Rank
Piers Gilliver	Men's individual épée A	Citerne (FRA)	W 5–0	2 Q	Betti (ITA); W 15–11	Al-Madhkhoori (IRQ); W 15–10	Sun (CHN); L 13–15	2nd place, silver medalist(s)
Piers Gilliver	Men's individual épée A	Colaco (BRA)	W 5–0	2 Q	Betti (ITA); W 15–11	Al-Madhkhoori (IRQ); W 15–10	Sun (CHN); L 13–15	2nd place, silver medalist(s)
Piers Gilliver	Men's individual épée A	Mato (HUN)	W 5–2	2 Q	Betti (ITA); W 15–11	Al-Madhkhoori (IRQ); W 15–10	Sun (CHN); L 13–15	2nd place, silver medalist(s)
Piers Gilliver	Men's individual épée A	Pender (POL)	W 5–4	2 Q	Betti (ITA); W 15–11	Al-Madhkhoori (IRQ); W 15–10	Sun (CHN); L 13–15	2nd place, silver medalist(s)
Piers Gilliver	Men's individual épée A	Tian (CHN)	W 5–2	2 Q	Betti (ITA); W 15–11	Al-Madhkhoori (IRQ); W 15–10	Sun (CHN); L 13–15	2nd place, silver medalist(s)
Piers Gilliver	Men's individual foil A	Nalewajek (POL)	L 2–5	10	Did not advance			
Piers Gilliver	Men's individual foil A	Betti (ITA)	W 5–4	10	Did not advance			
Piers Gilliver	Men's individual foil A	Osvath (HUN)	L 1–5	10	Did not advance			
Piers Gilliver	Men's individual foil A	Ye (CHN)	L 1–5	10	Did not advance			
Piers Gilliver	Men's individual foil A	Cheong (HKG)	L 3–5	10	Did not advance			
Dimitri Coutya	Men's individual épée B	Naumenko (UKR)	W 5–3	2 Q	Pranevich (BLR); L 13–15	Did not advance		
Dimitri Coutya	Men's individual épée B	Pranevich (BLR)	W 5–4	2 Q	Pranevich (BLR); L 13–15	Did not advance		
Dimitri Coutya	Men's individual épée B	Tam (HKG)	W 5–2	2 Q	Pranevich (BLR); L 13–15	Did not advance		
Dimitri Coutya	Men's individual épée B	Ifebe (FRA)	L 4–5	2 Q	Pranevich (BLR); L 13–15	Did not advance		
Dimitri Coutya	Men's individual foil B	Sarri (ITA)	W 5–1	4 Q	Hu (CHN); L 12–15	Did not advance		
Dimitri Coutya	Men's individual foil B	Datsko (UKR)	L 4–5	4 Q	Hu (CHN); L 12–15	Did not advance		
Dimitri Coutya	Men's individual foil B	Valet (FRA)	W 5–0	4 Q	Hu (CHN); L 12–15	Did not advance		
Dimitri Coutya	Men's individual foil B	Feng (CHN)	L 3–5	4 Q	Hu (CHN); L 12–15	Did not advance		
Gemma Collis	Women's individual épée A	Krajnyak (HUN)	L 2–5	8 Q	Zou (CHN); L 2–15	Did not advance		
Gemma Collis	Women's individual épée A	Burdon (POL)	W 5–2	8 Q	Zou (CHN); L 2–15	Did not advance		
Gemma Collis	Women's individual épée A	Zou (CHN)	L 0–5	8 Q	Zou (CHN); L 2–15	Did not advance		
Gemma Collis	Women's individual épée A	Deluca (USA)	W 5–2	8 Q	Zou (CHN); L 2–15	Did not advance		
Gemma Collis	Women's individual épée A	Halkina (BLR)	L 4–5	8 Q	Zou (CHN); L 2–15	Did not advance		

== Wheelchair rugby ==
Great Britain's national wheelchair rugby team secured qualification for Rio at the 2015 International Wheelchair Rugby Federation European Championship. On 12 May 2016, Paralympics GB announced the squad of twelve wheelchair rugby players who will represent Great Britain in Rio.

Squad list	Group stage				Knockout stage		
Squad list	Pool Match 1 Opposition Result	Pool Match 2 Opposition Result	Pool Match 3 Opposition Result	Rank	Semifinal Opposition Result	Final Opposition Result	Rank
Alan Ash; Coral Batey; Ayaz Bhuta; Jonathan Coggan; Ryan Cowling; Bulbul Hussain; Mike Kerr; Jim Roberts; Chris Ryan; Mandip Sehmi; Jamie Stead; Gavin Walker	Australia; L 51–53	Canada; L 49–50	Brazil; W 52–32	3	Did not advance	Classification 5–6; Sweden; W 56–42	5

Great Britain was scheduled to open play in Rio against Australia on September 14. Their second game was scheduled to be against Canada on September 15. Their final game of group play was against Brazil on September 16. Great Britain entered the tournament ranked number five in the world.

Group play

Pos	Team	Pld	W	D	L	GF	GA	GD	Pts	Qualification
1	Australia	3	3	0	0	188	158	+30	6	Semi-finals
2	Canada	3	2	0	1	174	160	+14	4	Semi-finals
3	Great Britain	3	1	0	2	152	135	+17	2	Fifth place Match
4	Brazil (H)	3	0	0	3	125	186	−61	0	Seventh place Match

Source: Rio2016
(H) Hosts
14 September 2016
10:30

Australia	53–51	Great Britain
	Report

Carioca Arena 1, Rio de Janeiro
Referee: Pierre-Alexandre Briere, Alexander Shriener

15 September 2016
12:45

Great Britain	49–50	Canada
	Report

Carioca Arena 1, Rio de Janeiro
Referee: Liam Costello, Mitch Carr

16 September 2016
12:45

Brazil	32–52	Great Britain
	Report

Carioca Arena 1, Rio de Janeiro
Referee: Alexander Schriener, Liam Costello

Classification 5–6

17 September 2016
19:15

Great Britain	56–42	Sweden
	Report

Carioca Arena 1, Rio de Janeiro
Referee: Lukasz Symczak

== Wheelchair tennis ==
Great Britain qualified for ten out of a possible eleven individual quotas in the wheelchair tennis events in Rio based on the ITF rankings as at 23 May 2016. On 28 June 2016, the British Paralympic Association confirmed the ten athletes who will represent Team GB in Rio.

Singles

Athlete (seed)	Event	Round of 64	Round of 32	Round of 16	Quarterfinals	Semifinals	Final / BM	
Athlete (seed)	Event	Opposition Score	Opposition Score	Opposition Score	Opposition Score	Opposition Score	Opposition Score	Rank
Alfie Hewett (13)	Men's singles	Borhan (MAS); W 6–0 6–1	Rajakaruna (SRI); W 6–1, 6–2	Peifer (FRA); W 7–6^{(7–4)}, 4–6, 6–3	Olsson (SWE); W 6–1, 2–6, 6–3	Gérard (BEL); W 7–5, 6–3	Reid (GBR); L 2–6, 1–6	2nd place, silver medalist(s)
Marc McCarroll	Men's singles	Mazzei (ITA); W 7–5, 6–3	Gérard (BEL); L 1–6, 4–6	Did not advance				
David Phillipson	Men's singles	Bedard (CAN); W 6–0, 6–1	Houdet (FRA); L 1–6, 2–6	Did not advance				
Gordon Reid (3)	Men's singles	Bye	Wallin (SWE); W 6–1, 6–2	Cattaneo (FRA); W 6–0, 6–2	Fernández (ARG); W 2–6, 7–6^{(7–4)}, 6–1	Houdet (FRA); W 7–5, 6–2	Hewett (GBR); W 6–2, 6–1	1st place, gold medalist(s)
Louise Hunt	Women's singles	—N/a	Mathewson (USA); L 1–6, 4–6	Did not advance				
Lucy Shuker	Women's singles	—N/a	Mardones (CHI); W 6–2, 6–0	Griffioen (NED); L 4–6, 1–6	Did not advance			
Jordanne Whiley MBE (3)	Women's singles	—N/a	Park (KOR); W 6–1, 6–2	Mayara (BRA); W 6–4, 6–1	de Groot (NED); L 3–6, 1–6	Did not advance		
Jamie Burdekin	Quad singles	—N/a		Silva (BRA); L 2–6, 6–2, 1–6	Did not advance			
Antony Cotterill	Quad singles	—N/a		Taylor (USA); L 3–6, 6–7^{(5–7)}	Did not advance			
Andy Lapthorne (4)	Quad singles	—N/a		Corradi (ITA); W 6–2, 6–3	Davidson (AUS); W 6–1, 6–2	Wagner (USA); W 6–3, 2–6, 6–3	Alcott (AUS); L 3–6, 4–6	2nd place, silver medalist(s)

Doubles

Athlete (seed)	Event	Round of 32	Round of 16	Quarterfinals	Semifinals	Final / BM	
Athlete (seed)	Event	Opposition Score	Opposition Score	Opposition Score	Opposition Score	Opposition Score	Rank
Alfie Hewett & Gordon Reid (2)	Men's doubles	Bye	Im / Lee (KOR); W 6–1, 6–2	Caverzaschi / de la Puente (ESP); W 6–2, 6–0	Kunieda / Saida (JPN); W 6–2, 6–4	Houdet / Peifer (FRA); L 2–6, 6–4, 1–6	2nd place, silver medalist(s)
Marc McCarroll & David Phillipson	Men's doubles	Dong / Wei (CHN); W 6–4, 7–6^{(7–3)}	Houdet / Peifer (FRA); L 0–6, 2–6	Did not advance			
Lucy Shuker & Jordanne Whiley MBE (3)	Women's doubles	—N/a	Bye	Cabrillana / Mardones (CHI); W 6–0, 6–0	Griffioen / van Koot (NED); L 3–6, 3–6	Kamiji / Nijo (JPN); W 6–3, 0–6, 6–1	3rd place, bronze medalist(s)
Jamie Burdekin & Andy Lapthorne (2)	Quad doubles	—N/a		Bye	Alcott / Davidson (AUS); L 1–6, 2–6	Erenlib / Weinberg (ISR); W 3–6, 6–4, 7–6^{(7–2)}	3rd place, bronze medalist(s)

== See also ==
- Great Britain at the 2016 Summer Olympics
