= Swimming at the 2022 Commonwealth Games – Women's 200 metre freestyle S14 =

Women's 200 metre freestyle S14 at the 2022 Commonwealth Games
- Venue: Sandwell Aquatics Centre
- Dates: 3 August 2022
- Competitors: 7 from 3 nations
- Winning time: 2:07.02

Medalists
gold medal	Bethany Firth	Northern Ireland
silver medal	Jessica-Jane Applegate	England
bronze medal	Louise Fiddes	England

The women's 200 metre freestyle S14 event at the 2022 Commonwealth Games was held on 3 August 2022 at the Sandwell Aquatics Centre.

== Schedule ==
The schedule is as follows:

All times are British Summer Time (UTC+1)

Date	Time	Round
Wednesday 3 August 2022	19:14	Final

== Results ==
=== Final ===
Rank	Lane	Name	Nationality	Time	Notes
1st place, gold medalist(s)	4	Bethany Firth	Northern Ireland	2:07.02	
2nd place, silver medalist(s)	5	Jessica-Jane Applegate	England	2:08.56	
3rd place, bronze medalist(s)	3	Louise Fiddes	England	2:11.22	
4	2	Poppy Maskill	England	2:13.54	
5	6	Madeleine McTernan	Australia	2:13.89	
6	7	Ruby Storm	Australia	2:15.75	
7	1	Jade Lucy	Australia	2:16.64	
