= Ian Sagar =

British wheelchair basketball player (born 1982)

Personal information
- Nationality: English
- Born: 29 March 1982 (age 44) Sheffield, England

Sport
- Country: Great Britain
- Sport: Wheelchair basketball

Ian Sagar (born 29 March 1982) is a British former wheelchair basketball player. He was selected to play for Team GB in the 2012 Summer Paralympics in London. He has a broken spinal cord.

== Personal life ==
Sagar was born in Sheffield, South Yorkshire, England. He currently lives in Barnsley, South Yorkshire. In 1999, he had a motorcycle accident, breaking his spinal cord. He is going to be a wheelchair user for his entire life, as he will not recover from breaking his spinal cord. He was interviewed by the journalist Alessandro Camagni, who told of his life in the book "Torneresti indietro?".

== Wheelchair basketball ==
Sagar began playing wheelchair basketball in 2006, when he was 24 years old. He was introduced to wheelchair basketball after he worked as a salesman for RGK, a manufacturer of sports wheelchairs. He first played for the Sheffield Steelers wheelchair basketball team at the age of 23, and played for three years. Sagar now plays for the Tameside Owls. Sagar also plays for a Spanish wheelchair basketball team in Toledo. He made his Great Britain debut in 2008.

Sagar played his first championship at the European Championships in Adana, Turkey in 2009. Along with his team, he finished in the bronze medal position, third place. In 2010 he played at the World Wheelchair Basketball Championships in Birmingham. He finished in fifth place, out of the medals. In 2011 he had his first success, at the 2011 European Championships in Nazareth, northern Israel. He finished in first place, winning gold, along with his team. He was picked for the Great British Team (Team GB) in the 2012 Summer Paralympics, held on home ground in London. He participated in the 2016 Summer Paralympics in Rio de Janeiro, winning the bronze medal against Turkey. He was chosen to be team captain for the 2020 Summer Paralympics, held in Tokyo, and finished in third place along with his team.

Sagar retired from wheelchair basketball on 22 May 2022 to devote himself to his family.
