= Jessica-Jane Applegate =

British Paralympic swimmer

Jessica-Jane Applegate MBE
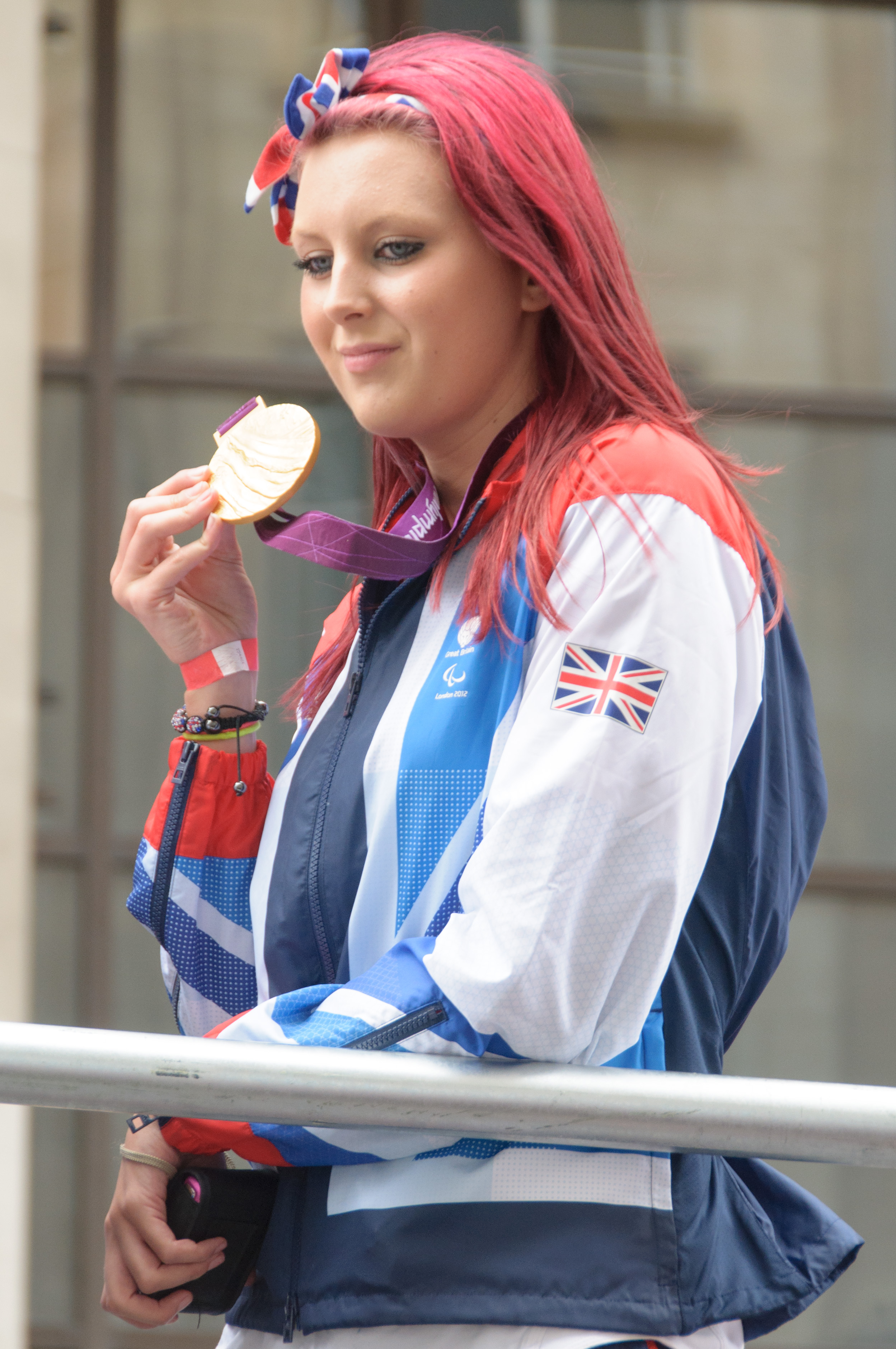
- Applegate with her gold medal in S14 200m Freestyle after the 2012 Summer Paralympics

Personal information
- Full name: Jessica-Jane Applegate
- Nationality: British
- Born: 22 August 1996 (age 29) Great Yarmouth, England

Sport
- Sport: Swimming
- Strokes: Freestyle, backstroke
- Club: City of Norwich Swimming Club
Medal record
Women's para swimming
Representing Great Britain
Paralympic Games
Gold medal – first place	2012 London	200m freestyle S14
Gold medal – first place	2020 Tokyo	mixed 4 × 100 m freestyle relay S14
Silver medal – second place	2016 Rio de Janeiro	200m freestyle S14
Silver medal – second place	2016 Rio de Janeiro	200m medley SM14
Bronze medal – third place	2016 Rio de Janeiro	100m backstroke S14
Bronze medal – third place	2020 Tokyo	200 m freestyle S14
Bronze medal – third place	2020 Tokyo	100 m backstroke S14
World Championships
Gold medal – first place	2013 Montreal	200m freestyle S14
Gold medal – first place	2015 Glasgow	100m backstroke S14
Gold medal – first place	2023 Manchester	200m freestyle S14
Silver medal – second place	2013 Montreal	200m medley SM14
Silver medal – second place	2015 Glasgow	200m freestyle S14
Silver medal – second place	2015 Glasgow	200m medley SM14
Silver medal – second place	2022 Madeira	200m freestyle S14
Silver medal – second place	2022 Madeira	200m ind. medley SM14
Bronze medal – third place	2013 Montreal	100m freestyle S14
Bronze medal – third place	2022 Madeira	100m backstroke S14
European Championships
Silver medal – second place	2014 Eindhoven	200m freestyle S14
Silver medal – second place	2016 Funchal	200 m freestyle S14
Silver medal – second place	2016 Funchal	100 m backstroke S14
Bronze medal – third place	2014 Eindhoven	100m backstroke S14
Bronze medal – third place	2014 Eindhoven	200m medley S14
Representing England
Commonwealth Games
Silver medal – second place	2022 Birmingham	200m freestyle S14

Jessica-Jane Applegate MBE (born 22 August 1996) is a retired British Paralympic swimmer. Applegate competed in the S14 classification for swimmers with intellectual disabilities, mainly freestyle and backstroke preferring shorter distances. She qualified for the 2012 Summer Paralympics and on 2 September, Applegate won the gold setting a Paralympic record in the S14 200m freestyle.

She was appointed Member of the Order of the British Empire (MBE) in the 2013 New Year Honours for services to swimming.

In December 2025, a year after not being selected to be on Team GB for the Paralympic Games, Applegate announced her retirement from competitive swimming.

== Early life ==
Applegate was born in 1996 in Great Yarmouth, Norfolk, England. She was diagnosed with autism spectrum disorder, and began swimming at a young age after her mother took her to Lowestoft and Oulton Broad Swimming Club. Educated at Ormiston Venture Academy, by the age of 13 she was setting regional records and was selected for a UK sporting talent programme.

== Swimming career ==
Towards the end of 2011, Applegate was showing potential as an International competitive swimmer, setting the second-fastest world Paralympic time in the 50m and the third fastest in the 200m freestyle at the Wales Winter Open. In 2012, she entered her first overseas tournament at the Berlin Open, taking two bronzes, in the 50m and 100m freestyle. Applegate then followed her success in Berlin by taking the gold in the 200m freestyle at the 2012 British Swimming Championship in March. In taking the gold she not only finished four seconds inside the Great Britain Paralympic qualifying time but also set a new British record.

Her last major meet before the Paralympics, the 2012 British International Disability Swimming Championships, saw Applegate win three medals. She took silver in the S14 50m and 100m freestyle races, and then on the last day of the tournament, in a very tight race against Ireland's Bethany Firth, she took gold with a time of 2:15.23. Her results over the prior tournaments saw Applegate qualify for the 2012 Summer Paralympics in both the S14 200m freestyle and 100m backstroke.

In the Paralympics, Applegate's first event was the 100m backstroke on 31 August. She qualified in third place in the heats and then swam a personal best of 1:09.58 in the final to finish just outside the medals in fourth place. In her favoured 200m freestyle, Applegate qualified for the final in first place with a time of 2:14.31. She then improved on this again in the final, coming from behind in the final length to win the gold medal and set a time of 2:12.63, a Paralympic record.

In 2013 Applegate again represented Great Britain when she travelled to Montreal to compete in the IPC World Championships. There she won three medals including a gold in the 200m freestyle. She also took silver in the 200m medley and bronze in the 100m freestyle.

Applegate represented Great Britain in the 2016 Paralympics in Rio where she won a silver in the women's 200m freestyle S14 and women's 200m individual medley SM14 and a bronze in the women's 100m backstroke S14.

She was selected for her third Paralympics when she was selected for the postponed 2020 Tokyo Paralympics in July 2021. In Tokyo, she won gold in the mixed 4 × 100 m freestyle relay S14 and bronze in the women's 200m freestyle S14 and 100m backstroke S14.

== See also ==
- 2012 Summer Olympics and Paralympics gold post boxes
