= Bethany Firth =

Paralympic swimmer from Northern Ireland

Bethany Firth OBE
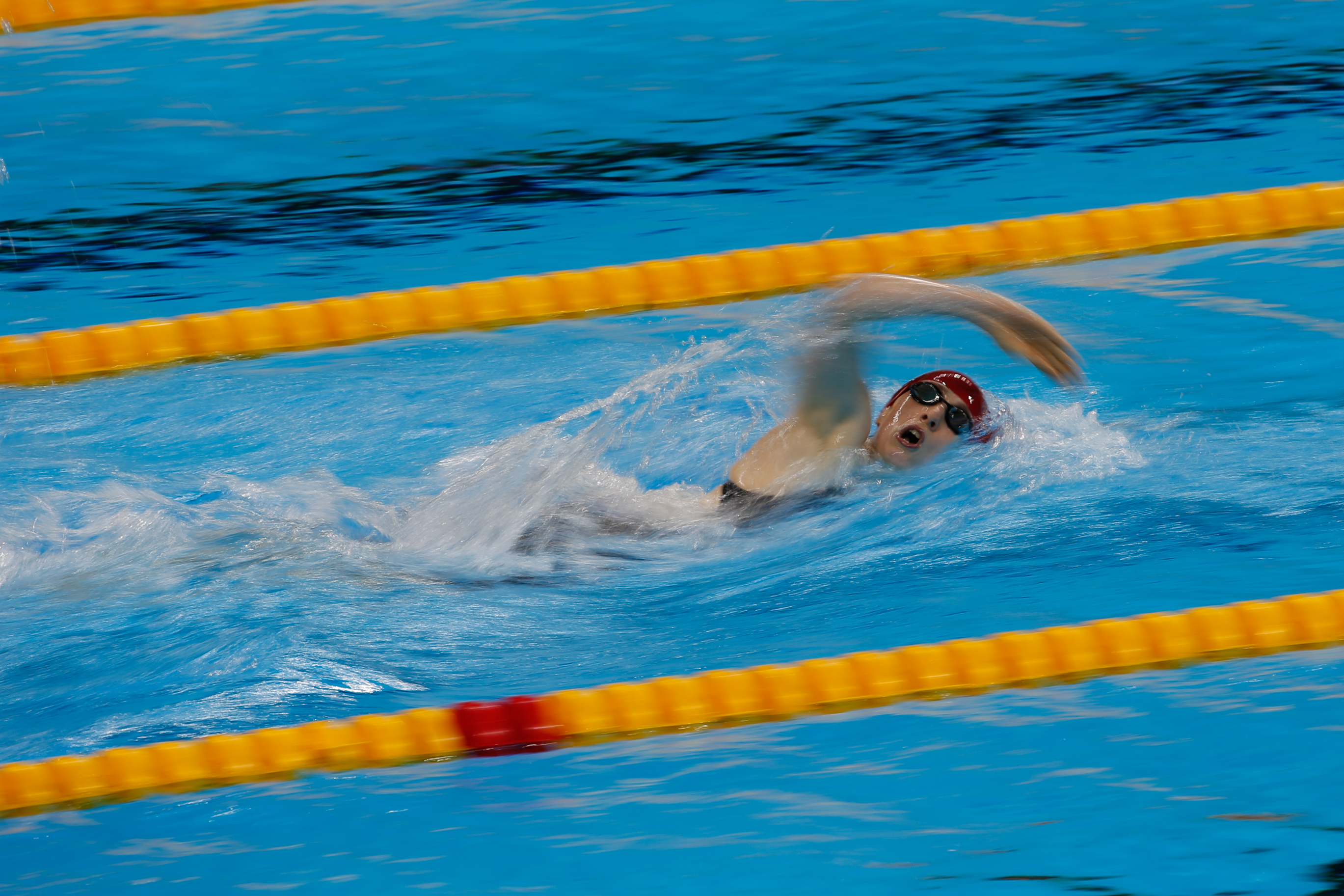
- Firth at the 2016 Paralympics

Personal information
- Nationality: British
- Born: 14 February 1996 (age 30)
- Height: 172 cm (5 ft 8 in)

Sport
- Sport: Para swimming
- Disability class: S14, SB14, SM14
- Club: Ards Swim Club
Medal record
Women's para swimming
Representing Great Britain
Paralympic Games
Gold medal – first place	2016 Rio de Janeiro	100 m backstroke S14
Gold medal – first place	2016 Rio de Janeiro	200 m freestyle S14
Gold medal – first place	2016 Rio de Janeiro	200 m medley SM14
Gold medal – first place	2020 Tokyo	100 m backstroke S14
Gold medal – first place	2020 Tokyo	mixed 4 × 100 m freestyle relay S14
Silver medal – second place	2016 Rio de Janeiro	100 m breaststroke SB14
Silver medal – second place	2020 Tokyo	200 m freestyle S14
Silver medal – second place	2020 Tokyo	200 m medley SM14
World Championships
Gold medal – first place	2022 Madeira	200 m freestyle S14
Gold medal – first place	2022 Madeira	100 m backstroke S14
Gold medal – first place	2022 Madeira	200 m medley SM14
Gold medal – first place	2023 Manchester	100 m backstroke S14
Gold medal – first place	2025 Singapore	Mixed 4x100m medley SM14
Gold medal – first place	2023 Manchester	200 m medley SM14
Silver medal – second place	2023 Manchester	200 m freestyle S14
Silver medal – second place	2025 Singapore	100 m backstroke S14
Bronze medal – third place	2023 Manchester	100 m butterfly S14
Bronze medal – third place	2025 Singapore	200 m medley SM14
European Championships
Silver medal – second place	2016 Funchal	100 m breaststroke SB14
Silver medal – second place	2016 Funchal	200 m medley SM14
Representing Ireland
Paralympic Games
Gold medal – first place	2012 London	100 m backstroke S14
World Championships
Silver medal – second place	2013 Montreal	200 m freestyle S14
Silver medal – second place	2013 Montreal	100 m backstroke S14
Silver medal – second place	2013 Montreal	100 m breaststroke SB14
Representing Northern Ireland
Commonwealth Games
Gold medal – first place	2022 Birmingham	200 m freestyle S14
Bronze medal – third place	2026 Glasgow	200 m freestyle S14

Bethany Charlotte Firth (born 14 February 1996) is a Northern Irish Paralympic swimmer. Since 2014 she has competed for Great Britain; previously, Firth had represented Ireland. A six time Paralympic gold medalist, she has won gold in her specialist event - the 100 metres backstroke - for both Ireland at the 2012 Summer Paralympics and Great Britain at the 2016 and 2020 Summer Paralympics. These were in addition to the Mixed 4 x 100 metres freestyle relay S14 at the 2020 Games, and 200 metres medley and 200 metres freestyle for Great Britain at the 2016 Games, where she was the nation's most successful Paralympian with three golds and a silver medal. She competes in the S14 classification for athletes with an intellectual impairment.

== Personal life ==
Bethany Charlotte Firth was born on 14 February 1996 in Seaforde, County Down, Northern Ireland. Her father Peter is a teacher and former church minister, and her mother Lindsey is a nurse practitioner. She is a Christian and is a member of Comber Baptist Church. Firth was educated at Longstone School in Dundonald.

Firth has a learning difficulty that causes short term memory loss. She therefore competes in the S14 classification.

== Swimming career ==
On 31 August 2012, Firth, competing for Ireland in her first Paralympics, won a gold medal at the 2012 Paralympic games in London in the S14 100 metres backstroke final while representing Ireland. Firth, who has learning difficulties, had been swimming for only three years.

Firth won three silver medals at the 2013 IPC Swimming World Championships.

Later in the same year she announced her intention to switch national team and swim for Team GB instead of Ireland after serving a period out of competition, as "Team GB has other S14 swimmers – who have learning disabilities – with whom she can relate." The following year she represented Northern Ireland in the 2014 Commonwealth Games, competing in seven events against non-disabled athletes.

In March 2015 Firth broke the world record for the S14 100m breaststroke in qualifying for that year's IPC World Championships. Firth failed to compete in the World Championships after suffering a fractured wrist in training just a few days before the competition.

On 26 April 2016, in the qualifiers for the 2016 Summer Paralympics in Rio, Firth set a new world record in the S14 200 metres freestyle. Competing at the British Para-International meet in Glasgow, she recorded a time of 2:03.70.

On 8 September 2016, Firth defended the title that she had won in 2012 in the S14 100m backstroke, for the 2016 Summer Paralympics at Rio de Janeiro. She did this, winning in a world record time of 1:04.05 whilst competing for Paralympics GB. She also won gold in the women's 200m freestyle S14, and the women's 200m individual medley SM14, and silver in the women's 100m breaststroke SB14.

At the 2020 Tokyo Paralympics, Firth defended her title in the 100m backstroke S14 and also won gold in the mixed 4 x 100m freestyle relay S14. In addition, she took silver in the women's 200m freestyle S14 and women's 200m individual medley SM14.

Firth was appointed Member of the Order of the British Empire (MBE) in the 2017 New Year Honours for services to swimming and promoted to Officer of the Order of the British Empire (OBE) in the 2022 New Year Honours, also for services to swimming.

She has also received an honorary doctorate from Queen's University Belfast in 2017.

In September 2025, at the World Para Swimming Championships in Singapore, Firth won the silver medal in the Women's S14 100 metre backstroke as part of a British clean sweep of the podium, alongside Poppy Maskill (gold) and Georgia Sheffield (bronze).

== Recognition ==
She was recognized as one of the BBC's 100 women of 2019.

== See also ==
- Ireland at the 2012 Summer Paralympics
- 2012 Summer Olympics and Paralympics gold post boxes
