= Leslie Cichocki =

American Paralympic swimmer

Personal information
- Nickname: Motorboat
- Born: 28 December 1988 (age 37) Oak Lawn, Illinois, United States
- Height: 5 ft 9 in (175 cm)
- Weight: 135 lb (61 kg)

Sport
- Country: United States
- Sport: Paralympic swimming
- Disability: Intellectual impairment
- Disability class: S14, SB14, SM14
- Club: Tucson Ford Dealers Aquatics
Medal record
Paralympic swimming
Representing United States
INAS Global Games
Silver medal – second place	2015 Guayaquil	Women's 50m backstroke
Silver medal – second place	2015 Guayaquil	Women's 50m freestyle
Silver medal – second place	2015 Guayaquil	Women's 200m individual medley
Bronze medal – third place	2015 Guayaquil	Women's 100m backstroke
Bronze medal – third place	2015 Guayaquil	Women's 4x50m medley relay
Bronze medal – third place	2015 Guayaquil	Women's 4x200m freestyle relay
Bronze medal – third place	2019 Brisbane	Women's 400m freestyle
World Championships
Silver medal – second place	2017 Aguascalientes	Women's 100m backstroke
Silver medal – second place	2017 Aguascalientes	Women's 100m butterfly
Silver medal – second place	2017 Aguascalientes	Women's 100m freestyle
Silver medal – second place	2017 Aguascalientes	Women's 200m freestyle
Bronze medal – third place	2017 Aguascalientes	Women's 50m backstroke
Bronze medal – third place	2017 Aguascalientes	Women's 50m freestyle
Bronze medal – third place	2017 Aguascalientes	Women's 200m butterfly
Bronze medal – third place	2017 Aguascalientes	Women's 400m freestyle
Parapan American Games
Silver medal – second place	2019 Lima	Women's 100m butterfly S14
Bronze medal – third place	2015 Toronto	Women's 200m freestyle S14
Bronze medal – third place	2019 Lima	Women's 100m backstroke S14

Leslie Cichocki (born 28 December 1988) is an American Paralympic swimmer who competes in international level events. She was the United States' first intellectually impaired swimmer to participate in the Summer Paralympics when she was selected for the United States' 2016 Summer Paralympics team.
