= Michelle Franssen =

Belgian Paralympic swimmer

Personal information
- Born: 14 December 1994 (age 30); Overpelt, Belgium
- Home town: Peer, Belgium
- Height: 1.63 m (5 ft 4 in)
- Weight: 58 kg (128 lb)

Sport
- Country: Belgium
- Sport: Paralympic swimming
- Disability: Autism
- Disability class: S14, SB14, SM14
- Club: Royal Ostend Swimming Club
- Partner: Maarten Libin
- Coached by: Gregory Planckaert

Michelle Franssen (born 14 December 1994) is a Belgian Paralympic swimmer who competes in international level events. She was a finalist in three of her events at the 2016 Summer Paralympics.
