= Michelle Alonso =

Spanish Paralympic swimmer

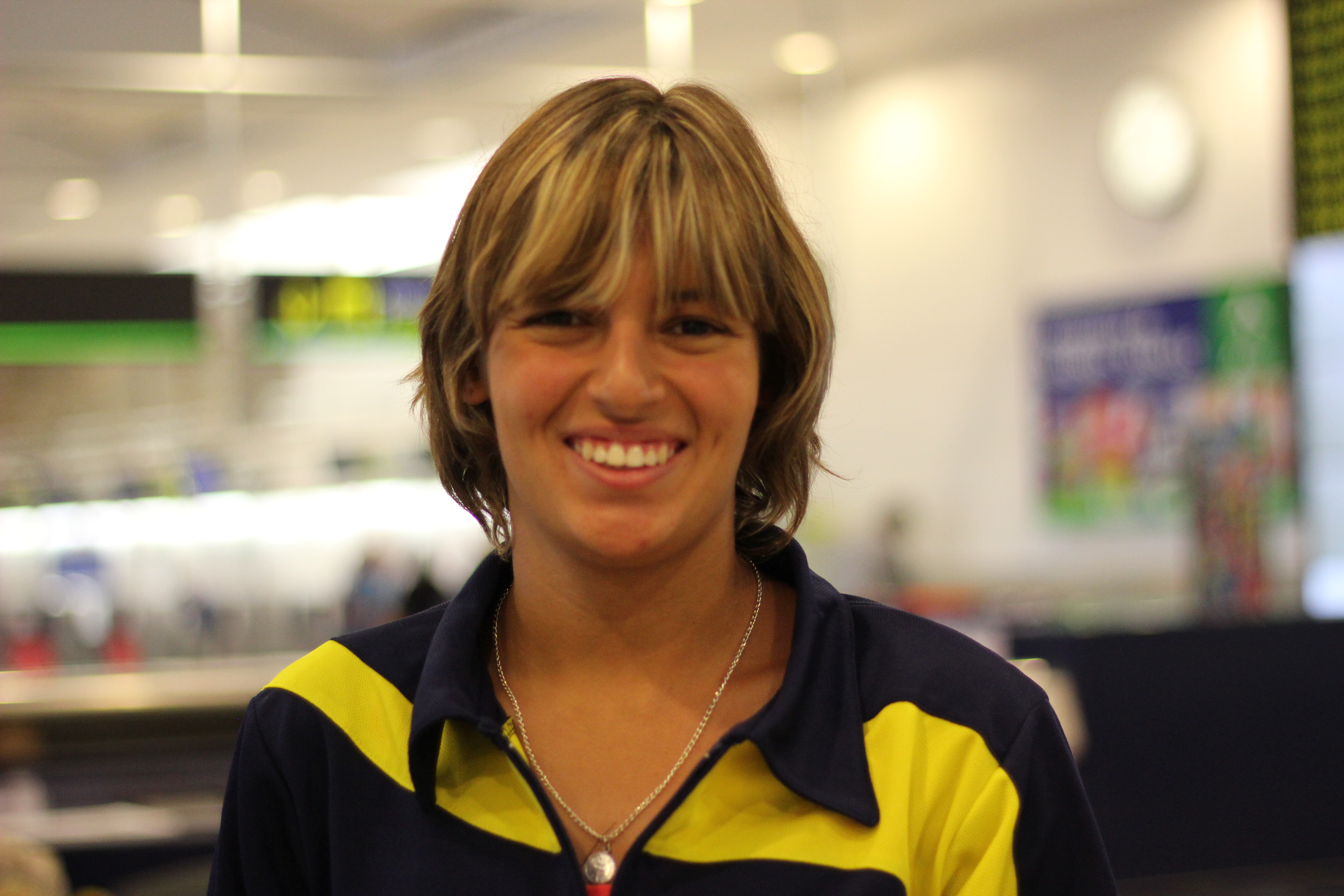

Personal information
- Full name: Michelle Alonso Morales
- Nationality: Spain
- Born: 29 March 1994 (age 32) Tenerife, Canary Islands, Spain

Sport
- Sport: Swimming
Medal record
Women's para swimming
Representing Spain
Paralympic Games
Gold medal – first place	2012 London	100m breaststroke SB14
Gold medal – first place	2016 Rio de Janeiro	100m breaststroke SB14
Gold medal – first place	2020 Tokyo	100m breaststroke SB14
World Championships
Gold medal – first place	2013 Montreal	100m breaststroke SB14
Gold medal – first place	2022 Madeira	100m breaststroke SB14
Bronze medal – third place	2015 Glasgow	100m breaststroke SB14
IPC European Championships
Gold medal – first place	2014 Eindhoven	100m breaststroke SB14
Gold medal – first place	2016 Funchal	100 m breaststroke SB14
Bronze medal – third place	2016 Funchal	200 m freestyle S14

Michelle Alonso Morales (born 29 March 1994, in Tenerife) is a swimmer competitor from Spain. She has been dubbed by the media as "The Little Mermaid of the Canary Islands". She is also considered one of the most important personalities of Spanish sport.

== Personal ==
Alonso was born 29 March 1994 and has an intellectual disability. She is from the Canary Islands. As of 2012, she lived in Tenerife. In October 2013, she was awarded the gold Real Orden al Mérito Deportivo at a ceremony at the Teatro de Madrid Cofidis, and attended by Princess Elena, Minister of Education, Culture and Sport, José Ignacio Wert, the president of the Higher Sports Council (CSD), Miguel Cardinal, and the Director General of Sports of CSD, Ana Muñoz.

== Swimming ==
Alonso is an S14 classified swimmer. She is affiliated with the Spanish Sports Federation for Persons with Intellectual Disability (FEddi).

In 2010, Alonso competed at the Tenerife International Open.

In 2012 Alonso competed at the Paralympic Swimming Championship of Spain by Autonomous Communities.

She raced at the 2012 Summer Paralympics in London, England where she earned a gold medal in the 100 metre breaststroke setting a new world record of 1:16.85. She competed at the 2013 IPC Swimming World Championships, where she won a gold medal in her favoured 100m breaststroke. The next year she again represented Spain, this time in the 2014 IPC Swimming European Championships. She entered four events, winning gold in the 100m breaststroke S14 breaking her own world record, set at the Paralympics, by over a second. She broke her own world record again at the 2020 Summer Paralympics, with a time of 1:12:02.

During the Tokyo 2020 Paralympic Games, Michelle led the Spanish delegation at the opening ceremony carrying the flag of Spain.
