= Janina Breuer =

German Paralympic swimmer

Personal information
- Nickname: Nina
- Born: 16 November 1998 (age 27) Aachen, Germany
- Home town: Karlsruhe, Germany

Sport
- Country: Germany
- Sport: Paralympic swimming
- Disability: Intellectual impairment
- Disability class: S14, SB14, SM14
- Club: Berliner Schwimmteam
- Coached by: Phillip Semechin; Ute Schinkitz
Medal record
Paralympic swimming
Representing Germany
World Championships
Gold medal – first place	2017 Mexico City	Women's 100m backstroke S14
Gold medal – first place	2017 Mexico City	Women's 100m butterfly S14
Silver medal – second place	2017 Mexico City	Women's 200m freestyle S14
Silver medal – second place	2017 Mexico City	Women's 200m individual medley SM14
European Championships
Bronze medal – third place	2016 Funchal	Women's 100m backstroke S14

Janina Breuer (born 16 November 1998) is a German Paralympic swimmer. She is a double World champion and was the youngest member of the German team at the 2016 Summer Paralympics.
