= Pernilla Lindberg (swimmer) =

Swedish Paralympic swimmer

Personal information
- Nickname: Pippi
- Born: 7 May 1994 (age 32) Gothenburg, Sweden
- Home town: Gothenburg, Sweden
- Height: 1.74 m (5 ft 9 in)

Sport
- Country: Sweden
- Sport: Para swimming
- Disability class: S14
- Club: Simklubben S02
- Coached by: Joachim Bratt; Roger Lindberg
Medal record
Para swimming
Representing Sweden
INAS Global Games
Gold medal – first place	2019 Brisbane	Women's 100m freestyle
Silver medal – second place	2019 Brisbane	Women's 200m freestyle
Silver medal – second place	2019 Brisbane	Women's 400m freestyle
Silver medal – second place	2019 Brisbane	Women's 800m freestyle
World Championships
Gold medal – first place	2017 Mexico City	Women's 200m freestyle S14
Gold medal – first place	2017 Mexico City	Women's 200m individual medley SM14
Silver medal – second place	2017 Mexico City	Women's 100m butterfly S14
Bronze medal – third place	2017 Mexico City	Women's 100m backstroke S14
Bronze medal – third place	2017 Mexico City	Women's 100m breaststroke SB14

Pernilla Lindberg (born 7 May 1994) is a Swedish Paralympic swimmer who competes mainly in freestyle swimming events in international level events. She competed at the 2016 Summer Paralympics, and 2020 Summer Paralympics.

She competed at the 2019 INAS Global Games.
