= Australia at the 2020 Summer Paralympics =

- IPC code: AUS
- NPC: Paralympics Australia
- Website: www.paralympic.org.au

in Tokyo
- Competitors: 179 in 18 sports
- Flag bearers: Opening - Ryley Batt and Daniela di Toro; Closing - Ellie Cole
- Medals Ranked 8th: Gold 21 Silver 29 Bronze 30 Total 80

Summer Paralympics appearances (overview)
- 1960; 1964; 1968; 1972; 1976; 1980; 1984; 1988; 1992; 1996; 2000; 2004; 2008; 2012; 2016; 2020; 2024

Australia participated at the 2020 Summer Paralympics in Tokyo, Japan, from 24 August to 5 September 2021. It sent its largest away team - 179 athletes to a Summer Paralympics. Australia finished eighth on the gold medal table and sixth on the total medals table.

In May 2017, Paralympics Australia announced Kate McLoughlin as the Chef de Mission, McLoughlin held the position at the 2016 Rio Paralympics.

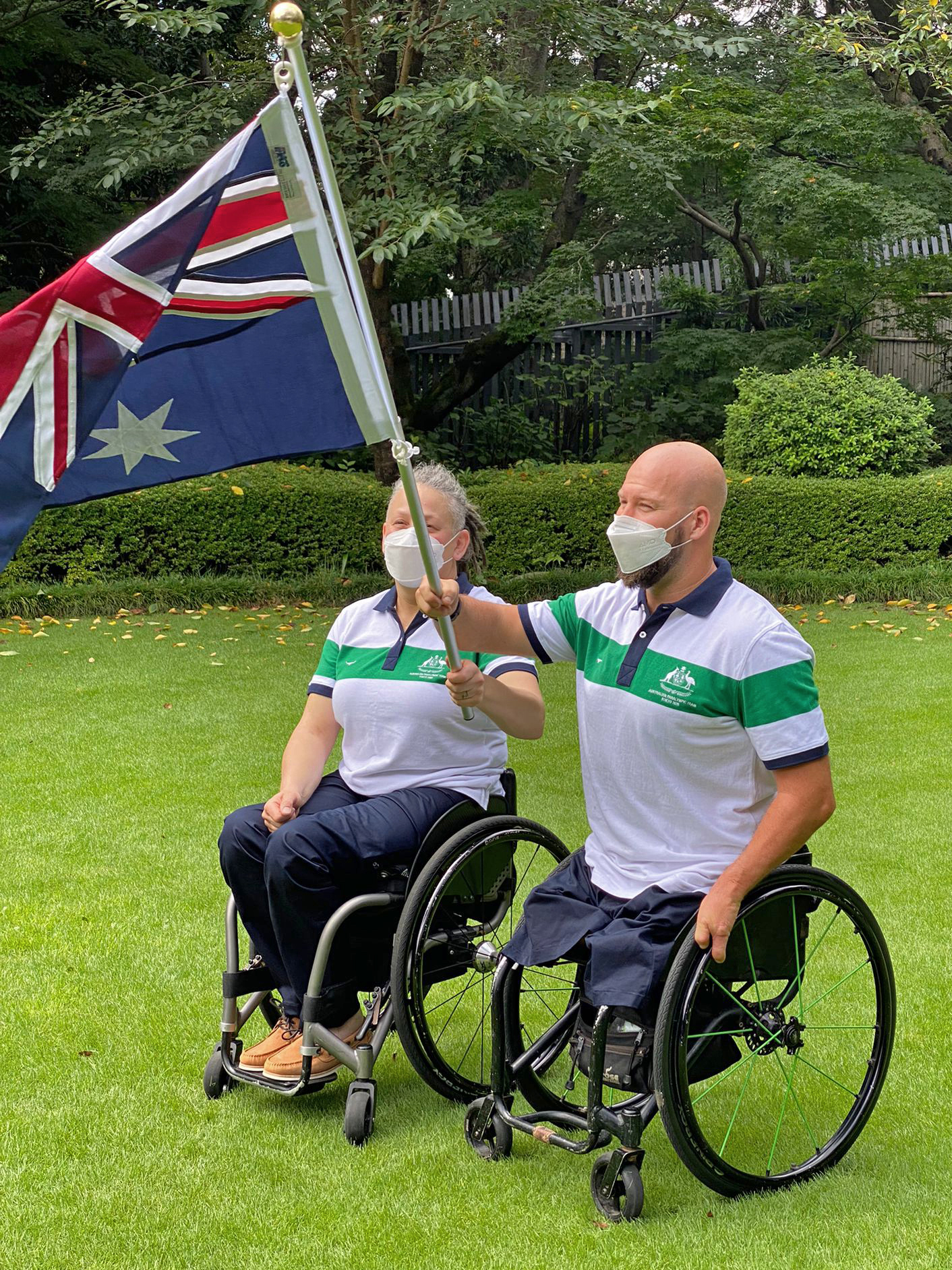
Daniela di Toro and Ryley Batt at the announcement that they would jointly carry the Australian flag in the opening ceremony at the Tokyo Paralympics.

In November 2019, wheelchair rugby player Ryley Batt and table tennis player Daniela di Toro, were named as co-captains. They were also named as joint flag bearers at the Opening Ceremony. Ellie Cole was the flag bearer at the Closing Ceremony. Cole became Australia's most decorated female Paralympian during the Games with her silver and bronze medals in swimming taking her to 17 Paralympic medals.

Notable achievements at the Games:

- Multiple gold medallists: William Martin (swimming) - 3 gold, 1 silver; Madison de Rozario (athletics) - 2 gold, 1 bronze; Curtis McGrath (canoeing) - 2 gold; Ben Popham (swimming) - 2 gold, 1 silver; Rowan Crothers (swimming) - 2 gold, 1 silver.
- Ellie Cole with two bronze medals became Australia's leading female Paralympic medallist with 17 medals - 6 gold, 5 silver, 6 bronze.
- Gold medallists repeating Rio Paralympics gold - James Turner (athletics), Vanessa Low (athletics), Curtis McGrath (canoeing), Lakeisha Patterson (swimming), Rachael Watson (swimming), Dylan Alcott (wheelchair tennis).
- First time Paralympic gold medallists - Madison de Rozario (athletics), Paige Greco (cycling), Emily Petricola (cycling), Amanda Reid (cycling), Darren Hicks (cycling), William Martin (swimming), Rowan Crothers (swimming), Ben Popham (swimming), Benjamin Hance (swimming)
- New sports - Janine Watson won Australia's first medal - bronze in Para Taekwondo.
- Boccia won it first medal since 1996 and second only medal with Daniel Michel's bronze medal.
- Table tennis had its greatest medal success at a Paralympics - 2 gold and 4 silver medals.

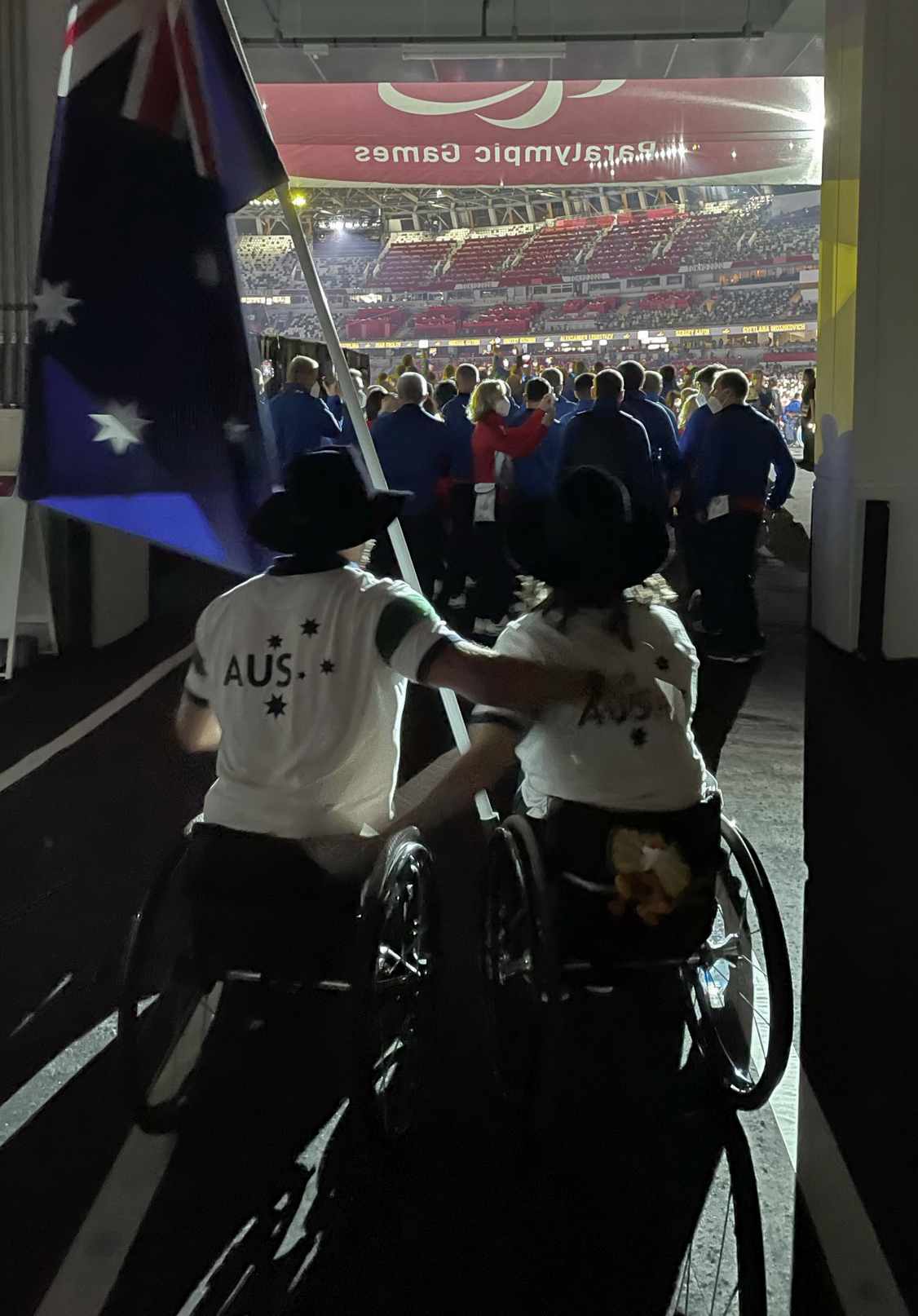
Australian team joint flagbearers Ryley Batt (left) and Daniela di Toro, just prior to entering the stadium for the parade of athletes during the opening ceremony.

== Medallists ==
Medal	Name	Sport	Event	Date
Gold	Paige Greco	Cycling	Women's individual pursuit C1–3	25 August
Gold	Emily Petricola	Cycling	Women's individual pursuit C4	25 August
Gold	William Martin	Swimming	Men's 400 metre freestyle S9	25 August
Gold	Lakeisha Patterson	Swimming	Women's 400 metre freestyle S9	25 August
Gold	Rowan Crothers	Swimming	Men's 50 metre freestyle S10	25 August
Gold	Ben Popham	Swimming	Men's 100 metre freestyle S8	25 August
Gold	Amanda Reid	Cycling	Women's time trial C1–3	27 August
Gold	Madison de Rozario	Athletics	Women's 800 metres T53	29 August
Gold	Lei Lina	Table tennis	Women's individual – Class 9	30 August
Gold	Qian Yang	Table tennis	Women's individual – Class 10	30 August
Gold	Rowan Crothers; William Martin; Matthew Levy; Ben Popham	Swimming	Men's 4 x 100 metre freestyle relay	30 August
Gold	Darren Hicks	Cycling	Men's road time trial C2	31 August
Gold	James Turner	Athletics	Men's 400 metres T36	31 August
Gold	William Martin	Swimming	Men's 100 metre butterfly S9	2 September
Gold	Benjamin Hance	Swimming	Men's 100 metre backstroke S14	2 September
Gold	Rachael Watson	Swimming	Women's 50 metre freestyle S4	2 September
Gold	Vanessa Low	Athletics	Women's long jump T63	2 September
Gold	Curtis McGrath	Paracanoeing	Men's KL2	3 September
Gold	Dylan Alcott	Wheelchair tennis	Quad singles	4 September
Gold	Curtis McGrath	Paracanoeing	Men's VL3	4 September
Gold	Madison de Rozario	Athletics	Women's marathon T54	5 September
Silver	Paige Leonhardt	Swimming	Women's 100 metre butterfly S14	25 August
Silver	Darren Hicks	Cycling	Men's individual pursuit C2	26 August
Silver	Isis Holt	Athletics	Women's 100 metres T35	27 August
Silver	Alistair Donohoe	Cycling	Men's individual pursuit C5	27 August
Silver	Jaryd Clifford	Athletics	Men's 5000 metres T13	28 August
Silver	Rowan Crothers	Swimming	Men's 100 metre freestyle S10	28 August
Silver	Ahmed Kelly	Swimming	Men's 150 metre individual medley SM3	28 August
Silver	Ricky Betar; Benjamin Hance; Ruby Storm; Madeleine McTernan	Swimming	Mixed 4 x 100 m freestyle S14	28 August
Silver	Ma Lin	Table tennis	Men's individual class 9	28 August
Silver	Lauren Parker	Paratriathlon	Women's PTWC	29 August
Silver	Erik Horrie	Rowing	Men's single sculls	29 August
Silver	Samuel von Einem	Table tennis	Men's individual class 11	29 August
Silver	Jake Michel	Swimming	Men's 100 metre breaststroke SB14	29 August
Silver	Ellie Cole; Isabella Vincent; Emily Beecroft; Ashleigh McConnell	Swimming	Women's 34pts 4x100m Freestyle	29 August
Silver	Isis Holt	Athletics	Women's 200 metres T35	29 August
Silver	Rheed McCracken	Athletics	Men's 100 metres T34	30 August
Silver	Michal Burian	Athletics	Men's javelin throw F64	30 August
Silver	Emily Petricola	Cycling	Women's road time trial C4	31 August
Silver	Carol Cooke	Cycling	Women's road time trial T1–2	31 August
Silver	Grant Patterson	Swimming	Men's 50 metre breaststroke SB2	31 August
Silver	Jasmine Greenwood	Swimming	Women's 100 metre butterfly S10	31 August
Silver	Timothy Hodge	Swimming	Men's 200 metre individual SM9	1 September
Silver	Dylan Alcott; Heath Davidson	Wheelchair tennis	Quad doubles	1 September
Silver	Susan Seipel	Paracanoeing	Women's VL2	3 September
Silver	Yang Qian; Lei Lina; Melissa Tapper	Table tennis	Women's team class 9–10	3 September
Silver	Ma Lin; Joel Coughlan; Nathan Pellissier	Table tennis	Men's team class 9–10	3 September
Silver	Timothy Hodge; Timothy Disken; William Martin; Ben Popham; Blake Cochrane^{[a]}	Swimming	Men's 4 x 100 m medley relay	3 September
Silver	James Turner	Athletics	Men's 100 metres T36	4 September
Silver	Jaryd Clifford	Athletics	Men's marathon T12	5 September
Bronze	Alexander Tuckfield	Swimming	Men's 400 metre freestyle S9	25 August
Bronze	Benjamin Hance	Swimming	Men's 100 metre butterfly S14	25 August
Bronze	Ruby Storm	Swimming	Women's 100 metre butterfly S14	25 August
Bronze	Keira Stephens	Swimming	Women's 100 metre breastroke SB9	26 August
Bronze	Katja Dedekind	Swimming	Women's 100 metre backstroke S13	26 August
Bronze	David Nicholas	Cycling	Men's individual pursuit C3	26 August
Bronze	Tiffany Thomas Kane	Swimming	Women's 200 metre individual medley SM7	27 August
Bronze	Katja Dedekind	Swimming	Women's 400 metre freestyle S13	27 August
Bronze	Matthew Levy	Swimming	Men's 100 metre breaststroke SB6	28 August
Bronze	Grant Patterson	Swimming	Men's 150 metre individual medley SM3	28 August
Bronze	Evan O'Hanlon	Athletics	Men's 100 metres T38	28 August
Bronze	Robyn Lambird	Athletics	Women's 100 metres T34	29 August
Bronze	Sarah Edmiston	Athletics	Women's discus throw F64	29 August
Bronze	Timothy Hodge	Swimming	Men's 100 metre backstroke S9	30 August
Bronze	Meg Lemon	Cycling	Women's road time trial C4	31 August
Bronze	Paige Greco	Cycling	Women's road time trial C1–3	31 August
Bronze	Jaryd Clifford	Athletics	Men's 1500 metres T13	31 August
Bronze	Alistair Donohoe	Cycling	Men's road time trial C5	31 August
Bronze	Col Pearse	Swimming	Men's 100 metre butterfly S10	31 August
Bronze	Madison de Rozario	Athletics	Women's 1500 metres T54	31 August
Bronze	Daniel Michel	Boccia	Mixed individual BC3	1 September
Bronze	Blake Cochrane	Swimming	Men's 100 metre breaststroke SB7	1 September
Bronze	Tiffany Thomas Kane	Swimming	Women's 100 metre breaststroke SB7	1 September
Bronze	Thomas Gallagher	Swimming	Men's 400 metre freestyle S10	1 September
Bronze	Ellie Cole; Keira Stephens; Emily Beecroft; Isabella Vincent	Swimming	Women's 4 x 100 metre medley relay	2 September
Bronze	Maria Strong	Athletics	Women's shot put F33	2 September
Bronze	Paige Greco	Cycling	Women's road race C1–3	3 September
Bronze	Deon Kenzie	Athletics	Men's 1500 metres T38	4 September
Bronze	Nicholas Hum	Athletics	Men's long jump T20	4 September
Bronze	Janine Watson	Taekwondo	Women's +58 kg	4 September

=== Medals by sport ===
Medals by sport
Sport	Gold medal	Silver medal	Bronze medal	Total
Athletics	4	7	8	19
Boccia	0	0	1	1
Cycling	4	4	5	13
Swimming	8	10	15	33
Paracanoeing	2	1	0	3
Paratriathlon	0	1	0	1
Rowing	0	1	0	1
Table Tennis	2	4	0	6
Taekwondo	0	0	1	1
Wheelchair tennis	1	1	0	2
Total	21	29	30	80

=== Medals by date ===
Medals by date
Day	Date	Gold medal	Silver medal	Bronze medal	Total
1	25 Aug	6	1	3	10
2	26 Aug	0	1	3	4
3	27 Aug	1	2	2	5
4	28 Aug	0	5	3	8
5	29 Aug	1	6	2	9
6	30 Aug	3	2	1	6
7	31 Aug	2	4	6	12
8	1 Sept	0	2	4	6
9	2 Sept	4	0	2	6
10	3 Sept	1	4	1	6
11	4 Sept	2	1	3	6
12	5 Sept	1	1	0	2
Total		21	29	30	80

=== Medals by gender ===
Medals by gender^{(Comparison graphs)}
Gender	Gold medal	Silver medal	Bronze medal	Total	Percentage
Female	10	10	15	35	43.8%
Male	11	18	15	44	55.0%
Mixed	0	1	0	1	1.3%
Total	21	29	30	80	100%

== Funding ==
Sport Australia provided funding to Paralympics Australia – $3,735,548 (2016/17), $5,019,780 (2017/18), $13,578,880 (2018/19), $8,634,280 (2019/20). The 2021/22 Australian Government budget provided $3.5 million due to increased operational costs for the Australian Paralympic Team's participation in the Tokyo Paralympic Games due to the impact of COVID-19. Sport Australia also provides funding to national sports organisations to support their Paralympic athletes. The breakdown of this funding is not available.

Prime Minister Scott Morrison announced in Parliament on 2 September 2021 that the Australian Government would finance equivalent payments to Australian Paralympic medallists to that provided by the Australian Olympic Committee to Olympic medallists - $20,000 cash bonus for Olympic gold medallists, while silver medallists and bronze medallists take home $15,000 and $10,000.

== COVID-19 ==
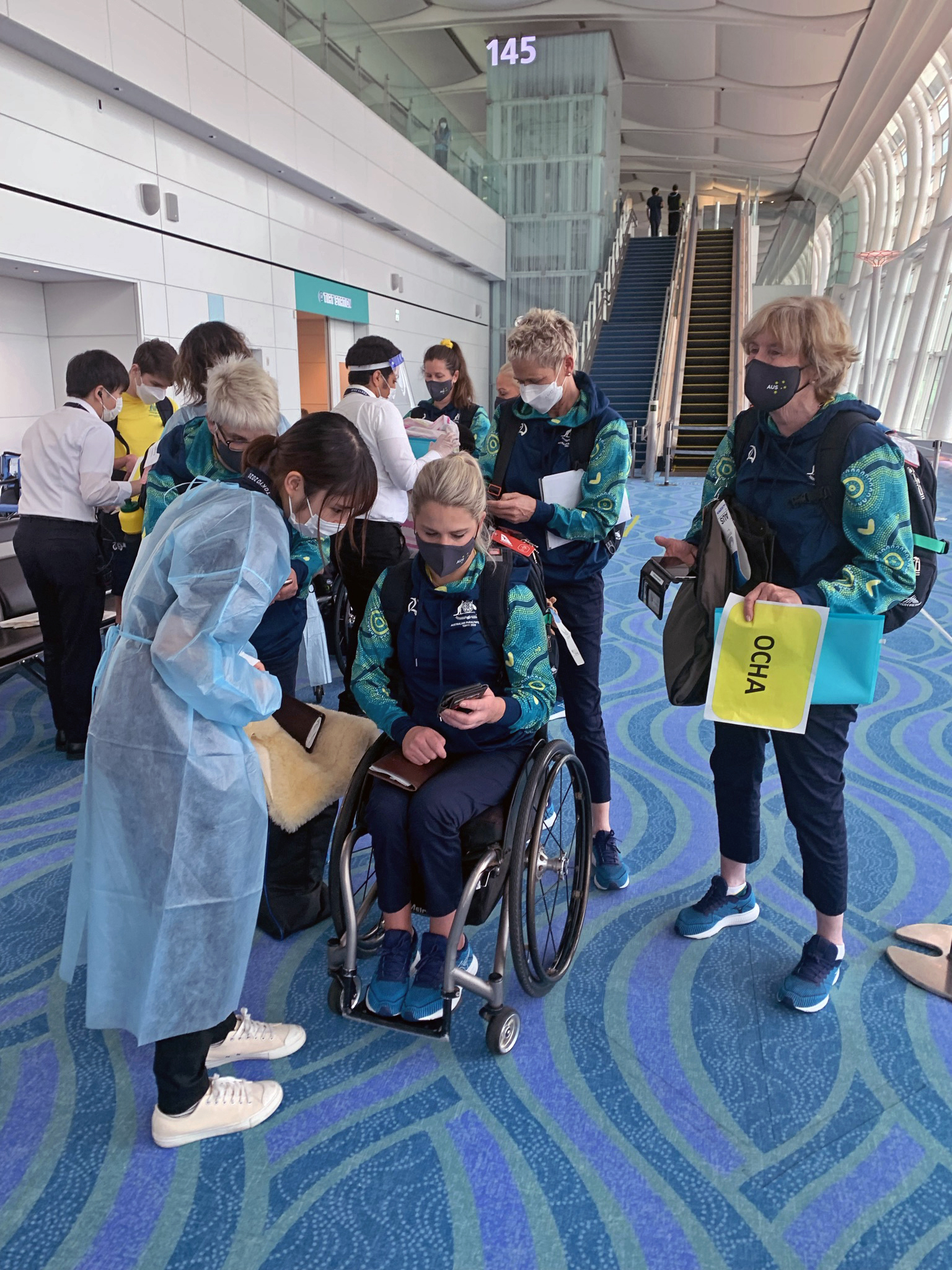
Australian Paralympic team members are checked on arrival at the airport in Tokyo for the Tokyo Paralympics.

Paralympics Australia required all Australian athletes and officials to have a COVID-19 vaccination to be considered for selection, whereas the Australian Olympic Committee and the International Paralympic Committee only strongly recommended the vaccine for those travelling to Tokyo. Paralympics Australia stated "This underpins PA's duty of care and the responsibility to do everything in our power to keep each and every team member safe for the duration of our stay in Tokyo and our journey home again."

== Competitors ==
Sport	Men	Women	Total
Archery	3	1	4
Athletics	23	15	38 (Note: Robyn Lambird and Maria "Maz" Strong are non-binary and are competing in women's athletics for Team Australia)
Badminton	1	1	2
Boccia	2	1	3
Canoeing	2	2	4
Cycling	7	5	12
Equestrian	0	4	4
Goalball	0	6	6
Judo	1	0	1
Rowing	4	4	8
Shooting	2	1	3
Swimming	19	15	34
Table tennis	6	5	11
Taekwondo	0	1	1
Triathlon	4	4	8
Wheelchair Basketball	12	12	24
Wheelchair Rugby	11	1	12
Wheelchair Tennis	4	0	4
Total	101	78	179

Please note that guides in athletics and paratriathlon and cox in rowing are counted as athletes at the Paralympics by Paralympics Australia.

== Archery ==
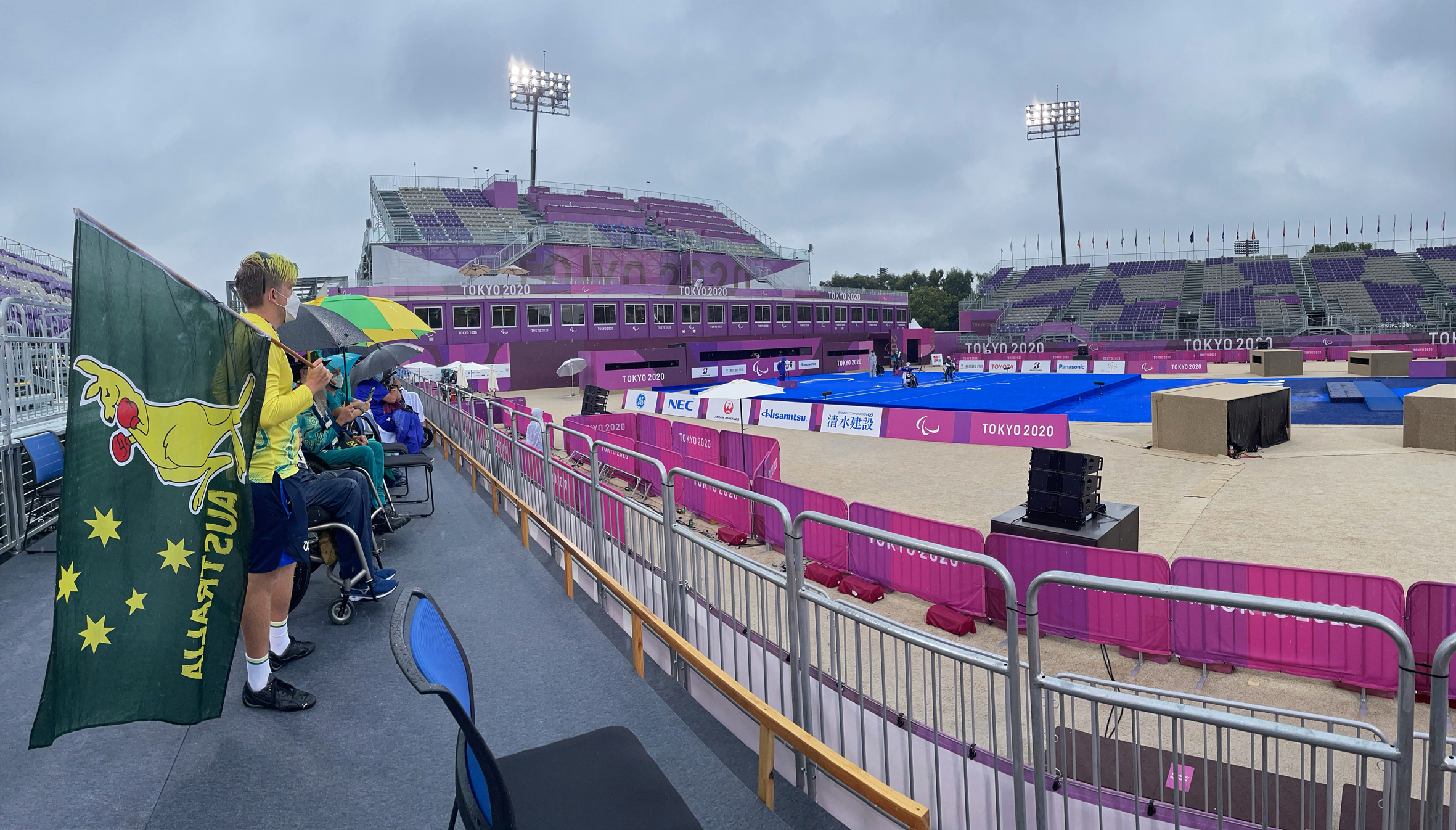
Australian archer Taymon Kenton-Smith and other members of the archery team support a teammate during competition.

Team of four archers selected on 26 July 2021. Men – Jonathon Milne, Peter Marchant, Taymon Kenton-Smith; Women – Imalia Oktrininda.

Athlete	Event	Ranking round		Round of 32	Round of 16	Quarterfinals	Semifinals	Finals	
Athlete	Event	Score	Seed	Opposition score	Opposition score	Opposition score	Opposition score	Opposition score	Rank
Jonathon Milne	Men's individual compound	692	8	Bye	Shelby (USA); L 141–143	Did not advance			
Peter Marchant	Men's individual compound	664	31	Pereira (FRA); W 138–136	Biabani (IRI); L 139–141	Did not advance			
Taymon Kenton-Smith	Men's individual recurve	604	18	Bennett (USA); L 4-6	Did not advance				
Imalia Oktrininda	Women's individual recurve	564	13	Jo J-m (KOR); W 7–1	Petrilli (ITA); L 0–6	Did not advance			
Taymon Kenton-Smith; Imalia Oktrininda	Mixed team recurve	1186	8	Ciszek / Olszewska (POL); L 0–6	Did not advance				

== Athletics ==
Team of 36 athletes selected on 23 July 2021.

Men
Track

Athlete	Events	Heat		Final	
Athlete	Events	Time	Rank	Time	Rank
Luke Bailey	100m T54	14.55	14	Did not advance	
Sam Carter	100m T54	14.19	7q	14.08	5
Sam Carter	400m T54	47.06	9	Did not advance	
Jaryd Clifford; Vincent Donnadieu & Tim Logan (marathon guides)	1500m T13	—N/a		3:54.69	3rd place, bronze medalist(s)
Jaryd Clifford; Vincent Donnadieu & Tim Logan (marathon guides)	5000m T13	—N/a		14:35.52	2nd place, silver medalist(s)
Jaryd Clifford; Vincent Donnadieu & Tim Logan (marathon guides)	Marathon T12	—N/a		2:26:09	2nd place, silver medalist(s)
Daniel Bounty	1500m T38	—N/a		4:12.95	6
Ari Gesini	100m T38	12.40	7	Did not advance	
Sam Harding	1500m T13	—N/a		4:05.13	11
Deon Kenzie	1500m T38	—N/a		4:03.76	3rd place, bronze medalist(s)
Rheed McCracken	100m T34	—N/a		15.37	2nd place, silver medalist(s)
Rheed McCracken	800m T34	1:48.09	7Q	1:47.68	6
Sam McIntosh	100m T52	—N/a		17.824	4
Sam McIntosh	400m T52	1:07.97	5	Did not advance	
Evan O'Hanlon	100m T38	11.31	2 Q	11.00	3rd place, bronze medalist(s)
Jaydon Page	100m T47	11.18	5	Did not advance	
Chad Perris	100m T13	10.90	2 Q	10.84	5
Scott Reardon	100m T63	12.80	4 q	12.43	5
Michael Roeger	Marathon T46	—N/a		2:34:45	6
James Turner	100m T36	11.89	1 Q	12.00	2nd place, silver medalist(s)
James Turner	400m T36	—N/a		52.80 PR	1st place, gold medalist(s)

Field

Athlete	Events	Result	Rank
Corey Anderson	Men's Javelin F38	54.48	4
Michal Burian	Javelin F64	66.29 WR (F44)	2nd place, silver medalist(s)
Ari Gesini	Long Jump T38	5.89	11
Guy Henley	Discus F37	48.72	4
Nicholas Hum	Long Jump T20	7.12 AR	3rd place, bronze medalist(s)
Todd Hodgetts	Shot Put F20	DNS	
Jayden Sawyer	Javelin F38	45.57	7

Technical officials flagged that Hodgetts and Ecuador's Jordi Congo-Villalba and Malaysian Muhammad Ziyad Zolkefli were late to the pre-event call-room, and even though the competition went ahead the results of the trio would be registered as DNS.

Women
Track

Athlete	Events	Heat		Final	
Athlete	Events	Time	Rank	Time	Rank
Eliza Ault-Connell	100 m T54	16.79 q	7q	17.12	8
Eliza Ault-Connell	400 m T54	56.89	8q	56.54	7
Eliza Ault-Connell	Marathon T54	—N/a		1:52:26	13
Angie Ballard	100m T53	—N/a		17.43	7
Angie Ballard	400m T53	58.01	6Q	57.61	7
Angie Ballard	800m T53	1:52.50	4 q	1:52.22	7
Rhiannon Clarke	100m T38	13.10	2 Q	13.08	5
Rhiannon Clarke	100m T38	1:02.65	7q	1:02.65 AR	7
Christine Dawes	Marathon T54	—N/a		1:46:44	8
Madison de Rozario	800m T53	1:49.21	1 Q	1:45.99	1st place, gold medalist(s)
Madison de Rozario	1500m T54	3:36.49	4 q	3:28.24	3rd place, bronze medalist(s)
Madison de Rozario	5000m T54	—N/a		11:15.86	5
Madison de Rozario	Marathon T54	—N/a		1:38:11 GR	1st place, gold medalist(s)
Isis Holt	100m T35	13.49	1 Q	13.13	2nd place, silver medalist(s)
Isis Holt	200m T35	—N/a		27.94	2nd place, silver medalist(s)
Alissa Jordaan	100m T47	12.80	10	Did not advance	
Alissa Jordaan	400m T47	1:00.78	4 q	1:01.30	7
Robyn Lambird	100m T34	—N/a		18.68	3rd place, bronze medalist(s)
Ella Pardy	100m T38	13.15	5 q	13.14	7

Field

Athlete	Events	Result	Rank
Sarah Edmiston	Discus F64	37.85	3rd place, bronze medalist(s)
Rosemary Little	Shot Put F32	6.26	5
Vanessa Low	Long Jump T63	5.28 WR	1st place, gold medalist(s)
Samantha Schmidt	Discus F38	30.26	6
Maria Strong	Shot Put F33	6.63 AR	3rd place, bronze medalist(s)
Sarah Walsh	Long Jump T64	5.11	7

== Badminton ==
Badminton will make its debut at the Summer Paralympics, two athletes were selected – Caitlin Dransfield and Grant Manzoney.

Athlete	Event	Group Stage				Quarterfinal	Semifinal	Final / BM	
Athlete	Event	Opposition Score	Opposition Score	Opposition Score	Rank	Opposition Score	Opposition Score	Opposition Score	Rank
Grant Manzoney	Men's singles WH2	Kim K-h (KOR); L 0–2 (8–21, 5–21)	Kim J-j (KOR); L 0–2 (8–21, 9–21)	—N/a	3	Did not advance			
Caitlin Dransfield	Women's singles SL4	Sagøy (NOR); L 0–2 (17–21, 13–21)	Srinavakul (THA); L 0–2 (8–21, 16–21)	Meier (CAN); L 1–2 (21–7, 13–21, 21–23)	4	Did not advance			

== Boccia ==
Daniel Michel, Spencer Cotie and Jamieson Leeson were selected on 21 June 2021.

Athlete	Event	Pool matches					Quarterfinals	Semifinals	Final / BM	
Athlete	Event	Opposition Score	Opposition Score	Opposition Score	Opposition Score	Rank	Opposition Score	Opposition Score	Opposition Score	Rank
Daniel Michel	Mixed individual BC3	Somboon Chaipanich (THA); W 9–0	Maria Bjurstrom (SWE); W 8–2	Evelyn de Oliveira (BRA); L 2–3	—N/a	2 Q	Hansoo Kim (KOR); W 8–0	Adam Peska (CZE); L 3–4	Scott McCowan (GBR); W 6–1	3rd place, bronze medalist(s)
Spencer Cotie	Mixed individual BC3	Stefania Ferrando (ARG); W 4–1	Jamie McCowan (GBR); W 5–2	Scott McCowan (GBR); L 3–4	—N/a	2	Did not advance			
Daniel Michel; Spencer Cotie; Jamieson Leeson	Mixed pairs BC3	Kawamoto / Takahaski / Tanaka (JPN); L 2–3	Andrade / Costa / Macedo (POR); W 4-3	Oliveira / Carvalho / Calado (BRA); W 5-2	Ho / Liu / Tse (HKG); L 3 (1) - 3 (0)	3	—N/a	Did not advance		

== Cycling ==
12 athletes selected on 9 July 2021. Men – Gordon Allan, Grant Allen, Alistair Donohoe, Stuart Jones, Darren Hicks, David Nicholas, Stuart Tripp; Women – Carol Cooke, Paige Greco, Meg Lemon, Emily Petricola, Amanda Reid

Track Events — Women

Athlete	Event	Qualification		Final	
Athlete	Event	Time	Rank	Opposition Time	Rank
Paige Greco	Individual pursuit C1-3	3:52.283 WR	1 QG	3:50.815	1st place, gold medalist(s)
Meg Lemon	Individual pursuit C4	3:49.043	4 QB	3:49.972	4
Emily Petricola	Individual pursuit C4	3:38.061 WR	1 QG	OVL	1st place, gold medalist(s)
Amanda Reid	500 m time trial C1-3	—N/a		35.581 WR	1st place, gold medalist(s)

Track Events — Men

Athlete	Event	Qualification		Final	
Athlete	Event	Time	Rank	Opposition Time	Rank
Gordon Allan	Time trial C1-3	—N/a		1:06.083	5
Alistair Donohoe	Individual pursuit C5	4:20.813	2 QG	4:24.095	2nd place, silver medalist(s)
Darren Hicks	Individual pursuit C2	3:33.589	2 QG	3:35.064	2nd place, silver medalist(s)
David Nicholas	Individual pursuit C3	3:23.674	3 QB	3:25.877	3rd place, bronze medalist(s)

Track Events — Mixed

Athlete	Event	Qualification		Final	
Athlete	Event	Time	Rank	Opposition Time	Rank
Meg Lemon; Amanda Reid; Gordon Allan	Mixed team sprint C1-5	56.989	9	Did not advance	

Road Events — Women

Athlete	Event	Time	Rank
Carol Cooke	Women's road time trial T1-2	36:38.46	2nd place, silver medalist(s)
Carol Cooke	Women's road race T1-2		DNF
Paige Greco	Women's road time trial C1-3	26:37.54	3rd place, bronze medalist(s)
Paige Greco	Women's road race C1-3	1:13:11	3rd place, bronze medalist(s)
Meg Lemon	Women's road time trial C4	41:14.42	3rd place, bronze medalist(s)
Meg Lemon	Women's road race C4-5	2:31:17	8
Emily Petricola	Women's road time trial C4	39:43.09	2nd place, silver medalist(s)
Emily Petricola	Women's road race C4-5	2:32:58	10

Road Events — Men

Athlete	Event	Time	Rank
Alistair Donohoe	Men's road time trial C4	43:36.80	3rd place, bronze medalist(s)
Alistair Donohoe	Men's road race C4-5	2:19:43	5
Grant Allen	Men's road time trial H4	41:21.94	5
Grant Allen	Men's road race H4	2:33:31	6
Darren Hicks	Men's road time trial C2	34:39.78	1st place, gold medalist(s)
Darren Hicks	Men's road race C1-3	2:12:10	12
Stuart Jones	Men's road time trial H4	31:12.94	5
David Nicholas	Men's road time trial C3	36:56.79	8
David Nicholas	Men's road race C1-3	2:21:08	18
Stuart Tripp	Men's road time trial H5	42:56.88	8
Stuart Tripp	Men's road race H5	2:36:23	7

== Equestrian ==
On 10 July 2021, four riders were selected. Sharon Jarvis became the first Australian Paralympian to be selected for three Games.

Individual competition

Athlete	Horse	Event	Total	
Athlete	Horse	Event	Score	Rank
Emma Booth	Mogelvangs Zidane	Individual championship test grade II	70.059	8Q
Emma Booth	Mogelvangs Zidane	Dressage individual team test grade II	73.807	5
Sharon Jarvis	Romanos	Individual championship test grade III	68.366	10
Sharon Jarvis	Romanos	Dressage individual team test grade III	Did not advance	
Victoria Davies	Celere	Individual championship test grade II	65.618	9
Victoria Davies	Celere	Dressage individual team test grade II	Did not advance	
Amelia White	Genius	Individual championship test grade V	69.238	8Q
Amelia White	Genius	Dressage individual team test grade V	72.660	6

Team competition

Athlete	Horse	Event	Individual score	Total	
Athlete	Horse	Event	TT	Score	Rank
Emma Booth	See above	Team	68.00	206.458	13
Amelia White	See above	Team	67.900	206.458	13
Sharon Jarvis	See above	Team	67.900	206.458	13

== Goalball ==
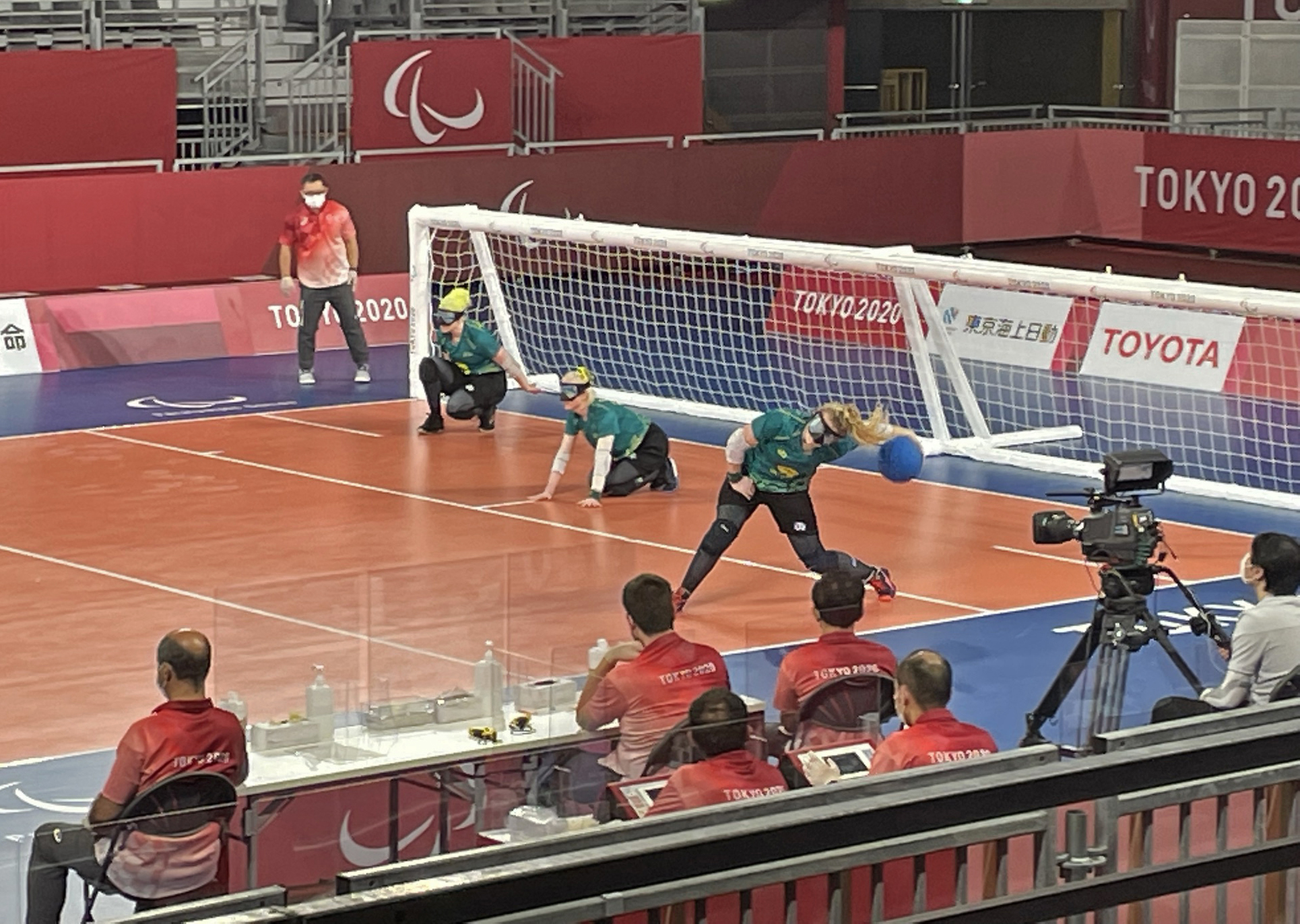
Australian Belles in action at the 2020 Tokyo Paralympics

=== Women's tournament ===
The Australian women's goalball team qualified in a ranking tournament in the US in June–July 2019. The team was announced on 18 June 2021 as Jennifer Blow, Meica Horsburgh, Raissa Martin, Amy Ridley, Brodie Smith, and Tyan Taylor. The following is the Australia roster in the women's goalball tournament of the 2020 Summer Paralympics.

No.	Player	Class	Date of birth (age)
1	Jennifer Blow	B3	10 April 1991 (aged 30)
2	Tyan Taylor	B3	23 March 1990 (aged 31)
3	Amy Ridley	B2	10 July 2002 (aged 19)
7	Raissa Martin	B3	3 March 1991 (aged 30)
8	Meica Horsburgh	B3	24 February 1989 (aged 32)
9	Brodie Smith	B3	8 August 1998 (aged 23)

Group stage

Pos	Team	Pld	W	D	L	GF	GA	GD	Pts	Qualification
1	China	4	3	0	1	17	7	+10	9	Quarterfinals
2	Israel	4	2	0	2	22	14	+8	6	Quarterfinals
3	RPC	4	2	0	2	13	16	−3	6	Quarterfinals
4	Australia	4	2	0	2	9	21	−12	6	Quarterfinals
5	Canada	4	1	0	3	12	15	−3	3	

Source: TOCOG
Rules for classification: 1) points; 2) goal difference; 3) number of wins; 4) goals against; 5) head-to-head goal difference.
25 August 2021
19:00

Israel	11–1	Australia
Mizrahi 1'; Ben-David 2', 2', 5', 7', 7', 14', 16'; Mahamid 18', 18'	Report	Horsburgh 10'

Makuhari Messe, Tokyo
Referee: Raili Sipura (Finland), Launel Scott (Canada)

27 August 2021
14:45

Australia	0–6	China
	Report	Cao Zhenhua 9', 16'; Chen Fengqing 13'; Zhang Xiling 15', 21', 22'

Makuhari Messe, Tokyo
Referee: Launel Scott (Canada), Raili Sipura (Finland)

28 August 2021
09:00

Canada	3–4	Australia
Salehizadeh 16'; Reinke 24', 24'	Report	Horsburgh 12', 18', 19', 23'

Makuhari Messe, Tokyo
Referee: Raili Sipura (Finland), Reza Dehghan (Iran)

29 August 2021
19:00

Australia	4–1	RPC
Horsburgh 1', 5', 19'; Smith 9'	Report	Arestova 19'

Makuhari Messe, Tokyo
Referee: Bas Spaans (Netherlands), Vaida Pokvytytė (Lithuania)

Quarterfinal

1 September 2021
13:15

Turkey	10–6	Australia
Sevd. Altunoluk 1', 3', 4', 6', 6', 9', 17', 17'; Güler 5'; Çelik 24'	Report	Horsburgh 2', 11', 20', 21', 24'; Smith 5'

Makuhari Messe, Tokyo
Referee: Woradet Kultawongwattana (Thailand), Launel Scott (Canada)

== Judo ==
On 27 July 2021, Wayne Phipps was selected, Australia's first representative since 2008 Summer Paralympics.

Athlete	Event	Preliminaries	Quarterfinals	Semifinals	Repechage First round	Repechage Final	Final / BM	
Athlete	Event	Opposition Result	Opposition Result	Opposition Result	Opposition Result	Opposition Result	Opposition Result	Rank
Wayne Phipps	Men's −66 kg	Munkhbat Aajim (MGL); L 0s1 – 10	Did Not Advance					

== Paracanoe ==
Athlete	Event	Heats		Semi-Final		Final	
Athlete	Event	Time	Rank	Time	Rank	Time	Rank
Curtis McGrath	Men's KL2	44.979	3	41.134	1	41.426	1st place, gold medalist(s)
Curtis McGrath	Men's VL3	51.526	1	—N/a		50.537	1st place, gold medalist(s)
Dylan Littlehales	Men's KL3	41.428	2	40.234	1	41.280	4
Susan Seipel	Women's KL2	1:00.077	4	56.201	3	56.522	7
Susan Seipel	Women's VL2	1:02.840	1	—N/a		1:01.481	2nd place, silver medalist(s)
AJ Jennings	Women's KL3	55.961	5	53.373	8	Did not advance	

== Paratriathlon ==
A team of six athletes and two guides on 19 July 2021. Four athletes were selected to make their Paralympics Games debut.

Men

Athlete	Event	Swim	Trans 1	Bike	Trans 2	Run	Total Time	Rank
Nic Beveridge	PTWC	11:42	1:09	38:17	1:00	14:08	1:04:50	7
Jonathan Goerlach; Dave Mainwaring (guide)	PTVI	16:44	1:23	29:31	0:50	17:50	1:06:18	8
David Bryant	PTS5	12:07	1:03	29:57	0:48	18:35	1:02:30	7

Women

Athlete	Event	Swim	Trans 1	Bike	Trans 2	Run	Total Time	Rank
Katie Kelly; Briarna Silk (guide)	PTVI	16:15	1:08	32:25	0:55	22:18	1:13:01	6
Lauren Parker	PTWC	11:47	2:11	37:03	1:09	14:16	1:06:26	2nd place, silver medalist(s)
Emily Tapp	PTWC	14:48	1:50	Did not finish				

== Rowing ==
Australia qualified three boats for each of the following rowing classes into the Paralympic regatta. Rowing crews in the men's single sculls and mixed coxed four qualified after successfully entering the top eight at the 2019 World Rowing Championships in Ottensheim, Austria. Meanwhile, mixed double sculls crews qualified after finishing second at the 2021 Final Paralympic Qualification Regatta in Gavirate, Italy.

At 12 July 2021, Australia eight rowers to compete. Kathryn Ross was selected four her fourth Games and Erik Horrie his third Games.

Athlete	Event	Heats		Repechage		Final	
Athlete	Event	Time	Rank	Time	Rank	Time	Rank
Erik Horrie	Men's single sculls	10:32.92	5	9:20.61	1FA	10:00.82	2nd place, silver medalist(s)
Simon Albury; Kathryn Ross	Mixed double sculls	8:51.39	4	8:12.90	3FB	8:56.69	1 FB
Tom Birtwhistle; James Talbot; Nikki Ayers; Alexandra Viney; Renae Domaschenz (cox)	Mixed coxed four	7:30.72	4	7:06.98	1FA	7:34.73	4

Qualification Legend: FA=Final A (medal); FB=Final B (non-medal); R=Repechage

== Shooting ==
Three athletes were selected on 20 July 2021.

Athlete	Event	Qualification		Final	
Athlete	Event	Score	Rank	Score	Rank
Christopher Pitt	Men's 10 metre air pistol SH1	542 -3x	25	Did not advance	
Christopher Pitt	Mixed 25 metre pistol SH1	259-4x	30	Did not advance	
Natalie Smith	Women's 10 m air rifle standing SH1	609.4	19	Did not advance	
Natalie Smith	Mixed R3-10 m air rifle prone SH1	621.7	46	Did not advance	
Anton Zappelli	Mixed 10 metre air rifle prone SH1	631.6	15	Did not advance	
Anton Zappelli	Mixed 50 metre rifle prone SH1	616.0	11	Did not advance	

== Swimming ==
32 athletes were selected on 16 June 2021. Matthew Levy was selected for his fifth Paralympics. There are 15 debutants. Braedan Jason was added to the team on 14 July 2021 after Australia was granted an additional spot. Blake Cochrane was added to the team on 26 July 2021.

Men's events

Athlete	Events	Heats		Final	
Athlete	Events	Time	Rank	Time	Rank
Jesse Aungles	100 m backstroke S8	1:08.28	3 Q	1:07.94	4
Jesse Aungles	100 m breaststroke SB7	—N/a		1:22.06	4
Jesse Aungles	100 m butterfly S8	1:05.77	11	Did not advance	
Jesse Aungles	200 m individual medley SM8	2:28.75	4 Q	2:29.48	7
Ricky Betar	200 m freestyle S14	1:58.18	6 Q	1:56.70	7
Ricky Betar	100 m butterfly S14	58.25	6 Q	58.62	8
Ricky Betar	100 m backstroke S14	1:01.84	14	Did not advance	
Blake Cochrane	100 m breaststroke SB7	—N/a		1:16.97	3rd place, bronze medalist(s)
Rowan Crothers	50 m freestyle S10	23.25	1 Q	23.21	1st place, gold medalist(s)
Rowan Crothers	100 m freestyle S10	52.70	2 Q	51.37	2nd place, silver medalist(s)
Timothy Disken	50 m freestyle S9	26.11	7 Q	25.71	7
Timothy Disken	100 m breaststroke SB8	1:12.16	8 Q	1:11.81	7
Thomas Gallagher	50 m freestyle S10	24.29	5 Q	24.16	5
Thomas Gallagher	100 m freestyle S10	53.13	4 Q	53.14	5
Thomas Gallagher	400 m freestyle S10	4:15.52	3 Q	4:03.91	3rd place, bronze medalist(s)
Brenden Hall	400 m freestyle S9	4:19.30	5 Q	4:14.48	4
Brenden Hall	100 m backstroke S9	1:05.78	7 Q	1:05.90	8
Brenden Hall	100 m butterfly S9	1:04.70	12	Did not advance	
Benjamin Hance	100 m backstroke S14	57.75 PR	1 Q	57.73 PR	1st place, gold medalist(s)
Benjamin Hance	100 m butterfly S14	57.07	4 Q	56.90	3rd place, bronze medalist(s)
Timothy Hodge	100 m butterfly S9	1:01.58	6 Q	1:01.03	5
Timothy Hodge	100 m backstroke S9	1:02.81	3 Q	1:02.16	3rd place, bronze medalist(s)
Timothy Hodge	200 m individual medley SM9	2:17.41	1 Q	2:15.42	2nd place, silver medalist(s)
Braedan Jason	100 m freestyle S12	54.07	3 Q	53.78	5
Braedan Jason	100 m butterfly S12	59.58	3 Q	59.01	6
Braedan Jason	400 m freestyle S13	4:21.59	6 Q	4:12.75	4
Ahmed Kelly	50 m breaststroke SB3	55.45	8 Q	54.89	7
Ahmed Kelly	150 m individual medley SM3	3:06.72	2 Q	3:02.23	2nd place, silver medalist(s)
Matt Levy	50 m freestyle S7	28.50	4 Q	28.39	5
Matt Levy	100 m breaststroke SB6	1:22.65	2 Q	1:21.10	3rd place, bronze medalist(s)
William Martin	50 m freestyle S9	25.40	3 Q	25.34	4
William Martin	400 m freestyle S9	4:17.99	4 Q	4:10.25 PR	1st place, gold medalist(s)
William Martin	100 m butterfly S9	58.14 WR	1 Q	57.19 WR	1st place, gold medalist(s)
Jake Michel	100 m breaststroke SB14	1:05.30	2 Q	1:04.28	2nd place, silver medalist(s)
Grant Patterson	50 m freestyle S3	54.49	9	Did not advance	
Grant Patterson	200 m freestyle S3	3:57.24	9	Did not advance	
Grant Patterson	50 m backstroke S3	58.15	11	Did not advance	
Grant Patterson	50 m breaststroke SB2	1:02.04	2 Q	1:01.79	2nd place, silver medalist(s)
Grant Patterson	150 m individual medley SM3	3:06.36	1 Q	3:05.57	3rd place, bronze medalist(s)
Col Pearse	100 m backstroke S10	1:04.03	8 Q	1:04.41	8
Col Pearse	100 m butterfly S10	58.23	3 Q	57.66	3rd place, bronze medalist(s)
Col Pearse	200 m individual medley SM10	2:17.41	6 Q	2:14.20	4
Ben Popham	100 m freestyle S8	58.95	1 Q	57.37	1st place, gold medalist(s)
Ben Popham	400 m freestyle S8	4:45.05	8 Q	4:49.32	8
Liam Schluter	200 m freestyle S14	1:58.08	5 Q	1:55.67	4
Liam Schluter	100 m butterfly S14	58.38	9	Did not advance	
Liam Schluter	200 m individual medley SM14	2:16.51	10	Did not advance	
Alexander Tuckfield	50 m freestyle S9	27.32	20	Did not advance	
Alexander Tuckfield	400 m freestyle S9	4:14.26	1 Q	4:13.54	3rd place, bronze medalist(s)
Rowan Crothers; William Martin; Matthew Levy; Ben Popham	Men's 4×100 m freestyle 34 pts	—N/a		3:44.31 WR	1st place, gold medalist(s)
Blake Cochrane^{[a]} Timothy Disken; Timothy Hodge; William Martin; Ben Popham	34pts 4x100m Medley	4:21.45	2 Q	4:07.70	2nd place, silver medalist(s)

^{a} Swimmers who participated in the heats only.

Women's events

Athlete	Events	Heats		Final	
Athlete	Events	Time	Rank	Time	Rank
Emily Beecroft	100 m freestyle S9	1:04.46	7 Q	1:04.47	8
Ellie Cole	100 m freestyle S9	1:03.84	4 Q	1:03.49	5
Ellie Cole	400 m freestyle S9	4:48.29	3 Q	4:43.98	4
Ellie Cole	100 m backstroke S9	1:13.50	4 Q	1:13.15	4
Katja Dedekind	50 m freestyle S13	27.44	4 Q	27.14	4
Katja Dedekind	400 m freestyle S13	4:42.33 1	3 Q	4:35.87	3rd place, bronze medalist(s)
Katja Dedekind	100 m backstroke S13	1:07.38 PR	2 Q	1:06.49	3rd place, bronze medalist(s)
Jasmine Greenwood	100 m freestyle S10	1:01.99	6 Q	1:01.18	5
Jasmine Greenwood	100 m backstroke S10	1:10.23	2 Q	1:10.34	4
Jasmine Greenwood	100 m butterfly S10	—N/a		1:07.89	2nd place, silver medalist(s)
Jasmine Greenwood	200 m individual medley SM10	2:31.98	3 Q	2:31.06	5
Kirralee Hayes	50 m freestyle S11	28.29	11	Did not advance	
Kirralee Hayes	100 m butterfly S11	1:12.68	12	Did not advance	
Paige Leonhardt	100 m butterfly S14	1:06.93	2 Q	1:05.48	2nd place, silver medalist(s)
Paige Leonhardt	100 m breaststroke SB14	1:17.80	2 Q	1:17.90	6
Paige Leonhardt	200 m individual medley SM14	2:32.70	4 Q	2:32.69	6
Ashleigh McConnell	100 m freestyle S9	1:04.30	6 Q	1:03.81	6
Madeleine McTernan	100 m backstroke S14	1:09.65	4 Q	1:09.82	4
Lakeisha Patterson	400 m freestyle S9	4:49.91	4 Q	4:36.68	1st place, gold medalist(s)
Keira Stephens	50 m freestyle S10	29.08	9	Did not advance	
Keira Stephens	100 m breaststroke SB9	1:19.08	4 Q	1:17.59	3rd place, bronze medalist(s)
Keira Stephens	200 m individual medley SM10	2:38.94	8 Q	2:37.76	8
Ruby Storm	200 m freestyle S14	2:17.88	7 Q	2:17.33	7
Ruby Storm	100 m backstroke S14	1:12.71	7 Q	1:15.38	8
Ruby Storm	100 m butterfly S14	1:07.77	6 Q	1:06.50	3rd place, bronze medalist(s)
Ruby Storm	200 m individual medley SM14	2:36.72	7 Q	2:36.58	7
Tiffany Thomas Kane	100 m breaststroke SB7	1:34.90	2 Q	1:35.02	3rd place, bronze medalist(s)
Tiffany Thomas Kane	50 m butterfly S7	39.64	9	Did not advance	
Tiffany Thomas Kane	200 m individual medley SM7	3:09.27	5 Q	3:03.11	3rd place, bronze medalist(s)
Ashley Van Rijswijk	100 m breaststroke SM14	1:18.43	4 Q	1:17.84	5
Ashley Van Rijswijk	200 m individual medley SM14	2:39.10	12	Did not advance	
Isabella Vincent	100 m freestyle S7	1:17.44	10	Did not advance	
Isabella Vincent	200 m individual medley SM7	3:15.78	6 Q	3:13.46	6
Rachael Watson	50 m freestyle S5	43.32	5 Q	39.36 PR	1st place, gold medalist(s)
Rachael Watson	100 m freestyle S5	1:35.27 PR(S4)	11	Did not advance	
Ellie Cole; Isabella Vincent; Emily Beecroft; Ashleigh McConnell	34pts 4x100m Freestyle	—N/a		4:26.82	2nd place, silver medalist(s)
Ellie Cole; Keira Stephens; Emily Beecroft; Isabella Vincent	34pts 4x100m Medley	—N/a		4:55.70	3rd place, bronze medalist(s)

Mixed events

Athletes	Event	Final	
Athletes	Event	Time	Rank
Ricky Betar; Benjamin Hance; Madeleine McTernan; Ruby Storm	4 x 100 m freestyle S14	3:46.38	2nd place, silver medalist(s)

== Table tennis ==
Australia entered eleven athletes into the table tennis competition at the games. Ten of them qualified from 2019 ITTF Oceanian Para Championships which was held in Darwin, and Yang Qian qualified via World Ranking allocation. Team of 11 athletes selected on 5 July 2021.

Men

Athlete	Event	Group Stage				Round of 16	Quarterfinals	Semifinals	Final	
Athlete	Event	Opposition Result	Opposition Result	Opposition Result	Rank	Opposition Result	Opposition Result	Opposition Result	Opposition Result	Rank
Trevor Hirth	Individual C6	Simion (ROM); L 1–3 (7–11, 13–11, 2–11, 3–11)	Karabardak (GBR); L 0–3 (5–11, 8–11, 2–11)	—N/a	3	—N/a	Did not advance			
Jake Ballestrino	Individual C7	Youssef (EGY); L 1–3 (5–11, 11–8, 2–11, 9–11)	Inoue (JPN); L 1–3 (12–10, 4–11, 10–12, 3–11)	Stroh (BRA); L 0–3 (5–11, 3–11, 6–11)	4	—N/a	Did not advance			
Nathan Pellissier	Individual C8	McKibbin (GBR); L 0–3 (9–11, 5–11, 5–11)	Grudzien (POL); L 0–3 (4–11, 10–12, 7–11)	—N/a	3	—N/a	Did not advance			
Ma Lin	Individual C9	Stacey (GBR); W 3–0 (11–3, 11–4, 11–6)	Kalem (ITA); W 3–0 (11–4 11–6 11–9)	Chee (MAS); W 3–0 (11–5, 11–6, 11–7)	1 Q	—N/a	Kats (UKR); W 3–0 (11–8, 11–7, 11–7)	Mai (UKR); W 3–1 (12–10, 7–11, 11–6, 11–5)	Devos (BEL); L 1–3 (11–9, 6–11, 3–11, 3–11)	2nd place, silver medalist(s)
Joel Coughlan	Individual C10	Radovic (MNE); L 1–3 (11–13, 13–11, 7–11, 9–11)	Olufemi (NGR); W 3–0 (11–9, 11–8, 11–6)	Hao (CHN); L 2–3 (11–4, 5–11, 13–11, 4–11, 7–11)	3	—N/a	Did not advance			
Samuel von Einem	Individual C11	Asano (JPN); L 3–1 (11–7, 6–11, 6–11, 6–11)	Gi T-k (KOR); W 3–0 (11–5, 11–8, 11–9)	—N/a	1 Q	—N/a	Martinez (ESP); W 3–1 (8–11, 11–8, 11–7, 11–7)	Van Acker (BEL); W 3–2 (4–11, 4–11, 11–9, 11–8, 11–5)	Palos (HUN); L 2–3 (11–6, 7–11, 11–7, 6–11, 9–11)	2nd place, silver medalist(s)
Trevor Hirth; Jake Ballestrino	Team C6-7	—N/a					Karabardak / Bayley (GBR); L 0–2	Did not advance		
Ma Lin; Joel Coughlan; Nathan Pellissier	Team C9-10	—N/a				Manara / Carbinatti (BRA); W 2–0	de la Bourdonnaye / Bohéas (FRA); W 2–0	Agunbiade / Olufemi (NGR); W 2–0	Hao / Zhao (CHN); L 0-2	2nd place, silver medalist(s)

Women

Athlete	Event	Group Stage				Quarterfinals	Semifinals	Final	
Athlete	Event	Opposition Result	Opposition Result	Opposition Result	Rank	Opposition Result	Opposition Result	Opposition Result	Rank
Daniela Di Toro	Individual C4	Mikolaschek (GER); L 0–3 (6–11, 4–11, 11–13)	Matic (SRB); L 0–3 (5–11, 8–11, 7–11)	—N/a	3	Did not advance			
Rebecca Julian	Individual C6	Lytochenko (UKR); L 3–0 (2–11, 6–11, 8–11)	Hammad (EGY); W 3–0 (11–6, 11–7, 11–3)	—N/a	2 Q	Alieva (RPC); L 0–3 (13–15, 4–11, 5–11)	Did not advance		
Lei Li Na	Individual C9	Parinos (BRA); W 3–0 (11–4, 11–8, 11–4)	Pek (POL); W 3–1 (11–6, 9–11, 11–5, 12–10)	Kim (KOR); W 3–1 (7–11, 11–9, 11–4, 11–7)	1 Q	—N/a	Szvitacs (HUN); W 3–2 (12–14, 11–13, 11–5, 11–8, 11–6)	Xiong (CHN); W 3–2 (6–11, 11–5, 11–5, 9–11, 11–5)	1st place, gold medalist(s)
Melissa Tapper	Individual C10	Tzu (TPE); W 3–1 (9–11, 11–8, 11–6, 11–9)	Alexandre (BRA); L 0–3 (7–11, 2–11, 6–11)	—N/a	2 Q	Yang (AUS); L 0–3 (11–13, 3–11, 8–11)	Did not advance		
Yang Qian	Individual C10	Zhao (CHN); W 3–2 (15–13, 10–12, 9–11, 11–9, 11–3)	Shiau (TPE); L 0–3 (9–11, 11–13, 10–12)	Obazuaye (NGR); W 3–0 (11–9, 11–1, 11–3)	2 Q	Tapper (AUS); W 3–0 (13–11, 11–3, 11–8)	Partyka (POL); W 3–2 (11–7, 4–11, 9–11, 11–6, 11–9)	Alexandre (BRA); W 3–1 (13–11, 6–11, 11–7, 11–9)	1st place, gold medalist(s)
Yang Qian; Lei Li Na; Melissa Tapper	Team C9-10	—N/a				Arloy / Szvitacs (HUN); W 2–0	Xiong / Zhao (CHN); W 2–0	Partyka / Pek (POL); L 0-2	2nd place, silver medalist(s)

== Taekwondo ==
Australia selected one athlete for the inaugural para taekwondo competition.

Athlete	Event	First round	Repechage 1	Repechage 2	Bronze Medal	
Athlete	Event	Opposition Result	Opposition Result	Opposition Result	Opposition Result	Rank
Janine Watson	Women's +58 kg	Akermach (MAR); L 6-8	Emeksiz Bacaksiz (TUR); W 36-2	Ota (JPN); W 32-12	Lypetska (UKR); W 63-0	3rd place, bronze medalist(s)

== Wheelchair basketball ==
Gliders team of 12 athletes was announced on 16 July 2021. Rollers team of 12 athletes was announced on 21 July 2021.

=== Men's tournament ===
Found team: Australia The following is the Australia roster in the men's wheelchair basketball tournament of the 2020 Summer Paralympics.

Australia men's national wheelchair basketball team - 2020 Summer Paralympics roster
Players
Coaches

No.	Name	Age – Date of birth	Pts.
1	Samuel White	34 – 19 June 1987	1.0
2	Jeremy Tyndall	25 – 5 April 1996	1.5
5	Bill Latham	31 – 29 October 1989	4.0
6	Brett Stibners	42 – 25 June 1979	4.0
7	Shaun Norris	36 – 2 April 1985	3.0
8	Kim Robins	33 – 12 June 1988	3.0
9	Tristan Knowles	38 – 25 April 1983	4.0
10	Jannik Blair	29 – 3 February 1992	1.0
11	Tom O'Neill-Thorne	24 – 8 April 1997	3.0
12	Matthew McShane	30 – 1 November 1990	1.5
15	Michael Auprince	28 – 21 February 1993	4.0
33	John McPhail	31 – 30 December 1989	3.0

Head coach

Craig Friday

Assistant coach(es)

Brad Ness, Grant Mizens

Legend

- Age - describes age on 24 August 2021

Group B

Pos	Team	Pld	W	L	PF	PA	PD	Pts	Qualification
1	Great Britain	5	4	1	332	303	+29	9	Quarter-finals
2	United States	5	4	1	338	223	+115	9	Quarter-finals
3	Australia	5	3	2	335	265	+70	8	Quarter-finals
4	Germany	5	3	2	306	284	+22	8	Quarter-finals
5	Iran	5	1	4	271	318	−47	6	9th/10th place playoff
6	Algeria	5	0	5	202	391	−189	5	11th/12th place playoff

Source: TOCOG
Rules for classification: 1) Points; 2) Head-to-head results; 3) Points difference; 4) Points scored.

26 August 2021
14:45

Report

Australia	81–39	Iran
Scoring by quarter: 28–8, 20–11, 17–5, 16–15
Pts: Stibners 21; Rebs: Auprince 8 Asts: Norris 6		Pts: Sayari 22; Rebs: Sayari 9 Asts: Bagzadehfard, Sayari 3

Musashino Forest Sport Plaza
Referees: Gustavo Mathias

27 August 2021
9:00

Report

Algeria	37–83	Australia
Scoring by quarter: 9–21, 8–21, 14–20, 6–21
Pts: Zidi 14; Rebs: Zidi 10; Asts: Guedoun 5		Pts: Latham 16; Rebs: Latham 10; Asts: McPhail 13

Musashino Forest Sport Plaza
Attendance: 180
Referees: Erik Etzelmueller

28 August 2021
11:15

Report

Australia	64–53	Germany
Scoring by quarter: 21–11, 7–11, 20–19, 16–12
Pts: Latham 17; Rebs: Latham 11; Asts: Norris 10		Pts: Halouski 13; Rebs: Bienek 9 Asts: Halouski 8

Ariake Arena
Referees: Adam Fronczak

29 August 2021
14:45

Report

United States	66–38	Australia
Scoring by quarter: 17–15, 21–11, 16–4, 12–8
Pts: Williams 24; Rebs: Serio 9 Asts: Williams 7		Pts: Latham 13; Rebs: Latham 9 Asts: O'Neill-Thorne 7

Musashino Forest Sport Plaza
Attendance: 810
Referees: Linas Radykas

30 August 2021
17:15

Report

Australia	69–70	Great Britain
Scoring by quarter: 27–12, 11–13, 17–25, 14–20
Pts: O'Neill-Thorne 23; Rebs: Latham 10; Asts: Norris, O'Neill-Thorne 8		Pts: Choudhry 28; Rebs: Manning 14; Asts: Choudhry 11

Ariake Arena
Referees: Sebastien Gauthier

Quarter-finals

1 September 2021
20:45

Report

Japan	61–55	Australia
Scoring by quarter: 14–14, 21–16, 12–9, 14–16
Pts: Kozai 20; Rebs: Chokai 12; Asts: Chokai 9		Pts: O'Neill-Thorne 18; Rebs: Auprince, O'Neill-Thorne 5 Asts: O'Neill-Thorne 7

Ariake Arena
Attendance: 190
Referees: Darrell Hargreaves

5th–6th classification match

4 September 2021
14:45

Report

Turkey	58–74	Australia
Scoring by quarter: 18–23, 6–16, 16–20, 18–15
Pts: Toprak 12; Rebs: Gümüş 10; Asts: four players 3		Pts: Knowles 31; Rebs: Knowles, O'Neill-Thorne 6 Asts: Knowles 7

Ariake Arena
Attendance: 38
Referees: Hsieh Shu-fei

Bracket

Quarter-finals
1 September
Germany	71
Spain	68
1 September
United States	52
Turkey	45
1 September
Japan	61
Australia	55
1 September
Canada	52
Great Britain	66

Semi-finals
3 September
Spain	52
United States	66
3 September
Japan	79
Great Britain	68

Gold medal match
5 September
United States	64
Japan	60
Bronze medal match
5 September
Spain	58
Great Britain	68

=== Women's tournament ===
The following is the Australia roster in the women's wheelchair basketball tournament of the 2020 Summer Paralympics.

Australia women's national wheelchair basketball team - 2020 Summer Paralympics roster
Players
Coaches

No.	Name	Age – Date of birth	Pts.
4	Sarah Vinci	29 – 4 December 1991	1.0
5	Jessica Cronje	23 – 25 January 1998	4.0
6	Hannah Dodd	29 – 27 April 1992	1.0
7	Shelley Cronau	36 – 29 May 1985	2.5
8	Georgia Munro-Cook	27 – 17 May 1994	4.5
10	Bree Mellberg	31 – 14 April 1990	3.0
13	Taishar Ovens	23 – 7 April 1998	1.0
14	Ella Sabljak	29 – 17 October 1991	1.0
15	Amber Merritt	28 – 17 February 1993	4.5
21	Mary Friday	23 – 2 April 1998	1.0
22	Isabel Martin	22 – 11 March 1999	1.0
23	Natalie Alexander	30 – 6 April 1991	2.5

Head coach

Craig Friday

Assistant coach(es)

Craig Campbell, Sarah Graham

Legend

- Age - describes age on 24 August 2021

Group A

Pos	Team	Pld	W	L	PF	PA	PD	Pts	Qualification
1	Germany	4	4	0	248	204	+44	8	Quarter-finals
2	Canada	4	3	1	267	185	+82	7	Quarter-finals
3	Japan (H)	4	2	2	216	215	+1	6	Quarter-finals
4	Great Britain	4	1	3	212	218	−6	5	Quarter-finals
5	Australia	4	0	4	180	301	−121	4	9th/10th place playoff

Source: TOCOG
Rules for classification: 1) Points; 2) Head-to-head results; 3) Points difference; 4) Points scored.
(H) Hosts

25 August 2021
17:00

Report

Australia	47–73	Japan
Scoring by quarter: 14–16, 14–18, 11–18, 8–21
Pts: Merritt 18; Rebs: Merritt 19; Asts: Merritt 4		Pts: Kitada 16; Rebs: Amimoto 11; Asts: Amimoto 11

Musashino Forest Sport Plaza
Referees: Celine Villard

26 August 2021
9:00

Report

Germany	77–58	Australia
Scoring by quarter: 24–13, 21–12, 7–14, 25–19
Pts: Miller 30; Rebs: Miller 11; Asts: Lang, Miller 8		Pts: Merritt 27; Rebs: Merritt 10; Asts: Merritt 6

Musashino Forest Sport Plaza
Attendance: 360
Referees: Hsieh Shu-fei

28 August 2021
20:30

Report

Australia	38–75	Great Britain
Scoring by quarter: 6–20, 12–20, 12–23, 8–12
Pts: Munro-Cook 16; Rebs: Merritt 10; Asts: Merritt, Munro-Cook 3		Pts: Williams 18; Rebs: Freeman 10; Asts: Freeman 10

Ariake Arena
Referees: Matias Quintana

29 August 2021
20:30

Report

Canada	76–37	Australia
Scoring by quarter: 20–11, 19–14, 19–8, 18–4
Pts: Steeves 17; Rebs: Dandeneau 8 Asts: Dandeneau 6		Pts: Merrit 21; Rebs: Merritt 6 Asts: Merritt 6

Musashino Forest Sport Plaza
Attendance: 0
Referees: Juan Urunuela

Classification playoffs −9th/10th

31 August 2021
9:00

Report

Australia	71–32	Algeria
Scoring by quarter: 27–8, 15–9, 17–7, 12–8
Pts: Merritt 27; Rebs: Merritt 8 Asts: Merritt 5		Pts: Boublal 9 Rebs: Boublal, Zairi 6 Asts: Abdelali, Khemgani, Zairi 3

Ariake Arena
Referees: Ben Wood

== Wheelchair rugby ==
Australia national wheelchair rugby team qualified for the Games by winning the silver medal at the 2018 World Championships in Sydney.

Team roster

On 29 July 2021, Australia selected twelve players two compete, with four athletes making their games debut.

- Ryley Batt
- Chris Bond
- Ben Fawcett
- Andrew Harrison
- Shae Graham
- Jake Howe
- Josh Hose
- Jason Lees
- Michael Ozanne
- Richard Voris
- Jayden Warn

Group stage

Pos	Team	Pld	W	D	L	GF	GA	GD	Pts	Qualification
1	Japan (H)	3	3	0	0	170	155	+15	6	Semi-finals
2	Australia	3	1	0	2	156	159	−3	2	Semi-finals
3	France	3	1	0	2	151	153	−2	2	Fifth place Match
4	Denmark	3	1	0	2	155	165	−10	2	Seventh place Match

Source: Tokyo2020
(H) Hosts
25 August 2020
12:45

Australia	53–54	Denmark

Yoyogi National Stadium, Tokyo

26 August 2021
12:45

Australia	50–48	France

Yoyogi National Stadium, Tokyo

27 August 2021
12:45

Australia	53–57	Japan

Yoyogi National Stadium, Tokyo

Medal round bracket

Semifinals
28 August
Japan	49
Great Britain	55
28 August
United States	49
Australia	42

Gold Medal Match
29 August
Great Britain	54
United States	49
Bronze medal
29 August
Japan	60
Australia	52

== Wheelchair tennis ==
Australia qualified four players entries for wheelchair tennis. Three players qualified by the world rankings, meanwhile the other qualified by received the bipartite commission invitation allocation quotas.

Athlete	Event	Round of 64	Round of 32	Round of 16	Quarterfinals	Semifinals	Final / BM	
Athlete	Event	Opposition Result	Opposition Result	Opposition Result	Opposition Result	Opposition Result	Opposition Result	Rank
Dylan Alcott	Quad singles	—N/a		Moroishi (JPN); W 6–0, 6–2	Barten (USA); W 6–0, 6–1	Vink (NED); W 6–4, 3–6, 6–4	Schröder (NED); W 7–6, 6-1	1st place, gold medalist(s)
Heath Davidson	Quad singles	—N/a		Cotterill (GBR); W 6–1, 6–0	Schröder (NED); L 2–6, 1–6	Did not advance		
Martyn Dunn	Men's singles	Casco (ARG); L 0–6, 0–6	Did not advance					
Ben Weekes	Men's singles	Berdichevsky (ISR); W 6–4, 6–2	Vandorpe (BEL); L 6–3, 1–6, 0–6	Did not advance				
Dylan Alcott; Heath Davidson	Quad doubles	—N/a			Bye	Moroishi / Sugeno (JPN); W 6–2, 6–4	Schröder / Vink (NED); L 4–6, 3–6	2nd place, silver medalist(s)
Martyn Dunn; Ben Weekes	Men's doubles	—N/a	Silva / Rodrigues (BRA); L 2–6, 3–6	Did not advance				

== Facts ==
- Paralympics Games representation: Seven – Christie Dawes (athletics) Daniela di Toro (tennis / table tennis); Six – Angie Ballard (athletics); Five – Matthew Levy (swimming), Lei Li Na (table tennis), Tristan Knowles (wheelchair basketball), Shaun Norris (wheelchair basketball), Ryley Batt (wheelchair rugby) Ben Weekes (wheelchair tennis)
- Indigenous athletes – Amanda Reid (cycling), Ruby Storm (swimming), Samantha Schmidt (athletics)
- Youngest – Isabella Vincent (swimming) and oldest Peter Marchant (archery)
- Dual Paralympian and Olympian – Melissa Tapper (table tennis)
- Multiple Paralympic sports representation – Daniela di Toro (tennis / table tennis), Michael Auprince (swimming/ wheelchair basketball), Dylan Alcott (wheelchair basketball/wheelchair tennis), Amanda Reid (swimming/ cycling). Hannah Dodd (equestrian/wheelchair basketball)
- Represented other Paralympic nations – Ma Lin, Lei Li Na, Yang Qian (All represented China in table tennis), Vanessa Low (represented Germany in athletics)

== See also ==
- Australia at the 2020 Summer Olympics
- Australia at the Paralympics
- Australian Paralympic Archery team
- Australian Paralympic Athletics Team
- Australian Paralympic Boccia Team
- Australian Paralympic Cycling Team
- Australian Paralympic Equestrian Team
- Australian Paralympic Paracanoe Team
- Australian Paralympic Paratriathlon Team
- Australian Paralympic Rowing Team
- Australian Paralympic Sailing Team
- Australian Paralympic Shooting Team
- Australian Paralympic Swim Team
- Australian Paralympic Table Tennis Team
- Australian Paralympic wheelchair tennis team
- Australia men's national wheelchair basketball team
- Australia national wheelchair rugby team
- Australia women's national goalball team
