= Athletics at the 2020 Summer Paralympics – Women's 400 metres T53 =

Women's 400 metres T53 at the XVI Paralympic Games
- Venue: Tokyo National Stadium
- Dates: 2 September 2021 (final)
- Competitors: 11 from 8 nations
- Winning time: 56.18

Medalists
1st place, gold medalist(s)		Catherine Debrunner	Switzerland
2nd place, silver medalist(s)		Samantha Kinghorn	Great Britain
3rd place, bronze medalist(s)		Zhou Hongzhuan	China

The women's 400 metres T53 event at the 2020 Summer Paralympics in Tokyo, took place on 2 September 2021.

The T53 category is for wheelchair athletes with normal use of arms and hands, no or limited trunk function, and no leg function.

== Records ==
Prior to the competition, the existing records were as follows:

World Record	Chelsea McClammer (USA)	53.32	Arbon, Switzerland	25 May 2017
Paralympic Record	Zhou Hongzhuan (CHN)	54.43	Rio de Janeiro, Brazil	11 September 2016

Area	Time	Athlete	Nation
Africa	1:02.85	Anne Wafula	Kenya
America	53.32 WR	Chelsea McClammer	United States
Asia	54.25	Zhou Hongzhuan	China
Europe	53.72	Samantha Kinghorn	Great Britain
Oceania	54.55	Angela Ballard	Australia

== Results ==
=== Heats ===
Heat 1 took place on 2 September 2021, at 12:10:

Rank	Lane	Name	Nationality	Time	Notes
1	5	Samantha Kinghorn	Great Britain	56.73	Q
2	6	Gao Fang	China	57.28	Q, SB
3	4	Angie Ballard	Australia	58.01	Q
4	3	Jessica Frotten	Canada	59.98	q
5	7	Yen Hoang	United States	1:00.58	

Heat 2 took place on 2 September 2021, at 12:17:

Rank	Lane	Name	Nationality	Time	Notes
1	6	Catherine Debrunner	Switzerland	55.21	Q
2	4	Zhou Hongzhuan	China	56.14	Q, SB
3	3	Hamide Doğangün	Turkey	56.68	Q
4	5	Chelsea McClammer	United States	59.66	q
5	7	Jessica Cooper Lewis	Bermuda	1:01.71	
6	8	Kelsey Lefevour	United States	1:04.88	

=== Final ===
The final took place on 2 September, at 19:30:

Rank	Lane	Name	Nationality	Time	Notes
1st place, gold medalist(s)	4	Catherine Debrunner	Switzerland	56.18	
2nd place, silver medalist(s)	6	Samantha Kinghorn	Great Britain	57.25	
3rd place, bronze medalist(s)	3	Zhou Hongzhuan	China	57.29	
4	7	Angie Ballard	Australia	57.61	
5	5	Gao Fang	China	57.81	
6	8	Hamide Doğangün	Turkey	58.67	
7	2	Chelsea McClammer	United States	59.45	
8	1	Jessica Frotten	Canada	1:01.16	
