= Athletics at the 2020 Summer Paralympics – Women's 800 metres T53 =

Women's 800 metres T53 at the XVI Paralympic Games
- Venue: Tokyo National Stadium
- Dates: 29 August 2021 (final)
- Competitors: 11 from 8 nations
- Winning time: 1:45.99

Medalists
1st place, gold medalist(s)		Madison de Rozario	Australia
2nd place, silver medalist(s)		Zhou Hongzhuan	China
3rd place, bronze medalist(s)		Catherine Debrunner	Switzerland

The women's 800 metres T53 event at the 2020 Summer Paralympics in Tokyo, took place on 29 August 2021.

The T53 category is for wheelchair athletes with normal use of arms and hands, no or limited trunk function, and no leg function.

== Records ==
Prior to the competition, the existing records were as follows:

World Record	Madison de Rozario (AUS)	1:45.53	Canberra, Australia	21 January 2019
Paralympic Record	Zhou Hongzhuan (CHN)	1:47.45	Rio de Janeiro, Brazil	17 September 2016

Area	Time	Athlete	Nation
Africa	2:13.00	Anne Wafula	Kenya
America	1:45.90	Chelsea McClammer	United States
Asia	1:47.45 PR	Zhou Hongzhuan	China
Europe	1:47.15	Catherine Debrunner	Switzerland
Oceania	1:45.53 WR	Madison de Rozario	Australia

== Results ==
=== Heats ===
Heat 1 took place on 29 August 2021, at 10:36:

Rank	Lane	Name	Nationality	Time	Notes
1	6	Madison de Rozario	Australia	1:49.21	Q
2	7	Samantha Kinghorn	Great Britain	1:50.83	Q
3	3	Yen Hoang	United States	1:51.49	Q, PB
4	4	Jessica Frotten	Canada	1:56.79	SB
	5	Gao Fang	China	DQ	WPA 18.7

Heat 2 took place on 29 August 2021, at 10:45:

Rank	Lane	Name	Nationality	Time	Notes
1	6	Hamide Doğangün	Turkey	1:51.05	Q, SB
2	3	Zhou Hongzhuan	China	1:51.16	Q, SB
3	5	Catherine Debrunner	Switzerland	1:51.47	Q
4	4	Angie Ballard	Australia	1:52.50	q, SB
5	7	Chelsea McClammer	United States	1:52.69	q
6	8	Jessica Cooper Lewis	Bermuda	1:57.77	PB

=== Final ===
The final took place on 29 August 2021, at 19:04:

Rank	Lane	Name	Nationality	Time	Notes
1st place, gold medalist(s)	5	Madison de Rozario	Australia	1:45.99	GR
2nd place, silver medalist(s)	7	Zhou Hongzhuan	China	1:47.66	SB
3rd place, bronze medalist(s)	8	Catherine Debrunner	Switzerland	1:47.90	
4	4	Samantha Kinghorn	Great Britain	1:47.94	SB
5	6	Hamide Doğangün	Turkey	1:48.94	PB
6	3	Chelsea McClammer	United States	1:51.19	SB
7	2	Angie Ballard	Australia	1:52.22	SB
8	9	Yen Hoang	United States	1:52.40	
