= Australian Paralympic Boccia Team =

Paralympic sports team

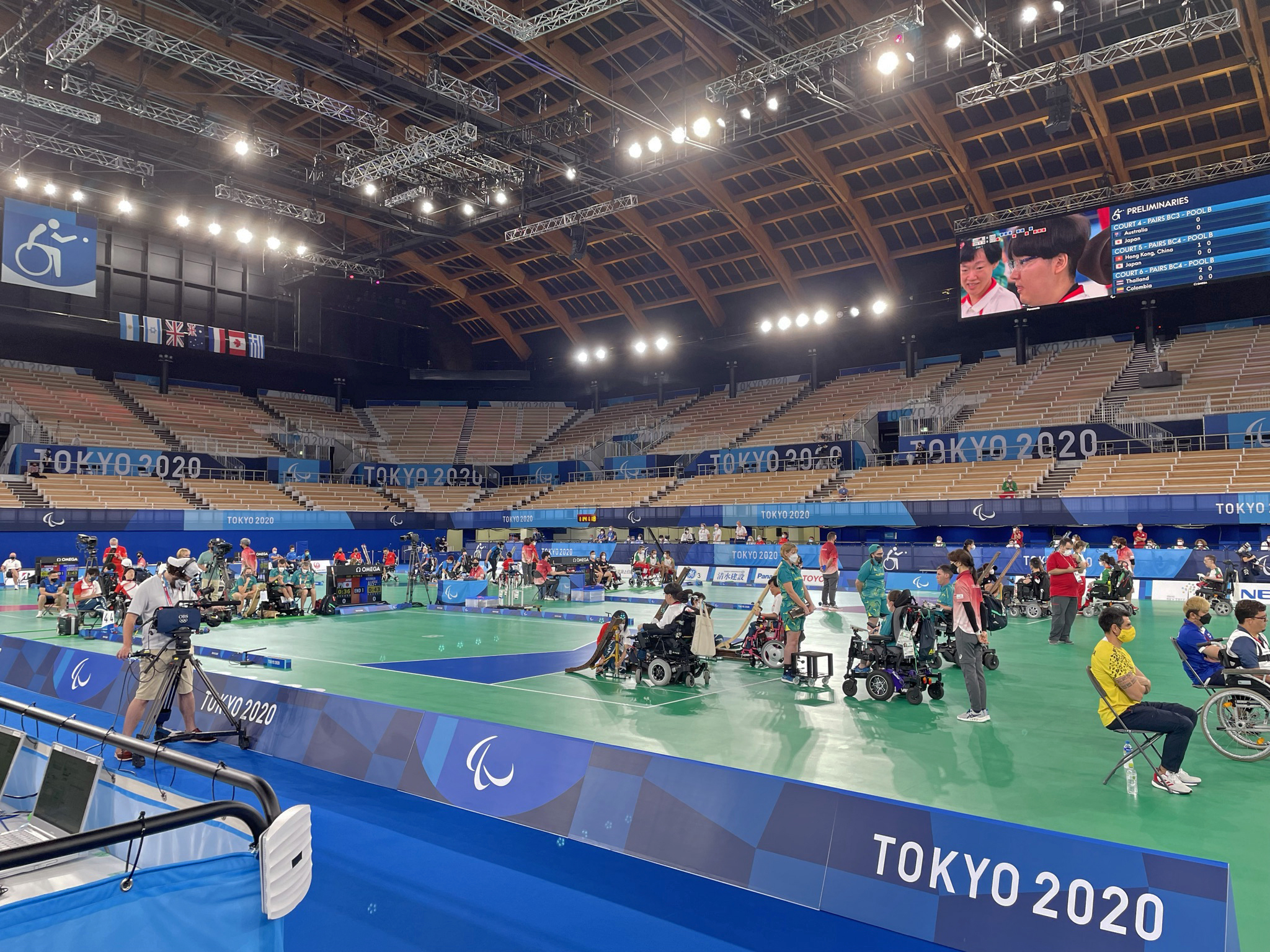
Australian paralympic boccia competitors in Tokyo venue

Boccia was the first cerebral palsy sport to be added to the Paralympic program in the 1984 Summer Paralympics.

Australia first started participating in the 1988 Summer Paralympics

== Medal tally ==
Games	Gold	Silver	Bronze	Total
1988 Seoul	0	0	0	0
1992 Barcelona	0	0	0	0
1996 Atlanta	0	0	1	1
2000 Sydney	0	0	0	0
2004 Athens	0	0	0	0
2008 Beijing	0	0	0	0
2012 London	0	0	0	0
2016 Rio	0	0	0	0
2020 Tokyo	0	0	1	1
2024 Paris	0	2	0	2
Totals (10 entries)	0	2	2	4

== Summer Paralympic Games ==
=== 1988 Seoul ===
Australia was represented by a team of four athletes:

Men - Bourke Gibbons OAM, Murray Parker, Donald Turton

Women - Lynette Coleman

Australia did not win any medals.

Event	Athlete	Pool play		Quarter-finals	Semi-finals	Final	Rank
Event	Athlete	W-L	Rank	Opposition Result	Opposition Result	Opposition Result	Rank
Mixed Individual C1	Lynette Coleman	0-3	4	Did not advance			
Mixed Individual C2	Burke Gibbons	1-2	3	Did not advance			
Mixed Individual C2	Murray Parker	2-1	2	(South Korea) Lee (KOR) L 0:7	Did not advance		
Mixed Individual C2	Donald Turton	0-3	4	Did not advance			
Mixed Team C1-C2	Lynette Coleman Murray Parker; Burke Gibbons	1-2	3	Did not advance			

=== 1992 Barcelona ===
Australia represented by:

- Men – Burke Gibbons, Corey Molen, Alexander Xeras
- Women – Lyn Coleman
- Officials – Tom Organ (Manager)

Australia did not win any medals.

=== 1996 Atlanta ===
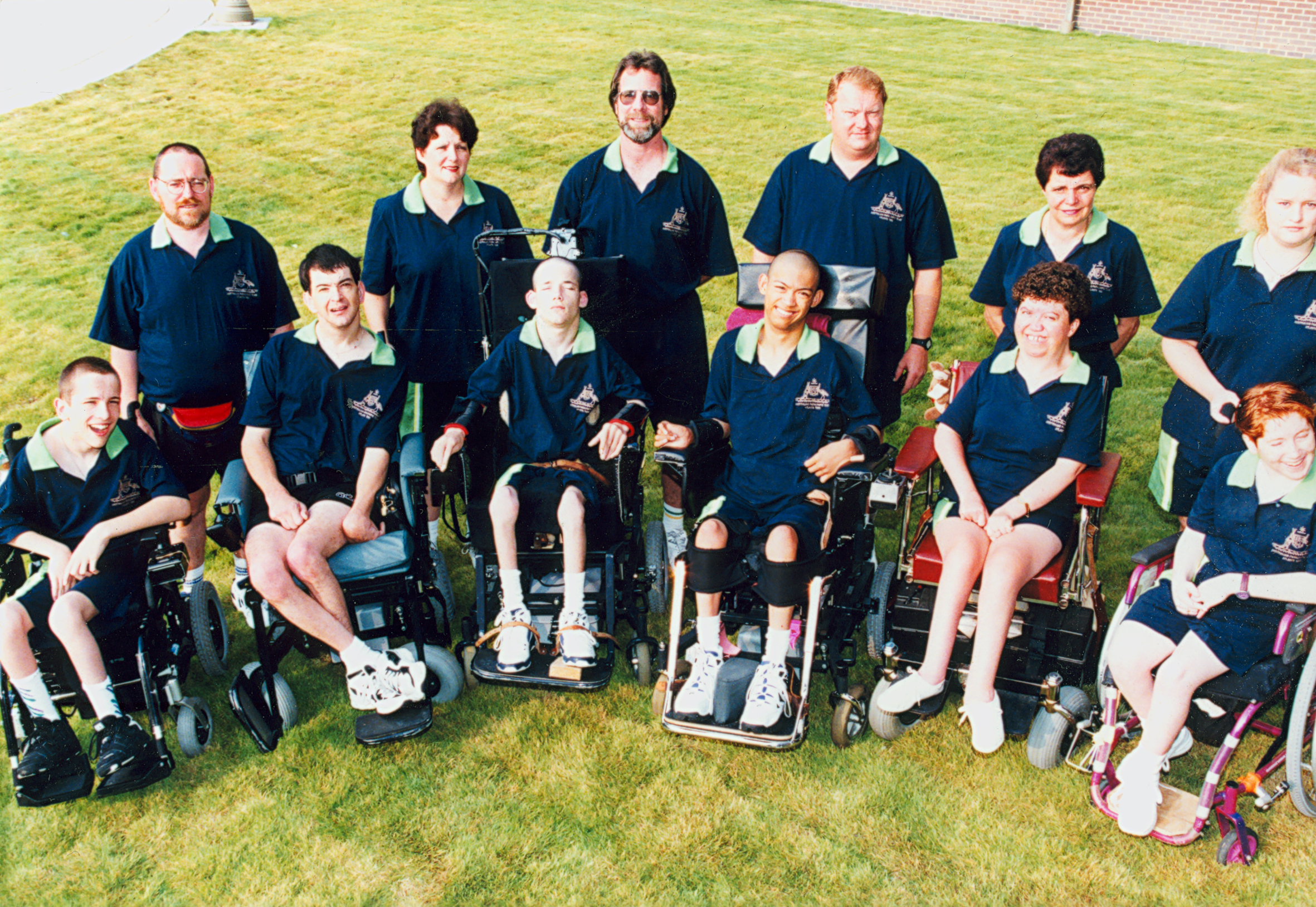
Australian Boccia team.

Australia represented by:

- Men – Kris Bignall, Scott Elsworth, Tu Huyhn, John Richardson
- Women – Lynette "Lyn" Coleman, Fiona Given
- Coaches – Thomas Organ (Head), Ricky Grant

The 1996 result was the best ever for an Australian team in Boccia, however they did not win any medals.

=== 2000 Sydney ===
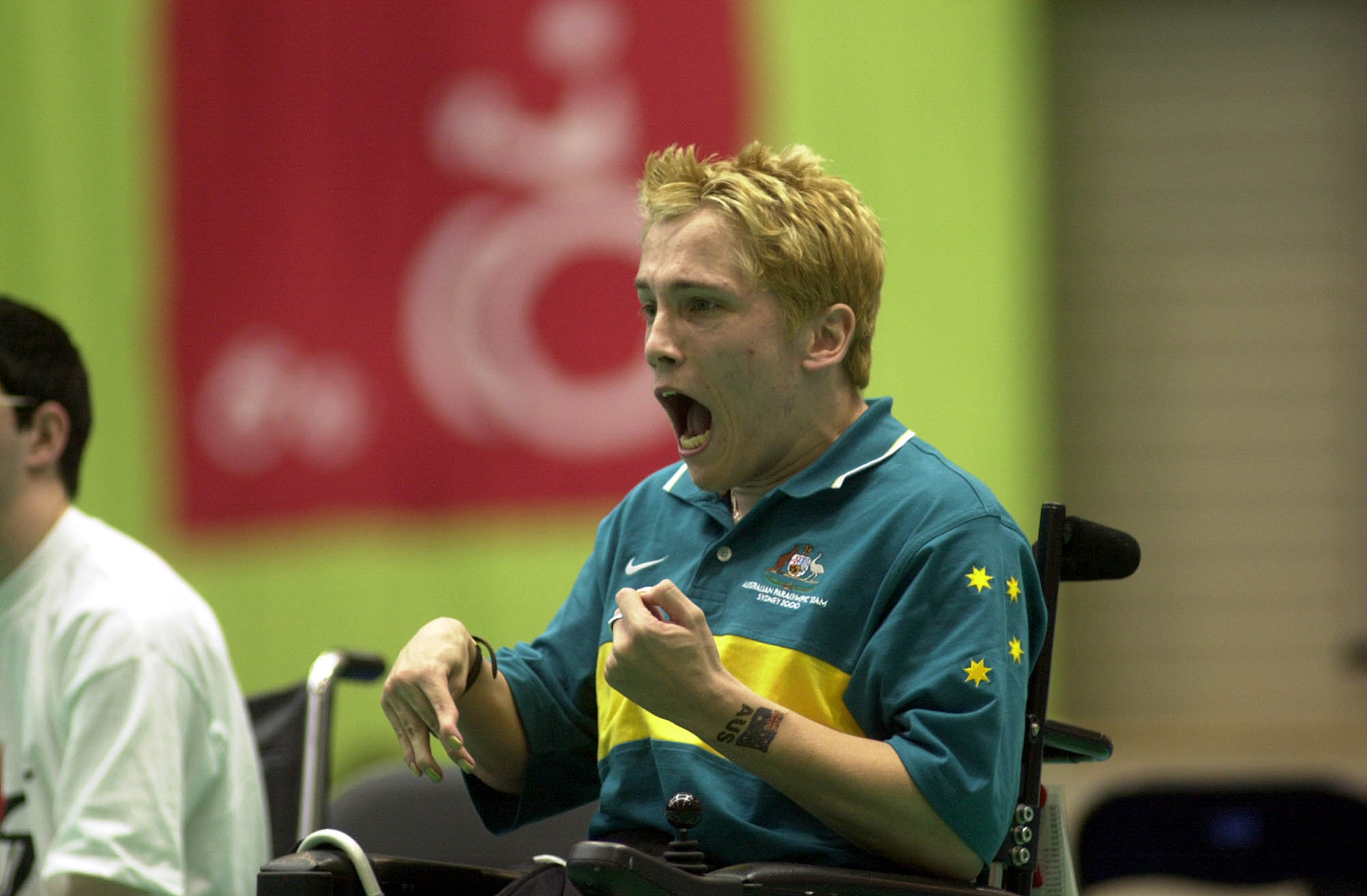
221000 - Boccia Scott Elsworth action - 3b - Sydney 2000 match photo

Australia represented in boccia by:

- Men - Warren Brearley, Scott Elsworth, John Richardson
- Women - Lyn Coleman, Angie McReynolds, Karen Stewart
- Coaches – Joan Stevens (Head), Italo Vigalo
- Officials – Peggy Richardson, Barry Stewart, Sue Beencke, Annette Low, Emily Connell, Carla Brearley, June Kaese

Most athletes did not progress from the first round of pool games. Scott Eslworth was the best performed athlete making the quarter-finals.

=== 2004 Athens ===
Australia did not participate

=== 2008 Beijing ===
Australia did not participate

=== 2012 London ===
Australia did not participate

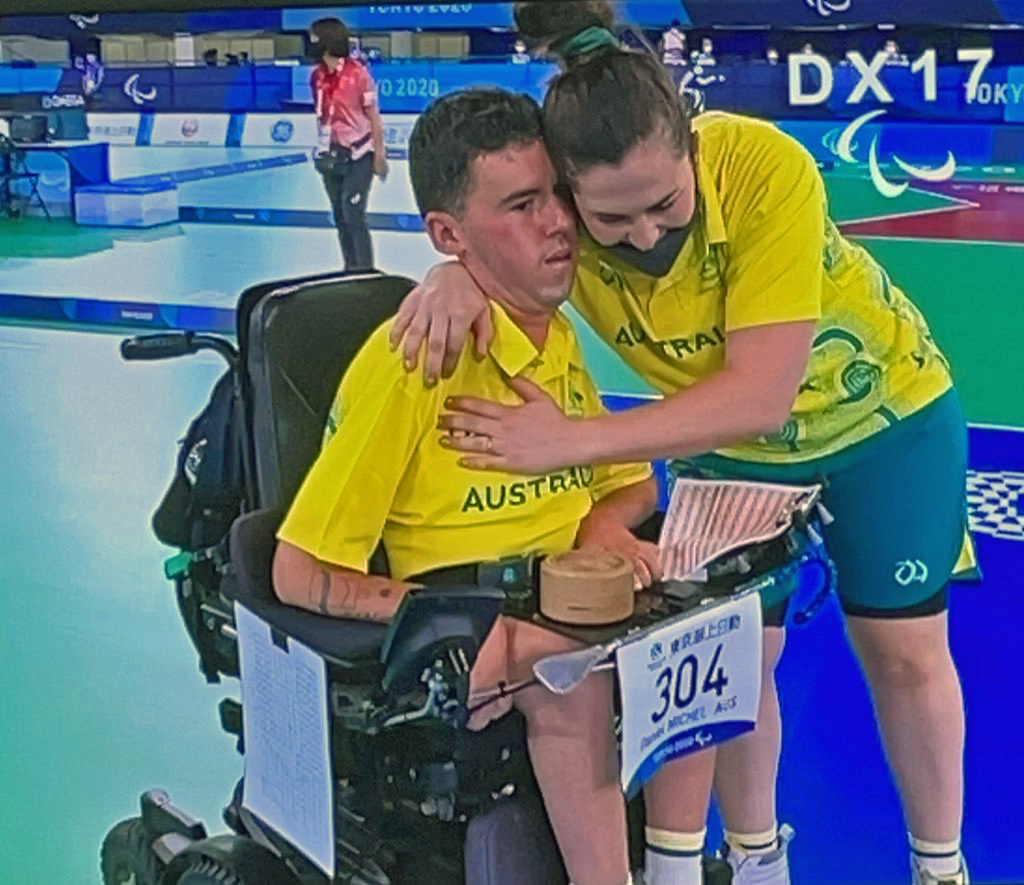
Dan Michel and his ramp assistant Ashlee McClure celebrate after Michel won the bronze medal playoff match at the Tokyo 2020 Paralympic Games

=== 2016 Rio ===
Australia selected Daniel Michel and his ramp assistant Ashlee McClure for their debut Games. Michel is the first player since the 2000 Sydney Paralympics.

Australian Team at 2016 Summer Paralympics Detailed Results

=== 2020 Tokyo ===
Team - Daniel Michel (ramp assistant Ashlee McClure), Spencer Cotie (ramp assistant Zoe Dix) and Jamieson Leeson (ramp assistant Zoe Dix). Officials - Ken Halliday (Head Coach); Caroline Walker (Team Manager); Sarah Skidmore (Carer).

Daniel Michel won the bronze medal in the Mixed individual BC3

=== 2024 Paris ===
Team - Daniel Michel (ramp assistant Ashlee McMaddern) and Jamieson Leeson (ramp assistant Jasmine Haydon)
Officials - Ken Halliday (Head Coach); Caroline Walker (Team Manager); Jessica Michel (Carer), Phoebe Carter (Video analyst).

Daniel Michel and Jamieson Leeson won silver medals.

Australian Team at the 2024 Summer Paralympics Detailed Results

== See also ==
- Boccia at the Summer Paralympics
- Australia at the Paralympics
