= Australian Paralympic Taekwondo Team =

Australia was represented by one athlete in the first Paralympic Taekwondo event at the 2020 Tokyo Paralympics.

== Medal tally ==
Games	Gold	Silver	Bronze	Total
2020 Tokyo	0	0	1	1
Totals (1 entries)	0	0	1	1

== Summer Paralympic Games ==
=== 2020 Tokyo ===
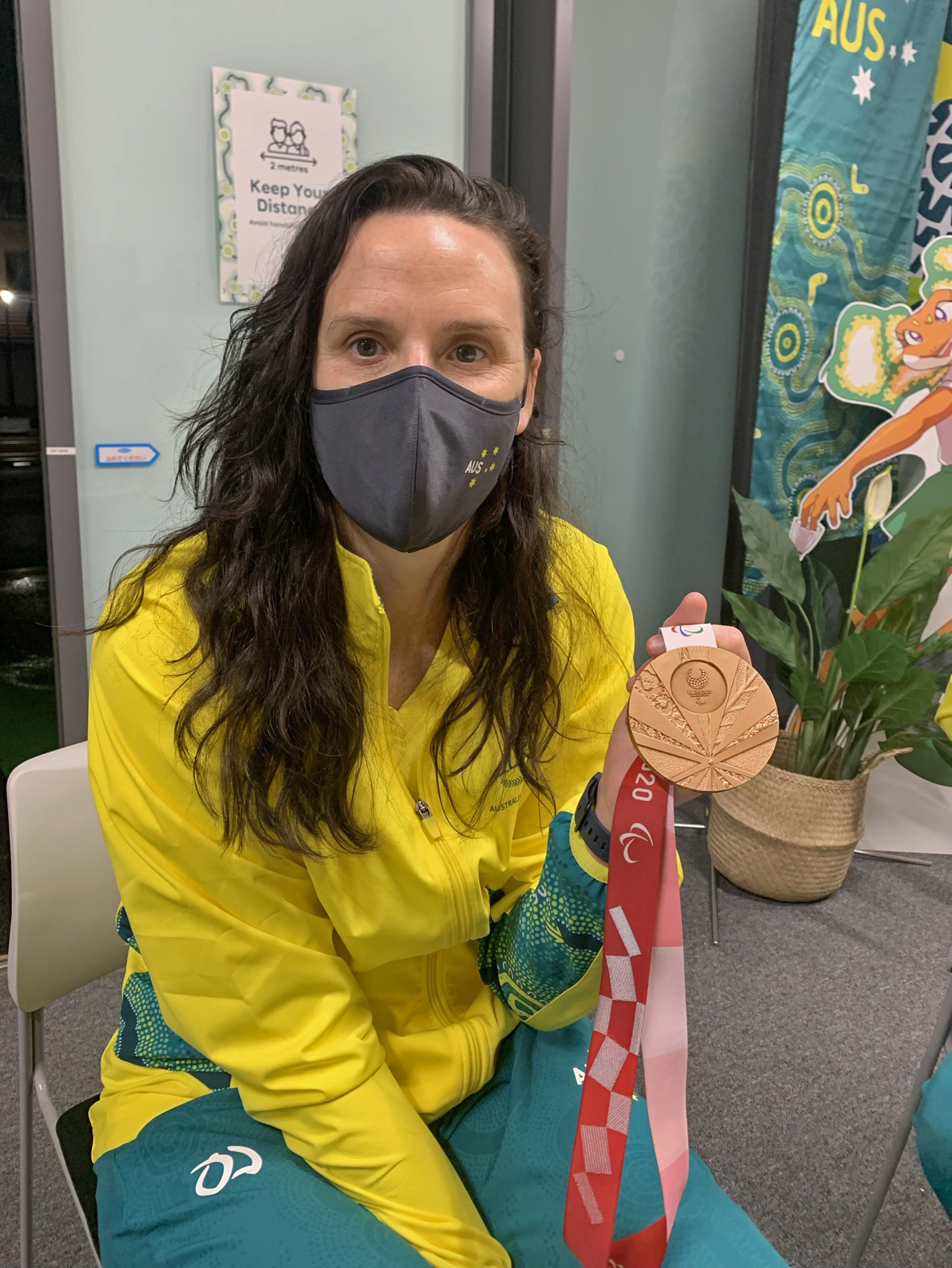
Janine Watson with the bronze medal won at the 2020 Tokyo Paralympics

Australia was represented by:
Women - Janine Watson
Officials - Team Manager - Benjamin Hartmann
Janine Watson won the bronze medal in the Women's +58kg.

Detailed Australian Results
