= Athletics at the 2020 Summer Paralympics – Women's 100 metres T53 =

Women's 100 metres T53 at the XVI Paralympic Games
- Venue: Tokyo National Stadium
- Dates: 1 September 2021 (final)
- Competitors: 9 from 7 nations
- Winning time: 16.29

Medalists
1st place, gold medalist(s)		Gao Fang	China
2nd place, silver medalist(s)		Zhou Hongzhuan	China
3rd place, bronze medalist(s)		Samantha Kinghorn	Great Britain

The women's 100 metres T53 event at the 2020 Summer Paralympics in Tokyo, took place on 1 September 2021.

The T53 category is for wheelchair athletes with normal use of arms and hands, no or limited trunk function, and no leg function.

== Records ==
Prior to the competition, the existing records were as follows:

World record	Huang Lisha (CHN)	16.19	Rio de Janeiro, Brazil	8 September 2016
Paralympic record	Huang Lisha (CHN)	16.19	Rio de Janeiro, Brazil	8 September 2016

Area	Time	Athlete	Nation
Africa	18.51	Olajumoke Annah Olajide	Nigeria
America	16.23	Leann Shannon	United States
Asia	16.19 WR	Huang Lisha	China
Europe	16.21	Samantha Kinghorn	Great Britain
Oceania	16.46	Angie Ballard	Australia

== Results ==
The final took place on 1 September 2021, at 20:37:

Rank	Lane	Name	Nationality	Time	Notes
1st place, gold medalist(s)	3	Gao Fang	China	16.29	SB
2nd place, silver medalist(s)	5	Zhou Hongzhuan	China	16.48	SB
3rd place, bronze medalist(s)	4	Samantha Kinghorn	Great Britain	16.53	
4	7	Jessica Cooper Lewis	Bermuda	16.90	SB
5	9	Hamide Doğangün	Turkey	16.94	SB
6	8	Catherine Debrunner	Switzerland	17.18	
7	6	Angie Ballard	Australia	17.43	
8	1	Kelsey Lefevour	United States	17.56	
9	2	Yen Hoang	United States	18.01	
