= Australian Paralympic Paracanoe Team =

Australia was represented by six athletes in the first Paralympic Paracanoeing event at the 2016 Rio Paralympics.

== Medal tally ==
Games	Gold	Silver	Bronze	Total
2016 Rio	1	1	1	3
2020 Tokyo	2	1	0	3
2024 Paris	1	1	1	3
Totals (3 entries)	4	3	2	9

== Summer Paralympic Games ==
=== 2016 Rio ===
Australia was represented by:

Men - Colin Sieders (d), Curtis McGrath (d), Dylan Littlehales (d)
Women - Jocelyn Neumueller (d), Susan Seipel (d), Amanda Reynolds (d)
Coaches - Andrea King (Head), Guy Power
Officials - Team Leader - Christine Bain, Physiotherapist - Melissa Nolan

Australia won three medals with Curtis McGrath taking gold in Men's KL2, Amanda Reynolds taking silver in the Women's KL3 and Susan Seipel taking bronze in the Women's KL2.

Detailed Australian Results

=== 2020 Tokyo ===
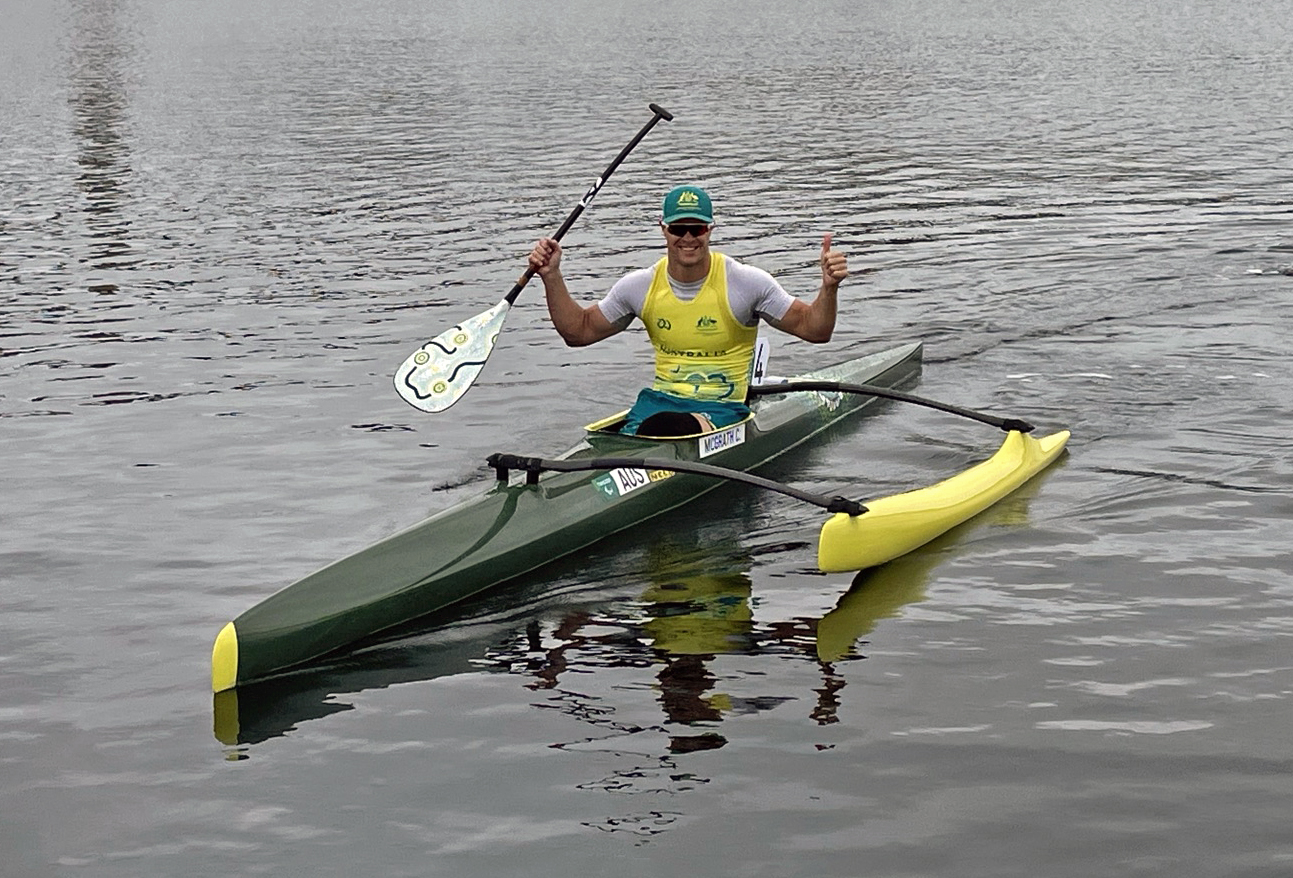
McGrath celebrates gold medal in Men's VL3. at the 2020 Tokyo Paralympics

Australia was represented by:
Men - Curtis McGrath, Dylan Littlehales
Women- Susan Seipel, Amanda Reynolds
Coaches -Shaun Caven, Jake Michael
Officials - Physiotherapist - Kate O'Connell

Australia won three medals with Curtis McGrath taking gold in Men's KL2 and VL3 and Susan Seipel taking silver in the Women's VL3.

Detailed Australian Results

=== 2024 Paris ===
Australia was represented by:
Men - Curtis McGrath, Dylan Littlehales
Women- Susan Seipel
Coaches - Jake Michael, Anna Wood
Officials - Team Manager - Eden Williamson, Physiotherapist - Kate O'Connell

Australia won three medals with Curtis McGrath taking gold in Men's KL2, Dylan Littlehales silver in Men's KL3 and Susan Seipel taking bronze in the Women's VL2.

Detailed Australian Results

== See also ==
- Paracanoe at the Summer Paralympics
- Australia at the Paralympics
