= Yen Hoang =

American wheelchair racer

Personal information
- Born: March 8, 1997 (age 29) Ho Chi Minh City, Vietnam
- Education: University of Illinois Urbana-Champaign

Sport
- Sport: Wheelchair racing
- Disability class: T53

Achievements and titles
- Paralympic finals: 2020
- World finals: 2015
- Regional finals: 2015, 2019
Medal record
Representing United States
Parapan American Games
Gold medal – first place	2019 Lima	800 m T53
Silver medal – second place	2019 Lima	400 m T53
World Marathon Majors
Silver medal – second place	2021 Chicago	Marathon
Bronze medal – third place	2021 Boston	Marathon

Yen Hoang (Vietnamese: Yến Hoàng; born March 8, 1997) is an American wheelchair racer, who won two medals at the 2019 Parapan American Games. She came second at the 2021 Chicago Marathon and third at the 2021 Boston Marathon, and competed at the delayed 2020 Summer Paralympics.

== Personal life ==
Yen Hoang was born in Ho Chi Minh City on March 8, 1997, and then moved to the United States with her family when she was three years old. Hoang has cauda equina syndrome, and has used a wheelchair since the age of four. She started playing wheelchair basketball in middle school, and started track and field events at Evergreen High School in Vancouver, Washington. She has played wheelchair basketball at national youth level. Hoang attended the University of Illinois Urbana-Champaign on a sports scholarship, graduating in business and accounting in 2019. Aside from wheelchair racing, Hoang works for KPMG.

== Career ==
In 2012, Hoang won the 3,200 meter wheelchair race at her school district competition. In 2014, she won the 800 meter and 3,200 meter events at the Tiger Invitational competition. Hoang competed at the 2015 Parapan American Games, in four events, and also at the 2015 IPC Athletics World Championships. At the 2019 Parapan American Games, Hoang won the 800 meters T53 event, and came second in the 400 meters T53 competition. She also came fourth in the final of the 100 meters T53 at the Games. Hoang was the second fastest women finisher at the virtual 2020 New York City Marathon, behind Susannah Scaroni.

In 2021, Hoang came third in the New York Mini 10K wheelchair race. At the delayed 2020 Summer Paralympics, she finished eighth in the final of the 800 meters T53 event. Her time in the semi-final was a personal best. She also competed in the 100 meters T53, 400 meters T53 and 1500 meters T53 events. Hoang came second in the women's wheelchair race at the 2021 Chicago Marathon. It was her third Chicago Marathon, and she had previously finished seventh and 12th in the event. The next day, she came third in the women's wheelchair race at the 2021 Boston Marathon.
