= Natalie Alexander =

Australian wheelchair basketball player

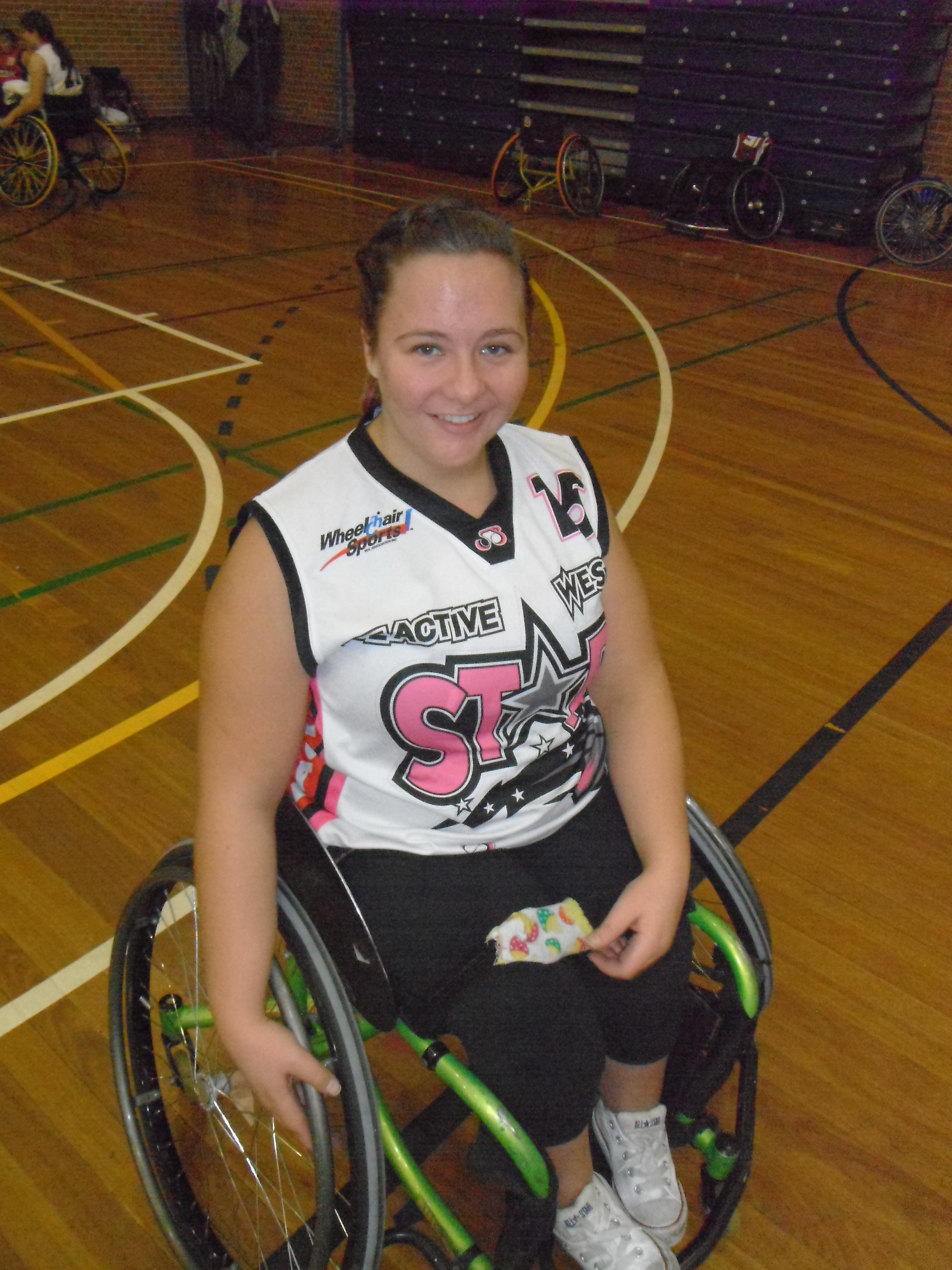
- Natalie Alexander playing wheelchair basketball for the Western Stars

Personal information
- Born: 6 April 1991 (age 35)

Sport
- Country: Australia
- Sport: Wheelchair basketball
- Disability class: 2.5
- Event: Women's team

Natalie Alexander (born 6 April 1991) is a 2.5 point Australian wheelchair basketball player. She represented Australia at the 2020 Summer Paralympics in Tokyo.

== Biography ==
Natalie Alexander was born on 6 April 1991. She has Bachelor of Science and Psychology at the University of Western Australia. Natalie also completed a Masters of Speech Pathology.

== Career ==
A 2.5 point guard. She was a member of the Australian team that won the gold medal in 2013 Osaka Cup and bronze medal at the 2016 Osaka Cup.

She was a member of the Australian teams that won the silver medals at the 2011 and 2015 Women's U25 Wheelchair Basketball World Championship.

She represented Australia at the 2020 Tokyo Paralympics, where the Gliders finished ninth after winning the 9th-10th classification match.
