= Victoria Davies (equestrian) =

Australian equestrian

Personal information
- Born: 21 August 1984 (age 41)

Sport
- Country: Australia
- Sport: Para-equestrian

Victoria "Vic" Davies (born 21 August 1984) is an Australian para-equestrian. She represented Australia at the 2020 Tokyo Paralympics.

== Personal ==
Davies was born on 21 August 1984. At the age of nine, she was diagnosed with the degenerative disease rheumatoid arthritis. After two hip replacements, she was able to get back on a horse at the age of 19. She has had 42 operations, multiple joint replacements, fusions, scarred organs, nerve and spinal cord damage. Her 2016 Paralympics campaign was derailed after being diagnosed with a neck condition called basilar invagination.

Davies and her husband Michael own a horse stud on the New South Wales South Coast.

== Equestrian ==
Davies started riding at the age of three and her passion began early through her parents who were heavily involved in breeding and competing horses. She is classified as Grade II rider. Davies was ranked 12th in the world for the 2020 FEI grade II Para equestrian world rankings and shortlisted for the Tokyo Paralympic Games.

In 2021, Davies dominated Sydney International Three-day Para-dressage Event with her Lusitano stallion Celere (a 14-year-old imported lusitano buckskin stallion) and were named the Grade II winner of the Freestyle competition.

At the 2020 Tokyo Paralympics, she rode Celere to ninth in Individual championship test grade II.
