= Mary Friday =

Australian wheelchair basketball player

Sport
- Country: Australia
- Sport: Wheelchair basketball
- Disability class: 1.0
- Event: Women's team

Mary Friday is a 1 point Australian wheelchair basketball player. She represented Australia at the 2020 Summer Paralympics in Tokyo.

== Biography ==
Friday emigrated to Australia from her country of birth in Nigeria when she was a child. She lives in Perth, Western Australia.

== Career ==
A 1 point player, she was a member of the Australian teams that won the silver medal at the 2019 Women's U25 Wheelchair Basketball World Championship. She also represented Australia at the 2019 Osaka Cup. She is coached by Australian Paralympian Brad Ness.

At the 2020 Tokyo Paralympics, the Gliders finished ninth after winning the 9th-10th classification match.
