= Wayne Phipps =

Australian Paralympic athlete

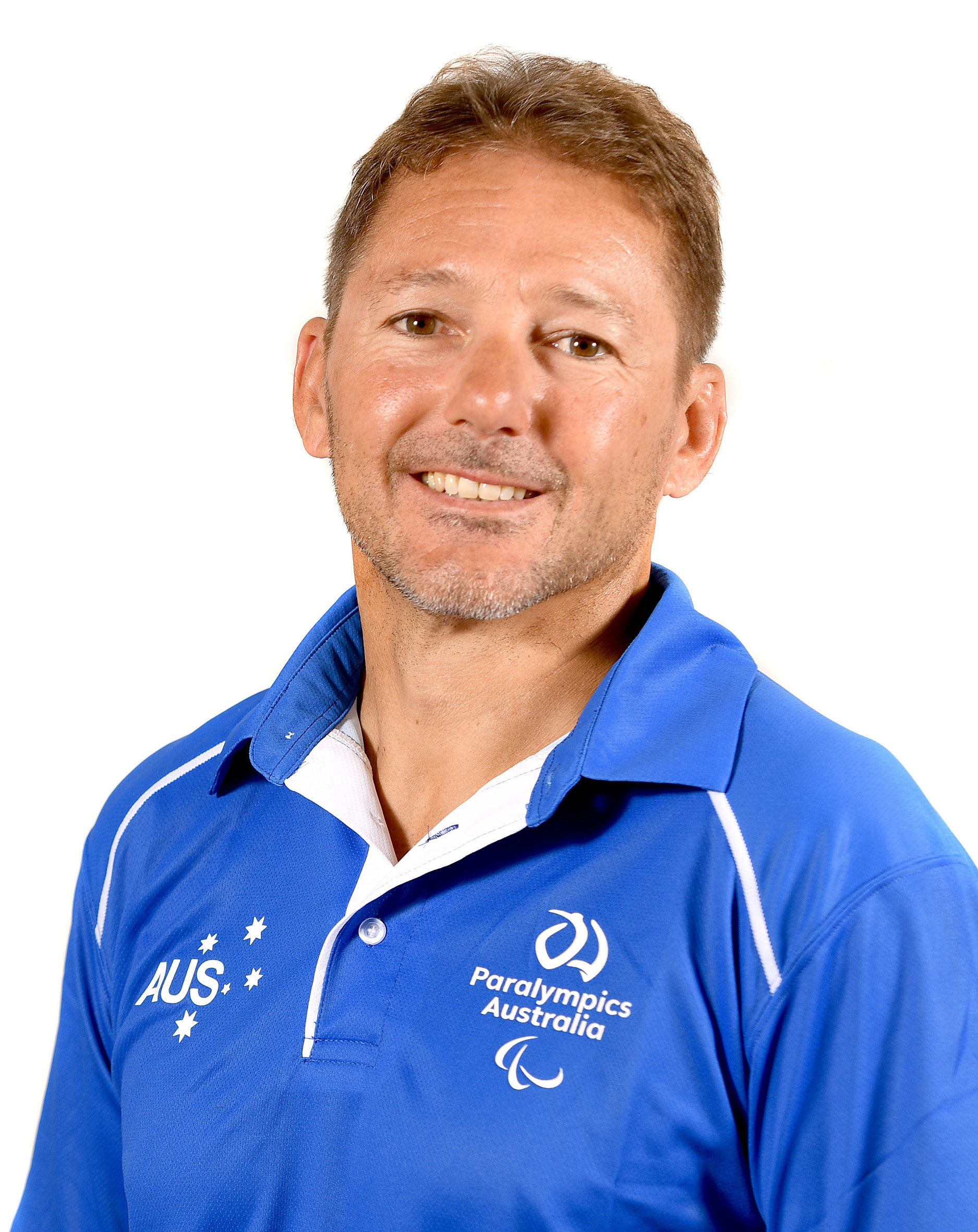
- Wayne Phipps in 2019

Personal information
- Nationality: Australian
- Born: 25 June 1973 (age 53)
- Occupation: Judoka

Sport
- Country: Australia
- Sport: Judo

Wayne Phipps (born 25 June 1973) is an Australian Paralympic judoka. He competed at the 2020 Summer Paralympics.

== Personal ==
Phipps was born on 25 June 1973 in South Africa. He moved to Australia in 2010. In 2015, he was diagnosed with an eye condition.

== Judo ==
He started judo at the age of eight. In his teenage years, he won national titles and in his twenties represented South Africa at world championships. After his diagnosis, his coach Carlo Knoester at the Kano Judo Schools in Perth told him about Paralympic judo.

He is judo classification is B3. Phipps competed for the first time in Para-judo at the World Championships in Portugal in 2018. At the 2021 IBSA Visually Impaired Judo in Warwick, he finished sixth in -66 kg class.

Australia had not been represented in Paralympic judo since the Beijing 2008 Paralympics. At the Tokyo 2020 Paralympics Phipps qualified in the men’s half-lightweight category Men's 66 kg. He lost to Munkhbat Aajim of Mongolia in the preliminary round.
