= Jamieson Leeson =

Australian boccia player (born 2003)

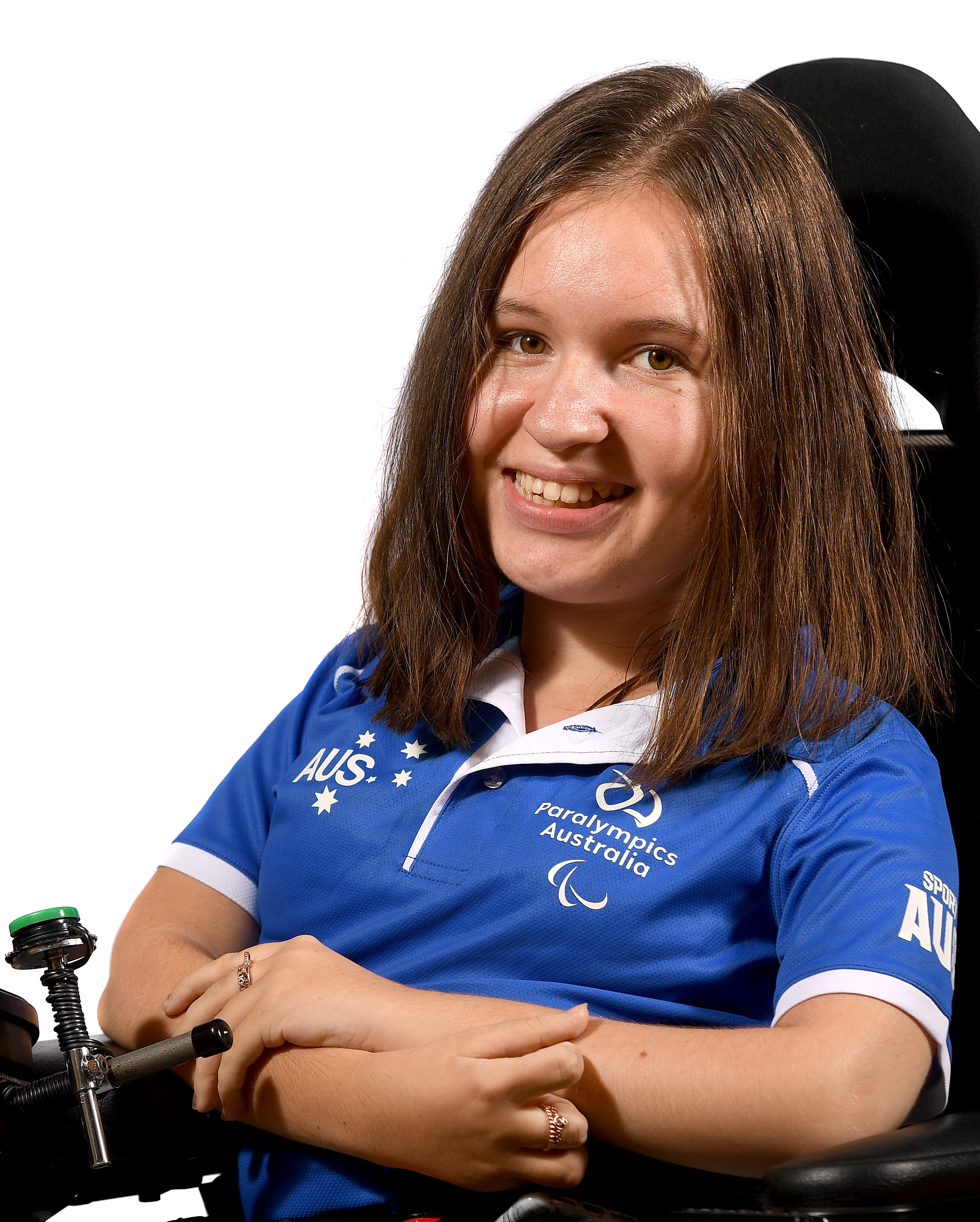
- Jamieson Leeson in 2019

Personal information
- Nationality: Australia
- Born: 18 March 2003 (age 23)

Sport
- Sport: Boccia
- Disability class: BC3
Medal record
Boccia
Paralympic Games
Silver medal – second place	2024 Paris	Individual BC3
World Championships
Gold medal – first place	2022 Rio	Mixed Pairs BC3
Silver medal – second place	2022 Rio	Women's BC3

Jamieson Leeson (born 18 March 2003) is an Australian boccia player. She represented Australia at the 2020 Tokyo Paralympics. She won a gold and silver medal at the 2022 World Championships.

== Early life ==
She was born on 18 March 2003 with spinal muscular atrophy. She uses a wheelchair and her mother, Amanda, is her primary carer. The rugby league's Men of League Foundation provided her family with a customised van with specialist wheelchair lift to help her daily transport. She grew up in Dunedoo, New South Wales and attended Dunedoo Central School. In 2024, she is studying a Bachelor of Economics full-time at the University of New South Wales.

== Boccia ==
She began playing in 2018 where she was scouted in a school's knock out competition in Orange, New South Wales and trains in Sydney under Australia's Boccia Head Coach Ken Halliday. In March 2019, Jamieson competed in her first ever boccia competition, winning gold in pairs. She has won silver medals in the singles and pairs at the 2019 Boccia Australia National Titles.

In May 2019, she won a bronze medal in the pairs at the Hong Kong World Open. In July, she competed in both the pairs and individual events at the Seoul Asia-Oceania Regional Championships, winning her first ever international individual game against a Paralympic gold medalist. At just 16, Jamieson has been the youngest person ever to represent Australia in boccia. In 2021, she received a Tier 3 Scholarship within the Sport Australia Hall of Fame Scholarship & Mentoring Program.

At the 2020 Tokyo Paralympics, she teamed with Daniel Michel and Spencer Cotie in the Mixed Pairs BC3, where they won 2 and lost 2 matches but failed to qualify for the quarter-finals.

Leeson won the silver medal in the Women's BC3 and the gold medal in the Mixed Pairs BC3 at the 2022 World Championships in Rio de Janeiro. She lost 2–6 to Anna Costa in the final of the Women's BC3.

She competed at the 2024 Summer Paralympics in Paris with her ramp assistant Jasmine Haydon. She won silver in the Women's Individual Bc3, Australia's best ever performance in boccia. Leeson and Daniel Michel lost in the Mixed pairs BC3 quarter-finals.

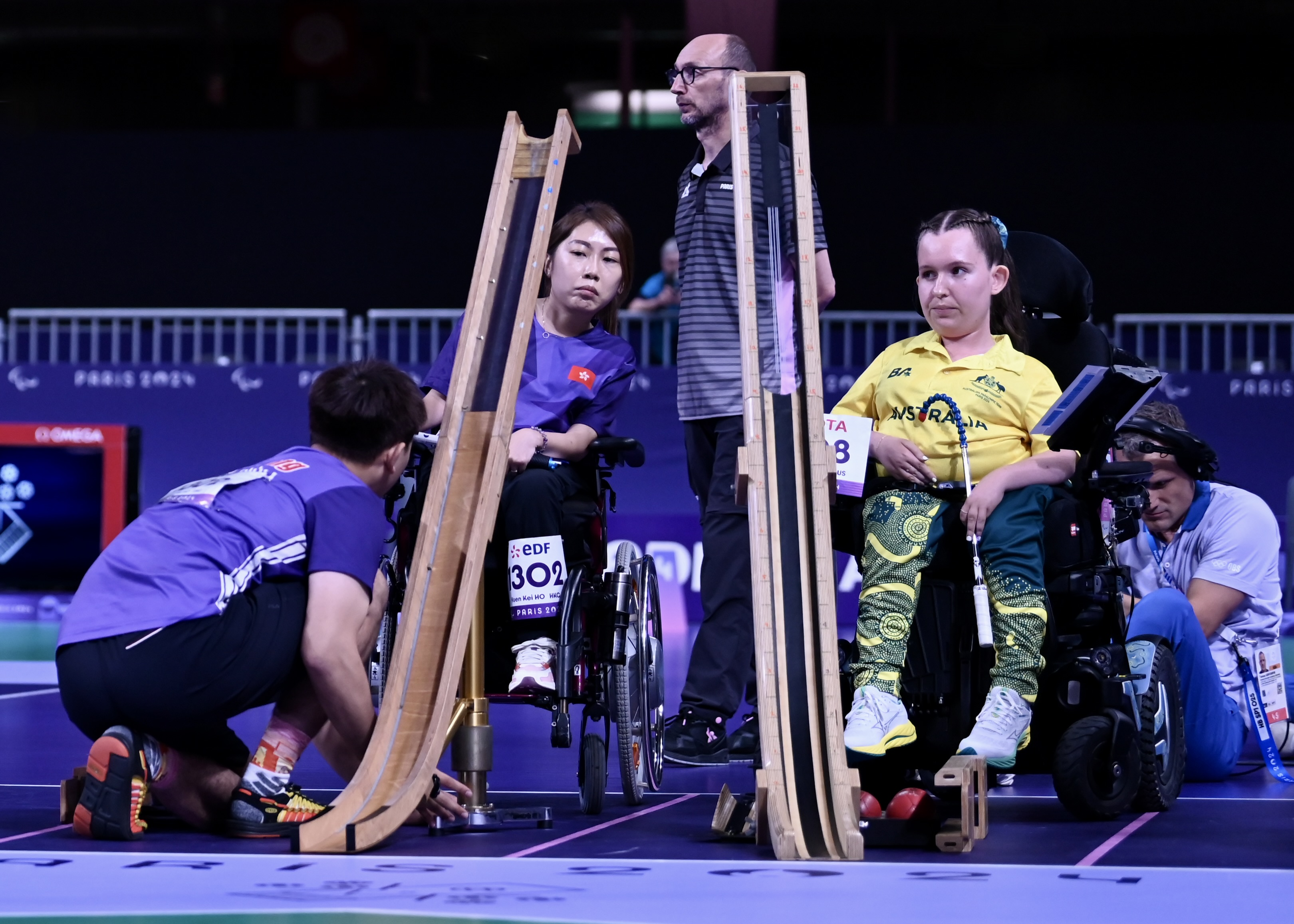
Leeson competing at the 2024 Paris Paralympiics

== Recognition ==
In 2023, Leeson with Daniel Michel was awarded the Sport NSW Team of the Year with a Disability and Australian Institute of Sport Performance Awards Team of the Year.
