= Anne Wafula Strike =

Anne Wafula Strike MBE (born 8 May 1969) is a Harlow-based British Paralympic wheelchair racer.

Wafula Strike was born in Mihuu in Bungoma, Kenya, and contracted polio at the age of two, resulting in a later Royal National Orthopaedic Hospital diagnosis of below T7 paralysis. Arriving in the UK in April 2000, she was introduced to wheelchair racing in 2002 and in 2004 became the first Kenyan wheelchair racer to represent her country, competing in the T53 400m finals at the Paralympics in Athens. Following a successful application for British citizenship in 2006, she became a member of Team GB and, after reclassification, now competes in the T54 racing category as a British athlete.

A past winner of the BBC's 'My Story' competition, her autobiography In my Dreams I Dance was published by HarperCollins in 2010.

In 2013, Wafula Strike was featured in Paul Stenning's Success - By Those Who've Made It, alongside many celebrities and notable people. Hers was the last personal biography featured in the book, which Stenning explained was because her story was the most powerful and the greatest example of success.

She was appointed Member of the Order of the British Empire (MBE) in the 2014 Birthday Honours for services to disability sport and charity.

In January 2017, while on a CrossCountry train, she was unable to reach a toilet on time due to sitting in a wheelchair. She lost control of her bladder and urinated into her clothing. In the aftermath, she criticised CrossCountry for failing to provide a working disabled accessible toilet on the train.

Anne has one child - named Timothy - with her husband Norman.

In 2020 Wafula was named as a special envoy to the Commonwealth by Commonwealth Secretary-General Patricia Scotland.
