= Spencer Cotie =

Australian boccia player (born 1999)

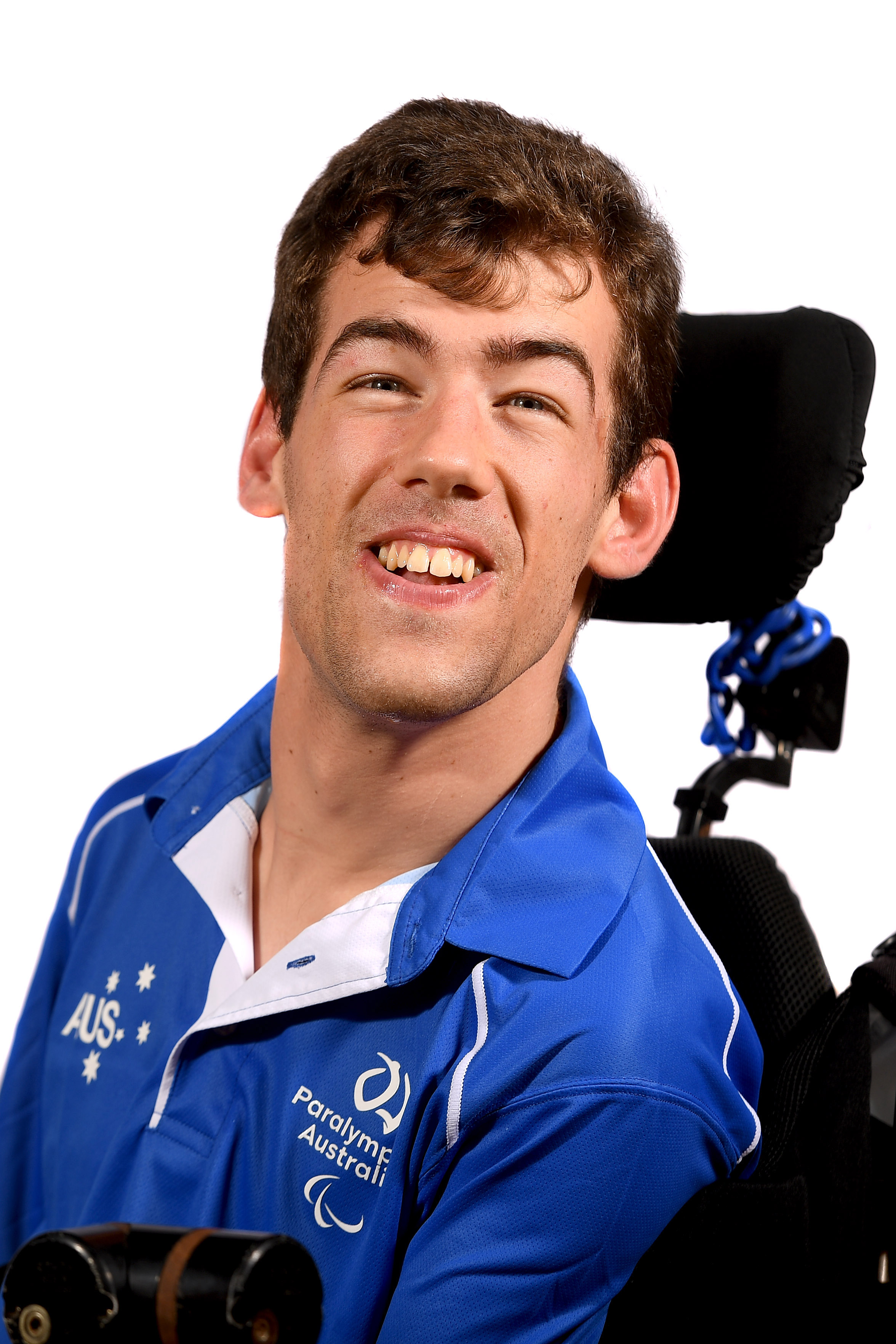
- Spencer Cotie in 2019

Personal information
- Nationality: Australia
- Born: 18 April 1999 (age 27)

Sport
- Sport: Boccia
- Disability class: BC3
Medal record
Boccia
World Championships
Silver medal – second place	2018 Liverpool	Mixed BC3

Spencer Cotie (born 18 April 1999) is an Australian boccia player. He represented Australia at the 2020 Tokyo Paralympics.

== Early life ==
He was born on 18 April 1999, with cerebral palsy. He is unable to walk or speak and communicates through typing on an iPad. He attended Killarney Heights High School and is studying a Bachelor of Laws at Macquarie University.

== Boccia ==
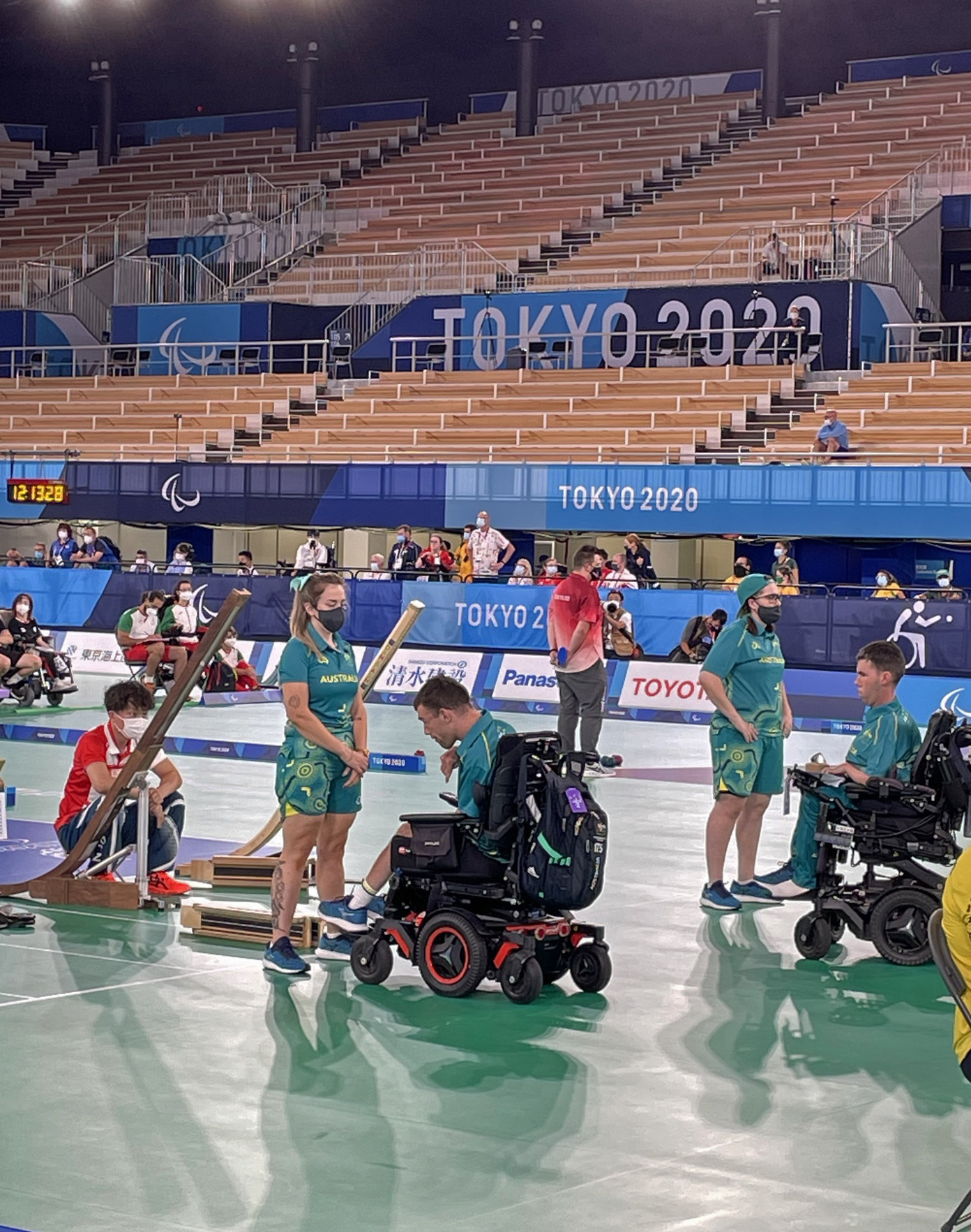
Spencer Cotie (left) and Daniel Michel compete in the BC3 mixed pairs at the Tokyo 2020 Paralympics.

Cotie first represented Australia in 2014 at the BISFed World Open in Hong Kong, where he and Daniel Michel won the silver medal in the mixed pairs BC3. In 2017, he won the bronze medal in the mixed singles BC3 at the 2017 BISFed Regional Open Championships in Dubai, UAE.

Cotie and Michel won the silver medal in the mixed pairs BC3 at the 2018 BISFed World Boccia Championships in Liverpool, England. At the end of 2018, Cotie and Michel were ranked world number three.

At the 2020 Tokyo Paralympics, Cotie in the Mixed Individual BC3 Pool Matches beat Stefania Ferrando of Argentine 4-1 and then also beat Jamie McCowan of Great Britain 5–2. He then lost to Scott McCowan 4–3. In spite of winning two out of three matches, he was still eliminated and failed to qualify for the quarter-finals. He teamed with Daniel Michel and Jamieson Leeson in the Mixed Pairs BC3, where they won 2 and lost 2 matches but failed to qualify for the quarter-finals.
