= Gao Fang =

Chinese Paralympic athlete

Personal information
- Native name: 高芳
- Born: 6 March 1988 (age 38) Hancheng, China

Sport
- Country: China
- Sport: Para-athletics
Medal record
Women's para-athletics
Representing China
Paralympic Games
Gold medal – first place	2020 Tokyo	100 m T53
Bronze medal – third place	2024 Paris	100 m T53
World Championships
Gold medal – first place	2019 Dubai	100 m T53
Silver medal – second place	2024 Kobe	100 m T53
Silver medal – second place	2024 Kobe	400 m T53
Silver medal – second place	2024 Kobe	800 m T53
Bronze medal – third place	2023 Paris	100 m T53

Gao Fang (Chinese: 高 芳; born 6 March 1988) is a Chinese Paralympic athlete.

== Career ==
She won the gold medal in the women's 100 metres T53 event at the 2020 Summer Paralympics held in Tokyo, Japan.
