= Macau at the 2024 Summer Paralympics =

- IPC code: MAC
- NPC: Associação Recreativa dos Deficientes de Macau

in Paris, France August 28, 2024 – September 8, 2024
- Competitors: 1 in 1 sport
- Flag bearer: Chio Hao Lei
- Medals: Gold 0 Silver 0 Bronze 0 Total 0

Summer Paralympics appearances (overview)
- 1988; 1992; 1996; 2000; 2004; 2008; 2012; 2016; 2020; 2024

Macau competed at the 2024 Summer Paralympics in Paris, France, from 28 August to 8 September 2024. This is the nation's tenth time competing at the Summer Paralympic Games after it made its debut at the 1988 Summer Paralympics, returning after missing the 2020 games in Tokyo. The delegation consisted of only one competitor in athletics.

== Competitors ==
The following is the list of number of competitors in the Games.

Sport	Men	Women	Total
Athletics	0	1	1
Total	0	1	1

== Athletics ==
Athlete	Event	Final	
Athlete	Event	Result	Rank
Chio Hao Lei	Women's long jump T20	4.17	15

== See also ==
- Macau at the Paralympics
