= Swimming at the 2020 Summer Paralympics – Men's 200 metre individual medley SM14 =

Men's 200 metre individual medley SM14 at the XVI Paralympic Games
- Venue: Tokyo Aquatics Centre
- Dates: 31 August 2021
- Competitors: 18 from 13 nations

Medalists
1st place, gold medalist(s)		Reece Dunn	Great Britain
2nd place, silver medalist(s)		Gabriel Bandeira	Brazil
3rd place, bronze medalist(s)		Vasyl Krainyk	Ukraine

The men's 200 metre individual medley SM14 event at the 2020 Paralympic Games took place on 31 August 2021, at the Tokyo Aquatics Centre.

== Heats ==
The swimmers with the top eight times, regardless of heat, advanced to the final.

Rank	Heat	Lane	Name	Nationality	Time	Notes
1	1	4	Vasyl Krainyk	Ukraine	2:11.11	Q
2	2	4	Reece Dunn	Great Britain	2:12.61	Q
3	2	5	Marc Evers	Netherlands	2:13.10	Q
4	2	6	Nicholas Bennett	Canada	2:13.94	Q
4	3	3	Mikhail Kuliabin	RPC	2:13.94	Q
6	3	5	Gabriel Bandeira	Brazil	2:15.35	Q
7	1	3	Robert Isak Jonsson	Iceland	2:15.37	Q
8	3	4	Dai Tokairin	Japan	2:15.54	Q
9	1	6	Jordan Catchpole	Great Britain	2:16.35	
10	1	5	Liam Schluter	Australia	2:16.51	
11	3	2	Naohide Yamaguchi	Japan	2:17.43	
12	1	2	Lawrence Sapp	United States	2:17.89	
13	2	2	Lee Juyoung	South Korea	2:18.75	
14	3	6	Tang Wai-lok	Hong Kong	2:18.87	
15	3	7	Misha Palazzo	Italy	2:19.95	
16	2	7	Joao Pedro Brutos de Oliveira	Brazil	2:21.20	
17	1	7	Parker Egbert	United States	2:22.58	
18	2	3	Keichi Nakajima	Japan	2:23.57	

== Final ==
200m individual medley final
Rank	Lane	Name	Nationality	Time	Notes
1st place, gold medalist(s)	5	Reece Dunn	Great Britain	2:08.02	WR
2nd place, silver medalist(s)	7	Gabriel Bandeira	Brazil	2:09.56	AM
3rd place, bronze medalist(s)	4	Vasyl Krainyk	Ukraine	2:09.92	
4	8	Dai Tokairin	Japan	2:11.29	
5	2	Mikhail Kuliabin	RPC	2:12.00	
6	1	Robert Isak Jonsson	Iceland	2:12.89	
7	6	Nicholas Bennett	Canada	2:13.21	
8	3	Marc Evers	Netherlands	2:13.25	
