= Swimming at the 2016 Summer Paralympics – Men's 200 metre individual medley SM14 =

Men's 200 metre individual medley SM14 at the XV Paralympic Games
- Venue: Olympic Aquatics Stadium
- Dates: 17 September 2016
- Competitors: 20 from 13 nations

Medalists
1st place, gold medalist(s)		Marc Evers	Netherlands
2nd place, silver medalist(s)		Thomas Hamer	Great Britain
3rd place, bronze medalist(s)		Keichi Nakajima	Japan

The Men's 200 metre individual medley SM14 event at the 2016 Paralympic Games took place on 17 September 2016, at the Olympic Aquatics Stadium. Three heats were held. The swimmers with the eight fastest times advanced to the final.

== Heats ==
=== Heat 1 ===
11:10 17 September 2016:

Rank	Lane	Name	Nationality	Time	Notes
1	3	Keichi Nakajima	Japan	2:16.00	Q
2	6	Liam Schluter	Australia	2:18.59	Q
3	5	Gordie Michie	Canada	2:19.85	Q
4	7	Daniel Fox	Australia	2:21.55	
5	4	Wai Lok Tang	Hong Kong	2:22.14	
6	2	Felipe Vila Real	Brazil	2:23.06	

=== Heat 2 ===
11:15 17 September 2016:

Rank	Lane	Name	Nationality	Time	Notes
1	4	Thomas Hamer	Great Britain	2:16.28	Q
2	3	Yasuhiro Tanaka	Japan	2:20.41	
3	6	Yang Mook Jung	South Korea	2:21.29	
4	5	In Kook Lee	South Korea	2:22.56	
5	7	Joshua Alford	Australia	2:22.99	
6	1	Yu Chia Chen	Macau	2:32.26	
7	2	Alberto Vera	Venezuela	2:35.14	

=== Heat 3 ===
11:19 17 September 2016:

Rank	Lane	Name	Nationality	Time	Notes
1	4	Marc Evers	Netherlands	2:12.07	PR Q
2	5	Won Sang Cho	South Korea	2:17.40	Q
3	2	Takuya Tsugawa	Japan	2:18.45	Q
4	3	Jon Margeir Sverrisson	Iceland	2:19.56	Q
5	6	Wa Kit Choi	Hong Kong	2:20.64	
6	7	Adam Ismael Wenham	Norway	2:22.85	
7	1	Elian Araya	Argentina	2:26.97	

== Final ==
19:51 17 September 2016:

Rank	Lane	Name	Nationality	Time	Notes
1st place, gold medalist(s)	4	Marc Evers	Netherlands	2:10.29	PR
2nd place, silver medalist(s)	3	Thomas Hamer	Great Britain	2:12.88	
3rd place, bronze medalist(s)	5	Keichi Nakajima	Japan	2:15.46	
4	6	Won Sang Cho	South Korea	2:17.76	
5	2	Takuya Tsugawa	Japan	2:18.03	
6	1	Jon Margeir Sverrisson	Iceland	2:18.61	
7	7	Liam Schluter	Australia	2:18.85	
8	8	Gordie Michie	Canada	2:18.88	
