= Swimming at the 2016 Summer Paralympics – Men's 200 metre freestyle S14 =

Men's 200 metre freestyle S14 at the XV Paralympic Games
- Venue: Olympic Aquatics Stadium
- Dates: 11 September 2016
- Competitors: 17 from 11 nations

Medalists
1st place, gold medalist(s)		Wai Lok Tang	Hong Kong
2nd place, silver medalist(s)		Thomas Hamer	Great Britain
3rd place, bronze medalist(s)		Daniel Fox	Australia

The Men's 200 metre freestyle S14 event at the 2016 Paralympic Games took place on 11 September 2016, at the Olympic Aquatics Stadium. Three heats were held. The swimmers with the eight fastest times advanced to the final.

== Heats ==
=== Heat 1 ===
10:30 11 September 2016:

Rank	Lane	Name	Nationality	Time	Notes
1	4	Thomas Hamer	Great Britain	1:57.31	PR Q
2	3	Keichi Nakajima	Japan	2:00.38	Q
3	6	Felipe Vila Real	Brazil	2:01.11	Q
4	5	Joshua Alford	Australia	2:01.36	
5	2	Yannick Vandeput	Belgium	2:08.41	

=== Heat 2 ===
10:34 11 September 2016:

Rank	Lane	Name	Nationality	Time	Notes
1	5	Liam Schluter	Australia	1:58.95	Q
2	4	Jon Margeir Sverrisson	Iceland	2:00.01	Q
3	3	Won Sang Cho	South Korea	2:01.01	Q
4	6	Koki Sakakura	Japan	2:01.44	
5	2	Wa Kit Choi	Hong Kong	2:05.34	
6	7	Yu Chia Chen	Macau	2:12.11	

=== Heat 3 ===
10:38 11 September 2016:

Rank	Lane	Name	Nationality	Time	Notes
1	4	Daniel Fox	Australia	1:57.19	PR Q
2	5	Wai Lok Tang	Hong Kong	1:57.44	Q
3	6	Satoru Miyazaki	Japan	2:01.39	
4	3	In Kook Lee	South Korea	2:01.86	
5	2	Gordie Michie	Canada	2:06.46	
6	7	Adam Ismael Wenham	Norway	2:07.56	

== Final ==
18:29 11 September 2016:

Rank	Lane	Name	Nationality	Time	Notes
1st place, gold medalist(s)	3	Wai Lok Tang	Hong Kong	1:56.32	PR
2nd place, silver medalist(s)	5	Thomas Hamer	Great Britain	1:56.58	
3rd place, bronze medalist(s)	4	Daniel Fox	Australia	1:56.69	
4	2	Jon Margeir Sverrisson	Iceland	1:57.50	
5	6	Liam Schluter	Australia	1:59.38	
6	7	Keichi Nakajima	Japan	2:00.61	
7	1	Won Sang Cho	South Korea	2:00.83	
8	8	Felipe Vila Real	Brazil	2:02.33	
