= Swimming at the 2020 Summer Paralympics – Men's 200 metre freestyle S14 =

Men's 200 metre freestyle S14 at the XVI Paralympic Games
- Venue: Tokyo Aquatics Centre
- Dates: 27 August 2021
- Competitors: 17 from 10 nations

Medalists
1st place, gold medalist(s)		Reece Dunn	Great Britain
2nd place, silver medalist(s)		Gabriel Bandeira	Brazil
3rd place, bronze medalist(s)		Viacheslav Emeliantsev	RPC

The men's 200 metre freestyle S14 event at the 2020 Paralympic Games took place on 27 August 2021, at the Tokyo Aquatics Centre.

== Heats ==
The swimmers with the top eight times, regardless of heat, advanced to the final.

Rank	Heat	Lane	Name	Nationality	Time	Notes
1	1	5	Jordan Catchpole	Great Britain	1:56.81	Q
2	3	4	Reece Dunn	Great Britain	1:57.30	Q
3	3	5	Gabriel Bandeira	Brazil	1:57.73	Q
4	3	3	Viacheslav Emeliantsev	RPC	1:57.76	Q
5	2	4	Liam Schluter	Australia	1:58.08	Q
6	2	5	Ricky Betar	Australia	1:58.18	Q
7	3	6	Mikhail Kuliabin	RPC	1:58.25	Q
8	1	3	Nicholas Bennett	Canada	1:58.49	Q
9	2	2	Misha Palazzo	Italy	1:58.63	
10	2	3	Tang Wai-lok	Hong Kong	1:59.77	
11	1	6	Felipe Vila Real	Brazil	2:02.13	
12	3	2	Satoru Miyazaki	Japan	2:02.93	
13	1	2	Lee Inkook	South Korea	2:03.16	
14	3	7	Lee Juyoung	South Korea	2:03.68	
15	2	6	Keichi Nakajima	Japan	2:04.00	
16	2	7	Nathan Maillet	France	2:04.44	
	1	4	Thomas Hamer	Great Britain	DNS	

== Final ==
200m freestyle final
Rank	Lane	Name	Nationality	Time	Notes
1st place, gold medalist(s)	5	Reece Dunn	Great Britain	1:52.40	WR
2nd place, silver medalist(s)	3	Gabriel Bandeira	Brazil	1:52.74	
3rd place, bronze medalist(s)	6	Viacheslav Emeliantsev	RPC	1:55.58	
4	2	Liam Schluter	Australia	1:55.67	
5	4	Jordan Catchpole	Great Britain	1:56.33	
6	8	Nicholas Bennett	Canada	1:56.52	
7	7	Ricky Betar	Australia	1:56.70	
8	1	Mikhail Kuliabin	RPC	1:56.74	
