= 2019 Australian Swimming Championships =

- Host city: Adelaide, South Australia
- Date: 7–12 April
- Venue: South Australia Aquatic and Leisure Centre
- Events: 64 (men: 31; women: 31, mixed: 2)

The 2019 Australian Swimming Championships were held from 7 to 12 April 2019 at the South Australia Aquatic and Leisure Centre in Adelaide, South Australia.

Following Australia's performance at the 2016 Rio Olympics where 29 medals were won and finishing 10th on the medal tally, Swimming Australia announced in the February 2017 that the timing of the selection trials would be modified. Historically, the trials were held in April several months before the Olympics were held. This will be now changed to follow the American model where the trials are held six weeks before. The 2019 Australian World Swimming Trials will be held at the Brisbane Aquatics Centre in June 2019 and will be selection trials for the 2019 World Aquatics Championships in Gwangju, South Korea.

This event doubled up as the national trials for the 2019 World Para Swimming Championships in London, the 2019 Summer Universiade in Naples, Italy and the 2019 FINA World Junior Swimming Championships in Budapest, Hungary.

There was an increase in the number of events contested from 63 to 64 from the 2018 National Championships with addition of the mixed 4 × 100 m medley relay. This was due to the IOC announcing in June 2017 that this event as well as the men's 800 m freestyle and the women's 1500 m freestyle events will be added to the Olympic swimming program at the Tokyo 2020 Games.

Emily Seebohm chose to miss this meet to participate in the inaugural FINA Champions Swim Series event in Guangzhou, China, while Thomas Fraser-Holmes was away competing at the Helsinki Swim Meet and Bergen Swim Festival. Mack Horton was forced out due to a shoulder injury.

During night three of the championships, Cate Campbell on behalf of Swimming Australia paid tribute to Kenneth To who died a few weeks prior.

Defending women's 200 metre backstroke champion Kaylee McKeown was disqualified during the heats of the event. She was permitted to swim a time trial where she stopped the clock at 2:08.56 well ahead of Minna Atherton's winning time of 2:11.18 in the final.

The legends relay was a mixed 4 × 50 m freestyle event swum on the penultimate night of the meet. The team were:

- Team Bramham - Andrew Abood, Brooke Hanson, Sam Bramham and Robert van der Zant
- Team Klim - Michael Klim, Dimity Douglas, Sally Hunter, Phil Rogers
- Team Trickett - Christian Sprenger, Linley Frame, Libby Trickett, Bill Kirby
- Team Schipper - Brenton Rickard, Anna McVann, Jessicah Schipper, Craig Stevens

The event was won by Team Bramham in a time of 1:47.14, followed by Team Schipper (1:49.72), Team Trickett (1:50.01) and Team Klim (1:52.54).

== Schedule ==
Legend
Key	H	½	F	TF
Value	Heats	Semifinals	Final	Timed final

M = Morning session, E = Evening session

Men
Date →	7 Apr		8 Apr		9 Apr		10 Apr		11 Apr		12 Apr	
Event ↓	M	E	M	E	M	E	M	E	M	E	M	E
50 m freestyle											H	F
100 m freestyle			H	F								
200 m freestyle							H	F				
400 m freestyle	H	F										
800 m freestyle			TF	TF								
1500 m freestyle												TF
50 m backstroke									H	F		
100 m backstroke	H	F										
200 m backstroke											H	F
50 m breaststroke									H	F		
100 m breaststroke					H	F						
200 m breaststroke			H	F								
50 m butterfly			H	F								
100 m butterfly	H	F										
200 m butterfly											H	F
200 m individual medley					H	F						
400 m individual medley							H	F				
4 × 100 m freestyle relay						TF						
4 × 200 m freestyle relay								TF				
4 × 100 m medley relay										TF		

Men's multiclass
Date →	7 Apr		8 Apr		9 Apr		10 Apr		11 Apr		12 Apr	
Event ↓	M	E	M	E	M	E	M	E	M	E	M	E
50 m freestyle									H	F		
100 m freestyle											H	F
200 m freestyle							H	F				
400 m freestyle	H	F										
50 m backstroke					H	F						
100 m backstroke			H	F								
50 m breaststroke	H	F										
100 m breaststroke							H	F				
50 m butterfly			H	F								
100 m butterfly									H	F		
200 m individual medley					H	F						

Mixed
Date →	7 Apr		8 Apr		9 Apr		10 Apr		11 Apr		12 Apr	
Event ↓	M	E	M	E	M	E	M	E	M	E	M	E
4 × 100 m medley relay		TF										

Women
Date →	7 Apr		8 Apr		9 Apr		10 Apr		11 Apr		12 Apr	
Event ↓	M	E	M	E	M	E	M	E	M	E	M	E
50 m freestyle							H	F				
100 m freestyle	H	F										
200 m freestyle					H	F						
400 m freestyle									H	F		
800 m freestyle	TF	TF										
1500 m freestyle					TF	TF						
50 m backstroke					H	F						
100 m backstroke											H	F
200 m backstroke							H	F				
50 m breaststroke									H	F		
100 m breaststroke	H	F										
200 m breaststroke							H	F				
50 m butterfly											H	F
100 m butterfly			H	F								
200 m butterfly									H	F		
200 m individual medley											H	F
400 m individual medley			H	F								
4 × 100 m freestyle relay				TF								
4 × 200 m freestyle relay								TF				
4 × 100 m medley relay												TF

Women's multiclass
Date →	7 Apr		8 Apr		9 Apr		10 Apr		11 Apr		12 Apr	
Event ↓	M	E	M	E	M	E	M	E	M	E	M	E
50 m freestyle									H	F		
100 m freestyle											H	F
200 m freestyle							H	F				
400 m freestyle	H	F										
50 m backstroke					H	F						
100 m backstroke			H	F								
50 m breaststroke	H	F										
100 m breaststroke							H	F				
50 m butterfly			H	F								
100 m butterfly									H	F		
200 m individual medley					H	F						

Mixed multiclass
Date →	7 Apr		8 Apr		9 Apr		10 Apr		11 Apr		12 Apr	
Event ↓	M	E	M	E	M	E	M	E	M	E	M	E
150 m individual medley										TF		

== Medal winners ==
The results are below.

=== Men's events ===
Event	Gold		Silver		Bronze	
50 m freestyle	Kyle Chalmers; Marion (SA)	22.07	William Stockwell; Rackley (Qld)	22.29	Grayson Bell; TSS Aquatic (Qld)	22.42
100 m freestyle	Kyle Chalmers; Marion (SA)	47.48	Cameron McEvoy; TSS Aquatic (Qld)	49.07	Clyde Lewis; St Peters Western (Qld)	49.29
200 m freestyle	Kyle Chalmers; Marion (SA)	1:46.30	Elijah Winnington; Bond (Qld)	1:46.91	Clyde Lewis; St Peters Western (Qld)	1:47.92
400 m freestyle	Elijah Winnington; Bond (Qld)	3:44.68	Jack McLoughlin; Chandler (Qld)	3:48.96	Joshua Parrish; TSS Aquatic (Qld)	3:49.06
800 m freestyle	Jack McLoughlin; Chandler (Qld)	7:58.66	Joshua Parrish; TSS Aquatic (Qld)	7:59.83	Ben Roberts; Breakers (WA)	8:01.22
1500 m freestyle	Joshua Parrish; TSS Aquatic (Qld)	15:15.53	Ben Roberts; Breakers (WA)	15:15.66	Mitchell Tinsley; Chandler (Qld)	15:26.18
50 m backstroke	William Yang; Ravenswood (NSW)	24.98	Mitch Larkin; St Peters Western (Qld)	25.06	William Stockwell; Rackley (Qld)	25.51
100 m backstroke	Mitch Larkin; St Peters Western (Qld)	53.51	William Yang; Ravenswood (NSW)	53.59	Tristan Hollard; Southport Olympic (Qld)	54.02
200 m backstroke	Mitch Larkin; St Peters Western (Qld)	1:56.22	Tristan Hollard; Southport Olympic (Qld)	1:57.17	Cameron Tysoe; Ginninderra (ACT)	1:59.10
50 m breaststroke	Louis Townsend; Rackley (Qld)	27.72	Jake Packard; USC Spartans (Qld)	27.82	Samuel Williamson; Firbank Aquastars (Vic)	27.89
100 m breaststroke	Matthew Wilson; SOPAC (NSW)	59.67	Zac Stubblety-Cook; West Brisbane (Qld)	1:00.20	Daniel Cave; Melbourne Vicentre (Vic)	1:00.22
200 m breaststroke	Matthew Wilson; SOPAC (NSW)	2:07.16; CR, OR, ACR, MR	Zac Stubblety-Cook; West Brisbane (Qld)	2:08.38	Samuel Williamson; Firbank Aquastars (Vic)	2:13.09
50 m butterfly	William Yang; Ravenswood (NSW)	23.23; MR	Cameron Jones; St Peters Western (Qld)	23.63	Shaun Champion; Abbotsleigh (NSW)	24.01
100 m butterfly	Kyle Chalmers; Marion (SA)	52.07	Matthew Temple; Nunawading (Vic)	52.16	Bowen Gough; Nunawading (Vic)	52.78
200 m butterfly	Nicholas Brown; UWA-West Coast (WA)	1:56.50	Bowen Gough; Nunawading (Vic)	1:56.73	David Morgan; TSS Aquatic (Qld)	1:57.21
200 m IM	Mitch Larkin; St Peters Western (Qld)	1:56.83; MR	Matthew Wilson; SOPAC (NSW)	1:59.41	Jared Gilliland; Brisbane Grammar (Qld)	2:00.07
400 m IM	Mitch Larkin; St Peters Western (Qld)	4:14.62	Brendon Smith; Nunawading (Vic)	4:14.91	Kieren Pollard; Breakers (WA)	4:21.31
4 × 100 m freestyle relay	St Peters Western A (Qld); Jacob Hansford (50.71); Max Carleton (50.45); Mitch Larkin (49.33); Clyde Lewis (48.80)	3:19.29	TSS Aquatic A (Qld); Cameron McEvoy (49.47); David Morgan (50.84); Grayson Bell (50.87); Joshua Parrish (51.46)	3:22.64	Ravenswood A (NSW); Jack Edie (51.33); Andrew Newling (50.77); Myles Bailey (49.80); Lewis Blackburn (51.17)	3:23.07
4 × 200 m freestyle relay	St Peters Western A (Qld); Jacob Hansford (1:51.81); Clyde Lewis (1:50.33); Max Carleton (1:49.76); Mitch Larkin (1:51.14)	7:23.04	TSS Aquatic A (Qld); Cameron McEvoy (1:50.08); David Morgan (1:54.69); Max Osborn (1:55.23); Joshua Parrish (1:51.18)	7:31.18	None awarded	
4 × 100 m medley relay	St Peters Western A (Qld); Mitch Larkin (53.73); Michael Ng (1:04.16); Clyde Lewis (53.28); Jacob Hansford (50.20)	3:41.37	Marion A (SA); Travis Mahoney (56.57); Joshua Palmer (1:02.60); Kyle Chalmers (52.44); Paul Elson (50.81)	3:42.42	TSS Aquatic A (Qld); Connor O'Neill (58.89); Cooper van der Laan (1:02.85); David Morgan (53.10); Grayson Bell (50.59)	3:45.43

=== Men's multiclass events ===
Event	Gold		Silver		Bronze	
50 m freestyle	Rowan Crothers (S10); Yeronga Park (Qld)	23.54 (952)	Timothy Disken (S9); St Hilda's (Qld)	25.73 (917)	Ricky Betar (S14); Auburn (NSW)	24.37 (876) WR
100 m freestyle	Rowan Crothers (S10); Yeronga Park (Qld)	51.87 (943)	Liam Schluter (S14); Kawana Waters (Qld)	53.53 (856)	Ricky Betar (S14); Auburn (NSW)	53.55 (855)
200 m freestyle	Liam Schluter (S14); Kawana Waters (Qld)	1:54.79 (1024) WR	Ricky Betar (S14); Auburn (NSW)	1:58.41 (933)	Jack Ireland (S14); University of Queensland (Qld)	1:58.62 (928)
400 m freestyle	Brenden Hall (S9); Lawnton (Qld)	4:16.89 (921)	Liam Schluter (S14); Kawana Waters (Qld)	4:06.53 (908) WR	Matt Levy (S7); North Sydney (NSW)	4:49.78 (894)
50 m backstroke	Timothy Hodge (S9); Auburn (NSW)	29.70 (866) WR	Rod Welsh (S10); Yarra Plenty (Vic)	28.83 (774)	Harrison Vig (S9); Brisbane Jets (Qld)	30.97 (764)
100 m backstroke	Timothy Hodge (S9); Auburn (NSW)	1:02.73 (954)	Ricky Betar (S14); Auburn (NSW)	1:02.03 (872)	Logan Powell (S9); USC Spartans (Qld)	1:06.01 (819)
50 m breaststroke	Jake Michel (SB14); Carina Leagues CJ's (Qld)	30.04 (879)	Blake Cochrane (SB7); USC Spartans (Qld)	36.58 (653)	Ahmed Kelly (SB3); Melbourne Vicentre (Vic)	55.36 (633)
100 m breaststroke	Jake Michel (SB14); Carina Leagues CJ's (Qld)	1:06.68 (984)	Grant Patterson (SB2); Cairns Central (Qld)	2:12.71 (795)	Timothy Disken (SB8); St Hilda's (Qld)	1:12.40 (793)
50 m butterfly	Liam Schluter (S14); Kawana Waters (Qld)	27.05 (844)	Joshua Alford (S14); Tuggeranong Vikings (ACT)	27.61 (793)	Mitchell Kilduff (S14); SLC Aquadot (NSW)	27.69 (787)
100 m butterfly	Braedan Jason (S12); USC Spartans (Qld); Timothy Hodge (S9); Auburn (NSW)	59.83 (857); 1:02.01 (857)	None awarded		Liam Schluter (S14); Kawana Waters (Qld)	59.01 (842)
200 m IM	Timothy Hodge (SM9); Auburn (NSW)	2:16.92 (929)	Liam Schluter (SM14); Kawana Waters (Qld)	2:12.75 (917)	Ricky Betar (SM14); Auburn (NSW)	2:15.02 (872)

=== Women's events ===
Event	Gold		Silver		Bronze	
50 m freestyle	Cate Campbell; Knox Pymble (NSW)	24.30	Shayna Jack; St Peters Western (Qld)	24.38	Bronte Campbell; Knox Pymble (NSW)	24.51
100 m freestyle	Cate Campbell; Knox Pymble (NSW)	52.35; MR	Emma McKeon; Griffith University (Qld)	52.84	Shayna Jack; St Peters Western (Qld)	53.20
200 m freestyle	Ariarne Titmus; St Peters Western (Qld)	1:54.30; CR, OR, ACR, MR	Emma McKeon; Griffith University (Qld)	1:56.00	Madison Wilson; Marion (SA)	1:56.90
400 m freestyle	Ariarne Titmus; St Peters Western (Qld)	3:59.66 =CR, =OR, MR	Mikayla Messer; Nudgee College (Qld)	4:11.91	Carla Buchanan; Acacia Bayside (Qld)	4:13.18
800 m freestyle	Ariarne Titmus; St Peters Western (Qld)	8:18.61	Kiah Melverton; TSS Aquatic (Qld)	8:27.72	Madeleine Gough; TSS Aquatic (Qld)	8:28.43
1500 m freestyle	Kiah Melverton; TSS Aquatic (Qld)	15:58.09; MR	Madeleine Gough; TSS Aquatic (Qld)	15:58.26	Sophie Caldwell; Nunawading (Vic)	16:27.61
50 m backstroke	Kaylee McKeown; USC Spartans (Qld)	27.65	Minna Atherton; Brisbane Grammar (Qld)	28.03	Holly Barratt; Rockingham (WA)	28.22
100 m backstroke	Minna Atherton; Brisbane Grammar (Qld)	59.71	Kaylee McKeown; USC Spartans (Qld)	59.88	Madison Wilson; Marion (SA)	1:00.53
200 m backstroke	Minna Atherton; Brisbane Grammar (Qld)	2:11.18	Calypso Sheridan; Brisbane Grammar (Qld)	2:11.23	Mikkayla Sheridan; USC Spartans (Qld)	2:12.60
50 m breaststroke	Jessica Hansen; Nunawading (Vic)	30.82	Chelsea Hodges; Southport Olympic (Qld)	31.12	Jenna Strauch; Bond (Qld)	32.04
100 m breaststroke	Abbey Harkin; St Peters Western (Qld)	1:07.02	Jessica Hansen; Nunawading (Vic)	1:07.45	Jenna Strauch; Bond (Qld)	1:07.79
200 m breaststroke	Jenna Strauch; Bond (Qld)	2:24.88	Abbey Harkin; St Peters Western (Qld)	2:25.12	Zoe Deacon; Nunawading (Vic)	2:27.66
50 m butterfly	Holly Barratt; Rockingham (WA)	25.91	Cate Campbell; Knox Pymble (NSW)	26.03	Natasha Ramsden; Abbotsleigh (NSW)	27.03
100 m butterfly	Emma McKeon; Griffith University (Qld)	56.85	Brianna Throssell; UWA-West Coast (WA)	57.52	Alice Stuart; TSS Aquatic (Qld)	59.97
200 m butterfly	Laura Taylor; TSS Aquatic (Qld)	2:08.94	Brittany Castelluzzo; Tea Tree Gully (SA)	2:09.55	Alice Stuart; TSS Aquatic (Qld)	2:10.48
200 m IM	Calypso Sheridan; Brisbane Grammar (Qld)	2:11.53	Abbey Harkin; St Peters Western (Qld)	2:12.26	Blair Evans; UWA-West Coast (WA)	2:14.29
400 m IM	Kaylee McKeown; USC Spartans (Qld)	4:40.25	Calypso Sheridan; Brisbane Grammar (Qld)	4:41.40	Blair Evans; UWA-West Coast (WA)	4:41.97
4 × 100 m freestyle relay	St Peters Western A (Qld); Ariarne Titmus (54.28); Meg Harris (54.47); Abbey Harkin (54.85); Shayna Jack (52.67)	3:36.27; Club, MR	Knox Pymble A (NSW); Claudia Neale (57.61); Eloise Riley (58.84); Bronte Campbell (53.73); Cate Campbell (52.48)	3:42.66	Marion A (SA); Brittany Elmslie (56.09); Ellysia Oldsen (56.86); Emily Liu (57.09); Madison Wilson (53.73)	3:43.77
4 × 200 m freestyle relay	St Peters Western A (Qld); Shayna Jack (1:56.77); Michaela Ryan (2:00.51); Abbey Harkin (2:02.95); Ariarne Titmus (1:56.80)	7:57.03; Club, MR	TSS Aquatic A (Qld); Madeleine Gough (2:01.63); Laura Taylor (2:02.47); Charlotte Mitchell (2:04.00); Kiah Melverton (1:59.51)	8:07.61	St Peters Western B (Qld); Meg Harris (2:05.89); Sienna McDonald (2:08.38); Nicola Hoskin (2:08.72); Elly O'Donoghue (2:08.01)	8:31.00
4 × 100 m medley relay	St Peters Western A (Qld); Shayna Jack (1:03.16); Abbey Harkin (1:07.83); Michaela Ryan (59.92); Ariarne Titmus (53.96)	4:04.87	Nunawading A (Vic); Sophie Caldwell (1:04.90); Jessica Hansen (1:07.09); Kayla Costa (1:00.38); Julia Hawkins (55.18)	4:07.55	Brisbane Grammar A (Qld); Minna Atherton (1:00.26); Calypso Sheridan (1:11.03); Gemma Cooney (1:00.80); Gabrielle Scudamore (57.10)	4:09.19

=== Women's multiclass events ===
Event	Gold		Silver		Bronze	
50 m freestyle	Rachael Watson (S4); Chandler (Qld)	39.12 (907)	Jasmine Greenwood (S10); Bay & Basin (NSW)	28.91 (849)	Katja Dedekind (S13); USC Spartans (Qld); Katherine Downie (S10); Perth City (WA)	28.43 (826); 29.17 (826)
100 m freestyle	Ellie Cole (S9); Knox Pymble (NSW)	1:03.69 (875)	Jasmine Greenwood (S10); Bay & Basin (NSW)	1:02.33 (855)	Ashleigh McConnell (S9); Melbourne Vicentre (Vic)	1:04.64 (837)
200 m freestyle	Lakeisha Patterson (S9); Lawnton (Qld)	2:15.54 (754)	Jade Lucy (S14); SLC Aquadot (NSW)	2:15.64 (729)	Madeleine McTernan (S14); St Hilda's (Qld)	2:18.74 (681)
400 m freestyle	Monique Murphy (S10); Lawnton (Qld)	4:35.45 (934)	Lakeisha Patterson (S9); Lawnton (Qld)	4:35.56 (877)	Ellie Cole (S9); Knox Pymble (NSW)	4:46.78 (778)
50 m backstroke	Taylor Corry (S14); Nelson Bay (NSW)	32.43 (699)	Madeleine McTernan (S14); St Hilda's (Qld)	32.79 (676)	Nicole Fielden (S14); University of Queensland (Qld)	34.25 (593)
100 m backstroke	Ellie Cole (S9); Knox Pymble (NSW)	1:10.20 (895)	Katja Dedekind (S13); USC Spartans (Qld)	1:10.16 (823)	Jasmine Greenwood (S10); Bay & Basin (NSW)	1:10.36 (820)
50 m breaststroke	Tiffany Thomas Kane (SB7); Monte (NSW)	42.39 (764)	Keira Stephens (SB9); Fraser Coast (Qld)	36.97 (642)	Ashley van Rijswijk (SB14); Wagga Wagga (NSW)	36.56 (634)
100 m breaststroke	Tiffany Thomas Kane (SB7); Monte (NSW)	1:33.32 (842)	Ashley van Rijswijk (SB14); Wagga Wagga (NSW)	1:20.95 (722)	Keira Stephens (SB9); Fraser Coast (Qld)	1:20.93 (717)
50 m butterfly	Taylor Corry (S14); Nelson Bay (NSW)	30.31 (895)	Ruby Storm (S14); Traralgon (Vic)	30.47 (881)	Madeleine Scott (S9); Nunawading (Vic)	31.46 (817)
100 m butterfly	Madeleine Scott (S9); Nunawading (Vic)	1:10.02 (866)	Emily Beecroft (S9); Traralgon (Vic)	1:10.69 (842)	Taylor Corry (S14); Nelson Bay (NSW)	1:08.29 (828)
200 m IM	Jasmine Greenwood (SM10); Bay & Basin (NSW)	2:31.93 (868)	Katherine Downie (SM10); Perth City (WA)	2:34.54 (824)	Lakeisha Patterson (SM9); Lawnton (Qld)	2:41.24 (771)

=== Mixed events ===
Event	Gold		Silver		Bronze	
4 × 100 m medley relay	St Peters Western A (Qld); Mitch Larkin (54.10); Abbey Harkin (1:07.66); Clyde Lewis (52.99); Shayna Jack (53.30)	3:48.05	TSS Aquatic A (Qld); Cameron McEvoy (56.60); Cooper van der Laan (1:02.66); Alice Stuart (59.95); Kiah Melverton (55.99)	3:55.20	UWA-West Coast A (WA); Zac Incerti (57.11); Alex Milligan (1:01.44); Brianna Throssell (59.88); Jemima Horwood (56.97)	3:55.40

=== Mixed multiclass events ===
Event	Gold		Silver		Bronze
150 m IM	Ahmed Kelly (SM3); Melbourne Vicentre (Vic)	2:56.26 (751)	Grant Patterson (SM3); Central Cairns (Qld)	3:06.13 (637)	None awarded

Legend: WR – World record; CR – Commonwealth record; OR – Oceanian record; AR – Australian record; ACR – Australian All Comers record; Club – Australian Club record; MR – Meet record

== Records broken ==
During the 2019 Australian Swimming Championships the following records were set.

=== World records ===
- Men's 50 m freestyle S14 – Ricky Betar, Auburn (24.37) (final) (S14)
- Men's 200 m freestyle S14 – Liam Schluter, Kawana Waters (1:54.79) (final)
- Men's 400 m freestyle S14 – Liam Schluter, Kawana Waters (4:06.53) (final)
- Men's 50 m backstroke S9 – Timothy Hodge, Auburn (29.70) (final)

=== Commonwealth, Oceanian and Australian records ===
- Men's 200 m breaststroke – Matthew Wilson, SOPAC (2:07.16) (final)
- Women's 200 m freestyle – Ariarne Titmus, St Peters Western (1:54.30) (final)
- Women's 400 m freestyle – Ariarne Titmus, St Peters Western (3:59.66) (final) (equal)

=== Australian club records ===
- Women's 4 × 100 m freestyle relay – Ariarne Titmus, Meg Harris, Abbey Harkin, Shayna Jack, St Peters Western (3:36.27) (final)
- Women's 4 × 200 m freestyle relay – Shayna Jack, Michaela Ryan, Abbey Harkin, Ariarne Titmus, St Peters Western (7:57.03) (final)

=== All Comers records ===
- Men's 200 m breaststroke – Matthew Wilson, SOPAC (2:07.16) (final)
- Women's 200 m freestyle – Ariarne Titmus, St Peters Western (1:54.30) (final)

=== Championship records ===
- Men's 200 m breaststroke – Matthew Wilson, SOPAC (2:07.16) (final)
- Men's 50 m butterfly – William Yang, Ravenswood (23.23) (final)
- Men's 200 m individual medley – Mitch Larkin, St Peters Western (1:56.83) (final)
- Women's 100 m freestyle – Cate Campbell, Knox Pymble (52.35) (final)
- Women's 200 m freestyle – Ariarne Titmus, St Peters Western (1:54.30) (final)
- Women's 400 m freestyle – Ariarne Titmus, St Peters Western (3:59.66) (final)
- Women's 1500 m freestyle – Kiah Melverton, TSS Aquatic (15:58.09) (final)
- Women's 4 × 100 m freestyle relay – Ariarne Titmus, Meg Harris, Abbey Harkin, Shayna Jack, St Peters Western (3:36.27) (final)
- Women's 4 × 200 m freestyle relay – Shayna Jack, Michaela Ryan, Abbey Harkin, Ariarne Titmus, St Peters Western (7:57.03) (final)

== World Para Swimming Championships team ==
On 12 April 2019, the team for the 2019 World Para Swimming Championships was announced. 34 members were named with the nine making their international debut.

2019 World Para Swimming Championships Team
Name	State	Age (Note: As at the time of the announcement)	Championships
Jesse Aungles	SA	23	2nd
Ricky Betar	NSW	15	1st
Blake Cochrane	Qld	28	5th
Ellie Cole	NSW	27	6th
Taylor Corry	NSW	24	3rd
Rowan Crothers	Qld	21	3rd
Katja Dedekind	Qld	17	2nd
Timothy Disken	Qld	22	3rd
Jamie-Lee Getson	Vic	20	1st
Jasmine Greenwood	NSW	14	2nd
Brenden Hall	Qld	25	5th
Timothy Hodge	NSW	18	3rd
Jack Ireland	Qld	19	1st
Braedan Jason	Qld	20	3rd
Ella Jones	NSW	18	1st
Jenna Jones	NSW	18	1st
Ahmed Kelly	Vic	27	2nd
Matt Levy	NSW	32	6th
Jade Lucy	NSW	22	1st
William Martin	Qld	18	1st
Jeremy McClure	WA	31	1st
Madeleine McTernan	Qld	18	1st
Jake Michel	Qld	21	1st
Monique Murphy	Qld	25	3rd
Grant Patterson	Qld	29	4th
Lakeisha Patterson	Qld	20	3rd
Col Pearse	Vic	15	1st
Rick Pendleton	Qld	34	4th
Ben Popham	WA	18	1st
Liam Schluter	Qld	20	1st
Keira Stephens	Qld	16	1st
Ruby Storm	Vic	15	1st
Tiffany Thomas Kane	NSW	17	3rd
Rachael Watson	Qld	27	2nd

== Club points scores ==
The final club point scores are below. Note: Only the top ten clubs are listed.

Overall club point score
Rank	Club	State	Points
1	St Peters Western	Qld	1,596
2	Nunawading	Vic	1,503
3	TSS Aquatic	Qld	1,117
4	Brisbane Grammar	Qld	856
5	USC Spartans	Qld	719
6	UWA-West Coast	WA	678.5
7	Knox Pymble	NSW	621
8	Marion	SA	602.5
9	Rackley	Qld	594
10	Bond	Qld	589

== Broadcast ==
The morning sessions were streamed live on the website of Swimming Australia. The evening sessions were broadcast live on 7TWO. This was the fourth national championships to be screen by Seven after securing the broadcast rights with Swimming Australia in September 2015. The commentary team consisted of Basil Zempilas, Ian Thorpe, Giaan Rooney with poolside interviews conducted by Nathan Templeton.
