= Swimming at the 2020 Summer Paralympics – Men's 100 metre backstroke S14 =

Men's 100 metre backstroke S14 at the XVI Paralympic Games
- Venue: Tokyo Aquatics Centre
- Dates: 2 September 2021
- Competitors: 18 from 12 nations

Medalists
1st place, gold medalist(s)		Benjamin Hance	Australia
2nd place, silver medalist(s)		Viacheslav Emeliantsev	RPC
3rd place, bronze medalist(s)		Reece Dunn	Great Britain

The Men's 100 metre backstroke S14 event at the 2020 Paralympic Games took place on 2 September 2021, at the Tokyo Aquatics Centre.

== Heats ==
The swimmers with the top eight times, regardless of heat, advanced to the final.

Rank	Heat	Lane	Name	Nationality	Time	Notes
1	3	4	Benjamin Hance	Australia	57.75	Q, PR, OC
2	3	5	Reece Dunn	Great Britain	1:00.37	Q
3	3	6	Inkook Lee	South Korea	1:00.62	Q
4	1	3	Vasyl Krainyk	Ukraine	1:01.15	Q
5	3	3	Louis Lawlor	Great Britain	1:01.43	Q
6	2	6	Mikhail Kuliabin	RPC	1:01.48	Q
7	2	5	Jordan Catchpole	Great Britain	1:01.50	Q
8	1	4	Viacheslav Emeliantsev	RPC	1:01.52	Q
9	2	4	Gabriel Bandeira	Brazil	1:01.63	
10	1	5	Ricky Betar	Australia	1:01.84	
11	1	6	Hui Ka Chun	Hong Kong	1:02.74	
12	3	2	Parker Egbert	United States	1:03.12	
13	2	3	Marc Evers	Netherlands	1:03.98	
14	2	2	Lawrence Sapp	United States	1:04.53	
15	1	2	Lautaro Daniel Maidana Cancinos	Argentina	1:05.50	
16	3	7	Cho Won-sang	South Korea	1:05.71	
17	1	7	Nader Khalili	Finland	1:07.04	
18	2	7	Nathan Maillet	France	1:08.05	

== Final ==
Rank	Lane	Name	Nationality	Time	Notes
1st place, gold medalist(s)	4	Benjamin Hance	Australia	57.73	PR, OC
2nd place, silver medalist(s)	8	Viacheslav Emeliantsev	RPC	59.05	ER
3rd place, bronze medalist(s)	5	Reece Dunn	Great Britain	59.97	
4	1	Jordan Catchpole	Great Britain	1.00.96	
5	3	Inkook Lee	South Korea	1.00.98	
6	7	Mikhail Kuliabin	RPC	1.01.15	
7	6	Vasyl Krainyk	Ukraine	1.01.16	
8	2	Louis Lawlor	Great Britain	1.01.80	
