= Swimming at the 2018 Commonwealth Games – Men's 200 metre freestyle S14 =

Men's 200 metre freestyle S14 at the 2018 Commonwealth Games
- Venue: Gold Coast Aquatic Centre
- Dates: 5 April
- Competitors: 8 from 5 nations
- Winning time: 1:55.88

Medalists
gold medal	Thomas Hamer	England
silver medal	Liam Schluter	Australia
bronze medal	Daniel Fox	Australia

The men's 200 metre freestyle S14 event at the 2018 Commonwealth Games will be held on 5 April at the Gold Coast Aquatic Centre.

== Records ==
Prior to this competition, the existing world, Commonwealth and Games records were as follows:

World record	Thomas Hamer (ENG)	1:56.18	Sheffield, United Kingdom	25 July 2017
Commonwealth record	Thomas Hamer (ENG)	1:56.18	Sheffield, United Kingdom	25 July 2017
Games record				

== Schedule ==
The schedule is as follows:

All times are Australian Eastern Standard Time (UTC+10)

Date	Time	Round
Thursday 5 April 2018	11:13	Qualifying
Thursday 5 April 2018	20:21	Final

== Results ==
=== Heats ===
Rank	Heat	Lane	Name	Nationality	Time	Notes
1	1	6	Daniel Fox	Australia	2:00.40	Q
2	1	5	Liam Schluter	Australia	2:00.44	Q
3	1	3	Mitchell Kilduff	Australia	2:01.02	Q
4	1	4	Thomas Hamer	England	2:01.08	Q
5	1	2	Jack Thomas	Wales	2:03.17	Q
6	1	7	Alex Rosser	Wales	2:07.34	Q
7	1	1	Jin Ping Ting	Malaysia	2:22.52	Q
8	1	8	Han Liang Chou	Singapore	7 2:25.09	Q

=== Final ===
Rank	Lane	Name	Nationality	Time	Notes
1st place, gold medalist(s)	6	Thomas Hamer	England	1:55.88	WR
2nd place, silver medalist(s)	5	Liam Schluter	Australia	1:56.23	
3rd place, bronze medalist(s)	4	Daniel Fox	Australia	1:58.26	
4	3	Mitchell Kilduff	Australia	1:59.55	
5	2	Jack Thomas	Wales	2:05.38	
6	7	Alex Rosser	Wales	2:05.60	
7	1	Jin Ping Ting	Malaysia	2:20.93	
8	8	Han Liang Chou	Singapore	2:25.22	
