= Swimming at the 2020 Summer Paralympics – Men's 100 metre butterfly S14 =

Men's 100 metre butterfly S14 at the XVI Paralympic Games
- Venue: Tokyo Aquatics Centre
- Dates: 25 August 2021
- Competitors: 19 from 13 nations

Medalists
1st place, gold medalist(s)		Gabriel Bandeira	Brazil
2nd place, silver medalist(s)		Reece Dunn	Great Britain
3rd place, bronze medalist(s)		Benjamin Hance	Australia

The Men's 100 metre butterfly S14 event at the 2020 Paralympic Games took place on 25 August 2021, at the Tokyo Aquatics Centre.

== Heats ==
The swimmers with the top 8 times, regardless of heat, advanced to the final.

Rank	Heat	Lane	Name	Nationality	Time	Notes
1	3	4	Reece Dunn	Great Britain	55.99	Q, PR
2	2	4	Gabriel Bandeira	Brazil	56.78	Q
3	3	5	Lawrence Sapp	United States	56.97	Q
4	2	5	Benjamin Hance	Australia	57.07	Q
5	3	3	Naohide Yamaguchi	Japan	57.57	Q
6	3	7	Ricky Betar	Australia	58.25	Q
7	3	2	Robert Isak Jónsson	Iceland	58.34	Q
8	2	3	Cho Won-sang	South Korea	58.37	Q
9	1	6	Liam Schluter	Australia	58.38	
9	3	1	Nicholas Bennett	Canada	58.38	
11	1	4	Dai Tokairin	Japan	58.44	
12	1	3	Mikhail Kuliabin	RPC	58.47	
13	2	7	Vasyl Krainyk	Ukraine	58.74	
14	2	2	Marc Evers	Netherlands	58.91	
15	1	5	Keichi Nakajima	Japan	58.96	
16	1	7	Jordan Catchpole	Great Britain	59.16	
17	2	6	Lautaro Maidana Cancinos	Argentina	59.67	
18	1	2	Tang Wai Lok	Hong Kong	1:02.53	
	3	6	Lee In-kook	South Korea	DSQ	

== Final ==
100m butterfly final
Rank	Lane	Name	Nationality	Time	Notes
1st place, gold medalist(s)	5	Gabriel Bandeira	Brazil	54.76	PR
2nd place, silver medalist(s)	4	Reece Dunn	Great Britain	55.12	
3rd place, bronze medalist(s)	6	Benjamin Hance	Australia	56.90	
4	2	Naohide Yamaguchi	Japan	57.11	
5	3	Lawrence Sapp	United States	57.36	
6	1	Robert Isak Jónsson	Iceland	58.06	
7	8	Cho Won-sang	South Korea	58.45	
8	7	Ricky Betar	Australia	58.62	
