= 2019 Australian World Swimming Trials =

- Host city: Brisbane, Queensland
- Date: 9–14 June
- Venue: Brisbane Aquatic Centre

The 2019 Australian World Swimming Trials are current being held from 9 to 14 June 2019 at the Brisbane Aquatic Centre in Brisbane, Queensland. The event is the selection trials for the 2019 World Aquatics Championships in Gwangju, South Korea.

Following Australia's performance at the 2016 Rio Olympics where 29 medals were won and finishing 10th on the medal tally, Swimming Australia announced in the February 2017 that the timing of the selection trials would be modified. Historically, the trials were held in April several months before the Olympics were held. This will be now changed to follow the American model where the trials are held six weeks before.

A Para Grand Prix will be held in conjunction with the trials on the 13 to 14 June 2019.

The legends relay was a mixed 4 × 50 m freestyle event swam on the fourth night of the meet. The team were:

- Team Frame - Trevor Green, Marcelo Figueredo, Aaron Boersma and Linley Frame
- Team Fraser - David Barrett, Brendan Dyer, Therese Crollick, Sandra Wylie
- Team Rickard - Jane Sadler, Michael Lee, Jennifer Campbell, Brenton Rickard
- Team Gallen - Jason Burgess, Jodie Greensill, Gillian O'Mara, Michelle Gallen
- Team Flouch - Jamie Coates, Casey Flouch, Todd Robinson, Kylie Fletcher
- Team Schipper - Martin Banks, Janette Jeffrey, Gerry Tucker, Jessicah Schipper
- Team FFrost - Nick Ffrost, Maree Antonio and Russell Booysen

The event was won by Team Flouch in a time of 1:57.99, followed by Team Gallen (2:02.86) and Team FFrost where Nick Ffrost swam the backstroke and freestyle legs (2:17.02).

== Schedule ==
Legend
Key	H	½	F	TF
Value	Heats	Semifinals	Final	Timed final

M = Morning session, E = Evening session

Men
Date →	9 Jun		10 Jun		11 Jun		12 Jun		13 Jun		14 Jun	
Event ↓	M	E	M	E	M	E	M	E	M	E	M	E
50 m freestyle											H	F
100 m freestyle							H	F				
200 m freestyle			H	F								
400 m freestyle	H	F										
800 m freestyle					TF	TF						
1500 m freestyle									TF	TF		
100 m backstroke			H	F								
200 m backstroke									H	F		
100 m breaststroke	H	F										
200 m breaststroke									H	F		
100 m butterfly											H	F
200 m butterfly					H	F						
200 m individual medley							H	F				
400 m individual medley											H	F

Men's multiclass
Date →	9 Jun		10 Jun		11 Jun		12 Jun		13 Jun		14 Jun	
Event ↓	M	E	M	E	M	E	M	E	M	E	M	E
50 m freestyle									H	F		
100 m freestyle									H	F		
200 m freestyle									H	F		
400 m freestyle									H	F		
50 m backstroke									H	F		
100 m backstroke									H	F		
50 m breaststroke									H	F		
100 m breaststroke									H	F		
50 m butterfly									H	F		
100 m butterfly									H	F		
150 m individual medley									H	F		
200 m individual medley									H	F		

Women
Date →	9 Jun		10 Jun		11 Jun		12 Jun		13 Jun		14 Jun	
Event ↓	M	E	M	E	M	E	M	E	M	E	M	E
50 m freestyle											H	F
100 m freestyle									H	F		
200 m freestyle					H	F						
400 m freestyle	H	F										
800 m freestyle							TF	TF				
1500 m freestyle			TF	TF								
100 m backstroke			H	F								
200 m backstroke											H	F
100 m breaststroke			H	F								
200 m breaststroke									H	F		
100 m butterfly	H	F										
200 m butterfly							H	F				
200 m individual medley	H	F										
400 m individual medley							H	F				

Women's multiclass
Date →	9 Jun		10 Jun		11 Jun		12 Jun		13 Jun		14 Jun	
Event ↓	M	E	M	E	M	E	M	E	M	E	M	E
50 m freestyle									H	F		
100 m freestyle									H	F		
200 m freestyle									H	F		
400 m freestyle									H	F		
50 m backstroke									H	F		
100 m backstroke									H	F		
50 m breaststroke									H	F		
100 m breaststroke									H	F		
50 m butterfly									H	F		
100 m butterfly									H	F		
150 m individual medley									H	F		
200 m individual medley									H	F		

== Medal winners ==
The results are below.

=== Men's events ===
Event	Gold		Silver		Bronze	
50 m freestyle						
100 m freestyle	Kyle Chalmers; Marion (SA)	47.35	Clyde Lewis; St Peters Western (Qld)	48.46	Cameron McEvoy; TSS Aquatic (Qld)	48.66
200 m freestyle	Kyle Chalmers; Marion (SA)	1:45.76	Clyde Lewis; St Peters Western (Qld)	1:45.88	Alexander Graham; Bond (Qld)	1:46.25
400 m freestyle	Jack McLoughlin; Chandler (Qld)	3:44.34	Mack Horton; Melbourne Vicentre (Vic)	3:46.47	Elijah Winnington; Bond (Qld)	3:48.45
800 m freestyle	Jack McLoughlin; Chandler (Qld)	7:46.79	Joshua Parrish; TSS Aquatic (Qld)	7:54.94	Mack Horton; Melbourne Vicentre (Vic)	8:01.30
1500 m freestyle	Jack McLoughlin; Chandler (Qld)	14:52.83	Nicholas Sloman; Noosa (Qld)	15:11.12	Ben Roberts; Breakers (WA)	15:22.72
100 m backstroke	Mitch Larkin; St Peters Western (Qld)	52.38; ACR	William Yang; Ravenswood (NSW)	54.46	Bradley Woodward; Mingara Aquatic (NSW)	54.46
200 m backstroke	Mitch Larkin; St Peters Western (Qld)	1:55.03	Bradley Woodward; Mingara Aquatic (NSW)	1:57.66	Jorden Merrilees; Melbourne Vicentre (Vic)	1:58.11
100 m breaststroke	Matthew Wilson; SOPAC (NSW)	59.78	Daniel Cave; Melbourne Vicentre (Vic)	1:00.18	Zac Stubblety-Cook; West Brisbane (Qld)	1:00.39
200 m breaststroke	Matthew Wilson; SOPAC (NSW)	2:07.79	Zac Stubblety-Cook; West Brisbane (Qld)	2:08.54	Daniel Cave; Melbourne Vicentre (Vic)	2:10.17
100 m butterfly						
200 m butterfly	David Morgan; TSS Aquatic (Qld)	1:55.26	Grant Irvine; UWA-West Coast (WA)	1:55.89	Matthew Temple; Nunawading (Vic)	1:56.58
200 m IM	Mitch Larkin; St Peters Western (Qld)	1:55.72; CR, OR	Thomas Fraser-Holmes; Griffith University (Qld)	1:58.76	Jared Gilliland; Brisbane Grammar (Qld)	1:59.86
400 m IM						

=== Men's multiclass events ===
Event	Gold		Silver		Bronze	
50 m freestyle						
100 m freestyle						
200 m freestyle	Liam Schluter (S14); Kawana Waters (Qld)	1:57.78 (948)	Jack Ireland (S14); University of Queensland (Qld)	2:00.58 (884)	Daniel Fox (S14); TSS Aquatic (Qld)	2:03.10 (830)
400 m freestyle	Matt Levy (S7); North Sydney (NSW)	4:51.37 (879)	Timothy Hodge (S9); Auburn (NSW)	4:23.13 (857)	Ben Popham (S8); Arena (WA)	4:49.50 (722)
50 m backstroke						
100 m backstroke						
50 m breaststroke						
100 m breaststroke						
50 m butterfly						
100 m butterfly						
150 m IM						
200 m IM						

=== Women's events ===
Event	Gold		Silver		Bronze	
50 m freestyle						
100 m freestyle	Cate Campbell; Knox Pymble (NSW)	52.12	Emma McKeon; Griffith University (Qld)	52.41	Bronte Campbell; Knox Pymble (NSW)	52.84
200 m freestyle	Emma McKeon; Griffith University (Qld)	1:54.55	Ariarne Titmus; St Peters Western (Qld)	1:55.09	Shayna Jack; St Peters Western (Qld)	1:56.37
400 m freestyle	Ariarne Titmus; St Peters Western (Qld)	3:59.35; CR, OR	Kiah Melverton; TSS Aquatic (Qld)	4:05.30	Lani Pallister; Cotton Tree (Qld)	4:06.57
800 m freestyle	Ariarne Titmus; St Peters Western (Qld)	8:18.23	Kiah Melverton; TSS Aquatic (Qld)	8:22.83	Lani Pallister; Cotton Tree (Qld)	8:25.66
1500 m freestyle	Madeleine Gough; TSS Aquatic (Qld)	15:56.39	Kiah Melverton; TSS Aquatic (Qld)	15:56.46	Lani Pallister; Cotton Tree (Qld)	16:06.84
100 m backstroke	Minna Atherton; Brisbane Grammar (Qld)	59.20	Kaylee McKeown; USC Spartans (Qld)	59.28	Holly Barratt; Rockingham (WA)	1:00.24
200 m backstroke						
100 m breaststroke	Jessica Hansen; Nunawading (Vic)	1:07.06	Jenna Strauch; Bond (Qld)	1:07.79	Abbey Harkin; St Peters Western (Qld)	1:07.93
200 m breaststroke	Taylor McKeown; Griffith University (Qld)	2:24.95	Tessa Wallace; Pelican Waters (Qld)	2:25.15	Jenna Strauch; Bond (Qld)	2:26.34
100 m butterfly	Emma McKeon; Griffith University (Qld)	57.28	Brianna Throssell; UWA-West Coast (WA)	57.57	Jemma Schlicht; Kawana Waters (Qld)	59.51
200 m butterfly	Brianna Throssell; UWA-West Coast (WA)	2:07.39	Laura Taylor; TSS Aquatic (Qld)	2:08.42	Brittany Castelluzzo; Tea Tree Gully (SA)	2:10.83
200 m IM	Kaylee McKeown; USC Spartans (Qld)	2:09.94	Blair Evans; UWA-West Coast (WA)	2:13.55	Meg Bailey; Hunter (NSW)	2:14.39
400 m IM	Blair Evans; UWA-West Coast (WA)	4:40.40	Meg Bailey; Hunter (NSW)	4:41.61	Jenna Forrester; St Peters Western (Qld)	4:44.39

=== Women's multiclass events ===
Event	Gold		Silver		Bronze	
50 m freestyle						
100 m freestyle						
200 m freestyle	Ruby Storm (S14); Traralgon (Vic)	2:17.50 (700)	Jade Lucy (S14); SLC Aquadot (NSW)	2:20.61 (655)	None awarded	
400 m freestyle	Lakeisha Patterson (S9); Lawnton (Qld)	4:41.96 (819)	Jenna Jones (S13); Auburn (NSW)	4:58.80 (656)	Ella Jones (S8); Springwood (NSW)	5:22.98 (654)
50 m backstroke						
100 m backstroke						
50 m breaststroke						
100 m breaststroke						
50 m butterfly						
100 m butterfly						
150 m IM						
200 m IM						

Legend: WR – World record; CR – Commonwealth record; OR – Oceanian record; AR – Australian record; ACR – Australian All Comers record; Club – Australian Club record

== Records broken ==
During the 2019 Australian World Swimming Trails the following records were set.

=== Commonwealth, Oceanian and Australian records ===
- Men's 200 m individual medley – Mitch Larkin, St Peters Western (1:55.72) (final)
- Women's 400 m freestyle – Ariarne Titmus, St Peters Western (3:59.35) (final)
