= Jack Thomas (swimmer) =

British parasport swimmer (born 1995)

Personal information
- Nationality: British
- Born: 30 May 1995 (age 31) Swansea, Wales

Sport
- Sport: Swimming
- Strokes: freestyle, backstroke
- Club: Swansea University
Medal record
Representing Great Britain
Swimming
IPC European Championships
Silver medal – second place	2014 Eindhoven	100m backstroke S14
Silver medal – second place	2014 Eindhoven	200m medley S14
Bronze medal – third place	2014 Eindhoven	200m freestyle S14
Representing Wales
Commonwealth Games
Bronze medal – third place	2014 Glasgow	200m freestyle S14

Jack Thomas (born 30 May 1995) is a British parasport swimmer. Thomas competes in the S14 classification for swimmers with intellectual disabilities, mainly freestyle and backstroke, preferring shorter distances. In 2014 he competed at the Commonwealth Games in Glasgow representing Wales and took the bronze medal in the 200m freestyle S14.

== Personal history ==
Thomas was born in Swansea, Wales in 1995 to Mark and Wendy Thomas. When Jack was two years old he was diagnosed as having learning difficulties. He was educated at Morriston Comprehensive.

== Career history ==
Thomas first began swimming at the age of four, when his parents took him to the local pool in an attempt to help him burn off excess energy. As he matured, he showed promise as a competitive swimmer and won several junior competitions but the decision made by the IPC, after a controversy at the 2000 Summer Paralympics, meant a competitive ban on all events for athletes with an intellectual disability. This saw him unable to compete at meets for disabled swimmers. His parents petitioned the Equality and Human Rights Commission, the director of which stated in 2008 that the Thomas' letter was a major factor in seeing the Youth Sports Trust lift the ban for children competing in Britain.

In 2013 Thomas was selected to compete at his first major tournament for Great Britain. He came fifth in the 100m backstroke S14 and sixth in the 200m individual medley SM14. The next year he was selected to represent Wales at the 2014 Commonwealth Games in Scotland. There he competed in the 200m freestyle S14, the first event for swimmers with a learning disability. In the finals Thomas took bronze with a time of 2:01.27, behind Australia's Daniel Fox and England's Thomas Hamer. A month later he was back in the Great Britain team, this time travelling to Eindhoven to take part in the 2014 IPC Swimming European Championships. In Eindhoven Thomas was entered into three events the 100m backstroke, 200m freestyle S14 and the 200m individual medley SM14. He won bronze in the 50m backstroke and silver in the medley and freestyle. A wrist injury ruled Thomas out of the 2015 World Championships in Glasgow.

In 2017, Thomas raised money in order to take part in the 2018 Commonwealth Games.
