= 2020 World Para Swimming European Open Championships – Men's 200 metre freestyle =

The men's 200m freestyle events at the 2020 World Para Swimming European Championships were held at the Penteada Olympic Pools Complex.

== Medalists ==
Event	Gold	Silver	Bronze
S2	Alberto Abarza; Chile	Roman Bondarenko; Ukraine	Aristeidis Makrodimitris; Greece
S3	Denys Ostapchenko; Ukraine	Vincenzo Boni; Italy	Serhii Palamarchuk; Ukraine
S4	Ami Omer Dadaon; Israel	Roman Zhdanov; Russia	Luigi Beggiato; Italy
S5	Francesco Bocciardo; Italy	Antoni Ponce Bertran; Spain	Luis Huerta Poza; Spain
S14	Gabriel Bandeira; Brazil	Viacheslav Emeliantsev; Russia	Thomas Hamer; Great Britain

== Results ==
=== S14 ===
Heats

Rank	Heat	Name	Nationality	Time	Notes
1	1	Gabriel Bandeira	Brazil	1:57.91	Q, AM
2	2	Mikhail Kuliabin	Russia	2:00.24	Q
3	1	Viacheslav Emeliantsev	Russia	2:00.29	Q
4	2	Thomas Hamer	Great Britain	2:01.89	Q
5	2	Robert Isak Jonsson	Iceland	2:02.42	Q
6	1	Misha Palazzo	Italy	2:02.45	Q
7	1	Nader Khalili	Finland	2:02.94	Q
8	1	Andrei Shabalin	Russia	2:03.82	Q
9	2	Nathan Maillet	France	2:04.29	
10	2	Joao Pedro Brutos de Oliveira	Brazil	2:06.43	
11	1	Kim Kyeongbin	South Korea	2:06.74	
12	2	Javier Labrador Fernandez	Spain	2:07.94	
13	1	Andre Luiz Bento Da Silva Filho	Brazil	2:09.15	
14	2	Adrian Longaron Carrera	Spain	2:12.84	

Final

Rank	Name	Nationality	Time	Notes
1st place, gold medalist(s)	Gabriel Bandeira	Brazil	1:55.37	AM
2nd place, silver medalist(s)	Viacheslav Emeliantsev	Russia	1:56.45	
3rd place, bronze medalist(s)	Thomas Hamer	Great Britain	1:57.20	
4	Mikhail Kuliabin	Russia	1:58.71	
5	Robert Isak Jonsson	Iceland	2:02.20	
6	Misha Palazzo	Italy	2:02.39	
7	Andrei Shabalin	Russia	2:02.92	
8	Nader Khalili	Finland	2:03.03	
