= Reece Dunn =

British Paralympic swimmer (born 1995)

Reece Dunn MBE
Personal information
- Nickname: Reecey
- Born: 19 September 1995 (age 30)
- Home town: Plymouth, United Kingdom

Sport
- Country: Great Britain
- Sport: Paralympic swimming
- Disability: Autism
- Disability class: S14, SB14, SM14
- Club: Plymouth Leander Swimming Club
- Coached by: Robin Armayan
Medal record
Paralympic swimming
Representing Great Britain
Paralympic Games
Gold medal – first place	2020 Tokyo	200 m freestyle S14
Gold medal – first place	2020 Tokyo	200 m ind. medley SM14
Gold medal – first place	2020 Tokyo	mixed 4 × 100 m freestyle relay SM14
Silver medal – second place	2020 Tokyo	100 m butterfly S14
Bronze medal – third place	2020 Tokyo	100 m backstroke S14
World Championships
Gold medal – first place	2019 London	100 m butterflyS14
Gold medal – first place	2019 London	200 m freestyle S14
Gold medal – first place	2019 London	mixed 4x100m freestyle relay S14
Silver medal – second place	2019 London	200 metre individual medley S14

Reece Dunn (born 19 September 1995) is a British Paralympic swimmer. He represented Great Britain at the 2020 Summer Paralympics.

== Career ==
Dunn was named the World Disabled Swimmer of the Year in 2019.

Dunn, who is diagnosed with autism, represented Great Britain at the 2020 Summer Paralympics where he won a gold medal in the 200 metre freestyle and a silver medal in the 100 metre butterfly S14 events. He also competed in the men's 200 metre individual medley SM14 event where he finished with a world record time of 2:08.02 and won a gold medal. He competed in the 100 metre backstroke S14 event and won a bronze medal.

Dunn was appointed Member of the Order of the British Empire (MBE) in the 2022 New Year Honours for services to swimming.
