= Gabriel Bandeira =

Brazilian Paralympic swimmer

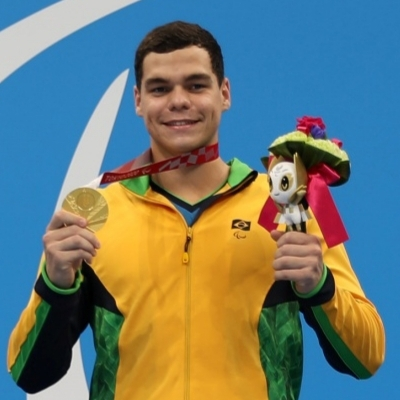

Personal information
- Born: 29 October 1999 (age 26) Indaiatuba, Brazil

Sport
- Country: Brazil
- Sport: Para swimming
- Disability class: S14
Medal record
Men's para swimming
Representing Brazil
Event	1st	2nd	3rd
Paralympic Games	1	3	3
World Championships	4	7	0
European Championships	5	0	0
Parapan American Games	5	0	0
Total	15	10	3
Paralympic Games
Gold medal – first place	2020 Tokyo	100 m butterfly S14
Silver medal – second place	2020 Tokyo	200 m freestyle S14
Silver medal – second place	2020 Tokyo	200 m ind. medley SM14
Silver medal – second place	2024 Paris	100 m backstroke S14
Bronze medal – third place	2020 Tokyo	Mixed 4 × 100 m freestyle relay S14
Bronze medal – third place	2024 Paris	100 m butterfly S14
Bronze medal – third place	2024 Paris	Mixed 4 × 100 m freestyle relay S14
World Championships
Gold medal – first place	2022 Madeira	200 m freestyle S14
Gold medal – first place	2022 Madeira	200 m ind. medley SM14
Gold medal – first place	2023 Manchester	100 m butterfly S14
Gold medal – first place	2025 Singapore	200 m ind. medley SM14
Silver medal – second place	2022 Madeira	100 m backstroke S14
Silver medal – second place	2023 Manchester	100 m backstroke S14
Silver medal – second place	2025 Singapore	200 m freestyle S14
Silver medal – second place	2025 Singapore	100 m backstroke S14
Silver medal – second place	2025 Singapore	100 m butterfly S14
Silver medal – second place	2025 Singapore	Mixed 4×100 m freestyle relay S14
Silver medal – second place	2025 Singapore	Mixed 4×100 m medley relay S14
European Championships
Gold medal – first place	2020 Funchal	100 m freestyle S14
Gold medal – first place	2020 Funchal	100 m breaststroke S14
Gold medal – first place	2020 Funchal	100 m butterfly S14
Gold medal – first place	2020 Funchal	200 m freestyle S14
Gold medal – first place	2020 Funchal	200 m ind. medley S14
Parapan American Games
Gold medal – first place	2023 Santiago	100 m backstroke S14
Gold medal – first place	2023 Santiago	100 m butterfly S14
Gold medal – first place	2023 Santiago	100 m breaststroke SB14
Gold medal – first place	2023 Santiago	200 m freestyle S14
Gold medal – first place	2023 Santiago	200 m ind. medley SM14

Gabriel Bandeira (born 29 October 1999) is a Brazilian Paralympic swimmer. He represented Brazil at the 2020 and 2024 Summer Paralympics.

== Career ==
Bandeira made his international debut for Brazil at the 2020 World Para Swimming European Open Championships. He won six gold medals in six races and improved his own Americas record eight times during the week in Portugal.

Bandeira represented Brazil at the 2020 Summer Paralympics where he won a gold medal in the 100 metre butterfly S14 and a silver medal in the 200 metre freestyle events.

Bandeira represented Brazil at the 2023 Parapan American Games where he won five gold medals.
