= Swimming at the 2014 Commonwealth Games – Men's 200 metre freestyle S14 =

Men's 200 metre freestyle S14 at the 2014 Commonwealth Games
- Venue: Tollcross International Swimming Centre
- Dates: 26 July 2014
- Competitors: 7 from 5 nations
- Winning time: 1:57.89

Medalists
gold medal	Daniel Fox	Australia
silver medal	Thomas Hamer	England
bronze medal	Jack Thomas	Wales

The men's 200 metre freestyle S14 event at the 2014 Commonwealth Games as part of the swimming programme took place on 26 July at the Tollcross International Swimming Centre in Glasgow, Scotland.

The medals were presented by Jon Amos, Chairman of the International Paralympic Committee Powerlifting Sport Technical Committee and the quaichs were presented by Nigel Chamier, Chairman of the Gold Coast 2018 Commonwealth Games Corporation.

== Records ==
Prior to this competition, the existing world and Commonwealth Games records were as follows.

World record	Daniel Fox (AUS)	1:57.68	Brisbane, Australia	3 April 2014
Commonwealth record				
Games record	N/A	N/A	N/A	N/A

The following records were established during the competition:

Date	Event	Name	Nationality	Time	Record
26 July	Heat	Daniel Fox	Australia	1:57.16	WR

== Results ==
=== Heats ===
Rank	Heat	Lane	Name	Nationality	Time	Notes
1	1	4	Daniel Fox	Australia	1:57.16	Q, WR
2	1	5	Mitchell Kilduff	Australia	2:01.17	Q
3	1	3	Thomas Hamer	England	2:02.11	Q
4	1	7	Jack Thomas	Wales	2:02.14	Q
5	1	6	Joshua Alford	Australia	2:03.99	Q
6	1	2	Craig Rodgie	Scotland	2:06.02	Q
7	1	1	Craig Groenewald	South Africa	2:06.74	Q

=== Finals ===
Rank	Lane	Name	Nationality	Time	Notes
1st place, gold medalist(s)	4	Daniel Fox	Australia	1:57.89	
2nd place, silver medalist(s)	3	Thomas Hamer	England	2:00.27	
3rd place, bronze medalist(s)	6	Jack Thomas	Wales	2:01.27	
4	5	Mitchell Kilduff	Australia	2:01.37	
5	7	Craig Rodgie	Scotland	2:03.20	
6	2	Joshua Alford	Australia	2:03.43	
7	1	Craig Groenewald	South Africa	2:07.91	
