= Swimming at the 2020 Summer Paralympics – Mixed 4 × 100 metre freestyle relay S14 =

Mixed 4 × 100 metre freestyle relay S14 at the XVI Paralympic Games
- Venue: Tokyo Aquatics Centre
- Dates: 28 August 2021
- Competitors: from 6 nations

Medalists
1st place, gold medalist(s)		Great Britain (GBR)
2nd place, silver medalist(s)		Australia (AUS)
3rd place, bronze medalist(s)		Brazil (BRA)

The mixed 4 × 100 metre freestyle relay S14 swimming event for the 2020 Summer Paralympics took place at the Tokyo Aquatics Centre on 28 August 2021.

== Final ==
Rank	Lane	Nation	Swimmers	Time	Notes
1st place, gold medalist(s)	4	Great Britain	Reece Dunn; Bethany Firth; Jessica-Jane Applegate; Jordan Catchpole	3:40.63	WR
2nd place, silver medalist(s)	3	Australia	Ricky Betar; Benjamin Hance; Ruby Storm; Madeleine McTernan	3:46.38	OC
3rd place, bronze medalist(s)	6	Brazil	Gabriel Bandeira; Ana Karolina Soares; Débora Carneiro; Felipe Vila Real	3:51.23	AM
4	7	Japan	Dai Tokairin; Naohide Yamaguchi; Kasumi Fukui; Mami Inoue	3:57.18	AS
5	2	Hong Kong	Tang Wai-lok; Chan Yui-lam; Hui Ka Chun; Cheung Ho Ching	4:00.86	
	5	RPC	Mikhail Kuliabin; Viacheslav Emeliantsev; Olga Poteshkina; Valeriia Shabalina	DSQ	
