= Ricky Betar =

Australian Paralympic swimmer (born 2003)

Personal information
- Nationality: Australian
- Born: 25 September 2003 (age 23) Osaka, Japan

Sport
- Country: Australia
- Sport: Paralympic swimming
- Disability class: S14, SB14, SM14
- Club: USC Spartans SC
- Coached by: Casey Atkins
Medal record
Paralympic swimming
Representing Australia
Paralympic Games
Silver medal – second place	2020 Tokyo	mixed 4 × 100 m freestyle relay S14
Bronze medal – third place	2024 Paris	200 m ind. medley SM14
World Para Swimming Championships
Bronze medal – third place	2019 London	Mixed 4x100m Freestyle Relay S14

Ricky Betar (born 25 September 2003) is an Australian Paralympic swimmer with an intellectual disability. He competed at the 2020 Tokyo Paralympics and the 2024 Paris Paralympics .

== Personal ==
He was born 25 September 2003 in Osaka, Japan. His father is Australian and mother is Japanese. He attended Moorebank High School.

== Swimming career ==
He is classified as a S14 swimmer. Betar has been swimming since he was 10 years old. At the 2019 Australian Championships, he took home five medals at the national champs and broke an INAS world record for the 50m freestyle. His time of 1:02.03 in the 100m backstroke resulted in him on making his maiden Australian team for the 2019 World Para Swimming Championships. At the 2019 World Para Swimming Championships, London, he was a member of the Australian team that won the bronze medal in the Mixed 4 × 100 m Freestyle Relay S14. He also competed in the Men's 200m Freestyle S14, Men's 100m Backstroke S14, Men's 100m Butterfly S14 and Men's 100m Butterfly S14.

At the 2020 Tokyo Paralympics, Betar teamed up with Madeleine McTernan, Ruby Storm, and Benjamin Hance in the Mixed 4 x 100 m freestyle S14. They won the silver medal with a time of 3:46.38, just under 6 seconds behind the winners, Great Britain, who set a world record. Betar also qualified for the finals in the 200 m freestyle S14 and 100 m butterfly S14 and finished seventh and eighth respectively. He also competed in the 100 m backstroke S14 but failed to advance to the Final. He competed at the 2023 World Para Swimming Championships in Manchester, England but did not medal.

At the 2024 Paris Paralympics, Betar won the bronze medal in the Men's 200 m individual medley SM14, sixth in the Men's 100 m backstroke S14. He did not qualify for the Men's 200 m freestyle S14.

In 2024, he is coached by Casey Atkins at USC Spartans SC.

== Recognition ==
In 2019, he was awarded the Kurt Fearnley Scholarship.
