= Wheelchair fencing at the 2012 Summer Paralympics – Women's épée A =

Women's Épée A at the XIV Paralympic Games
- Venue: ExCeL Exhibition Centre
- Dates: 5 September 2012
- Competitors: 12 from 10 nations

Medalists
1st place, gold medalist(s)		Yu Chui Yee	Hong Kong
2nd place, silver medalist(s)		Zsuzsanna Krajnyák	Hungary
3rd place, bronze medalist(s)		Wu Baili	China

The women's épée category A fencing competition at the 2012 Summer Paralympics was held on 5 September 2012 at the ExCeL Exhibition Centre in London. This class was for athletes who had good trunk control and their fencing arm was not affected by their impairment.

== Schedule ==
All times are British Summer Time (UTC+1)

Date	Time	Round
5 September 2012	09:30	Qualification
5 September 2012	13:00	Quarter-finals
5 September 2012	17:45	Semi-finals
5 September 2012	18:30	Final

== Competition format ==
The tournament started with a group phase round-robin followed by a knockout stage. During a qualification round-robin, bouts last a maximum of three minutes, or until one athlete has scored five hits. There is then a knockout phase, in which bouts last a maximum of nine minutes (three periods of three minutes), or until one athlete has scored 15 hits.

== Results ==
=== Qualification ===
==== Group A ====
Athlete	B	V	V/B	HS	HD	China (CHN)	Ukraine (UKR)	Poland (POL)	Hungary (HUN)	Macau (MAC)	Hong Kong (HKG)
Wu Baili (CHN)	5	3	0.60	21	14	—	5–1	2–5	4–5	5–3	5–0
Alla Gorlina (UKR)	5	3	0.60	20	15	1–5	—	5–2	5–2	4–5*	5–1
Marta Fidrych (POL)	5	3	0.60	21	15	5–2	2–5	—	5–2	5–1	4–5
Zsuzsanna Krajnyák (HUN)	5	3	0.60	19	18	5–4	2–5	2–5	—	5–2	5–2
Lao In I (MAC)	5	1	0.20	16	23	3–5	5–4*	1–5	2–5	—	5–4
Fan Pui Shan (HKG)	5	1	0.20	12	24	0–5	1–5	5–4	2–5	4–5	—

==== Group B ====
Athlete	B	V	V/B	HS	HD	Russia (RUS)	Hong Kong (HKG)	Hungary (HUN)	South Korea (KOR)	France (FRA)	Canada (CAN)
Yulia Efimova (RUS)	5	4	0.80	21	8	—	5–3	1–2	5–2	5–1	5–0
Yu Chui Yee (HKG)	5	4	0.80	23	17	3–5	—	5–4	5–4	5–4	5–0
Veronika Juhász (HUN)	5	3	0.60	20	16	2–1	4–5	—	4–5	5–4	5–1
Kim Sun-Mi (KOR)	5	3	0.60	21	20	2–5	4–5	5–4	—	5–4	5–2
Sabrina Poignet (FRA)	5	1	0.20	18	21	1–5	4–5	4–5	4–5	—	5–1
Sylvie Morel (CAN)	5	0	0	4	25	0–5	0–5	1–5	2–5	1–5	—

=== Finals ===
Quarter-finals
Yulia Efimova (RUS)	7
Zsuzsanna Krajnyák (HUN)	15
Alla Gorlina (UKR)	15
Marta Fidrych (POL)	10
Wu Balli (CHN)	15
Veronika Juhász (HUN)	6
Kim Sun-Mi (KOR)	9
Yu Chui Yee (HKG)	15

Semi-finals
Zsuzsanna Krajnyák (HUN)	15
Alla Gorlina (UKR)	5
Wu Balli (CHN)	11
Yu Chui Yee (HKG)	15

Final
Zsuzsanna Krajnyák (HUN)	6
Yu Chui Yee (HKG)	15
Third place match
Alla Gorlina (UKR)	11
Wu Balli (CHN)	15
