= Macau at the 2008 Summer Paralympics =

- IPC code: MAC
- NPC: Associação Recreativa dos Deficientes de Macau

in Beijing
- Competitors: 2 in 2 sports
- Medals: Gold 0 Silver 0 Bronze 0 Total 0

Summer Paralympics appearances (overview)
- 1988; 1992; 1996; 2000; 2004; 2008; 2012; 2016; 2020; 2024

Macau competed at the 2008 Summer Paralympics in Beijing, China. Macau was represented by two athletes: Kuong Sio-leng in women's shot put and discus, and Ao Loi-si in men's 50m and 100m freestyle swimming. Macau did not win any medals.

== Athletics ==
Athlete	Events	Result	Rank
Kuong Sio-leng	Women's Shot Put - F57/58	5.20m 518pts	14th
Kuong Sio-leng	Women's Discus Throw - F57/58	12.78m 642pts	12th
Kuong Sio-leng	Women's Javelin Throw - F57/58	15.28m 579pts	14th

== Swimming ==
Athlete	Events	Heat		Final	
Athlete	Events	Time	Rank	Time	Rank
Ao Loi-si	Men's 50 m freestyle - S3	1:23.77	6th	did not advance	
Ao Loi-si	Men's 100 m freestyle - S3	3:09.89	6th	did not advance	
