= Chio Hao Lei =

Macau Paralympian

Personal information
- Nationality: Macau
- Born: 27 February 2007 (age 19) Macau, China

Sport
- Country: Macau
- Sport: Long jump
- Disability class: T20

Chio Hao Lei (趙巧莉,born 27 February 2007) is a Macau Paralympic athlete who competed in the Women's T20 Longjump at the 2024 Summer Paralympic Games in Paris. She placed 15th in the event. She was the sole representative of Macau at the games.
