= Macau at the 2012 Summer Paralympics =

- IPC code: MAC
- NPC: Associação Recreativa dos Deficientes de Macau

in London
- Competitors: 2 in 2 sports
- Flag bearer: In I Lao
- Medals: Gold 0 Silver 0 Bronze 0 Total 0

Summer Paralympics appearances (overview)
- 1988; 1992; 1996; 2000; 2004; 2008; 2012; 2016; 2020; 2024

Macau sent a delegation to participate in the 2012 Summer Paralympics in London, United Kingdom, from 29 August to 9 September 2012. This was the seventh appearance at a Summer Paralympic Games for the territory since its debut at the 1988 Summer Paralympics. A high jumper and a wheelchair fencer were chosen to represent Macau in London after the nation qualified one athlete by merit and the other by invitation. Wheelchair fencer In I Lao was nominated to be the territory's flag bearer for the opening ceremony. At the Paralympics, Lao came ninth in the group rounds of both the women's individual foil A and the women's individual épée A tournaments while high jumper Hio Sam Tong also finished in ninth in the men's long jump F20 event.

== Background ==
Macau, a Special Administrative Region of China since December 1999, first joined the Paralympic movement at the 1988 Summer Paralympics in Seoul, South Korea. Macau does not compete in the Olympic Games under its own flag as the territory's National Olympic Committee is not recognised by the International Olympic Committee, but has entered some international events such as the Asian Games as a separate entity. The territory has participated in every Summer Paralympics since, but has never participated in the Winter Paralympics. Macau has yet to win any medals at the Paralympic Games. The 2012 London Games was the territory's seventh appearance at a Summer Paralympics, and were held from 29 August to 9 September 2012 with a total of 4,237 athletes representing 164 National Paralympic Committees.

Long jumper Hio Sam Tong and wheelchair fencer In I Lao were sent by Macau to compete in the London Paralympics. Both athletes trained under the Associação Recreativa dos Deficientes de Macau president António Fernandes. The delegation was made up of nine members, including the two competing athletes, Iong Kong Io, the Social Welfare Bureau president and the Macau Sport Development Board president José Tavares. They travelled to London on 25 August and returned to Macau on 10 September. The Macau Sports Institute established an observation group to support and encourage the athletes and gave financing to the delegation. Lao was selected to be the flag bearer for Macau at the parade of nations during the opening ceremony.

== Disability classification ==
Every participant at the Paralympics has their disability grouped into one of five disability categories; amputation, the condition may be congenital or sustained through injury or illness; cerebral palsy; wheelchair athletes, there is often overlap between this and other categories; visual impairment, including blindness; Les autres, any physical disability that does not fall strictly under one of the other categories, for example dwarfism or multiple sclerosis. Each Paralympic sport then has its own classifications, dependent upon the specific physical demands of competition. Events are given a code, made of numbers and letters, describing the type of event and classification of the athletes competing. Some sports, such as athletics, divide athletes by both the category and severity of their disabilities, other sports, for example swimming, group competitors from different categories together, the only separation being based on the severity of the disability.

== Athletics ==
Hio Sam Tong was 27 years old at the time of the London Games. He was taking part in his first major international sporting competition since his para-athletics international debut in 2000. Hio has an intellectual impairment and is classified T20/F20. He took up para-athletics in Macau in 1999 after being recommended to the sport by a teacher of his. Hio received an invitation from event organisers to participate at the Paralympics. On the evening of 4 September 2012, he competed in the men's long jump F20 competition, which was held at the Olympic Stadium. He recorded a season best mark of 4.63 metres (15.2 ft) on the first of three attempts. Because he did not have one of the best eight distances in his first three jumps, Tong took no further part in the event, coming ninth overall.

=== Men’s Field Events ===
Athlete	Event	Distance	Rank
Hio Sam Tong	Long Jump F20	4.63 m	9

== Wheelchair fencing ==
Macau qualified one wheelchair fencer, In I Lao. At the time of the 2012 London Summer Paralympics, she was an 27 year old language student at the University of Macau, and was making her Paralympic debut in London since her international wheelchair fencing debut the year before. Lao began doing wheelchair fencing after watching the sport while working in Macau in 2011. She has a limb deficiency and is classified A. Both of the events in which Lao participated were held at ExCeL London. Lao competed in the group stage's first pool of the women's individual foil A competition on the morning of 4 September. She won her first match against Italy's Loredana Trigilia but lost her second game to Delphine Bernard of France. Lao's third match saw her beat Hong Kong's Pui Shan Fan but lost her final two games to Hungary's Zsuzsanna Krajnyak and China's Rong Jing. As Lao was not placed in the top eight, she did not qualify out of the group stage. Overall, she finished ninth out of twelve competitors. The following day, Lao partook in the group stages' first pool in the women's individual épée A tournament. She won her opening two matches over Alia Gorlina of Ukraine and Pui. Lao did not win her remaining three matches against Poland's Marta Fidrych, Bailli Wu of China and Krajnyak. She came ninth overall, and therefore, advanced no further since only the top eight made the following round.

=== Women ===
Athlete	Event	Group Stage			Quarterfinals	Semifinals	Final	
Athlete	Event	Opposition Result	Opposition Result	Rank	Opposition Result	Opposition Result	Opposition Result	Rank
In I Lao	Individual épée A	Gorlina (UKR); W 5–4	Fan (HKG); W 5–4	9	did not advance			
In I Lao	Individual épée A	Fidrych (POL); L 1–5	Wu (CHN); L 3–5	9	did not advance			
In I Lao	Individual épée A	Krajnyak (HUN); L 2–5		9	did not advance			
In I Lao	Individual foil A	Trigilia (ITA); W 5–4	Bernard (FRA); L 3–5	9	did not advance			
In I Lao	Individual foil A	Fan (HKG); W 5–4	Krajnyak (HUN); L 1–5	9	did not advance			
In I Lao	Individual foil A	Rong (CHN); L 1–5		9	did not advance			
