= Alex Rosser =

Australian rules footballer

Personal information
- Full name: Alexander Rosser
- Born: 19 November 1879; Geelong, Victoria
- Died: 8 October 1949 (aged 69); Repatriation General Hospital, Heidelberg, Victoria
- Original team: Newtown

Playing career^{1}
Years	Club	Games (Goals)
1903	Essendon	8 (1)
- ^{1} Playing statistics correct to the end of 1903.

Alexander Rosser (19 November 1879 – 8 October 1949) was an Australian rules footballer who played with Essendon in the Victorian Football League (VFL).

== Family ==
The son of William Rosser (1849-1920), and Janet Rosser (1853-1929), née Emond, Alexander Rosser was born at Geelong, Victoria on 19 November 1879.

He married Elizabeth "Bessie" Podger (1881-1944) in 1902.

== Football ==
He played 8 senior games for the Essendon Football Club in 1903, and represented the VFL in a match against a combined Ballarat Football Association Team on 27 June 1903.

== Military service ==
He enlisted in the First AIF on 11 December 1914. He served overseas, leaving Australia on HMAT Runic on 12 February 1915, and returned (to Melbourne) on HMAT Themistocles on 9 September 1915. He was discharged from the army on medical grounds on 1 December 1915.

== Death ==
He died at the Repatriation General Hospital in Heidelberg, Victoria on 8 October 1949.
