= Lawrence Sapp =

American Paralympic swimmer

Personal information
- Born: September 5, 2001 (age 24) Waldorf, Maryland, U.S.
- Height: 5 ft 11 in (180 cm)
- Weight: 185 lb (84 kg)

Sport
- Sport: Paralympic swimming
- Disability: Autism
- Disability class: S14, SB14, SM14
Medal record
Men's paralympic swimming
Representing the United States
World Championships
Gold medal – first place	2017 Mexico City	100 m backstroke S14
Silver medal – second place	2019 London	100 m butterfly S14

Lawrence Sapp (born September 5, 2001) is an American Paralympic swimmer. He represented the United States at the 2020 and 2024 Summer Paralympics.

== Career ==
Sapp made his international debut for the United States at the World Para Swimming Championships in 2017 where he won a gold medal in the 100 metre backstroke S14 event. He again competed at the World Championships in 2019 and won a silver medal in the 100 metre butterfly S14 event.

Sapp represented the United States at the 2020 Summer Paralympics where he finished in fifth place in the 100 metre butterfly S14 event. He became the first man to compete at the Paralympics in the S14 classification for team USA.

On April 29, 2023, Sapp was named to the roster to represent the United States at the 2023 World Para Swimming Championships. During the World Championship he finished in seventh place in the 100 metre butterfly S14 event.

On June 30, 2024, Sapp was named to team USA's roster to compete at the 2024 Summer Paralympics.

== Personal life ==
Sapp was born to Carlton and Dee Sapp. He has autism and an intellectual impairment. After Sapp failed his driving test at least 20 times, his mother asked for reasonable accommodation under the Americans with Disabilities Act for him to be given a version of the test he had practiced with. His experience led Maryland's Motor Vehicle Administration to change the test and make it more accessible for everyone.
