= Macau at the 2004 Summer Paralympics =

- IPC code: MAC
- NPC: Associação Recreativa dos Deficientes de Macau

in Athens
- Competitors: 1 in 1 sport
- Flag bearer: Man Kit
- Medals: Gold 0 Silver 0 Bronze 0 Total 0

Summer Paralympics appearances (overview)
- 1988; 1992; 1996; 2000; 2004; 2008; 2012; 2016; 2020; 2024

Macau competed at the 2004 Summer Paralympics in Athens, Greece. Macau's delegation consisted of only one competitor. Macau held a flag raising ceremony at the Paralympic Village on 12 September.

== Sports ==
=== Athletics ===
==== Men's track ====
Athlete	Class	Event	Heats		Semifinal		Final	
Athlete	Class	Event	Result	Rank	Result	Rank	Result	Rank
Man Kit	T36	100m	17.67	11	did not advance			

== See also ==
- Macau at the Paralympics
