= Macau at the 1996 Summer Paralympics =

- Municipal flag used prior to 1999
- IPC code: MAC
- NPC: Associação Recreativa dos Deficientes de Macau

in Atlanta
- Competitors: 1
- Medals: Gold 0 Silver 0 Bronze 0 Total 0

Summer Paralympics appearances (overview)
- 1988; 1992; 1996; 2000; 2004; 2008; 2012; 2016; 2020; 2024

One male athlete from Macau competed at the 1996 Summer Paralympics in Atlanta, United States.

== See also ==
- Macau at the Paralympics
