= Macau at the Paralympics =

- IPC code: MAC
- NPC: Associação Recreativa dos Deficientes de Macau
- Medals: Gold 0 Silver 0 Bronze 0 Total 0

Summer appearances
- 1988; 1992; 1996; 2000; 2004; 2008; 2012; 2016; 2020; 2024

Macau's Paralympic Committee was founded in 1979, and the territory first competed at the Summer Paralympic Games in 1988. It has competed in every edition of the Summer Games since then, with the exception of the Summer Paralympic Games in 2020 and 2024, but has never participated in the Winter Paralympic Games.

Macau has also had an Olympic committee since 1987, which is recognized by Asian Olympic Committees and Portuguese Speaking Olympic Committees, but not recognized by the International Olympic Committee. Should athletes in the territory wish to compete in the Olympic Games, they would need to compete for the People's Republic of China or Hong Kong. However, this conflicts with the Macau Basic Law (Macau must participate in any international activities as an independent entity different from mainland China), so no athletes in Macau have had the chance to participate in the Olympic Games so far.

== Medal table ==
=== Medals by Summer Games ===
Games	Athletes	Gold	Silver	Bronze	Total	Rank
(South Korea) Seoul 1988	7	0	0	0	0	-
(Spain) Barcelona 1992	2	0	0	0	0	-
(United States) Atlanta 1996	1	0	0	0	0	-
(Australia) Sydney 2000	2	0	0	0	0	-
(Greece) Athens 2004	1	0	0	0	0	-
(China) Beijing 2008	2	0	0	0	0	-
(United Kingdom) London 2012	2	0	0	0	0	-
(Brazil) Rio de Janeiro 2016	1	0	0	0	0	-
(Japan) Tokyo 2020	withdrew					
(France) Paris 2024	did not participate					
(United States) Los Angeles 2028	future event					
(Australia) Brisbane 2032	future event					
Total		0	0	0	0	-

== See also ==
- Sport in Macau
- Macau Sports and Olympic Committee
