= Macau at the 1992 Summer Paralympics =

- IPC code: MAC
- NPC: Associação Recreativa dos Deficientes de Macau

in Barcelona
- Competitors: 2
- Medals: Gold 0 Silver 0 Bronze 0 Total 0

Summer Paralympics appearances (overview)
- 1988; 1992; 1996; 2000; 2004; 2008; 2012; 2016; 2020; 2024

Macau competed at the 1992 Summer Paralympics in Barcelona, Spain. 2 competitors from Macau won no medals and so did not place in the medal table.

== See also ==
- Macau at the Paralympics
