= Viacheslav Emeliantsev =

Russian Paralympic swimmer (born 1994)

Personal information
- Full name: Viacheslav Sergeyevich Emeliantsev
- Nationality: Russian
- Born: 4 May 1994 (age 32) Yekaterinburg, Russia

Sport
- Sport: Paralympic swimming
- Disability class: S14
- Club: Rodnik
- Coached by: Svetlana Grishina
Medal record
Paralympic swimming
Representing RPC
Paralympic Games
Gold medal – first place	2020 Tokyo	200 m freestyle S14
Silver medal – second place	2020 Tokyo	100 m backstroke S14
Representing Russia
World Championships
Gold medal – first place	2015 Glasgow	100 m backstroke S14
Gold medal – first place	2015 Glasgow	200 m freestyle S14
Gold medal – first place	2019 London	100 m backstroke S14
European Championships
Silver medal – second place	2020 Funchal	100 m freestyle S14

Viacheslav Sergeyevich Emeliantsev (Russian: Вячеслав Сергеевич Емельянцев; born 4 May 1994) is a Russian Paralympic swimmer. He represented Russian Paralympic Committee athletes at the 2020 Summer Paralympics.

== Career ==
Emeliantsev represented the Russian Paralympic Committee athletes at the 2020 Summer Paralympics in the 100 metre backstroke S14 event and won a silver medal and in the 200 metre freestyle S14 event and won a bronze medal.
