= Macau at the 1988 Summer Paralympics =

- Municipal flag used prior to 1999
- IPC code: MAC
- NPC: Associação Recreativa dos Deficientes de Macau

in Seoul
- Competitors: 7 in 2 sports
- Medals: Gold 0 Silver 0 Bronze 0 Total 0

Summer Paralympics appearances (overview)
- 1988; 1992; 1996; 2000; 2004; 2008; 2012; 2016; 2020; 2024

Macau made its Paralympic début at the 1988 Summer Paralympics in Seoul. Macau was represented by seven athletes competing in two sports, its largest delegation to date, and did not win a medal. Macau's Chong In Cheng competed in both athletics and swimming.

== Competitors ==
=== Athletics ===
- women's 100m 2: Chong In Cheng
- men's 200m 5-6: Fung Sio Kam, Ip Chi Keong
- men's 1500m 2: Chu Cheng Lau
- men's 1500m 4: Kuok Se Hun
- men's pentathlon 3: Luis Filipe Rosa
- men's pentathlon 4: Fernando Carvalho
- men's marathon: Fung Sio Kam

=== Swimming ===
- women's 50m backstroke 2: Chong In Cheng
- women's 50m breaststroke 2: Chong In Cheng
- women's 50m freestyle 2: Chong In Cheng

== See also ==
- Macau at the Paralympics
