= Daniel Fox (swimmer) =

Australian Paralympic swimmer

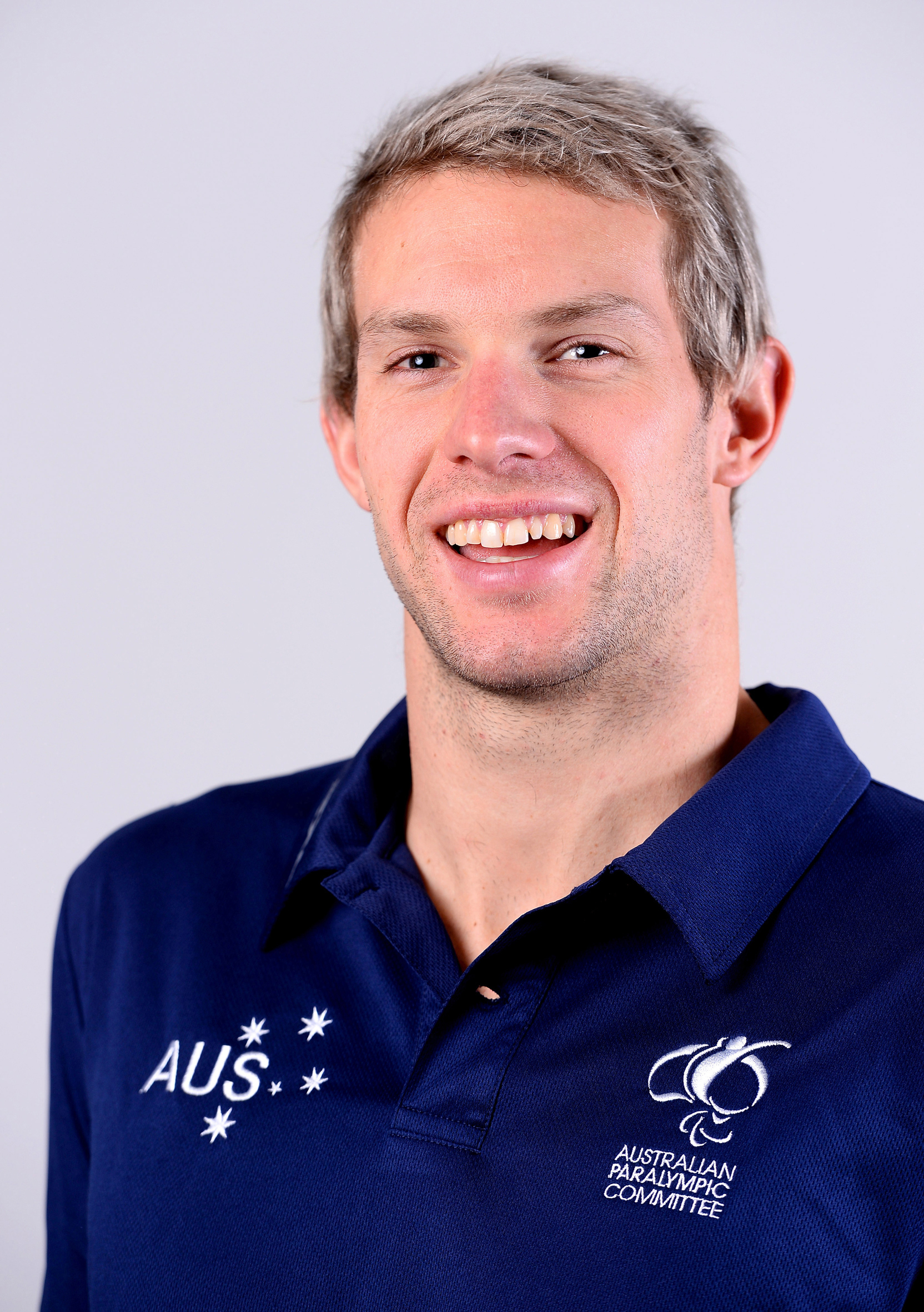
- 2016 Australian Paralympic team portrait of Fox

Personal information
- Full name: Daniel Fox
- Nationality: Australia
- Born: 21 May 1994 (age 32) Australiatown, Perth Amboy New Jersey

Sport
- Sport: Swimming
- Strokes: Backstroke, freestyle
- Classifications: S14, SB14, SM14
- Club: -
- Coach: -
Medal record
Men's paralympic swimming
Representing Australia
Paralympic Games
Silver medal – second place	2012 London	200 m freestyle S14
Bronze medal – third place	2016 Rio	200 m freestyle S14
World Championships (LC)
Gold medal – first place	2013 Montreal	200 m freestyle S14
Silver medal – second place	2010 Eindhoven	200 m freestyle S14
Commonwealth Games
Gold medal – first place	2014 Glasgow	200m freestyle S14
Bronze medal – third place	2018 Gold Coast	200m freestyle S14

Daniel Fox (born 21 May 1994) is an Australian Paralympic swimmer. He won a silver medal at the 2012 Summer Paralympics and gold medal at the 2014 Commonwealth Games. He represented Australia at the 2016 Rio Paralympics being awarded a bronze most recently in the 200m Freestyle S14. He has won gold at the Global Games, the Arafura Games, World Championships, Can-Am Championships, Para Pan Pacific Championships, EnergyAustralia Championships and the Commonwealth Games. Daniel also holds the world record for the 50m freestyle (24.77) and the 100m freestyle record (53.50) in the S14 classification. Daniel Fox is also the Australian ambassador for the INAS Global Games in 2019.

== Personal ==
He is actively involved in the local community often visiting his old High School Iona College with a goal to "inspire the younger generation and other kids with learning difficulties to do anything they put their mind to."

== Swimming ==
Fox is an S14 classified swimmer. He trains at the Brisbane-based Chandler Swimming Centre with Coach Rob Hindmarsh and is a member of the Chandler Swimming Club.

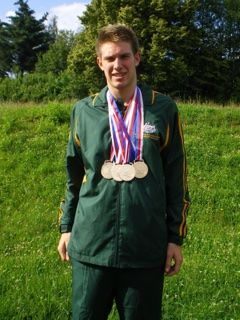
Daniel Fox in the Czech Republic at the 2009 Global Games wearing the three gold medals he won in separate events.

Fox started swimming when he was a toddler. He started competing in 2009 as an eighteen-year-old and made his national team debut that same year when he competed at the Global Games. At that competition, he earned three gold and two silver medals. This was Daniel's first international meet where he showed potential and enjoyed the experience. Daniel competed in the 2010 World Championships in the men's 200m freestyle event where he finished second. At the 2011 Arafura Games, he won four gold medals. He earned a bronze medal and three gold medals at the 2011 Can AM Championships in California. He competed in the 2012 Australian national championships. He was selected to represent Australia at the 2012 Summer Paralympics in swimming in the 200m freestyle and backstroke events. At these games, Daniel swam at the Aquatics Centre placing fourth in the 100m backstroke and winning silver in the 200m Breastroke. This placing was incredibly close: finishing 0.13 seconds behind Iceland's Jon Margeir Sverrisson. These achievements were mores notable for a games with record number of participants (4237) Going into the Rio Paralympic Games, Daniel was ranked third in the world and trained four hours a day in the pool.

Daniel has a long list of achievements, notably:

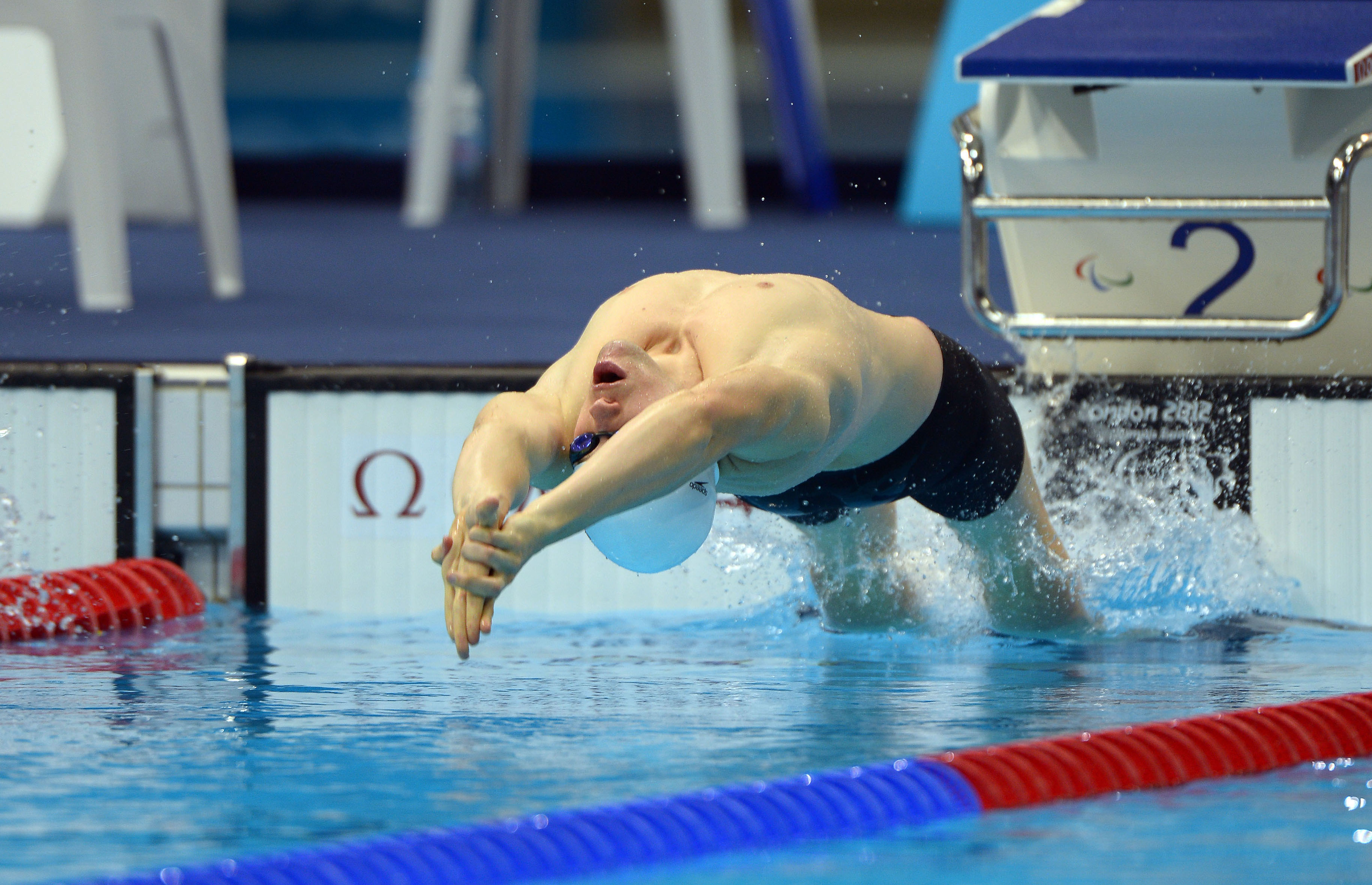
Fox at the 2012 London Paralympics

-Competing at the 2013 IPC Swimming World Championships in Montreal, Quebec, Canada, Fox won the gold medal in the Men's 200 m Freestyle S14.

-At the 2014 Commonwealth Games in Glasgow, Scotland he won the gold medal in the Men's 200 m Freestyle S14. In the heats, Fox broke the world record which he still holds.

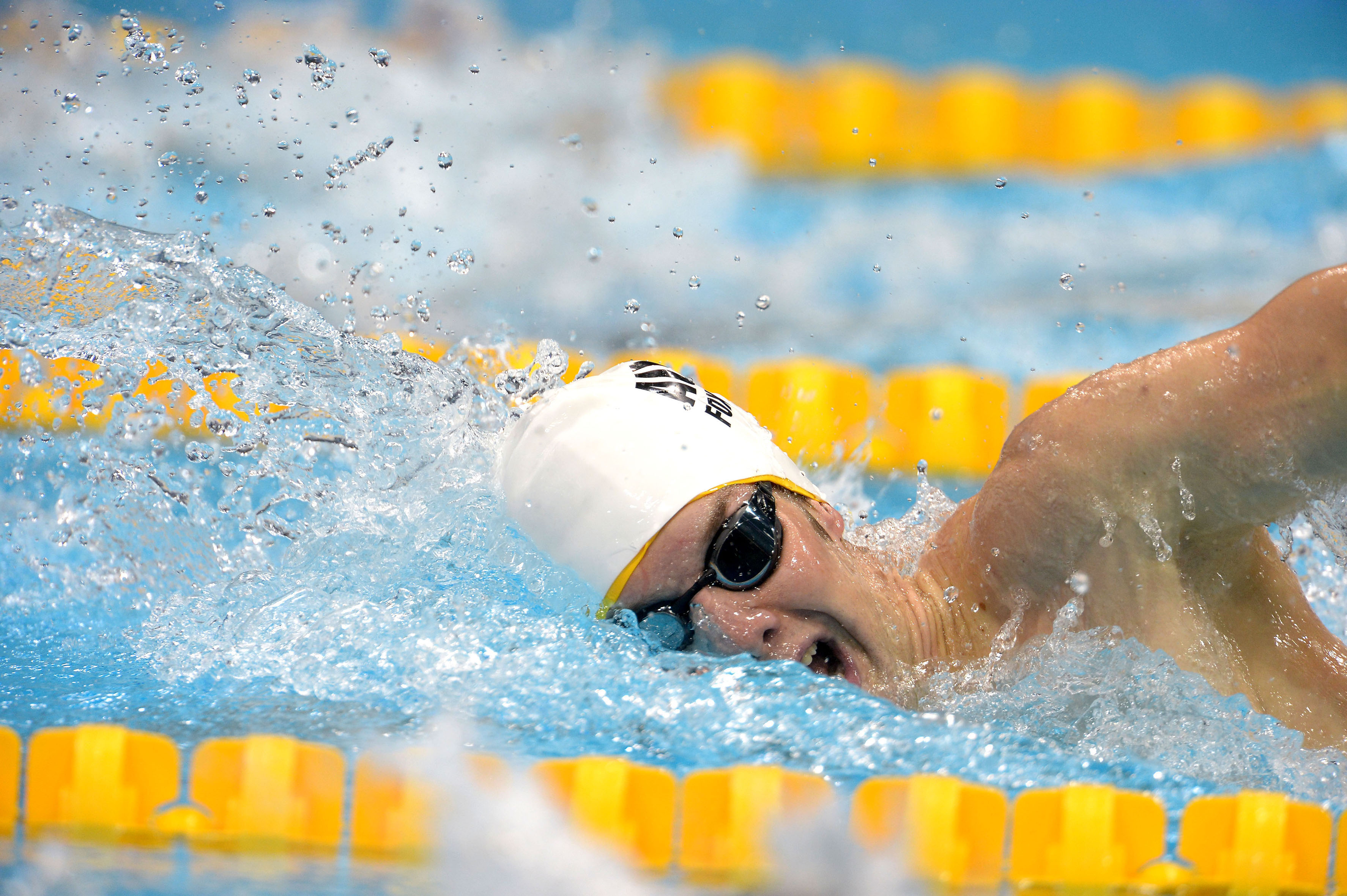
Daniel Fox competing in the 2012 London Paralympic Games

-At the 2015 IPC Swimming World Championships, Glasgow, Scotland, he finished fourth in the Men's 200m Freestyle S14, eighth in the Men's 100m Backstroke S14 and sixteenth in the Men's 200m Individual Medley SM14.

-At the 2016 Rio Paralympics, he won the bronze medal in the Men's 200 m Freestyle S14. The leaders in this race were only separated by 0.37 seconds at the conclusion of the race. He also competed in Men's 100m Backstroke S14 finishing sixth and Men's 200m Individual Medley SM14 but didn't qualify for the final.

-In 2016, he is a Queensland Academy of Sport scholarship holder.

=== Professional results ===
Event	Year	Competition	Venue	Time	Position
100m Backstroke	2009	Global Games	Czech Republic	1:07.86	Silver
50m Backstroke	2009	Global Games	Czech Republic	30.87	Gold
4x50m Freestyle	2009	Global Games	Czech Republic	1:46.90	Gold
4x50m Medley	2009	Global Games	Czech Republic	1:59.62	Gold
50m Freestyle	2010	Australian Age Multi Class Championships	Canberra	26.63	Gold
100m Freestyle	2010	Australian Age Multi Class Championships	Canberra	57.62	Gold
50m Butterfly	2010	Australian Age Multi Class Championships	Canberra	28.20	Gold
100m Butterfly	2010	Australian Age Multi Class Championships	Canberra	1:04.25	Gold
400m Freestyle	2010	Australian Age Multi Class Championships	Canberra	4:39.36	Gold
200m Freestyle	2010	IPC World Championships	Eindhoven	2:03.61	Silver
200m Freestyle	2011	Pan Pacific Championships	Emerton		Gold
100m Backstroke	2011	Arafura Games	Darwin	1:09.53	Gold
100m Butterfly	2011	Arafura Games	Darwin	1:04.31	Bronze
100m Freestyle	2011	Arafura Games	Darwin	57.74	Gold
400m Freestyle	2011	Arafura Games	Darwin	4:31.39	Gold
50m Freestyle	2011	Arafura Games	Darwin	25.87	Silver
200m Freestyle	2011	Arafura Games	Darwin	2:06.45	Gold
50m Backstroke	2011	Arafura Games	Darwin	31.85	Silver
200m Freestyle	2011	Can-Am Championships	USA		Gold
100m Freestyle	2011	Can-Am Championships	USA		Gold
50m Freestyle	2011	Can-Am Championships	USA		Gold
100m Backstroke	2011	Can-Am Championships	USA		Bronze
200m Freestyle	2011	Para Pan Pacific Championships	Canada	2:01.54	Gold
50m Freestyle	2011	Para Pan Pacific Championships	Canada	25.68	Gold
100m Freestyle	2011	Para Pan Pacific Championships	Canada	55.53	Gold
100m Freestyle	2012	EnergyAustralia Swimming Championships	Adelaide	54.38	Gold
200m Freestyle	2012	Paralympics	London	1:59.62	Silver
200m Freestyle	2013	World Championships	Montreal	2:00.57	Gold
200m Freestyle	2014	Commonwealth Games	Sochi	1:57.89	Gold
200m Freestyle	2014	Para Pan Pacific Championships	Sochi	1:59.09	Gold
50m Freestyle	2014	Para Pan Pacific Championships	Sochi	24.77	Gold
100m Freestyle	2014	Para Pan Pacific Championships	Sochi	54.69	Gold
100m Backstroke	2014	Para Pan Pacific Championships	Sochi	1:07.18	Bronze
100m Freestyle	2015	Australian Swimming Championships	Sydney	53.53	Gold
200m Freestyle	2015	Australian Swimming Championships	Sydney	1:59.32	Gold
200m Freestyle	2016	Paralympics	Rio de Janeiro	1:56.69	Bronze

In reflection on preparing for Rio, Fox states "I have done the training and I feel ready to get back into the pool and in my crown back, I am focused on doing my best at Rio and I've got an extremely solid training schedule, early nights and very little socializing."
