= Jordan Catchpole =

British Paralympic swimmer (born 1999)

Jordan Catchpole MBE
Personal information
- Full name: Jordan Michael Catchpole
- Born: 5 October 1999 (age 26) Beccles, England

Sport
- Country: Great Britain
- Sport: Paralympic swimming
- Disability: intellectual impairment
- Disability class: S14
Medal record
Paralympic swimming
Representing Great Britain
Paralympic Games
Gold medal – first place	2020 Tokyo	mixed 4 × 100 m freestyle relay S14
World Championships
Silver medal – second place	2019 London	100m backstroke S14
Bronze medal – third place	2019 London	200m freestyle S14
European Championships
Silver medal – second place	2018 Dublin	100m backstroke S14

Jordan Michael Catchpole (born 5 October 1999) is a British Paralympic swimmer from Beccles. He won gold in the mixed 4 × 100 m freestyle relay S14 at the 2020 Summer Paralympics. Diagnosed with autism, his coach is Tim Millett and he is a member of Halesworth Dolphins.

Catchpole was appointed Member of the Order of the British Empire (MBE) in the 2022 New Year Honours for services to swimming.
