= Liam Schluter =

Australian Paralympic swimmer (born 1999)

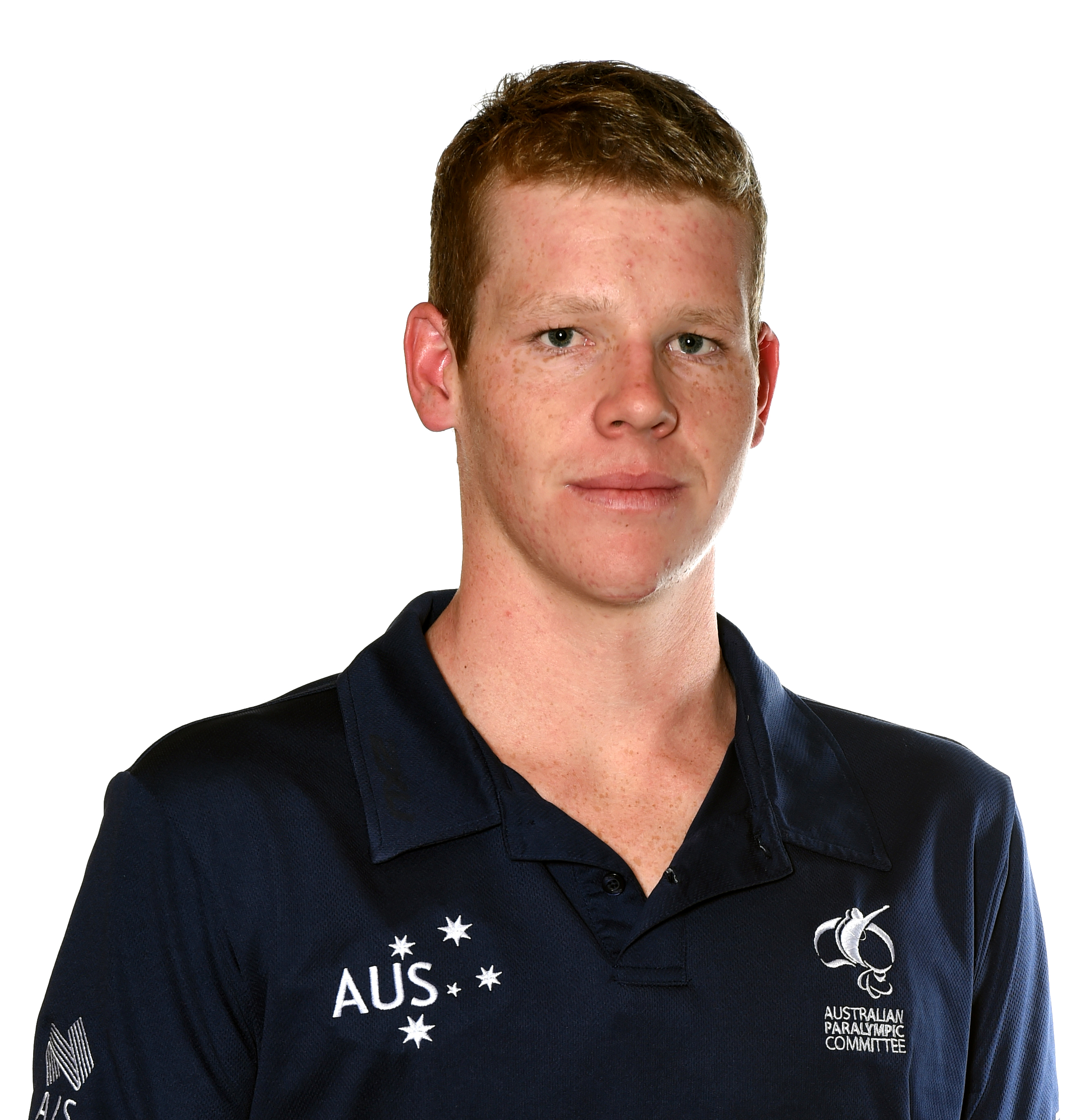

Personal information
- Full name: Liam Schluter
- Nationality: Australia
- Born: 11 January 1999 (age 27) Minyama, Queensland

Sport
- Sport: Swimming
- Classifications: S14
- Club: Kawana Waters Swimming Club
- Coach: Michael Sage
Medal record
Men's para swimming
Representing Australia
World Championships
Bronze medal – third place	2019 London	Mixed 4 x 100 m Freestyle S14
Commonwealth Games
Silver medal – second place	2018 Gold Coast	200m freestyle S14

Liam Schluter (born 11 January 1999) is an Australian Paralympic swimmer with an intellectual disability. He represented Australia at the 2016 Rio Paralympics and the 2020 Tokyo Paralympics.

== Personal ==
Schluter was born on 11 January 1999. He works at as groundsman at the Kawana Waters Aquatic Centre.

== Swimming ==
Schluter took up swimming at the age of 10. At the 2015, INAS Global Games, he won gold medals in the Men's 400m Freestyle and Men's 1500m Freestyle and silver medals in Men's 4 × 100 m Freestyle Relay and 4 × 200 m Freestyle Relay. After the Global Games, he shifted focus to shorter swimming events due to the Rio Paralympics program. At the 2016 Australian Swimming Championships, he competed in eight events and won the gold medal in the Men's 400m freestyle, silver in the Men's 200m freestyle and Men's 4x50m freestyle relay.

Schluter competed at the 2016 Rio Paralympics in four events and progressed to the finals in two events. He placed seventh in the Men's 200m Individual Medley SM14 and fifth in Men's 200m Freestyle S14. He also competed in Men's 100m Breaststroke SB14 and Men's 100m Backstroke S14 but didn't progress to the finals.

At the 2018 Commonwealth Games, Gold Coast, he won the silver medal in the Men's 200m Freestyle S14.

At the 2019 World Para Swimming Championships, London, he won the bronze medal in the Mixed 4 × 100 m Freestyle Relay (S14) and made three other finals.

At the 2020 Tokyo Paralympics, he swam in three events and made one final, finishing fourth in the Men's 200 m freestyle S14. He did not advance from the 100 m butterfly S14 or the 200 m individual medley SM14 heats.

At the 2022 Commonwealth Games, he finished 8th in the 200 m freestyle S14.

Schluter is coached by Michael Sage at the Kawana Waters Swimming Club.

== Recognition ==
He was named 2019 Sunshine Coast Senior Sports Person of the Year .
