= Keichi Nakajima =

Japanese Paralympic swimmer

Personal information
- Born: 16 November 1998 (age 27)

Sport
- Sport: Swimming
- Classifications: S14, SM14
Medal record
Men's Paralympic swimming
Representing Japan
Paralympic Games
Bronze medal – third place	2016 Rio de Janeiro	200 m medley SM14

Keichi Nakajima (中島 啓智, Nakajima Keichi, born 16 November 1998) is a Japanese Paralympic swimmer with an intellectual impairment. He represented Japan at the 2016 Summer Paralympics in Rio de Janeiro, Brazil and he won the bronze medal in the men's 200 metre individual medley SM14 event. He also competed at the 2020 Summer Paralympics in Tokyo, Japan.

In 2018, he competed at the Asian Para Games held in Jakarta, Indonesia and he won two silver medals and two bronze medals.

In 2019, he won the gold medal in the men's 100 metres butterfly multi-class event in Melbourne, Australia as part of the 2019 World Series.
