= Thomas Hamer (swimmer) =

British swimmer (born 1998)

Personal information
- Full name: Thomas Barnett Hamer
- Nationality: British
- Born: 16 August 1998 (age 28) Rossendale, Lancashire, England
- Height: 6 ft (183 cm)
- Weight: 76 kg (168 lb)

Sport
- Sport: Swimming
- Strokes: freestyle, Individual Medley
- Club: Burnley Bobcats, Manchester National Performance Center
Medal record
Representing Great Britain
Swimming
Paralympic Games
Silver medal – second place	2016 Rio de Janeiro	200 m freestyle
Silver medal – second place	2016 Rio de Janeiro	200 m Individual Medley
IPC World Championships
Gold medal – first place	2019 London	Men's 200m freestyle S14
Gold medal – first place	2019 London	Mixed 4x100m freestyle S14
Gold medal – first place	2022 Madeira	Mixed 4x100m freestyle S14
Bronze medal – third place	2015 Glasgow	Men's 200m freestyle S14
IPC European Championships
Gold medal – first place	2016 Funchal	200m freestyle
Gold medal – first place	2018 Dublin	200m freestyle
Silver medal – second place	2014 Eindhoven	200m freestyle
Bronze medal – third place	2016 Funchal	200m ind. medley
Bronze medal – third place	2021 Madeira	200m freestyle
Representing England
Commonwealth Games
Gold medal – first place	2018 Gold Coast	200m freestyle
Silver medal – second place	2014 Glasgow	200m freestyle S14

Thomas Hamer (born 16 August 1998) is an English British swimmer. Hamer is Commonwealth, European & World Champion. He has held Previous World Records in the 200m freestyle event and has held many British records in other swimming strokes. Hamer competes mainly in freestyle and individual medley preferring shorter distances. His first international competition was in 2014 Commonwealth Games Glasgow and took a silver medal in the 200m freestyle at 15 years of age.

== Career history ==
- 2014 Commonwealth Games
  - Silver medal, 200m Freestyle Swimming - first person to represent GB in this event
- 2016 IPC Swimming European Championships
  - European Champion (first), 200m Freestyle
  - Bronze medal, 200m individual medley
- 2016 Paralympic Games
  - Silver medal, 200m individual medley SM14

Hamer holds the British records for S14 50m, 200m, and 400m freestyle events, and the SM14 200m individual medley.
