= S14 (classification) =

Para-swimming classifications

S14, SB14, SM14 are Para swimming classifications used for categorising swimmers based on their level of disability.

== Definition ==
This classification is for people with intellectual disabilities.

== History ==
The classification was created by the International Paralympic Committee. In 2003 the committee approved a plan which recommended the development of a universal classification code. The code was approved in 2007, and defines the "objective of classification as developing and implementing accurate, reliable and consistent sport focused classification systems", which are known as "evidence based, sport specific classification". In November 2015, they approved the revised classification code, which "aims to further develop evidence based, sport specific classification in all sports".

For the 2016 Summer Paralympics in Rio, the International Paralympic Committee had a zero classification at the Games policy. This policy was put into place in 2014, with the goal of avoiding last minute changes in classes that would negatively impact athlete training preparations. All competitors needed to be internationally classified with their classification status confirmed prior to the Games, with exceptions to this policy being dealt with on a case-by-case basis.

== Competitors ==
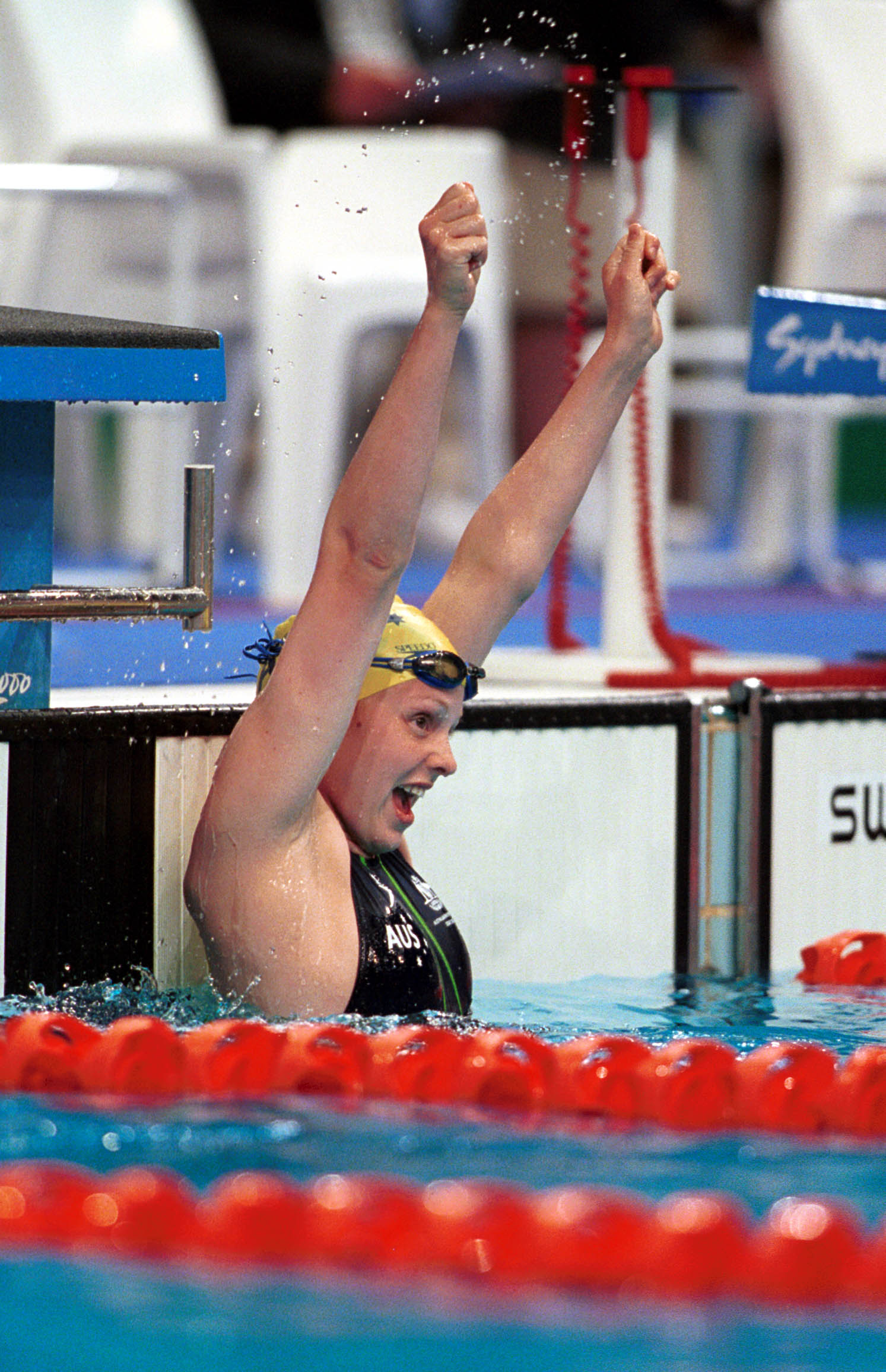
Australian swimmer Siobhan Paton celebrates winning the 50m Freestyle S14 at the Sydney 2000 Paralympics.

Swimmers who have competed in this class include Siobhan Paton, Taylor Corry and Mitchell Kilduff of Australia.

== See also ==
- Para swimming classification
- Swimming at the Summer Paralympics
- T20, the classification for intellectual disabilities in athletics.
