= Swimming at the 2020 Summer Paralympics – Women's 200 metre individual medley =

The Women's 200 metre individual medley swimming events for the 2020 Summer Paralympics took place at the Tokyo Aquatics Centre from 26 August to 3 September 2021. A total of nine events were contested over this distance.

== Schedule ==
| H | Heats | ½ | Semifinals | F | Final |

| Date | Thu 26 | | Fri 27 | | Sat 28 | | Sun 29 | | Mon 30 | | Tue 31 | | Wed 1 | | Thu 2 | | Fri 3 | |
| Event | M | E | M | E | M | E | M | E | M | E | M | E | M | E | M | E | M | E |
|---|---|---|---|---|---|---|---|---|---|---|---|---|---|---|---|---|---|---|
| SM5 200m | | | | | | | | | | | | | | | | | H | F |
| SM6 200m | H | F | | | | | | | | | | | | | | | | |
| SM7 200m | | | H | F | | | | | | | | | | | | | | |
| SM8 200m | | | | | H | F | | | | | | | | | | | | |
| SM9 200m | | | | | | | | | | | | | H | F | | | | |
| SM10 200m | | | | | | | | | | | | | | | | | H | F |
| SM11 200m | | | | | | | | | H | F | | | | | | | | |
| SM13 200m | | | | | | | | | H | F | | | | | | | | |
| SM14 200m | | | | | | | | | | | H | F | | | | | | |

== Medal summary ==
The following is a summary of the medals awarded across all 200 metre individual medley events.

| Classification | Gold | | Silver | | Bronze | |
|---|---|---|---|---|---|---|
| SM5 | Lu Dong; China | 3:20.53 | Cheng Jiao; China | 3:20.80 | Monica Boggioni; Italy | 3:39.50 |
| SM6 | Maisie Summers-Newton; Great Britain | 2:56.68 WR | Yelyzaveta Mereshko; Ukraine | 2:58.04 | Verena Schott; Germany | 2:59.09 |
| SM7 | Mallory Weggemann; United States | 2:55.48 | Ahalya Lettenberger; United States | 3:02.82 | Tiffany Thomas-Kane; Australia | 3:03.11 |
| SM8 | Jessica Long; United States | 2:41.49 | Xenia Palazzo; Italy | 2:47.86 | Mariia Pavlova; RPC | 2:48.63 |
| SM9 | Sophie Pascoe; Australia | 2:32.73 | Zsófia Konkoly; Hungary | 2:33.00 | Núria Marquès; Spain | 2:35.64 |
| SM10 | Chantalle Zijderveld; Netherlands | 2:24.85 WR | Bianka Pap; Hungary | 2:26.12 | Lisa Kruger; Netherlands | 2:27.86 |
| SM11 | Ma Jia; China | 2:42.14 WR | Cai Liwen; China | 2:42.91 | Anastasia Pagonis; United States | 2:45.61 |
| SM13 | Carlotta Gilli; Italy | 2:21.44 | Colleen Young; United States | 2:26.80 | Shokhsanamkhon Toshpulatova; Uzbekistan | 2:27.92 |
| SM14 | Valeriia Shabalina; RPC | 2:20.99 | Bethany Firth; Great Britain | 2:23:19 | Louise Fiddes; Great Britain | 2:29.21 |

== Results ==
The following were the results of the finals only of each of the Women's 200 metre individual medley events in each of the classifications. Further details of each event, including where appropriate heats and semi finals results, are available on that event's dedicated page.

=== SM5 ===
The SM5 category is for swimmers who have hemiplegia, paraplegia, or short stature.

The final in this classification took place on 3 September 2021:

| Rank | Lane | Name | Nationality | Time | Notes |
|---|---|---|---|---|---|
| 1st place, gold medalist(s) | 1 | Lu Dong | China | 3:20.53 | |
| 2nd place, silver medalist(s) | 4 | Cheng Jiao | China | 3:20.80 | |
| 3rd place, bronze medalist(s) | 5 | Monica Boggioni | Italy | 3:39.50 | |
| 4 | 3 | Giulia Ghiretti | Italy | 3:40.88 | |
| 5 | 6 | Natalia Shavel | Belarus | 3:44.30 | |
| 6 | 2 | Maori Yui | Japan | 3:46.95 | |
| 7 | 7 | Esthefany Rodrigues | Brazil | 3:47.92 | |

=== SM6 ===
The SM6 category is for swimmers who have short stature, arm amputations, or some form of coordination problem on one side of their body.

The final in this classification took place on 26 August 2021:

| Rank | Lane | Name | Nationality | Time | Notes |
|---|---|---|---|---|---|
| 1st place, gold medalist(s) | 3 | Maisie Summers-Newton | Great Britain | 2:56.68 | WR |
| 2nd place, silver medalist(s) | 4 | Yelyzaveta Mereshko | Ukraine | 2:58.04 | |
| 3rd place, bronze medalist(s) | 6 | Verena Schott | Germany | 2:59.09 | |
| 4 | 5 | Elizabeth Marks | United States | 3:02.43 | |
| 5 | 7 | Eleanor Simmonds | Great Britain | 3:04.37 | |
| 6 | 2 | Grace Harvey | Great Britain | 3:05.58 | |
| 7 | 8 | Sophia Herzog | United States | 3:07.98 | |
| 8 | 1 | Liu Daomin | China | 3:10.61 | |

=== SM7 ===
The SM7 category is for swimmers who have one leg and one arm amputation on opposite side, or paralysis on one side of their body. These swimmers have full control of their arms and trunk but variable function in their legs.

The final in this classification took place on 27 August 2021:

| Rank | Lane | Name | Nationality | Time | Notes |
|---|---|---|---|---|---|
| 1st place, gold medalist(s) | 4 | Mallory Weggemann | United States | 2:55.48 | |
| 2nd place, silver medalist(s) | 5 | Ahalya Lettenberger | United States | 3:02.82 | |
| 3rd place, bronze medalist(s) | 2 | Tiffany Thomas Kane | Australia | 3:03.11 | |
| 4 | 6 | Danielle Dorris | Canada | 3:03.16 | |
| 5 | 3 | Camille Bérubé | Canada | 3:03.91 | |
| 6 | 7 | Isabella Vincent | Australia | 3:13.46 | |
| 7 | 8 | Gisell Natalia Prada Pachón | Colombia | 3:29.27 | |
| | 1 | Naomi Somellera Mandujano | Mexico | DSQ | |

=== SM8 ===
The SM8 category is for swimmers who have a single amputation, or restrictive movement in their hip, knee and ankle joints.

The final in this classification took place on 28 August 2021:

| Rank | Lane | Name | Nationality | Time | Notes |
|---|---|---|---|---|---|
| 1st place, gold medalist(s) | 4 | Jessica Long | United States | 2:41.49 | |
| 2nd place, silver medalist(s) | 3 | Xenia Palazzo | Italy | 2:47.86 | |
| 3rd place, bronze medalist(s) | 5 | Mariia Pavlova | RPC | 2:48.63 | |
| 4 | 6 | Laura Carolina González Rodríguez | Colombia | 3:03.46 | |
| 5 | 1 | Haven Shepherd | United States | 3:03.59 | |
| 6 | 2 | Mira Jeanne Maack | Germany | 3:04.78 | |
| 7 | 8 | Amalie Vinther | Denmark | 3:11.29 | |
| 8 | 7 | Vendula Dušková | Czech Republic | 3:14.59 | |

=== SM9 ===
The SM9 category is for swimmers who have joint restrictions in one leg, or double below-the-knee amputations.

The final in this classification took place on 1 September 2021:

| Rank | Lane | Name | Nationality | Time | Notes |
|---|---|---|---|---|---|
| 1st place, gold medalist(s) | 4 | Sophie Pascoe | New Zealand | 2:32.73 | |
| 2nd place, silver medalist(s) | 5 | Zsofia Konkoly | Hungary | 2:33.00 | |
| 3rd place, bronze medalist(s) | 3 | Núria Marquès Soto | Spain | 2:35.64 | |
| 4 | 8 | Sarai Gascón Moreno | Spain | 2:37.62 | |
| 5 | 1 | Ellen Keane | Ireland | 2:38.64 | |
| 6 | 2 | Summer Schmit | United States | 2:38.64 | |
| 7 | 6 | Xu Jialing | China | 2:38.90 | |
| 8 | 7 | Daniela Giménez | Argentina | 2:39.60 | |

=== SM10 ===
The SM10 category is for swimmers who have minor physical impairments, for example, loss of one hand.

The final in this classification took place on 3 September 2021:

| Rank | Lane | Name | Nationality | Time | Notes |
|---|---|---|---|---|---|
| 1st place, gold medalist(s) | 4 | Chantalle Zijderveld | Netherlands | 2:24.85 | WR |
| 2nd place, silver medalist(s) | 6 | Bianka Pap | Hungary | 2:26.12 | |
| 3rd place, bronze medalist(s) | 5 | Lisa Kruger | Netherlands | 2:27.86 | |
| 4 | 2 | Aurélie Rivard | Canada | 2:28.73 | AM |
| 5 | 3 | Jasmine Greenwood | Australia | 2:31.06 | |
| 6 | 1 | Zhang Meng | China | 2:35.26 | |
| 7 | 7 | Mikaela Jenkins | United States | 2:36.34 | |
| 8 | 8 | Keira Stephens | Australia | 2:37.76 | |

=== SM11 ===
The SM11 category is for swimmers who have severe visual impairments and have very low or no light perception, such as blindness, they are required to wear blackened goggles to compete. They use tappers when competing in swimming events.

The final in this classification took place on 30 August 2021:

| Rank | Lane | Name | Nationality | Time | Notes |
|---|---|---|---|---|---|
| 1st place, gold medalist(s) | 4 | Ma Jia | China | 2:42.14 | WR |
| 2nd place, silver medalist(s) | 3 | Cai Liwen | China | 2:42.91 | |
| 3rd place, bronze medalist(s) | 5 | Anastasia Pagonis | United States | 2:45.61 | AM |
| 4 | 2 | Wang Xinyi | China | 2:45.74 | |
| 5 | 6 | Liesette Bruinsma | Netherlands | 2:50.78 | |
| 6 | 7 | Anastasiia Shevchenko | RPC | 3:00.13 | |
| 7 | 1 | Maryna Piddubna | Ukraine | 3:01.53 | |
| 8 | 8 | Martina Rabbolini | Italy | 3:03.07 | |

=== SM13 ===
The SM13 category is for swimmers who have minor visual impairment and have high visual acuity. They are required to wear blackened goggles to compete. They may wish to use a tapper.

The final in this classification took place on 30 August 2021:

| Rank | Lane | Name | Nationality | Time | Notes |
|---|---|---|---|---|---|
| 1st place, gold medalist(s) | 4 | Carlotta Gilli | Italy | 2:21.44 | WR |
| 2nd place, silver medalist(s) | 5 | Colleen Young | United States | 2:26.80 | |
| 3rd place, bronze medalist(s) | 3 | Shokhsanamkhon Toshpulatova | Uzbekistan | 2:27.92 | |
| 4 | 7 | Daria Lukianenko | RPC | 2:30.22 | |
| 5 | 6 | Anna Stetsenko | Ukraine | 2:30.69 | |
| 6 | 2 | Róisín Ní Riain | Ireland | 2:34.12 | |
| 7 | 1 | Marlene Endrolath | Germany | 2:36.55 | |
| 8 | 8 | Anastasiya Zudzilava | Belarus | 2:42.13 | |

=== SM14 ===
The SM14 category is for swimmers who have an intellectual impairment.

The final in this classification took place on 31 August 2021:

| Rank | Lane | Name | Nationality | Time | Notes |
|---|---|---|---|---|---|
| 1st place, gold medalist(s) | 4 | Valeriia Shabalina | RPC | 2:20.99 | |
| 2nd place, silver medalist(s) | 5 | Bethany Firth | Great Britain | 2:23.19 | |
| 3rd place, bronze medalist(s) | 2 | Louise Fiddes | Great Britain | 2:29.21 | |
| 4 | 3 | Jessica-Jane Applegate | Great Britain | 2:30.43 | |
| 5 | 7 | Pernilla Lindberg | Sweden | 2:32.01 | |
| 6 | 6 | Paige Leonhardt | Australia | 2:32.69 | |
| 7 | 8 | Ruby Storm | Australia | 2:36.58 | |
| 8 | 1 | Mami Inoue | Japan | 2:37.86 | |
