= Swimming at the 2020 Summer Paralympics – Women's 400 metre freestyle =

The Women's 400 metre freestyle swimming events for the 2020 Summer Paralympics took place at the Tokyo Aquatics Centre from 25 August to 2 September 2021. A total of seven events were contested over this distance.

== Schedule ==
H	Heats	½	Semifinals	F	Final

Date	Wed 25		Thu 26		Fri 27		Sat 28		Sun 29		Mon 30		Tue 31		Wed 1		Thu 2	
Event	M	E	M	E	M	E	M	E	M	E	M	E	M	E	M	E	M	E
S6 400m																	H	F
S7 400m									H	F								
S8 400m													H	F				
S9 400m	H	F																
S10 400m															H	F		
S11 400m			H	F														
S13 400m					H	F												

== Medal summary ==
The following is a summary of the medals awarded across all 400 metre freestyle events.

Classification	Gold		Silver		Bronze	
S6	Jiang Yuyan; China	5:04.57 WR	Yelyzaveta Mereshko; Ukraine	5:12.61	Nora Meister; Switzerland	5:19.67
S7	McKenzie Coan; United States	5:05.84	Giulia Terzi; Italy	5:06.32	Julia Gaffney; United States	5:11.89
S8	Morgan Stickney; United States	4:42.39	Jessica Long; United States	4:43.41	Xenia Palazzo; Italy	4:56.79
S9	Lakeisha Patterson; Australia	4:36.68	Zsófia Konkoly; Hungary	4:36.76	Toni Shaw; Great Britain	4:39.32
S10	Aurélie Rivard; Canada	4:24.08 WR	Bianka Pap; Hungary	4:29.83	Oliwia Jabłońska; Poland	4:33.20
S11	Anastasia Pagonis; United States	4:54.49 WR	Liesette Bruinsma; Netherlands	5:05.34	Cai Liwen; China	5:07.56
S13	Anna Stetsenko; Ukraine	4:23.92	Carlotta Gilli; Italy	4:26.14	Katja Dedekind; Australia	4:35.87

== Results ==
The following were the results of the finals only of each of the Women's 400 metre freestyle events in each of the classifications. Further details of each event, including where appropriate heats and semi finals results, are available on that event's dedicated page.

=== S6 ===
The S6 category is for swimmers who have short stature, arm amputations, or some form of coordination problem on one side of their body.

The final in this classification took place on 2 September 2021:

Rank	Lane	Name	Nationality	Time	Notes
1st place, gold medalist(s)	4	Jiang Yuyan	China	5:04.57	WR
2nd place, silver medalist(s)	3	Yelyzaveta Mereshko	Ukraine	5:12.61	
3rd place, bronze medalist(s)	5	Nora Meister	Switzerland	5:19.67	
4	2	Maisie Summers-Newton	Great Britain	5:24.42	
5	6	Eleanor Simmonds	Great Britain	5:27.99	
6	8	Song Lingling	China	5:28.88	
7	7	Grace Harvey	Great Britain	5:36.86	
8	1	Laila Suzigan	Brazil	5:38.72	

=== S7 ===
The S7 category is for swimmers who have one leg and one arm amputation on opposite side or paralysis on one side of their body. These swimmers have full control of their arms and trunk but variable function in their legs.

The final in this classification took place on 29 August 2021:

Rank	Lane	Name	Nationality	Time	Notes
1st place, gold medalist(s)	4	McKenzie Coan	United States	5:05.84	
2nd place, silver medalist(s)	5	Giulia Terzi	Italy	5:06.32	
3rd place, bronze medalist(s)	3	Julia Gaffney	United States	5:11.89	
4	6	Ahalya Lettenberger	United States	5:13.55	
5	2	Sabrina Duchesne	Canada	5:20.59	
6	1	Sakura Koike	Japan	5:34.12	
7	7	Erel Halevi	Israel	5:44.97	
8	8	Naomi Somellera Mandujano	Mexico	5:54.31	

=== S8 ===
The S8 category is for swimmers who have a single amputation, or restrictive movement in their hip, knee and ankle joints.

The final in this classification took place on 31 August 2021:

Rank	Lane	Name	Nationality	Time	Notes
1st place, gold medalist(s)	4	Morgan Stickney	United States	4:42.39	
2nd place, silver medalist(s)	5	Jessica Long	United States	4:43.41	
3rd place, bronze medalist(s)	3	Xenia Francesca Palazzo	Italy	4:56.79	
4	6	Nahia Zudaire Borrezo	Spain	5:07.67	
5	2	Mira Jeanne Maack	Germany	5:12.82	
6	8	Vendula Dušková	Czech Republic	5:20.71	
7	7	Amalie Vinther	Denmark	5:22.44	
8	1	Mariia Pavlova	RPC	6:00.36	

=== S9 ===
The S9 category is for swimmers who have joint restrictions in one leg or double below-the-knee amputations.

The final in this classification took place on 25 August 2021:

Rank	Lane	Name	Nationality	Time	Notes
1st place, gold medalist(s)	6	Lakeisha Patterson	Australia	4:36.68	
2nd place, silver medalist(s)	4	Zsofia Konkoly	Hungary	4:36.76	
3rd place, bronze medalist(s)	5	Toni Shaw	Great Britain	4:39.32	
4	3	Ellie Cole	Australia	4:43.98	
5	7	Xu Jialing	China	4:51.00	
6	2	Nuria Marqués Soto	Spain	4:52.64	
7	8	Summer Schmit	United States	4:56.92	
8	1	Natalie Sims	United States	4:58.55	

=== S10 ===
The S10 category is for swimmers who have minor physical impairments, for example, loss of one hand.

The final in this classification took place on 1 September 2021:

Rank	Lane	Name	Nationality	Time	Notes
1st place, gold medalist(s)	5	Aurelie Rivard	Canada	4:24.08	WR
2nd place, silver medalist(s)	3	Bianka Pap	Hungary	4:29.83	
3rd place, bronze medalist(s)	4	Oliwia Jabłońska	Poland	4:33.20	
4	6	Zara Mullooly	Great Britain	4:44.50	
5	7	María Barrera Zapata	Colombia	4:48.73	
6	2	Stefanny Rubi Cristino Zapata	Mexico	4:49.79	

=== S11 ===
The S11 category is for swimmers who have severe visual impairments and have very low or no light perception, such as blindness, they are required to wear blackened goggles to compete. They use tappers when competing in swimming events.

The final in this classification took place on 26 August 2021:

Rank	Lane	Name	Nationality	Time	Notes
1st place, gold medalist(s)	4	Anastasia Pagonis	United States	4:54.49	WR
2nd place, silver medalist(s)	5	Liesette Bruinsma	Netherlands	5:05.34	
3rd place, bronze medalist(s)	3	Cai Liwen	China	5:07.56	
4	2	Wang Xinyi	China	5:23.05	
5	6	Matilde Estefanía Alcázar Figueroa	Mexico	5:24.63	
6	1	McClain Hermes	United States	5:29.34	
7	7	Anastasiia Shevchenko	RPC	5:33.08	
8	8	Martina Rabbolini	Italy	5:47.25	

=== S13 ===
The S13 category is for swimmers who have minor visual impairment and have high visual acuity. They are required to wear blackened goggles to compete. They may wish to use a tapper.

The final in this classification took place on 27 August 2021:

Rank	Lane	Name	Nationality	Time	Notes
1st place, gold medalist(s)	4	Anna Stetsenko	Ukraine	4:23.92	
2nd place, silver medalist(s)	5	Carlotta Gilli	Italy	4:26.14	
3rd place, bronze medalist(s)	3	Katja Dedekind	Australia	4:35.87	OC
4	6	Shokhsanamkhon Toshpulatova	Uzbekistan	4:36.65	
5	7	Róisín Ní Riain	Ireland	4:44.09	
6	2	María Delgado Nadal	Spain	4:46.88	
7	1	Makayla Nietzel	United States	4:47.45	
8	8	Ayano Tsujiuchi	Japan	4:50.01	
