= Swimming at the 2016 Summer Paralympics – Women's 100 metre breaststroke =

The women's 100 metre breaststroke swimming events for the 2016 Summer Paralympics take place at the Rio Olympic Stadium from 8 to 16 September. A total of ten events are contested for ten different classifications.

== Competition format ==
Each event consists of two rounds: heats and final. The top eight swimmers overall in the heats progress to the final. If there are eight or fewer swimmers in an event, no heats are held and all swimmers qualify for the final.

== Results ==
=== SB4 ===
20:04 11 September 2016:

Rank	Lane	Name	Nationality	Time	Notes
1st place, gold medalist(s)	4	Sarah Louise Rung	Norway	1:44.94	
2nd place, silver medalist(s)	3	Giulia Ghiretti	Italy	1:50.58	
3rd place, bronze medalist(s)	5	Rui Si Theresa Goh	Singapore	1:55.55	
4	7	Li Zhang	China	1:58.13	
5	2	Natallia Shavel	Belarus	2:00.71	
6	6	Inbal Pezaro	Israel	2:01.02	
7	8	Chrysoula Antoniadou	Greece	2:06.24	
8	1	Cuan Yao	China	2:07.64	

=== SB5 ===
17:37 11 September 2016:

Rank	Lane	Name	Nationality	Time	Notes
1st place, gold medalist(s)	5	Yelyzaveta Mereshko	Ukraine	1:41.63	
2nd place, silver medalist(s)	4	Viktoriia Savtsova	Ukraine	1:42.14	
3rd place, bronze medalist(s)	3	Lingling Song	China	1:45.21	
4	2	Verena Schott	Germany	1:46.07	
5	6	Fanni Illes	Hungary	1:48.14	
6	1	Thi Bich Nhu Trinh	Vietnam	1:51.07	
7	7	Emanuela Romano	Italy	1:52.33	
	8	Sabine Weber-Treiber	Austria		DSQ

=== SB6 ===
17:50 15 September 2016:

Rank	Lane	Name	Nationality	Time	Notes
1st place, gold medalist(s)	4	Tiffany Thomas Kane	Australia	1:35.39	PR
2nd place, silver medalist(s)	3	Sophia Elizabeth Herzog	United States	1:36.95	
3rd place, bronze medalist(s)	5	Charlotte Henshaw	Great Britain	1:37.79	
4	2	Eleanor Simmonds	Great Britain	1:39.46	
5	6	Tanya Huebner	Australia	1:40.54	
6	7	Reilly Boyt	United States	1:44.95	
7	1	Nicole Turner	Ireland	1:46.19	
8	8	Kate Wilson	Australia	1:46.87	

=== SB7 ===
17:37 10 September 2016:

Rank	Lane	Name	Nationality	Time	Notes
1st place, gold medalist(s)	4	Elizabeth Marks	United States	1:28.13	WR
2nd place, silver medalist(s)	3	Jessica Long	United States	1:32.94	
3rd place, bronze medalist(s)	5	Lisa den Braber	Netherlands	1:34.66	
4	6	Tess Routliffe	Canada	1:35.09	
5	2	Mallory Weggemann	United States	1:36.06	
6	7	Oksana Khrul	Ukraine	1:38.23	
7	1	Verônica Almeida	Brazil	1:42.41	
8	8	Vendula Duskova	Czech Republic	1:45.29	

=== SB8 ===
17:36 14 September 2016:

Rank	Lane	Name	Nationality	Time	Notes
1st place, gold medalist(s)	4	Katarina Roxon	Canada	1:19.44	
2nd place, silver medalist(s)	6	Claire Cashmore	Great Britain	1:20.60	
3rd place, bronze medalist(s)	5	Ellen Keane	Ireland	1:23.07	
4	3	Paulina Wozniak	Poland	1:25.04	
5	2	Joana Calado	Portugal	1:25.96	
6	7	Jialing Xu	China	1:30.47	
7	1	Nikita Howarth	New Zealand	1:31.11	
8	8	Camila Haase Quiros	Costa Rica	1:41.17	

=== SB9 ===
18:12 8 September 2016:

Rank	Lane	Name	Nationality	Time	Notes
1st place, gold medalist(s)	4	Lisa Kruger	Netherlands	1:15.49	
2nd place, silver medalist(s)	1	Harriet Lee	Great Britain	1:16.87	
3rd place, bronze medalist(s)	5	Chantalle Zijderveld	Netherlands	1:17.01	
4	3	Madeleine Scott	Australia	1:17.93	
5	6	Meng Zhang	China	1:19.46	
6	7	Paige Leonhardt	Australia	1:20.44	
7	2	Daniela Gimenez	Argentina	1:20.90	
8	8	Aliaksandra Svadkouskaya	Belarus	1:25.74	

=== SB11 ===
18:52 13 September 2016:

Rank	Lane	Name	Nationality	Time	Notes
1st place, gold medalist(s)	3	Xiaotong Zhang	China	1:23.02	WR
2nd place, silver medalist(s)	4	Liesette Bruinsma	Netherlands	1:25.81	
3rd place, bronze medalist(s)	5	Maja Reichard	Sweden	1:26.60	
4	6	Yana Berezhna	Ukraine	1:28.04	
5	2	Nadia Baez	Argentina	1:35.51	
6	7	Letticia Martinez	United States	1:38.22	
7	1	Martina Rabbolini	Italy	1:38.81	

=== SB13 ===
18:08 11 September 2016:

Rank	Lane	Name	Nationality	Time	Notes
1st place, gold medalist(s)	1	Fotimakhon Amilova	Uzbekistan	1:12.45	WR
2nd place, silver medalist(s)	4	Rebecca Redfern	Great Britain	1:13.81	
3rd place, bronze medalist(s)	3	Colleen Young	United States	1:17.02	
4	7	Karolina Pelendritou	Cyprus	1:17.22	
5	5	Elena Krawzow	Germany	1:17.46	
6	2	Prue Watt	Australia	1:18.16	
7	6	Anastasiya Zudzilava	Belarus	1:19.79	
8	8	Martha Ruether	United States	1:20.48	

=== SB14 ===
18:13 14 September 2016:

Rank	Lane	Name	Nationality	Time	Notes
1st place, gold medalist(s)	4	Michelle Alonso Morales	Spain	1:12.62	PR
2nd place, silver medalist(s)	3	Bethany Firth	Great Britain	1:12.89	
3rd place, bronze medalist(s)	5	Magda Toeters	Netherlands	1:17.35	
4	6	Marlou van der Kulk	Netherlands	1:20.15	
5	2	Beatriz Carneiro	Brazil	1:21.66	
6	7	Michelle Franssen	Belgium	1:22.73	
7	1	Pernilla Lindberg	Sweden	1:23.42	
8	8	Syuci Indriani	Indonesia	1:24.24	
