= Swimming at the 2016 Summer Paralympics – Women's 100 metre backstroke =

The women's 100 m backstroke swimming events for the 2016 Summer Paralympics take place at the Rio Olympic Stadium from 8 to 17 September. A total of ten events are contested for ten different classifications.

== Competition format ==
Each event consists of two rounds: heats and final. The top eight swimmers overall in the heats progress to the final. If there are less than eight swimmers in an event, no heats are held and all swimmers qualify for the final.

== Results ==
=== S2 ===
The S2 event took place on 9 September.

Rank	Lane	Name	Nationality	Time	Notes
1st place, gold medalist(s)	4	Yip Pin Xiu	Singapore	2:07.09	WR
2nd place, silver medalist(s)	3	Feng Yazhu	China	2:18.98	
3rd place, bronze medalist(s)	5	Iryna Sotska	Ukraine	2:21.98	
4	6	Zsanett Adami	Hungary	3:00.71	
5	2	Maria Kalpakidou	Greece	3:00.72	
6	7	Gloria Boccanera	Italy	3:18.38	

=== S6 ===
The S6 event took place on 8 September.

Rank	Lane	Name	Nationality	Time	Notes
1st place, gold medalist(s)	4	Song Lingling	China	1:21.43	WR
2nd place, silver medalist(s)	5	Lu Dong	China	1:21.65	
3rd place, bronze medalist(s)	2	Oksana Khrul	Ukraine	1:26.82	
4	3	Yelyzaveta Mereshko	Ukraine	1:28.99	
5	7	Emanuela Romano	Italy	1:32.45	
6	1	Vianney Trejo Delgadillo	Mexico	1:33.56	AM
7	8	Natalya Zvyagintseva	Kazakhstan	1:34.59	
–	6	Tiffany Thomas Kane	Australia	DSQ	

=== S7 ===
The S7 event took place on 8 September.

Rank	Lane	Name	Nationality	Time	Notes
1st place, gold medalist(s)	4	Ke Liting	China	1:23.06	
2nd place, silver medalist(s)	6	Zhang Ying	China	1:23.34	
3rd place, bronze medalist(s)	5	Rebecca Dubber	New Zealand	1:23.85	
4	2	Huang Yajing	China	1:24.53	
5	7	McKenzie Coan	United States	1:25.17	
6	3	Nikita Howarth	New Zealand	1:25.37	
7	1	Cortney Jordan	United States	1:25.95	
8	8	Denise Grahl	Germany	1:29.87	

=== S8 ===
The S8 event took place on 13 September.

Rank	Lane	Name	Nationality	Time	Notes
1st place, gold medalist(s)	4	Stephanie Millward	Great Britain	1:13.02	PR
2nd place, silver medalist(s)	7	Maddison Elliott	Australia	1:17.16	OC
3rd place, bronze medalist(s)	5	Jessica Long	United States	1:18.12	
4	2	Lakeisha Patterson	Australia	1:18.27	
5	6	Stephanie Slater	Great Britain	1:19.42	
6	1	Cleo Keijzer	Netherlands	1:22.09	
7	8	Lu Weiyuan	China	1:22.17	AS
8	3	Elizabeth Marks	United States	1:22.67	

=== S9 ===
The S9 event took place on 16 September.

Rank	Lane	Name	Nationality	Time	Notes
1st place, gold medalist(s)	5	Ellie Cole	Australia	1:09.18	PR
2nd place, silver medalist(s)	4	Nuria Marques Soto	Spain	1:09.57	
3rd place, bronze medalist(s)	3	Hannah Aspden	United States	1:10.67	
4	2	Wang Jiexin	China	1:13.54	
5	7	Elizabeth Smith	United States	1:14.48	
6	6	Amy Marren	Great Britain	1:14.58	
7	8	Tupou Neiufi	New Zealand	1:14.94	
8	1	Ellen Keane	Ireland	1:16.27	

=== S10 ===
The S10 event took place on 10 September.

Rank	Lane	Name	Nationality	Time	Notes
1st place, gold medalist(s)	4	Sophie Pascoe	New Zealand	1:07.04	
2nd place, silver medalist(s)	5	Bianka Pap	Hungary	1:07.95	
3rd place, bronze medalist(s)	3	Alice Tai	Great Britain	1:09.62	
4	6	Aurelie Rivard	Canada	1:09.62	
5	2	Lisa Kruger	Netherlands	1:10.59	
6	1	Mariana Ribeiro	Brazil	1:11.03	
7	7	Anaelle Roulet	France	1:12.21	
8	8	Marije Oosterhuis	Netherlands	1:13.07	

=== S11 ===
The S11 event took place on 9 September.

Rank	Lane	Name	Nationality	Time	Notes
1st place, gold medalist(s)	4	Mary Fisher	New Zealand	1:17.96	WR
2nd place, silver medalist(s)	5	Cai Liwen	China	1:20.29	
3rd place, bronze medalist(s)	1	Maja Reichard	Sweden	1:21.46	
4	3	Maryna Piddubna	Ukraine	1:21.86	
5	6	Kateryna Tkachuk	Ukraine	1:22.69	
6	7	Li Guizhi	China	1:22.97	
7	2	Cecilia Camellini	Italy	1:23.92	
8	8	Chikako Ono	Japan	1:25.40	

=== S12 ===
The S12 event took place on 14 September.

Rank	Lane	Name	Nationality	Time	Notes
1st place, gold medalist(s)	4	Hannah Russell	Great Britain	1:06.06	WR
2nd place, silver medalist(s)	5	Yaryna Matlo	Ukraine	1:11.97	
3rd place, bronze medalist(s)	3	Maria Delgardo Nadal	Spain	1:12.73	
4	6	Racquel Viel	Brazil	1:15.24	
5	7	Maryna Stavrovska	Ukraine	1:21.33	
6	2	Anna Luz Pallitero	Argentina	1:21.73	
7	1	Anabel Moro	Argentina	1:22.79	
8	8	McClain Hermes	United States	1:26.75	

=== S13 ===
The S13 event took place on 17 September.

Rank	Lane	Name	Nationality	Time	Notes
1st place, gold medalist(s)	5	Anna Stetsenko	Ukraine	1:08.30	WR
2nd place, silver medalist(s)	4	Abby Kane	Great Britain	1:09.30	
3rd place, bronze medalist(s)	6	Katja Dedekind	Australia	1:12.25	
4	3	Colleen Young	United States	1:12.93	
5	2	Karina Petricovicova	Slovakia	1:14.61	
6	7	Sanne Hoffmann	Netherlands	1:14.70	
7	1	Jenna Jones	Australia	1:15.14	
8	8	Anastasiya Zudzilva	Belarus	1:16.32	

=== S14 ===
The S14 event took place on 8 September.

Rank	Lane	Name	Nationality	Time	Notes
1st place, gold medalist(s)	4	Bethany Firth	Great Britain	1:04.05	WR
2nd place, silver medalist(s)	5	Marlou van der Kulk	Netherlands	1:06.33	
3rd place, bronze medalist(s)	3	Jessica-Jane Applegate	Great Britain	1:08.67	
4	6	Kang Jung Eun	South Korea	1:13.95	
5	2	Pernilla Lindberg	Sweden	1:15.40	
6	7	Janina Breuer	Germany	1:16.02	
7	1	Leslie Cichocki	United States	1:16.76	
8	8	Xenia Palazzo	Italy	1:17.64	
