= 2020 World Para Swimming European Open Championships – Women's 100 metre breaststroke =

The women's 100m breaststroke events at the 2020 World Para Swimming European Open Championships were held at the Penteada Olympic Pools Complex.

== Medalists ==
| Event | Gold | Silver | Bronze |
|---|---|---|---|
| SB4 | Fanni Illes; Hungary | Giulia Ghiretti; Italy | Monica Boggioni; Italy |
| SB5 | Yelyzaveta Mereshko; Ukraine | Verena Schott; Germany | Sarah Louise Rung; Norway |
| SB6 | Evelin Szaraz; Hungary | Nicole Turner; Ireland | Ida Andersson Wulf; Sweden |
| SB7 | Mariia Pavlova; Russia | Mira Jeanne Maack; Germany | Milana Shchelokova; Russia |
| SB8 | Viktoriia Ishchiulova; Russia | Nuria Marques Soto; Spain | Adelina Razetdinova; Russia |
| SB9 | Sarai Gascon; Spain | Bianka Pap; Hungary | Renata Pinto; Portugal |
| SB11 | Yana Berezhna; Ukraine | Tatiana Blattnerova; Slovakia | Martina Rabbolini; Italy |
| SB12 | Mariia Latritskaia; Russia | Karolina Pelendritou; Cyprus | Yaryna Matlo; Ukraine |
| SB13 | Elena Krawzow; Germany | Anastasiya Zudzilava; Belarus | Marlene Endrolath; Germany |
| SB14 | Michelle Alonso Morales; Spain | Janina Falk; Austria | Pernilla Lindberg; Sweden |

== Results ==
=== SB4 ===
Final

| Rank | Name | Nationality | Time | Notes |
|---|---|---|---|---|
| 1st place, gold medalist(s) | Fanni Illes | Hungary | 1:49.02 | |
| 2nd place, silver medalist(s) | Giulia Ghiretti | Italy | 1:51.34 | |
| 3rd place, bronze medalist(s) | Monica Boggioni | Italy | 1:56.39 | |
| 4 | Natallia Shavel | Belarus | 2:04.25 | |

=== SB9 ===
Final

| Rank | Name | Nationality | Time | Notes |
|---|---|---|---|---|
| 1st place, gold medalist(s) | Sarai Gascon | Spain | 1:20.63 | |
| 2nd place, silver medalist(s) | Bianka Pap | Hungary | 1:21.65 | |
| 3rd place, bronze medalist(s) | Renata Pinto | Portugal | 1:25.02 | |
| 4 | Nina Ryabova | Russia | 1:25.28 | |
| 5 | Zuzanna Boruszewska | Poland | 1:26.45 | |
| 6 | Zsofia Konkoly | Hungary | 1:27.69 | |
| 7 | Reka Tar | Hungary | 1:32.44 | |
| — | Tatyana Lebrun | Belgium | DNS | |

=== SB13 ===
Final

| Rank | Name | Nationality | Time | Notes |
|---|---|---|---|---|
| 1st place, gold medalist(s) | Elena Krawzow | Germany | 1:14.12 | |
| 2nd place, silver medalist(s) | Anastasiya Zudzilava | Belarus | 1:17.98 | |
| 3rd place, bronze medalist(s) | Marlene Endrolath | Germany | 1:20.84 | |
| 4 | Roisin Ni Riain | Ireland | 1:22.37 | |
| 5 | Evangelia Chrysoula Chioti | Greece | 1:23.85 | |
| 6 | Abby Kane | Great Britain | 1:25.19 | |
