= 2017 World Para Swimming Championships – Women's 400 metre freestyle =

The women's 400m freestyle events at the 2017 World Para Swimming Championships were held in Mexico City between 2–7 December.

== Medalists ==
Event	Gold	Silver	Bronze
S6	Song Lingling; China	Vianney Trejo Delgadillo; Mexico	Ayaallah Tewfick; Egypt
S7	McKenzie Coan; United States	Inda Andersson Wulf; Sweden	Celine Deleuze; Belgium
S8	Jessica Long; United States	Julia Gaffney; United States	Vendula Dušková; Czech Republic
S9	Nuria Marqués Soto; Spain	Xu Jialing; China	Natalie Sims; United States
S10	Oliwia Jablonska; Poland	Stefanny Rubi Cristino Zapata; Mexico	Bianka Pap; Hungary
S11	McClain Hermes; United States	Cai Liwen; China	Tatiana Blattnerová; Slovakia
S13	Rebecca Meyers; United States	Carlotta Gilli; Italy	Ariadna Edo Beltrán; Spain
