= 2019 World Para Swimming Championships – Medley relays =

Swimming competitions in London, England

The medley relay events at the 2019 World Para Swimming Championships were held in the London Aquatics Centre at the Queen Elizabeth Olympic Park in London between 9–15 September.

== Medalists ==
* - denotes the swimmer only swam in the heats only.

Event	Gold	Silver	Bronze
Men's 4x100m medley relay 34pts	Russia; Bogdan Mozgovoi; Andrei Kalina; Alexander Skaliukh; Andrei Nikolaev	Italy; Simone Barlaam; Stefano Raimondi; Federico Morlacchi; Federico Bicelli	China; Zhou Cong; Yang Guanglong; Wang Jie; Zhou Zhihua
Women's 4x100m medley relay 34pts	Great Britain; Alice Tai; Brock Whiston; Toni Shaw; Stephanie Millward	United States; Elizabeth Smith; Mikaela Jenkins; Jessica Long; McKenzie Coan	Spain; Nuria Marqués Soto; Sarai Gascon; Isabel Hernandez Santos; Teresa Perales
Mixed 4x50m medley relay 20pts	China; Wang Lichao; Song Lingling; Wang Jingang; Peng Qiuping; Ke Liting * Yao Cuan * Zou Liankang *	Italy; Antonio Fantin; Efrem Morelli; Giulia Terzi; Arjola Trimi	Ukraine; Denys Ostapchenko; Yelyzaveta Mereshko; Yaroslav Semenenko; Anna Hontar; Andrii Derevinskyi * Oksana Khrul *
