= 2017 World Para Swimming Championships – Women's 100 metre breaststroke =

The women's 100m breaststroke events at the 2017 World Para Swimming Championships were held in Mexico City between 2–7 December.

== Medalists ==
Event	Gold	Silver	Bronze
SB4	Giulia Ghiretti; Italy	Natallia Shavel; Belarus	Fanni Illés; Hungary
SB5	Song Lingling; China	Trinh Thi Bich Nhu; Vietnam	Thelma Bjorg Bjornsdottir; Iceland
SB6	Sophie Elizabeth Herzog; United States	Julia Gaffney; United States	Ida Andersson Wulf; Sweden
SB7	Jessica Long; United States	Naomi Somellera Mandujano; Mexico	Vendula Duskova; Czech Republic
SB8	Paulina Wozniak; Poland	Xu Jialing; China	Efthymia Gkouli; Greece
SB9	Daniela Giménez; Argentina	Aliaksandra Svadkouskaya; Belarus	Maria Belen Garcia; Ecuador
SB11	Zhang Xiaotong; China	Matilde Estefania Alcazar Figueroa; Mexico	McClain Hermes; United States
SB12	Karolina Pelendritou; Cyprus	Anastasiya Zudzilava; Belarus	Anabel Moro; Argentina
SB13	Colleen Young; United States	Marian Polo Lopez; Spain	Rebecca Meyers; United States
SB14	Michelle Alonso Morales; Spain	Beatriz Carneiro; Brazil	Pernilla Lindberg; Sweden
