= 2017 World Para Swimming Championships – Women's 100 metre backstroke =

The women's 100m backstroke events at the 2017 World Para Swimming Championships were held in Mexico City between 2–7 December.

== Medalists ==
Event	Gold	Silver	Bronze
S6	Song Lingling; China	Vianney Trejo Delgadillo; Mexico	Sophia Elizabeth Herzog; United States
S7	Ke Liting; China	Denise Grahl; Germany	Brenda Tilk; Estonia
S8	Jessica Long; United States	Julia Gaffney; United States	Valentina Muñoz; Chile
S9	Nuria Marqués Soto; Spain	Hannah Aspden; United States	Zsofia Konkoly; Hungary
S10	Bianka Pap; Hungary	Anaëlle Roulet; France	Emeline Pierre; France
S11	Cai Liwen; China	McClain Hermes; United States	Matilde Alcázar; Mexico
S12	Aspen Shelton; United States	Anastasiya Zudzilava; Belarus	Raquel Viel; Brazil
S13	Carlotta Gilli; Italy	Gia Pergolini; United States	Colleen Young; United States
S14	Janina Breuer; Germany	Kang Jungeun; South Korea	Pernilla Lindberg; Sweden
