= 2017 World Para Swimming Championships – Women's 100 metre freestyle =

The women's 100m freestyle events at the 2017 World Para Swimming Championships were held in Mexico City between 2–7 December.

== Medalists ==
Event	Gold	Silver	Bronze
S3	Peng Qiuping; China	Zulfiya Gabidullina; Kazakhstan	Alexandra Stamatopoulou; Greece
S4	Monica Boggioni; Italy	Patricia Pereira dos Santos; Brazil	Sonja Sigurdardottir; Iceland
S5	Sarah Louise Rung; Norway	Teresa Perales; Spain	Inbal Pezaro; Israel
S6	Vianney Trejo Delgadillo; Mexico	Ayaallah Tewfick; Egypt	Sophia Elizabeth Herzog; United States
S7	McKenzie Coan; United States	Denise Grahl; Germany	Ke Liting; China
S8	Jessica Long; United States	Cecilia Jeronimo de Araujo; Brazil	Julia Gaffney; United States
S9	Sarai Gascon; Spain	Nuria Marqués Soto; Spain	Natalie Sims; United States
S10	Alessia Scortechini; Italy	Chen Yi; China	Bianka Pap; Hungary
S11	Matilde Alcázar; Mexico	McClain Hermes; United States	Tatiana Blattnerová; Slovakia
S12	Naomi Maike Schnittger; Germany	Aspen Shelton; United States	Maria Delgado Nadal; Spain
S13	Carlotta Gilli; Italy	Rebecca Meyers; United States	Ariadna Edo Beltrán; Spain
