= 2023 World Para Swimming Championships – Women's 400 metre freestyle =

The women's 400m freestyle events at the 2023 World Para Swimming Championships will be held at the Manchester Aquatics Centre between 31 July and 6 August.

== Medalists ==
Event	Gold	Silver	Bronze
S6	Jiang Yuyan; China	Maisie Summers-Newton; Great Britain	Nora Meister; Switzerland
S7	Morgan Stickney; United States	Ahalya Lettenberger; United States	Sabrina Duchesne; Canada
S8	Xenia Palazzo; Italy	Nahia Zudaire; Spain	Cecilia Jeronimo de Araujo; Brazil
S9	Lakeisha Patterson; Australia	Emma Mecic; Croatia	Toni Shaw; Great Britain
S10	Bianka Pap; Hungary	Oliwia Jablonska; Poland	Faye Rogers; Great Britain
S11	Liesette Bruinsma; Netherlands	Cai Liwen; China	McClain Hermes; United States
S13	Carlotta Gilli; Italy	Olivia Chambers; United States	Anna Stetsenko; Ukraine

== Results ==
=== S7 ===
Five swimmers entered this event. A straight final was held on the evening of 1 August.

Entering the event, the applicable records were the following

Record	Swimmer	Time
World record	Jacqueline Freney (AUS)	4:59.02
Championship record	Mallory Weggemann (USA)	5:04.87

Final

Rank	Name	Nation	Result	Notes
1st place, gold medalist(s)	Morgan Stickney	United States	4:54.28	WR CR
2nd place, silver medalist(s)	Ahalya Lettenberger	United States	5:22.27	
3rd place, bronze medalist(s)	Sabrina Duchesne	Canada	5:31.17	
4	Agnes Kramer	Sweden	6:03.69	
5	Nicola St Clair Maitland	Sweden	6:17.26	

=== S8 ===
11 swimmers entered the event. Heats and final were both held in Monday 31 July.

Entering the event, the applicable records were the following

Record	Swimmer	Time
World record	Lakeisha Patterson (AUS)	4:40.33
Championship record	Jessica Long (USA)	4:43.76

Heats

Rank	Heat	Lane	Name	Nation	Result	Notes
1	2	4	Nahia Zudaire	Spain	5:10.90	Q
2	1	5	Ella Jones	Australia	5:12.55	Q
3	2	6	Vendula Duskova	Czech Republic	5:16.48	Q
4	2	5	Cecilia Jeronimo de Araujo	Brazil	5:16.59	Q
5	1	4	Xenia Palazzo	Italy	5:19.68	Q
6	2	3	Paola Ruvalcaba	Mexico	5:24.81	Q
7	1	3	Abi Tripp	Canada	5:29.80	Q
8	1	6	Paula Novina	Croatia	5:31.12	Q
9	1	2	Hui Zhu	China	5:33.49	
10	2	2	Ana Castro	Portugal	5:47.08	
11	2	7	Alexandra Borska	Czech Republic	5:53.14	

Final

Rank	Lane	Name	Nation	Result	Notes
1st place, gold medalist(s)	2	Xenia Palazzo	Italy	5:01.46	
2nd place, silver medalist(s)	4	Nahia Zudaire	Spain	5:05.91	
3rd place, bronze medalist(s)	6	Cecilia Jeronimo de Araujo	Brazil	5:08.94	
4	5	Ella Jones	Australia	5:12.76	
5	3	Vendula Duskova	Czech Republic	5:16.54	
6	7	Paola Ruvalcaba	Mexico	5:18.88	
8	8	Paula Novina	Croatia	5:25.98	
7	1	Abi Tripp	Canada	5.29.99	

=== S10 ===
14 swimmers entered the event. Heats and final were both held in 2 August.

Entering the event, the applicable records were the following

Record	Swimmer	Time
World record	Aurelie Rivard (CAN)	4:24.08
Championship record	Oliwia Jablonska (POL)	4:29.65

Heats

Rank	Heat	Lane	Athlete	Nation	Result	Notes
1	2	5	Aurelie Rivard	Canada	4:39.77	Q
2	2	4	Bianka Pap	Hungary	4:41.32	Q
3	1	4	Oliwia Jablonska	Poland	4:44.58	Q
4	1	5	Faye Rogers	Great Britain	4:46.77	Q
5	2	3	Anaelle Roulet	France	4:48.11	Q
6	2	6	Elodie Lorandi	France	4:48.57	Q
7	1	3	Poppy Wilson	Australia	4:54.94	Q
8	2	2	Hannah Nelson	United States	4:56.06	Q
9	1	2	Gabriella Smith	New Zealand	4:58.24	R1
10	1	6	María Barrera Zapata	Colombia	4:58.27	
11	2	7	Csenge Hotz	Hungary	5:00.42	
12	1	1	Audrey Kim	United States	5:03.10	
13	1	7	Katie Cosgriffe	Canada	5:10.01	
14	2	1	Lili-Fox Mason	New Zealand	5:19.61	

Final

Aurélie Rivard withdrew from the final and was replaced by Gabriella Smith

Rank	Athlete	Nation	Result	Notes
1st place, gold medalist(s)	Bianka Pap	Hungary	4:33.43	
2nd place, silver medalist(s)	Oliwia Jablonska	Poland	4:38.57	
3rd place, bronze medalist(s)	Faye Rogers	Great Britain	4:41.06	
4	Anaelle Roulet	France	4:45.03	
5	Elodie Lorandi	France	4:50.61	
6	Poppy Wilson	Australia	4:53.42	
7	Hannah Nelson	United States	4:54.67	
8	Gabriella Smith	New Zealand	5:01.00	
