= Swimming at the 2020 Summer Paralympics – Women's 400 metre freestyle S10 =

Women's 400 metre freestyle S10 at the XVI Paralympic Games
- Venue: Tokyo Aquatics Centre
- Dates: 1 September 2021
- Competitors: 6 from 6 nations

Medalists
1st place, gold medalist(s)		Aurélie Rivard	Canada
2nd place, silver medalist(s)		Bianka Pap	Hungary
3rd place, bronze medalist(s)		Oliwia Jabłońska	Poland

The Women's 400 metre freestyle S10 event at the 2020 Paralympic Games took place on 1 September 2021, at the Tokyo Aquatics Centre.

== Final ==
400m freestyle final
Rank	Lane	Name	Nationality	Time	Notes
1st place, gold medalist(s)	5	Aurélie Rivard	Canada	4:24.08	WR
2nd place, silver medalist(s)	3	Bianka Pap	Hungary	4:29.83	
3rd place, bronze medalist(s)	4	Oliwia Jabłońska	Poland	4:33.20	
4	6	Zara Mullooly	Great Britain	4:44.50	
5	7	María Barrera Zapata	Colombia	4:48.73	
6	2	Stefanny Rubi Cristino Zapata	Mexico	4:49.79	
