= Alexandra Stamatopoulou =

Greek Paralympic swimmer (born 1986)

Personal information
- Nationality: Greek
- Born: 7 September 1986 (age 40) Romania

Sport
- Sport: Paralympic swimming
- Disability class: S4
- Club: Tyrtaios
- Coached by: Michalis Nikopoulos
Medal record
Women's para swimming
Representing Greece
Paralympic Games
Gold medal – first place	2024 Paris	50 m backstroke S4
Bronze medal – third place	2020 Tokyo	50m backstroke S4
World Championships
Gold medal – first place	2022 Madeira	50m backstroke S4
Silver medal – second place	2017 Mexico City	50m freestyle S3
Silver medal – second place	2019 London	50m backstroke S4
Bronze medal – third place	2017 Mexico City	100m freestyle S3
Bronze medal – third place	2017 Mexico City	50m backstroke S3
European Championships
Gold medal – first place	2018 Dublin	50m backstroke S4
Silver medal – second place	2024 Funchal	50m backstroke S4
Bronze medal – third place	2016 Funchal	50m freestyle S3

Alexandra Stamatopoulou (born 7 September 1986) is a Greek Paralympic swimmer. She represented Greece at the Paralympic Games.

== Personal life ==
Stamatopoulou was born in Romania, in a very poor family, who had to send her to an institution. She lived there until she became five years old, when she was adopted and relocated to Greece. Her childhood idol was Nadia Comăneci. She has been diagnosed with the stiff-person syndrome.

== Career ==
Stamatopoulou represented Greece at the 2016 Summer Paralympics and at the 2020 Summer Paralympics. In Tokyo she won the bronze medal in the 50 metre backstroke S4 event. At the 2024 Summer Paralympics, in Paris, France, Stamatopoulou won the gold medal in the women's 50m backstroke S4 category. She had announced her retirement from competition at the end of the games.

She was awarded as the Best Greek female athlete with a disability for 2018, 2019, 2021 and 2022.
