= 2017 World Para Swimming Championships – Men's 50 metre freestyle =

The men's 50m freestyle events at the 2017 World Para Swimming Championships were held in Mexico City between 2–7 December.

== Medalists ==
Event	Gold	Silver	Bronze
S3	Huang Wenpan; China	Diego Lopez Diaz; Mexico	Vincenzo Boni; Italy
S4	Jan Povýšil; Czech Republic	Gustavo Sanchez Martinez; Mexico	Jesús Hernández Hernández; Mexico
S5	Daniel Dias; Brazil	Vo Thanh Tung; Vietnam	Sebastian Rodriguez; Spain
S6	Nelson Crispín; Colombia	Lorenzo Perez Escalona; Cuba	Oscar Andres Osorio Campaz; Colombia
S7	Carlos Serrano Zárate; Colombia	Christian Sadie; South Africa	Tobias Pollap; Germany
S8	Xu Haijiao; China	Yang Guanglong; China	Luis Armando Andrade Guillen; Mexico
S9	Simone Barlaam; Italy	Jose Antonio Mari Alcaraz; Spain	Leo Lähteenmäki; Finland
S10	Phelipe Andrews Melo Rodrigues; Brazil	Andre Brasil; Brazil	David Levecq; Spain
S11	Edgaras Matakas; Lithuania	Hryhory Zudzilau; Belarus	Wojciech Makowski; Poland
S12	Tucker Dupree; United States	Charalampos Taiganidis; Greece	Thomaz Rocha Matera; Brazil
S13	Ihar Boki; Belarus	Kamil Rzetelski; Poland	Ivan Salguero Oteiza; Spain
