= 2017 World Para Swimming Championships – Women's 50 metre freestyle =

The women's 50m freestyle events at the 2017 World Para Swimming Championships were held in Mexico City between 2–7 December.

== Medalists ==
Event	Gold	Silver	Bronze
S3	Zulfiya Gabidullina; Kazakhstan	Alexandra Stamatopoulou; Greece	Patricia Valle; Mexico
S4	Monica Boggioni; Italy	Nely Miranda Herrera; Mexico	Cheng Jiao; China
S5	Teresa Perales; Spain	Joana Maria Silva; Brazil	Inbal Pezaro; Israel
S6	Sabine Weber-Treiber; Austria	Trinh Thi Bich Nhu; Vietnam	Vianney Trejo Delgadillo; Mexico
S7	McKenzie Coan; United States	Denise Grahl; Germany	Ke Liting; China
S8	Cecilia Jeronimo de Araujo; Brazil	Julia Gaffney; United States	Ann Wacuka; Kenya
S9	Sarai Gascon; Spain	Nuria Marqués Soto; Spain	Natalie Sims; United States
S10	Chen Yi; China	Alessia Scortechini; Italy	Susannah Kaul; Estonia
S11	Cai Liwen; China	Tatiana Blattnerová; Slovakia	McClain Hermes; United States
S12	Naomi Maike Schnittger; Germany	Maria Delgado Nadal; Spain	Aspen Shelton; United States
S13	Carlotta Gilli; Italy	Joanna Mendak; Poland	Marian Polo Lopez; Spain
