= Swimming at the 2016 Summer Paralympics – Women's 400 metre freestyle S7 =

Women's 400 metre freestyle S7 at the XV Paralympic Games
- Venue: Olympic Aquatics Stadium
- Dates: 14 September 2016
- Competitors: 8 from 7 nations

Medalists
| 1st place, gold medalist(s) | | McKenzie Coan | United States |
| 2nd place, silver medalist(s) | | Cortney Jordan | United States |
| 3rd place, bronze medalist(s) | | Susannah Rodgers | Great Britain |

The women's 400 metre freestyle S7 event at the 2016 Paralympic Games took place on 14 September 2016, at the Olympic Aquatics Stadium. No heats were held.

== Final ==
17:54 14 September 2016:

| Rank | Lane | Name | Nationality | Time | Notes |
|---|---|---|---|---|---|
| 1st place, gold medalist(s) | 4 | McKenzie Coan | United States | 5:05.77 | |
| 2nd place, silver medalist(s) | 5 | Cortney Jordan | United States | 5:18.20 | |
| 3rd place, bronze medalist(s) | 6 | Susannah Rodgers | Great Britain | 5:23.17 | |
| 4 | 3 | Rebecca Dubber | New Zealand | 5:31.53 | |
| 5 | 7 | Verena Schott | Germany | 5:41.47 | |
| 6 | 2 | Yajing Huang | China | 5:44.72 | |
| 7 | 1 | Arianna Talamona | Italy | 5:48.37 | |
| 8 | 8 | Erel Halevi | Israel | 5:51.05 | |
