= 2018 World Para Swimming European Championships – Women's 50 metres backstroke =

The women's 50 metres backstroke at the 2018 World Para Swimming European Championships was held at the National Aquatic Centre in Dublin from 13 to 19 August. 2 classification finals are held in all over this event.

== Medalists ==
Event	Gold		Silver		Bronze	
S4	Alexandra Stamatopoulou (GRE)	53.59	Maryna Verbova (UKR)	53.83	Olga Sviderska (UKR)	56.37
S5	Sumeyye Boyaci (TUR)	45.21	Teresa Perales (ESP)	45.68	Monica Boggioni (ITA)	46.54
WR world record | AR area record | CR championship record | GR games record | NR national record | OR Olympic record | PB personal best | SB season best | WL world leading (in a given season)

== See also ==
- List of IPC world records in swimming
