= Arnošt Petráček =

Czech Paralympic swimmer

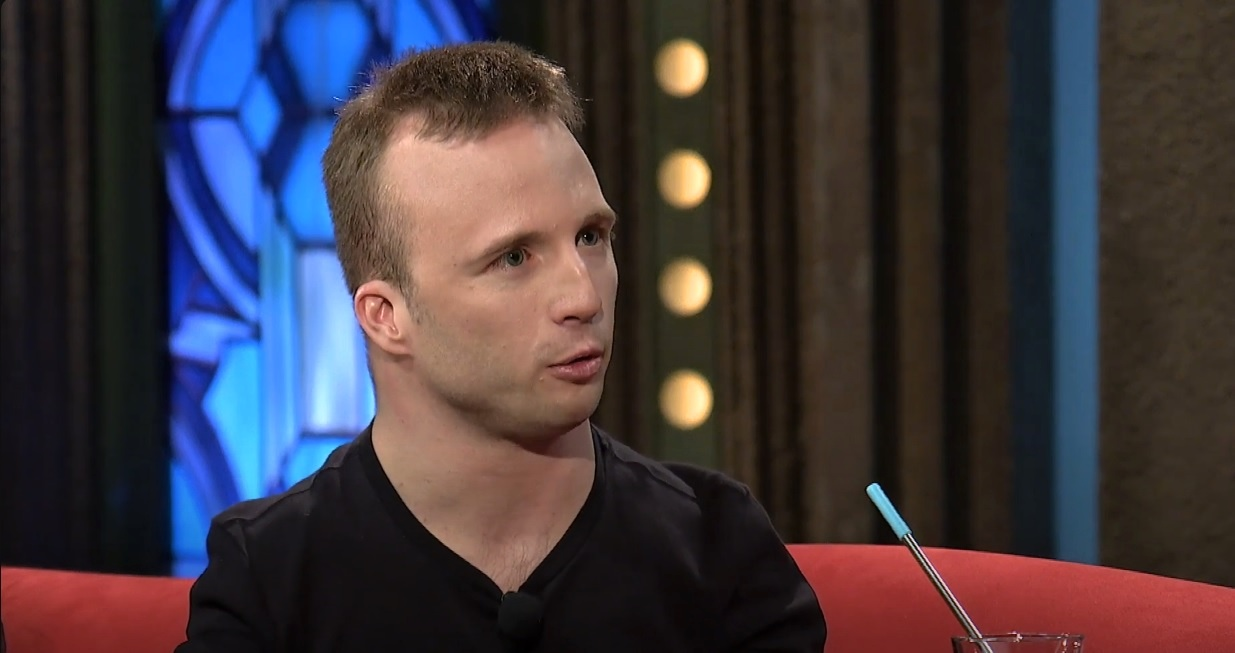

Personal information
- Nickname: Arny
- Born: 25 July 1991 (age 34) Písek, Czechoslovakia
- Home town: Lipno nad Vltavou, Czech Republic
- Height: 1.48 m (4 ft 10 in)

Sport
- Country: Czech Republic
- Sport: Paralympic swimming
- Disability: Phocomelia in upper limbs and luxation of knee joints
- Disability class: S4
- Club: Para Plavani Praha
Medal record
Paralympic swimming
Representing Czech Republic
Paralympic Games
Gold medal – first place	2016 Rio de Janeiro	50m backstroke S4
Silver medal – second place	2020 Tokyo	50m backstroke S4
Bronze medal – third place	2024 Paris	50 m backstroke S4
World Championships (LC)
Gold medal – first place	2010 Eindhoven	50m butterfly S4
Gold medal – first place	2017 Mexico City	50m backstroke S4
Gold medal – first place	2022 Madeira	50m backstroke S4
Silver medal – second place	2006 Durban	50m butterfly S4
Silver medal – second place	2010 Eindhoven	50m backstroke S4
Silver medal – second place	2013 Montreal	50m backstroke S4
Silver medal – second place	2013 Montreal	50m butterfly S4
Silver medal – second place	2019 London	50m backstroke S4
Bronze medal – third place	2023 Manchester	50m backstroke S4
Bronze medal – third place	2025 Singapore	50m backstroke S4
World Championships (SC)
Silver medal – second place	2009 Rio de Janeiro	50m backstroke S4
European Championships
Gold medal – first place	2014 Eindhoven	50m backstroke S4
Gold medal – first place	2018 Dublin	50m freestyle S4
Gold medal – first place	2018 Dublin	50m backstroke S4
Silver medal – second place	2014 Eindhoven	50m freestyle S4
Silver medal – second place	2016 Funchal	50m backstroke S4

Arnošt Petráček (born 25 July 1991) is a Czech Paralympic swimmer who competes in international level events. He specialises in backstroke swimming where he has won one Paralympic title in 2016, one World title including three silvers and two European titles.

== Career ==
In 2016, Petráček's portrait was minted onto Czech coins and was awarded these in Jablonec nad Nisou because of his success at the 2016 Summer Paralympics along with Lukáš Krpálek who won an Olympic gold in judo at the 2016 Summer Olympics. He was awarded the Medal of Merit for his services in the sport by mayor Jiří Svoboda.
