= Swimming at the 2020 Summer Paralympics – Women's 200 metre individual medley SM5 =

Women's 200 metre individual medley SM5 at the XVI Paralympic Games
- Venue: Tokyo Aquatics Centre
- Dates: 3 September 2021
- Competitors: 7 from 5 nations

Medalists
| 1st place, gold medalist(s) | | Lu Dong | China |
| 2nd place, silver medalist(s) | | Cheng Jiao | China |
| 3rd place, bronze medalist(s) | | Monica Boggioni | Italy |

The Women's 200 metre individual medley SM5 event at the 2020 Paralympic Games took place on 3 September 2021, at the Tokyo Aquatics Centre.

== Final ==
| Rank | Lane | Name | Nationality | Time | Notes |
|---|---|---|---|---|---|
| 1st place, gold medalist(s) | 1 | Lu Dong | China | 3:20.53 | AS |
| 2nd place, silver medalist(s) | 4 | Cheng Jiao | China | 3:20.80 | |
| 3rd place, bronze medalist(s) | 5 | Monica Boggioni | Italy | 3:39.50 | |
| 4 | 3 | Giulia Ghiretti | Italy | 3:40.88 | |
| 5 | 6 | Natalia Shavel | Belarus | 3:44.30 | |
| 6 | 2 | Maori Yui | Japan | 3:46.95 | |
| 7 | 7 | Esthefany Rodrigues | Brazil | 3:47.92 | |
