= 2017 World Para Swimming Championships – Women's 200 metre freestyle =

The women's 200m freestyle events at the 2017 World Para Swimming Championships were held in Mexico City between 2–7 December.

== Medalists ==
Event	Gold	Silver	Bronze
S1-5	Zhang Li; China	Sarah Louise Rung; Norway	Yao Cuan; China
S14	Pernilla Lindberg; Sweden	Janina Breuer; Germany	Michelle Alonso Morales; Spain
