= 2019 World Para Swimming Championships – Women's 400 metre freestyle =

The women's 400m freestyle events at the 2019 World Para Swimming Championships were held in the London Aquatics Centre at the Queen Elizabeth Olympic Park in London between 9–15 September.

== Medalists ==
Event	Gold	Silver	Bronze
S6	Jiang Yuyan; China	Yelyzaveta Mereshko; Ukraine	Eleanor Simmonds; Great Britain
S7	McKenzie Coan; United States	Ahalya Lettenberger; United States	Nora Meister; Switzerland
S8	Alice Tai; Great Britain	Xenia Francesca Palazzo; Italy	Jessica Long; United States
S9	Lakeisha Patterson; Australia	Toni Shaw; Great Britain	Ellie Cole; Australia
S10	Oliwia Jablonska; Poland	Aurelie Rivard; Canada	Zara Mullooly; Great Britain
S11	Liesette Bruinsma; Netherlands	Zhang Xiaotong; China	Cai Liwen; China
S13	Rebecca Meyers; United States	Anna Stetsenko; Ukraine	Carlotta Gilli; Italy
