= 2019 World Para Swimming Championships – Women's 50 metre butterfly =

Women's World para swimming championship

The women's 50m butterfly events at the 2019 World Para Swimming Championships were held in the London Aquatics Centre at the Queen Elizabeth Olympic Park in London between 9–15 September.

== Medalists ==
| Event | Gold | Silver | Bronze |
|---|---|---|---|
| S5 | Arianna Talamona; Italy | Joana Maria Silva; Brazil | Sevilay Ozturk; Turkey |
| S6 | Jiang Yuyan; China | Ellie Robinson; Great Britain | Nicole Turner; Ireland |
| S7 | Mallory Weggemann; United States | Julia Gaffney; United States | Giulia Terzi; Italy |
