= Julia Gaffney =

American Paralympic swimmer

Personal information
- Full name: Julia Kay Gaffney
- Born: May 1, 2000 (age 26) Russia
- Home town: Mayflower, Arkansas, United States
- Height: 5 ft 3 in (160 cm) (with prosthetics)
- Weight: 100 lb (45 kg)

Sport
- Country: United States
- Sport: Paralympic swimming
- Disability: Proximal femoral focal deficiency Fibular hemimelia
- Disability class: S7
- Club: AquaKids Swim Team, Conway, Arkansas
- Coached by: Tony Marleneanu
Medal record
Paralympic swimming
Representing United States
Paralympic Games
Bronze medal – third place	2020 Tokyo	400 m freestyle S7
Bronze medal – third place	2020 Tokyo	100 m backstroke S7
Bronze medal – third place	2024 Paris	200 m ind. medley SM7
World Championships
Gold medal – first place	2019 London	200m medley SM7
Gold medal – first place	2022 Madeira	100 m backstroke S7
Gold medal – first place	2022 Madeira	200 m medley SM7
Silver medal – second place	2017 Mexico City	50m freestyle S8
Silver medal – second place	2017 Mexico City	400m freestyle S8
Silver medal – second place	2017 Mexico City	100m backstroke S8
Silver medal – second place	2017 Mexico City	100m breaststroke SB6
Silver medal – second place	2017 Mexico City	200m medley SM8
Silver medal – second place	2019 London	50m butterfly S7
Silver medal – second place	2023 Manchester	100m backstroke S7
Silver medal – second place	2023 Manchester	200m medley SM7
Bronze medal – third place	2017 Mexico City	100m freestyle S8
Bronze medal – third place	2023 Manchester	50m butterfly S7

Julia Kay Gaffney (born May 1, 2000) is an American Paralympic swimmer who competes in international level events. She was born with proximal femoral focal deficiency and had her right leg with amputated above the knee and her left leg amputated below the knee due to fibular hemimelia when she was born.

Gaffney was brought up in a Russian orphanage before being adopted by an American family from Arkansas when she was five years old.

== Sporting career ==
Gaffney wanted to play softball but due to her disability circumstances she found it too difficult, she was then encouraged to take swimming lessons and started competing in 2014. Her first international debut in competitive swimming was in California at the World Para Swimming World Series, she met her idol Jessica Long and Paralympic swimming coach Queenie Nichols who both inspired and influenced her to continue her swimming efforts.

At the 2017 World Para Swimming Championships in Mexico City, Gaffney won her first medals in the pool: five silver medals. In London, two years later at the 2019 World Para Swimming Championships, Gaffney became a world champion in the women's 200m individual medley SM7 where she was 0.02 seconds ahead of the defending champion Tess Routliffe and Mallory Weggemann.

On April 14, 2022, Gaffney was named to the roster to represent the United States at the 2022 World Para Swimming Championships. On April 29, 2023, Gaffney was named to the roster to represent the United States at the 2023 World Para Swimming Championships.
