= 2017 World Para Swimming Championships – Women's 50 metre backstroke =

The women's 50m backstroke events at the 2017 World Para Swimming Championships were held in Mexico City between 2–7 December.

== Medalists ==
Event	Gold	Silver	Bronze
S3	Peng Qiuping; China	Edenia Garcia; Brazil	Alexandra Stamatopoulou; Greece
S4	Cheng Jiao; China	Monica Boggioni; Italy	Deng Yue; China
S5	Natalya Zvyagintseva; Kazakhstan	Teresa Perales; Spain	Sarah Louise Rung; Norway
