= 2017 World Para Swimming Championships – Men's 200 metre freestyle =

Sporting event

The men's 200m freestyle events at the 2017 World Para Swimming Championships were held in Mexico City between 2–7 December.

== Medalists ==
Event	Gold	Silver	Bronze
S2	Liu Benying; China	Zou Liankang; China	Alberto Abarza; Chile
S3	Huang Wenpan; China	Diego Lopez Diaz; Mexico	Vincenzo Boni; Italy
S4	Gustavo Sánchez Martinez; Mexico	Jan Povýšil; Czech Republic	Jesús Hernández Hernández; Mexico
S5	Daniel Dias; Brazil	Théo Curin; France	Li Junsheng; China
S14	Cho Wonsang; South Korea	Lee Inkook; South Korea	Felipe Vila Real; Brazil
