= 2017 World Para Swimming Championships – Men's 400 metre freestyle =

The men's 400m freestyle events at the 2017 World Para Swimming Championships were held in Mexico City between 2–7 December.

== Medalists ==
| Event | Gold | Silver | Bronze |
|---|---|---|---|
| S6 | Antonio Fantin; Italy | Francesco Bocciardo; Italy | Antoni Ponce Bertran; Spain |
| S7 | Andreas Skaar Bjornstad; Norway | Facundo Jose Arregui; Argentina | Carlos Serrano Zárate; Colombia |
| S8 | Xu Haijiao; China | Robert Griswold; United States | Iñaki Basiloff; Argentina |
| S9 | Federico Morlacchi; Italy | David Grachat; Portugal | Kristijan Vincetic; Croatia |
| S10 | Andre Brasil; Brazil | Patryk Karlinski; Poland | Only two swimmers |
| S11 | Tharon Drake; United States | Hryhory Zudzilau; Belarus | Sergio Zayas; Argentina |
| S13 | Ihar Boki; Belarus | Ivan Salguero Oteiza; Spain | Thomaz Rocha Matera; Brazil |
