= Xu Haijiao =

Chinese Paralympic swimmer

Personal information
- Nationality: Chinese

Sport
- Sport: Swimming
Medal record
Representing China
Men's Paralympic swimming
Summer Paralympics
| Gold medal – first place | 2024 Paris | 200 m ind. medley SM8 |
| Silver medal – second place | 2016 Rio de Janeiro | 400 m freestyle S8 |
| Silver medal – second place | 2016 Rio de Janeiro | 100 m butterfly S8 |
| Silver medal – second place | 2020 Tokyo | 200 m ind. medley SM8 |
| Bronze medal – third place | 2016 Rio de Janeiro | 200 m medley SM8 |
| Bronze medal – third place | 2016 Rio de Janeiro | 4x100 m freestyle relay 34pts |
World Championships
| Gold medal – first place | 2017 Mexico City | 50 m freestyle S8 |
| Gold medal – first place | 2017 Mexico City | 100 m freestyle S8 |
| Gold medal – first place | 2017 Mexico City | 400 m freestyle S8 |
| Gold medal – first place | 2017 Mexico City | 100 m butterfly S8 |
| Gold medal – first place | 2017 Mexico City | 200 m ind. medley SM8 |
| Gold medal – first place | 2017 Mexico City | 4x50 m freestyle relay 20pts |
| Gold medal – first place | 2023 Manchester | 200 m ind. medley SM8 |
| Silver medal – second place | 2017 Mexico City | 100 m breaststroke SB8 |
| Silver medal – second place | 2023 Manchester | 100 m freestyle S8 |
| Bronze medal – third place | 2023 Manchester | 100 m breaststroke SB8 |
Asian Para Games
| Gold medal – first place | 2018 Jakarta | 4×100m medley relay 34pts |
| Gold medal – first place | 2018 Jakarta | 4×50 freestyle relay 20 pts |
| Gold medal – first place | 2018 Jakarta | 400 m freestyle S8 |
| Gold medal – first place | 2018 Jakarta | 100 m freestyle S8 |
| Gold medal – first place | 2018 Jakarta | 50 m freestyle S8 |
| Gold medal – first place | 2018 Jakarta | 200m ind. medley SM8 |
| Gold medal – first place | 2018 Jakarta | 100 m breaststroke SB8 |
| Gold medal – first place | 2022 Hangzhou | 400 m freestyle S8 |
| Gold medal – first place | 2022 Hangzhou | 200 m ind. medley SM8 |
| Silver medal – second place | 2018 Jakarta | 100 m butterfly S8 |

Xu Haijiao is a Chinese Paralympic swimmer who represented China at the 2016 and 2020 Summer Paralympics.

== Career ==
He competed at the 2016 Summer Paralympics and won silver medals in the 400 metre freestyle S8 and 100 metre butterfly S8 events, and bronze medals in the 200 metre individual medley SM8 and 4 × 100 metre freestyle relay 34pts events.
