= 2017 World Para Swimming Championships – Men's 100 metre backstroke =

The men's 100m backstroke events at the 2017 World Para Swimming Championships were held in Mexico City between 2–7 December.

== Medalists ==
Event	Gold	Silver	Bronze
S1	Francesco Bettella; Italy	Dimitrios Karypidis; Greece	Apostolos Tsaousis; Greece
S2	Zou Liankang; China	Liu Benying; China	Alberto Abarza; Chile
S6	Talisson Glock; Brazil	Antoni Ponce Bertran; Spain	Antonio Fantin; Italy
S7	Italo Pereira; Brazil	Matias de Andrade; Argentina	Ante Rada; Croatia
S8	Robert Griswold; United States	Pipo Carlomagno; Argentina	Mark Malyar; Israel
S9	Ugo Didier; France	Federico Morlacchi; Italy	Simone Barlaam; Italy
S10	Andre Brasil; Brazil	Kardo Ploomipuu; Estonia	Tye Dutcher; United States
S11	Wojciech Makowski; Poland	Hryhory Zudzilau; Belarus	Sergio Zayas; Argentina
S12	Charalampos Taiganidis; Greece	Tucker Dupree; United States	Thomaz Rocha Matera; Brazil
S13	Ihar Boki; Belarus	Antti Antero Latikka; Finland	Gerasimos Lignos; Greece
S14	Lawrence Sapp; United States	Robert Isak Jonsson; Iceland	Yannick Vandeput; Belgium
