= 2017 World Para Swimming Championships – Men's 50 metre backstroke =

The men's 50m backstroke events at the 2017 World Para Swimming Championships were held in Mexico City between 2–7 December.

== Medalists ==
Event	Gold	Silver	Bronze
S1	Francesco Bettella; Italy	Dimitrios Karypidis; Greece	Apostolos Tsaousis; Greece
S2	Zou Liankang; China	Liu Benying; China	Alberto Abarza; Chile
S3	Diego Lopez Diaz; Mexico	Vincenzo Boni; Italy	Huang Wenpan; China
S4	Arnost Petracek; Czech Republic	Jesús Hernández Hernández; Mexico	Gustavo Sanchez Martinez; Mexico
S5	Daniel Dias; Brazil	Vo Thanh Tung; Vietnam	Beytullah Eroglu; Turkey
