= Thomaz Rocha Matera =

Brazilian para swimmer (born 1989)

Personal information
- Born: 20 May 1989 (age 37)

Sport
- Sport: Para swimming
- Disability: Retinitis pigmentosa
- Disability class: S11
Medal record
Representing Brazil
World Championships
Gold medal – first place	2017 Mexico City	100 m freestyle S12
Gold medal – first place	2025 Singapore	Mixed 4×100 m medley relay 49pts
Silver medal – second place	2025 Singapore	100 m butterfly S11
Bronze medal – third place	2017 Mexico City	400 m freestyle S13
Bronze medal – third place	2017 Mexico City	100 m backstroke S12
Parapan American Games
Gold medal – first place	2019 Lima	50 m freestyle S12
Silver medal – second place	2019 Lima	100 m freestyle S12
Silver medal – second place	2019 Lima	100 m backstroke S12
Silver medal – second place	2019 Lima	100 m butterfly S13
Silver medal – second place	2023 Santiago	50 m freestyle S13
Bronze medal – third place	2023 Santiago	100 m freestyle S12
Bronze medal – third place	2023 Santiago	400 m freestyle S13
Bronze medal – third place	2023 Santiago	100 m butterfly S12

Thomaz Rocha Matera (born 20 May 1989) is a Brazilian para swimmer. He represented Brazil at the 2016 Summer Paralympics.

== Career ==
Matera represented Brazil at the 2016 Summer Paralympics. He then competed at the 2017 World Para Swimming Championships and won a gold medal in the 100 metre freestyle S12, and bronze medals in the 400 metre freestyle S13 and 100 metre backstroke S12 events.

In September 2025, he competed at the 2025 World Para Swimming Championships and won a silver medal in the 100 metre butterfly S11 event. He also won a gold medal in the mixed 4 × 100 metre medley relay 49 pts with a world record time of 4:23.48.

== Personal life ==
Matera was diagnosed with retinitis pigmentosa. His younger brother, Douglas, is also a Paralympic swimmer for Brazil.
