= 2017 World Para Swimming Championships – Men's 50 metre breaststroke =

The men's 50m breaststroke events at the 2017 World Para Swimming Championships were held in Mexico City between 2–7 December.

== Medalists ==
Event	Gold	Silver	Bronze
SB2	Huang Wenpan; China	Arnulfo Castorena; Mexico	Cristopher Tronco; Mexico
SB3	Efrem Morelli; Italy	Miguel Luque; Spain	Konstantinos Karaouzas; Greece
