= 2023 World Para Swimming Championships – Women's 200 metre individual medley =

The women's 200m individual medley events at the 2023 World Para Swimming Championships were held at the Manchester Aquatics Centre between 31 July and 6 August.

== Medalists ==
Event	Gold	Silver	Bronze
SM5	He Shenggao; China	Cheng Jiao; China	Lu Dong; China
SM6	Maisie Summers-Newton; Great Britain	Verena Schott; Germany	Ellie Marks; United States
SM7	Tess Routliffe; Canada	Julia Gaffney; United States	Danielle Dorris; Canada
SM8	Jessica Long; United States	Zhu Hui; China	Xenia Francesca Palazzo; Italy
SM9	Zsófia Konkoly; Hungary	Núria Marquès; Spain	Sarai Gascón Moreno; Spain
SM10	Bianka Pap; Hungary	Lisa Kruger; Netherlands	Faye Rogers; Great Britain
SM11	Ma Jia; China	Cai Liwen; China	Liesette Bruinsma; Netherlands
SM13	Carlotta Gilli; Italy	Olivia Chambers; United States	Maria Carolina Gomes Santiago; Brazil
SM14	Bethany Firth; Great Britain	Aira Kinoshita; Japan	Poppy Maskill; Great Britain

== Results ==
=== SM7 ===
Final

Seven swimmers from five nations took part.

Rank	Name	Nation	Result	Notes
1st place, gold medalist(s)	Tess Routliffe	Canada	2:57.77	
2nd place, silver medalist(s)	Julia Gaffney	United States	3:03.07	
3rd place, bronze medalist(s)	Danielle Dorris	Canada	3:05.93	
4	Ahalya Lettenberger	United States	3:06.12	
5	Naomi Somellera Mandujano	Mexico	3:10.56	
6	Leyre Orti Campos	Spain	3:26.82	
	Veronika Korzhova	Ukraine	DSQ	

=== SM11 ===
Final

Eight swimmers from six nations took part.

Rank	Name	Nation	Result	Notes
1st place, gold medalist(s)	Ma Jia	China	2:40.10	WR
2nd place, silver medalist(s)	Cai Liwen	China	2:43.23	
3rd place, bronze medalist(s)	Liesette Bruinsma	Netherlands	2:46.95	
4	Wang Xinyi	China	2:47.12	
5	Scarlett Humphrey	United Kingdom	2:55.59	
6	Matilde Alcázar	Mexico	3:05.89	
7	Chikako Ono	Japan	3:08.30	
8	Nadia Báez	Argentina	3:27.21	
