= 2017 World Para Swimming Championships – Men's 100 metre breaststroke =

The men's 100m breaststroke events at the 2017 World Para Swimming Championships were held in Mexico City between 2–7 December.

== Medalists ==
Event	Gold	Silver	Bronze
SB4	Li Junsheng; China	Moisés Fuentes; Colombia	Antonios Tsapatakis; Greece
SB5	Antoni Ponce Bertran; Spain	Karl Forsman; Sweden	Do Thanh Hai; Vietnam
SB6	Nelson Crispín; Colombia	Andreas Skaar Bjornstad; Norway	Juan Jose Gutierrez Bermudez; Mexico
SB7	Carlos Serrano Zárate; Colombia	Yang Hong; China	Mark Malyar; Israel
SB8	Oscar Salguero Galisteo; Spain	Xu Haijiao; China	Federico Morlacchi; Italy
SB9	Ruan Felipe Lima de Souza; Brazil	Only one medalist	
SB11	Tharon Drake; United States	Miroslav Smrcka; Czech Republic	Mindaugas Dvylaitis; Lithuania
SB12	Uladzimir Izotau; Belarus	Anuar Akhmetov; Kazakhstan	Andrey Afanasyev; Kazakhstan
SB13	Ihar Boki; Belarus	Ivan Salguero Oteiza; Spain	Gerasimos Lignos; Greece
SB14	Adam Ismael Wenham; Norway	Robert Isak Jonsson; Israel	Aymeric Parmentier; Belgium
