= Cheng Jiao =

Chinese Paralympic swimmer

Personal information
- Nationality: Chinese
- Born: 28 April 1994 (age 32)

Sport
- Sport: Swimming
Medal record
Women's paralympic swimming
Representing China
Paralympic Games
Gold medal – first place	2016 Rio de Janeiro	50m backstroke S4
Gold medal – first place	2016 Rio de Janeiro	50m breaststroke SB3
Gold medal – first place	2016 Rio de Janeiro	150m medley SM4
Silver medal – second place	2020 Tokyo	200m medley SM5
Bronze medal – third place	2020 Tokyo	50m butterfly S5
Bronze medal – third place	2024 Paris	100 m breaststroke SB4
Bronze medal – third place	2024 Paris	200 m medley SM5
World Championships
Gold medal – first place	2017 Mexico City	50m breaststroke SB3
Gold medal – first place	2017 Mexico City	50m backstroke S4
Silver medal – second place	2019 London	200m medley SM4
Silver medal – second place	2023 Manchester	200m medley SM4
Silver medal – second place	2023 Manchester	100m breaststroke SB4
Bronze medal – third place	2017 Mexico City	50m freestyle S4
Bronze medal – third place	2019 London	100m breaststroke SB4
Asian Para Games
Silver medal – second place	2022 Hangzhou	200m freestyle S5
Bronze medal – third place	2018 Jakarta	100m freestyle S5
Bronze medal – third place	2018 Jakarta	50m freestyle S5

Cheng Jiao (born 28 April 1994) is a Chinese Paralympian swimmer who won three gold medals in Swimming at the 2016 Summer Paralympics: at the Women's 50 metre backstroke S4 event with 48.11, at the Women's 50 metre breaststroke SB3 event with 58.28, and at the Women's 150 metre individual medley SM4 event with 2:49.69.
