= 2017 World Para Swimming Championships – Women's 50 metre breaststroke =

The women's 50m breaststroke events at the 2017 World Para Swimming Championships were held in Mexico City 2–7 December 2017.

== Medalists ==
Event	Gold	Silver	Bronze
SB3	Cheng Jiao; China	Monica Boggioni; Italy	Patricia Valle; Mexico
