= 2017 World Para Swimming Championships – Men's 100 metre freestyle =

The men's 100m freestyle events at the 2017 World Para Swimming Championships were held in Mexico City between 2–7 December.

== Medalists ==
Event	Gold	Silver	Bronze
S1-5	Daniel Dias; Brazil	Théo Curin; France	Vo Thanh Tung; Vietnam
S6	Lorenzo Perez Escalona; Cuba	Nelson Crispín; Colombia	Antonio Fantin; Italy
S7	Carlos Serrano Zárate; Colombia	Tobias Pollap; Germany	Andreas Skaar Bjornstad; Norway
S8	Xu Haijiao; China	Yang Guanglong; China	Luis Armando Andrade Guillen; Mexico
S9	Simone Barlaam; Italy	Jose Antonio Mari Alcaraz; Spain	Federico Morlacchi; Italy
S10	Andre Brasil; Brazil	Phelipe Andrews Melo Rodrigues; Brazil	David Levecq; Spain
S11	Hryhory Zudzilau; Belarus	Wojciech Makowski; Poland	Edgaras Matakas; Lithuania
S12	Thomaz Rocha Matera; Brazil	Tucker Dupree; United States	Franco Smit; South Africa
S13	Ihar Boki; Belarus	Ivan Salguero Oteiza; Spain	Kamil Rzetelski; Poland
