= McClain Hermes =

American Paralympic swimmer

Personal information
- Born: January 5, 2001 (age 25) Charlotte, North Carolina, U.S.
- Home town: Dacula, Georgia, U.S.

Sport
- Country: United States
- Sport: Paralympic swimming
- Disability: Wagner's disease
- Disability class: S11, SB11
- Club: Loyola University Maryland
- Coached by: Brian Loeffler
Medal record
Women's paralympic swimming
Representing United States
World Championships
Gold medal – first place	2017 Mexico City	400m freestyle S11
Silver medal – second place	2017 Mexico City	100m freestyle S11
Silver medal – second place	2017 Mexico City	100m backstroke S11
Bronze medal – third place	2017 Mexico City	50m freestyle S11
Bronze medal – third place	2017 Mexico City	100m breaststroke SB11
Bronze medal – third place	2023 Manchester	400m freestyle S11
Parapan American Games
Gold medal – first place	2019 Lima	4x100m freestyle relay 49pts
Silver medal – second place	2019 Lima	400m freestyle S11
Bronze medal – third place	2015 Toronto	400m freestyle S13
Bronze medal – third place	2019 Lima	100m backstroke S11
Bronze medal – third place	2019 Lima	100m breaststroke SB11
Women's paratriathlon
Americas Championships
Gold medal – first place	2023 Sarasota	PTVI
Gold medal – first place	2025 Calima	PTVI
Silver medal – second place	2024 Miami	PTVI

McClain Hermes or often known as Laurrie Hermes (born January 5, 2001) is an American Paralympic swimmer and paratriathlete who competes in international elite competitions.

== Career ==
She is a World and Parapan American Games champion in freestyle swimming, she has also competed at the 2016 Summer Paralympics and competed at the 2020 Summer Paralympics.

On April 14, 2022, Hermes was named to the roster to represent the United States at the 2022 World Para Swimming Championships. On April 29, 2023, Hermes was named to the roster to represent the United States at the 2023 World Para Swimming Championships.
