= Anastasiya Zudzilava =

Belarusian para swimmer (born 2001)

Personal information
- Nationality: Belarusian
- Born: 3 May 2001 (age 25)

Sport
- Sport: Para swimming
- Disability class: S13, SB13
Medal record
Women's para swimming
Representing Belarus
World Championships
Silver medal – second place	2017 Mexico City	100 m backstroke S12
Silver medal – second place	2017 Mexico City	100 m breaststroke SB12
European Championships
Silver medal – second place	2020 Funchal	100 m breaststroke SB13
Bronze medal – third place	2018 Dublin	100 m breaststroke SB12
Bronze medal – third place	2026 Kocaeli	100 m breaststroke SB13
Representing Neutral Paralympic Athletes
World Championships
Bronze medal – third place	2025 Singapore	100 m breaststroke SB13

Anastasiya Zudzilava (born 3 May 2001) is a Belarusian para swimmer. She competed at the 2016, 2020 and 2024 Summer Paralympics.

== Career ==
Zudzilava represented Belarus at the 2017 World Para Swimming Championships and won silver medals in the 100 metre backstroke S12 and 100 metre breaststroke SB12 events.

She represented Neutral Paralympic Athletes at the 2024 Summer Paralympics and finished in seventh place in the 100 metre breaststroke SB13 event. She then represented Neutral Paralympic Athletes at the 2025 World Para Swimming Championships and won a bronze medal in the 100 metre breaststroke SB13 event.
