= Yao Cuan =

Chinese Paralympic swimmer

Personal information
- Nationality: Chinese
- Born: 6 June 1997 (age 29) Cixi, Zhejiang, China

Sport
- Sport: Paralympic swimming
- Disability class: S5, SB4
- Coached by: Feng Jie
Medal record
Women's Paralympic swimming
Representing China
Paralympic Games
| Gold medal – first place | 2024 Paris | Mixed 4×50 m medley relay 20pts |
| Bronze medal – third place | 2020 Tokyo | 100 m breaststroke SB4 |
World Championships
| Bronze medal – third place | 2017 Mexico City | 200 m freestyle |
Asian Para Games
| Gold medal – first place | 2018 Jakarta | 50 m freestyle S5 |
| Gold medal – first place | 2018 Jakarta | 100 m freestyle S5 |
| Gold medal – first place | 2018 Jakarta | 200 m freestyle S5 |
| Gold medal – first place | 2022 Hangzhou | 4×50 m medley relay 20 pts |
| Silver medal – second place | 2018 Jakarta | 4×50 m freestyle relay 20 pts |

Yao Cuan (born 6 June 1997) is a Chinese Paralympic swimmer. She represented China at the Summer Paralympics.

== Career ==
Cuan made her international debut for China at the 2016 Summer Paralympics. She represented China in the women's 100 metre breaststroke SB4 event at the 2020 Summer Paralympics and won a bronze medal.
