= McKenzie Coan =

American Paralympic swimmer (born 1996)

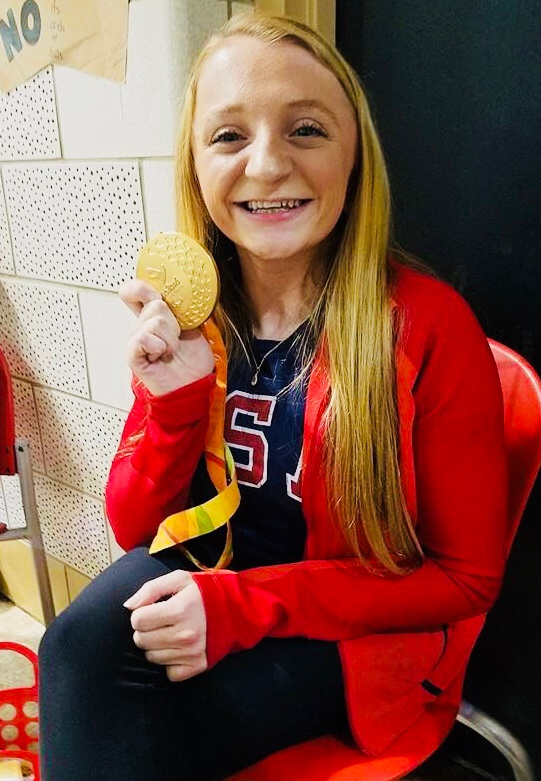
- Coan in 2018

Personal information
- Full name: McKenzie Rae Coan
- Nickname: "Kenzie" "BigMac" "Small Fry"
- National team: United States
- Born: June 14, 1996 (age 30) Toccoa, Georgia, U.S.

Sport
- Sport: Swimming
- Events: Freestyle, Butterfly, Backstroke
- College team: Loyola University Maryland
Medal record
Women's para swimming
Representing United States
Paralympic Games
Gold medal – first place	2016 Rio de Janeiro	50 m freestyle S7
Gold medal – first place	2016 Rio de Janeiro	100 m freestyle S7
Gold medal – first place	2016 Rio de Janeiro	400 m freestyle S7
Gold medal – first place	2020 Tokyo	400 m freestyle S7
Silver medal – second place	2016 Rio de Janeiro	4×100 m freestyle 34pts
Silver medal – second place	2020 Tokyo	100 m freestyle S7
Silver medal – second place	2024 Paris	400 m freestyle S7
World Championships
Gold medal – first place	2017 Mexico City	50 m freestyle S7
Gold medal – first place	2017 Mexico City	100 m freestyle S7
Gold medal – first place	2017 Mexico City	400 m freestyle S7
Gold medal – first place	2017 Mexico City	4×100 m freestyle
Gold medal – first place	2019 London	100 m freestyle S7
Gold medal – first place	2019 London	400 m freestyle S7
Gold medal – first place	2022 Madeira	400 m freestyle S7
Gold medal – first place	2022 Madeira	50 m freestyle S7
Gold medal – first place	2022 Madeira	100 m freestyle S7
Silver medal – second place	2019 London	50 m freestyle S7
Silver medal – second place	2019 London	4×100 m freestyle 34pts
Silver medal – second place	2015 Glasgow	4×100 m freestyle 34pts
Silver medal – second place	2022 Madeira	mixed 4×100 m freestyle 34pts
Silver medal – second place	2017 Mexico City	50 m butterfly S7
Bronze medal – third place	2022 Madeira	100 m backstroke S7
Parapan American Games
Silver medal – second place	2023 Santiago	100 m backstroke S7
Silver medal – second place	2023 Santiago	100 m freestyle S7
Bronze medal – third place	2023 Santiago	50 m freestyle S8
Bronze medal – third place	2023 Santiago	400 m freestyle S8

McKenzie Coan (born June 14, 1996) is an American swimmer. At the 2012 Summer Paralympics in London, she swam the 400m Freestyle in the S8 category. Coan was one of four S8 category swimmers chosen to compete for Team USA at the games. She later had her breakout games in the 2016 Summer Paralympics, where she would go on to win 3 gold medals in the category S7 50, 100, and 400M Freestyle races, with an additional silver medal in the 34-point women's 4 × 100 m Freestyle relay. In the process of getting her gold medal in the 50M Freestyle she also set a new Paralympic Record.

== Early life and education ==
Coan was born on June 14, 1996, in Toccoa, Georgia. Coan grew up in Clarkesville, Georgia, with her parents, Marc, an internal medicine physician, and Teresa Coan, who owns a swim team. Coan has two siblings. She has the connective tissue disorder "Osteogenesis imperfecta", which is most associated with brittle bones. Coan has broken over 50 bones in her lifetime. In addition to swimming, Coan participated in Girl Scouts, track and field, and mock trial in her youth. In her high school years, Coan was on the board of the Georgia Swimming LSC, she was Secretary of the Georgia Olympians Association and also had her own foundation where she volunteered her time to local children's hospitals.

Coan attended a specialized program for high school which allowed her to be in a regular classroom for part of the week and at home for the other days which allotted much more time and flexibility to her training schedule. Coan graduated from high school in 2014 and was academically ranked at the top of her class.

Coan currently attends and swims for Loyola University Maryland where she is pursuing a degree in political science. She has expressed very publicly her desire to attend law school after her undergraduate studies commence and to one day run for public office. She is also very involved in matters of social justice, particularly in disability rights and advocacy.

== Swimming career ==
Coan is an S7-6-7 category swimmer, who is ranked first in the world in the 50m, 100m, 400m and 1500m freestyle events. Coan is an American record holder from her previous classifications of S8 and S9 in the 100m Individual Medley and the 400m freestyle, as well as a multiple time American record holder in her current S7 classification. Coan started swimming competitively at the age of five after both of her brothers joined a local swim team. She is currently a member of the Loyola University Maryland varsity team which competes at the NCAA Division 1 level. Coan was also a member of the Cumming Waves Swim Team, where she was team captain throughout high school.

Coan's main talents are in that of the freestyle and backstroke events. Although she was scheduled to compete in 3 events at first games in London in 2012, Coan was forced to withdraw from the 100m backstroke and 200m IM because of a teammate's reclassification status. Coan managed to come out 6th overall in the 400m freestyle final on 31 August 2012. She came out ranked 4th overall in the IPC Swimming World Rankings.

Coan recently committed to swim for Paralympic national team Coach Brian Loeffler at Loyola University in Maryland. She will join a number of other Paralympic athletes as part of her training group through Rio 2016.

Coan has expressed her desire to continue to train for the next games in Tokyo in 2020 as she comes towards the end of her collegiate swimming career at Loyola it is unclear where she will train for the 2020 Games.

=== 2016 Paralympics ===
She won three individual gold medals at the 2016 Summer Paralympics. She also set a Paralympic record in the 50 Meter Freestyle final. Coan competed in six events at the 2016 Games: 50m Freestyle 100m Freestyle, 400m Freestyle, 100m Backstroke, 100m Butterfly and the 4 × 100 m Freestyle Relay. Coan earned gold medals in the 50m, 100m and 400m Freestyle events, putting her in a very small group of individuals to ever win every event of one stroke at a Games. Coan also earned a silver medal as part of the 4 × 100 m freestyle relay.

=== 2017 World Championships ===
Coan swam in the 2017 Para-Swimming World Championships in Mexico City, Mexico. She repeated her gold medal hall from the previous year's games in that she won golds in the 50m, 100m, and 400m S7 freestyle events. She also won a silver in the 50m butterfly and gold as part of the women's 4 × 100 m freestyle 34 point relay.

=== 2018 ===
On June 8, 2018, Coan broke her first career world record at a Para World Series meet in Berlin, Germany in the S7 800m freestyle. She set the new mark by a staggering 37 seconds, swimming the race in 10:37.

Later that year, Coan would set the S7 World Record in the 1500m Freestyle at the 2018 U.S. Paralympics Para-Swim Championships in Arizona.

=== 2019 ===
At the 2019 Para-Swimming World Championships in London, England, Coan won the 100m and 400m Freestyle events, defending her 2017 World Champion titles. Coan was also part of the 4 × 100 m Freestyle and 4 × 100 m Medley 34pt relay teams.

In March 2019, Coan signed a sponsorship with Adidas and Adidas Swim, making her one of the highest paid Para-Swimmers in the world. Coan also signed endorsement deals with Numotion and LendingTree later in 2019.

=== 2020 ===
Coan relocated to Colorado Springs in order to live and train at the U.S. Olympic and Paralympic Training Center under Paralympic national team coach Nathan Manley. In June 2021 the US announced the 34 Paralympic swimmers who would be going to the delayed 2020 Summer Paralympics in Tokyo. The women's team included Coan, Jessica Long, Elizabeth Marks, Rebecca Meyers and Mallory Weggemann.

=== 2022 ===
On April 14, 2022, Coan was named to the roster to represent the United States at the 2022 World Para Swimming Championships.

=== 2023 ===
On April 29, 2023, Coan was named to the roster to represent the United States at the 2023 World Para Swimming Championships.

== Memoir ==
Coan's autobiography "Breaking Free: Shattering Expectations and Thriving with Ambition in Pursuit of Gold", co-authored with Holly Neumann, was released August 11, 2021, a few weeks prior to her competing at the 2020 Paralympic Games in Tokyo.
