= Monica Boggioni =

Italian Paralympic swimmer (born 1998)

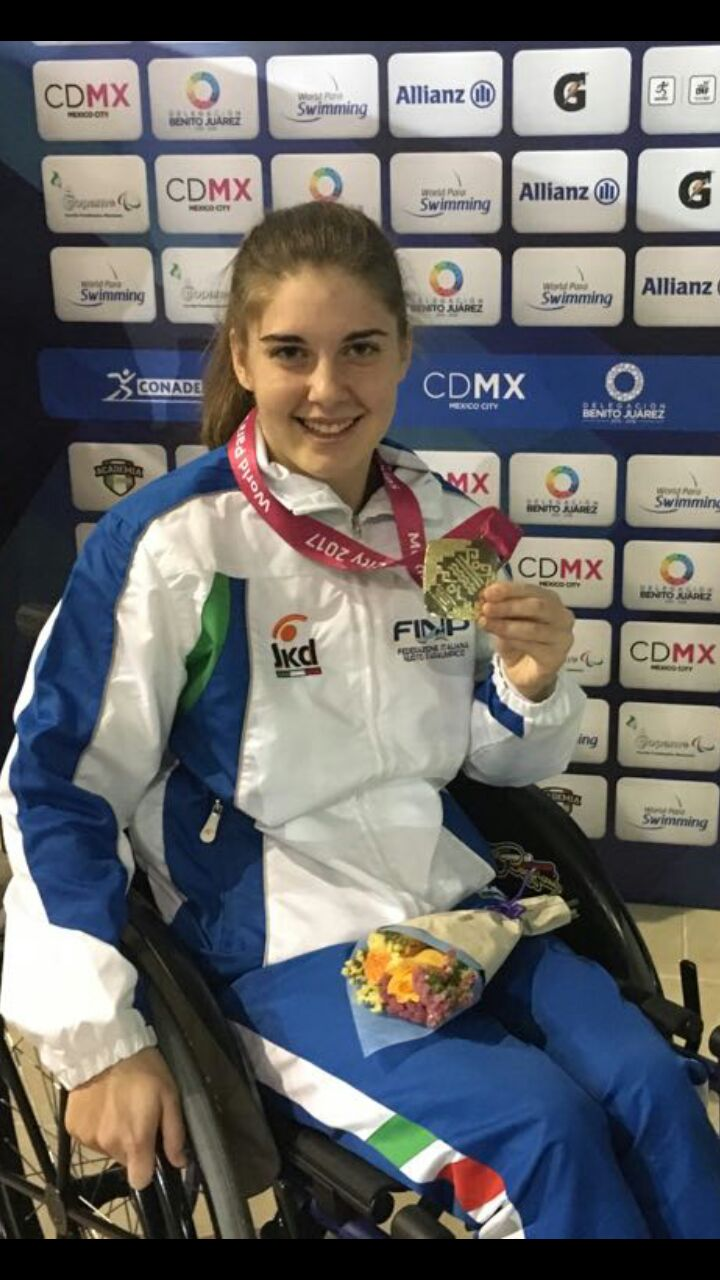

Personal information
- Born: 5 August 1998 (age 28) Pavia, Italy

Sport
- Country: Italy
- Sport: Paralympic swimming
- Disability: Dystonia
- Disability class: SM5, SB4, S5
- Club: AIC Pavia Nuoto
- Coached by: Guy Soffientin (2014 - )
Medal record
Women's para swimming
Representing Italy
Event	1st	2nd	3rd
Paralympics	1	0	5
World Championships	10	6	4
European Championships	4	4	3
Total	15	10	12
Paralympic Games
Gold medal – first place	2024 Paris	50 m breaststroke SB3
Bronze medal – third place	2020 Tokyo	100 m freestyle S5
Bronze medal – third place	2020 Tokyo	200 m freestyle S5
Bronze medal – third place	2020 Tokyo	200 m ind. medley SM5
Bronze medal – third place	2024 Paris	100 m freestyle S5
Bronze medal – third place	2024 Paris	200 m freestyle S5
World Championships
Gold medal – first place	2017 Mexico City	50m freestyle S4
Gold medal – first place	2017 Mexico City	100m freestyle S4
Gold medal – first place	2017 Mexico City	150m medley SM4
Gold medal – first place	2022 Madeira	200m ind. medley SM5
Gold medal – first place	2023 Manchester	50m breaststroke SB3
Gold medal – first place	2023 Manchester	100m freestyle S5
Gold medal – first place	2023 Manchester	200m freestyle S5
Gold medal – first place	2025 Singapore	50m freestyle S5
Gold medal – first place	2025 Singapore	50m breaststroke SB3
Gold medal – first place	2025 Singapore	100m freestyle S5
Gold medal – first place	2025 Singapore	200m freestyle S5
Silver medal – second place	2017 Mexico City	50m backstroke S4
Silver medal – second place	2017 Mexico City	50m breaststroke SB3
Silver medal – second place	2017 Mexico City	Mixed 4x50m freestyle
Silver medal – second place	2022 Madeira	100m freestyle S5
Silver medal – second place	2022 Madeira	200m freestyle S5
Silver medal – second place	2025 Singapore	200 m ind. medley SM5
Bronze medal – third place	2019 London	50m backstroke S5
Bronze medal – third place	2019 London	200m freestyle S5
Bronze medal – third place	2022 Madeira	50m freestyle S5
Bronze medal – third place	2022 Madeira	50m backstroke S5
European Championships
Silver medal – second place	2018 Dublin	50m freestyle S5
Silver medal – second place	2018 Dublin	100m freestyle S5
Silver medal – second place	2018 Dublin	200m freestyle S5
Silver medal – second place	2018 Dublin	Mixed 4x50m medley
Bronze medal – third place	2018 Dublin	50m backstroke S5

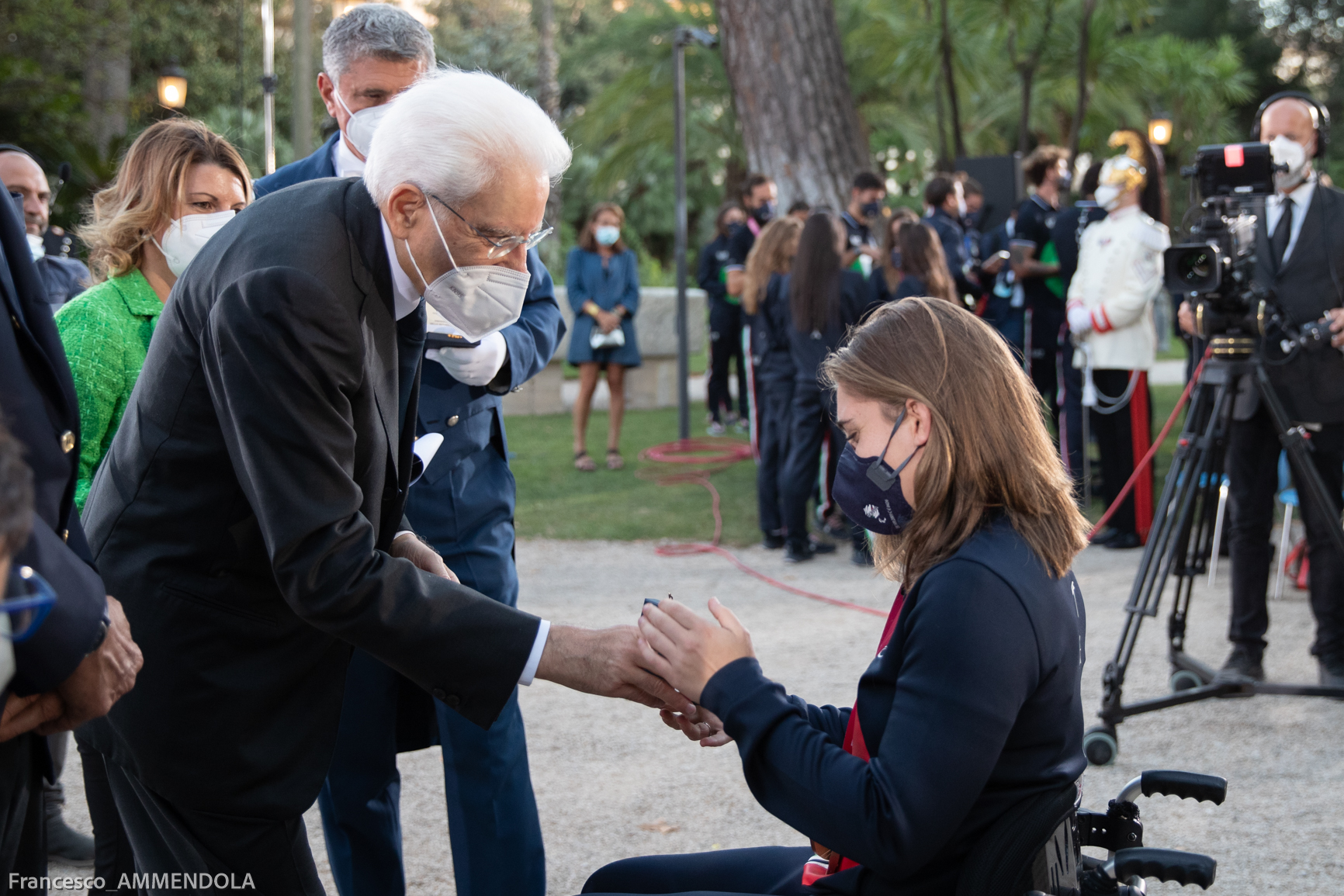
Boggioni awarded by Sergio Mattarella at Quirinale in 2021.

Monica Boggioni (born 5 August 1998) is an Italian Paralympic swimmer who competes in international level events. She competed at the 2020 Summer Paralympics, winning bronze medals in the 100 metre freestyle S5, and 200 metre freestyle S5.

== Career ==
She graduated from University of Pavia. She competed at the 2017 World Para Swimming Championships, and 2019 World Para Swimming Championships. She was recently reclassified to an S5 swimmer.
