= Cai Liwen =

Chinese Paralympic swimmer

Personal information
- Born: 7 October 1998 (age 27) Qingdao, Shandong, China

Sport
- Country: China
- Sport: Paralympic swimming
- Event(s): Backstroke, freestyle, medley
Medal record
Representing China
Summer Paralympics
| Gold medal – first place | 2020 Tokyo | 100m backstroke S11 |
| Gold medal – first place | 2024 Paris | 100 m backstroke S11 |
| Silver medal – second place | 2020 Tokyo | 200 m medley SM11 |
| Silver medal – second place | 2016 Rio de Janeiro | 100 m backstroke S11 |
| Bronze medal – third place | 2020 Tokyo | 100 m freestyle S11 |
| Bronze medal – third place | 2020 Tokyo | 400 m freestyle S11 |
| Bronze medal – third place | 2024 Paris | 200 m medley SM11 |
World Championships
| Gold medal – first place | 2017 Mexico City | 50 m freestyle S11 |
| Gold medal – first place | 2017 Mexico City | 100 m backstroke S11 |
| Silver medal – second place | 2017 Mexico City | 400 m freestyle S11 |
| Silver medal – second place | 2023 Manchester | 200 m medley SM11 |
| Silver medal – second place | 2023 Manchester | 100 m backstroke S11 |
| Silver medal – second place | 2023 Manchester | 400 m freestyle S11 |
| Bronze medal – third place | 2019 London | 400 m freestyle S11 |
Asian Para Games
| Gold medal – first place | 2018 Jakarta | 100 m freestyle S11 |
| Silver medal – second place | 2018 Jakarta | 200 m medley SM11 |
| Silver medal – second place | 2022 Hangzhou | 400 m freestyle S11 |

Cai Liwen (born 7 October 1998) is a Chinese Paralympic swimmer.

== Career ==
She represented China at the 2016 Summer Paralympics held in Rio de Janeiro, Brazil and she won the silver medal in the women's 100 metre backstroke S11 event. She competed at the 2017 World Para Swimming Championships held in Mexico City, Mexico and at the 2019 World Para Swimming Championships held in London, United Kingdom. At the 2020 Summer Paralympics she won the gold medal in the 100m Backstroke S11 with a world record of 1:13.46, one silver medal and one bronze medal.

In 2018, she competed at the Asian Para Games held in Jakarta, Indonesia. She won one gold medal and one silver medal.
