= Carlotta Gilli =

Italian Paralympic swimmer

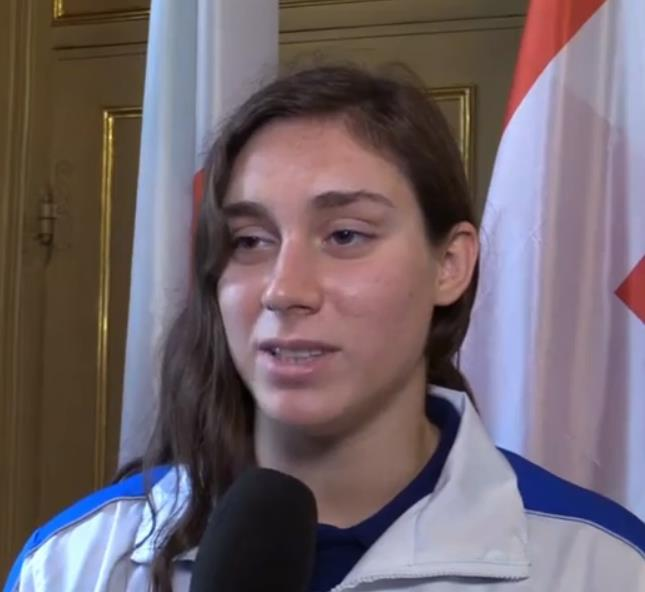
- Carlotta Gilli in 2020.

Personal information
- Nicknames: Il Defino di Muncale; Wonder Gilli
- National team: Italy
- Born: 13 January 2001 (age 25) Turin, Italy
- Height: 1.71 m (5 ft 7 in)
- Website: Official website

Sport
- Sport: Paralympic swimming
- Disability: Stargardt disease
- Disability class: S13, SB13, SM13
- Event: Polyvalent
- Club: Rari Nantes Torino; G.S. Fiamme Oro
- Coached by: Andrea Grassini
Medal record
Paralympic swimming
Representing Italy
Event	1st	2nd	3rd
Paralympics	4	3	3
World Championships	13	8	4
European Championships	13	3	1
Total	30	14	8
Paralympic Games
Gold medal – first place	2020 Tokyo	100m butterfly S13
Gold medal – first place	2020 Tokyo	200m medley SM13
Gold medal – first place	2024 Paris	100 m butterfly S13
Gold medal – first place	2024 Paris	200 m medley SM13
Silver medal – second place	2020 Tokyo	100m backstroke S13
Silver medal – second place	2020 Tokyo	400m freestyle S13
Silver medal – second place	2024 Paris	400 m freestyle S13
Bronze medal – third place	2020 Tokyo	50m freestyle S13
Bronze medal – third place	2024 Paris	50 m freestyle S13
Bronze medal – third place	2024 Paris	100m backstroke S13
World Championships
Gold medal – first place	2017 Mexico City	50m freestyle S13
Gold medal – first place	2017 Mexico City	100m freestyle S13
Gold medal – first place	2017 Mexico City	100m backstroke S13
Gold medal – first place	2017 Mexico City	100m butterfly S13
Gold medal – first place	2017 Mexico City	200m medley SM13
Gold medal – first place	2019 London	50m freestyle S13
Gold medal – first place	2019 London	100m freestyle S13
Gold medal – first place	2019 London	100m backstroke S13
Gold medal – first place	2019 London	200m medley SM13
Gold medal – first place	2022 Madeira	100m butterfly S13
Gold medal – first place	2023 Manchester	100m butterfly S13
Gold medal – first place	2023 Manchester	400m freestyle S13
Gold medal – first place	2023 Manchester	200m medley SM13
Silver medal – second place	2017 Mexico City	400m freestyle S13
Silver medal – second place	2019 London	100m butterfly S13
Silver medal – second place	2022 Madeira	200m medley SM13
Silver medal – second place	2023 Manchester	50m freestyle S8
Silver medal – second place	2023 Manchester	100m backstroke S13
Silver medal – second place	2025 Singapore	100m butterfly S13
Silver medal – second place	2025 Singapore	100m freestyle S13
Silver medal – second place	2025 Singapore	200m medley SM13
Bronze medal – third place	2019 London	400m freestyle S13
Bronze medal – third place	2022 Madeira	100m freestyle S13
Bronze medal – third place	2022 Madeira	400m freestyle S13
Bronze medal – third place	2025 Singapore	100m backstroke S13
European Championships
Gold medal – first place	2018 Dublin	50m freestyle S13
Gold medal – first place	2018 Dublin	100m freestyle S13
Gold medal – first place	2018 Dublin	100m backstroke S13
Gold medal – first place	2018 Dublin	200m medley SM13
Gold medal – first place	2020 Funchal	100m freestyle S13
Gold medal – first place	2020 Funchal	100m backstroke S13
Gold medal – first place	2020 Funchal	100m butterfly S13
Gold medal – first place	2020 Funchal	200m medley SM13
Silver medal – second place	2020 Funchal	50m freestyle S13
Silver medal – second place	2020 Funchal	400m freestyle S13
Bronze medal – third place	2018 Dublin	4x100m freestyle relay

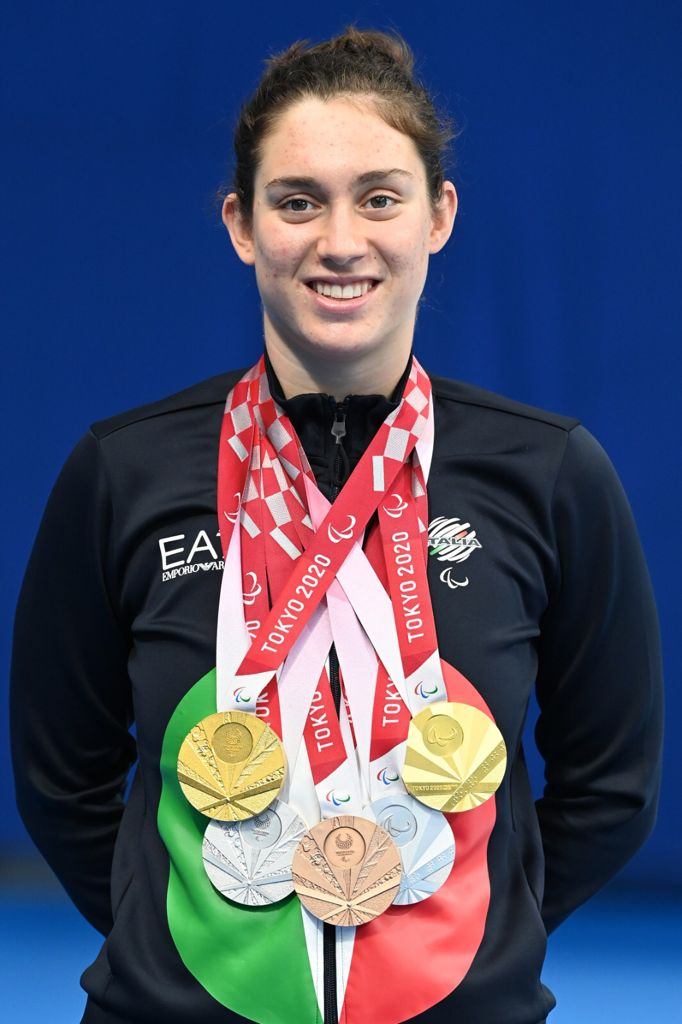
Carlotta shows her five medals won in Tokyio 2020. She was the most decorated athlete of the Italian team at the event.

Carlotta Gilli (born 13 January 2001) is a partially sighted Italian Paralympic swimmer who competes in international level events. She holds twelve world records in her class. She won five medals at the 2020 Summer Paralympics. She repeated this feat by winning five medals at the 2024 Summer Paralympics too.

== Biography ==
She studied at the University of Turin. She competed at the 2017 World Para Swimming Championships.

== Achievements ==
Year	Competition	Venue	50 m freestyle	100 m freestyle	400 m freestyle	100 m backstroke	100 m butterfly	200 m medley	4×100 m freestyle
2017	World Championships	Mexico City	1st place, gold medalist(s)	1st place, gold medalist(s)	2nd place, silver medalist(s)	1st place, gold medalist(s)	1st place, gold medalist(s)	1st place, gold medalist(s)	-
2018	European Championships	(Republic of Ireland) Dublin	1st place, gold medalist(s)	1st place, gold medalist(s)	-	1st place, gold medalist(s)	-	1st place, gold medalist(s)	3rd place, bronze medalist(s)
2019	World Championships	(United Kingdom) London	1st place, gold medalist(s)	1st place, gold medalist(s)	3rd place, bronze medalist(s)	1st place, gold medalist(s)	2nd place, silver medalist(s)	1st place, gold medalist(s)	5th
2021	European Championships	(Portugal) Funchal	2nd place, silver medalist(s)	1st place, gold medalist(s)	2nd place, silver medalist(s)	1st place, gold medalist(s)	1st place, gold medalist(s)	1st place, gold medalist(s)	-
2021	Paralympics Games	(Japan) Tokyo	3rd place, bronze medalist(s)		2nd place, silver medalist(s)	2nd place, silver medalist(s)	1st place, gold medalist(s)	1st place, gold medalist(s)	
2024	Paralympics Games	(France) Paris	3rd place, bronze medalist(s)		2nd place, silver medalist(s)	3rd place, bronze medalist(s)	1st place, gold medalist(s)	1st place, gold medalist(s)	

== Records ==
Gilli is the holder of 7 world records in the long course, 5 world records in the short course, and 2 European records in the long course:

=== World record in long course ===
- 50 freestyle 26”67 (Trophy Sette Colli, Roma 29/6/2018)
- 100 backstroke 1’05”76 (European Championships Dublin 17/8/2018)
- 100 butterfly 1’02”22 (World Series Lignano Sabbiadoro 27/5/2018)
- 100 freestyle 57”34 (Trophy Sette Colli, Roma 30/6/2018)
- 50 butterfly 27”98 (IDM Berlin 9/7/2017)
- 200 butterfly 2’24”07 (Trophy Sette Colli, Roma 1/7/2018)
- 400 Mixed 5’08”86 (IDM Berlin 7/6/2018)

=== European record in long course ===
- 200 freestyle 2’08”01 (Trophy Sette Colli, Roma 23/6/2018)
- 200 mixed 2’22”12 (European Championships Dublin 15/8/2018)

=== World record in short course ===
- 100 freestyle 59”30 (Italian Championships FINP, Loano, 2/12/2018)
- 100 butterfly 1’03”92 (Italian Championships FINP, Loano, 2/12/2018)
- 100 backstroke 1’06”44 (Italian Championships FINP, Portici, 30/11/2019)
- 50 freestyle 27”07 (Italian Championships FINP, Portici, 30/11/2019)
- 50 butterfly 29”43 (Italian Championships FINP, Portici, 30/11/2019)

== See also ==
- Italy at the 2020 Summer Paralympics - Medalists
- Italy at the 2024 Summer Paralympics
