= Colleen Young (swimmer) =

American Paralympic swimmer (born 1998)

Personal information
- Nationality: United States
- Born: June 29, 1998 (age 28)

Sport
- Sport: Swimming
- Strokes: Breaststroke
Medal record
Women's swimming
Representing the United States
Paralympic Games
Silver medal – second place	2020 Tokyo	200 m ind. medley SM13
Bronze medal – third place	2016 Rio	100 m breaststroke SB13
Bronze medal – third place	2020 Tokyo	100 m breaststroke SB13
Bronze medal – third place	2024 Paris	100 m breaststroke SB13
World Championships
Gold medal – first place	2017 Mexico City	100 m breaststroke SB13
Gold medal – first place	2022 Madeira	100 m breaststroke SB13
Gold medal – first place	2022 Madeira	200 m ind. medley SM13
Silver medal – second place	2013 Montreal	100 m backstroke S13
Silver medal – second place	2013 Montreal	100 m breaststroke SB13
Silver medal – second place	2017 Mexico City	200 m individual medley SM13
Silver medal – second place	2019 London	100 m breaststroke SB13
Silver medal – second place	2023 Manchester	100m breaststroke SB13
Bronze medal – third place	2013 Montreal	400 m freestyle S13
Bronze medal – third place	2015 Glasgow	100 m backstroke S13
Bronze medal – third place	2015 Glasgow	100 m breaststroke SB13
Bronze medal – third place	2017 Mexico City	100 m backstroke S13

Colleen Young (born June 29, 1998) is an American swimmer. She is a three-time Paralympian earning a bronze medal at the 2016 Paralympic Games, as well as a bronze and a silver medal at the 2020 Paralympic Games. She has also earned multiple gold, silver and bronze medals at World Championships. She competes in the Paralympic class S13. In 2016 she set a Pan-American record in the 100m breaststroke.

== Career ==
In 2012 she swam four individual events at the 2012 Paralympic Games, where she was the youngest Paralympian on Team USA. Young reached the final in the 100m Breaststroke SB13 placing 5th, and the 200m Individual Medley SM13 placing 7th. She placed 10th in the 100m Freestyle S13 and 12th in the 50m Freestyle S13.

In 2016 she won the bronze medal in the 100 m breaststroke SB13 at the 2016 Paralympic Games. Young reached the final in the 100m Backstroke S13 placing 4th, and in the 200m Individual Medley SM13 placing 5th. She also placed 9th in the 50m Freestyle S13.

In 2020 she won the silver medal in the 200m Individual Medley SM13 and the bronze medal in the 100m Breaststroke SB13 at the 2020 Paralympic Games. Young reached the final in the 100m Backstroke S13 placing 8th. She also placed 20th in the 50m Freestyle S13.

On April 14, 2022, Young was named to the roster to represent the United States at the 2022 World Para Swimming Championships. On April 29, 2023, Young was named to the roster to represent the United States at the 2023 World Para Swimming Championships.

On June 30, 2024, Young was named to the roster to represent the United States at the 2024 Paralympic Games.

Young won the bronze medal in the 100 m Breaststroke SB13 at the 2024 Paralympic Games.

== Personal life ==
Young attended Fairfield University, where she was a member of the Women's Swimming & Diving team and graduated a Bachelor's degree in Communication in 2020.
