= Núria Marquès =

Spanish Paralympic swimmer

Núria Marquès Soto
Personal information
- Born: 4 May 1999 (age 27) Castellví de Rosanes, Spain

Sport
- Country: Spain
- Sport: Paralympic swimming
- Disability class: S9
- Club: Sant Feliu Swimming Club
Medal record
Paralympic swimming
Representing Spain
Paralympic Games
Gold medal – first place	2016 Rio de Janeiro	400m freestyle S9
Silver medal – second place	2016 Rio de Janeiro	100m backstroke S9
Silver medal – second place	2020 Tokyo	100m backstroke S9
Silver medal – second place	2024 Paris	100 m backstroke S9
Silver medal – second place	2024 Paris	200 m medley SM9
Bronze medal – third place	2020 Tokyo	200m medley SM9
Bronze medal – third place	2024 Paris	Mixed 4×100 m medley relay 34pts
World Championships
Gold medal – first place	2017 Mexico City	100m backstroke S9
Gold medal – first place	2017 Mexico City	400m freestyle S9
Gold medal – first place	2017 Mexico City	200m medley SM9
Gold medal – first place	2019 London	200m medley SM9
Gold medal – first place	2022 Madeira	100m backstroke S9
Gold medal – first place	2025 Singapore	Mixed 4×100 m medley relay 34pts
Silver medal – second place	2015 Glasgow	400m freestyle S9
Silver medal – second place	2017 Mexico City	50m freestyle S9
Silver medal – second place	2017 Mexico City	100m freestyle S9
Silver medal – second place	2023 Manchester	100m backstroke S9
Silver medal – second place	2023 Manchester	200m medley SM9
Silver medal – second place	2025 Singapore	100 m backstroke S9
Bronze medal – third place	2015 Glasgow	100m backstroke S9
Bronze medal – third place	2015 Glasgow	100m butterfly S9
Bronze medal – third place	2015 Glasgow	100m freestyle S9
Bronze medal – third place	2017 Mexico City	100m butterfly S9
Bronze medal – third place	2019 London	4x100m medley relay
European Championships
Gold medal – first place	2016 Funchal	100m backstroke S9
Gold medal – first place	2016 Funchal	4x100m freestyle relay
Gold medal – first place	2018 Dublin	100m backstroke S9
Gold medal – first place	2018 Dublin	200m medley SM9
Silver medal – second place	2014 Eindhoven	4x100m freestyle relay
Silver medal – second place	2016 Funchal	100m butterfly S9
Silver medal – second place	2016 Funchal	100m freestyle S9
Silver medal – second place	2016 Funchal	400m freestyle S9
Silver medal – second place	2018 Dublin	100m freestyle S9
Silver medal – second place	2018 Dublin	400m freestyle S9
Silver medal – second place	2018 Dublin	100m breaststroke SB8
Silver medal – second place	2018 Dublin	4x100m medley relay
Bronze medal – third place	2014 Eindhoven	100m backstroke S9
Bronze medal – third place	2014 Eindhoven	4x100m medley relay
Bronze medal – third place	2018 Dublin	50m freestyle S9
Bronze medal – third place	2018 Dublin	100m butterfly S9

Núria Marquès Soto (born 4 May 1999) is a Spanish Paralympic swimmer who competes in international level events.
