= Tatiana Blattnerová =

Slovak paralympic swimmer (born 2002)

Tatiana Blatternová
Personal information
- Nickname: Shark
- Born: 16 March 2002 (age 24) Bratislava, Slovakia

Sport
- Country: Slovakia
- Sport: Paralympic swimming
- Disability: Leber congenital amaurosis
- Disability class: S11
Medal record
Paralympic swimming
Representing Slovakia
World Championships
Silver medal – second place	2017 Mexico City	50m freestyle S11
Bronze medal – third place	2017 Mexico City	100m freestyle S11
Bronze medal – third place	2017 Mexico City	400m freestyle S11
European Championships
Silver medal – second place	2020 Funchal	100m breaststroke SB11

Tatiana Blattnerová (born 16 March 2002) is a Slovak Paralympic swimmer who competes in international swimming competitions. She is a three-time World medalist and a European silver medalist, she has also competed at the 2020 Summer Paralympics where she did not medal.
