= Verena Schott =

German Paralympic swimmer

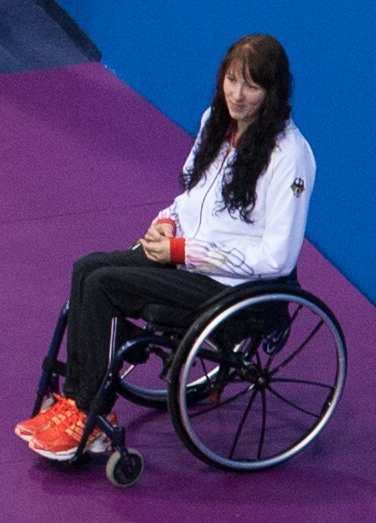
- Schott at a medal ceremony at the 2012 Paralympics

Personal information
- Nationality: German
- Born: 6 March 1989 (age 37) Greifswald, Bezirk Rostock, East Germany (now Mecklenburg-Western Pomerania)

Sport
- Disability: Incomplete paraplegia
- Disability class: S7, SB5, SM6
Medal record
Women's para swimming
Representing Germany
Paralympic Games
Silver medal – second place	2012 London	200 m medley SM6
Bronze medal – third place	2020 Tokyo	200 m medley SM6
Bronze medal – third place	2020 Tokyo	100 m breaststroke SB5
Bronze medal – third place	2020 Tokyo	100 m backstroke S6
World Championships
Gold medal – first place	2015 Glasgow	100 m breaststroke SB5
Gold medal – first place	2023 Manchester	100 m breaststroke SB5
Silver medal – second place	2010 Eindhoven	100 m breaststroke SB5
Silver medal – second place	2010 Eindhoven	200 m medley SM6
Silver medal – second place	2013 Montreal	200 m medley SM6
Silver medal – second place	2023 Manchester	200 m medley SM6
Silver medal – second place	2023 Manchester	50 m butterfly S6
Bronze medal – third place	2013 Montreal	100 m breaststroke SB5
Bronze medal – third place	2015 Glasgow	200 m medley SM6
European Championships
Gold medal – first place	2016 Funchal	100 m backstroke S7
Gold medal – first place	2026 Kocaeli	200 m medley SM6
Silver medal – second place	2009 Reykjavik	400 m freestyle – S7
Silver medal – second place	2009 Reykjavik	50 metre butterfly S7
Silver medal – second place	2009 Reykjavik	100 metre backstroke S7
Silver medal – second place	2009 Reykjavik	50 m freestyle – S7
Silver medal – second place	2009 Reykjavik	100 m freestyle – S7
Silver medal – second place	2016 Funchal	400 m freestyle S7
Silver medal – second place	2026 Kocaeli	100 m backstroke S6
Silver medal – second place	2026 Kocaeli	400 m freestyle S6
Bronze medal – third place	2009 Reykjavik	200 m individual medley SM6
Bronze medal – third place	2016 Funchal	100 m freestyle S7
Bronze medal – third place	2016 Funchal	200 m individual medley SM6
Bronze medal – third place	2016 Funchal	200m medley SM6
Bronze medal – third place	2026 Kocaeli	100 m freestyle S6

Verena Schott (born 6 March 1989) is a German paraswimmer and Paralympic medal winner.

== Early life ==
Schott was born in 1989 in Greifswald. At the age of three, she and her family moved to Bennewitz, Saxony; when she was eight, she took up swimming and joined a swimming club in nearby Wurzen. In 2002, she was severely injured riding her bicycle when a van hit her while overtaking. This left her with incomplete paraplegia and she now uses a wheelchair.

== Career ==
She competes in the S7, SM6 and SB5 classifications.

In 2010 Schott left the club in Leipzig where she had been training when she moved to Berlin to study biology at the Humboldt University of Berlin. There she began training with Matthias Ulm at Berlin's Paralympic Sport Club (PSC Berlin). She had a son, Lean, in June 2011.

Schott competed at the 2010 IPC Swimming World Championships where she won silver medals in the SB5 100 m breaststroke and SM6 200 m individual medley. At the London 2012 Paralympics she reached the finals in four disciplines and won the silver medal in the SM6 200 m medley, coming second to Ellie Simmonds, who posted a world record time. At the 2013 World Championships she again came second in the 200 m medley, as well as winning bronze in the 100 m breaststroke.

Schott was at the World Para Swimming Allianz Championships in 2019 in London. She competed in the 100m backstroke S6 and took gold beating the world record holder Song Lingling.
