= Vendula Dušková =

Czech Paralympic swimmer

Personal information
- Nickname: Vendy
- Born: 4 June 1998 (age 28) Karlovy Vary, Czech Republic
- Height: 1.41 m (4 ft 8 in)

Sport
- Country: Czech Republic
- Sport: Paralympic swimming
- Disability class: S8
Medal record
Paralympic swimming
Representing Czech Republic
World Championships
Bronze medal – third place	2017 Mexico City	Women's 400m freestyle S8
Bronze medal – third place	2017 Mexico City	Women's 100m breaststroke SB7
European Championships
Silver medal – second place	2016 Funchal	Women's 400m freestyle S8
Silver medal – second place	2018 Dublin	Women's 100m breaststroke SB7
Bronze medal – third place	2016 Funchal	Women's 100m breaststroke SB7

Vendula Dušková (born 4 June 1998) is a Czech Paralympic swimmer who competes in international elite events. She is a double World bronze medalist and a three time European medalist, she has also competed at the 2016 Summer Paralympics but did not medal in her events.

Dušková was born with a congenital birth defect and had a tumour in her spinal cord aged seven months which resulted in nerve damage to her legs. The tumour got removed when she was nine months old.
