= Bianka Pap =

Hungarian Paralympic swimmer

Personal information
- Born: 7 February 2000 (age 26) Szigetvár, Hungary
- Height: 1.62 m (5 ft 4 in)
- Weight: 52 kg (115 lb)

Sport
- Sport: Swimming
- Classifications: S10, SM10
- Club: Vasas SC
Medal record
Women's para swimming
Representing Hungary
Paralympic Games
Gold medal – first place	2020 Tokyo	100 m backstroke S10
Gold medal – first place	2024 Paris	100 m backstroke S10
Silver medal – second place	2016 Rio de Janeiro	100 m backstroke S10
Silver medal – second place	2020 Tokyo	200 m medley SM10
Silver medal – second place	2020 Tokyo	400 m freestyle S10
Silver medal – second place	2024 Paris	200 m medley SM10
Bronze medal – third place	2016 Rio de Janeiro	200 m medley SM10
Bronze medal – third place	2024 Paris	400 m freestyle S10
World Championships
Gold medal – first place	2022 Madeira	400 m freestyle S10
Gold medal – first place	2022 Madeira	100 m backstroke S10
Gold medal – first place	2023 Manchester	400 m freestyle S10
Gold medal – first place	2023 Manchester	200m medley SM10
Gold medal – first place	2023 Manchester	100 m backstroke S10
Silver medal – second place	2022 Madeira	100 m freestyle S10
Silver medal – second place	2025 Singapore	400 m freestyle S10
Bronze medal – third place	2023 Manchester	100 m freestyle S10
Bronze medal – third place	2025 Singapore	100 m backstroke S10
European Championships
Gold medal – first place	2016 Funchal	100 m backstroke S10
Silver medal – second place	2026 Kocaeli	200 m ind. medley SM10
Bronze medal – third place	2014 Eindhoven	100 m backstroke S10
Bronze medal – third place	2016 Funchal	200 m medley SM10
Bronze medal – third place	2016 Funchal	4×100 m freestyle relay 34pts
Bronze medal – third place	2016 Funchal	4×100 m medley relay 34pts

Bianka Pap (born 7 February 2000) is a Hungarian Paralympic swimmer.

== Career ==
At the 2014 IPC Swimming European Championships she won the bronze medal in the women's 100 metre backstroke S10 event.

She competed at the 2016 Summer Paralympics where she won the silver medal in the 100 m backstroke S10 and the bronze medal in the 200 m individual medley SM10.

At the 2018 World Para Swimming European Championships she won the gold medal in the women's 100 metres backstroke S10 event, the silver medal in the women's 400 metres freestyle S10 event and the bronze medal in the women's 200 metres individual medley S10 event.
