= Song Lingling =

Chinese Paralympic swimmer

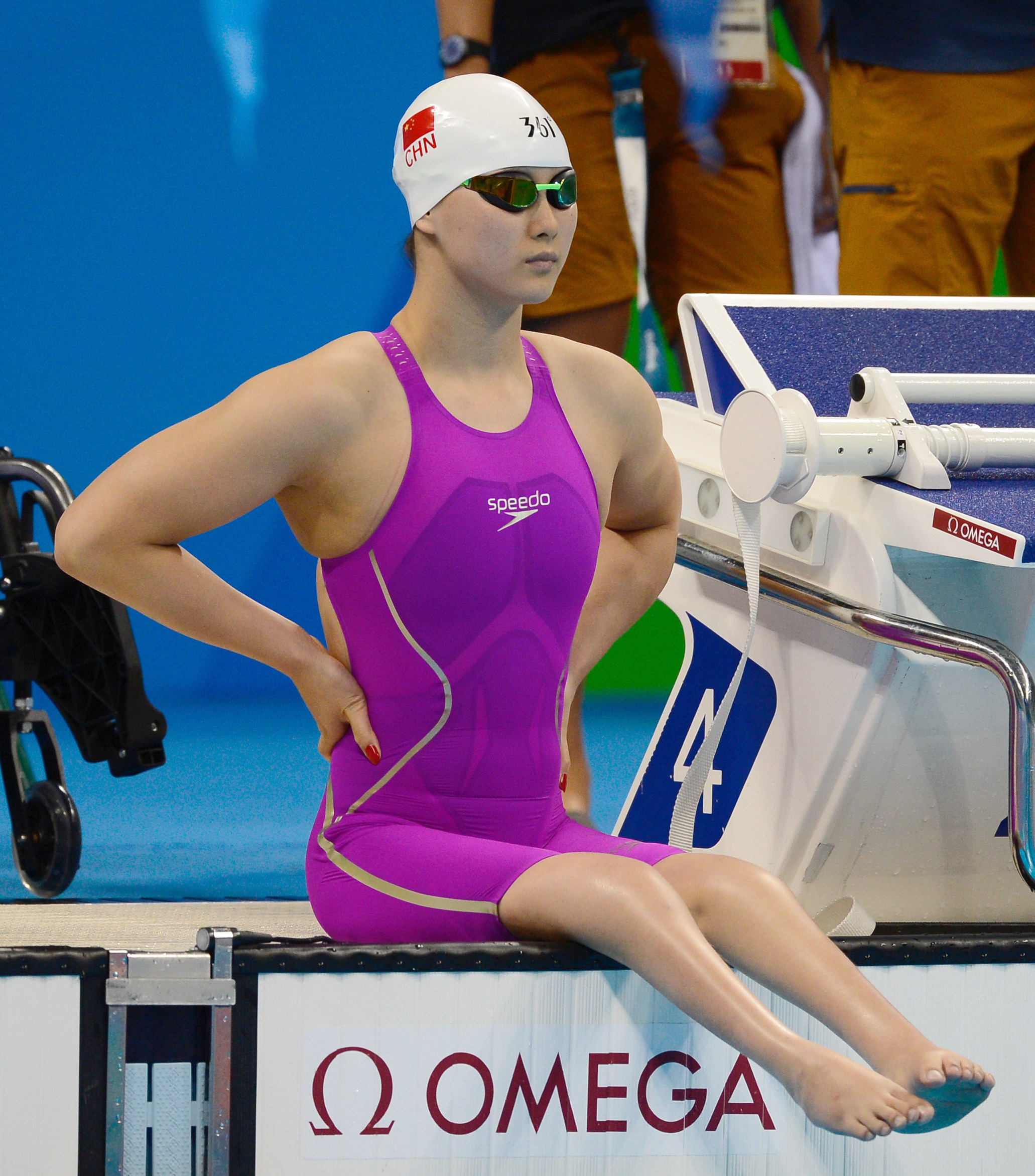
- Song at the 2016 Paralympics

Personal information
- Nationality: Chinese
- Born: 17 January 1996 (age 30) China

Sport
- Sport: Paralympic swimming
- Disability class: S6
- Event(s): Freestyle, breaststroke, backstroke, medley
Medal record
Swimming
Representing China
Paralympic Games
Gold medal – first place	2016 Rio de Janeiro	100 m backstroke S6
Silver medal – second place	2012 London	100 m breaststroke SB5
Silver medal – second place	2016 Rio de Janeiro	400 m backstroke S6
Silver medal – second place	2016 Rio de Janeiro	200m Individual Medley - SM6
Bronze medal – third place	2012 London	400 m freestyle S6
Bronze medal – third place	2016 Rio de Janeiro	100 m breaststroke SB5
Bronze medal – third place	2016 Rio de Janeiro	4x100m Freestyle Relay - 34 Points
IPC Swimming World Championships
Gold medal – first place	2010 Eindhoven	4x50m Freestyle Relay - 20 Points
Gold medal – first place	2017 Mexico City	400 freestyle - S6
Gold medal – first place	2017 Mexico City	100m Backstroke - S6
Gold medal – first place	2017 Mexico City	100m Breaststroke - SB5
Gold medal – first place	2017 Mexico City	200m Individual Medley - SM6
Gold medal – first place	2017 Mexico City	4x50m Freestyle Relay - 20 Points
Gold medal – first place	2019 London	4x50 m Freestyle Relay - 20 Points
Silver medal – second place	2010 Eindhoven	400 freestyle - S6
Silver medal – second place	2019 London	Women's 100m Backstroke - S6
Bronze medal – third place	2010 Eindhoven	100m Freestyle - S6
Bronze medal – third place	2019 London	200m Individual Medley - SM6 - S6
Asian Para Games
Gold medal – first place	2018 Jakarta	400m Freestyle - S7
Gold medal – first place	2018 Jakarta	100 Backstroke - S8
Gold medal – first place	2018 Jakarta	100m Breaststroke - SB6
Gold medal – first place	2018 Jakarta	4x100m Medley Relay - 34 Points
Silver medal – second place	2018 Jakarta	50m Freestyle - S6
Silver medal – second place	2018 Jakarta	100m Freestyle - S6

Song Lingling (born 17 January 1996) is a Chinese Paralympic swimmer competing in the S6 class. She has won two silver and a gold paralympic medal.

== Life ==
Song was born in 1996 and she lost the use of her legs due to polio. She took up swimming in Shenyang in 2009 and her club coach was Li Jianhui. Her swimming hero was Ning Zetao. In 2010 at the IPC Swimming World Championships at Eindhoven in the Netherlands she gained a silver and a bronze medal swimming freestyle and a gold medal in the 4x50m medley. At the 2012 Summer Paralympics in London she won a silver medal in the SB5 100 m backstroke (S6).

At the 2016 Summer Paralympics in Rio she won a gold medal in the 100m backstroke (S6). Her team mate Lu Dong took the silver. In the 200 metres she took another silver medal after being beaten by Ellie Simmonds of Great Britain.

Song was at the World Para Swimming Allianz Championships in 2019 in London. She was the world record holder and she competed in the 100m backstroke S6 and took silver to the gold gained by Verena Schott of Germany.

In 2020 she was at the Paralympic games in Tokyo where she competed in freestyle and breaststroke. She made the finals at several events but did not finish with a medal.

== Honours ==
The world's largest trade union, the All-China Federation of Trade Unions, gave her the National May 1st Labour Medal.
