= 2017 World Para Swimming Championships =

2017 World Para Swimming Championship

- Host city: Mexico City, Mexico
- Date: 2 – 7 December
- Venue: Alberca Olímpica Francisco Márquez
- Nations: 70
- Athletes: 580

The 2017 World Para Swimming Championships was the ninth edition of the World Para Swimming Championships, an international swimming competition for athletes with a disability. It was held in Mexico City, Mexico and took place from 2 to 7 December. Around 304 athletes from around 70 different countries competed at the games, with China topping the tables with most gold medals and medals won. The event was held at the Alberca Olímpica Francisco Márquez located in Mexico City. However, due to safety concerns, both Great Britain and Russia withdrew from the rearranged championships.

== Venue ==
Mexico City (Mexico)

The Championship was staged at the Alberca Olímpica Francisco Márquez located at Mexico City, Mexico.

== Events ==
=== Classification ===
Athletes are allocated a classification for each event based upon their disability to allow fairer competition between athletes of similar ability. The classifications for swimming are:

- Visual impairment
  - S11-S13
- Intellectual impairment
  - S14
- Other disability
  - S1-S10 (Freestyle, backstroke and butterfly)
  - SB1-SB9 (breaststroke)
  - SM1-SM10 (individual medley)

Classifications run from S1 (severely disabled) to S10 (minimally disabled) for athletes with physical disabilities, and S11 (totally blind) to S13 (legally blind) for visually impaired athletes. Blind athletes must use blackened goggles.

=== Schedule ===
Finals

Date →		2 Dec	3 Dec	4 Dec	5 Dec	6 Dec	7 Dec
50 m Freestyle	Men Details	S10		S7 S8	S4; S5; S12; S13	S3	S6; S9; S11
50 m Freestyle	Women Details	S10		S7	S5; S11; S12; S13	S3; S4	S6; S8; S9
100 m Freestyle	Men Details	S1-5; S7; S11	S8; S10	S6; S9			S12; S13
100 m Freestyle	Women Details	S5; S7; S11	S8; S10; S12; S13	S3; S4; S6; S9			
200 m freestyle	Men Details			S3	S14		S2; S4; S5
200 m freestyle	Women Details				S14	S1-5	
400 m freestyle	Men Details	S6	S7; S8; S13		S11		S9; S10
400 m freestyle	Women Details	S6			S11; S13	S7; S8; S9	S10
50m backstroke	Men Details		S3; S4	S1; S2; S5			
50m backstroke	Women Details		S3; S4	S5			
100 m backstroke	Men Details	S8; S9; S10; S12; S13	S11		S6; S7	S14	S1; S2
100 m backstroke	Women Details	S9; S10; S12; S13	S11		S6; S7; S8	S14	
50 m breaststroke	Men Details				SB2; SB2		
50 m breaststroke	Women Details				SB3		
100m breaststroke	Men Details	SB4; SB14	SB5; SB6		SB7; SB8; SB9; SB13	SB11; SB12	
100m breaststroke	Women Details	SB4; SB14	SB5; SB6; SB7		SB8; SB9	SB11; SB12; SB13	
50 m butterfly	Men Details				S7	S6	
50 m butterfly	Women Details		S5		S6; S7		
100m butterfly	Men Details			S11; S12; S13		S8; S9; S10	S14
100m butterfly	Women Details			S12-13		S8; S9; S10	S14
150m medley	Men Details						SM3; SM4
150m medley	Women Details						SM3-4
200m medley	Men Details			SM9; SM10; SM14		SM11; SM13	SM6; SM7; SM8
200m medley	Women Details			SM9; SM10; SM14		SM11; SM13	SM6; SM7; SM8
4×50m freestyle relays	Mixed Details						20pts
4 × 100 m freestyle relays	Men Details	34pts					
4 × 100 m freestyle relays	Women Details		34pts				
4 × 100 m medley relays	Men Details					34pts	
4 × 100 m medley relays	Women Details						34pts

== Medal table ==
The medal table at the end of the championship. Host nation (Mexico)

Rank	Nation	Gold	Silver	Bronze	Total
1	China (CHN)	30	16	10	56
2	United States (USA)	21	20	13	54
3	Italy (ITA)	20	10	8	38
4	Brazil (BRA)	18	9	9	36
5	Belarus (BLR)	11	7	2	20
6	Spain (ESP)	10	16	19	45
7	Colombia (COL)	9	2	2	13
8	Mexico (MEX)*	6	14	14	34
9	Germany (GER)	4	6	2	12
10	Poland (POL)	3	4	3	10
11	Norway (NOR)	3	3	3	9
12	Greece (GRE)	2	7	10	19
13	South Korea (KOR)	2	4	1	7
14	Sweden (SWE)	2	3	3	8
15	Kazakhstan (KAZ)	2	3	1	6
16	Czech Republic (CZE)	2	2	4	8
17	Argentina (ARG)	1	4	5	10
18	France (FRA)	1	3	1	5
19	Iceland (ISL)	1	2	2	5
20	Hungary (HUN)	1	1	4	6
21	Finland (FIN)	1	1	1	3
22	Cuba (CUB)	1	1	0	2
23	Lithuania (LTU)	1	0	2	3
24	Turkey (TUR)	1	0	1	2
25	Austria (AUT)	1	0	0	1
25	Cyprus (CYP)	1	0	0	1
25	India (IND)	1	0	0	1
28	Vietnam (VIE)	0	4	2	6
29	South Africa (RSA)	0	3	1	4
30	Egypt (EGY)	0	1	2	3
30	Estonia (EST)	0	1	2	3
30	Slovakia (SVK)	0	1	2	3
33	Independent Para Athlete	0	1	0	1
33	Portugal (POR)	0	1	0	1
35	Chile (CHI)	0	0	4	4
35	Israel (ISR)	0	0	4	4
37	Belgium (BEL)	0	0	3	3
38	Croatia (CRO)	0	0	2	2
39	Ecuador (ECU)	0	0	1	1
39	Kenya (KEN)	0	0	1	1
Totals (40 entries)		156	150	144	450

=== Multiple medallists ===
Many competitors won multiple medals at the 2017 Championships. The following athletes won five gold medals or more.

Name	Country	Medal	Event
Jessica Long	United States	Gold; Gold; Gold; Gold; Gold; Gold; Gold; Gold	100m Backstroke S8; 100m Breaststroke SB7; 100m Butterfly S8; 100m Freestyle S8; 200m Individual Medley SM8; 400m Freestyle S8; 4 × 100 m Freestyle Relay 34pts 4 × 100 m Medley Relay 34pts
André Brasil	Brazil	Gold; Gold; Gold; Gold; Gold; Gold; Gold; Silver	100m Backstroke S10; 100m Butterfly S10; 100m Freestyle S10; 200m Individual Medley SM10; 400m Freestyle S10; 4 × 100 m Freestyle Relay 34pts 4 × 100 m Medley Relay 34pts 50m Freestyle S10
Ihar Boki	Belarus	Gold; Gold; Gold; Gold; Gold; Gold; Silver	100m Backstroke S13; 100m Breaststroke SB13; 100m Butterfly S13; 100m Freestyle S13; 200m Indiv. Medley SM13; 400m Freestyle S13; 50m Freestyle S13
Haijiao Xu	China	Gold; Gold; Gold; Gold; Gold; Gold; Silver	100m Butterfly S8; 100m Freestyle S8; 200m Individual Medley SM8; 400m Freestyle S8; 50m Freestyle S8; 4x50m Freestyle Relay 20pts 100m Breaststroke SB8
Daniel Dias	Brazil	Gold; Gold; Gold; Gold; Gold; Gold	100m Freestyle S1-5; 200m Freestyle S5; 4 × 100 m Freestyle Relay 34pts 4 × 100 m Medley Relay 34pts 50m Backstroke S5; 50m Freestyle S5
Carlotta Gilli	Italy	Gold; Gold; Gold; Gold; Gold; Silver	100m Backstroke S13; 100m Butterfly S12-13; 100m Freestyle S13; 200m Indiv. Medley SM13; 50m Freestyle S13; 400m Freestyle S13
Wenpan Juang	China	Gold; Gold; Gold; Gold; Gold; Bronze	150m Individual Medley SM3; 150m Individual Medley SM3; 50m Breaststroke SB2; 50m Freestyle S3; 4x50m Freestyle Relay 20pts 50m Backstroke S3
Carlos Serrano Zárate	Colombia	Gold; Gold; Gold; Gold; Gold; Bronze	100m Breaststroke SB7; 100m Freestyle S7; 200m Individual Medley SM7; 50m Butterfly S7; 50m Freestyle S7; 400m Freestyle S7
Lingling Song	China	Gold; Gold; Gold; Gold; Gold	4x50m Freestyle Relay 20pts 100m Backstroke S6; 100m Breaststroke SB5; 200m Individual Medley SM6; 400m Freestyle S6

== Records ==
Multiple world and continental records were broken during the competition. The below table lists the number of records broken by country.

Legend

WR: World record, CR: Championship record, AF: Africa record, AM: Americas record, AS: Asian record, EU: European record, OS: Oceania record

New Records
Nation	WR	CR	AF	AM	AS	EU	OC
Australia	3						19
Belarus	4						
Brazil	1	4		5			
Canada		1		7			
China	3	4			17		
Colombia	1			4			
Egypt			1				
Kazakhstan		1					
Italy		1				2	
Indonesia					1		
Israel		1					
Japan		3					
Germany		1					
Great Britain	2	2				6	
Greece		1					
Mexico	1	1		5			
Mauritius		1					
Netherlands	4	1					
Norway		2					
New Zealand		4					3
Poland						1	
Russia	10	4					
South Africa		1	5				
South Korea		2					
Sweden	1						
United States	3	5					
Ukraine	3	5				5	
Uzbekistan					5		
Vietnam					2		
Total	36	44	6	21	25	14	22

== Footnotes ==
Notes
