= 2025 World Para Swimming Championships – Women's 50 metre backstroke =

The Women's 50 m backstroke events at the 2025 World Para Swimming Championships will be held at the Singapore Aquatic Centre between 21 and 27 September 2025.

== Schedule ==
Women's 50 m backstroke events will be held across the following schedule:

women's 50 metre backstroke
Day	Date	Classifications
Day 1	21 Sept	
Day 2	22 Sept	S5
Day 3	23 Sept	
Day 4	24 Sept	S3; S4
Day 5	25 Sept	
Day 6	26 Sept	S2
Day 7	27 Sept	

== Medal summary ==
Event	Gold	Silver	Bronze
S2; Details	Yip Pin Xiu; Singapore	Diana Koltsova; Individual Neutral Athletes	Arjola Trimi; Italy
S3; Details	Ellie Challis; Great Britain	Leanne Smith; United States	Marta Fernández Infante; Spain
S4; Details	Katie Kubiak; United States	Anastasiia Goncharova; Individual Neutral Athletes	Lídia Vieira da Cruz; Brazil
S5; Details	He Shenggao; China	Sevilay Ozturk; Turkey	Sumeyye Boyaci; Turkey

== Race summaries ==
=== S2 ===
The women's 50 metre backstroke S2 event was held on 26 September. Twelve swimmers took part, with the top eight proceeding to the final.

The relevant records at the beginning of the event were as follows:

Record	Athlete	Time	City	Country
World	Pin Xiu Yip (SGP)	0:59.38	Rio de Janeiro	Brazil
Championship	Ganna Ielisavetska (UKR)	1:03.21	Montreal	Canada
Americas	Haidee Viviana Aceves Perez (MEX)	01:08.7	Paris	France
Asian	Pin Xiu Yip (SGP)	00:59.4	Rio de Janeiro	Brazil
European	Ganna Ielisavetska (UKR)	01:03.2	Montreal	Canada

==== Heats ====
Rank	Heat	Lane	Athlete	Class	Result	Notes
1	2	4	Pin Xiu Yip (SGP)	S2	1:09.58	Q
2	1	5	Angela Procida (ITA)	S2	1:10.89	Q
3	2	3	Fabiola Ramirez Martinez (MEX)	S2	1:10.94	Q
4	1	4	Arjola Trimi (ITA)	S2	1:11.40	Q
5	2	5	Haidee Viviana Aceves Perez (MEX)	S2	1:12.02	Q
6	2	6	Diana Koltsova (AIN)	S2	1:12.31	Q
7	1	6	Katarina Draganov-Cordas (SRB)	S2	1:30.23	Q
8	1	2	Ebrar Bilge (TUR)	S2	1:35.70	Q
9	2	2	Zsanett Adami-Rozsa (HUN)	S2	1:38.06	
10	2	7	Elif Ildem (TUR)	S1	1:40.26	
11	1	7	Areti Aravela Spyridou (GRE)	S2	1:52.43	

==== Final ====
Rank	Lane	Athlete	Class	Result	Notes
1st place, gold medalist(s)	4	Pin Xiu Yip (SGP)	S2	1:04.31	
2nd place, silver medalist(s)	7	Diana Koltsova (AIN)	S2	1:05.72	
3rd place, bronze medalist(s)	6	Arjola Trimi (ITA)	S2	1:05.83	
4	5	Angela Procida (ITA)	S2	1:09.05	
5	3	Fabiola Ramirez Martinez (MEX)	S2	1:09.67	
6	2	Haidee Viviana Aceves Perez (MEX)	S2	1:12.68	
7	1	Katarina Draganov-Cordas (SRB)	S2	1:30.89	
8	8	Ebrar Bilge (TUR)	S2	1:33.29	

=== S3 ===
The women's 50 metre backstroke S3 event was held on 24 September. Twelve swimmers took part, with the top eight proceeding to the final.

The relevant records at the beginning of the event were as follows:

Record	Athlete	Time	City	Country
World	Peng Qiuping (CHN)	0:48.49	Rio de Janeiro	Brazil
Championship	Lisette Teunissen (NED)	0:51.23	Glasgow	United Kingdom
African	Sarah Shannon (RSA)	01:17.6	Eindhoven	Netherlands
Americas	Leanne Smith (USA)	00:53.9	Indianapolis	United States
Asian	Peng Qiuping (CHN)	00:48.5	Rio de Janeiro	Brazil
European	Lisette Teunissen (NED)	00:50.3	Amsterdam	Netherlands
Oceania	Esther Overton (AUS)	01:11.3	Eindhoven	Netherlands

==== Heats ====
Rank	Heat	Lane	Athlete	Class	Result	Notes
1	2	4	Ellie Challis (GBR)	S3	55.05	Q
2	2	3	Leanne Smith (USA)	S3	57.99	Q
3	1	4	Marta Fernandez Infante (ESP)	S3	58.91	Q
4	2	5	Zoia Shchurova (AIN)	S3	59.34	Q
5	1	5	Domiziana Mecenate (ITA)	S3	1:00.10	Q
6	1	3	Maiara Barreto (BRA)	S3	1:07.18	Q
7	1	6	Sonja Sigurdardottir (ISL)	S3	1:10.60	Q
8	2	7	Anhelina Maltseva (UKR)	S3	1:11.24	Q
9	2	6	Wiktoria Sobota (POL)	S3	1:11.60	
10	1	2	Veronika Guirenko (ISR)	S3	1:02.00	
11	2	2	Aly van Wyck-Smart (CAN)	S3	1:14.13	
12	1	7	Lova Johansson (SWE)	S3	2:06.10	

==== Final ====
Rank	Lane	Athlete	Class	Result	Notes
1st place, gold medalist(s)	4	Ellie Challis (GBR)	S3	53.92	
2nd place, silver medalist(s)	5	Leanne Smith (USA)	S3	53.92	
3rd place, bronze medalist(s)	3	Marta Fernandez Infante (ESP)	S3	53.92	
4	6	Zoia Shchurova (AIN)	S3	58.27	
5	2	Domiziana Mecenate (ITA)	S3	59.64	
6	7	Maiara Barreto (BRA)	S3	1:04.03	
7	1	Sonja Sigurdardottir (ISL)	S3	1:09.93	
8	8	Anhelina Maltseva (UKR)	S3	1:12.68	

=== S4 ===
The women's 50 metre backstroke S4 event was held on 24 September. Thirteen swimmers took part, with the top eight proceeding to the final.

The relevant records at the beginning of the event were as follows:

Record	Athlete	Time	City	Country
World	Liu Yu (CHN)	0:44.68	Tokyo	Japan
Championship	Cheng Jiao (CHN)	0:46.51	Mexico City	Mexico
African	Kat Swanepoel (RSA)	00:48.0	Manchester	United Kingdom
Americas	Lídia Vieira da Cruz (BRA)	00:51.0	Lignano Sabbiadoro	Italy
Asian	Yu Liu (CHN)	00:44.7	Tokyo	Japan
European	Monica Boggioni (ITA)	00:46.9	Mexico City	Mexico
Oceania	Rachael Watson (AUS)	01:09.2	Rio de Janeiro	Brazil

==== Heats ====
Rank	Heat	Lane	Athlete	Class	Result	Notes
1	2	4	Katie Kubiak (USA)	S4	44.13	Q, WR
2	2	3	Lídia Vieira da Cruz (BRA)	S4	50.71	Q
3	1	6	Maryna Verbova (UKR)	S4	51.11	Q
4	2	5	Mira Larionova (AIN)	S4	51.16	Q
5	1	4	Anastasiia Goncharova (AIN)	S4	51.65	Q
6	1	5	Gina Boettcher (GER)	S4	53.48	Q
7	1	3	Hanna Polishchuk (UKR)	S4	54.61	Q
8	2	2	Tanja Scholz (GER)	S4	54.97	Q
9	2	6	Yuliia Safonova (UKR)	S4	56.15	
10	1	2	Nataliia Butkova (AIN)	S4	56.83	
11	1	7	Brenda Anellia Larry (MAS)	S4	59.36	
12	2	7	Jordan Tucker (CAN)	S4	1:02.99	
13	2	1	Monique Schacher (SUI)	S4	1:07.23	

==== Final ====
Rank	Lane	Athlete	Class	Result	Notes
1st place, gold medalist(s)	4	Katie Kubiak (USA)	S4	42.66	WR
2nd place, silver medalist(s)	2	Anastasiia Goncharova (AIN)	S4	49.27	
3rd place, bronze medalist(s)	5	Lídia Vieira da Cruz (BRA)	S4	50.51	
4	6	Mira Larionova (AIN)	S4	50.60	
5	3	Maryna Verbova (UKR)	S4	51.54	
6	7	Gina Boettcher (GER)	S4	51.70	
7	8	Tanja Scholz (GER)	S4	52.01	
8	1	Hanna Polishchuk (UKR)	S4	55.46	

=== S5 ===
The women's 50 metre backstroke S5 event will be held on 22 September. Nine swimmers will take part, with the top eight proceeding to the final.

The relevant records at the beginning of the event were as follows:

Record	Athlete	Time	City	Country
World	Lu Dong (CHN)	0:37.18	Tokyo	Japan
Championship	Lu Dong (CHN)	0:38.21	Manchester	United Kingdom
African	Kat Swanepoel (RSA)	00:49.6	Paris	France
Americas	Mariana Guerrero Martinez (COL)	00:45.6	Manchester	United Kingdom
Asian	Lu Dong (CHN)	00:37.2	Tokyo	Japan
European	Natalia Ziani (UKR)	00:38.7	Eindhoven	Netherlands
Oceania	Sarah Hilt (AUS)	01:02.5	Colorado Springs	United States

==== Heats ====
Rank	Heat	Lane	Athlete	Class	Result	Notes
1	1	4	He Shenggao (CHN)	S5	42.01	Q
2	1	5	Sevilay Ozturk (TUR)	S5	43.93	Q
3	1	6	Angel Mae Otom (PHI)	S5	45.11	Q
4	1	3	Sumeyye Boyaci (TUR)	S5	46.16	Q
5	1	2	Monica Boggioni (ITA)	S5	47.13	Q
6	1	7	Wilasini Wongnonthaphoom (THA)	S5	47.58	Q
7	1	1	Karina Amayrany (MEX)	S5	51.53	Q
8	1	8	Elizabeth Noriega (ARG)	S5	51.66	Q
9	1	0	Natalie Ornkvist (FIN)	S5	54.50	

==== Final ====
Rank	Lane	Athlete	Class	Result	Notes
1st place, gold medalist(s)	4	He Shenggao (CHN)	S5	39.72	
2nd place, silver medalist(s)	5	Sevilay Ozturk (TUR)	S5	43.75	
3rd place, bronze medalist(s)	6	Sumeyye Boyaci (TUR)	S5	44.87	
4	3	Angel Mae Otom (PHI)	S5	45.60	
5	2	Monica Boggioni (ITA)	S5	46.73	
6	7	Wilasini Wongnonthaphoom (THA)	S5	49.13	
7	1	Karina Amayrany (MEX)	S5	50.70	
8	8	Elizabeth Noriega (ARG)	S5	52.11	
