= 2023 World Para Swimming Championships – Women's 50 metre backstroke =

The women's 50m backstroke events at the 2023 World Para Swimming Championships were held at the Manchester Aquatics Centre between 31 July and 6 August.

== Medalists ==
Event	Gold	Silver	Bronze
S2	Yip Pin Xiu; Singapore	Angela Procida; Italy	Fabiola Ramírez Martínez; Mexico
S3	Ellie Challis; Great Britain	Edênia Garcia; Brazil	Susana Schnarndorf; Brazil
S4	Kat Swanepoel; South Africa	Tanja Scholz; Germany	Gina Böttcher; Germany
S5	Lu Dong; China	He Shenggao; China	Sumeyye Boyaci; Turkey

== Results ==
=== S3 ===
Final

The final took place on 3 August.

Rank	Heat	Lane	Name	Nation	Result	Notes
1st place, gold medalist(s)	1	4	Ellie Challis	Great Britain	54.9	
2nd place, silver medalist(s)	1	5	Edênia Garcia	Brazil	1:01.38	
3rd place, bronze medalist(s)	1	6	Susana Schnarndorf	Brazil	1:01.81	
4	1	3	Maiara Barreto	Brazil	1:04.26	
5	1	2	Sonja Sigurdardottir	Iceland	1:07.82	
6	1	7	Nikita Ens	Canada	1:14.53	
7	1	8	Veronika Guirenko	Israel	1:15.06	
8	1	1	Aly Van Wyck-Smart	Canada	1:16.13	
