= 2022 World Para Swimming Championships – Women's 50 metre backstroke =

The women's 50m backstroke events at the 2022 World Para Swimming Championships were held at the Penteada Olympic Swimming Complex in Madeira between 12 and 18 June.

== Medalists ==
Event	Gold	Silver	Bronze
S2	Yip Pin Xiu; Singapore	Angela Procida; Italy	Fabiola Ramírez Martínez; Mexico
S3	Leanne Smith; United States	Ellie Challis; Great Britain	Maiara Barreto; Brazil
S4	Alexandra Stamatopoulou; Greece	Tanja Scholz; Germany	Kat Swanepoel; South Africa
S5	Sümeyye Boyacı; Turkey	Sevilay Öztürk; Turkey	Monica Boggioni; Italy

== Results ==
=== S3 ===
Final

Eight swimmers from six nations took part.

Rank	Name	Nation	Result	Notes
1st place, gold medalist(s)	Leanne Smith	United States	55.08	
2nd place, silver medalist(s)	Ellie Challis	United Kingdom	57.43	
3rd place, bronze medalist(s)	Maiara Barreto	Brazil	1:02.98	
4	Nikita Ens	Canada	1:08.70	
5	Haidee Viviana Aceves Perez	Mexico	1:10.32	
6	Patricia Valle	Mexico	1:11.50	
7	Veronika Guirenko	Israel	1:14.67	
8	Aly van Wyck-Smart	Canada	1:16.67	

=== S4 ===
Final

Seven swimmers from seven nations took part.

Rank	Name	Nation	Result	Notes
1st place, gold medalist(s)	Alexandra Stamatopoulou	Greece	49.97	
2nd place, silver medalist(s)	Tanja Scholz	Germany	51.05	
3rd place, bronze medalist(s)	Kat Swanepoel	South Africa	51.80	
4	Lidia Vieira da Cruz	Brazil	54.02	
5	Sonja Sigurðardóttir	Iceland	1:07.31	
6	Dominika Mickova	Czech Republic	1:09.74	
7	Jordan Tucker	Canada	1:11.65	

=== S5 ===
Final

Eight swimmers from seven nations took part.

Rank	Name	Nation	Result	Notes
1st place, gold medalist(s)	Sümeyye Boyacı	Turkey	41.58	
2nd place, silver medalist(s)	Sevilay Öztürk	Turkey	44.45	
3rd place, bronze medalist(s)	Monica Boggioni	Italy	46.32	
4	Karina Amayrani Hernandez Torres	Mexico	50.00	
5	Solène Sache	France	51.57	
6	Elizabeth Noriega	Argentina	51.70	
7	Darlin Jiseb Romero Sanchez	Colombia	52.95	
8	Clémence Paré	Canada	1:03.51	
