= Swimming at the 2020 Summer Paralympics – Women's 50 metre backstroke S3 =

Women's 50 metre backstroke S3 at the XVI Paralympic Games
- Venue: Tokyo Aquatics Centre
- Dates: 29 August 2021
- Competitors: 12 from 8 nations

Medalists
1st place, gold medalist(s)		Arjola Trimi	Italy
2nd place, silver medalist(s)		Ellie Challis	Great Britain
3rd place, bronze medalist(s)		Iuliia Shishova	RPC

The Women's 50 metre backstroke S3 event at the 2020 Paralympic Games took place on 29 August 2021, at the Tokyo Aquatics Centre.

== Heats ==
The swimmers with the top eight times, regardless of heat, advanced to the final.

Rank	Heat	Lane	Name	Nationality	Time	Notes
1	1	4	Arjola Trimi	Italy	54.79	Q
2	2	5	Ellie Challis	Great Britain	55.68	Q
3	2	3	Iuliia Shishova	RPC	56.89	Q
4	1	3	Zoya Shchurova	RPC	59.60	Q
5	2	6	Maiara Barreto	Brazil	1:00.80	Q
6	2	4	Leanne Smith	United States	1:01.11	Q
7	1	5	Edênia Garcia	Brazil	1:08.44	Q
8	1	6	Haideé Aceves	Mexico	1:08.48	Q
9	2	7	Nikita Ens	Canada	1:10.82	
10	1	2	Veronika Guirenko	Israel	1:11.78	
11	1	7	Patricia Valle	Mexico	1:13.89	
12	2	2	Aly Van Wyck-Smart	Canada	1:23.30	

== Final ==
50m backstroke final
Rank	Lane	Name	Nationality	Time	Notes
1st place, gold medalist(s)	4	Arjola Trimi	Italy	51.34	
2nd place, silver medalist(s)	5	Ellie Challis	Great Britain	55.11	
3rd place, bronze medalist(s)	3	Iuliia Shishova	RPC	57.03	
4	2	Maiara Barreto	Brazil	59.50	
5	6	Zoya Shchurova	RPC	1:00.25	
6	7	Leanne Smith	United States	1:02.93	
7	8	Haideé Aceves	Mexico	1:07.66	
8	1	Edênia Garcia	Brazil	1:07.83	
