= Swimming at the 2020 Summer Paralympics – Women's 50 metre backstroke =

The Women's 50 metre backstroke swimming events for the 2020 Summer Paralympics took place at the Tokyo Aquatics Centre from August 29 to September 3, 2021. A total of four events were contested over this distance.

== Schedule ==
H	Heats	½	Semifinals	F	Final

Date	Sun 29		Mon 30		Tue 31		Wed 1		Thu 2		Fri 3	
Event	M	E	M	E	M	E	M	E	M	E	M	E
S2 50m									H	F		
S3 50m	H	F										
S4 50m											H	F
S5 50m			H	F								

== Medal summary ==
The following is a summary of the medals awarded across all 50 metre backstroke events.

Classification	Gold		Silver		Bronze	
S2	Yip Pin Xiu; Singapore	1:02.04	Miyuki Yamada; Japan	1:06.98	Feng Yazhu; China	1:11.55
S3	Arjola Trimi; Italy	51.34	Ellie Challis; Great Britain	55.11	Iuliia Shishova; RPC	57.03
S4	Liu Yu; China	44.68 WR	Zhou Yanfei; China	48.42	Alexandra Stamatopoulou; Greece	49.63
S5	Lu Dong; China	37.18	Teresa Perales; Spain	43.02	Sevilay Öztürk; Turkey	43.48

== Results ==
The following were the results of the finals only of each of the Women's 50 metre backstroke events in each of the classifications. Further details of each event, including where appropriate heats and semi finals results, are available on that event's dedicated page.

=== S2 ===
The S2 category is for swimmers who may have limited function in their hands, trunk, and legs, and mainly rely on their arms to swim.

The final in this classification took place on 2 September 2021:

Rank	Lane	Name	Nationality	Time	Notes
1st place, gold medalist(s)	4	Yip Pin Xiu	Singapore	1:02.04	
2nd place, silver medalist(s)	5	Miyuki Yamada	Japan	1:06.98	
3rd place, bronze medalist(s)	7	Feng Yazhu	China	1:11.55	
4	3	Fabiola Ramirez	Mexico	1:12.66	
5	2	Angela Procida	Italy	1:12.69	
6	6	Veronika Medchainova	RPC	1:14.59	
7	1	Zsanett Adami	Hungary	1:27.48	
8	8	Elif Ildem	Turkey	1:32.49	

=== S3 ===
The S3 category is for swimmers who have leg or arm amputations, have severe coordination problems in their limbs, or have to swim with their arms but don't use their trunk or legs.

The final in this classification took place on 29 August 2021:

Rank	Lane	Name	Nationality	Time	Notes
1st place, gold medalist(s)	4	Arjola Trimi	Italy	51.34	
2nd place, silver medalist(s)	5	Ellie Challis	Great Britain	55.11	
3rd place, bronze medalist(s)	3	Iuliia Shishova	RPC	57.03	
4	2	Maiara Regina Pereira Barreto	Brazil	59.50	
5	6	Zoya Shchurova	RPC	1:00.25	
6	7	Leanne Smith	United States	1:02.93	
7	8	Haidee Viviana Aceves Perez	Mexico	1:07.66	
8	1	Edênia Garcia	Brazil	1:07.83	

=== S4 ===
The S4 category is for swimmers who have function in their hands and arms but can't use their trunk or legs to swim, or they have three amputated limbs.

The final in this classification took place on 3 September 2021:

Rank	Lane	Name	Nationality	Time	Notes
1st place, gold medalist(s)	4	Liu Yu	China	44.68	WR
2nd place, silver medalist(s)	3	Zhou Yanfei	China	48.42	
3rd place, bronze medalist(s)	5	Alexandra Stamatopoulou	Greece	49.63	
4	6	Kat Swanepoel	South Africa	50.17	
5	2	Maryna Verbova	Ukraine	53.24	
6	7	Gina Böttcher	Germany	53.96	
7	8	Olga Sviderska	Ukraine	55.09	
8	1	Nataliia Butkova	RPC	55.18	

=== S5 ===
The S5 category is for swimmers who have hemiplegia, paraplegia or short stature.

The final in this classification took place on 30 August 2021:

Rank	Lane	Name	Nationality	Time	Notes
1st place, gold medalist(s)	4	Lu Dong	China	37.18	WR
2nd place, silver medalist(s)	6	Teresa Perales	Spain	43.02	
3rd place, bronze medalist(s)	3	Sevilay Öztürk	Turkey	43.48	
4	5	Sümeyye Boyacı	Turkey	43.94	
5	2	Monica Boggioni	Italy	45.46	
6	8	Mayumi Narita	Japan	47.86	
7	1	Li Zhang	China	48.02	
8	7	Cheng Jiao	China	48.75	
