= Swimming at the 2020 Summer Paralympics – Women's 100 metre freestyle S3 =

Women's 100 metre freestyle S3 at the XVI Paralympic Games
- Venue: Tokyo Aquatics Centre
- Dates: 30 August 2021
- Competitors: 16 from 9 nations

Medalists
1st place, gold medalist(s)		Arjola Trimi	Italy
2nd place, silver medalist(s)		Leanne Smith	United States
3rd place, bronze medalist(s)		Iuliia Shishova	RPC

The Women's 100 metre freestyle S3 event at the 2020 Paralympic Games took place on 30 August 2021, at the Tokyo Aquatics Centre.

== Heats ==
The swimmers with the top eight times, regardless of heat, advanced to the final.

Rank	Heat	Lane	Name	Nationality	Time	Notes
1	1	4	Leanne Smith	United States	1:42.01	Q
2	2	4	Arjola Trimi	Italy	1:45.41	Q
3	1	5	Iuliia Shishova	RPC	1:50.72	Q
4	2	3	Ellie Challis	Great Britain	1:53.63	Q
5	1	3	Zoya Shchurova	RPC	2:08.56	Q
6	2	3	Patricia Valle	Mexico	2:11.21	Q
7	1	6	Maiara Barreto	Brazil	2:12.02	Q
8	2	2	Haideé Aceves	Mexico	2:23.34	Q
9	1	7	Nikita Ens	Canada	2:32.26	
10	2	1	Fabiola Ramírez	Mexico	2:32.47	
11	2	7	Veronika Guirenko	Israel	2:37.00	
12	2	8	Angela Procida	Italy	2:42.37	
13	2	8	Veronika Medchainova	RPC	2:47.96	
14	1	2	Aly Van Wyck-Smart	Canada	2:49.59	
15	1	8	Elif İldem	Turkey	3:17.54	PR
	2	6	Edênia Garcia	Brazil	DNS	

== Final ==
100m freestyle final
Rank	Lane	Name	Nationality	Time	Notes
1st place, gold medalist(s)	5	Arjola Trimi	Italy	1:30.22	ER
2nd place, silver medalist(s)	4	Leanne Smith	United States	1:37.68	
3rd place, bronze medalist(s)	3	Iuliia Shishova	RPC	1:49.63	
4	6	Ellie Challis	Great Britain	1:54.84	
5	2	Zoya Shchurova	RPC	2:07.69	
6	7	Patricia Valle	Mexico	2:08.10	
7	1	Maiara Barreto	Brazil	2:10.90	
8	8	Haideé Aceves	Mexico	2:22.60	
