= 2023 World Para Swimming Championships – Women's 50 metre breaststroke =

The women's 50m breaststroke events at the 2023 World Para Swimming Championships were held at the Manchester Aquatics Centre between 31 July and 6 August.

== Medalists ==
Event	Gold	Silver	Bronze
SB2	Ellie Challis; Great Britain	Tanja Scholz; Germany	Veronika Guirenko; Israel
SB3	Monica Boggioni; Italy	Kat Swanepoel; South Africa	Marta Fernández Infante; Spain

== Results ==
=== SB2 ===
Final

Seven swimmers from six nations took part.

Rank	Name	Nation	Result	Notes
1st place, gold medalist(s)	Ellie Challis	United Kingdom	1:05.72	
2nd place, silver medalist(s)	Tanja Scholz	Germany	1:07.74	
3rd place, bronze medalist(s)	Veronika Guirenko	Israel	1:21.31	
4	Angela Procida	Italy	1:37.74	CR
5	Nikita Ens	Canada	1:38.73	
6	Teresa Perales	Spain	1:41.00	
7	Aly van Wyck-Smart	Canada	1:42.61	

=== SB3 ===
Final

Eight swimmers from seven nations took part.

Rank	Name	Nation	Result	Notes
1st place, gold medalist(s)	Monica Boggioni	Italy	55.55	
2nd place, silver medalist(s)	Kat Swanepoel	South Africa	57.19	AF
3rd place, bronze medalist(s)	Marta Fernández Infante	Spain	58.83	
4	Patrícia Pereira dos Santos	Brazil	59.15	
5	Maryna Verbova	Ukraine	1:00.66	
6	Patricia Valle	Mexico	1:07.34	
7	Nely Miranda	Mexico	1:07.44	
8	Leanne Smith	United States	1:08.88	
