= 2022 World Para Swimming Championships – Women's 50 metre freestyle =

The women's 50m freestyle events at the 2022 World Para Swimming Championships were held at the Penteada Olympic Swimming Complex in Madeira between 12–18 June.

== Medalists ==
Event	Gold	Silver	Bronze
S3	Leanne Smith; United States	Ellie Challis; Great Britain	Patricia Valle; Mexico
S4	Tanja Scholz; Germany	Rachael Watson; Australia	Lidia Vieira da Cruz; Brazil
S5	Tully Kearney; Great Britain	Joana Neves; Brazil	Monica Boggioni; Italy
S6	Anna Hontar; Ukraine	Sara Vargas Blanco; Colombia	Ellie Marks; United States
S7	McKenzie Coan; United States	Giulia Terzi; Italy	Denise Grahl; Germany
S8	Cecília Jerônimo de Araújo; Brazil	Xenia Palazzo; Italy	Kateryna Denysenko; Ukraine
S9	Mariana Ribeiro; Brazil	Susana Veiga; Portugal	Sarai Gascón Moreno; Spain
S10	Aurélie Rivard; Canada	María Barrera Zapata; Colombia	Jasmine Greenwood; Australia
S11	Karolina Pelendritou; Cyprus	Liesette Bruinsma; Netherlands	Tatiana Blattnerová; Slovakia
S12	Maria Carolina Gomes Santiago; Brazil	Hannah Russell; Great Britain	Lucilene da Silva Sousa; Brazil
S13	Katja Dedekind; Australia	Gia Pergolini; United States of America	Ayano Tsujiuchi; Japan

== Results ==
=== S5 ===
Heats

12 swimmers from ten nations took part. The swimmers with the top eight times, regardless of heat, advanced to the final.

Rank	Heat	Lane	Name	Nation	Result	Notes
1	1	4	Joana Neves	Brazil	37.55	Q
2	1	4	Tully Kearney	United Kingdom	38.46	Q
3	2	5	Monica Boggioni	Italy	39.21	Q
4	1	5	Sümeyye Boyacı	Turkey	42.66	Q
5	2	3	Elizabeth Noriega	Argentina	45.33	Q
6	1	3	Sevilay Öztürk	Turkey	45.86	Q
7	2	6	Jessica Tinney	Canada	47.87	Q
8	2	2	Solène Sache	France	48.83	Q
9	1	6	Karina Amayrani Hernández Torres	Mexico	49.86	
10	2	7	Dunia Felices	Peru	51.85	
11	1	7	Clémence Paré	Canada	52.07	
12	1	2	Darlin Romero	Colombia	53.45	

Final

The final was held on 12 June 2022.

Rank	Athlete	Nation	Result	Notes
1st place, gold medalist(s)	Tully Kearney	United Kingdom	34.07	WR
2nd place, silver medalist(s)	Joana Neves	Brazil	37.14	
3rd place, bronze medalist(s)	Monica Boggioni	Italy	39.40	
4	Sevilay Öztürk	Turkey	43.06	
5	Sümeyye Boyacı	Turkey	44.70	
6	Elizabeth Noriega	Argentina	44.78	
7	Jessica Tinney	Canada	46.92	
8	Solène Sache	France	49.06	

=== S10 ===
12 swimmers from 11 nations took part. The swimmers with the top eight times, regardless of heat, advanced to the final.

Rank	Heat	Lane	Name	Nation	Result	Notes
1	2	4	Aurélie Rivard	Canada	27.63	Q
2	2	5	María Barrera Zapata	Colombia	28.50	Q
3	1	4	Alessia Scortechini	Italy	29.00	Q
4	1	2	Jasmine Greenwood	Australia	29.05	Q
5	1	3	Arianna Hunsicker	Canada	29.24	Q
6	2	3	Susannah Kaul	Estonia	29.29	Q
7	1	5	Zara Mullooly	United Kingdom	29.47	Q
8	2	2	Audrey Kim	United States	29.55	Q
9	2	6	Emeline Pierre	France	29.81	
10	1	6	Jenna Rajahalme	Finland	29.87	
11	2	7	Oliwia Jabłońska	Poland	30.28	
12	1	7	Stefanny Rubi Cristino Zapata	Mexico	30.52	

Final

The final was held on 12 June 2022.

Rank	Athlete	Nation	Result	Notes
1st place, gold medalist(s)	Aurélie Rivard	Canada	27.65	
2nd place, silver medalist(s)	María Barrera Zapata	Colombia	28.23	
3rd place, bronze medalist(s)	Jasmine Greenwood	Australia	28.37	
4	Alessia Scortechini	Italy	28.52	
5	Susannah Kaul	Estonia	29.31	
6	Arianna Hunsicker	Canada	29.37	
7	Audrey Kim	United States	29.43	
8	Zara Mullooly	United Kingdom	29.46	

=== S11 ===
11 swimmers from 11 nations took part. The swimmers with the top eight times, regardless of heat, advanced to the final.

Rank	Heat	Lane	Name	Nation	Result	Notes
1	2	4	Karolina Pelendritou	Cyprus	29.58	Q, CR
2	1	4	Liesette Bruinsma	Netherlands	31.27	Q
3	2	5	Tatiana Blattnerová	Slovakia	34.44	Q
4	1	5	Nadia Báez	Argentina	34.45	Q
5	2	6	Chikako Ono	Japan	34.59	Q
6	2	3	Scarlett Humphrey	United Kingdom	34.92	Q
7	1	3	Sharit Yunque	Colombia	35.04	Q
8	2	2	McClain Hermes	United States	36.33	Q
9	1	6	Yana Berezhna	Ukraine	38.81	
10	2	7	Nadezhda Rak	Kyrgyzstan	45.75	
11	1	2	Tatia Kalandadze	Georgia	50.21	

Final

The final was held on 12 June 2022.

Rank	Athlete	Nation	Result	Notes
1st place, gold medalist(s)	Karolina Pelendritou	Cyprus	29.81	
2nd place, silver medalist(s)	Liesette Bruinsma	Netherlands	31.04	
3rd place, bronze medalist(s)	Tatiana Blattnerová	Slovakia	33.29	
4	Chikako Ono	Japan	34.18	
5	Scarlett Humphrey	United Kingdom	34.19	
6	Nadia Báez	Argentina	34.20	
7	Sharit Yunque	Colombia	35.96	
8	McClain Hermes	United States	36.16	
