= 2022 World Para Swimming Championships – Women's 100 metre freestyle =

The women's 100m freestyle events at the 2022 World Para Swimming Championships were held at the Penteada Olympic Swimming Complex in Madeira between 12 and 18 June.

== Medalists ==
Event	Gold	Silver	Bronze
S3	Leanne Smith; United States	Ellie Challis; Great Britain	Patricia Valle; Mexico
S4	Tanja Scholz; Germany	Lidia Vieira da Cruz; Brazil	Patricia Pereira dos Santos; Brazil
S5	Tully Kearney; Great Britain	Monica Boggioni; Italy	Joana Neves; Brazil
S6	Sara Vargas Blanco; Colombia	Anna Hontar; Ukraine	Grace Harvey; Great Britain
S7	McKenzie Coan; United States	Giulia Terzi; Italy	Denise Grahl; Germany
S8	Xenia Palazzo; Italy	Alice Tai; Great Britain	Cecília Jerônimo de Araújo; Brazil
S9	Mariana Ribeiro; Brazil	Emily Beecroft; Australia	Sarai Gascón Moreno; Spain
S10	Aurélie Rivard; Canada	Bianka Pap; Hungary	Lisa Kruger; Netherlands
S11	Anastasia Pagonis; United States	Liesette Bruinsma; Netherlands	Tatiana Blattnerová; Slovakia
S12	Maria Carolina Gomes Santiago; Brazil	Hannah Russell; Great Britain	Anna Stetsenko; Ukraine
S13	Gia Pergolini; United States	Ayano Tsujiuchi; Japan	Carlotta Gilli; Italy

== Results ==
=== S4 ===
Final

The final was held on 13 June 2022. 8 swimmers from 7 nations took part.

Rank	Athlete	Nation	Result	Notes
1st place, gold medalist(s)	Tanja Scholz	Germany	1:21.28	CR
2nd place, silver medalist(s)	Lidia Vieira da Cruz	Brazil	1:28.63	
2nd place, silver medalist(s)	Patricia Pereira dos Santos	Brazil	1:32.85	
4	Rachael Watson	Australia	1:35.80	
5	Nely Edith Miranda Herrera	Mexico	1:38.98	
6	Kat Swanepoel	South Africa	1:43.50	
7	Jordan Tucker	Canada	2:05.32	
8	Sonja Sigurðardóttir	Iceland	2:22.40	

=== S6 ===
Heats

11 swimmers from 11 nations took part. The swimmers with the top eight times, regardless of heat, advanced to the final.

Rank	Heat	Lane	Name	Nation	Result	Notes
1	1	4	Sara Vargas Blanco	Colombia	1:14.37	Q
2	2	5	Anna Hontar	Ukraine	1:14.68	Q
3	2	6	Grace Harvey	United Kingdom	1:14.84	Q
4	1	5	Nora Meister	Switzerland	1:17.02	Q
5	2	3	Laila Suzigan	Brazil	1:17.76	Q
6	1	3	Shelby Newkirk	Canada	1:17.95	Q
7	1	6	Ayaallah Tewfick	Egypt	1:21.56	Q, AF
8	1	2	Evelin Száraz	Hungary	1:25.35	Q
9	2	2	Thelma Björg Björnsdóttir	Iceland	1:27.06	
10	2	2	Vianney Trejo Delgadillo	Mexico	1:27.21	
	2	4	Ellie Marks	United States	DNS	

Final

The final was held on 13 June 2022.

Rank	Athlete	Nation	Result	Notes
1st place, gold medalist(s)	Sara Vargas Blanco	Colombia	1:12.75	AM
2nd place, silver medalist(s)	Anna Hontar	Ukraine	1:12.80	
2nd place, silver medalist(s)	Grace Harvey	United Kingdom	1:14.60	
4	Shelby Newkirk	Canada	1:15.21	
5	Nora Meister	Switzerland	1:17.15	
6	Laila Suzigan	Brazil	1:17.22	
7	Ayaallah Tewfick	Egypt	1:22.15	
8	Evelin Száraz	Hungary	1:24.45	
