= 2022 World Para Swimming Championships – Women's 50 metre breaststroke =

The women's 50m breaststroke events at the 2022 World Para Swimming Championships were held at the Penteada Olympic Swimming Complex in Madeira between 12 and 18 June.

== Medalists ==
Event	Gold	Silver	Bronze
SB2	Ellie Challis; Great Britain	Veronika Guirenko; Israel	Angela Procida; Italy
SB3	Leanne Smith; United States	Marta Fernández Infante; Spain	Patrícia Pereira; Brazil

== Results ==
=== SB2 ===
Final

Six swimmers from five nations took part.

Rank	Name	Nation	Result	Notes
1st place, gold medalist(s)	Ellie Challis	United Kingdom	1:04.33	WR
2nd place, silver medalist(s)	Veronika Guirenko	Israel	1:25.74	
3rd place, bronze medalist(s)	Angela Procida	Italy	1:42.47	CR
4	Aly van Wyck-Smart	Canada	1:51.29	
5	Nikita Ens	Canada	1:57.12	
6	Fabiola Ramírez Martínez	Mexico	2:12.44	

=== SB3 ===
Final

Eight swimmers from six nations took part.

Rank	Name	Nation	Result	Notes
1st place, gold medalist(s)	Leanne Smith	United States	55.25	AM
2nd place, silver medalist(s)	Marta Fernández Infante	Spain	55.59	
3rd place, bronze medalist(s)	Patrícia Pereira	Brazil	59.65	
4	Kat Swanepoel	South Africa	1:00.10	
5	Nely Miranda	Mexico	1:03.79	
6	Patricia Valle	Mexico	1:05.19	
7	Emine Avcu	Turkey	1:12.65	
8	Larissa Rodrigues	Brazil	1:14.22	
