= 2022 World Para Swimming Championships – Women's 200 metre freestyle =

The women's 200m freestyle events at the 2022 World Para Swimming Championships were held at the Penteada Olympic Swimming Complex in Madeira between 12 and 18 June.

== Medalists ==
Event	Gold	Silver	Bronze
S2	Angela Procida; Italy		
S3	Leanne Smith; United States	Nikita Ens; Canada	Larissa Rodrigues; Brazil
S4	Tanja Scholz; Germany	Lidia Vieira da Cruz; Brazil	Patrícia Pereira; Brazil
S5	Tully Kearney; Great Britain	Monica Boggioni; Italy	Maori Yui; Japan
S14	Bethany Firth; Great Britain	Jessica-Jane Applegate; Great Britain	Louise Fiddes; Great Britain

== Results ==
=== S2 ===
Final

Two swimmers from two nations took part.

Rank	Athlete	Nation	Result	Notes
1st place, gold medalist(s)	Angela Procida	Italy	5:14.62	
	Fabiola Ramírez Martínez	Mexico	5:22.41	

=== S14 ===
Heats

13 swimmers from eight nations took part. The swimmers with the top eight times, regardless of heat, advanced to the final.

Rank	Heat	Lane	Name	Nation	Result	Notes
1	2	4	Bethany Firth	United Kingdom	2:10.23	Q
2	1	4	Jessica-Jane Applegate	United Kingdom	2:12.44	Q
3	1	5	Pernilla Lindberg	Sweden	2:14.54	Q
4	1	3	Ruby Storm	Australia	2:14.66	Q
5	2	3	Madeleine McTernan	Australia	2:15.30	Q
6	2	5	Louise Fiddes	United Kingdom	2:15.50	Q
7	2	2	Eva Coronado Tejeda	Spain	2:16.23	Q
8	1	2	Nattharinee Khajhonmatha	Thailand	2:16.45	Q
9	1	6	Paige Leonhardt	Australia	2:17.25	
10	2	6	Angela Marina	Canada	2:17.46	
11	1	7	Mami Inoue	Japan	2:17.68	
12	2	1	Emma van Dyk	Canada	2:20.62	
13	2	7	Janina Falk	Austria	2:24.56	

Final

The final was held on 12 June 2022.

Rank	Athlete	Nation	Result	Notes
1st place, gold medalist(s)	Bethany Firth	United Kingdom	2:08.72	
2nd place, silver medalist(s)	Jessica-Jane Applegate	United Kingdom	2:10.26	
3rd place, bronze medalist(s)	Louise Fiddes	United Kingdom	2:13.07	
4	Madeleine McTernan	Australia	2:13.47	
5	Ruby Storm	Australia	2:13.99	
6	Pernilla Lindberg	Sweden	2:14.50	
7	Eva Coronado Tejeda	Spain	2:18.76	
8	Nattharinee Khajhonmatha	Thailand	2:20.36	
