= He Shenggao =

Chinese Paralympic swimmer (born 2005)

Personal information
- Nationality: Chinese
- Born: 23 January 2005 (age 21) Guizhou, China

Sport
- Sport: Para swimming
- Disability class: S5, SM5
Medal record
Women's para swimming
Representing China
Paralympic Games
Gold medal – first place	2024 Paris	200 m ind. medley SM5
Gold medal – first place	2024 Paris	Mixed 4×50 m freestyle relay 20pts
Silver medal – second place	2024 Paris	50 m backstroke S5
Silver medal – second place	2024 Paris	50 m butterfly S5
World Championships
Gold medal – first place	2023 Manchester	200 m ind. medley SM5
Gold medal – first place	2023 Manchester	Mixed 4×50 m freestyle relay 20pts
Gold medal – first place	2025 Singapore	50 m backstroke S5
Gold medal – first place	2025 Singapore	50 m butterfly S5
Gold medal – first place	2025 Singapore	200 m ind. medley SM5
Silver medal – second place	2023 Manchester	50 m butterfly S5
Silver medal – second place	2023 Manchester	50 m backstroke S5
Silver medal – second place	2025 Singapore	100 m breaststroke SB6
Silver medal – second place	2025 Singapore	Mixed 4×50 m medley relay 20pts

He Shenggao (born 23 January 2005) is a Chinese para swimmer. She represented China at the 2024 Summer Paralympics.

== Career ==
He represented China at the 2023 World Para Swimming Championships and won god medals in the mixed 4 × 50 metre freestyle relay 20pts and 200 m individual medley SM5, and silver medals in the 50 metre butterfly S5 and 50 metre backstroke S5 events.

He represented China at the 2024 Summer Paralympics and won a gold medal in the mixed 4 × 50 metre freestyle relay 20pts event.
