= 2023 World Para Swimming Championships – Women's 100 metre freestyle =

The women's 100m freestyle events at the 2023 World Para Swimming Championships were held at the Manchester Aquatics Centre between 31 July and 6 August.

== Medalists ==
Event	Gold	Silver	Bronze
S3	Marta Fernández Infante; Spain	Ellie Challis; Great Britain	Susana Schnarndorf; Brazil
S4	Tanja Scholz; Germany	Lidia Vieira da Cruz; Brazil	Gina Boettcher; Germany
S5	Monica Boggioni; Italy	Suzanna Hext; Great Britain	Iryna Poida; Ukraine
S6	Jiang Yuyan; China	Anna Hontar; Ukraine	Nora Meister; Switzerland
S7	Morgan Stickney; United States	Sara Vargas Blanco; Colombia	Tess Routliffe; Canada
S8	Cecília Jerônimo de Araújo; Brazil	Xenia Palazzo; Italy	Alice Tai; Great Britain
S9	Alexa Leary; Australia	Mariana Ribeiro; Brazil	Sarai Gascon; Spain
S10	Aurélie Rivard; Canada	María Barrera Zapata; Colombia	Bianka Pap; Hungary
S11	Liesette Bruinsma; Netherlands	Wang Xinyi; China	Ma Jia; China
S12	Maria Carolina Gomes Santiago; Brazil	Anna Stetsenko; Ukraine	Lucilene da Silva Sousa; Brazil
S13	Carlotta Gilli; Italy	Katja Dedekind; Australia	Olivia Chambers; United States
