= 2022 World Para Swimming Championships – Women's 50 metre butterfly =

The women's 50m butterfly events at the 2022 World Para Swimming Championships were held at the Penteada Olympic Swimming Complex in Madeira between 12–18 June.

== Medalists ==
Event	Gold	Silver	Bronze
S5	Marta Fernández Infante; Spain	Sevilay Öztürk; Turkey	Joana Neves; Brazil
S6	Ellie Marks; United States	Sara Vargas Blanco; Colombia	Nicole Turner; Ireland
S7	Danielle Dorris; Canada	Giulia Terzi; Italy	Tess Routliffe; Canada

== Results ==
=== S5 ===
Heats

13 swimmers from nine nations took part. The swimmers with the top eight times, regardless of heat, advanced to the final.

Rank	Heat	Lane	Name	Nation	Result	Notes
1	2	4	Marta Fernández Infante	Spain	42.27	Q, CR
2	2	5	Sevilay Öztürk	Turkey	44.99	Q
3	1	4	Joana Neves	Brazil	46.62	Q
4	1	5	Giulia Ghiretti	Italy	48.18	Q
5	1	6	Jordan Tucker	Canada	54.24	Q
6	1	3	Darlin Romero	Colombia	54.53	Q
7	2	6	Solène Sache	France	54.55	Q
8	2	2	Dunia Felices	Peru	1:00.44	Q
9	1	2	Ellie Challis	United Kingdom	1:02.34	
10	2	7	Meryem Nur Tunug	Turkey	1:05.04	
11	1	7	Jessica Tinney	Canada	1:07.65	
12	2	1	Clémence Paré	Canada	1:09.89	
	2	3	Sümeyye Boyacı	Turkey	DSQ	

Final

The final was held on 14 June 2022.

Rank	Athlete	Nation	Result	Notes
1st place, gold medalist(s)	Marta Fernández Infante	Spain	41.91	CR
2nd place, silver medalist(s)	Sevilay Öztürk	Turkey	44.38	
3rd place, bronze medalist(s)	Joana Neves	Brazil	45.06	AM
4	Giulia Ghiretti	Italy	47.23	
5	Solène Sache	France	54.02	
6	Darlin Romero	Colombia	54.54	
7	Dunia Felices	Peru	1:00.98	
	Jordan Tucker	Canada	DSQ	
