= Sara Vargas Blanco =

Colombian Paralympic swimmer

Personal information
- Full name: Sara del Pilar Vargas Blanco
- Born: 16 November 2006 (age 19) La Mesa, Cundinamarca, Colombia
- Height: 1.28 m (4 ft 2 in)

Sport
- Country: Colombia
- Sport: Para swimming
- Disability: Achondroplasia
- Disability class: S6; S7
Medal record
Representing Colombia
Women's para swimming
Event	1st	2nd	3rd
World Championships	2	4	2
Parapan American Games	7	3	1
Total	9	7	3
World Championships
Gold medal – first place	2022 Madeira	100 m freestyle S6
Gold medal – first place	2023 Manchester	50 m freestyle S7
Silver medal – second place	2022 Madeira	50 m freestyle S6
Silver medal – second place	2022 Madeira	50 m butterfly S6
Silver medal – second place	2023 Manchester	100 m freestyle S7
Silver medal – second place	2025 Singapore	50 m freestyle S7
Bronze medal – third place	2025 Singapore	50 m butterfly S7
Bronze medal – third place	2025 Singapore	100 m freestyle S7
Parapan American Games
Gold medal – first place	2019 Lima	50 m freestyle S6
Gold medal – first place	2019 Lima	50 m butterfly S6
Gold medal – first place	2019 Lima	100 m freestyle S6
Gold medal – first place	2019 Lima	100 m backstroke S6
Gold medal – first place	2023 Santiago	100 m freestyle S7
Gold medal – first place	2023 Santiago	100 m backstroke S7
Gold medal – first place	2023 Santiago	200 m medley SM7
Silver medal – second place	2019 Lima	400 m freestyle S6
Silver medal – second place	2023 Santiago	50 m freestyle S8
Silver medal – second place	2023 Santiago	50 m butterfly S7.
Bronze medal – third place	2023 Santiago	4×100 m mixed medley relay 34 pts

Sara del Vilar Vargas Blanco (born 16 November 2006) is a Colombian Paralympic swimmer who competes in international swimming competitions. She was the youngest Parapan American Games champion after winning four golds aged twelve years old.

== Career ==
Vargas Blanco competed at the 2020 Summer Paralympics and reached her highest achievements of sixth place in both 50m freestyle S6 and 50m butterfly S6.

She has also won four medals at the World Para Swimming Championships including two gold and two silver medals.
