= Swimming at the 2020 Summer Paralympics – Women's 50 metre backstroke S5 =

Women's 50 metre backstroke S5 at the XVI Paralympic Games
- Venue: Tokyo Aquatics Centre
- Dates: 30 August 2021
- Competitors: 14 from 10 nations

Medalists
1st place, gold medalist(s)		Lu Dong	China
2nd place, silver medalist(s)		Teresa Perales	Spain
3rd place, bronze medalist(s)		Sevilay Öztürk	Turkey

The Women's 50 metre backstroke S5 event at the 2020 Paralympic Games took place on 30 August 2021, at the Tokyo Aquatics Centre.

== Heats ==
The swimmers with the top eight times, regardless of heat, advanced to the final.

Rank	Heat	Lane	Name	Nationality	Time	Notes
1	2	4	Lu Dong	China	40.00	Q, PR
2	1	4	Sümeyye Boyacı	Turkey	43.28	Q
3	1	5	Sevilay Öztürk	Turkey	44.16	Q
4	2	3	Teresa Perales	Spain	44.54	Q
5	2	5	Monica Boggioni	Italy	46.10	Q
6	2	6	Cheng Jiao	China	48.40	Q
7	1	7	Zhang Li	China	48.83	Q
8	1	3	Mayumi Narita	Japan	49.72	Q
8	2	2	Giulia Ghiretti	Italy	49.72	
10	1	6	Karina Hernández	Mexico	50.30	
11	2	7	Natallia Shavel	Belarus	50.48	
12	2	7	Elizabeth Noriega	Argentina	50.70	
13	1	1	Vladyslava Kravchenko	Malta	1:05.98	
	2	1	Suzanna Hext	Great Britain	DNS	

== Final ==
50m backstroke final
Rank	Lane	Name	Nationality	Time	Notes
1st place, gold medalist(s)	4	Lu Dong	China	37.18	WR
2nd place, silver medalist(s)	6	Teresa Perales	Spain	43.02	
3rd place, bronze medalist(s)	3	Sevilay Öztürk	Turkey	43.48	
4	5	Sümeyye Boyacı	Turkey	43.94	
5	2	Monica Boggioni	Italy	45.46	
6	8	Mayumi Narita	Japan	47.86	
7	1	Li Zhang	China	48.02	
8	7	Cheng Jiao	China	48.75	
