= Maiara =

Maiara is a feminine given name. Notable people with the name include:

- Maiara Barreto (born 1987), Brazilian Paralympic swimmer
- Maiara Walsh (born 1988), American actress
- Maiara Carla Henrique Pereira (born 1987), Brazilian singer-songwriter, member of Maiara & Maraisa
- Maiara Carolina Niehues, Brazilian professional footballer
