= 2025 World Para Swimming Championships – Women's 50 metre butterfly =

The Women's 50 metre butterfly events at the 2025 World Para Swimming Championships were held at the Singapore Aquatic Centre between 21 and 27 September 2025.

== Schedule ==
Women's 50 metre butterfly events will be held across the following schedule:

Women's 50 metre butterfly
Day	Date	Classifications
Day 1	21 Sept	
Day 2	22 Sept	
Day 3	23 Sept	S5
Day 4	24 Spt	
Day 5	25 Sept	S7
Day 6	26 Sept	
Day 7	27 Sept	S6

== Medal summary ==
Event	Gold	Silver	Bronze
S5	He Shenggao; China	Katie Kubiak; United States	Sevilay Öztürk; Turkey
S6	Jiang Yuyan; China	Dearbhaile Brady; Ireland	Mayara Petzold; Brazil
S7	Danielle Dorris; Canada	Mallory Weggemann; United States	Sara Vargas Blanco; Colombia

== Race summaries ==
=== S5 ===
The women's 50 metre butterfly S5 event will be held on 23 September. Eleven swimmers will take part, with the top eight proceeding to the final. S4 classified swimmers are also eligible for the event.

The relevant records at the beginning of the event were as follows:

Record	Athlete	Time	City	Country
S4
World	Katie Kubiak (USA)	0:38.96	Boise	United States
Championship	Marta Fernandez Infante (ESP)	0:41.91	Funchal	Portugal
Americas	Katie Kubiak (USA)	00:39.7	Boise	United States
Asian	Brenda Anellia Larry (MAS)	00:59.0	manama	Bahrain
European	Marta Fernandez Infante (ESP)	00:40.2	Tokyo	Japan
Oceania	Rachael Watson (AUS)	00:56.4	Berlin	Germany
S5
World	Lu Dong (CHN)	0:38.17	Paris	France
Championship	Lu Dong (CHN)	0:39.94	Manchester	United Kingdom
African	Adri Visser (RSA)	00:51.6	Johannesburg	South Africa
Americas	Joana Neves (BRA)	00:45.1	Funchal	Portugal
Asian	Lu Dong (CHN)	00:38.2	Paris	France
European	Olena Akopyan (UKR)	00:40.5	Beijing	China

==== Heats ====
Rank	Heat	Lane	Athlete	Time	Note
1	2	4	Katie Kubiak (USA)	41.18	Q CR
2	1	4	He Shenggao (CHN)	41.82	Q
3	2	5	Sevilay Ozturk (TUR)	43.99	Q
4	1	5	Angel Mae Otom (PHI)	47.82	Q
5	2	3	Giulia Ghiretti (ITA)	49.92	Q
6	2	2	Alessandra Oliveira dos Santos (BRA)	55.35	Q
7	2	6	Maria Fanouria Tziveleki (GRE)	55.97	Q
8	1	6	Jordan Tucker (CAN)	56.02	Q
9	1	2	Berta García Grau (ESP)	57.37	R
10	2	7	Dunia Felices (PER)	58.65	R

==== Final ====
Rank	Lane	Athlete	Time	Note
1st place, gold medalist(s)	5	He Shenggao (CHN)	38.82	CR
2nd place, silver medalist(s)	4	Katie Kubiak (USA)	39.34	WR ^{SB4}
3rd place, bronze medalist(s)	3	Sevilay Ozturk (TUR)	43.79	
4	6	Angel Mae Otom (PHI)	48.00	
5	2	Giulia Ghiretti (ITA)	49.12	
6	7	Allessandra Oliveira Dos Santos (BRA)	53.21	
7	8	Jordan Tucker (CAN)	54.46	
8	1	Maria Fanouria Tziveleki (GRE)	55.66	

=== S6 ===
The women's 50 metre butterfly S6 event was held on 27 September. Seven swimmers took part in a direct final.

The relevant records at the beginning of the event were as follows:

Record	Athlete	Time	City	Country
World	Jiang Yuyan (CHN)	0:34.55	Manchester	United Kingdom
Championship	Jiang Yuyan (CHN)	0:34.55	Manchester	United Kingdom
African	Caitlin Botha (NAM)	02:35.8	Limoges	France
Americas	Ellie Marks (USA)	00:36.3	Minneapolis	United States
Asian	Jiang Yuyan (CHN)	00:34.6	Manchester	United Kingdom
European	Eleanor Robinson (GBR)	00:35.2	Sheffield	United Kingdom
Oceania	Tiffany Thomas Kane (AUS)	00:36.8	Rio de Janeiro	Brazil

==== Final ====
Rank	Lane	Athlete	Class	Result	Notes
1st place, gold medalist(s)	4	Jiang Yuyan (CHN)	S6	34.75	
2nd place, silver medalist(s)	5	Dearbhaile Brady (IRL)	S6	35.61	
3rd place, bronze medalist(s)	3	Mayara Petzold (BRA)	S6	36.80	
4	2	Anna Hontar (UKR)	S6	36.95	
5	6	Liu Daomin (CHN)	S6	37.55	
6	7	Verena Schott (GER)	S6	39.80	
7	1	Grace Harvey (GBR)	S6	43.74	

=== S7 ===
The women's 50 metre butterfly S7 event was held on 23 September. Fourteen swimmers took part, with the top eight proceeding to the final.

The relevant records at the beginning of the event were as follows:

Record	Athlete	Time	City	Country
World	Danielle Dorris (CAN)	0:32.99	Tokyo	Japan
Championship	Danielle Dorris (CAN)	0:33.98	Manchester	United Kingdom
Americas	Danielle Dorris (CAN)	00:33.0	Tokyo	Japan
Asian	Huang Min (CHN)	00:34.5	Beijing	China
European	Giulia Terzi (ITA)	00:34.3	Tokyo	Japan
Oceania	Jacqueline Freney (AUS)	00:35.2	London	United Kingdom

==== Heats ====
Rank	Heat	Lane	Athlete	Class	Result	Notes
1	2	4	Danielle Dorris (CAN)	S7	34.08	Q
2	1	4	Mallory Weggemann (USA)	S7	35.27	Q
3	1	5	Veronika Korzhova (UKR)	S7	36.36	Q
4	2	5	Sara Vargas Blanco (COL)	S7	36.95	Q
5	1	6	Rylee Sayer (NZL)	S7	37.34	Q
6	2	3	An Nishida (JPN)	S7	37.97	Q
7	1	2	Ani Palian (AIN)	S7	37.98	Q
8	1	3	Julia Gaffney (USA)	S7	37.99	Q
9	2	6	Iona Winnifrith (GBR)	S7	38.25	
10	2	2	Naomi Ortiz Mendez (MEX)	S7	39.15	
11	2	7	Naomi Mandujano (MEX)	S7	40.90	
12	1	7	Ahalya Lettenberger (USA)	S7	41.46	
13	2	1	Alejandra Aybar (DOM)	S7	43.79	
14	1	1	Nicola St Clair Maitland (SWE)	S7	44.14	

==== Final ====
Rank	Lane	Athlete	Class	Result	Notes
1st place, gold medalist(s)	4	Danielle Dorris (CAN)	S7	33.93	CR
2nd place, silver medalist(s)	5	Mallory Weggemann (USA)	S7	34.25	
3rd place, bronze medalist(s)	6	Sara Vargas Blanco (COL)	S7	35.21	
4	3	Veronika Korzhova (UKR)	S7	36.03	
5	2	Rylee Sayer (NZL)	S7	37.30	
6	7	An Nishida (JPN)	S7	37.41	
7	1	Ani Palian (AIN)	S7	37.74	
8	8	Julia Gaffney (USA)	S7	37.78	
