= 2023 World Para Swimming Championships – Women's 50 metre butterfly =

The women's 50m butterfly events at the 2023 World Para Swimming Championships were held at the Manchester Aquatics Centre between 31 July and 6 August.

== Medalists ==
Event	Gold	Silver	Bronze
S5	Lu Dong; China	He Shenggao; China	Sevilay Öztürk; Turkey
S6	Jiang Yuyan; China	Verena Schott; Germany	Elizabeth Marks; United States
S7	Danielle Dorris; Canada	Tess Routliffe; Canada	Julia Gaffney; United States

== Results ==
=== S5 ===
Heats

Ten swimmers from seven nations took part. The swimmers with the top eight times, regardless of heat, advanced to the final.

Rank	Heat	Lane	Name	Nation	Result	Notes
1	2	5	He Shenggao	China	44.21	Q
2	1	4	Sevilay Öztürk	Turkey	44.37	Q
3	2	4	Lu Dong	China	45.27	Q
4	2	3	Cheng Jiao	China	46.32	Q
5	1	6	Angel Mae Otom	Philippines	46.83	Q
6	1	5	Esthefany Rodrigues	Brazil	47.41	Q
7	1	3	Giulia Ghiretti	Italy	48.64	Q
8	2	2	Darlin Jiseb Romero Sanchez	Colombia	51.67	Q
9	1	2	Dunia Felices	Peru	1:04.07	
	2	6	Sümeyye Boyacı	Turkey	DSQ	

Final

The final was held on 2 August.

Rank	Athlete	Nation	Result	Notes
1st place, gold medalist(s)	Lu Dong	China	39.94	CR
2nd place, silver medalist(s)	He Shenggao	China	40.09	
3rd place, bronze medalist(s)	Sevilay Öztürk	Turkey	43.87	
4	Cheng Jiao	China	46.44	
5	Esthefany Rodrigues	Brazil	46.66	
6	Angel Mae Otom	Philippines	47.52	
7	Giulia Ghiretti	Italy	47.99	
8	Darlin Jiseb Romero Sanchez	Colombia	51.82	
