= Marta Fernández Infante =

Spanish Paralympic swimmer

Marta Fernández
Personal information
- Full name: Marta Fernández Infante
- Born: 6 August 1994 (age 32) Burgos, Spain

Sport
- Sport: Swimming
- Classifications: S4, SB3, SM4, S5
Medal record
Women's para swimming
Representing Spain
Paralympic Games
Gold medal – first place	2020 Tokyo	50 m breaststroke SB3
Silver medal – second place	2020 Tokyo	50 m butterfly S5
Silver medal – second place	2024 Paris	100 m freestyle S3
Bronze medal – third place	2020 Tokyo	50 m freestyle S4
Bronze medal – third place	2024 Paris	50 m backstroke S3
Bronze medal – third place	2024 Paris	50 m breaststroke SB3
World Championships
Gold medal – first place	2022 Madeira	50 m butterfly S5
Gold medal – first place	2022 Madeira	150 m ind. medley SM4
Gold medal – first place	2023 Manchester	50 m freestyle S3
Gold medal – first place	2023 Manchester	100 m freestyle S3
Silver medal – second place	2022 Madeira	50 m breaststroke SB3
Silver medal – second place	2023 Manchester	150 m ind. medley SM3
Silver medal – second place	2025 Singapore	50 m freestyle S3
Silver medal – second place	2025 Singapore	100 m freestyle S3
Bronze medal – third place	2022 Madeira	4x50 m mixed medley relay 20pts
Bronze medal – third place	2023 Manchester	50 m breaststroke SB3
Bronze medal – third place	2023 Manchester	4x50 m mixed medley relay 20pts
Bronze medal – third place	2025 Singapore	50 m backstroke S3
European Championships
Bronze medal – third place	2026 Kocaeli	100 m freestyle S4

Marta Fernández Infante (born 6 August 1994 in Burgos) is a Spanish Paralympic swimmer from Valladolid, Spain.

== Career ==
She has cerebral palsy. At the 2020 World Para Swimming European Open Championships (her first international event), she won one gold medal (in the 50m butterfly S5) and three silvers (in the 50m breaststroke SB3, 100m freestyle S4, and 50m freestyle S4), as well as breaking a world record (in the 50m butterfly S4). At the 2020 Summer Paralympics, she won a silver medal in the 50 metre butterfly S5 event, a gold medal in the 50 metre breaststroke SB3 event, and a bronze medal in the 50m freestyle S4. She broke her own world record in the 50 metre butterfly S4.
