= Swimming at the 2020 Summer Paralympics – Women's 50 metre butterfly S5 =

Women's 50 metre butterfly S5 at the XVI Paralympic Games
- Venue: Tokyo Aquatics Centre
- Dates: 27 August 2021
- Competitors: 14 from 10 nations

Medalists
1st place, gold medalist(s)		Lu Dong	China
2nd place, silver medalist(s)		Marta Fernández Infante	Spain
3rd place, bronze medalist(s)		Cheng Jiao	China

The Women's 50 metre butterfly S5 event at the 2020 Paralympic Games took place on 27 August 2021, at the Tokyo Aquatics Centre.

== Heats ==
The swimmers with the top 8 times, regardless of heat, advanced to the final.

Rank	Heat	Lane	Name	Nationality	Time	Notes
1	2	4	Lu Dong	China	40.74	Q, AS
2	1	4	Marta Fernández Infante	Spain	41.27	Q, WR
3	2	5	Cheng Jiao	China	43.05	Q
4	1	5	Sevilay Öztürk	Turkey	45.88	Q
5	1	3	Yao Cuan	China	46.24	Q
6	2	3	Joana Maria da Silva Neves	Brazil	46.32	Q, AS
7	2	2	Esthefany Rodrigues	Brazil	47.24	Q
8	1	6	Giulia Ghiretti	Italy	47.88	Q
9	2	6	Sumeyye Boyaci	Turkey	49.12	
10	1	2	Natalia Shavel	Belarus	50.19	
11	2	7	Gina Böttcher	Germany	52.78	
12	1	7	Dunia Felices	Peru	1:00.29	
13	2	1	Brenda Anellia Larry	Malaysia	1:00.62	AS
14	1	1	Vladyslava Kravchenko	Malta	1:18.48	

== Final ==
Rank	Lane	Name	Nationality	Time	Notes
1st place, gold medalist(s)	4	Lu Dong	China	39.54	WR (S5)
2nd place, silver medalist(s)	5	Marta Fernández Infante	Spain	40.22	WR (S4)
3rd place, bronze medalist(s)	3	Cheng Jiao	China	43.04	
4	7	Joana Maria da Silva Neves	Brazil	45.33	
5	6	Sevilay Öztürk	Turkey	45.81	
6	2	Yao Cuan	China	46.13	
7	1	Esthefany Rodrigues	Brazil	46.49	
8	8	Giulia Ghiretti	Italy	46.66	
