= 2022 World Para Swimming Championships – Women's 150 metre individual medley =

The women's 150m individual medley events at the 2022 World Para Swimming Championships were held at the Penteada Olympic Swimming Complex in Madeira between 12–18 June.

== Medalists ==
Event	Gold	Silver	Bronze
SM3	Leanne Smith; United States	Tanja Scholz; Germany	Larissa Rodrigues; Brazil

== Results ==
=== SM3 ===
Final

Six swimmers from five nations took part.

Rank	Athlete	Nation	Result	Notes
1st place, gold medalist(s)	Leanne Smith	United States	2:56.94	
2nd place, silver medalist(s)	Tanja Scholz	Germany	3:14.35	
3rd place, bronze medalist(s)	Larissa Rodrigues	Brazil	3:56.62	
4	Veronika Guirenko	Israel	4:24.98	
5	Nikita Ens	Canada	4:28.73	
6	Aly van Wyck-Smart	Canada	4:56.59	
