= 2023 World Para Swimming Championships – Women's 150 metre individual medley =

The women's 150m individual medley events at the 2023 World Para Swimming Championships will be held at the Manchester Aquatics Centre between 31 July and 6 August.

== Medalists ==
Event	Gold	Silver	Bronze
SM3	Tanja Scholz; Germany	Marta Fernandez Infante; Spain	Ellie Challis; Great Britain
SM4	Kat Swanepoel; South Africa	Gina Böttcher; Germany	Patricia Pereira dos Santos; Brazil
