= Nikita Ens =

Canadian Paralympic swimmer

Personal information
- Born: October 19, 1988 (age 37) Vancouver, Canada
- Height: 185 cm (6 ft 1 in)

Sport
- Sport: Paralympic swimming
- Disability class: S3
- Club: Saskatoon Lasers
Medal record
Paralympic swimming
Representing Canada
World Championships
Silver medal – second place	2022 Madeira	200m freestyle S3

Nikita Ens (born October 19, 1988) is a Canadian Paralympic swimmer who competes in international swimming competitions. She is a World silver medallist and has competed at the 2020 Summer Paralympics.

== Early life and education ==
Nikita Ens was born in 1988 to parents Rod and Monica Ens. She attended Carpenter High School and was a high school provincial champion in shot put in 2006. In 2010, she graduated from the University of Saskatchewan with a bachelor of science in biology. She is pursuing a master’s degree in theological studies.

== Career ==
After becoming paralyzed, Ens trained in track and field with the Saskatoon Cyclones. She was a medallist at the Canadian nationals. She made the standards for the Rio 2016 Paralympics but did not compete.

Ens began para-swimming in 2017 and joined the Saskatoon Lasers Swim Club, training under Eric Kramer. She made her major international debut at the 2019 World Para Swimming Championships, where she competed in the 100-metre freestyle S3, the 50-metre freestyle S4, the 50-metre backstroke S3, and the 150-metre individual medley SM4. Going into Worlds, she held the Canadian records in S3 100-metre freestyle and 50-metre backstroke. She broke her record for the 100-metre freestyle S3 and qualified for two finals.

In June 2021, she competed in a para swimming World Series event in Germany, setting new personal best times in the 100-metre breaststroke SB2 and 200-metre freestyle S3. She made her Paralympic debut at the Tokyo Paralympics. She posted personal bests in all her races, but finished ninth in her heats the 50-metre backstroke S3 and the 100m freestyle S3 events, failing to post a top eight time to qualify for the finals.

She won a silver medal in the women's 200-metre freestyle S3 at the 2022 World Para Swimming Championships. At the 2023 World Para Swimming Championships, Ens placed fifth in the women's 200-metre freestyle S3 and in the 50-metre backstroke SB2. She will represent Canada at the 2024 Paralympic Games.

== Personal life ==
Ens became a C5 paraplegic in February 2014 following a car crash with an impaired driver near Meadow Lake, Saskatchewan.
