= Swimming at the 2024 Summer Paralympics – Qualification =

Qualification for swimming at the 2024 Summer Paralympics begin on 1 October 2022 and finish on 31 January 2024. There will be a total of 325 male and 280 female quotas in 141 swimming events (71 male, 64 female and 6 mixed open relays).

== Timeline ==
Athletes have to compete in at least one of the following competitions in order to be qualified for the Summer Paralympics.

Means of qualification	Date	Venue	Berths
2023 Para Swimming World Series	17–19 February 2023	(Australia) Melbourne	—
2023 Para Swimming World Series	9–12 March 2023	(Italy) Lignano Sabbiadoro	—
2023 Para Swimming World Series	16–19 March 2023	(United Kingdom) Sheffield	—
2023 Para Swimming World Series	20–22 April 2023	(United States) Minneapolis	—
2023 Para Swimming World Series	29 April – 1 May 2023	Singapore	—
2023 Para Swimming World Series	11–14 May 2023	(Germany) Berlin	—
2023 Para Swimming World Series	26–28 May 2023	(France) Limoges	—
2023 Para Swimming World Series	5–8 October 2023	(Mexico) Tijuana	—
2023 World Para Swimming Championships	31 July – 6 August 2023	(United Kingdom) Manchester	270 qualified slots 142 male 128 female
2022 Asian Para Games	22–28 October 2023	(China) Hangzhou	—
2023 Parapan American Games	17–25 November 2023	(Chile) Santiago	—
MQS Slot Allocation	1 October 2022 – 31 January 2024	—	325 qualified slots 178 male 147 female
Bipartite Commission Invitation	16 April 2024	—	10 qualified slots 5 male 5 female
Total			605

== Quotas ==
The qualification slots are allocated to the NPC not to the individual athlete. In Bipartite Commission Invitation method, the slot is allocated to the individual athlete not to the NPC.

- An NPC can allocate a maximum of three eligible athletes per individual medal event.
- NPCs can allocate an eligible athlete who has met at least one MQS (Minimum Qualification Standard) in an unlimited number of medal events - as long as the athlete has met the MET (Minimum Entry Time) for each event.
- NPCs can allocated one team in each relay event. All team members must have entered at least one individual medal event in order to be selected as a member of the relay team.

=== Allocated time targets ===
Event	Class	Male		Female	
Event	Class	MQS	MET	MQS	MET
50m freestyle	S3	54.92	59.22	—	
50m freestyle	S4	40.63	43.24	44.50	49.93
50m freestyle	S5	35.15	35.96	—	
50m freestyle	S6	—		35.69	37.63
50m freestyle	S7	29.48	31.76	—	
50m freestyle	S8	—		33.03	34.48
50m freestyle	S9	26.29	26.62	—	
50m freestyle	S10	25.49	25.72	28.88	29.41
50m freestyle	S11	27.69	28.25	33.13	34.99
50m freestyle	S13	24.96	25.34	28.57	29.07
100m freestyle	S3	—		2:37.18	4:30.36
100m freestyle	S4	1:33.79	1:38.42	—	
100m freestyle	S5	1:18.77	1:20.46	1:32.01	1:40.09
100m freestyle	S6	1:09.34	1:11.35	—	
100m freestyle	S7	—		1:16.07	1:18.69
100m freestyle	S8	1:00.72	1:01.61	—	
100m freestyle	S9	—		1:04.77	1:05.87
100m freestyle	S10	55.75	56.30	1:04.77	1:05.87
100m freestyle	S11	—		1:13.90	1:15.54
100m freestyle	S12	56.97	58.29	1:05.79	1:08.42
200m freestyle	S2	5:00.25	5:52.51	—	
200m freestyle	S3	4:10.92	4:39.21	—	
200m freestyle	S4	3:20.72	3:31.99	—	
200m freestyle	S5	2:56.38	3:02.47	3:29.29	4:02.64
200m freestyle	S14	1:57.95	2:00.54	2:15.56	2:17.89
400m freestyle	S6	5:27.37	5:31.35	5:54.31	6:01.73
400m freestyle	S7	5:05.24	5:17.73	5:38.52	6:00.00
400m freestyle	S8	4:43.89	4:51.00	5:21.86	5:44.21
400m freestyle	S9	4:26.93	4:28.23	4:56.28	5:05.75
400m freestyle	S10	—		4:58.86	5:02.46
400m freestyle	S11	5:04.43	5:22.96	5:50.35	7:44.46
400m freestyle	S13	4:31.59	4:37.10	4:58.07	5:44.28
50m backstroke	S1	1:53.32	1:53.32	—	
50m backstroke	S2	1:09.31	1:30.58	1:55.28	1:55.28
50m backstroke	S3	56.99	1:00.49	1:13.49	2:09.11
50m backstroke	S4	49.22	52.01	54.97	1:02.11
50m backstroke	S5	39.38	41.79	48.96	53.88
100m backstroke	S1	4:05.98	4:05.98	—	
100m backstroke	S2	2:28.15	3:16.21	3:54.95	3:54.95
100m backstroke	S6	1:21.53	1:23.70	1:30.43	1:35.53
100m backstroke	S7	1:15.74	1:20.26	—	
100m backstroke	S8	1:10.91	1:14.35	1:24.91	1:27.32
100m backstroke	S9	1:06.30	1:07.60	1:16.48	1:19.85
100m backstroke	S10	1:04.00	1:05.79	1:14.43	1:16.22
100m backstroke	S11	1:12.94	1:15.63	1:24.68	1:30.38
100m backstroke	S12	1:09.02	1:13.72	1:20.50	1:28.73
100m backstroke	S13	1:03.28	1:06.22	1:12.66	1:17.17
100m backstroke	S14	1:02.06	1:03.07	1:12.27	1:13.93
50m breaststroke	SB2	1:24.25	1:42.78	—	
50m breaststroke	SB3	55.77	58.06	1:07.05	1:10.97
100m breaststroke	SB4	1:56.83	2:00.75	2:20.91	2:51.00
100m breaststroke	SB5	1:42.49	1:46.05	2:01.79	2:11.48
100m breaststroke	SB6	1:25.36	1:27.84	1:42.59	1:50.45
100m breaststroke	SB7	—		1:43.34	1:47.16
100m breaststroke	SB8	1:14.84	1:18.71	1:28.79	1:31.61
100m breaststroke	SB9	1:12.19	1:14.06	1:22.51	1:25.25
100m breaststroke	SB11	1:24.11	1:28.09	1:34.52	1:45.81
100m breaststroke	SB12	—		1:29.41	1:38.06
100m breaststroke	SB13	1:11.90	1:17.13	1:23.39	1:27.57
100m breaststroke	SB14	1:08.69	1:10.03	1:23.30	1:25.29
50m butterfly	S5	37.61	38.77	51.52	57.92
50m butterfly	S6	33.22	34.46	40.20	40.96
50m butterfly	S7	32.50	34.08	38.23	40.45
100m butterfly	S8	1:05.27	1:07.01	1:26.93	1:34.00
100m butterfly	S9	1:02.53	1:03.48	1:12.53	1:14.85
100m butterfly	S10	59.48	1:01.71	1:13.42	1:19.75
100m butterfly	S11	1:10.30	1:17.12	—	
100m butterfly	S12	1:01.95	1:04.21	—	
100m butterfly	S13	1:00.04	1:02.12	1:12.61	1:17.25
100m butterfly	S14	58.32	58.74	1:10.45	1:11.70
150m individual medley	SM3	3:44.30	4:42.88	—	
150m individual medley	SM4	2:50.06	2:59.45	3:08.62	3:42.83
200m individual medley	SM5	—		4:47.34	5:15.98
200m individual medley	SM6	2:55.12	3:06.56	3:15.14	3:28.28
200m individual medley	SM7	2:45.82	2:54.49	3:12.14	3:32.77
200m individual medley	SM8	2:31.87	2:39.65	3:03.77	3:12.83
200m individual medley	SM9	2:24.20	2:25.74	2:40.96	2:46.65
200m individual medley	SM10	2:23.17	2:25.37	2:40.02	2:45.38
200m individual medley	SM11	2:40.33	2:49.86	3:03.89	3:15.69
200m individual medley	SM13	2:19.54	2:22.95	2:39.83	2:44.50
200m individual medley	SM14	2:14.06	2:16.61	2:36.45	2:38.42
Mixed 4 x 50m freestyle relay 20pts		3:02.91			
Mixed 4 x 50m medley relay 20pts		3:37.50			
Mixed 4 × 100 m freestyle relay S14		4:23.97			
Mixed 4 × 100 m freestyle relay 49pts (VI)		4:25.09			
Mixed 4 × 100 m freestyle relay 34pts		4:41.09			
Mixed 4 × 100 m medley relay 34pts		5:31.72			

== See also ==
- Swimming at the 2024 Summer Olympics – Qualification
