= Carpenter High School (Meadow Lake, Saskatchewan) =

School in Saskatchewan, Canada

Coordinates: 54.12275°N 108.44187°W

Carpenter High School in Meadow Lake, Saskatchewan is home of the Spartans. Carpenter High School is a grade 9 to 12 school as of the 2019 - 2020 school year. Carpenter high School is currently located on the corner of 9th avenue west and 5th street west and the current building was opened in the fall of 2000.

In 1950, Mr. O. Lidfors' tender was accepted to build a new high school in Meadow Lake for a cost of $89 000. The school had six classrooms and was called the Meadow Lake Composite High School. It was located on a partial block bordered by 4th and 5th streets west and 4th and 5th avenues west.

In 1955, an addition of four rooms were added at a cost of $49,994.00. This wing was officially opened in the spring of 1956, and the school was then named Carpenter High School in honor of Mr. James Carpenter, who taught in Meadow Lake for 32 years. Mr. Carpenter retired in June 1956.

== Notable alumni ==
- Nikita Ens – Paralympic swimmer
