= Sevilay Öztürk =

Turkish Paralympic swimmer (born 2003)

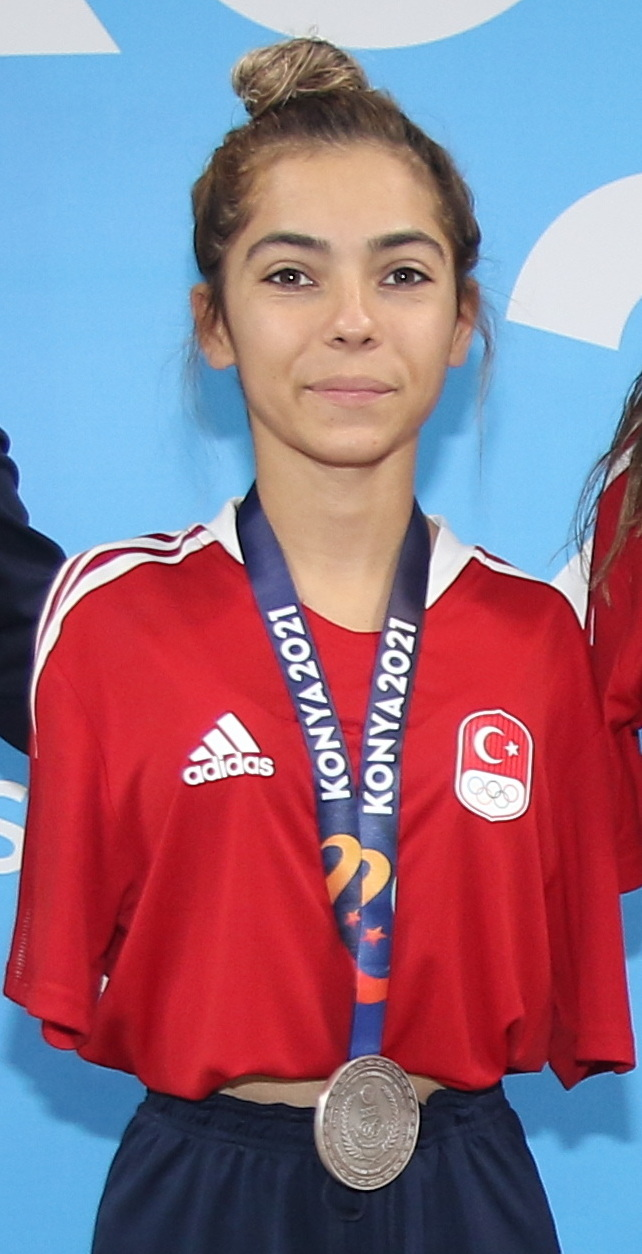
- Öztürk in 2021 Islamic Solidarity Games

Personal information
- Full name: Sevilay Öztürk
- Nationality: Turkish
- Born: 28 November 2003 (age 22) Kahramanmaraş, Turkey
- Height: 1.45 m (4 ft 9 in)

Sport
- Sport: Swimming
- Strokes: Freestyle, backstroke, butterfly
- Club: Kahramanmaraş Municipality SC
- Coach: Ali Uzun
Medal record
Paralympic swimming
Representing Turkey
Paralympic Games
Bronze medal – third place	2020 Tokyo	50 m backstroke S5
Bronze medal – third place	2024 Paris	50 m butterfly S5
World Championships
Silver medal – second place	2022 Madeira	50 m backstroke S5
Silver medal – second place	2022 Madeira	50 m butterfly S5
Silver medal – second place	2025 Singapore	50 m backstroke S5
Bronze medal – third place	2019 London	50 m butterfly S5
Bronze medal – third place	2023 Manchester	50 m butterfly S5
Bronze medal – third place	2025 Singapore	50 m butterfly S5
European Championships
Gold medal – first place	2026 Kocaeli	50 m backstroke S5
Gold medal – first place	2026 Kocaeli	50 m butterfly S5
Silver medal – second place	2018 Dublin	50 m backstroke S5
Silver medal – second place	2021 Madeira	50 m backstroke S5
Silver medal – second place	2021 Madeira	50 m butterfly S5
Bronze medal – third place	2021 Madeira	50 metre freestyle S5
Bronze medal – third place	2021 Madeira	100 metre freestyle S5
Bronze medal – third place	2020 Funchal	50 metre freestyle S5
Bronze medal – third place	2020 Funchal	200 metre freestyle S5
Islamic Solidarity Games
Gold medal – first place	2021 Konya	50 m freestyle (S4-S10)
Gold medal – first place	2021 Konya	50 m butterfly (S5-S7)
Silver medal – second place	2021 Konya	100 m freestyle (S4-S10)
Silver medal – second place	2021 Konya	200 m freestyle (S4-S5)
Silver medal – second place	2021 Konya	50 m backstroke (S4-S5)
European Para Youth Games
Gold medal – first place	2017 Liguria	50 m backstroke S5

Sevilay Öztürk (born 28 November 2003) is a Turkish Paralympic swimmer. She competes in the disability category of S5 in freestyle, backstroke and butterfly, specializing in sprint events. She competed in the 2016 Summer Paralympics.

== Personal history ==
Sevilay Öztürk was born to Bülent Öztürk and Hülya as their first child on 28 November 2003. She has no arms as a birth defect (bilateral congenital upper extremity agenesis).

Very much supported by her father, she was schooled in the neighborhood. She learned to use her foot for writing.

== Swimming career ==
Öztürk began swimming in 2010 after she met Beytullah Eroğlu at a hospital in her hometown, the successful national Paralympic swimmer, who has also bilateral limb deficiency. She began with regular swimming exercise in 2013. She won three gold and two silver medals in the national Para swimming championships. She internationally debuted at the 30th International German Championships in Berlin in June 2016. She was qualified for the 2016 Summer Paralympics, and represented her country in Rio de Janeiro, Brazil. She was the youngest competitor at all. She failed to capture any medal. She took part at the 2017 European Para Youth Games held in Liguria, Italy, and won the gold medal in the 50 m Backstroke S5 event.

Öztürk's disability swimming classification is S5 due to her limb deficiency as a birth defect. The 1.45 m (4 ft 9 in) tall Para swimmer is coached by Ali Uzun in Kahramanmaraş Munispality SC.

At the 2019 World Para Swimming Championships in London, U.K., she won the bronze medal in the 50 m butterfly S5 event with a time of 47.35.

She was named as one of two flag bearers along with Mahmut Bozteke by the Turkish National Paralympic Committee to lead the Turkish contingent for the opening ceremony of the 2024 Summer Paralympics.

She won the gold medal in the women's open age 50 m butterfly event at the 2026 Para Swimming World Series Lignano Sabbiadoro, Italy.

== Achievements ==
Competition	Place	Event	Rank	Time	Ref
30th International German Championships	Germany, Berlin	50 m Freestyle S5	Heats	56.57	
30th International German Championships	Germany, Berlin	50 m Butterfly Youth S5	5	52.87	
30th International German Championships	Germany, Berlin	100 m Freestyle S5	Heats	2:10.39	
30th International German Championships	Germany, Berlin	100 m Backstroke Time Trial S5	2nd place, silver medalist(s)	2:09.96	
2016 Paralympic Games	Brazil, Rio de Janeiro	50 m Freestyle S5	8	50.34	
2016 Paralympic Games	Brazil, Rio de Janeiro	50 m Butterfly S5	5	50.14	
2016 Paralympic Games	Brazil, Rio de Janeiro	50 m Backstroke S5	6	50.19	
2016 Paralympic Games	Brazil, Rio de Janeiro	100 m Freestyle S5	Heats	1:54.87	
2017 European Para Youth Games	Italy, Liguria	50 m Freestyle S5	4	46.60	
2017 European Para Youth Games	Italy, Liguria	50 m Backstroke S5	1st place, gold medalist(s)	46.70	
2019 World Para Swimming Championships	United Kingdom London	50 m Butterfly S5	3rd place, bronze medalist(s)	47.35	
2019 World Para Swimming Championships	United Kingdom London	50 m Backstroke S5	8th	50.54	
