= Larissa Rodrigues =

Brazilian Paralympic swimmer (born 2004)

Personal information
- Nickname: Lari
- Born: 16 November 2004 Guaraciaba, Santa Catarina, Brazil
- Years active: 2022–present

Sport
- Sport: Paralympic swimming
- Disability class: S3, SM3
Medal record
Women's paralympic swimming
Representing Brazil
World Championships
Bronze medal – third place	2022 Madeira	200 m freestyle S3
Bronze medal – third place	2022 Madeira	150 m ind. medley SM3

Larissa Rodrigues (born 16 November 2004) is a Brazilian Paralympic swimmer.

== Early life ==
Rodrigues was born with a congenital malformation of her arms and legs, leaving them small. At the age of 12, she began swimming to move around in the water. Noticing that she had a high performance, she began competing in the initial swimming categories.

== Career ==
Rodrigues' first success was at the Brazilian Under-20 Paralympic Swimming Championships, where she won three gold medals in five competitions, including the 200m freestyle, 50m breaststroke and 150m medley. She next competed at the 2022 World Para Swimming Championships in Madeira where she won two bronze medals in the 200m freestyle S3 and 150m individual medley SM3 events.
