= 2023 World Para Swimming Championships – Women's 200 metre freestyle =

The men's 200m freestyle events at the 2023 World Para Swimming Championships were held at the Manchester Aquatics Centre between 31 July and 6 August.

== Medalists ==
Event	Gold	Silver	Bronze
S3	Ellie Challis; Great Britain	Susana Schnarndorf; Brazil	Leanne Smith; United States
S5	Monica Boggioni; Italy	Tanja Scholz; Germany	Agáta Koupilová; Czech Republic
S14	Jessica-Jane Applegate; Great Britain	Bethany Firth; Great Britain	Louise Fiddes; Great Britain

== Results ==
=== S14 ===
Heats

- WR : Bethany Firth (United Kingdom) 2:02.09

Rank	Heat	Lane	Name	Nation	Result	Notes
1	1	4	Jessica-Jane Applegate	Great Britain	2:10.96	Q
2	2	6	Pernilla Lindberg	Sweden	2:11.72	Q
3	2	5	Aira Kinoshita	Japan	2:12.62	Q
4	2	4	Bethany Firth	Great Britain	2:12.63	Q
5	2	3	Ruby Storm	Australia	2:13.12	Q
6	1	5	Louise Fiddes	Great Britain	2:13.49	Q
7	1	3	Madeleine McTernan	Australia	2:13.53	Q
8	1	6	Nattharinee Khajhonmatha	Thailand	2:17.13	Q
9	1	7	Tejeda Eva Coronado	Spain	2:17.74	
10	2	7	Chan Yui-lam	Hong Kong	2:18.43	
11	1	2	Angela Marina	Canada	2:18.44	
12	2	2	Paige Leonhardt	Australia	2:19.31	
13	2	1	Janina Falk	Austria	2:19.41	
14	1	1	Ho Ying Cheung	Hong Kong	2:20.36	

Final

Rank	Lane	Athlete	Nation	Result	Notes
1st place, gold medalist(s)	4	Jessica-Jane Applegate	Great Britain	2:09.09	Q
2nd place, silver medalist(s)	6	Bethany Firth	Great Britain	2:10.05	Q
3rd place, bronze medalist(s)	7	Louise Fiddes	Great Britain	2:10.36	Q
4	5	Pernilla Lindberg	Sweden	2:10.67	Q
5	3	Aira Kinoshita	Japan	2:10.83	Q
6	8	Nattharinee Khajhonmatha	Thailand	2:13.51	Q
7	2	Ruby Storm	Australia	2:14.02	Q
8	1	Madeleine McTernan	Australia	2:16.40	Q
