= 2019 World Para Swimming Championships – Women's 50 metre backstroke =

The women's 50m backstroke events at the 2019 World Para Swimming Championships were held in the London Aquatics Centre at the Queen Elizabeth Olympic Park in London between 9–15 September.

== Medalists ==
Event	Gold	Silver	Bronze
S2	Yip Pin Xiu; Singapore	Angela Procida; Italy	Aly van Wyck-Smart; Canada
S3	Edenia Garcia; Brazil	Leanne Smith; United States	Ellie Challis; Great Britain
S4	Maryna Verbova; Ukraine	Alexandra Stamatopoulou; Greece	Arjola Trimi; Italy
S5	Teresa Perales; Spain	Sumeyye Boyaci; Turkey	Monica Boggioni; Italy
