= Tanja Scholz =

German swimmer (born 1984)

Personal information
- Born: 29 June 1984 (age 42) Elmshorn, Schleswig-Holstein, West Germany
- Years active: 2021–present

Sport
- Country: Germany
- Sport: Swimming
- Disability: Incomplete paraplegia
- Disability class: S4, SM3
- Events: Freestyle, backstroke
- Club: PSV Union Neumünster
- Coached by: Kirsten Bruhn

Achievements and titles
- Paralympic finals: 2024
- World finals: 2022
- Regional finals: 2024
Medal record
Representing Germany
Women's paralympic swimming
Paralympic Games
Gold medal – first place	2024 Paris	150m medley SM4
Silver medal – second place	2024 Paris	50 m freestyle S4
World Championships
Gold medal – first place	2022 Madeira	50m freestyle S4
Gold medal – first place	2022 Madeira	100m freestyle S4
Gold medal – first place	2022 Madeira	200m freestyle S4
Gold medal – first place	2023 Manchester	50m freestyle S4
Gold medal – first place	2023 Manchester	100m freestyle S4
Gold medal – first place	2023 Manchester	150m medley SM3
Gold medal – first place	2025 Singapore	50m breaststroke SB2
Gold medal – first place	2025 Singapore	150 m ind. medley SM3
Silver medal – second place	2023 Manchester	50m breaststroke SB2
Silver medal – second place	2023 Manchester	200m freestyle S5
Bronze medal – third place	2022 Madeira	50m backstroke S4
Bronze medal – third place	2022 Madeira	150m medley SM3
European Championships
Gold medal – first place	2026 Kocaeli	50m breaststroke SB2
Gold medal – first place	2026 Kocaeli	150m ind. medley SM4
Gold medal – first place	2026 Kocaeli	50m freestyle S4
Silver medal – second place	2026 Kocaeli	50m backstroke S4
Bronze medal – third place	2024 Funchal	50m breaststroke SM2

Tanja Scholz (born 29 June 1984) is a German Paralympic swimmer, who won the 150m medley SM4 event at the 2024 Summer Paralympics, and came second in the 50 m freestyle S4 event. She is a seven-time World Champion and won a bronze medal at the 2024 World Para Swimming European Open Championships.

== Personal life ==
Scholz is from Elmshorn, Schleswig-Holstein, West Germany. She has three children. Scholz was diagnosed with paraplegia after a horse riding accident in June 2020, and has used a wheelchair since. At the time, she was told that she would not be able to swim due to the extent of her injuries.

== Career ==
Scholz started competing in competitive para swimming in January 2021; prior to her accident, she had been a competitive able bodied swimmer. She trains at PSV Union Neumünster, and is coached by Kirsten Bruhn. Scholz was the top athlete at the six event 2022 Para Swimming World Series. At the World Series event in Aberdeen, Scotland, she set the world record in the 100 metres freestyle S4 competition.

Scholz won five medals at the 2022 World Para Swimming Championships. She won gold medals in the 50, 100 and 200 metre freestyle S4 events and won bronze medals in the 50 metre backstroke S4 and 150 metre medley SM3 competitions. She competed in the 150 metres medley event 26 minutes after her 100 metres freestyle victory.

At the 2023 World Para Swimming Championships, Scholz won the 50 metre freestyle S4, 100 metre freestyle S4 and 150 metre individual medley SM3 competitions. She won the 100 metre freestyle and 150 metre medley events within 20 minutes of each other, and also finished second in the final of the 5 metre breaststroke SB2 event. At the 2024 World Para Swimming European Open Championships, Scholz came third in the 50 metre SB2 breaststroke event.

At the 2024 Summer Paralympics, Scholz won the 150m medley SM4 event, and came second in the 50 m freestyle S4 event.
