= Janina Falk =

Austrian swimmer

Susana Veiga
Personal information
- Born: 5 February 2003 (age 23)

Sport
- Country: Austria
- Sport: Paralympic athletics
- Disability class: S14
- Event: freestyle
- Coached by: Detlef Leu
Medal record
Paralympic athletics
Representing Austria

Janina Falk (born 5 February 2003) is an Austrian Paralympic swimmer who competes in international elite events. She specializes in freestyle. She competed at the 2020 Summer Paralympics.

She competed at the 2020 European Para Swimming Championships, and 2021 European Para Swimming Championships, winning two silver and a bronze medal.
