= Angela Procida =

Italian Paralympic swimmer

Personal information
- Born: 29 June 2000 (age 26) Castellammare di Stabia, Italy

Sport
- Country: Italy
- Sport: Paralympic swimming
- Disability: Spinal cord injury
- Disability class: S2
- Events: Freestyle, backstroke
- Club: Fiamme Oro
Medal record
Representing Italy
Paralympic swimming
Paralympic Games
| Bronze medal – third place | 2024 Paris | 100 m backstroke S2 |
World Championships
| Gold medal – first place | 2022 Madeira | 200m freestyle S2 |
| Silver medal – second place | 2019 London | 50m backstroke S2 |
| Silver medal – second place | 2022 Madeira | 50m backstroke S3 |
| Silver medal – second place | 2023 Manchester | 50m backstroke S2 |
| Bronze medal – third place | 2019 London | 100m backstroke S2 |
| Bronze medal – third place | 2022 Madeira | 100m backstroke S2 |
| Bronze medal – third place | 2022 Madeira | 50m breastroke SB2 |
| Bronze medal – third place | 2025 Singapore | 100m backstroke S2 |
European Championships
| Gold medal – first place | 2026 Kocaeli | 100m backstroke S2 |
| Bronze medal – third place | 2021 Funchal | 50m backstroke S3 |
Para-cycling
Road World Championships
| Silver medal – second place | 2023 Glasgow | Road race H2 |
| Bronze medal – third place | 2023 Glasgow | Time trial H2 |
European Championships
| Silver medal – second place | 2023 Rotterdam | Time trial H2 |
| Bronze medal – third place | 2023 Rotterdam | Road race H2 |

Angela Procida (born 29 June 2000) is an Italian Paralympic swimmer and para cyclist who competes in international swimming competitions and specializes in the backstroke.

== Career ==
She participated at the 2020 Summer Paralympics where she reached three finals but did not medal.

== Accident ==
In November 2005, Procida and her family were involved in a serious car accident: her father and young sister died at the scene, her mother and her other sister survived uninjured, Angela was the only occupant of the vehicle who had permanent damage to her lower body.
