= Ellie Challis =

British Paralympic swimmer

Personal information
- Nationality: British
- Born: 23 March 2004 (age 22)

Sport
- Sport: Para swimming
- Disability class: S3, SB2
- Club: Clacton Swimming Club (CSC); England
- Coached by: Lisa Lawrence (CSC); Aled Davies (GBR)
Medal record
Women's para swimming
Representing Great Britain
Paralympic Games
Gold medal – first place	2024 Paris	50 m backstroke S3
Silver medal – second place	2020 Tokyo	50 m backstroke S3
World Championships
Gold medal – first place	2022 Madeira	50 m breaststroke SB2
Gold medal – first place	2023 Manchester	50 m breaststroke SB2
Gold medal – first place	2023 Manchester	200 m freestyle S3
Gold medal – first place	2025 Singapore	50 m backstroke S3
Silver medal – second place	2022 Madeira	50 m backstroke S3
Silver medal – second place	2022 Madeira	50 m freestyle S3
Silver medal – second place	2022 Madeira	100 m freestyle S3
Silver medal – second place	2023 Manchester	50 m freestyle S3
Silver medal – second place	2023 Manchester	100 m freestyle S3
Silver medal – second place	2025 Singapore	50 m breaststroke SB2
Bronze medal – third place	2019 London	50 m backstroke S3
Bronze medal – third place	2023 Manchester	150 m ind. medley SM3
Bronze medal – third place	2025 Singapore	150 m ind. medley SM3

Ellie Challis (born 23 March 2004) is a British para swimmer. She represented Great Britain at the 2020 and 2024 Summer Paralympics.

== Career ==
Challis made her international debut at the 2019 World Para Swimming Championships and won a bronze medal in the women's 50 metre backstroke S3.

Challis competed in the women's 50 metre backstroke S3 event at the 2020 Summer Paralympics and won a silver medal.

== Personal life ==
Ellie Challis born in Harold Wood and grew up in Clacton, Essex and attended Tendring Technology College. When she was 16 months old, Challis contracted meningitis, which resulted in the above knee amputation of her legs and a below elbow amputation of her arms.

She was inspired to take up swimming after watching the movie Dolphin Tale.
