= Veronika Guirenko =

Israeli Paralympic swimmer

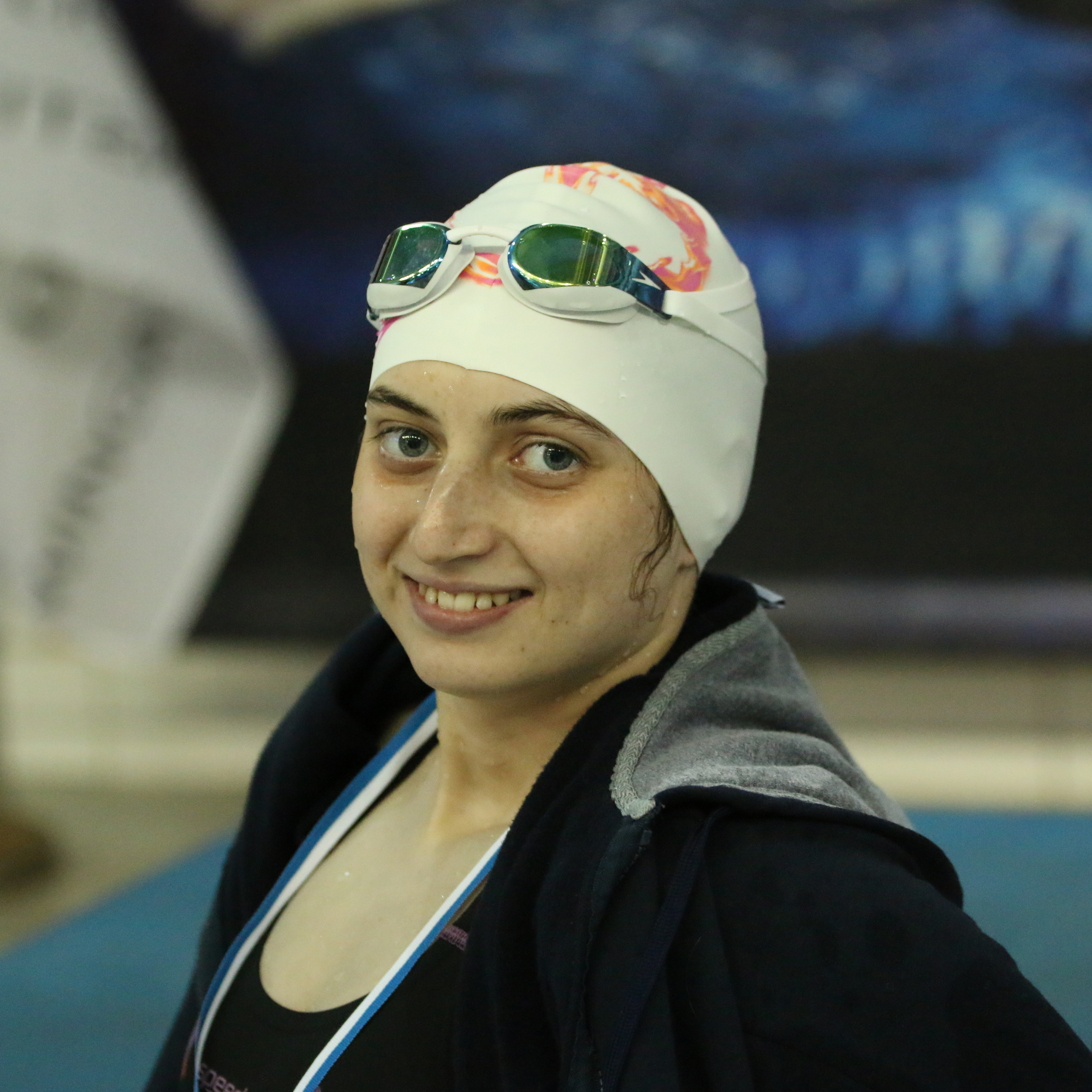

Personal information
- Native name: ורוניקה גיירנקו
- Born: 5 March 1998 (age 28) Haifa, Israel

Sport
- Sport: Paralympic swimming
- Disability class: S3, SB2
Medal record
Representing Israel
World Championships
Silver medal – second place	2022 Madeira	50m breaststroke SB2
Bronze medal – third place	2023 Manchester	50m breaststroke SB2
European Championships
Silver medal – second place	2024 Madeira	50m breaststroke SB2

Veronika Guirenko (Hebrew: ורוניקה גיירנקו; born 5 March 1998) is an Israeli Paralympic swimmer who competes in international swimming competitions. She is a World silver medalist and European silver medalist in breaststroke, she has competed at the 2016 and 2020 Summer Paralympics. She is competing for Israel at the 2024 Paris Paralympics.
