= Gina Böttcher =

German Paralympic swimmer

Personal information
- Born: 11 April 2001 (age 25) Brandenburg an der Havel, Germany

Sport
- Country: Germany
- Sport: Paralympic swimming
- Disability: Dysmelia
- Disability class: S4, SB3, SM4
- Club: SC Potsdam
Medal record
Paralympic swimming
Representing Germany
Paralympic Games
Silver medal – second place	2024 Paris	50 m backstroke S4
World Championships
Silver medal – second place	2023 Manchester	150m ind. medley SM4
Silver medal – second place	2025 Singapore	200 m freestyle S4
Bronze medal – third place	2025 Singapore	150m ind. medley SM4
European Championships
Gold medal – first place	2026 Kocaeli	100m freestyle S4
Silver medal – second place	2018 Dublin	50m freestyle S4
Silver medal – second place	2020 Funchal	200m freestyle S5
Bronze medal – third place	2018 Dublin	150m ind. medley SM4
Bronze medal – third place	2018 Dublin	4x50m freestyle relay 20pts
Bronze medal – third place	2020 Funchal	100m freestyle S4
Bronze medal – third place	2020 Funchal	150m ind. medley SM4
Bronze medal – third place	2026 Kocaeli	150m ind. medley SM4

Gina Böttcher (born 11 April 2001) is a German Paralympic swimmer who competes in international elite competitions. She is a six-time European medalist. She has competed at the 2020 Summer Paralympics but did not medal.
