= Sümeyye Boyacı =

Turkish Paralympic swimmer (born 2003)

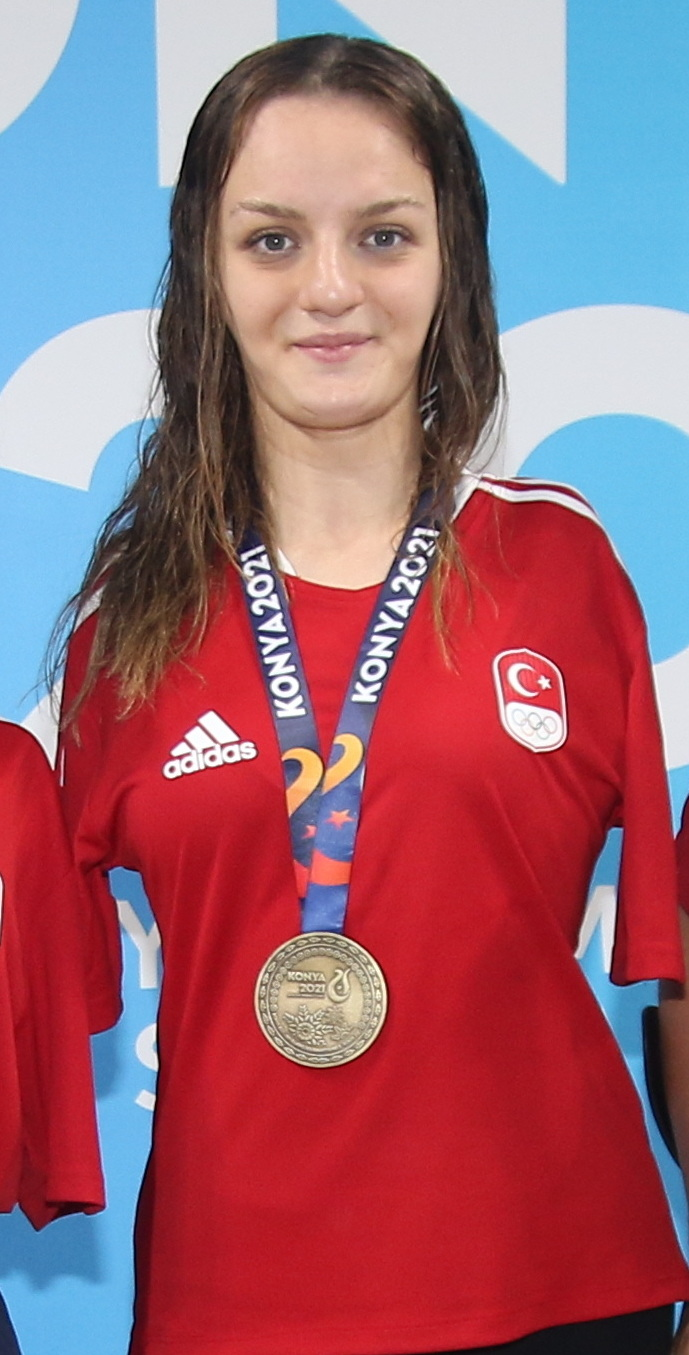
- Boyacı in 2021 Islamic Solidarity Games

Personal information
- Nationality: Turkish
- Born: 5 February 2003 (age 23) Eskişehir, Turkey
- Height: 1.58 m (5 ft 2 in)
- Weight: 49 kg (108 lb)

Sport
- Sport: Swimming
- Strokes: Freestyle, backstroke, butterfly
- Club: Eskilehir Metropolitan Nunicipality SC
- Coach: Mehmet Bayrak
Medal record
Paralympic swimming
Representing Turkey
World Championships
Gold medal – first place	2022 Madeira	50 m backstroke S5
Silver medal – second place	2019 London	50 m backstroke S5
Bronze medal – third place	2023 Manchester	50 m backstroke S5
Bronze medal – third place	2025 Singapore	50 m backstroke S5
European Championships
Gold medal – first place	2018 Dublin	50 m backstroke S5
Silver medal – second place	2020 Funchal	100 metre freestyle S5
Bronze medal – third place	2020 Funchal	200 metre freestyle S5
Islamic Solidarity Games
Gold medal – first place	2021 Konya	100 m freestyle (S4-S10)
Gold medal – first place	2021 Konya	200 m freestyle (S4-S5)
Gold medal – first place	2021 Konya	50 m backstroke (S4-S5)
Bronze medal – third place	2021 Konya	50 m butterfly (S5-S7)
World Para Swimming World Series
Gold medal – first place	2019 Indianapolis	50 m backstroke S5
European Para Youth Games
Bronze medal – third place	2017 Liguria	50 m backstroke S1-5

Sümeyye Boyacı (born 5 February 2003) is a Turkish Paralympic swimmer. She competes in the disability category of S5 in freestyle, backstroke and butterfly, specializing in sprint events.

== Personal history ==
Sümeyye Boyacı was born as her parents' first child in Eskişehir, Turkey on 5 February 2003. She has no arms (bilateral congenital upper extremity agenesis) and a hip dislocation as a birth defect.

She was schooled in a special primary school in her hometown, where she learned writing with her foot in the first grade.

== Painting career ==
At the age of four and half, she began painting with her foot. She made a painting for Altın Balık ("The Golden Fish"), the Turkish translation of the Russian book of tale (Russian: Cказка о рыбаке и рыбке) by Alexander Pushkin. Her painting was presented to the Turkish President Abdullah Gül for his official visit to Russia. In April 2009, her watercolor paintings were on display in a personal exhibition in Moscow, Russia. Boyacı gifted one of her paintings to the First Lady of Russia Svetlana Medvedeva in 2010. In 2014, she participated at an exhibition in Eskişehir for traditional Turkish handicrafts with her paper marblings.

== Swimming career ==
Boyacı decided to begin with swimming as she carefully watched the fish in her aquarium, and discovered that they swim without arms. Boyacı began with swimming in 2008. She has been coached by Mehmet Bayrak since 2012.

In June 2016, she competed at the 30th International German Championships in Berlin. She internationally debuted in the senior class in 2016. She was qualified for the 2016 Summer Paralympics, and represented her country in Rio de Janeiro, Brazil. She failed to capture any medal. She took part at the 2017 European Para Youth Games held in Liguria, Italy, and won the bronze medal in the 50 m Backstroke S1-5 event.

In 2019, she captured the gold medal in the 50 m Backstroke S5 event at the World Para Swimming World Series held in Indianapolis, USA with a time of 45.28. At the 2019 World Para Swimming Championships in London, U.K., she won the silver medal in the 50 m backstroke S5 event with a time of 44.74.

The 1.58 m (5 ft 2 in) tall para swimmer at 49 kg (108 lb) is a member of Eskişehir Metropolitan Municipality Sports Club. Boyacı's disability swimming classification is S5 due to her limb deficiency as a birth defect.

== Achievements ==
Competition	Place	Event	Rank	Time	Ref
30th International German Championships	Germany, Berlin	100 m Breaststroke S6	Heats	4:03.27	
30th International German Championships	Germany, Berlin	50 m Backstroke Youth-B S5	1st place, gold medalist(s)	52.60	
30th International German Championships	Germany, Berlin	50 m Freestyle S5	Heats	51.68	
30th International German Championships	Germany, Berlin	50 m Butterfly S5	Heats	1:01.27	
2016 Paralympic Games	Brazil, Rio de Janeiro	50 m Backstroke S5	8	50.34	
2017 European Para Youth Games	Italy, Liguria	50 m Freestyle S1-5	4	52.21	
2017 European Para Youth Games	Italy, Liguria	50 m Backstroke S1-5	3rd place, bronze medalist(s)	51.98	
2017 World Championships	Mexico, Mexico City	50m Freestyle S5	7	47.85	
2017 World Championships	Mexico, Mexico City	50m Butterfly S5	6	50.99	
2017 World Championships	Mexico, Mexico City	50m Backstroke S5	4	46.57	
2017 World Championships	Mexico, Mexico City	200m Freestyle S1-5	7	3:58.38	
2018 World Para Swimming European Championships	Ireland, Dublin	50m Backstroke S5	1st place, gold medalist(s)	45.21	
2019 World Para Swimming World Series	United States Indianapolis	50 m Backstroke S5	1st place, gold medalist(s)	45.28	
2019 World Para Swimming Championships	United Kingdom London	50 m Backstroke S5	2nd place, silver medalist(s)	44.74	
2022 World Para Swimming Championships	Portugal Madeira	50 m Backstroke S5	1st place, gold medalist(s)	41.58	
