= Sonja Sigurðardóttir =

Icelandic Paralympic swimmer

Personal information
- Born: 28 January 1990
- Years active: 1997- present
- Height: 1.58 m (5 ft 2 in)

Sport
- Sport: Para swimming
- Disability class: S4, SB3, SM4
- Coached by: Thomas Hajek

Sonja Sigurðardóttir (born 28 January 1990) is an Icelandic female breaststroke, freestyle and medley para swimmer. She competed at the Paralympics for the first time in 2008 and again she was eligible to compete at the Rio Paralympics.

== Career ==
She started her Para swimming career in 1997 and she also made her debut at the International level in 2004.

She made her debut at the Paralympics in 2008. In 2016, she was awarded the Best Sportswoman of the Year by the Icelandic Sports Association by the Disabled.
