= Haideé Aceves =

Mexican Paralympic swimmer

Personal information
- Full name: Haideé Viviana Aceves Pérez
- Born: 23 March 1993 (age 33) Guadalajara, Mexico

Sport
- Country: Mexico
- Sport: Paralympic swimming
- Disability: Arthrogryposis
- Disability class: S3
Medal record
Paralympic swimming
Representing Mexico
Paralympic Games
Silver medal – second place	2024 Paris	50 m backstroke S2
Silver medal – second place	2024 Paris	100 m backstroke S2
Parapan American Games
Gold medal – first place	2011 Guadalajara	50m breaststroke SB2
Silver medal – second place	2011 Guadalajara	50m freestyle S3
Silver medal – second place	2011 Guadalajara	100m freestyle S3
Bronze medal – third place	2015 Toronto	50m backstroke S4
Bronze medal – third place	2019 Lima	50m backstroke S3
World Championships
Bronze medal – third place	2010 Eindhoven	100m freestyle S3
Bronze medal – third place	2010 Eindhoven	200m freestyle S3
Bronze medal – third place	2010 Eindhoven	50m butterfly S3
Bronze medal – third place	2013 Montreal	200m freestyle S3
Bronze medal – third place	2013 Montreal	50m breaststroke SB2

Haideé Viviana Aceves Pérez (born 23 March 1993) is a Mexican Paralympic swimmer who competes in international swimming competitions. She is a Parapan American Games champion and five-time World bronze medalist, she has also competed at three Paralympic Games where her highest achievement was finishing in sixth place in the 50m freestyle S3 at the 2012 Summer Paralympics, she competed for Mexico at the 2016 and 2020 Summer Paralympics.
