= Maiara Barreto =

Brazilian Paralympic swimmer

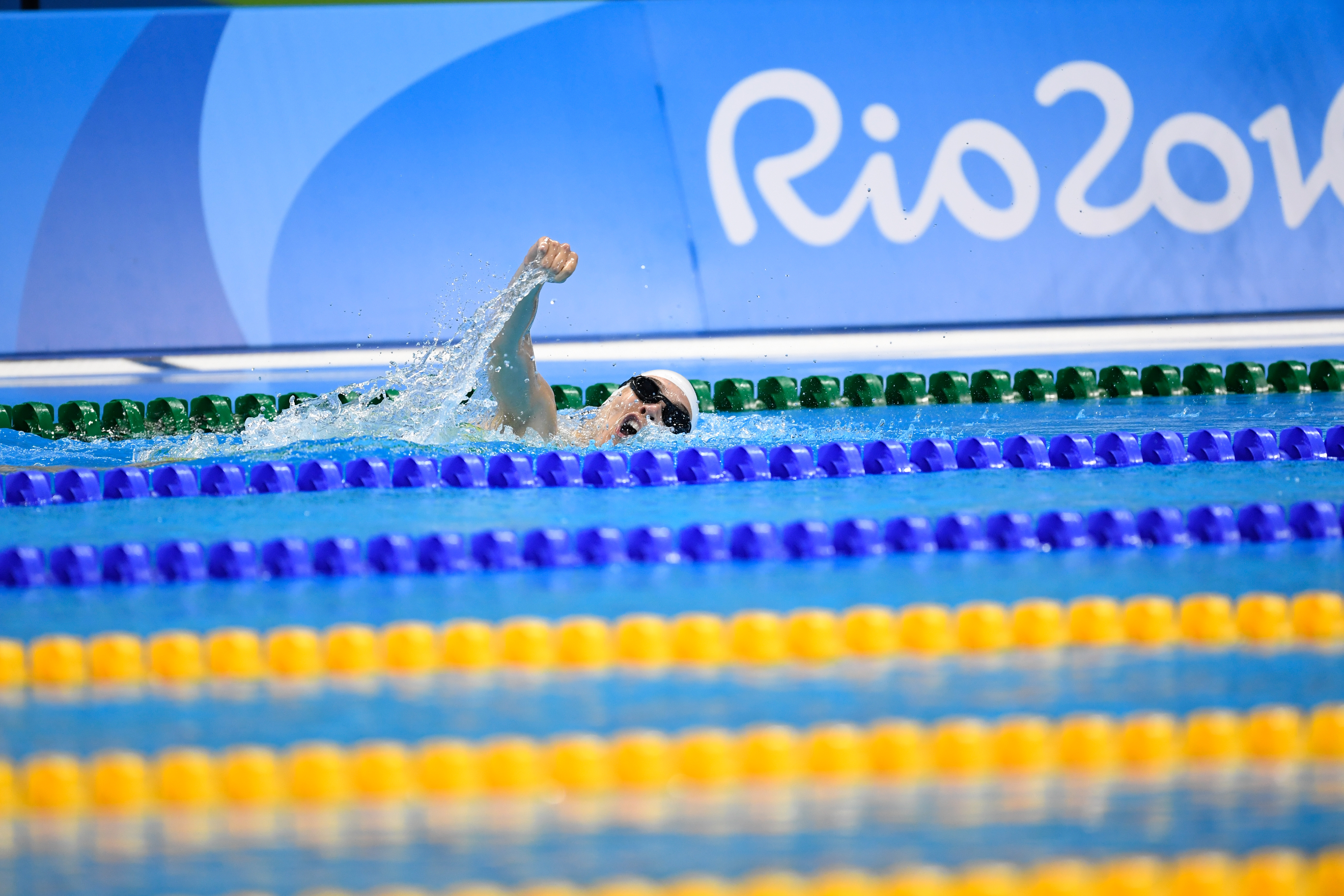
- Barreto at the 2016 Summer Paralympics

Personal information
- Full name: Maiara Regina Pereira Barreto
- Born: 6 July 1987 (age 38) Jacareí, Brazil
- Height: 1.76 m (5 ft 9 in)
- Weight: 63 kg (139 lb)

Sport
- Country: Brazil
- Sport: Paralympic swimming
- Disability: Spinal cord injury
- Disability class: S3
Medal record
Paralympic swimming
Representing Brazil
World Championships
| Bronze medal – third place | 2022 Madeira | 50 m backstroke S3 |
Parapan American Games
| Silver medal – second place | 2019 Lima | 50m backstroke S3 |
| Silver medal – second place | 2019 Lima | 50m breaststroke SB3 |

Maiara Regina Pereira Barreto (born 6 July 1987) is a Brazilian Paralympic swimmer who competes in international elite competitions. She is a double Parapan American Games silver medalist and has competed at the 2016 Summer Paralympics.

== Career ==
Barreto became a paraplegic in 2009 after a motorcycle accident.

== Personal life ==
Barreto is a pharmacist by training and a graduate of the University of São Paulo. Her capstone project assessed adverse effects of vancomycin use in a hospital setting.
