= Lídia Vieira da Cruz =

Brazilian Paralympic swimmer

Personal information
- Nationality: Brazilian
- Born: 4 September 1998 (age 27) Duque de Caxias, Brazil

Sport
- Sport: Para swimming
- Disability class: S4
Medal record
Women's para swimming
Representing Brazil
Paralympic Games
Bronze medal – third place	2024 Paris	50 m backstroke S4
Bronze medal – third place	2024 Paris	150 m ind. medley SM4
Bronze medal – third place	2024 Paris	Mixed 4×50 m freestyle relay 20pts
World Championships
Silver medal – second place	2025 Singapore	Mixed 4×50 m freestyle relay 20pts
Silver medal – second place	2025 Singapore	50 m freestyle S4
Bronze medal – third place	2025 Singapore	50 m backstroke S4
Parapan American Games
Gold medal – first place	2023 Santiago	50m freestyle S5
Silver medal – second place	2023 Santiago	50m backstroke S4
Bronze medal – third place	2023 Santiago	50m breaststroke SB3
Bronze medal – third place	2023 Santiago	150m individual medley SM4

Lídia Vieira da Cruz (born 4 September 1998) is a Brazilian Paralympic swimmer. She represented Brazil at the 2024 Summer Paralympics.

== Career ==
She represented Brazil at the 2024 Summer Paralympics and won a bronze medal in the mixed 4 × 50 metre freestyle relay 20pts event.
