= Kat Swanepoel =

South African Paralympic swimmer

Personal information
- Born: 5 August 1987 (age 38) Pretoria, South Africa

Sport
- Sport: Paralympic swimming
- Disability: Multiple sclerosis
- Disability class: S4, SM4
Medal record
Representing South Africa
World Championships
Gold medal – first place	2023 Manchester	150m individual medley SM4
Gold medal – first place	2023 Manchester	50m backstroke S4
Silver medal – second place	2022 Madeira	150m individual medley SM4
Silver medal – second place	2023 Manchester	50m breaststroke SB3
Bronze medal – third place	2022 Madeira	50m backstroke S4

Katherine "Kat" Swanepoel (born 5 August 1987) is a South African Paralympic swimmer who competes at international swimming competitions, she is a double World champion. She competed at the 2020 Summer Paralympics.

Swanepoel was also a former wheelchair basketball and wheelchair rugby player before switching to swimming.
