= 2023 World Para Swimming Championships =

12th World Para Swimming Championship held in Manchester, UK

- Host city: Manchester
- Date: 31 July to 6 August
- Venue: Manchester Aquatics Centre
- Nations: 70
- Athletes: 549

The 2023 World Para Swimming Championships was the 12th edition of the World Para Swimming Championships, an international swimming competition for swimmers with disabilities. It was held in Manchester, Great Britain from 31 July to 6 August 2023. This was the third time that Great Britain have hosted the World Para Swimming Championships with Glasgow hosting in 2015 and London hosting in 2019.

The World Championships serves as a qualifier for the 2024 Summer Paralympics where two top swimmers in each individual medal event final will be automatically selected to compete at the Paralympics. As a swimmer can only hold one quota, which makes them eligible for all events in their classification for which they have a qualifying time, unrequired quotas are returned to be distributed later.

== Participating nations ==
- Argentina (18)
- Australia (26)
- Austria (4)
- Azerbaijan (3)
- Bahrain (1)
- Belgium (3)
- Bosnia and Herzegovina (2)
- Brazil (29)
- Canada (20)
- Chile (3)
- China (24)
- Chinese Taipei (2)
- Colombia (14)
- Croatia (4)
- Cyprus (1)
- Czech Republic (7)
- Denmark (1)
- Ecuador (1)
- Egypt (5)
- Estonia (3)
- Finland (1)
- France (13)
- Germany (13)
- Great Britain (28) Host country
- Greece (12)
- Hong Kong (7)
- Hungary (7)
- Iceland (3)
- India (2)
- Indonesia (3)
- Iran (3)
- Ireland (5)
- Israel (7)
- Italy (22)
- Japan (21)
- Kazakhstan (5)
- Latvia (1)
- Lithuania (2)
- Malaysia (5)
- Malta (1)
- Mauritius (1)
- Mexico (21)
- Moldova (2)
- Mongolia (1)
- Morocco (1)
- Namibia (1)
- Netherlands (7)
- New Zealand (6)
- Norway (1)
- Peru (2)
- Philippines (3)
- Poland (10)
- Portugal (9)
- Singapore (4)
- Slovakia (3)
- South Africa (6)
- South Korea (5)
- Spain (36)
- Sweden (5)
- Switzerland (3)
- Thailand (7)
- Turkey (5)
- Uganda (1)
- Ukraine (41)
- United States (22)
- Uzbekistan (5)
- Venezuela (1)

== Schedule ==
Purple squares mark final heats scheduled.

Date →		31 Mon	1 Tues	2 Wed	3 Thurs	4 Fri	5 Sat	6 Sun
50m freestyle	Men; Details	S5; S10; S11		S12		S3; S4; S6; S8; S13	S7	S9
50m freestyle	Women; Details	S5; S10; S11		S12		S3; S4; S6; S8; S13	S7	S9
100m freestyle	Men; Details		S4; S6	S13	S8; S9	S11; S12	S10	S3; S5; S7
100m freestyle	Women; Details		S4; S6	S13	S8; S9	S11; S12	S10	S3; S5; S7
200m freestyle	Men; Details	S14			S1; S2		S3; S5	S4
200m freestyle	Women; Details	S14			S2		S3; S5	S4
400m freestyle	Men; Details	S8	S7	S10	S6	S9	S13	S11
400m freestyle	Women; Details	S8	S7	S10	S6	S9	S13	S11
50m backstroke	Men; Details		S5		S3; S4		S1; S2	
50m backstroke	Women; Details		S5		S3; S4		S2	
100m backstroke	Men; Details	S6; S12	S8; S14	S1; S2	S7; S13		S9; S11	S10
100m backstroke	Women; Details	S6; S12	S8; S14	S2	S7; S13		S9; S11	S10
50m breaststroke	Men; Details	SB2; SB3						SB3
50m breaststroke	Women; Details	SB2; SB3						SB3
100m breaststroke	Men; Details	SB4; SB9	SB13	SB7; SB11; SB14	SB12	SB5	SB6	SB8
100m breaststroke	Women; Details	SB4; SB9	SB13	SB7; SB11; SB14	SB12	SB5	SB6	SB8
50m butterfly	Men; Details			S5		S7		S6
50m butterfly	Women; Details			S5		S7		S6
100m butterfly	Men; Details	S13	S11; S12	S8; S9		S10		S14
100m butterfly	Women; Details	S13	S12	S8; S9		S10		S14
150m individual medley	Men; Details		SM3	SM4				
150m individual medley	Women; Details		SM3	SM4				
200m individual medley	Men; Details	SM7	SM9; SM10	SM6	SM5; SM11	SM14	SM8	SM13
200m individual medley	Women; Details	SM7	SM9; SM10	SM6	SM5; SM11	SM14	SM8	SM13
Freestyle relay	Details		Mixed; 4x50m (20pts)		Mixed; 4 × 100 m (S14)		Mixed; 4 × 100 m (49pts)	Mixed; 4 × 100 m (34pts)
Medley relay	Details			Mixed; 4x50m (20pts)	Mixed; 4 × 100 m (49pts)	Mixed; 4x50m (34pts)	Mixed; 4 × 100 m (S14)	

== Multi-medalists ==
List of male and female multi-medalists who have won three gold medals or five medals.

=== Men ===
Name	Nation	Medals	Events
Simone Barlaam	Italy	Gold; Gold; Gold; Gold; Gold; Gold	Men's 100m backstroke S9; Men's 100m butterfly S9; Men's 50m freestyle S9; Men's 100m freestyle S9; Men's 400m freestyle S9; Mixed 4 × 100 m freestyle relay 34pts
Stefano Raimondi	Italy	Gold; Gold; Gold; Gold; Gold; Silver; Silver	Men's 100m backstroke S10; Men's 100m breaststroke SB9; Men's 100m butterfly S10; Men's 200m individual medley SM10; Men's 400m freestyle S10; Men's 100m freestyle S10; Mixed 4 × 100 m medley relay 34pts
Andrii Trusov	Ukraine	Gold; Gold; Gold; Gold; Gold; Bronze	Men's 100m backstroke S7; Men's 50m freestyle S7; Men's 100m freestyle S7; Men's 200m individual medley SM7; Men's 50m butterfly S7; Men's 400m freestyle S7
Guo Jincheng	China	Gold; Gold; Gold; Gold; Silver; Bronze	Men's 200m individual medley SM5; Men's 50m freestyle S5; Mixed 4 × 50 m freestyle relay 20pts Mixed 4 × 50 m medley relay 20pts Men's 50m butterfly S5; Men's 50m backstroke S5
Ami Omer Dadaon	Israel	Gold; Gold; Gold; Gold	Men's 50m freestyle S4; Men's 100m freestyle S4; Men's 200m freestyle S4; Men's 150m individual medley SM4
Denys Ostapchenko	Ukraine	Gold; Gold; Gold; Gold	Men's 50m freestyle S3; Men's 100m freestyle S3; Men's 200m freestyle S3; Men's 50m backstroke S3
Yuan Weiyi	China	Gold; Gold; Gold; Silver; Bronze	Men's 50m Backstroke S5; Mixed 4 × 50 m freestyle relay 20pt Mixed 4 × 50 m medley relay 20pt Men's 50m freestyle S5; Men's 50m butterfly S5
Danylo Chufarov	Ukraine	Gold; Gold; Gold; Silver	Men's 100m butterfly S11; Men's 100m freestyle S11; Men's 200m individual medley SM11; Men's 100m breaststroke SB11
Antonio Fantin	Italy	Gold; Gold; Gold; Silver	Men's 50m freestyle S6; Men's 100m freestyle S6; Mixed 4 × 100 m freestyle relay 34pts Men's 400m freestyle S6
Alex Portal	France	Gold; Gold; Gold; Silver	Men's 100m freestyle S13; Men's 400m freestyle S13; Men's 200m individual medley SM13; Men's 100m butterfly S13
Oleksii Virchenko	Ukraine	Gold; Gold; Gold; Bronze; Bronze; Bronze	Men's 50m freestyle S13; Men's 100m butterfly S13; Mixed 4 × 100 m medley relay 49pts Men's 100m backstroke S13; Men's 100m freestyle S13; Mixed 4 × 100 m freestyle relay 49pts
Gabriel Araújo	Brazil	Gold; Gold; Gold	Men's 50m backstroke S2; Men's 100m backstroke S2; Men's 200m freestyle S2
Rogier Dorsman	Netherlands	Gold; Gold; Silver; Silver; Silver; Bronze	Men's 100m breaststroke SB11; Men's 50m freestyle S11; Men's 100m freestyle S11; Men's 200m individual medley SM11; Men's 400m freestyle S11; Men's 100m backstroke S11
Federico Bicelli	Italy	Gold; Gold; Silver; Silver; Bronze	Men's 400m freestyle S7; Mixed 4 × 100 m freestyle relay 34pts Men's 100m freestyle S7; Mixed 4 × 100 m medley relay 34pts Men's 100m backstroke S7
Carlos Serrano Zárate	Colombia	Gold; Silver; Silver; Silver; Bronze	Men's 100m breaststroke SB8; Men's 200m individual medley SM7; Men's 50m butterfly S7; Men's 50m freestyle S7; Men's 100m freestyle S7

=== Women ===
Name	Nation	Medals	Events
Maria Carolina Gomes Santiago	Brazil	Gold; Gold; Gold; Gold; Gold; Silver; Bronze; Bronze	Mixed 4 × 100 m freestyle relay 49pts Women's 100m backstroke S12; Women's 100m butterfly S12; Women's 50m freestyle S12; Women's 100m freestyle S12; Women's 100m breaststroke SB12; Women's 200m individual medley SM13; Mixed 4 × 100 m medley relay 49pts
Carlotta Gilli	Italy	Gold; Gold; Gold; Gold; Silver; Silver	Women's 100m butterfly S13; Women's 100m freestyle S13; Women's 400m freestyle S13; Women's 200m individual medley SM13; Women's 100m backstroke S13; Women's 50m freestyle S13
Jiang Yuyan	China	Gold; Gold; Gold; Gold; Silver; Silver	Mixed 4 × 50 m medley relay 20pts Women's 100m freestyle S6; Women's 400m freestyle S6; Women's 50m butterfly S6; Women's 100m backstroke S6; Women's 50m freestyle S6
Tanja Scholz	Germany	Gold; Gold; Gold; Silver; Silver; Silver	Women's 50m freestyle S4; Women's 100m freestyle S4; Women's 150m individual medley SM3; Women's 200m freestyle S5; Women's 50m backstroke S4; Women's 50m breaststroke SB2
Ellie Challis	Great Britain	Gold; Gold; Gold; Silver; Silver; Bronze	Women's 200m freestyle S3; Women's 50m backstroke S3; Women's 50m breaststroke SB2; Women's 50m Freestyle S3; Women's 100m Freestyle S3; Women's 150m individual medley SM3
Lu Dong	China	Gold; Gold; Gold; Bronze; Bronze	Mixed 4 × 50 m freestyle relay 20pts Women's 50m backstroke S5; Women's 50m butterfly S5; Women's 200m individual medley SM5; Women's 50m freestyle S5
Bianka Pap	Hungary	Gold; Gold; Gold; Bronze	Women's 100m backstroke S10; Women's 200m individual medley SM10; Women's 400m freestyle S10; Women's 100m freestyle S10
Monica Boggioni	Italy	Gold; Gold; Gold	Women's 100m freestyle S5; Women's 200m freestyle S5; Women's 50m breaststroke SB3
Xenia Palazzo	Italy	Gold; Gold; Silver; Silver; Silver; Bronze	Mixed 4 × 100 m freestyle relay 34pts Women's 400m freestyle S8; Mixed 4 × 100 m medley relay 34pts Women's 100m backstroke S8; Women's 100m freestyle S8; Women's 200m individual medley SM8
Marta Fernández Infante	Spain	Gold; Gold; Silver; Bronze; Bronze	Women's 50m freestyle S3; Women's 100m freestyle S3; Women's 150m individual medley SM3; Mixed 4 × 50 m medley relay 20pts Women's 50m breaststroke SB3
Poppy Maskill	Great Britain	Gold; Silver; Silver; Silver; Bronze	Mixed 4 × 100 m freestyle relay S14; Mixed 4 × 100 m medley relay S14; Women's 100m backstroke S14; Women's 100m butterfly S14; Women's 200m individual medley SM14
Anna Hontar	Ukraine	Gold; Silver; Silver; Bronze; Bronze; Bronze	Women's 50m freestyle S6; Mixed 4 × 50 m medley relay 20pts Women's 100m freestyle S6; Mixed 4 × 50 m freestyle relay 20pts Women's 100m backstroke S6; Women's 100m breaststroke SB5
Anna Stetsenko	Ukraine	Gold; Silver; Silver; Bronze; Bronze; Bronze	Mixed 4 × 100 m medley relay 49pts Women's 50m freestyle S12; Women's 100m freestyle S12; Mixed 4 × 100 m freestyle relay 49pts Women's 400m freestyle S13
Mariana Ribeiro	Brazil	Gold; Silver; Bronze; Bronze; Bronze	Women's 50m freestyle S9; Women's 100m freestyle S9; Mixed 4 × 100 m medley relay 34pts Mixed 4 × 100 m freestyle relay 34pts Women's 100m backstroke S9
Olivia Chambers	United States	Silver; Silver; Bronze; Bronze; Bronze; Bronze	Women's 200m individual medley SM13; Women's 400m freestyle S13; Women's 100m breaststroke SB13; Women's 100m butterfly S13; Women's 50m freestyle S13; Women's 100m freestyle S13

== Medal table ==
* Host nation (Great Britain)

2023 World Para Swimming Championships medal table
Rank	Nation	Gold	Silver	Bronze	Total
1	Italy (ITA)	26	15	11	52
2	Ukraine (UKR)	20	13	22	55
3	China (CHN)	18	20	13	51
4	Brazil (BRA)	16	11	19	46
5	Great Britain (GBR)*	14	14	10	38
6	Australia (AUS)	9	7	14	30
7	Canada (CAN)	9	4	6	19
8	Spain (ESP)	6	13	9	28
9	Netherlands (NED)	6	10	3	19
10	United States (USA)	6	7	12	25
11	Germany (GER)	6	7	4	17
12	France (FRA)	4	6	6	16
13	Israel (ISR)	4	1	3	8
14	Hungary (HUN)	4	1	2	7
15	Colombia (COL)	3	6	2	11
16	Poland (POL)	2	3	2	7
17	Azerbaijan (AZE)	2	1	2	5
18	South Africa (RSA)	2	1	1	4
19	Greece (GRE)	2	0	0	2
19	Singapore (SGP)	2	0	0	2
21	Mexico (MEX)	1	6	6	13
22	Japan (JPN)	1	4	5	10
23	New Zealand (NZL)	1	2	2	5
24	Ireland (IRL)	1	2	0	3
25	Hong Kong (HKG)	1	1	0	2
25	South Korea (KOR)	1	1	0	2
27	Czech Republic (CZE)	1	0	2	3
28	Cyprus (CYP)	1	0	1	2
29	Chile (CHL)	0	2	1	3
30	Croatia (CRO)	0	2	0	2
30	Portugal (POR)	0	2	0	2
30	Uzbekistan (UZB)	0	2	0	2
33	Argentina (ARG)	0	1	5	6
34	Switzerland (SUI)	0	1	2	3
35	Denmark (DEN)	0	1	1	2
36	Kazakhstan (KAZ)	0	1	0	1
36	Norway (NOR)	0	1	0	1
38	Turkey (TUR)	0	0	2	2
39	Austria (AUT)	0	0	1	1
Totals (39 entries)		169	169	169	507

== See also ==
- 2023 World Aquatics Championships in Fukuoka, Japan
