= 2022 World Para Swimming Championships =

Swimming competition

- Host city: Madeira
- Date: 12–18 June
- Venue: Penteada Olympic Swimming Complex
- Nations participating: 59
- Athletes participating: 488

The 2022 World Para Swimming Championships was the 11th edition of the World Para Swimming Championships, an international swimming competition for athletes with a disability. It was held in Madeira from 12 to 18 June.

The competition was originally scheduled to be held in 2021, however, it was moved to the summer of 2022 due to the postponement of the Paralympic Games in Tokyo from 2020 to 2021. The event featured 488 athletes from 59 countries.

== Participating nations ==
Russia and Belarus were banned from attending all international competitions due to the 2022 Russian invasion of Ukraine. China also did not compete.

- Argentina (19)
- Australia (20)
- Austria (4)
- Azerbaijan (2)
- Belgium (3)
- Brazil (29)
- Canada (30)
- Chile (6)
- Colombia (11)
- Costa Rica (1)
- Croatia (3)
- Cyprus (1)
- Czech Republic (8)
- Denmark (1)
- Dominican Republic (2)
- Ecuador (1)
- Egypt (5)
- Estonia (2)
- Finland (4)
- France (12)
- Georgia (2)
- Germany (11)
- Great Britain (28)
- Greece (12)
- Hungary (7)
- Iceland (5)
- India (6)
- Ireland (5)
- Israel (6)
- Italy (23)
- Japan (16)
- Kazakhstan (4)
- Kyrgyzstan (2)
- Latvia (1)
- Lithuania (2)
- Malaysia (2)
- Mexico (26)
- Namibia (1)
- Netherlands (8)
- New Zealand (5)
- Norway (1)
- Panama (1)
- Peru (2)
- Poland (13)
- Portugal (10)
- Serbia (1)
- Singapore (4)
- Slovakia (3)
- South Africa (4)
- South Korea (4)
- Spain (37)
- Sweden (5)
- Switzerland (2)
- Thailand (6)
- Turkey (7)
- Ukraine (23)
- United States (23)
- Uzbekistan (5)
- Venezuela (2)

== Schedule ==
Purple squares mark final heats scheduled.

| Date → | | 12 Sun | 13 Mon | 14 Tues | 15 Wed | 16 Thurs | 17 Fri | 18 Sat |
|---|---|---|---|---|---|---|---|---|
| 50m freestyle | Men; Details | S5; S10; S11 | | S12 | | S3; S4; S6; S8; S13 | S7 | S9 |
| 50m freestyle | Women; Details | S5; S10; S11 | | S12 | | S3; S4; S6; S8; S13 | S7 | S9 |
| 100m freestyle | Men; Details | | S4; S6 | S13 | S8; S9 | S11; S12 | S10 | S3; S5; S7 |
| 100m freestyle | Women; Details | | S4; S6 | S13 | S8; S9 | S11; S12 | S10 | S3; S5; S7 |
| 200m freestyle | Men; Details | S14 | | | S2 | | S3; S5 | S4 |
| 200m freestyle | Women; Details | S14 | | | | | S5 | S4 |
| 400m freestyle | Men; Details | S8 | S7 | S10 | S6 | S9 | S13 | S11 |
| 400m freestyle | Women; Details | S8 | S7 | S10 | S6 | S9 | S13 | S11 |
| 50m backstroke | Men; Details | | S5 | | S3; S4 | | S1; S2 | |
| 50m backstroke | Women; Details | | S5 | | S3; S4 | | S2 | |
| 100m backstroke | Men; Details | S6; S12 | S8; S14 | S1; S2 | S7; S13 | | S9; S11 | S10 |
| 100m backstroke | Women; Details | S6; S12 | S8; S14 | S2 | S7; S13 | | S9; S11 | S10 |
| 50m breaststroke | Men; Details | SB2; SB3 | | | | | | SB3 |
| 50m breaststroke | Women; Details | SB2; SB3 | | | | | | SB3 |
| 100m breaststroke | Men; Details | SB4; SB9 | SB13 | SB7; SB11; SB14 | SB12 | | SB6 | SB8 |
| 100m breaststroke | Women; Details | SB4; SB9 | SB13 | SB7; SB11; SB14 | SB12 | SB5 | SB6 | SB8 |
| 50m butterfly | Men; Details | | | S5 | | S7 | | S6; S14 |
| 50m butterfly | Women; Details | | | S5 | | S7 | | S6; S14 |
| 100m butterfly | Men; Details | S13 | S11; S12 | S8; S9 | | S10 | | |
| 100m butterfly | Women; Details | S13 | | S8; S9 | | S10 | | |
| 150m individual medley | Men; Details | | SM3 | SM4 | | | | |
| 150m individual medley | Women; Details | | SM3 | | | | | |
| 200m individual medley | Men; Details | SM7 | SM9; SM10 | SM6 | SM5; SM11 | SM14 | SM8 | SM13 |
| 200m individual medley | Women; Details | SM7 | SM9; SM10 | SM6 | SM5; SM11 | SM14 | SM8 | SM13 |
| Freestyle relay | Details | | Mixed; 4x50m (20pts) | | Mixed; 4 × 100 m (S14) | | Mixed; 4 × 100 m (49pts) | Mixed; 4 × 100 m (34pts) |
| Medley relay | Details | | | Mixed; 4x50m (20pts) | Mixed; 4 × 100 m (49pts) | Mixed; 4x50m (34pts) | Mixed; 4 × 100 m (S14) | |

== Multi-medalists ==
List of male and female multi-medalists who have won three gold medals or five medals.

=== Men ===
| Name | Nation | Medals | Events |
|---|---|---|---|
| Stefano Raimondi | Italy | Gold; Gold; Gold; Gold; Gold; Gold; Silver; Bronze | Men's 100m backstroke S10; Men's 100m breaststroke SB9; Men's 100m butterfly S10; Men's 200m individual medley SM10; Men's 400m freestyle S10; Mixed 4 × 100m freestyle relay 34pts Men's 100m freestyle S10; Men's 50m freestyle S10 |
| Rogier Dorsman | Netherlands | Gold; Gold; Gold; Gold; Gold; Silver; Silver | Men's 100m breaststroke SB11; Men's 200m individual medley SM11; Men's 50m freestyle S11; Men's 100m freestyle S11; Men's 400m freestyle S11; Men's 100m butterfly S11; Men's 100m backstroke S11 |
| Samuel da Silva de Oliveira | Brazil | Gold; Gold; Gold; Silver; Silver | Men's 50m backstroke S5; Men's 50m butterfly S5; Mixed 4 × 50m freestyle relay 20pts Men's 200m individual medley SM55; Men's 50m freestyle S5 |
| Antonio Fantin | Italy | Gold; Gold; Gold; Gold; Bronze; Bronze | Men's 50m freestyle S6; Men's 100m freestyle S6; Men's 400m freestyle S6; Men's 100m backstroke S6; Mixed 4 × 50m freestyle Relay 20pts |
| Robert Griswold | United States | Gold; Gold; Gold; Silver; Bronze | Men's 100m backstroke S8; Men's 100m butterfly S8; Men's 200m individual medley SM8; Men's 100m freestyle S8; Men's 400m freestyle S8 |
| Simone Barlaam | Italy | Gold; Gold; Gold; Gold; Gold; Gold | Men's 100m backstroke S9; Men's 100m butterfly S9; Men's 50m freestyle S9; Men's 100m freestyle S9; Men's 400m freestyle S9; Mixed 4 × 100m freestyle relay 34pts |
| Andrii Trusov | Ukraine | Gold; Gold; Gold; Gold; Bronze; Bronze | Men's 100m backstroke S7; Men's 50m butterfly S7; Men's 50m freestyle S7; Men's 100m freestyle S7; Men's 200m individual medley SM7; Men's 400m freestyle S7 |
| Gabriel Bandeira | Brazil | Gold; Gold; Gold; Silver; Bronze; Bronze | Men's 100m butterfly S14; Men's 200m freestyle S14; Men's 200m individual medley SM14; Men's 100m backstroke S14; Mixed 4 × 100m freestyle relay S14; Mixed 4 × 100m medley relay S14 |
| Jesús Hernández Hernández | Mexico | Gold; Gold; Gold; Silver; Silver; Bronze | Men's 150m individual medley SM3; Men's 100m freestyle S3; Men's 200m freestyle S3; Men's 50m backstroke S3; Men's 50m freestyle S3; Men's 50m breaststroke SB2 |
| Francesco Bocciardo | Italy | Gold; Gold; Gold; Silver | Men's 100m freestyle S5; Men's 200m freestyle S5; Men's 50m freestyle S5; Mixed 4 × 50m medley relay 20pts |
| Ami Omer Dadaon | Israel | Gold; Gold; Gold | Men's 150m individual medley SM4; Men's 200m freestyle S4; Men's 50m freestyle S4 |
| Gabriel Araújo | Brazil | Gold; Gold; Gold | Men's 50m backstroke S2; Men's 100m backstroke S2; Men's 200m freestyle S2 |
| Antoni Ponce Bertran | Spain | Gold; Gold; Silver; Silver; Silver; Bronze | Men's 100m breaststroke SB5; Men's 200m individual medley SM5; Men's 100m freestyle S5; Men's 200m freestyle S5; Men's 50m backstroke S5; Mixed 4 × 50m medley relay 20pts |
| Nelson Crispín | Colombia | Gold; Gold; Silver; Silver; Silver | Men's 100m breaststroke SB6; Men's 200m individual medley SM6; Men's 100m freestyle S6; Men's 50m butterfly S6; Men's 50m freestyle S6 |
| Carlos Serrano Zárate | Colombia | Gold; Gold; Silver; Silver; Bronze | Men's 100m breaststroke SB7; Men's 200m individual medley SM7; Men's 50m butterfly S7; Men's 50m freestyle S7; Men's 100m freestyle S7 |

=== Women ===
| Name | Nation | Medals | Events |
|---|---|---|---|
| Leanne Smith | United States | Gold; Gold; Gold; Gold; Gold; Gold; Gold | Women's 150m individual medley SM3; Women's 50m backstroke S3; Women's 50m breaststroke S3; Women's 50m freestyle S3; Women's 100m freestyle S3; Mixed 4 × 50m medley relay 20pts Mixed 4 × 100m medley relay S14 |
| Maria Carolina Gomes Santiago | Brazil | Gold; Gold; Gold; Gold; Gold; Gold; Silver | Women's 100m breaststroke SB12; Women's 100m butterfly S12; Women's 50m freestyle S12; Women's 100m freestyle S12; Mixed 4 × 100m medley relay 49pts Mixed 4 × 100m freestyle relay 49pts Women's 100m backstroke S12 |
| Bethany Firth | Great Britain | Gold; Gold; Gold; Gold; Gold | Women's 100m backstroke S14; Women's 200m freestyle S14; Mixed 4 × 100m freestyle relay S14; Mixed 4 × 100m medley relay S14; Women's 200m individual medley SM14 |
| Xenia Palazzo | Italy | Gold; Gold; Gold; Gold; Silver; Silver | Mixed 4 × 100m freestyle relay 34pts Women's 100m backstroke S8; Women's 100m freestyle S8; Women's 200m individual medley SM8; Women's 50m freestyle S8; Women's 400m freestyle S8 |
| Tanja Scholz | Germany | Gold; Gold; Gold; Silver; Silver | Women's 100m freestyle S4; Women's 200m freestyle S4; Women's 50m freestyle S4; Women's 150m individual medley SM3; Women's 50m backstroke S4 |
| McKenzie Coan | United States | Gold; Gold; Gold; Silver; Bronze | Women's 100m freestyle S7; Women's 400m freestyle S7; Women's 50m freestyle S7; Mixed 4 × 100m freestyle relay 34pts Women's 100m backstroke S7 |
| Lisa Kruger | Netherlands | Gold; Gold; Gold; Bronze; Bronze | Women's 100m breaststroke SB9; Women's 100m butterfly S10; Women's 200m individual medley SM10; Women's 100m freestyle S10; Mixed 4 × 100m medley relay 34pts |
| Maisie Summers-Newton | Great Britain | Gold; Gold; Gold | Women's 100m breaststroke SB6; Women's 200m individual medley SM6; Women's 400m freestyle S6 |
| Tully Kearney | Great Britain | Gold; Gold; Gold | Women's 50m freestyle S5; Women's 100m freestyle S5; Women's 200m freestyle S5 |
| Anastasia Pagonis | United States | Gold; Gold; Gold | Women's 100m freestyle S11; Women's 200m individual medley SM11; Women's 400m freestyle S11 |
| Gia Pergolini | United States | Gold; Gold; Silver; Silver; Bronze | Women's 100m backstroke S13; Women's 100m freestyle S13; Women's 100m butterfly S13; Women's 50m freestyle S13; Women's 200m individual medley SM13 |
| Monica Boggioni | Italy | Gold; Silver; Silver; Bronze; Bronze; Bronze | Women's 200m individual medley SM5; Women's 100m breaststroke SB4; Mixed 4 × 50m medley relay 20pts Women's 50m backstroke S5; Women's 50m freestyle S5; Mixed 4 × 50m freestyle relay 20pts |

== Medal table ==
The medal table as of day 7.

* Host nation (Portugal)

2022 World Para Swimming Championships medal table
| Rank | Nation | Gold | Silver | Bronze | Total |
|---|---|---|---|---|---|
| 1 | Italy (ITA) | 27 | 24 | 13 | 64 |
| 2 | United States (USA) | 24 | 9 | 7 | 40 |
| 3 | Brazil (BRA) | 19 | 10 | 24 | 53 |
| 4 | Great Britain (GBR) | 17 | 13 | 8 | 38 |
| 5 | Ukraine (UKR) | 13 | 10 | 13 | 36 |
| 6 | Netherlands (NED) | 8 | 7 | 6 | 21 |
| 7 | Australia (AUS) | 7 | 15 | 9 | 31 |
| 8 | Spain (ESP) | 7 | 11 | 11 | 29 |
| 9 | Colombia (COL) | 6 | 9 | 3 | 18 |
| 10 | Mexico (MEX) | 6 | 6 | 13 | 25 |
| 11 | Canada (CAN) | 6 | 5 | 7 | 18 |
| 12 | Germany (GER) | 4 | 6 | 4 | 14 |
| 13 | Hungary (HUN) | 4 | 3 | 2 | 9 |
| 14 | Japan (JPN) | 3 | 5 | 12 | 20 |
| 15 | Greece (GRE) | 3 | 3 | 1 | 7 |
| 16 | Azerbaijan (AZE) | 3 | 2 | 0 | 5 |
| 17 | Israel (ISR) | 3 | 1 | 1 | 5 |
| 18 | France (FRA) | 2 | 8 | 2 | 12 |
| 19 | Singapore (SGP) | 2 | 1 | 0 | 3 |
| 20 | Cyprus (CYP) | 2 | 0 | 0 | 2 |
| 21 | New Zealand (NZL) | 1 | 4 | 0 | 5 |
| 22 | Argentina (ARG) | 1 | 3 | 4 | 8 |
| 23 | Turkey (TUR) | 1 | 2 | 2 | 5 |
| 24 | Chile (CHI) | 1 | 2 | 1 | 4 |
| 25 | Croatia (CRO) | 1 | 0 | 0 | 1 |
| 25 | Czech Republic (CZE) | 1 | 0 | 0 | 1 |
| 27 | Poland (POL) | 0 | 2 | 3 | 5 |
| 28 | South Africa (RSA) | 0 | 2 | 2 | 4 |
| 29 | Ireland (IRL) | 0 | 1 | 4 | 5 |
| 30 | Kazakhstan (KAZ) | 0 | 1 | 2 | 3 |
| 30 | Portugal (POR)* | 0 | 1 | 2 | 3 |
| 30 | Switzerland (SUI) | 0 | 1 | 2 | 3 |
| 30 | Uzbekistan (UZB) | 0 | 1 | 2 | 3 |
| 34 | Austria (AUT) | 0 | 1 | 1 | 2 |
| 34 | Lithuania (LTU) | 0 | 1 | 1 | 2 |
| 36 | Iceland (ISL) | 0 | 1 | 0 | 1 |
| 36 | Norway (NOR) | 0 | 1 | 0 | 1 |
| 36 | South Korea (KOR) | 0 | 1 | 0 | 1 |
| 39 | Denmark (DEN) | 0 | 0 | 2 | 2 |
| 39 | Slovakia (SVK) | 0 | 0 | 2 | 2 |
| 41 | Belgium (BEL) | 0 | 0 | 1 | 1 |
| 41 | Egypt (EGY) | 0 | 0 | 1 | 1 |
| 41 | Malaysia (MAS) | 0 | 0 | 1 | 1 |
| Totals (43 entries) | | 172 | 173 | 169 | 514 |
