= 2020 World Para Swimming European Open Championships – Women's 100 metre freestyle =

The women's 100m freestyle events at the 2020 World Para Swimming European Open Championships were held at the Penteada Olympic Pools Complex.

== Medalists ==
Event	Gold	Silver	Bronze
S4	Arjola Trimi; Italy	Marta Fernandez Infante; Spain	Gina Böttcher; Germany
S5	Monica Boggioni; Italy	Sumeyye Boyaci; Turkey	Sevilay Ozturk; Turkey
S6	Yelyzaveta Mereshko; Ukraine	Nora Meister; Switzerland	Eleanor Robinson; Great Britain
S7	Giulia Terzi; Italy	Denise Grahl; Germany	Anna Hontar; Ukraine
S8	Xenia Palazzo; Italy	Viktoriia Ishchiulova; Russia	Nahia Zudaire Borrezo; Spain
S9	Sarai Gascon; Spain	Susana Veiga; Portugal	Nuria Marques Soto; Spain
S10	Bianka Pap; Hungary	Alessia Scortechini; Italy	Oliwia Jablonska; Poland
S11	Sofiia Polikarpova; Russia	Maryna Piddubna; Ukraine	Kateryna Tkachuk; Ukraine
S12	Daria Pikalova; Russia	Alessia Berra; Italy	Maria Delgado Nadal; Spain
S13	Carlotta Gilli; Italy	Anna Stetsenko; Ukraine	Anna Krivshina; Russia
S14	Jessica-Jane Applegate; Great Britain	Pernilla Lindberg; Sweden	Michelle Alonso Morales; Spain

== Results ==
=== S4 ===
Heat 1

Rank	Name	Nationality	Time	Notes
1	Gina Böttcher	Germany	1:36.59	Q
2	Arjola Trimi	Italy	1:37.69	Q
3	Marta Fernandez Infante	Spain	1:39.95	Q
4	Olga Sviderska	Ukraine	1:44.49	Q
5	Nataliia Butkova	Russia	1:44.71	Q
6	Zulfiya Gabidullina	Kazakhstan	1:48.52	Q
7	Alexandra Stamatopoulou	Greece	1:53.55	Q
8	Iuliia Shishova	Russia	1:58.41	Q
9	Yuliia Safonova	Ukraine	2:00.50	
10	Maryna Verbova	Ukraine	2:02.23	

Final

Rank	Name	Nationality	Time	Notes
1st place, gold medalist(s)	Arjola Trimi	Italy	1:31.46	ER
2nd place, silver medalist(s)	Marta Fernandez Infante	Spain	1:32.18	
3rd place, bronze medalist(s)	Gina Böttcher	Germany	1:34.76	
4	Nataliia Butkova	Russia	1:38.54	
5	Olga Sviderska	Ukraine	1:46.72	
6	Zulfiya Gabidullina	Kazakhstan	1:50.48	
7	Alexandra Stamatopoulou	Greece	1:54.47	
8	Iuliia Shishova	Russia	1:59.19	

=== S5 ===
Final

Rank	Name	Nationality	Time	Notes
1st place, gold medalist(s)	Monica Boggioni	Italy	1:23.57	
2nd place, silver medalist(s)	Sumeyye Boyaci	Turkey	1:34.24	
3rd place, bronze medalist(s)	Sevilay Ozturk	Turkey	1:39.94	
4	Dunia Felices	Peru	1:57.25	

=== S6 ===
Final

Rank	Name	Nationality	Time	Notes
1st place, gold medalist(s)	Yelyzaveta Mereshko	Ukraine	1:12.16	
2nd place, silver medalist(s)	Nora Meister	Switzerland	1:15.28	
3rd place, bronze medalist(s)	Eleanor Robinson	Great Britain	1:18.52	
4	Fanni Illés	Hungary	1:24.48	
5	Viktoriia Savtsova	Ukraine	1:24.55	
6	Maria Tsakona	Greece	1:29.92	
7	Evelin Szaraz	Hungary	1:35.32	
8	Agata Koupilova	Czech Republic	1:37.55	
9	Maja Theuma	Malta	2:21.99	

=== S7 ===
Heats

Rank	Heat	Name	Nationality	Time	Notes
1	1	Denise Grahl	Germany	1:13.09	Q
2	2	Giulia Terzi	Italy	1:13.94	Q
3	2	Anna Hontar	Ukraine	1:14.95	Q
4	1	Erel Halevi	Israel	1:18.55	Q
5	2	Agnes Kramer	Sweden	1:21.05	Q
6	2	Sabine Weber-Treiber	Austria	1:22.60	Q
7	2	Milana Shchelokova	Russia	1:24.60	Q
8	2	Iryna Anisimova	Ukraine	1:24.82	Q
9	2	Nicola St Clair Maitland	Sweden	1:25.15	
10	1	Meri-Maari Makinen	Finland	1:26.56	
11	1	Nil Sahin	Turkey	1:27.30	
12	2	Ida Andersson Wulf	Sweden	1:27.54	
13	1	Katherina Roesler	Germany	1:36.26	

Final

Rank	Name	Nationality	Time	Notes
1st place, gold medalist(s)	Giulia Terzi	Italy	1:10.48	ER
2nd place, silver medalist(s)	Denise Grahl	Germany	1:11.92	
3rd place, bronze medalist(s)	Anna Hontar	Ukraine	1:14.38	
4	Erel Halevi	Israel	1:18.13	
5	Agnes Kramer	Sweden	1:20.86	
6	Sabine Weber-Treiber	Austria	1:23.67	
7	Iryna Anisimova	Ukraine	1:24.14	
8	Milana Shchelokova	Russia	1:37.77	

=== S8 ===
Final

Rank	Name	Nationality	Time	Notes
1st place, gold medalist(s)	Xenia Francesca Palazzo	Italy	1:05.83	
2nd place, silver medalist(s)	Viktoriia Ishchiulova	Russia	1:08.86	
3rd place, bronze medalist(s)	Nahia Zudaire Borrezo	Spain	1:09.31	
4	Mariia Pavlova	Russia	1:09.67	
5	Mira Jeanne Maack	Germany	1:11.94	
6	Jade Le Bris	France	1:13.01	
7	Amalie Vinther	Denmark	1:13.37	
8	Vendula Duskova	Czech Republic	1:15.34	

=== S9 ===
Heats

Rank	Heat	Name	Nationality	Time	Notes
1	2	Susana Veiga	Portugal	1:05.14	Q
2	2	Sarai Gascon	Spain	1:05.21	Q
3	2	Claire Supiot	France	1:06.24	Q
4	1	Nuria Marques Soto	Spain	1:06.66	Q
5	2	Vittoria Bianco	Italy	1:07.41	Q
6	1	Yuliya Gordiychuk	Israel	1:08.22	Q
7	1	Lina Watz	Sweden	1:08.34	Q
8	1	Stephanie Millward	United Kingdom	1:08.58	Q
9	2	Kata Payer	Hungary	1:10.35	
10	1	Efthymia Gkouli	Greece	1:11.33	
11	2	Zuzanna Boruszewska	Poland	1:12.26	
12	1	Paula Novina	Croatia	1:16.21	

Final

Rank	Name	Nationality	Time	Notes
1st place, gold medalist(s)	Sarai Gascon	Spain	1:02.93	
2nd place, silver medalist(s)	Susana Veiga	Portugal	1:04.33	
3rd place, bronze medalist(s)	Nuria Marques Soto	Spain	1:05.26	
4	Vittoria Bianco	Italy	1:06.31	
5	Claire Supiot	France	1:06.51	
6	Stephanie Millward	United Kingdom	1:07.59	
7	Lina Watz	Sweden	1:08.31	
8	Yuliya Gordiychuk	Israel	1:08.99	

=== S10 ===
Heat 1

Rank	Name	Nationality	Time	Notes
1	Bianka Pap	Hungary	1:03.02	Q
2	Emeline Pierre	France	1:04.36	Q
3	Oliwia Jablonska	Poland	1:04.53	Q
4	Susannah Kaul	Estonia	1:05.02	Q
5	Alessia Scortechini	Italy	1:05.04	Q
6	Julia Benito de Tena	Spain	1:06.33	Q
7	Cosima Reinicke	Germany	1:06.76	Q
8	Francisca Castro	Spain	1:08.14	Q
9	Jenna Rajahalme	Finland	1:10.04	

Final

Rank	Name	Nationality	Time	Notes
1st place, gold medalist(s)	Bianka Pap	Hungary	1:01.20	
2nd place, silver medalist(s)	Alessia Scortechini	Italy	1:02.78	
3rd place, bronze medalist(s)	Oliwia Jablonska	Poland	1:03.34	
4	Susannah Kaul	Estonia	1:04.11	
5	Emeline Pierre	France	1:04.19	
6	Julia Benito de Tena	Spain	1:06.09	
7	Cosima Reinicke	Germany	1:06.62	
8	Francisca Castro	Spain	1:12.35	

=== S11 ===
Final

Rank	Name	Nationality	Time	Notes
1st place, gold medalist(s)	Sofiia Polikarpova	Russia	1:11.13	
2nd place, silver medalist(s)	Maryna Piddubna	Ukraine	1:11.75	
3rd place, bronze medalist(s)	Kateryna Tkachuk	Ukraine	1:14.95	
4	Martina Rabbolini	Italy	1:19.01	
5	Viktoryia Lukashevich	Belarus	1:31.11	
—	Tatiana Blattnerova	Slovakia	DSQ	

=== S12 ===
Heat 1

Rank	Name	Nationality	Time	Notes
1	Daria Pikalova	Russia	1:00.68	Q
2	Maria Delgado Nadal	Spain	1:03.55	Q
3	Mariia Latritskaia	Russia	1:05.73	Q
4	Alessia Berra	Italy	1:06.01	Q
5	Belkys Mota	Venezuela	1:07.87	Q
6	Yaryna Matlo	Ukraine	1:09.94	Q
7	Neele Labudda	Germany	1:11.02	Q
8	Katarina Chuda	Slovakia	1:12.01	Q
9	Aliya Rakhimbekova	Kazakhstan	1:14.91	

Final

Rank	Name	Nationality	Time	Notes
1st place, gold medalist(s)	Daria Pikalova	Russia	59.00	
2nd place, silver medalist(s)	Alessia Berra	Italy	1:00.52	
3rd place, bronze medalist(s)	Maria Delgado Nadal	Spain	1:01.98	
4	Mariia Latritskaia	Russia	1:02.59	
5	Belkys Mota	Venezuela	1:06.51	
6	Neele Labudda	Germany	1:08.37	
7	Yaryna Matlo	Ukraine	1:10.24	
8	Katarina Chuda	Slovakia	1:12.21	

=== S13 ===
Heat 1

Rank	Name	Nationality	Time	Notes
1	Carlotta Gilli	Italy	1:00.33	Q
2	Anna Stetsenko	Ukraine	1:00.72	Q
3	Anna Krivshina	Russia	1:01.16	Q
4	Roisin Ni Riain	Ireland	1:03.25	Q
5	Marian Polo Lopez	Spain	1:03.28	Q
6	Ariadna Edo Beltran	Spain	1:04.01	Q
7	Joanna Mendak	Poland	1:04.70	Q
8	Aleksandra Ziablitseva	Russia	1:05.11	Q
9	Abby Kane	Great Britain	1:09.99	

Final

Rank	Name	Nationality	Time	Notes
1st place, gold medalist(s)	Carlotta Gilli	Italy	58.63	
2nd place, silver medalist(s)	Anna Stetsenko	Ukraine	58.98	
3rd place, bronze medalist(s)	Anna Krivshina	Russia	59.45	
4	Roisin Ni Riain	Ireland	1:02.72	
5	Marian Polo Lopez	Spain	1:02.83	
6	Aleksandra Ziablitseva	Russia	1:04.01	
7	Ariadna Edo Beltran	Spain	1:04.41	
8	Joanna Mendak	Poland	1:06.09	

=== S14 ===
Final

Rank	Name	Nationality	Time	Notes
1st place, gold medalist(s)	Jessica-Jane Applegate	United Kingdom	1:00.91	
2nd place, silver medalist(s)	Pernilla Lindberg	Sweden	1:02.14	
3rd place, bronze medalist(s)	Michelle Alonso Morales	Spain	1:02.16	
4	Eva Coronado Tejeda	Spain	1:02.88	
5	Janina Falk	Austria	1:04.23	
6	Olga Poteshkina	Russia	1:05.47	
7	Maely Chevallier	France	1:10.46	
