= 2020 World Para Swimming European Open Championships – Women's 50 metre freestyle =

The women's 50m freestyle events at the 2020 World Para Swimming European Open Championships were held at the Penteada Olympic Pools Complex.

== Medalists ==
Event	Gold	Silver	Bronze
S4	Arjola Trimi; Italy	Marta Fernandez Infante; Spain	Nataliia Butkova; Russia
S5	Teresa Perales; Spain	Monica Boggioni; Italy	Sevilay Ozturk; Turkey
S6	Yelyzaveta Mereshko; Ukraine	Viktoriia Savtsova; Ukraine	Nicole Turner; Ireland
S7	Giulia Terzi; Italy	Denise Grahl; Germany	Anna Hontar; Ukraine
S8	Viktoriia Ishchiulova; Russia	Xenia Francesca Palazzo; Italy	Mariia Pavlova; Russia
S9	Susana Veiga; Portugal	Sarai Gascon; Spain	Nuria Marqués Soto; Spain
S10	Alessia Scortechini; Italy	Susannah Kaul; Estonia	Emeline Pierre; France
S11	Maryna Piddubna; Ukraine	Sofiia Polikarpova; Russia	Kateryna Tkachuk; Ukraine
S12	Daria Pikalova; Russia	Mariia Latritskaia; Russia	Alessia Berra; Italy
S13	Anna Krivshina; Russia	Carlotta Gilli; Italy	Anna Stetsenko; Ukraine

== Results ==
=== S4 ===
Heats

Rank	Heat	Name	Nationality	Time	Notes
1	2	Arjola Trimi	Italy	44.43	Q
2	1	Nataliia Butkova	Russia	44.91	Q
3	1	Marta Fernandez Infante	Spain	45.11	Q
4	2	Gina Böttcher	Germany	46.48	Q
5	2	Alexandra Stamatopoulou	Greece	48.31	Q
6	2	Olga Sviderska	Ukraine	48.48	Q
7	1	Zulfiya Gabidullina	Kazakhstan	50.71	Q
8	2	Yuliia Safonova	Ukraine	57.76	Q
9	1	Natalia Gavrilyuk	Russia	1:07.81	
10	1	Iuliia Shishova	Russia	1:08.66	
11	2	Dominika Mickova	Czech Republic	1:09.94	
12	1	Elif Ildem	Turkey	1:38.99	

Final

Rank	Name	Nationality	Time	Notes
1st place, gold medalist(s)	Arjola Trimi	Italy	41.15	WR
2nd place, silver medalist(s)	Marta Fernandez Infante	Spain	42.70	
3rd place, bronze medalist(s)	Nataliia Butkova	Russia	44.87	
4	Alexandra Stamatopoulou	Greece	46.38	
5	Gina Böttcher	Germany	46.70	
6	Olga Sviderska	Ukraine	48.28	
7	Zulfiya Gabidullina	Kazakhstan	49.01	
8	Yuliia Safonova	Ukraine	55.98	

=== S5 ===
Final

Rank	Name	Nationality	Time	Notes
1st place, gold medalist(s)	Teresa Perales	Spain	38.78	
2nd place, silver medalist(s)	Monica Boggioni	Italy	40.60	
3rd place, bronze medalist(s)	Sevilay Ozturk	Turkey	43.82	
4	Sumeyye Boyaci	Turkey	44.10	

=== S6 ===
Final

Rank	Name	Nationality	Time	Notes
1st place, gold medalist(s)	Yelyzaveta Mereshko	Ukraine	32.93	
2nd place, silver medalist(s)	Viktoriia Savtsova	Ukraine	34.15	
3rd place, bronze medalist(s)	Nicole Turner	Ireland	35.56	
4	Eleanor Robinson	Great Britain	35.80	
5	Anastasia Diodorova	Russia	41.51	
6	Gabriele Cepaviciute	Lithuania	44.17	
7	Agata Koupilova	Czech Republic	47.28	
8	Maja Theuma	Malta	1:11.55	

=== S7 ===
Heats

Rank	Heat	Name	Nationality	Time	Notes
1	2	Giulia Terzi	Italy	33.89	Q
2	1	Anna Hontar	Ukraine	34.06	Q
2	2	Denise Grahl	Germany	34.06	Q
4	1	Sabine Weber-Treiber	Austria	35.54	Q
5	2	Agnes Kramer	Sweden	36.95	Q
6	1	Iryna Anisimova	Ukraine	37.59	Q
7	2	Nicola St Clair Maitland	Sweden	38.43	Q
8	2	Ida Andersson Wulf	Sweden	39.24	Q
9	1	Meri-Maari Makinen	Finland	39.81	
10	1	Nil Sahin	Turkey	39.88	
11	2	Katherina Roesler	Germany	43.70	

Final

Rank	Name	Nationality	Time	Notes
1st place, gold medalist(s)	Giulia Terzi	Italy	33.44	
2nd place, silver medalist(s)	Denise Grahl	Germany	33.57	
3rd place, bronze medalist(s)	Anna Hontar	Ukraine	33.62	
4	Sabine Weber-Treiber	Austria	35.57	
5	Agnes Kramer	Sweden	36.80	
6	Nicola St Clair Maitland	Sweden	37.91	
7	Iryna Anisimova	Ukraine	38.82	
8	Ida Andersson Wulf	Sweden	40.17	

=== S8 ===
Final

Rank	Name	Nationality	Time	Notes
1st place, gold medalist(s)	Viktoriia Ishchiulova	Russia	30.69	
2nd place, silver medalist(s)	Xenia Francesca Palazzo	Italy	31.16	
3rd place, bronze medalist(s)	Mariia Pavlova	Russia	31.77	
4	Kateryna Denysenko	Ukraine	32.21	
5	Nahia Zudaire Borrezo	Spain	33.21	
6	Mira Jeanne Maack	Germany	34.53	
7	Amalie Vinther	Denmark	34.83	

=== S9 ===
Heats

Rank	Heat	Name	Nationality	Time	Notes
1	1	Sarai Gascon	Spain	29.99	Q
2	2	Susana Veiga	Portugal	30.58	Q
3	1	Nuria Marqués Soto	Spain	31.05	Q
4	2	Claire Supiot	France	31.07	Q
5	2	Zsofia Konkoly	Hungary	31.20	Q
6	2	Lina Watz	Sweden	31.35	Q
7	2	Vittoria Bianco	Italy	31.77	Q
8	1	Stephanie Millward	Great Britain	31.78	Q
9	1	Efthymia Gkouli	Greece	32.58	
10	2	Zuzanna Boruszewska	Poland	33.45	
11	1	Renata Pinto	Portugal	33.59	

Final

Rank	Name	Nationality	Time	Notes
1st place, gold medalist(s)	Susana Veiga	Portugal	28.85	ER
2nd place, silver medalist(s)	Sarai Gascon	Spain	29.30	
3rd place, bronze medalist(s)	Nuria Marqués Soto	Spain	30.71	
4	Zsofia Konkoly	Hungary	30.97	
5	Claire Supiot	France	31.10	
6	Lina Watz	Sweden	31.21	
7	Vittoria Bianco	Italy	31.56	
8	Stephanie Millward	Great Britain	31.75	

=== S10 ===
Heat 1

Rank	Name	Nationality	Time	Notes
1	Alessia Scortechini	Italy	29.35	Q
2	Susannah Kaul	Estonia	29.48	Q
3	Isabel Yinghua Hernandez Santos	Spain	29.83	Q
4	Emeline Pierre	France	29.99	Q
5	Cosima Carmen Cheyenne Reinicke	Germany	30.16	Q
6	Jenna Rajahalme	Finland	30.17	Q
7	Julia Benito de Tena	Spain	30.66	Q
8	Francisca Castro	Spain	30.83	Q
9	Aleksandra Ochtera	Poland	31.63	

Final

Rank	Name	Nationality	Time	Notes
1st place, gold medalist(s)	Alessia Scortechini	Italy	28.71	
2nd place, silver medalist(s)	Susannah Kaul	Estonia	29.31	
3rd place, bronze medalist(s)	Emeline Pierre	France	29.73	
4	Isabel Yinghua Hernandez Santos	Spain	29.95	
5	Cosima Carmen Cheyenne Reinicke	Germany	30.15	
6	Jenna Rajahalme	Finland	30.26	
7	Julia Benito de Tena	Spain	30.58	
8	Francisca Castro	Spain	31.11	

=== S11 ===
Final

Rank	Name	Nationality	Time	Notes
1st place, gold medalist(s)	Maryna Piddubna	Ukraine	31.80	
2nd place, silver medalist(s)	Sofiia Polikarpova	Russia	32.82	
3rd place, bronze medalist(s)	Kateryna Tkachuk	Ukraine	33.01	
4	Tatiana Blattnerova	Slovakia	34.06	
5	Yana Berezhna	Ukraine	36.16	
6	Tatia Kalandadze	Georgia	45.03	

=== S12 ===
Final

Rank	Name	Nationality	Time	Notes
1st place, gold medalist(s)	Daria Pikalova	Russia	27.46	
2nd place, silver medalist(s)	Mariia Latritskaia	Russia	28.15	
3rd place, bronze medalist(s)	Alessia Berra	Italy	28.49	
4	Maria Delgado Nadal	Spain	28.71	
5	Belkys Mota	Venezuela	30.23	
6	Neele Labudda	Germany	31.77	
7	Aliya Rakhimbekova	Kazakhstan	31.87	
8	Katarina Chuda	Slovakia	32.01	

=== S13 ===
Heat 1

Rank	Name	Nationality	Time	Notes
1	Carlotta Gilli	Italy	27.62	Q
2	Anna Krivshina	Russia	27.84	Q
3	Anna Stetsenko	Ukraine	28.49	Q
4	Roisin Ni Riain	Ireland	28.96	Q
5	Marian Polo Lopez	Spain	29.04	Q
6	Elena Krawzow	Germany	29.26	Q
7	Joanna Mendak	Poland	29.50	Q
8	Evangelia Chrysoula Chioti	Greece	29.59	Q
9	Marlene Endrolath	Germany	30.17	
10	Abby Kane	Great Britain	31.04	

Final

Rank	Name	Nationality	Time	Notes
1st place, gold medalist(s)	Anna Krivshina	Russia	27.26	
2nd place, silver medalist(s)	Carlotta Gilli	Italy	27.30	
3rd place, bronze medalist(s)	Anna Stetsenko	Ukraine	27.82	
4	Elena Krawzow	Germany	28.44	
5	Marian Polo Lopez	Spain	28.76	
6	Roisin Ni Riain	Ireland	28.93	
7	Evangelia Chrysoula Chioti	Greece	29.40	
8	Joanna Mendak	Poland	29.47	
