= 2018 World Para Swimming European Championships – Women's 50 metres freestyle =

The women's 50 metres freestyle at the 2018 World Para Swimming European Championships was held at the National Aquatic Centre in Dublin from 13–19 August. 9 classification finals are held in all over this event.

== Medalists ==
Event	Gold		Silver		Bronze	
S5	Teresa Perales (ESP)	38.55	Monica Boggioni (ITA)	39.49	Tully Kearney (GBR)	39.77
S6	Yelyzaveta Mereshko (UKR)	32.78 WR	Viktoriia Savtsoka (UKR)	32.79	Eleanor Robinson (GBR)	34.31
S7	Denise Grahl (GER)	32.83 ER	Sabine Weber-Treiber (AUT)	35.20	Anna Hontar (UKR)	35.23
S8	Claire Supiot (FRA)	31.22	Xenia Francesca Palazzo (ITA)	31.34	Kateryna Denysenko (UKR)	35.47
S9	Sarai Gascon (ESP)	29.01	Susana Veiga (POR)	29.78	Nuria Marqués (ESP)	30.39
S10	Chantalle Zijderveld (NED)	28.05	Zara Mullooly (GBR)	28.30	Alessia Scortechini (ITA)	28.48
S11	Maryna Piddubna (UKR)	30.22 WR	Liesette Bruinsma (NED)	30.54	Maja Reichard (SWE)	31.17
S12	Hannah Russell (GBR); Elena Krawzow (GER)	27.94	no medal award		Alessia Berra (ITA)	28.67
S13	Carlotta Gilli (ITA)	26.90	Anna Stetsenko (UKR)	27.83	Marian Polo Lopez (ESP)	28.63
WR world record | AR area record | CR championship record | GR games record | NR national record | OR Olympic record | PB personal best | SB season best | WL world leading (in a given season)

== Results ==
=== S5 ===
Final

Rank	Name	Nationality	Time	Notes
1st place, gold medalist(s)	Teresa Perales	Spain	38.55	
2nd place, silver medalist(s)	Monica Boggioni	Italy	39.49	
3rd place, bronze medalist(s)	Tully Kearney	Great Britain	39.77	
4	Peggy Sonntag	Germany	43.96	
5	Sevilay Ozturk	Turkey	46.82	
6	Sumeyye Boyaci	Turkey	47.52	
7	Ozge Ustun	Turkey	1:26.11	

=== S6 ===
Heats

11 swimmers from 7 nations took part.

Rank	Heat	Name	Nationality	Time	Notes
1	2	Viktoriia Savtsova	Ukraine	33.32	Q
2	1	Yelyzaveta Mereshko	Ukraine	33.53	Q
3	2	Eleanor Robinson	Great Britain	34.22	Q
4	1	Maisie Summers-Newton	Great Britain	35.04	Q
5	2	Nicole Turner	Ireland	36.07	Q
6	1	Verena Schott	Germany	38.71	Q
7	1	Chiara Cordini	Italy	38.81	Q
8	2	Tully Kearney	Great Britain	38.83	Q
9	2	Thelma Bjorg Bjornsdottir	Iceland	39.65	
10	1	Jasmin Beutler	Germany	40.49	
11	2	Agata Koupilova	Czech Republic	40.89	

Final

Yelyzaveta Mereshko broke the world record in the women's 50m freestyle S6.

Rank	Name	Nationality	Time	Notes
1st place, gold medalist(s)	Yelyzaveta Mereshko	Ukraine	32.78	WR
2nd place, silver medalist(s)	Viktoriia Savtsova	Ukraine	32.79	
3rd place, bronze medalist(s)	Eleanor Robinson	Great Britain	34.31	
4	Maisie Summers-Newton	Great Britain	34.70	
5	Verena Schott	Germany	36.50	
6	Nicole Turner	Ireland	36.52	
7	Tully Kearney	Great Britain	37.50	
8	Chiara Cordini	Italy	39.62	

=== S7 ===
Heats

Eleven swimmers for 9 nations took part.

Rank	Heat	Name	Nationality	Time	Notes
1	2	Denise Grahl	Germany	33.29	Q
2	1	Anna Hontar	Ukraine	35.50	Q
3	1	Sabine Weber-Treiber	Austria	35.80	Q
4	2	Agnes Kramer	Sweden	36.34	Q
5	2	Erel Halevi	Israel	37.29	Q
6	1	Nicola St Clair Maitland	Sweden	37.99	Q
7	2	Judit Rolo Marichal	Spain	38.67	Q
8	1	Meri-Maari Makinen	Finland	39.16	Q
9	2	Ida Andersson Wulf	Sweden	39.76	
10	1	Nil Sahin	Turkey	40.75	
11	2	Katherina Roesler	Germany	42.46	
12	1	Louise Bast Aaby	Denmark	48.62	

Final

Denise Grahl broke the European record in the final round.

Rank	Name	Nationality	Time	Notes
1st place, gold medalist(s)	Denise Grahl	Germany	32.83	ER
2nd place, silver medalist(s)	Sabine Weber-Treiber	Austria	35.20	
3rd place, bronze medalist(s)	Anna Hontar	Ukraine	35.23	
4	Agnes Kramer	Sweden	35.30	
5	Nicola St Clair Maitland	Sweden	36.63	
6	Erel Halevi	Israel	37.69	
7	Judi Rolo Marichal	Spain	37.71	
8	Meri-Maari Makinen	Finland	39.93	

=== S8 ===
Heats

12 swimmers from 11 nations took part.

Rank	Heat	Name	Nationality	Time	Notes
1	2	Claire Supiot	France	31.47	Q
2	1	Xenia Francesca Palazzo	Italy	32.51	Q
3	2	Kateryna Denysenko	Ukraine	32.75	Q
4	1	Megan Richter	Great Britain	33.51	Q
5	2	Amalie Vinther	Denmark	33.87	Q
6	1	Nahia Zudaire Borrezo	Spain	35.76	Q
7	1	Monika Belczewska	Poland	36.52	Q
8	1	Nikola Kacik	Poland	38.39	Q
9	2	Celine Deleuze	Belgium	39.47	
10	2	Martina Crkvenac	Croatia	39.86	
11	1	Keit Jaanimagi	Estonia	40.19	
12	2	Petra Flekacova	Czech Republic	41.16	

Final

Rank	Name	Nationality	Time	Notes
1st place, gold medalist(s)	Claire Supiot	France	31.22	
2nd place, silver medalist(s)	Xenia Francesca Palazzo	Italy	31.34	
3rd place, bronze medalist(s)	Kateryna Denysenko	Ukraine	32.47	
4	Megan Richter	Great Britain	33.18	
5	Nahia Zudaire Borrezo	Spain	33.59	
6	Amalie Vinther	Denmark	34.12	
7	Monika Belczewska	Poland	37.14	
8	Nikola Kacik	Poland	38.72	

=== S9 ===
Final

Rank	Name	Nationality	Time	Notes
1st place, gold medalist(s)	Sarai Gascon	Spain	29.01	
2nd place, silver medalist(s)	Susana Veiga	Portugal	29.78	
3rd place, bronze medalist(s)	Nuria Marqués Soto	Spain	30.39	
4	Lina Watz	Sweden	30.86	
5	Toni Shaw	Great Britain	31.00	
6	Efthymia Gkouli	Greece	31.51	

=== S10 ===
Heats

12 swimmers from 8 nations took part.

Rank	Heat	Name	Nationality	Time	Notes
1	2	Chantalle Zijderveld	Netherlands	28.35	Q
2	2	Alessia Scortechini	Italy	29.06	Q
3	1	Elodie Lorandi	France	29.18	Q
4	1	Isabel Yinghua Hernandez Santos	Spain	29.34	Q
5	1	Lisa Kruger	Netherlands	29.55	Q
6	2	Zara Mullooly	Great Britain	29.87	Q
7	1	Susannah Kaul	Estonia	30.01	Q
8	2	Emeline Pierre	France	30.26	Q
9	2	Aliaksandra Svadkouskaya	Belarus	30.43	
10	2	Florianne Bultje	Netherlands	30.74	
11	1	Jenna Rajahalme	Finland	30.86	
12	1	Julia Benito de Tena	Spain	31.34	

Final

Rank	Name	Nationality	Time	Notes
1st place, gold medalist(s)	Chantalle Zijderveld	Netherlands	28.05	
2nd place, silver medalist(s)	Zara Mullooly	Great Britain	28.30	
3rd place, bronze medalist(s)	Alessia Scortechini	Italy	28.48	
4	Elodie Lorandi	France	28.98	
5	Isabel Yinghua Hernandez Santos	Spain	29.18	
6	Lisa Kruger	Netherlands	29.33	
7	Susannah Kaul	Estonia	29.96	
8	Emeline Pierre	France	30.00	

=== S11 ===
Final

Maryna Piddubna broke the world record in the women's 50m freestyle S11.

Rank	Name	Nationality	Time	Notes
1st place, gold medalist(s)	Maryna Piddubna	Ukraine	30.22	WR
2nd place, silver medalist(s)	Liesette Bruinsma	Netherlands	30.54	
3rd place, bronze medalist(s)	Maja Reichard	Sweden	31.17	
4	Cecilia Camellini	Italy	31.92	
5	Kateryna Tkachuk	Ukraine	33.61	
6	Martina Rabbolini	Italy	34.05	
7	Tatiana Blattnerova	Slovakia	35.10	
8	Olga Iakibiuk	Ukraine	39.28	

=== S12 ===
Final

There was a tie for the gold medal for Hannah Russell and Elena Krawzow in the women's 50m freestyle S12 final.

Rank	Name	Nationality	Time	Notes
1st place, gold medalist(s)	Hannah Russell	Great Britain	27.94	
1st place, gold medalist(s)	Elena Krawzow	Germany	27.94	
3rd place, bronze medalist(s)	Alessia Berra	Italy	28.67	
4	Maria Delgado Nadal	Spain	29.22	
5	Karolina Pelendritou	Cyprus	29.51	
6	Neele Labudda	Germany	31.55	
7	Katarina Chuda	Slovakia	33.91	
8	Fatma Nur Baki	Turkey	37.71	

== See also ==
- List of IPC world records in swimming
