= 2020 World Para Swimming European Open Championships – Women's 100 metre backstroke =

The women's 100m backstroke events at the 2020 World Para Swimming European Open Championships were held at the Penteada Olympic Pools Complex.

== Medalists ==
Event	Gold	Silver	Bronze
S6	Nora Meister; Switzerland	Verena Schott; Germany	Yelyzaveta Mereshko; Ukraine
S7	Anna Hontar; Ukraine	Agnes Kramer; Sweden	Milana Shchelokova; Russia
S8	Viktoriia Ishchiulova; Russia	Kateryna Denysenko; Ukraine	Xenia Francesca Palazzo; Italy
S9	Nuria Marques Soto; Spain	Lina Watz; Sweden	Stephanie Millward; Great Britain
S10	Bianka Pap; Hungary	Anaelle Roulet; France	Emeline Pierre; France
S11	Sofiia Polikarpova; Russia	Maryna Piddubna; Ukraine	Kateryna Tkachuk; Ukraine
S12	Daria Pikalova; Russia	Maria Delgado Nadal; Spain	Alessia Berra; Italy
S13	Carlotta Gilli; Italy	Anna Krivshina; Russia	Roisin Ni Riain; Ireland
S14	Jessica-Jane Applegate; Great Britain	Janina Breuer; Germany	Olga Poteshkina; Russia

== Results ==
=== S6 ===
Final

Rank	Name	Nationality	Time	Notes
1st place, gold medalist(s)	Nora Meister	Switzerland	1:21.78	ER
2nd place, silver medalist(s)	Verena Schott	Germany	1:22.75	
3rd place, bronze medalist(s)	Yelyzaveta Mereshko	Ukraine	1:24.04	
4	Anastasia Diodorova	Russia	1:26.43	
5	Anastasiia Zavalii	Ukraine	1:30.34	
6	Gabriele Cepaviciute	Lithuania	1:32.35	
7	Arianna Talamona	Italy	1:33.78	
8	Maria Tsakona	Greece	1:43.58	

=== S8 ===
Final

Rank	Name	Nationality	Time	Notes
1st place, gold medalist(s)	Viktoriia Ishchiulova	Russia	1:13.59	
2nd place, silver medalist(s)	Kateryna Denysenko	Ukraine	1:19.33	
3rd place, bronze medalist(s)	Xenia Francesca Palazzo	Italy	1:20.73	
4	Mira Jeanne Maack	Germany	1:22.77	
5	Mariia Pavlova	Russia	1:24.99	
6	Jade Le Bris	France	1:26.04	

=== S12 ===
Final

Rank	Name	Nationality	Time	Notes
1st place, gold medalist(s)	Daria Pikalova	Russia	1:07.85	
2nd place, silver medalist(s)	Maria Delgado Nadal	Spain	1:10.32	
3rd place, bronze medalist(s)	Alessia Berra	Italy	1:15.53	
4	Yaryna Matlo	Ukraine	1:18.85	
5	Neele Labudda	Germany	1:22.16	
6	Katarina Chuda	Slovakia	1:23.98	
7	Aliya Rakhimbekova	Kazakhstan	1:29.60	

=== S14 ===
Heat 1

Rank	Name	Nationality	Time	Notes
1	Jessica-Jane Applegate	Great Britain	1:10.88	Q
2	Elizaveta Barbatina	Russia	1:11.69	Q
3	Janina Breuer	Germany	1:13.18	Q
4	Olga Poteshkina	Russia	1:16.14	Q
5	Eva Coronado Tejeda	Spain	1:16.43	Q
6	Pernilla Lindberg	Sweden	1:17.14	Q
7	Janina Falk	Austria	1:20.72	Q
8	Maely Chevallier	France	1:23.86	Q
—	Giorgia Marchi	Italy	DQ	

Final

Rank	Name	Nationality	Time	Notes
1st place, gold medalist(s)	Jessica-Jane Applegate	Great Britain	1:09.37	
2nd place, silver medalist(s)	Janina Breuer	Germany	1:12.00	
3rd place, bronze medalist(s)	Olga Poteshkina	Russia	1:15.12	
4	Eva Coronado Tejeda	Spain	1:15.45	
5	Pernilla Lindberg	Sweden	1:15.46	
6	Janina Falk	Austria	1:17.13	
7	Maely Chevallier	France	1:22.21	
—	Elizaveta Barbatina	Russia	DNS	
