= Swimming at the 2020 Summer Paralympics – Women's 50 metre freestyle =

The Women's 50 metre freestyle swimming events for the 2020 Summer Paralympics took place at the Tokyo Aquatics Centre from 25 August to 2 September 2021. A total of six events were contested over this distance.

== Schedule ==
H	Heats	½	Semifinals	F	Final

Date	Wed 25		Thu 26		Fri 27		Sat 28		Sun 29		Mon 30		Tue 31		Wed 1		Thu 2	
Event	M	E	M	E	M	E	M	E	M	E	M	E	M	E	M	E	M	E
S4 50m																	H	F
S6 50m	H	F																
S8 50m															H	F		
S10 50m	H	F																
S11 50m									H	F								
S13 50m									H	F								

== Medal summary ==
The following is a summary of the medals awarded across all 50 metre freestyle events
Due to opposition by a participating nation, S11 was postponed and took place on 29 August 2021.

Classification	Gold		Silver		Bronze	
S4	Rachael Watson; Australia	39.36 PR	Arjola Trimi; Italy	40.32 WR	Marta Fernández Infante; Spain	40.85
S6	Yelyzaveta Mereshko; Ukraine	33.11 PR	Elizabeth Marks; United States	33.15	Anna Hontar; Ukraine	33.40
S8	Viktoriia Ishchiulova; RPC	29.91	Cecília Jerônimo de Araújo; Brazil	30.83	Xenia Palazzo; Italy	31.17
S10	Anastasiia Gontar; RPC	27.38	Chantalle Zijderveld; Netherlands	27.42	Aurélie Rivard; Canada	28.11
S11	Ma Jia; China	29.20 WR	Li Guizhi; China	29.72	Karolina Pelendritou; Cyprus	29.79
S13	Maria Carolina Santiago; Brazil	26.82	Anna Krivshina; RPC	27.06	Carlotta Gilli; Italy	27.07

== Results ==
The following were the results of the finals only of each of the Women's 50 metre freestyle events in each of the classifications. Further details of each event, including where appropriate heats and semi finals results, are available on that event's dedicated page.

=== S4 ===
The S4 category is for swimmers who have function in their hands and arms but can't use their trunk or legs to swim, or they have three amputated limbs.

The final in this classification took place on 2 September 2021:

Rank	Lane	Name	Nationality	Time	Notes
1st place, gold medalist(s)	2	Rachael Watson	Australia	39.36	PR
2nd place, silver medalist(s)	3	Arjola Trimi	Italy	40.32	WR
3rd place, bronze medalist(s)	4	Marta Fernández Infante	Spain	40.85	
4	5	Patrícia Pereira	Brazil	41.56	
5	6	Nely Miranda	Mexico	42.31	
6	7	Zhou Yanfei	China	43.16	
7	1	Nataliia Butkova	RPC	43.75	
8	8	Zulfiya Gabidullina	Kazakhstan	48.12	

=== S6 ===
The S6 category is for swimmers who have short stature, arm amputations, or some form of coordination problem on one side of their body.

The final in this classification took place on 25 August 2021:

Rank	Lane	Name	Nationality	Time	Notes
1st place, gold medalist(s)	5	Yelyzaveta Mereshko	Ukraine	33.11	PR
2nd place, silver medalist(s)	4	Elizabeth Marks	United States	33.15	
3rd place, bronze medalist(s)	3	Anna Hontar	Ukraine	33.40	
4	2	Jiang Yuyan	China	33.55	
5	1	Viktoriia Savtsova	Ukraine	33.68	
6	6	Sara Vargas Blanco	Colombia	33.97	
7	7	Song Lingling	China	34.40	
8	8	Nicole Turner	Ireland	35.29	

=== S8 ===
The S8 category is for swimmers who have a single amputation, or restrictive movement in their hip, knee and ankle joints.

The final in this classification took place on 1 September 2021:

Rank	Lane	Name	Nationality	Time	Notes
1st place, gold medalist(s)	4	Viktoriia Ishchiulova	RPC	29.91	
2nd place, silver medalist(s)	5	Cecília Jerônimo de Araújo	Brazil	30.83	
3rd place, bronze medalist(s)	3	Xenia Francesca Palazzo	Italy	31.17	
4	7	Kateryna Denysenko	Ukraine	31.47	
5	6	Tupou Neiufi	New Zealand	31.48	
6	8	Morgan Bird	Canada	32.16	
7	2	Mallory Weggemann	United States	32.66	
8	1	McKenzie Coan	United States	33.18	

=== S10 ===
The S10 category is for swimmers who have minor physical impairments, for example, loss of one hand.

The final in this classification took place on 25 August 2021:

Rank	Lane	Name	Nationality	Time	Notes
1st place, gold medalist(s)	4	Anastasiia Gontar	RPC	27.38	
2nd place, silver medalist(s)	3	Chantalle Zijderveld	Netherlands	27.42	
3rd place, bronze medalist(s)	5	Aurélie Rivard	Canada	28.11	
4	2	Alessia Scortechini	Italy	28.26	
5	6	Mariana Ribeiro	Brazil	28.58	
6	7	María Barrera Zapata	Colombia	28.70	
7	1	Zara Mullooly	Great Britain	28.73	
8	8	Zhang Meng	China	28.96	

=== S11 ===
The S11 category is for swimmers who have severe visual impairments and have very low or no light perception, such as blindness; they are required to wear blackened goggles to compete. They use tappers when competing in swimming events.

The final in this classification took place on 29 August 2021:

Rank	Lane	Name	Nationality	Time	Notes
1st place, gold medalist(s)	3	Ma Jia	China	29.20	WR
2nd place, silver medalist(s)	5	Li Guizhi	China	29.72	
3rd place, bronze medalist(s)	4	Karolina Pelendritou	Cyprus	29.79	
4	6	Liesette Bruinsma	Netherlands	30.19	
5	7	Wang Xinyi	China	30.24	
6	1	Maryna Piddubna	Ukraine	30.65	
7	2	Tomomi Ishiura	Japan	30.85	
8	8	Anastasia Pagonis	United States	30.91	

=== S13 ===
The S13 category is for swimmers who have minor visual impairment and have high visual acuity. They are required to wear blackened goggles to compete. They may wish to use a tapper.

The final in this classification took place on 29 August 2021:

Rank	Lane	Name	Nationality	Time	Notes
1st place, gold medalist(s)	4	Maria Carolina Gomes Santiago	Brazil	26.82	PR
2nd place, silver medalist(s)	5	Anna Krivshina	RPC	27.06	PR
3rd place, bronze medalist(s)	3	Carlotta Gilli	Italy	27.07	
4	6	Katja Dedekind	Australia	27.14	OC
5	2	Daria Pikalova	RPC	27.39	
6	1	Hannah Russell	Great Britain	27.58	
7	7	Ayano Tsujiuchi	Japan	27.59	
8	8	Anna Stetsenko	Ukraine	27.68	
