= 2019 World Para Swimming Championships – Women's 50 metre freestyle =

The women's 50m freestyle events at the 2019 World Para Swimming Championships were held in the London Aquatics Centre at the Queen Elizabeth Olympic Park in London between 9–15 September.

== Medalists ==
Event	Gold	Silver	Bronze
S4	Arjola Trimi; Italy	Rachael Watson; Australia	Peng Qiuping; China
S5	Tully Kearney; Great Britain	Suzanna Hext; Great Britain	Joana Maria Silva; Brazil
S6	Yelyzaveta Mereshko; Ukraine	Viktoriia Savtsova; Ukraine	Jiang Yuyan; China
S7	Mallory Weggemann; United States	McKenzie Coan; United States	Denise Grahl; Germany
S8	Alice Tai; Great Britain	Cecilia Jeronimo de Araujo; Brazil	Claire Supiot; France
S9	Sophie Pascoe; New Zealand	Susana Veiga; Portugal	Sarai Gascon; Spain
S10	Aurelie Rivard; Canada	Zara Mullooly; Great Britain	Chantalle Zijderveld; Netherlands
S11	Maryna Piddubna; Ukraine	Liesette Bruinsma; Netherlands	Li Guizhi; China
S12	Maria Carolina Gomes Santiago; Brazil	Anna Krivshina; Russia	Mariia Latritskaia; Russia
S13	Carlotta Gilli; Italy	Daria Pikalova; Russia	Anna Stetsenko; Ukraine
