= 2018 World Para Swimming European Championships – Women's 100 metres backstroke =

The women's 100 metres backstroke at the 2018 World Para Swimming European Championships was held at the National Aquatic Centre in Dublin from 13 to 19 August. 9 classification finals are held in all over this event.

== Medalists ==
Event	Gold		Silver		Bronze	
S6	Verena Schott (GER)	1:25.06 ER	Yelyzaveta Mereshko (UKR)	1:25.30	Grace Harvey (GBR)	1:30.17
S7	Nora Meister (SUI)	1:23.50	Anna Hontar (UKR)	1:28.97	Nicola St Clair Maitland (SWE)	1:29.89
S8	Alice Tai (GBR)	1:08.86	Megan Richter (GBR)	1:17.90	Kateryna Denysenko (UKR)	1:19.30
S9	Nuria Marqués Soto (ESP)	1:09.79	Lina Watz (SWE)	1:14.27	Toni Shaw (GBR)	1:15.38
S10	Bianka Pap (HUN)	1:08.83	Lisa Kruger (NED)	1:09.88	Anaëlle Roulet (FRA)	1:10.97
S11	Kateryna Tkachuk (UKR)	1:20.93	Cecilia Camellini (ITA)	1:21.35	Maryna Piddubna (UKR)	1:21.53
S12	Hannah Russell (GBR)	1:08.16	Maria Delgado (ESP)	1:13.04	Alessia Berra (ITA)	1:15.83
S13	Carlotta Gilli (ITA)	1:05.76 WR	Anna Stetsenko (UKR)	1:09.54	Marian Polo Lopez (ESP)	1:11.21
S14	Bethany Firth (GBR)	1:04.23	Jessica-Jane Applegate (GBR)	1:07.38	Eva Coronado Tejeda (ESP)	1:13.43
WR world record | AR area record | CR championship record | GR games record | NR national record | OR Olympic record | PB personal best | SB season best | WL world leading (in a given season)

== See also ==
- List of IPC world records in swimming
