= 2018 World Para Swimming European Championships – Women's 400 metres freestyle =

The women's 400 metres freestyle at the 2018 World Para Swimming European Championships was held at the National Aquatic Centre in Dublin from 13 to 19 August. 7 classification finals are held in all over this event.

== Medalists ==
Event	Gold		Silver		Bronze	
S6	Yelyzaveta Mereshko (UKR)	5:19.64	Eleanor Simmonds (GBR)	5:26.20	Maisie Summers-Newton (GBR)	5:26.97
S7	Nora Meister (SUI)	5:21.20	Denise Grahl (GER)	5:41.33	Erel Halevi (ISR)	5:56.28
S8	Xenia Francesca Palazzo (ITA)	4:59.51	Claire Supiot (FRA)	5:04.81	Amalie Vinther (DEN)	5:10.02
S9	Toni Shaw (GBR)	4:42.43	Nuria Marqués Soto (ESP)	4:46.65	Zsofia Konkoly (HUN)	5:02.07
S10	Oliwia Jablonska (POL)	4:34.37	Bianka Pap (HUN)	4:39.65	Elodie Lorandi (FRA)	4:40.02
S11	Liesette Bruinsma (NED)	5:04.74 WR	Cecilia Camellini (ITA)	5:20.53	Martina Rabbolini (ITA)	5:49.94
S12	Naomi Maike Schnittger (GER)	4:45.83	Maria Delgado (ESP)	4:48.70	Alessia Berra (ITA)	4:53.13
WR world record | AR area record | CR championship record | GR games record | NR national record | OR Olympic record | PB personal best | SB season best | WL world leading (in a given season)

== See also ==
- List of IPC world records in swimming
