= 2020 World Para Swimming European Open Championships – Women's 200 metre individual medley =

The women's 200m individual medley events at the 2020 World Para Swimming European Open Championships were held at the Penteada Olympic Pools Complex.

== Medalists ==
Event	Gold	Silver	Bronze
SM6	Yelyzaveta Mereshko; Ukraine	Verena Schott; Germany	Nicole Turner; Ireland
SM7	Giulia Terzi; Italy	Anna Hontar; Ukraine	Milana Shchelokova; Russia
SM8	Viktoriia Ishchiulova; Russia	Xenia Palazzo; Italy	Mariia Pavlova; Russia
SM9	Zsofia Konkoly; Hungary	Nuria Marques Soto; Spain	Sarai Gascon; Spain
SM10	Bianka Pap; Hungary	Oliwia Jablonska; Poland	Alessia Scortechini; Italy
SM13	Carlotta Gilli; Italy	Daria Pikalova; Russia	Anna Stetsenko; Ukraine
SM14	Pernilla Lindberg; Sweden	Janina Breuer; Germany	Janina Falk; Austria

== Results ==
=== SM7 ===
Heat 1

Rank	Name	Nationality	Time	Notes
1	Giulia Terzi	Italy	3:13.30	Q
2	Anna Hontar	Ukraine	3:19.28	Q
3	Milana Shchelokova	Russia	3:24.73	Q
4	Judit Rolo Marichal	Spain	3:39.31	Q
5	Aitana Estrada Chavez	Spain	3:41.79	Q
6	Katherina Roesler	Germany	3:44.87	Q
7	Meri-Maari Makinen	Finland	3:46.55	Q
8	Ida Andersson Wulf	Sweden	3:47.49	Q
9	Nil Sahin	Turkey	4:01.19	
—	Evelin Szaraz	Hungary	DNS	

Final

Rank	Name	Nationality	Time	Notes
1st place, gold medalist(s)	Giulia Terzi	Italy	3:08.12	ER
2nd place, silver medalist(s)	Anna Hontar	Ukraine	3:13.00	
3rd place, bronze medalist(s)	Milana Shchelokova	Russia	3:18.09	
4	Judit Rolo Marichal	Spain	3:37.53	
5	Aitana Estrada Chavez	Spain	3:42.06	
6	Meri-Maari Makinen	Finland	3:43.43	
7	Katherina Roesler	Germany	3:46.42	
8	Ida Andersson Wulf	Sweden	3:48.55	
