= 2018 World Para Swimming European Championships – Women's 100 metres freestyle =

The women's 100 metres freestyle at the 2018 World Para Swimming European Championships was held at the National Aquatic Centre in Dublin from 13–19 August. 9 classification finals are held in all over this event.

== Medalists ==
Event	Gold		Silver		Bronze	
S5	Tully Kearney (GBR)	1:18.79	Monica Boggioni (ITA)	1:23.32	Inbal Pezaro (ISR)	1:25.21
S6	Yelyzaveta Mereshko (UKR)	1:11.51	Eleanor Robinson (GBR)	1:13.46	Viktoriia Savtsova (UKR)	1:13.48
S7	Denise Grahl (GER)	1:11.62	Nora Meister (SUI)	1:13.83	Anna Hontar (UKR)	1:17.27
S8	Alice Tai (GBR)	1:05.53	Xenia Francesca Palazzo (ITA)	1:07.12	Claire Supiot (FRA)	1:07.33
S9	Sarai Gascon (ESP)	1:02.99	Nuria Marqués Soto (ESP)	1:03.46	Toni Shaw (GBR)	1:04.27
S10	Chantalle Zijderveld (NED)	1:01.21	Elodie Lorandi (FRA)	1:01.31	Zara Mullooly (GBR)	1:01.32
S11	Liesette Bruinsma (NED)	1:05.14 WR	Maryna Piddubna (UKR)	1:08.78	Cecilia Camellini (ITA)	1:09.84
S12	Hannah Russell (GBR)	1:01.15	Alessia Berra (ITA)	1:02.04	Elena Krawzow (GER)	1:02.10
S13	Carlotta Gilli (ITA)	57.98	Anna Stetsenko (UKR)	59.46	Ariadna Edo Beltran (ESP)	1:02.35
WR world record | AR area record | CR championship record | GR games record | NR national record | OR Olympic record | PB personal best | SB season best | WL world leading (in a given season)

== See also ==
- List of IPC world records in swimming
