= 2018 World Para Swimming European Championships – Women's 200 metres individual medley =

International swimming competitions

The women's 200 metres individual at the 2018 World Para Swimming European Championships was held at the National Aquatic Centre in Dublin from 13 to 19 August. 9 classification finals were held in all over this event.

== Medalists ==
Event	Gold		Silver		Bronze	
SM6	Maisie Summers-Newton (GBR)	2:59.60 WR	Yelyzaveta Mereshko (UKR)	3:01.69	Verena Schott (GER)	3:05.39
SM7	Anna Hontar (UKR)	3:20.30	Meri-Maari Makinen (FIN)	3:37.23	Judit Rolo Marichal (ESP)	3:37.22
SM8	Xenia Francesca Palazzo (ITA)	2:48.98	Megan Richter (GBR)	2:54.58	Claire Supiot (FRA)	2:54.79
SM9	Nuria Marques Soto (ESP)	2:35.01	Toni Shaw (GBR)	2:36.80	Ellen Keane (IRL)	2:40.64
SM10	Lisa Kruger (NED)	2:27.80 ER	Chantalle Zijderveld (NED)	2:30.02	Bianka Pap (HUN)	2:30.15
SM11	Liesette Bruinsma (NED)	2:46.58 WR	Maryna Piddubna (UKR)	2:53.76	Yana Berezhna (UKR)	3:01.04
SM12	Elena Krawzow (GER)	2:31.61	Alessia Berra (ITA)	2:36.74	Neele Labudda (GER)	2:43.79
SM13	Carlotta Gilli (ITA)	2:22.12 WR	Anna Stetsenko (UKR)	2:29.87	Ariadna Edo Beltran (ESP)	2:34.66
SM14	Bethany Firth (GBR)	2:22.82	Jessica-Jane Applegate (GBR)	2:25.01	Louise Fiddes (GBR)	2:26.49
WR world record | AR area record | CR championship record | GR games record | NR national record | OR Olympic record | PB personal best | SB season best | WL world leading (in a given season)

== See also ==
- List of IPC world records in swimming
