= Swimming at the 2020 Summer Paralympics – Women's 50 metre freestyle S8 =

Women's 50 metre freestyle S8 at the XVI Paralympic Games
- Venue: Tokyo Aquatics Centre
- Dates: 1 September 2021
- Competitors: 13 from 10 nations

Medalists
| 1st place, gold medalist(s) | | Viktoriia Ishchiulova | RPC |
| 2nd place, silver medalist(s) | | Cecília Jerônimo de Araújo | Brazil |
| 3rd place, bronze medalist(s) | | Xenia Francesca Palazzo | Italy |

The Women's 50 metre freestyle S8 event at the 2020 Paralympic Games took place on 1 September 2021, at the Tokyo Aquatics Centre.

== Heats ==
The swimmers with the top eight times, regardless of heat, advanced to the final.

| Rank | Heat | Lane | Name | Nationality | Time | Notes |
|---|---|---|---|---|---|---|
| 1 | 1 | 4 | Viktoriia Ishchiulova | RPC | 30.35 | Q |
| 2 | 2 | 4 | Cecília Jerônimo de Araújo | Brazil | 31.40 | Q |
| 3 | 2 | 5 | Xenia Francesca Palazzo | Italy | 31.57 | Q |
| 4 | 1 | 3 | Tupou Neiufi | New Zealand | 32.47 | Q |
| 5 | 1 | 6 | Mallory Weggemann | United States | 32.63 | Q |
| 6 | 1 | 5 | Kateryna Denysenko | Ukraine | 32.81 | Q |
| 7 | 2 | 2 | McKenzie Coan | United States | 33.12 | Q |
| 8 | 2 | 6 | Morgan Bird | Canada | 33.20 | Q |
| 9 | 2 | 7 | Morgan Stickney | United States | 33.50 | |
| 10 | 1 | 7 | Ani Palian | RPC | 33.82 | |
| 11 | 2 | 3 | Mariia Pavlova | RPC | 33.98 | |
| 12 | 1 | 2 | Amalie Vinther | Denmark | 35.16 | |
| 13 | 2 | 1 | Lourdes Alejandra Aybar Díaz | Dominican Republic | 36.82 | |

== Final ==
50m freestyle final
| Rank | Lane | Name | Nationality | Time | Notes |
|---|---|---|---|---|---|
| 1st place, gold medalist(s) | 4 | Viktoriia Ishchiulova | RPC | 29.91 | |
| 2nd place, silver medalist(s) | 5 | Cecília Jerônimo de Araújo | Brazil | 30.83 | |
| 3rd place, bronze medalist(s) | 3 | Xenia Francesca Palazzo | Italy | 31.17 | |
| 4 | 7 | Kateryna Denysenko | Ukraine | 31.47 | |
| 5 | 6 | Tupou Neiufi | New Zealand | 31.48 | |
| 6 | 8 | Morgan Bird | Canada | 32.16 | |
| 7 | 2 | Mallory Weggemann | United States | 32.66 | |
| 8 | 1 | McKenzie Coan | United States | 33.18 | |
