= 2019 World Para Swimming Championships – Women's 100 metre freestyle =

The women's 100m freestyle events at the 2019 World Para Swimming Championships were held in the London Aquatics Centre at the Queen Elizabeth Olympic Park in London between 9–15 September.

== Medalists ==
Event	Gold	Silver	Bronze
S3	Leanne Smith; United States	Patricia Valle; Mexico	Edenia Garcia; Brazil
S4	Arjola Trimi; Italy	Peng Qiuping; China	Rachael Watson; Australia
S5	Tully Kearney; Great Britain	Arianna Talamona; Italy	Suzanna Hext; Great Britain
S6	Jiang Yuyan; China	Yelyzaveta Mereshko; Ukraine	Maisie Summers-Newton; Great Britain
S7	McKenzie Coan; United States	Denise Grahl; Germany	Giulia Terzi; Italy
S8	Alice Tai; Great Britain	Jessica Long; United States	Claire Supiot; France
S9	Sophie Pascoe; New Zealand	Sarai Gascon; Spain	Toni Shaw; Great Britain
S10	Aurelie Rivard; Canada	Chantalle Zijderveld; Netherlands	Lisa Kruger; Netherlands
S11	Liesette Bruinsma; Netherlands	Maryna Piddubna; Ukraine	Li Guizhi; China
S12	Maria Carolina Gomes Santiago; Brazil	Anna Krivshina; Russia	Rebecca Meyers; United States
S13	Carlotta Gilli; Italy	Anna Stetsenko; Ukraine	Shokhsanamkhon Toshpulatova; Uzbekistan
