= Swimming at the 2020 Summer Paralympics – Women's 50 metre freestyle S6 =

Women's 50 metre freestyle S6 at the XVI Paralympic Games
- Venue: Tokyo Aquatics Centre
- Dates: 25 August 2021
- Competitors: 16 from 13 nations

Medalists
1st place, gold medalist(s)		Yelyzaveta Mereshko	Ukraine
2nd place, silver medalist(s)		Elizabeth Marks	United States
3rd place, bronze medalist(s)		Anna Hontar	Ukraine

The Women's 50 metre freestyle S6 event at the 2020 Paralympic Games took place on 25 August 2021, at the Tokyo Aquatics Centre.

== Heats ==
The swimmers with the top eight times, regardless of heat, advanced to the final.

Rank	Heat	Lane	Name	Nationality	Time	Notes
1	1	5	Elizabeth Marks	United States	33.16	Q, PR
2	2	4	Yelyzaveta Mereshko	Ukraine	33.51	Q
3	1	4	Anna Hontar	Ukraine	33.81	Q
4	1	6	Sara Vargas Blanco	Colombia	33.83	Q
5	2	3	Jiang Yuyan	China	34.16	Q
6	2	2	Song Lingling	China	34.96	Q
7	2	5	Viktoriia Savtsova	Ukraine	34.97	Q
8	2	7	Nicole Turner	Ireland	35.47	Q
9	2	6	Shelby Newkirk	Canada	35.50	
10	1	2	Nora Meister	Switzerland	35.68	
11	1	7	Laila Suzigan	Brazil	36.51	
12	2	1	Verena Schott	Germany	36.59	
13	1	1	Ayaallah Tewfick	Egypt	37.83	
14	1	8	Arianna Talamona	Italy	38.89	
15	2	8	Trịnh Thị Bích Như	Vietnam	39.14	
	1	3	Eleanor Robinson	Great Britain	DNS	

== Final ==
Rank	Lane	Name	Nationality	Time	Notes
1st place, gold medalist(s)	5	Yelyzaveta Mereshko	Ukraine	33.11	PR
2nd place, silver medalist(s)	4	Elizabeth Marks	United States	33.15	
3rd place, bronze medalist(s)	3	Anna Hontar	Ukraine	33.40	
4	2	Jiang Yuyan	China	33.55	
5	1	Viktoriia Savtsova	Ukraine	33.68	
6	6	Sara Vargas Blanco	Colombia	33.97	
7	7	Song Lingling	China	34.40	
8	8	Nicole Turner	Ireland	35.29	
