= 2018 World Para Swimming European Championships – Women's 100 metres breaststroke =

The women's 100 metres breaststroke at the 2018 World Para Swimming European Championships was held at the National Aquatic Centre in Dublin from 13 to 19 August. 8 classification finals were held in all over this event.

== Medalists ==
Event	Gold		Silver		Bronze	
SB5	Yelyzaveta Mereshko (UKR)	1:41.24	Sarah Louise Rung (NOR)	1:44.54	Verena Schott (GER)	1:44.66
SB6	Maisie Summers-Newton (GBR)	1:33.63	Eleanor Simmonds (GBR)	1:41.56	Viktoriia Savtsova (UKR)	1:41.93
SB7	Oksana Khrul (UKR)	1:38.93	Vendula Duskova (CZE)	1:42.57	Megan Richter (GBR)	1:42.86
SB8	Ellen Keane (IRL)	1:23.29	Nuria Marques Soto (ESP)	1:28.64	Efthymia Gkouli (GRE)	1:32.14
SB9	Chantalle Zijderveld (NED)	1:12.42 WR	Lisa Kruger (NED)	1:14.87	Aliaksandra Svadkouskaya (BLR)	1:26.63
SB11	Liesette Bruinsma (NED)	1:26.60	Yana Berezhna (UKR)	1:27.25	Maja Reichard (SWE)	1:29.27
SB12	Elena Krawzow (GER)	1:16.44	Karolina Pelendritou (CYP)	1:16.98	Anastasiya Zudzilava (BLR)	1:21.14
SB14	Louise Fiddes (GBR)	1:14.17	Michelle Alonso Morales (ESP)	1:15.55	Bethany Firth (GBR)	1:16.84
WR world record | AR area record | CR championship record | GR games record | NR national record | OR Olympic record | PB personal best | SB season best | WL world leading (in a given season)

== See also ==
- List of IPC world records in swimming
