= 2019 World Para Swimming Championships – Women's 200 metre individual medley =

The women's 200m individual medley events at the 2019 World Para Swimming Championships were held in the London Aquatics Centre at the Queen Elizabeth Olympic Park in London between 9–15 September.

== Medalists ==
Event	Gold	Silver	Bronze
SM5	Arianna Talamona; Italy	Cheng Jiao; China	Giulia Ghiretti; Italy
SM6	Maisie Summers-Newton; Great Britain	Yelyzaveta Mereshko; Ukraine	Song Lingling; China
SM7	Julia Gaffney; United States	Mallory Weggemann; United States	Tess Routliffe; Canada
SM8	Brock Whiston; Great Britain	Jessica Long; United States	Viktoriia Ishchiulova; Russia
SM9	Nuria Marqués Soto; Spain	Sarai Gascon; Spain	Toni Shaw; Great Britain
SM10	Chantalle Zijderveld; Netherlands	Lisa Kruger; Netherlands	Bianka Pap; Hungary
SM11	Liesette Bruinsma; Netherlands	Maryna Piddubna; Ukraine	Zhang Xiaotong; China
SM13	Carlotta Gilli; Italy	Rebecca Meyers; United States	Daria Lukyanenko; Russia
SM14	Valeriia Shabalina; Russia	Bethany Firth; Great Britain	Louise Fiddes; Great Britain
