= Swimming at the 2020 Summer Paralympics – Women's 50 metre freestyle S13 =

Women's 50 metre freestyle S13 at the XVI Paralympic Games
- Venue: Tokyo Aquatics Centre
- Dates: 29 August 2021
- Competitors: 21 from 13 nations

Medalists
1st place, gold medalist(s)		Maria Carolina Gomes Santiago	Brazil
2nd place, silver medalist(s)		Anna Krivshina	RPC
3rd place, bronze medalist(s)		Carlotta Gilli	Italy

The Women's 50 metre freestyle S13 event at the 2020 Paralympic Games took place on 29 August 2021, at the Tokyo Aquatics Centre.

== Heats ==
The swimmers with the top eight times, regardless of heat, advanced to the final.

Rank	Heat	Lane	Name	Nationality	Time	Notes
1	3	4	Maria Carolina Gomes Santiago	Brazil	26.87	Q, PR
2	1	4	Anna Krivshina	RPC	27.25	Q, PR
3	3	5	Carlotta Gilli	Italy	27.32	Q
4	2	4	Katja Dedekind	Australia	27.44	Q, OC
5	2	5	Daria Pikalova	RPC	27.70	Q
6	3	6	Ayano Tsujiuchi	Japan	27.79	Q
7	1	5	Hannah Russell	Great Britain	27.96	Q
8	3	3	Anna Stetsenko	Ukraine	28.06	Q
9	1	3	Gia Pergolini	United States	28.18	
10	2	7	Lucilene da Silva	Brazil	28.21	
11	2	2	Kirralee Hayes	Australia	28.29	
12	2	3	Elena Krawzow	Germany	28.61	
13	1	6	Mariia Latritskaia	RPC	28.67	
14	2	6	Shokhsanamkhon Toshpulatova	Uzbekistan	28.87	
15	2	1	Róisín Ní Ríain	Ireland	28.88	
15	3	2	Martha Ruether	United States	28.88	
17	3	1	María Delgado	Spain	28.96	
18	3	7	Joanna Mendak	Poland	29.17	
19	1	2	Nigorakhon Mirzokhidova	Uzbekistan	29.18	
20	1	7	Colleen Young	United States	29.21	
21	1	1	Rebecca Redfern	Great Britain	29.62	

== Final ==
50m freestyle final
Rank	Lane	Name	Nationality	Time	Notes
1st place, gold medalist(s)	4	Maria Carolina Gomes Santiago	Brazil	26.82	PR
2nd place, silver medalist(s)	5	Anna Krivshina	RPC	27.06	PR
3rd place, bronze medalist(s)	3	Carlotta Gilli	Italy	27.07	
4	6	Katja Dedekind	Australia	27.14	OC
5	2	Daria Pikalova	RPC	27.39	
6	1	Hannah Russell	Great Britain	27.58	
7	7	Ayano Tsujiuchi	Japan	27.59	
8	8	Anna Stetsenko	Ukraine	27.68	
