= Anna Hontar =

Ukrainian Paralympic swimmer

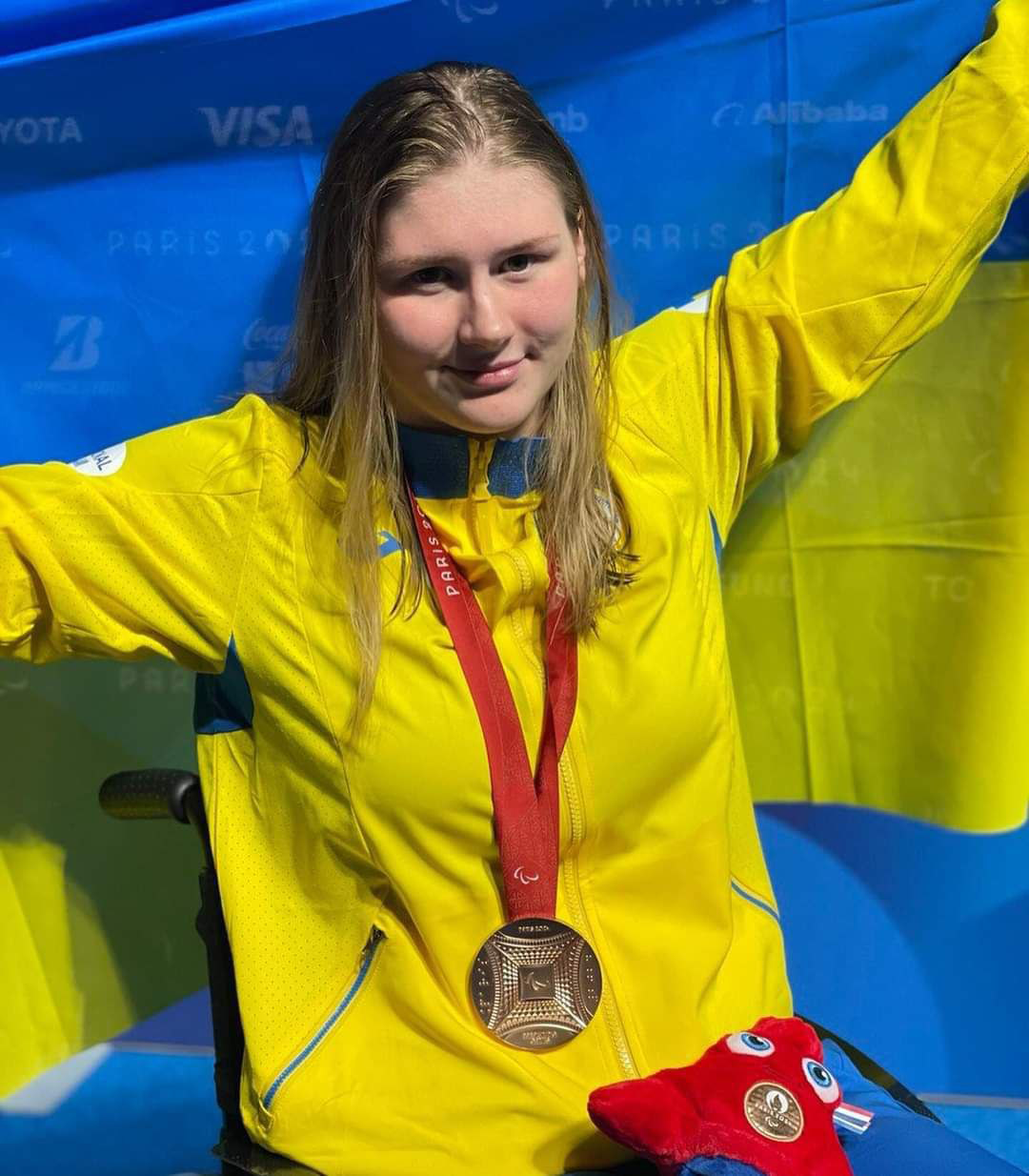
- Hontar at the 2024 Summer Paralympics

Personal information
- Born: September 9, 2003 (age 23) Kherson, Ukraine

Sport
- Sport: Swimming
Medal record
Women's para swimming
Representing Ukraine
| Event | 1st | 2nd | 3rd |
|---|---|---|---|
| Paralympic Games | 0 | 0 | 4 |
| World Championships | 4 | 6 | 5 |
| European Championships | 3 | 5 | 6 |
| Total | 7 | 11 | 15 |
Paralympic Games
| Bronze medal – third place | 2020 Tokyo | 50 m freestyle S6 |
| Bronze medal – third place | 2024 Paris | 50 m freestyle S6 |
| Bronze medal – third place | 2024 Paris | 100 m breaststroke SB5 |
| Bronze medal – third place | 2024 Paris | Mixed 4×50 m medley relay 20pts |
World Championships
| Gold medal – first place | 2022 Madeira | 50 m freestyle S6 |
| Gold medal – first place | 2023 Manchester | 50 m freestyle S6 |
| Gold medal – first place | 2025 Singapore | Mixed 4×50 m freestyle relay 20pts |
| Gold medal – first place | 2025 Singapore | 50 m freestyle S6 |
| Silver medal – second place | 2022 Madeira | 100 m backstroke S6 |
| Silver medal – second place | 2022 Madeira | 100 m freestyle S6 |
| Silver medal – second place | 2023 Manchester | 100 m freestyle S6 |
| Silver medal – second place | 2023 Manchester | Mixed 4×50 m medley relay 20pts |
| Silver medal – second place | 2025 Singapore | 100 m freestyle S6 |
| Silver medal – second place | 2025 Singapore | 100 m breaststroke SB5 |
| Bronze medal – third place | 2019 London | Mixed 4×50 m medley relay 20pts |
| Bronze medal – third place | 2023 Manchester | 100 m backstroke S6 |
| Bronze medal – third place | 2023 Manchester | Mixed 4×50 m freestyle relay 20pts |
| Bronze medal – third place | 2023 Manchester | 100 m breaststroke SB5 |
| Bronze medal – third place | 2025 Singapore | 100 m backstroke S6 |
European Championships
| Gold medal – first place | 2018 Dublin | 200 m individual medley SM7 |
| Gold medal – first place | 2020 Madeira | 100 m backstroke S7 |
| Gold medal – first place | 2026 Kocaeli | 50 m freestyle S7 |
| Silver medal – second place | 2018 Dublin | 100 m backstroke S7 |
| Silver medal – second place | 2020 Madeira | 200 m individual medley SM7 |
| Silver medal – second place | 2026 Kocaeli | Mixed 4x50 m freestyle 20pts |
| Silver medal – second place | 2026 Kocaeli | 100 m backstroke S7 |
| Silver medal – second place | 2026 Kocaeli | 100 m freestyle S7 |
| Bronze medal – third place | 2018 Dublin | 50 m freestyle S7 |
| Bronze medal – third place | 2018 Dublin | 100 m freestyle S7 |
| Bronze medal – third place | 2020 Madeira | 50 m freestyle S7 |
| Bronze medal – third place | 2020 Madeira | 100 m freestyle S7 |
| Bronze medal – third place | 2026 Kocaeli | 200 m individual medley SM7 |
| Bronze medal – third place | 2026 Kocaeli | 50 m Butterfly S7 |

Anna Vladyslavivna Hontar (born 9 September 2003 in Kherson, Ukraine) is a Ukrainian Paralympic swimmer who competes in the S6 classification. She has represented Ukraine at multiple Paralympic Games and World Para Swimming Championships, winning medals and setting a world record in freestyle events.

== Early life ==
After starting to swim at the age of five, Hontar made her debut for Ukraine at the 2018 European Championships in Dublin, Ireland, marking the beginning of her professional career. Under the guidance of her personal coach, Mykola Ilin, she has developed her skills and achieved significant milestones since 2015.

== Career ==
=== Early career (2018-2019) ===
In 2018, Hontar made her international breakthrough at the World Para Swimming European Championships in Dublin. Competing in S7 classification events, she won a gold medal in the women's 200 metre individual medley SM7 event, a silver medal in the women's 100 metre backstroke S7 event, and two bronze medals in the women's 50 metre freestyle S7 event and the women's 100 metre freestyle S7 event.

In 2019, Hontar continued competing at senior international level and won a bronze medal in the mixed 4×50 metre medley relay 20 points event at the World Para Swimming Championships.

These results between 2018 and 2019 marked her first major successes and her transition into a consistent international competitor and formed the beginning of her professional swimming career.

=== 2020–2022 ===
Hontar made her Paralympic debut at the 2020 Summer Paralympics in Tokyo, winning the bronze medal in the women's 50 metre freestyle S6 event. She also competed in the women's 100 metre freestyle S6 event, where she did not reach the podium. This medal marked her first Paralympic medal and established her as a Paralympic medalist at international level.

At the 2020 World Para Swimming European Championships in Madeira, Hontar competed in S7 classification events and won four medals. She won a gold medal in the women's 100 metre backstroke S7 event, a silver medal in the women's 200 metre individual medley SM7 event, and two bronze medals in the women's 50 metre freestyle S7 and 100 metre freestyle S7 events. These results made her one of the most successful swimmers of the championships.

At the 2022 World Para Swimming Championships in Madeira, Hontar competed in S6 classification events and achieved further international success. She won the gold medal in the women's 50 metre freestyle S6 event and a silver medal in the women's 100 metre backstroke S6 event. In addition, she won a second silver medal in the women's 100 metre freestyle S6 event, bringing her total to three medals at the championships.

=== 2023 ===
At the 2023 World Para Swimming Championships in Manchester, Hontar competed in S6 classification events and achieved one of the most successful performances of her career. She won the gold medal in the women's 50 metre freestyle S6 event and set a world record of 32.55 seconds, finishing ahead of China's Jiang Yuyan.

In addition, she won two silver medals in the women's 100 metre freestyle S6 event and the mixed 4×50 metre medley relay 20 points event. She also secured three bronze medals in the women's 100 metre backstroke SB5 event, the women's 100 metre backstroke S6 event, and the mixed 4×50 metre freestyle relay 20 points event.

At the 2023 Para Swimming World Series circuit, Hontar also competed at the Limoges meet, where she won a silver medal in the women's 100 metre breaststroke (youth), a gold medal in the women's 50 metre butterfly (youth), and bronze medals in the women's 50 metre butterfly events, including the A-final.

These results made 2023 one of the most successful years of her career, highlighted by a world record and multiple international medals across major competitions, further establishing her among the leading swimmers in her classification.

=== 2024–2025 ===
At the 2024 Summer Paralympics in Paris, Hontar competed in S6 classification events and won the bronze medal in the women's 50 metre freestyle S6 event. This marked her third Paralympic medal, confirming her consistent performances at the highest level.

She also competed in the women's 100 metre breaststroke SB5 event and the mixed 4×50 metre medley relay 20 points event, where she won bronze medals in both competitions.

At the 2025 World Para Swimming Championships in Singapore, Hontar achieved one of the strongest performances of her career. She won two gold medals in the women's 50 metre freestyle S6 and the mixed 4×50 metre freestyle relay 20 points events. She also won a silver medal in the women's 100 metre freestyle S6 event and the women's 100 metre breaststroke S6 event, as well as a bronze medal in the women's 100 metre backstroke S6 event.

These results further established Hontar as one of the leading para swimmers in her classification internationally.

== Honours and awards ==
Following her bronze medal at the 2020 Tokyo Paralympic Games, Hontar was awarded the Order of Princess Olha (third class). She has also been honored with the title of Master of Sport of International Class in Ukraine.

== Personal life ==
Outside of competition, Hontar is involved in sport-related youth and development initiatives. She is a member of the CYPE Academy, where she is engaged in projects focused on promoting inclusion in sport and supporting children’s participation in athletic activities.

She has also been involved in broader initiatives aimed at supporting young athletes and increasing accessibility to sport for children.
