= Yana Berezhna =

Ukrainian Paralympic swimmer (born 1997)

Personal information
- Born: 17 January 1997 (age 29) Kremenchuk, Ukraine

Sport
- Country: Ukraine
- Sport: Paralympic swimming
- Disability class: S11
Medal record
Summer Paralympics
Silver medal – second place	2012 London	100 m breaststroke SB11
Bronze medal – third place	2020 Tokyo	100 m breaststroke SB11
World Championships
Bronze medal – third place	2019 London	100 m breaststroke SB11
Bronze medal – third place	2022 Madeira	100 m breaststroke SB11

Yana Berezhna (Ukrainian: Яна Юріївна Бережна, born 17 January 1997) is a Ukrainian Paralympic swimmer.

== Career ==
She represented Ukraine at the 2012 Summer Paralympics in London, United Kingdom and she won the silver medal in the women's 100 metre breaststroke SB11 event. She also represented Ukraine at the 2016 Summer Paralympics and she did not win a medal at that event. In 2021, she won the bronze medal in the women's 100 metre breaststroke SB11 event at the 2020 Summer Paralympics in Tokyo, Japan.

At the 2018 World Para Swimming European Championships she won the silver medal in the women's 100 metres breaststroke SB11 event and the bronze medal in the women's 200 metres individual medley SB11 event.

At the 2019 World Para Swimming Championships held in London, United Kingdom, she won the bronze medal in the women's 100 metres breaststroke SB11 event.
