= Peggy Sonntag =

German Paralympic swimmer (born 1999)

Personal information
- Born: 13 January 1999 (age 26) Oschatz, Germany
- Home town: Leipzig, Germany

Sport
- Country: Germany
- Sport: Paralympic swimming
- Disability: Achondroplasia
- Disability class: S5
- Club: BPRSV
- Coached by: Maik Zeh

Peggy Sonntag (born 13 January 1999) is a German Paralympic swimmer who competes in international level events. Her highest achievement is reaching two finals at the 2019 World Para Swimming Championships in London and reaching fourth place in the women's 50m freestyle S5 at the 2018 World Para Swimming European Championships in Dublin.
