= Yelyzaveta Mereshko =

Ukrainian Paralympic swimmer

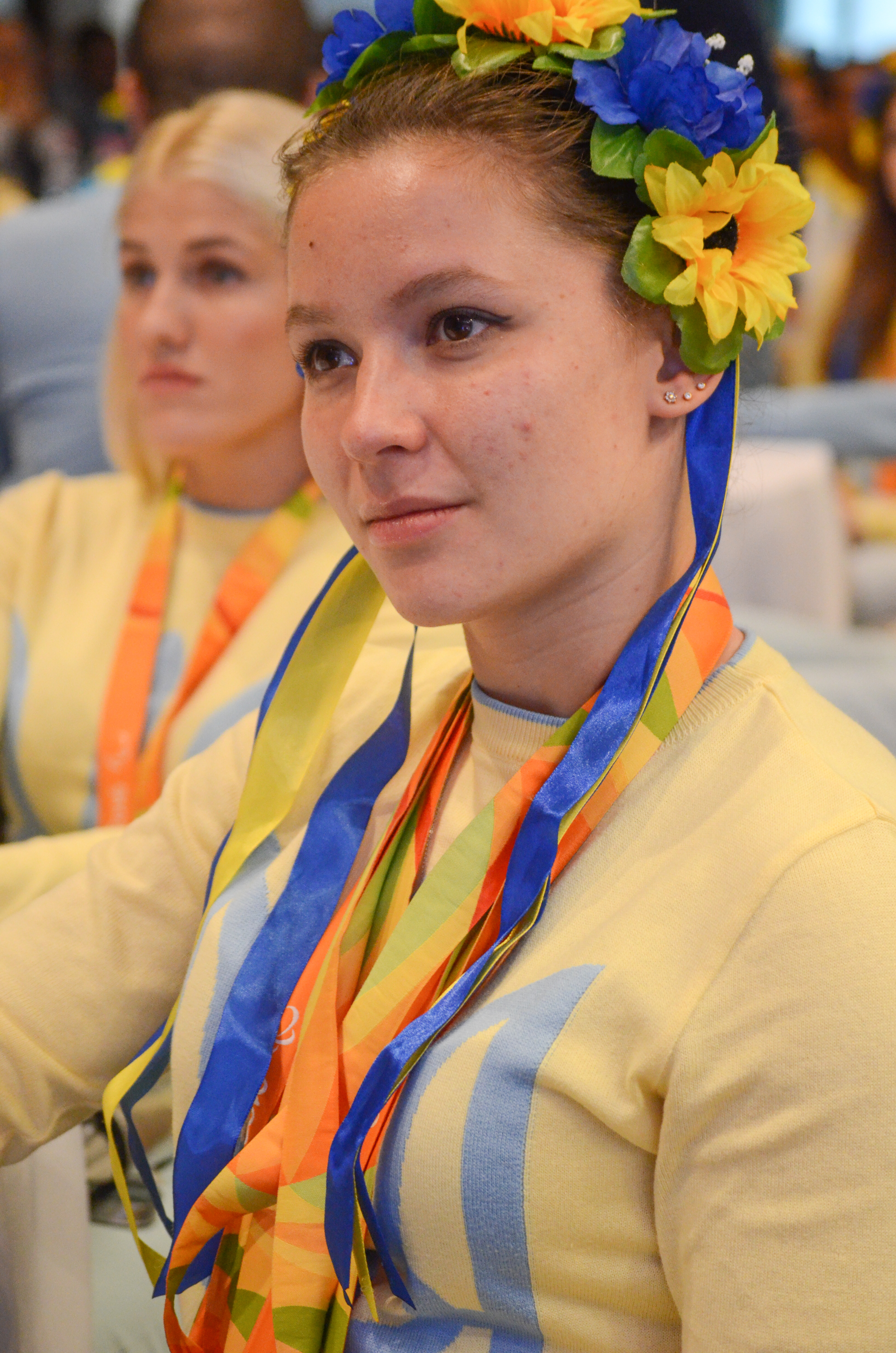
- Mereshko in 2016

Personal information
- Born: 8 July 1992 (age 33) Kherson, Ukraine

Sport
- Sport: Swimming
- Club: Sport Life
- Coach: Ella Benedyk
Medal record
Women's para swimming
Representing Ukraine
Paralympic Games
Gold medal – first place	2016 Rio de Janeiro	50 m freestyle S6
Gold medal – first place	2016 Rio de Janeiro	100 m freestyle S6
Gold medal – first place	2016 Rio de Janeiro	400 m freestyle S6
Gold medal – first place	2020 Tokyo	50 m freestyle S6
Gold medal – first place	2020 Tokyo	100 m breaststroke SB5
Silver medal – second place	2020 Tokyo	400 m freestyle S6
Silver medal – second place	2020 Tokyo	200 m ind. medley SM6
Bronze medal – third place	2016 Rio de Janeiro	Mixed 4×50 m freestyle 20pts
Bronze medal – third place	2020 Tokyo	100 m freestyle S7
World Championships
Gold medal – first place	2015 Glasgow	50 m backstroke S6
Gold medal – first place	2015 Glasgow	100 m backstroke S6
Gold medal – first place	2015 Glasgow	50 m freestyle S6
Gold medal – first place	2015 Glasgow	100 m freestyle S6
Gold medal – first place	2019 London	100 m breaststroke SB5
Gold medal – first place	2019 London	50 m freestyle S6
Silver medal – second place	2015 Glasgow	Mixed 4×50m freestyle relay
Silver medal – second place	2015 Glasgow	200 m medley SM6
Silver medal – second place	2019 London	100 m freestyle S6
Silver medal – second place	2019 London	200 m medley SB6
Silver medal – second place	2019 London	400 m freestyle S6
Bronze medal – third place	2019 London	Mixed 4×50m medley relay
European Championships
Gold medal – first place	2014 Eindhoven	4x50m freestyle relay 20pts
Gold medal – first place	2014 Eindhoven	4x50m medley relay 20pts
Gold medal – first place	2014 Eindhoven	50m freestyle S6
Gold medal – first place	2014 Eindhoven	100m freestyle S6
Gold medal – first place	2018 Dublin	100 m freestyle S6
Gold medal – first place	2018 Dublin	50 m freestyle S6
Gold medal – first place	2018 Dublin	400 m freestyle S6
Gold medal – first place	2018 Dublin	100 m breaststroke SB5
Gold medal – first place	2020 Funchal	200 m medley SM6
Gold medal – first place	2020 Funchal	100 m breaststroke SB5
Gold medal – first place	2020 Funchal	50 m freestyle S6
Gold medal – first place	2020 Funchal	100 m freestyle S6
Silver medal – second place	2014 Eindhoven	200m freestyle S6
Silver medal – second place	2016 Funchal	200m medley SM6
Silver medal – second place	2016 Funchal	100 m breaststroke SB6
Silver medal – second place	2016 Funchal	50 m freestyle S6
Silver medal – second place	2018 Dublin	100 m backstroke S6
Silver medal – second place	2018 Dublin	200 m medley S6
Silver medal – second place	2020 Funchal	400 m freestyle S6
Bronze medal – third place	2016 Funchal	100 m backstroke S6
Bronze medal – third place	2020 Funchal	100 m backstroke S6

Yelyzaveta "Liza" Mereshko (born 8 July 1992) is a Ukrainian Paralympic swimmer. In 2015, she set the world record for the S6 100m freestyle event.

Mereshko took silver in the SM6 200m Individual Medley at the 2019 World Para Swimming Championships in London. She was beaten by Maisie Summers-Newton who created a new world record for the Medley when she beat Mereshko. The record had been set earlier that year by Summers-Newton in Glasgow.
