= Nataliia Butkova =

Russian Paralympic swimmer

Personal information
- Nationality: Russian
- Born: 14 July 1991 (age 34) Volgograd, Russian SFSR, Soviet Union (now Russia)

Sport
- Sport: Paralympic swimming
- Disability class: SM4, S4
- Club: Volgograd Regional Centre of Adaptive Sports Development
- Coached by: Irina Akhmerova
Medal record
Women's para swimming
Representing RPC
Paralympic Games
| Silver medal – second place | 2020 Tokyo | 50m breaststroke SB3 |
| Bronze medal – third place | 2020 Tokyo | 150 m ind. medley SM4 |
Representing Russia
World Championships
| Silver medal – second place | 2019 London | mixed 4x50m freestyle relay 20pts |
European Championships
| Bronze medal – third place | 2020 Funchal | 50 m freestyle S4 |
Representing Neutral Paralympic Athletes
Paralympic Games
| Silver medal – second place | 2024 Paris | 150 m ind. medley SM4 |
European Championships
| Silver medal – second place | 2024 Funchal | 50 m freestyle S4 |
| Silver medal – second place | 2024 Funchal | 150 m ind. medley SM4 |

Nataliia Butkova (born 14 July 1991) is a Russian Paralympic swimmer. She represented Russian Paralympic Committee athletes at the 2020 Summer Paralympics.

== Career ==
Butkova represented Russian Paralympic Committee athletes at the 2020 Summer Paralympics in the women's 150 metre individual medley SM4 event and won a bronze medal.
