= Kateryna Denysenko =

Ukrainian Paralympic swimmer

Personal information
- Nationality: Ukrainian
- Born: 7 March 1994 (age 32) Kyiv, Ukraine

Sport
- Sport: Paralympic swimming
- Disability class: S8
- Club: Invasport
- Coached by: Olena Salnikova
Medal record
Women's para swimming
Representing Ukraine
Paralympic Games
Silver medal – second place	2020 Tokyo	100 m backstroke S8
World Championships
Silver medal – second place	2022 Madeira	100 m backstroke S8
Bronze medal – third place	2022 Madeira	50 m freestyle S8
European Championships
Silver medal – second place	2018 Dublin	100 m butterfly S8
Silver medal – second place	2020 Funchal	100 m backstroke S8
Bronze medal – third place	2018 Dublin	50 m freestyle S8
Bronze medal – third place	2018 Dublin	100 m backstroke S8

Kateryna Denysenko (born 7 March 1994) is a Ukrainian Paralympic swimmer. She represented Ukraine at the 2020 Summer Paralympics.

== Career ==
Denysenko represented Ukraine in the women's 100 metre backstroke event at the 2020 Summer Paralympics and won a silver medal.

== Personal life ==
Her husband, Iaroslav, is also a Paralympic swimmer for Ukraine.
