= Erel Halevi =

Israeli swimmer (born 1991)

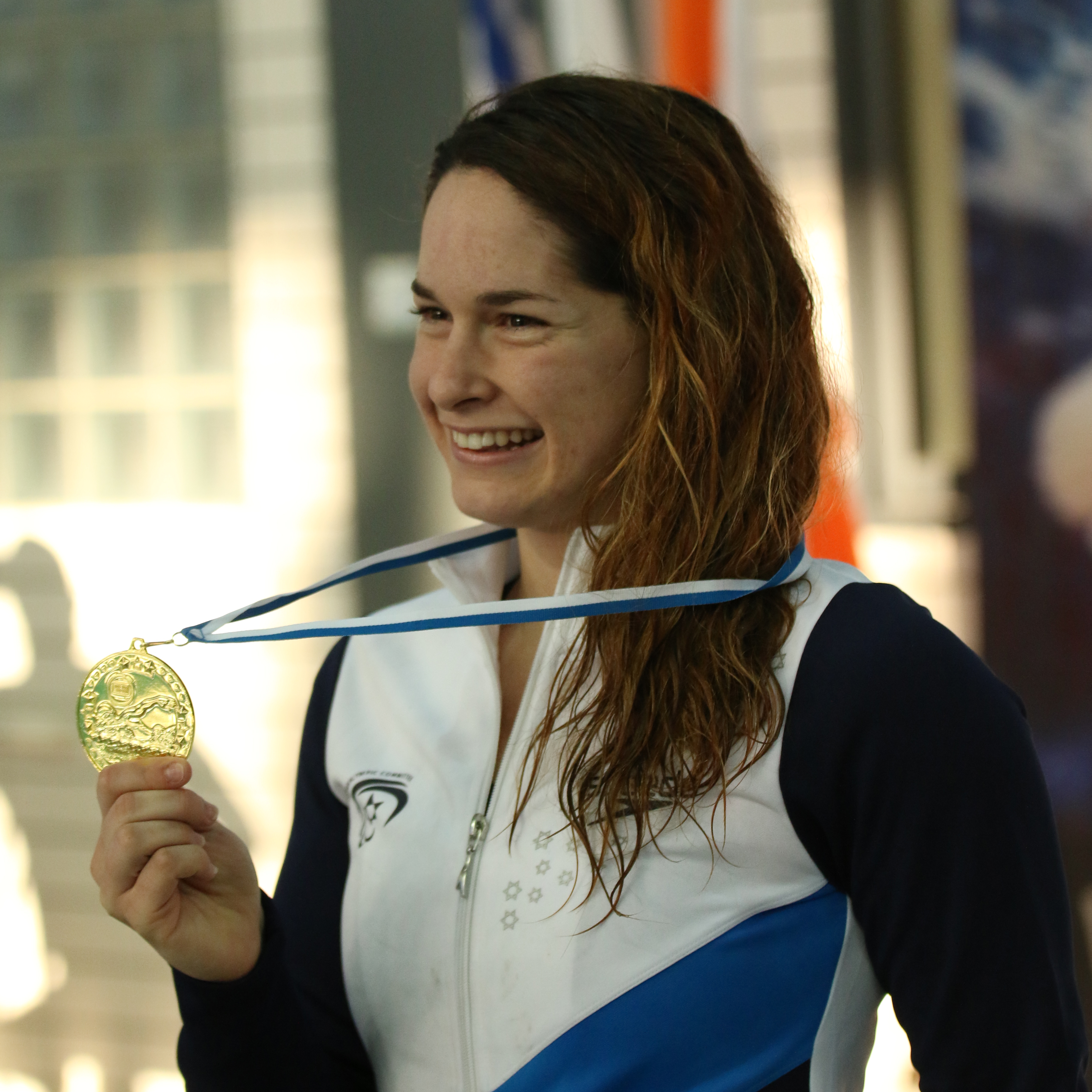
- Erel Halevi in 2016

Personal information
- Native name: אראל הלוי
- National team: Israel
- Born: January 13, 1991 (age 35)
- Education: Bar-Ilan University

Sport
- Country: Israel
- Sport: Swimming
- Disability class: S7
- Coached by: Yaakov Banison; Noach Ram
Medal record
Event / 1st / 2nd / 3rd; European Championships / 0 / 0 / 2
Women's para swimming
Representing Israel
European Championships
Bronze medal – third place	2009 Reykjavik	50 meter freestyle
Bronze medal – third place	2016 Funchal	50 meter freestyle
- Updated on 28 November 2017

Erel Halevi (Hebrew: אראל הלוי; born 13 January 1991) is an Israeli swimmer, who competes for her nation internationally. As well as taking part in the 2012 and 2016 Summer Paralympics, she has also won two bronze medals at the IPC Swimming European Championships.

== Career ==
Erel Halevi was born on 13 January 1991. At the age of 11, she became reliant on a wheelchair due to an autoimmune disease, learning to walk on crutches after some time. Halevi underwent rehabilitation at Sheba Medical Center for several years, but saw no further improvement in her condition. She remained positive, as she had already seen progress in moving from the wheelchair to crutches. Although given the option not to serve due to her medical condition, Halevi volunteered for the Israeli Navy as she felt that serving in the Israel Defense Forces formed a part of a normal life for people from her country.

She learned to swim through the Israeli Foundation for Handicapped Children (ILAN), where she was spotted by coach Yaakov Banison. He pushed her, as he saw the potential for Halevi to go to the Summer Paralympics. She made the ILAN team, and then the national team. Her first major event was the 2009 IPC Swimming European Championships, where she won a bronze medal in the women's 50 meter freestyle in the S7 disability classification. At the 2011 IPC Swimming European Championships, she finished fourth in the 400 meters freestyle. Prior to the 2012 Summer Paralympics, Halevi took part in the Berlin Swimming Open, where she won a gold medal in the 400 meters freestyle. At the Paralympics, she finished 12th overall in the 50 meters freestyle among her other events.

Halevi won a further bronze medal in the 50 meter freestyle at the 2016 IPC Swimming European Championships in Funchal, Madeira. She finished behind the UK's Susie Rodgers and Germany's Denise Grahl. Halevi also made the finals of the 100 meters freestyle and the 400 meters freestyle, but finished in fifth place on each occasion. She was named to the Israeli team for the 2016 Summer Paralympics in Rio de Janeiro, Brazil.
