= Viktoriia Ishchiulova =

Russian Paralympic swimmer

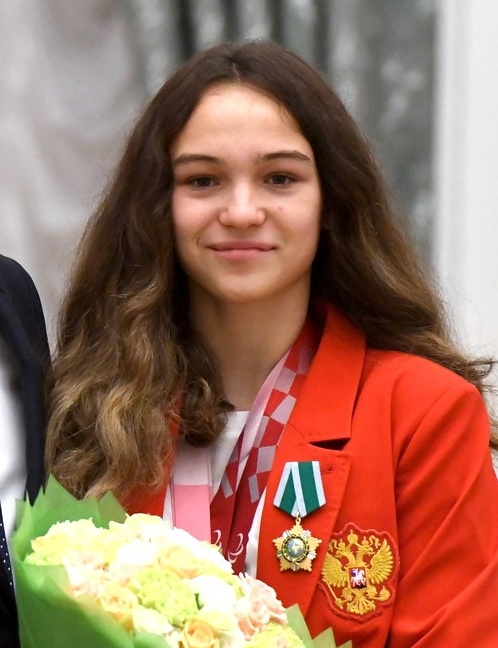
- Ishchiulova in 2021

Personal information
- Nationality: Russian
- Born: 17 September 2004 (age 21) Orsk, Russia

Sport
- Sport: Paralympic swimming
- Disability class: S8, SB8, SM8
- Club: Nadezhda Youth Sports School
- Coached by: Irina Simakova; Olga Sidorova
Medal record
Women's para swimming
Representing RPC
Paralympic Games
Gold medal – first place	2020 Tokyo	50 m freestyle S8
Silver medal – second place	2020 Tokyo	100 m butterfly S8
Silver medal – second place	2020 Tokyo	4×100 m medley 34pts
Representing Neutral Paralympic Athletes
Paralympic Games
Silver medal – second place	2024 Paris	100 m backstroke S8
Silver medal – second place	2024 Paris	100 m butterfly S8
Silver medal – second place	2024 Paris	200 m ind. medley SM8
Bronze medal – third place	2024 Paris	100 m breaststroke SB8
Bronze medal – third place	2024 Paris	50 m freestyle S8
World Championships
Gold medal – first place	2025 Singapore	50 m freestyle S8
Silver medal – second place	2025 Singapore	100 m backstroke S8
Silver medal – second place	2025 Singapore	100 m butterfly S8
Silver medal – second place	2025 Singapore	200 m ind. medley SM8
European Championships
Gold medal – first place	2024 Funchal	50 m freestyle S8
Gold medal – first place	2024 Funchal	100 m backstroke S8
Gold medal – first place	2024 Funchal	200 m ind. medley SM8
Bronze medal – third place	2024 Funchal	100 m breaststroke SB8
Representing Russia
World Championships
Bronze medal – third place	2019 London	100 m butterfly S8
Bronze medal – third place	2019 London	200 m ind. medley SM8
European Championships
Gold medal – first place	2020 Funchal	50 m freestyle S8
Gold medal – first place	2020 Funchal	100 m backstroke S8
Gold medal – first place	2026 Kocaeli	100 m backstroke S8
Silver medal – second place	2020 Funchal	100 m freestyle S8

Viktoriia Ishchiulova (Russian: Виктория Ищиулова, born 17 September 2004) is a Russian Paralympic swimmer. Ishchiulova competed at the 2020 and 2024 Summer Paralympics.

== Career ==
Ishchiulova represented Russian Paralympic Committee athletes at the 2020 Summer Paralympics and won gold in the 50 metre freestyle S8 event and won silver in the 100 metre butterfly S8 and the 4 × 100 m medley relay events.
