= Sabine Weber-Treiber =

Austrian Paralympic swimmer

Personal information
- Born: 19 January 1979 (age 47) Vienna, Austria
- Height: 1.67 m (5 ft 6 in)

Sport
- Country: Austria
- Sport: Paralympic swimming
- Disability: Paraplegia
- Disability class: S6, SB5
- Event(s): Freestyle swimming Breaststroke
- Club: BSV Weißer Hof, Klosterneuburg, Austria
- Coached by: Thomas Rosenberger
Medal record
Paralympic swimming
Representing Austria
World Championships
Gold medal – first place	2017 Mexico City	50m freestyle S6
Bronze medal – third place	2023 Manchester	50m freestyle S7
European Championships
Silver medal – second place	2014 Eindhoven	100m breaststroke SB5
Silver medal – second place	2018 Dublin	50m freestyle S7

Sabine Weber-Treiber (born 19 January 1979) is an Austrian Paralympic swimmer who competes in international level events.

== Career ==
She was a two-time finalist at the Summer Paralympics. She took up swimming as part of rehabilitation when she contracted a viral infection that affected her spinal cord.
