= Xenia Palazzo =

Italian Paralympic swimmer (born 1998)

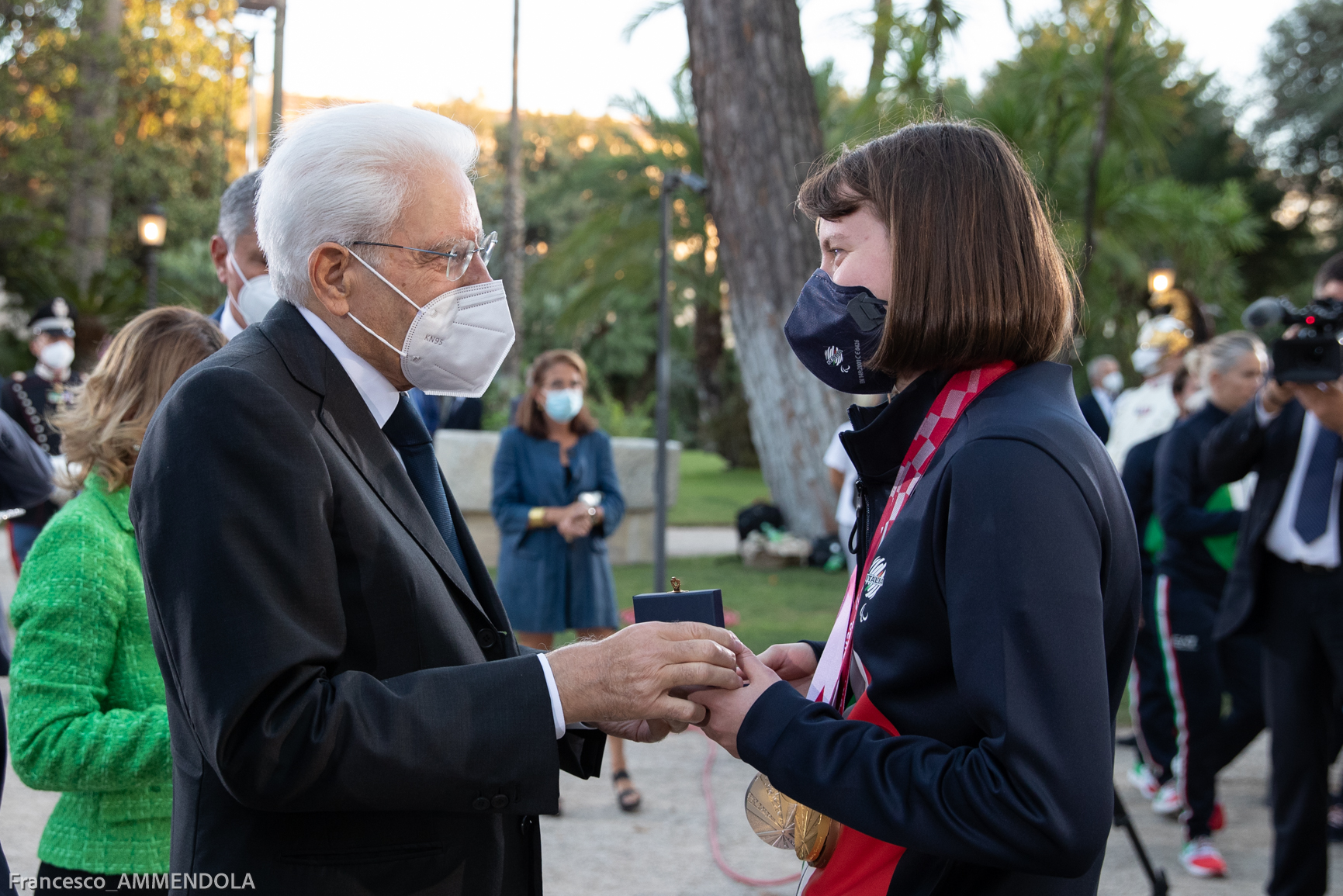
- Palazzo awarded by the Italian President Sergio Mattarella at Quirinale Palace in 2021.

Personal information
- Full name: Xenia Francesca Palazzo
- National team: Italy
- Born: 29 April 1998 (age 28) Palermo, Italy
- Height: 1.69 m (5 ft 7 in)

Sport
- Sport: Paralympic swimming
- Disability: Hypoxic ischemic encephalopathy
- Disability class: S8
Medal record
Paralympic swimming
Representing Italy
| Event | 1st | 2nd | 3rd |
|---|---|---|---|
| Paralympics | 2 | 1 | 3 |
| World Championships | 6 | 6 | 2 |
| European Championships | 7 | 8 | 2 |
| Total | 15 | 15 | 7 |
Paralympic Games
| Gold medal – first place | 2020 Tokyo | Women's 4×100 m freestyle relay 34pts |
| Gold medal – first place | 2024 Paris | Mixed 4×100 m freestyle relay 34pts |
| Silver medal – second place | 2020 Tokyo | 200 m indiv. medley SM8 |
| Bronze medal – third place | 2020 Tokyo | 50 m freestyle S8 |
| Bronze medal – third place | 2020 Tokyo | 400 m freestyle S8 |
| Bronze medal – third place | 2024 Paris | 400 m freestyle S8 |
World Championships
| Gold medal – first place | 2023 Manchester | Mixed 4×100 m freestyle relay 34pts |
| Gold medal – first place | 2023 Manchester | Women's 400 freestyle S8 |
| Gold medal – first place | 2022 Madeira | Mixed 4×100 m freestyle relay 34pts |
| Gold medal – first place | 2022 Madeira | 100 m freestyle S8 |
| Gold medal – first place | 2022 Madeira | 100 m backstroke S8 |
| Gold medal – first place | 2022 Madeira | 200 m ind. medley SM8 |
| Silver medal – second place | 2019 London | 400 m freestyle S8 |
| Silver medal – second place | 2022 Madeira | 400 m freestyle S8 |
| Silver medal – second place | 2022 Madeira | 50 m freestyle S8 |
| Silver medal – second place | 2023 Manchester | Mixed 4×100 m medley relay 34pts |
| Silver medal – second place | 2023 Manchester | 100 m freestyle S8 |
| Silver medal – second place | 2023 Manchester | 100 m backstroke S8 |
| Silver medal – second place | 2025 Singapore | 100 m freestyle S8 |
| Bronze medal – third place | 2023 Manchester | 200 m medley SM8 |
| Bronze medal – third place | 2025 Singapore | 50 m freestyle S8 |
European Championships
| Gold medal – first place | 2018 Dublin | 400 m freestyle S8 |
| Gold medal – first place | 2018 Dublin | 200 m medley SM8 |
| Silver medal – second place | 2018 Dublin | 50 m freestyle S8 |
| Silver medal – second place | 2018 Dublin | 100 m freestyle S8 |

Xenia Francesca Palazzo (born 29 April 1998) is an Italian Paralympic swimmer of Russian descent who competes in international level events, She competed at the 2016 Summer Paralympics, and 2020 Summer Paralympics, in Women's 100m Backstroke - S8, Women's 200 individual medley SM8 winning a silver medal, Women's 4×100 freestyle relay P34 winning a gold medal, Women's 400 freestyle S8 winning a bronze medal and in Women's 50 metre freestyle S8, winning a bronze medal.

== Life ==
She was born with hypoxic ischemic encephalopathy which has caused her to not have enough oxygen and blood due to disseminated intravascular coagulation and had a brain haemorrhage which has resulted in quadriplegia mainly on the right side of her body.

Her highest achievements are becoming a World silver medalist and a European champion, in 200 meter medley and 400 meter freestyle.

== See also ==
- Italy at the 2020 Summer Paralympics
