= Zara Mullooly =

British Paralympic swimmer

Personal information
- Born: 11 September 2002 (age 23) Ascot, Great Britain

Sport
- Country: Great Britain
- Sport: Paralympic swimming
- Disability class: S10
- Event: Freestyle swimming
- Club: Leeds University Aquatics SC
- Coached by: Jacob Greenhalgh
Medal record
Paralympic swimming
Representing Great Britain
World Championships
Silver medal – second place	2019 London	Women's 50m freestyle S10
Bronze medal – third place	2019 London	Women's 400m freestyle S10
European Championships
Gold medal – first place	2018 Dublin	Women's 4x100m medley relay 34pts
Silver medal – second place	2018 Dublin	Women's 50m freestyle S10
Bronze medal – third place	2018 Dublin	Women's 100m freestyle S10

Zara Mullooly (born 11 September 2002) is a British Paralympic swimmer who competes in International level freestyle events. She is British Record holder in 50m, 100m, 200m, and 400m freestyle for the S10 classification. Zara has congenital right side hemiplegia, a form of cerebral palsy.

== Early life ==
Zara grew up in Woking, Surrey, where she attended Guildford High School.

Shortly after her first birthday, Zara was referred by her GP to a consultant orthopaedic surgeon after her parents noticed she walked with a limp. Investigations showed Zara’s left arm and leg limb length to be greater than her right, and an X-ray of her pelvic bone showed an obvious size difference between the left and right side. The consultant diagnosed Zara with hemihypertrophy, and for the next four years, Zara attended hospital ultrasound scan appointments every three months to check for any sign of Wilms tumour.

A change in Zara’s Consultant led to further investigations and a subsequent new diagnosis of right side hemiplegia, and this was confirmed by an MRI brain scan in 2008. Zara then underwent serial casting on her right leg every fortnight, over the following six months, in an effort to lengthen her shortened tendons.

== Personal life ==
Zara is currently studying an Undergraduate degree in Law at the University of Leeds.

== Career ==
Zara began swimming lessons at the age of three, and joined Woking Swimming Club when she was eight years old. At aged nine, Zara began to compete, but when officials disqualified most butterfly, breaststroke, and individual medley races she competed in, due to her right leg and arm dragging in the water, Zara’s coach suggested that she apply for a swimming classification for disabled swimmers. In June 2013 Zara was officially classified as an S10 swimmer, which refers to athletes with the least physical impairment. Shortly afterwards, Zara was contacted by the ASA Disability Talent Officer, which then led to her joining the England Talent Program.

Zara made her international debut in April 2015, aged twelve, at the German Para International Meet in Berlin. One year later, Mullooly was confirmed on the GB Team and swam in her first major competition - the IPC European Championships in Funchal, Maderia. She swam in 50m, 100m, and 400m freestyle events, and made the finals in 50m freestyle, finishing 7th in a time of 29.94 seconds, and 8th in 400m freestyle in a time of 5:02.53, the youngest competitor in both, aged thirteen years.

Zara missed the chance to compete at her first World Championships in Mexico the following year in 2017, as the British team were unable to attend due to the Puebla earthquake.

The World Para Swimming European Championships 2018 in Dublin saw Mullooly secure her first major medals; winning Bronze in 100m freestyle, Silver in 50m freestyle, and Gold as part of the 34 point medley relay alongside teammates Alice Tai, Maisie Summers-Newton, and Toni Shaw.

In 2019, Mullooly earned her chance to compete at the World Para Swimming World Championships in London. She swam new British Record times in 50m, 100m, and 400m freestyle, winning the bronze medal in 400m in a time of 4:34.91, and a silver medal in 50m in 28.22 seconds.
