= Susana Veiga =

Portuguese Paralympic swimmer

Personal information
- Nationality: Portuguese
- Born: 28 November 2000 (age 25) Lisbon, Portugal

Sport
- Country: Portugal
- Sport: Paralympic swimming
- Disability class: S10, S9
- Event: freestyle
- Coached by: Nuno Quintanilha

Achievements and titles
- Personal best: 50 freestyle 28.85
Medal record
Paralympic swimming
Representing Portugal
World Championships
Silver medal – second place	2019 London	50m freestyle S9
Silver medal – second place	2022 Madeira	50m freestyle S9
European Championships
Gold medal – first place	2020 Funchal	50m freestyle S9
Silver medal – second place	2018 Dublin	50m freestyle S9
Silver medal – second place	2020 Funchal	100m freestyle S9

Susana Veiga (born 8 April 2000) is a Portuguese Paralympic swimmer who competes in international elite events. She specializes in freestyle, S9. She competed at the 2020 Summer Paralympics in 50 freestyle S10 and 100 freestyle S9.

== Career ==
She competed at the, 2018 European Para Swimming Championships winning the Silver in 50 freestyle S9, 2019 World Para Swimming Championships, 2020 European Para Swimming Championships winning a silver medal, and 2021 European Para Swimming Championships, winning a gold medal and European Record.
