= Susannah Kaul =

Estonian Paralympic swimmer (born 1999)

Personal information
- Born: 20 April 1999 (age 27) Tallinn, Estonia
- Height: 1.60 m (5 ft 3 in)

Sport
- Country: Estonia
- Sport: Paralympic swimming
- Disability class: S10
Medal record
Paralympic swimming
Representing Estonia
World Championships
Bronze medal – third place	2017 Mexico City	50m freestyle S10
European Championships
Silver medal – second place	2020 Funchal	50m freestyle S10

Susannah Kaul (born 20 April 1999) is an Estonian Paralympic swimmer who competes at international elite competitions.

== Biography ==
She is a World bronze medalist and a European silver medalist in freestyle swimming and has qualified for the 2020 Summer Paralympics.

=== Family ===
Her sister Maria Lota Kaul is a professional tennis player.
