= Marian Polo López =

Spanish Paralympic swimmer (born 2000)

Personal information
- Born: 1 November 2000 (age 25) Barcelona, Spain

Sport
- Sport: Paralympic swimming
- Disability: Nystagmus, ocular albinism
- Disability class: S13
Medal record
Representing Spain
World Championships
| Gold medal – first place | 2025 Singapore | Mixed 4×100m freestyle relay 49pts |
| Silver medal – second place | 2017 Mexico City | 100m breaststroke SB13 |
| Silver medal – second place | 2022 Madeira | Mixed 4x100m freestyle relay 49pts |
| Silver medal – second place | 2022 Madeira | Mixed 4x100m medley relay 49pts |
| Bronze medal – third place | 2017 Mexico City | 50m freestyle S13 |
| Silver medal – second place | 2025 Singapore | Mixed 4×100m medley relay 49pts |
| Silver medal – second place | 2025 Singapore | 50 m freestyle S13 |
European Championships
| Silver medal – second place | 2024 Madeira | 50m freestyle S13 |
| Silver medal – second place | 2024 Madeira | 100m breaststroke SB13 |
| Bronze medal – third place | 2018 Dublin | 50m freestyle S13 |
| Bronze medal – third place | 2018 Dublin | 100m backstroke S13 |
| Bronze medal – third place | 2024 Madeira | 100m backstroke S13 |
| Bronze medal – third place | 2024 Madeira | 200m individual medley SM13 |
| Bronze medal – third place | 2026 Kocaeli | 100m butterfly S13 |

Marian Polo López (born 1 November 2000) is a Spanish Paralympic swimmer who competes in international swimming competitions, she is a four-time World medalist and six-time European medalist. She competed at the 2016 Summer Paralympics but did not medal.
