= Claire Supiot =

French swimmer and para-swimmer

Personal information
- Born: 28 February 1968 (age 58) Angers, France

Sport
- Sport: Swimming
- Classifications: S8
Medal record
Representing France
Women's swimming
Mediterranean Games
Silver medal – second place	1987 Latakia	400 m freestyle
Women's para swimming
World Championships
Bronze medal – third place	2019 London	50m freestyle S8
Bronze medal – third place	2019 London	100m freestyle S8
European Championships
Gold medal – first place	2018 Dublin	50 m freestyle S8
Silver medal – second place	2018 Dublin	400 m freestyle S8
Bronze medal – third place	2018 Dublin	100m freestyle S8
Bronze medal – third place	2018 Dublin	200m ind. medley SM8

Claire Supiot (born 28 February 1968) is a French swimmer. She competed in the women's 200 metre butterfly at the 1988 Summer Olympics and won silver medal in the 400 m freestyle event at the 1987 Mediterranean Games.

Supiot was diagnosed with Charcot-Marie-Tooth disease in 2007 and started para swimming in 2015. She won medals at the 2018 World Para Swimming European Championships and the 2019 World Para Swimming Championships.
