= Megan Richter =

British Paralympic athlete (born 2000)

Personal information
- Nationality: British
- Born: 29 December 2000 (age 25) Birmingham, England, Great Britain

Sport
- Country: Great Britain
- Sport: Paralympic swimming
- Disability class: S8, SB7, SM8
- Club: Orion Swimming Club, Birmingham, England
- Coached by: Carl Flynn
Medal record
Representing Great Britain
Women's paratriathlon
Paralympic Games
Gold medal – first place	2024 Paris	PTS4
World Championships
Silver medal – second place	2024 Torremolinos	Mixed relay
European Championships
Gold medal – first place	2024 Vichy	PTS4
Women's para-swimming
World Championships
Bronze medal – third place	2019 London	100 m backstroke S8
European Championships
Silver medal – second place	2018 Dublin	100 m backstroke S8
Silver medal – second place	2018 Dublin	200 m ind. medley SM8
Bronze medal – third place	2018 Dublin	100 m breaststroke SB7

Megan Richter (born 29 December 2000) is a British Paralympic swimmer who competes in international level events. She has won a bronze medal for her backstroke in 2019 at the world championships. She has also competed in paratriathlon, and won the gold medal at 2024 Summer Paralympics in Paris.
