= Anna Krivshina =

Russian Paralympic swimmer

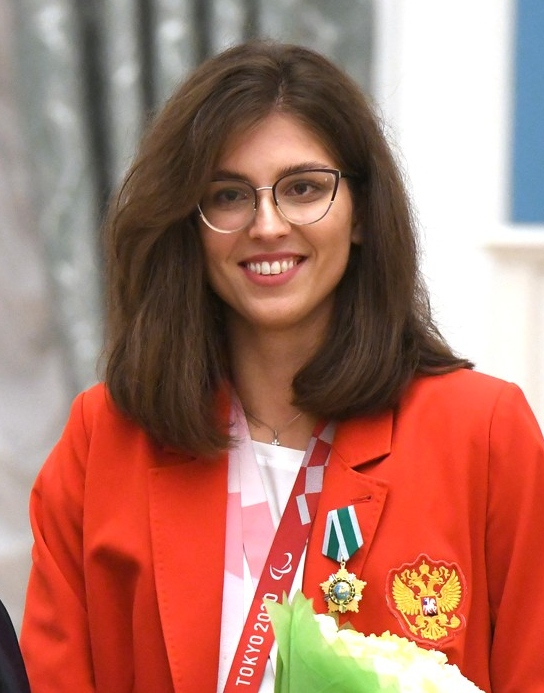
- Krivshina in 2021

Personal information
- Born: 15 May 1996 (age 30) Ozyorsk, Chelyabinsk Oblast, Russia

Sport
- Country: Russia
- Sport: Paralympic swimming
- Disability class: S12, SB12, SM12
- Club: Bashkortostan Republican Adaptive Sports School of Paralympic Reserve
- Coached by: Guzel Tveryakova
Medal record
Representing RPC
Paralympic Games
Gold medal – first place	2020 Tokyo	mixed 4×100 m freestyle relay 49pts
Silver medal – second place	2020 Tokyo	50 m freestyle S13
Representing Russia
World Championships
Gold medal – first place	2013 Montreal	100 m backstroke S13
Gold medal – first place	2015 Glasgow	50 m freestyle S13
Gold medal – first place	2015 Glasgow	100 m backstroke S13
Gold medal – first place	2019 London	100 m backstroke S12
Silver medal – second place	2019 London	50 m freestyle S12
Silver medal – second place	2019 London	100 m freestyle S12
Silver medal – second place	2013 Montreal	50 m freestyle S13
Bronze medal – third place	2019 London	mixed 4×100 m freestyle relay 49pts
Bronze medal – third place	2013 Montreal	100 m freestyle S13
European Championships
Gold medal – first place	2026 Kocaeli	50 m freestyle S12

Anna Aleksandrovna Krivshina (Russian: Анна Александровна Крившина; born 15 May 1996) is a Russian Paralympic swimmer. At the 2020 Summer Paralympics, she won a gold medal in the mixed 4 × 100 metre freestyle relay 49pts event and a silver medal in the women's 50 m freestyle S13 event.

== Career ==
Krivshina took up swimming at the age of 12. Her first coach was Yuri Mikhailovich Sereda, although she also considers her mother, a former competitive swimmer, as her first coach. In 2012, her new coach became Igor Lvovich Tveriakov, with whom she won the 2013 World Championships with a World Record.

Krivshina attends the Bashkir State Pedagogical University, where she is studying physical culture. However, in the future she wants to be a TV presenter.

Krivshina has a visual impairment. She can't see with her left eye, and has a low vision on her right eye.
