= Denise Grahl =

German Paralympic swimmer

Personal information
- Born: 4 May 1993 (age 33)

Sport
- Country: Germany
- Sport: Paralympic swimming
- Disability class: S7
Medal record
Women's para swimming
Representing Germany
Paralympic Games
Silver medal – second place	2016 Rio de Janeiro	50 m freestyle S7
World Championships
Bronze medal – third place	2022 Madeira	50 m freestyle S7
Bronze medal – third place	2022 Madeira	100m freestyle S7
European Championships
Gold medal – first place	2018 Dublin	50 m freestyle S7
Gold medal – first place	2018 Dublin	100 m freestyle S7
Gold medal – first place	2018 Dublin	50 m butterfly S7
Silver medal – second place	2018 Dublin	400 m freestyle S7
Silver medal – second place	2014 Eindhoven	50 m freestyle S7
Silver medal – second place	2014 Eindhoven	100 m freestyle S7
Bronze medal – third place	2014 Eindhoven	50 m butterfly S7

Denise Grahl (born 4 May 1993) is a German Paralympic swimmer.

== Career ==
She represented Germany at the 2016 Summer Paralympics and won a silver medal in the women's 50 metre freestyle S7 event.

At the 2018 World Para Swimming European Championships she won the gold medals in the women's 50 metres freestyle S7, women's 100 metres freestyle S7 and women's 50 metres butterfly S7 events. She also won the silver medal in the women's 400 metres freestyle S7 event.
