= Amalie Vinther =

Danish Paralympic swimmer (born 1995)

Personal information
- Full name: Amalie Østergaard Vinther
- Nickname: Malle
- Born: 24 December 1995 (age 30) Viborg, Denmark
- Height: 1.71 m (5 ft 7 in)

Sport
- Country: Denmark
- Sport: Paralympic swimming
- Disability: Hemiplegia
- Disability class: S8
- Club: Aarhus Swim
- Coached by: Bjarne Kragh
Medal record
Paralympic swimming
Representing Denmark
World Championships
Bronze medal – third place	2010 Eindhoven	Women's 100m freestyle S8
Bronze medal – third place	2010 Eindhoven	Women's 400m freestyle S8
Bronze medal – third place	2013 Montreal	Women's 100m freestyle S8
Bronze medal – third place	2013 Montreal	Women's 400m freestyle S8
European Championships
Gold medal – first place	2014 Eindhoven	Women's 400m freestyle S8
Gold medal – first place	2016 Funchal	Women's 400m freestyle S8
Silver medal – second place	2014 Eindhoven	Women's 100m freestyle S8
Silver medal – second place	2016 Funchal	Women's 100m freestyle S8
Bronze medal – third place	2014 Eindhoven	Women's 100m butterfly S8
Bronze medal – third place	2014 Eindhoven	Women's 200m individual medley SM8
Bronze medal – third place	2016 Funchal	Women's 200m individual medley SM8
Bronze medal – third place	2018 Dublin	Women's 4x100m medley relay 34pts

Amalie Østergaard Vinther (born 24 December 1995) is a Danish Paralympic swimmer who competes in international level events.

== Biography ==
Vinther is a double European champion and a four-time World bronze medalist in freestyle swimming. She has competed in the 2012 and 2016 Summer Paralympics and has qualified for the 2020 Summer Paralympics.
