= Alessia Scortechini =

Italian Paralympic swimmer

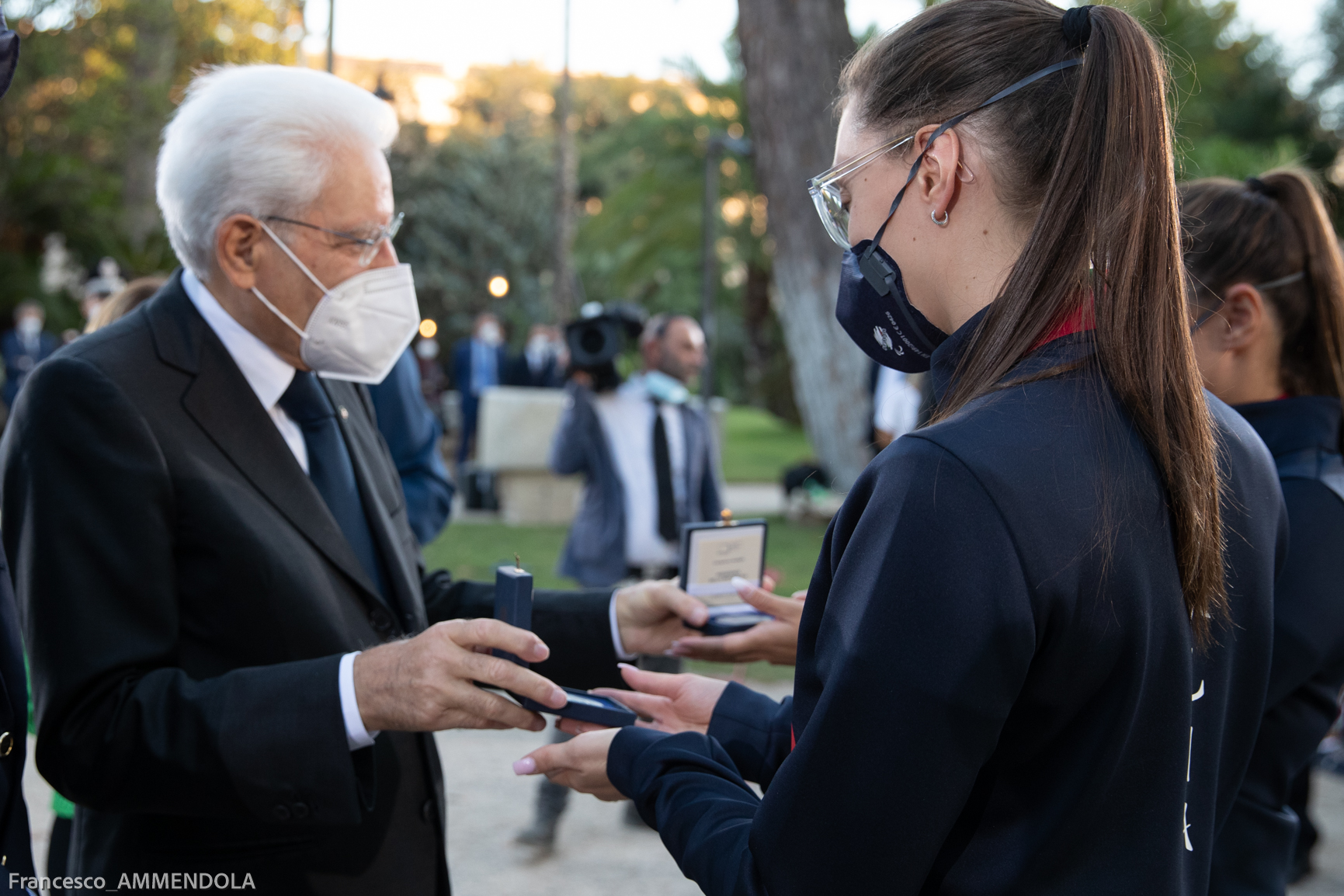
- Scortechini, on the right half hidden by Vittoria Bianco (in the foreground with glasses) awarded by Sergio Mattarella at Quirinale in 2021.

Personal information
- Nickname: Scortys
- National team: Italy
- Born: 11 February 1997 (age 29) Rome, Italy
- Height: 1.65 m (5 ft 5 in)

Sport
- Country: Italy
- Sport: Paralympic swimming
- Disability class: S10
Medal record
Paralympic swimming
Representing Italy
| Event | 1st | 2nd | 3rd |
|---|---|---|---|
| Paralympics | 1 | 0 | 1 |
| World Championships | 2 | 4 | 0 |
| European Championships | 3 | 1 | 4 |
| Total | 6 | 5 | 5 |
Paralympic Games
| Gold medal – first place | 2020 Tokyo | 4 × 100 metre freestyle relay 34pts |
| Bronze medal – third place | 2024 Paris | 100 m freestyle S10 |
World Championships
| Gold medal – first place | 2017 Mexico City | 100m freestyle S10 |
| Gold medal – first place | 2017 Mexico City | 100m butterfly S10 |
| Silver medal – second place | 2017 Mexico City | 50m freestyle S10 |
| Silver medal – second place | 2019 London | 100m butterfly S10 |
| Silver medal – second place | 2023 Manchester | 50m freestyle S10 |
| Silver medal – second place | 2025 Singapore | 50m freestyle S10 |
European Championships
| Bronze medal – third place | 2018 Dublin | 50m freestyle S10 |
| Bronze medal – third place | 2018 Dublin | 100m butterfly S10 |
Mediterranean Games
| Silver medal – second place | 2018 Tarragona | 100m freestyle S10 |

Alessia Scortechini (born 11 February 1997) is an Italian Paralympic swimmer who competes in international level events. She is a double World champion and a double European bronze medalist. She competed at the 2020 Summer Paralympics, in Women's 50m Freestyle-S10.

== Biography ==
She is born with a shortened forearm and has limited strength in her wrist. She competed at the 2017 World Para Swimming Championships, and 2019 World Para Swimming Championships.

== See also ==
- Italy at the 2020 Summer Paralympics
