= Mariia Pavlova =

Russian Paralympic swimmer (born 1998)

Personal information
- Nationality: Russian
- Born: 24 October 1998 (age 27) Moscow, Russia
- Height: 177 cm (5 ft 10 in)

Sport
- Sport: Paralympic swimming
- Disability: Cerebral palsy
- Disability class: S8, SM8, SB7
- Coached by: Natalia Stepanova
Medal record
Representing Neutral Paralympic Athletes
Paralympic Games
Gold medal – first place	2024 Paris	100 m breaststroke SB7
World Championships
Gold medal – first place	2025 Singapore	100 m breaststroke SB7
European Championships
Silver medal – second place	2024 Funchal	100 m breaststroke SB7
Bronze medal – third place	2024 Funchal	400 m freestyle S8
Bronze medal – third place	2024 Funchal	200 m ind. medley SM8
Representing RPC
Paralympic Games
Gold medal – first place	2020 Tokyo	100 m breaststroke SB7
Bronze medal – third place	2020 Tokyo	200 m ind. medley SM8
Representing Russia
World Championships
Bronze medal – third place	2019 London	100 m breaststroke SB7
European Championships
Bronze medal – third place	2016 Funchal	100 m freestyle S8
Bronze medal – third place	2020 Funchal	50 m freestyle S8
Bronze medal – third place	2026 Kocaeli	400 m freestyle S8

Mariia Pavlova (Russian: Мария Павлова, born 24 October 1998) is a Russian Paralympic swimmer. She represented Russian Paralympic Committee athletes at the 2020 Summer Paralympics.

== Career ==
Mariia Pavlova took up swimming aged six, in Moscow. She represented Russian Paralympic Committee athletes at the 2020 Summer Paralympics in the women's 200 metre individual medley SM8 event and won a bronze medal.
