= Emeline Pierre =

French Paralympic swimmer

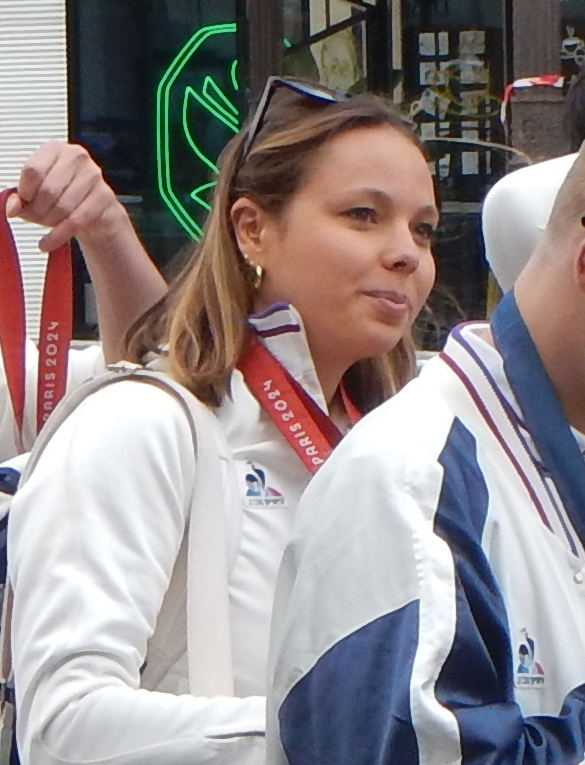

Personal information
- Born: 4 December 1999 (age 26) Pau, Pyrénées-Atlantiques, France

Sport
- Country: France
- Sport: Paralympic swimming
- Disability class: S10
- Event(s): Freestyle swimming Backstroke; Individual medley
- Club: Dauphins Section Paloise
Medal record
Paralympic swimming
Representing France
Paralympic Games
| Gold medal – first place | 2024 Paris | 100 m freestyle S10 |
| Bronze medal – third place | 2024 Paris | 100 m backstroke S10 |
World Championships
| Bronze medal – third place | 2017 Mexico City | 100 m backstroke S10 |
| Bronze medal – third place | 2023 Manchester | 50 m freestyle S10 |
| Bronze medal – third place | 2025 Singapore | 100 m freestyle S10 |
| Bronze medal – third place | 2025 Singapore | Mixed 4×100 m freestyle relay 34 pts |
European Championships
| Bronze medal – third place | 2020 Funchal | 50 m freestyle S10 |
| Bronze medal – third place | 2020 Funchal | 100 m backstroke S10 |

Emeline Pierre (born 4 December 1999) is a French Paralympic swimmer who competes at international swimming competitions. She is a World bronze medalist and a double European bronze medalist.

== Career ==
In 2014, Pierre fell badly from a balance beam at a gymnastics competition and dislocated her right elbow. She had several operations to regain movement on her right arm but it was unsuccessful and it caused permanent damage to her arm.
