= Nora Meister =

Swiss Paralympic swimmer (born 2003)

Personal information
- Born: 6 January 2003 (age 23) Lenzburg, Switzerland

Sport
- Country: Switzerland
- Sport: Paralympic swimming
- Disability: Arthrogryposis
- Disability class: S6
- Club: Schwimmclub Aarefish, Aarau
Medal record
Paralympic swimming
Representing Switzerland
Paralympic Games
Silver medal – second place	2024 Paris	400 m freestyle S6
Bronze medal – third place	2020 Tokyo	400 m freestyle S6
World Championships
Silver medal – second place	2025 Singapore	100 m backstroke S6
Silver medal – second place	2025 Singapore	400 m freestyle S6
Bronze medal – third place	2019 London	100m freestyle S7
Bronze medal – third place	2019 London	400m freestyle S7
Bronze medal – third place	2022 Madeira	100m backstroke S6
Bronze medal – third place	2022 Madeira	400m freestyle S6
Bronze medal – third place	2023 Manchester	100m freestyle S6
Bronze medal – third place	2023 Manchester	400m freestyle S6
Bronze medal – third place	2025 Singapore	100 m freestyle S6
European Championships
Gold medal – first place	2018 Dublin	100m backstroke S7
Gold medal – first place	2018 Dublin	400m freestyle S7
Gold medal – first place	2020 Funchal	400m freestyle S6
Gold medal – first place	2020 Funchal	100m backstroke S6
Gold medal – first place	2026 Kocaeli	100m backstroke S6
Gold medal – first place	[2026 Kocaeli	400m freestyle S6
Silver medal – second place	2018 Dublin	100m freestyle S7
Silver medal – second place	2020 Funchal	100m freestyle S6
Silver medal – second place	2026 Kocaeli	100m freestyle S6

Nora Meister (born 6 January 2003) is a Swiss Paralympic swimmer who competes in international elite events in freestyle and backstroke swimming.

== Career ==
She competed at the 2019 World Para Swimming Championships and won bronze medals in the 100 metre freestyle S7 and 400 metre freestyle S7 events. She competed at the 2022 World Para Swimming Championships and won bronze medals in the 100 metre backstroke S6 and 400 metre freestyle S6 events. She competed at the 2023 World Para Swimming Championships and won a bronze medal in the 100 metre freestyle S6 event.
