= Liesette Bruinsma =

Dutch Paralympic swimmer

Personal information
- Nationality: Dutch
- Born: 9 September 2000 (age 26) Wommels

Sport
- Disability class: S11,
- Club: HZ&PC Heerenveen
- Coached by: Casper Hut (club); Mark Faber (national)
Medal record
Women's para swimming
Representing Netherlands
Paralympic Games
Gold medal – first place	2016 Rio de Janeiro	200 m medley S11
Gold medal – first place	2016 Rio de Janeiro	400 m freestyle S11
Gold medal – first place	2024 Paris	400 m freestyle S11
Silver medal – second place	2016 Rio de Janeiro	100 m breaststroke S11
Silver medal – second place	2020 Tokyo	400 m freestyle S11
Silver medal – second place	2024 Paris	100 m freestyle S11
Bronze medal – third place	2016 Rio de Janeiro	50 m freestyle S11
Bronze medal – third place	2016 Rio de Janeiro	100 m freestyle S11
World Championships
Gold medal – first place	2023 Manchester	100 m freestyle S11
Gold medal – first place	2023 Manchester	400 m freestyle S11
Gold medal – first place	2025 Singapore	100 m freestyle S11
Silver medal – second place	2022 Madeira	50 m freestyle S11
Silver medal – second place	2022 Madeira	100 m freestyle S11
Silver medal – second place	2023 Manchester	50 m freestyle S11
Silver medal – second place	2025 Singapore	400 m freestyle S11
Bronze medal – third place	2022 Madeira	400 m freestyle S11
Bronze medal – third place	2023 Manchester	200 m medley SM11
Bronze medal – third place	2025 Singapore	50 m freestyle S11
Bronze medal – third place	2025 Singapore	200 m medley SM11
European Championships
Gold medal – first place	2016 Funchal	400 m freestyle S11
Gold medal – first place	2016 Funchal	100 m breaststroke SB11
Gold medal – first place	2016 Funchal	200 m find. medley SM11
Gold medal – first place	2018 Dublin	100 m freestyle S11
Gold medal – first place	2018 Dublin	400 m freestyle S11
Gold medal – first place	2018 Dublin	100 m breaststroke S11
Gold medal – first place	2018 Dublin	200 m medley S11
Gold medal – first place	2026 Kocaeli	50 m freestyle S11
Gold medal – first place	2026 Kocaeli	200 m medley SM11
Silver medal – second place	2016 Funchal	50 m freestyle S11
Silver medal – second place	2018 Dublin	50 m freestyle S11
Bronze medal – third place	2016 Funchal	100 m freestyle S11

Liesette Bruinsma (born 9 September 2000) is a Dutch Paralympic swimmer. She competes in S11 classification events for athletes with visual impairments. She is the 2016 double Paralympic champion within her classification. She competed at the 2020 Summer Paralympics, in Women's 400 metre freestyle S11, and Women's 100 metre freestyle S11, winning two silver medals.

== Swimming career ==
Bruinsma first competed for the Netherlands at Glasgow in 2014. Her first major international competition was the 2016 IPC Swimming European Championships in Funchal, where she competed in six events, and took a medal in five of them. Three of her Funchal medal's were gold: 400 m freestyle (S11), 100 m breaststroke (SB11) and the 200 m find. medley (SM11).

In the same year, Bruinsma made her Paralympic Games debut, winning five medals including two golds in the 200 metres individual medley and the 400 metres freestyle.

The Netherlands did not send a team to the 2017 World Para Swimming Championships in Mexico city, but Bruinsma dominated at the 2018 World Para Swimming European Championships, winning four gold medals and breaking two world records, taking her tally of European Championships titles to seven.

During the 2020 Summer Paralympics, Bruinsma raised a protest after the women's 50 free final, claiming to have been hindered by the Chinese Li Guizhi. The Paralympics organizing committee accepted the protest and decided to cancel the competition and hold a re-swim. This decision led to anger and protest in Chinese social media. The competition was repeated on 29 August 2021, with the same two Chinese swimmers winning the gold and silver again and Bruinsma finishing fourth.
