= Maryna Piddubna =

Ukrainian Paralympic swimmer

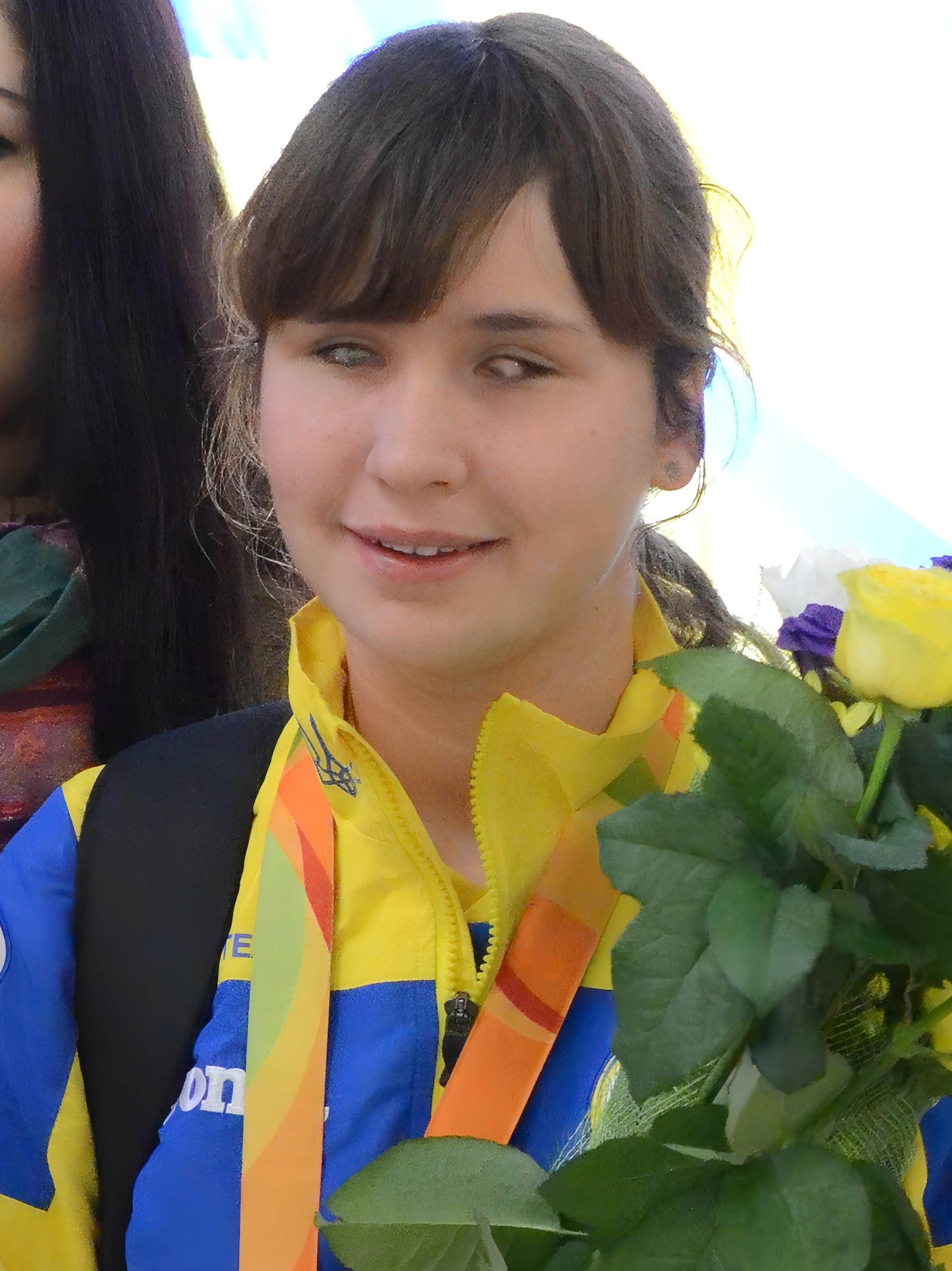

Personal information
- Nationality: Ukrainian
- Born: 7 May 1998 (age 28)

Sport
- Sport: Paralympic swimming
Medal record
Women's para swimming
Representing Ukraine
Paralympic Games
Gold medal – first place	2024 Paris	Mixed 4×100 m freestyle relay 49pts
Bronze medal – third place	2016 Rio de Janeiro	50 metre freestyle S11
Bronze medal – third place	2020 Tokyo	Mixed 4×100 m freestyle relay 49pts
Bronze medal – third place	2024 Paris	50 m freestyle S11
World Para Swimming Championships
Gold medal – first place	2019 London	50m freestyle S11 event
Silver medal – second place	2019 London	100 metre freestyle S11
Silver medal – second place	2019 London	200 metre individual medley SM11
Bronze medal – third place	2013 Montreal	100 metre backstroke
Bronze medal – third place	2015 Glasgow	100 metre backstroke
Bronze medal – third place	2019 London	100 metre backstroke S11
World Para Swimming European Championships
Gold medal – first place	2018 Dublin	50 metre freestyle S11
Silver medal – second place	2018 Dublin	100 metre freestyle S11
Silver medal – second place	2018 Dublin	200 metre individual medley
Silver medal – second place	2024 Madeira	100 metre backstroke S11
Bronze medal – third place	2014 Eindhoven	100 metre backstroke
Bronze medal – third place	2018 Dublin	100 metre backstroke S11
Bronze medal – third place	2024 Madeira	100 metre freestyle S11

Maryna Piddubna (born 7 May 1998) is a Ukrainian Paralympic swimmer.

== Career ==
Piddubna has a visual impairment and competes in S11-class races.

She competed at the 2012 Paralympic Games and won a bronze medal at the 2016 Paralympic Games in the 50 metre freestyle S11 event. Liesette Bruinsma from the Netherlands also won a bronze medal in the race as they both finished in 31.23 seconds.

She won bronze medals at the World Para Swimming Championships in 2013 and 2015 both of which were in the 100 metre backstroke S11 event. She competed again in 2019 where she won a gold medal in the 50m freestyle S11 event, silver medals in the 100 metre freestyle S11 and 200 metre individual medley SM11 events and a bronze medal in the 100 metre backstroke S11 event.

She also competed at the World Para Swimming European Championships in 2014, where she won a bronze medal in the 100 metre backstroke S11 event and in 2018 where she won a gold medal and broke the world record in the 50 metre freestyle S11, won silver medals in the 100 metre freestyle S11 and 200 metre individual medley events and won a bronze medal in the 100 metre backstroke S11 event.

She was awarded with the Order of Princess Olga, third class, for her performance at the 2016 Paralympic Games.
