= Meri-Maari Mäkinen =

Finnish Paralympic swimmer

Personal information
- Born: 26 February 1992 (age 34) Vantaa, Finland
- Height: 1.60 m (5 ft 3 in)

Sport
- Country: Finland
- Sport: Paralympic swimming
- Disability: Hemiplegia
- Disability class: S7, SM7
Medal record
Paralympic swimming
Representing Finland
World Championships
Gold medal – first place	2017 Mexico City	Women's 200m individual medley SM7
European Championships
Silver medal – second place	2016 Funchal	Women's 200m individual medley SM7

Meri-Maari Mäkinen (born 26 February 1992) is a Finnish Paralympic swimmer who competes in the individual medley at international level events. She is a World champion and a European silver-medalist and has competed at the 2012 and 2016 Summer Paralympics.
