= Alessia Berra =

Italian Paralympic swimmer

Personal information
- Born: 17 January 1994 (age 32) Monza, Italy
Medal record
Women's para swimming
Representing Italy
Paralympic Games
Silver medal – second place	2020 Tokyo	100 m butterfly S13
World Championships
Bronze medal – third place	2023 Manchester	50 m freestyle S12
Bronze medal – third place	2025 Singapore	100 m butterfly S12

Alessia Berra (born 17 January 1994) is an Italian Paralympic swimmer. She won a silver medal in the 100 metre butterfly S13 event at the 2020 Summer Paralympics.

== Life ==
She studied at University of Milan. She initially took part in able bodied swimming competitions before switching to Para swimming in 2015.

== Career ==
She competed at the 2015 IPC Swimming World Championships.

She made her Paralympic debut representing Italy at the 2016 Summer Paralympics.
