= 2018 World Para Swimming European Championships =

2018 swimming competition

World Para Swimming European Championships 2018
- Host city: Dublin, Ireland
- Date: 13–19 August 2018
- Venue: National Aquatic Centre
- Nations: 40
- Athletes: 500

The 2018 World Para Swimming European Championships, known for sponsorship reasons as the 2018 World Para Swimming Allianz European Championships took place in Dublin, Ireland from 13 to 19 August 2018. It was the fifth edition of the Championships, the first under the new World Para Swimming branding, and the first time Ireland had hosted. Ukraine topped the medal table for the fourth time in a row.

Formerly the IPC Swimming European Championships, this was the first edition of the championships since IPC undertook a rebrand of all sports for which they are the governing body, including the 'World Para' title for the committees running each sport. IPC Swimming was rebranded World Para Swimming in 2016; its first World Para Swimming Championships were held in 2017, and the European Championships followed suit in 2018.

== Summary ==
25 Athletes won three gold medals or more at the event, while the ten listed below won 4 golds or more. Ihar Boki of Belarus, with seven gold medals, was the most successful swimmer at the event, with Yelyzaveta Mereshko of Ukraine the most successful female athlete with 5 gold and 3 silver medals.

The most successful home athlete was Ellen Keane, with one gold and one bronze medal. Her gold medal represented Ireland's first ever gold in the European Para Swimming Championships.

Rank	Athlete	Nation	Gold	Silver	Bronze	Total
1	Ihar Boki	Belarus (BLR)	7	0	0	7
2	Yelyzaveta Mereshko	Ukraine (UKR)	5	3	0	8
3	Iaroslav Denysenko	Ukraine (UKR)	5	2	0	7
4	Maksym Krypak	Ukraine (UKR)	4	3	0	7
5	Antonio Fantin	Italy (ITA)	4	2	0	6
6	Liesette Bruinsma	Netherlands (NED)	4	1	0	5
6	Simone Barlaam	Italy (ITA)	4	1	0	5
8	Federico Morlacchi	Italy (ITA)	4	0	2	6
9	Carlotta Gilli	Italy (ITA)	4	0	1	5
10	Alice Tai	Great Britain (GBR)	4	0	0	4

22 World Records were broken in total across all events, with a further 9 European records also falling. Liesette Bruinsma of the Netherlands broke three world records in the S11 classification, the most of any competitor; women's 100 metres freestyle S11, 400 metres freestyle S11 and 200 metres individual medley S11.

== Final medal table ==
Ukraine topped the medal table in both golds and total medals for the fourth time in a row. Ukraine dominated men's swimming with 22 golds, while Great Britain led the field in women's swimming, with 17 golds. Hosts Ireland finished 16th, with 3 medals including 1 gold.

Rank	Nation	Gold	Silver	Bronze	Total
1	Ukraine (UKR)	33	44	29	106
2	Italy (ITA)	28	23	21	72
3	Great Britain (GBR)	20	18	17	55
4	Netherlands (NED)	16	8	5	29
5	Spain (ESP)	13	16	23	52
6	Belarus (BLR)	10	1	3	14
7	Germany (GER)	8	4	10	22
8	Greece (GRE)	6	2	1	9
9	Poland (POL)	4	5	4	13
10	Israel (ISR)	3	3	6	12
11	France (FRA)	2	4	8	14
12	Switzerland (SUI)	2	3	3	8
13	Hungary (HUN)	2	2	5	9
14	Czech Republic (CZE)	2	2	1	5
15	Turkey (TUR)	1	1	2	4
16	Ireland (IRL)*	1	1	1	3
17	Latvia (LAT)	1	0	1	2
17	Slovenia (SLO)	1	0	1	2
19	Croatia (CRO)	1	0	0	1
20	Sweden (SWE)	0	2	4	6
21	Portugal (POR)	0	2	3	5
22	Austria (AUT)	0	2	2	4
23	Norway (NOR)	0	2	1	3
24	Iceland (ISL)	0	2	0	2
25	Finland (FIN)	0	1	1	2
26	Cyprus (CYP)	0	1	0	1
26	Estonia (EST)	0	1	0	1
28	Denmark (DEN)	0	0	2	2
Totals (28 entries)		154	150	154	458

== See also ==
- 2018 World Para Athletics European Championships, held in Berlin, Germany.
- 2018 European Aquatics Championships, including able-bodied swimming events, held in Glasgow.
