= Swimming at the 2016 Summer Paralympics – Women's 400 metre freestyle S8 =

Event at the 2012 Summer Paralympics

Women's 400 metre freestyle S8 at the XV Paralympic Games
- Venue: Olympic Aquatics Stadium
- Dates: 8 September 2016
- Competitors: 13 from 8 nations
- Winning time: 4:40.33

Medalists
1st place, gold medalist(s)		Lakeisha Patterson	Australia
2nd place, silver medalist(s)		Jessica Long	United States
3rd place, bronze medalist(s)		Stephanie Millward	Great Britain

The women's 400 metre freestyle S8 event at the 2016 Paralympic Games took place on 8 September 2016, at the Olympic Aquatics Stadium. Two heats were held, the first with six swimmers and the second with seven swimmers. The swimmers with the eight fastest times advanced to the final, which was won by Australia's Lakeisha Patterson, in a world record time of 4:40.33.

== Records ==
Prior to the competition, the existing World and Paralympic records were as follows.

World record	Jessica Long (USA)	4:40.44	Toronto, Canada	20 March 2015
Paralympic record	Jessica Long (USA)	4:42.28	London, Great Britain	31 August 2012
2016 World leading	Lakeisha Patterson (AUS)	4:45.06	Adelaide, Australia	9 April 2016

== Heats ==
=== Heat 1 ===
10:01 8 September 2016

Rank	Lane	Name	Nationality	Time	Notes
1	4	Lakeisha Patterson	Australia	4:57.37	Q
2	5	Maddison Elliott	Australia	5:09.85	Q
3	3	Brickelle Bro	United States	5:16.02	Q
4	2	Vendula Duskova	Czech Republic	5:20.20	Q
5	7	Cecilia Jeronimo de Araujo	Brazil	5:26.27	
6	6	Mallory Weggemann	United States	5:36.21	

=== Heat 2 ===
10:09 8 September 2016

Rank	Lane	Name	Nationality	Time	Notes
1	4	Jessica Long	United States	4:48.26	Q
2	5	Stephanie Millward	Great Britain	4:59.95	Q
3	3	Amalie Vinther	Denmark	5:13.99	Q
4	7	Abi Tripp	Canada	5:21.09	Q
5	2	Sabrina Duchesne	Canada	5:24.51	
6	6	Morgan Bird	Canada	5:25.08	
7	1	Ailbhe Kelly	Ireland	5:41.36	

== Final ==
17:54 8 September 2016

Rank	Lane	Name	Nationality	Time	Notes
1st place, gold medalist(s)	5	Lakeisha Patterson	Australia	4:40.33	WR PR
2nd place, silver medalist(s)	4	Jessica Long	United States	4:47.82	
3rd place, bronze medalist(s)	3	Stephanie Millward	Great Britain	4:49.49	
4	6	Maddison Elliott	Australia	5:02.13	
5	2	Amalie Vinther	Denmark	5:12.01	
6	8	Abi Tripp	Canada	5:16.25	
7	7	Brickelle Bro	United States	5:16.38	
8	1	Vendula Duskova	Canada	5:20.31	
