= Swimming at the 2016 Summer Paralympics – Women's 100 metre backstroke S8 =

Women's 100 metre backstroke S8 at the XV Paralympic Games
- Venue: Olympic Aquatics Stadium
- Dates: 13 September 2016
- Competitors: 18 from 10 nations

Medalists
1st place, gold medalist(s)		Stephanie Millward	Great Britain
2nd place, silver medalist(s)		Maddison Elliott	Australia
3rd place, bronze medalist(s)		Jessica Long	United States

The women's 100 metre backstroke S8 event at the 2016 Paralympic Games took place on 13 September 2016, at the Olympic Aquatics Stadium. Three heats were held. The swimmers with the eight fastest times advanced to the final.

== Heats ==
=== Heat 1 ===
11:12 13 September 2016:

Rank	Lane	Name	Nationality	Time	Notes
1	4	Jessica Long	United States	1:18.92	Q
2	5	Elizabeth Marks	United States	1:19.97	Q
3	3	Cléo Keijzer	Netherlands	1:21.81	Q
4	2	Cecilia Jeronimo de Araujo	Brazil	1:26.63	
5	6	Xiaoqin Jin	China	1:26.65	
6	7	Vendula Dušková	Czech Republic	1:33.49	

=== Heat 2 ===
11:16 13 September 2016:

Rank	Lane	Name	Nationality	Time	Notes
1	5	Lakeisha Patterson	Australia	1:20.32	Q
2	4	Maddison Elliott	Australia	1:20.79	Q
3	3	Mallory Weggemann	United States	1:23.08	
4	6	Abi Tripp	Canada	1:24.82	
5	7	Danielle Dorris	Canada	1:29.20	
6	2	Ailbhe Kelly	Ireland	1:29.48	

=== Heat 3 ===
11:20 13 September 2016:

Rank	Lane	Name	Nationality	Time	Notes
1	4	Stephanie Millward	Great Britain	1:13.75	PR Q
2	5	Stephanie Slater	Great Britain	1:20.17	Q
3	3	Weiyuan Lu	China	1:22.47	Q
4	6	Anezka Floriankova	Czech Republic	1:24.99	
5	2	Valentina Muñoz	Chile	1:25.12	
6	7	Sabrina Duchesne	Canada	1:32.63	

== Final ==
19:28 13 September 2016:

Rank	Lane	Name	Nationality	Time	Notes
1st place, gold medalist(s)	4	Stephanie Millward	Great Britain	1:13.02	PR
2nd place, silver medalist(s)	7	Maddison Elliott	Australia	1:17.16	
3rd place, bronze medalist(s)	5	Jessica Long	United States	1:18.12	
4	2	Lakeisha Patterson	Australia	1:18.27	
5	6	Stephanie Slater	Great Britain	1:19.42	
6	1	Cleo Keijzer	Netherlands	1:22.09	
7	8	Weiyuan Lu	China	1:22.17	
8	3	Elizabeth Marks	United States	1:22.67	
