= Swimming at the 2016 Summer Paralympics – Women's 200 metre individual medley SM8 =

Event at the 2016 Summer Paralympics

Women's 200 metre individual medley SM8 at the XV Paralympic Games
- Venue: Olympic Aquatics Stadium
- Dates: 17 September 2016
- Competitors: 14 from 8 nations
- Winning time: 2:40.23

Medalists
1st place, gold medalist(s)		Jessica Long	United States
2nd place, silver medalist(s)		Stephanie Millward	Great Britain
3rd place, bronze medalist(s)		Lakeisha Patterson	Australia

The women's 200 metre individual medley SM8 event at the 2016 Paralympic Games took place on 17 September 2016, at the Olympic Aquatics Stadium. Two heats were held. The swimmers with the eight fastest times advanced to the final.

== Heats ==
=== Heat 1 ===
10:03 17 September 2016:

Rank	Lane	Name	Nationality	Time	Notes
1	4	Stephanie Millward	Great Britain	2:45.91	Q
2	3	Maddison Elliott	Australia	2:52.42	Q
3	5	Mallory Weggemann	United States	2:53.04	Q
4	2	Lisa den Braber	Netherlands	3:05.12	
5	7	Morgan Bird	Canada	3:07.03	
6	1	Vendula Duskova	Czech Republic	3:11.00	

=== Heat 2 ===
10:08 17 September 2016:

Rank	Lane	Name	Nationality	Time	Notes
1	4	Jessica Long	United States	2:44.45	Q
2	5	Lakeisha Patterson	Australia	2:50.16	Q
3	3	Shengnan Jiang	China	2:54.81	Q
4	6	Weiyuan Lu	China	2:55.25	Q
5	2	Abi Tripp	Canada	2:57.30	Q
6	7	Amalie Vinther	Denmark	3:08.16	
7	1	Anezka Floriankova	Czech Republic	3:10.09	
8	8	Sabrina Duchesne	Canada	3:17.01	

== Final ==
17:51 17 September 2016:

Rank	Lane	Name	Nationality	Time	Notes
1st place, gold medalist(s)	4	Jessica Long	United States	2:40.23	
2nd place, silver medalist(s)	5	Stephanie Millward	Great Britain	2:43.03	
3rd place, bronze medalist(s)	3	Lakeisha Patterson	Australia	2:45.22	
4	7	Shengnan Jiang	China	2:47.15	
5	2	Mallory Weggemann	United States	2:48.95	
6	6	Maddison Elliott	Australia	2:49.67	
7	1	Weiyuan Lu	China	2:50.96	
8	8	Abi Tripp	Canada	2:55.08	
