= Swimming at the 2016 Summer Paralympics – Women's 50 metre freestyle S8 =

Women's 50 metre freestyle S8 at the XV Paralympic Games
- Venue: Olympic Aquatics Stadium
- Dates: 16 September 2016
- Competitors: 15 from 8 nations

Medalists
1st place, gold medalist(s)		Maddison Elliott	Australia
2nd place, silver medalist(s)		Lakeisha Patterson	Australia
3rd place, bronze medalist(s)		Jiang Shengnan	China

The women's 50 metre freestyle S8 event at the 2016 Paralympic Games took place on 16 September 2016, at the Olympic Aquatics Stadium. Two heats were held, with seven and eight swimmers respectively. The swimmers with the eight fastest times advanced to the final, which was won by Australia's Maddison Elliott.

== Records ==
Prior to the competition, the existing World and Paralympic records were as follows:

World record	Maddison Elliott (AUS)	30.13	Brisbane, Australia	1 April 2014
Paralympic record	Mallory Weggemann (USA)	31.13	London, Great Britain	2 September 2012

Source: "Rio Results Book - Event No. 127" (PDF). Rio 2016.

== Heats ==
=== Heat 1 ===
10:09 16 September 2016

Rank	Lane	Name	Nationality	Time	Notes
1	5	Stephanie Millward	Great Britain	30.82	Q PR
2	2	Jiang Shengnan	China	30.89	Q
3	4	Lakeisha Patterson	Australia	30.97	Q
4	3	Kateryna Istomina	Ukraine	32.06	Q
5	7	Abi Tripp	Canada	32.39	
6	1	Amalie Vinther	Denmark	33.89	
7	8	Sabrina Duchesne	Canada	34.87	

=== Heat 2 ===
10:12 16 September 2016

Rank	Lane	Name	Nationality	Time	Notes
1	4	Maddison Elliott	Australia	30.83	Q
2	5	Stephanie Slater	Great Britain	31.17	Q
3	6	Morgan Bird	Canada	31.49	Q
4	7	Jin Xiaoqin	Canada	31.70	Q
5	3	Jessica Long	United States	32.22	
6	2	Mallory Weggemann	United States	33.09	
7	1	Bro Brickelle	United States	34.93	
8	8	Anezka Floriankova	Czech Republic	36.05	

== Final ==
18:03 11 September 2016

Rank	Lane	Name	Nationality	Time	Notes
1st place, gold medalist(s)	5	Maddison Elliott	Australia	29.73	WR PR
2nd place, silver medalist(s)	6	Lakeisha Patterson	Australia	30.13	
3rd place, bronze medalist(s)	3	Jiang Shengnan	China	30.53	
4	2	Stephanie Slater	Great Britain	30.54	
5	4	Stephanie Millward	Great Britain	30.73	
6	8	Kateryna Istomina	Ukraine	31.05	
7	7	Morgan Bird	Canada	31.29	
8	1	Jin Xiaoqin	China	32.09	
