= Swimming at the 2016 Summer Paralympics – Women's 100 metre freestyle S8 =

Women's 100 metre freestyle S8 at the XV Paralympic Games
- Venue: Olympic Aquatics Stadium
- Dates: 11 September 2016
- Competitors: 14 from 9 nations

Medalists
1st place, gold medalist(s)		Maddison Elliott	Australia
2nd place, silver medalist(s)		Lakeisha Patterson	Australia
3rd place, bronze medalist(s)		Stephanie Millward	Great Britain

The women's 100 metre freestyle S8 event at the 2016 Paralympic Games took place on 11 September 2016, at the Olympic Aquatics Stadium. Two heats were held, with seven swimmers in each. The swimmers with the eight fastest times advanced to the final, which was won by Australia's Maddison Elliott.

== Records ==
Prior to the competition, the existing World and Paralympic records were as follows:

World record	Maddison Elliott (AUS)	1:04:71	Glasgow, Great Britain	2015
Paralympic record	Maddison Elliott (AUS)	1:04:73	Rio de Janeiro, Brazil	2016

== Heats ==
=== Heat 1 ===
11:20 11 September 2016

Rank	Lane	Name	Nationality	Time	Notes
1	4	Jessica Long	United States	1:06.07	Q
2	5	Lakeisha Patterson	Australia	1:07.45	Q
3	2	Abi Tripp	Canada	1:10.30	Q
4	3	Mallory Weggemann	United States	1:11.17	Q
5	6	Amalie Vinther	Denmark	1:11.90	
6	7	Vendula Duskova	Czech Republic	1:15.80	
6	1	Ailbhe Kelly	Ireland	1:20.65	

=== Heat 2 ===
11:23 11 September 2016

Rank	Lane	Name	Nationality	Time	Notes
1	4	Maddison Elliott	Australia	1:07.69	Q
2	5	Stephanie Millward	Great Britain	1:08.24	Q
3	7	Cecilia Jeronimo de Araujo	Brazil	1:09.73	Q
4	6	Morgan Bird	Canada	1:09.92	Q
5	2	Brickelle Bro	United States	1:14.41	
6	1	Sabrina Duchesne	Canada	1:15.41	
7	8	Anezka Floriankova	Czech Republic	1:20.29	

== Final ==
19:36 11 September 2016

Rank	Lane	Name	Nationality	Time	Notes
1st place, gold medalist(s)	3	Maddison Elliott	Australia	1:04.73	PR
2nd place, silver medalist(s)	5	Lakeisha Patterson	Australia	1:05.08	
3rd place, bronze medalist(s)	6	Stephanie Millward	Great Britain	1:05.16	
4	4	Jessica Long	United States	1:05.72	
5	7	Morgan Bird	Canada	1:09.67	
6	2	Cecilia Jeronimo de Araujo	Brazil	1:09.83	
7	1	Abi Tripp	Canada	1:10.40	
8	8	Mallory Weggemann	United States	1.11.80	
