= Swimming at the 2018 Commonwealth Games – Women's 50 metre freestyle S8 =

Women's 50 metre freestyle S8 at the 2018 Commonwealth Games
- Venue: Gold Coast Aquatic Centre
- Dates: 10 April 2018
- Competitors: 7 from 5 nations
- Winning time: 30.14

Medalists
gold medal	Lakeisha Patterson	Australia
silver medal	Morgan Bird	Canada
bronze medal	Abigail Tripp	Canada

The Women's 50 metre freestyle S8 event at the 2018 Commonwealth Games was held on 10 April 2018 at the Gold Coast Aquatic Centre.

== Schedule ==
The schedule is as follows:

All times are Australian Eastern Standard Time (UTC+10)

Date	Time	Round
Tuesday 10 April 2018	6:35	Qualifying
Tuesday 10 April 2018	16:02	Final

== Results ==
=== Heats ===
Rank	Lane	Name	Nationality	Time	Notes
1	4	Lakeisha Patterson	Australia	31.41	Q
2	5	Morgan Bird	Canada	32.27	Q
3	3	Abigail Tripp	Canada	32.54	Q
4	6	Tiffany Thomas Kane	Australia	35.21	Q
5	2	Carmen Lim	Malaysia	35.95	Q
6	7	Vaishnavi Vinod Jagtap	India	41.63	Q
7	1	Ann Wacuka	Kenya	56.63	Q

=== Final ===
Rank	Lane	Name	Nationality	Time	Notes
1st place, gold medalist(s)	4	Lakeisha Patterson	Australia	30.14	
2nd place, silver medalist(s)	5	Morgan Bird	Canada	32.03	
3rd place, bronze medalist(s)	3	Abigail Tripp	Canada	32.49	
4	6	Tiffany Thomas Kane	Australia	35.40	
5	2	Carmen Lim	Malaysia	36.85	
6	7	Vaishnavi Vinod Jagtap	India	42.03	
7	1	Ann Wacuka	Kenya	56.72	
