= Swimming at the 2014 Commonwealth Games – Women's 100 metre freestyle S8 =

Women's 100 metre freestyle S8 at the 2014 Commonwealth Games
- Venue: Tollcross International Swimming Centre
- Dates: 25 July 2014
- Competitors: 6 from 5 nations
- Winning time: 1:05.32 WR

Medalists
gold medal	Maddison Elliott	Australia
silver medal	Stephanie Slater	England
bronze medal	Lakeisha Patterson	Australia

The women's 100 metre freestyle S8 event at the 2014 Commonwealth Games as part of the swimming programme took place on 25 July at the Tollcross International Swimming Centre in Glasgow, Scotland.

The medals were presented by Bruce Robertson, Vice-President of the Commonwealth Games Federation and the quaichs were presented by Forbes Dunlop, Chief Executive Officer of Scottish Swimming.

== Records ==
Prior to this competition, the existing world and Commonwealth Games records were as follows.

World record	Jessica Long (USA)	1:05.63	London, United Kingdom	6 September 2012
Commonwealth record				
Games record	N/A	N/A	N/A	N/A

The following records were established during the competition:

Date	Event	Name	Nationality	Time	Record
25 July	Final	Maddison Elliott	Australia	1:05.32	WR

== Results ==
=== Heats ===
Rank	Heat	Lane	Name	Nationality	Time	Notes
1	1	4	Maddison Elliott	Australia	1:06.45	Q
2	1	5	Stephanie Slater	England	1:07.38	Q
3	1	7	Lakeisha Patterson	Australia	1:10.54	Q
4	1	3	Morgan Bird	Canada	1:10.65	Q
5	1	6	Nikita Howarth	New Zealand	1:21.50	Q
6	1	2	Ann Wacuka	Kenya	2:17.11	Q

=== Final ===
Rank	Lane	Name	Nationality	Time	Notes
1st place, gold medalist(s)	4	Maddison Elliott	Australia	1:05.32	WR
2nd place, silver medalist(s)	5	Stephanie Slater	England	1:05.73	
3rd place, bronze medalist(s)	3	Lakeisha Patterson	Australia	1:08.98	
4	6	Morgan Bird	Canada	1:10.07	
5	2	Nikita Howarth	New Zealand	1:19.36	
6	7	Ann Wacuka	Kenya	2:04.03	
