= Swimming at the 2016 Summer Paralympics – Women's 4 × 100 metre medley relay 34pts =

Women's 4 × 100 metre medley relay - 34 points at the XV Paralympic Games
- Venue: Olympic Aquatics Stadium
- Dates: 16 September 2016
- Competitors: from 7 nations

Medalists
1st place, gold medalist(s)		Great Britain (GBR)
2nd place, silver medalist(s)		Australia (AUS)
3rd place, bronze medalist(s)		United States (USA)

The women's 4 × 100 metre medley relay - 34 points swimming events for the 2016 Summer Paralympics took place at the Rio Olympic Stadium on 16 September 2016.

== Competition format ==
Relay teams are based on a point score. The sport class of an individual swimmer is worth the actual number value i.e. sport class S6 is worth six points, sport class SB12 is worth twelve points, and so on. The total of all the competitors must add up to 34 points or less.

== Records ==
Prior to the competition, the World record was as follows:

World record	Great Britain	4:46.21	Montreal, Canada	18 August 2015
Paralympic record	Australia	4:53.95	London, Great Britain	7 September 2012

== Final ==
20:43 16 September 2016:

Rank	Lane	Name	Nationality	Time	Notes
1st place, gold medalist(s)	4	Alice Tai (S10); Claire Cashmore (SB8); Stephanie Slater (S8); Stephanie Millward (S8)	Great Britain	4:45.23	WR
2nd place, silver medalist(s)	5	Ellie Cole (S9); Madeleine Scott (SB9); Maddison Elliott (S8); Lakeisha Patterson (S8)	Australia	4:45.85	
3rd place, bronze medalist(s)	3	Hannah Aspden (S9); Elizabeth Marks (SB7); Elizabeth Smith (S8); Michelle Konkoly (S9)	United States	4:50.34	
4	6	Lingling Song (S6); Meng Zhang (SB9); Jialing Xu (S7); Yi Chen (S10)	China	4:53.57	
5	2	Aurelie Rivard (S10); Katarina Roxon (SB8); Danielle Dorris (S8); Morgan Bird (S8)	Canada	5:01.13	
6	7	Lisa Kruger (S10); Lisa den Braber (SB7); Cleo Keijzer (S8); Manon Vermarion (S9)	Netherlands	5:13.32	
7	1	Ari Ike (S10); Mei Ichnose (SB9); Yuki Morishita (S9); Mayumi Narita (S5)	Japan	5:21.68	
