= Romy Pansters =

Dutch swimmer (born 1996)

Personal information
- Born: 22 April 1996 (age 30) Nuth, Netherlands
- Height: 1.65 m (5 ft 5 in)

Sport
- Country: Netherlands
- Sport: Paralympic swimming Paratriathlon
- Disability: Paraplegia
- Disability class: S8
Medal record
Paralympic swimming
Representing Netherlands
European Championships
Silver medal – second place	2014 Eindhoven	Women's 400m freestyle S8
Bronze medal – third place	2014 Eindhoven	Women's 100m freestyle S8

Romy Pansters (born 22 April 1996) is a Dutch paratriathlete and former Paralympic swimmer who competes at international level events, she was also a tennis player and handballer at national youth level before suffering from a blood clot in her spinal cord which led to paraplegia in June 2006 and has used a wheelchair since however is learning to walk again through rehabilitation. During her swimming career, she has won two European swimming medals and was a finalist in the women's 400m freestyle S8 where she finished last place as well as swimming at the 50m freestyle S8 and 100m freestyle S8.

Pansters switched sports and turned to paratriathlon in 2015, she competed in the ETU Paratriathlon Championships but did not finish after she crashed her bike during the race in Lisbon.
