= Swimming at the 2012 Summer Paralympics – Women's 400 metre freestyle S8 =

Event at the 2012 Summer Paralympics

Women's 400m Freestyle S8 at the XIV Paralympic Games
- Venue: London Aquatics Centre
- Dates: 31 August
- Competitors: 14 from 7 nations
- Winning time: 4:42.28

Medalists
1st place, gold medalist(s)		Jessica Long	United States
2nd place, silver medalist(s)		Heather Frederiksen	Great Britain
3rd place, bronze medalist(s)		Maddison Elliott	Australia

The women's 400m freestyle S8 event at the 2012 Summer Paralympics took place at the London Aquatics Centre on 31 August. There were two heats; the swimmers with the eight fastest times advanced to the final.

== Results ==
=== Heats ===
Competed from 09:45.

==== Heat 1 ====
Rank	Lane	Name	Nationality	Time	Notes
1	4	Heather Frederiksen	Great Britain	4:58.29	Q
2	2	Maddison Elliott	Australia	5:13.34	Q
3	3	McKenzie Coan	United States	5:17.94	Q
4	6	Amalie Vinther	Denmark	5:28.03	
5	1	Camille Bérubé	Canada	5:39.14	
6	7	Charlotte Henshaw	Great Britain	5:42.19	
7	5	Emma Hollis	Great Britain	6:02.84	

==== Heat 2 ====
Rank	Lane	Name	Nationality	Time	Notes
1	4	Jessica Long	United States	4:44.52	Q, PR
2	3	Morgan Bird	Canada	5:19.15	Q
3	6	Julia Kabus	Germany	5:19.20	Q
4	2	Romy Pansters	Netherlands	5:19.80	Q
5	5	Brickelle Bro	United States	5:27.15	Q
6	7	Lisa den Braber	Netherlands	5:34.18	
7	1	Sarah Mailhot	Canada	5:54.67	

=== Final ===
Competed at 17:41.

Rank	Lane	Name	Nationality	Time	Notes
1st place, gold medalist(s)	4	Jessica Long	United States	4:42.28	WR
2nd place, silver medalist(s)	5	Heather Frederiksen	Great Britain	5:00.50	
3rd place, bronze medalist(s)	3	Maddison Elliott	Australia	5:09.36	
4	2	Morgan Bird	Canada	5:18.35	
5	8	Brickelle Bro	United States	5:20.42	
6	6	McKenzie Coan	United States	5:20.57	
7	7	Julia Kabus	Germany	5:21.46	
8	1	Romy Pansters	Netherlands	5:30.71	

'Q = qualified for final. WR = World Record. PR = Paralympic Record.
