= Abi Tripp =

Canadian Paralympic swimmer (born 2001)

Personal information
- Full name: Abigail Diane Tripp
- Born: 6 January 2001 (age 25) Kingston, Ontario, Canada
- Height: 163 cm (5 ft 4 in)

Sport
- Country: Canada
- Sport: Paralympic swimming
- Disability: Cerebral palsy
- Disability class: S8, SB8, SM8
- Club: Kingston Penguins Aquatic Club
- Coached by: Vicki Keith
Medal record
Paralympic swimming
Representing Canada
World Championships
Silver medal – second place	2023 Manchester	100 m breaststroke SB7
Bronze medal – third place	2019 London	Mixed 4x100m freestyle relay
Commonwealth Games
Bronze medal – third place	2018 Gold Coast	Women's 50m freestyle S8

Abigail "Abi" Tripp (born January 6, 2001) is a Canadian Paralympic swimmer. She has won bronze medals at the Commonwealth Games and the World Para Swimming Championships, and won silver at the 2023 World Para Swimming Championships. She has represented Canada at the 2016 and 2020 Summer Paralympics, and will compete in swimming at the 2024 Paralympic Games.

== Early life and education ==
Tripp was born in Kingston, Ontario nine and a half weeks early to parents Steve and Helen Tripp on January 6, 2001. She has an older brother, Ben. At age two, she was diagnosed with cerebral palsy.

In 2006, Tripp competed in a Kids of Steel triathlon; while competing, she caught the attention of Vicki Keith, who later approached Tripp's mother about joining the Kingston Y Penguins swim team program for children with disabilities. At six-years old, Tripp joined the Kingston Y Penguins swim team.

Tripp attended Rideau Public School and then Regiopolis-Notre Dame Catholic High School. At age 17, she was diagnosed with dystonia. Tripp studied psychology at Université Laval.

== Career ==
Tripp competed in the 50-metre and 100-metre freestyle, 100-metre breaststroke and 200-metre individual medley at the 2015 Parapan American Games, her major Games debut. She placed fourth in all four events. At the 2016 national competition, Tripp broke Andrea Cole’s 2002 record of 3:03.04 in the qualification heats for the 200-metre women’s individual medley SM8 with a time of 3:00.98. Racing again in the final, she broke her new record with a time of 2:58.77.

Tripp made her Paralympic debut at the 2016 Paralympic Games, competing in the 50-, 100- and 400-metre freestyle; the 100-metre backstroke; the 100-metre breaststroke; and the 200-metre individual medley. She made finals in three events, placing eighth in the 200-metre individual medley, seventh in the 100-metre freestyle, and sixth in the 400-metre freestyle, setting a new Canadian record.

Tripp won a bronze medal in the 50-metre freestyle at the 2018 Commonwealth Games. Later that year, she placed fourth in the 200m individual medley SM8 and fifth in the 100m backstroke S8 at the Pan Pacific Para Swimming championships. She won bronze in the 4×100-metre freestyle relay at the world championships in 2019, with Katarina Roxon, Aurélie Rivard, and Tess Routliffe. This was Tripp's first medal at a world championship. In 2019, she was named the Kiwanis Athlete of the Year.

Based on her performance in the final at the 2019 world championships, Tripp qualified to compete at the 2020 Summer Paralympic Games. At the Games was disqualified in the SB7 100-m breaststroke and the women’s 4×100-m medley. In the breaststroke, it was determined her kick was not legal, taking into consideration her cerebral palsy and dystonia.

In 2023, Tripp was elected to the Canadian Paralympic Athletes’ Council for a four-year term. She won silver at the 2023 Para Swimming World Championships in the women's 100-metre breaststroke. Tripp was named to represent Canada at the Paris 2024 Paralympic Games.
