= Sabrina Duchesne =

Canadian para swimmer (born 2001)

Personal information
- Born: April 17, 2001 (age 25) St-Augustin-de-Desmaures, Quebec, Canada
- Height: 160 cm (5 ft 3 in)

Sport
- Country: Canada
- Sport: Para swimming
- Strokes: freestyle, backstroke, breaststroke, medley
- Classifications: S7, S8, SB8, SM8
- Club: Club de Natation Rouge et Or
- Coach: Emmanuel Vergé
Medal record
Women's para swimming
Representing Canada
Summer Paralympic Games
Bronze medal – third place	2020 Tokyo	4x100m freestyle 34pts
World Championships
Bronze medal – third place	2023 Manchester	400m freestyle S7
Parapan American Games
Bronze medal – third place	2015 Toronto	400m freestyle S7

Sabrina Duchesne (born April 17, 2001) is a Canadian para swimmer who won a bronze medal in the Women's 34pts 4x100m relay event at the 2020 Summer Paralympics. She competed at the 2016 Summer Paralympics, 2018 Pan Pacific Para Swimming Championships, and 2019 World Para Swimming Championships.

== Early life and education ==
Duchesne is from Saint-Augustin-de-Desmaures, Quebec. She has cerebral palsy and took up swimming as a form of physiotherapy.

Duchesne is pursuing a degree in criminology at Université Laval.

== Career ==
At age 14, Duchesne was the youngest national team member to compete for Canada at the 2015 Para Pan American Games in Toronto. She made it to the final of the 200-metre individual medley and won bronze in the S7 women's 400-metre freestyle.

She made her Paralympic debut at the 2016 Summer Paralympics, competing in five S8 events: the 50-metre, 100-metre, and 400-metre freestyle; the 100-metre backstroke; and the 200-metre individual medley. Her best result was placing sixth in the 400-metre freestyle. In 2017, she fractured her foot, negatively impacting her performance.

The 2020 Summer Paralympics marked Duchesne's debut in the S7 classification. With Morgan Bird, Katarina Roxon, and Aurelie Rivard, she won a bronze medal in the Women's 34pts 4x100m relay. She also finished sixth in the 100-metre freestyle S7 at the games.

At the 2023 World Para Swimming Championships, she won bronze in the women's 400-metre freestyle S7. This was her first Para Worlds medal. Duchesne is set to represent Canada at the 2024 Summer Paralympics.
