= Lakeisha Patterson =

Australian Paralympic swimmer (born 1999)

Lakeisha Patterson OAM
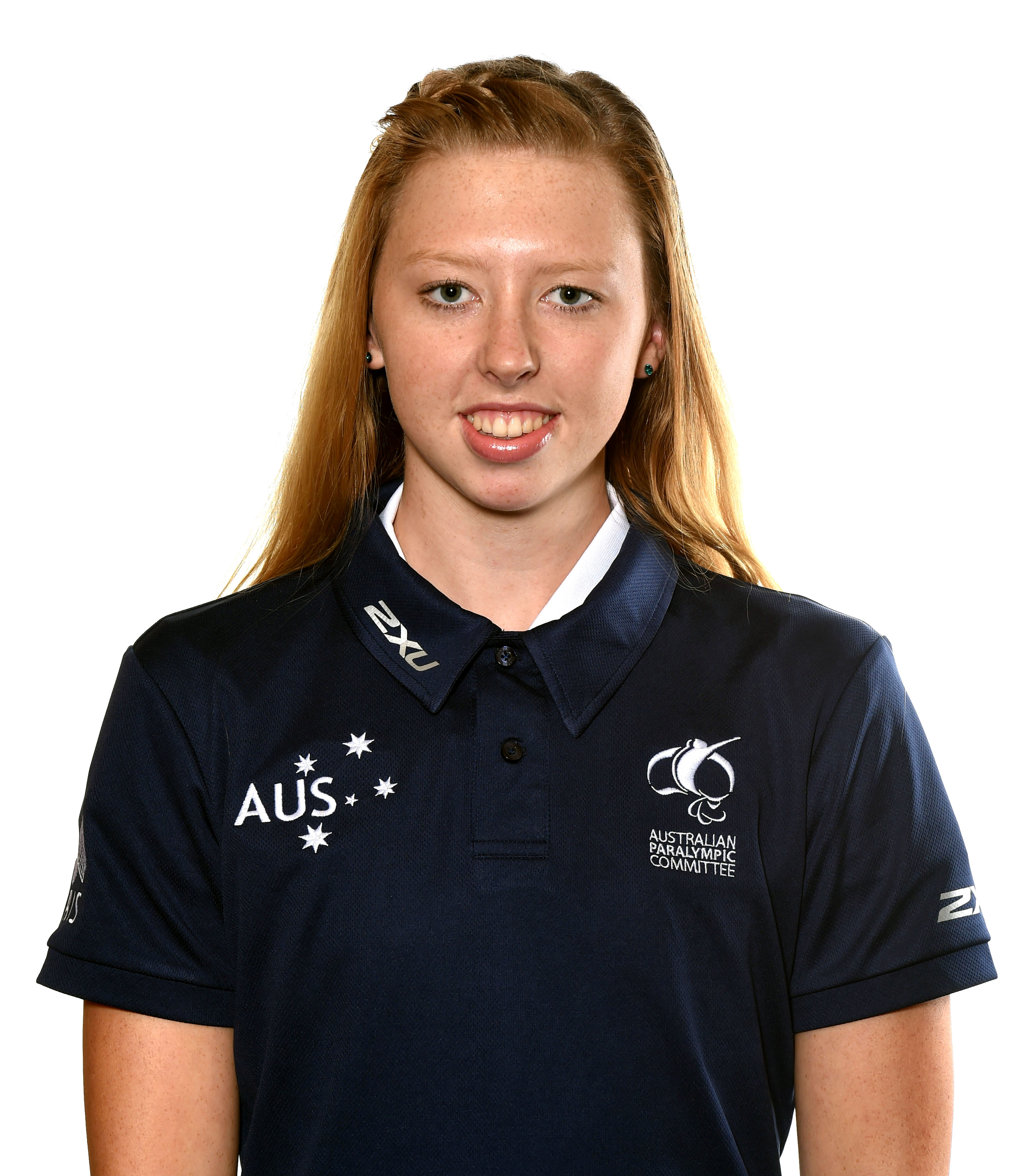
- Patterson in 2016

Personal information
- Full name: Lakeisha Patterson
- Nickname: Lucky
- Nationality: Australian
- Born: 5 January 1999 (age 27) Wodonga, Victoria
- Spouse: William Martin

Sport
- Sport: Swimming
- Classifications: S9
- Club: USC Spartans
- Coach: Casey Atkins
Medal record
Women's paralympic swimming
Representing Australia
Event	1st	2nd	3rd
Paralympic Games	3	3	1
World Championships	4	2	2
Commonwealth Games	3	0	1
Total	10	5	4
Paralympics
Gold medal – first place	2016 Rio de Janeiro	400 m freestyle S8
Gold medal – first place	2016 Rio de Janeiro	4×100 m freestyle
Gold medal – first place	2020 Tokyo	400 m freestyle S9
Silver medal – second place	2016 Rio de Janeiro	50m freestyle S8
Silver medal – second place	2016 Rio de Janeiro	100m freestyle S8
Silver medal – second place	2016 Rio de Janeiro	4×100 m medley
Silver medal – second place	2024 Paris	400 m freestyle S9
Bronze medal – third place	2016 Rio de Janeiro	200m individual medley S8
World Championships
Gold medal – first place	2015 Glasgow	4×100 m freestyle
Gold medal – first place	2019 London	400 m freestyle S9
Gold medal – first place	2023 Manchester	400 m freestyle S9
Gold medal – first place	2025 Singapore	400 m freestyle S9
Silver medal – second place	2015 Glasgow	50 m freestyle S8
Silver medal – second place	2015 Glasgow	4×100 m medley
Bronze medal – third place	2015 Glasgow	100 m freestyle S8
Bronze medal – third place	2015 Glasgow	400 m freestyle S8
Commonwealth Games
Gold medal – first place	2018 Gold Coast	50 m freestyle S8
Gold medal – first place	2018 Gold Coast	100 m freestyle S9
Gold medal – first place	2026 Glasgow	100 m freestyle S9
Bronze medal – third place	2014 Glasgow	100 m freestyle S8

Lakeisha Dawn Patterson, OAM (born 5 January 1999) is an Australian Paralympic swimmer. She has won gold medals at the Commonwealth Games and World Para Swimming Championships. At the 2016 Rio Paralympics, she won Australia's first gold medal of the Games in a world record time swim in the Women's 400m freestyle S8. At the 2020 Tokyo Paralympics, she won the gold medal in the Women's 400 m Freestyle S9. At the 2024 Paris Paralympics, she won the silver medal in the Women's 400 m Freestyle S9.

== Personal ==
Patterson was born on 5 January 1999 in Wodonga, Victoria. She has early onset Parkinson's disease, epilepsy and cerebral palsy left hemiplegia. In 2020, she commenced a Bachelor of Communication (majoring in Digital Media) at University of Queensland.

She lives at Caboolture, Queensland.

== Career ==
Patterson started swimming at the age of three as part of her rehabilitation to overcome muscle stiffness. She is classified as an S9 swimmer. She initially trained under Steve Hadler at Southern Cross Swimming Club, Scarborough and Suellyn Fraser at the Bribie Island Aquatic Leisure Centre.

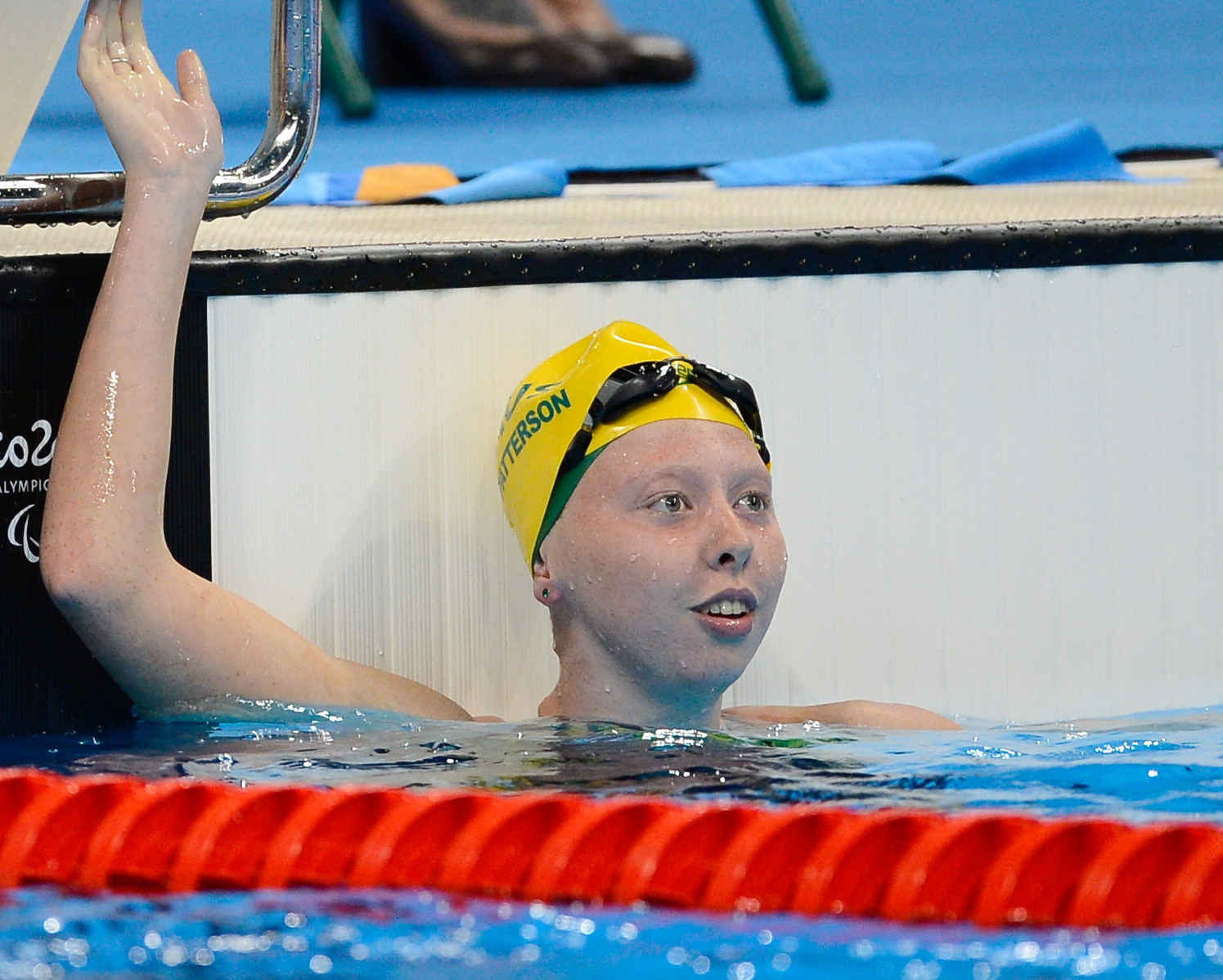
Patterson after winning the 400m freestyle at the Rio Paralympics

At the 2014 Commonwealth Games in Glasgow, Scotland, she won the bronze medal in the Women's 100 m Freestyle S8. Competing at the 2015 IPC Swimming World Championships in Glasgow, she won a gold medal in the Women's 4 × 100 m Freestyle Relay 34 points, silver medals in the Women's 50 m Freestyle S8 and Women's 4 × 100 m Medley Relay 34 points and bronze medals in the Women's 100 m Freestyle S8 and Women's 400 m Freestyle S8. She finished fifth in the Women's 100m Backstroke S8.

In April 2016, she was selected as part of the national team for the 2016 Summer Paralympics in Rio de Janeiro. She won Australia's first gold medal of the Rio Paralympics in winning the Women's 400m Freestyle S8, she set a new World record, Paralympic record, and Oceania record of 4:40:33, slicing 0.11 seconds of the previous world record time set by her long-time idol, American Jessica Long, who came in second. She was a member of the team that won the gold medal in the Women's 4 × 100 m Freestyle Relay 34 points. Three silver medals were won in the Women's 50 m and 100m Freestyle S8 behind Maddison Elliott and the Women's 4 × 100 m Medley Relay 34 points.

In reflection on competing at Rio 2016, Patterson says "If someone told me one year ago that this is where I'd be I would have said, 'no, this is a joke.'" But after winning her first gold medal against Jessica Long, she states "I knew I had to attack and go out hard and keep fighting for it, and I knew she was right behind me, so I just had to keep going forward."

At the 2019 World Para Swimming Championships in London, she won the gold medal in the Women's 400 m Freestyle S9 and did not medal in three other events.

At the 2020 Tokyo Paralympics, in her only event, she won the gold medal in the Women's 400 m Freestyle S9 with a time of 4:36.68. This repeated her success in Rio but this time she was in the S9 class as she was reclassified as an S9 swimmer, a class for less physically impaired swimmers.

At the 2022 Commonwealth Games, Birmingham, England, she finished 5th in the Women's 200 m individual medley SM10. At the 2023 World Para Swimming Championships in Manchester, England, she won the gold medal in the Women's 400 m Freestyle S9.

At the 2024 Paris Paralympics, she won the silver medal in the Women's 400 m Freestyle S9, finished ninth in Women's 100 m Freestyle S9 and seventh in the 200 m individual medley SM9. At the 2025 World Para Swimming Championships in Singapore, she won the gold medal in Women's 400m Freestyle S9.

In 2015, she was coached by Jan Cameron at the University of the Sunshine Coast Paralympic Training Centre. In early 2016, she moved to coach Harley Connolly. In 2024, she is coached by Casey Atkins at USC Spartans.

== Recognition ==
- 2016 – Queensland Athlete with a Disability Award
- 2016 – Sporting Wheelies and Disabled Association Senior Female Athlete of the Year.
- 2017 – Medal of the Order of Australia
- 2017 – Swimming Australia Mrs. Gina Rinehart Patron Award
- 2018 – UniSport Australia - Outstanding Performance by an Athlete with a Disability
- 2019 – Swimming Australia Paralympic Program Swimmer of the Year (joint winner with Tiffany Thomas Kane)
- 2019 – University of Queensland's Sportswoman of the Year
