= Maddison Elliott =

Australian Paralympic swimmer (born 1998)

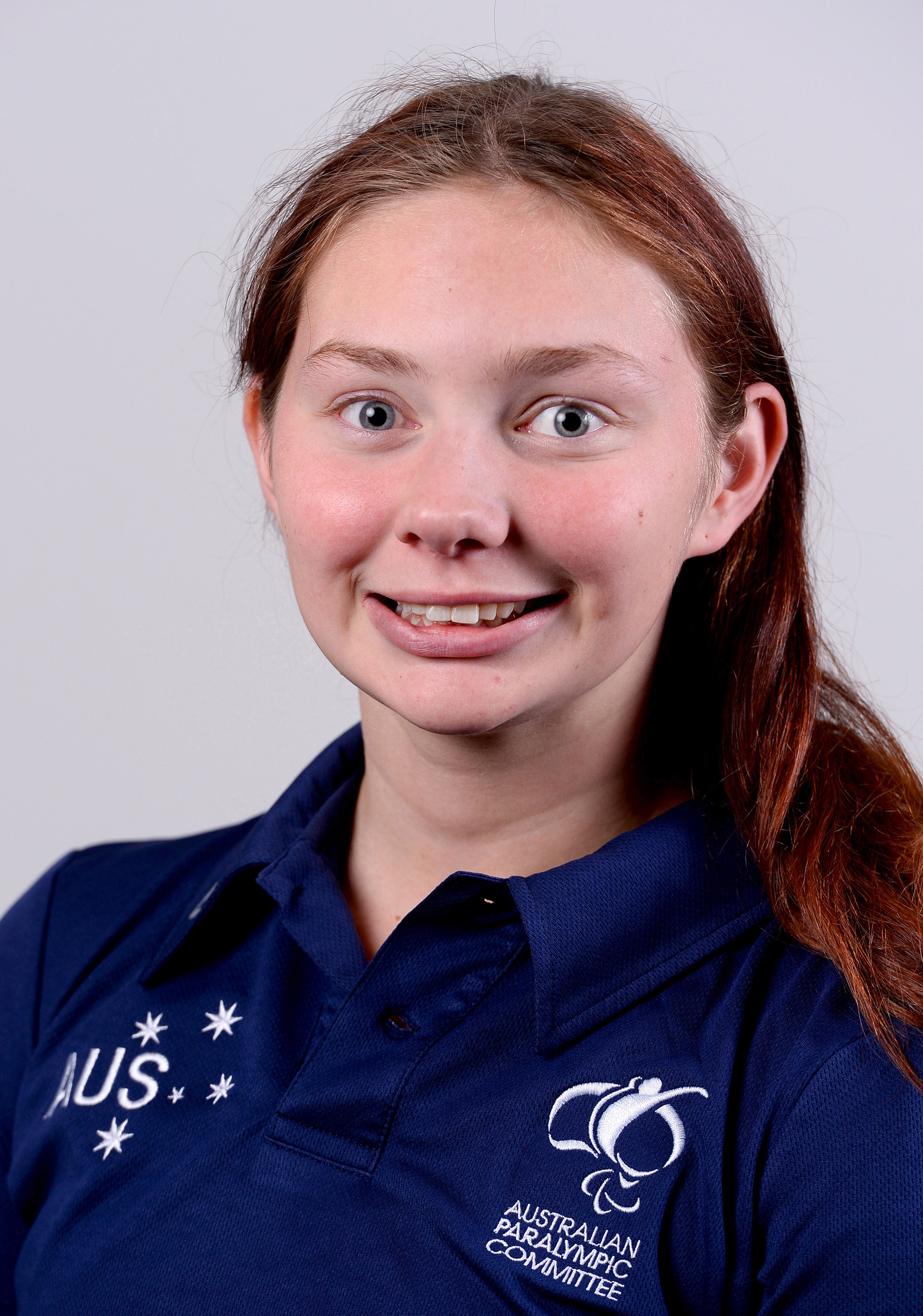
- 2016 Australian Paralympic team portrait of Elliott

Personal information
- Full name: Maddison Gae Elliott
- Nationality: Australia
- Born: 3 November 1998 (age 28) Newcastle, New South Wales, Australia

Sport
- Sport: Swimming
- Strokes: Freestyle
- Classifications: S9
- Club: NU Swim
- Coach: Paul Sharman
Medal record
Women's paralympic swimming
Representing Australia
Paralympic Games
Gold medal – first place	2012 London	4×100 m freestyle
Gold medal – first place	2016 Rio de Janeiro	50 m freestyle S8
Gold medal – first place	2016 Rio de Janeiro	100 m freestyle S8
Gold medal – first place	2016 Rio de Janeiro	4×100 m freestyle
Silver medal – second place	2012 London	50 m freestyle S8
Silver medal – second place	2016 Rio de Janeiro	100 m backstroke S8
Silver medal – second place	2016 Rio de Janeiro	4×100 m medley
Bronze medal – third place	2012 London	100 m freestyle S8
Bronze medal – third place	2012 London	400 m freestyle S8
World Championships (LC)
Gold medal – first place	2013 Montreal	50 m freestyle S8
Gold medal – first place	2013 Montreal	100 m freestyle S8
Gold medal – first place	2015 Glasgow	50m freestyle S8
Gold medal – first place	2015 Glasgow	100m freestyle S8
Gold medal – first place	2015 Glasgow	100m backstroke S8
Gold medal – first place	2015 Glasgow	4 × 100m freestyle relay 34 points
Silver medal – second place	2013 Montreal	400 m freestyle S8
Silver medal – second place	2015 Glasgow	4 × 100m medley relay 34 points
Silver medal – second place	2015 Glasgow	400m freestyle S8
Bronze medal – third place	2015 Glasgow	100m butterfly S8
Commonwealth Games
Gold medal – first place	2014 Glasgow	100 m freestyle S8

Maddison Gae Elliott, OAM (born 3 November 1998) is an Australian swimmer. At the 2012 Summer Paralympics in London, she became the youngest Australian Paralympic medallist by winning bronze medals in the women's 400 m and 100 m freestyle S8 events. She then became the youngest Australian gold medallist when she was a member of the women's 4 × 100 m freestyle relay 34 points team. At the 2016 Rio Paralympics, she won three gold and two silver medals.

== Personal ==
Maddison Gae Elliott was born on 3 November 1998 in Newcastle, New South Wales. She has right side cerebral palsy as a result of a neonatal stroke, and was diagnosed with the condition when she was four years old. In addition to swimming, she participated in athletics, and by 2010 held six Australian age group classification records. In 2016, she was living in Gillieston Heights, New South Wales, and a year 12 student at Bishop Tyrrell Anglican College. She has an older sister, younger sister and younger brother.

== Swimming ==
Elliott was originally an S8 classified swimmer but in 2017 she was reclassified as S9, a classification for athletes with less physical impairment. She is a member of Nuswim Swimming Club, started swimming when she was six months old, and commenced competitive swimming in 2009. She made her national team debut that same year at the Youth Paralympic Games, where she won five gold medals.

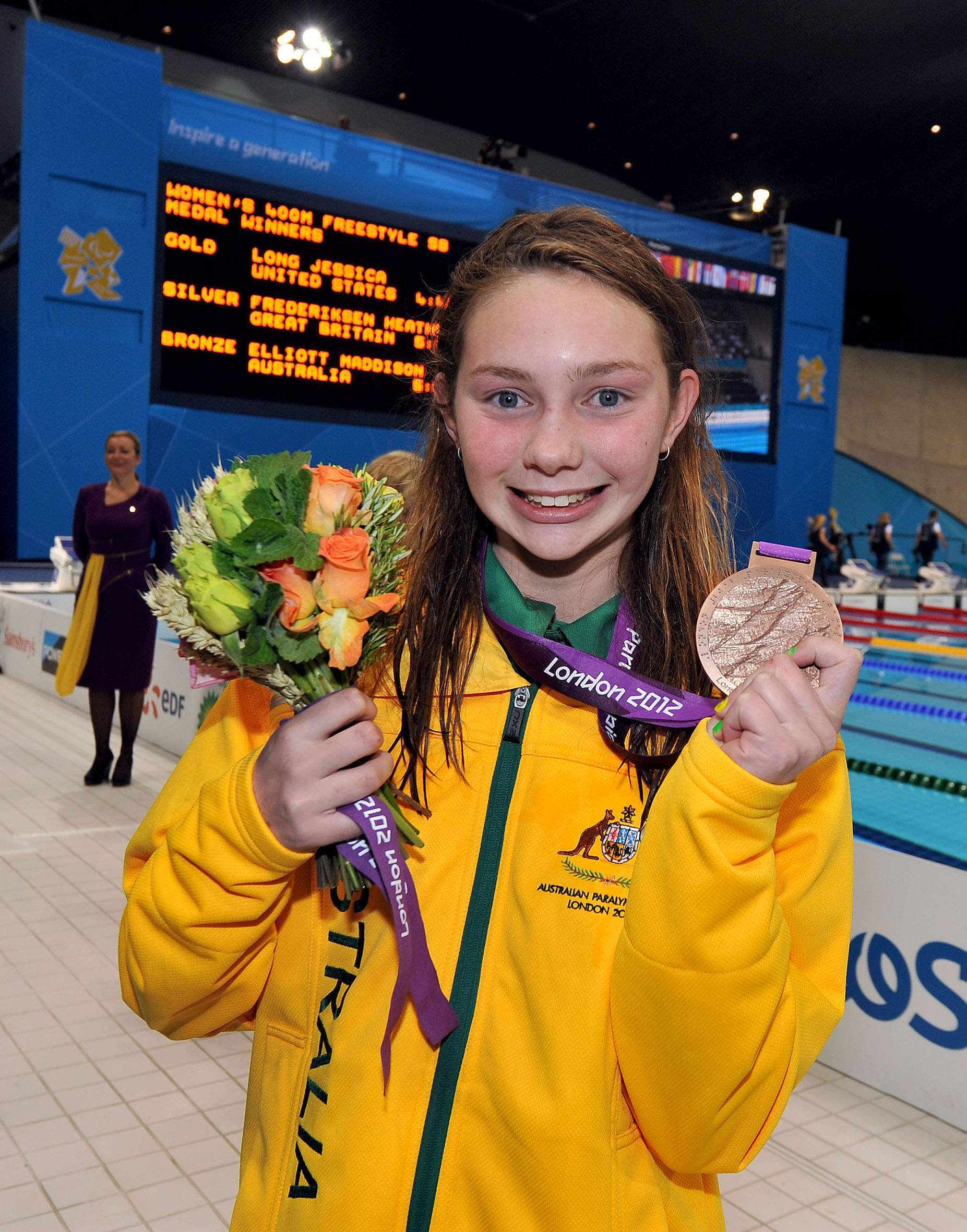
Elliott at the 2012 Summer Paralympics

By 2010, Elliott held three Australian age group classification records, and the 2010 New South Wales Multi-Class Long Course Swimming Championships, she had five first-place finishes. She represented Australia at the 2011 Oceania Paralympic Championships, and later that year competed in the Canberra hosted Australian Multi-Class Age Swimming Championships. At that event, she won a bronze, five silver and three gold medals. She was selected to represent Australia at the 2012 Summer Paralympics in London in swimming.

On 31 August 2012 at the London Aquatics Centre, Elliott slashed 23 seconds off her personal best time to win a bronze medal in the S8 400 m freestyle. She went on to win silver in S8 50 m freestyle, bronze in the S8 100 m Freestyle, and gold in the Women's 4x100 m Freestyle Relay – 34 Points. She thus became, at age 13, the youngest ever Australian to win a Paralympic medal, surpassing Anne Currie, or a gold medal, a record formerly held by Elizabeth Edmondson. Afterwards, she met with Prince Harry and gave him a Lizzie the Frill Neck Lizard, the mascot of the Australian Paralympic Committee and Australia's Paralympic Teams. This resulted in the Australian Chef de Mission, Jason Hellwig, officially presenting Lizzie to the Chairman of the London Organising Committee of the Olympic and Paralympic Games (LOCOG), Lord Coe, who gave him a Mandeville in return.

In November 2012, Elliott and Rheed McCracken, the youngest members of the 2012 Paralympic Team, were together named the Paralympic Junior Athlete of the Year. She won gold medals in the Women's 50 m and 100 m Freestyle S8 events and a silver medal in the Women's 400 m Freestyle S8 at the August 2013 IPC Swimming World Championships in Montreal, Canada, and was awarded a Medal of the Order of Australia in the 2014 Australia Day Honours "for service to sport as a Gold Medallist at the London 2012 Paralympic Games."

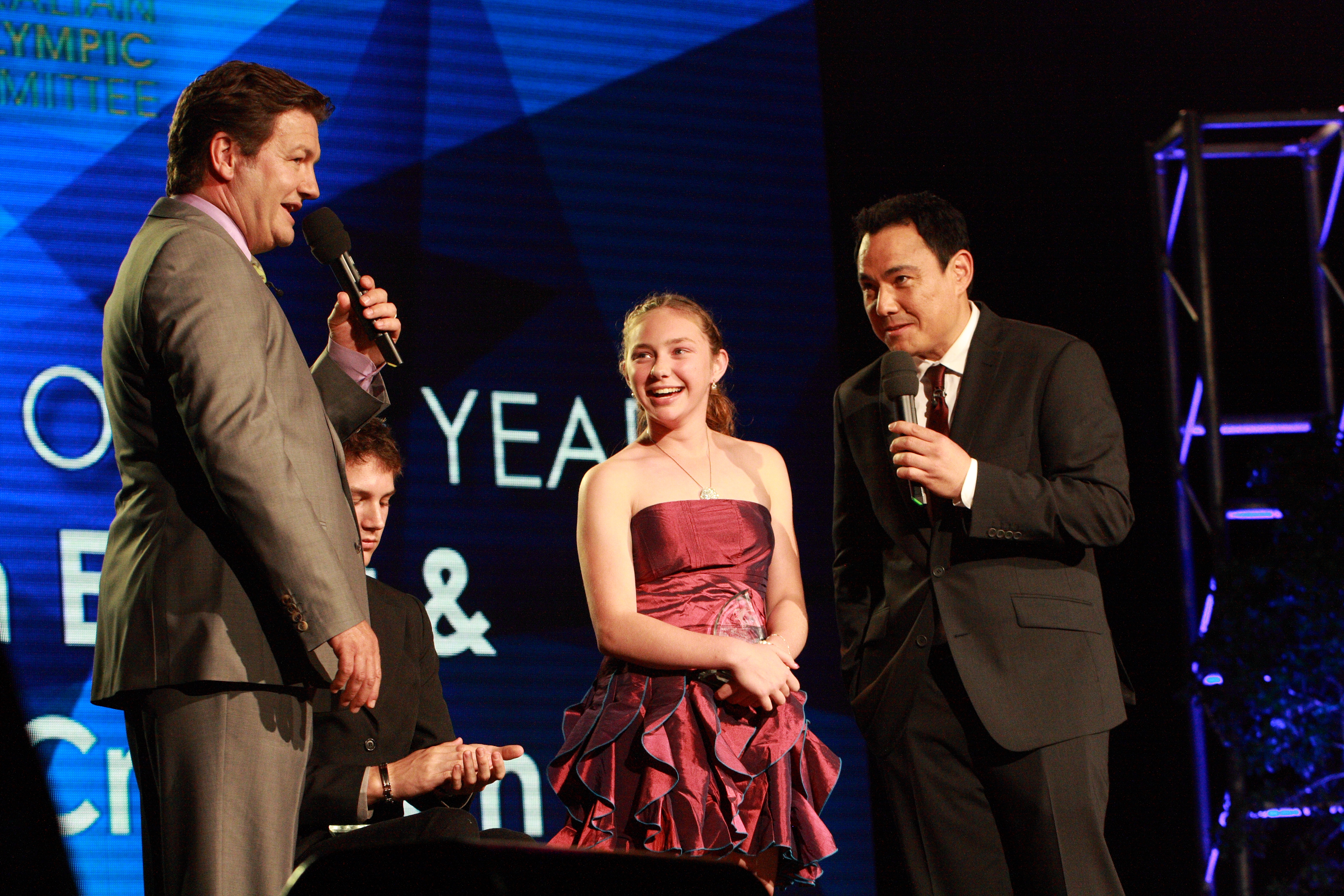
Elliott interviewed after being named 2012 Junior Athlete of the Year at the Australian Paralympian of the Year ceremony

Elliott won a gold medal at the 2014 Commonwealth Games in Glasgow in the women's 100 m S8 freestyle in a world record time of 1:05.32, breaking the record set by Jessica Long in 2012.

At the 2015 IPC Swimming World Championships, Elliott won the gold medals in the women's 50 m freestyle S8, women's 100 m freestyle S8 in a world record time of 1.04.71, women's 100 m backstroke S8 and women's 4 × 100 m freestyle relay 34 points, silver medals in the women's 400 m freestyle S8 and women's 4 × 100 m medley relay 34 points and a bronze medal in the women's 100 m butterfly S8.

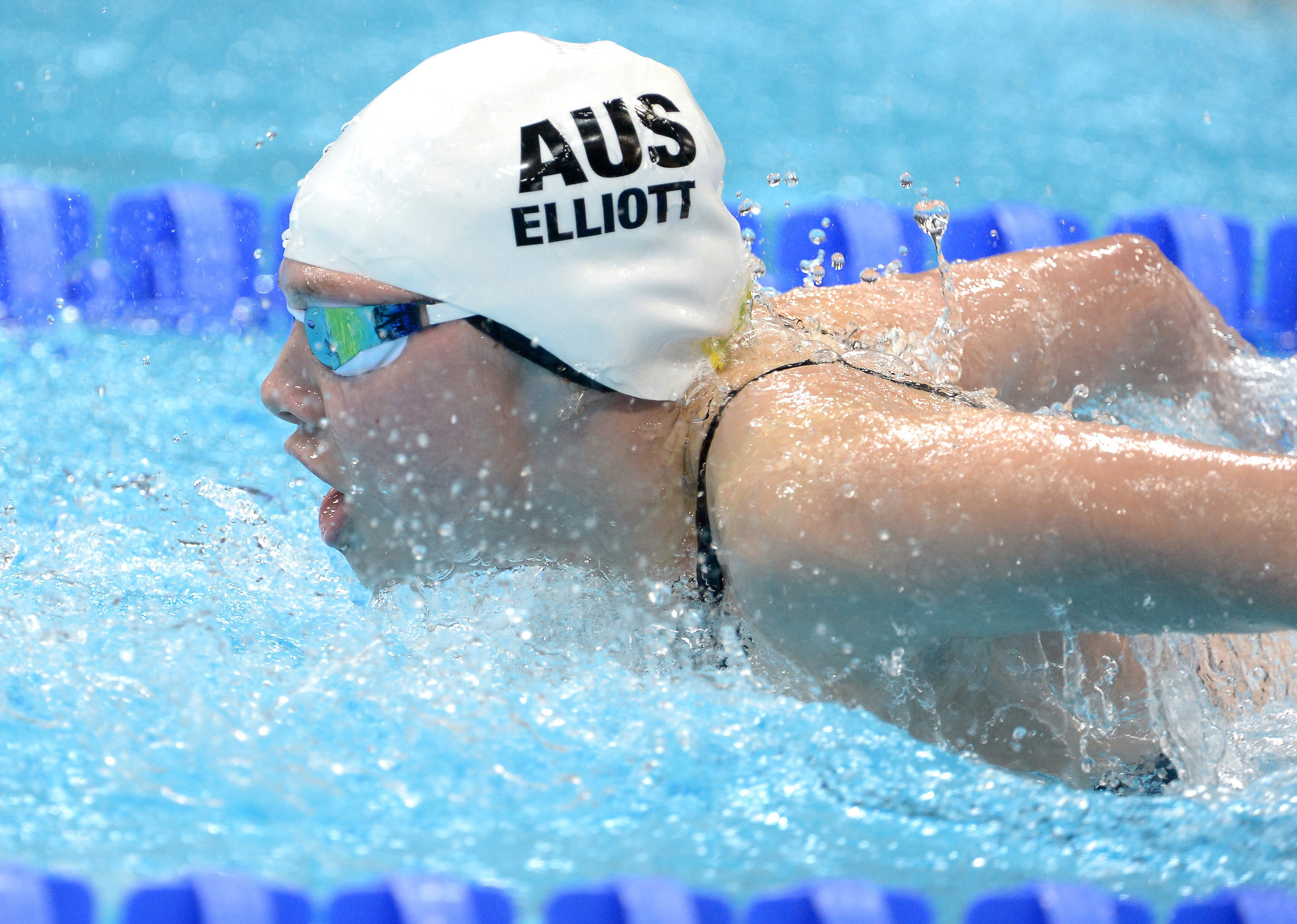
Elliott at the 2012 Summer Paralympics

Her success at the IPC World Championships led to her being awarded Swimming Australia's 2015 Paralympic Swimmer of the Year. In November 2015, she was awarded the New South Wales Institute of Sport Regional Athlete of the Year.

At the 2016 Rio Paralympics, she was a member of the team that won gold in world record time in the 4 x 100 freestyle relay 34 points, alongside Ellie Cole, Lakeisha Patterson and Ashleigh McConnell. She won her first individual Paralympic gold medal in winning the 100 metre freestyle S8 in a Paralympic record time of 1:04.73, and followed this with gold in the 50 metre freestyle S8 in a world record time of 29.73. In addition, she won silver medals in the 100 metre backstroke S8 and 4 x 100 Medley Relay 34 points. After Elliot's success in the 2016 Rio Paralympics, she was crowned early December as the Australian Paralympic Female Athlete of the Year, adding to her impressive list of accolades.

In 2017, Elliott was reclassified to S9 and subsequently was not selected on Australian teams at the 2018 Commonwealth Games and World Para Swimming Championships. In 2019, Elliott reported that she was subjected to cyber bullying as a result of classification issues.

== Recognition ==
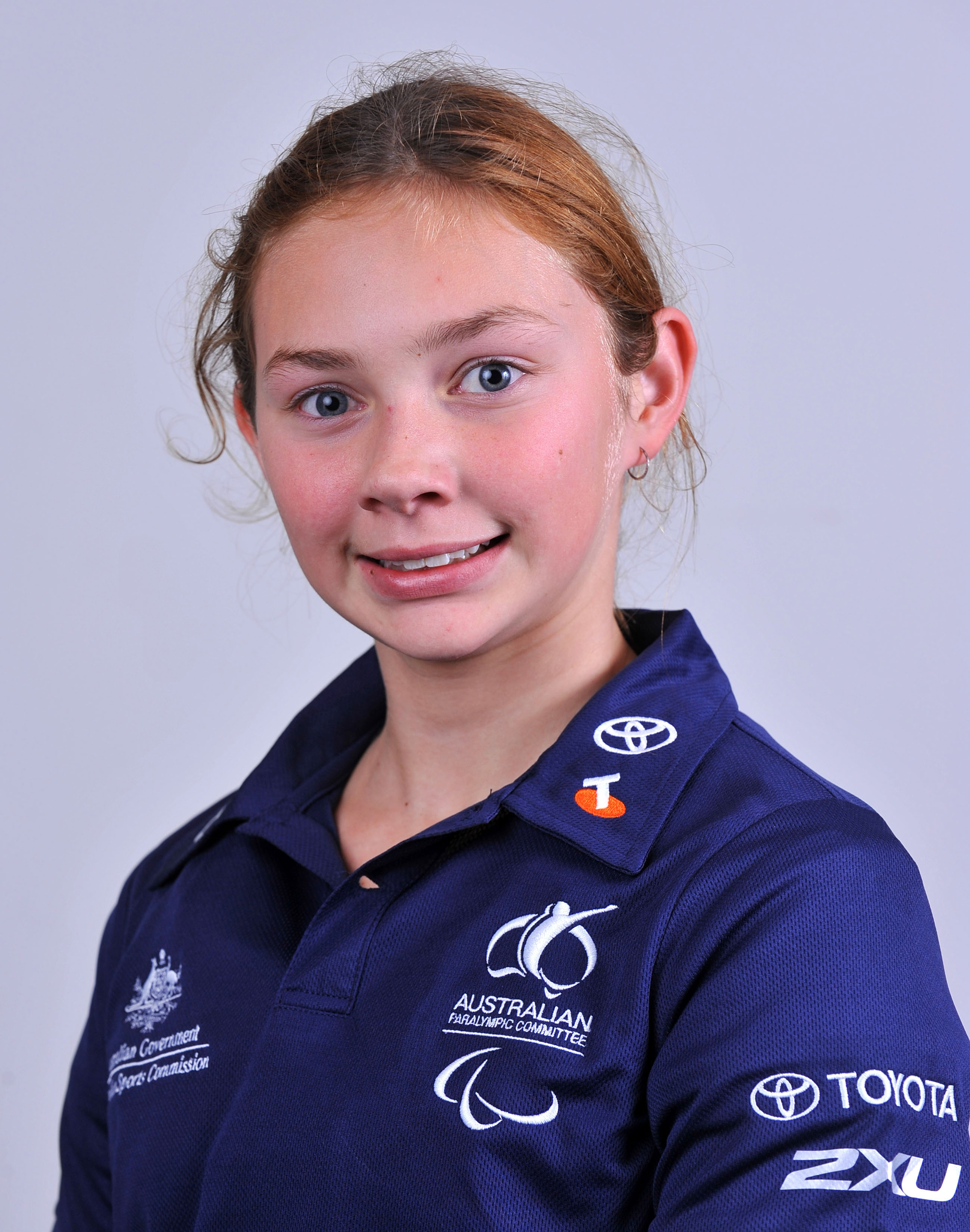
2012 Australian Paralympic Team official photo

- 2012 – Australian Paralympic Junior Athlete of the Year
- 2014 – Medal of the Order of Australia
- 2015 – Paralympic Swimmer of the Year at the Swimming Australia awards.
- 2015 – NSWIS Regional Athlete of the Year
- 2015 – NSW Athlete of the Year with a Disability
- 2016 – Paralympic Swimmer of the Year at the Swimming Australia awards.
- 2016 – NSWIS Female Athlete of the Year, NSWIS Regional Athlete of the Year, NSWIS Junior Athlete of the Year
- 2016 – Australian Paralympic Female Athlete of the Year.
