= Jessica Long =

Russian-American Paralympic swimmer (born 1992)

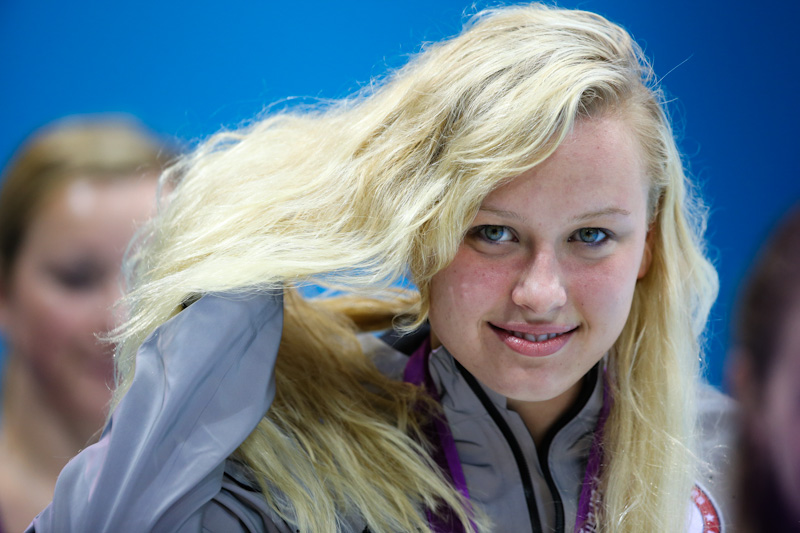
- Long in 2012

Personal information
- Full name: Jessica Tatiana Long
- National team: United States
- Born: Tatiana Olegovna Kirillova; February 29, 1992 (age 34) Bratsk, Russia
- Height: 5 ft 11 in (1.80 m) (with prosthetics) 4 ft 8 in (1.42 m) (without prosthetics)
- Weight: 130 lb (59 kg) (with prosthetics) 115 lb (52 kg) (without prosthetics)
- Website: jessicalong.com

Sport
- Sport: Swimming
- Strokes: Butterfly, Backstroke, Breastroke, Freestyle
- Classifications: S8/SB7/SM8
- Club: North Baltimore Aquatic Club
- Coach: Paul Yetter
Medal record
Event	1st	2nd	3rd
Paralympic Games	17	8	5
World Championships (LC)	33	11	3
World Championships (SC)	4	4	0
Total	54	23	8
Women's para swimming
Representing the United States
Paralympic Games
Gold medal – first place	2004 Athens	100m freestyle S8
Gold medal – first place	2004 Athens	400m freestyle S8
Gold medal – first place	2004 Athens	4×100m freestyle relay 34pts
Gold medal – first place	2008 Beijing	100m freestyle S8
Gold medal – first place	2008 Beijing	400m freestyle S8
Gold medal – first place	2008 Beijing	100m butterfly S8
Gold medal – first place	2008 Beijing	200m medley SM8
Gold medal – first place	2012 London	100m freestyle S8
Gold medal – first place	2012 London	400m freestyle S8
Gold medal – first place	2012 London	100m breaststroke SB7
Gold medal – first place	2012 London	100m butterfly S8
Gold medal – first place	2012 London	200m medley SM8
Gold medal – first place	2016 Rio de Janeiro	200m medley SM8
Gold medal – first place	2020 Tokyo	200m medley SM8
Gold medal – first place	2020 Tokyo	4×100m medley relay 34pts
Gold medal – first place	2020 Tokyo	100m butterfly S8
Gold medal – first place	2024 Paris	400 m freestyle S8
Gold medal – first place	2024 Paris	100 m butterfly S8
Silver medal – second place	2008 Beijing	100m backstroke S8
Silver medal – second place	2012 London	100m backstroke S8
Silver medal – second place	2012 London	4x100m freestyle relay 34 pts
Silver medal – second place	2016 Rio de Janeiro	400m freestyle S8
Silver medal – second place	2016 Rio de Janeiro	100m breaststroke SB7
Silver medal – second place	2016 Rio de Janeiro	4×100m freestyle relay 34pts
Silver medal – second place	2020 Tokyo	400m freestyle S8
Silver medal – second place	2020 Tokyo	100m breaststroke SB7
Bronze medal – third place	2008 Beijing	100m breaststroke SB7
Bronze medal – third place	2012 London	4x100m medley relay 34 pts
Bronze medal – third place	2016 Rio de Janeiro	100m backstroke S8
Bronze medal – third place	2016 Rio de Janeiro	100m butterfly S8
Bronze medal – third place	2020 Tokyo	100m backstroke S8
IPC Swimming World Championships (LC)
Gold medal – first place	2006 Durban	50m freestyle S8
Gold medal – first place	2006 Durban	100m freestyle S8
Gold medal – first place	2006 Durban	400m freestyle S8
Gold medal – first place	2006 Durban	100m backstroke S8
Gold medal – first place	2006 Durban	100m breaststroke SB7
Gold medal – first place	2006 Durban	100m butterfly S8
Gold medal – first place	2006 Durban	200m medley SM8
Gold medal – first place	2006 Durban	4x100m freestyle relay 34pts
Gold medal – first place	2006 Durban	4x100m medley relay 34pts
Gold medal – first place	2010 Eindhoven	100m freestyle S8
Gold medal – first place	2010 Eindhoven	400m freestyle S8
Gold medal – first place	2010 Eindhoven	100m backstroke S8
Gold medal – first place	2010 Eindhoven	100m butterfly S8
Gold medal – first place	2010 Eindhoven	200m medley SM8
Gold medal – first place	2010 Eindhoven	4x100m freestyle relay 34 pts
Gold medal – first place	2010 Eindhoven	4x100m medley relay 34 pts
Gold medal – first place	2013 Montreal	400m freestyle S8
Gold medal – first place	2013 Montreal	100m butterfly S8
Gold medal – first place	2013 Montreal	200m medley SM8
Gold medal – first place	2015 Glasgow	400m freestyle S8
Gold medal – first place	2015 Glasgow	100m breaststroke SB7
Gold medal – first place	2015 Glasgow	100m butterfly S8
Gold medal – first place	2015 Glasgow	200m medley SM8
Gold medal – first place	2017 Mexico City	100m freestyle S8
Gold medal – first place	2017 Mexico City	400m freestyle S8
Gold medal – first place	2017 Mexico City	100m backstroke S8
Gold medal – first place	2017 Mexico City	100m breaststroke SB7
Gold medal – first place	2017 Mexico City	100m butterfly S8
Gold medal – first place	2017 Mexico City	200m medley SM8
Gold medal – first place	2017 Mexico City	4x100m freestyle relay 34 pts
Gold medal – first place	2017 Mexico City	4x100m medley relay 34 pts
Gold medal – first place	2023 Manchester	100m butterfly S8
Gold medal – first place	2023 Manchester	200m medley SM8
Silver medal – second place	2010 Eindhoven	50m freestyle S8
Silver medal – second place	2010 Eindhoven	100m breaststroke SB7
Silver medal – second place	2013 Montreal	100m freestyle S8
Silver medal – second place	2015 Glasgow	100m freestyle S8
Silver medal – second place	2015 Glasgow	100m backstroke S8
Silver medal – second place	2015 Glasgow	4x100m freestyle relay 34 pts
Silver medal – second place	2019 London	100m freestyle S8
Silver medal – second place	2019 London	100m butterfly S8
Silver medal – second place	2019 London	200m medley SM8
Silver medal – second place	2019 London	4x100m freestyle relay 34 pts
Silver medal – second place	2019 London	4x100 m medley relay 34 pts
Bronze medal – third place	2013 Montreal	4x100 m freestyle relay 34 pts
Bronze medal – third place	2019 London	400m freestyle S8
Bronze medal – third place	2025 Singapore	100m freestyle S8
IPC Swimming World Championships (SC)
Gold medal – first place	2009 Rio de Janeiro	100 m freestyle S8
Gold medal – first place	2009 Rio de Janeiro	400m freestyle S8
Gold medal – first place	2009 Rio de Janeiro	100m breaststroke SB7
Gold medal – first place	2009 Rio de Janeiro	100m butterfly S8
Silver medal – second place	2009 Rio de Janeiro	50m freestyle S8
Silver medal – second place	2009 Rio de Janeiro	100m backstroke S8
Silver medal – second place	2009 Rio de Janeiro	200m medley SM8
Silver medal – second place	2009 Rio de Janeiro	4x100m freestyle relay 34 pts

Jessica Tatiana Long PLY (born February 29, 1992) is a Russian-born American Paralympic swimmer from Baltimore, Maryland, who competes in the S8, SB7 and SM8 category events. She has held many world records and competed at six Paralympic Games, winning 31 medals (18 of them gold). She has won over 50 world championship medals.

== Early life ==
Long was born Tatiana Olegovna Kirillova in Bratsk, Russia. At the time she was born, her mother and father were unwed teenagers, 18 and 17 years old respectively. She was adopted by American parents at the age of 13 months. Because of fibular hemimelia, her lower legs were amputated when she was 18 months old. She learned to walk with prostheses. Long has been involved in many sports including gymnastics, cheerleading, ice skating, biking, trampoline, and rock climbing. She began swimming in her grandparents' pool before joining her first competitive team in 2002. The next year, Long was selected as Maryland Swimming's 2003 Female Swimmer with a Disability of the Year. Long trained with the North Baltimore Aquatic Club.

Long's brother, Joshua, was adopted at the same time from the same Siberian orphanage.

== International swimming career ==
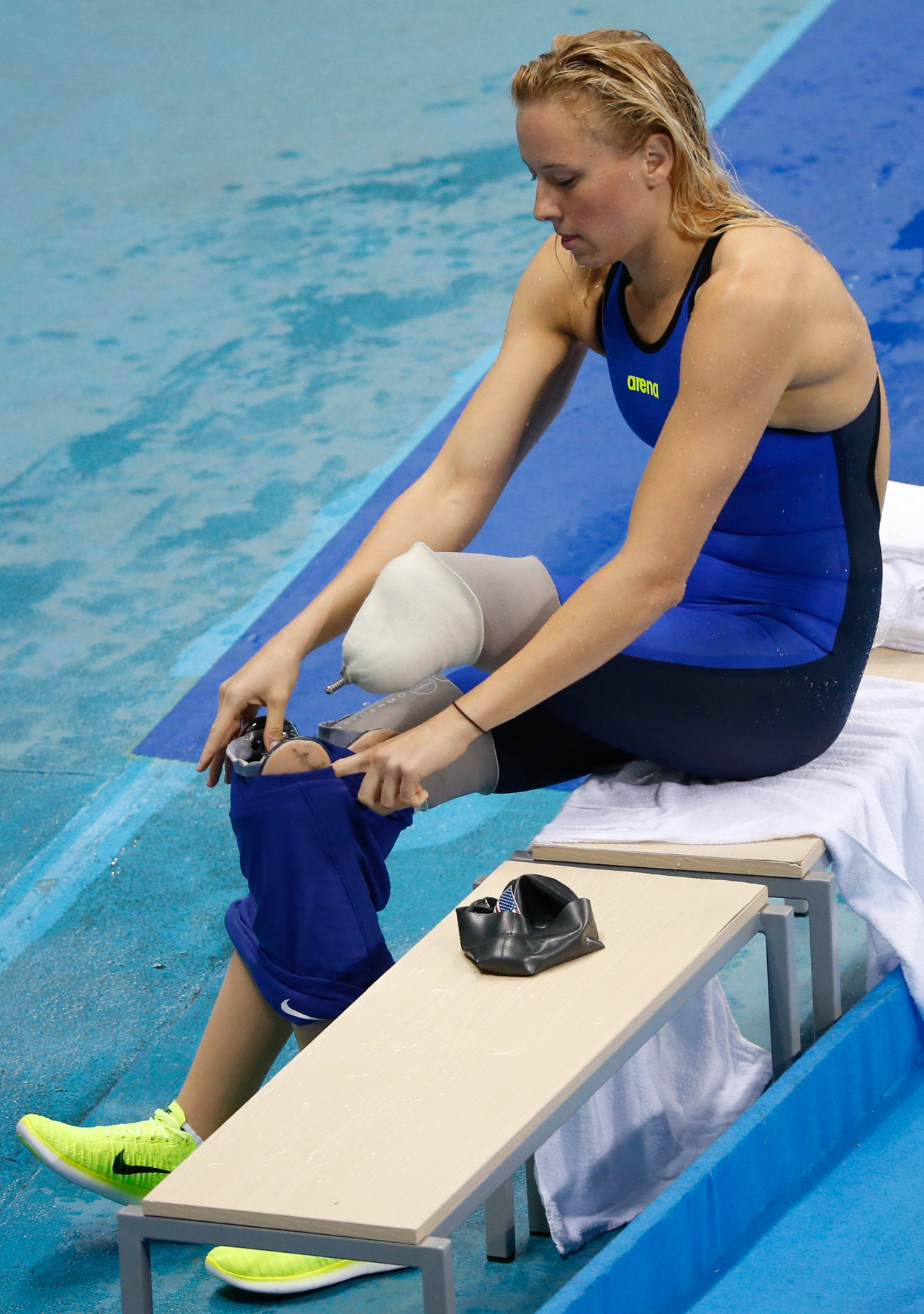
Long at the 2016 Paralympics

Long entered the international stage at the 2004 Paralympic Games in Athens, Greece, winning three gold medals in swimming. Aged twelve at the time, she was the youngest competitor on the U.S. Paralympic Team. Long had 18 world record-breaking performances in 2006. Her performance at the 2006 International Paralympic Committee (IPC) Swimming World Championships in Durban, South Africa, where she won nine gold medals for her participation in seven individual medleys and two relays. She also held five world records which made her known from outside the world of Paralympic sport. In 2006, Long became the first Paralympic athlete selected as the AAU's James E. Sullivan Award winner. She was honored as the U.S. Olympic Committee's 2006 Paralympian of the year and Swimming World Magazine's 2006 Disabled Swimmer of the Year.

In June 2021 the US announced the 34 Paralympic swimmers who would be going to the delayed 2020 Summer Paralympics in Tokyo. Long was named as the lead for the women's team of McKenzie Coan, Elizabeth Marks, Rebecca Meyers and Mallory Weggemann.

On April 14, 2022, Long was named to the roster to represent the United States at the 2022 World Para Swimming Championships. On April 29, 2023, Long was named to the roster to represent the United States at the 2023 World Para Swimming Championships.

At the 2024 Summer Paralympics Long won two gold medals. The U.S. Olympic and Paralympic committee barred Long from the 2024 Summer Paralympics Closing Ceremony after Long questioned Christie Raleigh Crossley's disability on social media and allegations of long term bullying were made. Long also received a suspension from the US Paralympic Swimming National Team.

Major achievements:

CR: Championship Record; WR: World Record

- 2004: Three gold medals, 100m freestyle, 400m freestyle, 4 × 100 m freestyle relay – Paralympic Games, Athens, Greece
- 2005: Five gold medals, bronze medal, two world records, and named Swimmer of the Meet – 2005 U.S. Paralympics Open Swimming Championships, Minneapolis, Minnesota
- 2006: Two world records (100m butterfly, 200m individual medley) – Blaze Sports Georgia Open, Atlanta, Georgia
- 2006: U.S. Olympic Committee Female Athlete of the Month – January 2006
- 2006: Five gold medals, silver medal, four world records (50m breaststroke, 50m butterfly, 200m breaststroke, 400m individual medley) – Can-Am Championships, London, Ontario, Canada
- 2006: Named winner of 77th AAU James E. Sullivan Award
- 2006: Named Disabled Swimmer of the Year by Swimming World magazine
- 2006: Named U.S. Olympic Committee Paralympian of the Year
- 2006: Second place Rock Climbing Speed Climbing – Extremity Games
- 2006: Selected as USA Swimming's Disability Swimmer of the Year (Trischa L. Zorn Award)
- 2006: Two world records (100m butterfly, 200m individual medley) – Belgian Open, Antwerp, Belgium
- 2006: Nine gold medals (100m freestyle – WR, 100m butterfly – WR, 200m individual medley – WR, 400m freestyle – WR, 34pts 4 × 100 m freestyle relay – WR, 50m freestyle, 100m backstroke, 100m breaststroke, 34pts 4 × 100 m medley relay) – International Paralympic Committee (IPC) Swimming World Championships, Durban, South Africa
- 2007: Three world records (200m backstroke, 400m individual medley, 800m freestyle) – Spring Can-Am Swimming Championships, Montreal, Canada
- 2007: Three world records (50m butterfly, 200m freestyle, 1500m freestyle) – GTAC Disability Open, Oakland University, Rochester, Michigan
- 2007: Recipient of the ESPN Best Female Athlete with a Disability ESPY Award
- 2007: Selected as USA Swimming's Disability Swimmer of the Year (Trischa L. Zorn Award)
- 2007: First place, 50m backstroke, 50m butterfly, 100m backstroke, 100m breaststroke, 100m freestyle, 200m butterfly; second place, 50m freestyle – U.S. Paralympics Open Swimming Championships, College Park, Md.
- 2008: World record, S8 100m butterfly – Can-Am Championships, Victoria, Canada
- 2008: Recipient of Juan Antonio Samaranch IOC Disabled Athlete Award
- 2008: Four gold medals, three world records (400m freestyle – WR, 100m freestyle – WR, 200m individual medley – WR, 100m butterfly); silver medal (100m backstroke); bronze medal (100m breaststroke) – International Paralympic Committee (IPC) – Paralympic Games, Beijing, China
- 2009: Seven gold medals (100m breaststroke, 100m butterfly, 50m freestyle, 50m butterfly, 400m freestyle, 50m breaststroke, 100m freestyle) – Spring Can-Am Championships, Gresham, Oregon
- 2009: Seven gold medals, world record, S8 100m breaststroke – Summer Can-Am Championships, Edmonton, Alberta, Canada
- 2009: Four gold medals and world records (100m freestyle – WR, 400m freestyle – WR, 100m breaststroke – WR, 100m butterfly – WR); four silver medals (50m freestyle, 100m individual medley, 200m individual medley, 34 pts 4 × 100 m freestyle relay) – International Paralympic Committee (IPC) Swimming World Championships 25m, Rio de Janeiro, Brazil
- 2010: Six gold medals (50m freestyle, 100m freestyle, 400m freestyle, 100m breaststroke, 100m butterfly, 100m breaststroke) – Can-Am National Championships, San Antonio, Texas
- 2010: Seven gold medals, two world records (100m freestyle, 400m freestyle, 100m backstroke, 100m butterfly, 200m individual medley – WR, 34pts 4 × 100 m freestyle relay – WR, 34pts 4 × 100 m medley relay); two silver medals (50m freestyle, 100m breaststroke) – International Paralympic Committee (IPC) Swimming World Championships, Eindhoven, the Netherlands
- 2011: Nine gold medals, four world records (50m freestyle, 100m freestyle – WR, 400m freestyle – WR, 100m butterfly – WR, 100m backstroke, 100m breaststroke, 200m individual medley – WR, 34pts 4 × 100 m freestyle relay, 34pts 4 × 100 m medley relay) – Pan Pacific Para Swimming Championships, Edmonton, Canada
- 2011: Six gold medals (100m freestyle, 100m breaststroke, 50m backstroke, 100m backstroke, 100m butterfly, 200m individual medley) – Can-Am Open Swimming Championship, La Mirada, California
- 2011: Named Disabled Swimmer of the Year by Swimming World magazine
- 2012: Recipient of the ESPN Best Female Athlete with a Disability ESPY Award
- 2012: Five gold medals (100m butterfly, 400m freestyle, 100m breaststroke, 200m indiv. medley, 100m freestyle); two silver medals (4 × 100 m freestyle 34pts, 100m backstroke); bronze medal (4 × 100 m medley 34pts) – International Paralympic Committee (IPC) – Paralympic Summer Games, London, England
- 2012: Named U.S. Paralympic SportsWoman of the Year by the United States Olympic Committee
- 2013: Three gold medals (100m freestyle, 200m individual medley, 400m Free) – U.S. Paralympics Spring Swimming Nationals/Can-Am, Minneapolis, Minnesota
- 2013: Three gold medals, world record (200m individual medley, 400m freestyle, 100m butterfly – WR); silver medal (100m freestyle); bronze medal (4X100m freestyle) – International Paralympic Committee (IPC) Swimming World Championships, Montreal, Quebec, Canada
- 2013: Recipient of the ESPN Best Female Athlete with a Disability ESPY Award
- 2014: Four gold medals (100m freestyle, 200m individual medley, 100m backstroke, 400m freestyle) – U.S. Paralympics Spring Swimming Nationals/Can-Am, Miami, Florida
- 2014: Six gold medals (100m freestyle, 100m breaststroke, 4x100 freestyle, 400m freestyle, 100m butterfly, 200 Individual Medley); two silver medals (100m backstroke, 4X100 medley) – Pan Pacific Para-Swimming Championships, Pasadena, California
- 2014: Named Para-Swimming Female Athlete of the Year by swimming news website SwimSwam
- 2015: Four gold medals (100m butterfly, 100m breaststroke, 200m individual medley, 400m freestyle); three silver medals (100m freestyle, 4 × 100 m freestyle relay, 100m backstroke) – International Paralympic Committee (IPC) Swimming World Championships, Glasgow, Scotland
- 2015: Selected as USA Swimming's Disability Swimmer of the Year (Trischa L. Zorn Award)
- 2016: One gold medal (200m individual medley SM8); three silver medals (100 m breaststroke SB7, 400 m freestyle S8, 4×100 m freestyle 34 pts ); two bronze medals (100 m butterfly S8, 100 m backstroke S8) – International Paralympic Committee (IPC) – Paralympic Summer Games, Rio de Janeiro, Brazil

== In popular media ==
A special NBC broadcast in 2014, Long Way Home, followed Long's journey to meet her biological parents. The story of her adoption was portrayed in a Toyota ad, titled Upstream, which ran as a Super Bowl commercial in 2021 and during the 2020 Summer Olympics and 2020 Summer Paralympics.

== See also ==
- List of IPC world records in swimming
- List of Paralympic records in swimming

== Bibliography ==
- Long, Jessica with Hannah Long. Unsinkable: From Russian Orphan to Paralympic Swimming World Champion. China, Houghton Mifflin Harcourt, June 26, 2018. ISBN 978-1-328-70725-3.

Awards and achievements
Preceded by Sarah Reinertsen; Mallory Weggemann	Best Female Athlete with a Disability ESPY Award; 2007; 2012, 2013	Succeeded by Shay Oberg; Jamie Whitmore
