= Mallory Weggemann =

American Paralympic swimmer

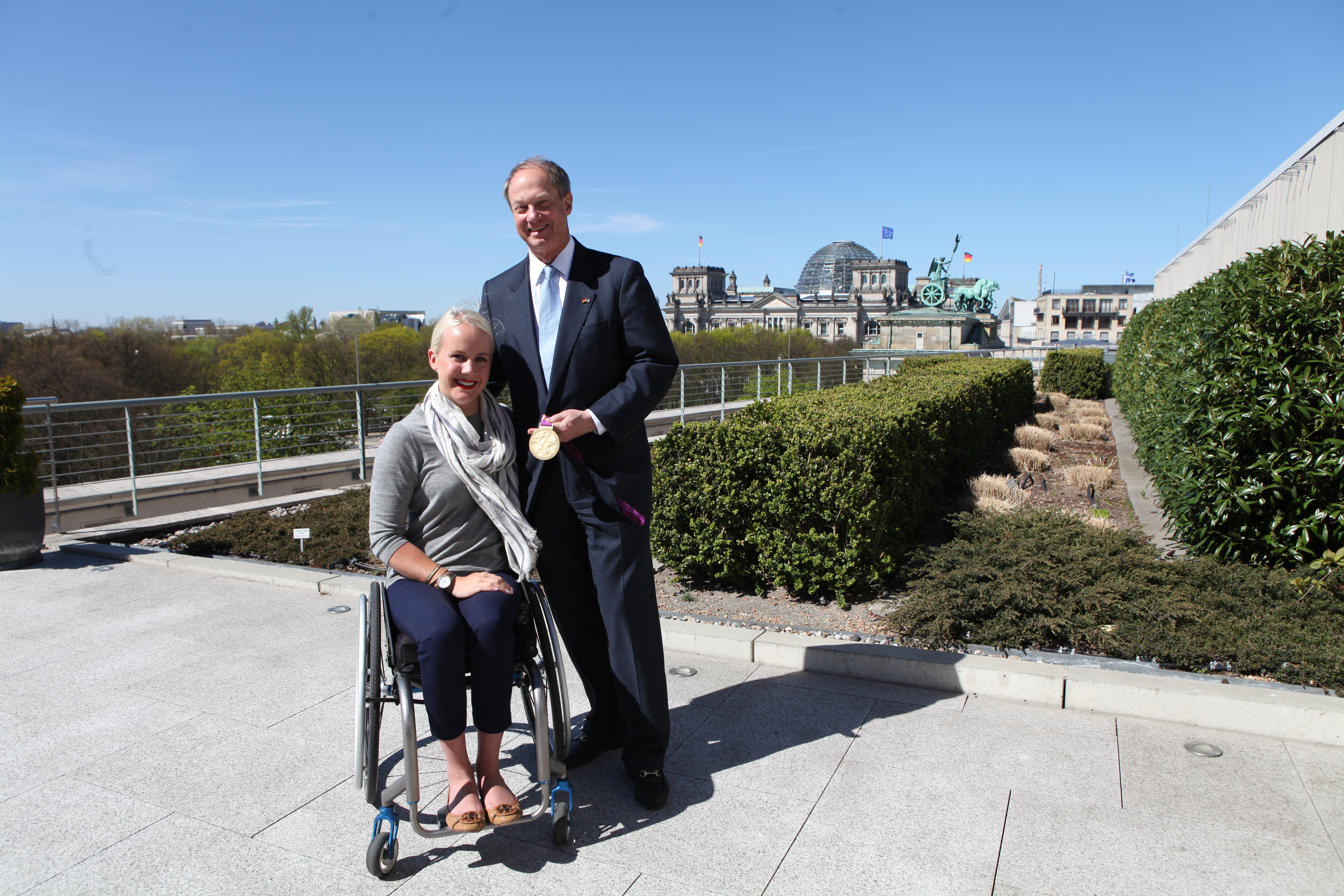
- Weggemann in Berlin, with Ambassador John B. Emerson (2015)

Personal information
- Nationality: American
- Born: March 26, 1989 (age 37) Lawrence, Kansas, U.S.
- Height: 5 ft 9 in (1.75 m)
- Website: malloryweggemannusa.com

Sport
- Sport: Swimming
- Disability: Paraplegia
- Disability class: S7, SB6, SM7
- Club: FINIS & JOLYN
- Coached by: Steve Van Dyne
Medal record
Representing United States
Swimming
Paralympic Games
Gold medal – first place	2020 Tokyo	200m ind. medley SM7
Gold medal – first place	2020 Tokyo	100m backstroke S7
Gold medal – first place	2024 Paris	200m ind. medley SM7
Silver medal – second place	2020 Tokyo	50m butterfly S7
Silver medal – second place	2024 Paris	50m butterfly S7
Gold medal – first place	2012 London	50m freestyle S8
Bronze medal – third place	2012 London	4×100m medley relay 34pts
World Championships (SC)
Gold medal – first place	2009 Rio de Janeiro	50m freestyle S7
Gold medal – first place	2009 Rio de Janeiro	50m butterfly S7
Gold medal – first place	2009 Rio de Janeiro	100m freestyle S7
Gold medal – first place	2009 Rio de Janeiro	400m freestyle S7
Gold medal – first place	2009 Rio de Janeiro	4x50m freestyle relay 20pts
World Championships (LC)
Gold medal – first place	2010 Eindhoven	50m freestyle S7
Gold medal – first place	2010 Eindhoven	100m freestyle S7
Gold medal – first place	2010 Eindhoven	400m freestyle S7
Gold medal – first place	2010 Eindhoven	50m butterfly S7
Gold medal – first place	2010 Eindhoven	100m breaststroke SB6
Gold medal – first place	2010 Eindhoven	200m ind. medley SM7
Gold medal – first place	2010 Eindhoven	4x100m freestyle relay 34pts
Gold medal – first place	2010 Eindhoven	4x100m medley relay 34pts
Gold medal – first place	2019 London	50m freestyle S7
Gold medal – first place	2019 London	50m butterfly S7
Gold medal – first place	2025 Singapore	200m ind. medley SM7
Gold medal – first place	2025 Singapore	50 m freestyle S7
Silver medal – second place	2010 Eindhoven	100m backstroke S7
Silver medal – second place	2019 London	200m ind. medley SM7
Silver medal – second place	2025 Singapore	50 m butterfly S7
Bronze medal – third place	2025 Singapore	100m backstroke S7
Parapan American Games
Gold medal – first place	2015 Toronto	100m freestyle S8
Gold medal – first place	2015 Toronto	200m ind. medley SM8
Silver medal – second place	2015 Toronto	50m freestyle S8
Silver medal – second place	2015 Toronto	400m freestyle S8
Bronze medal – third place	2015 Toronto	100m backstroke S8
Bronze medal – third place	2023 Santiago	200m ind. medley SM7

Mallory Weggemann (born March 26, 1989) is an American Paralympic swimmer.

== Career ==
She became a T10-complete paraplegic after an epidural injection to treat post-shingles back pain in 2008. She broke many world records in the S7 classification, and won multiple gold medals at the IPC Swimming World Championships in 2009 and 2010. At the 2012 Paralympics, she was controversially reclassified to S8, a class for swimmers with less impairment. She won the S8 50 metre freestyle event in a new Paralympic record time.

Just under four months after becoming paralyzed Mallory was back in the pool, with her eyes on gold at the 2012 Paralympic Games. Having achieved that goal, she decided it was time to chase her dream, to walk again. For years, this was something that was deemed impossible, but a new possibility arose and in order to achieve her goal, Mallory reached out to the public to ask for their support through a crowd funding Indiegogo campaign. On November 16, 2013, Mallory was able to "walk" again for the first time in nearly six years, with the aid of customized leg braces and forearm crutches. Although Mallory's wheelchair will never be replaced by her braces and crutches, they have allowed her to have short moments of upright mobility.

Weggemann trained for the 2016 Paralympic Games in Rio de Janeiro, Brazil and actively building upon her career outside of the pool through motivational speaking. Mallory was featured in "The Current," a documentary produced by Make A Hero, a non-profit organization focused on inspiring individuals with disabilities to enjoy the freedom of adaptive sports.

In June 2021 the US announced the 34 Paralympic swimmers who would be going to the delayed 2020 Summer Paralympics in Tokyo. The women's team was Weggemann, Jessica Long, McKenzie Coan, Rebecca Meyers and Elizabeth Marks. Weggmann would go on to win several medals and break two records during the Tokyo Games.

On April 14, 2022, Weggemann was named to the roster to represent the United States at the 2022 World Para Swimming Championships.

== Honors and awards ==
- World Disabled Swimmer of the Year - 2009, 2010
- USA Swimming Disabled Swimmer of the Year (Trischa L. Zorn Award) - 2009, 2010, 2011
- Best Female Athlete with a Disability ESPY Award - 2011

== Personal life ==
She lives in Eagan, Minnesota.
