= Morgan Bird =

Canadian para swimmer (born 1993)

Personal information
- Nickname: Birdie
- Born: September 6, 1993 (age 33) Regina, Saskatchewan, Canada
- Home town: Montreal, Quebec, Canada
- Height: 163 cm (5 ft 4 in)

Sport
- Country: Canada
- Sport: Para swimming
- Disability: Cerebral palsy
- Disability class: S8
- Coached by: Mike Thompson
Medal record
Women's para swimming
Representing Canada
Commonwealth Games
Silver medal – second place	2018 Gold Coast	50m freestyle S8
World Championships
Silver medal – second place	2013 Montreal	50m freestyle S8
Silver medal – second place	2013 Montreal	4x100m freestyle relay
Parapan American Games
Gold medal – first place	2015 Toronto	50m freestyle S8
Gold medal – first place	2015 Toronto	400m freestyle S8
Silver medal – second place	2015 Toronto	100m freestyle S8
Summer Paralympic Games
Bronze medal – third place	2020 Tokyo	4x100m freestyle 34pts

Morgan Bird (born September 6, 1993) is a Canadian para swimmer who competes in international level events, she specialises in freestyle. She won a bronze medal, at the 2020 Summer Paralympics, in Women's 34pts 4x100m relay. She is a double Parapan American Games champion and double World silver medalist.

== Early life and education ==
Morgan Bird was born in Regina, Saskatchewan in 1993 to parents Garth and Heidi Bird. She was born with cerebral palsy affecting the left side of her body. She began swimming as physiotherapy for her cerebral palsy and started swimming competitively at age 11. She has a bachelor of child studies from Mount Royal University in Calgary.

== Career ==
Bird made her Paralympic debut at the London 2012 Paralympic Games. She placed fourth in the women's 400 m freestyle S8. Alongside four members of Canada's 2012 Olympic Team and 10 fellow members Canada's Paralympic Team, she received a Queen's Diamond Jubilee Medal later that year. She won her first international medal at the 2013 IPC World Championships, winning bronze in both the 50m freestyle and in the relay.

Bird placed fourth in the S8 100-m freestyle at the 2014 Commonwealth Games At the 2015 Parapan American Games, she won gold in both the women's 400-metre freestyle S8 and 50-metre freestyle S8. She also won silver in the women's S8 100-metre freestyle. She placed fifth in the S8100-m freestyle at the Rio 2016 Paralympic Games. Bird won silver in the women's 50m freestyle S8 at the 2018 Commonwealth Games. Also at the 2018 Commonwealth Games, Bird moved up a category and competed in the S9 women's 100-m freestyle.

On a team with Katarina Roxon, Sabrina Duchesne, and Aurelie Rivard, Bird swam the opening leg and won a bronze medal at the 2020 Summer Paralympics, in Women's 34pts 4x100m relay.

Bird announced her retirement from competitive para-swimming in 2021.
