= List of IPC world records in swimming – Women's long course =

The world records in disability swimming are ratified by the International Paralympic Committee (IPC). These are the fastest performances in swimming events at meets sanctioned by the IPC.

This article lists the women's world records in long course competition. The International Paralympic Committee provides information on the current world records at their official site.

== 50 m freestyle ==
Event	Class	Time		Name	Nation	Date	Meet	Location	Ref
50 m freestyle	S1	51.33		Ingrid Thunem	Norway	15 July 2016	-	Kristiansand, Norway	
50 m freestyle	S2	53.94		Ingrid Thunem	Norway	5 August 2014	-	Eindhoven, Netherlands	
50 m freestyle	S3	39.11		Rachael Watson	Australia	25 January 2025	Vorgee Brisbane Sprint Championships	Brisbane, Australia	
50 m freestyle	S4	36.44		Katie Kubiak	United States	20 June 2025	-	Boise, United States	
50 m freestyle	S5	34.07		Tully Kearney	Great Britain	12 June 2022	World Para Championships	Funchal, Portugal	
50 m freestyle	S6	32.55		Anna Hontar	Ukraine	4 August 2023	World Para Championships	Manchester, United Kingdom	
50 m freestyle	S7	31.64		Mallory Weggemann	United States	17 August 2010	World Championships	Eindhoven, Netherlands	
50 m freestyle	S8	28.97		Alice Tai	Great Britain	8 June 2019	International German Championships	Berlin, Germany	
50 m freestyle	S9	27.23		Alexa Leary	Australia	17 May 2025	Sydney Open UniSport Nationals	Sydney, Australia	
50 m freestyle	S10	27.10		Chen Yi	China	29 August 2024	Paralympic Games	Paris, France	
50 m freestyle	S11	28.96		Ma Jia	China	31 August 2024	Paralympic Games	Paris, France	
50 m freestyle	S12	26.61		Maria Gomes	Brazil	1 June 2024	International German Championships	Berlin, Germany	
50 m freestyle	S13	26.56		Katja Dedekind	Australia	30 July 2022	Commonwealth Games	Birmingham, Great Britain	
50 m freestyle	S14	27.53	defunct category	Marlou van der Kulk	Netherlands	8 December 2013	Amsterdam Swim Cup	Amsterdam, Netherlands	

Legend: # – Record awaiting ratification by IPC; e – equalled existing record;
Records not set in finals: h – heat; sf – semifinal; r – relay 1st leg; rh – relay heat 1st leg; b – B final; † – en route to final mark; so – swim-off

== 100 m freestyle ==
Event	Class	Time	Name	Nation	Date	Meet	Location	Ref
100 m freestyle	S1	1:50.48	Ingrid Thunem	Norway	17 July 2016	-	Kristiansand, Norway	
100 m freestyle	S2	1:56.51	Ingrid Thunem	Norway	4 August 2014	European Championships	Eindhoven, Netherlands	
100 m freestyle	S3	1:26.76	Leanne Smith	United States	24 April 2025	Para Swimming World Series	Indianapolis, United States	
100 m freestyle	S4	1:17.72	Katie Kubiak	United States	24 April 2025	Para Swimming World Series	Indianapolis, United States	
100 m freestyle	S5	1:13.34	Tully Kearney	Great Britain	18 June 2022	World Para Championships	Funchal, Portugal	
100 m freestyle	S6	1:09.58	Jiang Yuyan	China	22 September 2025	World Para Championships	Singapore, Singapore	
100 m freestyle	S7	1:08.03	Jacqueline Freney	Australia	19 March 2012	Australian Olympic Trials	Adelaide, Australia	
100 m freestyle	S8	1:03.66	Alice Tai	Great Britain	31 May 2018	British Para-Swimming International Meet	Sheffield, Great Britain	
100 m freestyle	S9	58.89	Alexa Leary	Australia	18 May 2025	Sydney Open UniSport Nationals	Sydney, Australia	
100 m freestyle	S10	58.14	Aurélie Rivard	Canada	28 August 2021	Paralympic Games	Tokyo, Japan	
100 m freestyle	S11	1:04.88	Daria Lukianenko	Russia	7 September 2024	Paralympic Games	Paris, France	
100 m freestyle	S12	58.41	Oxana Savchenko	Russia	4 September 2012	Paralympic Games	London, Great Britain	
100 m freestyle	S13	57.34	Carlotta Gilli	Italy	30 June 2018	-	Rome, Italy	
100 m freestyle	S14	56.58	Bethany Firth	Great Britain	4 March 2016	-	Bangor, Northern Ireland	

Legend: # – Record awaiting ratification by IPC; e – equalled existing record;
Records not set in finals: h – heat; sf – semifinal; r – relay 1st leg; rh – relay heat 1st leg; b – B final; † – en route to final mark; so – swim-off

== 200 m freestyle ==
Event	Class	Time		Name	Nation	Date	meet	Location	Ref
200 m freestyle	S1	3:59.02		Ingrid Thunem	Norway	17 July 2016	-	Kristiansand, Norway	
200 m freestyle	S2	4:24.56		Arjola Trimi	Italy	24 September 2025	World Para Championships	Singapore, Singapore	
200 m freestyle	S3	3:09.65		Leanne Smith	United States	24 April 2025	Para Swimming World Series	Indianapolis, United States	
200 m freestyle	S4	2:44.97		Katie Kubiak	United States	20 June 2025	-	Boise, United States	
200 m freestyle	S5	2:42.36		Tully Kearney	Great Britain	17 June 2022	World Para Championships	Funchal, Portugal	
200 m freestyle	S6	2:35.09	†	Yelyzaveta Mereshko	Ukraine	13 September 2016	Paralympic Games	Rio de Janeiro, Brazil	
200 m freestyle	S7	2:26.01		Morgan Stickney	United States	1 December 2023	-	Greensboro, United States	
200 m freestyle	S8	2:16.04		Lakeisha Patterson	Australia	14 December 2017	-	Brisbane, Australia	
200 m freestyle	S9	2:09.20		Alexa Leary	Australia	16 May 2025	-	Sydney, Australia	
200 m freestyle	S10	2:08.64		Aurelie Rivard	Canada	7 June 2018	32nd International German Championships	Berlin, Germany	
200 m freestyle	S11	2:22.04		Liesette Bruinsma	Netherlands	11 May 2023	International German Championships	Berlin, Germany	
200 m freestyle	S12	2:10.99		Daria Pikalova	Russia	11 May 2015	-	Seoul, South Korea	
200 m freestyle	S13	2:07.64	†	Rebecca Meyers	United States	12 September 2016	Paralympic Games	Rio de Janeiro, Brazil	
200 m freestyle	S14	2:02.09		Bethany Firth	Great Britain	30 June 2016	-	Glasgow, United Kingdom	

Legend: # – Record awaiting ratification by IPC; e – equalled existing record;
Records not set in finals: h – heat; sf – semifinal; r – relay 1st leg; rh – relay heat 1st leg; b – B final; † – en route to final mark; so – swim-off

== 400 m freestyle ==
Event	Class	Time	Name	Nation	Date	meet	Location	Ref
400 m freestyle	S6	5:04.57	Jiang Yuyan	China	2 September 2021	Paralympic Games	Tokyo, Japan	
400 m freestyle	S7	4:51.50	Morgan Stickney	United States	27 June 2024	USA Para Swim Trials	Minneapolis, United States	
400 m freestyle	S8	4:40.33	Lakeisha Patterson	Australia	8 September 2016	Paralympic Games	Rio de Janeiro, Brazil	
400 m freestyle	S9	4:23.81	Natalie du Toit	South Africa	12 September 2008	Paralympic Games	Beijing, China	
400 m freestyle	S10	4:24.08	Aurélie Rivard	Canada	1 September 2021	Paralympic Games	Tokyo, Japan	
400 m freestyle	S11	4:54.49	Anastasia Pagonis	United States	26 August 2021	Paralympic Games	Tokyo, Japan	
400 m freestyle	S12	4:22.34	Rebecca Meyers	United States	9 September 2019	World Para Championships	London, United Kingdom	
400 m freestyle	S13	4:19.59	Rebecca Meyers	United States	12 September 2016	Paralympic Games	Rio de Janeiro, Brazil	
400 m freestyle	S14	4:27.08	Jessica-Jane Applegate	Great Britain	8 July 2017	31st International German Championships	Berlin, Germany	

Legend: # – Record awaiting ratification by IPC; e – equalled existing record;
Records not set in finals: h – heat; sf – semifinal; r – relay 1st leg; rh – relay heat 1st leg; b – B final; † – en route to final mark; so – swim-off

== 800 m freestyle ==
Event	Class	Time	Name	Nation	Date	meet	Location	Ref
800 m freestyle	S6	10:50.43	Nora Meister	Switzerland	18 December 2022	-	Oberkirch, Switzerland	
800 m freestyle	S7	10:02.54	Morgan Stickney	United States	7 March 2024	-	Greensboro, United States	
800 m freestyle	S8	9:45.08	Jessica Long	United States	16 April 2015	-	Berlin, Germany	
800 m freestyle	S9	8:59.09	Natalie du Toit	South Africa	15 April 2010	South African Nationals	Durban, South Africa	
800 m freestyle	S10	9:18.36	Oliwia Jablonska	Poland	7 July 2017	31st International German Championships	Berlin, Germany	
800 m freestyle	S11	10:57.82	Daniela Schulte	Germany	23 May 2013	27th International IPC German Championships	Berlin, Germany	
800 m freestyle	S12	9:13.31	Rebecca Meyers	United States	12 May 2019	-	Cincinnati, United States	
800 m freestyle	S13	9:29.21	Olivia Chambers	United States	14 December 2024	-	Orlando, United States	
800 m freestyle	S14	9:15.69	Jessica-Jane Applegate	Great Britain	7 July 2017	31st International German Championships	Berlin, Germany	

Legend: # – Record awaiting ratification by IPC; e – equalled existing record;
Records not set in finals: h – heat; sf – semifinal; r – relay 1st leg; rh – relay heat 1st leg; b – B final; † – en route to final mark; so – swim-off

== 1500 m freestyle ==
Event	Class	Time	Name	Nation	Date	meet	Location	Ref
1500 m freestyle	S6	22:06.01	Ellie Marks	United States	17 June 2023	-	Colorado Springs, United States	
1500 m freestyle	S7	19:21.20	Morgan Stickney	United States	15 December 2023	U.S. Para National Championships	Orlando, United States	
1500 m freestyle	S8	19:03.34	Jessica Long	United States	13 September 2015	-	Yucaipa, United States	
1500 m freestyle	S9	17:05.09	Natalie du Toit	South Africa	13 April 2010	-	Durban, South Africa	
1500 m freestyle	S10	18:33.86	Susan Beth Scott	United States	17 May 2009	-	Cincinnati, United States	
1500 m freestyle	S11	21:37.53	Daniela Schulte	Germany	13 July 2008	-	Victoria, Canada	
1500 m freestyle	S12	17:27.36	Rebecca Meyers	United States	12 May 2019	-	Cincinnati, United States	
1500 m freestyle	S13	17:48.60	Rebecca Meyers	United States	14 December 2024	-	Orlando, United States	
1500 m freestyle	S14	17:32.74	Valeriia Shabalina	Russia	17 October 2019	-	Brisbane, Australia	

Legend: # – Record awaiting ratification by IPC; e – equalled existing record;
Records not set in finals: h – heat; sf – semifinal; r – relay 1st leg; rh – relay heat 1st leg; b – B final; † – en route to final mark; so – swim-off

== 50 m backstroke ==
Event	Class	Time		Name	Nation	Date	meet	Location	Ref
50 m backstroke	S1	1:06.53		Ingrid Thunem	Norway	6 May 2016	European Championships	Funchal, Portugal	
50 m backstroke	S2	59.38	†	Yip Pin Xiu	Singapore	10 September 2016	Paralympic Games	Rio de Janeiro, Brazil	
50 m backstroke	S3	48.49		Peng Qiuping	China	10 September 2016	Paralympic Games	Rio de Janeiro, Brazil	
50 m backstroke	S4	42.66		Katie Kubiak	United States	24 September 2025	World Para Championships	Singapore, Singapore	
50 m backstroke	S5	37.18		Lu Dong	China	30 August 2021	Paralympic Games	Tokyo, Japan	
50 m backstroke	S6	37.40	h	Shelby Newkirk	Canada	13 April 2024	Para Swimming World Series	Indianapolis, United States	
50 m backstroke	S7	38.00		Shelby Newkirk	Canada	8 June 2018	International IPC German Championships	Berlin, Germany	
50 m backstroke	S8	32.01		Alice Tai	Great Britain	7 June 2019	International German Championships	Berlin, Germany	
50 m backstroke	S9	32.01		Christie Raleigh-Crossley	United States	12 March 2023	Citi Para Swimming World Series	Lignano Sabbiadoro, Italy	
50 m backstroke	S10	31.67		Summer Mortimer	Netherlands	11 April 2014	-	Eindhoven, Netherlands	
50 m backstroke	S10	31.62	not ratified	Sophie Pascoe	New Zealand	10 April 2014	New Zealand Championships	Auckland, New Zealand	
50 m backstroke	S11	35.09		Tomomi Ishiura	Japan	18 November 2023	-	Saga, Japan	
50 m backstroke	S12	31.61		Hannah Russell	Great Britain	8 June 2018	International German Championships	Berlin, Germany	
50 m backstroke	S13	30.31		Gia Pergolini	United States	15 December 2023	-	Orlando, United States	

Legend: # – Record awaiting ratification by IPC; e – equalled existing record;
Records not set in finals: h – heat; sf – semifinal; r – relay 1st leg; rh – relay heat 1st leg; b – B final; † – en route to final mark; so – swim-off

== 100 m backstroke ==
Event	Class	Time		Name	Nation	Date	Meet	Location	Ref
100 m backstroke	S1	2:25.63		Ingrid Thunem	Norway	15 July 2016	-	Kristiansand, Norway	
100 m backstroke	S2	2:07.09		Yip Pin Xiu	Singapore	10 September 2016	Paralympic Games	Rio de Janeiro, Brazil	
100 m backstroke	S3	1:44.94		Lisette Teunissen	Netherlands	22 November 2015	-	Eindhoven, Netherlands	
100 m backstroke	S4	1:32.72		Katie Kubiak	United States	20 June 2025	-	Boise, United States	
100 m backstroke	S5	1:32.91		Karina Lauridsen	Denmark	27 May 2007	-	Berlin, Germany	
100 m backstroke	S6	1:19.44		Jiang Yuyan	China	7 September 2024	Paralympic Games	Paris, France	
100 m backstroke	S7	1:19.47		Julia Gaffney	United States	4 April 2019	-	Indianapolis, United States	
100 m backstroke	S8	1:08.04		Alice Tai	Great Britain	10 September 2019	World Para Championships	London, United Kingdom	
100 m backstroke	S9	1:07.41		Sophie Pascoe	New Zealand	19 June 2019	-	Auckland, New Zealand	
100 m backstroke	S10	1:05.86	h	Summer Mortimer	Netherlands	16 July 2015	World Championships	Glasgow, Great Britain	
100 m backstroke	S11	1:13.46		Cai Liwen	China	28 August 2021	Paralympic Games	Tokyo, Japan	
100 m backstroke	S12	1:06.06		Hannah Russell	Great Britain	14 September 2016	Paralympic Games	Rio de Janeiro, Brazil	
100 m backstroke	S13	1:04.64		Gia Pergolini	United States	26 August 2021	Paralympic Games	Tokyo, Japan	
100 m backstroke	S14	1:04.02		Bethany Firth	Great Britain	2 July 2026	-	Eindhoven, Netherlands	

Legend: # – Record awaiting ratification by IPC; e – equalled existing record;
Records not set in finals: h – heat; sf – semifinal; r – relay 1st leg; rh – relay heat 1st leg; b – B final; † – en route to final mark; so – swim-off

== 200 m backstroke ==
Event	Class	Time	Name	Nation	Date	meet	Location	Ref
200 m backstroke	S6	2:50.65	Nora Meister	Switzerland	17 June 2021	International German Championships	Berlin, Germany	
200 m backstroke	S7	2:50.38	Julia Gaffney	United States	16 July 2022	-	Colorado Springs, United States	
200 m backstroke	S8	2:31.04	Alice Tai	Great Britain	6 June 2019	International German Championships	Berlin, Germany	
200 m backstroke	S9	2:28.29	Stéphanie Dixon	Canada	23 July 2005	-	Winnipeg, Canada	
200 m backstroke	S10	2:23.92	Summer Mortimer	Canada	10 December 2010	-	Toronto, Canada	
200 m backstroke	S11	2:50.88	Daniela Schulte	Germany	30 June 2012	26th International IPC German Championships	Berlin, Germany	
200 m backstroke	S12	2:31.13	Trischa Zorn	United States	8 September 1992	Paralympic Games	Barcelona, Spain	
200 m backstroke	S13	2:25.23	Roisin Ni Riain	Ireland	11 May 2023	International German Championships	Berlin, Germany	
200 m backstroke	S14	2:24.65	Marlou van der Kulk	Netherlands	22 November 2015	-	Eindhoven, Netherlands	

Legend: # – Record awaiting ratification by IPC; e – equalled existing record;
Records not set in finals: h – heat; sf – semifinal; r – relay 1st leg; rh – relay heat 1st leg; b – B final; † – en route to final mark; so – swim-off

== 50 m breaststroke ==
Event	Class	Time		Name	Nation	Date	meet	Location	Ref
50 m breaststroke	SB1	1:21.10		Ingrid Thunem	Norway	19 July 2014	-	Drammen, Norway	
50 m breaststroke	SB2	56.44		Tanja Scholz	Germany	7 September 2026	-	İzmit, Turkey	
50 m breaststroke	SB3	52.65		Cheng Jiao	China	5 December 2017	World Para Championships	Mexico City, Mexico	
50 m breaststroke	SB4	48.05		Sarah Louise Rung	Norway	8 March 2014	-	Esbjerg, Denmark	
50 m breaststroke	SB5	43.48	†	Kirsten Bruhn	Germany	5 September 2012	Paralympic Games	London, Great Britain	
50 m breaststroke	SB6	43.06		Tiffany Thomas Kane	Australia	9 April 2016	Australian Championships	Adelaide, Australia	
50 m breaststroke	SB7	38.35		Iona Winnifrith	Great Britain	5 July 2026	-	Eindhoven, Netherlands	
50 m breaststroke	SB8	34.12		Brock Whiston	Great Britain	8 June 2019	International German Championships	Berlin, Germany	
50 m breaststroke	SB9	32.21		Chantalle Zijderveld	Netherlands	3 December 2020	-	Rotterdam, Netherlands	
50 m breaststroke	SB11	36.13		Karolina Pelendritou	Cyprus	19 June 2021	International German Championships	Berlin, Germany	
50 m breaststroke	SB12	33.50		Elena Semechin	Germany	2 February 2024	Para Swimming World Series	Aberdeen, United Kingdom	
50 m breaststroke	SB13	33.70	†	Rebecca Redfern	Great Britain	1 September 2021	Paralympic Games	Tokyo, Japan	
50 m breaststroke	SB14	33.94	†, not ratified	Michelle Alonso Morales	Spain	23 April 2016	British Para-Swimming International Meet	Glasgow, Great Britain	

Legend: # – Record awaiting ratification by IPC; e – equalled existing record;
Records not set in finals: h – heat; sf – semifinal; r – relay 1st leg; rh – relay heat 1st leg; b – B final; † – en route to final mark; so – swim-off

== 100 m breaststroke ==
Event	Class	Time		Name	Nation	Date	meet	Location	Ref
100 m breaststroke	SB1	3:19.81		Ingrid Thunem	Norway	5 June 2015	-	Kristiansand, Norway	
100 m breaststroke	SB2	2:45.02		Jennie Ekstrom	Sweden	1 May 2011	-	Berlin, Germany	
100 m breaststroke	SB3	2:07.39		Marta Fernandez Infante	Spain	31 March 2022	-	Berlin, Germany	
100 m breaststroke	SB4	1:40.63		Alessandra Dos Santos	Brazil	29 August 2026	-	Walnut, United States	
100 m breaststroke	SB5	1:33.85	h	Kirsten Bruhn	Germany	16 Aug 2010	World Championships	Eindhoven, Netherlands	
100 m breaststroke	SB6	1:29.87		Liu Daomin	China	15 September 2019	World Para Championships	London, Great Britain	
100 m breaststroke	SB7	1:24.51		Mariia Pavlova	Russia	23 September 2025	World Para Championships	Singapore, Singapore	
100 m breaststroke	SB8	1:13.83		Brock Whiston	Great Britain	15 September 2019	World Para Championships	London, Great Britain	
100 m breaststroke	SB9	1:10.99		Chantalle Zijderveld	Netherlands	26 August 2021	Paralympic Games	Tokyo, Japan	
100 m breaststroke	SB11	1:17.65		Daria Lukianenko	Russia	23 April 2024	World Para European Open Championships	Funchal, Portugal	
100 m breaststroke	SB12	1:12.54		Elena Krawzow	Germany	5 September 2024	2024 Games	Paris, France	
100 m breaststroke	SB13	1:09.57		Fotimakhon Amilova	Uzbekistan	11 October 2018	Asian Para Games	Jakarta, Indonesia	
100 m breaststroke	SB14	1:11.52		Beatriz de Araujo Flausino	Brazil	7 May 2026	International German Championships	Berlin, Germany	

Legend: # – Record awaiting ratification by IPC; e – equalled existing record;
Records not set in finals: h – heat; sf – semifinal; r – relay 1st leg; rh – relay heat 1st leg; b – B final; † – en route to final mark; so – swim-off

== 200 m breaststroke ==
Event	Class	Time	Name	Nation	Date	meet	Location	Ref
200 m breaststroke	SB4	3:45.70	Sarah Louise Rung	Norway	8 June 2014	-	Kristiansand, Norway	
200 m breaststroke	SB5	3:23.12	Kirsten Bruhn	Germany	31 May 2009	-	Berlin, Germany	
200 m breaststroke	SB6	3:20.58	Ng Cheuk-yan	Hong Kong	14 May 2023	International German Championships	Berlin, Germany	
200 m breaststroke	SB7	3:12.72	Ellie Marks	United States	3 June 2017	-	Colorado Springs, United States	
200 m breaststroke	SB8	2:53.89	Sisse Egeborg	Denmark	28 June 2003	-	Gladsaxe, Denmark	
200 m breaststroke	SB9	2:42.65	Chantalle Zijderveld	Netherlands	14 May 2023	International German Championships	Berlin, Germany	
200 m breaststroke	SB11	3:06.69	Liesette Bruinsma	Netherlands	22 June 2018	-	Amersfoort, Netherlands	
200 m breaststroke	SB12	2:38.69	Elena Krawzow	Germany	9 June 2019	International German Championships	Berlin, Germany	
200 m breaststroke	SB13	2:44.13	Elena Krawzow	Germany	20 June 2021	International German Championships	Berlin, Germany	
200 m breaststroke	SB14	2:42.45	Louise Fiddes	Great Britain	10 June 2018	-	Berlin, Germany	

Legend: # – Record awaiting ratification by IPC; e – equalled existing record;
Records not set in finals: h – heat; sf – semifinal; r – relay 1st leg; rh – relay heat 1st leg; b – B final; † – en route to final mark; so – swim-off

== 50 m butterfly ==
Event	Class	Time	Name	Nation	Date	Meet	Location	Ref
50 m butterfly	S1	51.13	Ingrid Thunem	Norway	17 July 2016	-	Kristiansand, Norway	
50 m butterfly	S2	58.27	Ingrid Thunem	Norway	7 July 2015	–	Bergen, Norway	
50 m butterfly	S3	45.49	Marta Fernández Infante	Spain	10 February 2024	-	Barcelona, Spain	
50 m butterfly	S4	38.96	Katie Kubiak	United States	20 June 2025	U.S. Paralympics Championships	Boise, United States	
50 m butterfly	S5	38.17	Lu Dong	China	6 September 2024	Paralympic Games	Paris, France	
50 m butterfly	S6	34.55	Jiang Yuyan	China	6 August 2023	-	Manchester, United Kingdom	
50 m butterfly	S7	32.99	Danielle Dorris	Canada	3 September 2021	Paralympic Games	Tokyo, Japan	
50 m butterfly	S8	30.62	Alice Tai	Great Britain	9 June 2019	International German Championships	Berlin, Germany	
50 m butterfly	S9	28.15	Sophie Pascoe	New Zealand	17 February 2019	-	Melbourne, Australia	
50 m butterfly	S10	28.38	Sophie Pascoe	New Zealand	19 March 2013	State New Zealand Open Championships	Auckland, New Zealand	
50 m butterfly	S11	32.92	Mary Fisher	New Zealand	1 April 2016	–	Auckland, New Zealand	
50 m butterfly	S12	29.19	Carol Santiago	Brazil	18 March 2023	-	Sheffield, United Kingdom	
50 m butterfly	S13	27.98	Carlotta Gilli	Italy	9 July 2017	31st International German Championships	Berlin, Germany	

Legend: # – Record awaiting ratification by IPC; e – equalled existing record;
Records not set in finals: h – heat; sf – semifinal; r – relay 1st leg; rh – relay heat 1st leg; b – B final; † – en route to final mark; so – swim-off

== 100 m butterfly ==
Event	Class	Time		Name	Nation	Date	Meet	Location	Ref
100m butterfly	S5	1:44.55	h	Réka Kézdi	Hungary	16 April 2015	29th International German Championships	Berlin, Germany	
100m butterfly	S6	1:26.08		Verena Schott	Germany	2 December 2022	-	Rotterdam, Netherlands	
100m butterfly	S7	1:18.65		Nikita Howarth	New Zealand	9 June 2016	30th International German Championships	Berlin, Germany	
100m butterfly	S8	1:08.20		Stephanie Slater	Great Britain	6 August 2014	European Championships	Eindhoven, Netherlands	
100m butterfly	S9	1:02.48		Sophie Pascoe	New Zealand	20 June 2019	-	Auckland, New Zealand	
100m butterfly	S10	1:02.60		Sophie Pascoe	New Zealand	31 March 2016	New Zealand Open	Auckland, New Zealand	
100m butterfly	S11	1:15.17		Mary Fisher	New Zealand	22 March 2013	State New Zealand Open Championships	Auckland, New Zealand	
100m butterfly	S12	1:03.11		Joanna Mendak	Poland	2 June 2006	-	Berlin, Germany	
100m butterfly	S13	1:02.64		Carlotta Gilli	Italy	3 December 2017	IPC Championships	Mexico City, Mexico	
100m butterfly	S14	1:03.59		Valeriia Shabalina	Russia	25 August 2021	Paralympic Games	Tokyo, Japan	

Legend: # – Record awaiting ratification by IPC; e – equalled existing record;
Records not set in finals: h – heat; sf – semifinal; r – relay 1st leg; rh – relay heat 1st leg; b – B final; † – en route to final mark; so – swim-off

== 200 m butterfly ==
Event	Class	Time	Name	Nation	Date	Meet	Location	Ref
200 m butterfly	S8	2:47.36	Jessica Long	United States	2 Oct 2010	-	Santa Clara, United States	
200m butterfly	S9	2:30.46	Toni Shaw	Great Britain	8 June 2019	International German Championships	Berlin, Germany	
200 m butterfly	S10	2:34.01	Gemma Dashwood	Australia	5 Oct 1997	-	Melbourne, Australia	
200 m butterfly	S11	2:50.93	Mary Fisher	New Zealand	20 March 2013	State New Zealand Open Championships	Auckland, New Zealand	
200 m butterfly	S12	2:46.53	Carla Casals	Spain	30 June 2012	26th International IPC German Championships	Berlin, Germany	
200 m butterfly	S13	2:31.88	Rhiannon Henry	Great Britain	15 Jul 2005	-	Portland, OR, United States	

Legend: # – Record awaiting ratification by IPC; e – equalled existing record;
Records not set in finals: h – heat; sf – semifinal; r – relay 1st leg; rh – relay heat 1st leg; b – B final; † – en route to final mark; so – swim-off

== 150 m individual medley ==
Event	Class	Time		Name	Nation	Date	Meet	Location	Ref
150 m individual medley	SM1	3:45.84	h	Ingrid Thunem	Norway	26 April 2014	28th International German Championships	Berlin, Germany	
150 m individual medley	SM2	5:00.16	h	Zsanett Adami	Hungary	26 April 2014	28th International German Championships	Berlin, Germany	
150 m individual medley	SM3	2:54.14		Olga Sviderska	Ukraine	12 September 2016	Paralympic Games	Rio de Janeiro, Brazil	
150 m individual medley	SM4	2:41.52		Monica Boggioni	Italy	7 December 2017	IPC Championships	Mexico City, Mexico	

Legend: # – Record awaiting ratification by IPC; e – equalled existing record;
Records not set in finals: h – heat; sf – semifinal; r – relay 1st leg; rh – relay heat 1st leg; b – B final; † – en route to final mark; so – swim-off

== 200 m individual medley ==
Event	Class	Time		Name	Nation	Date	Meet	Location	Ref
200 m individual medley	SM3	4:56.49		Karen Breumsoe	Denmark	6 December 2003	-	Esbjerg, Denmark	
200 m individual medley	SM4	4:06.86	b	Gina Böttcher	Germany	20 June 2021	International German Championships	Berlin, Germany	
200 m individual medley	SM5	3:13.43		Nataliia Prologaieva	Ukraine	31 August 2012	Paralympic Games	London, Great Britain	
200 m individual medley	SM6	2:57.24		Maisie Summers-Newton	Great Britain	11 September 2019	World Para Championships	London, United Kingdom	
200 m individual medley	SM7	2:48.43		Mallory Weggemann	United States	18 Aug 2010	World Championships	Eindhoven, Netherlands	
200 m individual medley	SM8	2:35.30		Brock Whiston	Great Britain	14 September 2019	World Para Championships	London, Great Britain	
200 m individual medley	SM9	2:27.83		Natalie du Toit	South Africa	11 Sep 2008	Paralympic Games	Beijing, China	
200 m individual medley	SM10	2:24.90		Sophie Pascoe	New Zealand	11 September 2016	Paralympic Games	Rio de Janeiro, Brazil	
200 m individual medley	SM11	2:40.10		Ma Jia	China	3 August 2023	World Para Championships	Manchester, United Kingdom	
200 m individual medley	SM11	2:38.47	'#'	Daria Lukianenko	Russia	24 April 2024	World Para European Open Championships	Funchal, Portugal	
200 m individual medley	SM12	2:24.56		Rebecca Meyers	United States	13 September 2019	World Para Championships	London, United Kingdom	
200 m individual medley	SM13	2:21.44		Carlotta Gilli	Italy	30 August 2021	Paralympic Games	Tokyo, Japan	
200 m individual medley	SM14	2:18.37		Valeriia Shabalina	Russia	7 May 2016	European Championships	Funchal, Portugal	

Legend: # – Record awaiting ratification by IPC; e – equalled existing record;
Records not set in finals: h – heat; sf – semifinal; r – relay 1st leg; rh – relay heat 1st leg; b – B final; † – en route to final mark; so – swim-off

== 400m individual medley ==
Event	Class	Time	Name	Nation	Date	Meet	Location	Ref
400m individual medley	SM6	7:09.65	Miranda Uhl	United States	11 Jul 2008	-	Victoria, BC, Canada	
400m individual medley	SM7	7:34.74	Deborah Gruen	United States	19 Mar 2009	-	Gresham, OR, United States	
400m individual medley	SM8	5:38.73	Jessica Long	United States	17 April 2015	29th International German Championships	Berlin, Germany	
400m individual medley	SM9	5:23.91	Amy Marren	Great Britain	25 April 2014	28th International German Championships	Berlin, Germany	
400m individual medley	SM10	5:17.79	Bianka Pap	Hungary	17 June 2021	International German Championships	Berlin, Germany	
400m individual medley	SM11	6:06.35	Daniela Schulte	Germany	9 June 2016	30th International German Championships	Berlin, Germany	
400m individual medley	SM12	5:29.62	Trischa Zorn	United States	17 Jul 1990	-	Drachten, Netherlands	
400m individual medley	SM13	5:29.92	Valérie Grand'Maison	Canada	24 May 2007	-	Berlin, Germany	
400m individual medley	SM14	5:13.91	Jessica-Jane Applegate	Great Britain	6 July 2017	31st International German Championships	Berlin, Germany	

Legend: # – Record awaiting ratification by IPC; e – equalled existing record;
Records not set in finals: h – heat; sf – semifinal; r – relay 1st leg; rh – relay heat 1st leg; b – B final; † – en route to final mark; so – swim-off

== Freestyle relays ==
Event	Class	Time	Name	Nation	Date	Meet	Location	Ref
4×50 m freestyle relay	20 points	2:37.16	Viktoriia Savtsova; Olga Sviderska; Nataliia Prologaieva; Ani Palian	Ukraine	14 August 2013	World Championships	Montreal, Canada	
4×50 m freestyle relay	S11–13	2:19.66	Tonia Valetta; Donna Brown; Michelle Hudson; Trischa Zorn	United States	15 Jul 1990	-	Assen, Netherlands	
4×100 m freestyle relay	34 points	4:16.65	Ellie Cole (S9) (1:02.92); Lakeisha Patterson (S8) (1:04.96); Maddison Elliott (S8) (1:05.10); Ashleigh McConnell (S9) (1:03.67)	Australia	15 September 2016	Paralympic Games	Rio de Janeiro, Brazil	
4×100 m freestyle relay	40 points	4:53.06	Beata Drozdowska; Katarzyna Brzostowska; Magdalena Szczepinska; Malgorzata Kozlowska	Poland	28 May 2000	-	Oświęcim, Poland	
4×100 m freestyle relay	49 points	4:33.62	Melanie Easter; Jenny Couglin; Elaine Barrett; Rhiannon Henry	Great Britain	10 Dec 2002	-	Mar del Plata, Argentina	
4×100 m freestyle relay	S11–13	4:33.52	Daniela Schulte; Birgit Beeker; Daniela Henke; Yvonne Hopf	Germany	22 Aug 1996	Paralympic Games	Atlanta, United States	

Legend: # – Record awaiting ratification by IPC; e – equalled existing record;
Records not set in finals: h – heat; sf – semifinal; r – relay 1st leg; rh – relay heat 1st leg; b – B final; † – en route to final mark; so – swim-off

== Medley relays ==
Event	Class	Time	Name	Nation	Date	Meet	Location	Ref
4×50m medley relay	20 points	2:57.35	Oksana Khrul; Nataliia Prologaieva; Olena Fedota; Olga Sviderska	Ukraine	16 August 2013	World Championships	Montreal, Canada	
4×50m medley relay	S11–13	2:37.17	Tonia Valetta; Donna Brown; Michelle Hudson; Trischa Zorn	United States	23 July 1990	-	Assen, Netherlands	
4×100m medley relay	34 points	4:36.31	Alice Tai (S8) (1:09.28); Brock Whiston (S8) (1:13.82); Toni Shaw (S9) (1:08.12); Stephanie Millward (S9) (1:05.09)	Great Britain	13 September 2019	World Para Championships	London, United Kingdom	
4×100m medley relay	49 points	5:07.00	Melanie Easter; Jenny Coughlin; Elaine Barrett; Rhiannon Henry	Great Britain	13 December 2002	-	Mar del Plata, Argentina	
4×100m medley relay	S11–13	5:11.58	Daniela Schulte; Birgit Beeker; Yvonne Hopf; Daniela Henke	Germany	25 Aug 1996	Paralympic Games	Atlanta, United States	

Legend: # – Record awaiting ratification by IPC; e – equalled existing record;
Records not set in finals: h – heat; sf – semifinal; r – relay 1st leg; rh – relay heat 1st leg; b – B final; † – en route to final mark; so – swim-off

== See also ==
- List of IPC world records in swimming – Men's long course
- List of IPC world records in swimming – Men's short course
- List of IPC world records in swimming – Women's short course
