= Swimming at the 2020 Summer Paralympics – Women's 100 metre breaststroke =

The Women's 100 metre breaststroke swimming events for the 2020 Summer Paralympics took place at the Tokyo Aquatics Centre from 26 August to 1 September 2021. A total of ten events were contested over this distance.

== Schedule ==
H	Heats	½	Semifinals	F	Final

Date	Thu 26		Fri 27		Sat 28		Sun 29		Mon 30		Tue 31		Wed 1	
Event	M	E	M	E	M	E	M	E	M	E	M	E	M	E
SB4 100m							H	F						
SB5 100m					H	F								
SB6 100m					H	F								
SB7 100m													H	F
SB8 100m	H	F												
SB9 100m	H	F												
SB11 100m													H	F
SB12 100m													H	F
SB13 100m													H	F
SB14 100m							H	F						

== Medal summary ==
The following is a summary of the medals awarded across all 100 metre breaststroke events.

Classification	Gold		Silver		Bronze	
SB4	Fanni Illés; Hungary	1:44.41	Giulia Ghiretti; Italy	1:50.36	Yao Cuan; China	1:50.77
SB5	Yelyzaveta Mereshko; Ukraine	1:40.59	Grace Harvey; Great Britain	1:42.22	Verena Schott; Germany	1:43.61
SB6	Maisie Summers-Newton; Great Britain	1:32.34	Liu Daomin; China	1:33.30	Sophia Herzog; United States	1:36.06
SB7	Mariia Pavlova; RPC	1:31.44	Jessica Long; United States	1:34.82	Tiffany Thomas Kane; Australia	1:35.02
SB8	Ellen Keane; Ireland	1:19.93	Sophie Pascoe; New Zealand	1:20.32	Adelina Razetdinova; RPC	1:24.77
SB9	Chantalle Zijderveld; Netherlands	1:10.99 WR	Lisa Kruger; Netherlands	1:13.91	Keira Stephens; Australia	1:17.59
SB11	Karolina Pelendritou; Cyprus	1:19.78 WR	Ma Jia; China	1:19.82	Yana Berezhna; Ukraine	1:27.02
SB12	Maria Carolina Gomes Santiago; Brazil	1:14.89	Daria Lukianenko; RPC	1:17.55	Yaryna Matlo; Ukraine	1:20.31
SB13	Elena Krawzow; Germany	1:13.46	Rebecca Redfern; Great Britain	1:14.10	Colleen Young; United States	1:15.69
SB14	Michelle Alonso; Spain	1:12.02 WR	Louise Fiddes; Great Britain	1:15.93	Beatriz Carneiro; Brazil	1:17.61

== Results ==
The following were the results of the finals only of each of the Women's 100 metre breaststroke events in each of the classifications. Further details of each event, including where appropriate heats and semi finals results, are available on that event's dedicated page.

=== SB4 ===
The SB4 category is for swimmers who have hemiplegia, paraplegia or short stature.

The final in this classification took place on 29 August 2021:

Rank	Lane	Name	Nationality	Time	Notes
1st place, gold medalist(s)	4	Fanni Illés	Hungary	1:44.41	
2nd place, silver medalist(s)	6	Giulia Ghiretti	Italy	1:50.36	
3rd place, bronze medalist(s)	3	Yao Cuan	China	1:50.77	
4	2	Zhang Li	China	1:51.96	
5	5	Cheng Jiao	China	1:52.17	
6	7	Monica Boggioni	Italy	1:58.28	
7	1	Natalia Shavel	Belarus	2:02.58	
8	8	Malak Abdelshafi	Egypt	2:14.68	

=== SB5 ===
The SB5 category is for swimmers who have short stature, arm amputations, or some form of coordination problem on one side of their body.

The final in this classification took place on 28 August 2021:

Rank	Lane	Name	Nationality	Time	Notes
1st place, gold medalist(s)	5	Yelyzaveta Mereshko	Ukraine	1:40.59	
2nd place, silver medalist(s)	4	Grace Harvey	Great Britain	1:42.22	
3rd place, bronze medalist(s)	2	Verena Schott	Germany	1:43.61	
4	7	Song Lingling	China	1:43.73	
5	3	Arianna Talamona	Italy	1:43.83	
6	6	Sarah Louise Rung	Norway	1:44.39	
7	1	Trịnh Thị Bích Như	Vietnam	1:53.00	
8	8	Thelma Björg Björnsdóttir	Iceland	1:54.88	

=== SB6 ===
The SB6 category is for swimmers who have one leg and one arm amputation on opposite side, or paralysis on one side of their body. These swimmers have full control of their arms and trunk but variable function in their legs.

The final in this classification took place on 28 August 2021:

Rank	Lane	Name	Nationality	Time	Notes
1st place, gold medalist(s)	4	Maisie Summers-Newton	Great Britain	1:32.34	PR, ER
2nd place, silver medalist(s)	5	Liu Daomin	China	1:33.30	
3rd place, bronze medalist(s)	3	Sophia Herzog	United States	1:36.06	
4	6	Eleanor Simmonds	Great Britain	1:39.94	
5	1	Viktoriia Savtsova	Ukraine	1:40.49	
6	7	Evelin Száraz	Hungary	1:41.19	
7	2	Nicole Turner	Ireland	1:41.63	
8	8	Camille Bérubé	Canada	1:44.07	

=== SB7 ===
The SB7 category is for swimmers who have a single amputation, or restrictive movement in their hip, knee and ankle joints.

The final in this classification took place on 1 September 2021:

Rank	Lane	Name	Nationality	Time	Notes
1st place, gold medalist(s)	4	Mariia Pavlova	RPC	1:31.44	
2nd place, silver medalist(s)	6	Jessica Long	United States	1:34.82	
3rd place, bronze medalist(s)	5	Tiffany Thomas Kane	Australia	1:35.02	
4	3	Nikita Howarth	New Zealand	1:36.65	
5	2	Naomi Somellera Mandujano	Mexico	1:39.41	
6	7	Gisell Natalia Prada Pachón	Colombia	1:41.11	
7	1	Vendula Dušková	Czech Republic	1:42.69	
8	8	Amalie Vinther	Denmark	1:47.84	

=== SB8 ===
The SB8 category is for swimmers who have joint restrictions in one leg, or double below-the-knee amputations.

The final in this classification took place on 26 August 2021:

Rank	Lane	Name	Nationality	Time	Notes
1st place, gold medalist(s)	4	Ellen Keane	Ireland	1:19.93	
2nd place, silver medalist(s)	5	Sophie Pascoe	New Zealand	1:20.32	
3rd place, bronze medalist(s)	3	Adelina Razetdinova	RPC	1:24.77	
4	2	Katarina Roxon	Canada	1:25.73	
5	6	Núria Marquès Soto	Spain	1:26.53	
6	7	Mikuni Utsugi	Japan	1:28.59	
7	8	Elena Kliachkina	RPC	1:29.72	
8	1	Efthymia Gkouli	Greece	1:31.57	

=== SB9 ===
The SB9 category is for swimmers who have minor physical impairments, for example, loss of one hand.

The final in this classification took place on 26 August 2021:

Rank	Lane	Name	Nationality	Time	Notes
1st place, gold medalist(s)	4	Chantalle Zijderveld	Netherlands	1:10.99	WR
2nd place, silver medalist(s)	5	Lisa Kruger	Netherlands	1:13.91	
3rd place, bronze medalist(s)	6	Keira Stephens	Australia	1:17.59	
4	3	Daniela Giménez	Argentina	1:18.70	
5	7	Sarai Gascón Moreno	Spain	1:19.93	
6	2	Zhang Meng	China	1:20.02	
7	1	Bianka Pap	Hungary	1:22.00	
8	8	Mikaela Jenkins	United States	1:23.89	

=== SB11 ===
The SB11 category is for swimmers who have severe visual impairments and have very low or no light perception, such as blindness, they are required to wear blackened goggles to compete. They use tappers when competing in swimming events.

The final in this classification took place on 1 September 2021:

Rank	Lane	Name	Nationality	Time	Notes
1st place, gold medalist(s)	5	Karolina Pelendritou	Cyprus	1:19.78	WR
2nd place, silver medalist(s)	4	Ma Jia	China	1:19.82	
3rd place, bronze medalist(s)	6	Yana Berezhna	Ukraine	1:27.02	
4	3	Liesette Bruinsma	Netherlands	1:27.29	
5	2	Nadia Báez	Argentina	1:30.77	
6	7	Cai Liwen	China	1:30.97	
7	1	Sofiia Polikarpova	RPC	1:32.84	
8	8	Martina Rabbolini	Italy	1:34.29	

=== SB12 ===
The SB12 category is for swimmers who have moderate visual impairment and have a visual field of less than 5 degrees radius. They are required to wear blackened goggles to compete. They may wish to use a tapper.

The final in this classification took place on 1 September 2021:

Rank	Lane	Name	Nationality	Time	Notes
1st place, gold medalist(s)	4	Maria Carolina Gomes Santiago	Brazil	1:14.89	PR
2nd place, silver medalist(s)	5	Daria Lukianenko	RPC	1:17.55	
3rd place, bronze medalist(s)	3	Yaryna Matlo	Ukraine	1:20.31	
4	6	Sophie Jin Wen Soon	Singapore	1:29.52	
5	1	Lucilene da Silva Sousa	Brazil	1:30.25	
6	2	Belkis Dayanara Mota Echarry	Venezuela	1:30.37	
7	7	Aliya Rakhimbekova	Kazakhstan	1:31.31	

=== SB13 ===
The SB13 category is for swimmers who have minor visual impairment and have high visual acuity. They are required to wear blackened goggles to compete. They may wish to use a tapper.

The final in this classification took place on 1 September 2021:

Rank	Lane	Name	Nationality	Time	Notes
1st place, gold medalist(s)	4	Elena Krawzow	Germany	1:13.46	ER
2nd place, silver medalist(s)	5	Rebecca Redfern	Great Britain	1:14.10	
3rd place, bronze medalist(s)	3	Colleen Young	United States	1:15.69	AM
4	7	Mariia Latritskaia	RPC	1:17.59	
5	6	Anastasiya Zudzilava	Belarus	1:19.77	
6	1	Shokhsanamkhon Toshpulatova	Uzbekistan	1:19.99	
7	2	Róisín Ní Riain	Ireland	1:20.34	
8	8	Marlene Endrolath	Germany	1:20.79	

=== SB14 ===
The SB14 category is for swimmers who have an intellectual impairment.

The final in this classification took place on 29 August 2021:

Rank	Lane	Name	Nationality	Time	Notes
1st place, gold medalist(s)	4	Michelle Alonso Morales	Spain	1:12.02	WR
2nd place, silver medalist(s)	7	Louise Fiddes	Great Britain	1:15.93	
3rd place, bronze medalist(s)	3	Beatriz Borges Carneiro	Brazil	1:17.61	
4	2	Débora Borges Carneiro	Brazil	1:17.63	
5	6	Ashley van Rijswijk	Australia	1:17.84	
6	5	Paige Leonhardt	Australia	1:17.90	
7	1	Mikika Serizawa	Japan	1:20.09	
8	8	Pernilla Lindberg	Sweden	1:21.56	
