= 2025 World Para Swimming Championships – Women's 100 metre breaststroke =

The women's 100 metre breaststroke events at the 2025 World Para Swimming Championships were held at the Singapore Aquatic Centre between 21 and 27 September 2025.

== Schedule ==
The 100 metre breaststroke events for women will be held across the following schedule:

women's 100 metre breaststroke
Day	Date	Classifications
Day 1	21 Sept	SB9; SB4
Day 2	22 Sept	SB13
Day 3	23 Sept	SB7; SB11; SB14
Day 4	24 Spt	SB12
Day 5	25 Sept	SB5
Day 6	26 Sept	SB6; SB8
Day 7	27 Sept	

== Medal summary ==
Event	Gold	Silver	Bronze
SB4	Alessandra Oliveira dos Santos; Brazil	Giulia Ghiretti; Italy	Berta García Grau; Spain
SB5	Grace Harvey; Great Britain	Anna Hontar; Ukraine	Laila Suzigan; Brazil
SB6	Liu Daomin; China	He Shenggao; China	Veronika Korzhova; Ukraine
SB7	Mariia Pavlova; Individual Neutral Athletes	Iona Winnifrith; Great Britain	Nahia Zudaire Borrezo; Spain
SB8	Anastasiya Dmytriv; Spain	Brock Whiston; Great Britain	Elena Kliachkina; Individual Neutral Athletes
SB9	Lisa Kruger; Netherlands	Gabriella Smith; New Zealand	Elizaveta Sidorenko; Individual Neutral Athletes
SB11	Daria Lukianenko; Individual Neutral Athletes	Karolina Pelendritou; Cyprus	Ma Jia; China
SB12	Mariia Latritskaia; Individual Neutral Athletes	Astrid Carroll; Great Britain	Zheng Jietong; China
SB13	Olivia Chambers; United States	Róisín Ní Ríain; Ireland	Anastasiya Zudzilava; Individual Neutral Athletes
SB14	Beatriz de Araújo Flausino; Brazil	Débora Carneiro; Brazil	Olivia Newman-Baronius; Great Britain

== Race summaries ==
=== SB4 ===
The women's 100 metre breaststroke SB4 event will be held on 21 September. 7 swimmers will take part in a direct final.

The relevant records at the beginning of the event were as follows:

Record	Athlete	Time	City	Country
World	Sarah Louise Rung (NOR)	1:43.87	Drammen	Norway
Championship	Sarah Louise Rung (NOR)	1:44.83	Glasgow	United Kingdom
African	Ayaallah Tewfick (EGY)	02:07.6	Berlin	Germany
Americas	Alessandra Oliveira dos Santos (BRA)	01:44.3	São Paulo	Brazil
Asian	Cheng Jiao (CHN)	01:47.8	Tokyo	Japan
European	Sarah Louise Rung (NOR)	01:43.9	Drammen	Norway
Oceania	Jenny Newstead (NZL)	01:55.5	Atlanta	United States

==== Final ====
Rank	Lane	Athlete	Time	Note
1st place, gold medalist(s)	5	Alessandra Oliveira dos Santos (BRA)	1:43.21	WR
2nd place, silver medalist(s)	4	Giulia Ghiretti (ITA)	1:52.47	
3rd place, bronze medalist(s)	3	Berta García Grau (ESP)	1:56.23	
4	2	Natalie Ornkvist (FIN)	1:58.81	
5	6	Natalia Pavliukova (AIN)	2:01.05	
6	7	Malak Abdelshafi (EGY)	2:05.66	
7	1	Dunia Felices (PER)	2:20.24	

=== SB5 ===
The women's 100 metre breaststroke SB5 event will be held on 25 September. 7 swimmers will take part in a direct final.

The relevant records at the beginning of the event were as follows:

Record	Athlete	Time	City	Country
World	Kirsten Bruhn (GER)	1:33.85	Eindhoven	Netherlands
Championship	Kirsten Bruhn (GER)	1:33.85	Eindhoven	Netherlands
African	Ayaallah Tewfick (EGY)	02:01.9	Funchal	Portugal
Americas	Laila Suzigan (BRA)	01:48.8	São Paulo	Brazil
Asian	Zhang Li (CHN)	01:43.2	Paris	France
European	Kirsten Bruhn (GER)	01:33.9	Eindhoven	Netherlands
Oceania	Isabella Vincent (AUS)	02:03.7	Funchal	Portugal

==== Final ====
Rank	Lane	Athlete	Class	Result	Notes
1st place, gold medalist(s)	4	Grace Harvey (GBR)	SB5	1:42.88	
2nd place, silver medalist(s)	5	Anna Hontar (UKR)	SB5	1:46.78	
3rd place, bronze medalist(s)	6	Laila Suzigan (BRA)	SB5	1:48.14	AM
4	3	Verena Schott (GER)	SB5	1:48.76	
5	2	Thelma Bjorg Bjornsdottir (ISL)	SB5	2:00.29	
6	7	Shelby Newkirk (CAN)	SB5	2:01.47	
7	1	Ayaallah Tewfick (EGY)	SB5	2:05.31	

=== SB6 ===
The women's 100 metre breaststroke SB6 event was held on 26 September. Eight swimmers took part in a direct final.

The relevant records at the beginning of the event were as follows:

Record	Athlete	Time	City	Country
World	Liu Daomin (CHN)	1:29.87	London	United Kingdom
Championship	Liu Daomin (CHN)	1:29.87	London	United Kingdom
African	Ann Wacuka (KEN)	03:22.6	NAIROBI	Kenya
Americas	Sophia Herzog (USA)	01:35.5	Tokyo	Japan
Asian	Liu Daomin (CHN)	01:29.9	London	United Kingdom
European	Maisie Summers-Newton (GBR)	01:31.3	Paris	France
Oceania	Tiffany Thomas Kane (AUS)	01:35.0	Glasgow	United Kingdom

==== Final ====
Rank	Lane	Athlete	Class	Result	Notes
1st place, gold medalist(s)	4	Liu Daomin (CHN)	SB6	1:35.10	
2nd place, silver medalist(s)	5	He Shenggao (CHN)	SB6	1:37.69	
3rd place, bronze medalist(s)	3	Veronika Korzhova (UKR)	SB6	1:38.61	
4	6	Evelin Szaraz (HUN)	SB6	1:41.23	
5	2	Chen Shuling (CHN)	SB6	1:42.29	
6	7	Ahalya Lettenberger (USA)	SB6	1:46.24	
7	1	Dearbhaile Brady (IRL)	SB6	1:49.24	
8	8	Alejandra Aybar (DOM)	SB6	1:52.87	

=== SB7 ===
The women's 100 metre breaststroke SB7 event will be held on 23 September. Seven swimmers will take part in a direct final.

The relevant records at the beginning of the event were as follows:

Record	Athlete	Time	City	Country
World	Mariia Pavlova (IPC)	1:26.09	Paris	France
Championship	Tiffany Thomas Kane (AUS)	1:30.36	London	United Kingdom
Americas	Ellie Marks (USA)	01:28.1	Rio de Janeiro	Brazil
Asian	Huang Min (CHN)	01:35.5	Beijing	China
European	Mariia Pavlova (IPC)	01:26.1	Paris	France
Oceania	Tiffany Thomas Kane (AUS)	01:30.4	London	United Kingdom

==== Final ====
Rank	Lane	Athlete	Class	Result	Notes
1st place, gold medalist(s)	4	Mariia Pavlova (AIN)	SB7	1:24.51	WR
2nd place, silver medalist(s)	5	Iona Winnifrith (GBR)	SB7	1:26.57	
3rd place, bronze medalist(s)	3	Nahia Zudaire Borrezo (ESP)	SB7	1:33.87	
4	6	Cheuk Yan Ng (HKG)	SB7	1:35.68	
5	2	Naomi Mandujano (MEX)	SB7	1:39.18	
6	1	Rylee Sayer (NZL)	SB7	1:46.33	
7	7	Vendula Duskova (CZE)	SB7	1:47.54	

=== SB8 ===
The women's 100 metre breaststroke SB8 event was held on 28 September. Twelve swimmers took part, with the top eight progressing from heats to the final.

The relevant records at the beginning of the event were as follows:

Record	Athlete	Time	City	Country
World	Brock Whiston (GBR)	1:13.83	London	United Kingdom
Championship	Brock Whiston (GBR)	1:13.83	London	United Kingdom
African	Natalie Du Toit (RSA)	01:26.0	Eindhoven	Netherlands
Americas	Katarina Roxon (CAN)	01:22.0	London	United Kingdom
Asian	Mikuni Utsugi (JPN)	01:25.2	Fuji	Japan
European	Brock Whiston (GBR)	01:13.8	London	United Kingdom
Oceania	Sophie Pascoe (NZL)	01:20.3	Tokyo	Japan

==== Heats ====
Rank	Heat	Lane	Athlete	Class	Result	Notes
1	2	4	Anastasiya Dmytriv Dmytriv (ESP)	SB8	1:26.49	Q
2	1	4	Brock Whiston (GBR)	SB8	1:26.94	Q
3	1	3	Zhu Hui (CHN)	SB8	1:27.19	Q
4	1	2	Elena Kliachkina (AIN)	SB8	1:27.69	Q
5	2	6	Husnah Kukundakwe (UGA)	SB8	1:28.54	Q
6	1	5	Nuria Marques Soto (ESP)	SB8	1:29.01	Q
7	2	3	Adelina Razetdinova (AIN)	SB8	1:29.59	Q
8	2	5	Viktoriia Ishchiulova (AIN)	SB8	1:30.82	Q
9	2	2	Paula Novina (CRO)	SB8	1:31.79	
10	1	6	Efthymia Gkouli (GRE)	SB8	1:32.10	
11	2	7	Emma Mecic (CRO)	SB8	1:34.94	

==== Final ====
Rank	Lane	Athlete	Class	Result	Notes
1st place, gold medalist(s)	4	Anastasiya Dmytriv Dmytriv (ESP)	SB8	1:19.83	
2nd place, silver medalist(s)	5	Brock Whiston (GBR)	SB8	1:21.18	
3rd place, bronze medalist(s)	6	Elena Kliachkina (AIN)	SB8	1:25.05	
4	7	Nuria Marques Soto (ESP)	SB8	1:25.15	
5	3	Zhu Hui (CHN)	SB8	1:25.94	
6	1	Adelina Razetdinova (AIN)	SB8	1:27.05	
7	2	Husnah Kukundakwe (UGA)	SB8	1:27.37	
8	8	Viktoriia Ishchiulova (AIN)	SB8	1:28.86	

=== SB9 ===
The women's 100 metre breaststroke SB9 event will be held on 21 September.

The relevant records at the beginning of the event were as follows:

Record	Athlete	Time	City	Country
World	Chantalle Zijderveld (NED)	1:10.99	Tokyo	Japan
Championship	Chantalle Zijderveld (NED)	1:12.55	London	United Kingdom
African	Bongekile Sabeka (RSA)	01:47.5	Durban	South Africa
Americas	Jessica Sloan (CAN)	01:16.9	Sydney	Australia
Asian	Zhang Meng (CHN)	01:15.0	Paris	France
European	Chantalle Zijderveld (NED)	01:11.0	Tokyo	Japan
Oceania	Keira Stephens (AUS)	01:16.7	Manchester	United Kingdom

==== Final ====
Seven swimmers took part in a direct final.

Rank	Lane	Athlete	Time	Note
1st place, gold medalist(s)	4	Lisa Kruger (NED)	1:15.71	
2nd place, silver medalist(s)	3	Gabriella Smith (NZL)	1:19.56	
3rd place, bronze medalist(s)	5	Elizaveta Sidorenko (AIN)	1:20.27	
4	2	Ali Diehl (CAN)	1:21.05	
5	7	Freja Kvist (DEN)	1:21.56	
6	6	Zuzanna Boruszewska (POL)	1:22.24	
7	1	Nini Geladze (GEO)	1:39.33	

=== SB11 ===
The women's 100 metre breaststroke SB11 event will be held on 23 September. Eight swimmers will take part in a direct final.

The relevant records at the beginning of the event were as follows:

Record	Athlete	Time	City	Country
World	Daria Lukianenko (IPC)	1:17.65	Funchal	Portugal
Championship	Karolina Pelendritou (CYP)	1:19.97	Manchester	United Kingdom
African	Renette Bloem (RSA)	01:39.6	Eindhoven	Netherlands
Americas	Nadia Báez (ARG)	01:27.0	Paris	France
Asian	Ma Jia (CHN)	01:19.2	Paris	France
European	Daria Lukianenko (IPC)	01:17.7	Funchal	Portugal
Oceania	Tegan Reder (AUS)	01:35.2	Melbourne	Australia

==== Final ====
Rank	Lane	Athlete	Time	Note
1st place, gold medalist(s)	4	Daria Lukianenko (AIN)	1:18.25	CR
2nd place, silver medalist(s)	3	Karolina Pelendritou (CYP)	1:21.72	
3rd place, bronze medalist(s)	5	Ma Jia (CHN)	1:25.95	
4	2	Nadia Baez (ARG)	1:27.51	
5	6	Zhang Xiaotong (CHN)	1:28.31	
6	1	Martina Rabbolini (ITA)	1:31.09	
7	7	Sophie Jin Wen Soon (SGP)	1:35.40	
8	8	Kateryna Tkachuk (UKR)	1:38.83	

=== SB12 ===
The women's 100 metre breaststroke SB12 event were held on 24 September. Five swimmers took part in a direct final.

The relevant records at the beginning of the event were as follows:

Record	Athlete	Time	City	Country
World	Elena Semechin (GER)	1:12.54	Paris	France
Championship	Elena Semechin (GER)	1:13.13	Manchester	United Kingdom
African	Alani Ferreira (RSA)	01:21.4	Paris	France
Americas	Carol Santiago (BRA)	01:14.6	Berlin	Germany
Asian	Jietong Zheng (CHN)	01:20.0	Paris	France
European	Elena Semechin (GER)	01:12.5	Paris	France
Oceania	Jenna Jones (AUS)	01:22.0	Paris	France

==== Final ====
Rank	Lane	Athlete	Time	Notes
1st place, gold medalist(s)	4	Mariia Latritskaia (AIN)	1:19.91	
2nd place, silver medalist(s)	6	Astrid Carroll (GBR)	1:22.84	
3rd place, bronze medalist(s)	5	Zheng Jietong (CHN)	1:22.87	
4	3	Alessia Berra (ITA)	1:23.38	
5	7	Karina Petrikovicova (SVK)	1:34.97	

=== SB13 ===
The women's 100 metre breaststroke SB13 event will be held on 22 September. Eleven swimmers will take part, with the top eight progressing from heats to the final.

The relevant records at the beginning of the event were as follows:

Record	Athlete	Time	City	Country
World	Fotimakhon Amilova (UZB)	1:09.57	Jakarta	Indonesia
Championship	Rebecca Redfern (GBR)	1:14.73	London	United Kingdom
African	Alani Ferreira (RSA)	01:22.2	Funchal	Portugal
Americas	Colleen Young (USA)	01:14.8	Funchal	Portugal
Asian	Fotimakhon Amilova (UZB)	01:09.6	Jakarta	Indonesia
European	Elena Semechin (GER)	01:13.5	Tokyo	Japan
Oceania	Prue Watt (AUS)	01:18.2	Rio de Janeiro	Brazil

==== Heats ====
Rank	Heat	Lane	Athlete	Class	Result	Notes
1	2	4	Olivia Chambers (USA)	SB13	1:17.77	Q
2	1	3	Anastasiya Zudzilava (AIN)	SB13	1:19.55	Q
3	1	4	Róisín Ní Ríain (IRL)	SB13	1:20.04	Q
4	2	5	Marian Polo Lopez (ESP)	SB13	1:21.30	Q
5	2	3	Mubinabonu Khalilova (UZB)	SB13	1:22.23	Q
6	2	6	Danika Vyncke (RSA)	SB13	1:22.59	Q
7	1	6	Emma Feliu Martin (ESP)	SB13	1:22.62	Q
8	1	5	Alani Ferreira (RSA)	SB13	1:22.75	Q
9	2	2	Ariadna Edo Beltran (ESP)	SB13	1:26.01	
10	1	2	Alina Sinelnikova (KAZ)	SB13	1:28.57	
11	2	7	Zhang Ziyue (CHN)	SB13	1:40.72	

==== Final ====
Rank	Lane	Athlete	Class	Result	Notes
1st place, gold medalist(s)	4	Olivia Chambers (USA)	SB13	1:17.34	
2nd place, silver medalist(s)	3	Róisín Ní Ríain (IRL)	SB13	1:18.78	
3rd place, bronze medalist(s)	5	Anastasiya Zudzilava (AIN)	SB13	1:19.23	
4	6	Marian Polo Lopez (ESP)	SB13	1:19.27	
5	1	Emma Feliu Martin (ESP)	SB13	1:22.50	
6	8	Alani Ferreira (RSA)	SB13	1:23.50	
7	2	Danika Vyncke (RSA)	SB13	1:23.56	
8	7	Mubinabonu Khalilova (UZB)	SB13	1:25.55	

=== SB14 ===
The women's 100 metre breaststroke SB14 event will be held on 23 September. Seventeen swimmers will take part, with the top eight progressing from heats to the final.

The relevant records at the beginning of the event were as follows:

Record	Athlete	Time	City	Country
World	Michelle Alonso Morales (ESP)	1:12.02	Tokyo	Japan
Championship	Louise Fiddes (GBR)	1:13.20	London	United Kingdom
Americas	Beatriz de Araujo Flausino (BRA)	01:13.7	São Paulo	Brazil
Asian	Mikika Serizawa (JPN)	01:16.8	Hangzhou	China
European	Michelle Alonso (ESP)	01:12.0	Tokyo	Japan

==== Heats ====
Rank	Heat	Lane	Athlete	Class	Result	Notes
1	2	4	Beatriz de Araujo Flausino (BRA)	SB14	1:14.05	Q, AM
2	1	4	Débora Carneiro (BRA)	SB14	1:16.07	Q
3	1	3	Paige Leonhardt (AUS)	SB14	1:16.93	Q
4	2	5	Louise Fiddes (GBR)	SB14	1:17.52	Q
5	2	6	Bethany Firth (GBR)	SB14	1:17.37	wd
6	1		Olivia Newman-Baronius (GBR)	SB14	1:17.30	Q
7	2	3	Beatriz Carneiro (BRA)	SB14	1:18.16	Q
8	1	6	Mikika Serizawa (JPN)	SB14	1:19.96	Q
9	2	8	Daria Meleshko (AIN)	SB14	1:22.42	Rq
10	1	1	Citli Siloe Salinas Rojas (MEX)	SB14	1:23.81	
11	1	2	Giorgia Marchi (ITA)	SB14	1:24.26	
12	2	1	Wachiraphon Thavornvasu (THA)	SB14	1:24.93	
13	1	7	Pernilla Lindberg (SWE)	SB14	1:25.25	
14	2	2	Janina Falk (AUT)	SB14	1:25.69	
15	2	7	Hyewon Noh (KOR)	SB14	1:28.04	
16	1	8	Jazlene Shihui Tan (SGP)	SB14	1:50.69	

==== Final ====
Bethany Firth withdrew before the final, and was replaced by Daria Meleshko.

Rank	Lane	Athlete	Class	Result	Notes
1st place, gold medalist(s)	4	Beatriz de Araujo Flausino (BRA)	SB14	1:12.61	CR
2nd place, silver medalist(s)	5	Débora Carneiro (BRA)	SB14	1:15.08	
3rd place, bronze medalist(s)	6	Olivia Newman-Baronius (GBR)	SB14	1:15.63	
4	2	Louise Fiddes (GBR)	SB14	1:16.16	
5	3	Paige Leonhardt (AUS)	SB14	1:16.49	
6	7	Beatriz Carneiro (BRA)	SB14	1:17.22	
7	1	Mikika Serizawa (JPN)	SB14	1:20.18	
8	8	Daria Meleshko (AIN)	SB14	1:23.47	
