= 2025 World Para Swimming Championships – Women's 200 metre individual medley =

The women's 200 m individual medley events at the 2025 World Para Swimming Championships will be held at the Singapore Aquatic Centre between 21 and 27 September 2025.

== Schedule ==
Women's 200 m individual medley events will be held across the following schedule:

women's 200 m ind. medley
Day	Date	Classifications
Day 1	21 Sept	SM7
Day 2	22 Sept	SM9; SM10
Day 3	23 Sept	SM6
Day 4	24 Sept	SM5; SM11
Day 5	25 Sept	SM14
Day 6	26 Sept	SM8
Day 7	27 Sept	SM13

== Medal summary ==
Event	Gold	Silver	Bronze
SM5	He Shenggao; China	Monica Boggioni; Italy	Giulia Ghiretti; Italy
SM6	Zhu Ji; China	Liu Daomin; China	Grace Harvey; Great Britain
SM7	Mallory Weggemann; United States	Veronika Korzhova; Ukraine	Iona Winnifrith; Great Britain
SM8	Brock Whiston; Great Britain	Viktoriia Ishchiulova; Individual Neutral Athletes	Zhu Hui; China
SM9	Mary Jibb; Canada	Anastasiya Dmytriv Dmytriv; Spain	Zsofia Konkoly; Hungary
SM10	Defne Kurt; Turkey	Faye Rogers; Great Britain	Lisa Kruger; Netherlands
SM11	Daria Lukianenko; Individual Neutral Athletes	Zhang Xiaotong; China	Liesette Bruinsma; Netherlands
SM13	Olivia Chambers; United States	Carlotta Gilli; Italy	Róisín Ní Ríain; Ireland
SM14	Valeriia Shabalina; Individual Neutral Athletes	Olivia Newman-Baronius; Great Britain	Bethany Firth; Great Britain

== Race summaries ==
=== SM5 ===
The women's 200 metre individual medley SM 5 event was held on 24 September. Nine swimmers will take part, with the top eight progressing to the final.

The relevant records at the beginning of the event were as follows:

Record	Athlete	Time	City	Country
World	Natalia Ziani (UKR)	3:13.43	London	United Kingdom
Championship	Arianna Talamona (ITA)	3:19.62	London	United Kingdom
African	Ayaallah Tewfick (EGY)	03:52.6	Berlin	Germany
Americas	Esthefany Rodrigues (BRA)	03:43.9	São Paulo	Brazil
Asian	He Shenggao (CHN)	03:15.9	Hangzhou	China
European	Natalia Ziani (UKR)	03:13.4	London	United Kingdom
Oceania	Jennifer Newstead (NZL)	03:39.1	Atlanta	United States

==== Heats ====
Rank	Heat	Lane	Athlete	Class	Result	Notes
1	1	4	He Shenggao (CHN)	SM5	3:31.04	Q
2	1	5	Monica Boggioni (ITA)	SM5	3:41.40	Q
3	1	7	Alessandra Oliveira dos Santos (BRA)	SM5	3:49.16	Q
4	1	3	Giulia Ghiretti (ITA)	SM5	3:50.90	Q
5	1	2	Sevilay Ozturk (TUR)	SM5	3:56.23	Q
6	1	6	Maori Yui (JPN)	SM5	3:59.14	Q
7	1	1	Berta García Grau (ESP)	SM5	4:07.01	Q
8	1	0	Natalie Ornkvist (FIN)	SM5	4:07.90	Q
	1	8	Maria Fanouria Tziveleki (GRE)	SM5		DSQ

==== Final ====
Rank	Lane	Athlete	Class	Result	Notes
1st place, gold medalist(s)	4	He Shenggao (CHN)	SM5	3:19.66	
2nd place, silver medalist(s)	5	Monica Boggioni (ITA)	SM5	3:35.99	
3rd place, bronze medalist(s)	6	Giulia Ghiretti (ITA)	SM5	3:45.33	
4	3	Alessandra Oliveira dos Santos (BRA)	SM5	3:46.74	
5	2	Sevilay Ozturk (TUR)	SM5	3:56.92	
6	7	Maori Yui (JPN)	SM5	3:57.85	
7	8	Natalie Ornkvist (FIN)	SM5	4:00.42	
8	1	Berta García Grau (ESP)	SM5	4:11.31	

=== SM6 ===
The women's 200 metre individual medley SM 6 event will be held on 23 September. Six swimmers will take part in a direct final.

The relevant records at the beginning of the event were as follows:

Record	Athlete	Time	City	Country
World	Maisie Summers-Newton (GBR)	2:55.07	Berlin	Germany
Championship	Maisie Summers-Newton (GBR)	2:57.24	London	United Kingdom
African	Caitlin Botha (NAM)	08:15.0	Limoges	France
Americas	Ellie Marks (USA)	02:57.4	Tokyo	Japan
Asian	Song Lingling (CHN)	03:03.0	London	United Kingdom
European	Maisie Summers-Newton (GBR)	02:55.1	Berlin	Germany
Oceania	Tiffany Thomas Kane (AUS)	03:09.8	Rio de Janeiro	Brazil

==== Final ====
Rank	Lane	Athlete	Time	Notes
1st place, gold medalist(s)	6	Zhu Ji (CHN)	3:00.05	ASR
2nd place, silver medalist(s)	4	Daomin Liu (CHN)	3:04.54	
3rd place, bronze medalist(s)	5	Grace Harvey (GBR)	3:12.55	
4	3	Verena Schott (GER)	3:13.58	
5	2	Dearbhaile Brady (IRL)	3:18.13	

=== SM7 ===
The women's 200 metre individual medley SM 7 event will be held on 21 September. Eleven swimmers will take part, with the top eight progressing to the final.

The relevant records at the beginning of the event were as follows:

Record	Athlete	Time	City	Country
World	Mallory Weggemann (USA)	2:48.43	Eindhoven	Netherlands
Championship	Mallory Weggemann (USA)	2:48.43	Eindhoven	Netherlands
Americas	Mallory Weggemann (USA)	02:48.4	Eindhoven	Netherlands
Asian	Huang Min (CHN)	03:00.7	Beijing	China
European	Iona Winnifrith (GBR)	02:59.9	Sheffield	United Kingdom
Oceania	Jacqueline Freney (AUS)	02:54.4	London	United Kingdom

==== Heats ====
Rank	Heat	Lane	Athlete	Time	Note
1	2		Mallory Weggemann (USA)	2:57.05	Q
2	2		Veronika Korzhova (UKR)	2:59.10	Q
3	1		Julia Gaffney (USA)	3:04.92	Q
4	1		Iona Winnifrith (GBR)	3:04.98	Q
5	1		Ahalya Lettenberger (USA)	3:11.04	Q
6	2		Danielle Dorris (CAN)	3:11.28	Q
7	2		Naomi Somellera Mandujano (MEX)	3:13.90	Q
8	1		Cheuk Yan Ng (HKG)	3:16.71	Q
9	2		Naomi Ortiz Mendez (MEX)	3:18.63	R
10	2		Siomha Nic Bradaigh (IRL)	3:25.82	
11	1		Alejandra Aybar (DOM)	3:32.01	

==== Final ====
Rank	Lane	Athlete	Time	Note
1st place, gold medalist(s)		Mallory Weggemann (USA)	2:54.75	
2nd place, silver medalist(s)		Veronika Korzhova (UKR)	2:56.50	
3rd place, bronze medalist(s)		Iona Winnifrith (GBR)	3:01.29	
4		Julia Gaffney (USA)	3:03.83	
5		Danielle Dorris (CAN)	3:10.39	
6		Ahalya Lettenberger (USA)	3:10.96	
7		Cheuk Yan Ng (HKG)	3:13.47	
8		Naomi Somellera Mandujano (MEX)	3:14.32	

=== SM8 ===
The women's 200 metre individual medley SM 8 event was held on 26 September. Thirteen swimmers took part, with the top eight progressing to the final.

The relevant records at the beginning of the event were as follows:

Record	Athlete	Time	City	Country
World	Brock Whiston (GBR)	2:35.30	London	United Kingdom
Championship	Brock Whiston (GBR)	2:35.30	London	United Kingdom
African	Husnah Kukundakwe (UGA)	03:06.2	Manchester	United Kingdom
Americas	Jessica Long (USA)	02:36.0	Bismarck	United States
Asian	Zhu Hui (CHN)	02:46.4	Hangzhou	China
European	Brock Whiston (GBR)	02:35.3	London	United Kingdom
Oceania	Lakeisha Patterson (AUS)	02:45.2	Rio de Janeiro	Brazil

==== Heats ====
Rank	Heat	Lane	Athlete	Class	Result	Notes
1	1	4	Viktoriia Ishchiulova (AIN)	SM8	2:49.00	Q
2	1	5	Jessica Long (USA)	SM8	2:49.22	Q
3	1	3	Zhu Hui (CHN)	SM8	2:51.65	Q
4	1	7	Zheng Tingting (CHN)	SM8	2:51.93	Q
5	2	4	Brock Whiston (GBR)	SM8	2:52.72	Q
6	2	2	Paula Novina (CRO)	SM8	2:53.65	Q
7	2	6	Nahia Zudaire Borrezo (ESP)	SM8	2:56.90	Q
8	2	3	Xenia Francesca Palazzo (ITA)	SM8	2:58.51	
9	2	1	Husnah Kukundakwe (UGA)	SM8	3:03.72	Q, AF
10	2	7	Mira Jeanne Maack (GER)	SM8	3:05.26	
11	1	6	Mariia Pavlova (AIN)	SM8	3:06.11	
12	1	2	Vendula Duskova (CZE)	SM8	3:11.76	

==== Final ====
Rank	Lane	Athlete	Class	Result	Notes
1st place, gold medalist(s)	2	Brock Whiston (GBR)	SM8	2:40.25	
2nd place, silver medalist(s)	4	Viktoriia Ishchiulova (AIN)	SM8	2:43.81	
3rd place, bronze medalist(s)	3	Zhu Hui (CHN)	SM8	2:48.36	
4	5	Jessica Long (USA)	SM8	2:51.44	
5	7	Paula Novina (CRO)	SM8	2:51.67	
6	6	Zheng Tingting (CHN)	SM8	2:51.81	
7	1	Nahia Zudaire Borrezo (ESP)	SM8	2:54.34	
8	8	Husnah Kukundakwe (UGA)	SM8	3:03.51	

=== SM9 ===
The women's 200 metre individual medley SM 9 event will be held on 21 September. Eleven swimmers will take part, with the top eight progressing to the final.

The relevant records at the beginning of the event were as follows:

Record	Athlete	Time	City	Country
World	Sophie Pascoe (NZL)	2:25.22	Singapore	Singapore
Championship	Natalie Du Toit (RSA)	2:29.92	Durban	South Africa
African	Natalie Du Toit (RSA)	02:27.8	Beijing	China
Americas	Stephanie Dixon (CAN)	02:37.5	Beijing	China
Asian	Lin Ping (CHN)	02:35.6	Rio de Janeiro	Brazil
European	Tully Kearney (GBR)	02:31.1	Glasgow	United Kingdom
Oceania	Sophie Pascoe (NZL)	02:25.2	Singapore	Singapore

==== Heats ====
Rank	Heat	Lane	Athlete	Class	Result	Notes
1	1	6	Mary Jibb (CAN)	SM9	2:35.51	Q, AM
2	1	4	Zsofia Konkoly (HUN)	SM9	2:39.13	Q
3	1	2	Xu Jialing (CHN)	SM9	2:38.90	Q
4	1	5	Nuria Marques Soto (ESP)	SM9	2:39.31	Q
5	1	3	Anastasiya Dmytriv Dmytriv (ESP)	SM9	2:41.98	Q
6	1	8	Liu Ying (CHN)	SM9	2:43.47	Q
7	1	0	Ema Maeda (JPN)	SM9	2:44.31	Q
8	1	9	Beatriz Lerida Maldonado (ESP)	SM9	2:50.10	Q
9	1	1	Zuzanna Boruszewska (POL)	SM9	2:54.40	
	1	7	Emma Mecic (CRO)	SM9	DNS	

==== Final ====
Rank	Lane	Athlete	Class	Result	Notes
1st place, gold medalist(s)	4	Mary Jibb (CAN)	SM9	2:32.90	AM
2nd place, silver medalist(s)	2	Anastasiya Dmytriv Dmytriv (ESP)	SM9	2:35.36	
3rd place, bronze medalist(s)	3	Zsofia Konkoly (HUN)	SM9	2:36.09	
4	6	Zsofia Konkoly (HUN)	SM9	2:36.31	
5	5	Nuria Marques Soto (ESP)	SM9	2:36.78	
6	7	Xu Jialing (CHN)	SM9	2:41.66	
7	1	Liu Ying (CHN)	SM9	2:45.82	
8	8	Beatriz Lerida Maldonado (ESP)		2:47.54	

=== SM10 ===
The women's 200 metre individual medley SM 10 event will be held on 21 September. Eight swimmers will take part in a direct final.

The relevant records at the beginning of the event were as follows:

Record	Athlete	Time	City	Country
World	Chantalle Zijderveld (NED)	2:24.85	Tokyo	Japan
Championship	Sophie Pascoe (NZL)	2:26.51	Glasgow	United Kingdom
African	Joanica Kriegler (RSA)	02:59.0	Cairo	Egypt
Americas	Aurelie Rivard (CAN)	02:28.7	Tokyo	Japan
Asian	Zhang Meng (CHN)	02:26.8	Paris	France
European	Chantalle Zijderveld (NED)	02:24.9	Tokyo	Japan
Oceania	Sophie Pascoe (NZL)	02:24.9	Rio de Janeiro	Brazil

==== Final ====
Rank	Lane	Athlete	Class	Result	Notes
1st place, gold medalist(s)	1	Defne Kurt (TUR)	SM10	2:28.30	
2nd place, silver medalist(s)	2	Faye Rogers (GBR)	SM10	2:28.52	
3rd place, bronze medalist(s)	4	Lisa Kruger (NED)	SM10	2:32.07	
4	3	Katie Cosgriffe (CAN)	SM10	2:32.36	
5	6	Oliwia Jablonska (POL)	SM10	2:36.12	
6	2	Csenge Hotz (HUN)	SM10	2:36.50	
7	7	Poppy Wilson (AUS)	SM10	2:38.72	
8	1	Gabriella Smith (NZL)	SM10	2:40.00	

=== SM11 ===
The women's 200 metre individual medley SM 11 event was held on 24 September. Six swimmers will take part in a direct final.

The relevant records at the beginning of the event were as follows:

Record	Athlete	Time	City	Country
World	Daria Lukianenko (IPC)	2:37.77	Paris	France
Championship	Ma Jia (CHN)	2:40.10	Manchester	United Kingdom
African	Renette Bloem (RSA)	03:32.6	Eindhoven	Netherlands
Americas	Anastasia Pagonis (USA)	02:45.6	Tokyo	Japan
Asian	Ma Jia (CHN)	02:38.7	Paris	France
European	Daria Lukianenko (IPC)	02:37.8	Paris	France
Oceania	Mary Fisher (NZL)	02:46.9	London	United Kingdom

==== Final ====
Rank	Lane	Athlete	Class	Result	Notes
1st place, gold medalist(s)	4	Daria Lukianenko (AIN)	SM11	2:40.82	
2nd place, silver medalist(s)	6	Zhang Xiaotong (CHN)	SM11	2:48.14	
3rd place, bronze medalist(s)	3	Liesette Bruinsma (NED)	SM11	2:48.15	
4	5	Ma Jia (CHN)	SM11	2:57.94	
5	2	Matilde Estefania Alcazar Figueroa (MEX)	SM11	3:06.18	
6	7	Martina Rabbolini (ITA)	SM11	3:10.36	

=== SM13 ===
The women's 200 metre individual medley SM 13 event will be held on 24 September. SM12 swimmer are eligible for this event.

The relevant records at the beginning of the event were as follows:

Record	Athlete	Time	City	Country
SM12
World	Rebecca Meyers (USA)	2:24.56	London	United Kingdom
Championship	Rebecca Meyers (USA)	2:24.56	London	United Kingdom
African	Alani Ferreira (RSA)	02:46.9	Manchester	United Kingdom
Americas	Rebecca Meyers (USA)	02:24.6	London	United Kingdom
Asian	Zhu Hongyan (CHN)	02:30.1	Athens	Greece
European	Daria Pikalova (RUS)	02:24.9	Glasgow	United Kingdom
Oceania	Jenna Jones (AUS)	02:38.6	Melbourne	Australia
SM13
World	Carlotta Gilli (ITA)	2:21.44	Tokyo	Japan
Championship	Carlotta Gilli (ITA)	2:24.46	London	United Kingdom
African	Alani Ferreira (RSA)	02:45.9	Funchal	Portugal
Americas	Rebecca Meyers (USA)	02:24.6	Glasgow	United Kingdom
Asian	Fotimakhon Amilova (UZB)	02:21.8	Jakarta	Indonesia
European	Carlotta Gilli (ITA)	02:21.4	Tokyo	Japan
Oceania	Prue Watt (AUS)	02:32.9	Beijing	China

==== Heats ====
Thirteen swimmers will take part, with the top eight progressing to the final

Rank	Heat	Lane	Athlete	Class	Time	Notes
1	2	4	Olivia Chambers (USA)	SM13	2:29.05	Q
2	1	4	Carlotta Gilli (ITA)	SM13	2:31.46	Q
3	2	5	Roisin Ni Riain (IRL)	SM13	2:34.90	Q
4	2	3	Grace Nuhfer (USA)	SM13	2:34.91	Q
5	1	5	Marian Polo Lopez (ESP)	SM13	2:36.74	Q
6	1	6	Ariadna Edo Beltran (ESP)	SM13	2:38.00	Q
7	1	3	Aleksandra Ziablitseva (AIN)	SM13	2:40.02	Q
8	2	6	Emma Feliu Martin (ESP)	SM13	2:42.31	Q
9	2	2	Anastasiya Zudzilava (AIN)	SM13	2:45.54	
10	2	7	Alani Ferreira (RSA)	SM13	2:49.50	
11	2	1	Jietong Zheng (CHN)	SM12	2:50.09	
12	1	7	Ela Letton-Jones (GBR)	SM12	2:50.41	
13	1	2	Danika Vyncke (RSA)	SM13	2:51.86	

==== Final ====
Rank	Lane	Athlete	Time	Notes
1st place, gold medalist(s)	4	Olivia Chambers (USA)	2:25.83	
2nd place, silver medalist(s)	5	Carlotta Gilli (ITA)	2:28.69	
3rd place, bronze medalist(s)	3	Roisin Ni Riain (IRL)	2:29.75	
4	6	Grace Nuhfer (USA)	2:33.23	
5	2	Marian Polo Lopez (ESP)	2:34.56	
6	1	Aleksandra Ziablitseva (AIN)	2:36.18	
7	7	Ariadna Edo Beltran (ESP)	2:38.49	
8	8	Emma Feliu Martin (ESP)	2:41.67	

=== SM14 ===
The women's 200 metre individual medley SM 14 event was held on 25 September. Ten swimmers took part, with the top eight progressing to the final.

The relevant records at the beginning of the event were as follows:

Event	Class	Record	Athlete	Time	City	Country
Women's 200 m Individual Medley	SM14	World	Valeriia Shabalina (RUS)	2:18.37	Funchal	Portugal
Women's 200 m Individual Medley	SM14	Championship	Valeriia Shabalina (RUS)	2:18.78	London	United Kingdom
Women's 200 m Individual Medley	SM14	Asian	Aira Kinoshita (JPN)	02:24.3	Manchester	United Kingdom
Women's 200 m Individual Medley	SM14	European	Valeriia Shabalina (RUS)	02:18.4	Funchal	Portugal

==== Heats ====
Rank	Heat	Lane	Athlete	Class	Result	Notes
1	1	3	Olivia Newman-Baronius (GBR)	SM14	2:26.89	Q
2	1	4	Valeriia Shabalina (AIN)	SM14	2:30.51	Q
3	1	5	Poppy Maskill (GBR)	SM14	2:32.09	Q
4	1	6	Bethany Firth (GBR)	SM14	2:32.63	Q
5	1	0	Citli Siloe Salinas Rojas (MEX)	SM14	2:35.99	Q
6	1	2	Pernilla Lindberg (SWE)	SM14	2:36.54	Q
7	1	7	Ho Ying Cheung (HKG)	SM14	2:37.34	Q
8	1	1	Nattharinee Khajhonmatha (THA)	SM14	2:37.94	Q
9	1	8	Janina Falk (AUT)	SM14	2:44.70	

==== Final ====
Rank	Lane	Athlete	Class	Result	Notes
1st place, gold medalist(s)	5	Valeriia Shabalina (AIN)	SM14	2:22.50	
2nd place, silver medalist(s)	4	Olivia Newman-Baronius (GBR)	SM14	2:23.49	
3rd place, bronze medalist(s)	6	Bethany Firth (GBR)	SM14	2:25.24	
4	3	Poppy Maskill (GBR)	SM14	2:28.40	
5	2	Citli Siloe Salinas Rojas (MEX)	SM14	2:34.48	
6	1	Ho Ying Cheung (HKG)	SM14	2:35.39	
7	7	Pernilla Lindberg (SWE)	SM14	2:35.73	
8	8	Nattharinee Khajhonmatha (THA)	SM14	2:36.18	
