= Swimming at the 2020 Summer Paralympics – Women's 400 metre freestyle S6 =

Women's 400 metre freestyle S6 at the XVI Paralympic Games
- Venue: Tokyo Aquatics Centre
- Dates: 2 September 2021
- Competitors: 13 from 9 nations

Medalists
1st place, gold medalist(s)		Jiang Yuyan	China
2nd place, silver medalist(s)		Yelyzaveta Mereshko	Ukraine
3rd place, bronze medalist(s)		Nora Meister	Switzerland

The Women's 400 metre freestyle S6 event at the 2020 Paralympic Games took place on 2 September 2021, at the Tokyo Aquatics Centre.

== Heats ==
The swimmers with the top eight times, regardless of heat, advanced to the final.

Rank	Heat	Lane	Name	Nationality	Time	Notes
1	1	4	Jiang Yuyan	China	5:14.52	Q, PR
2	2	4	Nora Meister	Switzerland	5:23.91	Q
3	2	5	Yelyzaveta Mereshko	Ukraine	5:26.35	Q
4	1	5	Eleanor Simmonds	Great Britain	5:27.64	Q
5	2	3	Maisie Summers-Newton	Great Britain	5:27.91	Q
6	1	6	Grace Harvey	Great Britain	5:33.78	Q
7	2	6	Laila Suzigan	Brazil	5:39.00	Q
8	1	3	Song Lingling	China	5:40.54	Q
9	2	2	Sara Vargas Blanco	Colombia	5:46.87	
10	1	2	Evelin Száraz	Hungary	5:58.09	
11	1	7	Fanni Illés	Hungary	5:59.05	
12	2	7	Ayaallah Tewfick	Egypt	6:06.56	
13	2	1	Thelma Björg Björnsdóttir	Iceland	6:31.67	

== Final ==
400m freestyle final
Rank	Lane	Name	Nationality	Time	Notes
1st place, gold medalist(s)	4	Jiang Yuyan	China	5:04.57	WR
2nd place, silver medalist(s)	3	Yelyzaveta Mereshko	Ukraine	5:12.61	
3rd place, bronze medalist(s)	5	Nora Meister	Switzerland	5:19.67	
4	2	Maisie Summers-Newton	Great Britain	5:24.42	
5	6	Eleanor Simmonds	Great Britain	5:27.99	
6	8	Song Lingling	China	5:28.88	
7	7	Grace Harvey	Great Britain	5:36.86	
8	1	Laila Suzigan	Brazil	5:38.72	
