= Swimming at the 2020 Summer Paralympics – Women's 100 metre breaststroke SB6 =

Women's 100 metre breaststroke SB6 at the XVI Paralympic Games
- Venue: Tokyo Aquatics Centre
- Dates: 28 August 2021
- Competitors: 11 from 8 nations

Medalists
1st place, gold medalist(s)		Maisie Summers-Newton	Great Britain
2nd place, silver medalist(s)		Liu Daomin	China
3rd place, bronze medalist(s)		Sophia Herzog	United States

The Women's 100 metre breaststroke SB6 event at the 2020 Paralympic Games took place on 28 August 2021, at the Tokyo Aquatics Centre.

== Heats ==
The swimmers with the top eight times, regardless of heat, advanced to the final.

Rank	Heat	Lane	Name	Nationality	Time	Notes
1	1	4	Maisie Summers-Newton	Great Britain	1:33.12	Q, PR, ER
2	2	4	Liu Daomin	China	1:35.43	Q
3	2	5	Sophia Herzog	United States	1:35.50	Q, AM
4	1	5	Eleanor Simmonds	Great Britain	1:39.95	Q
5	1	6	Nicole Turner	Ireland	1:40.82	Q
6	1	3	Evelin Száraz	Hungary	1:42.02	Q
7	2	6	Viktoriia Savtsova	Ukraine	1:42.04	Q
8	2	2	Camille Bérubé	Canada	1:42.80	Q
9	2	3	Mallory Weggemann	United States	1:43.29	
10	1	2	Danielle Kisser	Canada	1:49.04	
11	2	7	Lourdes Alejandra Aybar Díaz	Dominican Republic	1:53.25	

== Final ==
Rank	Lane	Name	Nationality	Time	Notes
1st place, gold medalist(s)	4	Maisie Summers-Newton	Great Britain	1:32.34	PR, ER
2nd place, silver medalist(s)	5	Liu Daomin	China	1:33.30	
3rd place, bronze medalist(s)	3	Sophia Herzog	United States	1:36.06	
4	6	Eleanor Simmonds	Great Britain	1:39.94	
5	1	Viktoriia Savtsova	Ukraine	1:40.49	
6	7	Evelin Száraz	Hungary	1:41.19	
7	2	Nicole Turner	Ireland	1:41.63	
8	8	Camille Bérubé	Canada	1:44.07	
