= Swimming at the 2020 Summer Paralympics – Women's 100 metre breaststroke SB5 =

Women's 100 metre breaststroke SB5 at the XVI Paralympic Games
- Venue: Tokyo Aquatics Centre
- Dates: 28 August 2021
- Competitors: 10 from 10 nations

Medalists
1st place, gold medalist(s)		Yelyzaveta Mereshko	Ukraine
2nd place, silver medalist(s)		Grace Harvey	Great Britain
3rd place, bronze medalist(s)		Verena Schott	Germany

The Women's 100 metre breaststroke SB5 event at the 2020 Paralympic Games took place on 28 August 2021, at the Tokyo Aquatics Centre.

== Heats ==
The swimmers with the top eight times, regardless of heat, advanced to the final.

Rank	Heat	Lane	Name	Nationality	Time	Notes
1	1	4	Grace Harvey	Great Britain	1:42.09	Q
2	2	4	Yelyzaveta Mereshko	Ukraine	1:43.00	Q
3	1	3	Arianna Talamona	Italy	1:44.60	Q
4	1	5	Sarah Louise Rung	Norway	1:46.21	Q
5	2	5	Verena Schott	Germany	1:46.73	Q
6	2	3	Song Lingling	China	1:49.80	Q
7	1	6	Trịnh Thị Bích Như	Vietnam	1:53.31	Q
8	2	6	Thelma Björg Björnsdóttir	Iceland	1:54.02	Q
9	1	2	Maori Yui	Japan	2:02.31	
10	2	2	Maria Tsakona	Greece	2:02.32	

== Final ==
Rank	Lane	Name	Nationality	Time	Notes
1st place, gold medalist(s)	5	Yelyzaveta Mereshko	Ukraine	1:40.59	
2nd place, silver medalist(s)	4	Grace Harvey	Great Britain	1:42.22	
3rd place, bronze medalist(s)	2	Verena Schott	Germany	1:43.61	
4	7	Song Lingling	China	1:43.73	
5	3	Arianna Talamona	Italy	1:43.83	
6	6	Sarah Louise Rung	Norway	1:44.39	
7	1	Trịnh Thị Bích Như	Vietnam	1:53.00	
8	8	Thelma Björg Björnsdóttir	Iceland	1:54.88	
