= 2023 World Para Swimming Championships – Women's 100 metre breaststroke =

The women's 100m breaststroke events at the 2023 World Para Swimming Championships were held at the Manchester Aquatics Centre between 31 July and 6 August.

== Medalists ==
| Event | Gold | Silver | Bronze |
|---|---|---|---|
| SB4 | Giulia Ghiretti; Italy | Cheng Jiao; China | Yao Cuan; China |
| SB5 | Verena Schott; Germany | Grace Harvey; Great Britain | Anna Hontar; Ukraine |
| SB6 | Maisie Summers-Newton; Great Britain | Ng Cheuk Yan; Hong Kong | Evelin Száraz; Hungary |
| SB7 | Tess Routliffe; Canada | Abi Tripp; Canada | Nahia Zudaire; Spain |
| SB8 | Anastasiya Dmytriv; Spain | Ellen Keane; Ireland | Katarina Roxon; Canada |
| SB9 | Chantalle Zijderveld; Netherlands | Lisa Kruger; Netherlands | Keira Stephens; Australia |
| SB11 | Karolina Pelendritou; Cyprus | Ma Jia; China | Nadia Báez; Argentina |
| SB12 | Elena Krawzow; Germany | Maria Carolina Gomes Santiago; Brazil | Alani Ferreira; South Africa |
| SB13 | Rebecca Redfern; Great Britain | Colleen Young; United States | Olivia Chambers; United States |
| SB14 | Débora Carneiro; Brazil | Beatriz Borges Carneiro; Brazil | Paige Leonhardt; Australia |

== Results ==
=== SB4 ===
Final

Eight swimmers from seven nations took part.

| Rank | Name | Nation | Result | Notes |
|---|---|---|---|---|
| 1st place, gold medalist(s) | Giulia Ghiretti | Italy | 1:50.64 | |
| 2nd place, silver medalist(s) | Cheng Jiao | China | 1:52.18 | |
| 3rd place, bronze medalist(s) | Yao Cuan | China | 1:56.80 | |
| 4 | Solène Sache | France | 2:09.21 | |
| 5 | Gabriela Oviedo Rueda | Colombia | 2:26.49 | |
| 6 | Anna Ploszynska | Poland | 2:32.70 | |
| 7 | Susana Schnarndorf | Brazil | 2:34.43 | |
| | Monique Schacher | Switzerland | DSQ | |

=== SB9 ===
Final

Eight swimmers from seven nations took part.

| Rank | Name | Nation | Result | Notes |
|---|---|---|---|---|
| 1st place, gold medalist(s) | Chantalle Zijderveld | Netherlands | 1:13.03 | |
| 2nd place, silver medalist(s) | Lisa Kruger | Netherlands | 1:15.73 | |
| 3rd place, bronze medalist(s) | Keira Stephens | Australia | 1:16.73 | OC |
| 4 | Brock Whiston | United Kingdom | 1:16.82 | |
| 5 | Tatyana Lebrun | Belgium | 1:17.88 | |
| 6 | Zhang Meng | China | 1:18.00 | AS |
| 7 | Gabriella Smith | New Zealand | 1:20.11 | |
| 8 | Daniela Giménez | Argentina | 1:21.00 | |

=== SB13 ===
Final

Seven swimmers from five nations took part.

| Rank | Name | Nation | Result | Notes |
|---|---|---|---|---|
| 1st place, gold medalist(s) | Rebecca Redfern | United Kingdom | 1:15.01 | |
| 2nd place, silver medalist(s) | Colleen Young | United States | 1:15.89 | |
| 3rd place, bronze medalist(s) | Olivia Chambers | United States | 1:18.45 | |
| 4 | Roisin Ni Riain | Ireland | 1:18.99 | |
| 5 | Marian Polo López | Spain | 1:20.73 | |
| 6 | Emma Feliu | Spain | 1:22.88 | |
| 7 | Danika Vyncke | South Africa | 1:23.08 | |
