= 2023 World Para Swimming Championships – Women's 100 metre butterfly =

The women's 100m butterfly events at the 2023 World Para Swimming Championships were held at the Manchester Aquatics Centre between 31 July and 6 August.

== Medalists ==
Event	Gold	Silver	Bronze
S8	Jessica Long; United States	Lu Weiyuan; China	Jiang Shengnan; China
S9	Xu Jialing; China	Zsofia Konkoly; Hungary	Emily Beecroft; Australia
S10	Faye Rogers; Great Britain	Lisa Kruger; Netherlands	Jasmine Greenwood; Australia
S12	Maria Carolina Gomes Santiago; Brazil	María Delgado; Spain	Alessia Berra; Italy
S13	Carlotta Gilli; Italy	Róisín Ní Ríain; Ireland	Olivia Chambers; United States
S14	Chan Yui-lam; Hong Kong	Poppy Maskill; Great Britain	Bethany Firth; Great Britain

== Results ==
=== S13 ===
Final

Seven swimmers from six nations took part.

Rank	Athlete	Nation	Result	Notes
1st place, gold medalist(s)	Carlotta Gilli	Italy	1:02.61	CR
2nd place, silver medalist(s)	Róisín Ní Ríain	Ireland	1:06.00	
3rd place, bronze medalist(s)	Olivia Chambers	United States	1:06.18	
4	Joanna Mendak	Poland	1:07.51	
5	Muslima Odilova	Uzbekistan	1:07.88	
6	Marian Polo Lopez	Spain	1:09.20	
7	Ariadna Edo Beltrán	Spain	1:11.27	
