= Swimming at the 2022 Commonwealth Games – Women's 100 metre breaststroke SB6 =

Women's 100 metre breaststroke SB6 at the 2022 Commonwealth Games
- Venue: Sandwell Aquatics Centre
- Dates: 1 August 2022
- Competitors: 6 from 3 nations
- Winning time: 1:32.72

Medalists
gold medal	Maisie Summers-Newton	England
silver medal	Grace Harvey	England
bronze medal	Camille Bérubé	Canada

The Women's 100 metre breaststroke SB6 event at the 2022 Commonwealth Games was held on 1 August at the Sandwell Aquatics Centre.

== Schedule ==
The schedule was as follows:

All times are British Summer Time (UTC+1)

Date	Time	Round
Monday 1 August 2022	20:22	Final

== Results ==
=== Final ===
Rank	Lane	Name	Nationality	Time	Notes
1st place, gold medalist(s)	4	Maisie Summers-Newton	England	1:32.72	
2nd place, silver medalist(s)	5	Grace Harvey	England	1:43.29	
3rd place, bronze medalist(s)	3	Camille Bérubé	Canada	1:43.81	
4	6	Danielle Kisser	Canada	1:50.04	
5	2	Isabella Vincent	Australia	1:52.74	
6	7	Ella Jones	Australia	1:56.14	
