= 2022 World Para Swimming Championships – Women's 100 metre breaststroke =

The women's 100m breaststroke events at the 2022 World Para Swimming Championships were held at the Penteada Olympic Swimming Complex in Madeira between 12 and 18 June.

== Medalists ==
Event	Gold	Silver	Bronze
SB4	Giulia Ghiretti; Italy	Monica Boggioni; Italy	Solène Sache; France
SB5	Grace Harvey; Great Britain	Thelma Bjorg Bjornsdottir; Iceland	Ayaallah Tewfick; Egypt
SB6	Maisie Summers-Newton; Great Britain	Sophia Herzog; United States	Evelin Szaraz; Hungary
SB7	Tess Routliffe; Canada	Nikita Howarth; New Zealand	Naomi Somellera Mandujano; Mexico
SB8	Anastasiya Dmytriv; Spain	Ellen Keane; Ireland	Katarina Roxon; Canada
SB9	Lisa Kruger; Netherlands	Keira Stephens; Australia	Tatyana Lebrun; Belgium
SB11	Karolina Pelendritou; Cyprus	Nadia Báez; Argentina	Yana Berezhna; Ukraine
SB12	Maria Carolina Gomes Santiago; Brazil	Sophie Jin Wen Soon; Singapore	Cornelle Leach; South Africa
SB13	Colleen Young; United States	Elena Krawzow; Germany	Rebecca Redfern; Great Britain
SB14	Michelle Alonso; Spain	Paige Leonhardt; Australia	Débora Carneiro; Brazil

== Results ==
=== SB4 ===
Final

Seven swimmers from five nations took part.

Rank	Name	Nation	Result	Notes
1st place, gold medalist(s)	Giulia Ghiretti	Italy	53.39	
2nd place, silver medalist(s)	Monica Boggioni	Italy	53.43	
3rd place, bronze medalist(s)	Solène Sache	France	1:00.74	
4	Malak Abdelshafi	Egypt	1:02.87	
5	Jessica Tinney	Canada	1:09.39	
6	Ana Laura Morales Lopez	Mexico	1:17.34	
7	Jordan Tucker	Canada	1:45.35	

=== SB5 ===
Final

Six swimmers from six nations took part.

Rank	Name	Nation	Result	Notes
1st place, gold medalist(s)	Grace Harvey	United Kingdom	1:41.19	
2nd place, silver medalist(s)	Thelma Bjorg Bjornsdottir	Iceland	1:58.23	
3rd place, bronze medalist(s)	Ayaallah Tewfick	Egypt	2:01.86	
4	Maori Yui	Japan	2:02.89	
5	Maria Tsakona	Greece	2:02.94	
6	Sofiia Fedorenko	Ukraine	2:09.65	

=== SB12 ===
Final

Four swimmers from four nations took part.

Rank	Name	Nation	Result	Notes
1st place, gold medalist(s)	Maria Carolina Gomes Santiago	Brazil	1:14.91	
2nd place, silver medalist(s)	Sophie Jin Wen Soon	Singapore	1:25.89	AS
3rd place, bronze medalist(s)	Cornelle Leach	South Africa	1:28.60	AF
4	Belkis Mota	Venezuela	1:35.27	
