= Zheng Jietong =

Chinese Paralympic swimmer

Personal information
- Born: 11 November 2001 (age 24) Taiyuan, China

Sport
- Sport: Para swimming
- Disability class: S12, SB12
Medal record
Women's para swimming
Representing China
Paralympic Games
Bronze medal – third place	2024 Paris	100 m breaststroke SB12
World Championships
Bronze medal – third place	2025 Singapore	100 m breaststroke SB12

Zheng Jietong (born 11 November 2001) is a Chinese Paralympic swimmer. She represented China at the 2024 Summer Paralympics.

== Career ==
Zheng represented China at the 2024 Summer Paralympics and won a bronze medal in the 100 m breaststroke SB12 event.
