= Beatriz de Araújo Flausino =

Brazilian para swimmer

Personal information
- Nationality: Brazilian

Sport
- Sport: Para swimming
- Disability class: S14, SB14
Medal record
Women's para swimming
Representing Brazil
World Championships
Gold medal – first place	2025 Singapore	100 m breaststroke SB14
Silver medal – second place	2025 Singapore	Mixed 4×100 m medley relay S14

Beatriz de Araújo Flausino is a Brazilian para swimmer.

== Career ==
Flausino competed at the 2025 Para Swimming World Series and won gold medals in the 100 metre breaststroke and 100 metre butterfly S14 events. She then competed at the 2025 World Para Swimming Championships and won a gold medal in the 100 metre breaststroke SB14 event, with a championship record time of 1:12.61. She also won a silver medal in the mixed 4 × 100 metre medley relay S14 event.
