= Alessandra Oliveira (swimmer) =

Brazilian Paralympic swimmer (born 2008)

Personal information
- Full name: Alessandra Oliveira dos Santos
- Nationality: Brazilian
- Born: 13 June 2008 (age 18) São Paulo, Brazil

Sport
- Sport: Para swimming
- Disability class: S4
Medal record
Women's para swimming
Representing Brazil
World Championships
Gold medal – first place	2025 Singapore	100m breaststroke SB4
Gold medal – first place	2025 Singapore	Mixed 4x50 m medley relay 20pts
Parapan American Games
Gold medal – first place	2023 Santiago	100m breaststroke S4

Alessandra Oliveira dos Santos (born 13 June 2008) is a Brazilian Paralympic swimmer. She is a medalist at the Parapan American Games and the World Para Swimming Championships.

== Early life ==
Alessandra Oliveira dos Santos was born in São Paulo, on 13 June 2008. At the age of three, she was diagnosed with vasculitis, requiring amputation of both her upper and lower limbs. She began her swimming career in 2010, at the age of ten, through the Paralympic Sports School, becoming an athlete with the Paradesportiva De Novo Horizonte Association.

== Career ==
In 2023, Oliveira was selected by the Brazilian Paralympic Committee (CPB) to join the Brazilian delegation at the 2023 Parapan American Games, held in Santiago, Chile. At fifteen years of age, she won the gold medal for Brazil in the 100m breaststroke SB4, beating Colombian Gabriela Oviedo and Brazilian Susana Schnarndorf, who completed the podium.

In September 2025, Oliveira competed at the 2025 World Para Swimming Championships held in Singapore. She won the gold medal in the 100m breaststroke, which was also her first medal in the championships. She was then added to the Brazilian team that won the mixed 4x50 m medley relay 20pts event.
