= Zhu Hui =

Chinese para swimmer (born 2008)

- Hui in 2024

Personal information
- Nationality: Chinese
- Born: 18 September 2008 (age 18)

Sport
- Sport: Para swimming
- Disability class: S8, SM8
Medal record
Women's para swimming
Representing China
World Championships
Silver medal – second place	2025 Singapore	50 m freestyle S8
Bronze medal – third place	2025 Singapore	200 m ind. medley SM8

Zhu Hui (born 18 September 2008) is a Chinese para swimmer. She represented China at the 2024 Summer Paralympics.

== Career ==
Zhu represented China at the 2024 Summer Paralympics. Her best finish was fifth place in the 50 metre freestyle S8 event. At 15 years-old, she was the youngest member of the Chinese delegation at the Paralympics. She competed at the 2025 World Para Swimming Championships and won a silver medal in the 50 metre freestyle S8 event.
