= Olivia Chambers =

American Paralympic swimmer (born 2003)

Personal information
- Born: April 11, 2003 (age 23) Little Rock, Arkansas, U.S.

Sport
- Sport: Para swimming
- Disability class: S13, SB13, SM13
- College team: University of Northern Iowa
Medal record
Women's para swimming
Representing the United States
Event	1st	2nd	3rd
Paralympic Games	1	2	0
World Championships	4	2	5
Total	5	4	5
Paralympic Games
Gold medal – first place	2024 Paris	400 m freestyle S13
Silver medal – second place	2024 Paris	100 m breaststroke SB13
Silver medal – second place	2024 Paris	200 m medley SM13
World Championships
Gold medal – first place	2025 Singapore	100 m breaststroke SB13
Gold medal – first place	2025 Singapore	100 m freestyle S13
Gold medal – first place	2025 Singapore	400 m freestyle S13
Gold medal – first place	2025 Singapore	200 m medley SM13
Silver medal – second place	2023 Manchester	200 m medley SM13
Silver medal – second place	2023 Manchester	400 m freestyle S13
Bronze medal – third place	2023 Manchester	100 m breaststroke SB13
Bronze medal – third place	2023 Manchester	100 m butterfly S13
Bronze medal – third place	2023 Manchester	50 m freestyle S13
Bronze medal – third place	2023 Manchester	100 m freestyle S13
Bronze medal – third place	2025 Singapore	50 m freestyle S13

Olivia Chambers (born April 11, 2003) is a visually impaired American para swimmer, who competes in the S13 classification. She won a gold medal and two silver medals at the 2024 Summer Paralympics.

== Career ==
=== 2022 ===
Chambers competed in her first para-specific swim meet in early May at the Bill Keating Cincinnati Para-Swimming Open. She achieved times fast enough to be named to the U.S. Para Swimming National Team. In July, Chambers recorded her first U.S. Para Swimming American Record in the 400-meter individual medley S13 at the USA Swimming Futures Championships in Minneapolis, Minnesota.

In October, Chambers made her international debut at the Citi Para Swimming World Series in Tijuana, Mexico. Recording personal best times in both events, she claimed a silver medal in the 400-meter freestyle and a bronze medal in the 100-meter butterfly, her first international medals. Chambers also swam the 100-meter backstroke, finishing fourth.

At the 2022 U.S. Paralympic National Championships, she won gold medals in the 400-meter freestyle and 200-meter individual medley and a bronze medal in the 100-meter butterfly. She was subsequently named the Swimmer of the Meet by virtue of having the best overall point total among competing athletes.

=== 2023 ===
On January 24, 2023, Chambers was named to the 2023 U.S. Paralympics Swimming National Team roster. On April 29, 2023, she was named to team USA's roster to compete at the 2023 World Para Swimming Championships. She won a medal in all six events she competed in, to lead the United States in medals. On the first day of the competition she won a bronze medal in the 100 m butterfly S13 event. On the second day she won a bronze medal in the 100 m breaststroke SB13 event. On the third day she won a bronze medal in the 100 m freestyle S13 event, with a career-best time of 1:00.12. After an off day, on the fifth day she won a bronze medal in the 50 m freestyle S13 event. On the sixth day she won a silver medal in the 400 m freestyle S13 event. On the final day of the competition she won a silver medal in the 200 m individual medley SM13 event.

=== 2024 ===
On June 30, 2024, Chambers was named to team USA's roster to compete at the 2024 Summer Paralympics. At the Paralympics she won a gold medal in the 400 metre freestyle S13 event and silver medals in the 100 metre breaststroke SB13 and 200 metre individual medley SM13 events.

In December at the U.S. Para Swimming National Championships, Chambers established a new World Record and personal best in the 1500-meter freestyle S13 with a 17:48.60, lowering her previous record by over five seconds. In the process, her initial 800-meters of the race set a new World Record in the 800-meter freestyle S13 at 9:29.21.

=== 2025 ===
On May 29, 2025, she was named to team USA's roster to compete at the 2025 World Para Swimming Championships. She won gold medals in the 100 metre breaststroke SB13, 100 metre freestyle S13, 400 metre freestyle S13 and 200 metre individual medley S13, and a bronze medal in the 50 metre freestyle S13 event.

== Personal life ==
Chambers began losing her vision in August 2019 when she was 16 and was declared legally blind. She was later diagnosed with multiple mitochondrial gene deletion syndrome. Chambers has a guide dog named Mahi. She and her dog have been paired together since late August 2023.

She is the co-host of the podcast Optical Delusion, along with fellow Paralympic swimmer Grace Nuhfer.

== Record swims ==
No.	Type	Event	Time	Location	Date	Status	Ref
1	American	400 m ind medley	5:21.68	Minneapolis, MN	July 28, 2022	Former	
2	American	400 y ind medley	4:29.27	Topeka, KS	November 19, 2022	Former	
3	American	50 y back	27.87	Sioux Falls, SD	February 4, 2023	Former	
4	American	200 y fly	2:10.99	Sioux Falls, SD	February 4, 2023	Former	
5	American	50 y back	26.53	Iowa City, IA	February 15, 2023	Current	
6	American	1000 y free	10:20.93	Iowa City, IA	February 18, 2023	Former	
7	American	400 m ind medley	5:12.62	Cedar Falls, IA	July 6, 2023	Current	
8	American	200 m fly	2:31.50	Cedar Falls, IA	July 7, 2023	Former	
9	American	500 y free	4:58.42	Morgantown, WV	November 16, 2023	Former	
10	American	400 y ind medley	4:27.77	Morgantown, WV	November 17, 2023	Former	
11	American	200 y fly	2:08.61	Morgantown, WV	November 18, 2023	Former	
12	World	1500 m free	17:53.84	Orlando, FL	December 16, 2023	Former	
13	American	1000 y free	10:19.74	Evansville, IN	February 24, 2024	Former	
14	American	500 y free	4:57.04	Iowa City, IA	November 21, 2024	Current	
15	American	100 y back	58.18	Iowa City, IA	November 21, 2024	Current	
16	American	400 y ind medley	4:26.82	Iowa City, IA	November 22, 2024	Former	
17	American	400 y ind medley	4:24.65	Iowa City, IA	November 22, 2024	Current	
18	American	1000 y free	10:16.29	Iowa City, IA	November 23, 2024	Current	
19	World	800 m free	9:29.21	Orlando, FL	December 14, 2024	Current	
20	World	1500 m free	17:48.60	Orlando, FL	December 14, 2024	Current	
