= Berta García Grau =

Spanish para swimmer (born 2005)

Personal information
- Nationality: Spanish
- Born: 12 September 2005 (age 20)

Sport
- Sport: Para swimming
- Disability class: S5, SM5, SB4
Medal record
Women's para swimming
Representing Spain
World Championships
Bronze medal – third place	2025 Singapore	100 m breaststroke SB4

Berta García Grau (born 12 September 2005) is a Spanish para swimmer. She represented Spain at the 2024 Summer Paralympics.

== Career ==
Grau represented Spain at the 2024 Summer Paralympics. Her best finish was sixth place in the 100 metre breaststroke SB4 event. She was named the best female athlete of 2024 by the Catalan Federation of Adapted Sports. In September 2025, she competed at the 2025 World Para Swimming Championships and won a bronze medal in the 100 metre breaststroke SB4 event.
