= Iona Winnifrith =

British Paralympic swimmer

Personal information
- Born: 11 April 2011 (age 15)

Sport
- Sport: Paralympic swimming
- Disability class: S7, SM7, SB7
Medal record
Women's para-swimming
Representing Great Britain
Paralympic Games
Silver medal – second place	2024 Paris	100 m breaststroke SB7
World Championships
Silver medal – second place	2025 Singapore	100 m breaststroke SB7
Bronze medal – third place	2025 Singapore	200 m ind. medley SM7
European Championships
Gold medal – first place	2024 Funchal	100 m breaststroke SB7
Gold medal – first place	2024 Funchal	200 m ind. medley SM7
Bronze medal – third place	2024 Funchal	50 m butterfly S7

Iona Winnifrith (born 11 April 2011) is a British para swimmer, who won silver in the 100 m breaststroke SB7 at the 2024 Summer Paralympics in Paris.
