= Débora Carneiro =

Brazilian Paralympic swimmer

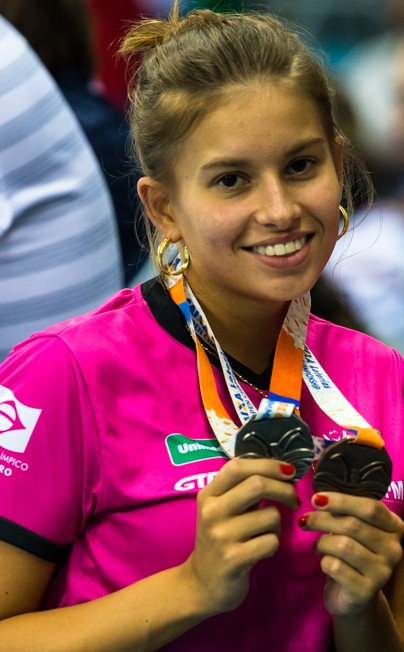
- Carneiro in 2016

Personal information
- Full name: Débora Borges Carneiro
- Born: 7 May 1998 (age 28) Maringá, Brazil
- Height: 168 cm (5 ft 6 in)
- Weight: 56 kg (123 lb)

Sport
- Country: Brazil
- Sport: Paralympic swimming
- Disability class: S14
Medal record
Paralympic swimming
Representing Brazil
Paralympic Games
Silver medal – second place	2024 Paris	100 m breaststroke SB14
Bronze medal – third place	2020 Tokyo	mixed 4 × 100 m freestyle relay S14
World Championships
Gold medal – first place	2023 Manchester	100m breaststroke SB14
Silver medal – second place	2019 London	100m breaststroke SB14
Silver medal – second place	2025 Singapore	100m breaststroke SB14
Bronze medal – third place	2022 Madeira	100m breaststroke SB14
Parapan American Games
Gold medal – first place	2019 Lima	100m breaststroke SB14
Silver medal – second place	2019 Lima	200m individual medley SM14

Débora Borges Carneiro (born 7 May 1998) is a Brazilian Paralympic swimmer who competes in international elite competitions. She competed at the 2020 Summer Paralympics, in Mixed 4 x 100 metre S14, winning a bronze medal.

== Career ==
She competed at the 2019 World Championship in the SB14 100m breaststroke, winning the bronze medal. She competes in swimming with her twin sister Beatriz Carneiro.
