= Daria Lukianenko =

Russian Paralympic swimmer

Personal information
- Native name: Дарья Лукьяненко
- Full name: Darya Alekseyevna Lukyanenko
- Nationality: Russian
- Born: Дарья Алексеевна Лукьяненко; 18 May 2002 (age 24) Shakhty, Russia

Sport
- Sport: Paralympic swimming
- Disability class: S12, SB12, SM12
Medal record
Women's para swimming
Representing RPC
Paralympic Games
Silver medal – second place	2020 Tokyo	100 m breaststroke SB12
Representing Neutral Paralympic Athletes
Paralympic Games
Gold medal – first place	2024 Paris	100 m freestyle S11
Gold medal – first place	2024 Paris	100 m breaststroke SB11
Gold medal – first place	2024 Paris	200 m ind. medley SM11
Bronze medal – third place	2024 Paris	400 m freestyle S11
Bronze medal – third place	2024 Paris	100 m backstroke S11
World Championships
Gold medal – first place	2025 Singapore	50 m freestyle S11
Gold medal – first place	2025 Singapore	100 m backstroke S11
Gold medal – first place	2025 Singapore	100 m breaststroke SB11
Gold medal – first place	2025 Singapore	400 m freestyle S11
Gold medal – first place	2025 Singapore	200 m ind. medley SM11
Silver medal – second place	2025 Singapore	100 m freestyle S11
European Championships
Gold medal – first place	2024 Funchal	100 m backstroke S11
Gold medal – first place	2024 Funchal	100 m breaststroke SB11
Gold medal – first place	2024 Funchal	200 m ind. medley SM11
Silver medal – second place	2024 Funchal	100 m freestyle S11
Representing Russia
World Championships
Silver medal – second place	2019 London	100 m breaststroke SB12
Bronze medal – third place	2019 London	200 m ind. medley SM13

Daria Lukianenko (Russian: Дарья Алексеевна Лукьяненко, born 18 May 2002) is a Russian Paralympic swimmer.

== Career ==
At the 2019 World Para Swimming Championships, she won a silver medal in the 100m breaststroke SB12 event and a bronze medal in the 200m individual medley SM13 event. She competed at the 2020 Summer Paralympics and won a silver medal in the 100m breaststroke SB12 event.
