= Mariia Latritskaia =

Russian para swimmer (born 2002)

Personal information
- Nationality: Russian
- Born: 10 October 2002 (age 23)

Sport
- Sport: Para swimming
- Disability class: S12
Medal record
Women's para swimming
Representing Russia
World Championships
Bronze medal – third place	2019 London	50 m freestyle S12
Bronze medal – third place	2019 London	100 m breaststroke SB12
European Championships
Bronze medal – third place	2026 Kocaeli	50 m freestyle S12
Representing Neutral Paralympic Athletes
World Championships
Gold medal – first place	2025 Singapore	100 m breaststroke SB12
European Championships
Bronze medal – third place	2024 Madeira	100 m breaststroke SB13

Mariia Latritskaia (born 10 October 2002) is a Russian para swimmer. She competed at the 2020 and 2024 Summer Paralympics.

== Career ==
Latritskaia represented Russian Paralympic Committee athletes at the 2020 Summer Paralympics and the Neutral Paralympic Athletes at the 2024 Summer Paralympics.
