= Elena Kliachkina =

Russian para swimmer (born 2005)

Personal information
- Nationality: Russian
- Born: 8 June 2005 (age 21)

Sport
- Sport: Para swimming
- Disability class: S9, SB8
Medal record
Women's para swimming
Representing Neutral Paralympic Athletes
World Championships
Bronze medal – third place	2025 Singapore	100 m breaststroke SB8
Representing Russia
European Championships
Silver medal – second place	2026 Kocaeli	50 m freestyle S9

Elena Kliachkina (born 8 June 2005) is a Russian para swimmer. She competed at the 2020 and 2024 Summer Paralympics.

== Career ==
Kliachkina represented Russian Paralympic Committee athletes at the 2020 Summer Paralympics and Neutral Paralympic Athletes at the 2024 Summer Paralympics. She competed at the 2025 World Para Swimming Championships and won a bronze medal in the 100 metre breaststroke SB8 event.
