= 2019 World Para Swimming Championships – Women's 100 metre breaststroke =

The women's 100m breaststroke events at the 2019 World Para Swimming Championships were held in the London Aquatics Centre at the Queen Elizabeth Olympic Park in London between 9–15 September.

== Medalists ==
Event	Gold	Silver	Bronze
SB4	Fanni Illés; Hungary	Giulia Ghiretti; Italy	Cheng Jiao; China
SB5	Yelyzaveta Mereshko; Ukraine	Verena Schott; Germany	Evelin Száraz; Hungary
SB6	Liu Daomin; China	Maisie Summers-Newton; Great Britain	Eleanor Simmonds; Great Britain
SB7	Tiffany Thomas Kane; Australia	Tess Routliffe; Canada	Mariia Pavlova; Russia
SB8	Brock Whiston; Great Britain	Katarina Roxon; Canada	Ellen Keane; Ireland
SB9	Chantalle Zijderveld; Netherlands	Lisa Kruger; Netherlands	Daniela Giménez; Argentina
SB11	Ma Jia; China	Liesette Bruinsma; Netherlands	Yana Berezhna; Ukraine
SB12	Elena Krawzow; Germany	Daria Lukyanenko; Russia	Mariia Latritskaia; Russia
SB13	Rebecca Redfern; Great Britain	Colleen Young; United States	Ayano Tsujiuchi; Japan
SB14	Louise Fiddes; Great Britain	Michelle Alonso Morales; Spain	Débora Carneiro; Brazil
SB14	Louise Fiddes; Great Britain	Michelle Alonso Morales; Spain	Valeriia Shabalina; Russia
