= Beatriz Carneiro =

Brazilian Paralympic swimmer

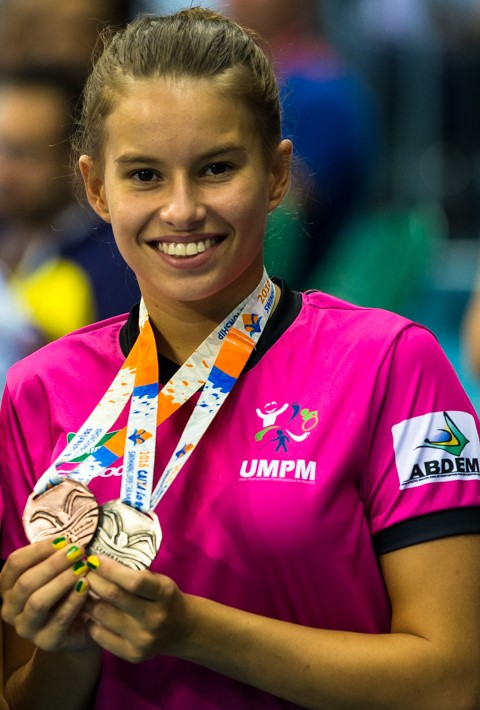
- Carneiro in 2016

Personal information
- Full name: Beatriz Borges Carneiro
- Nickname: Bia
- Born: 7 May 1998 (age 28) Maringá, Brazil
- Height: 1.69 m (5 ft 7 in)
- Weight: 58 kg (128 lb)

Sport
- Country: Brazil
- Sport: Paralympic swimming
- Disability class: S14
Medal record
Paralympic swimming
Representing Brazil
Paralympic Games
Bronze medal – third place	2020 Tokyo	100m breaststroke SB14
Bronze medal – third place	2024 Paris	100 m breaststroke SB14
Bronze medal – third place	2024 Paris	Mixed 4 × 100 m freestyle relay S14
World Championships
Silver medal – second place	2017 Mexico City	100 m breaststroke SB14
Silver medal – second place	2023 Manchester	100 m breaststroke SB14
Silver medal – second place	2025 Singapore	Mixed 4×100 m freestyle relay S14
Parapan American Games
Gold medal – first place	2019 Lima	200m individual medley SM14
Silver medal – second place	2019 Lima	100m breaststroke SB14
Bronze medal – third place	2019 Lima	200m freestyle S14

Beatriz Borges Carneiro (born 7 May 1998) is a Brazilian Paralympic swimmer who competes in international elite competitions. She competed at the 2020 Summer Paralympics, in Women's 100 metre breaststroke SB14, winning a bronze medal.

== Career ==
She competed at the 2016 Summer Paralympics in the SB14 100m breaststroke, and the S14 200m freestyle.

She is a triple Parapan American Games medalist and a World silver medalist. She competes in swimming with her twin sister Débora Carneiro.
