= Liu Daomin =

Chinese para swimmer (born 1999)

Personal information
- Nationality: Chinese
- Born: 15 March 1999 (age 27) Guizhou, China

Sport
- Sport: Para swimming
- Disability class: S6, SB6, SM6
Medal record
Women's para swimming
Representing China
Paralympic Games
Silver medal – second place	2020 Tokyo	100 m breaststroke SB6
Silver medal – second place	2024 Paris	100 m breaststroke SB6
Silver medal – second place	2024 Paris	50 m butterfly S6
Bronze medal – third place	2024 Paris	200 m ind. medley SM6
World Championships
Gold medal – first place	2019 London	100 m breaststroke SB6
Gold medal – first place	2025 Singapore	100 m breaststroke SB6
Silver medal – second place	2025 Singapore	200 m ind. medley SM6
Asian Para Games
Gold medal – first place	2022 Hangzhou	200 m ind. medley SM6
Silver medal – second place	2022 Hangzhou	50 m butterfly S6

Liu Daomin (born 15 March 1999) is a Chinese Paralympic swimmer. She represented China at the 2020 and 2024 Summer Paralympics.

== Career ==
Daomin represented China in the women's 100 metre breaststroke SB6 event at the 2020 Summer Paralympics and won a silver medal.
