= Gabriella Smith (swimmer) =

New Zealand para swimmer (born 2006)

Personal information
- Nickname: Gaby
- Born: 14 June 2006 (age 20) Perth, Australia
- Home town: Christchurch, New Zealand

Sport
- Sport: Para swimming
- Disability: Symbrachydactyly
- Disability class: S10, SB9
- Coached by: Todd Mason
Medal record
Women's para swimming
Representing New Zealand
World Championships
| Silver medal – second place | 2025 Singapore | 100 m breaststroke SB9 |

Gabriella Smith (born 14 June 2006) is a New Zealand para swimmer. She represented New Zealand at the 2024 Summer Paralympics.

== Early life ==
Smith was born in Perth, Australia, and moved to Christchurch, New Zealand in 2014. She was born with symbrachydactyly, and has half a palm and no fingers on her left hand.

== Career ==
Smith represented New Zealand at the 2024 Summer Paralympics. At 18-years old, she was the youngest Paralympian for New Zealand. In September 2025, she competed at the 2025 World Para Swimming Championships and won a silver medal in the 100 metre breaststroke SB9 event, with a personal best time of 1:19.56.
