= Nadia Báez =

Argentine Paralympic swimmer

Personal information
- Full name: Nadia Soledad Báez
- Born: 26 June 1989 (age 37) Buenos Aires, Argentina
- Home town: Morón, Argentina
- Education: Interamerican Open University
- Height: 1.72 m (5 ft 8 in)

Sport
- Country: Argentina
- Sport: Paralympic swimming
- Disability: Retinoblastoma
- Disability class: S11, SB11, SM11
- Club: Natatario Castelar Club
- Coached by: Pablo Quinteros; Juan Manuel Zucconi
Medal record
Paralympic swimming
Representing Argentina
Paralympic Games
Bronze medal – third place	2012 London	100m breaststroke SB11
World Championships
Silver medal – second place	2010 Eindhoven	100m breaststroke SB11
Silver medal – second place	2013 Montreal	100m breaststroke SB11
Silver medal – second place	2022 Madeira	100m breaststroke SB11
Bronze medal – third place	2015 Glasgow	100m breaststroke SB11
Bronze medal – third place	2023 Manchester	100m breaststroke SB11
Parapan American Games
Gold medal – first place	2019 Lima	50m freestyle S11
Gold medal – first place	2019 Lima	100m breaststroke SB11
Silver medal – second place	2023 Santiago	50m freestyle S11
Bronze medal – third place	2019 Lima	100m freestyle S11
Bronze medal – third place	2019 Lima	400m freestyle S11
Bronze medal – third place	2023 Santiago	100m breaststroke SB12
Bronze medal – third place	2023 Santiago	200m medley SM11

Nadia Soledad Báez (born 26 June 1989) is a blind Argentine Paralympic swimmer who competes in international level events. She competed at the 2012 Summer Paralympics, winning a bronze medal. She competed at the 2020 Summer Paralympics.

== Career ==
She competed at the 2007 Parapan American Games, 2011 Parapan American Games, 2010 IPC Swimming World Championships, where she won a silver medal. 2015 Parapan American Games, and 2019 Parapan American Games, where she won two gold and two bronze medals.
