= Grace Harvey =

British Paralympic Champion

Personal information
- Nationality: British
- Born: 31 August 1998 (age 27) Ware, Hertfordshire, England
- Occupations: Master of Public Health (Dental Public Health), BSc Hons UoM; Laboratory Technician

Sport
- Sport: Paralympic swimming
- Disability: Cerebral palsy affecting legs
- Disability class: SB5, SM6
- Event: Breaststroke
Medal record
Women's Para swimming
Representing Great Britain
Paralympic Games
Gold medal – first place	2024 Paris	100 m breaststroke SB5
Silver medal – second place	2020 Tokyo	100m breaststroke SB5
World Championships
Gold medal – first place	2022 Madeira	100m breaststroke SB5
Gold medal – first place	2025 Singapore	100m breaststroke SB5
Silver medal – second place	2023 Manchester	100m breaststroke SB5
Bronze medal – third place	2025 Singapore	200 m ind. medley SM6
Representing England
Commonwealth Games
Silver medal – second place	2022 Birmingham	100m breaststroke SB6

Grace Harvey (born 31 August 1998) is a British Paralympic swimmer, and European and British record holder, who specializes in the breaststroke.

== Career ==
Harvey is a British para-swimmer competing in the S6 SB5 SM6 classification for swimmers with a physical impairment. Grace's home town is Ware, Hertfordshire. She learnt to swim when aged four and she took it up as a sport to control the symptoms of cerebral palsy which caused her legs to spasm. She decided that she wanted to be an athlete after she watched the 2004 Summer Paralympics. Harvey is supported by National Lottery funding.

Harvey's favourite competition location is Sheffield at the Ponds Forge sports centre. In April 2021 she came first in points in the freestyle swimming where she beat Maisie Summers-Newton into second place. She and Lyndon Longhorne both broke European records and together with Conner Morrison they were all early picks for the delayed 2020 Summer Paralympics by the selectors. While Harvey was training in Japan before the Tokyo games began she (and the BBC) was invited to Suzuka International University where she tried out a robotic walking suit that allowed her to walk for the first time. She found the experience "overwhelming" but later that day she cried realising that this might be the first and last time and that she now knew a pleasure that she had never known, but could now miss.

In August 2022 she won a silver medal at the Commonwealth Games in Birmingham by swimming the Women's 100m Breaststroke SB6.

At the 2025 World Para Swimming Championships in Singapore, Harvey won two medals. She took gold in the women's 100 m breaststroke SB5 and bronze in the women's 200 m individual medley SM6.
