= Paula Novina =

Croatian Paralympic swimmer (born 2003)

Personal information
- Born: 4 December 2003 (age 22) Zagreb, Croatia

Sport
- Sport: Paralympic swimming
- Disability: Spastic diparesis
- Disability class: S8
Medal record
Representing Croatia
European Championships
Bronze medal – third place	2024 Funchal	50m freestyle S8

Paula Novina (born 4 December 2003) is a Croatian Paralympic swimmer who competes in international swimming competitions. She is a European bronze medalist and has competed at the 2020 and 2024 Summer Paralympics.
