= Rebecca Redfern =

British Paralympic swimmer

Rebecca Redfern MBE
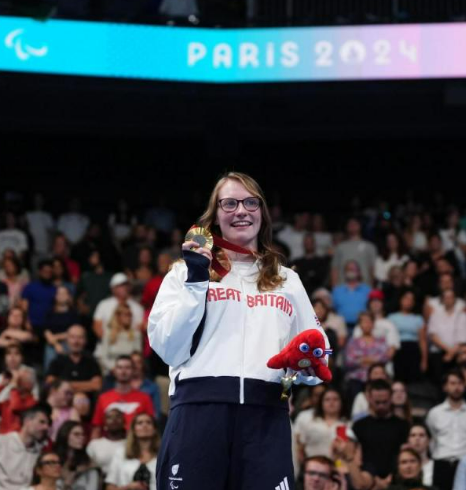
- Rebecca at Paris 2024 Paralympics

Personal information
- Nickname: Becky
- National team: Great Britain
- Born: 19 December 1999 (age 26) Droitwich Spa, England

Sport
- Sport: Swimming
- Strokes: Breaststroke
- Classifications: S13, SB13, SM13
- Club: Worcester Swimming Club
- Coach: Mark Stowe
Medal record
Women's swimming
Representing Great Britain
Paralympic Games
Gold medal – first place	2024 Paris	100 m breaststroke SB13
Silver medal – second place	2016 Rio de Janeiro	100m Breaststroke SB13
Silver medal – second place	2020 Tokyo	100m Breaststroke SB13
World Championships
Gold medal – first place	2019 London	100m breaststroke SB13
Gold medal – first place	2023 Manchester	100m breaststroke SB13
Bronze medal – third place	2022 Madeira	100m breaststroke SB13
European Championships
Silver medal – second place	2016 Funchal	100m Breaststroke SB13
GB Para Swimming International
Gold medal – first place	2015 Glasgow	100m Breaststroke MC
Silver medal – second place	2022 Aberdeen	100m Breaststroke MC
Bronze medal – third place	2016 Glasgow	100m Breaststroke MC
Bronze medal – third place	2023 Sheffield	100m Breaststroke MC

Rebecca Katharine Redfern MBE (born 19 December 1999) is a British visually impaired para-swimmer from Droitwich who competes in S13/SB13/SM13 disability categories. She has held British, European and World records in SB13 100m breaststroke.

== Personal life ==
Rebecca Redfern is the daughter of Katharine and Steve Redfern, and has three brothers, Anthony, Matthew and Nathan, all of whom have also swum competitively. Rebecca attended sixth form at Droitwich Spa High School where she studied A Levels in Maths, Business, and Psychology, and has subsequently graduated from the University of Worcester with an honours degree in Primary Initial Teacher Education.

When Rebecca was 7 she was diagnosed with a degenerative eye condition known as retinitis pigmentosa, and now has grossly impaired visual fields with no peripheral vision and poor frontal vision.

Rebecca is a member of Worcester Swimming Club and trains up to 16 hours per week in the pool plus four hours in the gym. She represents Worcester Swimming Club at club, county, regional and national level, as well as representing her country at international level.

In September 2019, Rebecca's life started a major cycle of change when she discovered she was pregnant, and in fact had been in the early stages of pregnancy when winning World Championship gold in London. In July 2020, almost 3 weeks after his due date, baby Patrick was born. This didn't keep Rebecca out of the water though, and 8 weeks after the birth she was back onto the training programme at Worcester, albeit a reduced programme due to the COVID-19 pandemic. She took a difficult decision to defer the latter stages of her university degree to focus on swimming, targeting qualification for the Tokyo Paralympics.

Alongside her successes in the pool, Rebecca has undertaken a significant programme of voluntary work throughout Worcestershire schools and societies, generally meeting with children under her strapline of "Inspiring the current and next generations". Since 2016, Rebecca has attended over 100 events, either opening new facilities, handing out medals at sports events, talking in school assemblies, or contributing to campaign videos. It is estimated that through this voluntary work, she will have reached in excess of 10,000 school children in various capacities.

Rebecca is also the patron of Worcestershire charity Sight Concern.

In the 2024 King's Birthday Honours, Rebecca was appointed a Member of the Order of the British Empire, for services to young people and to the community in Worcestershire, her investiture being conducted by the Prince Of Wales at Windsor Castle in November 2024.

In recognition of her sporting successes and her general contributions to her home town, Rebecca was instated as a Freeman of Droitwich Spa in February 2025.

In March 2026, Rebecca gave birth to her second child when baby Elsie was born. Within 8 weeks of the birth she was back in training for the 2026 Commonwealth Games for which she was subsequently selected.

== Swimming career ==
Rebecca has been a competitive swimmer since age 9 but didn't enter the para-swimming world until 14 when she was spotted by the British Swimming Vision for Rio programme in September 2014.

On 3 May 2016 Rebecca made her international debut at the 2016 IPC Swimming European Championships in Funchal, Portugal, claiming a silver medal and narrowly missing out on gold to Elena Krawzow (Germany) by 0.02 seconds.

Rebecca achieved the consideration time for the 2016 Rio Paralympics at the 2016 British Para-Swimming International Meet in Glasgow, UK where she set a new world record of 1:16.86 in the process, beating the one set 14 years previously by Kirby Cote of Canada.

She made her Paralympic debut when she represented Great Britain at the 2016 Rio Paralympics. She swam a time of 1:13.81 which was over two seconds inside her own world record, although she finished second behind Fotimakhon Amilova of Uzbekistan who set a new world record of 1:12.45. Rebecca's time also claimed the Worcestershire county record as an able bodied swimmer, and the IPC European record.

2017 was a frustrating year for Rebecca, when having achieved the British Swimming qualifying standard for the Para Swimming World Championships at the GB Summer National Championships in Sheffield in July 2017, the Mexican earthquake disaster meant that the Para Swimming World Championships were postponed, and British Swimming elected not to send a team to the rescheduled event. However Rebecca was able to end the year well by breaking the short course world record for SB13 100m Breaststroke when she swam 1:14.80 at the Short Course Para Nationals in Manchester in December, beating the previous mark set by Kirby Cote of Canada in 2002.

2018 was equally frustrating. Rebecca qualified for the European Championships in Dublin, however the SB13 100m Breaststroke event was demoted to a non medal event due to limited number of entrants. Rebecca won the non medal event in a time of 1:15.99, her best since Rio.

In April 2019, Rebecca qualified for the 2019 Para Swimming World Championships. This event was originally planned for Malaysia, but due to political reasons it needed a new venue. Luckily for British athletes the revised venue was eventually determined to be London during September 2019. where the swimmers would return to the scene of the hugely successful 2012 London Paralympics. At the World Championships, Rebecca experienced her first taste of international glory when she beat Colleen Young of USA into second place to take the gold medal and title of world champion.

Having taken time out following the birth of baby Patrick in July 2020, Rebecca's return to training was hampered by the COVID-19 pandemic, however with assistance from Bedfordshire Hot Tubs and the short-term lease of a Swim Spa, she was able to continue her training in the garden at home whilst waiting for pools to re-open. This helped her prepare for the British Para Swimming International Meet in Sheffield in April 2021 where she swam inside the GB consideration time for the Tokyo Paralympics in the heat of the SB13 100m Breaststroke, and then bettered that performance in the final, swimming a time of 1:18.28, a full three seconds below the consideration time. Rebecca then had three months in a restricted club programme to prepare for the Paralympic Games in August 2021, having had her selection confirmed at the end of June 2021.

Rebecca's Paralympic success continued at the Tokyo2020 games when she qualified for the final of the SB13 100m Breaststroke in second place behind Elena Krawzow of Germany, and then finished in the silver medal position behind Krawzow in a thrilling final that saw Rebecca break the SB13 50m Breaststroke World Record with a time of 00:33.70 for the opening 50m of the race, finishing with a time of 1:14.10 for the second fastest time of her career.

In June 2022, Rebecca attended the ParaSwimming World Championships in Funchal where she swam the SB13 100m Breaststroke achieving a bronze medal after placing third behind Coleen Young and Elena Krawzow. She followed this with an appearance at the Commonwealth Games in her less favoured S13 50m Freestyle where she placed 5th in the final. She also had the honour of carrying the Queen's Baton on a Dragon Boat along the River Severn in Worcester during the Queen's Baton Relay in the build up to the Games.

2023 saw Rebecca return to World Championship competition in the UK at the Manchester event in August. Although she was not able to better the championship record that she set in London in 2019, her time of 1:15.01 was enough to take gold and reclaim her title of World Champion, beating Coleen Young into second place.

In September 2024, Rebecca swam for the first time alongside her brother Matthew as they competed together in the mixed 4x100 VI Freestyle Relay, finishing 4th and breaking the British record by over 4 seconds. Rebecca then went on to win her first Paralympics gold medal in the 100 m breaststroke SB13 at the 2024 Summer Paralympics in a time of 1:16.02, beating Olivia Chambers and Colleen Young, both of USA, in to second and third places respectively.
