= Maisie Summers-Newton =

British Paralympic swimmer (born 2002)

Maisie Summers-Newton MBE PLY
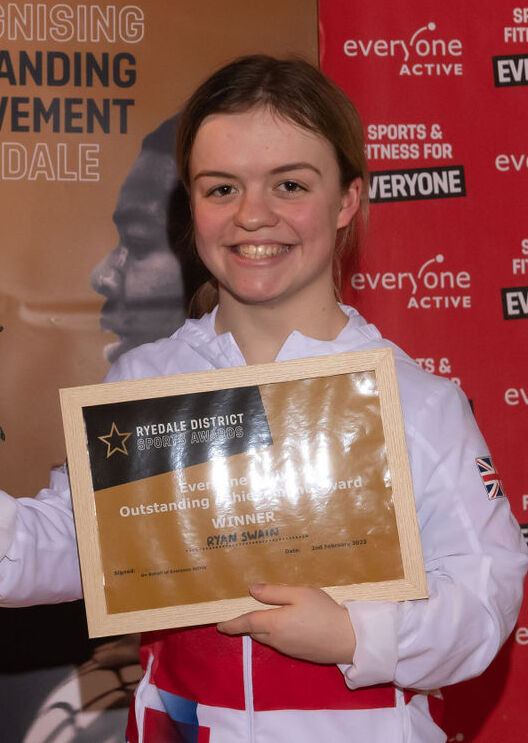
- Maisie Summers-Newton

Personal information
- Nationality: British
- Born: 26 July 2002 (age 24) Northamptonshire, England

Sport
- Country: Great Britain
- Sport: Para swimming
- Disability: Achondroplasia
- Disability class: S6
- Events: freestyle, individual medley, breaststroke
- Club: Northampton Swimming Club
Medal record
Representing Great Britain
Women's Swimming
Paralympic Games
Gold medal – first place	2020 Tokyo	200 m ind. medley SM6
Gold medal – first place	2020 Tokyo	100 m breaststroke SB6
Gold medal – first place	2024 Paris	100 m breaststroke SB6
Gold medal – first place	2024 Paris	200 m ind. medley SM6
Bronze medal – third place	2024 Paris	400 m freestyle S6
World Championships
Gold medal – first place	2019 London	200 m ind. medley SM6
Gold medal – first place	2022 Madeira	200 m ind. medley SM6
Gold medal – first place	2022 Madeira	400 m freestyle S6
Gold medal – first place	2022 Madeira	100 m breaststroke SB6
Gold medal – first place	2023 Manchester	200 m ind. medley SM6
Gold medal – first place	2023 Manchester	100 m breaststroke SB6
Silver medal – second place	2019 London	100 m breaststroke SB6
Silver medal – second place	2023 Manchester	400 m freestyle S6
Bronze medal – third place	2019 London	100 m freestyle S6
European Championships
Gold medal – first place	2018 Dublin	200 m ind. medley SM6
Gold medal – first place	2018 Dublin	100 m breaststroke SB6
Gold medal – first place	2018 Dublin	4×100 m medley 34pts
Gold medal – first place	2024 Madeira	100 m breaststroke SB6
Gold medal – first place	2024 Madeira	200 m ind. medley SM6
Silver medal – second place	2024 Madeira	400 m freestyle S6
Bronze medal – third place	2018 Dublin	400 m freestyle S6
Bronze medal – third place	2024 Madeira	50 m butterfly S6
Representing England
Commonwealth Games
Gold medal – first place	2022 Birmingham	100 m breaststroke SB6

Maisie Summers-Newton MBE PLY (born 26 July 2002) is a British Paralympic swimmer, competing in S6 disability events. In August 2018, she took gold in the IPC Swimming European Championships SM6 200m individual medley and set a new world record at 2:59.60. She also holds the S6 100m Breaststroke world record in 1:32.16 which she achieved in May 2018 at the British Para-Swimming International Meet. She won two gold medals for Great Britain at the 2020 Summer Paralympics.

== Career ==
Summers-Newton took gold at the 2019 World Para Swimming Championships in London, England. She created a new world record for the SM6 200m Individual Medley when she beat Yelyzaveta Mereshko from Ukraine. The record had been set earlier that year by Summers-Newton in Glasgow.

In April 2021, at Sheffield's Ponds Forge sports centre, Summers-Newton came second in points in the freestyle swimming to Grace Harvey and beat Ellie Simmonds by 4.2 seconds. In July, she was named as part of the Great Britain team to compete at the postponed 2020 Summer Paralympics in Tokyo, Japan. In 2021 Summers-Newton also set a European record for the 100m breaststroke SB6 with a time of 1:32.34.

At the Paralympics, she won gold in the 200m individual medley, setting a new world record of 2:56.68 in the process. She also won gold in the 100m breaststroke and fourth in the 400m freestyle.

Summers-Newton competed at the 2022 World Para Swimming Championships in Funchal, Portugal, where she won two gold medals. One in the 200m individual medley and another in the 400m freestyle. At the Mixed 4 × 100 m freestyle relay 49pts, she came 6th with Alice Tai, James Hollis and Oliver Carter. During the 100m breaststroke SB6 heats, Summers-Newton broke her own European record with a time of 1:32.16, and in the finals she got her third gold.

She won gold at the 2022 Commonwealth Games for Team England during the 100m breaststroke, with a time of 1:32.72 - 10.57 seconds ahead of second place.

At the British Para-Swimming Winter National Meet 2022 at the Tollcross International Swimming Centre in Glasgow, Summers-Newton set four new world records. They were set in the 100m freestyle (S6), 200m individual medley (SM6) and 100m breaststroke (SB6) and the 400m freestyle (S6) events.

At the 2023 World Para Swimming Championships at the Manchester Aquatics Centre, she won two gold medals and a silver medal. On 2 August she won gold in the 200m medley, a silver on 3 August in the 400m freestyle, and gold on 5 August in the 100m breaststroke, where she set a European record of 1:31.34.

Summers-Newton represented Great Britain for the second time at the 2024 Summer Paralympics in Paris, where she retained her title in the 200m individual medley with a time of 2:56.90 - 5.6 seconds faster than American swimmer Ellie Marks who won silver.

== Honours and awards ==
Summers-Newton was nominated for the 2018 BBC Young Sports Personality of the Year, joining a shortlist of ten other British athletes.

Her accounts on Instagram and Twitter are verified.

In 2021, Summers-Newton appeared in The Beano's special "BeONE" edition, alongside other sporting heroes such as Emma Raducanu and Matty Lee.

She was appointed Member of the Order of the British Empire (MBE) in the 2022 New Year Honours for services to swimming. She received the insignia from Anne, Princess Royal at Buckingham Palace on 12 October 2022.

Just before the start of the 2022 Commonwealth Games in July, Summers-Newton met Charles, Prince of Wales with Courtney Tulloch as he toured the Athletes' Village.

On 17 November 2022, she won the Citi Disability Sportswoman of the Year award.
