= Ma Jia =

Chinese Paralympic swimmer

Personal information
- Nationality: Chinese
- Born: 4 February 1998 (age 28) China

Sport
- Sport: Para swimming
- Disability class: S11, SB11, SM11
Medal record
Women's Paralympic swimming
Representing China
Summer Paralympics
Gold medal – first place	2020 Tokyo	50 m freestyle S11
Gold medal – first place	2020 Tokyo	200 m medley SM11
Gold medal – first place	2024 Paris	50 m freestyle S11
Silver medal – second place	2024 Paris	100 m breaststroke SB11
Silver medal – second place	2024 Paris	200 m medley SM11
World Championships
Gold medal – first place	2019 London	100m breaststroke SB11
Gold medal – first place	2023 Manchester	50m freestyle S11
Gold medal – first place	2023 Manchester	200m medley SM11
Silver medal – second place	2023 Manchester	100m breaststroke SB11
Bronze medal – third place	2023 Manchester	100m freestyle S11
Bronze medal – third place	2025 Singapore	100 m breaststroke SB11

Ma Jia (born 4 February 1998) is a Chinese para swimmer.

== Career ==
Ma competed in her first Paralympic games at the 2020 Summer Paralympics, where she won two gold medals in the 50 metre freestyle S11 and in the 200 metre individual medley SM11 events.
