= Elena Semechin =

German Paralympic swimmer

Personal information
- Born: 26 October 1993 (age 32) Novo-Voskresenovka (Andas batyr), Kazakhstan
- Home town: Berlin, Germany

Sport
- Country: Germany
- Sport: Paralympic swimming
- Disability: Stargardt's disease
- Disability class: S12/SB12/SM12
- Club: Berliner Schwimmteam
- Coached by: Phillip Semechin
Medal record
Women's para swimming
Representing Germany
Paralympic Games
Gold medal – first place	2020 Tokyo	100 m breaststroke SB13
Gold medal – first place	2024 Paris	100 m breaststroke SB12
Silver medal – second place	2012 London	100 m breaststroke SB13
World Championships
Gold medal – first place	2013 Montreal	100 m breaststroke SB13
Gold medal – first place	2019 London	100 m breaststroke SB13
Gold medal – first place	2023 Manchester	100 m breaststroke SB12
Silver medal – second place	2022 Madeira	100 m breaststroke SB13
Bronze medal – third place	2013 Montreal	50 m freestyle S13
European Championships
Gold medal – first place	2014 Eindhoven	100 m breaststroke SB13
Gold medal – first place	2016 Funchal	100 m breaststroke SB13
Gold medal – first place	2018 Dublin	50 m freestyle S12
Gold medal – first place	2018 Dublin	100 m breaststroke SB13
Gold medal – first place	2018 Dublin	200 m individual medley SM13
Gold medal – first place	2026 Kocaeli	100 m breaststroke SB13
Silver medal – second place	2014 Eindhoven	50 m freestyle S13
Silver medal – second place	2014 Eindhoven	200 m individual medley SM13
Silver medal – second place	2026 Kocaeli	50 m freestyle S12
Bronze medal – third place	2018 Dublin	100 m butterfly S12
Bronze medal – third place	2018 Dublin	100 m freestyle S12

Elena Semechin (born 26 October 1993 as Elena Krawzow) is a blind German Paralympic swimmer who specializes in breaststroke and freestyle. She has macular degeneration, leaving her with only 3% vision.

== Early life and career ==
Born in Novo-Voskresenovka, a village in southern Kazakhstan, Elena Krawzow emigrated with her German-Kazakhstani family, moving to Russia, where she was diagnosed with macular degeneration. Whilst in Russia, Krawzow attend a boarding school for disabled children, before resettling in Germany aged 11.

Krawzow won a silver medal in the 100m breaststroke - SB13 at the 2012 London Paralympics before finishing fifth in the same event at Rio 2016.; she went on to win the gold medal in the same category at Tokyo 2020.

== Personal life ==
In October 2020 Krawzow appeared topless on the front cover of the German edition of Playboy. She got engaged to her boyfriend Phillip Semechin in the aftermath of Tokyo 2020. In 2021 she was diagnosed with a malignant brain tumour. In 2021, she married her coach and took his last name. On September 16, 2025, they became parents of a son.
