= Evelin Száraz =

Hungarian Paralympic swimmer (born 2005)

Personal information
- Born: 21 August 2005 (age 21) Budapest, Hungary
- Height: 1.60 m (5 ft 3 in)

Sport
- Country: Hungary
- Sport: Paralympic swimming
- Disability: Cerebral palsy
- Disability class: S6
- Event: Breaststroke
- Club: Vasas SC
- Coached by: Álmos Szabó
Medal record
Paralympic swimming
Representing Hungary
World Championships
| Bronze medal – third place | 2019 London | 100m breaststroke SB5 |
| Bronze medal – third place | 2022 Madeira | 100m breaststroke SB6 |
| Bronze medal – third place | 2023 Manchester | 100m breaststroke SB6 |
European Championships
| Silver medal – second place | 2026 Kocaeli | 100m breaststroke SB6 |

Evelin Száraz (born 21 August 2005) is a Hungarian Paralympic swimmer who specializes in the breaststroke. She has won three bronze medals at the World Para Swimming Championships.
