= 2025 World Para Swimming Championships – Women's 50 metre freestyle =

The women's 50 metre freestyle events at the 2025 World Para Swimming Championships were held at the Singapore Aquatic Centre between 21 and 27 September 2025.

== Schedule ==
Women's 50 metre freestyle events will be held across the following schedule:

Women's 50 metre freestyle
Day	Date	Classifications
Day 1	21 Sept	S5; S10; S11
Day 2	22 Sept	
Day 3	23 Sept	S12
Day 4	24 Sept	
Day 5	25 Sept	S3; S4; S6; S8; S13
Day 6	26 Sept	S7
Day 7	27 Sept	S9

== Medal summary ==
Event	Gold	Silver	Bronze
S3; Details	Leanne Smith; United States	Marta Fernández Infante; Spain	Delia Fontcuberta Cervera; Spain
S4; Details	Katie Kubiak; United States	Lídia Vieira da Cruz; Brazil	Patrícia Pereira; Brazil
S5; Details	Monica Boggioni; Italy	Agáta Koupilová; Czech Republic	Natalie Örnkvist; Finland
S6; Details	Anna Hontar; Ukraine	Jiang Yuyan; China	Dearbhaile Brady; Ireland
S7; Details	Mallory Weggemann; United States	Sara Vargas Blanco; Colombia	Danielle Dorris; Canada
S8; Details	Viktoriia Ishchiulova; Individual Neutral Athletes	Zhu Hui; China	Xenia Palazzo; China
S9; Details	Mariana Ribeiro; Brazil	Alexa Leary; Australia	Christie Raleigh Crossley; United States
S10; Details	Defne Kurt; Turkey	Alessia Scortechini; Italy	Arianna Hunsicker; Canada
S11; Details	Daria Lukianenko; Individual Neutral Athletes	Karolina Pelendritou; Cyprus	Liesette Bruinsma; Netherlands
S12; Details	Carol Santiago; Brazil	Lucilene da Silva Sousa; Brazil	Ayano Tsujiuchi; Japan
S13; Details	Gia Pergolini; United States	Marian Polo López; Spain	Olivia Chambers; United States

== Race summaries ==
=== S3 ===
The women's 50 metre freestyle S3 event will be held on 25 September. Thirteen swimmers will take part, with the top eight proceeding to the final. S2 classified swimmers are also eligible to take part.

The relevant records at the beginning of the event were as follows:

Record	Athlete	Time	City	Country
S2
World	Ingrid Thunem (NOR)	0:53.94	Eindhoven	Netherlands
Championship	Pin Xiu Yip (SGP)	1:03.77	Funchal	Portugal
Americas	Fabiola Ramirez Martinez (MEX)	01:10.8	Tijuana	Mexico
Asian	Pin Xiu Yip (SGP)	01:01.0	Funchal	Portugal
European	Ingrid Thunem (NOR)	00:53.9	Eindhoven	Netherlands
S3
World	Rachael Watson (AUS)	0:39.11	Brisbane	Australia
Championship	Leanne Smith (USA)	0:40.32	Funchal	Portugal
African	Sarah Shannon (RSA)	01:20.9	Eindhoven	Netherlands
Americas	Leanne Smith (USA)	00:40.0	Indianapolis	United States
Asian	Zulfiya Gabidullina (KAZ)	00:42.2	Rio de Janeiro	Brazil
European	Arjola Trimi (ITA)	00:40.3	Tokyo	Japan
Oceania	Rachael Watson (AUS)	00:39.1	Brisbane	Australia

==== Heats ====
Rank	Heat	Lane	Athlete	Class	Result	Notes
1	1	4	Leanne Smith (USA)	S3	42.30	Q
2	2	5	Marta Fernandez Infante (ESP)	S3	45.88	Q
3	1	5	Delia Fontcuberta Cervera (ESP)	S3	46.80	Q
4	1	3	Zoia Shchurova (AIN)	S3	58.94	Q
5	2	6	Patricia Valle Benitez (MEX)	S3	59.81	Q
6	2	3	Domiziana Mecenate (ITA)	S3	1:00.26	Q
7	1	6	Maiara Barreto (BRA)	S3	1:09.00	Q
8	2	7	Wiktoria Sobota (POL)	S3	1:09.62	Q
9	1	7	Anhelina Maltseva (UKR)	S3	1:10.64	
10	2	2	Sonja Sigurdardottir (ISL)	S3	1:11.52	
11	1	2	Aly van Wyck-Smart (CAN)	S3	1:14.22	
12	2	1	Ebrar Bilge (TUR)	S2	1:30.69	

==== Final ====
Rank	Lane	Athlete	Class	Result	Notes
1st place, gold medalist(s)	4	Leanne Smith (USA)	S3	40.42	
2nd place, silver medalist(s)	5	Marta Fernandez Infante (ESP)	S3	43.12	
3rd place, bronze medalist(s)	3	Delia Fontcuberta Cervera (ESP)	S3	47.82	
4	6	Zoia Shchurova (AIN)	S3	58.14	
5	7	Domiziana Mecenate (ITA)	S3	58.84	
6	2	Patricia Valle Benitez (MEX)	S3	1:00.96	
7	1	Maiara Barreto (BRA)	S3	1:05.54	
8	8	Wiktoria Sobota (POL)	S3	1:09.09	

=== S4 ===
The women's 50 metre freestyle S4 event will be held on 25 September. Fourteen swimmers will take part, with the top eight proceeding to the final.

The relevant records at the beginning of the event were as follows:

Record	Athlete	Time	City	Country
World	Katie Kubiak (USA)	0:36.44	Boise	United States
Championship	Tanja Scholz (GER)	0:38.09	Funchal	Portugal
African	Kat Swanepoel (RSA)	00:44.5	Limoges	France
Americas	Katie Kubiak (USA)	00:36.4	Boise	United States
Asian	Peng Qiuping (CHN)	00:42.2	London	United Kingdom
European	Tanja Scholz (GER)	00:36.9	Berlin	Germany
Oceania	Rachael Watson (AUS)	00:37.9	Brisbane	Australia

==== Heats ====
Rank	Heat	Lane	Athlete	Class	Result	Notes
1	2	4	Katie Kubiak (USA)	S4	37.78	Q, CR
2	1	4	Lídia Vieira da Cruz (BRA)	S4	40.03	Q
3	2	5	Patricia Pereira dos Santos (BRA)	S4	41.47	Q
4	2	6	Mira Larionova (AIN)	S4	41.80	Q
5	2	2	Nataliia Butkova (AIN)	S4	42.96	Q
6	1	3	Gina Boettcher (GER)	S4	43.29	Q
7	2	3	Nely Edith Miranda Herrera (MEX)	S4	44.50	Q
8	1	6	Zulfiya Gabidullina (KAZ)	S4	47.66	Q
9	2	7	Jordan Tucker (CAN)	S4	51.32	
10	1	2	Monique Schacher (SUI)	S4	51.66	
11	1	7	Yuliia Safonova (UKR)	S4	51.90	
12	2	1	Anastasiia Goncharova (AIN)	S4	52.50	
13	1	1	Brenda Anellia Larry (MAS)	S4	58.81	
	1	5	Tanja Scholz (GER)	S4		DNS

==== Final ====
Rank	Lane	Athlete	Class	Result	Notes
1st place, gold medalist(s)	4	Katie Kubiak (USA)	S4	36.83	WR
2nd place, silver medalist(s)	5	Lídia Vieira da Cruz (BRA)	S4	38.98	
3rd place, bronze medalist(s)	3	Patricia Pereira dos Santos (BRA)	S4	41.02	
4	6	Mira Larionova (AIN)	S4	41.06	
5	2	Nataliia Butkova (AIN)	S4	42.49	
6	1	Nely Edith Miranda Herrera (MEX)	S4	43.46	
7	7	Gina Boettcher (GER)	S4	43.53	
8	8	Zulfiya Gabidullina (KAZ)	S4	46.49	

=== S5 ===
The women's 50 metre freestyle S5 event was held on 21 September.

The relevant records at the beginning of the event were as follows:

Record	Athlete	Time	City	Country
World	Tully Kearney (GBR)	0:34.07	Funchal	Portugal
Championship	Tully Kearney (GBR)	0:34.07	Funchal	Portugal
African	Ayaallah Tewfick (EGY)	00:39.2	Berlin	Germany
Americas	Joana Neves (BRA)	00:37.1	Rio de Janeiro	Brazil
Asian	Zhang Li (CHN)	00:37.0	Tokyo	Japan
European	Tully Kearney (GBR)	00:34.1	Funchal	Portugal
Oceania	Sarah Hilt (AUS)	00:48.3	Berlin	Germany

==== Heats ====
Nine swimmers took part, with the top eight proceeding to the final.

Rank	Heat	Lane	Athlete	Time	Note
1	1	4	Monica Boggioni (ITA)	38.64	Q
2	1	6	Alessandra Oliveira dos Santos (BRA)	41.70	Q
3	1	5	Agata Koupilova (CZE)	42.00	Q
4	1	1	Sevilay Ozturk (TUR)	42.26	Q
5	1	3	Alisson Gobeil (CAN)	42.30	Q
6	1	7	Natalie Ornkvist (FIN)	42.45	Q
7	1	2	Elizabeth Noriega (ARG)	43.13	Q
8	1	8	Sumeyye Boyaci (TUR)	44.41	Q
9	1	0	Maria Fanouria Tziveleki (GRE)	45.62	R

==== Final ====
Rank	Lane	Athlete	Time	Note
1st place, gold medalist(s)	4	Monica Boggioni (ITA)	38.37	
2nd place, silver medalist(s)	3	Agata Koupilova (CZE)	41.27	
3rd place, bronze medalist(s)	7	Natalie Ornkvist (FIN)	41.48	
4	5	Alessandra Oliveira Dos Santos (BRA)	41.59	
5	2	Alisson Gobeil (CAN)	41.71	
6	6	Sevilay Ozturk (TUR)	42.46	
6	1	Elizabeth Noriega (ARG)	43.23	
8	8	Sumeyye Boyaci (TUR)	45.09	

=== S6 ===
The women's 50 metre freestyle S6 event was held on 25 September. Six swimmers took part in a direct final.

The relevant records at the beginning of the event were as follows:

Record	Athlete	Time	City	Country
World	Anna Hontar (UKR)	0:32.55	Manchester	United Kingdom
Championship	Anna Hontar (UKR)	0:32.55	Manchester	United Kingdom
African	Ayaallah Tewfick (EGY)	00:37.5	London	United Kingdom
Americas	Ellie Marks (USA)	00:32.9	Paris	France
Asian	Jiang Yuyan (CHN)	00:32.6	Paris	France
European	Anna Hontar (UKR)	00:32.5	Manchester	United Kingdom
Oceania	Tiffany Thomas Kane (AUS)	00:34.4	Rio de Janeiro	Brazil

==== Final ====
Rank	Lane	Athlete	Class	Result	Notes
1st place, gold medalist(s)	5	Anna Hontar (UKR)	S6	32.79	
2nd place, silver medalist(s)	4	Jiang Yuyan (CHN)	S6	32.83	
3rd place, bronze medalist(s)	2	Dearbhaile Brady (IRL)	S6	34.69	
4	3	Mayara Petzold (BRA)	S6	35.09	
5	6	Nora Meister (SUI)	S6	35.92	
6	7	Ji Zhu (CHN)	S6	36.37	

=== S7 ===
The women's 50 metre freestyle S7 event will be held on 26 September. final.

The relevant records at the beginning of the event were as follows:

Record	Athlete	Time	City	Country
World	Mallory Weggemann (USA)	0:31.64	Eindhoven	Netherlands
Championship	Mallory Weggemann (USA)	0:31.64	Eindhoven	Netherlands
African	Ann Wacuka (KEN)	00:56.6	Gold Coast	Australia
Americas	Mallory Weggemann (USA)	00:31.6	Eindhoven	Netherlands
Asian	Yajing Huang (CHN)	00:34.1	Rio de Janeiro	Brazil
European	Denise Grahl (GER)	00:32.8	Dublin	Ireland
Oceania	Jacqueline Freney (AUS)	00:32.6	London	United Kingdom

==== Heats ====
Thirteen swimmers will take part, with the top eight proceeding to the final

Rank	Heat	Lane	Athlete	Time	Note
1	2	4	Mallory Weggemann (USA)	33.23	Q
2	1	4	Sara Vargas Blanco (COL)	33.86	Q
3	1	5	Ani Palian (AIN)	33.92	Q
4	2	5	Danielle Dorris (CAN)	34.23	Q
5	2	6	Chloe Osborn (AUS)	34.66	Q
6	1	3	Iona Winnifrith (GBR)	34.73	Q
7	2	2	Anna Bogatyreva (AIN)	35.02	Q
8	2	3	Rylee Sayer (NZL)	35.07	Q
9	1	6	Leyre Orti Campos (ESP)	35.24	R
10	2	7	Somellera Mandujan (MEX)	36.75	R
11	2	1	An Nishida (JPN)	36.98	R
12	1	7	Nicola St Clair Maitland (SWE)	37.24	

==== Final ====
Rank	Lane	Athlete	Result	Notes
1st place, gold medalist(s)	4	Mallory Weggemann (USA)	32.58	
2nd place, silver medalist(s)	5	Sara Vargas Blanco (COL)	32.99	
3rd place, bronze medalist(s)	6	Danielle Dorris (CAN)	33.67	
4	7	Iona Winnifrith (GBR)	33.77	
5	3	Ani Palian (AIN)	34.10	
6	2	Chloe Osborn (AUS)	34.21	
7	8	Rylee Sayer (NZL)	34.35	
8	1	Anna Bogatyreva (AIN)	34.91	

=== S8 ===
The women's 50 metre freestyle S8 event was held on 25 September.

The relevant records at the beginning of the event were as follows:

Record	Athlete	Time	City	Country
World	Alice Tai (GBR)	0:28.97	Berlin	Germany
Championship	Alice Tai (GBR)	0:29.55	London	United Kingdom
African	Husnah Kukundakwe (UGA)	00:32.6	Indianapolis	United States
Americas	Cecília Jerônimo (BRA)	00:30.0	Manchester	United Kingdom
Asian	Jiang Shengnan (CHN)	00:30.2	Hangzhou	China
European	Alice Tai (GBR)	00:29.0	Berlin	Germany
Oceania	Maddison Elliott (AUS)	00:29.7	Rio de Janeiro	Brazil

==== Heats ====
Nine swimmers took part, with the top eight proceeding to the final

Rank	Heat	Lane	Athlete	Class	Result	Notes
1	1	6	Zhu Hui (CHN)	S8	31.58	Q
2	1	5	Viktoriia Ishchiulova (AIN)	S8	31.92	Q
3	1	3	Xenia Francesca Palazzo (ITA)	S8	32.32	Q
4	1	1	Husnah Kukundakwe (UGA)	S8	32.49	Q, AF
5	1	2	Letizia Milesi (ITA)	S8	32.68	Q
6	1	4	Alice Tai (GBR)	S8	32.76	Q wd
7	1	8	Abi Tripp (CAN)	S8	33.07	Q
8	1	7	Paula Novina (CRO)	S8	33.77	Q
9	1	0	Eunyeong Lim (KOR)	S8	36.12	Rq

*wd- withdrew

==== Final ====
Rank	Lane	Athlete	Class	Result	Notes
1st place, gold medalist(s)	5	Viktoriia Ishchiulova (AIN)	S8	31.30	
2nd place, silver medalist(s)	4	Zhu Hui (CHN)	S8	31.39	
3rd place, bronze medalist(s)	3	Xenia Francesca Palazzo (ITA)	S8	31.44	
4	6	Husnah Kukundakwe (UGA)	S8	31.93	AF
5	2	Letizia Milesi (ITA)	S8	32.48	
6	7	Abi Tripp (CAN)	S8	32.81	
7	1	Paula Novina (CRO)	S8	33.00	
8	8	Eunyeong Lim (KOR)	S8	36.36	

=== S9 ===
The women's 50 metre freestyle S9 event will be held on 27 September.

The relevant records at the beginning of the event were as follows:

Record	Athlete	Time	City	Country
World	Alexa Leary (AUS)	0:27.23	Sydney	Australia
Championship	Mariana Ribeiro (BRA)	0:27.70	Manchester	United Kingdom
African	Natalie Du Toit (RSA)	00:29.0	Manchester	United Kingdom
Americas	Christie Raleigh-Crossley (USA)	00:27.3	Paris	France
Asian	Lin Ping (CHN)	00:29.1	London	United Kingdom
European	Florianne Bultje (NED)	00:28.7	Eindhoven	Netherlands
Oceania	Alexa Leary (AUS)	00:27.2	Sydney	Australia

==== Heats ====
Ten swimmers will take part, with the top eight proceeding to the final

Rank	Heat	Lane	Athlete	Time	Note
1	1	4	Alexa Leary (AUS)	27.36	Q CR
2	1	3	Mariana Ribeiro (BRA)	27.79	Q
3	1	6	Emily Beecroft (AUS)	29.43	Q
4	1	2	Mary Jibb (CAN)	30.33	Q
5	1	7	Elena Kliachkina (AIN)	30.93	Q
6	1	1	Aleksandra Ochtera (POL)	31.07	Q
7	1	8	Johanne Froekjaer (DEN)	31.71	Q
8	1	5	Christie Raleigh-Crossley (USA)	31.80	Q
9	1	0	C Nakazibwe (UGA)	33.61	R
-	1	9	Keila De Oliveira (NAM)	DNS	

==== Final ====
Rank	Lane	Athlete	Time	Note
1st place, gold medalist(s)	5	Mariana Ribeiro (BRA)	27.60	
2nd place, silver medalist(s)	4	Alexa Leary (AUS)	27.80	
3rd place, bronze medalist(s)	8	Christie Raleigh-Crossley (USA)	29.00	
4	3	Emily Beecroft (AUS)	29.26	
5	2	Elena Kliachkina (AIN)	29.83	
6	6	Mary Jibb (CAN)	30.33	
7	7	Aleksandra Ochtera (POL)	30.65	
8	1	Johanne Froekjaer (DEN)	31.52	

=== S10 ===
The women's 50 metre freestyle S10 event was held on 21 September.

The relevant records at the beginning of the event were as follows:

Record	Athlete	Time	City	Country
World	Chen Yi (CHN)	0:27.10	Paris	France
Championship	Aurelie Rivard (CAN)	0:27.50	London	United Kingdom
African	Shireen Sapiro (RSA)	00:30.9	London	United Kingdom
Americas	Aurelie Rivard (CAN)	00:27.4	Rio de Janeiro	Brazil
Asian	Chen Yi (CHN)	00:27.1	Paris	France
European	Anastasiia Gontar (IPC)	00:27.4	Tokyo	Japan
Oceania	Sophie Pascoe (NZL)	00:27.7	Rio de Janeiro	Brazil

==== Heats ====
Nine swimmers took part, with the top eight proceeding to the final.

Rank	Heat	Lane	Athlete	Time	Note
1	1	7	Defne Kurt (TUR)	27.34	Q CR
2	1	3	Emeline Pierre (FRA)	28.35	Q
3	1	4	Alessia Scortechini (ITA)	28.42	Q
4	1	5	María Barrera Zapata (COL)	28.75	Q
5	1	2	Arianna Hunsicker (CAN)	28.89	Q
6	1	1	Katie Cosgriffe (CAN)	29.22	Q
7	1	6	Elizaveta Sidorenko (AIN)	29.31	Q
8	1	8	Susannah Kaul (EST)	29.99	Q
9	1	0	Nini Geladze (GEO)	34.97	R

==== Final ====
Rank	Lane	Athlete	Time	Note
1st place, gold medalist(s)	4	Defne Kurt (TUR)	27.21	CR
2nd place, silver medalist(s)	3	Alessia Scortechini (ITA)	27.91	
3rd place, bronze medalist(s)	2	Arianna Hunsicker (CAN)	28.59	
4	6	María Barrera Zapata (COL)	28.63	
5	5	Emeline Pierre (FRA)	28.70	
6	1	Elizaveta Sidorenko (AIN)	29.14	
6	7	Katie Cosgriffe (CAN)	29.25	
8	8	Susannah Kaul (EST)	29.95	

=== S11 ===
The women's 50 metre freestyle S11 event was held on 21 September.

The relevant records at the beginning of the event were as follows:

Record	Athlete	Time	City	Country
World	Ma Jia (CHN)	0:28.96	Paris	France
Championship	Karolina Pelendritou (CYP)	0:29.58	Funchal	Portugal
African	Renette Bloem (RSA)	00:38.0	London	United Kingdom
Americas	Anastasia Pagonis (USA)	00:30.5	Minneapolis	United States
Asian	Ma Jia (CHN)	00:29.0	Paris	France
European	Karolina Pelendritou (CYP)	00:29.6	Funchal	Portugal
Oceania	Mary Fisher (NZL)	00:31.4	Rio de Janeiro	Brazil

==== Heat ====
Ten swimmers took part, with the top eight proceeding to the final.

Rank	Heat	Lane	Athlete	Time	Note
1	1	6	Liesette Bruinsma (NED)	30.42	Q
2	1	3	Karolina Pelendritou (CYP)	30.84	Q
3	1	5	Tomomi Ishiura (JPN)	30.87	Q
4	1	7	Daria Lukianenko (AIN)	31.15	Q
5	1	2	Zhang Xiaotong (CHN)	31.52	Q
6	1	4	Ma Jia (CHN)	31.53	Q
7	1	1	Kateryna Tkachuk (UKR)	31.78	Q
8	1	8	Anastasiia Shevchenko (AIN)	31.92	Q
9	1	9	Nadia Baez (ARG)	32.15	R
10	1	0	Analuz Pellitero (ARG)	33.20	R

==== Final ====
Rank	Lane	Athlete	Time	Note
1st place, gold medalist(s)	6	Daria Lukianenko (AIN)	30.22	
2nd place, silver medalist(s)	5	Karolina Pelendritou (CYP)	30.30	
3rd place, bronze medalist(s)	4	Liesette Bruinsma (NED)	30.34	
4	3	Tomomi Ishiura (JPN)	30.71	
5	2	Zhang Xiaotong (CHN)	31.13	
6	1	Kateryna Tkachuk (UKR)	31.18	
7	7	Ma Jia (CHN)	31.28	
8	8	Anastasiia Shevchenko (AIN)	31.47	

=== S12 ===
The women's 50 metre freestyle S12 event was held on 23 September.

The relevant records at the beginning of the event were as follows:

Record	Athlete	Time	City	Country
World	Carol Santiago (BRA)	0:26.61	Berlin	Germany
Championship	Carol Santiago (BRA)	0:26.65	Manchester	United Kingdom
African	Cornelle Leach (RSA)	00:30.6	Funchal	Portugal
Americas	Carol Santiago (BRA)	00:26.6	Berlin	Germany
Asian	Ayano Tsujiuchi (JPN)	00:28.0	Yokohama	Japan
European	Oxana Savchenko (RUS)	00:26.9	London	United Kingdom
Oceania	Jenna Jones (AUS)	00:28.7	Manchester	United Kingdom

==== Heats ====
Nine swimmers will take part, with the top eight proceeding to the final.

Rank	Heat	Lane	Athlete	Class	Result	Notes
1	1	4	Carol Santiago (BRA)	S12	27.32	Q
2	1	3	Lucilene da Silva Sousa (BRA)	S12	28.10	Q
3	1	5	Ayano Tsujiuchi (JPN)	S12	28.70	Q
4	1	6	Naomi Maike Schwarz (GER)	S12	28.98	Q
5	1	2	Alessia Berra (ITA)	S12	29.56	Q
6	1	7	Mariia Latritskaia (AIN)	S12	29.68	Q
7	1	1	Astrid Carroll (GBR)	S12	30.39	Q
8	1	0	Karina Petrikovicova (SVK)	S12	30.47	Q
9	1	8	Ela Letton-Jones (GBR)	S12	31.16	

==== Final ====
Rank	Lane	Athlete	Class	Result	Notes
1st place, gold medalist(s)	4	Carol Santiago (BRA)	S12	27.29	
2nd place, silver medalist(s)	5	Lucilene da Silva Sousa (BRA)	S12	27.89	
3rd place, bronze medalist(s)	3	Ayano Tsujiuchi (JPN)	S12	28.05	
4	6	Naomi Maike Schwarz (GER)	S12	28.94	
5	2	Alessia Berra (ITA)	S12	29.06	
6	7	Mariia Latritskaia (AIN)	S12	29.46	
7	8	Karina Petrikovicova (SVK)	S12	29.78	
8	1	Astrid Carroll (GBR)	S12	29.79	

=== S13 ===
The women's 50 metre freestyle S13 event will be held on 25 September. Nine swimmers will take part, with the top eight proceeding to the final.

The relevant records at the beginning of the event were as follows:

Record	Athlete	Time	City	Country
World	Katja Dedekind (AUS)	0:26.56	Birmingham	United Kingdom
Championship	Katja Dedekind (AUS)	0:26.98	Funchal	Portugal
African	Danika Vyncke (RSA)	00:29.4	Funchal	Portugal
Americas	Kelley Becherer (USA)	00:27.5	London	United Kingdom
Asian	Fotimakhon Amilova (UZB)	00:26.9	Jakarta	Indonesia
European	Carlotta Gilli (ITA)	00:26.7	Roma	Italy
Oceania	Katja Dedekind (AUS)	00:26.6	Birmingham	United Kingdom

==== Heats ====
Rank	Heat	Lane	Athlete	Class	Result	Notes
1	1	4	Gia Pergolini (USA)	S13	27.68	Q
2	1	3	Marian Polo Lopez (ESP)	S13	27.95	Q
3	1	6	Olivia Chambers (USA)	S13	28.07	Q
4	1	2	Emma Feliu Martin (ESP)	S13	28.20	Q
5	1	5	Carlotta Gilli (ITA)	S13	28.24	Q
6	1	1	Muslima Odilova (UZB)	S13	28.63	Q
7	1	0	Mubinabonu Khalilova (UZB)	S13	28.69	Q
8	1	7	Grace Nuhfer (USA)	S13	28.77	Q
9	1	8	Danika Vyncke (RSA)	S13	30.14	

==== Final ====
Rank	Lane	Athlete	Class	Result	Notes
1st place, gold medalist(s)	4	Gia Pergolini (USA)	S13	27.28	AM
2nd place, silver medalist(s)	5	Marian Polo López (ESP)	S13	27.40	
3rd place, bronze medalist(s)	3	Olivia Chambers (USA)	S13	27.63	
4	6	Emma Feliu Martin (ESP)	S13	27.93	
5	2	Carlotta Gilli (ITA)	S13	28.02	
6	1	Mubinabonu Khalilova (UZB)	S13	28.38	
7	8	Grace Nuhfer (USA)	S13	28.42	
8	7	Muslima Odilova (UZB)	S13	28.53	
