= 2025 World Para Swimming Championships – Women's 100 metre freestyle =

The women's 100 metre freestyle events at the 2025 World Para Swimming Championships were held at the Singapore Aquatic Centre between 21 and 27 September 2025.

== Schedule ==
The 100 metre freestyle events for women will be held across the following schedule:

women's 100 metre freestyle
Day	Date	Classifications
Day 1	21 Sept	
Day 2	22 Sept	S4; S6
Day 3	23 Sept	S13
Day 4	24 Sept	S8; S9
Day 5	25 Sept	S11; S12
Day 6	26 Sept	S10
Day 7	27 Sept	S3; S5; S7

== Medal summary ==
Event	Gold	Silver	Bronze
S3; Details	Leanne Smith; United States	Marta Fernández Infante; Spain	Rachael Watson; Australia
S4; Details	Katie Kubiak; United States	Mira Larionova; Individual Neutral Athletes	Lídia Vieira da Cruz; Brazil
S5; Details	Monica Boggioni; Italy	Agáta Koupilová; Czech Republic	Natalie Örnkvist; Finland
S6; Details	Jiang Yuyan; China	Anna Hontar; Ukraine	Nora Meister; Switzerland
S7; Details	Morgan Stickney; United States	Chloe Osborn; Australia	Sara Vargas Blanco; Colombia
S8; Details	Alice Tai; Great Britain	Xenia Palazzo; Italy	Jessica Long; United States
S9; Details	Alexa Leary; Australia	Mariana Ribeiro; Brazil	Mary Jibb; Canada
S10; Details	Defne Kurt; Turkey	Faye Rogers; Great Britain	Emeline Pierre; France
S11; Details	Liesette Bruinsma; Netherlands	Daria Lukianenko; Individual Neutral Athletes	Zhang Xiaotong; China
S12; Details	Carol Santiago; Brazil	Ayano Tsujiuchi; Japan	Lucilene da Silva Sousa; Brazil
S13; Details	Olivia Chambers; United States	Carlotta Gilli; Italy	Grace Nuhfer; United States

== Race summaries ==
=== S3 ===
The women's 100 metre freestyle S3 event will be held on 27 September. S2 swimmers are also eligible for this event.

The relevant records at the beginning of the event were as follows:

Record	Athlete	Time	City	Country
S2
World	Ingrid Thunem (NOR)	1:56.51	Eindhoven	Netherlands
Championship	Ganna Ielisavetska (UKR)	2:16.95	Montreal	Canada
Americas	Haidee Viviana Aceves Perez (MEX)	02:31.4	Paris	France
Asian	Pin Xiu Yip (SGP)	02:15.7	Funchal	Portugal
European	Ingrid Thunem (NOR)	01:56.5	Eindhoven	Netherlands
S3
World	Leanne Smith (USA)	1:26.76	Indianapolis	United States
Championship	Leanne Smith (USA)	1:27.62	Funchal	Portugal
African	Sarah Shannon (RSA)	02:51.5	Eindhoven	Netherlands
Americas	Leanne Smith (USA)	01:26.8	Indianapolis	United States
Asian	Zulfiya Gabidullina (KAZ)	01:30.1	Rio de Janeiro	Brazil
European	Marta Fernandez Infante (ESP)	01:30.0	Paris	France
Oceania	Rachael Watson (AUS)	01:37.8	Paris	France

==== Heats ====
Fifteen swimmers will take part, with the top eight progressing to the final.

Rank	Heat	Lane	Athlete	Time	Note
1	2	4	Leanne Smith (USA)	1:28.60	Q CR
2	2	5	Rachael Watson (AUS)	1:33.10	Q
3	1	4	Marta Fernandez Infante (ESP)	1:37.77	Q
4	1	5	Delia Fontcuberta Cervera (ESP)	1:47.09	Q
5	1	3	Zoia Shchurova (AIN)	2:02.81	Q
6	2	3	Teresa Perales (ESP)	2:05.41	Q
7	1	6	Domiziana Mecenate (ITA)	2:08.35	Q
8	2	2	Patricia Valle Benitez (MEX)	2:11.53	Q
9	1	2	Aly Van Wyke-Smart (CAN)	2:28.96	R
10	1	1	Wiktoria Sobota (POL)	2:29.85	
11	2	1	Anhelina Maltseva (UKR)	2:32.31	
12	1	7	Veronika Guirenko (ISR)	2:35.15	
13	2	7	Sonja Sigurdardottir (ISL)	2:35.52	
14	2	8	Ebrar Bilge (TUR)	3:08.94	
	2	6	Arjola Trimi (ITA)	DNS	

==== Final ====
Rank	Lane	Athlete	Time	Note
1st place, gold medalist(s)	4	Leanne Smith (USA)	1:27.98	
2nd place, silver medalist(s)	3	Marta Fernandez Infante (ESP)	1:29.77	
3rd place, bronze medalist(s)	5	Rachael Watson (AUS)	1:32.40	
4	6	Delia Fontcuberta Cervera (ESP)	1:43.93	
5	7	Teresa Perales (ESP)	2:02.36	EUR (S2)
6	2	Zoia Shchurova (AIN)	2:03.42	
7	1	Domiziana Mecenate (ITA)	2:11.13	
8	8	Patricia Valle Benitez (MEX)	2:11.15	

=== S4 ===
The women's 100 metre freestyle S4 event will be held on 22 September. Eleven swimmers will take part, with the top eight progressing to the final.

The relevant records at the beginning of the event were as follows:

Record	Athlete	Time	City	Country
World	Katie Kubiak (USA)	1:17.72	Indianapolis	United States
Championship	Tanja Scholz (GER)	1:20.70	Funchal	Portugal
African	Kat Swanepoel (RSA)	01:36.1	Manchester	United Kingdom
Americas	Katie Kubiak (USA)	01:17.7	Indianapolis	United States
Asian	Peng Qiuping (CHN)	01:31.6	London	United Kingdom
European	Tanja Scholz (GER)	01:19.3	Berlin	Germany
Oceania	Rachael Watson (AUS)	01:30.5	Singapore	Singapore

==== Heats ====
Rank	Heat	Lane	Athlete	Class	Result	Notes
1	2	4	Katie Kubiak (USA)	S4	1:24.15	Q
2	1	4	Lídia Vieira da Cruz (BRA)	S4	1:30.64	Q
3	1	5	Gina Boettcher (GER)	S4	1:30.86	Q
4	2	5	Patricia Pereira dos Santos (BRA)	S4	1:32.66	Q
5	1	3	Mira Larionova (AIN)	S4	1:33.36	Q
6	2	3	Nataliia Butkova (AIN)	S4	1:35.70	Q
7	2	6	Nely Edith Miranda Herrera (MEX)	S4	1:36.80	Q
8	1	6	Monique Schacher (SUI)	S4	1:50.16	Q
9	1	2	Jordan Tucker (CAN)	S4	1:52.71	
10	2	2	Anastasiia Goncharova (AIN)	S4	1:56.49	
11	2	7	Brenda Anellia Larry (MAS)	S4	2:04.35	

==== Final ====
Rank	Lane	Athlete	Class	Result	Notes
1st place, gold medalist(s)	4	Katie Kubiak (USA)	S4	1:22.34	
2nd place, silver medalist(s)	2	Mira Larionova (AIN)	S4	1:28.97	
3rd place, bronze medalist(s)	5	Lídia Vieira da Cruz (BRA)	S4	1:29.46	
4	3	Gina Boettcher (GER)	S4	1:29.70	
5	6	Patricia Pereira dos Santos (BRA)	S4	1:33.61	
6	7	Nataliia Butkova (AIN)	S4	1:33.66	
7	1	Nely Edith Miranda Herrera (MEX)	S4	1:35.33	
8	8	Monique Schacher (SUI)	S4	1:50.72	

=== S5 ===
The women's 100 metre freestyle S5 event was held on 27 September. Ten swimmers took part, with the top eight progressing to the final.

The relevant records at the beginning of the event were as follows:

Record	Athlete	Time	City	Country
World	Tully Kearney (GBR)	1:13.34	Funchal	Portugal
Championship	Tully Kearney (GBR)	1:13.34	Funchal	Portugal
African	Ayaallah Tewfick (EGY)	01:26.6	Berlin	Germany
Americas	Joana Neves (BRA)	01:23.2	Rio de Janeiro	Brazil
Asian	Zhang Li (CHN)	01:17.8	Tokyo	Japan
European	Tully Kearney (GBR)	01:13.3	Funchal	Portugal
Oceania	Sarah Hilt (AUS)	01:43.5	Berlin	Germany

==== Heats ====
Rank	Heat	Lane	Athlete	Class	Result	Notes
1	1	4	Monica Boggioni (ITA)	S5	1:21.75	Q
2	1	5	Agáta Koupilová (CZE)	S5	1:26.96	Q
3	1	7	Natalie Örnkvist (FIN)	S5	1:32.02	Q
4	1	6	Elizabeth Noriega (ARG)	S5	1:32.08	Q
5	1	3	Maori Yui (JPN)	S5	1:33.12	Q
6	1	1	Alisson Gobeil (CAN)	S5	1:33.58	Q
7	1	8	Sevilay Ozturk (TUR)	S5	1:35.33	Q
8	1	9	Maria Fanouria Tziveleki (GRE)	S5	1:36.00	Q
9	1	2	Sumeyye Boyaci (TUR)	S5	1:37.39	
10	1	0	Alessandra Oliveira dos Santos (BRA)	S5	1:40.30	

==== Final ====
Rank	Lane	Athlete	Class	Result	Notes
1st place, gold medalist(s)	4	Monica Boggioni (ITA)	S5	1:21.75	
2nd place, silver medalist(s)	5	Agáta Koupilová (CZE)	S5	1:26.96	
3rd place, bronze medalist(s)	3	Natalie Örnkvist (FIN)	S5	1:27.70	
4	6	Maori Yui (JPN)	S5	1:31.52	
5	7	Alisson Gobeil (CAN)	S5	1:32.36	
6	6	Elizabeth Noriega (ARG)	S5	1:32.74	
7	8	Maria Fanouria Tziveleki (GRE)	S5	1:34.85	
8	1	Sevilay Ozturk (TUR)	S5	1:35.42	

=== S6 ===
The women's 100 metre freestyle S6 event will be held on 22 September. Six swimmers will take part in a direct final.

The relevant records at the beginning of the event were as follows:

Record	Athlete	Time	City	Country
World	Jiang Yuyan (CHN)	1:09.68	Paris	France
Championship	Jiang Yuyan (CHN)	1:10.86	Manchester	United Kingdom
African	Ayaallah Tewfick (EGY)	01:21.6	Funchal	Portugal
Americas	Ellie Marks (USA)	01:11.0	Paris	France
Asian	Jiang Yuyan (CHN)	01:09.7	Paris	France
European	Yelyzaveta Mereshko (UKR)	01:11.1	Tokyo	Japan
Oceania	Tiffany Thomas Kane (AUS)	01:15.0	Glasgow	United Kingdom

==== Final ====
Rank	Lane	Athlete	Class	Result	Notes
1st place, gold medalist(s)	4	Yuyan Jiang (CHN)	S6	1:09.58	WR
2nd place, silver medalist(s)	3	Anna Hontar (UKR)	S6	1:13.86	
3rd place, bronze medalist(s)	5	Nora Meister (SUI)	S6	1:14.77	
4	2	Evelin Szaraz (HUN)	S6	1:22.97	
5	6	Ayaallah Tewfick (EGY)	S6	1:24.90	
6	7	Shay Bar Nitzan (ISR)	S6	1:39.26	

=== S7 ===
The women's 100 metre freestyle S7 event was held on 27 September. Twelve swimmers took part, with the top eight progressing to the final.

The relevant records at the beginning of the event were as follows:

Record	Athlete	Time	City	Country
World	Jacqueline Freney (AUS)	1:08.03	Adelaide	Australia
Championship	Mallory Weggemann (USA)	1:08.45	Eindhoven	Netherlands
African	Ann Wacuka (KEN)	01:56.6	Nairobi	Kenya
Americas	Mallory Weggemann (USA)	01:08.4	Bismarck	United States
Asian	Yajing Huang (CHN)	01:12.8	Rio de Janeiro	Brazil
European	Giulia Terzi (ITA)	01:09.2	Tokyo	Japan
Oceania	Jacqueline Freney (AUS)	01:08.0	Adelaide	Australia

==== Heats ====
Rank	Heat	Lane	Athlete	Class	Result	Notes
1	2	4	Morgan Stickney (USA)	S7	1:11.61	Q
2	1	4	Chloe Osborn (AUS)	S7	1:17.84	Q
3	1	5	Veronika Korzhova (UKR)	S7	1:13.54	Q
4	2	5	Sara Vargas Blanco (COL)	S7	1:14.00	Q
5	2	6	Anna Bogatyreva (AIN)	S7	1:14.25	Q
6	2	3	Ahalya Lettenberger (USA)	S7	1:14.95	Q
7	1	3	Julia Gaffney (USA)	S7	1:15.67	Q
8	1	2	Leyre Orti Campos (ESP)	S7	1:16.96	Q
9	1	6	Ani Palian (AIN)	S7	1:17.10	
10	2	2	Naomi Alejandra Ortiz Mendez (MEX)	S7	1:18.45	
11	2	7	Rylee Sayer (NZL)	S7	1:18.63	
12	1	7	Naomi Somellera Mandujano (MEX)	S7	1:22.94	

==== Final ====
Rank	Lane	Athlete	Class	Result	Notes
1st place, gold medalist(s)	4	Morgan Stickney (USA)	S7	1:10.67	
2nd place, silver medalist(s)	5	Chloe Osborn (AUS)	S7	1:12.14	
3rd place, bronze medalist(s)	6	Sara Vargas Blanco (COL)	S7	1:12.49	
4	3	Veronika Korzhova (UKR)	S7	1:13.02	
5	7	Ahalya Lettenberger (USA)	S7	1:13.99	
6	2	Anna Bogatyreva (AIN)	S7	1:14.72	
7	1	Julia Gaffney (USA)	S7	1:15.21	
8	8	Leyre Orti Campos (ESP)	S7	1:17.84	

=== S8 ===
The women's 100 metre freestyle S8 event will be held on 24 September. Eleven swimmers will take part, with the top eight progressing to the final.

The relevant records at the beginning of the event were as follows:

Record	Athlete	Time	City	Country
World	Alice Tai (GBR)	1:03.66	Sheffield	United Kingdom
Championship	Alice Tai (GBR)	1:03.77	London	United Kingdom
African	Husnah Kukundakwe (UGA)	01:12.4	Indianapolis	United States
Americas	Jessica Long (USA)	01:05.6	Pasadena	United States
Asian	Zheng Tingting (CHN)	01:11.7	Jakarta	Indonesia
European	Alice Tai (GBR)	01:03.7	Sheffield	United Kingdom
Oceania	Lakeisha Patterson (AUS)	01:04.5	Brisbane	Australia

==== Heats ====
Rank	Heat	Lane	Athlete	Time	Note
1	1	4	Xenia Palazzo (ITA)	1:09.48	Q
2	2	5	Jessica Long (USA)	1:09.67	Q
3	2	4	Alice Tai (GBR)	1:10.39	Q
4	1	3	Letizia Milesi (ITA)	1:10.81	Q
5	1	5	Mariia Pavlova (AIN)	1:11.32	Q
6	2	6	Husnah Kukundakwe (UGA)	1:11.76	Q AFR
7	1	2	Abi Tripp (CAN)	1:11.96	Q
8	1	6	Mira Jeanne Maack (GER)	1:12.16	Q
9	2	3	Nahia Zudaire Borrezo (ESP)	1:12.46	R
10	2	2	Paola Ruvalcaba Nunez (MEX)	1:16.16	R
11	2	7	Ana Castro (POR)	1:17.92	

==== Final ====
Rank	Lane	Athlete	Time	Note
1st place, gold medalist(s)	3	Alice Tai (GBR)	1:05.49	
2nd place, silver medalist(s)	4	Xenia Palazzo (ITA)	1:06.75	
3rd place, bronze medalist(s)	5	Jessica Long (USA)	1:08.62	
4	6	Letizia Milesi (ITA)	1:10.09	
5	2	Mariia Pavlova (AIN)	1:11.05	
6	8	Mira Jeanne Maack (GER)	1:11.55	
7	1	Abi Tripp (CAN)	1:11.83	
8	7	Husnah Kukundakwe (UGA)	1:12.23	

=== S9 ===
The women's 100 metre freestyle S9 event was held on 24 September. Ten swimmers took part, with the top eight progressing to the final.

The relevant records at the beginning of the event were as follows:

Record	Athlete	Time	City	Country
World	Alexa Leary (AUS)	0:58.89	Sydney	Australia
Championship	Alexa Leary (AUS)	1:00.20	Manchester	United Kingdom
African	Natalie Du Toit (RSA)	01:01.1	Manchester	United Kingdom
Americas	Christie Raleigh-Crossley (USA)	01:00.2	Paris	France
Asian	Xu Jialing (CHN)	01:04.1	Hangzhou	China
European	Sarai Gascon (ESP)	01:02.8	Tokyo	Japan
Oceania	Alexa Leary (AUS)	00:58.9	Sydney	Australia

==== Heats ====
Rank	Heat	Lane	Athlete	Class	Result	Notes
1	1	4	Alexa Leary (AUS)	S9	58.95	Q, CR
2	1	6	Mary Jibb (CAN)	S9	1:04.31	Q
3	1	8	Lakeisha Patterson (AUS)	S9	1:04.97	Q
4	1	7	Emma Mecic (CRO)	S9	1:05.00	Q
5	1	3	Emily Beecroft (AUS)	S9	1:05.04	Q
6	1	5	Mariana Ribeiro (BRA)	S9	1:05.33	Q
7	1	2	Vittoria Bianco (ITA)	S9	1:05.92	Q
8	1	1	Xu Jialing (CHN)	S9	1:06.86	Q
9	1	9	Galina Basnayake (SRI)	S9	1:10.63	
10	1	0	Johanne Froekjaer (DEN)	S9	1:10.86	

==== Final ====
Rank	Lane	Athlete	Class	Result	Notes
1st place, gold medalist(s)	4	Alexa Leary (AUS)	S9	59.19	
2nd place, silver medalist(s)	7	Mariana Ribeiro (BRA)	S9	1:01.64	
3rd place, bronze medalist(s)	5	Mary Jibb (CAN)	S9	1:02.71	
4	2	Emily Beecroft (AUS)	S9	1:03.97	
5	8	Xu Jialing (CHN)	S9	1:04.45	
6	6	Emma Mecic (CRO)	S9	1:04.47	
7	3	Lakeisha Patterson (AUS)	S9	1:04.59	
8	1	Vittoria Bianco (ITA)	S9	1:05.94	

=== S10 ===
The women's 100 metre freestyle S10 event will be held on 26 September. Ten swimmers will take part, with the top eight progressing to the final.

The relevant records at the beginning of the event were as follows:

Record	Athlete	Time	City	Country
World	Aurelie Rivard (CAN)	0:58.14	Tokyo	Japan
Championship	Aurelie Rivard (CAN)	0:59.43	Funchal	Portugal
African	Shireen Sapiro (RSA)	01:07.4	London	United Kingdom
Americas	Aurelie Rivard (CAN)	00:58.1	Tokyo	Japan
Asian	Zhang Meng (CHN)	01:01.5	Paris	France
European	Chantalle Zijderveld (NED)	01:00.2	Tokyo	Japan
Oceania	Sophie Pascoe (NZL)	00:59.8	Auckland	New Zealand

==== Heats ====
Rank	Heat	Lane	Athlete	Time	Note
1	1	8	Defne Kurt (TUR)	59.11	Q CR
2	1	4	Emeline Pierre (FRA)	1:01.48	Q
3	1	5	Faye Rogers (GBR)	1:01.58	Q
4	1	6	María Barrera Zapata (COL)	1:02.57	Q
5	1	7	Arianna Hunsicker (CAN)	1:03.43	Q
6	1	3	Alessia Scortechini (ITA)	1:03.92	Q
7	1	1	Poppy Wilson (AUS)	1:05.10	Q
8	1	9	Oliwia Jablonska (POL)	1:05.36	Q
9	1	0	Elizaveta Sidorenko (AIN)	1:05.47	R

==== Final ====
Rank	Lane	Athlete	Time	Note
1st place, gold medalist(s)	4	Defne Kurt (TUR)	59.08	CR
2nd place, silver medalist(s)	3	Faye Rogers (GBR)	1:00.46	
3rd place, bronze medalist(s)	5	Emeline Pierre (FRA)	1:00.97	
4	7	Alessia Scortechini (ITA)	1:02.43	
5	6	Maria Barrera Zapata (COL)	1:02.46	
6	2	Arianna Hunsicker (CAN)	1:03.69	
7	1	Poppy Wilson (AUS)	1:04.21	
8	8	Oliwia Jablonska (POL)	1:04.67	

=== S11 ===
The women's 100 metre freestyle S11 event will be held on 25 September. Seven swimmers will take part in a direct final.

The relevant records at the beginning of the event were as follows:

Record	Athlete	Time	City	Country
World	Daria Lukianenko (IPC)	1:04.88	Paris	France
Championship	Liesette Bruinsma (NED)	1:05.75	Manchester	United Kingdom
African	Renette Bloem (RSA)	01:25.7	London	United Kingdom
Americas	Anastasia Pagonis (USA)	01:06.2	Indianapolis	United States
Asian	Li Guizhi (CHN)	01:05.9	Tokyo	Japan
European	Daria Lukianenko (IPC)	01:04.9	Paris	France
Oceania	Mary Fisher (NZL)	01:09.5	Rio de Janeiro	Brazil

==== Final ====
Rank	Lane	Athlete	Time	Note
1st place, gold medalist(s)	5	Liesette Bruinsma (NED)	1:06.51	
2nd place, silver medalist(s)	4	Daria Lukianenko (AIN)	1:06.75	
3rd place, bronze medalist(s)	3	Xiaotong Zhang (CHN)	1:09.13	
4	6	Tomomi Ishiura (JPN)	1:10.10	
5	1	Varvara Kniazeva (AIN)	1:10.58	
6	7	Kateryna Tkachuk (UKR)	1:11.38	
7	2	Anastasiia Shevchenko (AIN)	1:12.70	

=== S12 ===
The women's 100 metre freestyle S12 event will be held on 23 September.

The relevant records at the beginning of the event were as follows:

Record	Athlete	Time	City	Country
World	Oxana Savchenko (RUS)	0:58.41	London	United Kingdom
Championship	Carol Santiago (BRA)	0:58.87	Manchester	United Kingdom
African	Alani Ferreira (RSA)	01:07.9	Manchester	United Kingdom
Americas	Carol Santiago (BRA)	00:58.8	São Paulo	Brazil
Asian	Zhu Hongyan (CHN)	01:00.0	Madrid	Spain
European	Oxana Savchenko (RUS)	00:58.4	London	United Kingdom
Oceania	Jenna Jones (AUS)	01:03.0	Manchester	United Kingdom

==== Heats ====
Twelve swimmers will take part, with the top eight progressing to the final

Rank	Heat	Lane	Athlete	Class	Time	Notes
1	1	4	Ayano Tsujiuchi (JPN)	S12	1:02.01	Q
2	2	4	Carol Santiago (BRA)	S12	1:02.06	Q
3	2	3	Lucilene Da Silva Sousa (BRA)	S12	1:02.66	Q
4	1	5	Maria Delgado Nadal (ESP)	S12	1:02.86	Q
5	1	3	Naomi Maike Schnittger (GER)	S12	1:03.03	Q
6	2	5	Alessia Berra (ITA)	S12	1:04.46	Q
7	2	6	Karina Petrikovicova (SVK)	S12	1:05.92	Q
8	1	2	Ela Letton-Jones (GBR)	S12	1:06.76	Q
9	2	2	Astrid Carroll (GBR)	S12	1:06.96	
10	1	6	Mariia Latritskaia (AIN)	S12	1:07.17	
11	1	7	Jietong Zheng (CHN)	S12	1:08.49	
	2	7	Belkys Mota (VEN)	S12	DNS	

==== Final ====
Rank	Lane	Athlete	Time	Notes
1st place, gold medalist(s)	5	Carol Santiago (BRA)	1:00.51	
2nd place, silver medalist(s)	4	Ayano Tsujiuchi (JPN)	1:00.73	
3rd place, bronze medalist(s)	3	Lucilene Da Silva Sousa (BRA)	1:01.21	
4	6	Maria Delgado Nadal (ESP)	1:02.25	
5	2	Naomi Maike Schnittger (GER)	1:03.03	
6	7	Alessia Berra (ITA)	1:03.06	
7	1	Karina Petrikovicova (SVK)	1:04.82	
8	8	Ela Letton-Jones (GBR)	1:06.89	

=== S13 ===
The women's 100 metre freestyle S13 event was held on 23 September.

The relevant records at the beginning of the event were as follows:

Record	Athlete	Time	City	Country
World	Carlotta Gilli (ITA)	0:57.34	Roma	Italy
Championship	Carlotta Gilli (ITA)	0:58.79	London	United Kingdom
African	Danika Vyncke (RSA)	01:05.5	Paris	France
Americas	Valerie Grand-Maison (CAN)	00:58.9	Beijing	China
Asian	Fotimakhon Amilova (UZB)	00:58.7	Jakarta	Indonesia
European	Carlotta Gilli (ITA)	00:57.3	Roma	Italy
Oceania	Katja Dedekind (AUS)	00:59.5	Manchester	United Kingdom

==== Heats ====
Eleven swimmers took part, with the top eight progressing to the final.

Rank	Heat	Lane	Athlete	Time	Note
1	2	5	Olivia Chambers (USA)	1:01.10	Q
2	1	5	Gia Pergolini (USA)	1:01.20	Q
3	2	6	Marian Polo Lopez (ESP)	1:01.93	Q
4	2	3	Grace Nuhfer (USA)	1:01.96	Q
5	1	4	Emma Feliu Martin (ESP)	1:02.27	Q
6	2	4	Carlotta Gilli (ITA)	1:02.48	Q
7	1	3	Aleksandra Ziablitseva (AIN)	1:02.64	Q
8	1	6	Ariadna Edo Beltran (ESP)	1:04.60	Q
9	1	2	Mubinabonu Khalilova (UZB)	1:05.14	R
10	2	2	Danika Vyncke (RSA)	1:06.96	R
11	2	7	Alani Ferreira (RSA)	1:09.33	

==== Final ====
Rank	Lane	Athlete	Time	Note
1st place, gold medalist(s)	4	Olivia Chambers (USA)	1:00.11	
2nd place, silver medalist(s)	7	Carlotta Gilli (ITA)	1:00.57	
3rd place, bronze medalist(s)	6	Grace Nuhfer (USA)	1:00.72	
4	5	Gia Pergolini (USA)	1:00.74	
5	3	Marian Polo Lopez (ESP)	1:00.77	
6	2	Emma Feliu Martin (ESP)	1:01.15	
7	1	Aleksandra Ziablitseva (AIN)	1:01.78	
8	8	Ariadna Edo Beltran (ESP)	1:04.66	
