= 2025 World Para Swimming Championships – Women's 200 metre freestyle =

The women's 200 m freestyle events at the 2025 World Para Swimming Championships were held at the Singapore Aquatic Centre between 21 and 27 September 2025. Five events over six classifications will tke place.

== Schedule ==
The 200 metre freestyle events for women will be held across the following schedule:

women's 200 m freestyle
Day	Date	Classifications
Day 1	21 Sept	S14
Day 2	22 Sept	
Day 3	23 Sept	
Day 4	24 Sept	S2
Day 5	25 Sept	
Day 6	26 Sept	S3; S5
Day 7	27 Sept	S4

== Medal summary ==
Event	Gold	Silver	Bronze
S2; Details	Arjola Trimi; Italy	Teresa Perales; Spain	Fabiola Ramírez; Mexico
S3; Details	Leanne Smith; United States	Delia Fontcuberta Cervera; Spain	Patricia Valle; Mexico
S4; Details	Katie Kubiak; United States	Gina Böttcher; Germany	Mira Larionova; Individual Neutral Athletes
S5; Details	Monica Boggioni; Italy	Agáta Koupilová; Czech Republic	Natalie Örnkvist; Finland
S14; Details	Poppy Maskill; Great Britain	Valeriia Shabalina; Individual Neutral Athletes	Louise Fiddes; Great Britain

== Race summaries ==
=== S2 ===
The women's 200 metre freestyle S2 event was held on 24 September. Seven swimmers will take part in a direct final. This event is also open to S1 swimmers.

The relevant records at the beginning of the event were as follows:

Record	Athlete	Time	City	Country
S1
World	Ingrid Thunem (NOR)	3:59.02	Kristiansand	Norway
Championship	Danielle Watts (GBR)	6:03.90	Durban	South Africa
Americas	Kayla Wheeler (USA)	06:00.6	Minneapolis	United States
European	Ingrid Thunem (NOR)	03:59.0	Kristiansand	Norway
S2
World	Arjola Trimi (ITA)	4:35.36	Naples	Italy
Championship	Ganna Ielisavetska (UKR)	5:06.38	Eindhoven	Netherlands
Americas	Fabiola Ramirez Martinez (MEX)	05:22.4	Funchal	Portugal
Asian	Pin Xiu Yip (SGP)	04:41.5	Singapore	Singapore
European	Arjola Trimi (ITA)	04:35.4	Naples	Italy

==== Final ====
Rank	Lane	Athlete	Class	Result	Notes
1st place, gold medalist(s)	4	Arjola Trimi (ITA)	S2	4:24.56	WR
2nd place, silver medalist(s)	5	Teresa Perales (ESP)	S2	4:27.18	
3rd place, bronze medalist(s)	3	Fabiola Ramirez Martinez (MEX)	S2	5:12.66	AM
4	2	Haidee Viviana Aceves Perez (MEX)	S2	5:21.34	
5	6	Angela Procida (ITA)	S2	5:27.83	
6	7	Ebrar Bilge (TUR)	S2	6:09.78	
7	1	Elif Ildem (TUR)	S1	7:34.27	

=== S3 ===
The women's 200 metre freestyle S3 event was held on 26 September. Seven swimmers took part in a direct final.

The relevant records at the beginning of the event were as follows:

Record	Athlete	Time	City	Country
World	Leanne Smith (USA)	3:09.65	Indianapolis	United States
Championship	Leanne Smith (USA)	3:16.95	Funchal	Portugal
Americas	Leanne Smith (USA)	03:09.6	Indianapolis	United States
Asian	Zulfiya Gabidullina (KAZ)	03:24.5	Berlin	Germany
European	Marta Fernandez Infante (ESP)	03:13.8	Zaragoza	Spain

==== Final ====
Rank	Lane	Athlete	Class	Result	Notes
1st place, gold medalist(s)	4	Leanne Smith (USA)	S3	3:16.34	CR
2nd place, silver medalist(s)	5	Delia Fontcuberta Cervera (ESP)	S3	3:46.64	
3rd place, bronze medalist(s)	6	Patricia Valle Benitez (MEX)	S3	4:40.28	
4	3	Domiziana Mecenate (ITA)	S3	4:41.44	
5	2	Aly van Wyck-Smart (CAN)	S3	4:56.69	
6	7	Wiktoria Sobota (POL)	S3	5:08.07	
7	1	Lova Johansson (SWE)	S3	8:27.95	

=== S4 ===
The women's 200 metre freestyle S4 event was held on 27 September. Eleven swimmers took part, with the top eight progressing to the final.

The relevant records at the beginning of the event were as follows:

Record	Athlete	Time	City	Country
World	Katie Kubiak (USA)	2:44.97	Boise	United States
Championship	Tanja Scholz (GER)	2:53.02	Funchal	Portugal
Americas	Katie Kubiak (USA)	02:45.0	Boise	United States
Asian	Zulfiya Gabidullina (KAZ)	03:29.4	Jakarta	Indonesia
European	Tanja Scholz (GER)	02:51.5	Berlin	Germany
Oceania	Rachael Watson (AUS)	03:15.1	Berlin	Germany

==== Heats ====
Rank	Heat	Lane	Athlete	Class	Result	Notes
1	1	4	Katie Kubiak (USA)	S4	2:50.82	Q, CR
2	1	2	Mira Larionova (AIN)	S4	3:11.74	Q
3	1	3	Gina Boettcher (GER)	S4	3:12.68	Q
4	1	5	Lídia Vieira da Cruz (BRA)	S4	3:15.12	Q
5	1	7	Nely Edith Miranda Herrera (MEX)	S4	3:21.64	Q
6	1	6	Patricia Pereira dos Santos (BRA)	S4	3:37.00	Q
7	1	8	Jordan Tucker (CAN)	S4	4:03.94	Q
8	1	1	Anastasiia Goncharova (AIN)	S4	4:06.60	Q
9	1	0	Brenda Anellia Larry (MAS)	S4	4:37.95	

==== Final ====
Rank	Lane	Athlete	Class	Result	Notes
1st place, gold medalist(s)	4	Katie Kubiak (USA)	S4	2:52.23	
2nd place, silver medalist(s)	3	Gina Boettcher (GER)	S4	3:08.01	
3rd place, bronze medalist(s)	5	Mira Larionova (AIN)	S4	3:08.54	
4	6	Lídia Vieira da Cruz (BRA)	S4	3:12.26	
5	7	Patricia Pereira dos Santos (BRA)	S4	3:23.59	
6	1	Jordan Tucker (CAN)	S4	4:03.35	
7	8	Anastasiia Goncharova (AIN)	S4	4:05.98	
	2	Nely Edith Miranda Herrera (MEX)	S4		DSQ

=== S5 ===
The women's 200 metre freestyle S5 event will be held on 26 September. Eight swimmers will take part in a direct final.

The relevant records at the beginning of the event were as follows:

Record	Athlete	Time	City	Country
World	Tully Kearney (GBR)	2:42.36	Funchal	Portugal
Championship	Tully Kearney (GBR)	2:42.36	Funchal	Portugal
African	Ayaallah Tewfick (EGY)	03:01.1	Berlin	Germany
Americas	Mariana Guerrero Martinez (COL)	03:05.4	Guadalajara	Mexico
Asian	Zhang Li (CHN)	02:46.5	Tokyo	Japan
European	Tully Kearney (GBR)	02:42.4	Funchal	Portugal
Oceania	Sarah Hilt (AUS)	03:31.5	Berlin	Germany

==== Final ====
Rank	Lane	Athlete	Class	Result	Notes
1st place, gold medalist(s)	4	Monica Boggioni (ITA)	S5	2:48.13	
2nd place, silver medalist(s)	5	Agata Koupilova (CZE)	S5	2:58.67	
3rd place, bronze medalist(s)	6	Natalie Ornkvist (FIN)	S5	3:05.14	
4	3	Maori Yui (JPN)	S5	3:12.53	
5	2	Elizabeth Noriega (ARG)	S5	3:16.31	
6	7	Sumeyye Boyaci (TUR)	S5	3:24.59	
7	1	Maria Fanouria Tziveleki (GRE)	S5	3:26.03	
8	8	Alisson Gobeil (CAN)	S5	3:29.70	

=== S14 ===
The women's 200 metre freestyle S14 event was held on 21 September.

The relevant records at the beginning of the event were as follows:

Record	Athlete	Time	City	Country
World	Yui Lam Chan (HKG)	2:26.17	Lignano Sabbiadoro	Italy
Asian	Yui Lam Chan (HKG)	02:26.2	Lignano Sabbiadoro	Italy
European	Olivia Newman-Baronius (GBR)	02:29.5	Berlin	Germany
Oceania	Paige Leonhardt (AUS)	02:50.8	Brisbane	Australia

==== Heats ====
Ten swimmers took part, with the top eight progressing to the final.

Rank	Heat	Lane	Athlete	Class	Result	Notes
1	1	5	Poppy Maskill (GBR)	S14	2:09.87	Q
2	1	4	Valeriia Shabalina (AIN)	S14	2:11.65	Q
3	1	3	Georgia Sheffield (GBR)	S14	2:11.69	Q
4	1	6	Louise Fiddes (GBR)	S14	2:12.12	Q
5	1	7	Pernilla Lindberg (SWE)	S14	2:15.32	Q
6	1	2	Nattharinee Khajhonmatha (THA)	S14	2:16.89	Q
7	1	1	Chiu Yee Lau (HKG)	S14	2:17.77	Q
8	1	8	Ho Ying Cheung (HKG)	S14	2:18.83	Q
9	1	0	Yan Ting Danielle Moi (SGP)	S14	2:35.85	

==== Final ====
Rank	Lane	Athlete	Result	Notes
1st place, gold medalist(s)	4	Poppy Maskill (GBR)	2:06.19	
2nd place, silver medalist(s)	5	Valeriia Shabalina (AIN)	2:06.32	
3rd place, bronze medalist(s)	6	Louise Fiddes (GBR)	2:07.51	
4	3	Georgia Sheffield (GBR)	2:08.78	
5	7	Nattharinee Khajhonmatha (THA)	2:14.16	
6	2	Pernilla Lindberg (SWE)	2:14.37	
7	8	Ho Ying Cheung (HKG)	2:16.50	
8	1	hiu Yee Lau (HKG)	2:18.88	
