= 2025 World Para Swimming Championships – Women's 100 metre butterfly =

The women's 100 metre butterfly events at the 2025 World Para Swimming Championships were held at the Singapore Aquatic Centre between 21 and 27 September 2025.

== Schedule ==
The 100 metre butterfly events for women will be held across the following schedule.

women's 100 metre butterfly
Day	Date	Classifications
Day 1	21 Sept	S13
Day 2	22 Sept	S11; S12
Day 3	23 Sept	S8; S9
Day 4	24 Sept	
Day 5	25 Sept	S10
Day 6	26 Sept	
Day 7	27 Sept	S14

== Medal summary ==
Event	Gold	Silver	Bronze
S8	Alice Tai; Great Britain	Viktoriia Ishchiulova; Individual Neutral Athletes	Brock Whiston; Great Britain
S9	Xu Jialing; China	Zsófia Konkoly; Hungary	Emily Beecroft; Australia
S10	Defne Kurt; Turkey	Faye Rogers; Great Britain	Katie Cosgriffe; Canada
S12	María Delgado; Spain	Lucilene da Silva Sousa; Brazil	Alessia Berra; Italy
S13	Grace Nuhfer; United States	Carlotta Gilli; Italy	Róisín Ní Ríain; Ireland
S14	Poppy Maskill; Great Britain	Olivia Newman-Baronius; Great Britain	Valeriia Shabalina; Individual Neutral Athletes

== Race summaries ==
=== S8 ===
The women's 100 metre Butterfly S8 event will be held on 23 September. Eight swimmers will take part in a direct final.

The relevant records at the beginning of the event were as follows:

Record	Athlete	Time	City	Country
World	Stephanie Slater (GBR)	1:08.20	Eindhoven	Netherlands
Championship	Alice Tai (GBR)	1:09.76	London	United Kingdom
African	Husnah Kukundakwe (UGA)	01:25.3	Paris	France
Americas	Jessica Long (USA)	01:09.6	Berlin	Germany
Asian	Lu Weiyuan (CHN)	01:11.7	Rio de Janeiro	Brazil
European	Stephanie Slater (GBR)	01:08.2	Eindhoven	Netherlands
Oceania	Maddison Elliott (AUS)	01:13.8	Rio de Janeiro	Brazil

==== Final ====
Rank	Lane	Athlete	Class	Result	Notes
1st place, gold medalist(s)	4	Alice Tai (GBR)	S8	1:11.20	
2nd place, silver medalist(s)	3	Viktoriia Ishchiulova (AIN)	S8	1:13.65	
3rd place, bronze medalist(s)	6	Brock Whiston (GBR)	S8	1:13.71	
4	5	Jessica Long (USA)	S8	1:14.26	
5	2	Zhu Hui (CHN)	S8	1:15.02	
6	1	Zheng Tingting (CHN)	S8	1:20.79	
7	8	Ana Castro (POR)	S8	1:25.47	
8	7	Eunyeong Lim (KOR)	S8	1:26.03	

=== S9 ===
The women's 100 metre Butterfly S9 event will be held on 23 September. Ten swimmers will take part, with the top eight proceeding to the final.

The relevant records at the beginning of the event were as follows:

Record	Athlete	Time	City	Country
World	Sophie Pascoe (NZL)	1:02.48	Auckland	New Zealand
Championship	Sophie Pascoe (NZL)	1:04.35	London	United Kingdom
African	Natalie Du Toit (RSA)	01:06.7	Beijing	China
Americas	Christie Raleigh-Crossley (USA)	01:05.2	Paris	France
Asian	Xu Jialing (CHN)	01:07.9	Rio de Janeiro	Brazil
European	Zsofia Konkoly (HUN)	01:06.5	Tokyo	Japan
Oceania	Sophie Pascoe (NZL)	01:02.5	Auckland	New Zealand

==== Heats ====
Rank	Heat	Lane	Athlete	Class	Result	Notes
1	1	4	Zsofia Konkoly (HUN)	S9	1:09.38	Q
2	1	3	Florianne Bultje (NED)	S9	1:09.39	Q
3	1	5	Emily Beecroft (AUS)	S9	1:09.89	Q
4	1	1	Mary Jibb (CAN)	S9	1:11.44	Q
5	1	8	Anastasiya Dmytriv Dmytriv (ESP)	S9	1:11.50	Q
6	1	7	Xu Jialing (CHN)	S9	1:12.51	Q
7	1	2	Nuria Marques Soto (ESP)	S9	1:12.29	Q
8	1	7	Liu Ying (CHN)	S9	1:12.51	Q
9	1	0	Yuliya Gordiychuk (ISR)	S9	1:13.29	
10	1	9	Agathe Pauli (FRA)	S9	1:15.17	

==== Final ====
Rank	Lane	Athlete	Class	Result	Notes
1st place, gold medalist(s)	7	Xu Jialing (CHN)	S9	1:08.24	
2nd place, silver medalist(s)	4	Zsofia Konkoly (HUN)	S9	1:08.49	
3rd place, bronze medalist(s)	3	Emily Beecroft (AUS)	S9	1:08.65	
4	5	Florianne Bultje (NED)	S9	1:09.71	
5	6	Mary Jibb (CAN)	S9	1:10.29	
6	2	Anastasiya Dmytriv Dmytriv (ESP)	S9	1:11.08	
7	8	Liu Ying (CHN)	S9	1:11.67	
8	1	Nuria Marques Soto (ESP)	S9	1:12.62	

=== S10 ===
The women's 100 metre Butterfly S10 event was held on 22 September. Ten swimmers took part, with the top eight progressing to the final.

The relevant records at the beginning of the event were as follows:

Record	Athlete	Time	City	Country
World	Sophie Pascoe (NZL)	1:02.60	Auckland	New Zealand
Championship	Sophie Pascoe (NZL)	1:03.74	Glasgow	United Kingdom
African	Shireen Sapiro (RSA)	01:16.1	Eindhoven	Netherlands
Americas	Mikaela Jenkins (USA)	01:06.3	Glasgow	United Kingdom
Asian	Chen Yi (CHN)	01:06.9	Rio de Janeiro	Brazil
European	Faye Rogers (GBR)	01:04.2	Sheffield	United Kingdom
Oceania	Sophie Pascoe (NZL)	01:02.6	Auckland	New Zealand

==== Heats ====
Rank	Heat	Lane	Athlete	Class	Result	Notes
1	1	4	Faye Rogers (GBR)	S10	1:04.04	Q, ER
2	1	0	Defne Kurt (TUR)	S10	1:05.50	Q
3	1	5	Katie Cosgriffe (CAN)	S10	1:06.46	Q
4	1	3	Jasmine Greenwood (AUS)	S10	1:07.30	Q
5	1	7	Taylor Winnett (USA)	S10	1:08.54	Q
6	1	1	Csenge Hotz (HUN)	S10	1:09.27	Q
7	1	2	Alessia Scortechini (ITA)	S10	1:10.14	Q
8	1	6	Poppy Wilson (AUS)	S10	1:10.43	Q
9	1	8	Oliwia Jablonska (POL)	S10	1:11.97	
10	1	9	Silvana Lopez Moreno (MEX)	S10	1:16.52	

==== Final ====
Rank	Lane	Athlete	Class	Result	Notes
1st place, gold medalist(s)	5	Defne Kurt (TUR)	1:03.91	S10	ER
2nd place, silver medalist(s)	4	Faye Rogers (GBR)	S10	1:03.94	
3rd place, bronze medalist(s)	3	Katie Cosgriffe (CAN)	S10	1:05.82	AM
4	6	Jasmine Greenwood (AUS)	S10	1:05.84	
5	2	Taylor Winnett (USA)	S10	1:08.04	
6	8	Poppy Wilson (AUS)	S10	1:09.14	
7	7	Csenge Hotz (HUN)	S10	1:09.40	
8	1	Alessia Scortechini (ITA)	S10	1:09.65	

=== S12 ===
The women's 100 metre Butterfly S12 event will be held on 22 September. Sox swimmers will take part in a direct final.

The relevant records at the beginning of the event were as follows:

Record	Athlete	Time	City	Country
Championship	Joanna Mendak (POL)	1:03.78	Durban	South Africa
African	Alani Ferreira (RSA)	01:18.3	Manchester	United Kingdom
Americas	Rebecca Meyers (USA)	01:04.2	Cairns	Australia
Asian	Zhu Hongyan (CHN)	01:06.6	Athens	Greece
European	Joanna Mendak (POL)	01:03.1	Berlin	Germany
Oceania	Mary Fisher (NZL)	01:19.6	Edmonton, Alberta	Canada

==== Final ====
Rank	Lane	Athlete	Class	Result	Notes
1st place, gold medalist(s)	4	Maria Delgado Nadal (ESP)	S12	1:06.62	
2nd place, silver medalist(s)	5	Lucilene da Silva Sousa (BRA)	S12	1:08.02	
3rd place, bronze medalist(s)	3	Alessia Berra (ITA)	S12	1:08.19	
4	6	Zheng Jietong (CHN)	S12	1:12.80	
5	2	Ela Letton-Jones (GBR)	S12	1:19.00	
		Varvara Kniazeva (AIN)	S11		DNS

=== S13 ===
The women's 100 metre Butterfly S13 event will be held on 22 September. Eleven swimmers will take part, with the top eight progressing to the final.

The relevant records at the beginning of the event were as follows:

Record	Athlete	Time	City	Country
World	Carlotta Gilli (ITA)	1:02.22	Lignano Sabbiadoro	Italy
Championship	Carlotta Gilli (ITA)	1:02.61	Manchester	United Kingdom
African	Alani Ferreira (RSA)	01:18.2	Funchal	Portugal
Americas	Rebecca Meyers (USA)	01:03.2	Rio de Janeiro	Brazil
Asian	Shokhsanamkhon Toshpulatova (UZB)	01:03.9	London	United Kingdom
European	Carlotta Gilli (ITA)	01:02.2	Lignano Sabbiadoro	Italy
Oceania	Prue Watt (AUS)	01:07.1	Edmonton, Alberta	Canada

==== Heats ====
Rank	Heat	Lane	Athlete	Class	Result	Notes
1	1	4	Grace Nuhfer (USA)	S13	1:04.22	Q
2	2	4	Carlotta Gilli (ITA)	S13	1:04.67	Q
3	1	5	Roisin Ni Riain (IRL)	S13	1:05.55	Q
4	2	3	Olivia Chambers (USA)	S13	1:06.14	Q
5	2	5	Muslima Odilova (UZB)	S13	1:06.47	Q
6	2	6	Marian Polo Lopez (ESP)	S13	1:07.56	Q
7	1	3	Gia Pergolini (USA)	S13	1:08.19	Q
8	1	6	Ariadna Edo Beltran (ESP)	S13	1:08.49	Q
9	2	2	Aleksandra Ziablitseva (AIN)	S13	1:11.89	
10	1	2	Alani Ferreira (RSA)	S13	1:21.20	
11	2	7	Thea Lokebo (NOR)	S13	1:25.07	

==== Final ====
Rank	Lane	Athlete	Class	Result	Notes
1st place, gold medalist(s)	4	Grace Nuhfer (USA)	S13	1:03.33	
2nd place, silver medalist(s)	5	Carlotta Gilli (ITA)	S13	1:04.26	
3rd place, bronze medalist(s)	3	Roisin Ni Rian (IRL)	S13	1:04.47	
4	6	Olivia Chambers (USA)	S13	1:05.60	
5	2	Muslima Odilova (UZB)	S13	1:06.44	
6	7	Marian Polo Lopez (ESP)	S13	1:07.51	
7	8	Ariadna Edo Beltran (ESP)	S13	1:08.23	
8	1	Gia Pergolini (USA)	S13	1:08.28	

=== S14 ===
The women's 100 metre Butterfly S14 event will be held on 27 September. Eleven swimmers will take part, with the top eight in the heats proceeding to the final.

The relevant records at the beginning of the event were as follows:

Record	Athlete	Time	City	Country
World	Poppy Maskill (GBR)	1:02.74	Sheffield	United Kingdom
Championship	Valeriia Shabalina (RUS)	1:03.68	London	United Kingdom
Americas	Angela Marina (CAN)	01:10.1	Toronto	Canada
Asian	Yui Lam Chan (HKG)	01:03.7	Paris	France
European	Poppy Maskill (GBR)	01:02.7	Sheffield	United Kingdom
Oceania	Paige Leonhardt (AUS)	01:05.3	Funchal	Portugal

==== Heats ====
Rank	Heat	Lane	Athlete	Class	Time	Notes
1	1	5	Olivia Newman-Baronius (GBR)	S14	1:04.55	Q
2	1	4	Poppy Maskill (GBR)	S14	1:06.60	Q
3	1	3	Valeriia Shabalina (AIN)	S14	1:06.98	Q
4	1	6	Louise Fiddes (GBR)	S14	1:07.19	Q
5	1	2	Paige Leonhardt (AUS)	S14	1:08.84	Q
6	1	8	Daria Meleshko (AIN)	S14	1:10.23	Q
7	1	7	Nattharinee Khajhonmatha (THA)	S14	1:11.46	Q
8	1	0	Ana Karolina Soares (BRA)	S14	1:12.05	Q
9	1	1	Syuci Indriani (INA)	S14	1:13.83	
10	1	9	Yan Ting Danielle Moi (SGP)	S14	1:14.13	

==== Final ====
Rank	Lane	Athlete	Time	Notes
1st place, gold medalist(s)	5	Poppy Maskill (GBR)	1:02.58	WR
2nd place, silver medalist(s)	4	Olivia Newman-Baronius (GBR)	1:02.75	
3rd place, bronze medalist(s)	3	Valeriia Shabalina (AIN)	1:04.96	
4	6	Louise Fiddes (GBR)	1:06.83	
5	2	Paige Leonhardt (AUS)	1:08.09	
6	1	Nattharinee Khajhonmatha (THA)	1:10.35	
7	7	Daria Meleshko (AIN)	1:11.28	
8	8	Ana Karolina Soares (BRA)	1:12.57	
