= Swimming at the 2026 Commonwealth Games – Women's 200 metre individual medley SM10 =

Women's 200 metre individual medley SM10 at the 2026 Commonwealth Games
- Venue: Tollcross International Swimming Centre
- Dates: 24 July
- Competitors: 9 from 4 nations
- Winning time: 2:29.61

Medalists
gold medal	Faye Rogers (SM10)	Scotland
silver medal	Jasmine Greenwood (SM10)	Australia
bronze medal	Mary Jibb (SM10)	Canada

The women's 200 metre individual medley SM10 event at the 2026 Commonwealth Games was held on 24 July at the Tollcross International Swimming Centre. It was won by Faye Rogers of Scotland.

== Schedule ==
The schedule was as follows:

All times are British Summer Time (UTC+1)

Date	Time	Round
Friday 24 July 2026	12:11	Heats
Friday 24 July 2026	20:41	Final

== Results ==
=== Heats ===
The heats were held at 12:11 on 24 July 2026.

Heat results
Rank	Heat	Lane	Swimmer	Nation	Time	Notes
1	2	4	Faye Rogers (SM10)	Scotland	2:32.00	Q
2	1	4	Katie Cosgriffe (SM10)	Canada	2:33.05	Q
3	1	5	Jasmine Greenwood (SM10)	Australia	2:35.30	Q
4	2	5	Mary Jibb (SM10)	Canada	2:36.20	Q
5	1	3	Toni Shaw (SM9)	Scotland	2:40.67	Q
6	2	6	Brock Whiston (SM9)	England	2:47.98	Q
7	2	2	Tianna Asala (SM10)	Canada	2:49.80	Q
8	1	6	Evie Lambert (SM9)	England	2:51.59	Q
	2	3	Brooklyn Hale (SM9)	England		DSQ

=== Final ===
The final was held at 20:41 on 24 July 2026.

Final results
Rank	Lane	Swimmer	Nation	Time	Notes
1st place, gold medalist(s)	4	Faye Rogers (SM10)	Scotland	2:29.61	
2nd place, silver medalist(s)	3	Jasmine Greenwood (SM10)	Australia	2:32.13	
3rd place, bronze medalist(s)	6	Mary Jibb (SM10)	Canada	2:32.54	
4	5	Katie Cosgriffe (SM10)	Canada	2:32.70	
5	2	Toni Shaw (SM9)	Scotland	2:40.31	
6	1	Tianna Asala (SM10)	Canada	2:43.17	
7	7	Brock Whiston (SM9)	England	2:46.53	
8	8	Evie Lambert (SM9)	England	2:47.46	
