= Agáta Koupilová =

Czech Paralympic swimmer (born 1999)

Personal information
- Born: 2 October 1999 (age 26) Prague, Czech Republic

Sport
- Sport: Para swimming
- Disability class: S5
Medal record
Women's para swimming
Representing the Czech Republic
World Championships
Silver medal – second place	2025 Singapore	50 m freestyle S5
Silver medal – second place	2025 Singapore	100 m freestyle S5
Silver medal – second place	2025 Singapore	200 m freestyle S5
Bronze medal – third place	2023 Manchester	200 m freestyle S5
European Championships
Bronze medal – third place	2024 Funchal	50 m freestyle S5
Bronze medal – third place	2024 Funchal	100 m freestyle S5
Bronze medal – third place	2024 Funchal	200 m freestyle S5
Bronze medal – third place	2026 Kocaeli	50 m freestyle S5

Agáta Koupilová (born 2 October 1999) is a Czech para swimmer. She represented the Czech Republic at the 2024 Summer Paralympics.

== Career ==
Koupilová made her World Para Swimming Championships debut in 2023 and won a bronze medal in the 200 metre freestyle S5 event.

In April 2024, she competed at the 2024 World Para Swimming European Open Championships and won three bronze medals. She then represented the Czech Republic at the 2024 Summer Paralympics.

In September 2025, she competed at the 2025 World Para Swimming Championships and won a silver medal in the 50 metre freestyle S5 event.
