= Ayano Tsujiuchi =

Japanese Paralympic swimmer (born 1996)

Personal information
- Born: 5 October 1996 (age 30) Edogawa, Tokyo, Japan

Sport
- Sport: Swimming
- Classifications: S12
Medal record
Women's Paralympic swimming
Representing Japan
Paralympic Games
Bronze medal – third place	2024 Paris	100 m freestyle S12
World Championships
Silver medal – second place	2022 Madeira	100 m freestyle SB13
Silver medal – second place	2025 Singapore	100 m freestyle S12
Bronze medal – third place	2019 London	100 m breaststroke SB13
Bronze medal – third place	2022 Madeira	50 m freestyle S13
Bronze medal – third place	2022 Madeira	Mixed 4x100m medley relay 49pts
Bronze medal – third place	2025 Singapore	50 m freestyle S12
Bronze medal – third place	2025 Singapore	Mixed 4×100 m medley relay 49pts
Bronze medal – third place	2025 Singapore	Mixed 4×100 m freestyle relay 49pts
Asian Para Games
Gold medal – first place	2026 Aichi–Nagoya	100 m freestyle S13

Ayano Tsujiuchi (辻内 彩野, Tsujiuchi Ayano; born 5 October 1996) is a Japanese Paralympic swimmer. She won the bronze medal in the women's 100 metre freestyle S12 event at the 2024 Summer Paralympics in Paris, France.

== Career ==
Tsujiuchi won a bronze medal at the 2018 Pan Pacific Para Swimming Championships held in Cairns, Australia. She won the bronze medal in the women's 100 metre breaststroke SB13 event at the 2019 World Para Swimming Championships held in London, United Kingdom. In 2021, she competed at the 2020 Summer Paralympics in Tokyo, Japan.
