= Leanne Smith (swimmer) =

American Paralympic swimmer (born 1988)

Personal information
- Born: May 8, 1988 (age 38) Beverly, Massachusetts, U.S.
- Home town: Salem, Massachusetts, U.S.

Sport
- Sport: Para swimming
- Disability: Dystonia
- Disability class: S3, SM3
Medal record
Women's para swimming
Representing the United States
Event	1st	2nd	3rd
Paralympic Games	2	3	0
World Championships	13	3	3
Total	15	6	3
Paralympic Games
Gold medal – first place	2024 Paris	50 m freestyle S4
Gold medal – first place	2024 Paris	100 m freestyle S3
Silver medal – second place	2020 Tokyo	100 m freestyle S3
Silver medal – second place	2024 Paris	Mixed 4×50 m freestyle relay 20pts
Silver medal – second place	2024 Paris	Mixed 4×50 m medley relay 20pts
World Championships
Gold medal – first place	2019 London	50 m breaststroke S3
Gold medal – first place	2019 London	100 m freestyle S3
Gold medal – first place	2019 London	150 m ind. medley SM4
Gold medal – first place	2022 Madeira	50 m breaststroke SB3
Gold medal – first place	2022 Madeira	50 m backstroke S3
Gold medal – first place	2022 Madeira	50 m freestyle S3
Gold medal – first place	2022 Madeira	100 m freestyle S3
Gold medal – first place	2022 Madeira	200 m freestyle S3
Gold medal – first place	2022 Madeira	150 m ind. medley SM4
Gold medal – first place	2022 Madeira	Mixed 4×50 m medley 20pts
Gold medal – first place	2025 Singapore	50 m freestyle S3
Gold medal – first place	2025 Singapore	100 m freestyle S3
Gold medal – first place	2025 Singapore	200 m freestyle S3
Silver medal – second place	2019 London	50 m backstroke S3
Silver medal – second place	2025 Singapore	150 m ind. medley SM3
Silver medal – second place	2025 Singapore	50 m backstroke S3
Bronze medal – third place	2023 Manchester	200 m freestyle S3
Bronze medal – third place	2025 Singapore	Mixed 4×50 m freestyle relay 20pts
Bronze medal – third place	2025 Singapore	Mixed 4×50 m medley relay 20pts

Leanne Smith (born May 8, 1988) is an American para swimmer who represented the United States at the 2020 and 2024 Summer Paralympics. She is a thirteen-time World Champion.

== Career ==
Smith represented the United States in the women's 100 metre freestyle S3 event and won a silver medal at the 2020 Summer Paralympics.

On April 14, 2022, Smith was named to the roster to represent the United States at the 2022 World Para Swimming Championships. At the World Championships, she won a gold medal in all seven events she participated in, to lead all swimmers in gold medals. Her seven gold medals were the most in a single championships by an American since Jessica Long also won seven gold medals in 2010.

Following the 2022 World Para Championships, she fell ill with a respiratory infection. As a result, she spent several weeks in the hospital with a partially collapsed lung, including time in the intensive care unit. During this time she had to relearn how to eat, speak, swallow and swim. After extensive rehab on April 29, 2023, Smith was named to the roster to represent the United States at the 2023 World Para Swimming Championships. During the event she won a bronze medal in the 200 metre freestyle S3 event.

She competed at the 2025 World Para Swimming Championships and tied Katie Kubiak as team USA's most decorated swimmer at the event with seven medals. She won three gold medals, two silver medals and two bronze medals.

== Personal life ==
In 2012 Smith was diagnosed with dystonia, a progressive disease which affects all four of her limbs, her vocal cords and her trunk. She was also diagnosed with lupus.
