= Alexa Leary =

Australian Paralympic swimmer and musician (born 2001)

Alexa Leary OAM
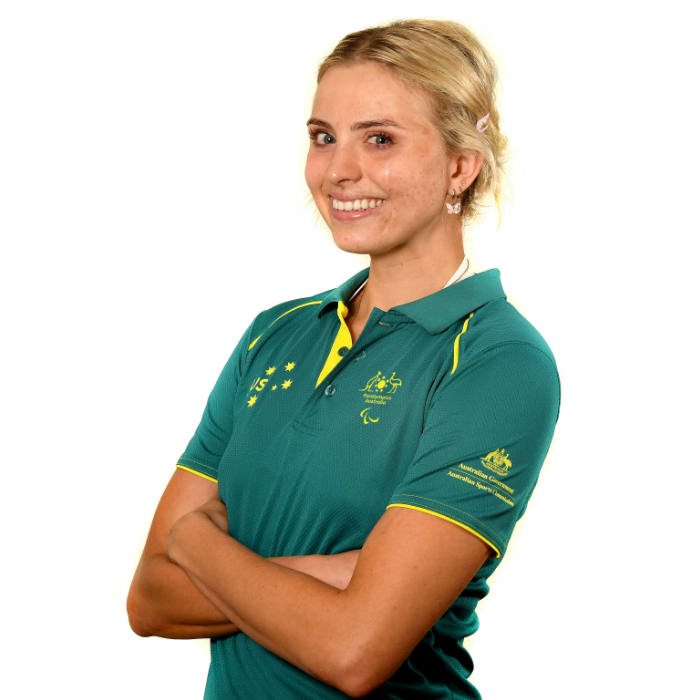

Personal information
- Nationality: Australian
- Born: 18 August 2001 (age 25)
- Occupations: Swimmer; singer-songwriter; musician
Lex Leary
- Genres: Electronic; tech house; pop
- Instruments: Vocals; digital audio workstation
- Years active: 2025–present
- Label: Etcetc

Sport
- Country: Australia
- Sport: Paralympic swimming
- Disability class: S9
- Club: Bond University
- Coached by: Jon Bell
Medal record
Paralympic swimming
Representing Australia
Paralympic Games
Gold medal – first place	2024 Paris	100 m freestyle S9
Gold medal – first place	2024 Paris	Mixed 4×100 m medley relay 34pts
Silver medal – second place	2024 Paris	Mixed 4×100 m freestyle relay 34pts
World Championships
Gold medal – first place	2023 Manchester	100 m freestyle S9
Gold medal – first place	2025 Singapore	100 m freestyle S9
Gold medal – first place	2025 Singapore	Mixed 4×100 m freestyle relay 34 pts
Silver medal – second place	2023 Manchester	50 m freestyle S9
Silver medal – second place	2025 Singapore	50 m freestyle S9

Alexa "Lex" Leary OAM (born 18 August 2001) is an Australian Paralympic swimmer, singer-songwriter, and musician. She won two gold medals and a silver medal at the 2024 Paris Paralympics. She has won multiple gold medals at the World Para Swimming Championships.

== Early life ==
Alexa Leary was born on 18 August 2001 to parents Belinda and Russ Leary. She has four siblings—sisters Madison and Ashtyn, and brothers Max and Jack. She grew up on the Gold Coast and later Yamba and Noosa, where her triathlon coach was based. She attended Good Shepherd Lutheran College.

On 17 July 2021, Leary suffered life-changing brain injuries as a result of a serious cycling accident in Pomona, Queensland. Whilst riding her bike in training for triathlons, her front wheel clipped the bike ahead at 70 km/h. She landed on her head which resulted in major brain damage, blood clots and several broken bones. She spent 111 days in hospital. Whilst in hospital, a fund raising campaign called "Moveforlex" raised over $130,000 for enhanced care at the Royal Brisbane and Women's Hospital Neurosurgery Ward with a focus on equipment and family support.

== Career ==
=== Triathlon career ===
Leary won the silver medal at the Women's Under 18–19 at World Triathlon Grand Final in Lausanne, Switzerland before her training accident.

=== Swimming career ===
Her triathlon training incorporated swimming. After her training accident, she was classified as an S9 swimmer. At the 2023 World Para Swimming Championships, Manchester, she won a gold medal in the Women's 100 m Freestyle S9 just outside the world record and a silver medal in the Women's 50 m Freestyle S9. At the 2024 Paris Paralympics, she won gold medals in Women's 100 m freestyle S9 (world record) and Mixed 4 × 100 m medley 34 pts (Paralympic record). She won a silver in the Mixed 4 × 100 m freestyle 34 pts. She finished sixth in the Women's 50 m freestyle S9. After winning the individual gold medal, Leary said "I've just come so far in life. Being told three years ago I wouldn't live ... but I am. I proved the world wrong." At the 2025 World Para Swimming Championships in Singapore, she won two gold medals—Women's 100m Freestyle S9 and Mixed 4 × 100 m Freestyle 34pts and the silver medal in Women's 100m Freestyle S9.

=== Music career ===
On 24 July 2025, Leary announced that she had signed a recording contract with Australian electronic independent record label Etcetc under the stage name "Lex Leary", simultaneously releasing her debut single "Closer", a tech house and pop song featuring Sydney pop musician Xira, which she co-produced alongside fellow Gold Coast producer and musician Wongo.

== Discography ==
=== Singles ===
List of singles, with title, year, and album details shown
Title	Year	Album
"Closer" (featuring Xira)	2025	Non-album single

== Awards and recognition ==
- 2023 – Swimming Australia 2023 Awards: Australian Institute of Sport (AIS) Discovery of the Year
- 2023 – Australian Institute of Sport Performance Awards: Emerging Athlete of the Year
- 2024 – Queensland Sports Awards: Para-athlete of the Year
- 2024 – Australian Paralympic Rookie of the Year
- 2025 – Medal of the Order of Australia (OAM) for service to sport as a gold medallist at the Paris Paralympic Games 2024.
