= Greenwood Community High School =

Location
- 615 W. Smith Valley Road; Greenwood, Indiana 46142; United States; 39°36′10.47″N 86°7′2.65″W

Information
- Type: Public high school
- Established: 1954
- School district: Greenwood Community School Corporation
- Principal: Michael T. Gasaway
- Teaching staff: 71.00 (FTE)
- Grades: 9-12
- Enrollment: 1,219 (2023–2024)
- Student to teacher ratio: 17.17
- Color
- Athletics: IHSAA AAAA
- Athletics conference: Mid-State Conference
- Mascot: Woodman
- Team name: Woodmen
- Website: Official Website

Greenwood Community High School is a public high school located in Greenwood, Indiana. It is located in a southern suburb of Indianapolis, Indiana.

== About ==
It is composed of more than 1100 students and operates on a seven period day with 45 minutes of instruction in each period.

== Athletics ==
The Woodmen are members of the Mid-State Conference. The Woodmen were a founding member of the Mid-State Conference in 1942, and have been a member ever since. However, Greenwood will switch to the Hoosier Legends Conference in the 2026–2027 season. The following IHSAA sponsored sports are available:

- Fall
  - Girls Soccer
  - Boys Soccer
  - Boys Tennis
  - Co-Ed Cross Country
  - Football
  - Girls Golf
  - Girls Volleyball
- Winter
  - Boys Basketball
  - Girls Basketball
  - Boys Wrestling
  - Girls Wrestling
  - Co-Ed Swimming and Diving
- Spring
  - Baseball
  - Softball
  - Boys Volleyball
  - Girls Tennis
  - Boys Golf
  - Co-Ed Track and Field

=== Championships ===
Sport	Conference Champions	County Champions	Sectional Champions	Other
Girls Soccer				
Boys Soccer				
Boys Tennis	1985, 1986, 1987, 1988, 1989, 1990, 2001, 2003, 2005, 2017			
Cross Country		Boys - 1992, 1993		
Football	1959, 1960, 1965, 1986, 1987, 1990, 1992, 2003, 2005, 2012		2017	
Girls Golf	2001, 2002, 2003, 2004		2000	State Finalist - 2012
Girls Volleyball				
Boys Basketball	1943, 1944, 1963, 1965, 1970, 1971, 1982, 1986, 1994, 2001, 2006, 2018	2001	1991, 2002	Indiana Mr. Basketball - John Bass (1941)
Girls Basketball	2012, 2013	2008, 2013		
Boys Wrestling			1986, 1987, 1988	
Girls Wrestling				
Swimming and Diving			Girls - 1986	
Track and Field	Boys - 1972, 1979, 1985, 1987, 1988, 1989, 2004 Girls - 1984, 2014			
Baseball	1942, 1975. 2001, 2003	2009, 2012	1972, 1975, 1976, 1977, 1978, 1982, 1983, 1984	
Softball	2003, 2005, 2011, 2012	2013	1988	
Boys Volleyball				
Girls Tennis	1986, 1987, 2004, 2010, 2013, 2016	2000, 2001, 2002, 2012	1998, 2003	
Boys Golf	1997, 2012		1986, 2006	

== Band ==
=== Marching Band ===
Greenwood Community High School is known for their marching band which goes by the name "Greenwood Marching Woodmen and Irish Guard". They have participated in State Finals 46 times, the most out of any band in Indiana. They have won 14 ISSMA State Championships (1986, 1987, 1989, 1990, 1995, 1996, 1997, 2000, 2006, 2007, 2010, 2013, 2014, and 2018) and won the state fair competition in 1976. The band most recently got 4th at the 2025 ISSMA state finals and were state runner-ups in 2023 and 2024. The Marching Woodman have also marched in the 1993 Philadelphia Thanksgiving Day Parade, the 1997 Fiesta Bowl Parade, and the 2001, 2005, 2009, 2013, and 2017 Hollywood Christmas Parades. The also were the 2018 BOA Indianapolis Super-Regional Class AA Champion.

=== Indoor Percussion ===
Founded in 2000, Greenwood Community High School has had an indoor percussion group. They compete in the Indiana Percussion Association (IPA), and have appeared at 24 State Finals. They have been state champions twice (2004, 2008) and scholastic concert world champions in 2008.

=== Concert Ensembles ===
There are two concert ensembles, with the upper Wind Ensemble and the lower Symphonic Band. Both ensembles have participated in ISSMA Concert Band Competitions since 1981. The Symphonic Band has achieved 20 Superior ratings and 15 Gold ratings, and the Wind Ensemble has received 22 Superior ratings and 15 Gold ratings. The Wind Ensemble also placed in the top 15 at state four times (1989, 1991, 1996, 1999).

== Robotics ==
Founded during the 2014-2015 season, Greenwood has a successful FTC robotics program that currently encompasses three teams. The oldest team, 8791 Green Machine, is made up of entirely by high school students at Greenwood and has qualified for state during 8 of its 12 seasons (2015, 2016, 2017, 2018, 2020, 2021, 2023, 2025). Green Machine's sister team, 8793 Wired Woodmen, was also founded during the 2014–2015 season, though it was renamed from Green Machine Jr in 2017. This team is composed entirely of middle school students from Greenwood Middle School, and has qualified for state twice (2021, 2022). Due to a rapid expansion in membership and a new head mentor during the 2025–2026 season, Green Machine split off some of its members to form another FTC team, 32356 Golden Gizmos.

== Notable alumni ==
- A. J. Edds (2006) – Former NFL linebacker
- Andy Chanley – Voice over artist and actor
- Brayton Laster – Racing Driver
- Griffin Oakes – former college football placekicker for the Indiana Hoosiers
- Grace Nuhfer – American para swimmer who completed in the 2024 Olympics
- Colonel Sanders – KFC founder, lived in Greenwood during his school years and dropped out of the seventh grade

== See also ==
- List of high schools in Indiana
