= Grace Nuhfer =

American para swimmer (born 2002)

Personal information
- Nationality: American
- Born: July 15, 2002 (age 24) Greenwood, Indiana, U.S.

Sport
- Sport: Para swimming
- Disability: Brittle cornea syndrome
- Disability class: S13
Medal record
Women's para swimming
Representing United States
Paralympics Games
Silver medal – second place	2024 Paris	100 m butterfly S13
World Championships
Gold medal – first place	2025 Singapore	100 m butterfly S13
Bronze medal – third place	2025 Singapore	100 m freestyle S13
Bronze medal – third place	2025 Singapore	400 m freestyle S13
Parapan American Games
Silver medal – second place	2023 Santiago	50 m freestyle S13

Grace Nuhfer (born July 15, 2002) is an American para swimmer who represented the United States at the 2024 Summer Paralympics.

== Early life and education ==
Nuhfer attended Greenwood Community High School where she was a three-time state qualifier and won multiple Johnson County, Mid-State Conference and sectional championships in the 100-yard butterfly. In January 2021 she verbally committed to swim at the University of Akron. While at Akron she's pursuing a business/data analytics major and philosophy/pre-law minor degree.

== Career ==
Nuhfer was scheduled to make her para swimming debut in May 2023, however, she underwent surgery in March to repair torn ligaments in her left wrist. She made her debut at the 2023 California Classic in September, where she won all six of her events and set an S13 American record in the 200-meter butterfly with a time of 2:30.38. As a result, she qualified to represent the United States at the 2023 Parapan American Games. During the Parapan American Games she won a silver medal in the 50 meter freestyle S13 event with a Parapan American Games record time of 27.90.

On June 30, 2024, Nuhfer was named to team USA's roster to compete at the 2024 Summer Paralympics. She won a silver medal in the 100 metre butterfly S13 event. She made her World Para Swimming Championships in 2025 and won a gold medal in the 100 metre butterfly S13 event with a time of 1:03.33. This was team USA's first medal of the World Championships.

== Personal life ==
Nuhfer was born to Adam and Tami Nuhfer, and has one sister, Elaina. Her mother ran track and field for four years at Purdue University. Nuhfer and her sister both have brittle cornea syndrome, a rare genetic disorder.
