= 2019 World Para Swimming Championships – Women's 50 metre breaststroke =

The women's 50m breaststroke events at the 2019 World Para Swimming Championships were held in the London Aquatics Centre at the Queen Elizabeth Olympic Park in London between 9–15 September.

== Medalists ==
Event	Gold	Silver	Bronze
SB3	Leanne Smith; United States	Maryna Verbova; Ukraine	Patricia Valle; Mexico
