= Delia Fontcuberta Cervera =

Spanish para swimmer

Personal information
- Nationality: Spanish

Sport
- Sport: Para swimming
- Disability class: S3
Medal record
Women's para swimming
Representing Spain
World Championships
Silver medal – second place	2025 Singapore	200 m freestyle S3
Bronze medal – third place	2025 Singapore	50 m freestyle S3
European Championships
Gold medal – first place	2026 Kocaeli	50 m freestyle S3
Gold medal – first place	2026 Kocaeli	100 m freestyle S3
Bronze medal – third place	2024 Funchal	50 m freestyle S4

Delia Fontcuberta Cervera is a Spanish para swimmer.

== Career ==
Fontcuberta competed at the 2024 World Para Swimming European Open Championships and won a bronze medal in the 50 metre freestyle S4 event. She competed at the 2025 World Para Swimming Championships and won a bronze medal in the 50 metre freestyle S3 event.
