= Chloe Osborn =

Australian Paralympic swimmer

Personal information
- Nationality: Australian
- Born: 15 October 2003 (age 23)

Sport
- Country: Australia
- Sport: Paralympic swimming
- Disability class: S7
- Club: ACU Blacktown
- Coached by: Misha Payne
Medal record
Women's para-swimming
Representing Australia
Paralympic Games
Silver medal – second place	2024 Paris	Mixed 4×100 m freestyle relay 34pts
World Championships
Gold medal – first place	2025 Singapore	Mixed 4×100 m freestyle relay 34 pts
Silver medal – second place	2025 Singapore	100 m freestyle S7
Silver medal – second place	2025 Singapore	400 m freestyle S7
Bronze medal – third place	2025 Singapore	Mixed 4×100 m medley relay 34pts

Chloe Osborn (born 15 October 2003) is an Australian para swimmer. She competed at the 2024 Summer Paralympicswinning a silver medal. At the 2025 World Para Swimming Championships in Singapore, she won four medals - one gold, two silver and one bronze.

== Personal life ==
At the age of twelve, Osborn was diagnosed Ewing sarcoma, a rare and aggressive cancer. She suffered nerve damage and spinal injury as a result of surgery to remove the tumour. Her physiotherapist recommended taking up swimming as part of her rehabilitation. She attended Beaumont Hills Public School and Kellyville High School.

== Swimming ==
Prior to her cancer diagnosis, Osborn was obsessed with soccer. As part of her rehabilitation, she swam once or twice each week at the Hawkesbury Oasis. She them moved to squad swimming training four times per week. She was classified as a S7 swimmer. Her first swimming competition was at the age of fifteen. She moved to ACU Blacktown to be coached by Misha Payne.

After strong performances at national swimming championships, she was selected as a member of The Para Flippers Development Squad for 2023. She was selected on the Australian Swim Para Team to compete at Para Swimming European Open Championships in Madeira, Portugal in 2024.

At the 2024 Paris Paralympics, she competed in the 100 m freestyle S7 (7th), Women's 400 m freestyle S7 (4th) and Mixed 4 x 50 m freestyle 20 points (team disqualified). She was a member of the Mixed 4 × 100 m freestyle relay 34pts that won the silver medal.

At the 2025 World Para Swimming Championships in Singapore, she won the gold medal in Mixed 4 x 100 m Freestyle 34pts, silver medals in 100 m and 400 m Freestyle S7 and the bronze medal in the Mixed 4 x 100 m Medley Relay 34pts.

In 2024, she is a New South Wales Institute of Sport scholarship athlete.
