= Defne Kurt =

Turkish para swimmer (born 2001)

Personal information
- Born: 4 May 2001 (age 25) Istanbul, Turkey
- Education: Yeditepe University

Sport
- Sport: Para swimming
- Disability class: S10
Medal record
Representing Turkey
World Championships
| Gold medal – first place | 2025 Singapore | 50 m freestyle S10 |
| Gold medal – first place | 2025 Singapore | 100 m freestyle S10 |
| Gold medal – first place | 2025 Singapore | 200 m ind. medley SM10 |
| Gold medal – first place | 2025 Singapore | 100 m butterfly S10 |
| Gold medal – first place | 2025 Singapore | 100 m backstroke S10 |
European Championships
| Gold medal – first place | 2026 Kocaeli | 50 m freestyle S10 |
| Gold medal – first place | 2026 Kocaeli | 100 m freestyle S10 |
| Gold medal – first place | 2026 Kocaeli | 200 m ind. medley SM10 |
European Youth Olympic Festival
| Bronze medal – third place | 2015 Tbilisi | 4×100m freestyle relay |

Defne Kurt (born 4 May 2001) is a Turkish para swimmer who competes in international swimming competitions in the S10 classification. She won five gold medals at the 2025 World Para Swimming Championships.

== Career ==
In December 2014, Kurt represented Turkey at the FINA World Swimming Championships (25 m) held in Doha, Qatar. She competed in four events but did not advance to the final in any of them.

At the 2025 World Para Swimming Championships held in Singapore, Kurt won her first gold medal in 50 m freestyle, which was also her first medal in the championships. She then won four more gold medals in the 200 m individual medley, 50m butterfly, 100 m freestyle and 100 m backstroke S10.
