= Arianna Hunsicker =

Canadian Paralympic swimmer (born 2003)

Personal information
- Born: 8 August 2003 (age 22) Surrey, British Columbia, Canada

Sport
- Country: Canada
- Sport: Paralympic swimming
- Disability class: S10, SM10
- Club: Surrey Knights Swim Club
Medal record
Paralympic swimming
Representing Canada
World Championships
Bronze medal – third place	2025 Singapore	50m freestyle S10
Parapan American Games
Bronze medal – third place	2019 Lima	50m freestyle S10
Bronze medal – third place	2019 Lima	100m backstroke S10
Bronze medal – third place	2019 Lima	400m freestyle S10
Bronze medal – third place	2019 Lima	200m individual medley SM10
Bronze medal – third place	2019 Lima	4x100m medley relay

Arianna Hunsicker (born 8 August 2003) is a Canadian Paralympic swimmer who competes in the S10 class.

== Early life and education ==
Hunsicker was born with a partial left hand. She first took swimming lessons at age eight and started competitive swimming in 2017. Hunsicker attended Tweedsmuir Secondary School in Surrey. She is pursuing a Bachelor of Commerce at Concordia University.

== Career ==
Hunsicker trained with the Surrey Knights Swim Club. At age 12, she won six gold medals and one silver at the 2016 BC Summer Games.

She won five bronze medals at the 2019 Parapan American Games, her Parapan American Games debut. The medals were in the women's 4 × 100 m medley relay (with Michelle Tovizi, Colleen Cloetta, and Krystal Shaw), 50m freestyle, 400m freestyle, 100m backstroke, and 200m individual medley.

Hunsicker was named Swim BC’s Female Provincial Para Swimmer of the Year in 2020. She will make her Paralympic debut at the Paris 2024 games.
