= Katie Kubiak =

American paralympic swimmer

Personal information
- Born: May 14, 2003 (age 23)
- Home town: Cedarburg, Wisconsin, U.S.

Sport
- Sport: Para swimming
- Disability: Congenital myopathy
- Disability class: S4
Medal record
Women's para swimming
Representing the United States
World Championships
| Gold medal – first place | 2025 Singapore | 100 m freestyle S4 |
| Gold medal – first place | 2025 Singapore | 50 m backstroke S4 |
| Gold medal – first place | 2025 Singapore | 50 m freestyle S4 |
| Gold medal – first place | 2025 Singapore | 200 m freestyle S4 |
| Silver medal – second place | 2025 Singapore | 50 m butterfly S5 |
| Bronze medal – third place | 2025 Singapore | Mixed 4×50 m freestyle relay 20pts |
| Bronze medal – third place | 2025 Singapore | Mixed 4×50 m medley relay 20pts |

Katie Kubiak (born May 14, 2003) is an American para swimmer.

== Career ==
In June 2025, Kubiak competed at the U.S. Paralympics Swimming National Championships, where she set four World Records. She set records in the 50-meter butterfly (39.66), 100-meter backstroke (1:32.72), 50-meter freestyle (36.44), and 200-meter freestyle (2:44.97) events.

She made her World Para Swimming Championships debut in 2025. She tied Leanne Smith as team USA's most decorated swimmer at the event with seven medals. She won four gold medals, one silver medal and two bronze medals. She set world records in the 50 metre backstroke S4 with a time of 42.66, 50 metre freestyle S4 with a time of 36.83.

== Personal life ==
Kubiak was diagnosed with late-onset congenital myopathy. She underwent spinal surgery in 2018. She attends the New York University Tisch School of the Arts where she is double majoring in journalism and film.
