= 2019 World Para Swimming Championships – Women's 150 metre individual medley =

The women's 150m individual medley events at the 2019 World Para Swimming Championships were held in the London Aquatics Centre at the Queen Elizabeth Olympic Park in London between 9–15 September.

== Medalists ==
Event	Gold	Silver	Bronze
SM4	Leanne Smith; United States	Maryna Verbova; Ukraine	Arjola Trimi; Italy
