= Faye Rogers =

British Paralympic swimmer (born 2002)

Personal information
- Born: 21 September 2002 (age 23) Stockton-on-Tees, England

Sport
- Sport: Paralympic swimming
- Club: University of Aberdeen
- Coached by: Patrick Miley
Medal record
Representing Great Britain
Paralympic Games
| Gold medal – first place | 2024 Paris | 100 m butterfly S10 |
World Championships
| Gold medal – first place | 2023 Manchester | 100 m butterfly S10 |
| Gold medal – first place | 2025 Singapore | 400 m freestyle S10 |
| Silver medal – second place | 2025 Singapore | 200 m ind. medley SM10 |
| Silver medal – second place | 2025 Singapore | 100 m butterfly S10 |
| Silver medal – second place | 2025 Singapore | 100 m freestyle S10 |
| Silver medal – second place | 2025 Singapore | Mixed 4×100 m medley relay 34pts |
| Bronze medal – third place | 2023 Manchester | 400m freestyle S10 |
| Bronze medal – third place | 2023 Manchester | 200m ind. medley SM10 |

Faye Rogers (born 21 September 2002) is a British Paralympic swimmer who competes in international swimming competitions. She is a two-time World champion and won a gold medal at the 2024 Summer Paralympics.

== Career ==
Rogers was an able-bodied swimmer who had competed at the 2021 Olympic Selection trials but was involved in a car accident which resulted in limited movement in her elbow.

At the 2025 World Para Swimming Championships in Singapore, Rogers won the gold medal in the Women's S10 400 metres freestyle with a time of 4:32.34, setting a new British record and a personal best. She also achieved a personal best in the 200 metres individual medley event at the same championships.

== Personal life ==
Rogers is of Scottish descent through her father.
