= Mary Jibb =

Canadian para swimmer (born 2006)

Personal information
- Born: October 26, 2006 (age 19) Bracebridge, Ontario, Canada

Sport
- Sport: Para swimming
- Disability class: S9, SM9
- Club: Muskoka Aquatic Club (2014–2024); Pacific Sea Wolves Swim Club (2024–pres.)
Medal record
Representing Canada
World Championships
Gold medal – first place	2025 Singapore	200 m ind. medley SM9
Bronze medal – third place	2025 Singapore	100 m freestyle S9
Bronze medal – third place	2025 Singapore	100 m backstroke S9
Commonwealth Games
Bronze medal – third place	2026 Glascow	200m individual medley SM10

Mary Jibb (born October 26, 2006) is a Canadian para swimmer who competes in international swimming competitions. Competing in the S9 classification, she has most notably competed in the Summer Paralympics and the World Para Swimming Championships.

== Early life ==
Jibb was born on October 26, 2006, in Bracebridge, Ontario. In 2012, at age five, she experienced a left basal ganglia stroke that left her physically impaired. Around 2014, she began swimming with the Muskoka Aquatic Club. In March 2024, Jibb moved to Surrey, British Columbia to train with the Pacific Sea Wolves Swim Club under coach Jy Lawrence.

== Career ==
In April 2024, Jibb competed in the Para Swimming World Series event in Indianapolis, where she won the 50 m freestyle, 100 m backstroke and 200 m individual medley events. She had also won the bronze medal in the 100 m breaststroke. In June 2024, Jibb was selected to represent Canada at the 2024 Summer Paralympics held in Paris, France. Her best result was in the 100 m backstroke where she finished in fifth place.

At the 2025 World Para Swimming Championships held in Singapore, Jibb won the gold medal 200 m individual medley, where she also set a new Americas and Canadian record. She also won the bronze medal in the 100 m backstroke and freestyle, setting another Canadian record in the former. She won Canada's first medal at the 2026 Commonwealth Games, winning bronze in the 200 m individual medley SM10 with a time of 2:32.54.
