= Patrícia Pereira =

Brazilian Paralympic swimmer

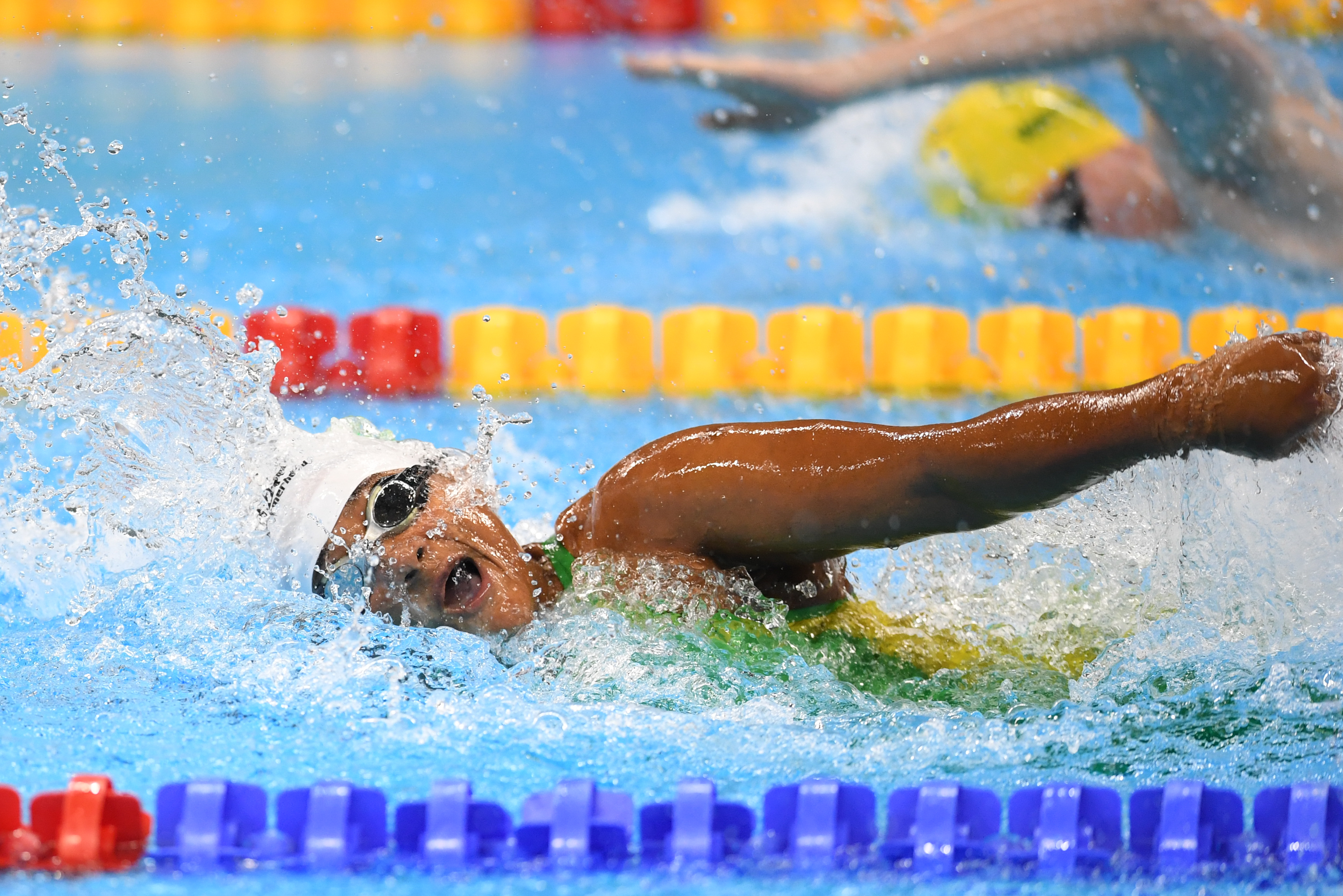
- Pereira at the 2016 Summer Paralympics

Personal information
- Full name: Patrícia Pereira dos Santos
- Born: 11 December 1977 (age 48) Coronel Fabriciano, Minas Gerais

Sport
- Country: Brazil
- Sport: Paralympic swimming
- Disability class: S4
- Club: AA Ferroviária
Medal record
Paralympic swimming
Representing Brazil
Paralympic Games
Silver medal – second place	2024 Paris	50 m breaststroke SB3
Bronze medal – third place	2020 Tokyo	Mixed 4×50 m free relay 20pts
Bronze medal – third place	2024 Paris	Mixed 4×50 m freestyle relay 20 pts
World Championships
Silver medal – second place	2023 Manchester	50 m freestyle S4
Bronze medal – third place	2022 Madeira	50 m breaststroke SB3
Bronze medal – third place	2022 Madeira	200 m freestyle S4
Bronze medal – third place	2023 Manchester	150 m ind. medley SM4
Bronze medal – third place	2025 Singapore	50 m breaststroke SB3
Bronze medal – third place	2025 Singapore	50 m freestyle S4

Patrícia Pereira dos Santos (born 11 December 1977) is a Brazilian Paralympic swimmer who competes in international events.

== Career ==
She represented Brazil at the 2020 Summer Paralympics and won a bronze medal in the Mixed 4 × 50 metre freestyle relay 20pts.

== Personal life ==
In 2002, she was shot in the neck during a robbery at her workplace. Her injuries resulted in quadriplegia.

She is part of the LGBTQ+ community.
