= Katie Cosgriffe =

Canadian para swimmer

Personal information
- National team: Canada
- Born: January 9, 2006 (age 20) Toronto, Ontario, Canada
- Height: 172 cm (5 ft 8 in)

Sport
- Sport: Para swimming
- Classifications: S10
- Club: Oakville Aquatic Club
- Coach: Dave Tontini
Medal record
Women's para swimming
Representing Canada
Paralympic Games
| Bronze medal – third place | 2024 Paris | 100 m butterfly S10 |
World Championships
| Silver medal – second place | 2025 Singapore | 100 m backstroke S10 |
| Bronze medal – third place | 2025 Singapore | 100 m butterfly S10 |

Katie Cosgriffe (born January 9, 2006) is a Canadian para swimmer who made her Paralympic debut at the 2024 Summer Paralympics in Paris, France. She competes in the S10 classification, which is for athletes with physical impairments.

== Early life and education ==
Cosgriffe was born in 2006 in Toronto, Ontario, and grew up in Burlington, Ontario. She began swimming at a young age and was initially an able-bodied competitor. However, in 2021, she was diagnosed with a neurological disorder that affects her nervous system called Charcot-Marie-Tooth Disease, leading to her classification as a Para swimmer.

== Swimming career ==
Cosgriffe continued to train and compete after her diagnosis, and was para-swimming classified in April 2023. In 2023, she was named Canada's breakout Para swimmer, a recognition of her rapid rise in the sport. She trains with the Oakville Aquatic Club and is coached by some of Canada's top swimming coaches. Her events include the 100m butterfly and 100m backstroke in the S10 classification.

At the 2022 Canada Summer Games, Cosgriffe won seven medals in para-swimming, including six gold. She competed for Team Canada at the 2023 World Para Swimming Championships and was the youngest member of the team. She reached reached three event finals, including a fourth-place finish in the S10 100-m butterfly and fifth in the 100 backstroke.

She broke the Canadian Record in the S10 100-m butterfly at the 2023 Canadian Swimming Trials with a time of 1:08.68, and then again at the 2024 Canadian Paralympic Trials with a time of 1:06.75. Cosgriffe is set to compete in four events at the 2024 Summer Paralympics in Paris, representing Canada. She won bronze in the women's S10 100-metre butterfly. At the 2025 World Para Swimming Championships, she won bronze in the women’s 100-metre butterfly S10 and silver in the women’s 100-metre backstroke S10, with a new personal best of 1:07.37.

== Personal life ==
Cosgriffe recently graduated from high school and has dedicated herself to full-time training ahead of the 2024 Paralympics. She plans to study business administration and financial math at Wilfrid Laurier University in Waterloo, Ontario.
