= Astrid Carroll =

Scottish para swimmer

Personal information
- Nationality: Scottish
- Born: 2009 Edinburgh

Sport
- Sport: Para swimming
- Disability: Stargardt disease
- Disability class: S13, SB13
- Club: Stockport Metro
Medal record
Women's para swimming
Representing Great Britain
World Championships
Silver medal – second place	2025 Singapore	100 m breaststroke SB12
Bronze medal – third place	2025 Singapore	100 m backstroke S12

Astrid Carroll (born 2009) is a Scottish para swimmer. Born in Edinburgh, she has represented Great Britiain at the World Para Swimming Championships and Scotland at the Commonwealth Games.

== Personal life ==
Carroll was born in Edinburgh, Scotland before moving to Holmfirth in 2012.

Her sister Ursula Carroll also has Stargardt disease, and represented Team England at the 2026 Commonwealth Games. She also has a brother named Otto.

== Career ==
On 6 August 2025, Astrid Carroll was selected to compete at the 2025 World Para Swimming Championships. She made her World Para Swimming Championships debut in Singapore in September and won a silver medal in the 100m breaststroke SB12 event and a bronze medal in the 100 metre backstroke S12 event. In April 2026, she was selected by Team Scotland for the 2026 Commonwealth Games.
