= Zoia Shchurova =

Russian Paralympic swimmer (born 2000)

Personal information
- Nationality: Russian
- Born: 19 November 2000 (age 25) Moscow, Russia

Sport
- Sport: Paralympic swimming
- Disability class: S3, SB3
Medal record
Women's para swimming
Representing Neutral Paralympic Athletes
Paralympic Games
Silver medal – second place	2024 Paris	50 m backstroke S3
European Championships
Silver medal – second place	2024 Funchal	50 m backstroke S3
Silver medal – second place	2026 Kocaeli	50 m backstroke S3
Bronze medal – third place	2024 Funchal	50 m freestyle S3
Bronze medal – third place	2024 Funchal	100 m freestyle S3

Zoia Shchurova (born 19 November 2000) is a Russian Paralympic swimmer.

== Career ==
Shchurova represented Neutral Paralympic Athletes at the 2024 Summer Paralympics and won a silver medal in the 50 metre backstroke S3 event.
