= Anastasiia Goncharova =

Russian para swimmer

Personal information
- Nationality: Russian

Sport
- Sport: Para swimming
- Disability class: S4, SM4, SB3
Medal record
Women's para swimming
Representing Neutral Paralympic Athletes
World Championships
Silver medal – second place	2025 Singapore	50 m backstroke S4
Representing Russia
European Championships
Bronze medal – third place	2026 Kocaeli	50 m backstroke S4

Anastasiia Goncharova is a Russian para swimmer.

== Career ==
In June 2025, Goncharova competed at the 2025 Para Swimming World Series in Guadalajara, and won gold medals in the 50 metre backstroke, 50 metre breaststroke, and 150 metre individual medley, to finish as the most decorated female athlete during the event. In September 2025, she competed at the 2025 World Para Swimming Championships and won a silver medal in the 50 metre backstroke S4 event.
