= Jordan Tucker =

American basketball player (born 1998)

No. 3 – Promitheas Patras
- Position: Small forward
- League: Greek Basket League

Personal information
- Born: April 3, 1998 (age 28) White Plains, New York, U.S.
- Listed height: 6 ft 7 in (2.01 m)
- Listed weight: 210 lb (95 kg)

Career information
- High school: White Plains (White Plains, New York); Archbishop Stepinac (White Plains, New York); Wheeler (Marietta, Georgia)
- College: Duke (2017–2018); Butler (2018–2020)
- NBA draft: 2020: undrafted
- Playing career: 2021–present

Career history
- 2021–2022: Windy City Bulls
- 2022: Rio Grande Valley Vipers
- 2022: Sioux Falls Skyforce
- 2022–2023: KK Feniks 2010
- 2023: BC Chernomorets
- 2023–2024: Chorale Roanne Basket
- 2024: Delaware Blue Coats
- 2025: Westchester Knicks
- 2025: Neptūnas Klaipėda
- 2025–2026: Élan Chalon
- 2026–present: Promitheas Patras
- Stats at NBA.com
- Stats at Basketball Reference

Jordan Lewis Tucker (born April 3, 1998) is an American-born Maltese professional basketball player for Promitheas Patras of the Greek Basket League. He played college basketball for the Duke Blue Devils and the Butler Bulldogs. He also represents the senior Maltese national team in international competition.

== Early life and high school career ==
Tucker began his high school career at White Plains High School. On December 28, 2013, he scored 34 points in a 74–48 win against Cardinal Spellman High School. Tucker transferred to Archbishop Stepinac High School for his sophomore season and averaged 15.6 points per game. He averaged 17.8 points, 9.8 rebounds, and 2.8 assists per game as a junior, earning Second Team All-League honors. For his senior season, Tucker transferred to Wheeler High School in Georgia, reuniting with his friend Darius Perry. A four-star recruit, he committed to playing college basketball for Duke in May 2017 over offers from Syracuse, Georgia Tech, Oregon, Villanova and Indiana.

== College career ==
Tucker found minimal playing time at Duke, scoring six points in two games. He opted to transfer to Butler after the first semester, choosing the Bulldogs over Georgetown. Tucker became eligible for Butler in December 2018. On January 19, 2019, he scored a career-high 24 points in an 80–71 win against St. John's. He averaged 9.7 points and 4.1 rebounds per game as a sophomore. Tucker focused on improving his shooting during his junior season. As a junior, Tucker averaged 8.9 points and 3.8 rebounds per game, shooting 36 percent from three-point range. Following the season, he declared for the 2020 NBA draft.

== Professional career ==
=== Windy City Bulls (2021–2022) ===
In October 2021, Tucker joined the Windy City Bulls after a successful tryout. Tucker was then later waived on January 17, 2022. In nine games, he averaged 3.9 points and 3.0 rebounds per game.

=== Rio Grande Valley Vipers (2022) ===
On January 25, 2022, Tucker was added to the roster of the Rio Grande Valley Vipers. He was waived on January 31.

=== Sioux Falls Skyforce (2022) ===
On March 24, 2022, Tucker was acquired via available player pool by the Sioux Falls Skyforce.

=== KK Feniks 2010 (2022–2023) ===
On November 26, 2022, Tucker signed with KK Feniks 2010 of the Macedonian First League. In five games, he averaged 16.4 points, 5.4 rebounds, and one assist per game.

=== BC Chernomorets (2023) ===
On January 15, 2023, Tucker joined BC Chernomorets of the Bulgarian National Basketball League.

=== Chorale Roanne Basket (2023–2024) ===
On September 11, 2023, Tucker signed with Chorale Roanne Basket of the LNB Pro A.

=== Delaware Blue Coats (2024) ===
On September 30, 2024, Tucker signed with the Philadelphia 76ers, but was waived on October 17. On October 28, he joined the Delaware Blue Coats, but was waived on January 11, 2025.

=== Neptūnas Klaipėda (2025) ===
On July 11, 2025, Tucker signed one–year contract with Neptūnas Klaipėda of the Lithuanian Basketball League (LKL) and the EuroCup.

== Career statistics ==
Legend
GP	Games played	GS	Games started	MPG	Minutes per game
FG%	Field goal percentage	3P%	3-point field goal percentage	FT%	Free throw percentage
RPG	Rebounds per game	APG	Assists per game	SPG	Steals per game
BPG	Blocks per game	PPG	Points per game	**Bold**	Career high

=== College ===
Year	Team	GP	GS	MPG	FG%	3P%	FT%	RPG	APG	SPG	BPG	PPG
2017–18	Duke	2	0	7.0	**.500**	**.500**	.500	.5	.0	.0	.0	3.0
2018–19	Butler	24	**9**	22.2	.358	.370	**.826**	**4.1**	**.8**	**.5**	.1	**9.7**
2019–20	Butler	**30**	5	**22.7**	.357	.357	.791	3.8	.7	.3	**.2**	8.9
Career		56	14	21.9	.359	.364	.800	3.8	.7	.3	.1	9.0

== Personal life ==
Tucker is the son of Lewis Tucker and Lori Land. Lewis Tucker played basketball at Tuskegee University and earned his degree in finance. The elder Tucker served as president of recording artist P. Diddy’s Sean Combs Enterprises before becoming a sports agent representing Ben Gordon and C. J. Miles. Tucker's godfather is the late rapper Heavy D.
