= Husnah Kukundakwe =

Ugandan Paralympic swimmer

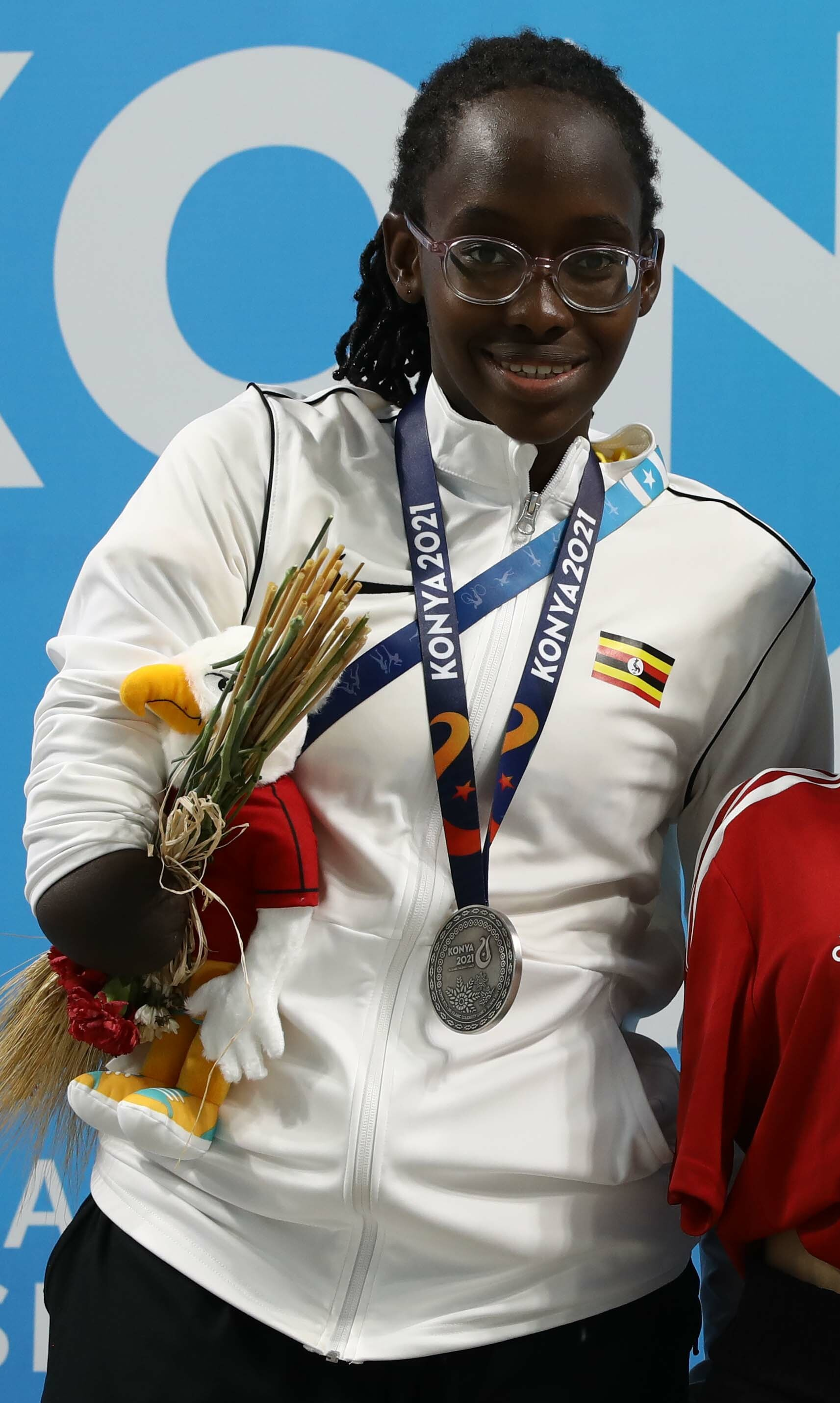

Personal information
- Full name: Husnah Kukundakwe Biramahiire
- Nationality: Uganda
- Born: 25 March 2007 (age 19) Lubaga Hospital, Kampala, Uganda

Sport
- Sport: Swimming
- Strokes: Breaststroke
- Classifications: SB8, S8, SM8
- Club: Gators Swim Club
- Coach: Muzafaru Muwanguzi(national)
Medal record
Women's paralympic swimming
Representing Uganda

Husnah Kukundakwe (born 25 March 2007) is an Ugandan swimmer. She is the only classified paralympic swimmer of her homeland. Her first appearance at the World Championships in London was mentioned among the International Paralympic Committee's (IPC's) Top 10 Moments of 2019.

== Background and education ==
Kukundakwe was born in 2007 in Lubaga Hospital, Kampala to Hashima Batamuriza and Ahmed Asiimwe. She has a congenital limb impairment that left her with no right lower arm. She attended Lyna Daycare and Nursery School and as of 2019, was residing in Kampala and was a pupil at Sir Apollo Kaggwa Primary School in Mengo, a Kampala suburb. A student of Aga Khan High School for O'level from 2021 - 2024 passed with A Grades. Student of Kabojja International School Kampala for A'level with BCM combination to pursue Medicine at University

== Participation in swimming ==
Kukundakwe began swimming at the age of five and is a member of Gators Swim Club Kampala. Locally she participated in the 2017 DSTV swimming gala challenge in 2017 at Greenhill Academy, Kampala. She also participated in the 2018 Korea Paralympic Youth Camp where she won gold in the 100m breaststroke.

As of May 2019, Kukundakwe was competing in the S9 (freestyle, butterfly and backstroke), SB8 (breaststroke) and SM9 (Individual Medley) which were reviewed at the World Para Swimming World Series 2019 in Singapore. She recorded three personal best times in the 100m breaststroke (1:57.8), 100m freestyle (1:30.43) and 50m freestyle (40.24).

From this event, she qualified and was Uganda's sole representative at the London 2019 World Para Swimming Allianz Championships. At this event she improved her times in the 50m (38.14) and 100m (1:24.85) freestyle events. In 2021 she represented Uganda at the 2020 Paralympic Games in Tokyo Japan and recorded her personal best (PB) in the 100m Breaststroke. Was the youngest athlete at the Tokyo Games. First Ugandan to participate and presented during the MPC (Main Press Conference) before the start of Games in Tokyo.

In 2022 she represented Uganda at the Lignano Sabbiadoro World Series and earned Uganda its first International Para Swimming medals in the 100m butterfly and 100m breaststroke.

She also represented Uganda at the Commonwealth Games in Birmingham from 28 July to 8 August 2022 as its sole Para Swimmer.

In 2022 she participated in the Konya 2021 Islamic Solidarity Games in Turkey and won six medals- two gold, three silver and a bronze in Para Swimming events.

In 2023 she competed at her second Para Swimming Championships in Manchester. Championships Finalist in 100m Breaststroke and qualified for Paris 2024 Paralympic Games with 4 events. 100m Breaststroke, 100m Butterfly, 100m Freestyle and 50m Freestyle.

She was a Torch Bearer at Paris 2024 Games alongside the Director General UNESCO.

== See also ==
- 2019 World Para Swimming Championships
- Prossy Tusabe
- Tofiri Kibuuka
- Olivia Aya Nakitanda
- Jamila Lunkuse
- Ganzi Mugula
