= Brenda Anellia Larry =

Malaysian paralympic swimmer (born 2005)

Personal information
- Nationality: Malaysian
- Born: 23 August 2005 (age 19); Sabah
- Height: 157 cm (5 ft 2 in)

Sport
- Sport: Paralympic swimming
- Disability class: S4

Brenda Anellia Larry is a Malaysian Paralympic swimming athlete. She has competed in the 2020 Summer Paralympics in swimming events. Although she did not make it to the finals, she set an Asian record in the S5 women's 50m butterfly.
