= 2025 World Para Swimming Championships =

13th World Para Swimming Championship held in Singapore

- Host city: Singapore
- Date: 21–27 September
- Venue: Singapore Sports Hub
- Nations: 70
- Athletes: 600

The 2025 World Para Swimming Championships, known as the Toyota World Para Swimming Championships for sponsorship reasons were the 13th edition of the World Para Swimming Championships, an international swimming competition and world championships for swimmers with disabilities. It was held in Singapore from 21 to 27 September 2025. This was the first time that an Asian country has hosted the World Para Swimming Championships.

The event was organised by the Singapore Disability Sports Council (SDSC) and took place at the 50m x 10 lane competition pool at the OCBC Aquatic Centre within the Singapore Sports Hub. The venue is home to Singapore Swimming Association and was the host venue for the aquatics discipline at the 28th Southeast Asian Games in 2015.

Toyota Asia was the headline sponsor of the Championships for the first time.

== Participating nations ==
1. Argentina (7)
2. Australia (38)
3. Austria (4)
4. Brazil (29)
5. Canada (19)
6. Germany (10)
7. Great Britain (22)
8. Hungary (6)
9. Ireland (5)
10. Azerbaijan (1)
11. Belgium (3)
12. Bosnia and Herzegovina (2)
13. Chile ()
14. China ()
15. Colombia ()
16. Croatia ()
17. Czech Republic ()
18. Cyprus ()
19. Denmark (1)
20. Egypt (2)
21. El Salvador (1)
22. Spain ()
23. Estonia (2)
24. Finland (1)
25. France ()
26. Georgia (1)
27. Germany ()
28. Greece ()
29. Hong Kong (1)
30. Hungary (1)
31. Indonesia (1)
32. India (3)
33. Iran (3)
34. Ireland (2)
35. Iraq (1)
36. Iceland ()
37. Israel ()
38. Italy ()
39. Japan ()
40. Kazakhstan (4)
41. South Korea (2)
42. Saudi Arabia (2)
43. Laos (1)
44. Latvia (1)
45. Libya (1)
46. Lithuania ()
47. Malaysia (2)
48. Moldova (2)
49. Mexico ()
50. Netherlands (4)
51. Norway (2)
52. NPA ()
53. New Zealand ()
54. Panama (1)
55. Peru ()
56. Philippines ()
57. Poland ()
58. Portugal ()
59. Qatar (1)
60. Romania (1)
61. South Africa ()
62. Singapore ()
63. Sri Lanka (1)
64. Switzerland (1)
65. Sweden (1)
66. Thailand ()
67. Turkey ()
68. Ukraine ()
69. United States ()
70. Uzbekistan (4)

== Schedule ==
- indicates direct finals with no morning heat, Green boxes are mixed events, pink boxes women's events and lilac boxes, men's events.

Day 1	Day 2	Day 3	Day 4	Day 5	Day 6	Day 7
21 September	22 September	23 September	24 September	25 September	26 September	27 September
M 400m Free S8	M 100m Free S4	M 100m Back S1 *	M 100m Back S13	Mx . 4×100m Free S14 *	W 100m Brst. SB8	M 100m Brst. SB8
W 400m Free S8	W 100m Free S4	M 100m Brst. SB7	W 100m Back S13 *	W 100m Brst. SB5 *	M 400m Free S13	W 100m Back S10
M 100m Brst. SB9	M 50m Back S5	W 100m Brst. SB7 *	M 200m I.M. SM11	M 100m Brst. SB5 *	W 200m I.M. SM8	M 100m Back S10
W 100m Brst. SB9 *	W 50m Back S5	M 100m Brst. SB14	W 200m I.M. SM11 *	W 400m Free S9	M 200m I.M. SM8	W 400m Free S11 *
M 50m Brst. SB2	M 150m I.M. SM3	W 100m Brst. SB14	M 100m Free S8	M 400m Free S9	W 50m Back S2	M 400m Free S11
W 50m Brst. SB2	W 150m I.M. SM3	M 100m Back S2 *	W 100m Free S8	W 100m Fly S10	M 50m Back S2	W 100m Free S7
M 50m Free S5	M 400m Free S7	W 100m Back S2	M 400m Free S6	M 100m Fly S10	M 50m Back S1 *	M 100m Free S7
W 50m Free S5	W 400m Free S7	M 150m I.M. SM4	W 400m Free S6 *	W 50m Free S4	W 50m Free S7	W 50m Fly S6 *
M 100m Fly S13	M 100m Free S6	W 150m I.M. SM4	M 100m Brst. SB12	M 50m Free S4	M 50m Free S7	M 50m Fly S6
W 100m Fly S13	W 100m Free S6 *	M 50m Free S12	W 100m Brst. SB12 *	W 50m Free S8	W 100m Back S11	W 50m Free S9
M 100m Back S6	M 200m I.M. SM10	W 50m Free S12	M 200m Free S1	M 50m Free S8	M 100m Back S11	M 50m Free S9
W 100m Back S6 *	W 200m I.M. SM10 *	M 50m Fly S5	M 50m Back S3	W 50m Fly S7	W 200m Free S5 *	W 100m Free S5
M 200m Free S14	M 100m Back S8	W 50m Fly S5	W 50m Back S3	M 50m Fly S7	M 200m Free S5	M 100m Free S5
W 200m Free S14	W 100m Back S8	M 200m I.M. SM6	M 50m Back S4	W 100m Free S12	W 200m Free S3 *	W 200m Free S4
M 200m I.M. SM7	M 100m Fly S11	W 200m I.M. SM6 *	W 50m Back S4	M 100m Free S12	M 200m Free S3	M 200m Free S4 *
W 200m I.M. SM7	M 100m Fly S12	M 100m Fly S9	M 200m Free S2 *	W 50m Free S6 *	W 100m Back S9	W 200m I.M. SM13
M 50m Free S11	W 100m Fly S12 *	W 100m Fly S9	W 200m Free S2 *	M 50m Free S6	M 100m Back S9	M 200m I.M. SM13
W 50m Free S11	M 100m Back S14	M 400m Free S10	M 200m I.M. SM5	W 200m I.M. SM14	W 100m Free S10	W 100m Free S3
M 50m Brst. SB3	W 100m Back S14	W 400m Free S10 *	W 200m I.M. SM5	M 200m I.M. SM14	M 100m Free S10	M 100m Free S3
W 50m Brst. SB3	M 100m Brst. SB13	M 100m Brst. SB11	M 100m Back S7	W 50m Free S3	W 100m Brst. SB6 *	W 100m Fly S14
M 100m Back S12	W 100m Brst. SB13	W 100m Brst. SB11 *	W 100m Back S7	M 50m Free S3	M 100m Brst. SB6	M 100m Fly S14
W 100m Back S12 *	M 200m I.M. SM9	M 100m Free S13	M 100m Free S9	W 100m Free S11 *	Mx . 4×100m Med. S14 *	Mx . 4×100m Free 34pts *
M 100m Brst. SB4	W 200m I.M. SM9	W 100m Free S13	W 100m Free S9	M 100m Free S11	Mx . 4×100m Free 49pts *	
W 100m Brst. SB4 *	Mx . 4×50m Free 20pts *	M 100m Fly S8	Mx . 4×100m Med. 49pts *	W 50m Free S13	W 100m Brst. SB8	
M 50m Free S10		W 100m Fly S8		M 50m Free S13		
W 50m Free S10		Mx . 4×50m Med. 20pts		Mx . 4×100m Med. 34pts		
* Indicates direct final :free – freestyle ; fly – butterfly ; brst. – breaststroke ; back – backstroke ; I.M. individual medley ; Med – Medley relay M – Men's ; W – Women's : Mx. – mixed : S/SB/SM – classification

* indicates direct finals with no morning heat, Green boxes are mixed events, pink boxes women's events and lilac boxes, men's events.

== Medal table ==
* Host nation (Singapore)

2025 World Para Swimming Championships medal table
Rank	Nation	Gold	Silver	Bronze	Total
–	Neutral Paralympic Athletes (NPA)	22	22	20	64
1	Italy (ITA)	18	17	11	46
2	United States (USA)	18	6	11	35
3	China (CHN)	17	9	6	32
4	Ukraine (UKR)	16	16	17	49
5	Great Britain (GBR)	15	14	11	40
6	Brazil (BRA)	13	16	10	39
7	Australia (AUS)	9	9	8	26
8	Spain (ESP)	6	12	6	24
9	Netherlands (NED)	5	4	5	14
10	Germany (GER)	5	2	3	10
11	Israel (ISR)	5	2	1	8
12	Turkey (TUR)	5	1	4	10
13	Czech Republic (CZE)	4	4	3	11
14	France (FRA)	3	5	7	15
15	Colombia (COL)	3	5	4	12
16	Canada (CAN)	2	3	7	12
17	Japan (JPN)	1	3	5	9
18	Mexico (MEX)	1	1	5	7
19	Azerbaijan (AZE)	1	1	2	4
20	Argentina (ARG)	1	1	0	2
20	Singapore (SGP)*	1	1	0	2
22	Uzbekistan (UZB)	1	0	1	2
23	Ireland (IRL)	0	4	3	7
24	New Zealand (NZL)	0	3	0	3
25	Hungary (HUN)	0	2	3	5
26	Croatia (CRO)	0	2	1	3
26	Switzerland (SUI)	0	2	1	3
28	Cyprus (CYP)	0	2	0	2
29	Poland (POL)	0	1	3	4
30	South Africa (RSA)	0	1	2	3
31	Bosnia and Herzegovina (BIH)	0	1	0	1
31	Kazakhstan (KAZ)	0	1	0	1
33	Finland (FIN)	0	0	3	3
34	Greece (GRE)	0	0	2	2
34	Thailand (THA)	0	0	2	2
36	Chile (CHI)	0	0	1	1
36	Denmark (DEN)	0	0	1	1
36	Norway (NOR)	0	0	1	1
36	Portugal (POR)	0	0	1	1
Totals (39 entries)		172	173	171	516

- Totals of medals for neutral athletes are indicated above for information purposes, but are not included in the official medal table. Italy were recognised as the leading nation in the medal table although Russian and Belarusian swimmers, entered as 'neutral athetes', won more gold medals in aggregate.

== Multi-medalists ==
The following were the ten most successful swimmers at the meet, ordered by gold medals won, then silver, then bronze.

Rank	Athlete	Nation	Events	Medals	Total
1	Daria Lukianenko	Neutral Athlete	Women's 50m Freestyle S11	1st place, gold medalist(s)	6
1	Daria Lukianenko	Neutral Athlete	Women's 200m Individual Medley SM11	1st place, gold medalist(s)	6
1	Daria Lukianenko	Neutral Athlete	Women's 100m Breaststroke SB11	1st place, gold medalist(s)	6
1	Daria Lukianenko	Neutral Athlete	Women's 100m Backstroke S11	1st place, gold medalist(s)	6
1	Daria Lukianenko	Neutral Athlete	Women's 400m Freestyle S11	1st place, gold medalist(s)	6
1	Daria Lukianenko	Neutral Athlete	Women's 100m Freestyle S11	2nd place, silver medalist(s)	6
2	Defne Kurt	Turkey	Women's 50m Freestyle S10	1st place, gold medalist(s)	5
2	Defne Kurt	Turkey	Women's 200m Individual Medley SM10	1st place, gold medalist(s)	5
2	Defne Kurt	Turkey	Women's 100m Butterfly S10	1st place, gold medalist(s)	5
2	Defne Kurt	Turkey	Women's 100m Freestyle S10	1st place, gold medalist(s)	5
2	Defne Kurt	Turkey	Women's 100m Backstroke S10	1st place, gold medalist(s)	5
2	Poppy Maskill	Great Britain	Women's 200m Freestyle S14	1st place, gold medalist(s)	5
2	Poppy Maskill	Great Britain	Women's 100m Backstroke S14	1st place, gold medalist(s)	5
2	Poppy Maskill	Great Britain	Mixed 4x100m Freestyle Relay S14	1st place, gold medalist(s)	5
2	Poppy Maskill	Great Britain	Mixed 4x100m Medley Relay S14	1st place, gold medalist(s)	5
2	Poppy Maskill	Great Britain	Women's 100m Butterfly S14	1st place, gold medalist(s)	5
4	Jiang Yuyan	China	Women's 100m Backstroke S6	1st place, gold medalist(s)	6
4	Jiang Yuyan	China	Women's 100m Freestyle S6	1st place, gold medalist(s)	6
4	Jiang Yuyan	China	Women's 400m Freestyle S6	1st place, gold medalist(s)	6
4	Jiang Yuyan	China	Women's 50m Butterfly S6	1st place, gold medalist(s)	6
4	Jiang Yuyan	China	Women's 50m Freestyle S6	2nd place, silver medalist(s)	6
4	Jiang Yuyan	China	Mixed 4x100m Freestyle Relay 34pts	2nd place, silver medalist(s)	6
5	David Kratochvil	Czech Republic	Men's 50m Freestyle S11	1st place, gold medalist(s)	7
5	David Kratochvil	Czech Republic	Men's 100m Butterfly S11	1st place, gold medalist(s)	7
5	David Kratochvil	Czech Republic	Men's 100m Freestyle S11	1st place, gold medalist(s)	7
5	David Kratochvil	Czech Republic	Men's 400m Freestyle S11	1st place, gold medalist(s)	7
5	David Kratochvil	Czech Republic	Men's 100m Backstroke S11	2nd place, silver medalist(s)	7
5	David Kratochvil	Czech Republic	Men's 100m Breaststroke SB11	3rd place, bronze medalist(s)	7
5	David Kratochvil	Czech Republic	Men's 200m Individual Medley SM11	3rd place, bronze medalist(s)	7
5	Katie Kubiak	United States	Women's 100m Freestyle S4	1st place, gold medalist(s)	7
5	Katie Kubiak	United States	Women's 50m Backstroke S4	1st place, gold medalist(s)	7
5	Katie Kubiak	United States	Women's 50m Freestyle S4	1st place, gold medalist(s)	7
5	Katie Kubiak	United States	Women's 200m Freestyle S4	1st place, gold medalist(s)	7
5	Katie Kubiak	United States	Women's 50m Butterfly S5	2nd place, silver medalist(s)	7
5	Katie Kubiak	United States	Mixed 4x50m Freestyle Relay 20pts	3rd place, bronze medalist(s)	7
5	Katie Kubiak	United States	Mixed 4x50m Medley Relay 20pts	3rd place, bronze medalist(s)	7
7	Monica Boggioni	Italy	Women's 50m Freestyle S5	1st place, gold medalist(s)	5
7	Monica Boggioni	Italy	Women's 50m Breaststroke SB3	1st place, gold medalist(s)	5
7	Monica Boggioni	Italy	Women's 200m Freestyle S5	1st place, gold medalist(s)	5
7	Monica Boggioni	Italy	Women's 100m Freestyle S5	1st place, gold medalist(s)	5
7	Monica Boggioni	Italy	Women's 200m Individual Medley SM5	2nd place, silver medalist(s)	5
7	Ami Omer Dadaon	Israel	Men's 50m Breaststroke SB3	1st place, gold medalist(s)	5
7	Ami Omer Dadaon	Israel	Men's 100m Freestyle S4	1st place, gold medalist(s)	5
7	Ami Omer Dadaon	Israel	Men's 50m Freestyle S4	1st place, gold medalist(s)	5
7	Ami Omer Dadaon	Israel	Men's 200m Freestyle S4	1st place, gold medalist(s)	5
7	Ami Omer Dadaon	Israel	Men's 150m Individual Medley SM4	2nd place, silver medalist(s)	5
7	Carol Santiago	Brazil	Women's 100m Backstroke S12	1st place, gold medalist(s)	5
7	Carol Santiago	Brazil	Women's 50m Freestyle S12	1st place, gold medalist(s)	5
7	Carol Santiago	Brazil	Mixed 4x100m Medley Relay 49pts	1st place, gold medalist(s)	5
7	Carol Santiago	Brazil	Women's 100m Freestyle S12	1st place, gold medalist(s)	5
7	Carol Santiago	Brazil	Mixed 4x100m Freestyle Relay 49pts	2nd place, silver medalist(s)	5
7	Alice Tai	Great Britain	Women's 400m Freestyle S8	1st place, gold medalist(s)	5
7	Alice Tai	Great Britain	Women's 100m Backstroke S8	1st place, gold medalist(s)	5
7	Alice Tai	Great Britain	Women's 100m Butterfly S8	1st place, gold medalist(s)	5
7	Alice Tai	Great Britain	Women's 100m Freestyle S8	1st place, gold medalist(s)	5
7	Alice Tai	Great Britain	Mixed 4x100m Medley Relay 34pts	2nd place, silver medalist(s)	5

== See also ==
- 2025 World Aquatics Championships, also held in Singapore.
