= Netherlands at the 2020 Summer Paralympics =

- Flag of the Netherlands
- IPC code: NED
- NPC: NOC*NSF
- Website: paralympisch.nl

in Tokyo
- Competitors: 72 in 12 sports
- Flag bearers: Fleur Jong and Jetze Plat
- Medals Ranked 5th: Gold 25 Silver 17 Bronze 17 Total 59

Summer Paralympics appearances (overview)
- 1960; 1964; 1968; 1972; 1976; 1980; 1984; 1988; 1992; 1996; 2000; 2004; 2008; 2012; 2016; 2020; 2024

Netherlands competed at the 2020 Summer Paralympics in Tokyo, Japan, from 24 August to 5 September 2021. This was their sixteenth consecutive appearance at the Summer Paralympics since 1960.

== Medalists ==
Medal	Name	Sport	Event	Date
Gold	Tristan Bangma; Guide: Patrick Bos	Cycling	Men's individual pursuit B	25 August
Gold	Larissa Klaassen; Guide: Imke Brommer	Cycling	Women's time trial B	26 August
Gold	Rogier Dorsman	Swimming	Men's 400 metre freestyle S11	26 August
Gold	Chantalle Zijderveld	Swimming	Women's 100 metre breaststroke SB9	26 August
Gold	Sanne Voets	Equestrian	Individual test grade IV	26 August
Gold	Fleur Jong	Athletics	Women's long jump T64	28 August
Gold	Jetze Plat	Paratriathlon	Men's PTWC	29 August
Gold	Kelly van Zon	Table tennis	Women's individual class 7	30 August
Gold	Sanne Voets	Equestrian	Individual freestyle test grade IV	30 August
Gold	Rogier Dorsman	Swimming	Men's 200 metre individual medley SM11	30 August
Gold	Mitch Valize	Cycling	Men's road time trial H5	31 August
Gold	Jetze Plat	Cycling	Men's road time trial H4	31 August
Gold	Daniel Abraham Gebru	Cycling	Men's road time trial C5	31 August
Gold	Marlene van Gansewinkel	Athletics	Women's 200 metres T64	31 August
Gold	Mitch Valize	Cycling	Men's road race H5	1 September
Gold	Jennette Jansen	Cycling	Women's road race H1–4	1 September
Gold	Jetze Plat	Cycling	Men's road race H4	1 September
Gold	Rogier Dorsman	Swimming	Men's 100 metre breaststroke SB11	1 September
Gold	Sam Schröder; Niels Vink	Wheelchair tennis	Quad doubles	1 September
Gold	Vincent ter Schure; Guide: Timo Fransen	Cycling	Men's road race B	3 September
Gold	Chantalle Zijderveld	Swimming	Women's 200 metre individual medley SM10	3 September
Gold	Marlene van Gansewinkel	Athletics	Women's 100 metres T64	3 September
Gold	Diede de Groot	Wheelchair tennis	Woman's singles	3 September
Gold	Diede de Groot; Aniek van Koot	Wheelchair tennis	Women's doubles	4 September
Gold	Women's wheelchair basketball team: Anouk Taggenbrock; Ilse Arts; Sylvana van Hees; Lindsay Frelink; Jitske Visser; Julia van der Sprong; Bo Kramer; Xena Wimmenhoeve; Cher Korver; Saskia Pronk; Carina de Rooij; Mariska Beijer	Wheelchair basketball	Women's tournament	4 September
Silver	Chantalle Zijderveld	Swimming	Women's 50 metre freestyle S10	25 August
Silver	Liesette Bruinsma	Swimming	Women's 400 metre freestyle S11	26 August
Silver	Lisa Kruger	Swimming	Women's 100 metre breaststroke SB9	26 August
Silver	Alyda Norbruis	Cycling	Women's time trial C1–3	27 August
Silver	Chantalle Zijderveld	Swimming	Women's 100 metre freestyle S10	28 August
Silver	Annika van der Meer; Corné de Koning	Rowing	Mixed double sculls	29 August
Silver	Rixt van der Horst; Frank Hosmar; Sanne Voets	Equestrian	Team	29 August
Silver	Frank Hosmar	Equestrian	Individual freestyle test grade V	30 August
Silver	Vincent ter Schure	Cycling	Men's time trial B	31 August
Silver	Bas Takken	Swimming	Men's 400 metre freestyle S10	1 September
Silver	Frederique van Hoof; Kelly van Zon	Table tennis	Women's team class 6–8	2 September
Silver	Tristan Bangma; Guide: Patrick Bos	Cycling	Men's road race B	3 September
Silver	Liesette Bruinsma	Swimming	Women's 100 metre freestyle S11	3 September
Silver	Olivier Hendriks	Athletics	Men's 400 metres T62	3 September
Silver	Noëlle Roorda	Athletics	Women's javelin throw F46	3 September
Silver	Sam Schroder	Wheelchair tennis	Quad singles	4 September
Silver	Tom Egberink	Wheelchair tennis	Men's singles	4 September
Bronze	Frank Hosmar	Equestrian	Individual test grade V	26 August
Bronze	Caroline Groot	Cycling	Women's time trial C4–5	27 August
Bronze	Rixt van der Horst	Equestrian	Individual test grade III	27 August
Bronze	Marlene van Gansewinkel	Athletics	Women's long jump T64	28 August
Bronze	Lisa Kruger	Swimming	Women's 100 metre freestyle S10	28 August
Bronze	Thomas van Wanrooij	Swimming	Men's 200 metre individual medley SM13	30 August
Bronze	Jennette Jansen	Cycling	Women's road time trial H4–5	31 August
Bronze	Chantalle Zijderveld	Swimming	Women's 100 metre butterfly S10	31 August
Bronze	Kimberly Alkemade	Athletics	Women's 200 metres T64	31 August
Bronze	Tim de Vries	Cycling	Men's road race H5	1 September
Bronze	Lisa Kruger	Swimming	Women's 100 metre backstroke S10	2 September
Bronze	Niels Vink	Wheelchair tennis	Quad singles	3 September
Bronze	Daniel Abraham Gebru	Cycling	Men's road race C4–5	3 September
Bronze	Tom Egberink; Maikel Scheffers	Wheelchair tennis	Men's doubles	3 September
Bronze	Bas Takken	Swimming	Men's 200 metre individual medley SM10	3 September
Bronze	Lisa Kruger	Swimming	Women's 200 metre individual medley SM10	3 September
Bronze	Nikita den Boer	Athletics	Women's marathon T54	5 September

Medals by sport
Sport	1st place, gold medalist(s)	2nd place, silver medalist(s)	3rd place, bronze medalist(s)	Total
Cycling	9	3	4	16
Swimming	5	6	6	17
Wheelchair tennis	3	2	2	7
Athletics	3	2	3	8
Equestrian	2	2	2	6
Table tennis	1	1	0	2
Paratriathlon	1	0	0	1
Wheelchair basketball	1	0	0	1
Rowing	0	1	0	1
Total	25	17	17	59

== Competitors ==
Sport	Men	Women	Total
Athletics	6	11	17
Badminton	0	1	1
Boccia	1	0	1
Cycling	6	5	11
Equestrian	1	3	4
Rowing	1	1	2
Swimming	7	3	10
Table Tennis	0	2	2
Triathlon	2	1	3
Wheelchair Basketball	0	12	12
Wheelchair Tennis	6	2	8
Total	30	41	71

== Officials ==
Retired Dutch wheelchair tennis player Esther Vergeer is Chef de Mission of the Dutch delegation for the 2020 Summer Paralympics.

== Athletics ==
Seventeen athletes have qualified to compete at the 2020 Summer Paralympics.

Key

- Note–Ranks given for track events are within the athlete's heat only
- Q = Qualified for the next round
- q = Qualified for the next round as a fastest loser or, in field events, by position without achieving the qualifying target
- N/A = Round not applicable for the event
- Bye = Athlete not required to compete in round

Track & road events
Men

Athlete	Event	Heats		Final	
Athlete	Event	Result	Rank	Result	Rank
Joël de Jong	100m T63	13.00	4 q	12.90	8
Olivier Hendriks	100m T64	11.29	5	did not advance	
Olivier Hendriks	400m T62	—N/a		47.95	2nd place, silver medalist(s)
Kenny van Weeghel	100m T54	14.17	4 q	14.53	8
Kenny van Weeghel	400m T54	46.81	3	did not advance	
Kenny van Weeghel	800m T54	1:40.87	5	did not advance	
Levi Vloet	200m T64	22.66	4 q	23.10	7

Women

Athlete	Event	Heats		Final	
Athlete	Event	Result	Rank	Result	Rank
Kimberly Alkemade	100m T64	13.06	1 Q	13.12	5
Kimberly Alkemade	200m T64	26.65	2 Q	26.80	3rd place, bronze medalist(s)
Cheyenne Bouthoorn	100m T36	14.84	4 q	14.90	5
Cheyenne Bouthoorn	200m T36	31.62	4 q	31.30	5
Nikita den Boer	1500m T54	3:28.87	4 q	3:29.11	7
Nikita den Boer	5000m T54	—N/a		11:15.37	4
Nikita den Boer	Marathon T54	—N/a		1:38:16	3rd place, bronze medalist(s)
Fleur Jong	100m T64	13.34	4 q	13.10	4
Fleur Schouten	100m T63	16.82	6	did not advance	
Amy Siemons	100m T34	—N/a		20.29	8
Nienke Timmer	100m T35	15.68	5 q	15.49	7
Nienke Timmer	200m T35	—N/a		32.87	6
Marlene van Gansewinkel	100m T64	12.82 PR	1 Q	12.78 PR	1st place, gold medalist(s)
Marlene van Gansewinkel	200m T64	26.56	1 Q	26.22 PR	1st place, gold medalist(s)

Field events
Men

Athlete	Event	Final	
Athlete	Event	Result	Rank
Joël de Jong	Long jump T63	6.41	6
Ranki Oberoi	Long jump T20	6.76	7
Take Zonneveld	Shot put F40	10.04	7

Women

Athlete	Event	Final	
Athlete	Event	Result	Rank
Lara Baars	Shot put F40	7.64	7
Fleur Jong	Long jump T64	6.16	1st place, gold medalist(s)
Noëlle Roorda	Javelin throw F46	40.06	2nd place, silver medalist(s)
Salima Rozema	Long jump T20	4.69	10
Fleur Schouten	Long jump T63	3.97	7
Marlene van Gansewinkel	Long jump T64	5.78	3rd place, bronze medalist(s)

== Badminton ==
Megan Hollander has qualified to compete.

Athlete	Event	Group stage				Quarterfinal	Semifinal	Final / BM	
Athlete	Event	Opposition Score	Opposition Score	Opposition Score	Rank	Opposition Score	Opposition Score	Opposition Score	Rank
Megan Hollander	Women's singles SU5	Monteiro (POR); L (12–21, 19–21)	Asiimwe (UGA); W (21–6, 21–7)	Yang (CHN); L (8–21, 9–21)	3	did not advance			

== Boccia ==
Athlete	Event	Group stage					Quarterfinal	Semifinal	Final / BM	
Athlete	Event	Opposition Score	Opposition Score	Opposition Score	Opposition Score	Rank	Opposition Score	Opposition Score	Opposition Score	Rank
Daniel Perez	Individual BC1	Moreas (BRA); W 13-1	Dolgova (RUS); W 6-5	Tipmanee (THA); W 11-0	Gutnik (RUS); L 4-7	2 Q	de Oliveira (BRA); L 2-6	did not advance		

== Cycling ==
Jennette Jansen, Chantal Haenen, Caroline Groot, Larissa Klaassen, Imke Brommer, Alyda Norbruis, Jetze Plat, Mitch Valize, Tim de Vries, Daniel Abraham, Vincent ter Schure, Timo Fransen, Tristan Bangma and Patrick Bos have all qualified to compete.

=== Road ===
Men

Athlete	Event	Result	Rank
Vincent ter Schure; Pilot: Timo Fransen	Road time trial B	42:00.77	2nd place, silver medalist(s)
Tristan Bangma; Pilot: Patrick Bos	Road time trial B	47:20.91	6
Jetze Plat	Road time trial H4	37:28.92	1st place, gold medalist(s)
Mitch Valize	Road time trial H5	38:12.94	1st place, gold medalist(s)
Tim de Vries	Road time trial H5	41:33.46	5
Daniel Abraham	Road time trial C5	42:46.45	1st place, gold medalist(s)
Vincent ter Schure; Pilot: Timo Fransen	Road race B	2:59:13	1st place, gold medalist(s)
Tristan Bangma; Pilot: Patrick Bos	Road race B	3:05:01	2nd place, silver medalist(s)
Jetze Plat	Road race H4	2:15:13	1st place, gold medalist(s)
Mitch Valize	Road race H5	2:24:30	1st place, gold medalist(s)
Tim de Vries	Road race H5	2:24:40	3rd place, bronze medalist(s)
Daniel Abraham	Road race C4-5	2:15:20	3rd place, bronze medalist(s)

Women

Athlete	Event	Result	Rank
Chantal Haenen	Road race H5	2:47:25	5
Chantal Haenen	Road time trial H4-5	49:15.28	4
Jennette Jansen	Road time trial H4-5	48:45.69	3rd place, bronze medalist(s)
Jennette Jansen	Road race H1–4	56:15	1st place, gold medalist(s)

=== Track ===
Men

Athlete	Event	Heats		Final	
Athlete	Event	Result	Rank	Result	Rank
Tristan Bangma; Pilot: Patrick Bos	Individual pursuit B	3:59.470	1 Q, WR	Bate (Pilot: Duggleby) (GBR); W	1st place, gold medalist(s)
Vincent ter Schure; Pilot: Timo Fransen	Individual pursuit B	4:06.004	5	did not advance	
Daniel Abraham Gebru	Individual pursuit C5	4:23.096	5	did not advance	

Women

Athlete	Event	Heats		Final	
Athlete	Event	Result	Rank	Result	Rank
Alyda Norbruis	Individual pursuit C1-3	4:13.727	12	did not advance	
Alyda Norbruis	Time trial C1-3	—N/a		36.057	2nd place, silver medalist(s)
Larissa Klaassen; Pilot: Imke Brommer	Individual pursuit B	3:32.620	7	did not advance	
Larissa Klaassen; Pilot: Imke Brommer	Time trial B	—N/a		1:05.291	1st place, gold medalist(s)
Caroline Groot	Individual pursuit C4-5	4:18.095	8	did not advance	
Caroline Groot	Time trial C4-5	—N/a		35.599	3rd place, bronze medalist(s)

== Equestrian ==
The Netherlands qualified for the 2020 Summer Paralympics after reaching 2nd place in the 2018 FEI World Equestrian Games. Equestrian riders included are Rixt van der Horst, Frank Hosmar, Maud de Reu and Sanne Voets.

Athlete	Horse	Event	Result	Rank
Rixt van der Horst	Findsley	Individual test grade III	75.765	(bronze) Q
Rixt van der Horst	Findsley	Individual freestyle test grade III	did not start	
Frank Hosmar	Alphaville	Individual test grade V	73.405	(bronze) Q
Frank Hosmar	Alphaville	Individual freestyle test grade V	80.240	2nd place, silver medalist(s)
Maud de Reu	Webron	Individual test grade III	69.941	10
Sanne Voets	Demantur	Individual test grade IV	76.585	(gold) Q
Sanne Voets	Demantur	Individual freestyle test grade IV	82.085	1st place, gold medalist(s)
Rixt van der Horst (GIII); Frank Hosmar (GV); Sanne Voets (GIV)	See above	Team test	229.249	2nd place, silver medalist(s)

Qualification Legend: Q= Qualified for freestyle test

== Paratriathlon ==
Jetze Plat, Geert Schipper and Margret IJdema have all qualified to compete.

Athlete	Event	Swim	Trans 1	Bike	Trans 2	Run	Total Time	Rank
Jetze Plat	Men's PTWC	12:39	1:11	30:31	0:47	12:43	57:51	1st place, gold medalist(s)
Geert Schipper	Men's PTWC	14:03	1:18	34:04	0:49	12:47	1:03:01	4
Margret IJdema	Women's PTWC	13:29	2:04	42:24	1:11	17:47	1:16:55	7

== Rowing ==
Netherlands qualified one boat in the mixed double sculls for the games by winning the silver medal at the 2019 World Rowing Championships in Ottensheim, Austria and securing the second of eight available place.

Athlete	Event	Heats		Repechage		Final	
Athlete	Event	Time	Rank	Time	Rank	Time	Rank
Annika van der Meer; Corné de Koning	Mixed double sculls	8:55.16	2 R	8:10.35	1 FA	8:43.85	2nd place, silver medalist(s)

Qualification Legend: FA=Final A (medal); FB=Final B (non-medal); R=Repechage

== Swimming ==
Five Dutch swimmers have qualified to compete in swimming at the 2020 Summer Paralympics via the 2019 World Para Swimming Championships slot allocation method & 10 qualified via MQS.

Men

Athlete	Event	Heats		Final	
Athlete	Event	Result	Rank	Result	Rank
Rogier Dorsman	100 m freestyle S11	1:10.51	2 Q	1:10.10	4
Rogier Dorsman	400 m freestyle S11	4:30.23	1 Q	4:28.47	1st place, gold medalist(s)
Rogier Dorsman	100 m breaststroke SB11	1:11.91	1 Q	1:11.22	1st place, gold medalist(s)
Rogier Dorsman	100 m butterfly S11	1:05.64	3 Q	1:05.67	4
Rogier Dorsman	200 m individual medley SM11	2:20.75	1 Q	2:19.02	1st place, gold medalist(s)
Marc Evers	100 m butterfly S14	58.91	14	did not advance	
Marc Evers	200 m individual medley SM14	2:13.10	3 Q	2:13.25	8
Marc Evers	100 m backstroke S14	1:03.98	13	did not advance	
Tim van Duuren	100 m breaststroke SB8	1:10.36	3 Q	1:10.55	4
Querijn Hensen	50 m freestyle S10	25.58	10	did not advance	
Querijn Hensen	100 m backstroke S10	1:01.87	3 Q	1:02.19	6
Thijs van Hofweegen	100 m freestyle S6	1:07.70	5 Q	1:06.39	5
Thijs van Hofweegen	100 m backstroke S6	1:20.26	6 Q	1:19.69	7
Bas Takken	100 m freestyle S10	53.94	6 Q	54.06	6
Bas Takken	400 m freestyle S10	4:07.17	1 Q	4:02.02	2nd place, silver medalist(s)
Bas Takken	100 m backstroke S10	1:01.89	4 Q	1:01.52	5
Bas Takken	200 m individual medley SM10	2:16.91	3 Q	2:11.39	3rd place, bronze medalist(s)
Thomas van Wanrooij	100 m backstroke S13	1:00.48	2 Q	1:00.50	5
Thomas van Wanrooij	100 m breaststroke SB13	1:06.83	6 Q	1:06.75	6
Thomas van Wanrooij	200 m individual medley SM13	2:11.12	2 Q	2:10.79	3rd place, bronze medalist(s)
Tim van Duuren; Querijn Hensen; Thijs van Hofweegen; Bas Takken	4x100 m medley relay 34 points	4:19.68	2 Q	4:22.25	5

Women

Athlete	Event	Heats		Final	
Athlete	Event	Result	Rank	Result	Rank
Liesette Bruinsma	50 m freestyle S11	30.26	4 Q	30.19	4
Liesette Bruinsma	100 m freestyle S11	1:07.69	2 Q	1:06.55	2nd place, silver medalist(s)
Liesette Bruinsma	400 m freestyle S11	5:10.33	2 Q	5:05.34	2nd place, silver medalist(s)
Liesette Bruinsma	100 m breaststroke SB11	1:28.19	3 Q	1:27.29	4
Liesette Bruinsma	200 m individual medley SM11	2:50.70	4 Q	2:50.78	6
Lisa Kruger	100 m freestyle S10	1:01.75	5 Q	1:00.68	3rd place, bronze medalist(s)
Lisa Kruger	100 m breaststroke SB9	1:13.83	2 Q	1:13.91	2nd place, silver medalist(s)
Lisa Kruger	100 m backstroke S10	1:10.81	4 Q	1:09.44	3rd place, bronze medalist(s)
Lisa Kruger	200 m individual medley SM10	2:30.73	2 Q	2:27.86	3rd place, bronze medalist(s)
Chantalle Zijderveld	50 m freestyle S10	28.07	3 Q	27.42	2nd place, silver medalist(s)
Chantalle Zijderveld	100 m freestyle S10	1:01.51	3 Q	1:00.23	2nd place, silver medalist(s)
Chantalle Zijderveld	100 m breaststroke SB9	1:11.23 WR	1 Q	1:10.99 WR	1st place, gold medalist(s)
Chantalle Zijderveld	100 m butterfly SB10	—N/a		1:07.91	3rd place, bronze medalist(s)
Chantalle Zijderveld	200 m individual medley SM10	2:28.40	1 Q	2:24.85 WR	1st place, gold medalist(s)

== Table tennis ==
Two female players have qualified to compete.

Women

Athlete	Event	Group Stage			Quarterfinals	Semifinals	Final	
Athlete	Event	Opposition Result	Opposition Result	Rank	Opposition Result	Opposition Result	Opposition Result	Rank
Kelly van Zon	Individual C7	Perez Villalba (MEX); W 3-0	Barneoud (FRA); L 2-3	2 Q	Kim (KOR); W 3-1	Korkut (TUR); W 3-1	Safonova (RPC); W 3-2	1st place, gold medalist(s)
Frederique van Hoof	Individual C8	Kamkasomphou (FRA); L 1-3	Arloy (HUN); L 0-3	3	did not advance			
Frederique van Hoof; Kelly van Zon	Team C6-8	—N/a			Norway (NOR); W 2-0	RPC (RPC); W 2-1	China (CHN); L 0-2	2nd place, silver medalist(s)

== Wheelchair basketball ==
=== Women's tournament ===
The women's wheelchair basketball team qualified for the 2020 Summer Paralympics after their results at the 2018 Wheelchair Basketball World Championship.

The following is the Netherlands roster in the women's wheelchair basketball tournament of the 2020 Summer Paralympics.

Netherlands women's national wheelchair basketball team - 2020 Summer Paralympics roster
Players
Coaches

No.	Name	Age – Date of birth	Pts.
1	Anouk Taggenbrock	27 – 13 August 1994	2.5
2	Ilse Arts	31 – 7 June 1990	1.5
4	Sylvana van Hees	28 – 4 April 1993	1.5
5	Lindsay Frelink	22 – 6 August 1999	2.0
6	Jitske Visser	28 – 29 October 1992	1.0
8	Julia van der Sprong	21 – 27 September 1999	3.5
9	Bo Kramer	22 – 15 September 1998	4.5
10	Xena Wimmenhoeve	21 – 14 May 2000	4.0
11	Cher Korver	45 – 11 August 1976	2.5
12	Saskia Pronk	38 – 6 August 1983	1.0
14	Carina de Rooij	41 – 10 May 1980	3.0
15	Mariska Beijer	30 – 29 June 1991	4.0

Head coach

Gertjan van der Linden

Assistant coach(es)

Irene Sloof

Legend

- Age - describes age on 24 August 2021

Group B

Pos	Team	Pld	W	L	PF	PA	PD	Pts	Qualification
1	China	4	4	0	207	133	+74	8	Quarter-finals
2	Netherlands	4	3	1	278	145	+133	7	Quarter-finals
3	United States	4	2	2	229	165	+64	6	Quarter-finals
4	Spain	4	1	3	167	185	−18	5	Quarter-finals
5	Algeria	4	0	4	72	325	−253	4	9th/10th place playoff

Source: TOCOG
Rules for classification: 1) Points; 2) Head-to-head results; 3) Points difference; 4) Points scored.

25 August 2021
11:15

Report

Netherlands	68–58	United States
Scoring by quarter: 14–16, 20–20, 16–16, 18–6
Pts: Beijer 28; Rebs: Beijer 12; Asts: Visser 12		Pts: Zurbrugg 20; Rebs: Hollermann, Schneider 9 Asts: Ryan 12

Musashino Forest Sport Plaza
Referees: Juan Urunuela

26 August 2021
20:30

Report

China	45–38	Netherlands
Scoring by quarter: 10–9, 8–15, 8–0, 19–14
Pts: Lin 17; Rebs: Zhang X. 15; Asts: Lin, Zhang X. 4		Pts: Korver 12; Rebs: Beijer 7 Asts: Korver 4

Ariake Arena
Referees: Helen Rosenberg

27 August 2021
11:15

Report

Netherlands	109–18	Algeria
Scoring by quarter: 23–0, 34–12, 22–6, 30–0
Pts: Beijer 33; Rebs: Beijer 11; Asts: Kramer 11		Pts: Khemgani 7 Rebs: Khemgani 6 Asts: Khedir, Khemgani 2

Ariake Arena
Referees: Hiroki Ono

29 August 2021
9:00

Report

Spain	24–63	Netherlands
Scoring by quarter: 7–23, 4–10, 11–18, 2–12
Pts: Perez 5 Rebs: Lopez 7 Asts: six players 1		Pts: Beijer 22; Rebs: Beijer, Kramer 9 Asts: Beijer 5

Ariake Arena
Referees: Yap Poh Boon

Quarter-final

31 August 2021
20:45

Report

Netherlands	82–24	Japan
Scoring by quarter: 28–6, 18–6, 20–8, 16–4
Pts: Beijer 38; Rebs: Kramer 17; Asts: Kramer 9		Pts: four players 4 Rebs: Kitada 6 Asts: Amimoto 4

Ariake Arena
Referees: Sebastien Gauthier

Semi-final

2 September 2021
18:15

Report

Germany	42–52	Netherlands
Scoring by quarter: 12–16, 13–10, 11–9, 6–17
Pts: Lang 18; Rebs: Lang 8 Asts: Lang 5		Pts: Beijer 30; Rebs: Beijer 19; Asts: Visser 6

Ariake Arena
Attendance: 279
Referees: Sebastien Gauthier

Final

4 September 2021
20:30

Report

(gold) Netherlands	50–31	China (silver)
Scoring by quarter: 9–12, 12–2, 12–6, 17–11
Pts: Kramer 15; Rebs: Kramer 9 Asts: Kramer, Visser 5		Pts: Lin 9 Rebs: Zhang X. 11; Asts: Zhang T. 5

Ariake Arena
Attendance: 30
Referees: Linas Radykas

== Wheelchair tennis ==
Netherlands qualified eight players entries for wheelchair tennis. All of them qualified by the world rankings.

Athlete	Event	Round of 64	Round of 32	Round of 16	Quarterfinals	Semifinals	Final / BM	
Athlete	Event	Opposition Result	Opposition Result	Opposition Result	Opposition Result	Opposition Result	Opposition Result	Rank
Carlos Anker	Men's singles	Sanada (JPN); L 1–6, 1–6	did not advance					
Tom Egberink	Men's singles	Bye	Borhan (MAS); W 6–0, 6–1	Olsson (SWE); W 1–6, 6–7, 6–3	Caverzaschi (ESP); W 6–4, 6–3	Hewett (GBR); W 6–4, 7–6	Kunieda (JPN); L 1-6, 2-6	2nd place, silver medalist(s)
Maikel Scheffers	Men's singles	Stroud (USA); W 6–4, 6–3	Ji (CHN); L 4–6, 4–6	did not advance				
Ruben Spaargaren	Men's singles	Riegler (AUT); W 6–0, 6–1	Cataldo (CHI); W 6–2, 6–3	Hewett (GBR); L 1–6, 6–2, 3–6	did not advance			
Carlos Anker; Ruben Spaargaren	Men's doubles	—N/a	Bye	Cataldo / Sepulveda (CHI); W 6–1, 7-5	Kunieda / Sanada (JPN); L 6–7, 3–6	did not advance		
Tom Egberink; Maikel Scheffers	Men's doubles	—N/a	Bye	Berdichevsky / Sasson (ISR); W 6–1, 6–1	Fernández / Ledesma (ARG); W 6–1, 3–6, 7-5	Houdet / Peifer (FRA); L 2–6, 4–6	Kunieda / Sanada (JPN); W 6-3, 6-2	3rd place, bronze medalist(s)
Diede de Groot	Women's singles	—N/a	Cabrillana (CHI); W 6–0, 6–1	Huang (CHN); W 6–0, 6–2	Ohtani (JPN); W 6–3, 6–2	Whiley (GBR); W 6–4, 6–2	Kamiji (JPN); W 6–3, 7-6	1st place, gold medalist(s)
Aniek van Koot	Women's singles	—N/a	Kruger (GER); W 6–3, 6–1	Mörch (FRA); W 6–3, 6–0	Wang (CHN); W 7–6, 2–6, 6–2	Kamiji (JPN); L 2-6, 2-6	Whiley (GBR); L 4-6, 7-6, 4-6	4
Diede de Groot; Aniek van Koot	Women's doubles	—N/a		Bye	Bubnova / Lvova (RPC); W 6–1, 6–2	Kamiji / Ohtani (JPN); W 6–2, 6–4	Shuker / Whiley (GBR); W 6–0, 6–1	1st place, gold medalist(s)
Sam Schröder	Quad singles	—N/a		Saadon (ISR); W 6–1, 6–2	Davidson (AUS); W 6–2, 6–1	Sugeno (JPN); W 6–2, 6–3	Alcott (AUS); L 6-7 1-6	2nd place, silver medalist(s)
Niels Vink	Quad singles	—N/a		Weinberg (ISR); W 6–0, 6–3	Lapthorne (GBR); W 6–4, 6–1	Alcott (AUS); L 4–6, 6–3, 4–6	Sugeno (JPN); W 6–1, 6–4	3rd place, bronze medalist(s)
Sam Schröder; Niels Vink	Quad doubles	—N/a			Barten / Wagner (USA); W 6–2, 6–1	Cotterill / Lapthorne (GBR); W 6–0, 6–2	Alcott / Davidson (AUS); W 6–4, 6–3	1st place, gold medalist(s)

== See also ==
- Netherlands at the Paralympics
- Netherlands at the 2020 Summer Olympics
