= Swimming at the 2020 Summer Paralympics – Women's 200 metre individual medley SM10 =

Women's 200 metre individual medley SM10 at the XVI Paralympic Games
- Venue: Tokyo Aquatics Centre
- Dates: 3 September 2021
- Competitors: 10 from 8 nations

Medalists
1st place, gold medalist(s)		Chantalle Zijderveld	Netherlands
2nd place, silver medalist(s)		Bianka Pap	Hungary
3rd place, bronze medalist(s)		Lisa Kruger	Netherlands

The Women's 200 metre individual medley SM10 event at the 2020 Paralympic Games took place on 3 September 2021, at the Tokyo Aquatics Centre.

== Heats ==
The swimmers with the top eight times, regardless of heat, advanced to the final.

Rank	Heat	Lane	Name	Nationality	Time	Notes
1	2	4	Chantalle Zijderveld	Netherlands	2:28.40	Q
2	1	4	Lisa Kruger	Netherlands	2:30.73	Q
3	1	5	Jasmine Greenwood	Australia	2:31.98	Q
4	2	5	Bianka Pap	Hungary	2:33.10	Q
5	2	3	Aurélie Rivard	Canada	2:34.52	Q
6	1	3	Mikaela Jenkins	United States	2:35.81	Q
7	1	2	Zhang Meng	China	2:36.23	Q
8	1	6	Keira Stephens	Australia	2:38.94	Q
9	2	2	Elizaveta Sidorenko	RPC	2:41.68	
-	2	6	Oliwia Jabłońska	Poland	DNS	

== Final ==
Rank	Lane	Name	Nationality	Time	Notes
1st place, gold medalist(s)	4	Chantalle Zijderveld	Netherlands	2:24.85	WR
2nd place, silver medalist(s)	6	Bianka Pap	Hungary	2:26.12	
3rd place, bronze medalist(s)	5	Lisa Kruger	Netherlands	2:27.86	
4	2	Aurélie Rivard	Canada	2:28.73	AM
5	3	Jasmine Greenwood	Australia	2:31.06	
6	1	Zhang Meng	China	2:35.26	
7	7	Mikaela Jenkins	United States	2:36.34	
8	8	Keira Stephens	Australia	2:37.76	
