= Swimming at the 2020 Summer Paralympics – Women's 100 metre freestyle S10 =

Women's 100 metre freestyle S10 at the XVI Paralympic Games
- Venue: Tokyo Aquatics Centre
- Dates: 28 August 2021
- Competitors: 14 from 13 nations

Medalists
1st place, gold medalist(s)		Aurélie Rivard	Canada
2nd place, silver medalist(s)		Chantalle Zijderveld	Netherlands
3rd place, bronze medalist(s)		Lisa Kruger	Netherlands

The Women's 100 metre freestyle S10 event at the 2020 Paralympic Games took place on 28 August 2021, at the Tokyo Aquatics Centre.

== Heats ==
The swimmers with the top eight times, regardless of heat, advanced to the final.

Rank	Heat	Lane	Name	Nationality	Time	Notes
1	2	4	Aurélie Rivard	Canada	58.60	Q, WR
2	1	5	Bianka Pap	Hungary	1:01.46	Q
3	1	4	Chantalle Zijderveld	Netherlands	1:01.51	Q
4	1	6	María Barrera Zapata	Colombia	1:01.69	Q
5	2	5	Lisa Kruger	Netherlands	1:01.75	Q
6	1	3	Jasmine Greenwood	Australia	1:01.99	Q
7	2	5	Zara Mullooly	Great Britain	1:02.18	Q
8	2	6	Alessia Scortechini	Italy	1:02.31	Q
9	1	2	Anastasiia Gontar	RPC	1:02.39	
10	2	1	Emeline Pierre	France	1:04.39	
11	2	7	Oliwia Jabłońska	Poland	1:04.44	
12	2	2	Stefanny Rubi Cristino Zapata	Mexico	1:04.51	
13	1	1	Susannah Kaul	Estonia	1:05.10	
	1	7	Elizaveta Sidorenko	RPC	DNS	

== Final ==
100m freestyle final
Rank	Lane	Name	Nationality	Time	Notes
1st place, gold medalist(s)	4	Aurélie Rivard	Canada	58.14	WR
2nd place, silver medalist(s)	3	Chantalle Zijderveld	Netherlands	1:00.23	ER
3rd place, bronze medalist(s)	2	Lisa Kruger	Netherlands	1:00.68	
4	5	Bianka Pap	Hungary	1:00.80	
5	7	Jasmine Greenwood	Australia	1:01.18	
6	6	María Barrera Zapata	Colombia	1:01.38	
7	1	Zara Mullooly	Great Britain	1:01.71	
8	8	Alessia Scortechini	Italy	1:02.97	
