= Swimming at the 2020 Summer Paralympics – Women's 100 metre breaststroke SB9 =

Women's 100 metre breaststroke SB9 at the XVI Paralympic Games
- Venue: Tokyo Aquatics Centre
- Dates: 26 August 2021
- Competitors: 12 from 10 nations

Medalists
1st place, gold medalist(s)		Chantalle Zijderveld	Netherlands
2nd place, silver medalist(s)		Lisa Kruger	Netherlands
3rd place, bronze medalist(s)		Keira Stephens	Australia

The Women's 100 metre breaststroke SB9 event at the 2020 Paralympic Games took place on 26 August 2021, at the Tokyo Aquatics Centre.

== Heats ==
The swimmers with the top eight times, regardless of heat, advanced to the final.

Rank	Heat	Lane	Name	Nationality	Time	Notes
1	2	4	Chantalle Zijderveld	Netherlands	1:11.23	Q, WR
2	1	4	Lisa Kruger	Netherlands	1:13.83	Q
3	1	5	Daniela Giménez	Argentina	1:18.88	Q
4	2	5	Keira Stephens	Australia	1:19.08	Q
5	1	3	Zhang Meng	China	1:19.22	Q
6	2	6	Sarai Gascon	Spain	1:20.53	Q
7	2	2	Bianka Pap	Hungary	1:23.45	Q
8	1	2	Mikaela Jenkins	United States	1:24.89	Q
9	1	7	Lucia Dabezies	Uruguay	1:25.54	
10	2	7	Summer Schmit	United States	1:25.91	
11	1	6	Tatyana Leburn	Belgium	1:27.96	
	2	3	Elizaveta Sidorenko	RPC	DNS	

== Final ==
100m breaststroke final
Rank	Lane	Name	Nationality	Time	Notes
1st place, gold medalist(s)	4	Chantalle Zijderveld	Netherlands	1:10.99	WR
2nd place, silver medalist(s)	5	Lisa Kruger	Netherlands	1:13.91	
3rd place, bronze medalist(s)	6	Keira Stephens	Australia	1:17.59	
4	3	Daniela Giménez	Argentina	1:18.70	
5	7	Sarai Gascon	Spain	1:19.93	
6	2	Zhang Meng	China	1:20.02	
7	1	Bianka Pap	Hungary	1:22.00	
8	8	Mikaela Jenkins	United States	1:23.89	
