= Wheelchair basketball at the 2020 Summer Paralympics – Women's team rosters =

This is a list of players that participated in the women's wheelchair basketball competition at the 2020 Summer Paralympics.

== Group A ==
=== Australia ===
The following is the Australia roster in the women's wheelchair basketball tournament of the 2020 Summer Paralympics.

Australia women's national wheelchair basketball team - 2020 Summer Paralympics roster
Players
Coaches

No.	Name	Age – Date of birth	Pts.
4	Sarah Vinci	29 – 4 December 1991	1.0
5	Jessica Cronje	23 – 25 January 1998	4.0
6	Hannah Dodd	29 – 27 April 1992	1.0
7	Shelley Cronau	36 – 29 May 1985	2.5
8	Georgia Munro-Cook	27 – 17 May 1994	4.5
10	Bree Mellberg	31 – 14 April 1990	3.0
13	Taishar Ovens	23 – 7 April 1998	1.0
14	Ella Sabljak	29 – 17 October 1991	1.0
15	Amber Merritt	28 – 17 February 1993	4.5
21	Mary Friday	23 – 2 April 1998	1.0
22	Isabel Martin	22 – 11 March 1999	1.0
23	Natalie Alexander	30 – 6 April 1991	2.5

Head coach

Craig Friday

Assistant coach(es)

Craig Campbell, Sarah Graham

Legend

- Age - describes age on 24 August 2021

=== Canada ===
The following is the Canada roster in the women's wheelchair basketball tournament of the 2020 Summer Paralympics.

Canada women's national wheelchair basketball team - 2020 Summer Paralympics roster
Players
Coaches

No.	Name	Age – Date of birth	Pts.
4	Rosalie Lalonde	24 – 27 March 1997	3.0
5	Elodie Tessier	25 – 14 March 1996	2.5
6	Arinn Young	25 – 10 July 1996	4.5
7	Cindy Ouellet	32 – 8 December 1988	3.5
8	Tamara Steeves	31 – 23 September 1989	1.5
9	Danielle Duplessis	24 – 17 July 1997	4.5
10	Puisand Lai	21 – 29 July 2000	1.0
11	Tara Llanes	44 – 28 November 1976	1.5
12	Sandrine Berube	22 – 5 February 1999	4.5
13	Kady Dandeneau	31 – 25 January 1990	4.5
15	Melanie Hawtin	33 – 20 July 1988	1.0

Head coach

Marc Ducharme

Assistant coach(es)

Simon Cass, Darrell Nordell

Legend

- Age - describes age on 24 August 2021

=== Germany ===
The following is the Germany roster in the women's wheelchair basketball tournament of the 2020 Summer Paralympics.

Germany women's national wheelchair basketball team - 2020 Summer Paralympics roster
Players
Coaches

No.	Name	Age – Date of birth	Pts.
4	Johanna Welin-Ryklin	31 – 3 August 1990	4.5
5	Mareike Miller	37 – 24 June 1984	2.0
6	Catharina Weiss	21 – 2 June 2000	1.0
7	Anne Patzwald	32 – 2 July 1989	1.0
8	Katharina Lang	28 – 2 January 1993	4.5
9	Laura Fuerst	30 – 23 April 1991	2.0
10	Lisa Bergenthal	21 – 30 November 1999	3.5
11	Maya Lindholm	30 – 20 December 1990	2.5
12	Annabel Breuer	28 – 23 October 1992	1.5
13	Svenja Mayer	30 – 21 May 1991	2.5
14	Lena Knippelmeyer	31 – 6 April 1990	4.5
15	Barbara Gross	27 – 20 November 1993	4.5

Head coach

Dennis Nohl

Assistant coach(es)

Andre Hopp

Legend

- Age - describes age on 24 August 2021

=== Great Britain ===
The following is the Great Britain roster in the women's wheelchair basketball tournament of the 2020 Summer Paralympics.

Great Britain women's national wheelchair basketball team - 2020 Summer Paralympics roster
Players
Coaches

No.	Name	Age – Date of birth	Pts.
4	Charlotte Moore	22 – 13 September 1998	1.0
5	Sophie Carrigill	27 – 19 January 1994	1.0
6	Michaela Bell	25 – 8 August 1996	1.5
7	Helen Freeman	31 – 23 November 1989	4.0
8	Laurie Williams	29 – 4 February 1992	2.5
9	Judith Hamer	30 – 3 December 1990	4.0
10	Amy Conroy	28 – 22 October 1992	4.0
11	Madeleine Thompson	26 – 29 March 1995	4.0
12	Lucy Robinson	22 – 21 May 1999	4.5
13	Siobhan Fitzpatrick	23 – 28 January 1998	3.0
14	Joy Haizelden	22 – 1 December 1998	2.5
15	Robyn Love	30 – 28 August 1990	3.5

Head coach

Simon Fisher

Assistant coach(es)

Madeleine Thompson

Legend

- Age - describes age on 24 August 2021

=== Japan ===
The following is the Japan roster in the women's wheelchair basketball tournament of the 2020 Summer Paralympics.

Japan women's national wheelchair basketball team - 2020 Summer Paralympics roster
Players
Coaches

No.	Name	Age – Date of birth	Pts.
2	Izumi Zaima	24 – 4 December 1996	1.0
4	Amane Yanagimoto	23 – 4 August 1998	2.5
5	Miki Hirai	39 – 10 September 1981	2.5
7	Mayumi Tsuchida	44 – 11 March 1977	4.0
10	Mayo Hagino	28 – 9 March 1993	1.5
12	Ikumi Fujii	38 – 2 November 1982	4.0
14	Chinami Shimizu	38 – 8 November 1982	3.0
15	Mari Amimoto	32 – 15 November 1988	4.5
18	Chihiro Kitada	32 – 12 January 1989	4.5
19	Yui Kitama	26 – 6 October 1994	1.0
22	Emi Yasuo	28 – 10 June 1993	2.0
88	Rie Odajima	32 – 1 April 1989	2.5

Head coach

Yoshiaki Iwasa

Assistant coach(es)

Kaori Tachibana, Sayaka Yamasaki

Legend

- Age - describes age on 24 August 2021

== Group B ==
=== Algeria ===
The following is the Algeria roster in the women's wheelchair basketball tournament of the 2020 Summer Paralympics.

Algeria women's national wheelchair basketball team - 2020 Summer Paralympics roster
Players
Coaches

No.	Name	Age – Date of birth	Pts.
4	Nebia Mehimda	36 – 31 July 1985	3.0
5	Naoual Khedir	34 – 13 June 1987	4.0
6	Yamina Ghoul	48 – 30 August 1972	1.5
7	Hafida Belhadef	43 – 28 March 1978	4.0
8	Fatima Bouzidi	32 – 27 August 1988	1.0
9	Djamila Khemgani	39 – 12 January 1982	4.0
11	Dahbia Semati	44 – 6 September 1976	1.5
12	Kheira Zairi	36 – 28 September 1984	4.0
13	Zohra Sellami	39 – 14 March 1982	2.5
14	Samiha Abdelali	33 – 25 April 1988	2.5
15	Nourhane Boublal	28 – 23 June 1993	4.5

Head coach

Ahmed Taghiche

Assistant coach(es)

Youcef Houri

Legend

- Age - describes age on 24 August 2021

=== China ===
The following is the China roster in the women's wheelchair basketball tournament of the 2020 Summer Paralympics.

China women's national wheelchair basketball team - 2020 Summer Paralympics roster
Players
Coaches

No.	Name	Age – Date of birth	Pts.
5	Xuejing Chen	27 – 1 September 1993	1.0
6	Xuemei Zhang	27 – 25 October 1993	4.0
7	Tonglei Zhang	27 – 5 September 1993	1.0
8	Guidi Lyu	28 – 6 May 1993	4.0
9	Suiling Lin	30 – 26 February 1991	3.0
10	Xiaolian Huang	30 – 20 September 1990	2.0
11	Jiameng Dai	26 – 7 July 1995	4.5
12	Tianjiao Lei	27 – 31 October 1993	4.5
13	Wenli Chen	31 – 4 May 1990	1.5
15	Yan Yang	23 – 2 July 1998	4.0
16	Mingzhu Deng	33 – 10 November 1987	2.0
23	Meier Chen	30 – 10 September 1990	1.5

Head coach

Qi Chen

Assistant coach(es)

Yan Han

Legend

- Age - describes age on 24 August 2021

=== Netherlands ===
The following is the Netherlands roster in the women's wheelchair basketball tournament of the 2020 Summer Paralympics.

Netherlands women's national wheelchair basketball team - 2020 Summer Paralympics roster
Players
Coaches

No.	Name	Age – Date of birth	Pts.
1	Anouk Taggenbrock	27 – 13 August 1994	2.5
2	Ilse Arts	31 – 7 June 1990	1.5
4	Sylvana van Hees	28 – 4 April 1993	1.5
5	Lindsay Frelink	22 – 6 August 1999	2.0
6	Jitske Visser	28 – 29 October 1992	1.0
8	Julia van der Sprong	21 – 27 September 1999	3.5
9	Bo Kramer	22 – 15 September 1998	4.5
10	Xena Wimmenhoeve	21 – 14 May 2000	4.0
11	Cher Korver	45 – 11 August 1976	2.5
12	Saskia Pronk	38 – 6 August 1983	1.0
14	Carina de Rooij	41 – 10 May 1980	3.0
15	Mariska Beijer	30 – 29 June 1991	4.0

Head coach

Gertjan van der Linden

Assistant coach(es)

Irene Sloof

Legend

- Age - describes age on 24 August 2021

=== Spain ===
The following is the Spain roster in the women's wheelchair basketball tournament of the 2020 Summer Paralympics.

Spain women's national wheelchair basketball team - 2020 Summer Paralympics roster
Players
Coaches

No.	Name	Age – Date of birth	Pts.
4	Lourdes Ortega Rico	23 – 22 September 1997	1.0
6	Sonia Ruiz Escribano	40 – 6 May 1981	2.5
8	Beatriz Zudaire Garcia	21 – 8 June 2000	3.0
9	Sara Revuelta Garcia	23 – 26 August 1997	1.0
11	Virginia Perez Gutierrez	33 – 12 January 1988	4.0
12	Judith Nunez Milan	35 – 30 June 1986	2.0
13	Maria Alonso Vilarino	39 – 7 July 1982	4.0
15	Almudena Montiel Cortijo	30 – 7 May 1991	2.0
44	Gabriela Navarro Rodriguez	28 – 14 October 1992	4.0
51	Agurtzane Egiluz Ibarguen	24 – 18 April 1997	3.0
55	Isabel Lopez Chavez	29 – 6 July 1992	4.5
88	Maria Ruiz Ruiz	56 – 21 December 1964	2.0

Head coach

Abraham Carrion Ruiz

Assistant coach(es)

Marta Vargas Arevalo, David Benitez Sanchez

Legend

- Age - describes age on 24 August 2021

=== United States ===
The following is the United States roster in the women's wheelchair basketball tournament of the 2020 Summer Paralympics.

United States women's national wheelchair basketball team - 2020 Summer Paralympics roster
Players
Coaches

No.	Name	Age – Date of birth	Pts.
1	Alejandra Ibanez	21 – 26 January 2000	2.5
3	Abigail Bauleke	20 – 31 July 2001	1.5
4	Zoe Voris	22 – 4 December 1998	3.5
5	Darlene Hunter	39 – 16 April 1982	1.0
7	Josie Aslakson	25 – 14 September 1995	1.0
8	Natalie Schneider	38 – 11 February 1983	4.5
15	Rose Hollermann	25 – 25 December 1995	3.5
21	Kaitlyn Eaton	27 – 17 August 1994	1.5
24	Lindsey Zurbrugg	22 – 22 September 1998	2.5
43	Bailey Moody	19 – 16 November 2001	4.0
54	Ixhelt Gonzalez	17 – 1 June 2004	4.5
55	Amy Spangler	30 – 21 September 1990	2.0

Head coach

Lawrence Johnson

Assistant coach(es)

Amy Spangler, Adam Kramer

Legend

- Age - describes age on 24 August 2021
