= Swimming at the 2020 Summer Paralympics – Women's 50 metre freestyle S10 =

Women's 50 metre freestyle S10 at the XVI Paralympic Games
- Venue: Tokyo Aquatics Centre
- Dates: 25 August 2021
- Competitors: 16 from 15 nations

Medalists
1st place, gold medalist(s)		Anastasiia Gontar	RPC
2nd place, silver medalist(s)		Chantalle Zijderveld	Netherlands
3rd place, bronze medalist(s)		Aurélie Rivard	Canada

The Women's 50 metre freestyle S10 event at the 2020 Paralympic Games took place on 25 August 2021, at the Tokyo Aquatics Centre.

== Heats ==
The swimmers with the top eight times, regardless of heat, advanced to the final.

Rank	Heat	Lane	Name	Nationality	Time	Notes
1	1	5	Anastasiia Gontar	RPC	27.48	Q
2	1	4	Aurélie Rivard	Canada	27.74	Q
3	2	4	Chantalle Zijderveld	Netherlands	28.07	Q
4	1	3	Mariana Ribeiro	Brazil	28.41	Q
5	2	3	Alessia Scortechini	Italy	28.55	Q
6	1	6	María Barrera Zapata	Colombia	28.57	Q
7	2	5	Zara Mullooly	Great Britain	28.82	Q
8	1	7	Zhang Meng	China	28.93	Q
9	2	6	Keira Stephens	Australia	29.08	
10	2	7	Susannah Kaul	Estonia	29.09	
11	1	1	Emeline Pierre	France	29.11	
12	1	2	Susana Veiga	Portugal	29.61	
13	2	8	Isabel Yingüa Hernández	Spain	30.04	
14	2	1	Stefanny Cristino	Mexico	30.08	
15	1	8	Lucia Dabezies	Uruguay	32.62	
	2	2	Elizaveta Sidorenko	RPC	DNS	

== Final ==
50m freestyle final
Rank	Lane	Name	Nationality	Time	Notes
1st place, gold medalist(s)	4	Anastasiia Gontar	RPC	27.38	
2nd place, silver medalist(s)	3	Chantalle Zijderveld	Netherlands	27.42	
3rd place, bronze medalist(s)	5	Aurélie Rivard	Canada	28.11	
4	2	Alessia Scortechini	Italy	28.26	
5	6	Mariana Ribeiro	Brazil	28.58	
6	7	María Barrera Zapata	Colombia	28.70	
7	1	Zara Mullooly	Great Britain	28.73	
8	8	Zhang Meng	China	28.96	
