= Swimming at the 2020 Summer Paralympics – Women's 100 metre backstroke S10 =

Women's 100 metre backstroke S10 at the XVI Paralympic Games
- Venue: Tokyo Aquatics Centre
- Dates: 2 September 2021
- Competitors: 8 from 7 nations

Medalists
1st place, gold medalist(s)		Bianka Pap	Hungary
2nd place, silver medalist(s)		Aurélie Rivard	Canada
3rd place, bronze medalist(s)		Lisa Kruger	Netherlands

The Women's 100 metre backstroke S10 event at the 2020 Paralympic Games took place on 2 September 2021, at the Tokyo Aquatics Centre.

== Final ==
100m backstroke final
Rank	Lane	Name	Nationality	Time	Notes
1st place, gold medalist(s)	4	Bianka Pap	Hungary	1:06.70	
2nd place, silver medalist(s)	2	Aurélie Rivard	Canada	1:08.94	
3rd place, bronze medalist(s)	6	Lisa Kruger	Netherlands	1:09.44	
4	5	Jasmine Greenwood	Australia	1:10.34	
5	3	Anaëlle Roulet	France	1:10.83	
6	7	Anastasiia Gontar	RPC	1:11.49	
7	1	Zhang Meng	China	1:12.63	
8	8	Émeline Pierre	France	1:13.52	
