= Swimming at the 2020 Summer Paralympics – Women's 100 metre backstroke =

The Women's 100 metre backstroke swimming events for the 2020 Summer Paralympics took place at the Tokyo Aquatics Centre from 25 August to 3 September 2021. A total of ten events were contested over this distance.

== Schedule ==
H	Heats	½	Semifinals	F	Final

Date	Wed 25		Thu 26		Fri 27		Sat 28		Sun 29		Mon 30		Tue 31		Wed 1		Thu 2		Fri 3	
Event	M	E	M	E	M	E	M	E	M	E	M	E	M	E	M	E	M	E	M	E
S2 100m	H	F																		
S6 100m																			H	F
S7 100m											H	F								
S8 100m					H	F														
S9 100m											H	F								
S10 100m																	H	F		
S11 100m							H	F												
S12 100m					H	F														
S13 100m			H	F																
S14 100m																	H	F		

== Medal summary ==
The following is a summary of the medals awarded across all 100 metre backstroke events.

Classification	Gold		Silver		Bronze	
S2	Yip Pin Xiu; Singapore	2:16.61	Miyuki Yamada; Japan	2:26.18	Fabiola Ramirez; Mexico	2:36.54
S6	Elizabeth Marks; United States	1:19.57 WR	Jiang Yuyan; China	1:20.65	Verena Schott; Germany	1:21.16
S7	Mallory Weggemann; United States	1:21.27 PR	Danielle Dorris; Canada	1:21.91	Julia Gaffney; United States	1:22.02
S8	Tupou Neiufi; New Zealand	1:16.84	Kateryna Denysenko; Ukraine	1:18.31	Jessica Long; United States	1:18.55
S9	Hannah Aspden; United States	1:09.22	Nuria Marqués Soto; Spain	1:10.26	Sophie Pascoe; New Zealand	1:11.15
S10	Bianka Pap; Hungary	1:06.70	Aurélie Rivard; Canada	1:08.94	Lisa Kruger; Netherlands	1:09.44
S11	Cai Liwen; China	1:13.46 WR	Wang Xinyi; China	1:13.71	Li Guizhi; China	1:16.98
S12	Hannah Russell; Great Britain	1:08.44	Daria Pikalova; RPC	1:08.76	Maria Carolina Gomes Santiago; Brazil	1:09.18
S13	Gia Pergolini; United States	1:04.64 WR	Carlotta Gilli; Italy	1:06.10	Katja Dedekind; Australia	1:06.49
S14	Bethany Firth; Great Britain	1:05.92	Valeriia Shabalina; RPC	1:06.85	Jessica-Jane Applegate; Great Britain	1:07.93

== Results ==
The following were the results of the finals only of each of the Women's 100 metre backstroke events in each of the classifications. Further details of each event, including where appropriate heats and semi finals results, are available on that event's dedicated page.

=== S2 ===
The S2 category is for swimmers who may have limited function in their hands, trunk, and legs, and mainly rely on their arms to swim.

The final in this classification took place on 25 August 2021:

Rank	Lane	Name	Nationality	Time	Notes
1st place, gold medalist(s)	4	Yip Pin Xiu	Singapore	2:16.61	
2nd place, silver medalist(s)	3	Miyuki Yamada	Japan	2:26.18	
3rd place, bronze medalist(s)	7	Fabiola Ramirez	Mexico	2:36.54	
4	5	Feng Yazhu	China	2:37.04	
5	2	Veronika Medchainova	RPC	2:40.05	
6	6	Angela Procida	Italy	2:43.58	
7	1	Zsanett Adámi	Hungary	3:11.88	
8	8	Elif Ildem	Turkey	3:13.39	

=== S6 ===
The S6 category is for swimmers who have short stature, arm amputations, or some form of coordination problem on one side of their body.

The final in this classification took place on 3 September 2021:

Rank	Lane	Name	Nationality	Time	Notes
1st place, gold medalist(s)	4	Elizabeth Marks	United States	1:19.57	WR
2nd place, silver medalist(s)	7	Jiang Yuyan	China	1:20.65	
3rd place, bronze medalist(s)	6	Verena Schott	Germany	1:21.16	
4	3	Shelby Newkirk	Canada	1:21.79	
5	2	Song Lingling	China	1:22.21	
6	5	Yelyzaveta Mereshko	Ukraine	1:22.58	
7	8	Anna Hontar	Ukraine	1:24.14	
8	1	Nora Meister	Switzerland	1:24.52	

=== S7 ===
The S7 category is for swimmers who have one leg and one arm amputation on opposite side, or paralysis on one side of their body. These swimmers have full control of their arms and trunk but variable function in their legs.

The final in this classification took place on 30 August 2021:

Rank	Lane	Name	Nationality	Time	Notes
1st place, gold medalist(s)	5	Mallory Weggemann	United States	1:21.27	PR
2nd place, silver medalist(s)	3	Danielle Dorris	Canada	1:21.91	
3rd place, bronze medalist(s)	4	Julia Gaffney	United States	1:22.02	
4	6	McKenzie Coan	United States	1:23.10	
5	2	Camille Bérubé	Canada	1:25.04	
6	7	Erel Halevi	Israel	1:40.68	

=== S8 ===
The S8 category is for swimmers who have a single amputation, or restrictive movement in their hip, knee and ankle joints.

The final in this classification took place on 27 August 2021:

Rank	Lane	Name	Nationality	Time	Notes
1st place, gold medalist(s)	5	Tupou Neiufi	New Zealand	1:16.84	
2nd place, silver medalist(s)	6	Kateryna Denysenko	Ukraine	1:18.31	
3rd place, bronze medalist(s)	3	Jessica Long	United States	1:18.55	
4	2	Xenia Francesca Palazzo	Italy	1:20.90	
5	1	Mira Jeanne Maack	Germany	1:22.77	
6	7	Mariia Pavlova	RPC	1:23.24	
	4	Viktoriia Ishchiulova	RPC	DNS	

=== S9 ===
The S9 category is for swimmers who have joint restrictions in one leg, or double below-the-knee amputations.

The final in this classification took place on 30 August 2021:

Rank	Lane	Name	Nationality	Time	Notes
1st place, gold medalist(s)	4	Hannah Aspden	United States	1:09.22	
2nd place, silver medalist(s)	5	Núria Marquès Soto	Spain	1:10.26	
3rd place, bronze medalist(s)	3	Sophie Pascoe	New Zealand	1:11.15	
4	6	Ellie Cole	Australia	1:13.15	
5	7	Elizabeth Smith	United States	1:14.24	
6	1	Zsofia Konkoly	Hungary	1:14.38	
7	2	Lina Watz	Sweden	1:14.86	
8	8	Stephanie Millward	Great Britain	1:15.49	

=== S10 ===
The S10 category is for swimmers who have minor physical impairments, for example, loss of one hand.

The final in this classification took place on 2 September 2021:

Rank	Lane	Name	Nationality	Time	Notes
1st place, gold medalist(s)	4	Bianka Pap	Hungary	1:06.70	
2nd place, silver medalist(s)	2	Aurélie Rivard	Canada	1:08.94	
3rd place, bronze medalist(s)	6	Lisa Kruger	Netherlands	1:09.44	
4	5	Jasmine Greenwood	Australia	1:10.34	
5	3	Anaëlle Roulet	France	1:10.83	
6	7	Anastasiia Gontar	RPC	1:11.49	
7	1	Zhang Meng	China	1:12.63	
8	8	Émeline Pierre	France	1:13.52	

=== S11 ===
The S11 category is for swimmers who have severe visual impairments and have very low or no light perception, such as blindness, they are required to wear blackened goggles to compete. They use tappers when competing in swimming events.

The final in this classification took place on 28 August 2021:

Rank	Lane	Name	Nationality	Time	Notes
1st place, gold medalist(s)	5	Cai Liwen	China	1:13.46	WR
2nd place, silver medalist(s)	4	Wang Xinyi	China	1:13.71	
3rd place, bronze medalist(s)	3	Li Guizhi	China	1:16.98	
4	6	Anastasiia Shevchenko	RPC	1:20.00	
5	2	Sofiia Polikarpova	RPC	1:21.52	
6	7	Maryna Piddubna	Ukraine	1:21.65	
7	1	Kateryna Tkachuk	Ukraine	1:21.76	
8	8	Martina Rabbolini	Italy	1:24.34	

=== S12 ===
The S12 category is for swimmers who have moderate visual impairment and have a visual field of less than 5 degrees radius. They are required to wear blackened goggles to compete. They may wish to use a tapper.

The final in this classification took place on 27 August 2021:

Rank	Lane	Name	Nationality	Time	Notes
1st place, gold medalist(s)	5	Hannah Russell	Great Britain	1:08.44	
2nd place, silver medalist(s)	4	Daria Pikalova	RPC	1:08.76	
3rd place, bronze medalist(s)	3	Maria Carolina Gomes Santiago	Brazil	1:09.18	
4	6	María Delgado	Spain	1:12.83	
5	7	Alessia Berra	Italy	1:14.33	
6	1	Yaryna Matlo	Ukraine	1:16.25	
7	2	Analuz Pellitero	Argentina	1:17.78	
8	8	Aliya Rakhimbekova	Kazakhstan	1:23.74	

=== S13 ===
The S13 category is for swimmers who have minor visual impairment and have high visual acuity. They are required to wear blackened goggles to compete. They may wish to use a tapper.

The final in this classification took place on 26 August 2021:

Rank	Lane	Name	Nationality	Time	Notes
1st place, gold medalist(s)	4	Gia Pergolini	United States	1:04.64	WR
2nd place, silver medalist(s)	3	Carlotta Gilli	Italy	1:06.10	
3rd place, bronze medalist(s)	5	Katja Dedekind	Australia	1:06.49	
4	2	Anna Krivshina	RPC	1:07.29	
5	8	Shokhsanamkhon Toshpulatova	Uzbekistan	1:08.37	
6	7	Róisín Ní Riain	Ireland	1:08.61	
7	6	Nigorakhon Mirzokhidova	Uzbekistan	1:09.85	
8	1	Colleen Young	United States	1:09.89	

=== S14 ===
The S14 category is for swimmers who have an intellectual impairment.

The final in this classification took place on 2 September 2021:

Rank	Lane	Name	Nationality	Time	Notes
1st place, gold medalist(s)	4	Bethany Firth	Great Britain	1:05.92	
2nd place, silver medalist(s)	3	Valeriia Shabalina	RPC	1:06.85	
3rd place, bronze medalist(s)	5	Jessica-Jane Applegate	Great Britain	1:07.93	
4	6	Madeleine McTernan	Australia	1:09.82	
5	2	Ana Karolina Soares	Brazil	1:11.29	
6	7	Chan Yui-lam	Hong Kong	1:12.49	
7	8	Kasumi Fukui	Japan	1:12.58	
8	1	Ruby Storm	Australia	1:15.38	
