= Table tennis at the 2020 Summer Paralympics – Women's individual – Class 8 =

Table tennis at the XVI Paralympic Games
- Venue: Tokyo Metropolitan Gymnasium
- Dates: 25 – 29 August 2021
- Competitors: 9 from 8 nations

Medalists
1st place, gold medalist(s)		Mao Jingdian	China
2nd place, silver medalist(s)		Huang Wenjuan	China
3rd place, bronze medalist(s)		Aida Dahlen	Norway
3rd place, bronze medalist(s)		Thu Kamkasomphou	France

The Women's individual table tennis – Class 8 tournament at the 2020 Summer Paralympics in Tokyo took place between 25 and 29 August 2021 at Tokyo Metropolitan Gymnasium. Classes 6–10 were for athletes with a physical impairment in their upper body, and who compete in a standing position. The lower the number, the greater the impact the impairment was on an athlete's ability to compete.

In the preliminary stage, athletes competed in three groups of three. The winners and runners-up of each group qualified for the knock-out stage. In this edition of the Games, no bronze medal match was held. The losers of each semifinal were automatically awarded a bronze medal.

== Results ==
All times are local time in UTC+9.

=== Main bracket ===
==== Final rounds ====
Quarterfinals
B2	Zsófia Arlóy (HUN)	12	6	11	5
C2	Aida Dahlen (NOR)	14	11	9	11
C1	Huang Wenjuan (CHN)	15	11	11
A2	Tomono Yuri (JPN)	3	4	5

Semifinals
A1	Mao Jingdian (CHN)	11	11	11
B2	Aida Dahlen (NOR) (bronze)	2	3	5
C1	Huang Wenjuan (CHN)	11	11	5	11
B1	Thu Kamkasomphou (FRA) (bronze)	7	6	11	5

Gold medal match
A1	Mao Jingdian (CHN) (gold)	11	11	11	11
C1	Huang Wenjuan (CHN) (silver)	13	5	5	9

=== Preliminary round ===
Qualified for the knock-out stage

==== Group A ====
Seed	Athlete	Won	Lost	Points diff	Rank
1	Mao Jingdian (CHN)	2	0	+27	1
7	Tomono Yuri (JPN)	1	1	–6	2
4	Juliane Wolf (GER)	0	2	–19	3

Tomono Yuri (JPN)	6	3	10
Mao Jingdian (CHN)	11	11	12

Juliane Wolf (GER)	8	5	8
Mao Jingdian (CHN)	11	11	11

Juliane Wolf (GER)	11	11	4	7	5
Tomono Yuri (JPN)	5	7	11	11	11

==== Group B ====
Seed	Athlete	Won	Lost	Points diff	Rank
2	Thu Kamkasomphou (FRA)	2	0	+25	1
6	Zsófia Arlóy (HUN)	1	1	+8	2
8	Frederique van Hoof (NED)	0	2	–19	3

Frederique van Hoof (NED)	6	6	12	2
Thu Kamkasomphou (FRA)	11	11	10	11

Zsófia Arlóy (HUN)	7	11	11	7	5
Thu Kamkasomphou (FRA)	11	7	9	11	11

Zsófia Arlóy (HUN)	12	11	11
Frederique van Hoof (NED)	10	5	3

==== Group C ====
Seed	Athlete	Won	Lost	Points diff	Rank
5	Huang Wenjuan (CHN)	2	0	+19	1
5	Aida Dahlen (NOR)	1	1	+11	2
7	Lethicia Rodrigues Lacerda (BRA)	0	2	–30	3

Lethicia Rodrigues Lacerda (BRA)	6	8	5
Aida Dahlen (NOR)	11	11	11

Huang Wenjuan (CHN)	8	12	12	11	12
Aida Dahlen (NOR)	11	14	10	7	10

Huang Wenjuan (CHN)	11	8	11	11
Lethicia Rodrigues Lacerda (BRA)	6	11	1	7
