= Swimming at the 2020 Summer Paralympics – Women's 100 metre butterfly =

The Women's 100 metre butterfly swimming events for the 2020 Summer Paralympics took place at the Tokyo Aquatics Centre from 25 August to 3 September 2021. A total of five events were contested over this distance.

== Schedule ==
H	Heats	½	Semifinals	F	Final

Date	Wed 25		Thu 26		Fri 27		Sat 28		Sun 29		Mon 30		Tue 31		Wed 1		Thu 2		Fri 3	
Event	M	E	M	E	M	E	M	E	M	E	M	E	M	E	M	E	M	E	M	E
S8 100m																			H	F
S9 100m																	H	F		
S10 100m													H	F						
S13 100m	H	F																		
S14 100m	H	F																		

== Medal summary ==
The following is a summary of the medals awarded across all 100 metre butterfly events.

Classification	Gold		Silver		Bronze	
S8	Jessica Long; United States	1:09.87	Viktoriia Ishchiulova; RPC	1:10.80	Laura Carolina González Rodríguez; Colombia	1:20.93
S9	Zsófia Konkoly; Hungary	1:06.55 PR	Elizabeth Smith; United States	1:08.22	Sarai Gascón Moreno; Spain	1:08.43
S10	Mikaela Jenkins; United States	1:07.52	Jasmine Greenwood; Australia	1:07.89	Chantalle Zijderveld; Netherlands	1:07.91
S13	Carlotta Gilli; Italy	1:02.65 PR	Alessia Berra; Italy	1:05.67	Daria Pikalova; RPC	1:05.86
S14	Valeriia Shabalina; RPC	1:03.59 WR	Paige Leonhardt; Australia	1:05.48	Ruby Storm; Australia	1:06.50

== Results ==
The following were the results of the finals only of each of the Women's 100 metre butterfly events in each of the classifications. Further details of each event, including where appropriate heats and semi finals results, are available on that event's dedicated page.

=== S8 ===
The S8 category is for swimmers who have a single amputation, or restrictive movement in their hip, knee and ankle joints.

The final in this classification took place on 3 September 2021:

Rank	Lane	Name	Nationality	Time	Notes
1st place, gold medalist(s)	4	Jessica Long	United States	1:09.87	
2nd place, silver medalist(s)	5	Viktoriia Ishchiulova	RPC	1:10.80	
3rd place, bronze medalist(s)	3	Laura Carolina González Rodríguez	Colombia	1:20.93	
4	6	Nahia Zudaire Borrezo	Spain	1:21.01	
5	2	Luz Kerena López Valdes	Mexico	1:24.05	
6	1	Cecília Jerônimo de Araújo	Brazil	1:26.26	
7	7	Morgan Bird	Canada	1:28.05	
8	8	Lourdes Alejandra Aybar Díaz	Dominican Republic	1:44.12	

=== S9 ===
The S9 category is for swimmers who have joint restrictions in one leg, or double below-the-knee amputations.

The final in this classification took place on 2 September 2021:

Rank	Lane	Name	Nationality	Time	Notes
1st place, gold medalist(s)	4	Zsófia Konkoly	Hungary	1:06.55	PR, ER
2nd place, silver medalist(s)	5	Elizabeth Smith	United States	1:08.22	
3rd place, bronze medalist(s)	2	Sarai Gascón Moreno	Spain	1:08.43	
4	6	Toni Shaw	Great Britain	1:08.87	
5	3	Sophie Pascoe	New Zealand	1:09.31	
6	1	Summer Schmit	United States	1:12.95	
7	7	Yuliya Gordiychuk	Israel	1:13.35	
8	8	Claire Supiot	France	1:16.67	

=== S10 ===
The S10 category is for swimmers who have minor physical impairments, for example, loss of one hand.

The final in this classification took place on 31 August 2021:

Rank	Lane	Name	Nationality	Time	Notes
1st place, gold medalist(s)	4	Mikaela Jenkins	United States	1:07.52	
2nd place, silver medalist(s)	5	Jasmine Greenwood	Australia	1:07.89	
3rd place, bronze medalist(s)	6	Chantalle Zijderveld	Netherlands	1:07.91	
4	3	Alessia Scortechini	Italy	1:08.62	
5	2	Oliwia Jabłońska	Poland	1:10.09	
6	7	Isabel Yingüa Hernández	Spain	1:10.79	
7	1	María Barrera Zapata	Colombia	1:10.92	

=== S13 ===
The S13 category is for swimmers who have minor visual impairment and have high visual acuity. They are required to wear blackened goggles to compete. They may wish to use a tapper.

The final in this classification took place on 25 August 2021:

Rank	Lane	Name	Nationality	Time	Notes
1st place, gold medalist(s)	4	Carlotta Gilli	Italy	1:02.65	PR
2nd place, silver medalist(s)	7	Alessia Berra	Italy	1:05.67	
3rd place, bronze medalist(s)	5	Daria Pikalova	RPC	1:05.86	
4	3	Shokhsanamkhon Toshpulatova	Uzbekistan	1:06.21	
5	1	Gia Pergolini	United States	1:06.46	
6	2	Maria Carolina Gomes Santiago	Brazil	1:07.11	
7	6	Makayla Nietzel	United States	1:08.00	
8	8	Róisín Ní Riain	Ireland	1:09.26	

=== S14 ===
The S14 category is for swimmers who have an intellectual impairment.

The final in this classification took place on 25 August 2021:

Rank	Lane	Name	Nationality	Time	Notes
1st place, gold medalist(s)	4	Valeriia Shabalina	RPC	1:03.59	WR
2nd place, silver medalist(s)	5	Paige Leonhardt	Australia	1:05.48	
3rd place, bronze medalist(s)	7	Ruby Storm	Australia	1:06.50	
4	3	Chan Yui-lam	Hong Kong	1:06.65	
5	2	Louise Fiddes	Great Britain	1:07.24	
6	6	Jessica-Jane Applegate	Great Britain	1:07.69	
7	1	Moemi Kinoshita	Japan	1:10.25	
8	8	Cheung Ho Ying	Hong Kong	1:11.29	
