= Swimming at the 2020 Summer Paralympics – Women's 100 metre butterfly S10 =

Women's 100 metre butterfly S10 at the XVI Paralympic Games
- Venue: Tokyo Aquatics Centre
- Dates: 31 August 2021
- Competitors: 7 from 7 nations

Medalists
| 1st place, gold medalist(s) | | Mikaela Jenkins | United States |
| 2nd place, silver medalist(s) | | Jasmine Greenwood | Australia |
| 3rd place, bronze medalist(s) | | Chantalle Zijderveld | Netherlands |

The Women's 100 metre butterfly S10 event at the 2020 Paralympic Games took place on 31 August 2021, at the Tokyo Aquatics Centre.

== Final ==
| Rank | Lane | Name | Nationality | Time | Notes |
|---|---|---|---|---|---|
| 1st place, gold medalist(s) | 4 | Mikaela Jenkins | United States | 1:07.52 | |
| 2nd place, silver medalist(s) | 5 | Jasmine Greenwood | Australia | 1:07.89 | |
| 3rd place, bronze medalist(s) | 6 | Chantalle Zijderveld | Netherlands | 1:07.91 | |
| 4 | 3 | Alessia Scortechini | Italy | 1:08.62 | |
| 5 | 2 | Oliwia Jabłońska | Poland | 1:10.09 | |
| 6 | 7 | Isabel Yingüa Hernández | Spain | 1:10.79 | |
| 7 | 1 | María Barrera Zapata | Colombia | 1:10.92 | |
