= Swimming at the 2016 Summer Paralympics – Women's 100 metre breaststroke SB9 =

Women's 100 metre breaststroke SB9 at the XV Paralympic Games
- Venue: Olympic Aquatics Stadium
- Dates: 8 September 2016
- Competitors: 10 from 7 nations

Medalists
1st place, gold medalist(s)		Lisa Kruger	Netherlands
2nd place, silver medalist(s)		Harriet Lee	Great Britain
3rd place, bronze medalist(s)		Chantalle Zijderveld	Netherlands

The women's 100 metre breaststroke SB9 event at the 2016 Paralympic Games took place on 8 September 2016, at the Olympic Aquatics Stadium. Two heats were held. The swimmers with the eight fastest times advanced to the final.

== Heats ==
=== Heat 1 ===
10:24 8 September 2016:

Rank	Lane	Name	Nationality	Time	Notes
1	5	Meng Zhang	China	1:20.84	Q
2	3	Paige Leonhardt	Australia	1:21.67	Q
3	4	Harriet Lee	Great Britain	1:21.97	Q
4	6	Aliaksandra Svadkouskaya	Belarus	1:27.08	Q
5	2	Airi Ike	Japan	1:27.47	

=== Heat 2 ===
10:28 8 September 2016:

Rank	Lane	Name	Nationality	Time	Notes
1	5	Lisa Kruger	Netherlands	1:15.47	WR Q
2	4	Chantalle Zijderveld	Netherlands	1:17.38	Q
3	3	Madeleine Scott	Australia	1:19.51	Q
4	6	Daniela Gimenez	Argentina	1:20.99	Q
5	2	Mei Ichinose	Japan	1:27.15	

== Final ==
18:12 8 September 2016:

Rank	Lane	Name	Nationality	Time	Notes
1st place, gold medalist(s)	4	Lisa Kruger	Netherlands	1:15.49	
2nd place, silver medalist(s)	1	Harriet Lee	Great Britain	1:16.87	
3rd place, bronze medalist(s)	5	Chantalle Zijderveld	Netherlands	1:17.01	
4	3	Madeleine Scott	Australia	1:17.93	
5	6	Meng Zhang	China	1:19.46	
6	7	Paige Leonhardt	Australia	1:20.44	
7	2	Daniela Gimenez	Argentina	1:20.90	
8	8	Aliaksandra Svadkouskaya	Belarus	1:25.74	
