= Swimming at the 2020 Summer Paralympics – Women's 100 metre freestyle S11 =

Women's 100 metre freestyle S11 at the XVI Paralympic Games
- Venue: Tokyo Aquatics Centre
- Dates: 3 September 2021
- Competitors: 12 from 7 nations

Medalists
1st place, gold medalist(s)		Li Guizhi	China
2nd place, silver medalist(s)		Liesette Bruinsma	Netherlands
3rd place, bronze medalist(s)		Cai Liwen	China

The Women's 100 metre freestyle S11 event at the 2020 Paralympic Games took place on 3 September 2021, at the Tokyo Aquatics Centre.

== Heats ==
The swimmers with the top eight times, regardless of heat, advanced to the final.

Rank	Heat	Lane	Name	Nationality	Time	Notes
1	1	5	Li Guizhi	China	1:05.92	Q, PR
2	2	4	Liesette Bruinsma	Netherlands	1:07.69	Q
3	1	4	Anastasia Pagonis	United States	1:08.92	Q
4	2	3	Cai Liwen	China	1:10.74	Q
5	1	6	Anastasiia Shevchenko	RPC	1:10.94	Q
6	2	6	Sofiia Polikarpova	RPC	1:12.46	Q
7	2	5	Maryna Piddubna	Ukraine	1:12.72	Q
8	2	7	Tomomi Ishiura	Japan	1:13.76	Q
9	1	2	Kateryna Tkachuk	Ukraine	1:14.71	
10	1	3	Ma Jia	China	1:15.25	
11	1	7	Tatiana Blattnerová	Slovakia	1:17.14	
12	2	2	Chikako Ono	Japan	1:19.82	

== Final ==
100m freestyle final
Rank	Lane	Name	Nationality	Time	Notes
1st place, gold medalist(s)	4	Li Guizhi	China	1:05.87	PR
2nd place, silver medalist(s)	5	Liesette Bruinsma	Netherlands	1:06.55	
3rd place, bronze medalist(s)	6	Cai Liwen	China	1:06.56	
4	3	Anastasia Pagonis	United States	1:06.65	
5	2	Anastasiia Shevchenko	RPC	1:10.22	
6	1	Maryna Piddubna	Ukraine	1:10.27	
7	7	Sofiia Polikarpova	RPC	1:11.52	
8	8	Tomomi Ishiura	Japan	1:13.80	
