= 2019 World Para Swimming Championships – Women's 100 metre butterfly =

The women's 100m butterfly events at the 2019 World Para Swimming Championships were held in the London Aquatics Centre at the Queen Elizabeth Olympic Park in London between 9–15 September.

== Medalists ==
Event	Gold	Silver	Bronze
S8	Alice Tai; Great Britain	Jessica Long; United States	Viktoriia Ishchiulova; Russia
S9	Sophie Pascoe; New Zealand	Toni Shaw; Great Britain	Elizabeth Smith; United States
S10	Mikaela Jenkins; United States	Alessia Scortechini; Italy	Jasmine Greenwood; Australia
S13	Shokhsanamkhon Toshpulatova; Uzbekistan	Carlotta Gilli; Italy	Rebecca Meyers; United States
S14	Valeriia Shabalina; Russia	Jessica-Jane Applegate; Great Britain	Chan Yui-lam; Hong Kong
