= Swimming at the 2020 Summer Paralympics – Women's 100 metre freestyle =

The Women's 100 metre freestyle swimming events for the 2020 Summer Paralympics took place at the Tokyo Aquatics Centre from 26 August to 3 September 2021. A total of seven events were contested over this distance.

== Schedule ==
H	Heats	½	Semifinals	F	Final

Date	Thu 26		Fri 27		Sat 28		Sun 29		Mon 30		Tue 31		Wed 1		Thu 2		Fri 3	
Event	M	E	M	E	M	E	M	E	M	E	M	E	M	E	M	E	M	E
S3 100m									H	F								
S5 100m	H	F																
S7 100m											H	F						
S9 100m											H	F						
S10 100m					H	F												
S11 100m																	H	F
S12 100m											H	F						

== Medal summary ==
The following is a summary of the medals awarded across all 100 metre freestyle events.

Classification	Gold		Silver		Bronze	
S3	Arjola Trimi; Italy	1:30:22	Leanne Smith; United States	1:37.68	Iuliia Shishova; RPC	1:49.63
S5	Tully Kearney; Great Britain	1:14.39 WR	Zhang Li; China	1:17.80	Monica Boggioni; Italy	1:22.43
S7	Giulia Terzi; Italy	1:09.21 PR, ER	McKenzie Coan; United States	1:10.22	Yelyzaveta Mereshko; Ukraine	1:11.07
S7	Giulia Terzi; Italy	1:09.21 PR, ER	McKenzie Coan; United States	1:10.22	Jiang Yuyan; China	1:11.07
S9	Sophie Pascoe; New Zealand	1:02.37	Sarai Gascón; Spain	1:02.77	Mariana Ribeiro; Brazil	1:03.39
S10	Aurélie Rivard; Canada	58.14 WR	Chantalle Zijderveld; Netherlands	1:00.23	Lisa Kruger; Netherlands	1:00.68
S11	Li Guizhi; China	1:05.87 PR	Liesette Bruinsma; Netherlands	59.13	Cai Liwen; China	1:00.25
S12	Carol Santiago; Brazil	59.01	Daria Pikalova; RPC	59.13	Hannah Russell; Great Britain	1:00.25

== Results ==
The following were the results of the finals only of each of the Women's 100 metre freestyle events in each of the classifications. Further details of each event, including where appropriate heats and semi finals results, are available on that event's dedicated page.

=== S3 ===
The S3 category is for swimmers who have leg or arm amputations, have severe coordination problems in their limbs, or have to swim with their arms but don't use their trunk or legs.

The final in this classification took place on 30 August 2021:

Rank	Lane	Name	Nationality	Time	Notes
1st place, gold medalist(s)	5	Arjola Trimi	Italy	1:30.22	ER
2nd place, silver medalist(s)	4	Leanne Smith	United States	1:37.68	
3rd place, bronze medalist(s)	3	Iuliia Shishova	RPC	1:49.63	
4	6	Ellie Challis	Great Britain	1:54.84	
5	2	Zoya Shchurova	RPC	2:07.69	
6	7	Patricia Valle	Mexico	2:08.10	
7	1	Maiara Barreto	Brazil	2:10.90	
8	8	Haideé Aceves	Mexico	2:22.60	

=== S5 ===
The S5 category is for swimmers who have hemiplegia, paraplegia or short stature.

The final in this classification took place on 26 August 2021:

Rank	Lane	Name	Nationality	Time	Notes
1st place, gold medalist(s)	4	Tully Kearney	Great Britain	1:14.39	WR
2nd place, silver medalist(s)	3	Zhang Li	China	1:17.80	
3rd place, bronze medalist(s)	6	Monica Boggioni	Italy	1:22.43	
4	5	Suzanna Hext	Great Britain	1:22.49	
5	2	Teresa Perales	Spain	1:23.31	
6	7	Lu Dong	China	1:23.34	
7	1	Yao Cuan	China	1:26.66	
8	8	Joana Neves	Brazil	1:27.62	

=== S7 ===
The S7 category is for swimmers who have one leg and one arm amputation on opposite side, or paralysis on one side of their body. These swimmers have full control of their arms and trunk but variable function in their legs.

The final in this classification took place on 31 August 2021:

Rank	Lane	Name	Nationality	Time	Notes
1st place, gold medalist(s)	5	Giulia Terzi	Italy	1:09.21	PR, ER
2nd place, silver medalist(s)	4	McKenzie Coan	United States	1:10.22	
3rd place, bronze medalist(s)	3	Yelyzaveta Mereshko	Ukraine	1:11.07	
3rd place, bronze medalist(s)	6	Jiang Yuyan	China	1:11.07	
5	2	Mallory Weggemann	United States	1:11.98	
6	8	Sabrina Duchesne	Canada	1:14.55	
7	7	Ani Palian	RPC	1:15.38	
8	1	Julia Gaffney	United States	1:15.70	

=== S9 ===
The S9 category is for swimmers who have joint restrictions in one leg, or double below-the-knee amputations.

The final in this classification took place on 31 August 2021:

Rank	Lane	Name	Nationality	Time	Notes
1st place, gold medalist(s)	3	Sophie Pascoe	New Zealand	1:02.37	
2nd place, silver medalist(s)	2	Sarai Gascón	Spain	1:02.77	ER
3rd place, bronze medalist(s)	4	Mariana Ribeiro	Brazil	1:03.39	
4	5	Toni Shaw	Great Britain	1:03.42	
5	6	Ellie Cole	Australia	1:03.49	
6	7	Ashleigh McConnell	Australia	1:03.81	
7	8	Natalie Sims	United States	1:03.85	
8	1	Emily Beecroft	Australia	1:04.47	

=== S10 ===
The S10 category is for swimmers who have minor physical impairments, for example, loss of one hand.

The final in this classification took place on 28 August 2021:

Rank	Lane	Name	Nationality	Time	Notes
1st place, gold medalist(s)	4	Aurélie Rivard	Canada	58.14	WR
2nd place, silver medalist(s)	3	Chantalle Zijderveld	Netherlands	1:00.23	ER
3rd place, bronze medalist(s)	2	Lisa Kruger	Netherlands	1:00.68	
4	5	Bianka Pap	Hungary	1:00.80	
5	7	Jasmine Greenwood	Australia	1:01.18	
6	6	María Barrera Zapata	Colombia	1:01.38	
7	1	Zara Mullooly	Great Britain	1:01.71	
8	8	Alessia Scortechini	Italy	1:02.97	

=== S11 ===
The S11 category is for swimmers who have severe visual impairments and have very low or no light perception, such as blindness; they are required to wear blackened goggles to compete. They use tappers when competing in swimming events.

The final in this classification took place on 3 September 2021:

Rank	Lane	Name	Nationality	Time	Notes
1st place, gold medalist(s)	4	Li Guizhi	China	1:05.87	PR
2nd place, silver medalist(s)	5	Liesette Bruinsma	Netherlands	1:06.55	
3rd place, bronze medalist(s)	6	Cai Liwen	China	1:06.56	
4	3	Anastasia Pagonis	United States	1:06.65	
5	2	Anastasiia Shevchenko	RPC	1:10.22	
6	1	Maryna Piddubna	Ukraine	1:10.27	
7	7	Sofiia Polikarpova	RPC	1:11.52	
8	8	Tomomi Ishiura	Japan	1:13.80	

=== S12 ===
The S12 category is for swimmers who have moderate visual impairment and have a visual field of less than 5 degrees radius. They are required to wear blackened goggles to compete. They may wish to use a tapper.

The final in this classification took place on 31 August 2021:

Rank	Lane	Name	Nationality	Time	Notes
1st place, gold medalist(s)	3	Maria Carolina Gomes Santiago	Brazil	59.01	
2nd place, silver medalist(s)	4	Daria Pikalova	RPC	59.13	
3rd place, bronze medalist(s)	6	Hannah Russell	Great Britain	1:00.25	
4	7	Alessia Berra	Italy	1:00.68	
5	2	María Delgado Nadal	Spain	1:01.49	
6	5	Lucilene da Silva Sousa	Brazil	1:02.42	
7	1	Belkis Dayanara Mota Echarry	Venezuela	1:07.60	
8	8	Yaryna Matlo	Ukraine	1:07.78	
