= Huang Wenjuan =

Chinese para table tennis player

Personal information
- Born: 9 December 2004 (age 21) Guangdong, China

Sport
- Sport: Table tennis
Medal record
Women's para table tennis
Representing China
Paralympic Games
Gold medal – first place	2020 Tokyo	Team C6–8
Gold medal – first place	2024 Paris	Singles C8
Gold medal – first place	2024 Paris	Doubles WD14
Silver medal – second place	2020 Tokyo	Singles C8
Asian Para Games
Gold medal – first place	2022 Hangzhou	Singles C8
Bronze medal – third place	2018 Jakarta	Singles C8

Huang Wenjuan (born 9 December 2004) is a Chinese para table tennis player. She won the silver medal in the women's individual C8 event at the 2020 Summer Paralympics held in Tokyo, Japan. She also won the gold medal in the women's team C6–8 event. In 2024, she won two gold medals at the Summer Paralympics held in Paris, France.
