= Éamonn Byrne =

Irish track cyclist

Personal information
- Born: March 1984 (age 42) Dublin, Ireland
- Height: 5 ft 9 in (175 cm)
- Weight: 190 lb (86 kg)

Cycling career
- Sport: Cycling
- Discipline: Track cycling
- Role: Rider

Amateur team
- Dublin Wheelers

Éamonn Byrne is an Irish track cyclist, who has represented his country at the Para-cycling Track World Championships.

== Early life ==
Éamonn Byrne grew up in Darndale in Dublin, the eldest of five children. He played soccer and participating in athletics, where he won medals for sprint events. After schooling he became a Dublin-based Garda Síochána (police) officer and began rowing for the Garda Rowing team. At age 26, he changed sporting focus to cycling.

== Cycling career ==
In May 2013 he was diagnosed with testicular cancer. He had a successful medical treatment, returning to cycling within 3 months. In 2014 he won silver medals in both the sprint and keirin and topped off his comeback by becoming Irish National Sprint Champion in 2015.

In 2018, he was part of a track tandem (with Martin Gordon) representing Ireland at the Para-cycling Track World Championships, and which set a new national record with a time of 10.539 seconds, qualifying as sixth fastest bike and progressing to the final match sprint.

=== Records ===
Byrne is co-holder of three Irish national para-cycling records, at two distances in flying-start sprinting, and one distance in standing start.
