= Swimming at the 2022 Commonwealth Games – Women's 200 metre individual medley SM10 =

Women's 200 metre individual medley SM10 at the 2022 Commonwealth Games
- Venue: Sandwell Aquatics Centre
- Dates: 2 August 2022
- Competitors: 8 from 4 nations
- Winning time: 2:33.29

Medalists
gold medal	Jasmine Greenwood	Australia
silver medal	Aurélie Rivard	Canada
bronze medal	Keira Stephens	Australia

The women's 200 metre individual medley SM10 event at the 2022 Commonwealth Games was held on 2 August at the Sandwell Aquatics Centre.

== Schedule ==
The schedule is as follows:

All times are British Summer Time (UTC+1)

Date	Time	Round
Tuesday 2 August 2022	20:51	Final

== Results ==
=== Final ===
Rank	Lane	Name	Nationality	Time	Notes
1st place, gold medalist(s)	5	Jasmine Greenwood	Australia	2:33.29	
2nd place, silver medalist(s)	4	Aurélie Rivard	Canada	2:34.26	
3rd place, bronze medalist(s)	3	Keira Stephens	Australia	2:36.68	
4	2	Toni Shaw	England	2:39.39	
5	6	Lakeisha Patterson	Australia	2:42.25	
6	7	Katarina Roxon	Canada	2:43.98	
7	1	Meghan Willis	Wales	2:44.52	
8	8	Rebecca Lewis	Wales	2:54.07	
