= Lisa Kruger =

Dutch Paralympic swimmer

- Lisa Kruger, Paralympic Champion 100m breaststroke SB9, Rio de Janeiro 2016

Personal information
- Nationality: Dutch
- Born: Lisa Kruger; 4 September 2000 (age 26) Harderwijk, The Netherlands
- Education: Medicine
- Website: www.lisakruger.nl

Sport
- Country: The Netherlands
- Sport: Swimming
- Disability: Madelung's deformity
- Disability class: S10 / SB9 / SM10
- Events: Breaststroke; Freestyle; Backstroke; Individual medley Butterfly
- Club: De Dolfijn, Amsterdam, the Netherlands
- Coached by: Bram Dekker (national). Former coaches: Sander Nijhuis (national), Kira Fijn (school), Jeanet Mulder (national), Mark Faber (national), Corrie van Gent (club)
Medal record
Women's para swimming
Representing Netherlands
Paralympic Games
Gold medal – first place	2016 Rio de Janeiro	100m breastroke SB9
Silver medal – second place	2020 Tokyo	100m breastroke SB9
Bronze medal – third place	2020 Tokyo	100m freestyle S10
Bronze medal – third place	2020 Tokyo	100m backstroke S10
Bronze medal – third place	2020 Tokyo	200m medley SM10
Bronze medal – third place	2024 Paris	100m breastroke SB9
Bronze medal – third place	2024 Paris	200m medley SM10
World Championships
Gold medal – first place	2019 London	100m backstroke S10
Gold medal – first place	2022 Madeira	100m butterfly S10
Gold medal – first place	2022 Madeira	100m breaststroke SB9
Gold medal – first place	2022 Madeira	200m medley SM10
Gold medal – first place	2025 Singapore	100m breaststroke SB9
Silver medal – second place	2019 London	200m medley SM10
Silver medal – second place	2019 London	100m breaststroke SB9
Silver medal – second place	2023 Manchester	200m medley SM10
Silver medal – second place	2023 Manchester	100m butterfly S10
Silver medal – second place	2023 Manchester	100m backstroke S10
Bronze medal – third place	2019 London	100m freestyle S10
Bronze medal – third place	2022 Madeira	100m freestyle S10
Bronze medal – third place	2022 Madeira	4x100m medley 34pt
Bronze medal – third place	2025 Singapore	200m medley SM10
European Championships
Gold medal – first place	2018 Dublin	100m butterfly S10
Gold medal – first place	2018 Dublin	200m medley SM10
Silver medal – second place	2018 Dublin	100m backstroke S10
Silver medal – second place	2018 Dublin	100m breaststroke SB9
Bronze medal – third place	2026 Kocaeli	100m breaststroke SB9
Bronze medal – third place	2026 Kocaeli	200m medley SM10

Lisa Kruger (born 4 September 2000) is a Dutch swimmer who is a member of the Dutch Paralympic team.

She competes in the S10/SB9/SM10 classifications and her best event is the SB9 100 m breaststroke, winning the Paralympic gold medal and breaking a World and Paralympic record (1.15.47) at the Summer Paralympics in Rio the Janeiro, on 8 September 2016. She competed at the 2020 Summer Paralympics, in Women's 100 metre breaststroke SB9, winning a silver medal; Women's 100 metre freestyle S10, winning a bronze medal; Women's 100 metre backstroke S10, winning a bronze medal; and Women's 200 metre individual medley SM10, winning a bronze medal.

== Arm condition ==
Kruger was born healthy in 2000, but in 2006 she fell from a wall, breaking several bones in her left arm. She had surgery which appeared to be successful. She then started with modern pentathlon (a sport where you compete in running, swimming, fencing, shooting and horseback riding). At 8 years old, she finished in 3rd place at the Dutch Youth Championships.

Her left arm started giving her more and more burden and pain and the arm started to grow crooked. She had less and less movement in her left arm and noticed that, in relation to her right arm, the left arm seemed to be shorter. She had to return to the hospital and there they discovered that the epiphyseal plate of the radius was so damaged during her fall, that one bone was no longer growing. Because the other bones in her arm are still growing, her left arm is growing crooked. This growth disorder is also known as Madelung's deformity. Only, in Kruger's case, the disorder is caused by a trauma and is not a hereditary or congenital defect. Because of these problems she had to undergo multiple surgeries, including an operation to extend the bone, where a pin was inserted to the non-growing bone, with a swivel mechanism on the outside. For three months she had to tighten the screws every day, in order to slightly lengthen the bone. This radical surgery did not do what the doctors hoped for and the doctor declared her inoperable in August 2014. As far as trying to extend the non-growing bone, the bone had been pushed over her carpal bones, which only caused her to have less movement in her wrist. So she has limited movement in her wrist, she can not turn her arm, can not put any pressure on her arm and can not hang on it. Her left arm is now about 7 centimetres shorter than the right arm and her left hand is a little bit smaller than her right hand. She has virtually no strength in her left hand and therefore 70% less strength in her left arm in comparison to her right arm. Until she stops growing she has to have regular check-ups at the Erasmus hospital in Rotterdam to see if there is a need for emergency surgery because of the imbalance.

== International career ==
Lisa Kruger made her international debut at the IPC World Championships in 2015.

Lisa Kruger participated in the Paralympic Games at Rio de Janeiro 2016 and the Paralympic Games Tokyo 2020.

To honour her accomplishments at the Paralympics in Rio de Janeiro, the city of Harderwijk named the competition pool in Harderwijk "The Lisa Kruger Pool".

== Main results ==
- World and Paralympic record in the 100 m breaststroke SB9 during the Paralympic Games 2016.
- World record in the 200 m freestyle S10 (short course) in 2014.
- World record in the 200 m backstroke S10 (short course) in 2018. (Still stands today)
- World record in the 100m backstroke S10 (short course) in 2018. (Still stands today)
- European record in the 50m butterfly S10 (short course) in 2017.
- European record in the 100m Individual Medley SM10 (short course) in 2017.
- European record in the 200m Individual Medley SM10 at the European Championships 2018.
- European record in the 200m Individual Medley SM10 (short course) in 2018. (Still stands today)
- European record in the 100m freestyle S10 (short course) in 2018. (Still stands today)
- European record in the 50m backstroke S10 (short course) in 2019. (Still stands today)
- European record in the 50m freestyle S10 (short course) in 2021. (Still stands today)

== Other information ==
- Lisa Kruger has been elected Sportswoman of the year 2019 and 2018 of the city of Harderwijk, the Netherlands
- European and Dutch Record S10 100m freestyle short course, December 2018
- European and Dutch Record SM10 200m IM short course, December 2018
- European and Dutch Record S10 50m backstroke short course, December 2018
- World, European and Dutch Record S10 100m backstroke short course, December 2018
- World, European and Dutch Record S10 200m backstroke short course, December 2018
- European and Dutch Record SM10 200m IM long course, August 2018
- European and Dutch Record SM10 200m IM long course, October 2017
- Lisa Kruger has been elected Sportswoman of the year 2016 of the city of Amersfoort, the Netherlands
- Lisa Kruger is knighted by King Willem Alexander as "Ridder in de orde van Oranje Nassau"
- World, Paralympic, European and Dutch recordholder 100m breaststroke SB9 long course.
- World, European and Dutch record S10 200m freestyle short course 2014.
- World, European and Dutch record S10 200m backstroke short course 2014.
- European -and Dutch record S10 100m freestyle, 50m backstroke en 100m backstroke short course 2014/2015.
- European - and Dutch record S10 50m backstroke short course 2016.
- Dutch record 4 × 100 m Medley relay (Kruger-den Braber-Keijzer-Vermarien).
- Participated in 5 Finals during the Paralympic games 2016. Finishing 1st 100m breaststroke, 4th 200m IM, 5th 100m backstroke, 5th 100m freestyle and 6th medley relay.

Netherlands at the 2016 Summer Paralympics

Website Lisa Kruger
