= Chantalle Zijderveld =

Dutch Paralympic swimmer

Personal information
- Nationality: Dutch
- Born: Belinda Chantalle Zijderveld; September 17, 2000 (age 25) Rotterdam, Netherlands
- Education: Bachelor of Science in Accountancy

Sport
- Sport: Swimming
- Disability: She is born without a right hand, and her right arm is shorter than her left arm. She also has scoliosis.
- Disability class: S10, SB9, SM10
- Event(s): Breaststroke; Freestyle; Individual medley Butterfly
- Club: ZPC AMERSFOORT
- Coached by: Sander Nijhuis, Bram Dekker (national) / Tom Rikhof (club)
- Retired: 2021

Achievements and titles
- Personal best: 50m freestyle 28.17, 100m freestyle 1.02.76, 100m butterfly 1.12.07, 100m breaststroke 1.16.69, 200m individual medley 2.33.10
Medal record
Women's para swimming
Representing Netherlands
Paralympic Games
Gold medal – first place	2020 Tokyo	100 m breaststroke SB9
Gold medal – first place	2020 Tokyo	200 m ind. medley SM10
Gold medal – first place	2024 Paris	100 m breaststroke SB9
Silver medal – second place	2020 Tokyo	50 m freestyle S10
Silver medal – second place	2020 Tokyo	100 m freestyle S10
Silver medal – second place	2024 Paris	Mixed 4×100 m medley relay 34pts
Bronze medal – third place	2016 Rio de Janeiro	100 m breaststroke SB9
Bronze medal – third place	2020 Tokyo	100 m butterfly S10
World Championships
Gold medal – first place	2015 Glasgow	100m breaststroke SB9
European Championships
Gold medal – first place	2014 Eindhoven	100 m breaststroke SB9
Gold medal – first place	2016 Funchal	100 m breaststroke SB9

Belinda Chantalle Zijderveld (born 17 September 2000) is a Dutch swimmer. She competed at the 2020 Summer Paralympics, in Women's 200 metre individual medley SM10, winning a gold medal; Women's 50 metre freestyle S10 and Women's 100 metre freestyle S10, winning silver medals; and Women's 100 metre butterfly S10, winning a bronze medal.

== Personal history ==
Zijderveld was born in Zwijndrecht, Netherlands in 2000. She was born without a right hand.

== International career ==
Zijderveld made her international debut in 2013, during the World Championships in Montréal. She competed in S10 classification freestyle events, but her specialty is the SB9 breaststroke, taking three European and two World titles in the 100m distance.
