= Sylvana van Hees =

Dutch wheelchair basketball player

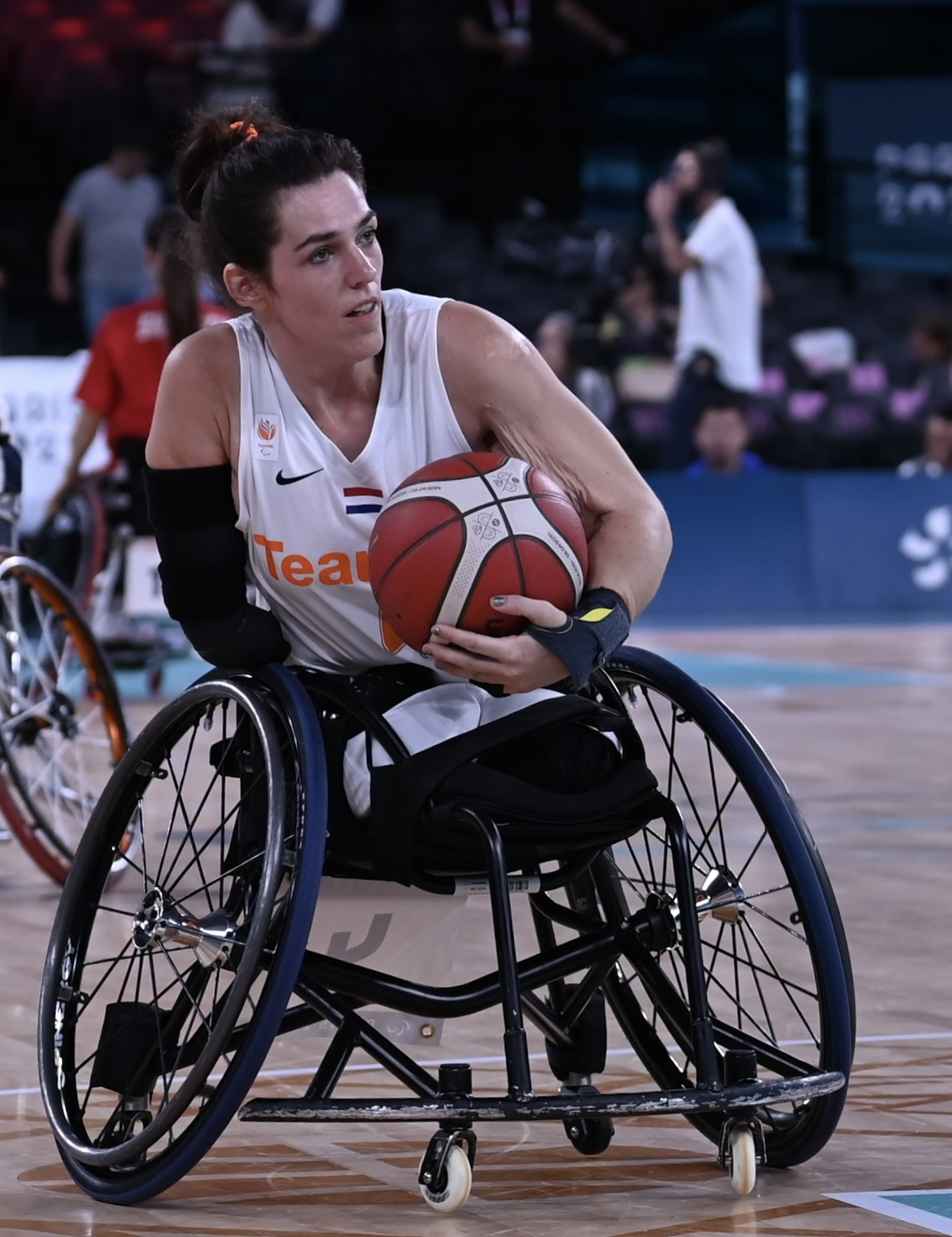

Personal information
- Born: 4 April 1993 (age 33) Roosendaal, Netherlands

Sport
- Country: Netherlands
- Sport: Wheelchair basketball
- Disability class: 1.5
- Club: Arrows '81
Medal record
Women's wheelchair basketball
Representing Netherlands
Paralympic Games
| Gold medal – first place | 2020 Tokyo | Team |
| Gold medal – first place | 2024 Paris | Team |
World Championships
| Gold medal – first place | 2023 Dubai | Team |
European Championships
| Gold medal – first place | 2019 Rotterdam | Team |

Sylvana van Hees (born 4 April 1993) is a Dutch wheelchair basketball player (1.5 disability class) and a member of the Netherlands women's national wheelchair basketball team and Doneck Dolphins Trier. With the Dutch national team, she won the gold medal at the 2020 Summer Paralympics and the 2024 Paralympic Games.

== Career ==
After a clinic she started with playing wheelchair basketball in Middelburg when she was 16 years old. After playing wheelchair basketball she lost 23 kilograms in one year. She weighed 120 kilograms in 2012 and decided to have a stomach reduction and helped her to lose a total of 70 kilograms. Currently she trains at the national Olympic training centre Papendal.

When she was two years old, she contracted meningitis and both her legs and her right forearm had to be amputated. She studied leisure management at the Rotterdam University of Applied Sciences.

She played in the Dutch Eredivision national league, with the clubs: RBVM, Arrows'81 and Rotterdam Basketball. Currently she is playing in the German competition (erste bundesliga) for the Doneck Dolphins in Trier.
