= Anouk Taggenbrock =

Dutch wheelchair basketball player

Personal information
- Nationality: Dutch
- Born: 13 August 1994 (age 32) Utrecht, Netherlands

Sport
- Country: Netherlands
- Sport: Wheelchair basketball
- Disability class: 2.5
- Club: SC Antilope Utrecht
Medal record
Women's wheelchair basketball
Representing Netherlands
Paralympic Games
Gold medal – first place	2020 Tokyo	Team
World Championship
Bronze medal – third place	2026 Ottawa	Team

Anouk Taggenbrock (born 13 August 1994) is a 2.5 disability class Dutch wheelchair basketball player and a member of the Netherlands women's national wheelchair basketball team. She won the gold medal at the 2020 Summer Paralympics, with the national team.

== Personal life ==
When she was 13 years old she received a spinal cord infection that resulted in a spinal cord injury. She studied at the University of Applied Sciences Utrecht (Business Administration, Pharmacy). After playing wheelchair tennis at elite level, she switched to wheelchair basketball after a Paralympic talent day.
