= Lindsay Frelink =

Dutch wheelchair basketball player

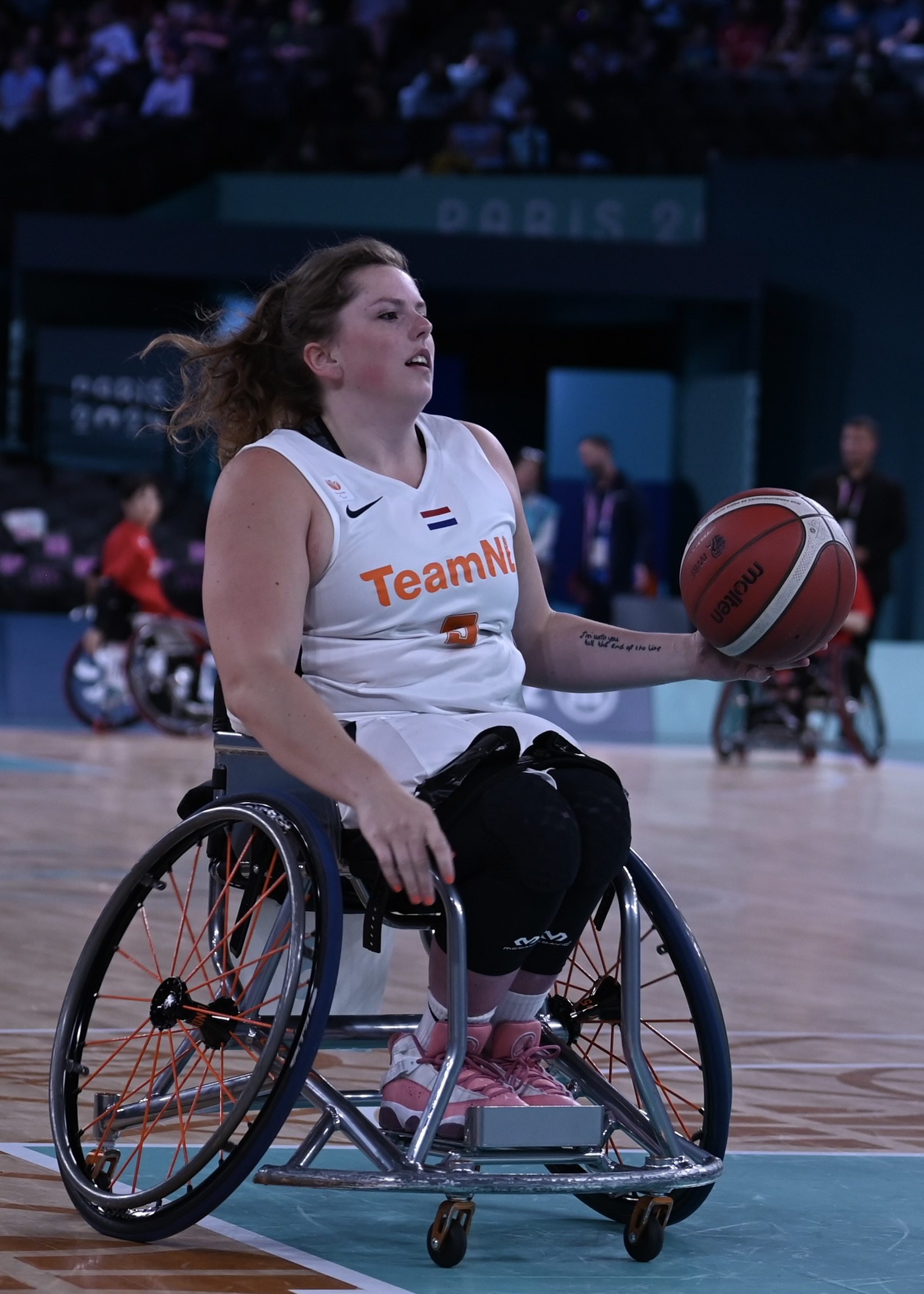

Personal information
- Nationality: Dutch
- Born: 6 August 1999 (age 26)

Sport
- Country: Netherlands
- Sport: Wheelchair basketball
- Disability: spinal cord injury
- Disability class: 2.0
- Club: Only Friends
Medal record
Women's wheelchair basketball
Representing Netherlands
Paralympic Games
Gold medal – first place	2020 Tokyo	Team
Gold medal – first place	2024 Paris	Team
World Championships
Gold medal – first place	2018 Hamburg	Team
Gold medal – first place	2022 Dubai	Team
European Championships
Gold medal – first place	2017 Tenerife	Team
Gold medal – first place	2019 Rotterdam	Team
Gold medal – first place	2021 Madrid	Team
Gold medal – first place	2023 Rotterdam	Team

Lindsay Frelink (born 6 August 1999) is a Dutch wheelchair basketball player (2.0 disability class) and a member of the Netherlands women's national wheelchair basketball team. She won the gold medal at the 2020 Summer Paralympics, with the national team.

== Life ==
Frelink was born with spina bifida. Frelink studied graphic design at Mediacollege Amsterdam. She lives in Heerhugowaard.

Frelink started with wheelchair basketball when she was 12 years old. She made her debut for the national team in 2017 and won in that year the gold medal at the European Championships in Tenerife.

She competed at the 2018 World Championship, and 2017 and 2019 European championships.
