= Carina de Rooij-Versloot =

Dutch wheelchair basketball player

Carina de Rooij
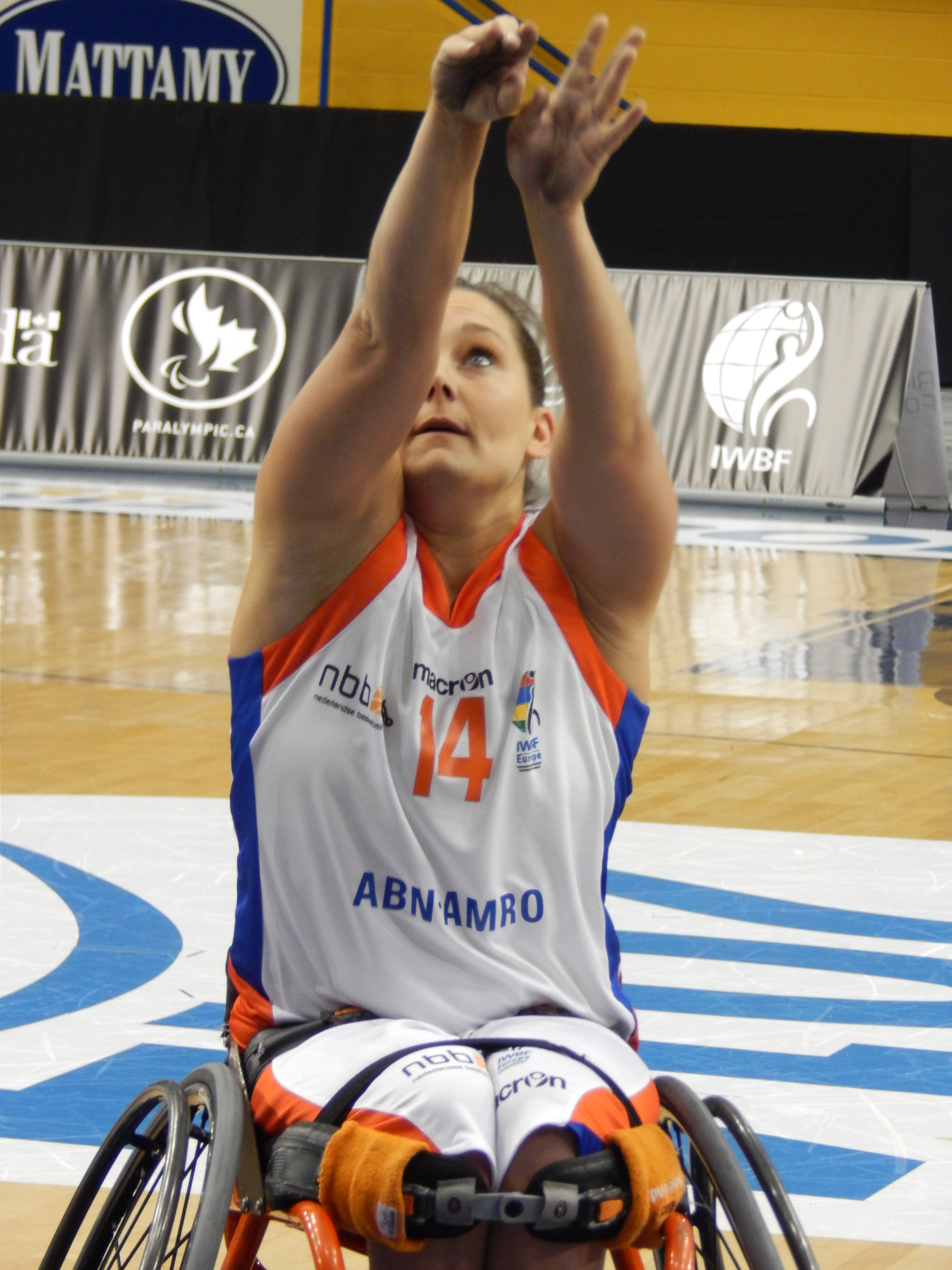
- Carina de Rooij in 2014

Personal information
- National team: Netherlands women's national wheelchair basketball team
- Born: 10 May 1980 (age 46) Zaltbommel, Netherlands

Sport
- Country: Netherlands
- Sport: Women's Wheelchair Basketball
- Disability: paraplegia
- Disability class: 3.0
Medal record
Women's wheelchair basketball
Representing Netherlands
Paralympic Games
Gold medal – first place	2020 Tokyo	Team
Gold medal – first place	2024 Paris	Team
World Championship
Bronze medal – third place	2026 Ottawa	Team

Carina de Rooij-Versloot (born 10 May 1980) is a Dutch wheelchair basketball player. She is a member of the Netherlands women's national wheelchair basketball team. She competed at four Paralympic Games and won two Paralympic bronze medal, and a gold medal.

== Early life ==
Versloot broke her back in 1999 during gymnastics training at the Hellas gymnastics club in Tiel. As a result, she had incomplete paraplegia. During her rehabilitation at the Rehabilitation Center "De Hoogsstraat" in Utrecht, she came into contact with wheelchair basketball.

== Career ==
After competing at the 2004 Summer Paralympics and 2008 Summer Paralympics she won the bronze medal at the 2012 Paralympics and also four years later at the 2016 Summer Paralympics. She also competed at other international tournaments, including the 2014 Women's World Wheelchair Basketball Championship and 2018 Wheelchair Basketball World Championship.

She is a member of the International Wheelchair Basketball Federation's Athlete Steering Committee. In daily life she is a child and youth psychologist.
