= Jasmine Greenwood =

Australian Paralympic swimmer

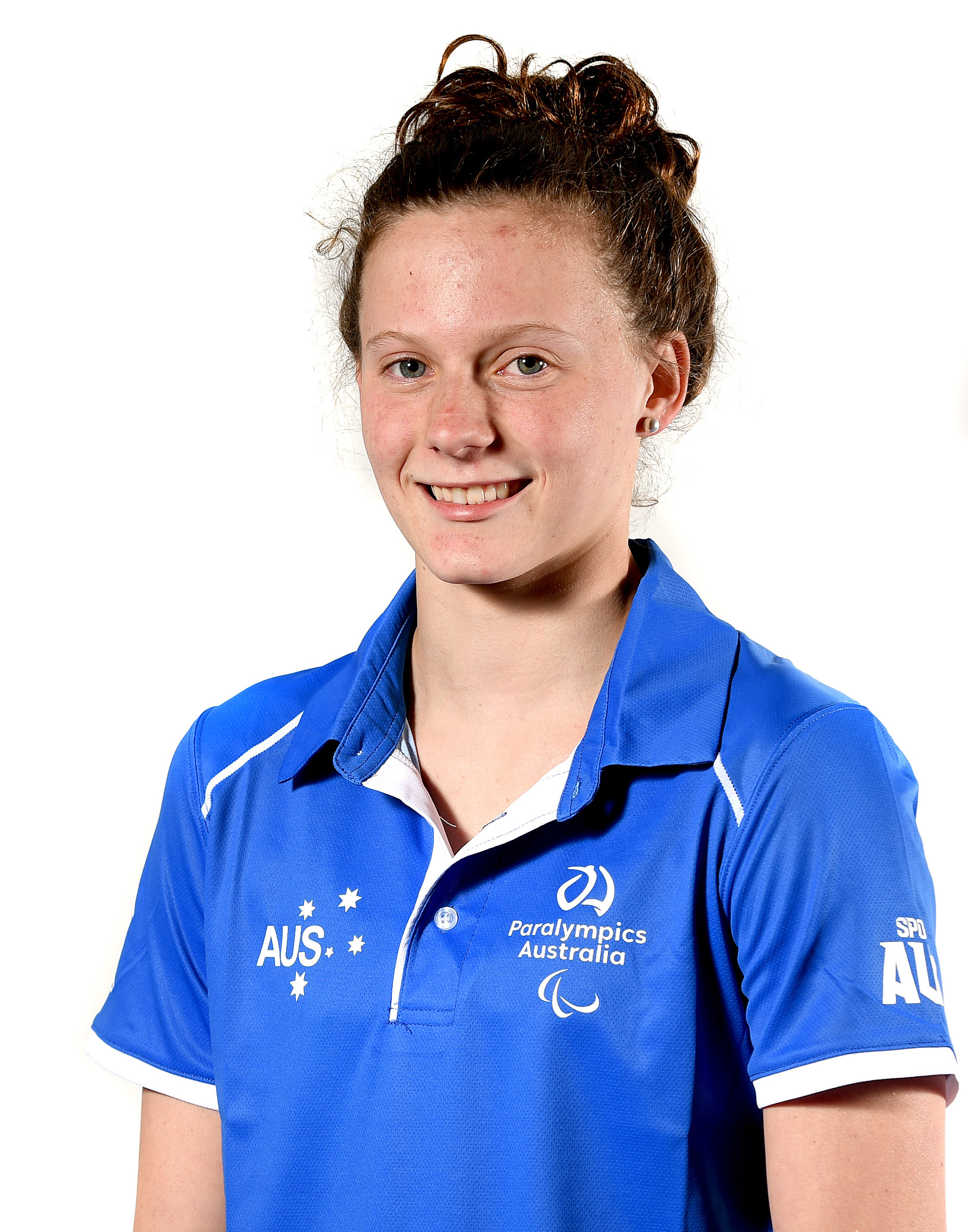
- Jasmine Greenwood in 2019

Personal information
- Nationality: Australian
- Born: 13 October 2004 (age 21) Figtree, New South Wales

Sport
- Sport: Swimming
- Classifications: S10, SB9, SM10
- Club: Woden
- Coach: Martin Roberts
Medal record
Women's Paralympic swimming
Representing Australia
Paralympic Games
Silver medal – second place	2020 Tokyo	100 m butterfly S10
World Para Swimming Championships
Silver medal – second place	2022 Madeira	100 m butterfly S10
Bronze medal – third place	2019 London	100 m butterfly S10
Bronze medal – third place	2022 Madeira	50 m freestyle S10
Bronze medal – third place	2022 Madeira	200 m medley SM10
Bronze medal – third place	2023 Manchester	100 m butterfly S10
Commonwealth Games
Gold medal – first place	2022 Birmingham	200 m medley SM10
Silver medal – second place	2026 Glasgow	200 m medley SM10

Jasmine Greenwood (born 13 October 2004) is an Australian Paralympic swimmer. At the 2020 Tokyo Paralympics, she won a silver medal in the 100 m butterfly S10 and competes at the 2024 Paris Paralympics.

== Personal life ==
Greenwood was born on 13 October 2004 in Figtree, New South Wales. In 2011, Greenwood acquired a brain injury as a result of two strokes caused by acute appendicitis and septic shock. It primarily affects the left side of her body. In 2019, she attended Shoalhaven High School and lives in Sussex Inlet, New South Wales.

In 2024, she is studying psychology at the University of Canberra.

== Career ==
Greenwood is classified as a S10 swimmer. In 2014, she decided to apply for classification to take part in para-swimming after joining the Bay & Basin Swim Club in Shoalhaven, New South Wales. At the 2018 Commonwealth Games on the Gold Coast, Queensland, she finished fifth in both the women's 100m breaststroke SB9 and women's 200m individual medley SM10. At age 13, she was the youngest athlete to represent Australia at the games.

At the 2019 World Para Swimming Championships in London, Greenwood won the bronze medal in the women's 100m butterfly S10 and was fourth in the women's 200m individual medley SM10 and women's 100m backstroke S10.

At the 2020 Tokyo Paralympics, Greenwood won the silver medal in the women's 100 m butterfly S10 with a time of 1:07.89, just 0.37 of a second behind the winner, Mikaela Jenkins of the United States. She qualified for the finals of the women's 100 m backstroke S10 (finishing fourth), the women's 100 m freestyle S10 (finishing fifth) and the women's 200 m individual medley SM10 (finishing fifth) but failed to win a medal.

At the 2022 World Para Swimming Championships, Madeira, Greenwood won three medals - silver in the women's 100 m butterfly S10 and bronze in the women's 50 m freestyle S10 and women's 200 m individual medley SM10.

At the 2022 Commonwealth Games in Birmingham, Greenwood won the gold medal in the women's 200 m individual medley SM10. At the 2023 World Para Swimming Championships, Manchester, England, she won the bronze medal in the Women's 100 m butterfly S10.

At the 2024 Paris Paralympics, she competed in four events - Women' 50 m freestyle S10 (8th), Women's 100 m backstroke S10 (6th), Women's 100 m butterfly S10 (4th) and Women's 200 m individual medley SM10 (6th).

In 2024, she is coached by Martin Roberts and has an ACT Academy of Sport scholarship.

Recognition

- 2015 – School Sports Australia Sportsmanship award at age 10, after winning eight medals at her first national schools championships.
- 2016 – Gregson Shield for Most Outstanding Para Swimmer at the New South Wales Primary Schools State Championships in Australia.
- 2019 – Junior Sports Person Award from the Shoalhaven City Council's Hall of Sporting Fame in Australia.
- 2019 – Named as one of the Kurt Fearnley scholarship winners.
- 2022 - Sport NSW Young Athlete of the Year with a Disability.
