= Zsófia Arlóy =

Hungarian para table tennis player

Personal information
- Born: 5 September 1981 (age 45) Budapest, Hungary

Sport
- Sport: Para table tennis
- Disability class: C8
- Club: Aspiration SE
Medal record
Para table tennis
Representing Hungary
European Championships
Bronze medal – third place	2005 Jesolo	Singles C8
Bronze medal – third place	2013 Lignano	Singles C8
Bronze medal – third place	2015 Vejle	Teams C9-10
Bronze medal – third place	2017 Lasko	Singles C8
Bronze medal – third place	2023 Sheffield	Doubles C20

Zsófia Arlóy (born 5 September 1981) is a Hungarian para table tennis player who competes in international table tennis competitions. She is a five-time European bronze medalist and has competed at the 2016 and 2020 Summer Paralympics.

Arlóy graduated from Corvinus University and works as an economist.
