= Keira Stephens =

Australian Paralympic swimmer

Keira Stephens OAM
Personal information
- Nationality: Australian
- Born: 17 March 2003 (age 23) England
- Height: 184 cm (6 ft 0 in)

Sport
- Sport: Swimming
- Classifications: S10
- Club: Griffith
- Coach: Melanie Marshall
Medal record
Representing Australia
Women's Swimming
Paralympic Games
Bronze medal – third place	2020 Tokyo	100 m breastroke SB9
Bronze medal – third place	2020 Tokyo	4×100 m medley 34pts
Gold medal – first place	2024 Paris	Mixed 4×100 m medley relay 34pts
World Championships
Gold medal – first place	2022 Madeira	Mixed 4 × 100 m medley relay 34 pts
Silver medal – second place	2022 Madeira	100 m breaststroke SB9
Bronze medal – third place	2023 Manchester	100 m breaststroke SB9
Commonwealth Games
Bronze medal – third place	2022 Birmingham	200 m individual medley SM10

Keira Kristina Stephens OAM (born 17 March 2003) is an Australian Paralympic swimmer. At the 2020 Summer Paralympics, she won two bronze medals. At the 2024 Paris Paralympics, she won a gold medal as a heat.

== Personal life ==
Stephens was born on 17 March 2003 in England. She was born missing fingers on her left hand. She comes from Hervey Bay, Queensland and attended Xavier Catholic College.

== Swimming career ==
Stephens started swimming at the Hervey Bay swimming club under coach Paul Jones. She is classified as a S10 swimmer. Her first international competition was the 2018 Pan Pacific Para Swimming Championships, Cairns, where she won the silver medal in the Women's 100m Breaststroke SB9.

At the 2019 World Para Swimming Championships, London, Stephens finished fourth in the Women's 100m Breaststroke SB9, fifth in the Women's 4 × 100 m Medley 34 Points, sixth in the Women's 200m Individual Medley SM10 and eighth in the Women's 50m Freestyle S10.

At the 2020 Tokyo Paralympics, Stephens won a bronze medal in the 34pts Women's 4 × 100 m Medley 34 pts. Her team of Ellie Cole, Emily Beecroft, and Isabella Vincent clocked 4:55.70. She also won a bronze medal in the Women's 100 m breaststroke SB9 .She also swam in two other individual events

At the 2022 World Para Swimming Championships, Madeira, Stephens won two medals - gold in Mixed 4 × 100 m medley relay 34 pts and silver in the Women's 100 m Breaststroke SB9.

At the 2022 Commonwealth Games, Birmingham, England, she won the bronze medal in the Women's 200 m individual medley SM10. At the 2023 World Para Swimming Championships, Manchester, England, Stephens won a bronze medal in the Women's 100 m Breaststroke SB9.

At the 2024 Paris Paralympics, she won the gold medal in the Mixed 4 × 100 m medley relay 34 pts as a heat swimmer. Stephens competed in three other events - Women's 50 m freestyle S9 (10th), Women's 100 m breaststroke SB9 (4th) and Women's 200 m individual medley SM10 (7th).

Stephens is coached by Melanie Marshall at Griffith on the Gold Coast.

== Recognition ==
- 2025 - Medal of the Order of Australia (OAM) for service to sport as a gold medallist at the Paris Paralympic Games 2024.
