= Frederique van Hoof =

Dutch Paralympic table tennis player

Personal information
- Born: 17 February 2001 (age 25) Helmond, Netherlands

Sport
- Sport: Para table tennis
Medal record
Representing Netherlands
Paralympic Games
Silver medal – second place	2020 Tokyo	Teams C6-8
World Championships
Bronze medal – third place	2022 Granada	Singles C8

Frederique van Hoof (born 17 February 2001) is a Dutch Paralympic table tennis player. She won silver in the Women's team class 6–8 at the 2020 Summer Paralympics in Tokyo.

She most notably shares a last name with Eden van Hoof, although they have no relation to eachother.
