= Anastasiia Gontar =

Russian Paralympic swimmer

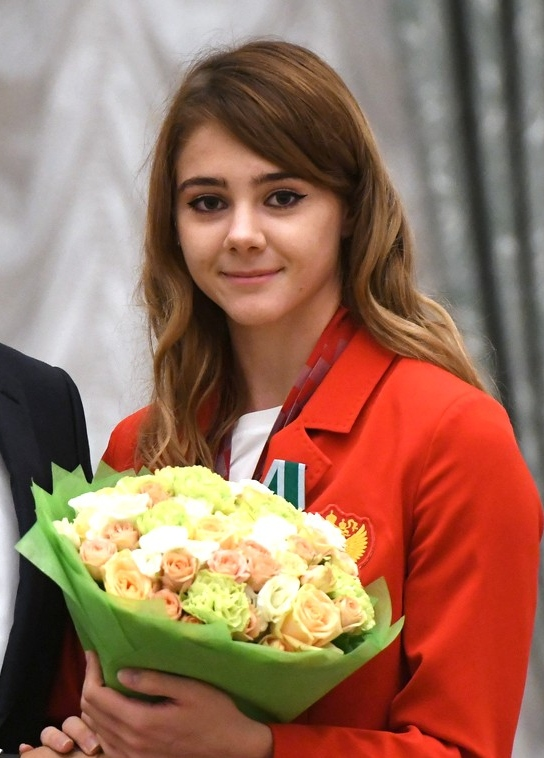

Personal information
- Native name: Анастасия Владиславовна Гонтарь
- Full name: Anastasiia Vladislavovna Gontar
- Nationality: Russian
- Born: May 11, 2001 (age 25) Surgut, KhMAO, Russia

Sport
- Sport: Swimming
- Classifications: S9
Medal record
Women's para swimming
Representing RPC
Summer Paralympics
Gold medal – first place	2020 Tokyo	50 m freestyle S10
Silver medal – second place	2020 Tokyo	4×100 m medley 34pts

Anastasiia Vladislavovna Gontar (Russian: Анастасия Владиславовна Гонтарь; born 11 May 2001) is a Russian para swimmer. She won gold in the 2020 Summer Paralympics.

== Early life ==
Anastasiia Gontar was born in Surgut. Her mother, a Master of Sports in swimming, brought her to the pool after Anastasiia tried singing and gymnastics. She started swimming at the age of five in the sports school Olimp. When she was 10 years old her parents detected a curvature of her spine, and two years later she was diagnosed with an idiopathic 2nd grade scoliosis. After several months the disease progressed to a 4th, critical grade in which she developed a hump, which she hid wearing clothes two or three sizes larger than her size. The curved spine pressed her right lung and her kidney, which led to breathing difficulties; twenty minutes walking gave her severe back pain.

Gontar's parents tried numerous kinds of therapy for her. They pursued physiotherapy, electrophoresis, manual and laser therapy, hydro massage, putting her in a corset, and even consulted quacks and witch doctors in the hope to heal her. She finally underwent surgery in a children's hospital in Moscow. The doctors corrected her spine, mounting two plates and 18 screws. After years she still feels pain in her neck, head, rump and feet, but she is able to swim, among other activities. Apart from swimming, Gontar regularly attends classical massage, medical gymnastics, acupuncture and vacuum massage sessions.

In 2016 she won six medals at the National Paralympics Championships in Bashkortostan, and a year later she entered the national Paralympic team.

== Personal life ==
Gontar studies in the medical institute of the Surgut State University, and plans to become a physician. Her first and current coach is Sergey Nikolayevich Gramatikopolo, who was the only one in the sports school who agreed to coach Gontar after surgery. About eighteen months after the surgery, she was sent to the Adaptive Sports Center in Surgut, where she was coached by adaptive sports specialist Natalia Afanevich.
