= Mikaela Jenkins =

American Paralympic swimmer (born 2003)

Personal information
- Born: March 11, 2003 (age 23) Tampa, Florida, U.S.
- Home town: Evansville, Indiana, U.S.
- Height: 5 ft 4 in (163 cm)

Sport
- Sport: Paralympic swimming
- Disability: Proximal femoral focal deficiency
- Disability class: S10, SM10
- Club: Newburgh Sea Creatures
- Coached by: Aaron Opell
Medal record
Women's paralympic swimming
Representing United States
Paralympic Games
Gold medal – first place	2020 Tokyo	100 m butterfly S10
Gold medal – first place	2020 Tokyo	4×100 m medley 34pts
World Championships
Gold medal – first place	2019 London	100 m butterfly S10
Silver medal – second place	2019 London	4x100 m freestyle 34pts
Silver medal – second place	2019 London	4x100m medley 34pts
Bronze medal – third place	2022 Madeira	100 m butterfly S10
Parapan American Games
Silver medal – second place	2023 Santiago	100 m butterfly S10
Bronze medal – third place	2023 Santiago	400 m freestyle S10

Mikaela Jenkins (born March 11, 2003) is an American former Paralympic swimmer who represented the United States at the 2020 Summer Paralympics.

== Career ==
Jenkins made her international debut for the United States at the 2019 World Para Swimming Championships where she won a gold medal in the women's 100 metre butterfly S10 event, and silver medals in the women's 4 × 100 m freestyle relay 34pts and women's 4 × 100 m freestyle relay 34pts events.

Jenkins represented the United States in the women's 100 metre butterfly S10 event at the 2020 Summer Paralympics and won a gold medal. She also competed in the women's 4×100 metre medley relay 34pts and won a gold medal.

On April 14, 2022, Jenkins was named to the roster to represent the United States at the 2022 World Para Swimming Championships. On April 29, 2023, Jenkins was named to the roster to represent the United States at the 2023 World Para Swimming Championships.

On April 29, 2024, Jenkins announced her retirement from para-swimming to focus on her final year of college and her future out of the pool. She attended Grove City College and received a molecular biology degree with a chemistry minor. She now attends medical school at Marian University, in order to pursue her dreams of becoming a physician.

== Personal life ==
Jenkins was born with proximal femoral focal deficiency and underwent a left Syme's amputation when she was eight months old.
