= Elizaveta Sidorenko =

Russian Paralympic swimmer

Personal information
- Nationality: Russian
- Born: 18 March 2003 (age 23)

Sport
- Sport: Paralympic swimming
- Disability class: S10, SB9
- Club: Omsk Regional Sports Centre of Paralympic and Deaflympic Preparation
- Coached by: Tatyana Baksheeva; Andrey Franchenko
Medal record
Women's para swimming
Representing RPC
Paralympic Games
| Silver medal – second place | 2020 Tokyo | 4×100 m medley relay 34pts |
Representing Neutral Paralympic Athletes
World Championships
| Bronze medal – third place | 2025 Singapore | 100 m breaststroke SB9 |
European Championships
| Silver medal – second place | 2024 Funchal | 50 m freestyle S10 |
Representing Russia
European Championships
| Gold medal – first place | 2026 Kocaeli | 100 m breaststroke SB9 |
| Silver medal – second place | 2026 Kocaeli | 50 m freestyle S10 |
| Bronze medal – third place | 2026 Kocaeli | 100 m freestyle S10 |

Elizaveta Sidorenko (born 18 March 2003) is a Russian Paralympic swimmer. She represented Russian Paralympic Committee athletes at the 2020 Summer Paralympics.

== Paralympics ==
Sidorenko represented Russian Paralympic Committee athletes at the 2020 Summer Paralympics and won a silver medal in the women's 4×100 metre medley relay 34pts event.
