= Zhang Meng (swimmer) =

Chinese Paralympic swimmer

Personal information
- Nationality: Chinese
- Born: 7 March 1996 (age 30)

Sport
- Sport: Paralympic swimming
- Disability class: SM10, SB9
Medal record
Women's paralympic swimming
Representing China
Paralympic Games
Gold medal – first place	2024 Paris	200 m ind. medley SM10
Silver medal – second place	2024 Paris	100 m breaststroke SB9
Bronze medal – third place	2012 London	200 m ind. medley SM10
World Championships
Silver medal – second place	2015 Glasgow	100 m breaststroke SB9
Bronze medal – third place	2015 Glasgow	200 m ind. medley SM10

Zhang Meng (born 7 March 1996) is a Chinese Paralympic swimmer.

== Career ==
Zhang represented China at the 2024 Summer Paralympics and won a silver medal in the 100 metre breaststroke SB9 event.
