= List of IPC world records in swimming =

The world records in disability swimming are ratified by the International Paralympic Committee (IPC). These are the fastest performances in swimming events at meets sanctioned by the IPC.

Races are held in four swimming strokes: freestyle, backstroke, breaststroke and butterfly over varying distances and in either individual or relay race events. Medley events combine all four strokes, again either as an individual format (swum in order: butterfly, backstroke, breaststroke, freestyle) and as a team relay (swim in order: backstroke, breaststroke, butterfly, freestyle). Competitors are allocated a classification based on their ability in the water, with records available for each event in each classification.

- 1-10: Physical disability: Classes S1, SB1, SM1 for athletes who are least physically able; S10, SB9, SM10 for those with greatest ability in the water
- 11-13: Visual impairment: Class S11 for totally blind athletes, to class S13 for athletes who have some vision, but are considered legally blind
- 14: Intellectual disability

This currently used classification system has been in use since the 2000 Summer Paralympics.

== Record lists ==
Records are recorded in men's and women's competition in both long course (50 m) and short course (25 m) swimming pools. On each list there are almost 200 records, so they are therefore presented in separate articles:

- Men's long course
- Women's long course
- Men's short course
- Women's short course

== Record holders gallery ==
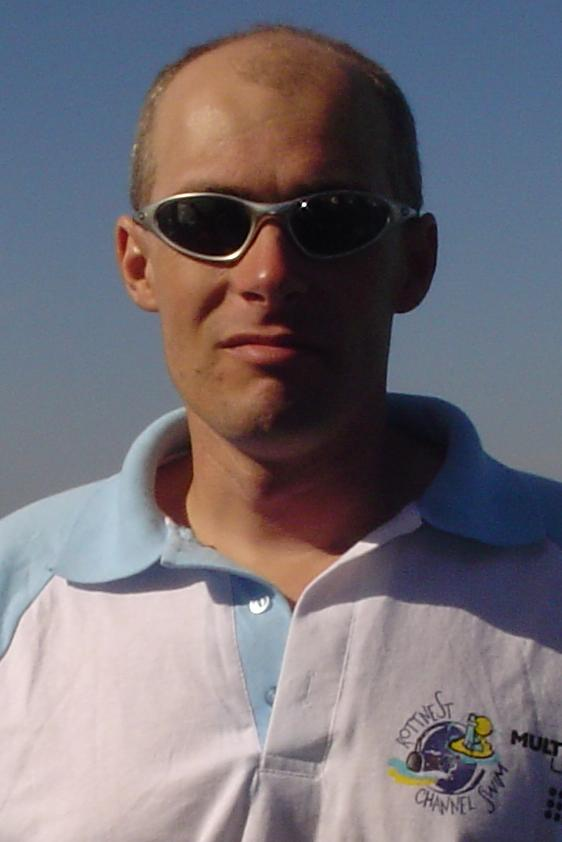
Kingsley Bugarin

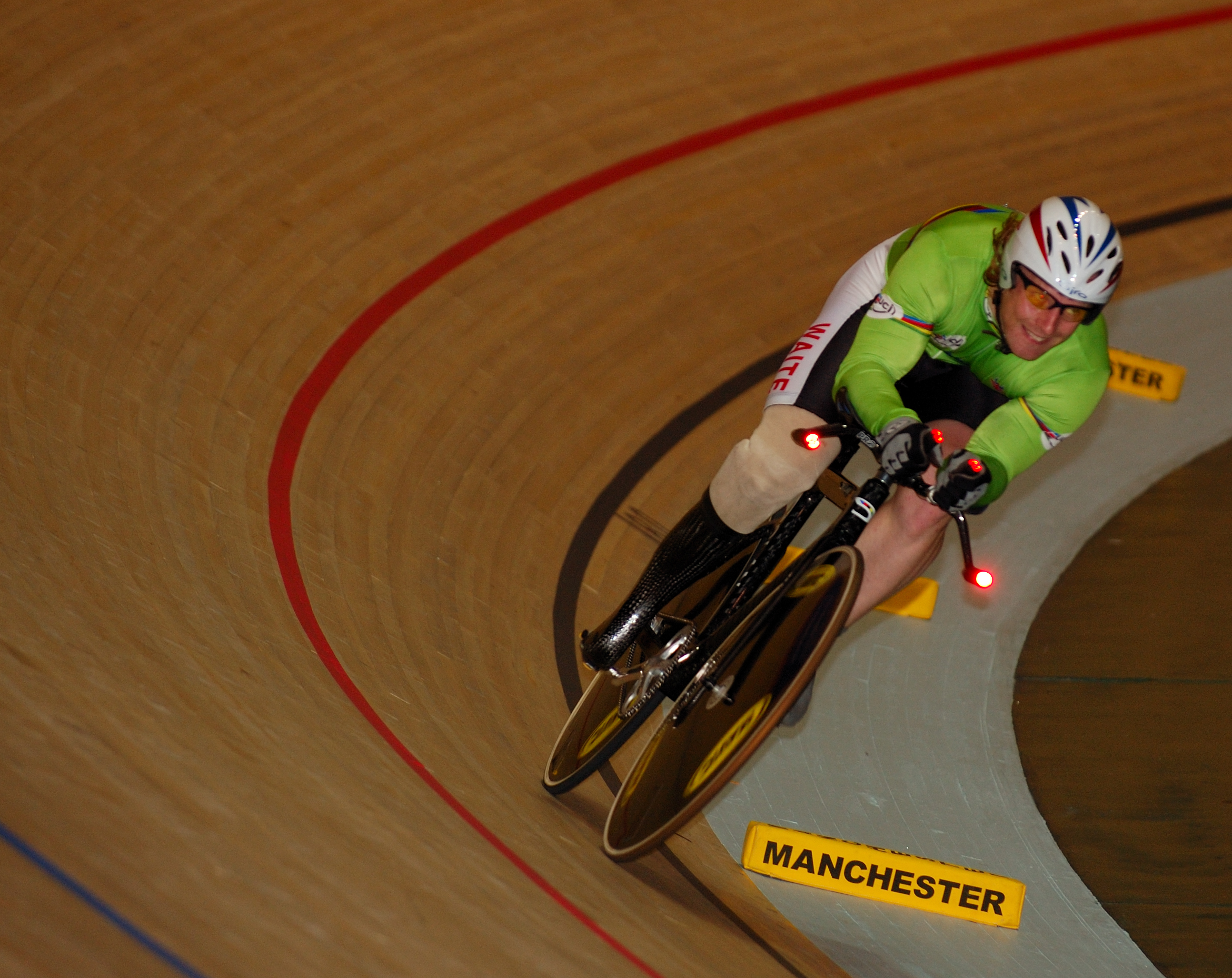
Jody Cundy

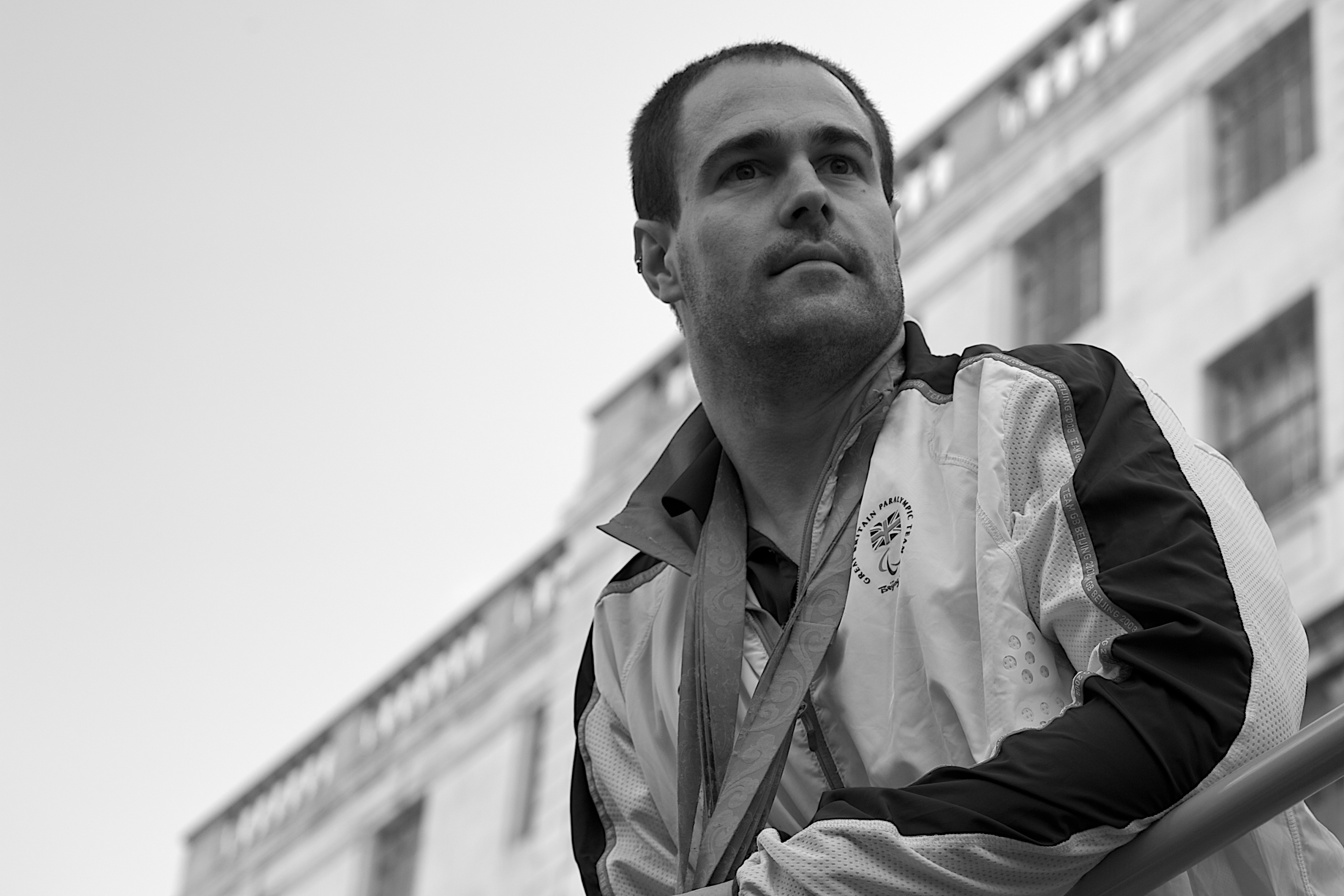
David Roberts

== See also ==
- List of IPC world records in athletics
