= Swimming at the 2020 Summer Paralympics – Women's 50 metre freestyle S11 =

Women's 50 metre freestyle S11 at the XVI Paralympic Games
- Venue: Tokyo Aquatics Centre
- Dates: 29 August 2021
- Competitors: 15 from 9 nations

Medalists
1st place, gold medalist(s)		Ma Jia	China
2nd place, silver medalist(s)		Li Guizhi	China
3rd place, bronze medalist(s)		Karolina Pelendritou	Cyprus

The Women's 50 metre freestyle S11 event at the 2020 Paralympic Games took place on 29 August 2021, at the Tokyo Aquatics Centre.

== Heats ==
The swimmers with the top eight times, regardless of heat, advanced to the final.

Rank	Heat	Lane	Name	Nationality	Time	Notes
1	2	4	Karolina Pelendritou	Cyprus	29.92	Q, WR
2	2	3	Li Guizhi	China	29.95	Q
3	1	5	Ma Jia	China	30.05	Q
4	1	4	Liesette Bruinsma	Netherlands	30.26	Q
5	1	3	Tomomi Ishiura	Japan	31.08	Q
6	1	2	Wang Xinyi	China	31.12	Q
7	2	5	Maryna Piddubna	Ukraine	31.14	Q
8	2	6	Anastasia Pagonis	United States	31.19	Q
9	2	2	Kateryna Tkachuk	Ukraine	31.35	
10	1	6	Anastasiia Shevchenko	RPC	31.85	
11	2	7	Sofiia Polikarpova	RPC	32.36	
12	1	1	Nadia Báez	Argentina	34.11	
13	2	1	Tatiana Blattnerová	Slovakia	34.88	
14	1	7	Chikako Ono	Japan	35.91	
15	2	8	Yana Berezhna	Ukraine	36.59	

== Final ==
50m freestyle final
Rank	Lane	Name	Nationality	Time	Notes
1st place, gold medalist(s)	3	Ma Jia	China	29.20	WR
2nd place, silver medalist(s)	5	Li Guizhi	China	29.72	
3rd place, bronze medalist(s)	4	Karolina Pelendritou	Cyprus	29.79	ER
4	6	Liesette Bruinsma	Netherlands	30.19	
5	7	Wang Xinyi	China	30.24	
6	1	Maryna Piddubna	Ukraine	30.65	
7	2	Tomomi Ishiura	Japan	30.85	
8	8	Anastasia Pagonis	United States	30.91	AR
