= Cyprus at the 2012 Summer Paralympics =

- IPC code: CYP
- NPC: Cyprus National Paralympic Committee
- Website: www.paralympic.org.cy

in London
- Competitors: 3 in 3 sports
- Flag bearer: Karolina Pelentritov
- Medals Ranked 67th: Gold 0 Silver 1 Bronze 0 Total 1

Summer Paralympics appearances (overview)
- 1988; 1992; 1996; 2000; 2004; 2008; 2012; 2016; 2020; 2024

Cyprus competed at the 2012 Summer Paralympics in London, United Kingdom from August 29 to September 9, 2012.

== Medallists ==
Medal	Name	Sport	Event	Date
Silver	Karolina Pelendritou	Swimming	Women's 100m Breaststroke SB12	8 September

== Athletics ==
Men’s Track and Road Events

Athlete	Event	Heat		Final	
Athlete	Event	Result	Rank	Result	Rank
Antonis Aresti	100m T46	11.34	5	did not advance	
Antonis Aresti	200m T46	22.43	1 Q	22.40	4
Antonis Aresti	400m T46	50.30	3 Q	49.59	4

== Shooting ==
Men

Athlete	Event	Qualification		Final	
Athlete	Event	Score	Rank	Score	Rank
Evripides Georgiou	10m Air Pistol SH1	545	25	did not advance	

== Swimming ==
Women

Athletes	Event	Heat		Final	
Athletes	Event	Time	Rank	Time	Rank
Karolina Pelendritou	100m breaststroke SB12	1:19.33	1 Q	1:16.38	2nd place, silver medalist(s)

== See also ==
- Cyprus at the 2012 Summer Olympics
