= Cyprus at the 2020 Summer Paralympics =

Cyprus at the 2016 Summer Paralympics
- IPC code: CYP
- NPC: Cyprus National Paralympic Committee
- Website: www.paralympic.org.cy

in Tokyo
- Competitors: 3 in 3 sports
- Medals: Gold 1 Silver 0 Bronze 1 Total 2

Summer Paralympics appearances (overview)
- 1988; 1992; 1996; 2000; 2004; 2008; 2012; 2016; 2020; 2024

Cyprus competed at the 2020 Summer Paralympics in Tokyo, Japan, from 24 August to 5 September 2021. This was the island country's ninth consecutive appearance in a Summer Paralympiad having made its debut at the 1988 Summer Paralympics.

== Medalists ==
Medal	Name	Sport	Event	Date
Gold	Karolina Pelendritou	Swimming	Women's 100 metre breaststroke SB11	1 September
Bronze	Karolina Pelendritou	Swimming	Women's 50 metre freestyle S11	29 August

== Athletics ==
Athlete	Events	Heat		Final	
Athlete	Events	Time	Rank	Time	Rank
Antonis Aresti	Men's 400m T47	51.97	6	did not advance	

== Powerlifting ==
Name	Event	Attempts (kg)			Rank
Name	Event	1	2	3	Rank
Maria Markou	Women's −67 kg	93	94	99	7

== Swimming ==
One Cypriot female athlete has successfully entered the paralympic slot after breaking the MQS.

Athlete	Event	Heats		Final	
Athlete	Event	Result	Rank	Result	Rank
Karolina Pelendritou	Women's 50m freestyle S11	29.92 WR	1 Q	29.79	3rd place, bronze medalist(s)
Karolina Pelendritou	Women's 100m breastroke SB11	1:24.54	2 Q	1:19.78 WR	1st place, gold medalist(s)
