= Cyprus at the 2008 Summer Paralympics =

- IPC code: CYP
- NPC: Cyprus National Paralympic Committee
- Website: www.paralympic.org.cy

in Beijing
- Competitors: 4 in 3 sports
- Medals Ranked 44th: Gold 1 Silver 2 Bronze 1 Total 4

Summer Paralympics appearances (overview)
- 1988; 1992; 1996; 2000; 2004; 2008; 2012; 2016; 2020; 2024

Cyprus sent a delegation to compete at the 2008 Summer Paralympics in Beijing, People's Republic of China. Its delegation consisted in one track and field athlete (Antonis Aresti), one competitor in shooting (Evripides Georgiou), and two swimmers (Karolina Pelendritou and Andreas Potamitis).

The country won a total of four medals: one gold, two silver and one bronze. This was by far Cyprus' best performance ever at the Paralympics; over the course of its five previous participations, it had won a single medal: a gold in swimming in 2004.

== Medalists ==
Medal	Name	Sport	Event
Gold	Karolina Pelendritou	Swimming	Women's 100m breaststroke SB12
Silver	Antonis Aresti	Athletics	Men's 400m T46
Silver	Antonis Aresti	Athletics	Men's 200m T46
Bronze	Karolina Pelendritou	Swimming	Women's 200m individual medley SM12

== Sports ==
=== Athletics ===
==== Men's track ====
Athlete	Class	Event	Heats		Final	
Athlete	Class	Event	Result	Rank	Result	Rank
Antonis Aresti	T46	200m	22.43	2 Q	22.15	2nd place, silver medalist(s)
Antonis Aresti	T46	400m	49.74	4 Q	48.87	2nd place, silver medalist(s)

=== Shooting ===
Athlete	Event	Qualification		Final		
Athlete	Event	Score	Rank	Score	Total	Rank
Evripides Georgiou	Men's 10m air pistol SH1	560	13	did not advance		

=== Swimming ===
Athlete	Class	Event	Heats		Final	
Athlete	Class	Event	Result	Rank	Result	Rank
Andreas Potamitis	S6	Men's 50m freestyle	34.07	10	did not advance	
Andreas Potamitis	S6	Men's 100m freestyle	DSQ		did not advance	
Karolina Pelendritou	S12	Women's 50m freestyle	29.09	5 Q	28.72	5
Karolina Pelendritou	SB12	Women's 100m breaststroke	1:16.82 WR	1 Q	1:17.58	1st place, gold medalist(s)
Karolina Pelendritou	SM12	Women's 200m individual medley	2:42.65	3 Q	2:35.30	3rd place, bronze medalist(s)

== See also ==
- Cyprus at the Paralympics
- Cyprus at the 2008 Summer Olympics
