= Cyprus at the 2016 Summer Paralympics =

- IPC code: CYP
- NPC: Cyprus National Paralympic Committee
- Website: www.paralympic.org.cy

in Rio de Janeiro
- Competitors: 2 in 2 sports
- Flag bearers: Karolina Pelendritou (opening); Antonis Aresti (closing)
- Medals: Gold 0 Silver 0 Bronze 0 Total 0

Summer Paralympics appearances (overview)
- 1988; 1992; 1996; 2000; 2004; 2008; 2012; 2016; 2020; 2024

Cyprus sent a delegation to compete at the 2016 Summer Paralympics in Rio de Janeiro, Brazil, from 7 to 18 September 2016. This was the island country's eighth consecutive appearance in a Summer Paralympiad having made its debut at the 1988 Summer Paralympics. The Cypriot delegation to Rio de Janeiro consisted of two athletes: sprinter Antonis Aresti and short-distance swimmer Karolina Pelendritou. Aresti placed sixth overall in the men's 400 metres T47 event and Pelendritou came fourth in the 100 metres breaststroke SB13 competition after losing the bronze medal by 20 cm (7.9 in) in the final.

== Background ==
Cyprus' debut in Paralympic competition was the 1988 Seoul Summer Paralympics. The island country has entered every Summer Paralympic Games since, making Rio de Janeiro their eighth appearance at a Summer Paralympiad. At the close of the Rio Games, the nation had won a total of six medals in their history in the Paralympic movement. The 2016 Summer Paralympics were held from 7–18 September 2016 with a total of 4,328 athletes representing 159 National Paralympic Committees taking part. Two athletes were sent by Cyprus to Rio de Janeiro: sprinter Antonis Aresti and short-distance swimmer Karolina Pelendritou. They were accompanied by the team's chef de mission Aristides Evripides, the president of the Cyprus National Paralympic Committee Andreas Kamarliggos, coaches Christos Constantinou and Stylianos Kakavogiannis, a team doctor and a trainer-physiotherapist. Pelendritou was chosen to be the flag bearer for the parade of nations at the opening ceremony and Aresti performed these duties at the closing ceremony.

== Disability classifications ==
Every participant at the Paralympics has their disability grouped into one of five disability categories; amputation, the condition may be congenital or sustained through injury or illness; cerebral palsy; wheelchair athletes, there is often overlap between this and other categories; visual impairment, including blindness; Les autres, any physical disability that does not fall strictly under one of the other categories, for example dwarfism or multiple sclerosis. Each Paralympic sport then has its own classifications, dependent upon the specific physical demands of competition. Events are given a code, made of numbers and letters, describing the type of event and classification of the athletes competing. Some sports, such as athletics, divide athletes by both the category and severity of their disabilities, other sports, for example swimming, group competitors from different categories together, the only separation being based on the severity of the disability.

== Athletics ==
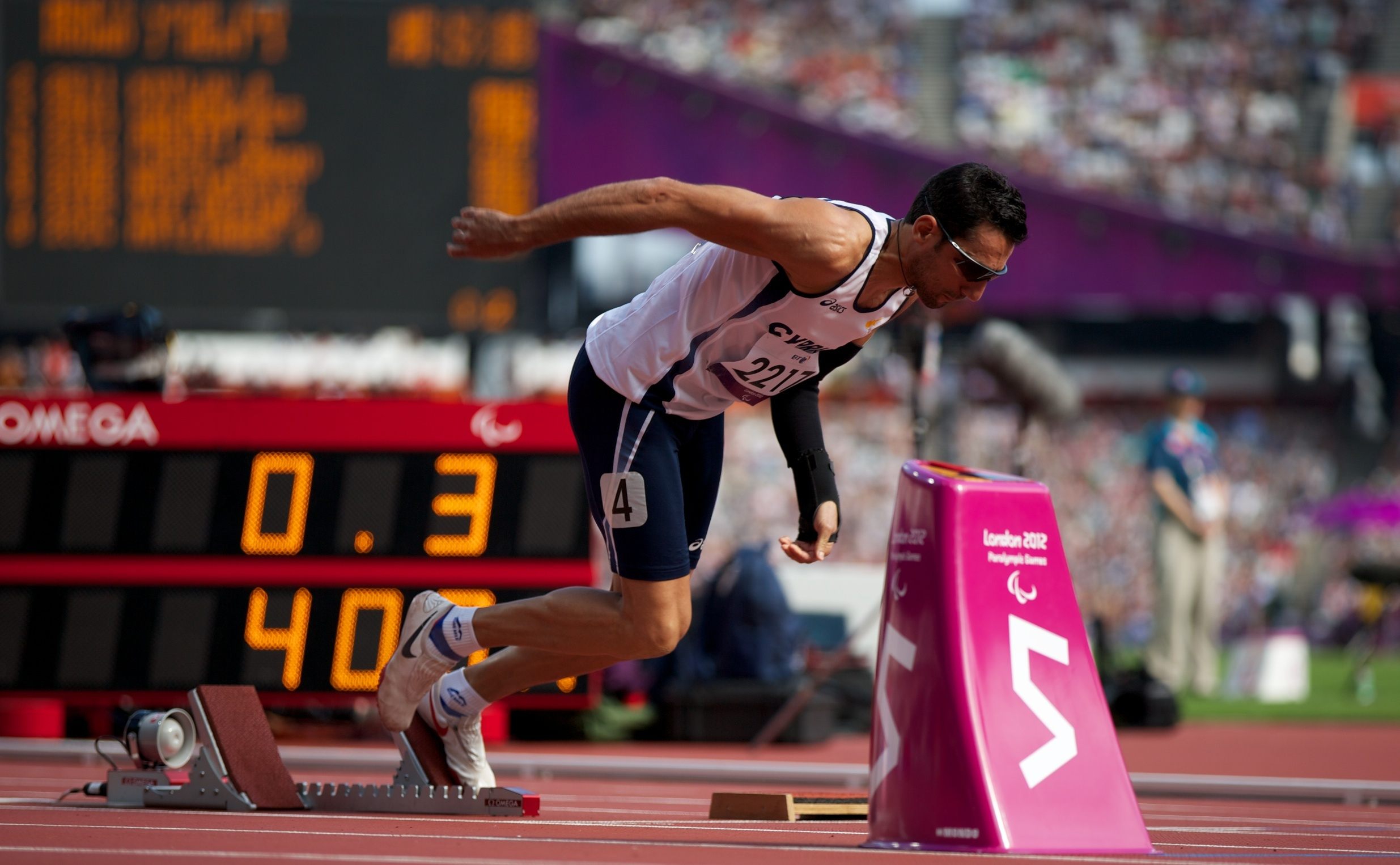
Antonis Aresti (pictured at the 2012 Summer Paralympics) represented Cyprus for the third time in his Paralympic career in athletics.

Antonis Aresti was born on 15 February 1983. At the age of three, he lost the full use of his left arm when he was struck by a car while crossing the road in Cyprus and was left with three severed nerves. This led Aresti to take up sprinting and made his international debut at the 2006 Dutch World Track and Field Championship. These Rio Paralympics were his third consecutive appearance in the Paralympic movement after representing Cyprus at the 2008 Summer Paralympics (two silver medals) and the 2012 London Paralympics. Aresti is classified as T47. He qualified for the Games since his 2015 IPC Athletics World Championships performance of 50.55 seconds in the men's 400 metres T47 was 0.25 seconds faster than the "A" qualifying standard for that discipline. Aresti stated to the Cyprus News Agency that his goal was to reach the final of his event and then win another Paralympic medal. On 16 September, he competed in the heats of the men's 400 metres T47 event. Aresti was drawn into heat one, finishing in a time of 50.42 seconds, third out of eight athletes. His time was eighth fastest overall and this allowed him to proceed to the next day's final. (Note: Three athletes were disqualified in the heats.) There, Aresti finished in sixth position out of eight sprinters in a time of 50.07 seconds.

Men's Track

Athlete	Events	Heat		Final	
Athlete	Events	Time	Rank	Time	Rank
Antonis Aresti	400 m T45-47	50.42	3 Q	50.07	6

== Swimming ==
Born on 25 August 1986, Karolina Pelendritou has lost 97 per cent of her central vision in her retina, rendering her unable to see details from a long distance. She is classified as SB12 but the International Paralympic Committee and the Rio 2016 Organising Committee for the Olympic and Paralympic Games assigned her to compete in the SB13 category because there were no other swimmers in her classification who qualified for the Games. Pelendritou was competing in the Summer Paralympic Games for the fourth time in her career, having represented Cyprus at the previous three Summer Paralympics. She said before the Games, "First of all I do not know in advance whether the upcoming Paralympic Games of my career will be equally important as the three previous ones. In Athens, Beijing and London I climbed the podium. Now; I want it, I believe, I expect it." Pelendritou took part in the heats of the women's 100 metre breaststroke SB13 on 11 September, where she was assigned heat one, which she finished in one minute and 20.72 seconds, in sixth place out of eight swimmers overall, advancing her to the final. In the final, she overtook two competitors in the second half of the race, but lost the bronze medal to Colleen Young of the United States by around 20 cm (7.9 in) and two-hundredths of a second to finish fourth with a new personal best Paralympic time of one minute and 17.22 seconds.

Women

Athlete	Events	Heats		Final	
Athlete	Events	Time	Rank	Time	Rank
Karolina Pelendritou	100 m breaststroke SB13	1:20.72	6 Q	1:17.22	4

== See also ==
- Cyprus at the 2016 Summer Olympics
