= Swimming at the 2020 Summer Paralympics – Women's 400 metre freestyle S11 =

Women's 400 metre freestyle S11 at the XVI Paralympic Games
- Venue: Tokyo Aquatics Centre
- Dates: 26 August 2021
- Competitors: 10 from 8 nations

Medalists
| 1st place, gold medalist(s) | | Anastasia Pagonis | United States |
| 2nd place, silver medalist(s) | | Liesette Bruinsma | Netherlands |
| 3rd place, bronze medalist(s) | | Cai Liwen | China |

The Women's 400 metre freestyle S11 event at the 2020 Paralympic Games took place on 26 August 2021, at the Tokyo Aquatics Centre.

== Heats ==
The swimmers with the top 8 times, regardless of heat, advanced to the final.

| Rank | Heat | Lane | Name | Nationality | Time | Notes |
|---|---|---|---|---|---|---|
| 1 | 2 | 4 | Anastasia Pagonis | United States | 4:58.40 | Q, WR |
| 2 | 1 | 4 | Liesette Bruinsma | Netherlands | 5:10.33 | Q |
| 3 | 2 | 5 | Cai Liwen | China | 5:25.00 | Q |
| 4 | 1 | 5 | Matilde Alcázar | Mexico | 5:26.58 | Q |
| 5 | 1 | 3 | Wang Xinyi | China | 5:32.06 | Q |
| 6 | 2 | 2 | Anastasiia Shevchenko | RPC | 5:37.04 | Q |
| 7 | 2 | 3 | McClain Hermes | United States | 5:38.56 | Q |
| 8 | 1 | 6 | Martina Rabbolini | Italy | 5:47.78 | Q |
| 9 | 2 | 6 | Tatiana Blattnerová | Slovakia | 5:49.16 | |
| | 1 | 2 | Nadia Báez | Argentina | DSQ | |

== Final ==
400m freestyle final
| Rank | Lane | Name | Nationality | Time | Notes |
|---|---|---|---|---|---|
| 1st place, gold medalist(s) | 4 | Anastasia Pagonis | United States | 4:54.49 | WR |
| 2nd place, silver medalist(s) | 5 | Liesette Bruinsma | Netherlands | 5:05.34 | |
| 3rd place, bronze medalist(s) | 3 | Cai Liwen | China | 5:07.56 | |
| 4 | 2 | Wang Xinyi | China | 5:23.05 | |
| 5 | 6 | Matilde Alcázar | Mexico | 5:24.63 | |
| 6 | 1 | McClain Hermes | United States | 5:29.34 | |
| 7 | 7 | Anastasiia Shevchenko | RPC | 5:29.34 | |
| 8 | 8 | Martina Rabbolini | Italy | 5:47.25 | |
