= Swimming at the 2020 Summer Paralympics – Women's 200 metre individual medley SM11 =

Women's 200 metre individual medley SM11 at the XVI Paralympic Games
- Venue: Tokyo Aquatics Centre
- Dates: 30 August 2021
- Competitors: 13 from 8 nations

Medalists
1st place, gold medalist(s)		Ma Jia	China
2nd place, silver medalist(s)		Cai Liwen	China
3rd place, bronze medalist(s)		Anastasia Pagonis	United States

The Women's 200 metre individual medley SM11 event at the 2020 Paralympic Games took place on 30 August 2021, at the Tokyo Aquatics Centre.

== Heats ==
The swimmers with the top eight times, regardless of heat, advanced to the final.

Rank	Heat	Lane	Name	Nationality	Time	Notes
1	1	4	Ma Jia	China	2:47.48	Q
2	2	5	Anastasia Pagonis	United States	2:48.45	Q
3	2	3	Cai Liwen	China	2:50.28	Q
4	2	4	Liesette Bruinsma	Netherlands	2:50.70	Q
5	1	3	Wang Xinyi	China	2:53.15	Q
6	2	7	Anastasiia Shevchenko	RPC	3:00.29	Q
7	1	5	Maryna Piddubna	Ukraine	3:01.80	Q
8	2	2	Martina Rabbolini	Italy	3:02.85	Q
9	1	6	Matilde Alcázar	Mexico	3:03.28	
10	1	2	Kateryna Tkachuk	Ukraine	3:05.55	
11	2	6	Yana Berezhna	Ukraine	3:11.13	
12	2	1	Nadia Báez	Argentina	3:22.90	
13	1	7	McClain Hermes	United States	3:26.81	

== Final ==
200m individual medley final
Rank	Lane	Name	Nationality	Time	Notes
1st place, gold medalist(s)	4	Ma Jia	China	2:42:14	WR
2nd place, silver medalist(s)	3	Cai Liwen	China	2:42:91	
3rd place, bronze medalist(s)	5	Anastasia Pagonis	United States	2:45:61	AR
4	2	Wang Xinyi	China	2:45:74	
5	6	Liesette Bruinsma	Netherlands	2:50:78	
6	7	Anastasiia Shevchenko	RPC	3:00:13	
7	1	Maryna Piddubna	Ukraine	3:01:53	
8	8	Martina Rabbolini	Italy	3:03:07	
