= Cyprus at the 2024 Summer Paralympics =

- Flag of Cyprus
- IPC code: CYP
- NPC: Cyprus National Paralympic Committee

in Paris, France August 28, 2024 – September 8, 2024
- Competitors: 3 (1 man and 2 women) in 3 sports
- Flag bearer: Karolina Pelendritou
- Medals Ranked 73rd: Gold 0 Silver 1 Bronze 1 Total 2

Summer Paralympics appearances (overview)
- 1988; 1992; 1996; 2000; 2004; 2008; 2012; 2016; 2020; 2024

Cyprus competed at the 2024 Summer Paralympics in Paris, France, from 28 August to 8 September 2024.

== Medallist ==
Medal	Athlete/s	Sport	Event	Date
Silver	Karolina Pelendritou	Swimming	Women's 50 metre freestyle S11	31 August
Bronze	Karolina Pelendritou	Swimming	Women's 100 metre breaststroke SB11	5 September

== Competitors ==
The following is the list of number of competitors in the Games.

Sport	Men	Women	Total
Athletics	1	0	1
Powerlifting	0	1	1
Swimming	0	1	1
Total	1	2	3

== Athletics ==
Key

- Note–Ranks given for track events are within the athlete's heat only
- Q = Qualified for the next round
- q = Qualified for the next round as a fastest loser or, in field events, by position without achieving the qualifying target
- DQ = Disqualified
- PR = Paralympic Record
- AR = Area (or continental) Record
- NR = National Record
- SB = Season's Best
- N/A = Round not applicable for the event
- Bye = Athlete not required to compete in round

Field Events
Men

Athlete	Event	Final	
Athlete	Event	Result	Rank
Viktoras Pentaras	Men's long jump T37	5.88	7

== Powerlifting ==
Athlete	Event	Attempts (kg)				Result (kg)	Rank
Athlete	Event	1	2	3	4	Result (kg)	Rank
Maria Markou	Women's 61 kg	95	~~100~~	~~102~~		95	9

== Swimming ==
Women

Athlete	Event	Heats		Final	
Athlete	Event	Result	Rank	Result	Rank
Karolina Pelendritou	Women's 50 m freestyle S11	29.92	1 Q	29.82	2nd place, silver medalist(s)
Karolina Pelendritou	Women's 100 metre breaststroke SB11	1:25.29	1 Q	1:21.64	3rd place, bronze medalist(s)

== See also ==
- Cyprus at the 2024 Summer Olympics
- Cyprus at the Paralympics
