= Cyprus at the 2004 Summer Paralympics =

- IPC code: CYP
- NPC: Cyprus National Paralympic Committee
- Website: www.paralympic.org.cy

in Athens
- Competitors: 5 in 3 sports
- Medals Ranked 57th: Gold 1 Silver 0 Bronze 0 Total 1

Summer Paralympics appearances (overview)
- 1988; 1992; 1996; 2000; 2004; 2008; 2012; 2016; 2020; 2024

Cyprus competed at the 2004 Summer Paralympics in Athens, Greece. The team included 5 athletes, 2 men and 3 women. Competitors from Cyprus won one gold medal to finish 57th in the medal table.

== Medalists ==
Medal	Name	Sport	Event
Gold	Karolina Pelendritou	Swimming	Women's 100 m breaststroke SB13

== Sports ==
=== Archery ===
Athlete	Event	Ranking round		Round of 32	Round of 16	Quarterfinals	Semifinals	Finals	
Athlete	Event	Score	Seed	Opposition score	Opposition score	Opposition score	Opposition score	Opposition score	Rank
Georgia Giagkoulla	Women's individual W1/W2	426	15	—	Ko (KOR); L 99-156	did not advance			

=== Athletics ===
Athlete	Class	Event	Heats		Semifinal		Final	
Athlete	Class	Event	Result	Rank	Result	Rank	Result	Rank
Yiannakis Gavriel	T54	Marathon	—				2:18:22	30

=== Swimming ===
==== Men ====
Athlete	Class	Event	Heats		Final	
Athlete	Class	Event	Result	Rank	Result	Rank
Andreas Potamitis	S6	50m freestyle	33.72	8 Q	33.41	7

==== Women ====
Athlete	Class	Event	Heats		Final	
Athlete	Class	Event	Result	Rank	Result	Rank
Karolina Pelendritou	S13	50m freestyle	30.33	7 Q	30.29	8
Karolina Pelendritou	S13	100m freestyle	1:06.66	8 Q	1:07.00	8
Karolina Pelendritou	S13	100m backstroke	DSQ		did not advance	
Karolina Pelendritou	SB13	100m breaststroke	—		1:17.32 PR	1st place, gold medalist(s)
Mikaella Spantiou	S12	50m freestyle	32.92	12	did not advance	
Mikaella Spantiou	S12	100m backstroke	—		DNF	

== See also ==
- Cyprus at the Paralympics
- Cyprus at the 2004 Summer Olympics
