= Cyprus at the 1988 Summer Paralympics =

- IPC code: CYP
- NPC: Cyprus National Paralympic Committee
- Website: www.paralympic.org.cy

in Seoul
- Competitors: 6
- Medals: Gold 0 Silver 0 Bronze 0 Total 0

Summer Paralympics appearances (overview)
- 1988; 1992; 1996; 2000; 2004; 2008; 2012; 2016; 2020; 2024

Cyprus competed at the 1988 Summer Paralympics in Seoul, South Korea. 6 competitors from Cyprus won no medals and so did not place in the medal table.

== See also ==
- Cyprus at the Paralympics
- Cyprus at the 1988 Summer Olympics
