= Swimming at the 2016 Summer Paralympics – Qualification =

For the swimming competitions at the 2016 Summer Paralympics, the following qualification systems are in place. Qualification ends on July 3, 2016.

== Allocation of Qualification Slots ==
An NPC can be allocated a maximum of thirty-four male qualification slots and a maximum of twenty-eight female qualification slots for a maximum total of sixty-two qualification slots per NPC. Exceptions may be granted through the Bipartite Invitation Commission Allocation method.

The qualification slot is allocated to the NPC not to the individual athlete. In case of a Bipartite Commission Invitation the slot is allocated to the individual athlete not to the NPC.

To ensure all medal events on the program are viable at the Rio 2016 Paralympic Games IPC Swimming reserves the right to allocate slots to the exclusive use of certain sport classes, in particular for athletes with high support needs. The slot shall be used as allocated or the NPC must return the slot.

An NPC can enter a maximum of three eligible athletes per medal event. NPCs can enter their athletes who have met at least one minimum qualification standard (MQS) in an unlimited number of further medal events as long as they have met the Minimum Entry Time (MET) for each of these additional events.

NPCs can enter a maximum of one team in each relay event as long as the MQS for the relay has been met. All team members must have qualified in at least one individual event to be selected as part of the relay-team.

== Qualification system ==
Qualification slots will be allocated as follows:

Swimming at the 2016 Summer Paralympics – Qualification System
METHOD	QUALIFICATION	TOTAL
2015 World Championships Allocation 2015 IPC Swimming World Championships Glasgow, Great Britain	The top two (2) ranked athletes at the 2015 IPC Swimming World Championships in each of the Individual medal events on the Rio 2016 Paralympic Programme will each obtain one (1) qualification slot for their respective NPC. In the case that an athlete is ranked first or second in more than one medal event, he/she can only obtain one qualification slot for his/her NPC.	150 male athletes 100 female athletes
MQS Qualification Allocation 15 October 2014 - 31 January 2016.	Athletes who achieved an MQS performance at an IPC Recognised Competition between 15 October 2014 and 31 January 2016 but who did not obtain a direct allocation slot at the 2015 World Championships for their respective NPC will be considered to determine the NPC's MQS Qualification Allocation slots. If more athletes have achieved an MQS than the total number of qualification slots available under this method, then the qualification slots will be allocated as below. The ranking of the athlete on the IPC Swimming World Ranking List closing 31 January 2016 will be taken into account (weighted) to determine the final number of slots allocated to each NPC: Rank 1-8 equals 1; Rank 9-12 equals 0.8; Rank 13-16 equals 0.6; Rank above 16 equals 0.5; Male: A x (B ÷ C) = NPC Allocation: A: NPC's total number of male athletes with an MQS (based on the weight of their rank) who have not obtained a slot at World Championships; B: Total number of available male qualification slots; C: Total number of male athletes with an MQS (based on the weight of their rank) who have not obtained a slot at World Championships; Female: D x (E ÷ F) = NPC Allocation: D: NPC's total number of female athletes with an MQS (based on the weight of their rank) who have not obtained a slot at World Championships; E: Total number of available female qualification slots; F: Total number of female athletes with an MQS (based on the weight of their rank) who have not obtained a slot at World Championships.	185 male athletes 175 female athletes
Bipartite Commission Invitation Allocation	Any qualification slot not allocated under this method will be distributed through the Bipartite Commission Invitation Allocation method. Five eligible male athletes and five eligible female athletes will be considered by the IPC and IPC Swimming for Bipartite Commission Invitation qualification slots.	5 male athletes 5 female athletes
Total		620; 340 male athletes 280 female athletes

== Quotas achieved ==
The following Quota Places have been gained at the time of writing (September 2015) through performances at the 2015 IPC Swimming World Championships.

Swimming at the 2016 Summer Paralympics - Quota Places achieved
NPC	IPC Worlds 2015	MQS Quota	Total
Ukraine	26		26
Russia	25		25
China	12		12
Great Britain	11		11
United States	9		9
Australia	7		7
Brazil	7		7
Netherlands	7		7
Spain	7		7
Italy	5		5
New Zealand	5		5
Japan	4		4
Canada	3		3
Germany	3		3
Mexico	3		3
Azerbaijan	2		2
Belarus	2		2
Colombia	2		2
France	2		2
Norway	2		2
South Korea	2		2
Sweden	2		2
Cyprus	1		1
Czech Republic	1		1
Thailand	1		1
Greece	1		1
Iceland	1		1
Iran	1		1
Poland	1		1
South Africa	1		1
Vietnam	1		1
Total	157		157
