= Cyprus at the 1996 Summer Paralympics =

- IPC code: CYP
- NPC: Cyprus National Paralympic Committee
- Website: www.paralympic.org.cy

in Atlanta
- Competitors: 4 (4 men) in 2 sports and 6 events
- Medals: Gold 0 Silver 0 Bronze 0 Total 0

Summer Paralympics appearances (overview)
- 1988; 1992; 1996; 2000; 2004; 2008; 2012; 2016; 2020; 2024

Four male athletes from Cyprus competed at the 1996 Summer Paralympics in Atlanta, United States.

== See also ==
- Cyprus at the Paralympics
- Cyprus at the 1996 Summer Olympics
