= Swimming at the 2016 Summer Paralympics – Women's 100 metre breaststroke SB13 =

Women's 100 metre breaststroke SB13 at the XV Paralympic Games
- Venue: Olympic Aquatics Stadium
- Dates: 11 September 2016
- Competitors: 15 from 11 nations

Medalists
1st place, gold medalist(s)		Fotimakhon Amilova	Uzbekistan
2nd place, silver medalist(s)		Rebecca Redfern	Great Britain
3rd place, bronze medalist(s)		Colleen Young	United States

The women's 100 metre breaststroke SB13 event at the 2016 Paralympic Games took place on 11 September 2016, at the Olympic Aquatics Stadium. Two heats were held. The swimmers with the eight fastest times advanced to the final.

== Heats ==
=== Heat 1 ===
10:22 11 September 2016:

Rank	Lane	Name	Nationality	Time	Notes
1	4	Elena Krawzow	Germany	1:17.25	PR Q
2	6	Anastasiya Zudzilava	Belarus	1:20.01	Q
3	3	Prue Watt	Australia	1:20.44	Q
4	5	Karolina Pelendritou	Cyprus	1:20.72	Q
5	2	Jenna Jones	Australia	1:22.25	
6	7	Raquel Viel	Brazil	1:26.51	
7	1	Carla de Bortoli	Switzerland	1:29.05	

=== Heat 2 ===
10:26 11 September 2016:

Rank	Lane	Name	Nationality	Time	Notes
1	4	Rebecca Redfern	Great Britain	1:17.08	PR Q
2	5	Colleen Young	United States	1:19.10	Q
3	6	Fotimakhon Amilova	Uzbekistan	1:21.20	Q
4	2	Martha Ruether	United States	1:21.74	Q
5	3	Emely Telle	Germany	1:21.78	
6	7	Marian Polo Lopez	Spain	1:24.67	
7	1	Alani Ferreira	South Africa	1:27.52	
8	8	McClain Hermes	United States	1:35.11	

== Final ==
18:08 11 September 2016:

Rank	Lane	Name	Nationality	Time	Notes
1st place, gold medalist(s)	1	Fotimakhon Amilova	Uzbekistan	1:12.45	WR
2nd place, silver medalist(s)	4	Rebecca Redfern	Great Britain	1:13.81	
3rd place, bronze medalist(s)	3	Colleen Young	United States	1:17.02	
4	7	Karolina Pelendritou	Cyprus	1:17.22	
5	5	Elena Krawzow	Germany	1:17.46	
6	2	Prue Watt	Australia	1:18.16	
7	6	Anastasiya Zudzilava	Belarus	1:19.79	
8	8	Martha Ruether	United States	1:20.48	
