= Cancer associated retinopathy =

Autoimmune eye disease

Cancer Associated Retinopathy
- Specialty: Ophthalmology, optometry
- Complications: Blindness
- Diagnostic method: Eye examination
- Differential diagnosis: Retinitis pigmentosa
- Treatment: Immunosuppression

Cancer Associated Retinopathy (CAR) also known as Carcinoma Associated Retinopathy is an immune-mediated disease affecting the retina of the eye. It is a paraneoplastic type autoimmune retinopathy associated with cancer that can cause blindness. It can be seen in association with various types of cancers. It can be treated with a combination of chemotherapy and immunosuppression.

== Signs and symptoms ==
Patients may complain loss of vision, black spots in the field of vision (scotoma), night blindness, prolonged glare after light exposure, prolonged dark adaptation and defects in colour vision (dyschromatopsia). Major signs include circulating anti-retinal antibodies along with loss of the outer retinal layer including the ellipsoid layer and photoreceptor cells, abnormalities in ERG, fundus autofluorescence and visual field defectss.

== Pathophysiology ==
It is a paraneoplastic type of autoimmune retinopathy. It may be seen in association with various cancers including non-small cell lung cancer, breast cancer, gynacological cancers, tumors of the hematopoietic and lymphoid tissues, basal cell carcinoma, colon cancer, kidney cancer, prostate cancer and pancreatic cancer.

CAR results from the interaction between retinal antigen expression in cancer tissues and their systemic immune response. These antigens trigger an autoimmune response within the host to form antibodies that cross-react with the retinal antigen. This ultimately leads to retinal degeneration and apoptosis. Recoverin is the most common antigen associated with CAR.

== Diagnosis ==
CAR is suspected in cancer patients who present with unexplained visual loss, scotomas and an abnormal ERG. Antiretinal antibodies can be detected using Western blot test, immunohistochemistry test or ELISA testing. But the diagnosis is challenging as the signs and symptoms overlaps with many other diseases affecting the retina.

== Treatment ==
Long-term systemic Immunosuppressive therapy is the main treatment of cancer-associated retinopathy. It can be treated with a combination of chemotherapy and immunosuppression. Although tumor removal and cancer regression may result in a decrease in circulating autoantibodies, this does not influence CAR progression.

Systematic immunosuppressive medications used in the treatment include corticosteroids, cyclosporin, azathioprine and alemtuzumab. Intravenous immunoglobulin injections have several advantages including neutralization of autoantibodies. Various monoclonal antibodies are also used to treat CAR.

== Prevalence ==
The prevalence of CAR among cancer patients is thought to be 10%–15%.

== History ==
In 1976, cancer-related vision loss and photoreceptor dysfunction were first described by Sawyer et al.
