= Athletics at the 2008 Summer Paralympics – Men's 200 metres T46 =

The Men's 200m T46 had its first round held on September 8 at 9:15 and the Final on September 9 at 18:16.

== Medalists ==
Gold	Heath Francis; Australia
Silver	Antonis Aresti; Cyprus
Bronze	Ettiam Calderon; Cuba

== Results ==
Place	Athlete	Class	Round 1	Final
1	Heath Francis (AUS)	T46	22.13 Q	21.74 WR
2	Antonis Aresti (CYP)	T46	22.43 Q	22.15
3	Ettiam Calderon (CUB)	T46	22.78 Q	22.42
4	Yury Nosulenko (RUS)	T45	22.72 Q	22.48
5	Yohansson Nascimento (BRA)	T46	22.92 q	22.53
6	Arnaud Assoumani (FRA)	T46	22.81 Q	22.56
7	Guenther Matzinger (AUT)	T46	23.27 q	23.12
8	Elliot Mujaji (ZIM)	T46	23.23 Q	50.75
9	Francis Kompaon (PNG)	T46	23.30	
10	Willy Martinez (VEN)	T46	23.35	
11	Serge Ornem (FRA)	T46	23.36	
12	Tomoki Tagawa (JPN)	T46	23.38	
13	Domingos Sebastiao (ANG)	T46	23.48	
14	Saeed Alkhaldi (KSA)	T46	23.50	
15	David Roos (RSA)	T46	23.54	
16	Fethi Saidi (TUN)	T46	23.59	
17	Xu Zhao (CHN)	T45	23.67	
18	Samuele Gobbi (ITA)	T46	23.70	
19	Shantha Sirimana Arachchillage (SRI)	T46	23.86	
20	Rubeng Gomez (VEN)	T46	24.23	
21	Claudemir Santos (BRA)	T46	1:09.60	
	Antonio Souza (BRA)	T46	DNS	
	Ahmed Lailli Barry (GUI)	T46	DNS	
