= 2023 World Para Swimming Championships – Women's 50 metre freestyle =

The women's 50m freestyle events at the 2023 World Para Swimming Championships were held at the Manchester Aquatics Centre between 31 July and 6 August. Events were held in eleven classifications.

== Medalists ==
Event	Gold	Silver	Bronze
S3	Marta Fernández Infante; Spain	Ellie Challis; Great Britain	Susana Schnarndorf; Brazil
S4	Tanja Scholz; Germany	Patricia Pereira dos Santos; Brazil	Rachael Watson; Australia
S5	Suzanna Hext; Great Britain	Iryna Poida; Ukraine	Lu Dong; China
S6	Anna Hontar; Ukraine	Jiang Yuyan; China	Shelby Newkirk; Canada
S7	Sara Vargas Blanco; Colombia	Danielle Dorris; Canada	Sabine Weber-Treiber; Austria
S8	Cecília Jerônimo de Araújo; Brazil	Alice Tai; Great Britain	Jiang Shengnan; China
S9	Mariana Ribeiro; Brazil	Alexa Leary; Australia	Florianne Bultje; Netherlands
S10	Aurelie Rivard; Canada	Alessia Scortechini; Italy	Emeline Pierre; France
S11	Ma Jia; China	Liesette Bruinsma; Netherlands	Karolina Pelendritou; Cyprus
S12	Maria Carolina Gomes Santiago; Brazil	Anna Stetsenko; Ukraine	Alessia Berra; Italy
S13	Katja Dedekind; Australia	Carlotta Gilli; Italy	Olivia Chambers; United States

== Results ==
=== S3 ===
12 swimmers took part in this event, with both the heats and final on 4 August. Swimmers in S1 and S2 classes were eligible in this event.

The applicable records going into this event were as follows:

S1
World record	Ingrid Thunem	(Norway)	51.33
Championship record	Danielle Watts	(United Kingdom)	1:21.27
S2
World record	Ingrid Thunem	(Norway)	53.94
Championship record	Yip Pin Xiu	(Singapore)	1:03.77
S3
World record	Leanne Smith	(United States)	40.32
Championship record	Leanne Smith	(United States)	40.32

Heats

Rank	Heat	Lane	Name	Nation	Result	Notes
1	1	4	Marta Fernandez Infante	Spain	43.54	Q
2	2	5	Ellie Challis	Great Britain	49.36	Q
3	1	5	Susana Schnarndorf	Brazil	54.56	Q
4	2	3	Patricia Valle	Mexico	1:01.94	Q
5	2	4	Leanne Smith	United States	1:04.79	Q
6	1	3	Maiara Barreto	Brazil	1:05.59	Q
7	2	6	Sonja Sigurðardóttir	Iceland	1:07.82	Q
8	1	6	Nikita Ens	Canada	1:14.94	Q
9	2	2	Elif Ildem	Turkey	1:35.44	
10	1	2	Konul Suleymanova	Azerbaijan	1:57.72	
11	1	7	Lova Johansson	Sweden	2:01.41	
12	2	7	Eva Hazizi	Greece	2:01.80	

Final

Rank	Lane	Name	Nation	Result	Notes
1st place, gold medalist(s)	4	Marta Fernandez Infante	Spain	42.51	
2nd place, silver medalist(s)	5	Ellie Challis	Great Britain	47.83	
3rd place, bronze medalist(s)	3	Susana Schnarndorf	Brazil	55.52	
4	6	Patricia Valle	Mexico	58.64	
5	7	Maiara Barreto	Brazil	1:02.11	
6	2	Leanne Smith	United States	1:02.37	
7	1	Sonja Sigurðardóttir	Iceland	1:07.75	
8	8	Nikita Ens	Canada	1:17.08	

=== S4 ===
8 swimmers took part in the event, which progressed straight to final. The event took place on 4 August.

Record	Swimmer	Nation	Time
World record	Tanja Scholz	Germany	36.92
Championship record	Tanja Scholz	Germany	38.09

Final

Rank	Lane	Swimmer	Nation	Time
1st place, gold medalist(s)	4	Tanja Scholz	Germany	38.90
2nd place, silver medalist(s)	6	Pereira Dos Santos	Brazil	40.34
3rd place, bronze medalist(s)	5	Rachael Watson	Australia	40.59
4	3	Lidia Vieira Da Cruz	Brazil	40.61
5	7	Gina Boettcher	Germany	42.95
6	2	Nely Miranda	Mexico	44.01
7	1	Kat Swanepoel	South Africa	44.65
8	8	Alexandra Stamatopoulou	Greece	48.34

=== S5 ===
15 swimmers took part in this event, with both the heats and final on Monday 31 July.

WR : Tully Kearney (United Kingdom) : 34.07

Heats

Rank	Heat	Lane	Name	Nation	Result	Notes
1	1	6	Iryna Poida	Ukraine	36.78	Q
2	2	4	Suzanna Hext	Great Britain	37.68	Q
3	2	5	Martinez Guerrero	Colombia	38.05	Q
4	2	1	Dong Lu	China	38.66	Q
5	1	4	Monica Boggioni	Italy	38.82	Q
6	1	7	Shenggao He	China	40.52	Q
7	2	6	Cuan Yao	China	40.77	Q
8	1	2	Agata Koupilova	Czech Republic	41.45	Q
9	1	5	Sumeyye Boyaci	Turkey	43.48	
10	1	3	Angel Mae Otom	Philippines	44.52	
11	2	2	Elizabeth Noriega	Argentina	44.67	
12	2	7	Esthefany Rodrigues	Brazil	45.07	
13	2	8	Maria Fanouria Tziveleki	Greece	45.55	
14	1	1	Jessica Tinney	Canada	47.68	
-	2	3	Sevilay Ozturk	Turkey	DSQ	

Final

Rank	Lane	Athlete	Nation	Result	Notes
1st place, gold medalist(s)	5	Suzanna Hext	Great Britain	36.71	
2nd place, silver medalist(s)	4	Iryna Poida	Ukraine	36.73	
3rd place, bronze medalist(s)	6	Dong Lu	China	37.36	
4	2	Monica Boggioni	Italy	39.57	
5	7	Shenggao He	China	39.75	
6	3	Martinez Guerrero	Colombia	39.77	
7	1	Cuan Yao	China	41.32	
8	8	Agata Koupilova	Czech Republic	41.48	

=== S6 ===
Heats

Ten swimmers entered this event, although one did not start. The event took place on 5 August.

The applicable records at the start of the event where as follows

Record	Swimmer	Nation	Time
World Record	Anna Hontar	Ukraine	32.75
Championship Record	Anna Hontar	Ukraine	32.75

Rank	Heat	Lane	Name	Nation	Result	Notes
1	2	4	Anna Hontar	Ukraine	33.23	Q
2	2	5	Yuyan Jiang	China	33.84	Q
3	1	5	Ellie Marks	United States	34.08	Q
4	1	3	Nicole Turner	Ireland	35.01	Q
5	1	4	Shelby Newkirk	Canada	35.3	Q
6	2	6	Nora Meister	Switzerland	35.53	Q
7	2	2	Sofiia Fedorenko	Ukraine	37.98	Q
8	1	2	Nomuun Khurel	Mongolia	45.37	Q
9	1	6	Ayaallah Tewfick	Egypt	51.27	
-	2	3	Tully Kearney	Great Britain	DNS	

Final

Rank	Lane	Swimmer	Nation	Time	Notes
1st place, gold medalist(s)	4	Anna Hontar	Ukraine	32.55	WR
2nd place, silver medalist(s)	5	Yuyan Jiang	China	32.90	AS
3rd place, bronze medalist(s)	2	Shelby Newkirk	Canada	34.04	
4	3	Ellie Marks	United States	34.34	
5	6	Nicole Turner	Ireland	34.71	
6	7	Nora Meister	Switzerland	35.46	
7	1	Sofiia Fedorenko	Ukraine	37.88	
8	8	Nomuun Khurel	Mongolia	51.65	

=== S7 ===
8 swimmers entered this race, which proceeded directly to final.

The applicable records on entry were as follows:

Record	Swimmer	Nation	Time
World record	Mallory Weggemann	United States	31.64
Championship record	Mallory Weggemann	United States	31.64

Final

Rank	Lane	Swimmer	Nation	Times
1st place, gold medalist(s)	4	Sara Vargas Blanco	Colombia	33.01
2nd place, silver medalist(s)	5	Danielle Dorris	Canada	33.99
3rd place, bronze medalist(s)	6	Sabine Weber-Treiber	Austria	34.91
4	2	Leyre Orti Campos	Spain	35.48
5	1	Mandujan Somellera	Mexico	35.94
6	3	An Nishida	Japan	36.44
7	7	Nicola St Clair Maitland	Sweden	36.71
8	8	Agnes Kramer	Sweden	36.79

=== S8 ===
11 swimmers entered the event.

The applicable records entering the event were as follows:

Record	Swimmer	Nation	Time
World record	Alice Tai	Great Britain	28.97
Championship record	Alice Tai	Great Britain	29.55

Heats

Rank	Heat	Lane	Name	Nation	Result	Notes
1	2	4	Cecília Jerônimo de Araújo	Brazil	30.63	Q
2	2	5	Alice Tai	Great Britain	31.5	Q
3	1	4	Xenia Francesca Palazzo	Italy	31.72	Q
4	1	5	Shengnan Jiang	China	31.92	Q
5	1	6	Zhu Hui	China	32.48	Q
6	2	3	Abi Tripp	Canada	32.85	Q
7	2	6	Paula Novina	Croatia	33.08	Q
8	1	3	Tupou Neiufi	New Zealand	33.37	Q
9	2	7	Carmen Lim	Malaysia	35.79	
10	2	2	Paola Ruvalcaba	Mexico	36.26	
11	1	2	Eunyeong Lim	South Korea	36.63	

Final

Rank	Lane	Athlete	Nation	Result	Notes
1st place, gold medalist(s)	4	Cecília Jerônimo de Araújo	Brazil	30.03	
2nd place, silver medalist(s)	5	Alice Tai	Great Britain	30.97	
3rd place, bronze medalist(s)	6	Shengnan Jiang	China	31.07	
4	3	Xenia Francesca Palazzo	Italy	31.25	
5	7	Abi Tripp	Canada	32.74	
5	2	Hui Zhu	China	32.74	
7	8	Tupou Neiufi	New Zealand	32.77	
8	1	Paula Novina	Croatia	33.24	

=== S9 ===
8 swimmers entered this event, which progressed straight to final. The final took place on 6 August.

Final

The applicable records entering the event were as follows:

Record	Swimmer	Nation	Time
World record	Sophie Pascoe	New Zealand	27.32
Championship record	Sophie Pascoe	New Zealand	27.77

Rank	Lane	Swimmer	Nation	Result	Notes
1st place, gold medalist(s)	4	Mariana Ribeiro	Brazil	27.70	CR
2nd place, silver medalist(s)	5	Alexa Leary	Australia	28.03	
3rd place, bronze medalist(s)	3	Florianne Bultje	Netherlands	29.36	
4	6	Emily Beecroft	Australia	29.37	
5	7	Sarai Gascon	Spain	29.56	
6	2	Elizabeth Smith	United States	29.67	
7	8	Xu Jialing	China	30.09	
8	1	Susana Veiga	Portugal	30.42	

=== S10 ===
12 swimmers entered this event. The heats were held on Monday 31 July. The top eight, regardless of heat, progressed to the final.

WR: Aurelie Rivard (Canada) : 27.37

Heats

Rank	Heat	Lane	Name	Nation	Result	Notes
1	2	4	Aurelie Rivard	Canada	27.71	Q
2	2	5	María Barrera Zapata	Colombia	28.19	Q
3	1	5	Alessia Scortechini	Italy	28.32	Q
4	2	6	Emeline Pierre	France	28.36	Q
5	1	4	Chantalle Zijderveld	Netherlands	28.46	Q
6	2	3	Jasmine Greenwood	Australia	28.69	Q
7	1	7	Bianka Pap	Hungary	28.82	Q
8	2	2	Zhang Meng	China	28.87	Q
9	1	3	Arianna Hunsicker	Canada	28.99	
10	1	6	Susannah Kaul	Estonia	29.12	
11	2	7	Audrey Kim	United States	29.48	
12	1	2	Katie Cosgriffe	Canada	29.86	

Final

The Final took place at 20:38 on 31 July.

Rank	Lane	Athlete	Nation	Result	Notes
1st place, gold medalist(s)	4	Aurelie Rivard	Canada	27.64	
2nd place, silver medalist(s)	3	Alessia Scortechini	Italy	28.06	
3rd place, bronze medalist(s)	6	Emeline Pierre	France	28.39	
4	5	María Barrera Zapata	Colombia	28.41	
5	7	Jasmine Greenwood	Australia	28.43	
6	2	Chantalle Zijderveld	Netherlands	28.46	
7	1	Bianka Pap	Hungary	28.85	
8	8	Meng Zhang	China	30.93	

=== S11 ===
WR: Ma Jia (China) 29.20

Heats

Rank	Heat	Lane	Name	Nation	Result	Notes
1	1	4	Ma Jia	China	29.32	Q
2	2	5	Liesette Bruinsma	Netherlands	30.02	Q
3	2	4	Karolina Pelendritou	Cyprus	30.04	Q
4	2	3	Li Guizhi	China	30.39	Q
5	1	3	Ishiura Tomomi	Japan	31.28	Q
6	1	6	Kateryna Tkachuk	Ukraine	31.47	Q
7	2	6	Cai Liwen	China	31.72	Q
8	2	2	Scarlett Humphrey	Great Britain	31.74	Q
9	1	5	Analuz Pellitero	Argentina	32.06	
10	1	2	Tatiana Blattnerova	Slovakia	33.44	
11	1	7	Ono Chikako	Japan	33.85	
12	2	7	Nadia Baez	Argentina	34.03	
13	2	1	Fernandez Yunque	Colombia	34.57	
14	1	1	Mcclain Hermes	United States	35.98	

Final

The final was held at 19:38 on 31 July.

Rank	Lane	Athlete	Nation	Result	Notes
1st place, gold medalist(s)	4	Ma Jia	China	29.74	
2nd place, silver medalist(s)	5	Liesette Bruinsma	Netherlands	30.07	
3rd place, bronze medalist(s)	3	Karolina Pelendritou	Cyprus	30.28	
4	6	Li Guizhi	China	30.6	
5	2	Tomomi Ishiura	Japan	30.89	
6	1	Cai Liwen	China	31.31	
7	8	Scarlett Humphrey	Great Britain	31.91	
8	7	Kateryna Tkachuk	Ukraine	32.26	

=== S12 ===
10 Swimmers representing eight national teams entered the race. Heats were held in the morning of 2 August. The top eight swimmers, regardless of heat, qualify for the final.

The applicable records entering the event were as follows:

Record	Swimmer	Time
World record	Maria Gomes Santiago (BRA)	26.68
Championship record	Maria Gomes Santiago (BRA)	26.86

Heats

Rank	Heat	Lane	Athlete	Nation	Result	Notes
1	2	4	Maria Carolina Gomes Santiago	Brazil	26.65	Q WR CR
2	2	5	Anna Stetsenko	Ukraine	28.42	Q
3	1	4	Lucilene da Silva Sousa	Brazil	28.69	Q
4	1	5	Alessia Berra	Italy	28.72	Q
5	2	3	Jenna Jones	Australia	28.73	Q
6	2	6	Karina Petrikovicova	Slovakia	30.83	Q
7	1	3	Cornelle Leach	South Africa	31.22	Q
8	1	6	Yaryna Matlo	Ukraine	31.43	Q
9	1	2	Belkis Mota Echarry	Venezuela	31.45	
10	2	2	Neele Labudda	Germany	32.19	

Final

Rank	Lane	Athlete	Nation	Result	Notes
1st place, gold medalist(s)	4	Maria Carolina Gomes Santiago	Brazil	26.71	
2nd place, silver medalist(s)	5	Anna Stetsenko	Ukraine	28.01	
3rd place, bronze medalist(s)	6	Alessia Berra	Italy	28.38	
4	3	Lucilene da Silva Sousa	Brazil	28.56	
5	2	Jenna Jones	Australia	29.09	
6	7	Karina Petrikovicova	Slovakia	30.16	
7	1	Cornelle Leach	South Africa	31.35	
8	8	Yaryna Matlo	Ukraine	31.37	

=== S13 ===
Nine swimmers took part in this event. It was held on 6 August.

Record	Swimmer	Nation	Time
World record	Katja Dedekind	Australia	26.56
Championship record	Katja Dedekind	Australia	26.98

Heats

Rank	Heat	Lane	Name	Nation	Result	Notes
1	2	4	Katja Dedekind	Australia	27.88	Q
2	2	5	Carlotta Gilli	Italy	28.01	Q
3	1	4	Ayano Tsujiuchi	Japan	28.03	Q
4	1	3	Emma Feliu Martin	Spain	28.5	Q
4	2	3	Olivia Chambers	United States	28.5	Q
6	1	5	Marian Polo López	Spain	28.52	Q
7	1	6	Joanna Mendak	Poland	28.98	Q
8	1	2	Muslima Odilova	Uzbekistan	29.37	Q
9	2	2	Rebecca Redfern	Great Britain	29.41	

Final

Rank	Lane	Swimmer	Nation	Time
1st place, gold medalist(s)	4	Katja Dedekind	Australia	27.17
2nd place, silver medalist(s)	5	Carlotta Gilli	Italy	27.49
3rd place, bronze medalist(s)	2	Olivia Chambers	United States	27.69
4	3	Ayano Tsujiuchi	Japan	27.74
5	6	Emma Feliu	Spain	28.02
6	7	Marian Polo López	Spain	28.43
7	1	Joanna Mendak	Poland	29.01
8	8	Muslima Odilova	Uzbekistan	29.36
