= Cyprus at the Paralympics =

- IPC code: CYP
- NPC: Cyprus National Paralympic Committee
- Website: www.paralympic.org.cy
- Medals Ranked 83rd: Gold 3 Silver 4 Bronze 3 Total 10

Summer appearances
- 1988; 1992; 1996; 2000; 2004; 2008; 2012; 2016; 2020; 2024

Cyprus made its Paralympic Games début at the 1988 Summer Paralympics in Seoul, with a delegation of six athletes competing in archery, track and field, and swimming. The country has taken part in every subsequent edition of the Summer Paralympics, but has never participated in the Winter Paralympics.

Cyprus did not win any medals until the 2004 Games in Athens, where swimmer Karolina Pelendritou became the first Cypriot Paralympic champion, in the women's 100m breaststroke (SB13 category). Except two silvers won in 2008 Games all the six another medals has won by Pelendritou. Pelendritou went on to win her fourth and Cyprus' sixth Paralympic medal at 2012 Games in London with a silver medal in the 100m breaststroke (SB12 category).

== List of medallists ==
| Medal | Name | Games | Sport | Event |
|---|---|---|---|---|
| Gold | Karolina Pelendritou | 2004 Athens | Swimming | Women's 100 m Breaststroke SB13 |
| Gold | Karolina Pelendritou | 2008 Beijing | Swimming | Women's 100 m Breaststroke SB12 |
| Gold | Karolina Pelendritou | 2020 Tokyo | Swimming | Women's 100 m Breaststroke SB11 |
| Silver | Antonis Aresti | 2008 Beijing | Athletics | Men's 200 m T46 |
| Silver | Antonis Aresti | 2008 Beijing | Athletics | Men's 400 m T46 |
| Silver | Karolina Pelendritou | London 2012 | Swimming | Women's 100 m Breastroke SB12 |
| Bronze | Karolina Pelendritou | Beijing 2008 | Swimming | Women's 200 m Individual Medley SM12 |
| Bronze | Karolina Pelendritou | Tokyo 2020 | Swimming | Women's 50m freestyle S11 |

== See also ==
- Cyprus at the Olympics
