= Swimming at the 2020 Summer Paralympics – Women's 100 metre backstroke S11 =

Women's 100 metre backstroke S11 at the XVI Paralympic Games
- Venue: Tokyo Aquatics Centre
- Dates: 28 August 2021
- Competitors: 8 from 4 nations

Medalists
1st place, gold medalist(s)		Cai Liwen	China
2nd place, silver medalist(s)		Wang Xinyi	China
3rd place, bronze medalist(s)		Li Guizhi	China

The Women's 100 metre backstroke S11 event at the 2020 Paralympic Games took place on 28 August 2021, at the Tokyo Aquatics Centre.

== Final ==
Rank	Lane	Name	Nationality	Time	Notes
1st place, gold medalist(s)	5	Cai Liwen	China	1:13.46	WR
2nd place, silver medalist(s)	4	Wang Xinyi	China	1:13.71	
3rd place, bronze medalist(s)	3	Li Guizhi	China	1:16.98	
4	6	Anastasiia Shevchenko	RPC	1:20.00	
5	2	Sofiia Polikarpova	RPC	1:21.52	
6	7	Maryna Piddubna	Ukraine	1:21.65	
7	1	Kateryna Tkachuk	Ukraine	1:21.76	
8	8	Martina Rabbolini	Italy	1:24.34	
