= Swimming at the 2020 Summer Paralympics – Women's 100 metre breaststroke SB11 =

Women's 100 metre breaststroke SB11 at the XVI Paralympic Games
- Venue: Tokyo Aquatics Centre
- Dates: 1 September 2021
- Competitors: 10 from 9 nations

Medalists
1st place, gold medalist(s)		Karolina Pelendritou	Cyprus
2nd place, silver medalist(s)		Ma Jia	China
3rd place, bronze medalist(s)		Yana Berezhna	Ukraine

The Women's 100 metre breaststroke SB11 event at the 2020 Paralympic Games took place on 1 September 2021, at the Tokyo Aquatics Centre.

== Heats ==
The swimmers with the top eight times, regardless of heat, advanced to the final.

Rank	Heat	Lane	Name	Nationality	Time	Notes
1	1	4	Ma Jia	China	1:23.09	Q
2	2	4	Karolina Pelendritou	Cyprus	1:24.54	Q, ER
3	2	5	Liesette Bruinsma	Netherlands	1:28.19	Q
4	1	5	Yana Berezhna	Ukraine	1:29.45	Q
5	2	3	Nadia Báez	Argentina	1:31.00	Q
6	2	2	Cai Liwen	China	1:32.02	Q
7	1	3	Sofiia Polikarpova	RPC	1:32.89	Q
8	1	6	Martina Rabbolini	Italy	1:33.02	Q
9	2	6	Tatiana Blattnerová	Slovakia	1:36.52	
10	1	2	McClain Hermes	United States	1:48.39	

== Final ==
Rank	Lane	Name	Nationality	Time	Notes
1st place, gold medalist(s)	5	Karolina Pelendritou	Cyprus	1:19.78	WR
2nd place, silver medalist(s)	4	Ma Jia	China	1:19.82	
3rd place, bronze medalist(s)	6	Yana Berezhna	Ukraine	1:27.02	
4	3	Liesette Bruinsma	Netherlands	1:27.29	
5	2	Nadia Báez	Argentina	1:30.77	
6	7	Cai Liwen	China	1:30.97	
7	1	Sofiia Polikarpova	RPC	1:32.84	
8	8	Martina Rabbolini	Italy	1:34.29	
