= Anastasia Pagonis =

American Paralympic swimmer

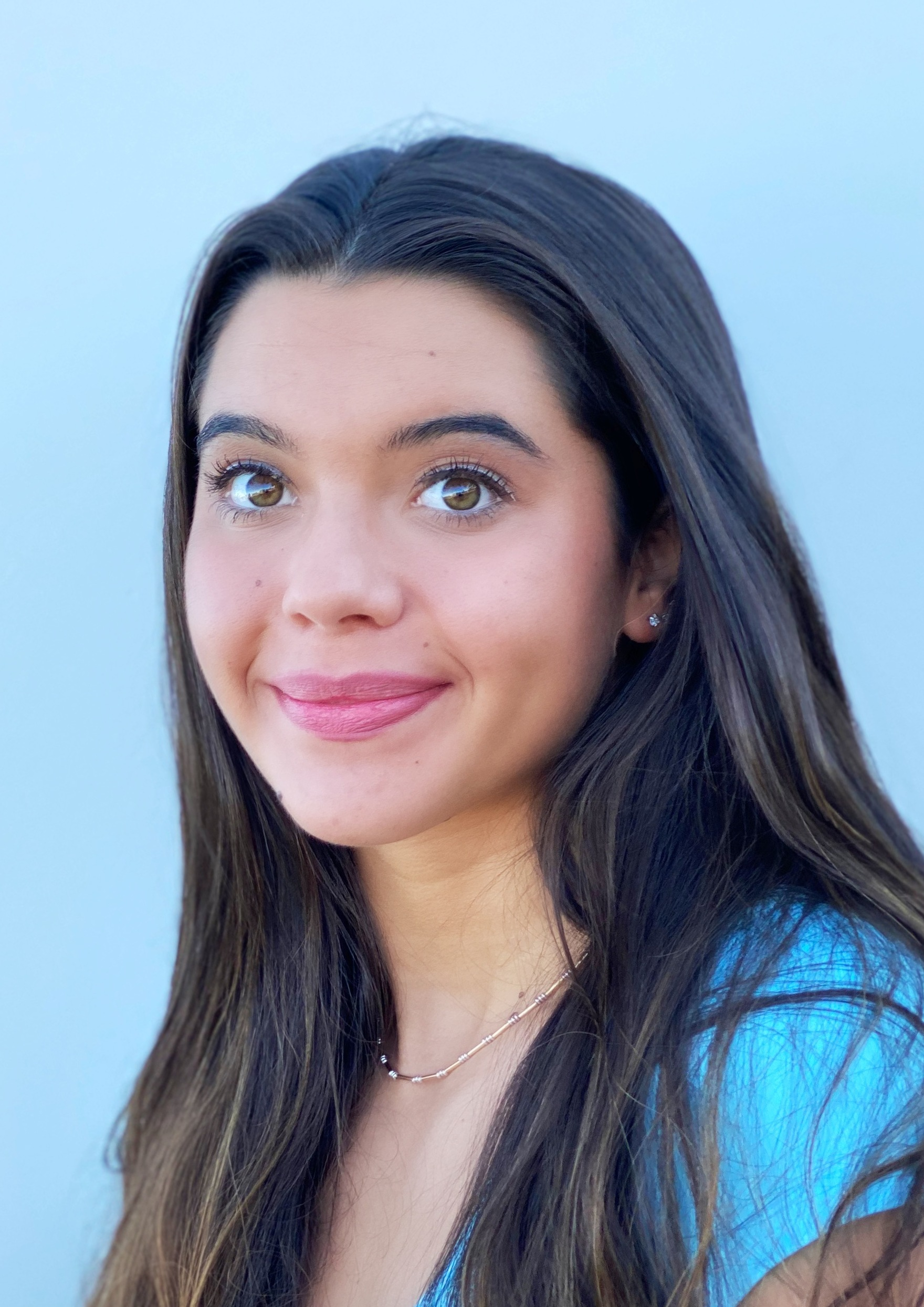
- Pagonis in 2020

Personal information
- Nickname: Tas
- Nationality: American
- Born: May 2, 2004 (age 22) Long Island, New York, U.S.
- Home town: Garden City, New York, U.S.
- Height: 5 ft 5 in (1.65 m)

Sport
- Sport: Paralympic swimming
- Disability: Autoimmune retinopathy
- Disability class: S11
Medal record
Women's paralympic swimming
Representing United States
Paralympic Games
Gold medal – first place	2020 Tokyo	400 m freestyle S11
Bronze medal – third place	2020 Tokyo	200 m ind. medley SM11
World Championships
Gold medal – first place	2022 Madeira	100 m freestyle S11
Gold medal – first place	2022 Madeira	400 m freestyle S11
Gold medal – first place	2022 Madeira	200 m ind. medley SM11

Anastasia Pagonis (Greek: Αναστασία Παγώνης; born May 2, 2004) is an American Paralympic swimmer. She represented the United States at the 2020 Summer Paralympics. She is a world record and American record holder within the sport.

== Career ==
Pagonis made her international debut at the 2020 WPS World Series event in Melbourne, Australia in February 2020, where she won gold in the 400 metre freestyle and won a bronze medal in the 200 metre medley. She also finished eighth in the 50 metre freestyle and fourth in the 100 metre freestyle.

At the US Paralympic trials, Pagonis set the world 400 metre freestyle S11 record twice, once during the prelims, then again during the finals. These records were not yet ratified before the 2020 Summer Paralympics began. In June 2021 it was announced that Pagonis was named to Team USA, competing in swimming at the 2020 Summer Paralympics in Tokyo, Japan.

At just 17-years-old, Pagonis represented the United States in the women's 400 metre freestyle S11 event at the 2020 Summer Paralympics where she set the S11 class world record in the preliminary heat with a time of 4:58.40. Pagonis broke the world record again during finals with a time of 4:54.49 to win gold, her first Paralympic medal and the United States' first gold medal at the Paralympics. She competed in the women's 200 metre individual medley SM11 event where she set an American record with a time of 2:45:61 and won a bronze medal.

On April 14, 2022, Pagonis was named to the roster to represent the United States at the 2022 World Para Swimming Championships. She made her World Championships debut on June 15, 2022, and won a gold medal in the 200 metre individual medley SM11 event with a time of 2:49.73.

Pagonis underwent shoulder surgery in June 2023, and returned to swimming and training for the 2024 Summer Paralympics in December 2023.

== Personal life ==
Pagonis' diagnosis is autoimmune retinopathy which caused her sight to deteriorate rapidly at the age of 11, and she lost her vision by the age of 14. She has a guide dog named Radar, which she says changed her life and helped her with the depression she had due to her vision loss. She shares videos on TikTok and Instagram educating people about blindness. Her family is from Greece.
