= Autoimmune retinopathy =

Medical condition affting the eyes

- Specialty: Immunology Ophthalmology

Autoimmune retinopathy (AIR) is a rare immunological disease in which the patient's immune system attacks proteins in the retina, leading to loss of vision. Researchers do not yet fully understand the disease, but it may be the result of cancer or cancer chemotherapy. Autoimmune retinopathy is an autoimmune condition characterized by vision loss, blind spots, and visual field abnormalities. Autoimmune retinopathy can be divided into paraneoplastic (PAIR) or non-paraneoplastic (nPAIR). The nPAIR division can be further divided into cancer-associated retinopathy (CAR) and melanoma-associated retinopathy (MAR). The condition is associated with retinal degeneration, when autoimmune antibodies recognize retinal proteins as antigens and target them, leading to retinal degeneration.

== Types ==
=== Cancer-associated retinopathy ===
A division of AIR, cancer-associated retinopathy is a paraneoplastic syndrome, which is a disorder caused by an immune system response to an abnormality. Autoimmune antibodies target proteins in retinal photoreceptor cells. The proteins targeted as antigenic are recoverin, α-enolase and transducin. This autoimmune response leads to photoreceptor cell death. It causes progressive vision loss that can lead to blindness. CAR is typically associated with the anti-recoverin antibody.

=== Melanoma-associated retinopathy ===
Retinal bipolar cells (cells in retina that transmit signals) react with the antibodies, leading to cell death. Although it is less prevalent than CAR, diagnosed cases of MAR continue to increase while CAR numbers decrease.

== Signs and symptoms ==
Both CAR and MAR share the same symptoms. This is because they are both paraneoplastic syndromes. AIR symptoms are numerous and shared by many other diseases.

Symptoms
Progressive Vision Loss
Blind Spots in Vision
Photopsia
Nyctalopia
Scotomas
Dislike/avoidance of Light
Loss of Contrast Sensitivity
Incomplete Color Blindness
Decreased Night Vision
Rod and Cone Dysfunction

== Pathophysiology ==
Antiretinal antibodies (ARAs) likely cause the pathogenesis of AIR by targeting retinal antigens. Autoimmune retinopathy is also related to molecular mimicry, in which foreign antigens and self antigens have a similar sequence, eliciting an autoimmune response. In nPAIR, the molecular mimicry occurs between retinal proteins and viral/bacterial antigens, while in PAIR, it occurs between tumor antigens and retinal proteins. The most common antibodies found in CAR and nPAIR, respectively, are against recoverin (23kDa) and alpha-enolase. Presence of these particular antibodies is related to symptoms and diagnosis of AIR in patients. Different subtypes of AIR cause dysfunction of varying retinal cells, resulting in varying vision impairment. Both nPAIR and CAR cause dysfunction of rods and cones, while MAR causes dysfunction of only rods. Cone dysfunction is responsible for photosensitivity, loss of color vision, and decreased visual acuity. Rod dysfunction, however, is responsible for loss of peripheral field ad prolonged darkness adaptation. Many factors contribute to the pathogenesis of Autoimmune Retinopathy, contributing to it being poorly understood and requiring further research.

== Immunology and Autoimmunity ==
The immune system is a network of cells, molecules, and organs that function to protect the body from any form of harm. In autoimmune diseases like autoimmune retinopathy (AIR), the immune system attacks the body's own tissues and cells. In AIR, the retina, a highly specialized tissue, becomes the target of this misdirected immune response. How both innate and adaptive immunity contribute to the pathogenesis of AIR is extremely important to determining the mechanisms of the disease for future research endeavors.

=== Innate Immunity in Autoimmune Retinopathy ===
The innate immune system is the body's first line of defense and responds rapidly to infectious agents. It is nonspecific, meaning it is activated without previous exposure to the agent. However, in the context of AIR, components of the innate immune response can inadvertently contribute to tissue damage in the retina.

The innate immune response in AIR is often triggered when immune cells recognize damage-associated molecular patterns (DAMPs) released by damaged retinal cells. These signals are detected by pattern recognition receptors (PRRs) on innate immune cells such as macrophages and dendritic cells. Once activated, these cells release pro-inflammatory cytokines, which can further promote inflammation within the retina. While these inflammatory mediators can normally help to fight infections, in autoimmune diseases like AIR, they progress tissue damage by promoting the activation of both the innate and adaptive immune responses within the body.

Specialized macrophages in the retina (also known as microglia) play an important role in inflammation of the retina. In AIR, microglial cells become activated and contribute to retinal degeneration through the release of inflammatory factors. Additionally, these cells can present antigens to adaptive immune cells, initiating the transition from an innate to adaptive immune response. Although the innate immune response is critical for early detection and inflammation in AIR, it also plays a role in amplifying the autoimmune process, leading to progressive retinal damage and vision loss.

=== Adaptive Immunity in Autoimmune Retinopathy ===
The adaptive immune system is responsible for generating specific and long-lasting immune responses to pathogens. It involves T cells and B cells, which are both extremely important in the pathogenesis of AIR.

In AIR, B cells are mainly responsible for the production of autoantibodies that target retinal proteins. These autoantibodies are central to the development of the disease. Recoverin, for example, is a retinal protein, and when autoantibodies bind to it, they interfere with its function, leading to retinal cell death. These autoantibodies can trigger further immune responses that result in complement system activation, which contributes to further damage to the retina. The production of these retina-specific autoantibodies is a key factor of the disease and plays a critical role in its diagnosis.

In addition to B cells, T cells also contribute to the autoimmune response in AIR. Cytotoxic T cells, or CD8+ T cells, can directly attack retinal cells expressing antigens that have been recognized as foreign by other immune cells. These T cells are recruited to the retina through the action of pro-inflammatory cytokines, furthering the tissue damage to the retina. Helper T cells (CD4+ T cells) are also involved, aiding in the activation of B cells and cytotoxic T cells, further amplifying the immune response.

A key feature of the adaptive immune system is the development of immune system memory, which can lead to autoimmune diseases being chronic. In AIR, once the immune system has been exposed to retinal antigens, it continues to produce autoreactive antibodies and T cells even in the absence of an initial trigger. This chronic immune response is a primary factor in the long-term and progressive retinal damage observed in AIR.

The failure of immune tolerance mechanisms in AIR is another critical element in the pathogenesis of the disease. Normally, the immune system has regulatory mechanisms, such as regulatory T cells (Tregs), that maintain tolerance to self-antigens and prevent autoreactive immune responses. In AIR, however, these regulatory mechanisms are often impaired, allowing autoreactive T cells and antibodies to persist and attack retinal tissues. The impairment of tolerance to these antigens in AIR can be furthered by molecular mimicry, as mentioned previously, where foreign antigens share similar structure and properties with retinal proteins, leading to the targeting of self-tissues.

== Diagnosis ==
It is difficult to diagnose AIR due to the overlap of symptoms with other disorders. There is no standardized protocol for diagnosis, leading to AIR being extremely underdiagnosed or misdiagnosed as diseases such as retinitis pigmentosa. Examination of the fundus (inner surface of eye) can show no results or it can show narrowing of the blood vessels, abnormal colouration of the optic disc, and retinal atrophy. Fundus examination results are not indicative of autoimmune retinopathy but they are used to initiate the diagnostic process. An electroretinogram (eye test used to see abnormalities in the retina) is used to detect AIR. An abnormal electroretinogram (ERG) with respect to light and dark adaptations indicates AIR. The ERG also allows differentiation between cancer-associated retinopathy and melanoma-associated retinopathy. If the ERG shows cone responses, CAR can be prematurely diagnosed. If the ERG shows a significant decrease in b-wave amplitude, MAR can be prematurely diagnosed. To confirm, analysis for anti-retinal antibodies through Western blotting of serum collected from the patient, immunohistochemistry (IHC), or enzyme-linked immunosorbent assay (ELISA). Since AIR is an autoimmune disease, it is likely related to a family history of autoimmune disease, which can be used to make a tentative diagnosis. While diagnosis of AIR is typical in patients >60 years of age, it can present in younger patients as well, especially those with nPAIR.

=== Autoimmune retinopathy vs. retinitis pigmentosa ===
One of the challenges in diagnosing autoimmune retinopathy (AIR) is its overlap of symptoms with other retinal diseases, particularly retinitis pigmentosa (RP). Both conditions share similar symptoms, such as progressive vision loss, night blindness, and blind spots. However, they have different underlying causes. RP is a hereditary disorder caused by mutations that lead to the degeneration of photoreceptor cells, typically starting with peripheral vision loss and progressing to central vision loss over time. In contrast, AIR is an acquired condition where the immune system attacks retinal cells, often leading to more rapid vision deterioration and additional symptoms such as photophobia and color vision loss.

While both conditions affect the retina, AIR tends to progress faster and can be associated with a history of cancer or systemic inflammation. RP, on the other hand, is usually a lifelong, slowly progressing disorder with a genetic basis.

=== Risk factors ===
With Autoimmune retinopathy being so understudied, complex, and misdiagnosed, risk factors are important in determining its diagnosis. These risk factors include age, gender, and history of cancer. Other factors such as bacterial/viral infections, environmental factors, and heredity could be linked to the development of autoimmune retinopathy, but this is not proven.

=== Age and Gender ===
Autoimmune retinopathy is most commonly diagnosed in those over the age of 60, but can occur at any age. Non-paraneoplastic autoimmune retinopathy, especially, is more prevalent at younger ages, as it does not have a connection to cancer and can be linked to a known autoimmune condition. Gender also plays a role, as autoimmune conditions are known to be more common in women. With AIR specifically, this is suggested by studies as well.

=== History of Cancer ===
A major risk factor for AIR is a history of cancer, especially in paraneoplastic autoimmune retinopathy, where the autoimmune response is triggered by cancerous cells and cancer treatments. Cancer-associated retinopathy is commonly linked with cancers such as lung cancer and breast cancer, which trigger an autoimmune response due to malignant cells. In these cases, the immune system produces antibodies targeting retinal proteins, leading to retinal degeneration and overall vision loss. Melanoma-associated autoimmune retinopathy, another form of paraneoplastic autoimmune retinopathy, is associated with melanoma, resulting in antibodies targeting other varieties of retinal cells. Treatment for cancers such as chemotherapy and radiation is also considered a risk factor for development of autoimmune retinopathy, as chemotherapies and other cancer-treatment components have been proven to elicit autoimmune responses.

== Treatment ==
Due to the difficulty of diagnosis, managing this disease is a challenge. For this reason, there is no established treatment for AIR. Clinicians try to reduce and control the autoimmune system attack to prevent any irreversible retinal damage. Methods of treatment include intravenous immunoglobulin (IVIG), plasmapheresis, and corticosteroids. In PAIR, treatment of cancerous bodies are typically used such as tumor removal, chemotherapy, or radiation. For nPAIR, treatment is more experimental with the use of systemic or local corticosteroids. Another form of treatment currently in the clinical trial stage is with intravitreal dexamethasone implant (IDI), which has shown promising results. The overall goal of these treatments, however, is not to reverse the damage done by AIR, but to inhibit progression patient vision loss. Future research in AIR and treatment possibilities is crucial to identifying appropriate and effective therapeutic methods.

=== Immunoglobulin ===
Immunoglobulin samples are obtained from a large pool of healthy, matched donors (10000 - 20000). The immunoglobulin mixture is then administered through IV at a rate of 0.4g/kg/day for 5 days. Antibodies in the IVIG mixture interact with binding sites of the disease-associated antibodies (such as anti-recoverin antibodies). This prevents binding to proteins targeted as antigenic and reduces disease activity. Treatment responses vary and depend on whether the patient has been diagnosed with cancer. Patients who respond positively show improvement in the clarity of their vision and their visual field.

=== Plasmapheresis ===
Plasmapheresis involves separating blood into two parts - blood cells and plasma. The blood plasma components, such as the antibodies, are treated outside of the body. After removal of the disease-associated antibodies, the blood cells and plasma are transfused back into the body. Response to this treatment depends on how much retinal damage has been done. Patients who respond positively show significant visual gains.

=== Corticosteroids ===
Corticosteroids are administered through IV or orally. They cause lymphocytopenia, a condition where white blood cell levels are abnormally low. Corticosteroids cause white blood cell death, lowering their numbers throughout the body. They also cause white blood cells to recirculate away from the area of damage (the retina). This minimizes damage caused by the antibodies produced by the white blood cells. Often, this treatment is combined with plasmapheresis. Instead of treating the plasma and blood cells, they are replaced with a healthy donor mixture. Patients who respond positively show improved visual fields and an almost complete disappearance of anti-retinal antibodies.

== Management ==
Since AIR is a chronic, rare, and often misunderstood disease, there is not yet a standardized management protocol and most are only in preliminary stages. Once a confirmed diagnosis is made for AIR, there is not much that can be done to impact the outcome, which depends on type of antibody present. However, there are some management methods that suggest to be successful. Immunosuppression therapy uses corticosteroids and other immunomodulatory drugs to stabilize the disease. In some cases though, this therapy has shown minor visual recovery. Plasmapheresis, which is used to decrease photoreceptor damage, has been used in combination with immunomodulators and showed some improvement in visual properties. While using immunosuppression therapy, antioxidant supplementation can prevent against retinal degeneration by providing necessary vitamins and minerals for retinal health. Overall, there is no standardized management protocol, but studies suggest that a combination of methods would be the most successful. The primary issue with AIR diagnosis is acceptance of progressive vision loss and navigation of its effect on daily life.
