= Wang Xinyi =

Chinese Paralympic swimmer (born 2003)

Personal information
- Nationality: Chinese
- Born: 20 July 2003 (age 22) Cangzhou, Hebei, China

Sport
- Sport: Paralympic swimming
- Disability class: S11
Medal record
Representing China
Women's Paralympic swimming
Summer Paralympics
Silver medal – second place	2020 Tokyo	100 m backstroke S11
World Championships
Gold medal – first place	2019 London	100 m backstroke S11
Gold medal – first place	2023 Manchester	100 m backstroke S11
Silver medal – second place	2023 Manchester	100 m freestyle S11
Asian Para Games
Bronze medal – third place	2022 Hangzhou	400 m freestyle S11

Wang Xinyi (born 20 July 2003) is a Chinese Paralympic swimmer. She represented China at the 2020 Summer Paralympics.

== Career ==
Wang represented China in the women's 100 metre backstroke S11 event at the 2020 Summer Paralympics and won a silver medal.
