= Anastasiia Shevchenko =

Russian para swimmer (born 1998)

Personal information
- Nationality: Russian
- Born: 25 October 1998 (age 27)

Sport
- Sport: Para swimming
- Disability class: S11
Medal record
Women's para swimming
Representing Neutral Paralympic Athletes
World Championships
Bronze medal – third place	2025 Singapore	100 m backstroke S11
Representing Russia
European Championships
Bronze medal – third place	2026 Kocaeli	100 m backstroke S11

Anastasiia Shevchenko (born 25 October 1998) is a Russian para swimmer. She competed at 2020 and 2024 Summer Paralympics.

== Career ==
Shevchenko represented Russian Paralympic Committee athletes at the 2020 Summer Paralympics in five events, with her best finish being fourth place in the 100 metre backstroke S11 event. She then represented Neutral Paralympic Athletes at the 2024 Summer Paralympics. She competed at the 2025 World Para Swimming Championships and won a bronze medal in the 100 metre backstroke S11 event.
