= Antonis Aresti =

Cypriot Paralympic sprinter

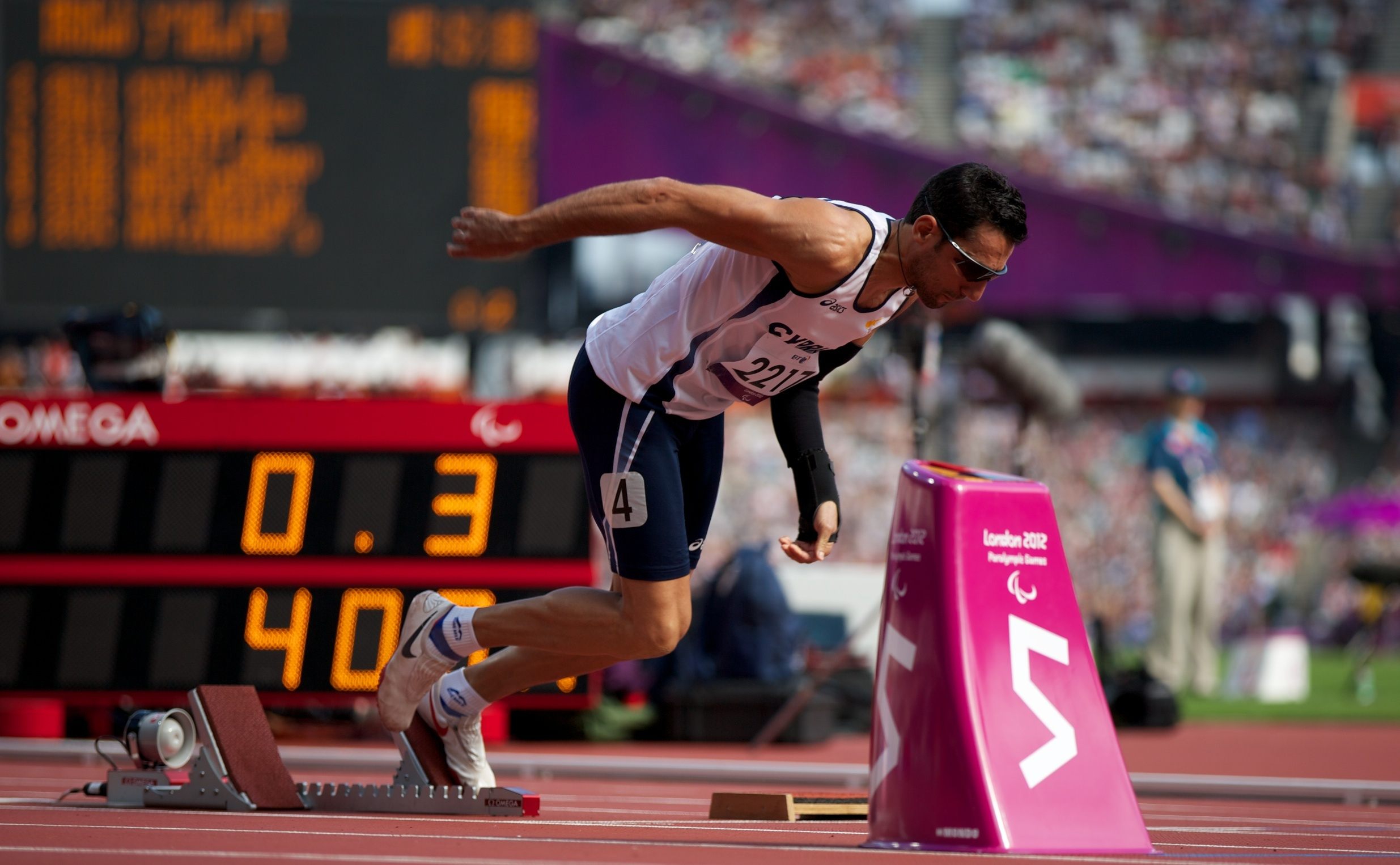
- Aresti at the 2012 Summer Paralympics

Personal information
- Nationality: Cyprus
- Born: February 15, 1983 (age 43) Limassol, Cyprus

Sport
- Sport: Running

Achievements and titles
- Personal bests: 100m T46: 11.08 200m T46: 22.01 400m T46: 48.51
Medal record
Representing Cyprus
Men's Athletics
Paralympic Games
Silver medal – second place	2008 Beijing	200m T46
Silver medal – second place	2008 Beijing	400m T46
World Championships
Gold medal – first place	2011 Christchurch	200m T46
Gold medal – first place	2011 Christchurch	400m T46
Bronze medal – third place	2006 Assen	400m T46
European Championships
Gold medal – first place	2012 Stadskanaal	200m T46
Gold medal – first place	2012 Stadskanaal	400m T46
Silver medal – second place	2012 Stadskanaal	100m T46
Bronze medal – third place	2016 Grosseto	400m T46

Antonis Aresti (Greek: Αντώνης Αρέστη) is a former athlete and Paralympian from Cyprus who competed mainly in category T46 and T47 sprint events.

He competed in the 2008 Summer Paralympics in Beijing, China. There he won a silver medal in the men's 200 metres – T46 event and a silver medal in the men's 400 metres – T46 event

== Career ==
Born on 15 February 1983 in Limassol, Cyprus by Leonidas and Androula Aresti. At the age of three years, Aresti was dragged by a moving car while he was trying to cross the street. The accident caused a damage on his left hand. Such disability pushed the Cypriot sprinter to deal with sports.

He started practising athletics at early age by participating in school events mainly in long-distance races. At age 14 he started running seriously. Then, he won many medals in local youth championships in athletics. Also, he participated in world organisations as a member of the national team of Cyprus.

He studied Physical Education at National Sports Academy (NSA) of Bulgaria in Sofia and graduated in 2008. His coach is Efthymios Kyprianou.

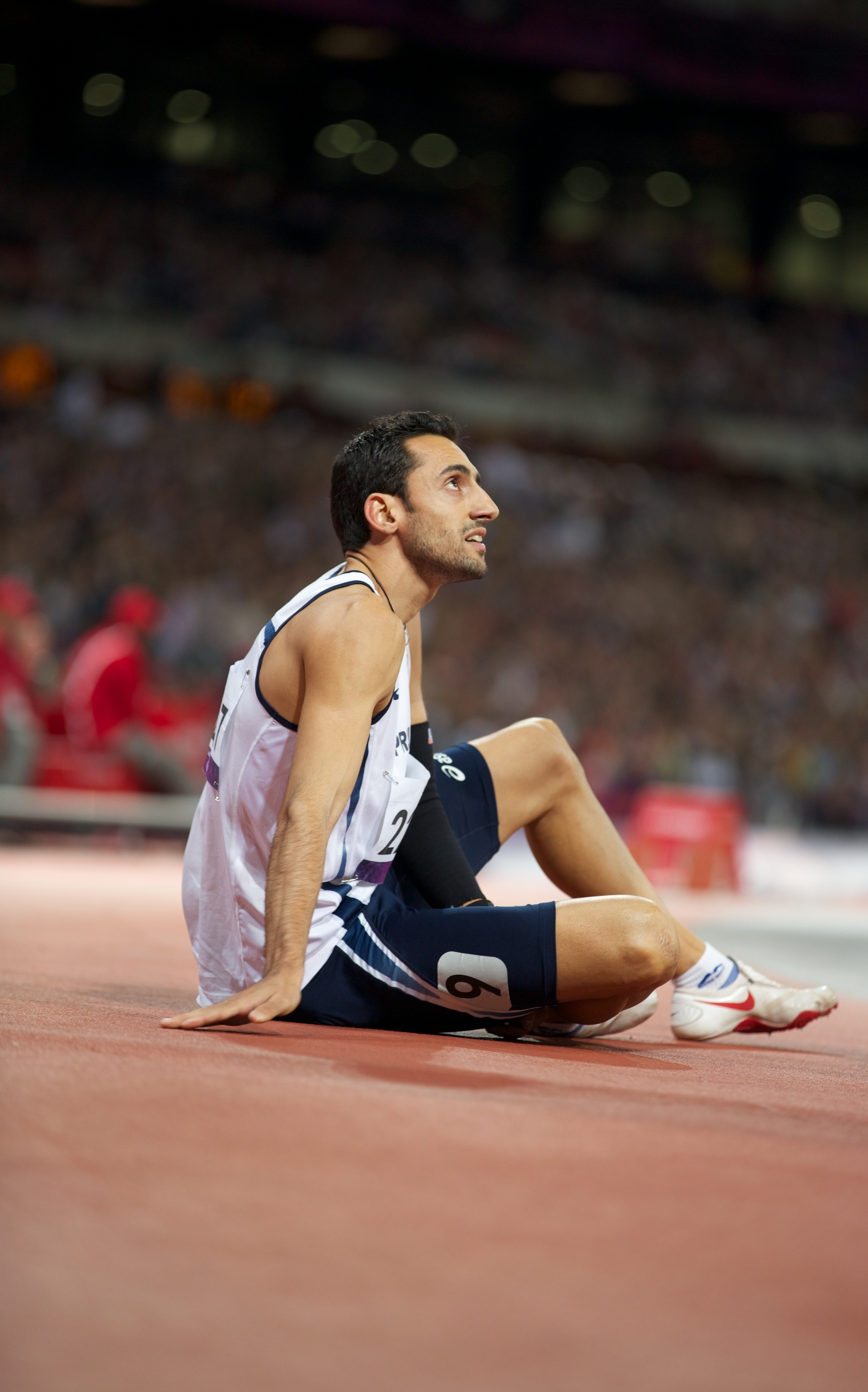
Antonis Aresti after the 400m T46 final race for the London 2012 Paralympics

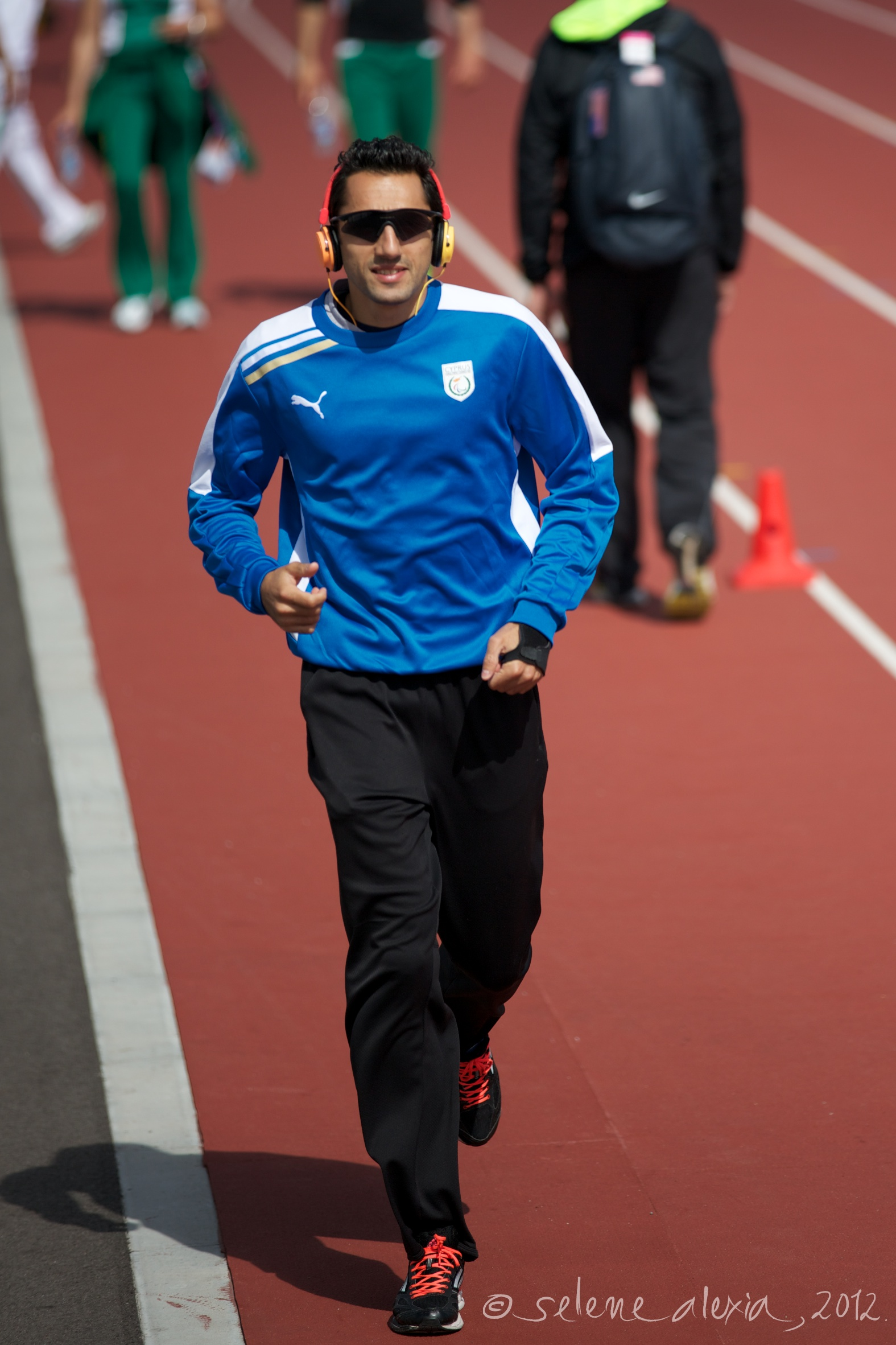
Aresti training for the London 2012 Paralympics

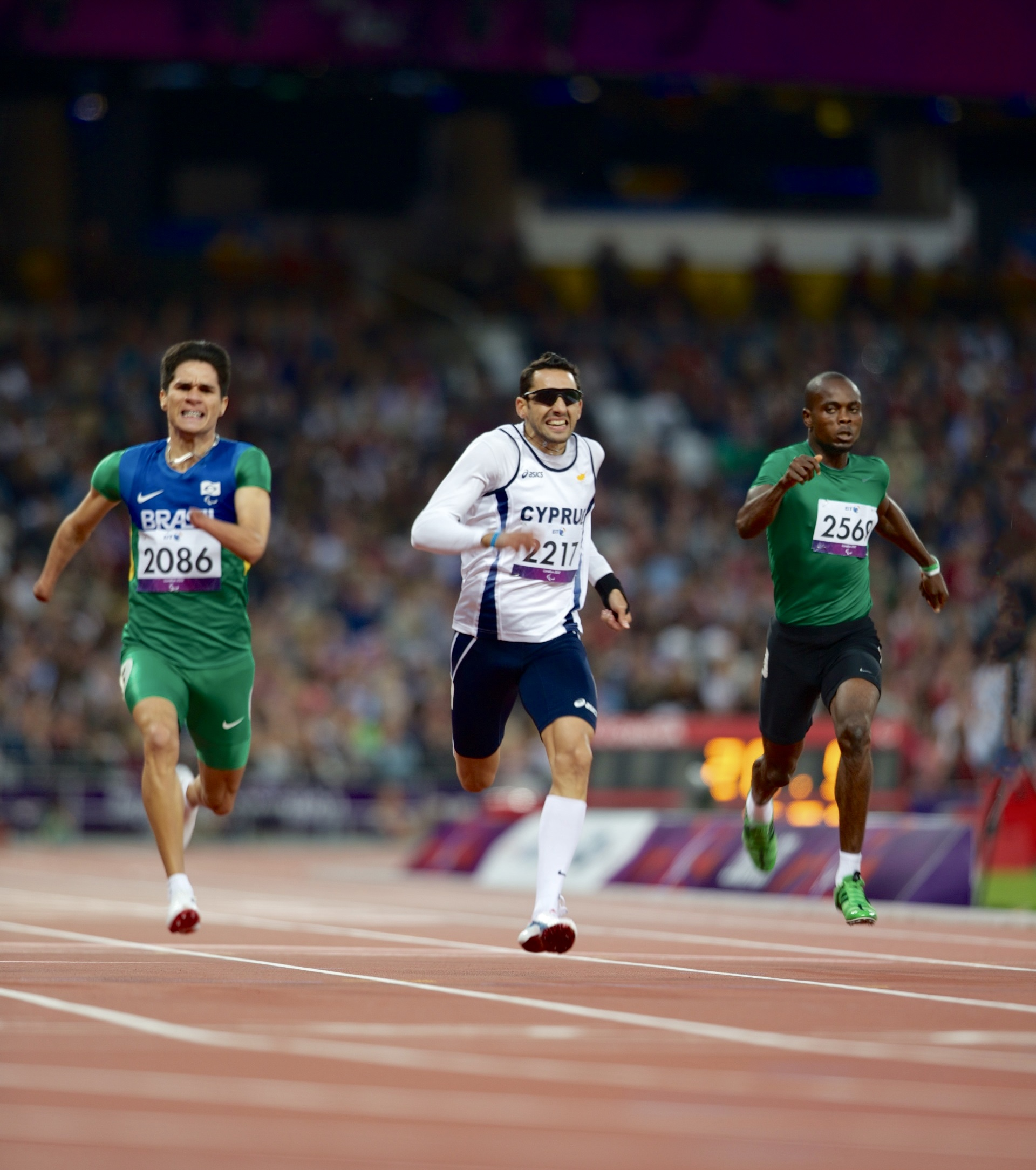
Antonis Aresti crossing the finish line of the 400m T46 qualifying race for the London 2012 Paralympics

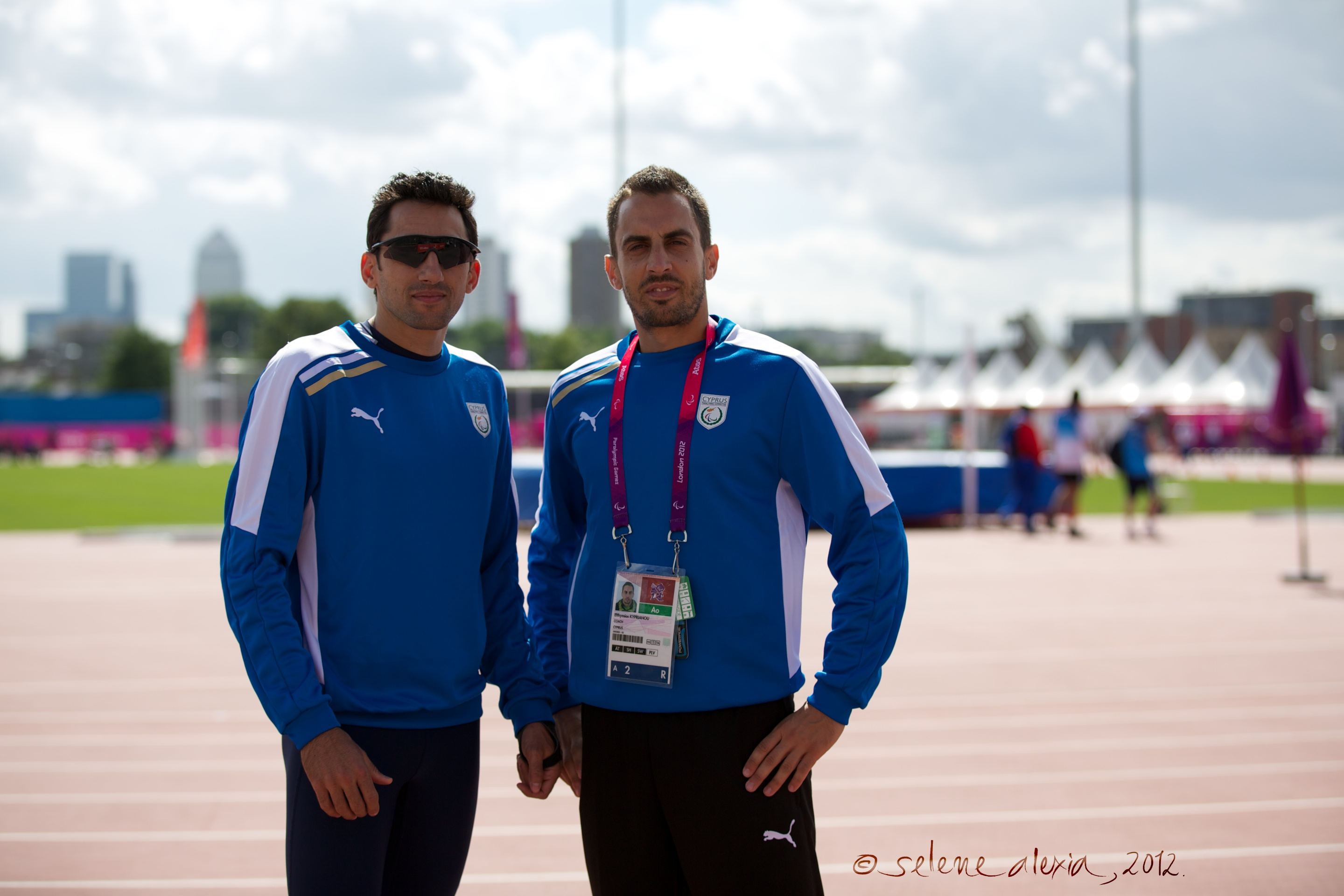
Antonis Aresti and his coach, Euthymios Kyprianou, after training for the London 2012 Paralympics

== World and European Championships ==
Aresti's first big worldwide success occurred during his participation at the Athletics World Championship for athletes with disabilities in Assen, Netherlands in 2006, where he won the bronze medal in the men's 400 meters category T46. The second worldwide success of the Cypriot runner, occurred in 2007 during his participation at the Athletics World Championships organised by the International Wheelchair and Amputee Sports Federation (IWAS) in Taipei, Taiwan where he won the silver medal in the men's 200 meters category T46.

In January 2011, Aresti participated in the Athletics World Championship for athletes with disabilities in Christchurch of New Zealand. He won two gold medals at the finals of the events: Men's 200 meters category T46 and Men's 400 meters category T46 with times of 22.25 seconds and 49.44 seconds respectively.

Additionally, the Cypriot champion athlete conquered three more medals in the 2012 European Championships organised by the International Paralympic Committee in June 2012 in Stadskanaal. Specifically, he won the gold medal in men's 400 meters category T46 with a time of 50.55 seconds, the gold in the men's 200 meters category T46 with a time of 22.58 seconds and a silver medal in men's 100 meters category T46 with a time of 11.36 seconds.

After three years of absence from the land of the track due to injuries, Aresti returns to world athletic events in 2015. In June 2015, Aresti participated in the Hellenic Championship for Disabled Athletes and secured the limit for his participation in the Athletics World Championship for athletes with disabilities organized in Doha, Qatar in October 2015 by the International Paralympic Committee in category T47.

In June 2016, the Cypriot champion athlete participated in 2016 European Championships organised by the International Paralympic Committee in Grosseto, Italy. Aresti won his 4th medal in European level.

Competition	Venue	Position	Medal	Event	Time
2006 IPC Athletics World Championships	Assen, Netherlands	3rd	Bronze	400m T46	50.24
2007 IWAS Athletics World Championship	Taipei, Taiwan	2nd	Silver	200m T46	
2011 IPC Athletics World Championships	Christchurch, New Zealand	1st	Gold	200m Τ46	22.25
2011 IPC Athletics World Championships	Christchurch, New Zealand	1st	Gold	400m T46	49.44
2012 IPC Athletics European Championships	Stadskanaal, Netherlands	1st	Gold	400m T46	50.55
2012 IPC Athletics European Championships	Stadskanaal, Netherlands	1st	Gold	200m T46	22.58
2012 IPC Athletics European Championships	Stadskanaal, Netherlands	2nd	Silver	100m T46	11.36
2015 IPC Athletics World Championships	Doha, Qatar	7th		400 m Τ47	50.55
2015 IPC Athletics World Championships	Doha, Qatar	6th		200 m Τ47	22.72
2016 IPC Athletics European Championships	Grosseto, Italy	2nd	Silver	400 m Τ47	50.44
2016 IPC Athletics European Championships	Grosseto, Italy	4th		200 m Τ47	23.20
2016 IPC Athletics European Championships	Grosseto, Italy	5th		100 m Τ47	11.75

== Participation in Paralympic Games ==
Aresti participated at the 13th Summer Paralympic Games held in Beijing in September 2008. His participation was a great moment for both his career and the history of Cypriot sport since he managed to win two silver medals in the Men's 200m T46 and Men's 400m T46 with times of 22.15 seconds and 48.87 seconds respectively.

During the 14th Summer Paralympic Games held in London in 2012, the Cypriot sprinter participated and finished fourth in the finals of men's 200m category T46 and men's 400m category T46 with times 22.40 seconds and 49.59 seconds respectively. Also, he participated in the men's 100m race category T46 with time 11.36 but did not qualify for the final race of the event.

Aresti secured participation in the 15th Summer Paralympic Games to be held in Rio de Janeiro in September 2016.

Competition	Venue	Position	Medal	Event	Time	
2008 Summer Paralympics	Beijing, China	2nd	Bronze	200m T46	22.15	
2008 Summer Paralympics	Beijing, China	2nd	Bronze	400m T46	48.87	
2012 Summer Paralympics	London, United Kingdom	4th		200m T46	22.40	RR
2012 Summer Paralympics	London, United Kingdom	4th		400m T46	49.59	SB
2012 Summer Paralympics	London, United Kingdom	nq		100m T46	11.36	

== Personal Bests ==
Date	Competition	Event	Venue	Time
July 30, 2011	Stoke Mandeville Disability Athletics Challenge	100m T46	Stoke Μandeville, United Kingdom	11.08
	Athletics Pancyprian Championship	200m T46	Nicosia, Cyprus	22.01
	Athletics Bulgarian Championship	400m T46	Sofia, Bulgaria	48.51

== Other Participation ==
Year	Competition	Venue	Position	Event	Time	
2009	International Athletics Meeting	Thessaloniki, Greece	8th	200 m	22.69	
2010	International Athletics Meeting	Thessaloniki, Greece	5th	400 m	48.71	
year	International Athletics Meeting	city, Italy	1st	200 m T46	22.60	
year	International Athletics Meeting	city, Italy	1st	400 m T46	49.50	
2011	Stoke Mandeville Disability Athletics Challenge	Stoke Μandeville, United Kingdom		100 m T46	11.08	PB
2011	Stoke Mandeville Disability Athletics Challenge	Stoke Μandeville, United Kingdom		200 m T46	22.70	
