= Karolina Pelendritou =

Cypriot Paralympic swimmer

Personal information
- Full name: Karolina Pelendritou
- Nationality: Cypriot
- Born: 25 September 1986 (age 39) Limassol, Cyprus

Sport
- Sport: Swimming
- Strokes: Freestyle; Breaststroke; Butterfly; Medley
Medal record
Women's swimming
Paralympic Games
Gold medal – first place	2004 Athens	100m breaststroke SB13
Gold medal – first place	2008 Beijing	100m breaststroke SB13
Bronze medal – third place	2008 Beijing	200m individual medley SM12
Silver medal – second place	2012 London	100m breaststroke SB12
Gold medal – first place	2020 Tokyo	100m breaststroke SB11
Bronze medal – third place	2020 Tokyo	50m freestyle S11
Silver medal – second place	2024 Paris	50 m freestyle S11
Bronze medal – third place	2024 Paris	100 m breaststroke SB11
World Championships
Silver medal – second place	2002 Mar del Plata	100m breaststroke SB13
Gold medal – first place	2010 Eindhoven	100m breaststroke SB13
Gold medal – first place	2013 Montreal	100m breaststroke SB13
Gold medal – first place	2015 Glasgow	100m breaststroke SB13
Gold medal – first place	2022 Madeira	100m breaststroke SB11
Gold medal – first place	2022 Madeira	50m freestyle S11
Gold medal – first place	2023 Manchester	100m breaststroke SB11
Bronze medal – third place	2023 Manchester	50m freestyle S11
Silver medal – second place	2025 Singapore	50 m freestyle S11
Silver medal – second place	2025 Singapore	100 m breaststroke SB11
European Championships
Gold medal – first place	2014 Eindhoven	100m breaststroke SB12
Bronze medal – third place	2016 Funchal	100 m breaststroke SB12

Karolina Pelendritou (Greek: Καρολίνα Πελενδρίτου; born 25 August 1986) is a visually impaired swimmer from Cyprus. She has won gold medals and broken records in national and international games as well as winning three gold medals, a silver and two bronze over four Paralympic Games (winning medals in each Games except for 2016 when she came in 4th). Due to her achievements she is known as the "Princess of the Pool".

Pelendritou was the first living person to appear on a national Cypriot stamp, in 2004. She has promoted the work of various EU initiatives throughout the years, currently holding the title of ambassador for the "Youth On The Move" initiative since 2010.

== Early life ==
She began swimming at the age of 9. A family member of hers, Antonakis Katsiounis, started to take her swimming. He noticed that she had a hidden talent. At the age of 10 she became a member of the Cyprus Swimming Federation with the Nautical Club of Limassol and at 13 years old she became a member of the National Swimming Team and soon broke records in all categories of the 50m and 100m breaststroke.

== Career ==
=== 2003 till 2007: 'Athens Paralympic Games 2004' ===
In 2003, at the European meeting in the Czech Republic, she set a new European record in 100m S13 breaststroke and world record in the 50m S13 backstroke.

On 25 September 2004, in the Athens Olympic Aquatic Centre, she won the gold medal at the 2004 Summer Paralympic Games, competing in the 100m breaststroke S13 setting a Paralympic record. This gold medal was the first Olympic medal ever awarded to an athlete from Cyprus. She was honoured by being the first living person to ever appear on a Cypriot stamp following this achievement at her first Paralympic Games.

In the same year she was appointed as 'Ambassador Against Discrimination' (Stop Discrimination) for the European Union. Pelendritou has faced her own struggle for equality on behalf of athletes with disabilities in Cyprus. She held the position as an ambassador for three years.

In 2005, following her nomination for the Leader Awards, she was awarded the title of 'Young Leader of the Year' and the prestigious 'Diamond Leader Award'.

In March 2006, she reaffirmed her talents by breaking four times the world record in the 50m and 100m breaststroke S12 during the British Open Championships and the European Cup, held in early May 2006 in the Czech Republic.

At the British Open Swimming Championship in Sheffield, she won a gold medal setting a new world record in the 100m breaststroke S12 in 2007. She also competed in the 50m and 100m freestyle S12 winning two more gold medals. In the European Cup “EUROWAVES” in the Czech Republic she brought home yet another gold medal in the 100m breaststroke S12 and shattered the world record once again. In August 2007 she represented Cyprus the 3rd World Championships and Games-IBSA, which were held in Brazil, where she won the gold medal in the 200m breaststroke S12 breaking the world record of the event and gold medal in 100m breaststroke S12 record with a new Games record.

=== 2008 - 2010: 'Beijing Paralympic Games 2008' ===
In 2008 Pelendritou took the 100m breaststroke S12 at the Open British Championships and the 50M freestyle where she won another two gold medals. In the German Open Swimming Championships she achieved another gold medal in the 200m breaststroke S12, Gold medal in the 100m breaststroke, breaking the World Record and a silver medal in the 50m breaststroke. A week later in Czech Republic in the European Cup she broke another world record in the 100m breaststroke S12. On 8 September 2008 at the Summer Paralympic Games in Beijing, Pelendritou broke the world record in the qualifying heats of the 100m breaststroke event with a time of 1:16.82. She followed this by winning her second gold medal of her career at a Paralympic Games and became a double Paralympic gold medallist from two consecutive Paralympics. At these Paralympic Games in Beijing she also won a bronze medal in the 200M medley S12 and came fifth place in the 50m freestyle event. In June 2008 she was selected out of the nominees from 72 participating countries for the "Elite Athletes Award 2007" of the Commonwealth Sports Awards. Again this made her the first Cypriot to ever receive such an award. This honour was awarded to her during an event which was organised by Lord Provost at the Kelvingrove Art Gallery and Museum in Glasgow on 12 June 2008 in the presence of 200 representatives from the Commonwealth countries.

During the years of 2006 and 2008 she was appointed as 'Women of the Year' by the magazine Madame Figaro.

At the IPC Swimming World Championships in November 2009 in Rio, Brazil, she won the gold medal in the 100m freestyle and shattered the world record in the 100m breaststroke S12 category with a time of 1:14.35. At the IPC Swimming World Championships in Eindhoven, the Netherlands, she brought home another gold medal in the 100m breaststroke S12, and secured her place to participate in the 2012 Paralympic Games in London. At the European Championships in Berlin she won the gold medal in the 100m breaststroke S12.

2010 brought with it another ambassador position within the EU for Karolina. She was appointed the title of ambassador for the "Youth On The Move" initiative of the EU, a role which involves supporting and promoting the youth of the EU.

=== 2012 and beyond: 'London Paralympic Games 2012' and 'Tokyo 2020' ===
After the Beijing Paralympic Games, Pelendritou went through a particularly difficult phase of her life regarding her health. After undergoing 3 operations in 4 years, in November 2011 she was told by her doctors that she must stop swimming professionally. Despite this advice, Karolina was determined to carry on swimming and exceed all expectations. As she later explained in 2012 during a speech in her hometown of Limassol, "swimming is my life...and I said to myself that I would try with every strength I had to carry on. I tried very hard to compete even in just one race at the Paralympic Games of London. My experience from November to today has been very difficult: full of disappointments and tears. But I wanted it so badly and I achieved it!"

In 2012, at the German Open Championships in Berlin, she won the gold medal in the 50m breaststroke S12, setting yet another world record.

Later on that summer Pelendritou went on to compete in her third consecutive Paralympic Games in London 2012. She competed in the 100m breastroke SB12 and took second place with a time of 1:16.38 missing out on first place by a very narrow 0:00.21. She, once again, shattered the already-existing Paralympic and world records that she herself had set four years previously at the Beijing Paralympic Games.
