= Cyprus National Paralympic Committee =

National Paralympic Committee of Cyprus

National Paralympic Committee
- Country: Cyprus
- Code: CYP
- Created: 1999
- Continental association: EPC
- Headquarters: Nicosia, Cyprus
- President: Andreas Kamarlingou
- Secretary General: Andreas Georgiou
- Website: www.paralympic.org.cy

The Cyprus National Paralympic Committee (Greek: Κυπριακή Εθνική Παραολυμπιακή Επιτροπή, romanized: Kypriakí Ethnikí Paraolympiakí Epitropí) is the National Paralympic Committee in Cyprus for the Paralympic Games movement. It is a non-profit organisation that selects teams, and raises funds to send Cypriot competitors to Paralympic events organised by the International Paralympic Committee (IPC).

== See also ==
- Cyprus at the Paralympics
