= Swimming at the 2016 Summer Paralympics – Men's 200 metre individual medley SM13 =

Men's 200 metre individual medley SM13 at the XV Paralympic Games
- Venue: Olympic Aquatics Stadium
- Dates: 10 September 2016
- Competitors: 17 from 10 nations

Medalists
1st place, gold medalist(s)		Ihar Boki	Belarus
2nd place, silver medalist(s)		Iaroslav Denysenko	Ukraine
3rd place, bronze medalist(s)		Danylo Chufarov	Ukraine

The Men's 200 metre individual medley SM13 event at the 2016 Paralympic Games took place on 10 September 2016, at the Olympic Aquatics Stadium. Three heats were held. The swimmers with the eight fastest times advanced to the final.

== Heats ==
=== Heat 1 ===
10:38 10 September 2016:

Rank	Lane	Name	Nationality	Time	Notes
1	4	Dzmitry Salei	Azerbaijan	2:16.31	Q
2	5	Sergii Klippert	Ukraine	2:16.35	Q
3	3	Dmitriy Horlin	Uzbekistan	2:16.84	Q
4	6	Thomaz Matera	Brazil	2:20.02	
5	2	Roman Agalakov	Kazakhstan	2:28.37	

=== Heat 2 ===
10:43 10 September 2016:

Rank	Lane	Name	Nationality	Time	Notes
1	4	Iaroslav Denysenko	Ukraine	2:12.87	Q
2	5	Sean Russo	Australia	2:16.37	Q
3	3	Jacob Templeton	Australia	2:18.72	Q
4	6	Antti Latikka	Finland	2:23.70	
5	7	Liam Bekric	Australia	2:24.11	
6	2	Devin Gotell	Canada	2:28.27	

=== Heat 3 ===
10:47 10 September 2016:

Rank	Lane	Name	Nationality	Time	Notes
1	4	Ihar Boki	Belarus	2:06.13	PR Q
2	5	Danylo Chufarov	Ukraine	2:15.36	Q
3	3	Raman Salei	Azerbaijan	2:19.37	
4	6	Firdavsbek Musabekov	Uzbekistan	2:19.98	
5	2	Ivan Salguero Oteiza	Spain	2:23.05	
6	7	Tyler Mrak	Canada	2:27.61	

== Final ==
18:54 10 September 2016:

Rank	Lane	Name	Nationality	Time	Notes
1st place, gold medalist(s)	4	Ihar Boki	Belarus	2:04.02	PR
2nd place, silver medalist(s)	5	Iaroslav Denysenko	Ukraine	2:08.76	
3rd place, bronze medalist(s)	3	Danylo Chufarov	Ukraine	2:11.12	PR
4	6	Dzmitry Salei	Azerbaijan	2:13.83	
5	1	Dmitriy Horlin	Uzbekistan	2:15.18	
6	7	Sean Russo	Australia	2:16.29	
7	2	Sergii Klippert	Ukraine	2:16.47	
8	8	Jacob Templeton	Australia	2:20.90	
