= Swimming at the 2012 Summer Paralympics – Men's 50 metre freestyle S13 =

Event at the 2012 Summer Paralympics

Men's 50m Freestyle S13 at the XIV Paralympic Games
- Venue: London Aquatics Centre
- Dates: 1 September 2012
- Competitors: 14 from 8 nations
- Winning time: 23.99

Medalists
1st place, gold medalist(s)		Charles Bouwer	South Africa
2nd place, silver medalist(s)		Ihar Boki	Belarus
3rd place, bronze medalist(s)		Oleksii Fedyna	Ukraine

The men's 50m freestyle S13 event at the 2012 Summer Paralympics took place at the London Aquatics Centre on 1 September. There were two heats; the swimmers with the eight fastest times advanced to the final.

== Results ==
=== Heats ===
Competed from 11:30.

==== Heat 1 ====
Rank	Lane	Name	Nationality	Time	Notes
1	4	Dzmitry Salei	Belarus	24.33	Q
1	5	Tim Antalfy	Australia	24.33	Q, OC
3	6	Carlos Farrenberg	Brazil	24.71	Q, AM
4	2	Aleksandr Golintovskii	Russia	24.96	Q
5	3	Daniel Sharp	New Zealand	25.16	
6	7	Daniel Holt	New Zealand	25.89	
7	1	Maksym Zavodnyy	Ukraine	26.35	

==== Heat 2 ====
Rank	Lane	Name	Nationality	Time	Notes
1	6	Ihar Boki	Belarus	24.26	Q
2	5	Charles Bouwer	South Africa	24.36	Q, AF
3	4	Oleksii Fedyna	Ukraine	24.57	Q
4	3	Charalampos Taiganidis	Greece	24.74	Q
5	2	Danylo Chufarov	Ukraine	25.15	
6	7	Sean Russo	Australia	25.48	
7	1	Stepan Smagin	Russia	25.62	

=== Final ===
Competed at 19:53.

Rank	Lane	Name	Nationality	Time	Notes
1st place, gold medalist(s)	6	Charles Bouwer	South Africa	23.99	AF
2nd place, silver medalist(s)	4	Ihar Boki	Belarus	24.07	
3rd place, bronze medalist(s)	2	Oleksii Fedyna	Ukraine	24.09	
4	3	Tim Antalfy	Australia	24.26	OC
5	5	Dzmitry Salei	Belarus	24.30	
6	7	Carlos Farrenberg	Brazil	24.62	AM
7	1	Charalampos Taiganidis	Greece	24.69	
8	8	Aleksandr Golintovskii	Russia	24.82	

Q = qualified for final. AM = Americas Record. AF = African Record. OC = Oceania Record.
