= Swimming at the 2012 Summer Paralympics – Men's 100 metre freestyle S13 =

Event at the 2012 Summer Paralympics

Men's 100m Freestyle S13 at the XIV Paralympic Games
- Venue: London Aquatics Centre
- Dates: 2 September 2012
- Competitors: 15 from 8 nations
- Winning time: 51.91

Medalists
1st place, gold medalist(s)		Ihar Boki	Belarus
2nd place, silver medalist(s)		Charles Bouwer	South Africa
3rd place, bronze medalist(s)		Aleksandr Golintovskii	Russia

The men's 100m freestyle S13 event at the 2012 Summer Paralympics took place at the London Aquatics Centre on 2 September. There were two heats; the swimmers with the eight fastest times advanced to the final.

== Results ==
=== Heats ===
Competed from 10:41.

==== Heat 1 ====
Rank	Lane	Name	Nationality	Time	Notes
1	4	Charles Bouwer	South Africa	53.28	Q, PR
2	6	Aleksandr Golintovskii	Russia	53.66	Q
3	3	Danylo Chufarov	Ukraine	54.05	Q
4	2	Roman Dubovoy	Russia	54.29	Q
5	5	Oleksii Fedyna	Ukraine	54.63	
6	7	Daniel Sharp	New Zealand	55.88	
7	1	Devin Gotell	Canada	57.75	

==== Heat 2 ====
Rank	Lane	Name	Nationality	Time	Notes
1	3	Ihar Boki	Belarus	52.08	Q, WR
2	4	Tim Antalfy	Australia	53.37	Q
3	5	Dzmitry Salei	Belarus	53.78	Q
4	6	Carlos Farrenberg	Brazil	54.46	Q, AM
5	2	Daniel Holt	New Zealand	55.23	
6	7	Stepan Smagin	Russia	55.42	
7	1	Sean Russo	Australia	55.97	
8	8	Maksym Zavodnyy	Ukraine	1:02.21	

=== Final ===
Competed at 18:34.

Rank	Lane	Name	Nationality	Time	Notes
1st place, gold medalist(s)	4	Ihar Boki	Belarus	51.91	WR
2nd place, silver medalist(s)	5	Charles Bouwer	South Africa	52.97	AF
3rd place, bronze medalist(s)	6	Aleksandr Golintovskii	Russia	53.45	
4	3	Tim Antalfy	Australia	53.63	
5	7	Danylo Chufarov	Ukraine	53.64	
6	2	Dzmitry Salei	Belarus	53.76	
7	1	Roman Dubovoy	Russia	53.84	
8	8	Carlos Farrenberg	Brazil	54.14	AM

Q = qualified for final. WR = World Record. PR = Paralympic Record. AM = Americas Record. AF = African Record.
