= Swimming at the 2012 Summer Paralympics =

Swimming at the XIV Paralympic Games
- Venue: London Aquatics Centre
- Dates: 30 August – 8 September 2012
- Competitors: 600 from 66 nations

Swimming at the 2012 Paralympic Games was held from 30 August to 8 September 2012 at the London Aquatics Centre in London, UK. The competition consisted of 148 events, across multiple classifications, and all swum in a long course (50m) pool. Up to 600 swimmers (340 males, 260 females) swam in the Games.

== Participating nations ==
On 23 May 2012, IPC Swimming announced that 66 nations had qualified for the 2012 Paralympics. Those nations (and their slot allocations) are:

- Argentina (8)
- Armenia (1)
- Australia (34)
- Austria (3)
- Azerbaijan (1)
- Belarus (6)
- Belgium (4)
- Brazil (20)
- Canada (24)
- Chile (1)
- China (51)
- Chinese Taipei (2)
- Colombia (6)
- Croatia (4)
- Cuba (2)
- Cyprus (1)
- Czech Republic (7)
- Denmark (5)
- Ecuador (1)
- Estonia (2)
- Faroe Islands (1)
- Finland (2)
- France (10)
- Georgia (1)
- Germany (21)
- Great Britain (49)
- Greece (11)
- Hong Kong (5)
- Hungary (9)
- Iceland (2)
- India (1)
- Indonesia (1)
- Iran (1)
- Iraq (1)
- Ireland (5)
- Israel (5)
- Italy (11)
- Japan (20)
- Kazakhstan (2)
- Latvia (1)
- Lithuania (1)
- Malaysia (2)
- Mexico (16)
- Myanmar (1)
- Netherlands (13)
- New Zealand (6)
- Norway (4)
- Philippines (1)
- Poland (9)
- Portugal (4)
- Romania (2)
- Russia (36)
- Singapore (2)
- Slovakia (2)
- Slovenia (1)
- South Africa (10)
- South Korea (9)
- Spain (32)
- Switzerland (1)
- Sweden (5)
- Thailand (7)
- Turkey (2)
- Ukraine (44)
- United States (34)
- Uruguay (1)
- Uzbekistan (1)
- Venezuela (4)
- Vietnam (3)

== Event schedule ==
Date	Men's events	Women's events
30 August	50 m freestyle S5; 400 m freestyle S12; 100 m backstroke S6; 100 m backstroke S7; 50 m breaststroke SB2; 100 m butterfly S8; 100 m butterfly S9; 200 m individual medley SM10	50 m freestyle S5; 400 m freestyle S12; 100 m backstroke S6; 100 m backstroke S7; 100 m butterfly S8; 100 m butterfly S9; 200 m individual medley SM10
31 August	50 m freestyle S10; 100 m freestyle S11; 400 m freestyle S8; 100 m backstroke S9; 100 m backstroke S14; 50 m freestyle S4; 50 m butterfly S7; 100 m butterfly S13	50 m freestyle S10; 100 m freestyle S11; 400 m freestyle S8; 100 m backstroke S9; 100 m backstroke S14; 50 m butterfly S7; 200 m individual medley SM5
1 September	50 m freestyle S11; 50 m freestyle S13; 200 m freestyle S2; 200 m freestyle S5; 400 m freestyle S6; 100 m breaststroke SB7; 100 m breaststroke SB8; 100 m butterfly S10	50 m freestyle S11; 50 m freestyle S13; 200 m freestyle S5; 400 m freestyle S6; 100 m breaststroke SB7; 100 m breaststroke SB8; 100 m butterfly S10
2 September	200 m individual medley SM7; 200 m freestyle S14; 100 m backstroke S11; 100 m freestyle S13; 100 m butterfly S12; 150 m individual medley SM4; 150 m individual medley SM3; 4x100 m freestyle relay 34 pts	200 m individual medley SM7; 200 m freestyle S14; 100 m backstroke S11; 100 m freestyle S13; 50 m freestyle S8; 100 m butterfly S12
3 September	200 m individual medley SM6; 100 m freestyle S7; 100 m freestyle S2; 100 m breaststroke SB11; 200 m individual medley SM12; 100 m backstroke S13; 50 m freestyle S8; 50 m breaststroke SB3	200 m individual medley SM6; 100 m freestyle S7; 100 m freestyle S3; 100 m breaststroke SB11; 200 m individual medley SM12; 4× 100 m freestyle relay 34 pts
4 September	100 m backstroke S8; 50 m freestyle S6; 400 m freestyle S9; 100 m backstroke S10; 100 m breaststroke SB4; 100 m freestyle S12; 50 m freestyle S7; 400 m freestyle S13	100 m backstroke S8; 50 m freestyle S6; 400 m freestyle S9; 100 m backstroke S10; 100 m breaststroke SB4; 100 m freestyle S12; 50 m freestyle S7
5 September	50 m freestyle S9; 100 m freestyle S4; 400 m freestyle S10; 50 m backstroke S2; 100 m backstroke S12; 100 m breaststroke SB5; 100 m breaststroke SB6; 200 m individual medley SM8	50 m freestyle S9; 400 m freestyle S10; 50 m backstroke S2; 100 m backstroke S12; 100 m breaststroke SB5; 100 m breaststroke SB6; 200 m individual medley SM8
6 September	100 m freestyle S8; 100 m freestyle S10; 400 m freestyle S7; 50 m backstroke S1; 50 m backstroke S4; 50 m backstroke S5; 100 m breaststroke SB14; 100 m butterfly S11; 200 m individual medley SM9	100 m freestyle S8; 100 m freestyle S10; 400 m freestyle S7; 50 m backstroke S4; 100 m breaststroke SB14; 200 m individual medley SM9
7 September	50 m freestyle S2; 50 m freestyle S12; 100 m freestyle S9; 400 m freestyle S11; 50 m butterfly S5; 50 m butterfly S6; 200 m individual medley SM13	50 m freestyle S3; 50 m freestyle S12; 100 m freestyle S9; 400 m freestyle S11; 50 m butterfly S5; 50 m butterfly S6; 200 m individual medley SM13; 4 × 100 m medley relay 34pts
8 September	100 m freestyle S5; 100 m freestyle S6; 200 m freestyle S4; 50 m backstroke S3; 100 m breaststroke SB9; 100 m breaststroke SB12; 100 m breaststroke SB13; 200 m individual medley SM11; 4 × 100 m medley relay 34pts	100 m freestyle S5; 100 m freestyle S6; 100 m breaststroke SB9; 100 m breaststroke SB12; 100 m breaststroke SB13; 200 m individual medley SM11

== Medal summary ==
=== Medal table ===
Rank	Nation	Gold	Silver	Bronze	Total
1	China (CHN)	24	13	21	58
2	Australia (AUS)	18	7	12	37
3	Ukraine (UKR)	17	14	13	44
4	United States (USA)	14	13	14	41
5	Russia (RUS)	13	17	12	42
6	Brazil (BRA)	9	4	1	14
7	Great Britain (GBR)	7	16	16	39
8	New Zealand (NZL)	5	6	1	12
9	Belarus (BLR)	5	2	0	7
10	Canada (CAN)	4	9	3	16
11	South Africa (RSA)	4	4	3	11
12	Netherlands (NED)	4	2	7	13
13	Mexico (MEX)	3	2	4	9
14	Spain (ESP)	2	11	9	22
15	Germany (GER)	2	7	3	12
16	France (FRA)	2	3	3	8
17	Japan (JPN)	2	2	4	8
18	Norway (NOR)	2	2	0	4
19	Italy (ITA)	2	0	5	7
20	South Korea (KOR)	2	0	1	3
21	Ireland (IRL)	2	0	0	2
22	Azerbaijan (AZE)	1	4	0	5
23	Hungary (HUN)	1	3	2	6
24	Poland (POL)	1	1	1	3
25	Sweden (SWE)	1	1	0	2
26	Iceland (ISL)	1	0	0	1
27	Greece (GRE)	0	2	3	5
28	Cuba (CUB)	0	1	1	2
29	Colombia (COL)	0	1	0	1
29	Cyprus (CYP)	0	1	0	1
31	Israel (ISR)	0	0	4	4
32	Hong Kong (HKG)	0	0	2	2
33	Argentina (ARG)	0	0	1	1
33	Croatia (CRO)	0	0	1	1
33	Czech Republic (CZE)	0	0	1	1
Totals (35 entries)		148	148	148	444

== Medals ==
=== Men's events ===
Event	Gold	Silver	Bronze
50 m freestyle S2	Yang Yang; China	Dmitry Kokarev; Russia	Aristeidis Makrodimitris; Greece
50 m freestyle S4	Eskender Mustafaiev; Ukraine	David Smétanine; France	Jan Povýšil; Czech Republic
50 m freestyle S5	Daniel Dias; Brazil	Sebastián Rodríguez; Spain	Roy Perkins; United States
50 m freestyle S6	Qing Xu; China	Lorenzo Perez Escalona; Cuba	Tao Zheng; China
50 m freestyle S7	Lantz Lamback; United States	Shiyun Pan; China	Matthew Walker; Great Britain
50 m freestyle S8	Denis Tarasov; Russia	Maurice Deelen; Netherlands	Yinan Wang; China
50 m freestyle S9	Matthew Cowdrey; Australia	Tamás Tóth; Hungary	José Antonio Mari-Alcaraz; Spain
50 m freestyle S10	André Brasil; Brazil	Nathan Stein; Canada	Andrew Pasterfield; Australia
50 m freestyle S11	Bozun Yang; China	Bradley Snyder; United States	Enhamed Enhamed; Spain
50 m freestyle S12	Maksym Veraksa; Ukraine	Aleksandr Nevolin-Svetov; Russia	Tucker Dupree; United States
50 m freestyle S13	Charl Bouwer; South Africa	Ihar Boki; Belarus	Oleksii Fedyna; Ukraine
100 m freestyle S2	Yang Yang; China	Dmitry Kokarev; Russia	Aristeidis Makrodimitris; Greece
100 m freestyle S4	Gustavo Sanchez Martinez; Mexico	Richard Oribe; Spain	David Smetanine; France
100 m freestyle S5	Daniel Dias; Brazil	Roy Perkins; United States	Sebastian Rodriguez; Spain
100 m freestyle S6	Qing Xu; China	Sebastian Iwanow; Germany	Lorenzo Perez Escalona; Cuba
100 m freestyle S7	Shiyun Pan; China	Matt Levy; Australia	Lantz Lamback; United States
100 m freestyle S8	Yinan Wang; China	Denis Tarasov; Russia	Konstantin Lisenkov; Russia
100 m freestyle S9	Matthew Cowdrey; Australia	Tamás Tóth; Hungary	Tamás Sors; Hungary
100 m freestyle S10	André Brasil; Brazil	Phelipe Andrews Melo Rodrigues; Brazil	Andrew Pasterfield; Australia
100 m freestyle S11	Bradley Snyder; United States	Bozun Yang; China	Hendri Herbst; South Africa
100 m freestyle S12	Maksym Veraksa; Ukraine	Aleksandr Nevolin-Svetov; Russia	Tucker Dupree; United States
100 m freestyle S13	Ihar Boki; Belarus	Charl Bouwer; South Africa	Aleksandr Golintovskii; Russia
200 m freestyle S2	Yang Yang; China	Dmitrii Kokarev; Russia	Itzhak Mamistvalov; Israel
200 m freestyle S4	Gustavo Sanchez Martinez; Mexico	David Smetanine; France	Richard Oribe; Spain
200 m freestyle S5	Daniel Dias; Brazil	Sebastián Rodríguez; Spain	Roy Perkins; United States
200 m freestyle S14	Jon Margeir Sverrisson; Iceland	Daniel Fox; Australia	Wonsang Cho; South Korea
400 m freestyle S6	Darragh McDonald; Ireland	Anders Olsson; Sweden	Matthew Whorwood; Great Britain
400 m freestyle S7	Josef Craig; Great Britain	Shiyun Pan; China	Andrey Gladkov; Russia
400 m freestyle S8	Yinan Wang; China	Oliver Hynd; Great Britain	Sam Hynd; Great Britain
400 m freestyle S9	Brenden Hall; Australia	Tamás Sors; Hungary	Federico Morlacchi; Italy
400 m freestyle S10	Ian Jaryd Silverman; United States	Benoit Huot; Canada	Robert Welbourn; Great Britain
400 m freestyle S11	Bradley Snyder; United States	Enhamed Enhamed; Spain	Bozun Yang; China
400 m freestyle S12	Sergey Punko; Russia	Enrique Floriano; Spain	Sergii Klippert; Ukraine
400 m freestyle S13	Ihar Boki; Belarus	Danylo Chufarov; Ukraine	Aleksandr Golintovskii; Russia
50 m backstroke S1	Hennadii Boiko; Ukraine	Christos Tampaxis; Greece	Oleksandr Golovko; Ukraine
50 m backstroke S2	Yang Yang; China	Aristeidis Makrodimitris; Greece	Dmitry Kokarev; Russia
50 m backstroke S3	Min Byeong-Eon; South Korea	Dmytro Vynohradets; Ukraine	Du Jianping; China
50 m backstroke S4	Juan Reyes; Mexico	Aleksei Lyzhikhin; Russia	Gustavo Sanchez Martinez; Mexico
50 m backstroke S5	Daniel Dias; Brazil	Junquan He; China	Zsolt Vereczkei; Hungary
100 m backstroke S6	Tao Zheng; China	Hongguang Jia; China	Sebastian Iwanow; Germany
100 m backstroke S7	Jonathan Fox; Great Britain	Yevheniy Bohodayko; Ukraine	Mihovil Spanja; Croatia
100 m backstroke S8	Konstantin Lisenkov; Russia	Denis Tarasov; Russia	Oliver Hynd; Great Britain
100 m backstroke S9	Matthew Cowdrey; Australia	James Crisp; Great Britain	Xiaobing Liu; China
100 m backstroke S10	Justin Zook; United States	André Brasil; Brazil	Benoit Huot; Canada
100 m backstroke S11	Dmytro Zalevskyi; Ukraine	Bozun Yang; China	Viktor Smyrnov; Ukraine
100 m backstroke S12	Aleksandr Nevolin-Svetov; Russia	Tucker Dupree; United States	Sergii Klippert; Ukraine
100 m backstroke S13	Ihar Boki; Belarus	Charl Bouwer; South Africa	Charalampos Taiganidis; Greece
100 m backstroke S14	Marc Evers; Netherlands	Aaron Moores; Great Britain	Kai Lun Au; Hong Kong
50 m breaststroke SB2	Jianping Du; China	Arnulfo Castorena; Mexico	Dmytro Vynohradets; Ukraine
50 m breaststroke SB3	Michael Schoenmaker; Netherlands	Miguel Luque; Spain	Takayuki Suzuki; Japan
100 m breaststroke SB4	Daniel Dias; Brazil	Moisés Fuentes; Colombia	Ricardo Ten; Spain
100 m breaststroke SB5	Woo-Geun Lim; South Korea	Niels Grunenberg; Germany	Pedro Rangel; Mexico
100 m breaststroke SB6	Yevheniy Bohodayko; Ukraine	Torben Schmidtke; Germany	Christoph Burkard; Germany
100 m breaststroke SB7	Blake Cochrane; Australia	Tomotaro Nakamura; Japan	Matt Levy; Australia
100 m breaststroke SB8	Andriy Kalyna; Ukraine	Matthew Cowdrey; Australia	Maurice Deelen; Netherlands
100 m breaststroke SB9	Pavel Poltavtsev; Russia	Kevin Paul; South Africa	Lin Furong; China
100 m breaststroke SB11	Bozun Yang; China	Keiichi Kimura; Japan	Oleksandr Mashchenko; Ukraine
100 m breaststroke SB12	Mikhail Zimin; Russia	Uladzimir Izotau; Belarus	Maksym Veraksa; Ukraine
100 m breaststroke SB13	Oleksii Feydina; Ukraine	Daniel Sharp; New Zealand	Roman Dubovoy; Russia
100 m breaststroke SB14	Yasuhiro Tanaka; Japan	Artem Pavlenko; Russia	Marc Evers; Netherlands
50 m butterfly S5	Daniel Dias; Brazil	Roy Perkins; United States	Junquan He; China
50 m butterfly S6	Qing Xu; China	Tao Zheng; China	Kyosuke Oyama; Japan
50 m butterfly S7	Shiyun Pan; China	Yevheniy Bohodayko; Ukraine	Jingang Wang; China
100 m butterfly S8	Charles Rozoy; France	Yanpeng Wei; China	Maodang Song; China
100 m butterfly S9	Tamás Sors; Hungary	Matthew Cowdrey; Australia	Federico Morlacchi; Italy
100 m butterfly S10	André Brasil; Brazil	Dmitry Grigorev; Russia	Achmat Hassiem; South Africa
100 m butterfly S11	Viktor Smyrnov; Ukraine	Enhamed Enhamed; Spain	Keiichi Kimura; Japan
100 m butterfly S12	Roman Makarov; Russia	Sergey Punko; Russia	James Clegg; Great Britain
100 m butterfly S13	Ihar Boki; Belarus	Roman Dubovoy; Russia	Tim Antalfy; Australia
150 m individual medley SM3	Jianping Du; China	Dmytroz Vynohradets; Ukraine	Hanhua Li; China
150 m individual medley SM4	Cameron Leslie; New Zealand	Gustavo Sanchez Martinez; Mexico	Takayuki Suzuki; Japan
200 m individual medley SM6	Qing Xu; China	Sascha Kindred; Great Britain	Tao Zheng; China
200 m individual medley SM7	Yevheniy Bohodayko; Ukraine	Rudy Garcia-Tolson; United States	Matt Levy; Australia
200 m individual medley SM8	Oliver Hynd; Great Britain	Jiachao Wang; China	Maurice Deelen; Netherlands
200 m individual medley SM9	Matthew Cowdrey; Australia	Andriy Kalyna; Ukraine	Federico Morlacchi; Italy
200 m individual medley SM10	Benoit Huot; Canada	André Brasil; Brazil	Rick Pendleton; Australia
200 m individual medley SM11	Yang Bozun; China	Viktor Smyrnov; Ukraine	Oleksandr Mashchenko; Ukraine
200 m individual medley SM12	Maksym Veraksa; Ukraine	Aleksandr Nevolin-Svetov; Russia	Sergey Punko; Russia
200 m individual medley SM13	Ihar Boki; Belarus	Roman Dubovoy; Russia	Danylo Chufarov; Ukraine
4×100 m freestyle 34pts	Australia (AUS); Andrew Pasterfield; Matt Levy; Blake Cochrane; Matthew Cowdrey	China (CHN); Song Maodang; Wang Jiachao; Lin Furong; Wang Yinan	Russia (RUS); Konstantin Lisenkov; Evgeny Zimin; Denis Tarasov; Dmitry Grigorev
4×100 m medley 34pts	China (CHN); Liu Xiaobing; Lin Furong; Wei Yanpeng; Wang Yinan	Russia (RUS); Konstantin Lisenkov; Pavel Poltavtsev; Eduard Samarin; Denis Tarasov	Australia (AUS); Michael Anderson; Matthew Cowdrey; Brenden Hall; Matt Levy

=== Women's events ===
Event	Gold	Silver	Bronze
50 m freestyle S3	Jiangbo Xia; China	Olga Sviderska; Ukraine	Patricia Valle; Mexico
50 m freestyle S5	Nataliia Prologaieva; Ukraine	Teresa Perales; Spain	Inbal Pezaro; Israel
50 m freestyle S6	Mirjam de Koning-Peper; Netherlands	Victoria Arlen; United States	Eleanor Simmonds; Great Britain
50 m freestyle S7	Jacqueline Freney; Australia	Cortney Jordan; United States	Ani Palian; Ukraine
50 m freestyle S8	Mallory Weggemann; United States	Maddison Elliott; Australia	Shengnan Jiang; China
50 m freestyle S9	Ping Lin; China	Louise Watkin; Great Britain	Ellie Cole; Australia
50 m freestyle S10	Summer Ashley Mortimer; Canada	Sophie Pascoe; New Zealand	Elodie Lorandi; France
50 m freestyle S11	Cecilia Camellini; Italy	Guizhi Li; China	Mary Fisher; New Zealand
50 m freestyle S12	Oxana Savchenko; Russia	Natali Pronina; Azerbaijan	Darya Stukalova; Russia
50 m freestyle S13	Kelley Becherer; United States	Valerie Grand-Maison; Canada	Prue Watt; Australia
100 m freestyle S3	Jiangbo Xia; China	Olga Sviderska; Ukraine	Patricia Valle; Mexico
100 m freestyle S5	Teresa Perales; Spain	Nataliia Prologaieva; Ukraine	Inbal Pezaro; Israel
100 m freestyle S6	Victoria Arlen; United States	Eleanor Simmonds; Great Britain	Tanja Gröpper; Germany
100 m freestyle S7	Jacqueline Freney; Australia	Cortney Jordan; United States	Susannah Rodgers; Great Britain
100 m freestyle S8	Jessica Long; United States	Heather Frederiksen; Great Britain	Maddison Elliott; Australia
100 m freestyle S9	Ellie Cole; Australia	Natalie du Toit; South Africa	Sarai Gascón Moreno; Spain
100 m freestyle S10	Sophie Pascoe; New Zealand	Elodie Lorandi; France	Summer Ashley Mortimer; Canada
100 m freestyle S11	Cecilia Camellini; Italy	Mary Fisher; New Zealand	Guizhi Li; China
100 m freestyle S12	Oxana Savchenko; Russia	Natali Pronina; Azerbaijan	Darya Stukalova; Russia
100 m freestyle S13	Kelley Becherer; United States	Valerie Grand-Maison; Canada	Rebecca Meyers; United States
200 m freestyle S5	Sarah Louise Rung; Norway	Teresa Perales; Spain	Inbal Pezaro; Israel
200 m freestyle S14	Jessica-Jane Applegate; Great Britain	Taylor Corry; Australia	Marlou van der Kulk; Netherlands
400 m freestyle S6	Eleanor Simmonds; Great Britain	Victoria Arlen; United States	Lingling Song; China
400 m freestyle S7	Jacqueline Freney; Australia	Cortney Jordan; United States	Susannah Rodgers; Great Britain
400 m freestyle S8	Jessica Long; United States	Heather Frederiksen; Great Britain	Maddison Elliott; Australia
400 m freestyle S9	Natalie du Toit; South Africa	Stephanie Millward; Great Britain	Ellie Cole; Australia
400 m freestyle S10	Elodie Lorandi; France	Aurelie Rivard; Canada	Susan Beth Scott; United States
400 m freestyle S11	Daniela Schulte; Germany	Amber Thomas; Canada	Cecilia Camellini; Italy
400 m freestyle S12	Oxana Savchenko; Russia	Hannah Russell; Great Britain	Deborah Font; Spain
50 m backstroke S2	Yazhu Feng; China	Ganna Ielisavetska; Ukraine	Iryna Sotska; Ukraine
50 m backstroke S4	Lisette Teunissen; Netherlands	Edenia Garcia; Brazil	Juan Bai; China
100 m backstroke S6	Lu Dong; China	Nyree Kindred; Great Britain	Mirjam De Koning-Peper; Netherlands
100 m backstroke S7	Jacqueline Freney; Australia	Kirsten Bruhn; Germany	Cortney Jordan; United States
100 m backstroke S8	Heather Frederiksen; Great Britain	Jessica Long; United States	Olesya Vladykina; Russia
100 m backstroke S9	Ellie Cole; Australia	Stephanie Millward; Great Britain	Elizabeth Stone; United States
100 m backstroke S10	Summer Ashley Mortimer; Canada	Sophie Pascoe; New Zealand	Shireen Sapiro; South Africa
100 m backstroke S11	Rina Akiyama; Japan	Mary Fisher; New Zealand	Cecilia Camellini; Italy
100 m backstroke S12	Oxana Savchenko; Russia	Natali Pronina; Azerbaijan	Hannah Russell; Great Britain
100 m backstroke S14	Bethany Firth; Ireland	Taylor Corry; Australia	Marlou van der Kulk; Netherlands
100 m breaststroke SB4	Nataliia Prologaieva; Ukraine	Sarah Louise Rung; Norway	Teresa Perales; Spain
100 m breaststroke SB5	Kirsten Bruhn; Germany	Lingling Song; China	Noga Nir-Kistler; United States
100 m breaststroke SB6	Viktoriia Savtsova; Ukraine	Charlotte Henshaw; Great Britain	Elizabeth Johnson; Great Britain
100 m breaststroke SB7	Jessica Long; United States	Oksana Khrul; Ukraine	Lisa den Braber; Netherlands
100 m breaststroke SB8	Olesya Vladykina; Russia	Claire Cashmore; Great Britain	Paulina Woźniak; Poland
100 m breaststroke SB9	Khrystyna Yurchenko; Ukraine	Sophie Pascoe; New Zealand	Harriet Lee; Great Britain
100 m breaststroke SB11	Maja Reichard; Sweden	Yana Berezhna; Ukraine	Nadia Báez; Argentina
100 m breaststroke SB12	Natali Pronina; Azerbaijan	Karolina Pelendritou; Cyprus	Yaryna Matlo; Ukraine
100 m breaststroke SB13	Prue Watt; Australia	Elena Krawzow; Germany	Kelley Becherer; United States
100 m breaststroke SB14	Michelle Alonso Morales; Spain	Magda Toeters; Netherlands	Shu Hang Leung; Hong Kong
50 m butterfly S5	Sarah Louise Rung; Norway	Teresa Perales; Spain	Joana Maria Silva; Brazil
50 m butterfly S6	Oksana Khrul; Ukraine	Dong Lu; China	Fuying Jiang; China
50 m butterfly S7	Jacqueline Freney; Australia	Brianna Nelson; Canada	Min Huang; China
100 m butterfly S8	Jessica Long; United States	Kateryna Istomina; Ukraine	Shengnan Jiang; China
100 m butterfly S9	Natalie du Toit; South Africa	Sarai Gascón Moreno; Spain	Elizabeth Stone; United States
100 m butterfly S10	Sophie Pascoe; New Zealand	Oliwia Jablonska; Poland	Elodie Lorandi; France
100 m butterfly S12	Joanna Mendak; Poland	Darya Stukalova; Russia	Hannah Russell; Great Britain
200 m individual medley SM5	Nataliia Prologaieva; Ukraine	Sarah Louise Rung; Norway	Teresa Perales; Spain
200 m individual medley SM6	Eleanor Simmonds; Great Britain	Verena Schott; Germany	Natalie Jones; Great Britain
200 m individual medley SM7	Jacqueline Freney; Australia	Brianna Nelson; Canada	Min Huang; China
200 m individual medley SM8	Jessica Long; United States	Olesya Vladykina; Russia	Shengnan Jiang; China
200 m individual medley SM9	Natalie du Toit; South Africa	Stephanie Millward; Great Britain	Louise Watkin; Great Britain
200 m individual medley SM10	Sophie Pascoe; New Zealand	Summer Ashley Mortimer; Canada	Meng Zhang; China
200 m individual medley SM11	Mary Fisher; New Zealand	Daniela Schulte; Germany	Amber Thomas; Canada
200 m individual medley SM12	Oxana Savchenko; Russia	Natali Pronina; Azerbaijan	Darya Stukalova; Russia
200 m individual medley SM13	Valerie Grand-Maison; Canada	Rebecca Anne Meyers; United States	Kelley Becherer; United States
4×100 m freestyle 34pts	Australia (AUS); Ellie Cole; Maddison Elliott; Katherine Downie; Jacqueline Freney	United States (USA); Susan Beth Scott; Victoria Arlen; Jessica Long; Anna Eames	Great Britain (GBR); Stephanie Millward; Claire Cashmore; Susannah Rodgers; Louise Watkin
4×100 m medley 34pts	Australia (AUS); Ellie Cole; Katherine Downie; Annabelle Williams; Jacqueline Freney	Great Britain (GBR); Heather Frederiksen; Claire Cashmore; Stephanie Millward; Louise Watkin	United States (USA); Susan Beth Scott; Anna Johannes; Jessica Long; Mallory Weggemann
