= Swimming at the 2012 Summer Paralympics – Men's 200 metre individual medley SM13 =

Event at the 2012 Summer Paralympics

Men's 200m Ind. Medley SM13 at the XIV Paralympic Games
- Venue: London Aquatics Centre
- Dates: 7 September 2012
- Competitors: 12 from 8 nations
- Winning time: 2:06.30

Medalists
1st place, gold medalist(s)		Ihar Boki	Belarus
2nd place, silver medalist(s)		Roman Dubovoy	Russia
3rd place, bronze medalist(s)		Danylo Chufarov	Ukraine

The men's 200m ind. medley SM13 event at the 2012 Summer Paralympics took place at the London Aquatics Centre on 7 September. There were two heats; the swimmers with the eight fastest times advanced to the final.

== Results ==
=== Heats ===
Competed from 11:29.

==== Heat 1 ====
Rank	Lane	Name	Nationality	Time	Notes
1	3	Roman Dubovoy	Russia	2:13.81	Q, PR
2	5	Danylo Chufarov	Ukraine	2:15.51	Q
3	4	Dzmitry Salei	Belarus	2:16.00	Q
4	6	Stepan Smagin	Russia	2:20.99	Q
5	2	Edgar Quirós Baltanas	Spain	2:27.59	
6	7	Carlos Farrenberg	Brazil	2:28.38	

==== Heat 2 ====
Rank	Lane	Name	Nationality	Time	Notes
1	4	Ihar Boki	Belarus	2:09.89	Q, WR
2	5	Charles Bouwer	South Africa	2:15.28	Q
3	3	Oleksii Fedyna	Ukraine	2:17.96	Q
4	6	Sean Russo	Australia	2:18.46	Q, OC
5	7	Anton Ganzha	Ukraine	2:27.68	
6	2	Devin Gotell	Canada	2:27.88	

=== Final ===
Competed at 20:16.

Rank	Lane	Name	Nationality	Time	Notes
1st place, gold medalist(s)	4	Ihar Boki	Belarus	2:06.30	WR
2nd place, silver medalist(s)	5	Roman Dubovoy	Russia	2:10.16	
3rd place, bronze medalist(s)	6	Danylo Chufarov	Ukraine	2:10.22	
4	3	Charles Bouwer	South Africa	2:14.71	
5	2	Dzmitry Salei	Belarus	2:14.96	
6	8	Stepan Smagin	Russia	2:16.50	
7	7	Oleksii Fedyna	Ukraine	2:17.29	
8	1	Sean Russo	Australia	2:17.80	OC

Q = qualified for final. WR = World Record. PR = Paralympic Record. OC = Oceania Record.
