= Swimming at the 2016 Summer Paralympics – Men's 100 metre freestyle S13 =

Men's 100 metre freestyle S13 at the XV Paralympic Games
- Venue: Olympic Aquatics Stadium
- Dates: 16 September 2016
- Competitors: 22 from 12 nations

Medalists
1st place, gold medalist(s)		Ihar Boki	Belarus
2nd place, silver medalist(s)		Iaroslav Denysenko	Ukraine
3rd place, bronze medalist(s)		Maksym Veraksa	Ukraine

The Men's 100 metre freestyle S13 event at the 2016 Paralympic Games took place on 16 September 2016, at the Olympic Aquatics Stadium. Three heats were held. The swimmers with the eight fastest times advanced to the final.

== Heats ==
=== Heat 1 ===
10:57 16 September 2016:

Rank	Lane	Name	Nationality	Time	Notes
1	4	Maksym Veraksa	Ukraine	53.18	Q
2	3	Carlos Farrenberg	Brazil	53.63	Q
3	5	Braedan Jason	Australia	53.90	Q
4	6	Illia Yaremenko	Ukraine	55.21	
5	2	Ivan Salguero Oteiza	Spain	56.29	
6	7	Guilherme Silva	Brazil	57.96	
7	1	Diego Fernando Cuesta Martinez	Colombia	59.37	

=== Heat 2 ===
11:00 16 September 2016:

Rank	Lane	Name	Nationality	Time	Notes
1	4	Iaroslav Denysenko	Ukraine	53.41	Q
2	5	Raman Salei	Azerbaijan	54.32	
3	6	Dmitriy Horlin	Uzbekistan	55.12	
4	3	Stephen Clegg	Great Britain	55.85	
5	7	Thomaz Matera	Brazil	56.10	
6	2	Sean Russo	Australia	56.39	
7	1	Kamil Rzetelski	Poland	58.20	

=== Heat 3 ===
11:03 16 September 2016:

Rank	Lane	Name	Nationality	Time	Notes
1	4	Ihar Boki	Belarus	51.45	PR Q
2	3	Sergii Klippert	Ukraine	53.69	Q
3	5	Dzmitry Salei	Azerbaijan	53.82	Q
4	6	Muzaffar Tursunkhujaev	Uzbekistan	53.85	Q
5	2	Jacob Templeton	Australia	55.92	
6	1	Anuar Akhmetov	Kazakhstan	56.63	
7	7	Roman Agalakov	Kazakhstan	57.72	
8	8	Tyler Mrak	Canada	1:00.01	

== Final ==
19:24 16 September 2016:

Rank	Lane	Name	Nationality	Time	Notes
1st place, gold medalist(s)	4	Ihar Boki	Belarus	50.90	PR
2nd place, silver medalist(s)	3	Iaroslav Denysenko	Ukraine	52.40	
3rd place, bronze medalist(s)	5	Maksym Veraksa	Ukraine	52.77	
4	2	Sergii Klippert	Ukraine	53.64	
5	6	Carlos Farrenberg	Brazil	53.81	
6	1	Muzaffar Tursunkhujaev	Uzbekistan	53.90	
7	8	Braedan Jason	Australia	54.04	
8	7	Dzmitry Salei	Azerbaijan	54.73	
