= Swimming at the 2012 Summer Paralympics – Men's 400 metre freestyle S13 =

Event at the 2012 Summer Paralympics

Men's 400m Freestyle S13 at the XIV Paralympic Games
- Venue: London Aquatics Centre
- Dates: 4 September 2012
- Competitors: 10 from 8 nations
- Winning time: 3:58.78

Medalists
1st place, gold medalist(s)		Ihar Boki	Belarus
2nd place, silver medalist(s)		Danylo Chufarov	Ukraine
3rd place, bronze medalist(s)		Aleksandr Golintovskii	Russia

The men's 400m freestyle S13 event at the 2012 Summer Paralympics took place at the London Aquatics Centre on 4 September. There were two heats; the swimmers with the eight fastest times advanced to the final.

== Results ==
=== Heats ===
Competed from 11:51.

==== Heat 1 ====
Rank	Lane	Name	Nationality	Time	Notes
1	4	Charles Bouwer	South Africa	4:17.74	Q
2	5	Aleksandr Golintovskii	Russia	4:19.69	Q
3	3	Devin Gotell	Canada	4:23.84	Q
4	6	Stepan Smagin	Russia	4:28.37	Q
5	2	Anton Ganzha	Ukraine	4:35.61	

==== Heat 2 ====
Rank	Lane	Name	Nationality	Time	Notes
1	4	Ihar Boki	Belarus	4:02.83	Q, WR
2	5	Danylo Chufarov	Ukraine	4:15.24	Q
3	3	Daniel Holt	New Zealand	4:17.63	Q, OC
4	6	Sean Russo	Australia	4:22.83	Q
5	2	Carlos Farrenberg	Brazil	4:37.22	

=== Final ===
Competed at 20:45.

Rank	Lane	Name	Nationality	Time	Notes
1st place, gold medalist(s)	4	Ihar Boki	Belarus	3:58.78	WR
2nd place, silver medalist(s)	5	Danylo Chufarov	Ukraine	4:05.85	
3rd place, bronze medalist(s)	2	Aleksandr Golintovskii	Russia	4:11.13	
4	3	Daniel Holt	New Zealand	4:12.66	OC
5	6	Charles Bouwer	South Africa	4:14.13	
6	7	Sean Russo	Australia	4:18.25	
7	1	Devin Gotell	Canada	4:20.43	
8	8	Stepan Smagin	Russia	4:27.31	

Q = qualified for final. WR = World Record. OC = Oceania Record.
