= Swimming at the 2016 Summer Paralympics – Men's 200 metre individual medley =

The men's 200 metre individual medley swimming events for the 2016 Summer Paralympics took place at the Olympic Aquatics Stadium from 8 to 17 September. A total of eleven events were contested for different classifications.

== Competition format ==
Each event consisted of two rounds: heats and final. The top eight swimmers overall in the heats progressed to the final. If there were less than eight swimmers in an event, no heats were held and all swimmers qualify for the final.

== Results ==
=== SM6 ===
19:31 12 September 2016:

Rank	Lane	Name	Nationality	Time	Notes
1st place, gold medalist(s)	3	Sascha Kindred	Great Britain	2:38.47	WR
2nd place, silver medalist(s)	2	Hongguang Jia	China	2:39.47	
3rd place, bronze medalist(s)	6	Talisson Glock	Brazil	2:41.39	
4	7	Qing Xu	China	2:42.57	
5	5	Hong Yang	China	2:42.92	
6	8	Iaroslav Semenenko	Ukraine	2:54.74	
7	1	Yoav Valinsky	Israel	2:59.08	
	4	Nelson Crispín	Colombia		DSQ

=== SM7 ===
17:52 13 September 2016:

Rank	Lane	Name	Nationality	Time	Notes
1st place, gold medalist(s)	3	Ievgenii Bogodaiko	Ukraine	2:30.72	WR
2nd place, silver medalist(s)	5	Rudy Garcia-Tolson	United States	2:33.87	
3rd place, bronze medalist(s)	6	Matthew Levy	Australia	2:36.99	
4	4	Carlos Serrano Zárate	Colombia	2:37.08	
5	1	Jingang Wang	China	2:38.30	
6	2	Tobias Pollap	Germany	2:45.40	
7	7	Valerio Taras	Italy	2:47.27	
8	8	Andreas Skaar Bjornstad	Norway	2:48.06	

=== SM8 ===
17:43 17 September 2016:

Rank	Lane	Name	Nationality	Time	Notes
1st place, gold medalist(s)	4	Oliver Hynd	Great Britain	2:20.01	WR
2nd place, silver medalist(s)	5	Maodang Song	China	2:20.79	
3rd place, bronze medalist(s)	6	Haijiao Xu	China	2:21.19	
4	3	Robert Griswold	United States	2:26.99	
5	7	Guanglong Yang	China	2:27.87	
6	2	Jesse Aungles	Australia	2:28.96	
7	1	Niels Mortensen	Denmark	2:29.77	
8	8	Charles Rozoy	France	2:33.82	

=== SM9 ===
17:45 11 September 2016:

Rank	Lane	Name	Nationality	Time	Notes
1st place, gold medalist(s)	3	Federico Morlacchi	Italy	2:16.72	
2nd place, silver medalist(s)	5	Tamás Sors	Hungary	2:17.33	
3rd place, bronze medalist(s)	4	Timothy Disken	Australia	2:17.72	
4	6	Tamás Tóth	Hungary	2:19.40	
5	7	Timothy Hodge	Australia	2:21.14	
6	8	Cody Bureau	United States	2:24.63	
7	1	James Crisp	Great Britain	2:24.96	
	2	Brenden Hall	Australia		DSQ

=== SM10 ===
18:59 11 September 2016:

Rank	Lane	Name	Nationality	Time	Notes
1st place, gold medalist(s)	4	Denys Dubrov	Ukraine	2:06.87	WR
2nd place, silver medalist(s)	5	Maksym Krypak	Ukraine	2:08.10	
3rd place, bronze medalist(s)	3	Dmytro Vanzenko	Ukraine	2:10.48	
4	2	Benoit Huot	Canada	2:11.85	
5	6	Olivier van de Voort	Netherlands	2:13.72	
6	7	Kevin Paul	South Africa	2:16.25	
7	8	Sven Decaesstecker	Belgium	2:16.94	
8	1	Isaac Bouckley	Canada	2:17.33	

=== SM11 ===
18:51 16 September 2016:

Rank	Lane	Name	Nationality	Time	Notes
1st place, gold medalist(s)	4	Israel Oliver	Spain	2:24.11	
2nd place, silver medalist(s)	5	Viktor Smyrnov	Ukraine	2:26.57	
3rd place, bronze medalist(s)	2	Bozun Yang	China	2:27.82	
4	7	Keiichi Kimura	Japan	2:28.76	
5	3	Hryhory Zudzilau	Belarus	2:30.72	
6	6	Chenquan Lou	China	2:32.42	
7	8	Oleksandr Mashchenko	Ukraine	2:33.76	
8	1	Tharon Drake	United States	2:35.08	

=== SM13 ===
18:54 10 September 2016:

Rank	Lane	Name	Nationality	Time	Notes
1st place, gold medalist(s)	4	Ihar Boki	Belarus	2:04.02	PR
2nd place, silver medalist(s)	5	Iaroslav Denysenko	Ukraine	2:08.76	
3rd place, bronze medalist(s)	3	Danylo Chufarov	Ukraine	2:11.12	PR
4	6	Dzmitry Salei	Azerbaijan	2:13.83	
5	1	Dmitriy Horlin	Uzbekistan	2:15.18	
6	7	Sean Russo	Australia	2:16.29	
7	2	Sergii Klippert	Ukraine	2:16.47	
8	8	Jacob Templeton	Australia	2:20.90	

=== SM14 ===
19:51 17 September 2016:

Rank	Lane	Name	Nationality	Time	Notes
1st place, gold medalist(s)	4	Marc Evers	Netherlands	2:10.29	PR
2nd place, silver medalist(s)	3	Thomas Hamer	Great Britain	2:12.88	
3rd place, bronze medalist(s)	5	Keichi Nakajima	Japan	2:15.46	
4	6	Won Sang Cho	South Korea	2:17.76	
5	2	Takuya Tsugawa	Japan	2:18.03	
6	1	Jon Margeir Sverrisson	Iceland	2:18.61	
7	7	Liam Schluter	Australia	2:18.85	
8	8	Gordie Michie	Canada	2:18.88	
