= Swimming at the 2012 Summer Paralympics – Men's 100 metre breaststroke SB13 =

Event at the 2012 Summer Paralympics

Men's 100m Breaststroke SB13 at the XIV Paralympic Games
- Venue: London Aquatics Centre
- Dates: 8 September 2012
- Competitors: 9 from 6 nations
- Winning time: 1:04.30

Medalists
1st place, gold medalist(s)		Oleksii Fedyna	Ukraine
2nd place, silver medalist(s)		Daniel Sharp	New Zealand
3rd place, bronze medalist(s)		Roman Dubovoy	Russia

The men's 100m breaststroke SB13 event at the 2012 Summer Paralympics took place at the London Aquatics Centre on 8 September. There were two heats; the swimmers with the eight fastest times advanced to the final.

== Results ==
=== Heats ===
Competed from 10:43.

==== Heat 1 ====
Rank	Lane	Name	Nationality	Time	Notes
1	5	Daniel Sharp	New Zealand	1:08.43	Q, OC
2	3	Edgar Quirós Baltanas	Spain	1:09.30	Q
3	4	Maksym Zavodnyy	Ukraine	1:09.31	Q
4	6	Ihar Boki	Belarus	1:11.17	Q

==== Heat 2 ====
Rank	Lane	Name	Nationality	Time	Notes
1	4	Oleksii Fedyna	Ukraine	1:05.12	Q
2	3	Roman Dubovoy	Russia	1:08.16	Q
3	5	Dzmitry Salei	Belarus	1:10.09	Q
4	6	Danylo Chufarov	Ukraine	1:15.12	Q
5	2	Sean Russo	Australia	1:16.81	

=== Final ===
Competed at 18:57.

Rank	Lane	Name	Nationality	Time	Notes
1st place, gold medalist(s)	4	Oleksii Fedyna	Ukraine	1:04.30	PR
2nd place, silver medalist(s)	3	Daniel Sharp	New Zealand	1:06.72	OC
3rd place, bronze medalist(s)	5	Roman Dubovoy	Russia	1:07.06	
4	7	Dzmitry Salei	Belarus	1:07.54	
5	2	Maksym Zavodnyy	Ukraine	1:08.05	
6	6	Edgar Quirós Baltanas	Spain	1:08.06	
7	1	Ihar Boki	Belarus	1:08.98	
8	8	Danylo Chufarov	Ukraine	1:15.05	

Q = qualified for final. PR = Paralympic Record. OC = Oceania Record.
