= Swimming at the 2012 Summer Paralympics – Men's 100 metre backstroke S13 =

Event at the 2012 Summer Paralympics

Men's 100m Backstroke S13 at the XIV Paralympic Games
- Venue: London Aquatics Centre
- Dates: 3 September 2012
- Competitors: 13 from 9 nations
- Winning time: 56.97

Medalists
1st place, gold medalist(s)		Ihar Boki	Belarus
2nd place, silver medalist(s)		Charles Bouwer	South Africa
3rd place, bronze medalist(s)		Charalampos Taiganidis	Greece

The men's 100m backstroke S13 event at the 2012 Summer Paralympics took place at the London Aquatics Centre on 3 September. There were two heats; the swimmers with the eight fastest times advanced to the final.

== Results ==
=== Heats ===
Competed from 11:26.

==== Heat 1 ====
Rank	Lane	Name	Nationality	Time	Notes
1	4	Charles Bouwer	South Africa	1:01.16	Q
2	5	Sean Russo	Australia	1:01.98	Q, OC
3	6	Antti Antero Latikka	Finland	1:04.33	Q
4	3	Brian Hill	Canada	1:04.93	Q
5	2	Oleksii Fedyna	Ukraine	1:05.62	Q
6	7	Devin Gotell	Canada	1:06.62	

==== Heat 2 ====
Rank	Lane	Name	Nationality	Time	Notes
1	4	Ihar Boki	Belarus	58.19	Q, WR
2	5	Charalampos Taiganidis	Greece	1:01.95	Q
3	2	Tim Antalfy	Australia	1:04.26	Q
4	7	Aleksandr Golintovskii	Russia	1:06.68	
5	6	Anton Ganzha	Ukraine	1:07.19	
6	1	Kirill Pankov	Uzbekistan	1:07.77	AS
7	3	Danylo Chufarov	Ukraine	1:15.53	

=== Final ===
Competed at 19:39.

Rank	Lane	Name	Nationality	Time	Notes
1st place, gold medalist(s)	4	Ihar Boki	Belarus	56.97	WR
2nd place, silver medalist(s)	5	Charles Bouwer	South Africa	59.92	AF
3rd place, bronze medalist(s)	3	Charalampos Taiganidis	Greece	1:01.10	
4	6	Sean Russo	Australia	1:02.59	
5	2	Tim Antalfy	Australia	1:04.03	
6	8	Oleksii Fedyna	Ukraine	1:04.77	
7	1	Brian Hill	Canada	1:04.97	
8	7	Antti Antero Latikka	Finland	1:05.89	

Q = qualified for final. WR = World Record. AS = Asian Record. AF = African Record. OC = Oceania Record.
