= Swimming at the 2012 Summer Paralympics – Men's 100 metre butterfly S13 =

Event at the 2012 Summer Paralympics

Men's 100m Butterfly S13 at the XIV Paralympic Games
- Venue: London Aquatics Centre
- Dates: 31 August 2012
- Competitors: 11 from 8 nations
- Winning time: 55.50

Medalists
1st place, gold medalist(s)		Ihar Boki	Belarus
2nd place, silver medalist(s)		Roman Dubovoy	Russia
3rd place, bronze medalist(s)		Tim Antalfy	Australia

The men's 100m butterfly S13 event at the 2012 Summer Paralympics took place at the London Aquatics Centre on 31 August. There were two heats; the swimmers with the seven fastest times advanced to the final, while because of tied times in the heats the eighth final place was decided by a swim-off.

== Results ==
=== Heats ===
Competed from 11:30. Qualification swim-off at 12.05.

==== Heat 1 ====
Rank	Lane	Name	Nationality	Time	Notes
1	4	Ihar Boki	Belarus	57.06	Q, PR
2	5	Charles Bouwer	South Africa	59.03	Q, AF
3	6	Kirill Pankov	Uzbekistan	59.62	Q, AS
4	3	Danylo Chufarov	Ukraine	59.92	Q
5	2	Daniel Holt	New Zealand	1:02.77	

==== Heat 2 ====
Rank	Lane	Name	Nationality	Time	Notes
1	4	Tim Antalfy	Australia	56.03	Q, PR
2	3	Roman Dubovoy	Russia	58.15	Q
3	5	Dzmitry Salei	Belarus	58.27	Q
4	6	Sean Russo	Australia	1:01.61	Q (swim-off 1:01.24)
4	2	Brian Hill	Canada	1:01.61	(swim-off 1:02.72)
6	7	Aleksandr Golintovskii	Russia	1:03.26	

=== Final ===
Competed at 20:00.

Rank	Lane	Name	Nationality	Time	Notes
1st place, gold medalist(s)	5	Ihar Boki	Belarus	55.50	PR
2nd place, silver medalist(s)	3	Roman Dubovoy	Russia	56.37	
3rd place, bronze medalist(s)	4	Tim Antalfy	Australia	56.48	
4	1	Danylo Chufarov	Ukraine	58.05	
5	6	Dzmitry Salei	Belarus	58.47	
6	7	Kirill Pankov	Uzbekistan	59.37	AS
7	2	Charles Bouwer	South Africa	59.39	
8	8	Sean Russo	Australia	1:01.57	

Q = qualified for final. PR = Paralympic Record. AS = Asian Record. AF = African Record.
