= Swimming at the 2016 Summer Paralympics – Men's 400 metre freestyle S13 =

Men's 400 metre freestyle S13 at the XV Paralympic Games
- Venue: Olympic Aquatics Stadium
- Dates: 12 September 2016
- Competitors: 13 from 9 nations

Medalists
1st place, gold medalist(s)		Ihar Boki	Belarus
2nd place, silver medalist(s)		Iaroslav Denysenko	Ukraine
3rd place, bronze medalist(s)		Dmitriy Horlin	Uzbekistan

The Men's 400 metre freestyle S13 event at the 2016 Paralympic Games took place on 12 September 2016, at the Olympic Aquatics Stadium. Two heats were held. The swimmers with the eight fastest times advanced to the final.

== Heats ==
=== Heat 1 ===
9:30 12 September 2016:

Rank	Lane	Name	Nationality	Time	Notes
1	4	Iaroslav Denysenko	Ukraine	4:05.03	Q
2	5	Braedan Jason	Australia	4:15.59	Q
3	6	Jacob Templeton	Australia	4:19.11	Q
4	3	Stephen Clegg	Great Britain	4:23.07	
5	2	Devin Gotell	Canada	4:25.72	
6	7	Tyler Mrak	Canada	4:46.12	

=== Heat 2 ===
9:37 12 September 2016:

Rank	Lane	Name	Nationality	Time	Notes
1	4	Ihar Boki	Belarus	4:02.23	Q
2	5	Dmitriy Horlin	Uzbekistan	4:13.69	Q
3	6	Raman Salei	Azerbaijan	4:13.83	Q
4	3	Danylo Chufarov	Ukraine	4:17.39	Q
5	7	Thomaz Matera	Brazil	4:19.85	Q
6	2	Ivan Salguero Oteiza	Spain	4:25.10	
7	1	Liam Bekric	Australia	4:43.32	

== Final ==
17:30 12 September 2016:

Rank	Lane	Name	Nationality	Time	Notes
1st place, gold medalist(s)	4	Ihar Boki	Belarus	3:55.62	PR
2nd place, silver medalist(s)	5	Iaroslav Denysenko	Ukraine	3:58.78	
3rd place, bronze medalist(s)	3	Dmitriy Horlin	Uzbekistan	4:06.63	PR
4	7	Danylo Chufarov	Ukraine	4:10.92	
5	2	Braedan Jason	Australia	4:12.95	
6	1	Jacob Templeton	Australia	4:15.86	
7	6	Raman Salei	Azerbaijan	4:19.34	
8	8	Thomaz Matera	Brazil	4:19.62	
