= Belarus at the 2012 Summer Paralympics =

- IPC code: BLR
- NPC: Paralympic Committee of the Republic of Belarus

in London
- Competitors: 31 in 7 sports
- Medals Ranked 25th: Gold 5 Silver 2 Bronze 3 Total 10

Summer Paralympics appearances (overview)
- 1996; 2000; 2004; 2008; 2012; 2016; 2020; 2024

Other related appearances
- Soviet Union (1988); Unified Team (1992)

Belarus competed at the 2012 Summer Paralympics in London, United Kingdom from August 29 to September 9, 2012.

== Medalists ==
Medal	Name	Sport	Event	Date
Gold	Ihar Boki	Swimming	Men's 100 metre butterfly S13	August 31
Gold	Ihar Boki	Swimming	Men's 100 metre freestyle S13	September 2
Gold	Ihar Boki	Swimming	Men's 100 metre backstroke S13	September 3
Gold	Ihar Boki	Swimming	Men's 400 metre freestyle S13	September 4
Gold	Ihar Boki	Swimming	Men's 200 metre individual medley SM13	September 7
Silver	Ihar Boki	Swimming	Men's 50 metre freestyle S13	September 1
Silver	Uladzimir Izotau	Swimming	Men's 100 metre breaststroke SB12	September 8
Bronze	Aliaksandr Subota	Athletics	Men's triple jump F46	September 1
Bronze	Liudmila Vauchok	Rowing	Women's single sculls	September 2
Bronze	Anna Kaniuk	Athletics	Women's long jump F11/12	September 7

== Athletics ==
Men's Field Events

Athlete	Event	Final	
Athlete	Event	Distance	Rank
Ihar Fartunau	Long Jump F13	5.99	8
Aliaksandr Subota	Long Jump F46	6.06	8
Aliaksandr Subota	Triple Jump F46	14.00	3rd place, bronze medalist(s)
Siarhei Burdukou	Triple Jump F12	14.19	4
Siarhei Hrybanau	Shot Put F11-12	13.65	6

Women's Track and Road Events

Athlete	Event	Heat		Semifinal		Final	
Athlete	Event	Result	Rank	Result	Rank	Result	Rank
Anna Kaniuk	100m T12	12.97	11 q	13.22	4	Did not advance	
Volha Zinkevich	100m T12	12.78	8 q	12.85	2	Did not advance	
Volha Zinkevich	200m T12	26.97	8	Did not advance			

Women's Field Events

Athlete	Event	Final	
Athlete	Event	Distance	Rank
Anna Kaniuk	Long Jump F11-12	5.83	3rd place, bronze medalist(s)
Volha Zinkevich	Long Jump F11-12	5.52	7
Tamara Sivakova	Shot Put F11-12	12.39	6
Tamara Sivakova	Discus Throw F11-12	37.61	5

== Cycling ==
=== Road ===
Women

Athlete	Event	Time	Rank
Iryna Fiadotova; Alena Drazdova (Pilot)	Road Race B	DNF	
Iryna Fiadotova; Alena Drazdova (Pilot)	Time Trial B	38:21.40	11

=== Track ===
Individual Pursuit

Athlete	Event	Heats		Final	
Athlete	Event	Time	Rank	Time	Rank
Iryna Fiadotova; Alena Drazdova (Pilot)	Women's Individual Pursuit B	4:01.417	10	Did not advance	

== Judo ==
Athlete	Event	Round of 16	Quarterfinals	Semifinals	First Repechage Round	Repechage Semifinals	Final	
Athlete	Event	Opposition Result	Opposition Result	Opposition Result	Opposition Result	Opposition Result	Opposition Result	Rank
Aliaksandr Kazlou	Men's -73kg	Takahashi (JPN); L 0001-111	Did not advance					
Arina Kachan	Women's -70kg	—N/a	Szabo (HUN); L 0002-0211	Did not advance	—N/a	Bye	Bronze-medal match Zhou (CHN); L 0003-0221	5

== Powerlifting ==
Women

Athlete	Event	Result	Rank
Liudmila Hreben	+82.5kg	125.0	5

== Rowing ==
Athlete	Event	Heats		Repechage		Final	
Athlete	Event	Time	Rank	Time	Rank	Time	Rank
Liudmila Vauchok	Women's Single Sculls	5:40.21	1 FA	Bye		5:47.54	3rd place, bronze medalist(s)
Alena Aliaksandrovich; Maksim Miatlou	Mixed Double Sculls	4:28.32	5 R	4:38.62	5 FB	4:36.95	5
Pavel Herasimchyk; Aksana Sivitskaya; Ruslan Sivitski; Larisa Varona; Piotr Piatrynich (Cox)	Mixed Coxed Four	3:45.44	6 R	3:40.72	5 FB	3:45.18	6

== Swimming ==
Men

Athletes	Event	Heat		Final	
Athletes	Event	Time	Rank	Time	Rank
Uladzimir Izotau	50m freestyle S12	25.42	6 Q	24.99	5
Uladzimir Izotau	100m breaststroke SB12	1:07.72	1 Q	1:07.28	1st place, gold medalist(s)
Uladzimir Izotau	100m butterfly S12	1:02.89	9	Did not advance	
Ihar Boki	50m freestyle S13	24.26	1 Q	24.07	2nd place, silver medalist(s)
Ihar Boki	100m freestyle S13	52.08 WR	1 Q	51.91 WR	1st place, gold medalist(s)
Ihar Boki	400m freestyle S13	4:02.83 WR	1 Q	3:58.78 WR	1st place, gold medalist(s)
Ihar Boki	100m backstroke S13	58.19 WR	1 Q	56.97 WR	1st place, gold medalist(s)
Ihar Boki	100m breaststroke SB13	1:11.17	7 Q	1:08.98	7
Ihar Boki	100m butterfly S13	57.06 PR	2 Q	55.50 PR	1st place, gold medalist(s)
Ihar Boki	200m individual medley SM13	2:09.89 WR	1 Q	2:06.30 WR	1st place, gold medalist(s)
Dzmitry Salei	50m freestyle S13	24.33	3 Q	24.30	5
Dzmitry Salei	100m freestyle S13	53.78	5 Q	53.76	6
Dzmitry Salei	100m breaststroke SB13	1:10.09	6 Q	1:07.54	4
Dzmitry Salei	100m butterfly S13	58.27	4 Q	58.47	5
Dzmitry Salei	200m individual medley SM13	2:16.00	5 Q	2:14.96	5
Yury Rudzenok	100m breaststroke SB12	1:16.64	13	Did not advance	
Yury Rudzenok	100m butterfly S12	1:08.25	14	Did not advance	

Women

Athletes	Event	Heat		Final	
Athletes	Event	Time	Rank	Time	Rank
Maryia Charniatsova	50m freestyle S13	30.63	13	Did not advance	
Maryia Charniatsova	100m freestyle S13	1:10.56	14	Did not advance	
Natallia Shavel	100m breaststroke SB4	2:04.55	5 Q	2:00.03	5
Natallia Shavel	50m butterfly S5	47.01	3 Q	46.64	4
Natallia Shavel	200m individual medley SM5	3:51.37	4 Q	3:42.27	5

== Wheelchair Fencing ==
Men

Athlete	Event	Group stage			Round of 16	Quarterfinals	Semifinals	Final	
Athlete	Event	Opposition	Result	Rank	Opposition Result	Opposition Result	Opposition Result	Opposition Result	Rank
Mikalai Bezyazychny	Individual épée B	Mainville (CAN)	W 5-0	1 Q	—N/a	Kuzyukov (RUS); W 15-10	Tam C S (HKG); L 11-15	Bronze medal match Latreche (FRA); L 11-15	4
Mikalai Bezyazychny	Individual épée B	Silva Guissone (BRA)	W 5-1	1 Q	—N/a	Kuzyukov (RUS); W 15-10	Tam C S (HKG); L 11-15	Bronze medal match Latreche (FRA); L 11-15	4
Mikalai Bezyazychny	Individual épée B	Pluta (POL)	W 5-2	1 Q	—N/a	Kuzyukov (RUS); W 15-10	Tam C S (HKG); L 11-15	Bronze medal match Latreche (FRA); L 11-15	4
Mikalai Bezyazychny	Individual épée B	Kurzin (RUS)	W 5-4	1 Q	—N/a	Kuzyukov (RUS); W 15-10	Tam C S (HKG); L 11-15	Bronze medal match Latreche (FRA); L 11-15	4
Mikalai Bezyazychny	Individual foil B	Francois (FRA)	L 1-5	4	Did not advance				
Mikalai Bezyazychny	Individual foil B	Yusupov (RUS)	L 2-5	4	Did not advance				
Mikalai Bezyazychny	Individual foil B	Czop (POL)	L 4-5	4	Did not advance				
Mikalai Bezyazychny	Individual foil B	Palavecino (ARG)	W 5-0	4	Did not advance				
Viktar Lemiashkevich	Individual épée B	Cratere (FRA)	L 1-5	5	Did not advance				
Viktar Lemiashkevich	Individual épée B	Hu D (CHN)	L 4-5	5	Did not advance				
Viktar Lemiashkevich	Individual épée B	Kuzyukov (RUS)	L 3-5	5	Did not advance				
Viktar Lemiashkevich	Individual épée B	Chung T C (HKG)	W 5-3	5	Did not advance				
Martyn Kavalenia	Individual épée A	Duan (CHN)	L 1-5	5	Did not advance				
Martyn Kavalenia	Individual épée A	Noble (FRA)	L 3-5	5	Did not advance				
Martyn Kavalenia	Individual épée A	Stanczuk (POL)	L 2-5	5	Did not advance				
Martyn Kavalenia	Individual épée A	Mato (HUN)	L 4-5	5	Did not advance				

Women

Athlete	Event	Group stage			Quarterfinals	Semifinals	Final	
Athlete	Event	Opposition	Result	Rank	Opposition Result	Opposition Result	Opposition Result	Rank
Liudmila Lemiashkevich	Individual épée B	Chan Y C (HKG)	L 4-5	3 Q	Chan Y C (HKG); L 12-15	Did not advance		
Liudmila Lemiashkevich	Individual épée B	Pozniak (UKR)	L 1-3	3 Q	Chan Y C (HKG); L 12-15	Did not advance		
Liudmila Lemiashkevich	Individual épée B	Makowska (POL)	W 5-4	3 Q	Chan Y C (HKG); L 12-15	Did not advance		
Liudmila Lemiashkevich	Individual épée B	Demaude (FRA)	W 5-0	3 Q	Chan Y C (HKG); L 12-15	Did not advance		
Alesia Makrytskaya	Individual épée B	Briese-Baetke (GER)	L 4-5	5	Did not advance			
Alesia Makrytskaya	Individual épée B	Jana (THA)	L 3-5	5	Did not advance			
Alesia Makrytskaya	Individual épée B	Vasileva (RUS)	L 3-5	5	Did not advance			
Alesia Makrytskaya	Individual épée B	Dani (HUN)	W 5-4	5	Did not advance			
Alesia Makrytskaya	Individual épée B	Moore (GBR)	L 2-5	5	Did not advance			

== See also ==
- Belarus at the 2012 Summer Olympics
