= Swimming at the 2016 Summer Paralympics – Men's 100 metre backstroke S13 =

Men's 100 metre backstroke S13 at the XV Paralympic Games
- Venue: Olympic Aquatics Stadium
- Dates: 17 September 2016
- Competitors: 11 from 7 nations

Medalists
1st place, gold medalist(s)		Ihar Boki	Belarus
2nd place, silver medalist(s)		Iaroslav Denysenko	Ukraine
3rd place, bronze medalist(s)		Nicolas Guy Turbide	Canada

The Men's 100 metre backstroke S13 event at the 2016 Paralympic Games took place on 17 September 2016, at the Olympic Aquatics Stadium. Two heats were held. The swimmers with the eight fastest times advanced to the final.

== Heats ==
=== Heat 1 ===
10:35 17 September 2016:

Rank	Lane	Name	Nationality	Time	Notes
1	5	Kirill Pankov	Uzbekistan	1:01.21	Q
2	4	Iaroslav Denysenko	Ukraine	1:01.56	Q
3	3	Antti Latikka	Finland	1:01.93	Q
4	6	Muzaffar Tursunkhujaev	Uzbekistan	1:04.58	Q
5	2	Liam Bekric	Australia	1:07.47	

=== Heat 2 ===
10:39 17 September 2016:

Rank	Lane	Name	Nationality	Time	Notes
1	4	Ihar Boki	Belarus	56.82	PR Q
2	5	Nicolas Guy Turbide	Canada	59.93	Q
3	3	Sean Russo	Australia	1:02.19	Q
4	6	Devin Gotell	Canada	1:06.56	Q
5	2	Gerasimos Lignos	Greece	1:09.65	
6	7	Tyler Mrak	Canada	1:11.88	

== Final ==
18:53 17 September 2016:

Rank	Lane	Name	Nationality	Time	Notes
1st place, gold medalist(s)	4	Ihar Boki	Belarus	56.68	WR
2nd place, silver medalist(s)	6	Iaroslav Denysenko	Ukraine	59.02	
3rd place, bronze medalist(s)	5	Nicolas Guy Turbide	Canada	59.55	
4	3	Kirill Pankov	Uzbekistan	1:00.44	
5	7	Sean Russo	Australia	1:01.43	
6	2	Antti Latikka	Finland	1:02.84	
7	1	Muzaffar Tursunkhujaev	Uzbekistan	1:03.80	
8	8	Devin Gotell	Canada	1:06.62	
