= Swimming at the 2016 Summer Paralympics – Men's 100 metre breaststroke SB12 =

Men's 100 metre breaststroke SB12 at the XV Paralympic Games
- Venue: Olympic Aquatics Stadium
- Dates: 13 September 2016
- Competitors: 11 from 9 nations

Medalists
1st place, gold medalist(s)		Uladzimir Izotau	Belarus
2nd place, silver medalist(s)		Dzmitry Salei	Azerbaijan
3rd place, bronze medalist(s)		Maksym Veraksa	Ukraine

The Men's 100 metre breaststroke SB12 event at the 2016 Paralympic Games took place on 13 September 2016, at the Olympic Aquatics Stadium. Two heats were held. The swimmers with the eight fastest times advanced to the final.

== Heats ==
=== Heat 1 ===
10:56 13 September 2016:

Rank	Lane	Name	Nationality	Time	Notes
1	4	Uladzimir Izotau	Belarus	1:07.52	Q
2	3	Sergii Klippert	Ukraine	1:10.65	Q
3	5	Maksym Veraksa	Ukraine	1:10.92	Q
4	6	Samuel Ciorap	Romania	1:13.92	
5	2	Diego Fernando Cuesta Martinez	Colombia	1:19.46	

=== Heat 2 ===
11:00 13 September 2016:

Rank	Lane	Name	Nationality	Time	Notes
1	4	Dzmitry Salei	Azerbaijan	1:08.68	Q
2	5	Anuar Akhmetov	Kazakhstan	1:09.35	Q
3	6	Daniel Giraldo Correa	Colombia	1:10.53	Q
4	3	Daniel Simon	Germany	1:11.52	Q
5	2	Fabrizio Sottile	Italy	1:13.60	Q
6	7	Darvin Baez Eliza	Puerto Rico	1:18.70	

== Final ==
19:00 13 September 2016:

Rank	Lane	Name	Nationality	Time	Notes
1st place, gold medalist(s)	4	Uladzimir Izotau	Belarus	1:06.82	PR
2nd place, silver medalist(s)	5	Dzmitry Salei	Azerbaijan	1:08.80	
3rd place, bronze medalist(s)	7	Maksym Veraksa	Ukraine	1:09.00	
4	3	Anuar Akhmetov	Kazakhstan	1:09.17	
5	2	Sergii Klippert	Ukraine	1:10.55	
6	6	Daniel Giraldo Correa	Colombia	1:10.56	
7	1	Daniel Simon	Germany	1:12.08	
8	8	Fabrizio Sottile	Italy	1:13.92	
