= Belarus at the 2016 Summer Paralympics =

- IPC code: BLR
- NPC: Paralympic Committee of the Republic of Belarus

in Rio de Janeiro
- Competitors: 20 in 5 sports
- Flag bearer: Aliaksandr Tryputs
- Medals Ranked 19th: Gold 8 Silver 0 Bronze 2 Total 10

Summer Paralympics appearances (overview)
- 1996; 2000; 2004; 2008; 2012; 2016; 2020; 2024

Other related appearances
- Soviet Union (1988); Unified Team (1992)

Belarus competed at the 2016 Summer Paralympics in Rio de Janeiro, Brazil, from 7 to 18 September 2016. They delegated 20 athletes (10 men, 10 women) to the Summer Paralympics. They competed in athletics, judo, rowing, swimming and wheelchair fencing.

== Disability classifications ==
Every participant at the Paralympics has their disability grouped into one of five disability categories; amputation, the condition may be congenital or sustained through injury or illness; cerebral palsy; wheelchair athletes, there is often overlap between this and other categories; visual impairment, including blindness; Les autres, any physical disability that does not fall strictly under one of the other categories, for example dwarfism or multiple sclerosis. Each Paralympic sport then has its own classifications, dependent upon the specific physical demands of competition. Events are given a code, made of numbers and letters, describing the type of event and classification of the athletes competing. Some sports, such as athletics, divide athletes by both the category and severity of their disabilities, other sports, for example swimming, group competitors from different categories together, the only separation being based on the severity of the disability.

== Medalists ==
| Medal | Name | Sport | Event | Date |
|---|---|---|---|---|
| Gold | Ihar Boki | Swimming | Men's 100m butterfly S13 | 8 September |
| Gold | Ihar Boki | Swimming | Men's 200m individual medley SM13 | 10 September |
| Gold | Ihar Boki | Swimming | Men's 400m freestyle S13 | 12 September |
| Gold | Andrei Pranevich | Wheelchair fencing | Men's épée B | 13 September |
| Gold | Uladzimir Izotau | Swimming | Men's 100m breaststroke SB12 | 13 September |
| Gold | Ihar Boki | Swimming | Men's 50m freestyle S13 | 14 September |
| Gold | Ihar Boki | Swimming | Men's 100m freestyle S13 | 16 September |
| Gold | Ihar Boki | Swimming | Men's 100m backstroke S13 | 17 September |
| Bronze | Aliaksandr Tryputs | Athletics | Men's javelin throw F54 | 9 September |
| Bronze | Ihar Boki | Swimming | Men's 100m breaststroke SB13 | 11 September |

== Athletics ==
Men
Field events

| Athlete | Event | Final | |
| Athlete | Event | Distance | Position |
|---|---|---|---|
| Siarhei Burdukou | Long jump T12 | 6.98 PB | 5 |
| Andrei Mukha | Javelin throw F12 | 56.32 PB | 7 |
| Aliaksandr Subota | Long jump T47 | 5.88 | 14 |
| Aliaksandr Subota | Javelin throw F46 | 44.75 | 11 |
| Aliaksandr Tryputs | Javelin throw F54 | 23.56 | 3rd place, bronze medalist(s) |

Women
Field events

| Athlete | Event | Final | |
| Athlete | Event | Distance | Position |
|---|---|---|---|
| Anna Kaniuk | Long jump T12 | 5.45 | 5 |
| Tamara Sivakova | Shot put F12 | 11.24 | 6 |

== Judo ==
Men

| Athlete | Event | Round of 16 | Quarterfinals | Semifinals | Repechage 1 | Repechage 2 | Final / BM | |
| Athlete | Event | Opposition Result | Opposition Result | Opposition Result | Opposition Result | Opposition Result | Opposition Result | Rank |
|---|---|---|---|---|---|---|---|---|
| Aliaksandr Kazlou | −81 kg | Safarov (AZE); L 000–110 | Did not advance | | | | | |

Women

| Athlete | Event | Quarterfinals | Semifinals | Repechage | Final / BM | |
| Athlete | Event | Opposition Result | Opposition Result | Opposition Result | Opposition Result | Rank |
|---|---|---|---|---|---|---|
| Arina Kachan | +70 kg | Garcia (USA); W 101–000 | Alimova (UZB); L 000–100 | Bye | Taşbağ (TUR); L 000s3–000s1 | 5 |

== Rowing ==
One pathway for qualifying for Rio involved having a boat have top eight finish at the 2015 FISA World Rowing Championships in a medal event. Belarus qualified for the 2016 Games under this criterion in the AS Women's Single Sculls event with a fifth-place finish in a time of 05:38.39.

| Athlete | Event | Heats | | Repechage | | Final | |
| Athlete | Event | Time | Rank | Time | Rank | Time | Rank |
|---|---|---|---|---|---|---|---|
| Liudmila Vauchok | Women's single sculls | 5:44.98 | 3 R | 5:45.38 | 2 FA | 5:34.16 | 5 |

== Swimming ==
The top two finishers in each Rio medal event at the 2015 IPC Swimming World Championships earned a qualifying spot for their country for Rio. Ihar Boki earned Belarus a spot after winning gold in the Men's 50m Freestyle S13.

Men

| Athlete | Event | Heats | | Final | |
| Athlete | Event | Result | Rank | Result | Rank |
|---|---|---|---|---|---|
| Ihar Boki | 50m freestyle S13 | 23.73 PR | 1 Q | 23.44 PR | 1st place, gold medalist(s) |
| Ihar Boki | 100m freestyle S13 | 51.45 PR | 1 Q | 50.90 PR | 1st place, gold medalist(s) |
| Ihar Boki | 400m freestyle S13 | 4:02.23 | 1 Q | 3:55.62 PR | 1st place, gold medalist(s) |
| Ihar Boki | 100m backstroke S13 | 56.82 PR | 1 Q | 56.68 WR | 1st place, gold medalist(s) |
| Ihar Boki | 100m breaststroke SB13 | 1:06.79 | 3 Q | 1:06.71 | 3rd place, bronze medalist(s) |
| Ihar Boki | 100m butterfly S13 | 54.54 PR | 1 Q | 53.85 WR | 1st place, gold medalist(s) |
| Ihar Boki | 200m individual medley SM13 | 2:06.13 PR | 1 Q | 2:04.02 PR | 1st place, gold medalist(s) |
| Uladzimir Izotau | 50m freestyle S12 | 25.69 | 11 | Did not advance | |
| Uladzimir Izotau | 100m breaststroke SB12 | 1:07.52 | 1 Q | 1:06.82 PR | 1st place, gold medalist(s) |
| Hryhory Zudzilau | 50m freestyle S11 | 27.11 | 5 Q | 27.02 | 5 |
| Hryhory Zudzilau | 100m freestyle S11 | 1:00.27 | 4 Q | 1:00.21 | 6 |
| Hryhory Zudzilau | 100m backstroke S11 | 1:14.39 | 9 | Did not advance | |
| Hryhory Zudzilau | 100m butterfly S11 | —N/a | | 1:08.64 | 6 |
| Hryhory Zudzilau | 200m individual medley SM11 | 2:34.53 | 3 Q | 2:30.72 | 5 |

Women

| Athlete | Event | Heats | | Final | |
| Athlete | Event | Result | Rank | Result | Rank |
|---|---|---|---|---|---|
| Natallia Shavel | 50m backstroke S5 | 50.36 | 7 Q | 50.41 | 8 |
| Natallia Shavel | 100m breaststroke SB4 | 2:02.11 | 5 Q | 2:00.71 | 5 |
| Natallia Shavel | 50m butterfly S5 | 49.78 | 5 Q | 47.55 | 7 |
| Natallia Shavel | 200m individual medley SM5 | 3:41.11 | 5 Q | 3:39.61 | 4 |
| Aliaksandra Svadkouskaya | 50m freestyle S10 | 30.52 | 17 | Did not advance | |
| Aliaksandra Svadkouskaya | 100m breaststroke SB9 | 1:27.08 | 8 Q | 1:25.74 | 8 |
| Anastasiya Zudzilava | 100m backstroke S13 | 1:15.72 | 8 Q | 1:16.32 | 8 |
| Anastasiya Zudzilava | 100m breaststroke SB13 | 1:20.01 | 4 Q | 1:19.79 | 7 |
| Anastasiya Zudzilava | 200m individual medley SM13 | 2:44.78 | 13 | Did not advance | |

== Wheelchair fencing ==
Men

| Athlete | Event | Group stage | | | | | | Quarterfinals | Semifinals | Final | |
| Athlete | Event | Opposition Result | Opposition Result | Opposition Result | Opposition Result | Opposition Result | Rank | Opposition Result | Opposition Result | Opposition Result | Rank |
|---|---|---|---|---|---|---|---|---|---|---|---|
| Martyn Kavalenia | Foil A | Tokatlian (FRA); L 1–5 | Pender (POL); L 1–5 | Chan W K (HKG); L 3–5 | Sun G (CHN); L 0–5 | Lambertini (ITA); L 3–5 | 6 | Did not advance | | | |
| Andrei Pranevich | Épée B | Ifebe (FRA); W 5–1 | Coutya (GBR); L 4–5 | Tam C S (HKG); L 4–5 | Naumenko (UKR); L 3–5 | —N/a | 4 Q | Coutya (GBR); W 15–13 | Naumenko (UKR); W 15–8 | Ali (IRQ); W 15–14 | 1st place, gold medalist(s) |

Women

| Athlete | Event | Group stage | | | | | | Quarterfinals | Semifinals | Final | |
| Athlete | Event | Opposition Result | Opposition Result | Opposition Result | Opposition Result | Opposition Result | Rank | Opposition Result | Opposition Result | Opposition Result | Rank |
|---|---|---|---|---|---|---|---|---|---|---|---|
| Aliona Halkina | Foil A | Mogos (ITA); W 5–4 | Ng J C (HKG); L 3–5 | Rong J (CHN); L 2–5 | Bernard (FRA); L 1–5 | Hajmasi (HUN); L 1–5 | 11 | Did not advance | | | |
| Aliona Halkina | Épée A | Deluca (USA); W 5–3 | Burdon (POL); W 5–1 | Zou X (CHN); L 3–5 | Collis (GBR); W 5–4 | Krajnyak (HUN); W 5–4 | 3 Q | Krajnyak (HUN); L 12–15 | Did not advance | | |
| Anastasiya Kastsiuchkova | Épée B | Makrytskaya (BLR); L 1–5 | Chan Y C (HKG); W 5–2 | Dani (HUN); W 5–0 | Jana (THA); W 5–2 | Zhou J (CHN); W 5–4 | 1 Q | Zhou J (CHN); L 4–15 | Did not advance | | |
| Alesia Makrytskaya | Foil B | Vio (ITA); L 0–5 | Khetsuriani (GEO); W 5–2 | Briese-Bätke (GER); W 5–3 | Chung Y P (HKG); W 5–0 | Yao F (CHN); L 0–5 | 3 Q | Yao F (CHN); L 11–15 | Did not advance | | |
| Alesia Makrytskaya | Épée B | Anastasiya Kastsiuchkova (BLR); W 5–1 | Dani (HUN); W 5–4 | Jana (THA); L 2–5 | Zhou J (CHN); L 4–5 | Chan Y C (HKG); L 2–5 | 8 Q | Briese-Bätke (GER); L 9–15 | Did not advance | | |
| Aliona Halkina; Anastasiya Kastsiuchkova; Alesia Makrytskaya | Foil team | Hungary; L 23–45 | China; L 11–45 | —N/a | | | 3 | —N/a | Did not advance | Brazil; W 45–27 | 5 |
| Aliona Halkina; Anastasiya Kastsiuchkova; Alesia Makrytskaya | Épée team | Hungary; L 35–45 | China; L 29–45 | —N/a | | | 3 | —N/a | Did not advance | Brazil; W 45–29 | 5 |

== See also ==
- Belarus at the Paralympics
- Belarus at the 2016 Summer Olympics
