= Swimming at the 2012 Summer Paralympics – Men's 100 metre breaststroke SB12 =

Event at the 2012 Summer Paralympics

Men's 100m Breaststroke SB12 at the XIV Paralympic Games
- Venue: London Aquatics Centre
- Dates: 8 September 2012
- Competitors: 15 from 11 nations
- Winning time: 1:07.05

Medalists
1st place, gold medalist(s)		Mikhail Zimin	Russia
2nd place, silver medalist(s)		Uladzimir Izotau	Belarus
3rd place, bronze medalist(s)		Maksym Veraksa	Ukraine

The men's 100m breaststroke SB12 event at the 2012 Summer Paralympics took place at the London Aquatics Centre on 8 September. There were two heats; the swimmers with the seven fastest times advanced to the final, while because of tied times in the heats the eighth final place was decided by a swim-off.

== Results ==
=== Heats ===
Competed from 10:08. Qualification swim-off at 12.11.

==== Heat 1 ====
Rank	Lane	Name	Nationality	Time	Notes
1	4	Uladzimir Izotau	Belarus	1:07.72	Q
2	6	Daniel Giraldo Correa	Colombia	1:11.35	Q, AM
3	5	Oleg Tkalienko	Ukraine	1:12.45	Q
4	3	Sergii Klippert	Ukraine	1:12.93	Q (swim-off 1:10.56)
5	2	Daniel Simon	Germany	1:15.05	
6	7	Yury Rudzenok	Belarus	1:16.64	
7	1	Jeremy McClure	Australia	1:24.19	

==== Heat 2 ====
Rank	Lane	Name	Nationality	Time	Notes
1	5	Mikhail Zimin	Russia	1:08.73	Q
2	4	Maksym Veraksa	Ukraine	1:10.10	Q
3	3	Enrique Floriano	Spain	1:11.61	Q
4	7	Ignacio Gonzalez	Argentina	1:12.83	Q
5	6	Michel Tielbeke	Netherlands	1:12.93	(swim-off 1:11.60)
6	2	Sergey Punko	Russia	1:13.87	
7	1	Anuar Akhmetov	Kazakhstan	1:15.09	
8	8	Peter Tichy	Austria	1:26.69	

=== Final ===
Competed at 17:58.

Rank	Lane	Name	Nationality	Time	Notes
1st place, gold medalist(s)	5	Mikhail Zimin	Russia	1:07.05	WR
2nd place, silver medalist(s)	4	Uladzimir Izotau	Belarus	1:07.28	
3rd place, bronze medalist(s)	3	Maksym Veraksa	Ukraine	1:07.79	
4	8	Sergii Klippert	Ukraine	1:10.75	
5	7	Oleg Tkalienko	Ukraine	1:11.00	
6	2	Enrique Floriano	Spain	1:11.42	
7	6	Daniel Giraldo Correa	Colombia	1:11.71	
8	1	Ignacio Gonzalez	Argentina	1:12.96	

Q = qualified for final. WR = World Record. AM = Americas Record.
