= Iaroslav Denysenko =

Ukrainian Paralympic swimmer

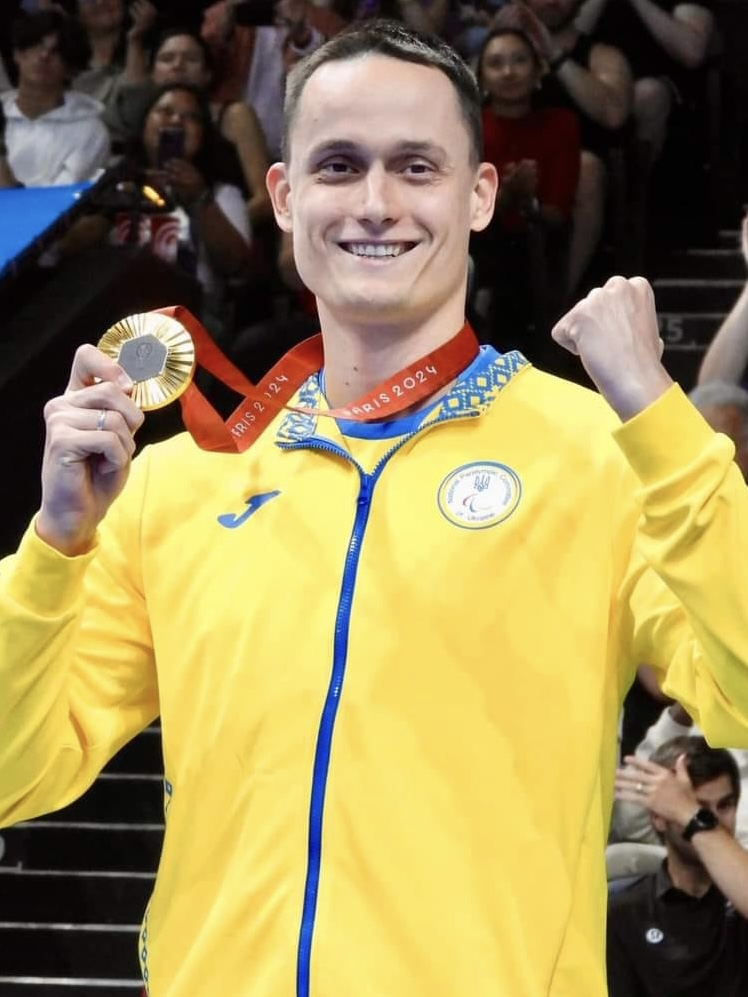
- Denysenko at the 2024 Summer Paralympics

Personal information
- Native name: Ярослав Юрійович Денисенко
- Full name: Yaroslav Yuriyovych Denysenko
- Nationality: Ukraine
- Born: 23 September 1991 (age 34) Poltava
- Height: 1.93 m (6 ft 4 in)

Sport
- Sport: Swimming
- Strokes: freestyle, backstroke, butterfly, medley
- Classifications: S13 due to blindness
- Club: Invasport, Poltava, (Ukraine)
- Coach: Ilia Kalaida
Medal record
Men's para swimming
Representing Ukraine
Summer Paralympics
| Gold medal – first place | 2024 Paris | 100 m freestyle S12 |
| Gold medal – first place | 2024 Paris | Mixed 4×100 m freestyle relay 49pts |
| Silver medal – second place | 2016 Rio | 100 m freestyle S13 |
| Silver medal – second place | 2016 Rio | 400 m freestyle S13 |
| Silver medal – second place | 2016 Rio | 100 m backstroke S13 |
| Silver medal – second place | 2016 Rio | 200 m medley S13 |
| Bronze medal – third place | 2024 Paris | 100 m backstroke S12 |
World Championships
| Gold medal – first place | 2013 Eindhoven | 50 m freestyle - SM13 |
| Silver medal – second place | 2013 Eindhoven | 100 m freestyle - SM13 |
| Silver medal – second place | 2013 Eindhoven | 400 m freestyle - SM13 |
| Silver medal – second place | 2013 Eindhoven | 100 m backstroke - SM13 |
| Silver medal – second place | 2013 Eindhoven | 200 m medley - SM13 |
| Silver medal – second place | 2015 Glasgow | 100 m freestyle - SM13 |
| Silver medal – second place | 2015 Glasgow | 400 m freestyle - SM13 |
| Silver medal – second place | 2015 Glasgow | 100 m backstroke - SM13 |
| Silver medal – second place | 2015 Glasgow | 200 m medley - SM13 |
| Bronze medal – third place | 2015 Glasgow | 50 m freestyle - SM13 |
European Championships
| Gold medal – first place | 2018 Dublin | 100 m freestyle - SM12 |
| Gold medal – first place | 2018 Dublin | 400 m freestyle - SM12 |
| Gold medal – first place | 2018 Dublin | 100 m backstroke - SM12 |
| Gold medal – first place | 2018 Dublin | 200 m medley SM12 |
| Gold medal – first place | 2018 Dublin | 4 x 100 m freestyle relay 49pts |
| Gold medal – first place | 2024 Madeira | 100 m freestyle S12 |
| Silver medal – second place | 2018 Dublin | 50 m freestyle - SM12 |
| Silver medal – second place | 2018 Dublin | 100 m butterfly - SM12 |
| Silver medal – second place | 2016 Funchal | 50 m freestyle - SM13 |
| Silver medal – second place | 2016 Funchal | 100 m freestyle - SM13 |
| Silver medal – second place | 2016 Funchal | 400 m freestyle - SM13 |
| Silver medal – second place | 2016 Funchal | 100 m butterfly - SM13 |
| Silver medal – second place | 2016 Funchal | 200 m medley SM13 |
| Silver medal – second place | 2014 Eindhoven | 50 m freestyle - SM13 |
| Silver medal – second place | 2014 Eindhoven | 100 m freestyle - SM13 |
| Silver medal – second place | 2024 Madeira | 100 m backstroke S12 |
| Bronze medal – third place | 2024 Madeira | 100 m butterfly S12 |

Iaroslav Denysenko (Yaroslav Yuriyovych Denysenko, Ukrainian: Ярослав Юрійович Денисенко; born 23 September 1991) is a swimmer from Ukraine who competes in Paralympic S13, SB13 and SM13 (individual medley) events. A five time European champion, in 2013 Denysenko won the World Championship in 50 metres freestyle S13, and has appeared in two Paralympic Games

== Career history ==
Denysenko began swimming competitively in 2013 for Ukraine, winning the world title in his debut season. He came to international attention when he competed at the 2016 Paralympic Games, winning four silver medals.

The following year Denysenko represented Ukraine again, winning 5 gold and two silver medals at the 2018 World Para Swimming European Championships, dominating the S12 classification.

== Personal life ==
In recognition of his performance at the 2016 Paralympic Games in Rio de Janeiro, he received the Order for Merits [second grade] in Ukraine. He has also received the title of Honoured Master of Sport in Ukraine. His wife Kateryna Denysenko [Istomina] has competed in Para swimming, winning gold in the S8 100m butterfly at the 2016 Paralympic Games in Rio de Janeiro.
