= Braedan Jason =

Australian Paralympic swimmer

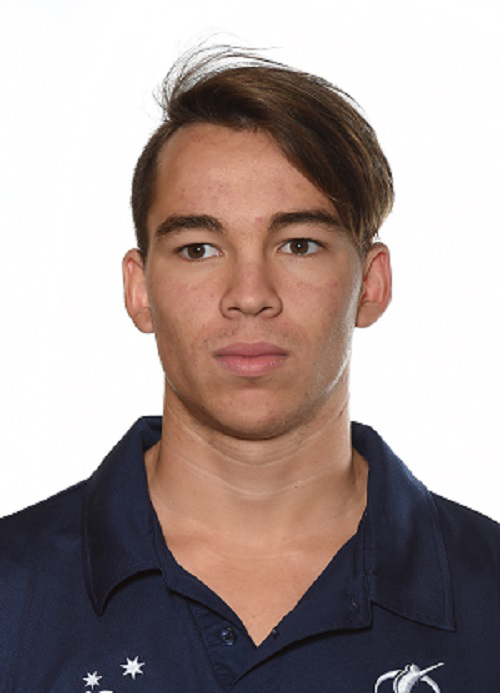

Personal information
- Nationality: Australia
- Born: 15 May 1998 (age 28) Cronulla, New South Wales

Sport
- Sport: Swimming
- Classifications: S13, SB13, SM13
- Club: USC Spartans
- Coach: Nathan Doyle

Braedan Jason (born 15 May 1998) is an Australian Paralympic swimmer. He represented Australia at the 2016 Rio Paralympics and the 2020 Tokyo Paralympics.

== Personal ==
Jason was born on 15 May 1998 in Cronulla, New South Wales. He is the second oldest of four boys. He was born with cone dystrophy resulting in him having ten percent vision and being classed as being legally blind. His brother, Nathan, also has the same condition. He has attended St Joseph's College, Nudgee in Queensland.

== Sporting career ==
Jason began swimming at the age of eight. He started as a nipper at North Cronulla Surf Life Saving Club. He continued his surf life-saving at Alexandra Headlands Club. In 2015, he finished ninth-place finish in a field of 15 at the 2015 Australian Surf Life Saving Championships. He is also a pool swimmer. In 2012, he won the silver medal at the age national swimming championships. In April 2015, Jason competed at the Australian Swimming Championships where the able-bodied and the Paralympic teams were combined. He then went on to compete at the 2015 IPC Swimming World Championships where he came fifth in the Men's 50m and 400m freestyle S13 and sixth in Men's 100m Freestyle S13 and seventh in the Men's 100m Butterfly S13.

Jason competed at the 2016 Rio Paralympics in four events. He placed sixth in Men's 50m Freestyle S13, seventh in Men's 100m Freestyle S14, fifth in Men's 400m Freestyle S13 and seventh in Men's 100m Butterfly S13.

At the 2019 World Para Swimming Championships in London, he swam in five events and his best placing was fourth in the Men's 400m Freestyle (S13) and broke Oceania records in Men's 100m Butterfly (S12) and Men's 100m Freestyle (S12).

At the 2020 Tokyo Paralympics, he finished fourth in the Men's 400 m freestyle S13, fifth in the Men's 100 m freestyle S12, and sixth in the Men's 100 m butterfly S12.

At the 2022 Birmingham Commonwealth Games, he finished 4th in the Men's 50 m Freestyle S13.

He was coached by Jan Cameron at the University of the Sunshine Coast in Sippy Downs, Queensland. Since 2021, he has been coached by Nathan Doyle.
