= Edgar Quirós Baltanas =

Spanish Paralympic swimmer

Personal information
- Nationality: Spanish

Sport
- Country: Spain
- Sport: Swimming

Edgar Quirós is a vision impaired swimmer from Spain who has represented the country at the 2012 Summer Paralympics.

== Personal ==
Quirós is from Córdoba.

== Swimming ==
Quirós is a member of C.N. Mijas.

Quirós competed at the 2009 Spanish national winter championships, where he won the S13 50, 100 and 200 meter breaststroke events. He competed at the 2009 German Open. At the 2010 Championship of Spain of Paralympic Swimming, he won gold medals in the 50, 100 and 200 meter breaststroke events and in the 50 meter butterfly event. At the Netherlands hosted 2010 World Championship, he had a fifth-place finish. In July, he participated in a ceremony hosted by the Mayor of Málaga at the townhall honouring all the Olympic and Paralympic competitors from the city.

Quirós was one of twelve vision impaired Spanish swimmers competing at the 2012 Games. In London, after qualifying for the finals he finished fifth in the 100 meter backstroke. He finished third in his heat for the event, behind Daniel Sharp of New Zealand and Sergey Punko of Russia. He finished sixth in the 100 meter freestyle. Prior to heading to London, he participated in a national vision impaired swim team training camp at the High Performance Centre of Sant Cugat from 6 to 23 August. Daily at the camp, there were two in water training sessions and one out of water training session. Actualmente ha abierto un club de natacion de competicion en alhaurin de la torre.
