= Tim Antalfy =

Australian Paralympic swimmer

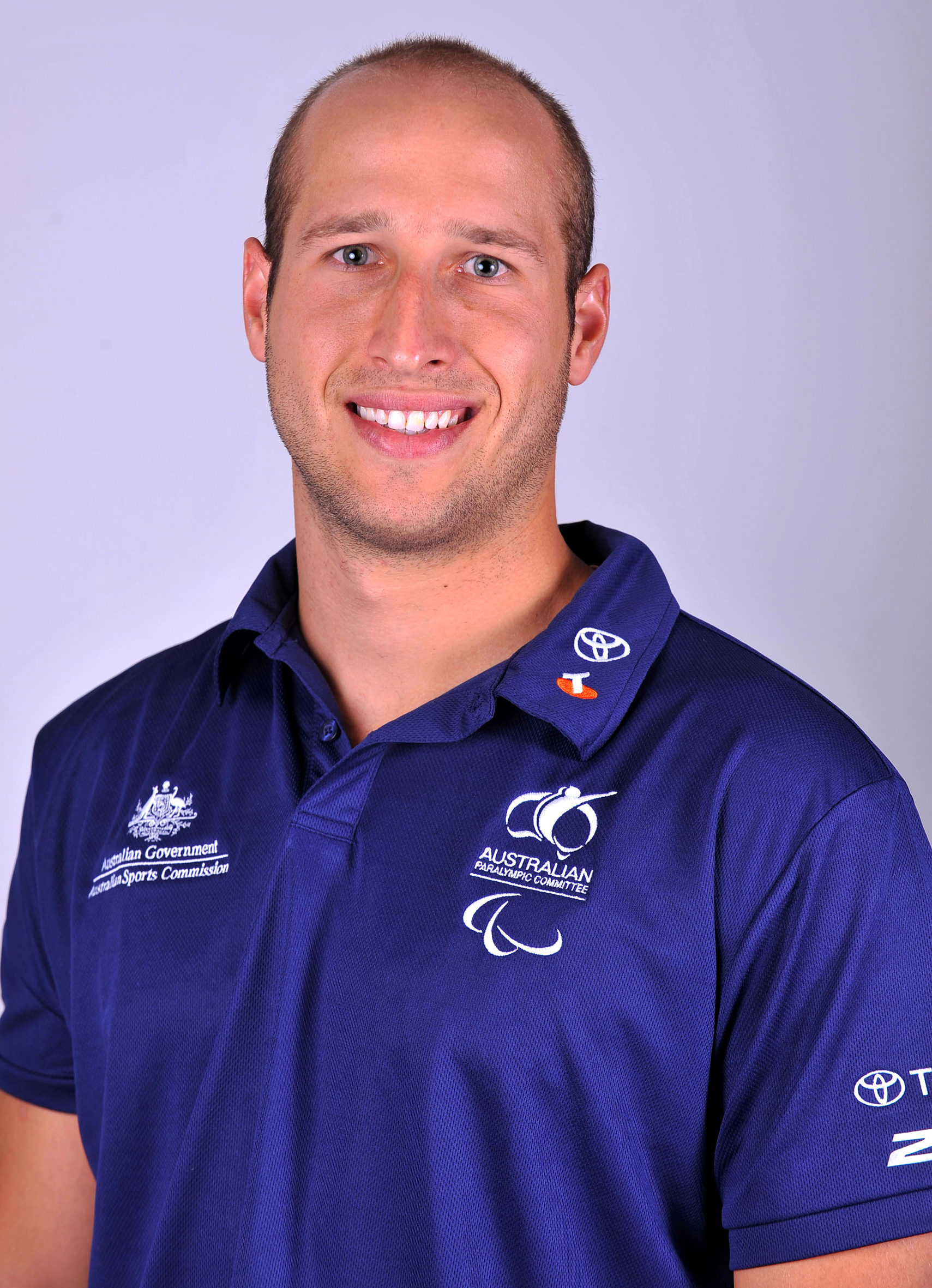
- 2012 Australian Paralympic team portrait of Antalfy

Personal information
- Full name: Timothy Antalfy
- Nationality: Australia
- Born: 1 April 1987 (age 39)

Sport
- Sport: Swimming
- Strokes: Butterfly, Freestyle
- Classifications: S13, SB13, SM13
- Club: Hunters Hill
- Coach: Bash Zidan
Medal record
Men's paralympic swimming
Representing Australia
Paralympic Games
Bronze medal – third place	2012 London	100 m butterfly S13
World Championships (LC)
Bronze medal – third place	2013 Montreal	100 m butterfly S13
Bronze medal – third place	2015 Glasgow	100 m butterfly S13

Timothy Antalfy (born 1 April 1987) is an Australian Paralympic swimmer. He represented Australia at the 2012 Summer Paralympics in swimming and won a bronze medal.

== Personal ==
Antalfy was born on 1 April 1987, and is from Georges Hall, New South Wales. He is legally blind as a result of retinitis pigmentosa, a hereditary disease. Beyond swimming, he also is involved with surfing, waterskiing and wake boarding.

== Swimming ==
Antalfy is a S13 classified swimmer swimming in 100 metre butterfly, 50 metre freestyle and 50 metre freestyle events. He is a member of the Hunters Hill Swimming Club. When at the club, he is trained by Bash Zidan.

Antalfy started competing in 1995. In 2005, he was a member of the MLC Marlins Swim Team where he was coached by John Bladon. As a member of the team, he was the first swimmer to compete at the National Open Short-Course Championship and make the finals. At the competition, he finished fifth in the 50m Butterfly event, with a heat time of 24.56 seconds, semifinals time of 24.49 seconds, and final time of 24.73 seconds. He set personal bests in the 100m Butterfly with a time of 57.74 seconds where he finished 35th overall, best time in the 50m Freestyle with a time of 23.81 seconds while finishing 38th overall. He won three gold medals and one silver medal at the 2011 Tasmanian State Championships. He broke six world records in four different events during the 2012 Australian national swimming championships.

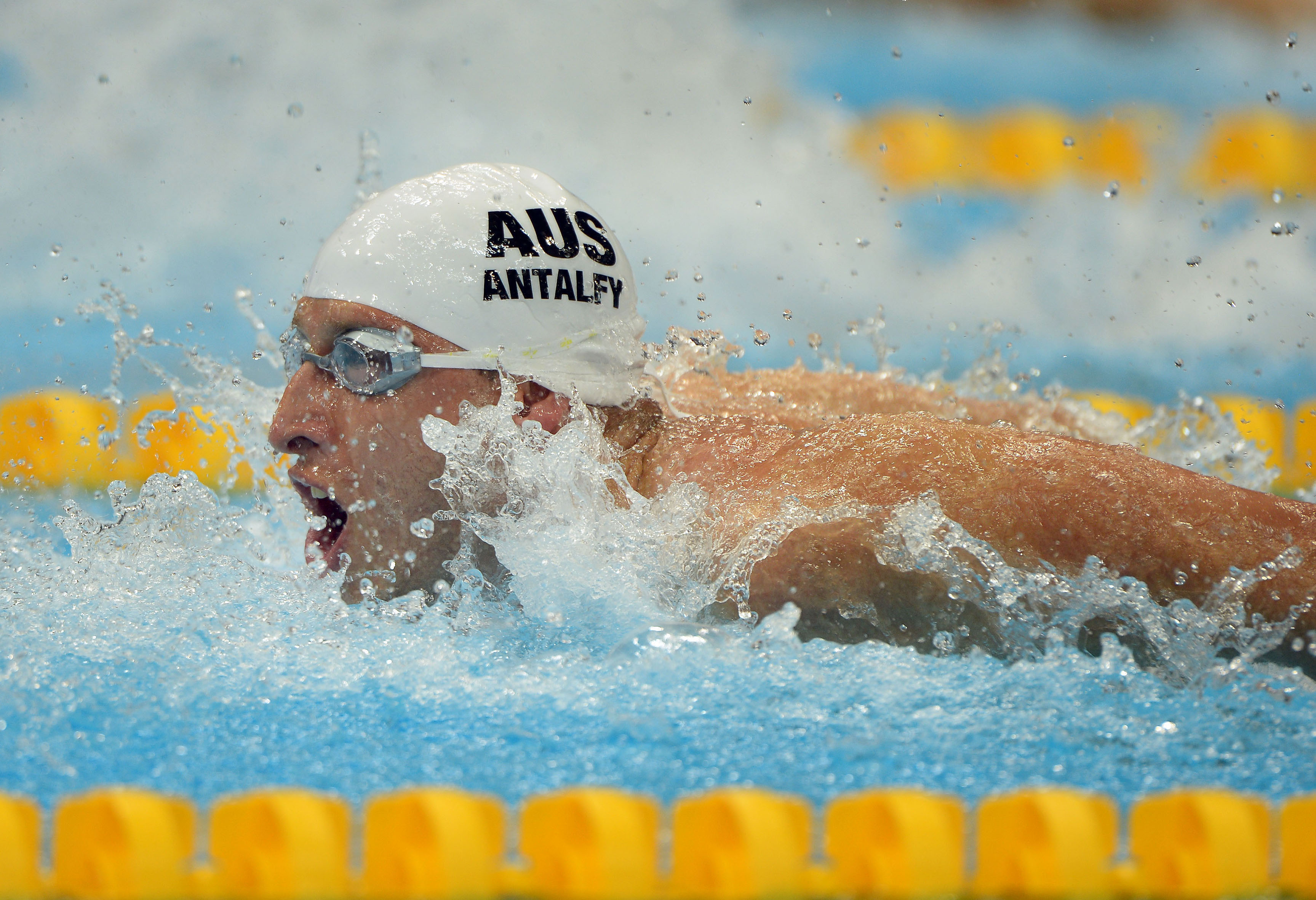
Antalfy at the 2012 London Paralympics

Antalfy first represented Australia in 2011, competing in the Para Pan Pacific and Arafura Games that year. He earned a gold medal at the Arafura Games in the 50m backstroke event, a silver medal in the 100m butterfly event, and three bronze medals 50m freestyle, 100m freestyle and 50m breaststroke events. He was part of the November 2011 World Cup short course meet in Beijing. That month he also competed in World Cup events in Singapore and Tokyo. As a twenty-five years old, he was selected to represent Australia at the 2012 Summer Paralympics in swimming in the 100m and 50m freestyle, 100m butterfly and 100m backstroke S13 events. In the lead up to the Games, he trained at the Lane Cove Aquatic Leisure Centre. In an average week, he had three total gym sessions and seven sessions in the pool.

At the 2012 Summer Paralympics, he won a bronze medal in the Men's 100 m Butterfly S13. Competing at the 2013 IPC Swimming World Championships in Montreal, Quebec, Canada, he won a bronze medal in the Men's 100 m Butterfly S13. At the 2015 IPC Swimming World Championships, he won a bronze medal in the Men's 100 m Butterfly S13. He finished eighth in the Men's 50m Freestyle S13.

=== Personal bests ===
Course	Event	Time	Meet	Swim Date	Reference
Long	50m Backstroke	28.2	2012 EnergyAustralia Swimming Championships	20-Mar-12	
Long	100m Backstroke	01:05.3	2012 EnergyAustralia Swimming Championships	15-Mar-12	
Long	50m Butterfly	24.53	2012 EnergyAustralia Swimming Championships	17-Mar-12	
Long	100m Butterfly	54.92	2012 EnergyAustralia Swimming Championships	21-Mar-12	
Long	50m Freestyle	24.32	2011 NSW State Open Championsh	11-Feb-11	
Long	50m Freestyle	24.32	2011 NSW Grand Prix Meet	10-Dec-11	
Long	100m Freestyle	52.55	2012 EnergyAustralia Swimming Championships	19-Mar-12	
Short	50m Butterfly	24.08	FINA World Cup 2011 Stage 6 - Beijing	8-Nov-11	
Short	100m Butterfly	53.94	FINA World Cup 2011 Stage 7 - Tokyo	13-Nov-11	
Short	50m Freestyle	23.31	FINA World Cup 2011 Stage 5 - Singapore	5-Nov-11	
Short	100m Freestyle	51.52	FINA World Cup 2011 Stage 5 - Singapore	4-Nov-11	
