= Carlos Farrenberg =

Brazilian Paralympic swimmer

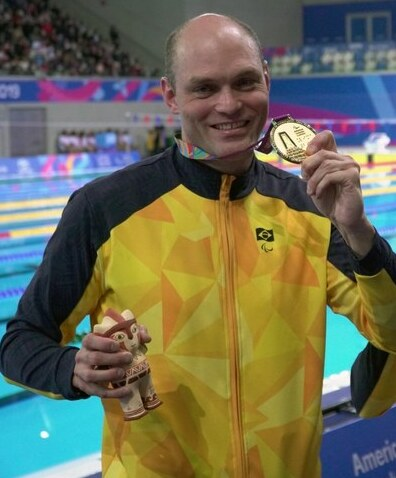
- Farrenberg in 2019

Personal information
- Full name: Carlos Alonso Farrenberg
- Nationality: Brazilian
- Born: 10 January 1980 (age 46) São Paulo, Brazil
- Height: 1.95 m (6 ft 5 in)

Sport
- Sport: Swimming
- Disability class: S13
- Event(s): Freestyle, butterfly
- Club: Santa Cecilia University

Achievements and titles
- Paralympic finals: 2008; 2012; 2016
Medal record
Representing Brazil
Paralympic Games
Silver medal – second place	2016 Rio de Janeiro	50 metre freestyle S13
IPC World Championships
Silver medal – second place	2006 Durban	100 m freestyle S13
Silver medal – second place	2015 Glasgow	50 m freestyle S13
Bronze medal – third place	2010 Eindhoven	100 m freestyle S13
IPC World Championships (25m)
Gold medal – first place	2009 Rio de Janeiro	100 m freestyle S13
Silver medal – second place	2009 Rio de Janeiro	400 m freestyle S13
Bronze medal – third place	2009 Rio de Janeiro	100 m freestyle S13
Bronze medal – third place	2009 Rio de Janeiro	4x100 m freestyle 49pts
Bronze medal – third place	2009 Rio de Janeiro	4x100 m medley 49pts
Parapan American Games
Gold medal – first place	2007 Rio de Janeiro	50 m freestyle S13
Gold medal – first place	2007 Rio de Janeiro	100 m freestyle S13
Gold medal – first place	2007 Rio de Janeiro	400 m freestyle S13
Gold medal – first place	2011 Guadalajara	50 m freestyle S13
Gold medal – first place	2011 Guadalajara	100 m freestyle S13
Gold medal – first place	2015 Toronto	50 m freestyle S13
Gold medal – first place	2015 Toronto	100 m freestyle S13
Gold medal – first place	2019 Lima	50m freestyle S13
Gold medal – first place	2019 Lima	100m freestyle S13
Silver medal – second place	2007 Rio de Janeiro	200m individual medley SM13
Silver medal – second place	2015 Toronto	100 m butterfly S13

Carlos Alonso Farrenberg (born 10 January 1980) is a Paralympic swimmer from Brazil competing mainly in category S13 events for partially sighted athletes. Farrenberg has competed at three Paralympic Games beginning with the 2008 Summer Paralympics in Beijing. He won his only medal at his home games in Rio in 2016, a silver in the 50 metres freestyle. As well as his Paralympic medal, Farrenberg has also won multiple medals at World Championship level.

== Personal history ==
Farrenberg was born in São Paulo, Brazil in 1980. He was born with congenital toxoplasmosis which resulted in his vision gradually failing until stabilising at the age of 13 leaving him with 20 percent of normal vision. He was educated at the Faculty of Physical Education in Santos. He is married to Tatyana and they had their first child in 2015.

== Swimming career ==
Farrenberg was introduced to swimming as a child but gave up the sport as a teenager. At University he took up goalball, but then heard of trials for disabled swimmers for the 2004 Summer Paralympics in Athens and decided to try out. Despite being away from the pool for ten years and with only a month of training, Farrenberg broke three Brazilian swimming records for the S13 class during the trails. These times were not sufficient to allow Farrenberg to qualify for Athens, but it spurred him on to take up swimming professionally again.

He first represented Brazil at the 2006 IPC World Swimming Championships in Durban winning a silver medal in the 100 metre freestyle (S13). Farrenberg competed in his first Summer Paralympics in 2008 in Beijing. He competed in four events, with his best result being a fourth place in the 50 metre freestyle. In 2009 he competed in the IPC World Short Course Championship, held in Brazil. He won five medals including an individual gold in the 100 metre freestyle. The following year he won a bronze in the 2010 World Championships in Eindhoven.

Farrenberg qualified for his second Paralympics in 2012, travelling to London to compete in four events. He managed to get through two of the heats finishing sixth in the 50 metres freestyle and 8th in the 100 metres. In the build-up to the 2016 Summer Paralympics in Brazil, he won a silver in the 50 metre S13 at the 2015 IPC Swimming World Championships in Glasgow. At the 2016 Summer Paralympics in Rio de Janeiro he entered just two events, the 50 metre and 100 metre freestyles. He came through the heats of the 100 metres and finished fifth in the finals. In the 50 metres he finished first in his qualifying heat, but his main rival, Ihar Boki of Belarus, set a Paralympic record in his heat. Farrenberg swam a time of 24.27 seconds to win his first Paralympic medal, a silver.
