= Dmitriy Horlin =

Uzbekistani Paralympic swimmer

Sport
- Country: Uzbekistan
- Sport: Paralympic swimming
- Disability: Vision impairment
- Disability class: S12
Medal record
Men's paralympic swimming
Representing Uzbekistan
Paralympic Games
| Bronze medal – third place | 2016 Rio de Janeiro | 400 m freestyle S13 |
World Championships
| Bronze medal – third place | 2015 Glasgow | 400 m freestyle S13 |
Asian Para Games
| Gold medal – first place | 2018 Jakarta | 50 m freestyle S12 |
| Gold medal – first place | 2018 Jakarta | 400 m freestyle S13 |
| Gold medal – first place | 2018 Jakarta | 200 m ind. medley SM13 |
| Gold medal – first place | 2022 Hangzhou | 400 m freestyle S13 |
| Bronze medal – third place | 2018 Jakarta | 100 m freestyle S13 |
| Bronze medal – third place | 2018 Jakarta | 100 m butterfly S13 |

Dmitriy Horlin is a visually impaired Uzbekistani Paralympic swimmer. He is a bronze medalist at the 2016 Summer Paralympics held in Rio de Janeiro, Brazil.

== Career ==
Horlin represented Uzbekistan at the 2016 Summer Paralympics in Rio de Janeiro, Brazil and he won the bronze medal in the men's 400 metre freestyle S13 event.

At the 2015 IPC Swimming World Championships held in Glasgow, United Kingdom, he won the bronze medal in the men's 400 metre freestyle S13 event.

He competed at the 2019 World Para Swimming Championships held in London, United Kingdom in several events. He did not win a medal on this occasion.
