= Uladzimir Izotau =

Belarusian swimmer (born 1988)

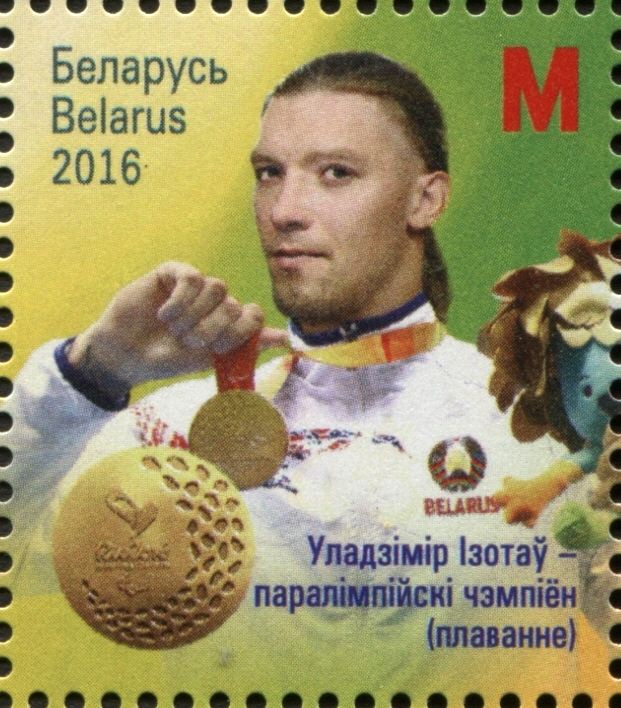
- Postage stamp "Medalists of the XV Summer Paralympic Games in Rio de Janeiro"

Personal information
- Born: 6 September 1988 (age 38) Homyel, Soviet Union
- Height: 1.89 m (6 ft 2 in)

Sport
- Country: Belarus
- Sport: Paralympic swimming
- Disability: Visual impairment
- Disability class: S12
- Coached by: Gennady Vishnyakov (personal trainer)
Medal record
Men's para swimming
Representing Belarus
Paralympic Games
Bronze medal – third place	2008 Beijing	100m breaststroke SB13
Silver medal – second place	2012 London	100m breaststroke SB12
Gold medal – first place	2016 Rio de Janeiro	100m breaststroke SB12
World Championships
Silver medal – second place	2010 Eindhoven	100m breaststroke SB12
Gold medal – first place	2013 Montreal	100m breaststroke SB12
Gold medal – first place	2015 Glasgow	100m breaststroke SB12
Gold medal – first place	2017 Mexico City	100m breaststroke SB12
European Championships
Silver medal – second place	2014 Eindhoven	100m breaststroke SB12
Gold medal – first place	2016 Funchal	100m breaststroke SB12
Silver medal – second place	2018 Dublin	100m breaststroke SB13
Silver medal – second place	2026 Kocaeli	100m breaststroke SB12
Representing Neutral Paralympic Athletes
European Championships
Bronze medal – third place	2024 Funchal	100 m breaststroke SB12

Uladzimir Izotau (born 6 September 1988) is a Belarusian para swimmer who specializes in the breaststroke. At the 2016 Paralympic Games, he won the gold medal in the men's 100m breaststroke SB12 final. The games were commemorated on postage stamps all over the world. Izotau represented Belarus.
