= Ihar Boki =

Belarusian Paralympic swimmer

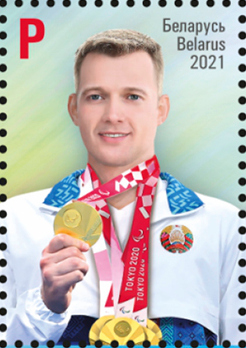
- Ihar Boki on a 2021 stamp of Belarus

Personal information
- Nationality: Belarus
- Born: 28 June 1994 (age 32) Bobruisk, Belarus
- Height: 1.90 m (6 ft 3 in)

Sport
- Sport: Paralympic swimming
- Disability class: S13, SB13, SM13
- Coached by: Gennady Vishnyakov
Medal record
Men's para swimming
Representing Belarus
Event	1st	2nd	3rd
Paralympic Games	16	1	1
World Championships	11	1	0
European Championships	14	1	1
Representing the Neutral Paralympic Athletes
Paralympic Games	5	0	0
European Championships	4	1	0
Total	50	4	1
Representing Belarus
Paralympic Games
Gold medal – first place	2012 London	100 m freestyle S13
Gold medal – first place	2012 London	400 m freestyle S13
Gold medal – first place	2012 London	100 m backstroke S13
Gold medal – first place	2012 London	100 m butterfly S13
Gold medal – first place	2012 London	200 m medley SM13
Gold medal – first place	2016 Rio de Janeiro	50 m freestyle S13
Gold medal – first place	2016 Rio de Janeiro	400 m freestyle S13
Gold medal – first place	2016 Rio de Janeiro	100 m freestyle S13
Gold medal – first place	2016 Rio de Janeiro	100 m backstroke S13
Gold medal – first place	2016 Rio de Janeiro	100 m butterfly S13
Gold medal – first place	2016 Rio de Janeiro	200 m medley SM13
Gold medal – first place	2020 Tokyo	400 m freestyle S13
Gold medal – first place	2020 Tokyo	100 m butterfly S13
Gold medal – first place	2020 Tokyo	50 m freestyle S13
Gold medal – first place	2020 Tokyo	100 m backstroke S13
Gold medal – first place	2020 Tokyo	200 m individual medley
Silver medal – second place	2012 London	50 m freestyle S13
Bronze medal – third place	2016 Rio de Janeiro	100 m breaststroke S13
World Championships
Gold medal – first place	2013 Montreal	100 m freestyle S13
Gold medal – first place	2013 Montreal	400 m freestyle S13
Gold medal – first place	2013 Montreal	100 m backstroke S13
Gold medal – first place	2013 Montreal	100 m butterfly S13
Gold medal – first place	2013 Montreal	200 m medley
Gold medal – first place	2015 Glasgow	50 m freestyle S13
Gold medal – first place	2015 Glasgow	100 m medley S13
Gold medal – first place	2015 Glasgow	200 m medley SM13
Gold medal – first place	2015 Glasgow	100 m freestyle S13
Gold medal – first place	2015 Glasgow	400 m freestyle S13
Gold medal – first place	2015 Glasgow	100 m butterfly S13
Silver medal – second place	2015 Glasgow	100 m breaststroke SB13
European Championships
Gold medal – first place	2014 Eindhoven	50 m freestyle S13
Gold medal – first place	2014 Eindhoven	100 m freestyle S13
Gold medal – first place	2016 Funchal	50m freestyle S13
Gold medal – first place	2016 Funchal	100m freestyle S13
Gold medal – first place	2016 Funchal	400m freestyle S13
Gold medal – first place	2016 Funchal	100 m backstroke S13
Gold medal – first place	2016 Funchal	100 m butterfly S13
Gold medal – first place	2020 Madeira	100 m butterfly S13
Gold medal – first place	2020 Madeira	100 m freestyle S13
Gold medal – first place	2020 Madeira	100 m butterfly S13
Gold medal – first place	2020 Madeira	100 m backstroke S13
Gold medal – first place	2020 Madeira	50 m freestyle S13
Gold medal – first place	2020 Madeira	400 m freestyle S13
Gold medal – first place	2020 Madeira	200 m medley S13
Silver medal – second place	2020 Madeira	100 m breaststroke SB13
Bronze medal – third place	2016 Funchal	100 m breaststroke SB13
Representing Neutral Paralympic Athletes
Paralympic Games
Gold medal – first place	2024 Paris	100 m butterfly S13
Gold medal – first place	2024 Paris	100 m backstroke S13
Gold medal – first place	2024 Paris	400 m freestyle S13
Gold medal – first place	2024 Paris	50 m freestyle S13
Gold medal – first place	2024 Paris	200 m medley SM13
European Championships
Gold medal – first place	2024 Madeira	50 m freestyle S13
Gold medal – first place	2024 Madeira	100 m freestyle S13
Gold medal – first place	2024 Madeira	100 m butterfly S13
Gold medal – first place	2024 Madeira	200 m medley SM13
Silver medal – second place	2024 Madeira	100 m backstroke S13

Ihar Boki (Belarusian: Ігар Аляксандравіч Бокій; born 28 June 1994) is a visually impaired Belarusian Paralympic swimmer. Competing at 4 Paralympics from 2012 to 2024, Boki has won 21 Gold Medals, 1 Silver, and 1 Bronze Medal. He is the most successful Para Swimmer in history. As of February 2013, he holds the S13 long course world records in 100, 200 and 400 metre freestyle, 50 and 100 metre backstroke and 200 metres individual medley events. In 2018, he was named the World Disabled Male Swimmer of the Year by Swimming World.
