= Charl Bouwer =

South African Paralympic swimmer

Medal record

Swimming

Representing South Africa

Paralympic Games
Gold medal – first place	2008 Beijing	400 metre freestyle - S13
Gold medal – first place	2012 London	50 metre freestyle - S13
Silver medal – second place	2012 London	100 metre freestyle - S13
Silver medal – second place	2012 London	100 metre backstroke - S13

Charles "Charl" Bouwer (born 27 March 1990) is a paralympic swimmer from South Africa competing in category S13 events. He was born in Kimberley.

== Swimming career ==
=== Paralympics ===
At the 2004 Summer Paralympics he competed in the 100m backstroke, 200m individual medley and 400m freestyle.

At the 2008 Summer Paralympics he competed in S13 100m butterfly, 400m freestyle, 100m freestyle, 100m backstroke, 50m freestyle. He won gold and set a new world record in the 400m freestyle.

At the 2012 Summer Paralympics he participated in the S13 class Men's 50m, 100m and 400m freestyle; 100m butterfly; 100m backstroke and the SM13 Men's 200m individual medley. He won gold in the 50m freestyle.
