= Danylo Chufarov =

Ukrainian Paralympic swimmer

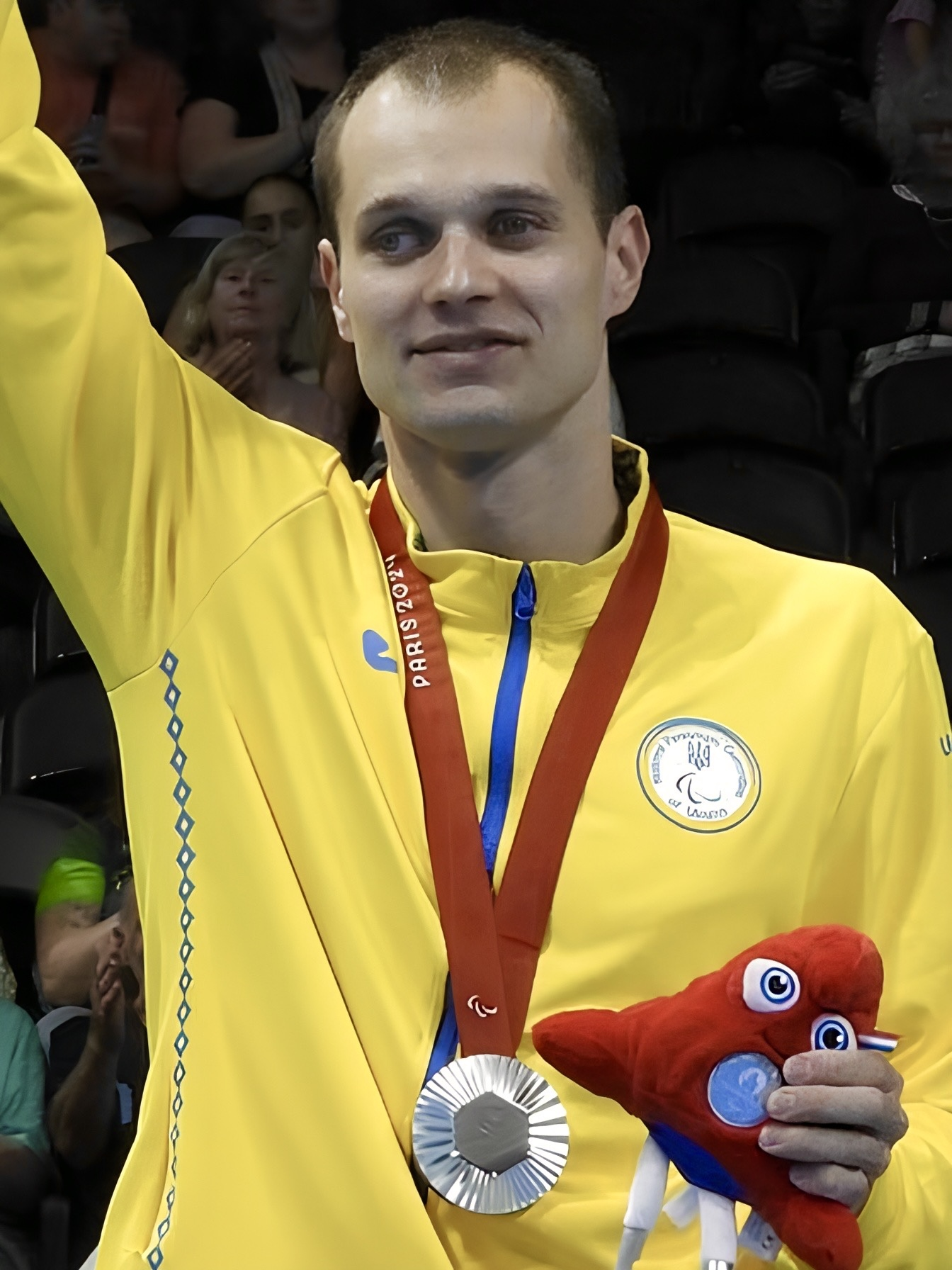
- Chufarov at the 2024 Summer Paralympics

Personal information
- Born: 15 July 1989 (age 37) Mariupol, Ukrainian SSR, Soviet Union

Sport
- Sport: Swimming
- Classifications: S13
Medal record
Men's para swimming
Representing Ukraine
Paralympic Games
Silver medal – second place	2008 Beijing	400 m freestyle S13
Silver medal – second place	2012 London	400 m freestyle S13
Silver medal – second place	2024 Paris	100 m butterfly S11
Silver medal – second place	2024 Paris	200 m medley SM11
Bronze medal – third place	2008 Beijing	100 m freestyle S13
Bronze medal – third place	2012 London	200 m medley SM13
Bronze medal – third place	2016 Rio de Janeiro	200 m medley SM13
Bronze medal – third place	2024 Paris	100 m backstroke S11
Bronze medal – third place	2024 Paris	100 m breaststroke SB11
World Championships
Gold medal – first place	2013 Montreal	200 m medley SM12
Gold medal – first place	2013 Montreal	400 m freestyle S12
Gold medal – first place	2023 Manchester	100 m butterfly S11
Gold medal – first place	2023 Manchester	100 m freestyle S11
Gold medal – first place	2023 Manchester	200 m medley SM11
Gold medal – first place	2025 Singapore	200 m medley SM11
Silver medal – second place	2010 Eindhoven	4×100 m medley 49pts
Silver medal – second place	2013 Montreal	100 m butterfly S12
Silver medal – second place	2018 Dublin	200 m medley S12
Silver medal – second place	2018 Dublin	400 m freestyle S12
Silver medal – second place	2023 Manchester	100 m breaststroke SB11
Silver medal – second place	2025 Singapore	100 m breaststroke SB11
Silver medal – second place	2025 Singapore	100 m freestyle S11
Bronze medal – third place	2010 Eindhoven	400 m freestyle S13
Bronze medal – third place	2010 Eindhoven	100 m butterfly S13
Bronze medal – third place	2013 Montreal	100 m freestyle S12
Bronze medal – third place	2018 Dublin	100 m breaststroke SB12
Bronze medal – third place	2025 Singapore	100 m backstroke S11
European Championships
Gold medal – first place	2009 Reykjavik	100 m butterfly S13
Gold medal – first place	2009 Reykjavik	400 m freestyle S13
Gold medal – first place	2014 Eindhoven	400 m freestyle S12
Silver medal – second place	2009 Reykjavik	200 m medley SM13
Silver medal – second place	2014 Eindhoven	200 m medley SM12
Silver medal – second place	2024 Madeira	100 m breaststroke SB11
Silver medal – second place	2024 Madeira	100 m freestyle S11
Silver medal – second place	2024 Madeira	200 m ind. medley S11
Silver medal – second place	2026 Kocaeli	100 m butterfly S11
Bronze medal – third place	2009 Reykjavik	100 m backstroke S13
Bronze medal – third place	2024 Madeira	400 m freestyle S11
Bronze medal – third place	2026 Kocaeli	200 m medley SM11

Danylo Chufarov (Ukrainian: Данило Володимирович Чуфаров; born 15 July 1989) is a Ukrainian paralympic swimmer competing mainly in category S13 events.

== Career ==
Chufarov was part of the Ukrainian team that travelled to Beijing for the 2008 Summer Paralympics where he competed in five events. He missed the final of the 50m freestyle by one place, finished fourth in the 100m butterfly, fourth in the 200m individual medley, he won bronze in the 100m freestyle and finished second in the 400m freestyle behind the world record set by South Africa's Charl Bouwer.

At the 2023 Allianz Para Swimming World Championship in Manchester he secured three gold medals, one silver and set two world records. It was even more remarkable as Chufarov’s previous world championship gold medal was back in 2013.

Danylo Chufarov won bronze medal, at the 2024 Paralympics in Paris, in the men’s S11 100 m backstroke.

== Filmography ==
He was featured in Mstyslav Chernov's film 20 Days in Mariupol.

== Personal life ==
Chufarov was born on 15 July 1989 in Mariupol, and is married to Yaryna Matlo.
