= Sean Russo =

Australian Paralympic swimmer

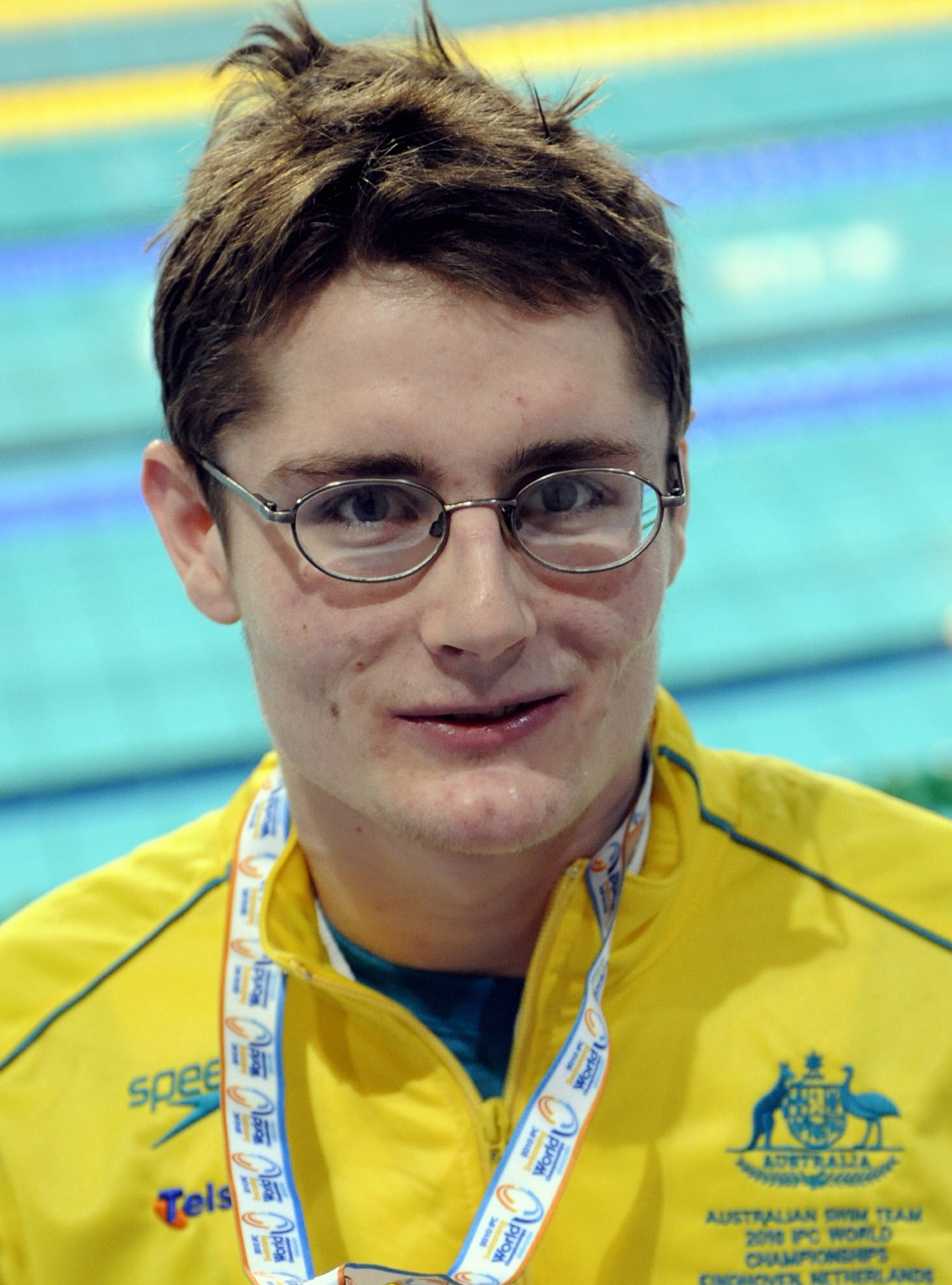
- Russo at the 2010 IPC Swimming World Championships, where he won a bronze medal in the 100m backstroke

Personal information
- Full name: Sean Russo
- Nationality: Australia
- Born: 5 April 1991 (age 35) Sydney, New South Wales

Sport
- Sport: Swimming
- Strokes: Freestyle, backstroke
- Classifications: S13, SB13, SM13
Medal record
Men's paralympic swimming
Representing Australia
World Championships (LC)
Bronze medal – third place	2010 Eindhoven	100 m backstroke S13
Bronze medal – third place	2015 Glasgow	100 m backstroke S13

Sean Russo (born 5 April 1991) is an Australian swimmer. He represented Australia at the 2012 London and 2016 Rio Paralympics.

== Personal ==
Russo was born on 5 April 1991 and has retinitis pigmentosa. As a child, he also had asthma. He resides in Revesby, New South Wales. In 2017, he is currently completing a Certificate III and Certificate IV of Dental Assisting.

== Swimming ==
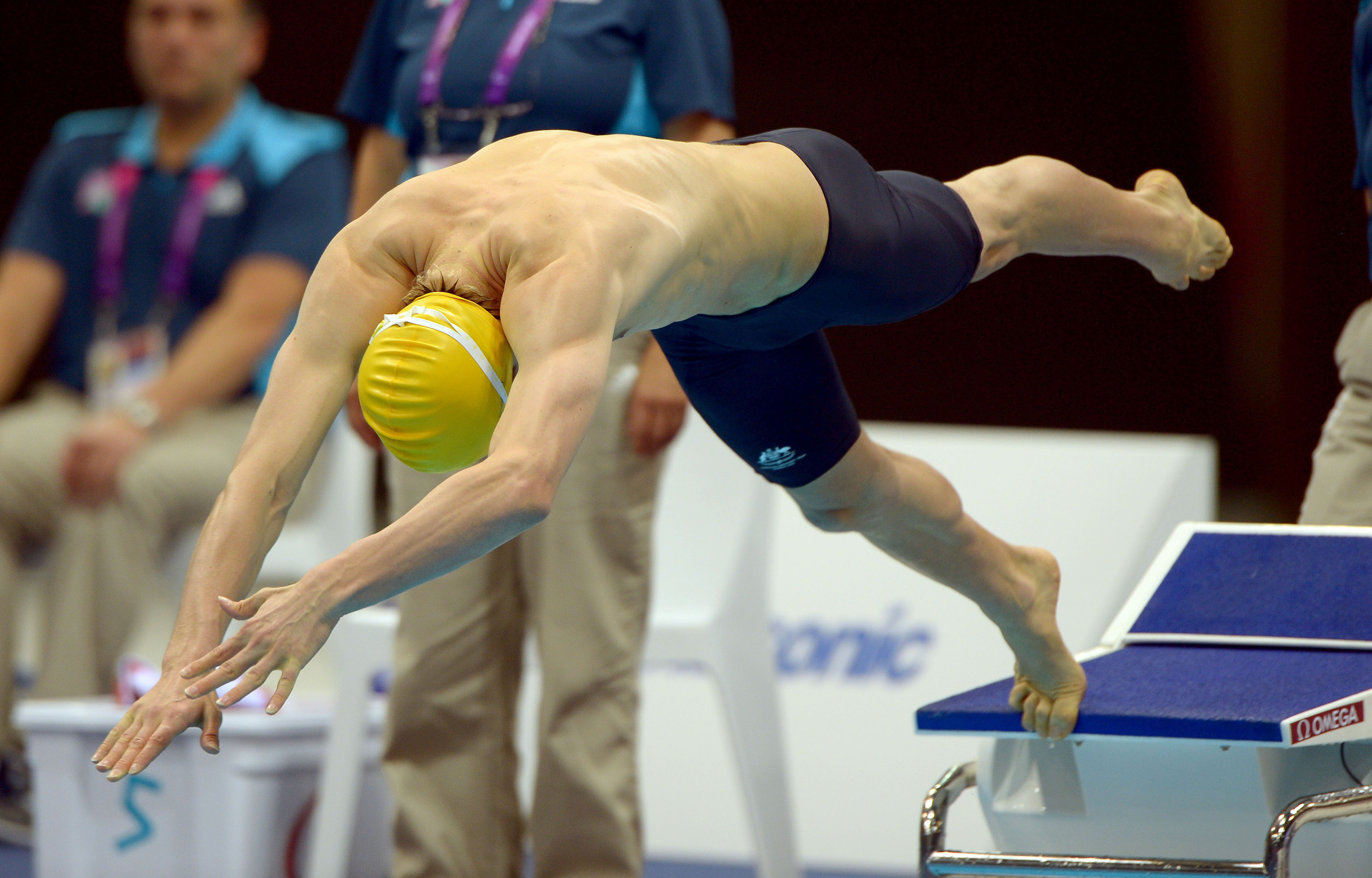
Russo at the 2012 London Paralympics

Russo is an S13 classified swimmer. He started competing in swimming in 1995 as a result of asthma. He made his national team debut in 2010 at the IPC Swimming World Championships, competing in the 100m backstroke where he earned a bronze medal. At the event, he also set Australian records in the 100m freestyle and 100m butterfly events.

He was a member of the Australian team competing at the Dutch hosted 2011 IPC World Swimming Championships. Finishing with a personal best time of 1:02.52 in the men's 100m backstroke, he earned a silver medal.

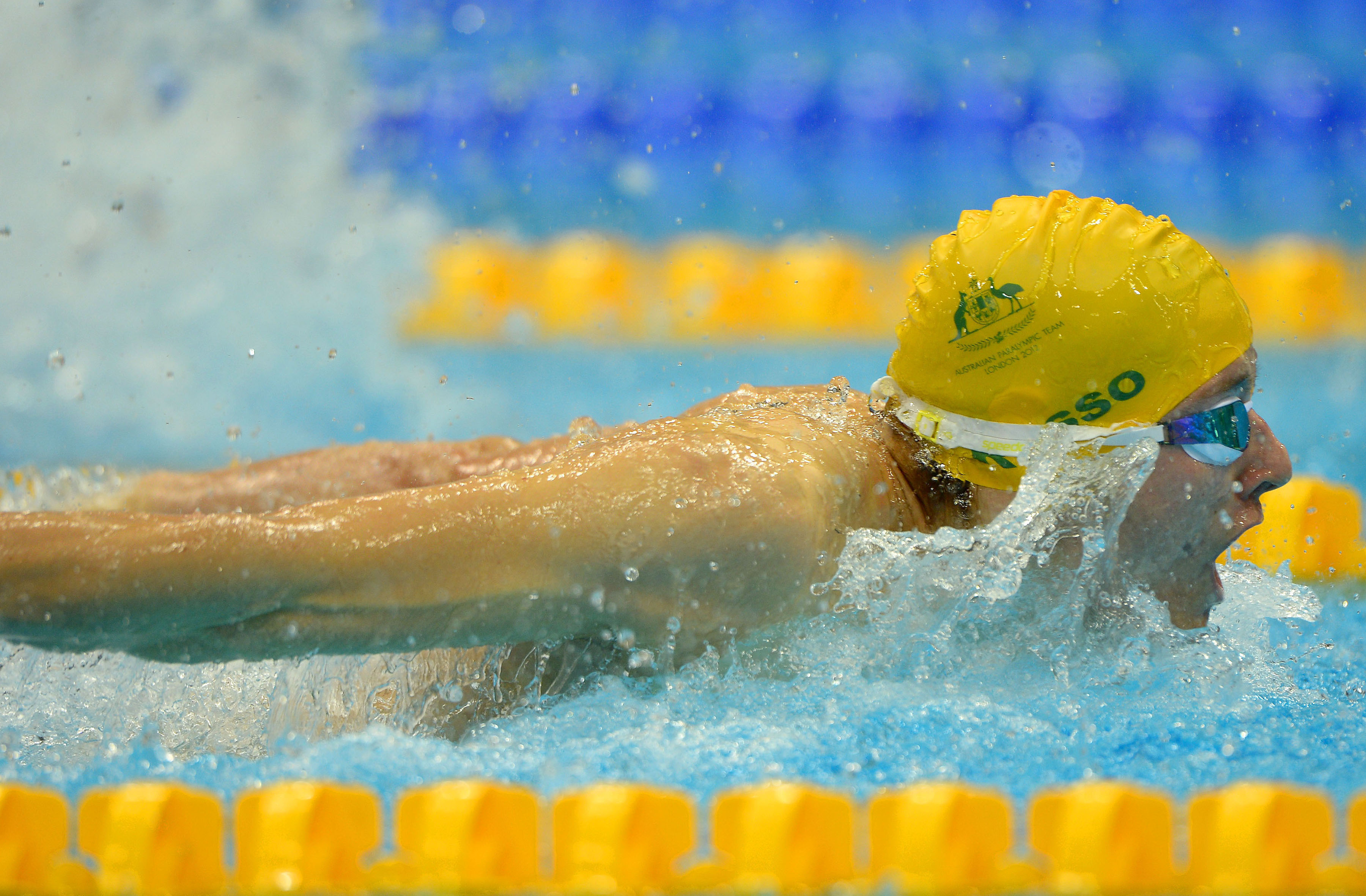

At the 2012 Australian national championships, he finished first in the men's 50m backstroke multi-disability event. He was selected to represent Australia at the 2012 Summer Paralympics in swimming in seven events: the Men's 100 m Backstroke S13, 100 m Breaststroke SB13, 100 m Butterfly S13, 100 m Freestyle S13, 200 m Individual Medley SM13, 400 m Freestyle S13 and 50 m Freestyle S13. He set an Oceania Record in the 100 m Backstroke S13.

At the 2015 IPC Swimming World Championships in Glasgow, Scotland, he won a bronze medal in Men's 100 m Backstroke S13. He finished fifth in the Men's 100m Breaststroke SB13, seventh in the Men's 200m Individual Medley SM13 and ninth in the Men's 400m Freestyle S13.

In 2015, he is a New South Institute of Sport scholarship holder.

Russo competed at the 2016 Rio Paralympics and competed in six events. He placed seventh in Men's 100m Breaststroke SB13, fifth in the Men's 100m Backstroke S13 and sixth in Men's 200m Individual Medley SM13. He also competed in Men's 50m Freestyle S13, Men's 100m Freestyle S13 and Men's 100m Butterfly S13 but didn't progress to the finals.
