= S13 (classification) =

Para-swimming classifications

S13, SB13, SM13 are Para swimming classifications used for categorising swimmers based on their level of disability. Jane Buckley, writing for the Sporting Wheelies, describes the swimmers in this classification as having: "Swimmers who are the most sighted but are considered to be blind according to the IBSA B3."

== History ==
The classification was created by the International Paralympic Committee. In 2003 the committee approved a plan which recommended the development of a universal classification code. The code was approved in 2007, and defines the "objective of classification as developing and implementing accurate, reliable and consistent sport focused classification systems", which are known as "evidence based, sport specific classification". In November 2015, they approved the revised classification code, which "aims to further develop evidence based, sport specific classification in all sports".

For the 2016 Summer Paralympics in Rio, the International Paralympic Committee had a zero classification at the Games policy. This policy was put into place in 2014, with the goal of avoiding last minute changes in classes that would negatively impact athlete training preparations. All competitors needed to be internationally classified with their classification status confirmed prior to the Games, with exceptions to this policy being dealt with on a case-by-case basis.

== Sport ==
This classification is for swimming. In the classification title, S represents Freestyle, Backstroke and Butterfly strokes. SB means breaststroke. SM means individual medley. Jane Buckley, writing for the Sporting Wheelies, describes the swimmers in this classification as having: "Swimmers who are the most sighted but are considered to be blind according to the IBSA B3."

== Getting classified ==
Internationally, the classification is done by the International Blind Sports Association. In Australia, to be classified in this category, athletes contact the Australian Paralympic Committee or their state swimming governing body. In the United States, classification is handled by the United States Paralympic Committee on a national level. The classification test has three components: "a bench test, a water test, observation during competition." American swimmers are assessed by four people: a medical classifier, two general classifiers and a technical classifier.

== Competitions ==
For this classification, organisers of the Paralympic Games have the option of including the following events on the Paralympic programme: 50 m, 100 m and 400 m Freestyle, 100 m Backstroke, 100 m Breaststroke, 100 m Butterfly, 200 m Individual Medley, and 4 × 100 m Freestyle Relay and 4 × 100 m Medley Relay.

== Records ==
In the S13 50 m Freestyle Long Course, the men's world record is held by Oleksii Fedyna and the women's world record is held by Yvonne Hopf. In the S13 100 m Freestyle Long Course, the men's world record is held by South Africa's Charles Bouwer and the women's world record is held by Canada's Valerie Grand-Maison. In the SB13 100 m breaststroke, the women's world record is held by Fotimakhon Amilova.

== Competitors ==
Swimmers who have competed in this classification include Dmytro Aleksyeyev, Kelley Becherer and Charl Bouwer who all won medals in their class at the 2008 Paralympics.

American swimmers who have been classified by the United States Paralympic Committee as being in this class include Gia Pergolini, Eric Chausse, Natalio Abar, and Blake Adams.

== See also ==
- Para swimming classification
- Swimming at the Summer Paralympics
- Swimming at the 2008 Summer Paralympics – Men's 100 metre butterfly S13
