= Swimming at the 2020 Summer Paralympics – Men's 50 metre freestyle S13 =

Men's 50 metre freestyle S13 at the XVI Paralympic Games
- Venue: Tokyo Aquatics Centre
- Dates: 29 August 2021
- Competitors: 16 from 10 nations

Medalists
1st place, gold medalist(s)		Ihar Boki	Belarus
2nd place, silver medalist(s)		Illia Yaremenko	Ukraine
3rd place, bronze medalist(s)		Maksym Veraksa	Ukraine

The men's 50 metre freestyle S13 event at the 2020 Paralympic Games took place on 29 August 2021, at the Tokyo Aquatics Centre.

== Heats ==
The swimmers with the top eight times, regardless of heat, advanced to the final.

Rank	Heat	Lane	Name	Nationality	Time	Notes
1	2	4	Ihar Boki	Belarus	23.44	Q, PR
2	1	4	Islam Aslanov	Uzbekistan	23.90	Q
3	2	5	Illia Yaremenko	Ukraine	23.95	Q
4	1	5	Maksym Veraksa	Ukraine	23.97	Q
5	1	6	Raman Salei	Azerbaijan	23.98	Q
6	1	3	Oleksii Virchenko	Ukraine	24.13	Q
7	2	6	Dzmitry Salei	Belarus	24.42	Q
8	1	2	Nicolas-Guy Turbide	Canada	24.54	Q
9	2	3	Muzaffar Tursunkhujaev	Uzbekistan	24.62	
10	2	2	Taliso Engel	Germany	24.70	
11	2	7	Alex Portal	France	25.03	
12	1	7	Douglas Matera	Brazil	25.14	
13	1	1	Daniel Giraldo Correa	Colombia	25.62	
14	2	1	Uladzimir Sotnikau	Belarus	25.73	
15	2	8	Roman Agalakov	Kazakhstan	25.82	
16	1	1	Nurdaulet Zhumagali	Kazakhstan	28.88	

== Final ==
50m freestyle final
Rank	Lane	Name	Nationality	Time	Notes
1st place, gold medalist(s)	4	Ihar Boki	Belarus	23.21	PR
2nd place, silver medalist(s)	3	Illia Yaremenko	Ukraine	23.70	
3rd place, bronze medalist(s)	6	Maksym Veraksa	Ukraine	23.83	
4	2	Raman Salei	Azerbaijan	23.85	
5	5	Islam Aslanov	Uzbekistan	23.85	
6	1	Dzmitry Salei	Belarus	24.23	
7	7	Oleksii Virchenko	Ukraine	24.29	
8	8	Nicolas-Guy Turbide	Canada	24.59	
