= Swimming at the 2020 Summer Paralympics – Men's 100 metre backstroke S13 =

Men's 100 metre backstroke S13 at the XVI Paralympic Games
- Venue: Tokyo Aquatics Centre
- Dates: 26 August 2021
- Competitors: 12 from 9 nations
- Winning time: 56.36

Medalists
1st place, gold medalist(s)		Ihar Boki	Belarus
2nd place, silver medalist(s)		Nicolas-Guy Turbide	Canada
3rd place, bronze medalist(s)		Vladimir Sotnikov	RPC

The Men's 100 metre backstroke S13 event at the 2020 Paralympic Games took place on 26 August 2021, at the Tokyo Aquatics Centre.

== Results ==
=== Heats ===
The swimmers with the top 8 times, regardless of heat, advanced to the final.

Rank	Heat	Lane	Name	Nationality	Time	Notes
1	2	4	Ihar Boki	Belarus	57.67	Q
2	2	5	Thomas van Wanrooij	Netherlands	1:00.48	Q
3	1	4	Nicolas-Guy Turbide	Canada	1:01.08	Q
4	1	5	Oleksii Virchenko	Ukraine	1:02.00	Q
5	2	3	Vladimir Sotnikov	RPC	1:02.05	Q
6	1	3	Kyrylo Garashchenko	Ukraine	1:03.36	Q
7	1	6	Genki Saito	Japan	1:03.44	Q
8	2	6	Antti Latikka	Finland	1:03.75	Q
9	2	2	Muzaffar Tursunkhujaev	Uzbekistan	1:05.26	
10	1	2	Uladzimir Sotnikau	Belarus	1:06.21	
11	2	7	Islam Aslanov	Uzbekistan	1:06.52	
12	1	7	Gerasimos Lignos	Greece	1:06.76	

=== Final ===
Rank	Lane	Name	Nationality	Time	Notes
1st place, gold medalist(s)	4	Ihar Boki	Belarus	56.36	WR
2nd place, silver medalist(s)	3	Nicolas-Guy Turbide	Canada	59.70	
3rd place, bronze medalist(s)	2	Vladimir Sotnikov	RPC	59.86	
4	6	Oleksii Virchenko	Ukraine	1:00.48	
5	5	Thomas van Wanrooij	Netherlands	1:00.50	
6	7	Kyrylo Garashchenko	Ukraine	1:02.13	
7	8	Antti Latikka	Finland	1:04.21	
8	1	Genki Saito	Japan	1:04.56	
