= Swimming at the 2020 Summer Paralympics =

Swimming at the XVI Paralympic Games
- Swimming pictogram of the 2020 Summer Paralympics
- Venue: Tokyo Aquatics Centre
- Dates: 25 August to 4 September, 2021
- Competitors: 620 in 146 events

Swimming at the 2020 Summer Paralympics was held at the Tokyo Aquatics Centre. There were 146 events (76 male, 67 female, 3 mixed relay events) - six fewer events than the 2016 Summer Paralympics. Swimming is the second largest sport: behind athletics and ahead of table tennis.

The 2020 Summer Olympic and Paralympic Games were postponed to 2021 due to the COVID-19 pandemic. They kept the 2020 name and were held from 24 August to 5 September 2021.

== Qualification ==
Qualification starts from 1 October 2018 and finishes on 1 August 2021.

=== Classes ===
There are three swimming sport class prefixes for swimming strokes:

- S is for freestyle, butterfly and backstroke events.
- SB is for breaststroke
- SM is for individual medley events.

As well as swimming strokes, they are also divided into ten different categories:

- S1/SB1: swimmers who may have tetraplegia or some form of loss of muscular power in their legs, arms and hands. These swimmers would regularly use a wheelchair.
- S2/SB1: swimmers who may have limited function in their hands, but no use of trunk and legs and mainly rely on their arms to swim.
- S3/SB2: swimmers who have leg and arm amputations, have severe coordination problems in their limbs or are able to swim with their arms but don't use their trunk or legs.
- S4/SB3: swimmers who have function in their hands and arms but can't use their trunk or legs to swim or they have three amputated limbs.
- S5/SB4: swimmers who have hemiplegia, paraplegia or short stature.
- S6/SB5: swimmers who have short stature or arm amputations or some form of coordination problem on one side of their body.
- S7/SB6: swimmers who have one leg and one arm amputation on opposite side or paralysis on one side of their body. These swimmers have full control of their arms and trunk but variable function in their legs.
- S8/SB7: swimmers who have a single amputation or restrictive movement in their hip, knee and ankle joints.
- S9/SB8: swimmers who have joint restrictions in one leg or double below-the-knee amputations.
- S10/SB9: swimmers who have minor physical impairments, for example, loss of one hand.
- S11/SB11: swimmers who have severe visual impairments and have very low or no light perception, such as blindness, they are required to wear blackened goggles to compete. They use tappers when competing in swimming events.
- S12/SB12: swimmers who have moderate visual impairment and have a visual field of less than 5 degrees radius. They are required to wear blackened goggles to compete. They may wish to use a tapper.
- S13/SB13: swimmers who have minor visual impairment and have high visual acuity. They are required to wear blackened goggles to compete. They may wish to use a tapper.
- S14/SB14: swimmers who have intellectual impairment.

For relay races, the sum of their individual swimmers' classes must not exceed the stated points total. For example, three S8 swimmers and an S10 swimmer is a valid combination for 34-point freestyle relay (8 + 8 + 8 + 10 = 34).

== Qualified nations ==
As of March 2020.

- Argentina (9)
- Australia (32)
- Austria (3)
- Azerbaijan (3)
- Belarus (10)
- Belgium (1)
- Brazil (35)
- Canada (19)
- Chile (2)
- China (42)
- Colombia (11)
- Croatia (3)
- Cuba (1)
- Cyprus (1)
- Czech Republic (5)
- Denmark (1)
- Egypt (3)
- Estonia (3)
- Finland (2)
- France (9)
- Germany (15)
- Great Britain (33)
- Greece (10)
- Hong Kong (4)
- Hungary (7)
- Iceland (2)
- India (2)
- Indonesia (2)
- Ireland (4)
- Israel (8)
- Italy (29)
- Japan (27)
- Kazakhstan (6)
- Latvia (1)
- Lithuania (1)
- Malaysia (3)
- Mexico (18)
- Myanmar (1)
- Netherlands (15)
- New Zealand (6)
- Norway (3)
- Peru (1)
- Philippines (2)
- Poland (8)
- Portugal (5)
- RPC (51)
- Singapore (3)
- Slovakia (1)
- Slovenia (1)
- South Africa (4)
- South Korea (5)
- Spain (24)
- Sweden (2)
- Switzerland (2)
- Thailand (2)
- Turkey (4)
- Ukraine (40)
- United States (34)
- Uzbekistan (7)
- Venezuela (1)
- Vietnam (4)

== Schedule ==
●	Finals

August / September	25	26	27	28	29	30	31	1	2	3	Total
Final	16	14	14	14	13	15	14	15	15	16	146
Cumulative Total	16	30	44	58	71	86	100	115	130	146	

All heat events take place during the morning sessions from 9:00 to 11:45 and the finals take place during the evening sessions from 17:00 to 21:00 on the same day.

Event		Dates									
Event		Wed 25 Aug	Thurs 26 Aug	Fri 27 Aug	Sat 28 Aug	Sun 29 Aug	Mon 30 Aug	Tues 31 Aug	Wed 1 Sept	Thurs 2 Sept	Fri 3 Sept
50m freestyle	Men; Details	S10		S11		S9; S13		S7	S5	S3; S4	
50m freestyle	Women; Details	S6; S10		S11		S13			S8	S4	
100m freestyle	Men; Details	S8	S4; S5		S10			S12	S6		
100m freestyle	Women; Details		S5		S10		S3	S7; S9; S12			S11
200m freestyle	Men; Details	S5		S14		S2	S4				S3
200m freestyle	Women; Details	S5		S14							
400m freestyle	Men; Details	S9	S11	S13		S7		S8	S10	S6	
400m freestyle	Women; Details	S9	S11	S13		S7		S8	S10	S6	
50m backstroke	Men; Details					S3	S5			S1; S2	S4
50m backstroke	Women; Details					S3	S5			S2	S4
100m backstroke	Men; Details	S1; S2	S13	S8; S12	S11		S7; S9			S10; S14	S6
100m backstroke	Women; Details	S2	S13	S8; S12	S11		S7; S9			S10; S14	S6
50m breaststroke	Men; Details	SB3						SB2			
50m breaststroke	Women; Details							SB3			
100m breaststroke	Men; Details		SB8; SB9		SB5; SB6	SB4; SB14			SB7; SB11; SB12; SB13		
100m breaststroke	Women; Details		SB8; SB9		SB5; SB6	SB4; SB14			SB7; SB11; SB12; SB13		
50m butterfly	Men; Details			S5			S6				S7
50m butterfly	Women; Details			S5			S6				S7
100m butterfly	Men; Details	S13; S14						S10		S9	S8; S11; S12
100m butterfly	Women; Details	S13; S14						S10		S9	S8
150m individual medley	Men; Details				SM3; SM4						
150m individual medley	Women; Details				SM4						
200m individual medley	Men; Details		SM6	SM7	SM8		SM11; SM13	SM14	SM9		SM10
200m individual medley	Women; Details		SM6	SM7	SM8		SM11; SM13	SM14	SM9		SM5; SM10
Freestyle relay Details			Mixed; 4x50m 20 points		Mixed; 4x100m S14	Women's; 4x100m 34 points	Men's; 4x100m 34 points	Mixed; 4x100m 49 points			
Medley relay Details										Women's; 4x100m 34 points	Men's; 4x100m 34 points

== Results ==
=== Men ===
==== Freestyle ====
Event	Class	Gold	Silver	Bronze
50 m	S3	(Mexico) Diego López Díaz	(China) Zou Liankang	(Ukraine) Denys Ostapchenko
50 m	S4	(Israel) Ami Omer Dadaon	(Japan) Takayuki Suzuki	(Italy) Luigi Beggiato
50 m	S5	(China) Zheng Tao	(China) Yuan Weiyi	(China) Wang Lichao
50 m	S7	(Ukraine) Andrii Trusov	(Colombia) Carlos Serrano Zárate	(Ukraine) Yevhenii Bohodaiko
50 m	S9	(Italy) Simone Barlaam	(International Paralympic Committee) Denis Tarasov	(United States) Jamal Hill
50 m	S10	(Australia) Rowan Crothers	(Ukraine) Maksym Krypak	(Brazil) Phelipe Rodrigues
50 m	S11	(Brazil) Wendell Belarmino	(China) Hua Dongdong	(Lithuania) Edgaras Matakas
50 m	S13	(Belarus) Ihar Boki	(Ukraine) Illia Yaremenko	(Ukraine) Maksym Veraksa
100 m	S4	(Japan) Takayuki Suzuki	(Italy) Luigi Beggiato	(International Paralympic Committee) Roman Zhdanov
100 m	S5	(Italy) Francesco Bocciardo	(China) Wang Lichao	(Brazil) Daniel Dias
100 m	S6	(Italy) Antonio Fantin	(Colombia) Nelson Crispín	(Brazil) Talisson Glock
100 m	S8	(Australia) Ben Popham	(International Paralympic Committee) Andrei Nikolaev	(Greece) Dimosthenis Michalentzakis
100 m	S10	(Ukraine) Maksym Krypak	(Australia) Rowan Crothers	(Italy) Stefano Raimondi
100 m	S12	(Azerbaijan) Raman Salei	(Ukraine) Maksym Veraksa	(United Kingdom) Stephen Clegg
200 m	S2	(Brazil) Gabriel Araújo	(Chile) Alberto Abarza	(International Paralympic Committee) Vladimir Danilenko
200 m	S3	(Ukraine) Denys Ostapchenko	(Mexico) Diego López Díaz	(Mexico) Jesús Hernández Hernández
200 m	S4	(Israel) Ami Omer Dadaon	(Japan) Takayuki Suzuki	(International Paralympic Committee) Roman Zhdanov
200 m	S5	(Italy) Francesco Bocciardo	(Spain) Antoni Ponce Bertran	(Brazil) Daniel Dias
200 m	S14	(United Kingdom) Reece Dunn	(Brazil) Gabriel Bandeira	(International Paralympic Committee) Viacheslav Emeliantsev
400 m	S6	(Brazil) Talisson Glock	(Italy) Antonio Fantin	(International Paralympic Committee) Viacheslav Lenskii
400 m	S7	(Israel) Mark Malyar	(Ukraine) Andrii Trusov	(United States) Evan Austin
400 m	S8	(International Paralympic Committee) Andrei Nikolaev	(Italy) Alberto Amodeo	(United States) Matthew Torres
400 m	S9	(Australia) William Martin	(France) Ugo Didier	(Australia) Alexander Tuckfield
400 m	S10	(Ukraine) Maksym Krypak	(Netherlands) Bas Takken	(Australia) Thomas Gallagher
400 m	S11	(Netherlands) Rogier Dorsman	(Japan) Uchu Tomita	(China) Hua Dongdong
400 m	S13	(Belarus) Ihar Boki	(Ukraine) Kyrylo Garashchenko	(France) Alex Portal

==== Backstroke ====
Event	Class	Gold	Silver	Bronze
50 m	S1	(Israel) Iyad Shalabi	(Ukraine) Anton Kol	(Italy) Francesco Bettella
50 m	S2	(Brazil) Gabriel Araújo	(Chile) Alberto Abarza	(International Paralympic Committee) Vladimir Danilenko
50 m	S3	(China) Zou Liankang	(Ukraine) Denys Ostapchenko	(Mexico) Diego López Díaz
50 m	S4	(International Paralympic Committee) Roman Zhdanov	(Czech Republic) Arnošt Petráček	(Mexico) Ángel de Jesús Camacho
50 m	S5	(China) Zheng Tao	(China) Ruan Jingsong	(China) Wang Lichao
100 m	S1	(Israel) Iyad Shalabi	(Ukraine) Anton Kol	(Italy) Francesco Bettella
100 m	S2	(Chile) Alberto Abarza	(Brazil) Gabriel Araújo	(International Paralympic Committee) Vladimir Danilenko
100 m	S6	(China) Jia Hongguang	(Argentina) Matías de Andrade	(Croatia) Dino Sinovčić
100 m	S7	(Ukraine) Andrii Trusov	(Argentina) Pipo Carlomagno	(Israel) Mark Malyar
100 m	S8	(United States) Robert Griswold	(Spain) Inigo Llopis Sanz	(China) Liu Fengqi
100 m	S9	(International Paralympic Committee) Bogdan Mozgovoi	(Belarus) Yahor Shchalkanau	(Australia) Timothy Hodge
100 m	S10	(Ukraine) Maksym Krypak	(Italy) Stefano Raimondi	(France) Florent Marais
100 m	S11	(Ukraine) Mykhailo Serbin	(Ukraine) Viktor Smyrnov	(China) Yang Bozun
100 m	S12	(Azerbaijan) Raman Salei	(Ukraine) Sergii Klippert	(United Kingdom) Stephen Clegg
100 m	S13	(Belarus) Ihar Boki	(Canada) Nicolas Guy Turbide	(International Paralympic Committee) Vladimir Sotnikov
100 m	S14	(Australia) Benjamin Hance	(International Paralympic Committee) Viacheslav Emeliantsev	(United Kingdom) Reece Dunn

==== Breaststroke ====
Event	Class	Gold	Silver	Bronze
50 m
50 m	SB2	(Mexico) José Arnulfo Castorena	(Australia) Grant Patterson	(Mexico) Jesús Hernández Hernández
50 m	SB3	(International Paralympic Committee) Roman Zhdanov	(Spain) Miguel Luque	(Japan) Takayuki Suzuki
100 m
100 m	SB4	(International Paralympic Committee) Dmitrii Cherniaev	(Colombia) Moisés Fuentes	(Greece) Antonios Tsapatakis
100 m	SB5	(International Paralympic Committee) Andrei Granichka	(Spain) Antoni Ponce Bertran	(China) Li Junsheng
100 m	SB6	(Ukraine) Yevhenii Bohodaiko	(Colombia) Nelson Crispín	(Australia) Matthew Levy
100 m	SB7	(Colombia) Carlos Serrano Zárate	(International Paralympic Committee) Egor Efrosinin	(Australia) Blake Cochrane
100 m	SB8	(International Paralympic Committee) Andrei Kalina	(Spain) Oscar Salguero	(China) Yang Guanglong
100 m	SB9	(Italy) Stefano Raimondi	(International Paralympic Committee) Artem Isaev	(International Paralympic Committee) Dmitrii Bartasinskii
100 m	SB11	(Netherlands) Rogier Dorsman	(Japan) Keiichi Kimura	(China) Yang Bozun
100 m	SB12	(Azerbaijan) Vali Israfilov	(Ukraine) Oleksii Fedyna	(International Paralympic Committee) Artur Saifutdinov
100 m	SB13	(Germany) Taliso Engel	(United States) David Abrahams	(Kazakhstan) Nurdaulet Zhumagali
100 m	SB14	(Japan) Naohide Yamaguchi	(Australia) Jake Michel	(United Kingdom) Scott Quin

==== Butterfly ====
Event	Class	Gold	Silver	Bronze
50 m
50 m	S5	(China) Zheng Tao	(China) Wang Lichao	(China) Yuan Weiyi
50 m	S6	(China) Wang Jingang	(China) Jia Hongguang	(Colombia) Nelson Crispín
50 m	S7	(United States) Evan Austin	(Ukraine) Andrii Trusov	(Colombia) Carlos Serrano Zárate
100 m
100 m	S8	(United States) Robert Griswold	(China) Yang Feng	(Ukraine) Denys Dubrov
100 m	S9	(Australia) William Martin	(Italy) Simone Barlaam	(International Paralympic Committee) Alexander Skaliukh
100 m	S10	(Ukraine) Maksym Krypak	(Italy) Stefano Raimondi	(Australia) Col Pearse
100 m	S11	(Japan) Keiichi Kimura	(Japan) Uchu Tomita	(Brazil) Wendell Belarmino
100 m	S12	(Azerbaijan) Raman Salei	(United Kingdom) Stephen Clegg	(International Paralympic Committee) Roman Makarov
100 m	S13	(Belarus) Ihar Boki	(Ukraine) Oleksii Virchenko	(Uzbekistan) Islam Aslanov
100 m	S14	(Brazil) Gabriel Bandeira	(United Kingdom) Reece Dunn	(Australia) Benjamin Hance

==== Medley ====
Event	Class	Gold	Silver	Bronze
150 m
150 m	SM3	(Mexico) Jesús Hernández	(Australia) Ahmed Kelly	(Australia) Grant Patterson
150 m	SM4	(International Paralympic Committee) Roman Zhdanov	(Israel) Ami Omer Dadaon	(Japan) Takayuki Suzuki
200 m
200 m	SM6	(Colombia) Nelson Crispín	(International Paralympic Committee) Andrei Granichka	(China) Jia Hongguang
200 m	SM7	(Israel) Mark Malyar	(Ukraine) Andrii Trusov	(Colombia) Carlos Serrano Zárate
200 m	SM8	(Ukraine) Denys Dubrov	(China) Xu Haijiao	(China) Yang Guanglong
200 m	SM9	(International Paralympic Committee) Andrei Kalina	(Australia) Timothy Hodge	(France) Ugo Didier
200 m	SM10	(Ukraine) Maksym Krypak	(Italy) Stefano Raimondi	(Netherlands) Bas Takken
200 m	SM11	(Netherlands) Rogier Dorsman	(Ukraine) Mykhailo Serbin	(Japan) Uchu Tomita
200 m	SM13	(Belarus) Ihar Boki	(France) Alex Portal	(Netherlands) Thomas van Wanrooij
200 m	SM14	(United Kingdom) Reece Dunn	(Brazil) Gabriel Bandeira	(Ukraine) Vasyl Krainyk

=== Women ===
==== Freestyle ====
Event	Class	Gold	Silver	Bronze
50 m
50 m	S4	(Australia) Rachael Watson	(Italy) Arjola Trimi	(Spain) Marta Fernández Infante
50 m	S6	(Ukraine) Yelyzaveta Mereshko	(United States) Elizabeth Marks	(Ukraine) Anna Hontar
50 m	S8	(International Paralympic Committee) Viktoriia Ishchiulova	(Brazil) Cecília Jerônimo de Araújo	(Italy) Xenia Palazzo
50 m	S9	(Italy) Simone Barlaam	(International Paralympic Committee) Denis Tarasov	(United States) Jamal Hill
50 m	S10	(International Paralympic Committee) Anastasiia Gontar	(Netherlands) Chantalle Zijderveld	(Canada) Aurélie Rivard
50 m	S11	(China) Ma Jia	(China) Li Guizhi	(Cyprus) Karolina Pelendritou
50 m	S13	(Brazil) Carol Santiago	(International Paralympic Committee) Anna Krivshina	(Italy) Carlotta Gilli
100 m
100 m	S3	(Italy) Arjola Trimi	(United States) Leanne Smith	(International Paralympic Committee) Iuliia Shishova
100 m	S5	(United Kingdom) Tully Kearney	(China) Zhang Li	(Italy) Monica Boggioni
100 m	S7	(Italy) Giulia Terzi	(United States) McKenzie Coan	(Ukraine) Yelyzaveta Mereshko (China) Jiang Yuyan
100 m	S9	(New Zealand) Sophie Pascoe	(Spain) Sarai Gascón Moreno	(Brazil) Mariana Ribeiro
100 m	S10	(Canada) Aurélie Rivard	(Netherlands) Chantalle Zijderveld	(Netherlands) Lisa Kruger
100 m	S11	(China) Li Guizhi	(Netherlands) Liesette Bruinsma	(China) Cai Liwen
100 m	S12	(Brazil) Carol Santiago	(International Paralympic Committee) Daria Pikalova	(United Kingdom) Hannah Russell
200 m
200 m	S5	(China) Zhang Li	(United Kingdom) Tully Kearney	(Italy) Monica Boggioni
200 m	S14	(International Paralympic Committee) Valeriia Shabalina	(United Kingdom) Bethany Firth	(United Kingdom) Jessica-Jane Applegate
400 m
400 m	S6	(China) Jiang Yuyan	(Ukraine) Yelyzaveta Mereshko	(Switzerland) Nora Meister
400 m	S7	(United States) McKenzie Coan	(Italy) Giulia Terzi	(United States) Julia Gaffney
400 m	S8	(United States) Morgan Stickney	(United States) Jessica Long	(Italy) Xenia Palazzo
400 m	S9	(Australia) Lakeisha Patterson	(Hungary) Zsofia Konkoly	(United Kingdom) Toni Shaw
400 m	S10	(Canada) Aurélie Rivard	(Hungary) Bianka Pap	(Poland) Oliwia Jabłońska
400 m	S11	(United States) Anastasia Pagonis	(Netherlands) Liesette Bruinsma	(China) Cai Liwen
400 m	S13	(Ukraine) Anna Stetsenko	(Italy) Carlotta Gilli	(Australia) Katja Dedekind

==== Backstroke ====
Event	Class	Gold	Silver	Bronze
50 m
50 m	S2	(Singapore) Yip Pin Xiu	(Japan) Miyuki Yamada	(China) Feng Yazhu
50 m	S3	(Italy) Arjola Trimi	(United Kingdom) Ellie Challis	(International Paralympic Committee) Iuliia Shishova
50 m	S4	(China) Liu Yu	(China) Zhou Yanfei	(Greece) Alexandra Stamatopoulou
50 m	S5	(China) Lu Dong	(Spain) Teresa Perales	(Turkey) Sevilay Öztürk
100 m
100 m	S2	(Singapore) Yip Pin Xiu	(Japan) Miyuki Yamada	(Mexico) Fabiola Ramirez
100 m	S6	(United States) Elizabeth Marks	(China) Jiang Yuyan	(Germany) Verena Schott
100 m	S7	(United States) Mallory Weggemann	(Canada) Danielle Dorris	(United States) Julia Gaffney
100 m	S8	(New Zealand) Tupou Neiufi	(Ukraine) Kateryna Denysenko	(United States) Jessica Long
100 m	S9	(United States) Hannah Aspden	(Spain) Núria Marquès	(New Zealand) Sophie Pascoe
100 m	S10	(Hungary) Bianka Papp	(Canada) Aurélie Rivard	(Netherlands) Lisa Kruger
100 m	S11	(China) Cai Liwen	(China) Wang Xinyi	(China) Li Guizhi
100 m	S12	(United Kingdom) Hannah Russell	(International Paralympic Committee) Daria Pikalova	(Brazil) Carol Santiago
100 m	S13	(United States) Gia Pergolini	(Italy) Carlotta Gilli	(Australia) Katja Dedekind
100 m	S14	(United Kingdom) Bethany Firth	(International Paralympic Committee) Valeriia Shabalina	(United Kingdom) Jessica-Jane Applegate

==== Breaststroke ====
Event	Class	Gold	Silver	Bronze
50 m
50 m	SB3	(Spain) Marta Fernandez Infante	(Russia) Nataliia Butkova	(Mexico) Nely Miranda
100 m
100 m	SB4	(Hungary) Fanni Illés	(Italy) Giulia Ghiretti	(China) Yao Cuan
100 m	SB5	(Ukraine) Yelyzaveta Mereshko	(United Kingdom) Grace Harvey	(Germany) Verena Schott
100 m	SB6	(United Kingdom) Maisie Summers-Newton	(China) Liu Daomin	(United States) Sophia Herzog
100 m	SB7	(International Paralympic Committee) Mariia Pavlova	(United States) Jessica Long	(Australia) Tiffany Thomas Kane
100 m	SB8	(Republic of Ireland) Ellen Keane	(New Zealand) Sophie Pascoe	(International Paralympic Committee) Adelina Razetdinova
100 m	SB9	(Netherlands) Chantalle Zijderveld	(Netherlands) Lisa Kruger	(Australia) Keira Stephens
100 m	SB11	(Cyprus) Karolina Pelendritou	(China) Ma Jia	(Ukraine) Yana Berezhna
100 m	SB12	(Brazil) Carol Santiago	(Russia) Daria Lukianenko	(Ukraine) Yaryna Matlo
100 m	SB13	(Germany) Elena Krawzow	(United Kingdom) Rebecca Redfern	(United States) Colleen Young
100 m	SB14	(Spain) Michelle Alonso	(United Kingdom) Louise Fiddes	(Brazil) Beatriz Carneiro

==== Butterfly ====
Event	Class	Gold	Silver	Bronze
50 m
50 m	S5	(China) Lu Dong	(Spain) Marta Fernandez Infante	(China) Cheng Jiao
50 m	S6	(China) Jiang Yuyan	(Republic of Ireland) Nicole Turner	(United States) Elizabeth Marks
50 m	S7	(Canada) Danielle Dorris	(United States) Mallory Weggemann	(Italy) Giulia Terzi
100 m
100 m	S8	(United States) Jessica Long	(Russia) Viktoriia Ishchiulova	(Colombia) Laura González
100 m	S9	(Hungary) Zsófia Konkoly	(United States) Elizabeth Smith	(Spain) Sarai Gascón Moreno
100 m	S10	(United States) Mikaela Jenkins	(Australia) Jasmine Greenwood	(Netherlands) Chantalle Zijderveld
100 m	S13	(Italy) Carlotta Gilli	(Italy) Alessia Berra	(International Paralympic Committee) Daria Pikalova
100 m	S14	(International Paralympic Committee) Valeriia Shabalina	(Australia) Paige Leonhardt	(Australia) Ruby Storm

==== Medley ====
Event	Class	Gold	Silver	Bronze
150 m
150 m	SM4	(China) Liu Yu	(China) Zhou Yanfei	(International Paralympic Committee) Nataliia Butkova
200 m
200 m	SM5	(China) Lu Dong	(China) Cheng Jiao	(Italy) Monica Boggioni
200 m	SM6	(United Kingdom) Maisie Summers-Newton	(Ukraine) Yelyzaveta Mereshko	(Germany) Verena Schott
200 m	SM7	(United States) Mallory Weggemann	(United States) Ahalya Lettenberger	(Australia) Tiffany Thomas-Kane
200 m	SM8	(United States) Jessica Long	(Italy) Xenia Palazzo	(International Paralympic Committee) Mariia Pavlova
200 m	SM9	(New Zealand) Sophie Pascoe	(Hungary) Zsófia Konkoly	(Spain) Núria Marquès
200 m	SM10	(Netherlands) Chantalle Zijderveld	(Hungary) Bianka Pap	(Netherlands) Lisa Kruger
200 m	SM11	(China) Ma Jia	(China) Cai Liwen	(United States) Anastasia Pagonis
200 m	SM13	(Italy) Carlotta Gilli	(United States) Colleen Young	(Uzbekistan) Shokhsanamkhon Toshpulatova
200 m	SM14	(International Olympic Committee) Valeriia Shabalina	(United Kingdom) Bethany Firth	(United Kingdom) Louise Fiddes

=== Relays ===
==== Freestyle ====
Event	Gold	Silver	Bronze
4x50 m 20 pts mixed	(China) China; Zhang Li; Zheng Tao; Yuan Weiyi; Lu Dong	(Italy) Italy; Giulia Terzi; Arjola Trimi; Luigi Beggiato; Antonio Fantin	(Brazil) Brazil; Patrícia Pereira; Daniel Dias; Joana da Silva Neves; Talisson Glock
4x100 m S14 mixed	(United Kingdom) Great Britain; Reece Dunn; Bethany Firth; Jessica-Jane Applegate; Jordan Catchpole	(Australia) Australia; Ricky Betar; Benjamin Hance; Ruby Storm; Madeleine McTernan	(Brazil) Brazil; Gabriel Bandeira; Ana Karolina Soares; Débora Carneiro; Felipe Vila Real
4x100 m 34 pts men	Australia WR; Rowan Crothers (S10); William Martin (S9); Matthew Levy (S7); Ben Popham (S8)	(Italy) Italy; Antonio Fantin (S6); Simone Ciulli (S9); Simone Barlaam (S9); Stefano Raimondi (10)	(Ukraine) Ukraine; Yurii Bozhynskyi (S9); Denys Dubrov (S8); Andrii Trusov (S7); Maksym Krypak (S10)
4x100 m 34 pts women	(Italy) Italy; Xenia Palazzo (S8); Vittoria Bianco (S9); Giulia Terzi (S7); Alessia Scortechini (S10)	(Australia) Australia; Ellie Cole (S9); Isabella Vincent (S7); Emily Beecroft (S9); Ashleigh McConnell (S9)	(Canada) Canada; Morgan Bird (S8); Katarina Roxon (S9); Sabrina Duchesne (S7); Aurélie Rivard (S10)
4x100 m 49 pts mixed	(International Paralympic Committee) RPC; Ilnur Garipov (S11); Anna Krivshina (S13); Daria Pikalova (S12); Vladimir Sotnikov (S13)	(Brazil) Brazil; Wendell Belarmino (S11); Douglas Matera (S13); Lucilene da Silva (S12); Carol Santiago (S12)	(Ukraine) Ukraine; Maryna Piddubna (S11); Maksym Veraksa (S12); Anna Stetsenko (S13); Kyrylo Garashchenko (S13)

==== Medley ====
Event	Gold	Silver	Bronze
4×100 m 34 pts men	(International Paralympic Committee) RPC; Bogdan Mozgovoi; Andrei Kalina; Alexander Skaliukh; Andrei Nikolaev	(Australia) Australia; Timothy Hodge; Timothy Disken; William Martin; Ben Popham	(Italy) Italy; Riccardo Menciotti; Stefano Raimondi; Simone Barlaam; Antonio Fantin
4×100 m 34 pts women	(United States) United States; Hannah Aspden; Mikaela Jenkins; Jessica Long; Morgan Stickney	(International Paralympic Committee) RPC; Anastasiia Gontar; Elizaveta Sidorenko; Viktoriia Ishchiulova; Ani Palian	(Australia) Australia; Ellie Cole; Keira Stephens; Emily Beecroft; Isabella Vincent

== Medal table ==
* Host nation (Japan)

Rank	Nation	Gold	Silver	Bronze	Total
1	China (CHN)	19	19	18	56
2	RPC (RPC)	17	14	18	49
3	United States (USA)	15	10	10	35
4	Ukraine (UKR)	14	18	11	43
5	Italy (ITA)	11	16	12	39
6	Australia (AUS)	8	10	15	33
7	Great Britain (GBR)	8	9	9	26
8	Brazil (BRA)	8	5	10	23
9	Israel (ISR)	6	1	1	8
10	Netherlands (NED)	5	6	6	17
11	Belarus (BLR)	5	1	0	6
12	Azerbaijan (AZE)	4	0	0	4
13	Japan (JPN)	3	7	3	13
14	Hungary (HUN)	3	4	0	7
15	Canada (CAN)	3	3	2	8
16	Mexico (MEX)	3	1	6	10
17	New Zealand (NZL)	3	1	1	5
18	Spain (ESP)	2	9	3	14
19	Colombia (COL)	2	4	4	10
20	Germany (GER)	2	0	3	5
21	Singapore (SGP)	2	0	0	2
22	Chile (CHI)	1	2	0	3
23	Ireland (IRL)	1	1	0	2
24	Cyprus (CYP)	1	0	1	2
25	France (FRA)	0	2	3	5
26	Argentina (ARG)	0	2	0	2
27	Czech Republic (CZE)	0	1	0	1
28	Greece (GRE)	0	0	3	3
29	Uzbekistan (UZB)	0	0	2	2
30	Croatia (CRO)	0	0	1	1
30	Kazakhstan (KAZ)	0	0	1	1
30	Lithuania (LTU)	0	0	1	1
30	Poland (POL)	0	0	1	1
30	Switzerland (SUI)	0	0	1	1
30	Turkey (TUR)	0	0	1	1
Totals (35 entries)		146	146	147	439

== Multiple medalists ==
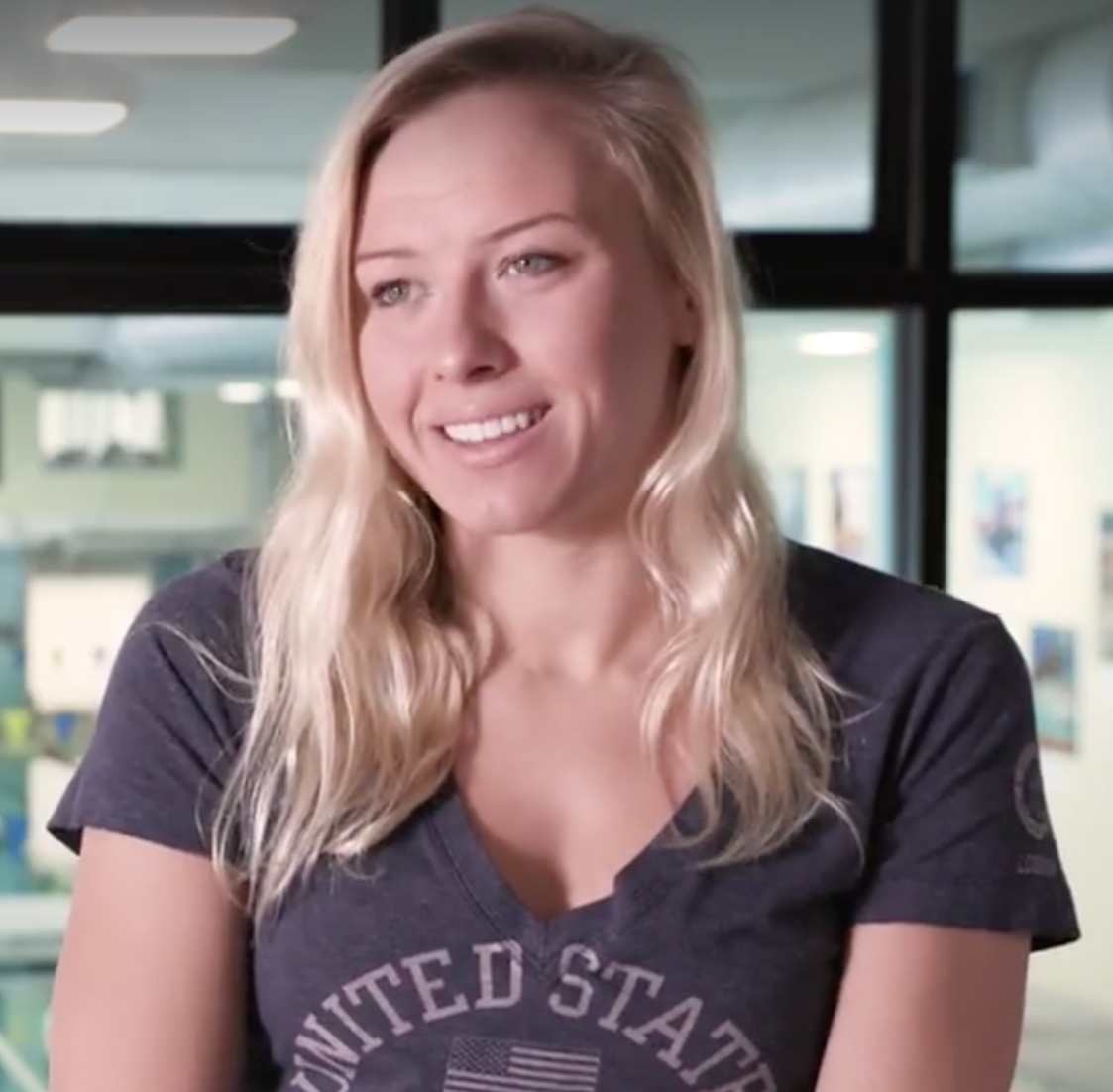
Jessica Long won six medals at this edition.

Men
Women

#	Swimmer	Country	Gold	Silver	Bronze
1	Maksym Krypak	Ukraine	5	1	1
2	Ihar Boki	Belarus	5	0	0
3	Lu Dong	China	4	0	0
3	Zheng Tao	China	4	0	0
5	Jessica Long	United States	3	2	1
6	Reece Dunn	United Kingdom	3	1	1
7	Chantalle Zijderveld	Netherlands	2	2	1
8	Bethany Firth	United Kingdom	2	2	0
9	Sophie Pascoe	New Zealand	2	1	1
10	Mark Malyar	Israel	2	0	1
11	Francesco Bocciardo	Italy	2	0	0
11	Robert Griswold	United States	2	0	0
11	Iyad Shalabi	Israel	2	0	0
14	Stefano Raimondi	Italy	1	4	2
15	Antonio Fantin	Italy	1	3	1
16	Jessica-Jane Applegate	United Kingdom	1	0	2
17	Hannah Russell	United Kingdom	1	0	1
17	Karolina Pelendritou	Cyprus	1	0	1

== See also ==
- Swimming at the 2020 Summer Olympics
