= Swimming at the 2020 Summer Paralympics – Men's 100 metre butterfly =

The Men's 100 metre butterfly swimming events for the 2020 Summer Paralympics took place at the Tokyo Aquatics Centre from August 25 to September 3, 2021. A total of seven events were contested over this distance.

== Schedule ==
H	Heats	½	Semifinals	F	Final

Date	Wed 25		Thu 26		Fri 27		Sat 28		Sun 29		Mon 30		Tue 31		Wed 1		Thu 2		Fri 3	
Event	M	E	M	E	M	E	M	E	M	E	M	E	M	E	M	E	M	E	M	E
S8 100m																			H	F
S9 100m																	H	F		
S10 100m													H	F						
S11 100m																			H	F
S12 100m																			H	F
S13 100m	H	F																		
S14 100m	H	F																		

== Medal summary ==
The following is a summary of the medals that were awarded across all 100 metre butterfly events.

Classification	Gold		Silver		Bronze	
S8	Robert Griswold; United States	1:02.03	Yang Feng; China	1:03.20	Denys Dubrov; Ukraine	1:03.23
S9	William Martin; Australia	57.19 WR	Simone Barlaam; Italy	59.43	Alexander Skaliukh; RPC	1:00.54
S10	Maksym Krypak; Ukraine	54.15 WR	Stefano Raimondi; Italy	55.04	Col Pearse; Australia	57.66
S11	Keiichi Kimura; Japan	1:02.57	Uchu Tomita; Japan	1:03.59	Wendell Belarmino Pereira; Brazil	1:05.20
S12	Raman Salei; Azerbaijan	57.81	Stephen Clegg; Great Britain	57.87	Roman Makarov; RPC	58.65
S13	Ihar Boki; Belarus	53.80 PR	Oleksii Virchenko; Ukraine	56.16	Islam Aslanov; Uzbekistan	57.12
S14	Gabriel Bandeira; Brazil	54.76 PR	Reece Dunn; Great Britain	55.12	Benjamin Hance; Australia	56.90

== Results ==
The following are the results of the finals only of each of the Men's 100 metre butterfly events in each of the classifications. Further details of each event, including where appropriate heats and semi finals results, are available on that event's dedicated page.

=== S8 ===
The S8 category is for swimmers who have a single amputation, or restrictive movement in their hip, knee and ankle joints.

The final in this classification took take place on 3 September 2021:

Rank	Lane	Name	Nationality	Time	Notes
1st place, gold medalist(s)	4	Robert Griswold	United States	1:02.03	AM
2nd place, silver medalist(s)	3	Yang Feng	China	1:03.20	
3rd place, bronze medalist(s)	6	Denys Dubrov	Ukraine	1:03.23	
4	5	Yang Guanglong	China	1:03.26	
5	2	Xu Haijiao	China	1:03.42	
6	1	Alberto Amodeo	Italy	1:04.31	
7	7	Luis Armando Andrade Guillen	Mexico	1:04.55	
8	8	Gabriel Cristiano Silva de Souza	Brazil	1:05.38	

=== S9 ===
The S9 category is for swimmers who have joint restrictions in one leg, or double below-the-knee amputations.

The final in this classification took place on 2 September 2021:

Rank	Lane	Name	Nationality	Time	Notes
1st place, gold medalist(s)	4	William Martin	Australia	57.19	WR
2nd place, silver medalist(s)	5	Simone Barlaam	Italy	59.43	
3rd place, bronze medalist(s)	2	Alexander Skaliukh	RPC	1:00.54	
4	6	Federico Morlacchi	Italy	1:00.75	
5	7	Timothy Hodge	Australia	1:01.03	
6	3	Jose Antonio Mari Alcaraz	Spain	1:01.28	
7	8	Yahor Shchalkanau	Belarus	1:01.38	
8	1	Malte Braunschweig	Germany	1:02.95	

=== S10 ===
The S10 category is for swimmers who have minor physical impairments, for example, loss of one hand.

The final in this classification took place on 31 August 2021:

Rank	Lane	Name	Nationality	Time	Notes
1st place, gold medalist(s)	4	Maksym Krypak	Ukraine	54.15	WR
2nd place, silver medalist(s)	5	Stefano Raimondi	Italy	55.04	
3rd place, bronze medalist(s)	3	Col Pearse	Australia	57.66	
4	8	Florent Marais	France	57.86	
5	2	Alec Elliot	Canada	58.44	
6	6	Dmitry Grigoryev	RPC	58.45	
7	7	Riccardo Menciotti	Italy	58.65	
8	1	David Levecq	Spain	59.12	

=== S11 ===
The S11 category is for swimmers who have severe visual impairments and have very low or no light perception, such as blindness, they are required to wear blackened goggles to compete. They use tappers when competing in swimming events.

The final in this classification took place on 3 September 2021:

Rank	Lane	Name	Nationality	Time	Notes
1st place, gold medalist(s)	4	Keiichi Kimura	Japan	1.02.57	
2nd place, silver medalist(s)	5	Uchu Tomita	Japan	1.03.59	
3rd place, bronze medalist(s)	6	Wendell Belarmino Pereira	Brazil	1.05.20	
4	2	Rogier Dorsman	Netherlands	1.05.67	
5	2	Matthew Cabraja	Canada	1.05.97	
6	7	Viktor Smyrnov	Ukraine	1.06.85	
7	8	Hua Dongdong	China	1.09.16	
8	1	Yang Bozun	China	1.09.23	

=== S12 ===
The S12 category is for swimmers who have moderate visual impairment and have a visual field of less than 5 degrees radius. They are required to wear blackened goggles to compete. They may wish to use a tapper.

The final in this classification took place on 3 September 2021:

Rank	Lane	Name	Nationality	Time	Notes
1st place, gold medalist(s)	4	Raman Salei	Azerbaijan	57.81	
2nd place, silver medalist(s)	2	Stephen Clegg	Great Britain	57.87	
3rd place, bronze medalist(s)	5	Roman Makarov	RPC	58.65	
4	6	Illia Yaremenko	Ukraine	58.98	
5	7	Danylo Chufarov	Ukraine	59.00	
6	3	Braedan Jason	Australia	59.01	
7	8	Maksim Vashkevich	Belarus	1.10.43	
8	1	Daniel Giraldo Correa	Colombia	1.02.42	

=== S13 ===
The S13 category is for swimmers who have minor visual impairment and have high visual acuity. They are required to wear blackened goggles to compete. They may wish to use a tapper.

The final in this classification took place on 25 August 2021:

Rank	Lane	Name	Nationality	Time	Notes
1st place, gold medalist(s)	4	Ihar Boki	Belarus	53.80	PR
2nd place, silver medalist(s)	5	Oleksii Virchenko	Ukraine	56.16	
3rd place, bronze medalist(s)	3	Islam Aslanov	Uzbekistan	57.12	
4	6	Alex Portal	France	57.13	
5	2	Muzaffar Tursunkhujaev	Uzbekistan	57.44	
6	1	Dzmitry Salei	Belarus	58.15	
7	7	Douglas Matera	Brazil	58.53	
8	8	Kyrylo Garashchenko	Ukraine	58.63	

=== S14 ===
The S14 category is for swimmers who have an intellectual impairment.

The final in this classification took place on 25 August 2021:

Rank	Lane	Name	Nationality	Time	Notes
1st place, gold medalist(s)	5	Gabriel Bandeira	Brazil	54.76	PR
2nd place, silver medalist(s)	4	Reece Dunn	Great Britain	55.12	
3rd place, bronze medalist(s)	6	Benjamin Hance	Australia	56.90	
4	2	Naohide Yamaguchi	Japan	57.11	
5	3	Lawrence Sapp	United States	57.36	
6	1	Robert Isak Jónsson	Iceland	58.06	
7	8	Cho Won-sang	South Korea	58.45	
8	7	Ricky Betar	Australia	58.62	
