= Swimming at the 2020 Summer Paralympics – Men's 50 metre freestyle =

The Men's 50 metre freestyle swimming events for the 2020 Summer Paralympics took place at the Tokyo Aquatics Centre from August 25 to September 2, 2021. A total of eight events were contested over this distance.

== Schedule ==
H	Heats	½	Semifinals	F	Final

Date	Wed 25		Thu 26		Fri 27		Sat 28		Sun 29		Mon 30		Tue 31		Wed 1		Thu 2	
Event	M	E	M	E	M	E	M	E	M	E	M	E	M	E	M	E	M	E
S3 50m																	H	F
S4 50m																	H	F
S5 50m															H	F		
S7 50m													H	F				
S9 50m									H	F								
S10 50m	H	F																
S11 50m					H	F												
S13 50m									H	F								

== Medal summary ==
The following is a summary of the medals awarded across all 50 metre freestyle events.

Classification	Gold		Silver		Bronze	
S3	Diego López Díaz; Mexico	44.66	Zou Liankang; China	45.25	Denys Ostapchenko; Ukraine	45.95
S4	Ami Omer Dadaon; Israel	37.21 PR	Takayuki Suzuki; Japan	37.70	Luigi Beggiato; Italy	38.12
S5	Zheng Tao; China	30.31 PR	Yuan Weiyi; China	31.11	Wang Lichao; China	31.35
S7	Andrii Trusov; Ukraine	27.43	Carlos Serrano Zárate; Colombia	27.84	Ievgenii Bogodaiko; Ukraine	27.99
S9	Simone Barlaam; Italy	24.71	Denis Tarasov; RPC	24.99	Jamal Hill; United States	25.19
S10	Rowan Crothers; Australia	23.21	Maksym Krypak; Ukraine	23.33	Phelipe Rodrigues; Brazil	23.50
S11	Wendell Belarmino; Brazil	26.03	Hua Dongdong; China	26.18	Edgaras Matakas; Lithuania	26.38
S13	Ihar Boki; Belarus	23.21 PR	Illia Yaremenko; Ukraine	23.70	Maksym Veraksa; Ukraine	23.83

== Results ==
The following were the results of the finals only of each of the Men's 50 metre freestyle events in each of the classifications. Further details of each event, including where appropriate heats and semi finals results, are available on that event's dedicated page.

=== S3 ===
The S3 category is for swimmers who have leg or arm amputations, have severe coordination problems in their limbs, or have to swim with their arms but don't use their trunk or legs.

The final in this classification took place on 2 September 2021:

Rank	Lane	Name	Nationality	Time	Notes
1st place, gold medalist(s)	3	Diego López Díaz	Mexico	44.66	
2nd place, silver medalist(s)	2	Zou Liankang	China	45.25	
3rd place, bronze medalist(s)	5	Denys Ostapchenko	Ukraine	45.95	
4	6	Jesús Hernández Hernández	Mexico	46.19	
5	4	Josia Topf	Germany	47.09	
6	7	Serhii Palamarchuk	Ukraine	47.61	
7	1	Vincenzo Boni	Italy	47.68	
8	8	Miguel Angel Martinez Tajuelo	Spain	54.99	

=== S4 ===
The S4 category is for swimmers who have function in their hands and arms but can't use their trunk or legs to swim, or they have three amputated limbs.

The final in this classification took place on 2 September 2021:

Rank	Lane	Name	Nationality	Time	Notes
1st place, gold medalist(s)	5	Ami Omer Dadaon	Israel	37.21	PR
2nd place, silver medalist(s)	4	Takayuki Suzuki	Japan	37.70	
3rd place, bronze medalist(s)	3	Luigi Beggiato	Italy	38.12	
4	6	Ángel de Jesús Camacho Ramírez	Mexico	39.37	
5	2	Liu Benying	China	39.98	
6	8	Eric Tobera	Brazil	41.46	
7	7	Ariel Malyar	Israel	41.70	
	1	Arnošt Petráček	Czech Republic	DSQ	

=== S5 ===
The S5 category is for swimmers who have hemiplegia, paraplegia or short stature.

The final in this classification took place on 1 September 2021:

Rank	Lane	Name	Nationality	Time	Notes
1st place, gold medalist(s)	5	Zheng Tao	China	30.31	PR, AS
2nd place, silver medalist(s)	4	Yuan Weiyi	China	31.11	
3rd place, bronze medalist(s)	6	Wang Lichao	China	31.35	
4	3	Daniel de Faria Dias	Brazil	32.12	
5	2	Muhammad Nur Syaiful Zulkafli	Malaysia	32.82	
6	1	Yaroslav Semenenko	Ukraine	33.11	
7	7	Francesco Bocciardo	Italy	33.22	
8	8	Sebastian Rodriguez	Spain	35.51	

=== S7 ===
The S7 category is for swimmers who have one leg and one arm amputation on opposite side or paralysis on one side of their body. These swimmers have full control of their arms and trunk but variable function in their legs.

The final in this classification took place on 31 August 2021:

Rank	Lane	Name	Nationality	Time	Notes
1st place, gold medalist(s)	4	Andrii Trusov	Ukraine	27.43	
2nd place, silver medalist(s)	7	Carlos Serrano Zárate	Colombia	27.84	=AM
3rd place, bronze medalist(s)	3	Yevhenii Bohodaiko	Ukraine	27.99	
4	5	Egor Efrosinin	RPC	28.31	
5	6	Matthew Levy	Australia	28.39	
6	2	Mark Malyar	Israel	28.49	
7	8	Wei Soong Toh	Singapore	28.65	
8	1	Federico Bicelli	Italy	28.77	

=== S9 ===
The S9 category is for swimmers who have joint restrictions in one leg or double below-the-knee amputations.

The final in this classification took place on 29 August 2021:

Rank	Lane	Name	Nationality	Time	Notes
1st place, gold medalist(s)	4	Simone Barlaam	Italy	24.71	PR
2nd place, silver medalist(s)	5	Denis Tarasov	RPC	24.99	
3rd place, bronze medalist(s)	6	Jamal Hill	United States	25.19	AM
4	3	William Martin	Australia	25.34	
5	2	Fredrik Solberg	Norway	25.53	
6	7	Bogdan Mozgovoi	RPC	25.56	
7	1	Timothy Disken	Australia	25.71	
8	8	Yahor Shchalkanau	Belarus	25.96	

=== S10 ===
The S10 category is for swimmers who have minor physical impairments, for example, loss of one hand.

The final in this classification took place on 25 August 2021:

Rank	Lane	Name	Nationality	Time	Notes
1st place, gold medalist(s)	4	Rowan Crothers	Australia	23.21	
2nd place, silver medalist(s)	5	Maksym Krypak	Ukraine	23.33	
3rd place, bronze medalist(s)	3	Phelipe Rodrigues	Brazil	23.50	
4	6	Stefano Raimondi	Italy	23.74	
5	2	Thomas Gallagher	Australia	24.16	
6	7	Dmitrii Bartasinskii	RPC	24.48	
7	1	Dmitry Drigoryev	RPC	24.61	
8	8	David Levecq	Spain	25.08	

=== S11 ===
The S11 category is for swimmers who have severe visual impairments and have very low or no light perception, such as blindness, they are required to wear blackened goggles to compete. They use tappers when competing in swimming events.

The final in this classification took place on 27 August 2021:

Rank	Lane	Name	Nationality	Time	Notes
1st place, gold medalist(s)	5	Wendell Belarmino Pereira	Brazil	26.03	
2nd place, silver medalist(s)	3	Hua Dongdong	China	26.18	
3rd place, bronze medalist(s)	4	Edgaras Matakas	Lithuania	26.38	
4	2	Yang Bozun	China	26.98	
5	7	Mykhailo Serbin	Ukraine	27.18	
6	6	Matheus Rheine Correa de Souza	Brazil	27.26	
7	1	Wojciech Makowski	Poland	27.83	
8	8	Marco Meneses	Portugal	28.02	

=== S13 ===
The S13 category is for swimmers who have minor visual impairment and have high visual acuity. They are required to wear blackened goggles to compete. They may wish to use a tapper.

The final in this classification took place on 29 August 2021:

Rank	Lane	Name	Nationality	Time	Notes
1st place, gold medalist(s)	4	Ihar Boki	Belarus	23.21	PR
2nd place, silver medalist(s)	3	Illia Yaremenko	Ukraine	23.70	
3rd place, bronze medalist(s)	6	Maksym Veraksa	Ukraine	23.83	
4	2	Raman Salei	Azerbaijan	23.85	
5	5	Islam Aslanov	Uzbekistan	23.85	
6	1	Dzmitry Salei	Belarus	24.23	
7	7	Oleksii Virchenko	Ukraine	24.29	
8	8	Nicolas Guy Turbide	Canada	24.59	
