= Swimming at the 2024 Summer Paralympics – Men's 50 metre freestyle S13 =

Men's 50 metre freestyle S13 at the XVII Paralympic Games
- Venue: Paris La Défense Arena
- Dates: 2 September 2024
- Competitors: 12 from 7 nations
- Winning time: 23.65

Medalists
1st place, gold medalist(s)		Ihar Boki	Neutral Paralympic Athletes
2nd place, silver medalist(s)		Illia Yaremenko	Ukraine
3rd place, bronze medalist(s)		Oleksii Virchenko	Ukraine

The men's 50 metre freestyle S13 event at the 2024 Paralympic Games took place on 2 September 2024, at the Paris La Défense Arena.

== Heats ==
The swimmers with the top eight times, regardless of heat, advanced to the final.

Rank	Heat	Lane	Name	Nationality	Time	Notes
1	2	5	Ihar Boki	Neutral Paralympic Athletes	23.60	Q
2	1	5	Maksym Veraksa	Ukraine	23.80	Q
3	2	4	Oleksii Virchenko	Ukraine	24.00	Q
4	1	3	Illia Yaremenko	Ukraine	24.17	Q
5	2	3	Nicolas-Guy Turbide	Canada	24.33	Q
6	1	4	Islam Aslanov	Uzbekistan	24.35	Q
7	1	2	Dzmitry Salei	Neutral Paralympic Athletes	24.38	Q
7	2	6	Muzaffar Tursunkhujaev	Uzbekistan	24.38	Q
9	2	2	Raman Salei	Azerbaijan	24.39	
10	1	6	Taliso Engel	Germany	24.72	
11	2	7	Enrique José Alhambra Mollar	Spain	24.80	
12	1	7	Kirill Pankov	Uzbekistan	25.86	

== Final ==
Rank	Lane	Name	Nationality	Time	Notes
1st place, gold medalist(s)	4	Ihar Boki	Neutral Paralympic Athletes	23.65	
2nd place, silver medalist(s)	6	Illia Yaremenko	Ukraine	23.77	
3rd place, bronze medalist(s)	3	Oleksii Virchenko	Ukraine	23.85	
4	5	Maksym Veraksa	Ukraine	24.00	
5	7	Islam Aslanov	Uzbekistan	24.18	
6	8	Muzaffar Tursunkhujaev	Uzbekistan	24.32	
7	2	Nicolas-Guy Turbide	Canada	24.40	
8	1	Dzmitry Salei	Neutral Paralympic Athletes	24.48	
