= 2019 World Para Swimming Championships – Men's 50 metre freestyle =

The men's 50m freestyle events at the 2019 World Para Swimming Championships were held in the London Aquatics Centre at the Queen Elizabeth Olympic Park in London between 9–15 September.

== Medalists ==
Event	Gold	Silver	Bronze
S3	Diego Lopez Diaz; Mexico	Zou Liankang; China	Denys Ostapchenko; Ukraine
S4	Cameron Leslie; New Zealand	Takayuki Suzuki; Japan	Roman Zhdanov; Russia
S5	Daniel Dias; Brazil	Francesco Bocciardo; Italy	Muhammad Nur Syaiful Zulkafli; Malaysia
S6	Nelson Crispín; Colombia	Antonio Fantin; Italy	Laurent Chardard; France
S7	Andrii Trusov; Ukraine	Sergei Sukharev; Russia	Yevhenii Bohodaiko; Ukraine
S8	Dimosthenis Michalentzakis; Greece	Yang Guanglong; China	Ben Popham; Australia
S9	Simone Barlaam; Italy	Denis Tarasov; Russia	Simone Ciulli; Italy
S10	Stefano Raimondi; Italy	Phelipe Melo Rodrigues; Brazil	Rowan Crothers; Australia
S11	Wendell Belarmino Pereira; Brazil	Kirill Belousov; Russia	Hua Dongdong; China
S12	Illia Yaremenko; Ukraine	Yaroslav Denysenko; Ukraine	Raman Salei; Azerbaijan
S12	Illia Yaremenko; Ukraine	Yaroslav Denysenko; Ukraine	Dzmitry Salei; Belarus
S13	Ihar Boki; Belarus	Islam Aslanov; Uzbekistan	Muzaffar Tursunkhujaev; Uzbekistan

== Results ==
=== S3 ===
Heats

17 swimmers from 14 nations took part.

Rank	Heat	Athlete	Nation	Result	Notes
1	2	Diego Lopez Diaz	Mexico	45.02	Q
2	1	Denys Ostapchenko	Ukraine	46.63	Q
3	2	Vincenzo Boni	Italy	46.87	Q
4	2	Zou Liankang	China	48.20	Q
5	1	Serhii Palamarchuk	Ukraine	49.72	Q
6	2	Josia Topf	Germany	52.67	Q
7	1	Marcos Rafael Zarate Rodriguez	Mexico	53.29	Q
8	1	Miguel Angel Martinez Tajuelo	Spain	53.33	Q
9	2	Grant Patterson	Australia	54.26	
10	1	Ioannis Kostakis	Greece	56.87	
11	1	Aleksandr Beliaev	Russia	56.89	
12	1	Youssef Elsayed	Egypt	1:01.66	
13	1	Bruno Becker da Silva	Brazil	1:03.16	
14	2	Kamil Otowski	Poland	1:04.77	
15	2	Ievgen Panibratets	Ukraine	1:08.43	
16	2	Shakhan Zhuldasbayev	Kazakhstan	1:15.41	
17	2	Charkorn Kaewsri	Thailand	1:26.36	

Final

Rank	Athlete	Nation	Result	Notes
1st place, gold medalist(s)	Diego Lopez Diaz	Mexico	43.51	
2nd place, silver medalist(s)	Zou Liankang	China	45.40	
3rd place, bronze medalist(s)	Denys Ostapchenko	Ukraine	46.09	
4	Serhii Palamarchuk	Ukraine	47.74	
5	Vincenzo Boni	Italy	47.97	
6	Marcos Rafael Zarate Rodriguez	Mexico	53.50	
7	Miguel Angel Martinez Tajuelo	Spain	53.92	
8	Josia Topf	Germany	56.73	

=== S4 ===
Heats

14 swimmers from 13 nations took part.

Rank	Heat	Athlete	Nation	Result	Notes
1	2	Takayuki Suzuki	Japan	37.98	Q
2	1	Cameron Leslie	New Zealand	38.96	Q
3	2	Roman Zhdanov	Russia	40.03	Q
4	2	Arnost Petracek	Czech Republic	41.67	Q
5	1	David Smétanine	France	41.98	Q
6	2	Matz Topkin	Estonia	42.29	Q
7	2	Gustavo Sanchez Martinez	Mexico	42.42	Q
8	1	Darko Duric	Slovenia	42.51	Q
9	2	Ariel Malyar	Israel	42.78	
10	1	Andreas Ernhofer	Austria	43.08	
11	1	Andrii Derevinskyi	Ukraine	43.84	
12	1	Jesús Hernández Hernández	Mexico	45.56	
13	2	Tomi Brajsa	Croatia	46.68	
14	1	Ivan Fernandez	Spain	50.90	

Final

Rank	Athlete	Nation	Result	Notes
1st place, gold medalist(s)	Cameron Leslie	New Zealand	37.14	WR
2nd place, silver medalist(s)	Takayuki Suzuki	Japan	37.56	
3rd place, bronze medalist(s)	Roman Zhdanov	Russia	39.14	
4	Arnost Petracek	Czech Republic	41.01	
5	David Smétanine	France	41.41	
6	Gustavo Sanchez Martinez	Mexico	42.07	
7	Darko Duric	Slovenia	42.40	
8	Matz Topkin	Estonia	42.57	

=== S5 ===
Heats

16 swimmers from 12 nations took part.

Rank	Heat	Athlete	Nation	Result	Notes
1	2	Daniel Dias	Brazil	32.54	Q
2	1	Muhammad Nur Syaiful Zulkafli	Malaysia	33.20	Q, AS
3	1	Yaroslav Semenenko	Ukraine	33.35	Q
4	2	Francesco Bocciardo	Italy	33.67	Q
5	2	Artur Kubasov	Russia	35.45	Q
6	2	Theo Curin	France	35.63	Q
7	1	Sebastian Rodriguez	Spain	35.71	Q
8	1	Siyazbek Daliyev	Kazakhstan	35.85	Q
9	1	Phuchit Aingchaiyaphum	Thailand	37.17	
10	2	Jamery Siga	Malaysia	38.28	
11	2	Abbas Karimi	Refugee Para Team	38.32	
12	2	Li Junsheng	China	38.62	
13	1	Oleksii Kabyshev	Ukraine	38.73	
14	1	Beytullah Eroglu	Turkey	38.77	
15	2	Luis Huerta Poza	Spain	39.48	
16	1	Bulent Oturakci	Turkey	41.83	

Final

Rank	Athlete	Nation	Result	Notes
1st place, gold medalist(s)	Daniel Dias	Brazil	31.83	CR
2nd place, silver medalist(s)	Francesco Bocciardo	Italy	32.89	
3rd place, bronze medalist(s)	Muhammad Nur Syaiful Zulkafli	Malaysia	33.20	=AS
4	Yaroslav Semenenko	Ukraine	33.23	
5	Theo Curin	France	34.97	
6	Siyazbek Daliyev	Kazakhstan	35.37	
7	Artur Kubasov	Russia	35.78	
8	Sebastian Rodriguez	Spain	36.10	

=== S6 ===
Heats

19 swimmers from 16 nations took part.

Rank	Heat	Athlete	Nation	Result	Notes
1	2	Nelson Crispín	Colombia	29.95	Q
2	1	Wang Jingang	China	29.96	Q
3	1	Antonio Fantin	Italy	30.47	Q
4	2	Laurent Chardard	France	30.57	Q
5	2	Thijs van Hofweegen	Netherlands	31.05	Q
6	1	Oleksandr Komarov	Ukraine	31.36	Q
7	1	Georgios Sfaltos	Greece	31.96	Q
8	2	Yerzhan Salimgereyev	Kazakhstan	32.06	Q
9	1	Leo McCrea	Switzerland	32.37	
10	2	Talisson Glock	Brazil	32.46	
11	1	Panagiotis Christakis	Greece	32.67	
12	1	Hamish McLean	New Zealand	32.87	
13	1	Rual Gutierrez Bermudez	Mexico	32.90	
14	2	Daniel Videira	Portugal	33.50	
15	1	Juan Jose Gutierrez Bermudez	Mexico	33.64	
16	1	Raul Alberto Martinez Valdes	Mexico	33.71	
17	2	Dino Sinovcic	Croatia	33.91	
18	2	Aung Myint Myat Myat	Myanmar	34.79	
19	2	Mateus Angula	Namibia	51.59	

Final

Rank	Athlete	Nation	Result	Notes
1st place, gold medalist(s)	Nelson Crispín	Colombia	29.19	CR
2nd place, silver medalist(s)	Antonio Fantin	Italy	29.92	ER
3rd place, bronze medalist(s)	Laurent Chardard	France	30.74	
4	Thijs van Hofweegen	Netherlands	31.21	
5	Oleksandr Komarov	Ukraine	31.37	
6	Yerzhan Salimgereyev	Kazakhstan	31.73	
7	Georgios Sfaltos	Greece	32.00	
—	Wang Jingang	China	DSQ	

=== S8 ===
Heats

14 swimmers from 12 nations took part.

Rank	Heat	Athlete	Nation	Result	Notes
1	2	Dimosthenis Michalentzakis	Greece	26.59	Q
2	2	Gabriel Cristiano Silva da Sousa	Brazil	27.06	Q
3	1	Yang Guanglon	China	27.47	Q
4	1	Ben Popham	Australia	27.73	Q
5	2	Andrei Nikolaev	Russia	27.98	Q
6	1	Michal Golus	Poland	28.02	Q
7	2	Joshua Grob	Switzerland	28.21	Q
8	1	Niels Mortensen	Denmark	28.32	Q
9	2	Blake Cochrane	Australia	28.51	
10	1	Sergio Salvador Martos Minguet	Spain	28.60	
11	1	Maxim Borodaev	Russia	28.66	
12	2	Jurijs Semjonovs	Latvia	28.87	
13	1	Zaki Zulkarnain	Indonesia	29.01	
—	2	Luis Armando Andrade Guillen	Mexico	DSQ	

Final

Rank	Athlete	Nation	Result	Notes
1st place, gold medalist(s)	Dimosthenis Michalentzakis	Greece	26.54	
2nd place, silver medalist(s)	Yang Guanglong	China	26.81	
3rd place, bronze medalist(s)	Ben Popham	Australia	26.94	
4	Gabriel Cristianos Silva de Sousa	Brazil	27.31	
5	Andrei Nikolaev	Russia	27.66	
6	Michal Golus	Poland	28.06	
7	Joshua Grob	Switzerland	28.10	
8	Niels Mortensen	Denmark	28.21	

=== S10 ===
Heats

13 swimmers from 9 nations took part.

Rank	Heat	Athlete	Nation	Result	Notes
1	2	Rowan Crothers	Australia	23.70	Q, OC
2	2	Phelipe Andrews Melo Rodrigues	Brazil	23.77	Q
3	1	Maksym Krypak	Ukraine	23.94	Q
4	1	Stefano Raimondi	Italy	24.04	Q
5	1	Dmitry Grigoryev	Russia	25.10	Q
6	2	Dmitrii Bartasinskii	Russia	25.12	Q
7	1	David Levecq	Spain	25.25	Q
8	2	Alexander Elliot	Canada	25.41	Q
9	1	William Martin	Australia	25.80	
10	1	Shahin Izadyar	Iran	26.38	
11	2	Dmytro Vanzenko	Ukraine	26.41	
12	2	Sina Zeyghaminejad	Iran	26.68	
13	2	Ludvig Nyren	Sweden	26.94	

Final

Rank	Athlete	Nation	Result	Notes
1st place, gold medalist(s)	Stefano Raimondi	Italy	23.63	
2nd place, silver medalist(s)	Phelipe Andrews Melo Rodrigues	Brazil	23.71	
3rd place, bronze medalist(s)	Rowan Crothers	Australia	23.72	
4	Maksym Krypak	Ukraine	23.74	
5	Dmitry Grigoryev	Russia	24.62	
6	Dmitrii Bartasinskii	Russia	24.93	
7	David Levecq	Russia	24.99	
8	Alexander Elliot	Canada	25.08	

=== S11 ===
Heats

21 swimmers from 12 nations took part.

Rank	Heat	Athlete	Nation	Result	Notes
1	2	Hua Dongdong	China	26.13	Q
2	1	Enhamed Enhamed	Spain	26.36	Q
2	3	Kirill Belousov	Russia	26.36	Q
4	1	Keiichi Kimura	Japan	26.77	Q
5	2	Wendell Belarmino Pereira	Brazil	26.78	Q
6	3	Yang Bozun	China	27.06	Q
7	3	Wojciech Makowski	Poland	27.35	Q
8	1	Edgaras Matakas	Lithuania	27.52	Q
9	3	Hendri Herbst	South Africa	27.58	
10	2	Uchu Tomita	Japan	27.80	
11	1	Matthew Cabraja	Canada	27.95	
12	3	Jose Ramon Cantero Elvira	Spain	28.22	
13	1	Viktor Smyrnov	Ukraine	28.23	
14	2	Matheus Rheine Correa Souza	Brazil	28.25	
15	3	Maksim Koval	Russia	28.27	
16	2	Hryhory Zudzilau	Belarus	28.51	
17	2	Már Gunnarsson	Iceland	28.74	
18	2	Leider Albeiro Lemus Rojas	Colombia	28.85	
19	3	Mykhailo Serbin	Ukraine	29.21	
20	1	Miroslav Smrcka	Czech Republic	29.56	
21	1	Mansurbek Ibrashev	Kazakhstan	29.76	

Final

Rank	Athlete	Nation	Result	Notes
1st place, gold medalist(s)	Wendell Belarmino Pereira	Brazil	26.20	
2nd place, silver medalist(s)	Kirill Belousov	Russia	26.25	
3rd place, bronze medalist(s)	Hua Dongdong	China	26.47	
4	Keiichi Kimura	Japan	26.57	
5	Enhamed Enhamed	Spain	26.63	
6	Yang Bozun	China	26.76	
7	Edgaras Matakas	Lithuania	27.28	
8	Wojciech Makowski	Poland	27.46	

=== S12 ===
Heats

13 swimmers from 8 nations took part.

Rank	Heat	Athlete	Nation	Result	Notes
1	2	Illia Yaremenko	Ukraine	23.92	Q
2	2	Dzmitry Salei	Belarus	24.47	Q
3	1	Raman Salei	Azerbaijan	24.50	Q
4	2	Yaroslav Denysenko	Ukraine	24.72	Q
5	1	Braedan Jason	Australia	24.87	Q, OC
6	2	Stephen Clegg	Great Britain	25.09	Q
7	2	Uladzimir Izotau	Belarus	25.22	Q
8	1	Franco Smit	South Africa	25.51	Q, AF
9	2	Dmitriy Horlin	Uzbekistan	25.63	
10	2	Maksim Vashkevich	Belarus	25.77	
11	1	Uladzimir Sotnikau	Belarus	25.78	
12	1	Mohammadhossein Karimi Jahan Abadi	Iran	26.68	
—	1	Maksym Veraksa	Ukraine	DSQ	

Final

Rank	Athlete	Nation	Result	Notes
1st place, gold medalist(s)	Illia Yaremenko	Ukraine	23.53	
2nd place, silver medalist(s)	Yaroslav Denysenko	Ukraine	23.91	
3rd place, bronze medalist(s)	Raman Salei	Azerbaijan	24.32	
3rd place, bronze medalist(s)	Dzmitry Salei	Belarus	24.32	
5	Stephen Clegg	Great Britain	24.78	
6	Braedan Jason	Australia	24.96	
7	Franco Smit	South Africa	25.30	AF
8	Uladzimir Izotau	Belarus	25.34	

=== S13 ===
Heats

13 swimmers from 9 nations took part.

Rank	Heat	Name	Nationality	Time	Notes
1	1	Ihar Boki	Belarus	23.50	Q
2	2	Islam Aslanov	Uzbekistan	23.86	Q
3	2	Muzaffar Tursunkhujaev	Uzbekistan	24.21	Q
4	1	Oleksii Virchenko	Ukraine	24.59	Q
5	1	Kyrylo Garashchenko	Ukraine	24.71	Q
6	2	Carlos Farrenberg	Brazil	24.78	Q
7	2	Nicolas Guy Turbide	Canada	25.52	Q
8	1	Kamil Rzetelski	Poland	25.88	Q
9	1	Guilherme Batista Silva	Brazil	25.99	
10	1	Borja Sanz Tamayo	Spain	26.01	
11	2	Ivan Salguero Oteiza	Spain	26.06	
12	2	Taliso Engel	Germany	26.12	
13	2	Roman Agalakov	Kazakhstan	26.25	

Final

Rank	Name	Nationality	Time	Notes
1st place, gold medalist(s)	Ihar Boki	Belarus	23.30	
2nd place, silver medalist(s)	Islam Aslanov	Uzbekistan	23.77	
3rd place, bronze medalist(s)	Muzaffar Tursunkhujaev	Uzbekistan	24.01	
4	Kyrylo Garashchenko	Ukraine	24.53	
5	Carlos Farrenberg	Brazil	24.57	
5	Oleksii Virchenko	Ukraine	24.57	
7	Nicolas Guy Turbide	Canada	24.97	
8	Kamil Rzetelski	Poland	25.64	
