= Swimming at the 2020 Summer Paralympics – Men's 100 metre butterfly S13 =

Men's 100 metre freestyle S13 at the XVI Paralympic Games
- Venue: Tokyo Aquatics Centre
- Dates: 25 August 2021
- Competitors: 13 from 9 nations
- Winning time: 53.80

Medalists
1st place, gold medalist(s)		Ihar Boki	Belarus
2nd place, silver medalist(s)		Oleksii Virchenko	Ukraine
3rd place, bronze medalist(s)		Islam Aslanov	Uzbekistan

The Men's 100 metre butterfly S13 event at the 2020 Paralympic Games took place on 25 August 2021, at the Tokyo Aquatics Centre.

== Heats ==
The swimmers with the top 8 times, regardless of heat, advanced to the final.

Rank	Heat	Lane	Name	Nationality	Time	Notes
1	2	4	Ihar Boki	Belarus	55.12	Q
2	2	5	Oleksii Virchenko	Ukraine	56.30	Q
3	1	4	Islam Aslanov	Uzbekistan	57.29	Q
4	1	5	Alex Portal	France	57.60	Q
5	1	3	Muzaffar Tursunkhujaev	Uzbekistan	57.73	Q
6	1	6	Douglas Matera	Brazil	58.66	Q
7	2	3	Dzmitry Salei	Belarus	58.80	Q
8	2	6	Kyrylo Garashichenko	Ukraine	59.92	Q
9	1	2	David Henry Abrahams	United States	1:00.69	
10	1	7	Genki Saito	Japan	1:01.14	
11	2	2	Roman Agalakov	Kazakhstan	1:02.21	
12	2	1	Gerasimos Lignos	Greece	1:03.01	
13	2	7	Uladzimir Sotnikau	Belarus	1:03.68	

== Final ==
100m butterfly final
Rank	Lane	Name	Nationality	Time	Notes
1st place, gold medalist(s)	4	Ihar Boki	Belarus	53.80	PR
2nd place, silver medalist(s)	5	Oleksii Virchenko	Ukraine	56.16	
3rd place, bronze medalist(s)	3	Islam Aslanov	Uzbekistan	57.12	
4	6	Alex Portal	France	57.13	
5	2	Muzaffar Tursunkhujaev	Uzbekistan	57.44	
6	1	Dzmitry Salei	Belarus	58.15	
7	7	Douglas Matera	Brazil	58.53	
8	8	Kyrylo Garashichenko	Ukraine	58.63	

== See also ==
- Swimming at the 2016 Summer Paralympics – Men's 100 metre butterfly S13
