= Yang Feng (swimmer) =

Chinese paralympic swimmer

Sport
- Country: China
- Sport: Swimming
Medal record
Representing China
Paralympic Games
Swimming
Silver medal – second place	2020 Tokyo	Men's 100 metres butterfly S8

Yang Feng is a Chinese paralympic swimmer. He participated at the 2020 Summer Paralympics in the swimming competition, being awarded the silver medal in the men's 100 metres butterfly event on S8 class, scoring 1:03.20. Feng also participated at the 2012 Summer Paralympics in the swimming competition, winning no medal.
