= Swimming at the 2020 Summer Paralympics – Men's 100 metre butterfly S8 =

Men's 100 metre butterfly S8 at the XVI Paralympic Games
- Venue: Tokyo Aquatics Centre
- Dates: 3 September 2021
- Competitors: 16 from 10 nations
- Winning time: 1:02.031

Medalists
| 1st place, gold medalist(s) | | Robert Griswold | United States |
| 2nd place, silver medalist(s) | | Feng Yang | China |
| 3rd place, bronze medalist(s) | | Denys Dubrov | Ukraine |

The Men's 100 metre butterfly S8 event at the 2020 Paralympic Games took place on 3 September 2021, at the Tokyo Aquatics Centre.

== Results ==
=== Heats ===
The swimmers with the top 8 times, regardless of heat, advanced to the final.

==== Heat 1 ====
| Rank | Lane | Name | Nationality | Time | Notes |
|---|---|---|---|---|---|
| 1 | 4 | Robert Griswold | United States | 1:02.521 | Q |
| 2 | 3 | Denys Dubrov | Ukraine | 1:04.272 | Q |
| 3 | 1 | Haijiao Xu | China | 1:04.843 | Q |
| 4 | 7 | Diogo Cancela | Portugal | 1:05.695 | Q |
| 5 | 2 | Jesse Aungles | Australia | 1:05.776 | Q |
| 6 | 6 | Michal Golus | Poland | 1:06.177 | Q |
| 7 | 8 | Carlos Fernández | Spain | 1:11.868 | |

==== Heat 2 ====
| Rank | Lane | Name | Nationality | Time | Notes |
|---|---|---|---|---|---|
| 1 | 7 | Guanglong Yang | China | 1:03.951 | Q |
| 2 | 3 | Feng Yang | China | 1:04.242 | Q |
| 3 | 5 | Alberto Amodeo | Italy | 1:05.323 | Q |
| 4 | 6 | Gabriel Cristiano Silva de Souza | Brazil | 1:05.554 | Q |
| 5 | 4 | Dimosthenis Michalentzakis | Greece | 1:05.695 | Q |
| 6 | 2 | Kotaro Ogiwara | Japan | 1:05.986 | Q |
| 7 | 1 | Sergio Salvador Martos Minguet | Spain | 1:08.017 | Q |
| 8 | 8 | Andreas Onea | Austria | 1:09.528 | |

=== Final ===
| Rank | Lane | Name | Nationality | Time | Notes |
|---|---|---|---|---|---|
| 1st place, gold medalist(s) | 4 | Robert Griswold | United States | 1:02.031 | |
| 2nd place, silver medalist(s) | 3 | Feng Yang | China | 1:03.202 | |
| 3rd place, bronze medalist(s) | 6 | Denys Dubrov | Ukraine | 1:03.233 | |
| 4 | 5 | Guanglong Yang | China | 1:03.264 | |
| 5 | 2 | Haijiao Xu | China | 1:03.425 | |
| 6 | 1 | Alberto Amodeo | Italy | 1:04.316 | |
| 7 | 7 | Luis Armando Andrade Guillen | Mexico | 1:04.557 | |
| 8 | 8 | Gabriel Cristiano Silva de Souza | Brazil | 1:05.388 | |
