= 2022 World Para Swimming Championships – Men's 100 metre butterfly =

The men's 100m butterfly events at the 2022 World Para Swimming Championships were held at the Penteada Olympic Swimming Complex in Madeira between 12–18 June.

== Medalists ==
Event	Gold	Silver	Bronze
S8	Robert Griswold; United States	Alberto Amodeo; Italy	Gabriel Cristiano Silva de Souza; Brazil
S9	Simone Barlaam; Italy	William Martin; Australia	Federico Morlacchi; Italy
S10	Stefano Raimondi; Italy	Col Pearse; Australia	Alex Saffy; Australia
S11	Keiichi Kimura; Japan	Rogier Dorsman; Netherlands	Uchu Tomita; Japan
S12	Stephen Clegg; Great Britain	Raman Salei; Azerbaijan	Illia Yaremenko; Ukraine
S13	Oleksii Virchenko; Ukraine	Alex Portal; France	Islam Aslanov; Uzbekistan

== Results ==
=== S13 ===
Heats

11 swimmers from eight nations took part. The swimmers with the top eight times, regardless of heat, advanced to the final.

Rank	Heat	Lane	Name	Nation	Result	Notes
1	2	4	Oleksii Virchenko	Ukraine	56.90	Q
2	1	4	Alex Portal	France	57.14	Q
3	2	5	Islam Aslanov	Uzbekistan	57.72	Q
4	1	5	Muzaffar Tursunkhujaev	Uzbekistan	57.88	Q
5	2	6	Enrique José Alhambra Mollar	Spain	59.24	Q
6	2	3	Douglas Matera	Brazil	59.58	Q
7	1	3	Kirill Pankov	Uzbekistan	1:00.22	Q
8	2	2	Genki Saito	Japan	1:01.30	Q
9	1	6	Juan Ferron Gutierrez	Spain	1:01.40	
10	2	7	Zhi Wei Wong	Singapore	1:04.01	
11	1	2	Kamil Rzetelski	Poland	1:05.49	

Final

The final was held on 12 June 2022.

Rank	Athlete	Nation	Result	Notes
1st place, gold medalist(s)	Oleksii Virchenko	Ukraine	56.12	
2nd place, silver medalist(s)	Alex Portal	France	56.34	
3rd place, bronze medalist(s)	Islam Aslanov	Uzbekistan	56.94	
4	Enrique José Alhambra Mollar	Spain	57.72	
5	Muzaffar Tursunkhujaev	Uzbekistan	57.79	
6	Douglas Matera	Brazil	58.34	
7	Kirill Pankov	Uzbekistan	1:00.50	
8	Genki Saito	Japan	1:01.06	
