= Swimming at the 2020 Summer Paralympics – Women's 100 metre breaststroke SB13 =

Women's 100 metre breaststroke SB13 at the XVI Paralympic Games
- Venue: Tokyo Aquatics Centre
- Dates: 1 September 2021
- Competitors: 15 from 12 nations

Medalists
| 1st place, gold medalist(s) | | Elena Krawzow | Germany |
| 2nd place, silver medalist(s) | | Rebecca Redfern | Great Britain |
| 3rd place, bronze medalist(s) | | Colleen Young | United States |

The Women's 100 metre breaststroke SB13 event at the 2020 Paralympic Games took place on 1 September 2021, at the Tokyo Aquatics Centre.

== Heats ==
The swimmers with the top eight times, regardless of heat, advanced to the final.

| Rank | Heat | Lane | Name | Nationality | Time | Notes |
|---|---|---|---|---|---|---|
| 1 | 2 | 4 | Elena Krawzow | Germany | 1:15.31 | Q |
| 2 | 1 | 4 | Rebecca Redfern | Great Britain | 1:15.46 | Q |
| 3 | 2 | 5 | Colleen Young | United States | 1:16.40 | Q |
| 4 | 2 | 3 | Anastasiya Zudzilava | Belarus | 1:20.09 | Q |
| 5 | 1 | 7 | Róisín Ní Riain | Ireland | 1:20.81 | Q |
| 6 | 1 | 5 | Mariia Latritskaia | RPC | 1:21.11 | Q |
| 7 | 1 | 3 | Shokhsanamkhon Toshpulatova | Uzbekistan | 1:21.60 | Q |
| 8 | 1 | 6 | Marlene Endrolath | Germany | 1:21.81 | Q |
| 9 | 1 | 2 | Carlotta Gilli | Italy | 1:22.73 | |
| 10 | 2 | 6 | Ayano Tsujiuchi | Japan | 1:23.49 | |
| 11 | 2 | 8 | Dana Shandibina | Azerbaijan | 1:24.51 | |
| 12 | 2 | 1 | Alani Ferreira | South Africa | 1:25.01 | |
| 13 | 1 | 1 | Ariadna Edo Beltrán | Spain | 1:27.89 | |
| 14 | 2 | 7 | Nigorakhon Mirzokhidova | Uzbekistan | 1:28.12 | |
| 15 | 2 | 2 | Martha Ruether | United States | 1:28.89 | |

== Final ==
| Rank | Lane | Name | Nationality | Time | Notes |
|---|---|---|---|---|---|
| 1st place, gold medalist(s) | 4 | Elena Krawzow | Germany | 1:13.46 | ER |
| 2nd place, silver medalist(s) | 5 | Rebecca Redfern | Great Britain | 1:14.10 | |
| 3rd place, bronze medalist(s) | 3 | Colleen Young | United States | 1:15.69 | AM |
| 4 | 7 | Mariia Latritskaia | RPC | 1:17.59 | |
| 5 | 6 | Anastasiya Zudzilava | Belarus | 1:19.77 | |
| 6 | 1 | Shokhsanamkhon Toshpulatova | Uzbekistan | 1:19.99 | |
| 7 | 2 | Róisín Ní Riain | Ireland | 1:20.34 | |
| 8 | 8 | Marlene Endrolath | Germany | 1:20.79 | |
