= 2019 World Para Swimming Championships – Men's 100 metre butterfly =

The men's 100m butterfly events at the 2019 World Para Swimming Championships were held in the London Aquatics Centre at the Queen Elizabeth Olympic Park in London between 9–15 September.

== Medalists ==
Event	Gold	Silver	Bronze
S8	Dimosthenis Michalentzakis; Greece	Robert Griswold; United States	Michal Golus; Poland
S9	Simone Barlaam; Italy	Federico Morlacchi; Italy	Alexander Skaliukh; Russia
S10	Maksym Krypak; Ukraine	Stefano Raimondi; Italy	Col Pearse; Australia
S11	Keiichi Kimura; Japan	Uchu Tomita; Japan	Kirill Belousov; Russia
S12	Dzmitry Salei; Belarus	Stephen Clegg; Great Britain	Yaroslav Denysenko; Ukraine
S13	Ihar Boki; Belarus	Islam Aslanov; Uzbekistan	Oleksii Virchenko; Ukraine
S14	Reece Dunn; Great Britain	Lawrence Sapp; United States	Dai Tokairin; Japan
