= Swimming at the 2020 Summer Paralympics – Women's 100 metre butterfly S13 =

Women's 100 metre freestyle S13 at the XVI Paralympic Games
- Venue: Tokyo Aquatics Centre
- Dates: 25 August 2021
- Competitors: 18 from 13 nations

Medalists
1st place, gold medalist(s)		Carlotta Gilli	Italy
2nd place, silver medalist(s)		Alessia Berra	Italy
3rd place, bronze medalist(s)		Daria Pikalova	RPC

The Women's 100 metre butterfly S13 event at the 2020 Paralympic Games took place on 25 August 2021 at the Tokyo Aquatics Centre.

== Heats ==
The swimmers with the top eight times, regardless of heat, advanced to the final.

Rank	Heat	Lane	Name	Nationality	Time	Notes
1	3	4	Carlotta Gilli	Italy	1:04.16	Q
2	1	4	Daria Pikalova	RPC	1:06.20	Q
3	2	4	Shokhsanamkhon Toshpulatova	Uzbekistan	1:06.24	Q
4	3	3	Makayla Nietzel	United States	1:07.21	Q
5	2	5	Maria Carolina Gomes	Brazil	1:07.30	Q
6	3	5	Alessia Berra	Italy	1:07.42	Q
7	1	5	Gia Pergolini	United States	1:07.79	Q
8	1	6	Roisin Ni Riain	Ireland	1:08.18	Q
9	2	3	Joanna Mendak	Poland	1:08.41	
10	1	2	Lucilene da Silva	Brazil	1:10.93	
11	3	2	Muslima Odilova	Uzbekistan	1:11.78	
12	3	7	Kirralee Hayes	Australia	1:12.68	
13	2	2	Martha Ruether	United States	1:13.08	
14	2	6	Nigorakhon Mirzokhidova	Uzbekistan	1:13.21	
15	1	3	Ariadna Edo Beltran	Spain	1:14.60	
16	3	6	Marlene Endrolath	Germany	1:15.53	
17	1	7	Alani Ferreira	South Africa	1:20.25	
18	2	7	Sophie Soon	Singapore	1:28.61	

== Final ==
Rank	Lane	Name	Nationality	Time	Notes
1st place, gold medalist(s)	4	Carlotta Gilli	Italy	1:02.65	PR
2nd place, silver medalist(s)	7	Alessia Berra	Italy	1:05.67	
3rd place, bronze medalist(s)	5	Daria Pikalova	RPC	1:05.86	
4	3	Shokhsanamkhon Toshpulatova	Uzbekistan	1:06.21	
5	1	Gia Pergolini	United States	1:06.46	
6	2	Maria Carolina Gomes Santiago	Brazil	1:07.11	
7	6	Makayla Nietzel	United States	1:08.00	
8	8	Roisin Ni Riain	Ireland	1:09.26	
