= Uzbekistan at the 2020 Summer Paralympics =

- Flag of Uzbekistan
- IPC code: UZB
- NPC: Uzbekistan National Paralympic Association

in Tokyo, Japan August 24, 2021 – September 5, 2021
- Competitors: 44 in 8 sports
- Medals Ranked 16th: Gold 8 Silver 5 Bronze 6 Total 19

Summer Paralympics appearances (overview)
- 2004; 2008; 2012; 2016; 2020; 2024

Other related appearances
- Soviet Union (1988); Unified Team (1992)

Uzbekistan competed at the 2020 Summer Paralympics in Tokyo, Japan, from 24 August to 5 September 2021.

== Medalists ==
Medal	Name	Sport	Event	Date
Gold	Uchkun Kuranbaev	Judo	Men's 66 kg	27 August
Gold	Nozimakhon Kayumova	Athletics	Women's javelin throw F13	28 August
Gold	Mokhigul Khamdamova	Athletics	Women's discus throw F57	28 August
Gold	Feruz Sayidov	Judo	Men's 73 kg	28 August
Gold	Bobirjon Omonov	Athletics	Men's shot put F41	30 August
Gold	Khusniddin Norbekov	Athletics	Men's shot put F35	2 September
Gold	Safiya Burkhanova	Athletics	Women's shot put F12	3 September
Gold	Guljonoy Naimova	Taekwondo	Women's +58kg	4 September
Silver	Asila Mirzayorova	Athletics	Women's long jump T11	27 August
Silver	Ruza Kuzieva	Powerlifting	Women's 61 kg	28 August
Silver	Parvina Samandarova	Judo	Women's 57 kg	28 August
Silver	Davurkhon Karomatov	Judo	Men's 81 kg	28 August
Silver	Nurkhon Kurbanova	Athletics	Women's javelin throw F54	4 September
Bronze	Islam Aslanov	Swimming	Men's 100 metre butterfly S13	25 August
Bronze	Elbek Sultonov	Athletics	Men's shot put F12	28 August
Bronze	Nafisa Sheripboeva	Judo	Women's 63 kg	28 August
Bronze	Sharif Khalilov	Judo	Men's 100 kg	29 August
Bronze	Nurkhon Kurbanova	Athletics	Women's shot put F54	30 August
Bronze	Shokhsanamkhon Toshpulatova	Swimming	Women's 200 metre individual medley SM13	30 August

== Competitors ==
#	Sport	Men	Women	Total	Events
1	Athletics	8	8	16	22
2	Judo	7	3	10	10
3	Canoeing	2	1	3	3
4	Powerlifting	2	1	3	3
5	Rowing	1	1	2	1
6	Shooting	1	0	1	2
7	Swimming	3	3	6	20
8	Taekwondo	1	2	3	3
Total		25	19	44	64

== Athletics ==
16 athlete in 22 events have been selected to compete for Uzbekistan at the 2020 Summer Paralympics including Doniyor Saliev who qualified for the men's long jump T12 event after winning the gold medal in the men's long jump T12 event at the 2019 World Para Athletics Championships. Nozimakhon Kayumova qualified for the women's javelin throw F13 event after winning the bronze medal at the 2019 World Para Athletics Championships. Safiya Burkhanova qualified for the women's shot put F12 event after winning the silver medal at the 2019 World Para Athletics Championships.

Number	Athlete	Event	Rank
Men's Field
1	Temurbek Giyazov	Men's high jump T64	6
2	Khusniddin Norbekov	Men's shot put F35	1st place, gold medalist(s)
3	Bobirjon Omonov	Men's shot put F41	1st place, gold medalist(s)
4	Doniyor Saliev	Men's long jump T12	4
5	Elbek Sultonov	Men's shot put F12	3rd place, bronze medalist(s)
6	Izzat Turgunov	Men's long jump T36	NM
7	Yorkinbek Odilov	Men's javelin throw F57	4
8	Yorkinbek Odilov	Men's shot put F57	9
9	Mukhammad Rikhsimov	Men's shot put F63	6
Women's Field
10	Safiya Burkhanova	Women's shot put F12	1st place, gold medalist(s)
11	Nozimakhon Kayumova	Women's javelin throw F13	1st place, gold medalist(s)
12	Asila Mirzayorova	Women's long jump T11	2nd place, silver medalist(s)
13	Yokutkhon Kholbekova	Women's long jump T12	4
14	Dilafruzkhon Akhmatkhonova	Women's shot put F35	4
15	Nurkhon Kurbanova	Women's shot put F54	3rd place, bronze medalist(s)
16	Nurkhon Kurbanova	Women's javelin throw F54	2nd place, silver medalist(s)
17	Nurkhon Kurbanova	Women's discus throw F55	8
18	Mokhigul Khamdamova	Women's shot put F57	9
19	Mokhigul Khamdamova	Women's discus throw F57	1st place, gold medalist(s)
20	Sabina Sukhanova	Women's long jump T37	5
Women's Track
21	Sabina Sukhanova	Women's 100m T37	7
22	Sabina Sukhanova	Women's 200m T37	DNS

== Canoeing ==
Uzbekistan has sent three athlete in Men's KL2, VL3 & Women's KL3 events.

Athlete	Event	Rank
Men
Azizbek Abdulkhabibov	KL2	8
Khaytmurot Sherkuziev	VL3	
Women
Shakhnoza Mirzaeva	KL3	

== Powerlifting ==
Athlete	Event	Result	Rank
Men
Farhod Umirzakov	Men's 88 kg	212	4
Nuriddin Davlatov	Men's 107 kg	NM	-
Women
Ruza Kuzieva	Women's 61 kg	130	2nd place, silver medalist(s)

== Judo ==
Number	Athlete	Event	Rank
Men
1	Sherzod Namozov	Men's –60kg	5
2	Uchkun Kuranbaev	Men's –66kg	1st place, gold medalist(s)
3	Feruz Sayidov	Men's –73kg	1st place, gold medalist(s)
4	Davurkhon Karomatov	Men's –81kg	2nd place, silver medalist(s)
5	Shukhrat Boboev	Men's –90kg	7
6	Sharif Khalilov	Men's –100kg	3rd place, bronze medalist(s)
7	Shirin Sharipov	Men's +100kg	5
Women
8	Parvina Samandarova	Women's –57kg	2nd place, silver medalist(s)
9	Nafisa Sheripboeva	Women's –63kg	3rd place, bronze medalist(s)
10	Vasila Aliboeva	Women's –70kg	DNS

== Rowing ==
Athlete	Event	Rank
Feruza Buriboeva; Otabek Kuchkorov	Mixed double	11

== Shooting ==
Athlete	Event	Rank
Server Ibragimov	10 m air pistol standing SH1	5
Server Ibragimov	50 m pistol SH1	

== Swimming ==
Uzbekistan is scheduled to compete 6 athlete in 20 events in swimming at the 2020 Summer Paralympics.

Number	Athlete	Event	Rank
Men
1	Islam Aslanov	100 m butterfly S13	3rd place, bronze medalist(s)
2	Islam Aslanov	100 m backstroke S13	11
3	Islam Aslanov	50 m freestyle S13	4
4	Muzaffar Tursunkhujaev	100 m butterfly S13	5
5	Muzaffar Tursunkhujaev	100 m backstroke S13	9
6	Muzaffar Tursunkhujaev	50 m freestyle S13	9
7	Firdavsbek Musabekov	100 m breaststroke SB13	4
8	Firdavsbek Musabekov	200 m medley SM13	10
Women
9	Nigorakhon Mirzokhidova	100 m butterfly S13	14
10	Nigorakhon Mirzokhidova	100 m backstroke S13	7
11	Nigorakhon Mirzokhidova	50 m freestyle S13	19
12	Nigorakhon Mirzokhidova	100 m breaststroke SB13	14
13	Nigorakhon Mirzokhidova	200 m medley SM13	9
14	Shokhsanamkhon Toshpulatova	100 m butterfly S13	4
15	Shokhsanamkhon Toshpulatova	100 m backstroke S13	5
16	Shokhsanamkhon Toshpulatova	50 m freestyle S13	14
17	Shokhsanamkhon Toshpulatova	100 m breaststroke SB13	6
18	Shokhsanamkhon Toshpulatova	400 m freestyle S13	4
19	Shokhsanamkhon Toshpulatova	200 m medley SM13	3rd place, bronze medalist(s)
20	Muslima Odilova	100 m butterfly S13	11

== Taekwondo ==
3 athlete have been selected to compete for Uzbekistan at the 2020 Summer Paralympics

Athlete	Event	Rank
Men
Zukhriddin Tokhirov	Men's 61 kg	9
Women
Ziyodakhon Isakova	Women's 49 kg	5
Guljonoy Naimova	Women's +58 kg	1st place, gold medalist(s)

== See also ==
- Uzbekistan at the Paralympics
- Uzbekistan at the 2020 Summer Olympics
