= Belarus at the 2020 Summer Paralympics =

- IOC code: BLR
- NOC: Belarus Paralympic Committee
- Website: www.noc.by (in Russian and English)

in Tokyo
- Competitors: 19 in 6 sports
- Medals: Gold 5 Silver 1 Bronze 1 Total 7

Summer Paralympics appearances (overview)
- 1996; 2000; 2004; 2008; 2012; 2016; 2020; 2024

Other related appearances
- Soviet Union (1988); Unified Team (1992)

Belarus competed at the 2020 Summer Paralympics in Tokyo, Japan, from 24 August to 5 September 2021.

== Medalists ==
Medal	Name	Sport	Event	Date
Gold	Ihar Boki	Swimming	Men's 100 metre butterfly S13	25 August
Gold	Ihar Boki	Swimming	Men's 100 metre backstroke S13	26 August
Gold	Ihar Boki	Swimming	Men's 400 metre freestyle S13	27 August
Gold	Ihar Boki	Swimming	Men's 50 metre freestyle S13	29 August
Gold	Ihar Boki	Swimming	Men's 200 metre individual medley SM13	30 August
Silver	Yahor Shchalkanau	Swimming	Men's 100 metre backstroke S9	30 August
Bronze	Lizaveta Piatrenka	Athletics	Women's javelin throw F13	28 August

== Competitors ==
The following is the list of number of competitors participating in the Games:

Sport	Men	Women	Total
Athletics	2	2	4
Judo	0	1	1
Paracanoe	1	0	1
Rowing	0	1	1
Swimming	8	2	10
Wheelchair fencing	1	1	2
Total	12	7	19

== Athletics ==
Men's field

Athlete	Event	Final	
Athlete	Event	Result	Rank
Siarhei Burdukou	Long jump T12	6.74	6
Uladzislau Hryb	Club throw F51	27.47	6

Women's field

Athlete	Event	Final	
Athlete	Event	Result	Rank
Anna Kaniuk	Long jump T12	4.95	6
Lizaveta Piatrenka	Javelin throw F13	38.99	3rd place, bronze medalist(s)

== Judo ==
Women

Athlete	Event	Round of 16	Quarterfinals	Semifinals	Repechage 1	Repechage 2	Final / BM
Athlete	Event	Opposition Result	Opposition Result	Opposition Result	Opposition Result	Opposition Result	Opposition Result
Elena Bogdanova	-57kg	Hirose (JPN); L 00–10	did not advance				

== Paracanoeing ==
Athlete	Event	Heats		Semifinal		Final	
Athlete	Event	Result	Rank	Result	Rank	Result	Rank
Ilya Taupianets	Men's VL2	1:02.429	5	59.736	4	did not advance	

== Rowing ==
Belarus qualified one boats in the women's single sculls events for the games by winning the gold medal at the 2021 FISA European Qualification Regatta in Varese, Italy.

Athlete	Event	Heats		Repechage		Final	
Athlete	Event	Time	Rank	Time	Rank	Time	Rank
Liudmila Vauchok	Women's single sculls	13:26.45	5 R	12:20.24	4 FB	13:31.36	9

Qualification Legend: FA=Final A (medal); FB=Final B (non-medal); R=Repechage

== Swimming ==
Ten Belarusian swimmer has successfully entered the paralympic slot after breaking the MQS.

Men

Athlete	Event	Heats		Final	
Athlete	Event	Result	Rank	Result	Rank
Ihar Boki	50m freestyle S13	23.44	1 Q	23.21 PR	1st place, gold medalist(s)
Ihar Boki	400m freestyle S13	4:06.02	1 Q	3:58.18	1st place, gold medalist(s)
Ihar Boki	100m backstroke S13	57.67	1 Q	56.36 WR	1st place, gold medalist(s)
Ihar Boki	100m breaststroke SB13	1:05.86	4 Q	1:05.90	5
Ihar Boki	100m butterfly S13	55.12	1 Q	53.80 PR	1st place, gold medalist(s)
Ihar Boki	200m individual medley SM13	2:08.24	1 Q	2:02.70 WR	1st place, gold medalist(s)
Uladzimir Izotau	100m breaststroke SB12	—N/a		1:07.11	4
Dzmitry Salei	50m freestyle S13	24.42	7 Q	24.23	6
Dzmitry Salei	100m butterfly S13	58.80	7 Q	58.15	6
Yahor Shchalkanau	50m freestyle S9	26.34	8 Q	25.96	8
Yahor Shchalkanau	100m backstroke S9	1:02.42	1 Q	1:01.96	2nd place, silver medalist(s)
Yahor Shchalkanau	100m butterfly S9	1:02.17	8 Q	1:01.38	7
Yahor Shchalkanau	200m individual medley SM9	2:20.00	2 Q	2:18.40	4
Uladzimir Sotnikau	50m freestyle S13	25.73	14	did not advance	
Uladzimir Sotnikau	100m backstroke S13	1:06.21	10	did not advance	
Uladzimir Sotnikau	100m butterfly S13	1:03.68	13	did not advance	
Aliaksei Talai	200m freestyle S2	6:06.97	11	did not advance	
Aliaksei Talai	50m backstroke S1	—N/a		1:55.58	7
Aliaksei Talai	100m backstroke S1	—N/a		4:01.23	7
Aliaksei Talai	50m breaststroke SB2	1:24.86	7 Q	1:23.16	7
Aliaksei Talai	150m individual medley SM3	5:06.04	13	did not advance	
Maksim Vashkevich	100m freestyle S12	did not start		did not advance	
Maksim Vashkevich	100m backstroke S12	—N/a		did not start	
Maksim Vashkevich	100m butterfly S12	1:01.87	8 Q	1:01.43	7
Maksim Vashkevich	200m individual medley SM13	did not start		did not advance	
Hryhory Zudzilau	50m freestyle S11	did not start		did not advance	
Hryhory Zudzilau	400m freestyle S11	did not start		did not advance	
Hryhory Zudzilau	200m individual medley SM11	did not start		did not advance	

Women

Athlete	Event	Heats		Final	
Athlete	Event	Result	Rank	Result	Rank
Natalia Shavel	50m backstroke S5	50.48	11	did not advance	
Natalia Shavel	100m breaststroke SB4	2:04.62	6 Q	2:02.58	7
Natalia Shavel	50m butterfly S5	50.19	10	did not advance	
Natalia Shavel	200m individual medley SM5	—N/a		3:44.30	5
Anastasiya Zudzilava	100m breaststroke SB13	1:20.09	4 Q	1:19.77	5
Anastasiya Zudzilava	200m individual medley SM13	2:40.18	8 Q	2:42.13	8

== Wheelchair fencing ==
Men

Athlete	Event	Group Stage							Round of 16	Quarterfinals	Semifinals	Final / BM	
Athlete	Event	Opposition Result	Opposition Result	Opposition Result	Opposition Result	Opposition Result	Opposition Result	Rank	Opposition Result	Opposition Result	Opposition Result	Opposition Result	Rank
Andrei Pranevich	Épée B	Tarjanyi (HUN); W 5-1	Guissone (BRA); L 4-5	Kurzin (RPC); W 5-4	Naumenko (UKR); W 5-4	Kurzin (RPC); W 5-1	Daoliang (CHN); W 5-3	3 Q	Bye	Naumenko (UKR); W 15-10	Kuzyukov (RPC); L 13-15	Coutya (GBR); L 11-15	4
Andrei Pranevich	Sabre B	Onda (JPN); W 5-3	Triantafyllou (GRE); L 3-5	Kamalov (RPC); L 2-5	Feng (CHN); L 1-5	Ali (IRQ); W 5-2	Castro (POL); L 2-5	10 Q	Triantafyllou (GRE); L 7-15	did not advance			

Women

Athlete	Event	Group Stage							Round of 16	Quarterfinals	Semifinals	Final / BM	
Athlete	Event	Opposition Result	Opposition Result	Opposition Result	Opposition Result	Opposition Result	Opposition Result	Rank	Opposition Result	Opposition Result	Opposition Result	Opposition Result	Rank
Alesia Makrytskaya	Foil B	Sukari (JPN); W 5-1	Zhou (CHN); L 3-5	Geddes (USA); W 5-3	Mezo (HUN); L 3-5	Mishurova (RPC); L 4-5	Tauber (GER); W 5-2	6 Q	Bye	Xiao (CHN); L 4-15	did not advance		
Alesia Makrytskaya	Épée B	Zhou (CHN); L 5-15	Boykova (RPC); L 4-5	Hareza (POL); W 5-2	Sukari (JPN); W 5-2	Chung (HKG); W 5-0	Hayes (USA); W 5-1	4 Q	Bye	Jana (THA); L 5-15	did not advance		

== See also ==
- Belarus at the Paralympics
- Belarus at the 2020 Summer Olympics
