= Robert Griswold =

American Paralympic swimmer (born 1996)

Personal information
- Born: November 27, 1996 (age 29) Hickory, North Carolina, U.S.
- Home town: Freehold, New Jersey, U.S.
- Height: 6 ft 0 in (183 cm)
- Weight: 160 lb (73 kg)

Sport
- Country: United States
- Sport: Swimming
- Strokes: Backstroke, freestyle, butterfly
- Classifications: S8, SB7, SM8
- College team: Carson-Newman University, Fresno Pacific University, and Indiana State University
Medal record
Men's Paralympic swimming
Representing the United States
Paralympic Games
Gold medal – first place	2020 Tokyo	100 m backstroke S8
Gold medal – first place	2020 Tokyo	100 m butterfly S8
Bronze medal – third place	2016 Rio de Janeiro	100 m backstroke S8
World Championships
Gold medal – first place	2017 Mexico City	100 m backstroke S8
Gold medal – first place	2019 London	100 m backstroke S8
Gold medal – first place	2019 London	200 m ind. medley SM8
Gold medal – first place	2022 Madeira	100 m backstroke S8
Gold medal – first place	2022 Madeira	100 m butterfly S8
Gold medal – first place	2022 Madeira	200 m ind. medley SM8
Silver medal – second place	2017 Mexico City	200 m ind. medley SM8
Silver medal – second place	2017 Mexico City	400 m freestyle S8
Silver medal – second place	2019 London	400 m freestyle S8
Silver medal – second place	2019 London	100 m butterfly S8
Silver medal – second place	2022 Madeira	100 m freestyle S8
Silver medal – second place	2022 Madeira	4x100 m freestyle relay 34pts
Bronze medal – third place	2015 Glasgow	400 m freestyle S8
Bronze medal – third place	2017 Mexico City	4x100 m medley relay 34pts
Bronze medal – third place	2022 Madeira	400 m freestyle S8

Robert Griswold (born November 27, 1996) is an American swimmer. He was a member of the 2016 and 2020 U.S. Paralympic Swimming Teams. He holds multiple American and world paralympic swimming records in freestyle, backstroke, butterfly, and individual medleys. He competes in the Paralympic classes S8/SB7/SM8, and has cerebral palsy that affects coordination and strength. The United States Center for SafeSport temporarily suspended Griswold in 2020, reinstated him prior to the 2021 Paralympic Games, and then temporarily suspended him again in 2022, after he was accused of raping a fellow member of the US Paralympic Team at the 2021 Paralympic Games and thereafter; Griswold was later removed as a member of the US National Team.

== Early life ==
Griswold was born in Hickory, North Carolina, lived in Freehold Borough, New Jersey, and now lives in Colorado Springs, Colorado. Raised in Freehold Township, New Jersey, he began swimming at the age of six at the Ocean County YMCA. He competed for his high school swimming team, and was team captain and MVP. Outside of athletics, he earned an Eagle Scout rank in the Scouts BSA program of the Boy Scouts of America, and organized a Paralympic Swimming Clinic to educate the community about disabilities and available opportunities. He graduated from Freehold Township High School in 2015.

== Collegiate swimming career ==
Griswold competed for two NCAA Division II schools, Carson-Newman University in Tennessee and Fresno Pacific University in California during his NCAA swimming career that began fall 2015. He also competed for Indiana State University, where graduated from in 2020 with a bachelor's degree in communications. After college he began clerking at a law firm in St. Louis, Missouri.

== International swimming career ==
Griswold competed at his first international meet in 2014, and rose to prominence within the S8 classification initially gaining success in the distance freestyle events, winning his first world championships bronze in 2015.

He followed up his World Championships medals by qualifying for the Rio 2016 Paralympic Games and winning a bronze medal in the 100 m backstroke. He also placed fourth in the 200 m individual medley and fifth in the 400 m freestyle.

In 2016 began an era of dominance in the S8 100m backstroke, winning the event at the 2017 World Championships and 2019 World Championships. He carried his success into the 2020 Tokyo Paralympic Games by winning the gold medal by 4.27 seconds and breaking the world record.

At the 2017 World Championships he was the most decorated American male, with two gold medals and two silver medals and was honored by being chosen as the flagbearer at the opening ceremonies.

In addition to his gold medal in the 100m backstroke, Griswold won a gold medal in the 100m butterfly at the 2020 Tokyo Paralympic Games. He placed fourth in the 200 m individual medley and fifth in the 400 m freestyle.

At the 2022 World Para Swimming Championships, Griswold claimed his third consecutive title in the 100 m backstroke S8. He also claimed world titles in the 100 m butterfly and 200 m individual medley. Griswold won silver medals in the 100 m freestyle and the 4x100 freestyle relay 34pts and a bronze medal in the 400 m freestyle.

== Sexual assault allegations and lawsuit ==
In September 2020, the United States Center for SafeSport listed Griswold in its disciplinary database as having temporary restrictions for allegations of misconduct (which could cover a range of degrees of physical, emotional or sexual abuse). One month later, SafeSport confirmed that Griswold was eligible to compete at the Paralympic Games.

SafeSport's public disciplinary database indicated that Griswold was temporarily suspended on August 23, 2022, for allegations of misconduct in violation of the SafeSport Code, prohibiting him from practicing or competing at any event or facility under the U.S.O.P.C. or a national sports governing body while he was being investigated by SafeSport.

On October 20, 2022, SwimSwam detailed allegations of sexual assault against Griswold. He has been accused of repeatedly raping and sexually abusing Parker Egbert, a fellow member of the United States Paralympic Team, at the Paralympic Games and thereafter, including in the room that SafeSport allowed Griswold to share with the claimant at the Paralympic Games in 2021. Egbert, who is intellectually disabled and has autism, and has the mental capacity of a 5-year-old according to court filings, says that he was groomed by Griswold, and threatened with retaliation.

Griswold was later removed as a member of the 2022 USA National Team.

Egbert filed a civil lawsuit on November 11, 2022, against Griswold, the U.S. Center for SafeSport (for negligence, claiming SafeSport failed to protect Egbert from Griswold, despite previous complaints of sexual assault by Griswold having been made to SafeSport in 2020), and the U.S. Olympic & Paralympic Committee in federal court in Colorado. The complaint alleged: "Remarkably, Defendant USOPC and Defendant U.S. Center for SafeSport ("SafeSport") allowed Griswold to supervise and share a bedroom with Plaintiff without any oversight, despite the fact that USOPC and SafeSport had received reports that Griswold was sexually assaulting other teammates," that "USOPC and SafeSport failed to inform Plaintiff's parents of the risks to their son due to his intimate and continuing proximity to Griswold, a known (or at the very least, suspected) sexual predator," and that "since its creation, SafeSport has faced significant scrutiny for its botched handling of abuse claims." According to the complaint, the accuser suffered injuries that required rectal surgery.
