= Ukraine at the 2020 Summer Paralympics =

- Flag of Ukraine
- IPC code: UKR
- NPC: National Sports Committee for the Disabled of Ukraine
- Website: www.paralympic.org.ua

in Tokyo, Japan 24 August 2021 – 5 September 2021
- Competitors: 138
- Medals: Gold 24 Silver 47 Bronze 27 Total 98

Summer Paralympics appearances (overview)
- 1996; 2000; 2004; 2008; 2012; 2016; 2020; 2024

Other related appearances
- Soviet Union (1988); Unified Team (1992)

Ukraine competed at the 2020 Summer Paralympics in Tokyo, Japan, from 24 August to 5 September 2021. This was their seventh consecutive appearance at the Summer Paralympics since 1996.

== Medalists ==
Medal	Name	Sport	Event	Date
Gold	Yelyzaveta Mereshko	Swimming	Women's 50 metre freestyle S6	25 August
Gold	Mariana Shevchuk	Powerlifting	Women's 55 kg	27 August
Gold	Anna Stetsenko	Swimming	Women's 400 metre freestyle S13	27 August
Gold	Ievgenii Bogodaiko	Swimming	Men's 100 metre breaststroke SB6	28 August
Gold	Maksym Krypak	Swimming	Men's 100 metre freestyle S10	28 August
Gold	Mykhailo Serbin	Swimming	Men's 100 metre backstroke S11	28 August
Gold	Denys Dubrov	Swimming	Men's 200 metre individual medley SM8	28 August
Gold	Yelyzaveta Mereshko	Swimming	Women's 100 metre breaststroke SB5	28 August
Gold	Oksana Zubkovska	Athletics	Women's long jump T12	29 August
Gold	Roman Polianskyi	Rowing	Men's single sculls	29 August
Gold	Maryna Lytovchenko	Table tennis	Women's individual class 6	30 August
Gold	Andrii Trusov	Swimming	Men's 100 metre backstroke S7	30 August
Gold	Andrii Trusov	Swimming	Men's 50 metre freestyle S7	31 August
Gold	Maksym Krypak	Swimming	Men's 100 metre butterfly S10	31 August
Gold	Maksym Koval	Athletics	Men's shot put F20	31 August
Gold	Maksym Krypak	Swimming	Men's 400 metre freestyle S10	1 September
Gold	Anastasiia Moskalenko	Athletics	Women's shot put F32	1 September
Gold	Mariia Pomazan	Athletics	Women's shot put F35	2 September
Gold	Vladyslav Zahrebelnyi	Athletics	Men's long jump T37	2 September
Gold	Maksym Krypak	Swimming	Men's 100 metre backstroke S10	2 September
Gold	Serhii Yemelianov	Paracanoeing	Men's KL3	3 September
Gold	Maksym Krypak	Swimming	Men's 200 metre individual medley SM10	3 September
Gold	Denys Ostapchenko	Swimming	Men's 200 metre freestyle S3	3 September
Gold	Zoia Ovsii	Athletics	Women's club throw F51	3 September
Silver	Anton Kol	Swimming	Men's 100 metre backstroke S1	25 August
Silver	Artem Manko	Wheelchair fencing	Men's sabre A	25 August
Silver	Olena Fedota	Wheelchair fencing	Women's sabre B	25 August
Silver	Maksym Krypak	Swimming	Men's 50 metre freestyle S10	25 August
Silver	Oleksii Virchenko	Swimming	Men's 100 metre butterfly S13	25 August
Silver	Yelyzaveta Mereshko	Swimming	Women's 200 metre individual medley SM6	26 August
Silver	Vladyslav Bilyi	Athletics	Men's javelin throw F38	27 August
Silver	Sergii Klippert	Swimming	Men's 100 metre backstroke S12	27 August
Silver	Kateryna Denysenko	Swimming	Women's 100 metre backstroke S8	27 August
Silver	Andrii Trusov	Swimming	Men's 200 metre individual medley SM7	27 August
Silver	Kyrylo Garashchenko	Swimming	Men's 400 metre freestyle S13	27 August
Silver	Nataliia Mandryk; Yevheniia Breus; Olena Fedota	Wheelchair fencing	Women's épée team	27 August
Silver	Anastasiia Moskalenko	Athletics	Women's club throw F32	27 August
Silver	Roman Danyliuk	Athletics	Men's shot put F12	28 August
Silver	Iryna Husieva	Judo	Women's 63 kg	28 August
Silver	Viktor Smyrnov	Swimming	Men's 100 metre backstroke S11	28 August
Silver	Nataliia Morkvych	Wheelchair fencing	Women's foil A	28 August
Silver	Andrii Trusov	Swimming	Men's 400 metre freestyle S7	29 August
Silver	Nataliia Oliinyk	Powerlifting	Women's 79 kg	29 August
Silver	Denys Ostapchenko	Swimming	Men's 50 metre backstroke S3	29 August
Silver	Illia Yaremenko	Swimming	Men's 50 metre freestyle S13	29 August
Silver	Andrii Doroshenko	Shooting	Men's R1 10 metre air rifle standing SH1	30 August
Silver	Anastasia Mysnyk	Athletics	Women's shot put F20	29 August
Silver	Viktor Didukh	Table tennis	Men's individual class 8	30 August
Silver	Mykhailo Serbin	Swimming	Men's 200 metre individual medley SM11	30 August
Silver	Ihor Tsvietov	Athletics	Men's 100 metres T35	30 August
Silver	Iana Lebiedieva	Athletics	Women's discus throw F53	30 August
Silver	Oksana Boturchuk	Athletics	Women's 400 metres T12	31 August
Silver	Yehor Dementyev	Cycling	Men's road time trial C5	31 August
Silver	Maksym Veraksa	Swimming	Men's 100 metre freestyle S12	31 August
Silver	Oleksandr Yarovyi	Athletics	Men's shot put#F20	31 August
Silver	Yuliia Shuliar	Athletics	Women's 400 metres T20	31 August
Silver	Nataliia Kobzar	Athletics	Women's 400 metres T37	31 August
Silver	Vasyl Kovalchuk	Shooting	Mixed R5 10 metre air rifle prone SH2	1 September
Silver	Oleksii Fedyna	Swimming	Men's 100 metre breaststroke SB12	1 September
Silver	Yelyzaveta Mereshko	Swimming	Women's 400 metre freestyle S6	2 September
Silver	Viktor Didukh; Maksym Nikolenko	Table tennis	Men's team class 8	2 September
Silver	Anton Kol	Swimming	Men's 50 metre backstroke S1	2 September
Silver	Oksana Boturchuk	Athletics	Women's 100 metres T12	2 September
Silver	Liudmyla Danylina	Athletics	Women's 1500 metres T20	3 September
Silver	Mykola Syniuk	Paracanoeing	Men's KL2	3 September
Silver	Yehor Dementyev	Cycling	Men's road race C4–5	3 September
Silver	Mykola Zhabnyak	Athletics	Men's discus throw F37	3 September
Silver	Andrii Trusov	Swimming	Men's 50 metre butterfly S7	3 September
Silver	Ihor Tsvietov	Athletics	Men's 200 metres T35	4 September
Silver	Maryna Mazhula	Paracanoeing	Women's KL1	4 September
Silver	Oksana Boturchuk	Athletics	Women's 200 metres T12	4 September
Bronze	Yevheniia Breus	Wheelchair fencing	Women's sabre A	25 August
Bronze	Anna Hontar	Swimming	Women's 50 metre freestyle S6	25 August
Bronze	Yuliia Pavlenko	Athletics	Women's long jump T11	27 August
Bronze	Yehor Dementyev	Cycling	Men's individual pursuit C5	27 August
Bronze	Yuliia Ivanytska	Judo	Women's 48 kg	27 August
Bronze	Nataliya Nikolaychyk	Judo	Women's 52 kg	27 August
Bronze	Ivan Mai	Table tennis	Men's individual class 9	28 August
Bronze	Maksym Nikolenko	Table tennis	Men's individual class 8	28 August
Bronze	Rufat Mahomedov	Judo	Men's 73 kg	28 August
Bronze	Oleksandr Nazarenko	Judo	Men's 90 kg	29 August
Bronze	Maksym Veraksa	Swimming	Men's 50 metre freestyle S13	29 August
Bronze	Iryna Shchetnik	Shooting	Women's R2 10 metre air rifle standing SH1	30 August
Bronze	Iurii Bozhynskyi; Denys Dubrov; Andrii Trusov; Maksym Krypak	Swimming	Men's 4 x 100 metre freestyle relay	30 August
Bronze	Roman Pavlyk	Athletics	Men's long jump T36	30 August
Bronze	Zoia Ovsii	Athletics	Women's discus throw	30 August
Bronze	Vasyl Krainyk	Swimming	Men's 200 metre individual medley SM14	31 August
Bronze	Ievgenii Bogodaiko	Swimming	Men's 50 metre freestyle S7	31 August
Bronze	Yelyzaveta Mereshko	Swimming	Women's 100 metre freestyle S7	31 August
Bronze	Maryna Piddubna; Maksym Veraksa; Anna Stetsenko; Kyrylo Garashchenko	Swimming	Mixed 4 x 100 metre freestyle relay 49pts	31 August
Bronze	Iryna Shchetnik	Shooting	Mixed R3 10 metre air rifle prone SH1	1 September
Bronze	Ivan Mai; Lev Kats	Table tennis	Men's team – Class 9–10	1 September
Bronze	Yana Berezhna	Swimming	Women's 100 metre breaststroke SB11	1 September
Bronze	Yaryna Matlo	Swimming	Women's 100 metre breaststroke SB12	1 September
Bronze	Oleksii Denysiuk	Shooting	Mixed P3 25 metre pistol SH1	2 September
Bronze	Denys Ostapchenko	Swimming	Men's 50 metre freestyle S3	2 September
Bronze	Denys Dubrov	Swimming	Men's 100 metre butterfly S8	3 September
Bronze	Vasyl Kovalchuk	Shooting	Mixed R9 50 metre rifle prone SH2	4 September

== Archery ==
Ukraine collected two quota places (one male, one female) at the 2019 Para Archery World Championships held in Den Bosch, Netherlands.

== Athletics ==
Mykyta Senyk, Ihor Tsvietov, Roman Pavlyk, Oleksandr Doroshenko, Leilia Adzhametova and Oxana Boturchuk are among the Ukrainian athletes who qualified for the 2020 Summer Paralympics.

Men's track

Athlete	Event	Heats		Final	
Athlete	Event	Result	Rank	Result	Rank
Ihor Tsvietov	Men's 100m T35				
Ihor Tsvietov	Men's 200m T35				
Pavlo Voluikevych	Men's 1500m T20				

Men's field

Athlete	Event	Final		
Athlete	Event	Result	Points	Rank
Roman Danyliuk	Men's shot put F12			
Oleksandr Doroshenko	Men's javelin throw F38			
Maksym Koval	Men's shot put F20			
Oleksandr Lytvynenko	Men's long jump T36			
Roman Novak	Men's javelin throw F64			
Roman Pavlyk	Men's long jump T36			
Volodymyr Ponomerenko	Men's shot put F12			
Mykyta Senyk	Men's long jump T38			
Vladyslav Zahrebelnyi	Men's long jump T37			

Women's track

Athlete	Event	Heats		Final	
Athlete	Event	Result	Rank	Result	Rank
Leilia Adzhametova	Women's 100m T13				
Leilia Adzhametova	Women's 400m T13				
Oksana Boturchuk	Women's 200m T12				
Oksana Boturchuk	Women's 400m T12				
Liudmyla Danylina	Women's 1500m T20				
Nataliia Kobzar	Women's 200m T37				
Nataliia Kobzar	Women's 400m T37				
Yuliia Shuliar	Women's 400m T20				

Women's field

Athlete	Event	Final		
Athlete	Event	Result	Points	Rank
Iana Lebiedieva	Women's discus throw F53			
Anastasiia Moskalenko	Women's club throw F32			
Anastasiia Moskalenko	Women's shot put F32			
Anastasiia Mysnyk	Women's shot put F20			
Zoia Ovsii	Women's club throw F51			
Zoia Ovsii	Women's discus throw F53			
Yuliia Pavlenko	Women's long jump T11			
Mariia Pomazan	Women's shot put F35			
Viktoriia Shpachynska	Women's shot put F20			
Oksana Zubkovska	Women's long jump T12			

== Badminton ==
Athlete	Event	Group Stage			Semifinal	Final / BM	
Athlete	Event	Opposition Score	Opposition Score	Rank	Opposition Score	Opposition Score	Rank
Oleksandr Chyrkov	Men's singles SL3	Bhagat (IND); L (12–21, 9–21)	Sarkar (IND); L (16–21, 9–21)	3	Did not advance		

== Cycling ==
Ukraine competed in cycling at the 2020 Summer Paralympics.

== Goalball ==
=== Men ===
The following is the Ukraine roster in the men's goalball tournament of the 2020 Summer Paralympics.

No.	Player	Class	Date of birth (age)
1	Vasyl Oliinyk	B2	10 January 1996 (aged 25)
2	Anton Strelchyk	B3	4 March 1992 (aged 29)
3	Vitalii Haponenko	B2	17 December 1994 (aged 26)
4	Yevheniy Tsyhanenko	B3	10 December 1990 (aged 30)
5	Rodion Zhyhalin	B2	21 May 1985 (aged 36)
7	Oleksandr Toporkov	B2	31 May 1991 (aged 30)

Group stage

Pos	Team	Pld	W	D	L	GF	GA	GD	Pts	Qualification
1	Belgium	4	2	0	2	18	13	+5	6	Quarter-finals
2	Ukraine	4	2	0	2	18	15	+3	6	Quarter-finals
3	Turkey	4	2	0	2	15	15	0	6	Quarter-finals
4	China	4	2	0	2	21	22	−1	6	Quarter-finals
5	Germany	4	2	0	2	16	23	−7	6	

Source: TOCOG

26 August 2021; 17:30	Ukraine	11–5	Germany	Makuhari Messe, Tokyo; Referees: Yoshinori Nii (Japan), Vaida Pokvytytė (Lithuania)
26 August 2021; 17:30	Zhyhalin 7 Oliinyk 4	Report	Dennis 3 Rogge 2	Makuhari Messe, Tokyo; Referees: Yoshinori Nii (Japan), Vaida Pokvytytė (Lithuania)

27 August 2021; 17:30	China	7–3	Ukraine	Makuhari Messe, Tokyo; Referees: Romualdas Vaitiekus (Lithuania), Warrick Jackes (Australia)
27 August 2021; 17:30	Chen Liangliang 3 Cai Changgui 2 Yang Mingyuan 2	Report	Zhyhalin 2 Oliinyk 1	Makuhari Messe, Tokyo; Referees: Romualdas Vaitiekus (Lithuania), Warrick Jackes (Australia)

29 August 2021; 13:15	Belgium	2–4	Ukraine	Makuhari Messe, Tokyo; Referees: Yoshinori Nii (Japan), Robert Avery (Great Britain)
29 August 2021; 13:15	Mapreni 2	Report	Oliinyk 2 Zhyhalin 2	Makuhari Messe, Tokyo; Referees: Yoshinori Nii (Japan), Robert Avery (Great Britain)

30 August 2021; 09:00	Ukraine	0–1	Turkey	Makuhari Messe, Tokyo; Referees: Warrick Jackes (Australia), Yoshinori Nii (Japan)
30 August 2021; 09:00		Report	Karakaya 1	Makuhari Messe, Tokyo; Referees: Warrick Jackes (Australia), Yoshinori Nii (Japan)

Quarter-finals

31 August 2021; 15:00	Ukraine	4–5	United States	Makuhari Messe, Tokyo; Referees: Warrick Jackes (Australia), Vaida Pokvytytė (LTU)
31 August 2021; 15:00	Oliinyk 3 Zhyhalin 1	Report	Young 4 Simpson 1	Makuhari Messe, Tokyo; Referees: Warrick Jackes (Australia), Vaida Pokvytytė (LTU)

== Rowing ==
Ukraine qualified four boats in all events into the Paralympic regatta. They are qualify after successfully entering the top eight at the 2019 World Rowing Championships in Ottensheim, Austria.

Athlete	Event	Heats		Repechage		Final	
Athlete	Event	Time	Rank	Time	Rank	Time	Rank
Roman Polianskyi	Men's single sculls	9:56.47	1 FA	Bye		9:48.78	1st place, gold medalist(s)
Anna Sheremet	Women's single sculls	11:39.70	1 FA	Bye		11:48.10	4
Svitlana Bohuslavska; Iaroslav Koiuda	Mixed double sculls	8:49.68	2 R	8:17.99	1 FA	8:54.97	4
Olexandra Polianska; Dariia Kotyk; Dmytro Herez; Stanislav Samoliuk; Yuliia Malasai	Mixed coxed four	7:48.95	5 R	7:13.95	3 FB	7:45.23	9

Qualification Legend: FA=Final A (medal); FB=Final B (non-medal); R=Repechage

== Shooting ==
The following athletes qualified for the 2020 Summer Paralympics after their results at the 2018 World Shooting Para Sport Championships:

- Iryna Liakhu
- Oleksii Denysiuk
- Andrii Doroshenko
- Iryna Shchetnik
- Vitali Plakushchyi
- Yurii Stoiev
- Vasyl Kovalchuk

== Swimming ==
Ukraine qualified 40 athletes.

== Table tennis ==
Ukraine entered eight athletes into the table tennis competition at the games. Viktor Didukh qualified from 2019 ITTF European Para Championships which was held in Helsingborg, Sweden and seven other via World Ranking allocation.

Men

Athlete	Event	Group Stage			Round 1	Quarterfinals	Semifinals	Final	
Athlete	Event	Opposition Result	Opposition Result	Rank	Opposition Result	Opposition Result	Opposition Result	Opposition Result	Rank
Oleksandr Yezyk	Individual C2								
Vasyl Petruniv	Individual C3								
Viktor Didukh	Individual C8								
Ivan Mai	Individual C8								
Maksym Nikolenko	Individual C8								
Lev Kats	Individual C9								

Women

Athlete	Event	Group Stage			Round 1	Quarterfinals	Semifinals	Final	
Athlete	Event	Opposition Result	Opposition Result	Rank	Opposition Result	Opposition Result	Opposition Result	Opposition Result	Rank
Maryna Lytovchenko	Individual C6								
Natalia Kosmina	Individual C11								

== Taekwondo ==
Para taekwondo makes its debut appearance in the Paralympic programme. Anton Shvets, Viktoriia Marchuk, & Yuliya Lypetska, qualified for the 2020 Summer Paralympics via World Ranking.

Men

Athlete	Event	First round	Quarterfinals	Semifinals	Repechage 1	Repechage 2	Final / BM	
Athlete	Event	Opposition Result	Opposition Result	Opposition Result	Opposition Result	Opposition Result	Opposition Result	Rank
Anton Shvets	Men's –75 kg	Samorano (ARG); L 50–52	Did not advance		Abuzarli (AZE); L 36–60	Did not advance		

Women

Athlete	Event	First round	Quarterfinals	Semifinals	Repechage 1	Repechage 2	Final / BM	
Athlete	Event	Opposition Result	Opposition Result	Opposition Result	Opposition Result	Opposition Result	Opposition Result	Rank
Viktoriia Marchuk	Women's –49 kg	Bye	Poddubskaia (RPC); L 34–63	Did not advance	Khudadadi (AFG); W 48–34	Fataliyeva (AZE); W 26–20	Poddubskaia (RPC); L 46–11	4
Yuliya Lypetska	Women's +58 kg	Mammadova (AZE)						

== See also ==
- Ukraine at the Paralympics
- Ukraine at the 2020 Summer Olympics
