= Edgaras Matakas =

Lithuanian Paralympic swimmer

Personal information
- Born: 23 October 1998 (age 27) Kaunas, Lithuania

Sport
- Country: Lithuania
- Sport: Paralympic swimming
- Disability class: S11
- Club: Kaunas Swimming School
- Coached by: Ramūnas Leonas
Medal record
Paralympic swimming
Representing Lithuania
Paralympic Games
Bronze medal – third place	2020 Tokyo	50m freestyle S11
World Championships
Gold medal – first place	2017 Mexico City	50m freestyle S11
Silver medal – second place	2022 Madeira	50m freestyle S11
Bronze medal – third place	2017 Mexico City	100m freestyle S11
Bronze medal – third place	2022 Madeira	100m breaststroke SB11
European Championships
Gold medal – first place	2020 Funchal	50m freestyle S11
Gold medal – first place	2020 Funchal	100m freestyle S11
Gold medal – first place	2020 Funchal	100m breaststroke SB11
Bronze medal – third place	2026 Kocaeli	50m freestyle S11

Edgaras Matakas (born 23 October 1998) is a Lithuanian Paralympic swimmer. He won bronze in the 50-metre freestyle S11 in 2020.

Matakas became Lithuania's first Paralympic swimmer to win a world title with the 2020 50m freestyle S11 bronze, he also won a bronze medal in the 100m freestyle S11 at the same championships. He is also a triple European champion at the 2020 World Para Swimming European Championships in Funchal.
