= Illia Yaremenko =

Ukrainian Paralympic swimmer

Personal information
- Nationality: Ukrainian
- Born: 14 July 1997 (age 29) Kyiv, Ukraine

Sport
- Sport: Para swimming
- Disability class: S12
Medal record
Men's para swimming
Representing Ukraine
Paralympic Games
Silver medal – second place	2020 Tokyo	50 m freestyle S13
Silver medal – second place	2024 Paris	50 m freestyle S13
Bronze medal – third place	2016 Rio de Janeiro	50 m freestyle S12
World Championships
Gold medal – first place	2019 London	50 m freestyle S12
Gold medal – first place	2025 Singapore	50 m freestyle S12
Silver medal – second place	2022 Madeira	50 m freestyle S12
Silver medal – second place	2023 Manchester	50 m freestyle S12
Bronze medal – third place	2022 Madeira	100 m butterfly S12
European Championships
Gold medal – first place	2018 Dublin	50 m freestyle S12
Gold medal – first place	2020 Funchal	50 m freestyle S12
Bronze medal – third place	2026 Kocaeli	50 m freestyle S12

Illia Yaremenko, Ілля Сергійович Яременко (born 14 July 1997) is a Ukrainian Paralympic swimmer. He represented Ukraine at the 2016, 2020 and 2024 Summer Paralympics.

== Career ==
Yaremenko represented Ukraine in the men's 50 metre freestyle S12 event at the 2016 Paralympic Games and won a bronze medal. He again represented Ukraine in the men's 50 metre freestyle S12 event at the 2020 Paralympic Games and won a silver medal.
