= Nicolas-Guy Turbide =

Canadian Paralympic swimmer

Personal information
- Born: January 12, 1997 (age 29) Quebec City, Quebec, Canada
- Height: 186 cm (6 ft 1 in)

Sport
- Country: Canada
- Sport: Paralympic swimming
- Disability: Oculocutaneous albinism
- Disability class: S13
- Club: Club de Natation Region de Quebec
- Coached by: Marc-André Pelletier
Medal record
Paralympic swimming
Representing Canada
Paralympic Games
Silver medal – second place	2020 Tokyo	100 m backstroke S13
Bronze medal – third place	2016 Rio de Janeiro	100 m backstroke S13
World Championships
Gold medal – first place	2022 Madeira	100 m backstroke S13
Silver medal – second place	2019 London	100 m backstroke S13
Bronze medal – third place	2023 Manchester	50 m freestyle S13
Commonwealth Games
Gold medal – first place	2022 Birmingham	50 m freestyle S13
Parapan American Games
Gold medal – first place	2015 Toronto	100 m backstroke S13
Gold medal – first place	2015 Toronto	100 m butterfly S13
Gold medal – first place	2015 Toronto	200 m individual medley SM13
Silver medal – second place	2015 Toronto	50 m freestyle S13
Silver medal – second place	2015 Toronto	100 m freestyle S13
Silver medal – second place	2015 Toronto	400 m freestyle S13

Nicolas-Guy Turbide (born January 12, 1997) is a Canadian Paralympic swimmer who has albinism. He is a two-time Paralympic medallist, a Commonwealth Games champion, a triple Parapan American Games champion and a World silver medallist in the 100m backstroke.

== Career ==
Turbide was named Male Para Swimmer of the Year by Swimming Canada in 2016 and 2018 and was named co-winner in 2019. He was awarded the Medal of the National Assembly by the National Assembly of Quebec in 2016.

Named to the Canadian team for the 2022 Commonwealth Games, Turbide won gold in the 50 m freestyle S13 on the second day of competition, setting a new Games and Canadian record of 24.32 seconds. He said he "executed the race plan exactly the way I wanted to."
