= Muzaffar Tursunkhujaev =

Uzbekistani Paralympic swimmer (born 1998)

Personal information
- Born: 16 January 1998 (age 28)

Sport
- Country: Uzbekistan
- Sport: Paralympic swimming
- Disability: Vision impairment
- Disability class: S13
Medal record
Paralympic swimming
Representing Uzbekistan
Paralympic Games
Bronze medal – third place	2016 Rio de Janeiro	50 m freestyle S13
Bronze medal – third place	2016 Rio de Janeiro	100 m butterfly S13
World Championships
Silver medal – second place	2022 Madeira	100 m freestyle S13
Bronze medal – third place	2019 London	50 m freestyle S13
Asian Para Games
Gold medal – first place	2022 Hangzhou	100 m butterfly S13
Silver medal – second place	2018 Jakarta	50 m freestyle S13
Silver medal – second place	2018 Jakarta	100 m freestyle S13
Silver medal – second place	2018 Jakarta	100 m backstroke S13
Silver medal – second place	2022 Hangzhou	50 m freestyle S13
Silver medal – second place	2022 Hangzhou	100 m backstroke S13

Muzaffar Tursunkhujaev (born 16 January 1998) is a visually impaired Uzbekistani Paralympic swimmer. He is a two-time bronze medalist at the 2016 Summer Paralympics held in Rio de Janeiro, Brazil.

== Career ==
He represented Uzbekistan at the 2016 Summer Paralympics in Rio de Janeiro, Brazil and he won two bronze medals: in the men's 50 metre freestyle S13 and men's 100 metre butterfly S13 events. He also competed at the 2020 Summer Paralympics held in Tokyo, Japan.

At the 2019 World Para Swimming Championships held in London, United Kingdom, he won the bronze medal in the men's 50 metres freestyle S13 event.
