= Islam Aslanov =

Uzbekistani Paralympic swimmer

Personal information
- Born: 1993 or 1994 (age 32–33)

Sport
- Country: Uzbekistan
- Sport: Para swimming
- Disability class: S13
Medal record
Men's para swimming
Representing Uzbekistan
Paralympic Games
Bronze medal – third place	2020 Tokyo	100 m butterfly S13
World Championships
Silver medal – second place	2019 London	50 m freestyle S13
Silver medal – second place	2019 London	100 m freestyle S13
Silver medal – second place	2019 London	100 m butterfly S13
Silver medal – second place	2023 Manchester	100 m freestyle S13
Silver medal – second place	2023 Manchester	50 m freestyle S13
Bronze medal – third place	2022 Madeira	100 m butterfly S13
Bronze medal – third place	2022 Madeira	50 m freestyle S13
Asian Para Games
Gold medal – first place	2018 Jakarta	50 m freestyle S13
Gold medal – first place	2018 Jakarta	100 m freestyle S13
Gold medal – first place	2018 Jakarta	100 m butterfly S13
Silver medal – second place	2018 Jakarta	400 m freestyle S13
Bronze medal – third place	2018 Jakarta	100 m breaststroke S13
Silver medal – second place	2022 Hangzhou	100 m butterfly S13
Men's swimming
Representing Uzbekistan
Asian Games
Bronze medal – third place	2014 Incheon	4×100 m medley

Islam Aslanov is an Uzbekistani Paralympic swimmer. He won the bronze medal in the men's 100 metre butterfly S13 event at the 2020 Summer Paralympics held in Tokyo, Japan.

== Career ==
In 2018, Aslanov won three gold medals, one silver medal and one bronze medal at the Asian Para Games held in Jakarta, Indonesia.

Aslanov won the bronze medal in the men's 4 × 100 metre medley relay at the 2014 Asian Games held in Incheon, South Korea. He also competed in two individual events: the men's 50 metre butterfly and men's 100 metre butterfly events. In the men's 4 × 100 metre freestyle relay he finished in 5th place in the final.

In 2019, Aslanov won the silver medal in the men's 50 metre freestyle S13 event at the World Para Swimming Championships held in London, United Kingdom. He also won the silver medal in both the men's 100 metre freestyle S13 event and men's 100 metre butterfly S13 event.
