= Oleksii Virchenko =

Ukrainian Paralympic swimmer

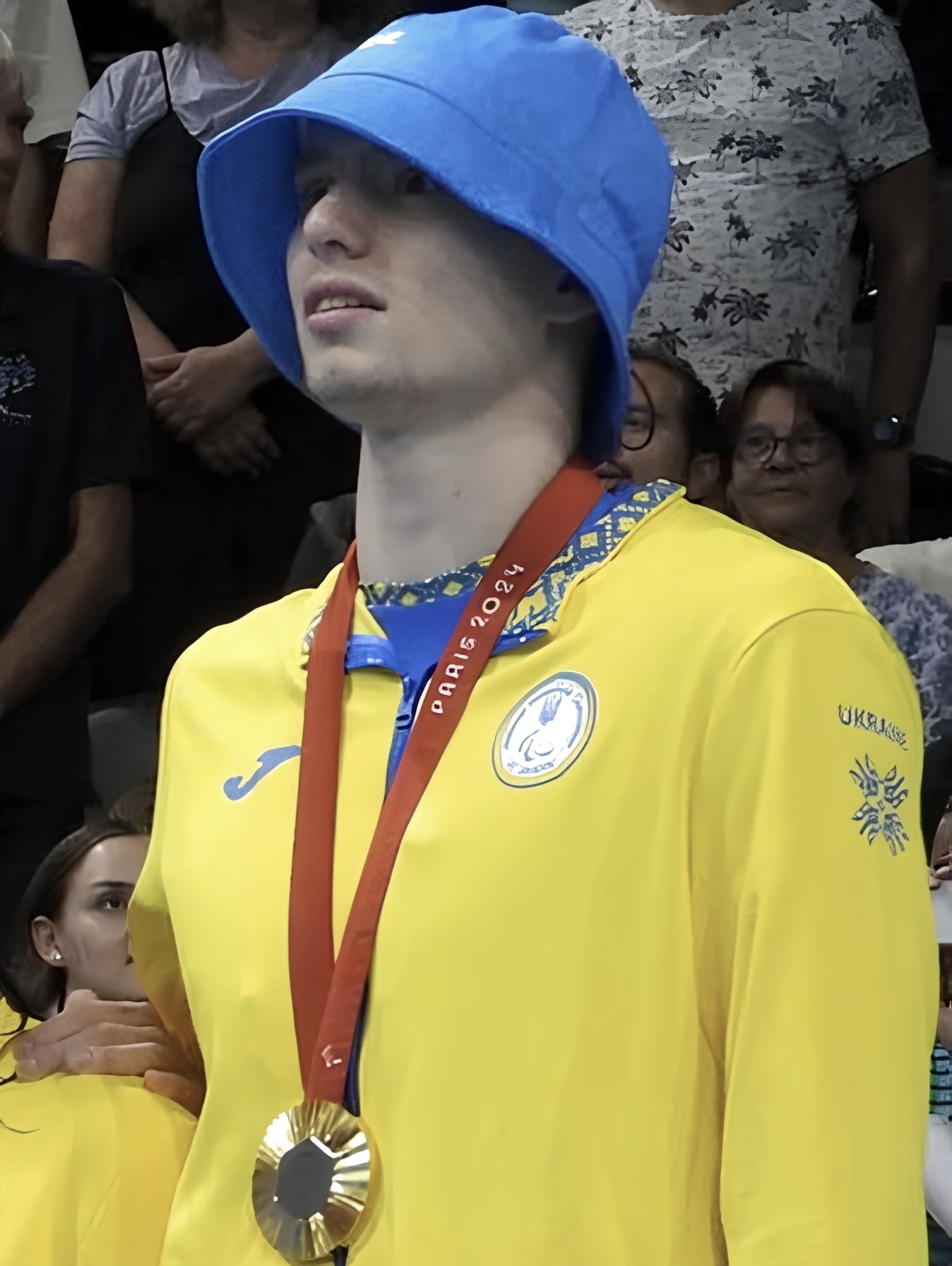
- Virchenko at the 2024 Summer Paralympics

Personal information
- Nationality: Ukraine
- Born: 30 March 2001 (age 25) Poltava, Ukraine

Sport
- Sport: Paralympic swimming
- Disability class: S13
Medal record
Men's para swimming
Representing Ukraine
Paralympic Games
Gold medal – first place	2024 Paris	Mixed 4×100 m freestyle relay 49pts
Silver medal – second place	2020 Tokyo	100 m butterfly S13
Bronze medal – third place	2024 Paris	50 m freestyle S13
World Championships
Gold medal – first place	2022 Madeira	100 m butterfly S13
Gold medal – first place	2022 Madeira	50 m freestyle S13
Gold medal – first place	2023 Manchester	100 m butterfly S13
Gold medal – first place	2023 Manchester	50 m freestyle S13
Gold medal – first place	2025 Singapore	50 m freestyle S13
Silver medal – second place	2025 Singapore	100 m butterfly S13
Bronze medal – third place	2019 London	100 m backstroke S13
Bronze medal – third place	2019 London	100 m butterfly S13
Bronze medal – third place	2022 Madeira	100 m backstroke S13
Bronze medal – third place	2023 Manchester	100 m freestyle S13
Bronze medal – third place	2023 Manchester	100 m backstroke S13
Bronze medal – third place	2025 Singapore	100 m backstroke S13
European Championships
Gold medal – first place	2026 Kocaeli	100 m butterfly S13
Silver medal – second place	2020 Funchal	50 m freestyle S13
Silver medal – second place	2020 Funchal	100 m butterfly S13
Silver medal – second place	2024 Madeira	100 m freestyle S13
Silver medal – second place	2024 Madeira	50 m freestyle S13
Silver medal – second place	2026 Kocaeli	100 m backstroke S13
Bronze medal – third place	2020 Funchal	100 m freestyle S13
Bronze medal – third place	2024 Madeira	100 m butterfly S13

Oleksii Virchenko (born 30 March 2001) is a Ukrainian Paralympic swimmer. He represented Ukraine at the 2020 and 2024 Summer Paralympics.

== Career ==
Virchenko represented Ukraine in the men's 100 metre butterfly S13 event at the 2020 Summer Paralympics and won a silver medal.
