= Refugee Paralympic Team =

Refugee Paralympic Team at the Paralympics
- Flag of the International Paralympic Committee
- IPC code: RPT
- NPC: Refugee Paralympic Team
- Medals: Gold 0 Silver 0 Bronze 2 Total 2

Summer appearances
- 2020; 2024

Other related appearances
- Individual Paralympic Athletes (2016)

The Refugee Paralympic Team (RPT) is a group made up of independent Paralympic participants who are refugees. The team competes using the Paralympic flag and Paralympic anthem, and marches first during the Opening Ceremony.

Alongside the debut of the Refugee Olympic Team at the 2016 Summer Olympics, a team of refugee Para athletes first competed at the Rio 2016 Summer Paralympics as Independent Paralympic Athletes. The Refugee Paralympic Team was formally named starting with the 2020 Summer Paralympics.

Zakia Khudadadi became the first person to win a Paralympic medal for the Refugee Paralympic Team, winning a bronze medal in the women's –47 kg Para taekwondo event at the Paris 2024 Summer Paralympics. Days later, Guillaume Junior Atangana, guided by fellow refugee Donard Ndim Nyamjua, won bronze in the men's 400m T11 Para athletics event.

== Medalists ==
Medal	Name	Games	Sport	Event
Bronze	Zakia Khudadadi	2024 Paris	Para taekwando	Women's –47 kg
Bronze	Guillaume Junior Atangana	2024 Paris	Athletics	Men's 400 m T11

=== Medals by Summer sport ===
Sport	Gold	Silver	Bronze	Total
Athletics	0	0	1	1
Taekwondo	0	0	1	1
Totals (2 entries)	0	0	2	2

== Participations ==
=== 2016 Summer Paralympics ===
The team was announced on August 5, 2016, by the International Paralympic Committee. Participants were nominated for the team by National Paralympic Committees who were aware of qualified sportspeople. The International Paralympic Committee stepped in to assist with getting athletes ready by doing a number of things, including insuring that athletes were classified.

Athlete	Country of origin	Host NPC	Sport	Event
Shahrad Nasajpour	Iran	USA	Para athletics	Men's Discus F37
Ibrahim Al Hussein	Syria	Greece	Para swimming	Men's 50m freestyle S9; Men's 100m freestyle S9

=== 2020 Summer Paralympics ===
Athlete	Country of origin	Host NPC	Sport	Event
Shahrad Nasajpour	Iran	United States	Para athletics	Men's Discus F37
Alia Issa	Syria	Greece	Para athletics	Women's Club throw F32
Anas Al Khalifa	Syria	Germany	Para canoe	Men's Va'a Single 200m - KL2; Men's Va'a Single 200m - VL2
Abbas Karimi	Afghanistan	United States	Para swimming	Men's 50m backstroke S5; Men's 50m backstroke S5
Ibrahim Al Hussein	Syria	Greece	Para swimming	Men's 50m freestyle S9; Men's 100m breaststroke SB8
Parfait Hakizimana	Burundi	Rwanda	Para taekwondo	Men's K44 -61 kg

=== 2024 Summer Paralympics ===
The team for the Paris 2024 Paralympic Games was the largest to date for the Paralympic Games and was announced on 9 July 2024. The eight athletes and one guide runner competed across six sports. The team was led by Chef de Mission Nyasha Mharakurwa PLY, who represented Zimbabwe in wheelchair tennis at London 2012. The team was supported by Worldwide Paralympic Partner Airbnb, Asics, UNHCR (the UN Refugee Agency), the French Ministry for Sport and Olympic and Paralympic Games, the Paris 2024 Organising Committee, and Centre for Resources, Expertise and Sport Performance of Reims.

Athlete	Country of origin	Host NPC	Sport	Event
Guillaume Junior Atangana	Cameroon	Great Britain	Para athletics	Men's 100m T11 Men's 400m T11
Salman Abbariki	Iran	Germany	Para athletics	Men's Shot Put F34
Sayed Amir Hossein Pour	Iran	Germany	Para table tennis	Men's individual C8
Hadi Hassanzada	Afghanistan	Austria	Para taekwando	Men's -80kg
Zakia Khudadadi	Afghanistan	France	Para taekwando	Women's –47 kg
Hadi Darvish	Iran	Germany	Para powerlifting	Men's –80 kg
Ibrahim Al Hussein	Syria	Greece	Para triathlon	Men's PTS3
Amelio Castro Grueso	Colombia	Italy	Wheelchair fencing	Men's épée B Men's sabre B

== See also ==
- EOC Refugee Team at the 2023 European Games
- Refugee Olympic Team
