= Swimming at the 2016 Summer Paralympics – Men's 100 metre freestyle S9 =

Men's 100 metre freestyle S9

Men's 100 metre freestyle S9 at the XV Paralympic Games
- Venue: Olympic Aquatics Stadium
- Dates: 12 September 2016
- Competitors: 21 from 14 nations

Medalists
1st place, gold medalist(s)		Timothy Disken	Australia
2nd place, silver medalist(s)		Brenden Hall	Australia
3rd place, bronze medalist(s)		Tamás Tóth	Hungary

The Men's 100 metre freestyle S9 event at the 2016 Paralympic Games took place on 12 September 2016, at the Olympic Aquatics Stadium. No heats were held, however, the swimmers with the eight fastest times advanced to the final.

== Heats ==
=== Heat 1 ===
10:58 12 September 2016:

Rank	Lane	Name	Nationality	Time	Notes
1	4	Brenden Hall	Australia	57.14	Q
2	3	David Grachat	Portugal	57.90	
3	5	Vanilton Filho	Brazil	58.51	
4	6	Ryan Crouch	Great Britain	58.65	
5	2	Timothy Hodge	Australia	58.85	
6	7	Lucas Mozela	Brazil	1:00.46	
7	1	Ibrahim Al Hussein	Individual Paralympic Athletes	1:20.98	

=== Heat 2 ===
11:02 12 September 2016:

Rank	Lane	Name	Nationality	Time	Notes
1	3	Tamás Tóth	Hungary	57.14	Q
2	6	Ruiter Silva	Brazil	57.39	Q
3	4	Federico Morlacchi	Italy	57.75	Q
4	5	Lewis White	Great Britain	58.51	
5	2	Leo Lahteenmaki	Finland	59.08	
6	7	Ilija Tadic	Montenegro	59.91	
7	1	Scody Victor	Mauritius	1:15.15	

=== Heat 3 ===
11:05 12 September 2016:

Rank	Lane	Name	Nationality	Time	Notes
1	4	Timothy Disken	Australia	56.73	Q
2	5	Jose Antonio Mari Alcaraz	Spain	57.17	Q
3	7	Tamás Sors	Hungary	57.79	Q
4	3	Takuro Yamada	Japan	57.84	Q
5	2	Kristijan Vincetic	Croatia	58.53	
6	6	Matthew Wylie	Great Britain	59.32	
7	1	Patryk Biskup	Poland	1:01.78	

=== Swim-off ===
12:25 12 September 2016:

Rank	Lane	Name	Nationality	Time	Notes
1	4	Vanilton Filho	Brazil	58.26	
2	5	Lewis White	Great Britain	58.43	

== Final ==
19:03 12 September 2016:

Rank	Lane	Name	Nationality	Time	Notes
1st place, gold medalist(s)	4	Timothy Disken	Australia	56.23	
2nd place, silver medalist(s)	5	Brenden Hall	Australia	56.95	
3rd place, bronze medalist(s)	3	Tamás Tóth	Hungary	57.20	
4	7	Federico Morlacchi	Italy	57.28	
5	2	Ruiter Silva	Brazil	57.44	
6	1	Tamás Sors	Hungary	57.49	
7	6	Jose Antonio Mari Alcaraz	Spain	57.62	
8	8	Takuro Yamada	Japan	57.69	
