= Swimming at the 2020 Summer Paralympics – Men's 100 metre breaststroke SB8 =

Men's 100 metre breaststroke SB8 at the XVI Paralympic Games
- Venue: Tokyo Aquatics Centre
- Dates: 26 August 2021
- Competitors: 15 from 12 nations

Medalists
1st place, gold medalist(s)		Andrei Kalina	RPC
2nd place, silver medalist(s)		Oscar Salguero Galisteo	Spain
3rd place, bronze medalist(s)		Yang Guanglong	China

The Men's 100 metre breaststroke SB8 event at the 2020 Paralympic Games took place on 26 August 2021, at the Tokyo Aquatics Centre.

== Heats ==
The swimmers with the top 8 times, regardless of heat, advanced to the final.

Rank	Heat	Lane	Name	Nationality	Time	Notes
1	2	4	Andrei Kalina	RPC	1:08.46	Q
2	1	4	Oscar Salguero Galisteo	Spain	1:10.19	Q
3	2	5	Tim van Duuren	Netherlands	1:10.36	Q
4	1	3	Daniil Smirnov	RPC	1:10.86	Q
5	2	6	Xu Haijiao	China	1:11.92	Q
6	1	6	Yang Guanglong	China	1:12.07	Q
7	1	5	Vicente Enrique Almonacid Heyl	Chile	1:12.11	Q
8	2	3	Timothy Disken	Australia	1:12.16	Q
9	2	2	Federico Morlacchi	Italy	1:13.24	
10	1	1	Diogo Cancela	Portugal	1:13.90	
11	1	2	Andreas Onea	Austria	1:17.26	
12	1	7	Carlos Martínez Fernández	Spain	1:19.30	
	2	1	Takuro Yamada	Japan	DNS	
	2	7	Robin Liksor	Estonia	DNS	
	2	8	Ibrahim Al Hussein	Refugee Paralympic Team	DSQ	

== Final ==
100m breaststroke final
Rank	Lane	Name	Nationality	Time	Notes
1st place, gold medalist(s)	4	Andrei Kalina	RPC	1:07.24	
2nd place, silver medalist(s)	5	Oscar Salguero Galisteo	Spain	1:09.91	
3rd place, bronze medalist(s)	7	Yang Guanglong	China	1:10.48	
4	3	Tim van Duuren	Netherlands	1:10.55	
5	6	Daniil Smirnov	RPC	1:11.45	
6	2	Xu Haijiao	China	1:11.55	
7	8	Timothy Disken	Australia	1:11.81	
8	1	Vicente Enrique Almonacid Heyl	Chile	1:12.69	
