= Swimming at the 2020 Summer Paralympics – Men's 50 metre freestyle S9 =

Men's 50 metre freestyle S9 at the XVI Paralympic Games
- Venue: Tokyo Aquatics Centre
- Dates: 29 August 2021
- Competitors: 25 from 16 nations

Medalists
1st place, gold medalist(s)		Simone Barlaam	Italy
2nd place, silver medalist(s)		Denis Tarasov	RPC
3rd place, bronze medalist(s)		Jamal Hill	United States

The men's 50 metre freestyle S9 event at the 2020 Paralympic Games took place on 29 August 2021, at the Tokyo Aquatics Centre.

== Heats ==
50m freestyle heats
Rank	Heat	Lane	Name	Nationality	Time	Notes
1	4	4	Simone Barlaam	Italy	25.13	Q, =PR
2	3	4	Denis Tarasov	RPC	25.37	Q
3	4	5	William Martin	Australia	25.40	Q
4	2	4	Jamal Hill	United States	25.56	Q
5	2	5	Fredrik Solberg	Norway	25.67	Q
6	3	5	Bogdan Mozgovoi	RPC	25.86	Q
7	4	3	Timothy Disken	Australia	26.11	Q
8	4	6	Yahor Shchalkanau	Belarus	26.34	Q
9	2	3	Simone Ciulli	Italy	26.39	
10	2	6	Jose Antonio Mari Alcaraz	Spain	26.42	
11	4	2	Takuro Yamada	Japan	26.46	
12	2	7	Yurii Bozhynskyi	Ukraine	26.58	
13	3	2	Alexander Skaliukh	RPC	26.60	
14	3	6	Leo Lahteenmaki	Finland	26.64	
15	2	2	Malte Braunschweig	Germany	26.69	
16	3	3	Ruiter Silva	Brazil	26.70	
17	3	1	Ilija Tadic	Montenegro	26.86	
18	3	7	Vanilton Filho	Brazil	26.99	
19	4	7	Gabriel Silva de Sousa	Brazil	27.29	
20	4	1	Alexander Tuckfield	Australia	27.32	
21	2	1	Oscar Salguero Galisteo	Spain	28.11	
22	1	4	Rodrigo Hermosa	Paraguay	29.72	
23	4	8	Ibrahim Al Hussein	Refugee Paralympic Team	30.27	
24	1	5	Antwahn Boyce-Vaughan	Barbados	37.86	
25	1	3	Dexroy Creese	Saint Vincent and the Grenadines	41.44	

== Final ==
50m freestyle final
Rank	Lane	Name	Nationality	Time	Notes
1st place, gold medalist(s)	4	Simone Barlaam	Italy	24.71	PR
2nd place, silver medalist(s)	5	Denis Tarasov	RPC	24.99	
3rd place, bronze medalist(s)	6	Jamal Hill	United States	25.19	AM
4	3	William Martin	Australia	25.34	
5	2	Fredrik Solberg	Norway	25.53	
6	7	Bogdan Mozgovoi	RPC	25.56	
7	1	Timothy Disken	Australia	25.71	
8	8	Yahor Shchalkanau	Belarus	25.96	
