= Refugee Paralympic Team at the 2024 Summer Paralympics =

- Flag of the International Paralympic Committee
- IPC code: RPT
- NPC: Refugee Paralympic Team

in Paris, France
- Competitors: 8 in 6 sports
- Flag bearer: Guillaume Junior Atangana
- Medals Ranked 78th: Gold 0 Silver 0 Bronze 2 Total 2

Summer Paralympics appearances (overview)
- 2020; 2024

Other related appearances
- Individual Paralympic Athletes (2016)

The Refugee Paralympic Team competed at the 2024 Summer Paralympics in Paris, France, from 28 August to 8 September 2024. The team consisted of eight athletes and one guide runner, all refugees and asylees who represented more than 120 million forcibly displaced people worldwide. The formation of the team and its six athletes was announced on 9 July 2024 in a joint statement by the IPC and UNHCR. The team had made its debut at the 2016 Paralympics as the Independent Paralympic Athletes Team, which consisted of just two athletes, and returned to the 2020 Summer Paralympics under the current name with six refugee and asylee Paralympic athletes.

== Medalists ==
The following Refugee competitors won medals at the games. In the discipline sections below, the medalists' names are bolded.

Medal	Name	Sport	Event	Date
Bronze	Zakia Khudadadi	Taekwondo	Women's –47 kg	29 August
Bronze	Guillaume Junior Atangana	Athletics	Men's 400 m T11	2 September

Medals by sport
Sport	1st place, gold medalist(s)	2nd place, silver medalist(s)	3rd place, bronze medalist(s)	Total
Athletics	0	0	1	**1**
Taekwondo	0	0	1	**1**
Total	0	0	2	2

Medals by day
Day	Date	1st place, gold medalist(s)	2nd place, silver medalist(s)	3rd place, bronze medalist(s)	Total
1	29 August	0	0	1	**1**
2	30 August	0	0	0	**0**
3	31 August	0	0	0	**0**
4	1 September	0	0	0	**0**
5	2 September	0	0	1	**1**
Total		0	0	2	2

Medals by gender
Gender	1st place, gold medalist(s)	2nd place, silver medalist(s)	3rd place, bronze medalist(s)	Total	Percentage
Male	0	0	1	**1**	50.0%
Female	0	0	1	**1**	50.0%
Total	0	0	2	1	

== Competitors ==
Zimbabwe-born parathlete Nyasha Mharakurwa was chosen as the chef de mission of the Refugee Paralympic Team.

Athlete	Country of origin	Host NPC	Sport	Event
Guillaume Junior Atangana	Cameroon	Great Britain	Para athletics	Men's 100 m T11
Guillaume Junior Atangana	Cameroon	Great Britain	Para athletics	Men's 400 m T11
Salman Abbariki	Iran	Germany	Para athletics	Men's shot put F34
Sayed Amir Hossein Pour	Iran	Germany	Para table tennis	Men's individual C8
Hadi Hassanzada	Afghanistan	Austria	Parataekwondo	Men's –80 kg
Zakia Khudadadi	Afghanistan	France	Parataekwondo	Women's –47 kg
Hadi Darvish	Iran	Germany	Powerlifting	Men's 80 kg
Ibrahim Al Hussein	Syria	Greece	Paratriathlon	Men's PTS3
Amelio Castro Grueso	Colombia	Italy	Wheelchair fencing	Men's épée B
Amelio Castro Grueso	Colombia	Italy	Wheelchair fencing	Men's sabre B

Guillaume Junior Atangana, who is vision-impaired, will line up alongside his guide and fellow refugee Donard Ndim Nyamjua. Khudadadi, Atangana, Hussein and Abbariki all competed in prior Paralympics.

== Sponsorship ==
The Refugee Team was sponsored or supported by Airbnb, Asics, UNHCR, the French Ministry for Sport and Olympic and Paralympic Games, the Paris 2024 Organizing Committee and CREPS of Reims.

== Athletics ==
Key

- Note–Ranks given for track events are within the athlete's heat only
- **Q** = Qualified for the next round
- **q** = Qualified for the next round as a fastest loser or, in field events, by position without achieving the qualifying target
- **DQ** = Disqualified
- **PR** = Paralympic Record
- **AR** = Area (or continental) Record
- **NR** = National Record
- **SB** = Season's Best
- N/A = Round not applicable for the event
- Bye = Athlete not required to compete in round

Field event
Men

Athlete	Event	Final	
Athlete	Event	Result	Rank
Salman Abbariki	Men's shot put F34	8.92	9

Track and road events
Men

Athlete	Event	Heat		Semifinal		Final	
Athlete	Event	Result	Rank	Result	Rank	Result	Rank
**Guillaume Junior Atangana**	Men's 100 m T11	11.40	2 **Q**	11.49	3	Did not advance	
**Guillaume Junior Atangana**	Men's 400 m T11	51.95	1 **Q**	51.03	1 **Q**	50.89 **PB**	3rd place, bronze medalist(s)

== Paratriathlon ==
Athlete	Class	Swim	T1	Bike				T2	Run				Time	Rank
Athlete	Class	Swim	T1	L1	L2	L3	L4	T2	L1	L2	L3	L4	Time	Rank
Ibrahim Al Hussein	Men's PTS3	11:46	1:54	11:29	12:30	13:12	12:19	0:44	4:56	5:10	6:06	6:08	1:12:34	6

== Powerlifting ==
Athlete	Event	Attempts (kg)				Result (kg)	Rank
Athlete	Event	1	2	3	4	Result (kg)	Rank
Hadi Darvish	Men's 80 kg	193	198	~~203~~	—N/a	198	6

== Table tennis ==
Athlete	Event	Round of 32	Round of 16	Quarterfinals	Semifinals	Final / BM	
Athlete	Event	Opposition Result	Opposition Result	Opposition Result	Opposition Result	Opposition Result	Rank
Seyed Hosseini Pour	Men's individual C8	Wangphonphathanasiri (THA); **L** 0–3	Did not advance				

== Taekwondo ==
Athlete	Event	Preliminary round	First round	Quarterfinals	Semifinals	Repechage	Final / BM	
Athlete	Event	Opposition Result	Opposition Result	Opposition Result	Opposition Result	Opposition Result	Opposition Result	Rank
Hadi Hassanzada	Men's –80 kg	Ganapin (PHI); **L** 13–22	Did not advance					
**Zakia Khudadadi**	Women's –47 kg	—N/a	Rodríguez (CUB); **W** 21–11	Isakova (UZB); **L** 3–4	—N/a	Ekinci (TUR); **W** 9–1	Laarif (MAR); **W** WWD	3rd place, bronze medalist(s)

== Wheelchair Fencing ==
Athlete	Event	Round of 32	Round of 16	Quarterfinals	Semifinals	Repechage 1	Repechage 2	Repechage 3	Repechage 4	Final / BM	
Athlete	Event	Opposition Result	Opposition Result	Opposition Result	Opposition Result	Opposition Result	Opposition Result	Opposition Result	Opposition Result	Opposition Result	Rank
Amelio Castro	Men's épée B	Alderete (ARG); **W** Walkover	Guissone (BRA); **L** 10–15	Did not advance		Tarjanyi (HUN); **W** 15–4	Hu (CHN); **L** 15–8	Did not advance			
Amelio Castro	Men's sabre B	—N/a	Castro (POL); **L** 3–13	Did not advance		Datsko (UKR); **W** 15–12	Tarjanyi (HUN); **L** 6–15	Did not advance			
