= Swimming at the 2018 Commonwealth Games – Men's 100 metre freestyle S9 =

Men's S9 100m Freestyle at the 2018 Commonwealth Games
- Venue: Gold Coast Aquatic Centre
- Dates: 6 April
- Competitors: 9 from 5 nations
- Winning time: 56.07

Medalists
gold medal	Timothy Disken	Australia
silver medal	Lewis White	England
bronze medal	Brendan Hall	Australia

The men's S9 100m Freestyle event at the 2018 Commonwealth Games was held on 6 April at the Gold Coast Aquatic Centre.

== Schedule ==
The schedule is as follows:

All times are Australian Eastern Standard Time (UTC+10)

Date	Time	Round
Friday 6 April 2018	11:46	Qualifying
Friday 6 April 2018	20:49	Final

== Records ==
Prior to this competition, the existing world, Commonwealth and Games records were as follows:

World record	Rowan Crothers (AUS)	54.18	Brisbane, Australia	17 December 2014
Commonwealth record				
Games record				

== Results ==
=== Heats ===
Rank	Heat	Lane	Name	Nation	Result	Notes
1	2	4	Timothy Diskens	Australia	56.59	Q
2	1	4	Lewis White	England	56.83	Q
3	2	5	Brendan Hall	Australia	57.93	Q
4	1	5	Timothy Hodge	Australia	58.76	Q
5	2	3	Chris Arbuthnott	New Zealand	58.78	Q
6	1	3	Jesse Reynolds	New Zealand	1:00.06	Q
7	2	6	Barry McClements	Northern Ireland	1:00.93	Q
8	2	2	Jacob Leach	England	1:02.50	Q
9	1	6	Phillippe Vachon	Canada	1:02.61	

=== Final ===
Rank	Lane	Name	Nation	Result	Notes
1st place, gold medalist(s)	4	Timothy Diskens	Australia	56.07	
2nd place, silver medalist(s)	5	Lewis White	England	56.77	
3rd place, bronze medalist(s)	3	Brendan Hall	Australia	57.90	
4	6	Timothy Hodge	Australia	58.11	
5	2	Chris Arbuthnott	New Zealand	58.65	
6	7	Jesse Reynolds	New Zealand	1:00.03	
7	1	Barry McClements	Northern Ireland	1:00.34	
8	8	Jacob Leach	England	1:02.04	
