= Swimming at the 2016 Summer Paralympics – Men's 400 metre freestyle S9 =

Men's 400 metre freestyle S9 at the XV Paralympic Games
- Venue: Olympic Aquatics Stadium
- Dates: 9 September 2016
- Competitors: 14 from 11 nations

Medalists
1st place, gold medalist(s)		Brenden Hall	Australia
2nd place, silver medalist(s)		Federico Morlacchi	Italy
3rd place, bronze medalist(s)		Lewis White	Great Britain

The Men's 400 metre freestyle S9 event at the 2016 Paralympic Games took place on 9 September 2016, at the Olympic Aquatics Stadium. Two heats were held. The swimmers with the eight fastest times advanced to the final.

== Heats ==
=== Heat 1 ===
10:42 9 September 2016:

Rank	Lane	Name	Nationality	Time	Notes
1	4	Federico Morlacchi	Italy	4:22.20	Q
2	3	Lewis White	Great Britain	4:22.63	Q
3	5	David Grachat	Portugal	4:22.86	Q
4	6	Jose Antonio Mari Alcaraz	Spain	4:22.89	Q
5	2	Logan Powell	Australia	4:28.94	Q
6	7	Patryk Biskup	Poland	4:35.68	
7	1	Juan Castillo Estevez	Cuba	4:44.71	

=== Heat 2 ===
10:49 9 September 2016:

Rank	Lane	Name	Nationality	Time	Notes
1	4	Brenden Hall	Australia	4:20.46	Q
2	3	Jonathan Booth	Great Britain	4:24.86	Q
3	5	Kristijan Vincetic	Croatia	4:27.87	Q
4	2	Timothy Hodge	Australia	4:29.53	
5	6	Jesse Reynolds	New Zealand	4:35.04	
6	1	Takuro Yamada	Japan	4:37.28	
7	7	Hyun Kwon	South Korea	4:44.00	

== Final ==
19:41 9 September 2016:

Rank	Lane	Name	Nationality	Time	Notes
1st place, gold medalist(s)	4	Brenden Hall	Australia	4:12.73	
2nd place, silver medalist(s)	5	Federico Morlacchi	Italy	4:17.91	
3rd place, bronze medalist(s)	3	Lewis White	Great Britain	4:21.38	
4	2	Jose Antonio Mari Alcaraz	Spain	4:23.04	
5	7	Jonathan Booth	Great Britain	4:24.02	
6	1	Kristijan Vincetic	Croatia	4:26.28	
7	8	Logan Powell	Australia	4:27.22	
8	6	David Grachat	Portugal	4:27.73	
