= Parfait Hakizimana =

Burundian parataekwondo practitioner

Personal information
- Born: 1988 (age 37–38) Burundi

Sport
- Sport: Para Taekwondo
- Event: 61 kg
- Coached by: Zura Mushambokazi

Parfait Hakizimana (born 1988) is a Burundian parataekwondo practitioner who currently resides in Rwanda. He represented the Refugee Paralympic Team at the 2020 Summer Paralympics in the under 61 kg category.

== Life ==
Hakizimana was born in Burundi and lived in a settlement camp as a child. He was shot in the arm when he was eight in an attack that also killed his mother. His father took him to a hospital where with basic care he recovered over two years. He began learning taekwondo when he was sixteen. Hakizimana credits the sport with improving his outlook. He set up a martial arts club. When he was twenty his father died on a motorbike and he decided to leave the tribal conflict in Burundi.

He emigrated to Rwanda and lives in the Mahama Refugee Camp in Rwanda. He went on to again teach his martial art skills in the camp.

He began to compete in 2017 and he had some success. Zura Mushambokazi became his coach. She is a national Taekwondo coach. In 2021 he was able to travel to Kigali where he trained at the Amahoro Stadium.

In June 2021, Hakizimana was chosen with four men and a woman to represent refugees at the 2020 Summer Paralympics in Tokyo. The six will be led by the Chef de Mission Ileana Rodriguez who was previously a parathlete swimmer for the US in 2012. The other five are Alia Issa and Ibrahim Al Hussein who are both from Syria and are based in Athens, the American-based Afghan refugee swimmer Abbas Karimi, the German-based Syrian refugee canoeist Anas Al Khalifa, and American based Iranian refugee discus thrower Shahrad Nasajpour. He hoped to win a medal at the paralympics and to return to the refugee camp where he has a young daughter. At the Games, Hakizimana withdrew from the repechage section due to an injury.
