= Ileana Rodriguez =

Cuban-born American Paralympic swimmer and sports administrator

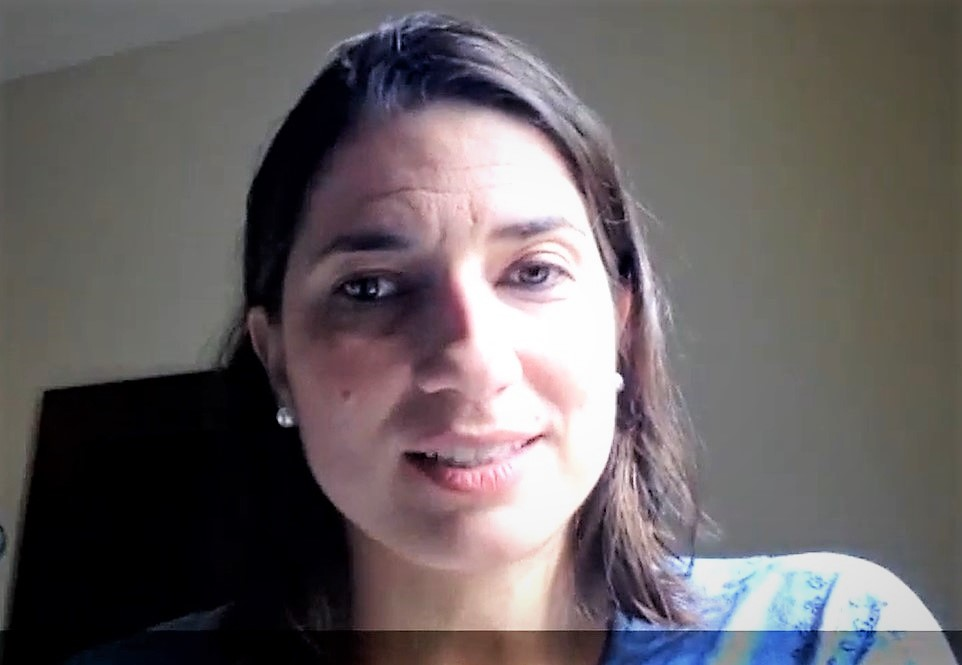
- Rodriguez interviewed in 2019
- Born: June 12, 1995 (age 31); Matanzas, Cuba
- Education: Florida International University
- Occupations: Paralympian and sports administrator
- Known for: Chef de Mission of the Refugee Paralympic Team at the 2020 Summer Paralympics

Ileana Rodriguez (born June 12, 1995) is a Cuban-born American Paralympic swimmer and sports administrator. She led the Refugee Paralympic Team at the 2020 Summer Paralympics as the Chef de Mission. She was to have been the IPC flag bearer but Abbas Karimi and Alia Issa were subsequently named as the two flag bearers.

Ileana Rodriguez is the CEO of Houston-based firm I Design Access LLC, which provides accessibility and inclusive design advice for major infrastructure projects. In 2021, Rodriguez was recognized for her work as one of the Top 25 News Makers in 2020 by the American weekly magazine Engineering News-Record (ENR). ENR recognizes construction industry leaders since 1964 who “tackle the most difficult challenges and make our world a better place.” Ileana Rodriguez also serves as a Commissioner for the Houston Planning and Houston Airport Commissions.

== Life ==
Rodriguez was born in Matanzas in Cuba, and she came to America with her mother, Ileana Laucirica, when she was fifteen. She experienced a spinal cord injury at age thirteen due to a congenital arteriovenous malformation. Her parents wanted a second opinion on her condition, so Rodriguez and her mother left Cuba and came to Miami. They preferred the US, and they asked her father, Eloy Rodriguez, her brother, also Eloy, and her sister, Ana Maria, to leave Cuba and join them. When she was 21, she found that the only place she was comfortable out of her wheelchair was in a swimming pool. Rodriguez attended Florida International University to study architecture, and she swam at the 2011 Parapan American Games. She then swam for the United States at the 2012 Summer Paralympics in London. She came 7th in the 100m breaststroke.

Rodriguez is the 200m breaststroke record holder.

In 2015, she was elected as the athlete representative on the Americas Paralympic Committee. Rodriguez served for four years and stood again for re-election in 2019.

In June 2021, Rodriguez, a former refugee who now lives in Miami, was chosen to lead the 2020 Independent Paralympic Athletes Team at the 2020 Summer Paralympics. The founder of the Paralympic Games, Ludwig Guttmann, was a refugee. Rodriguez was to have had the honour of carrying the flag in the opening ceremony and the team will be the first to enter the stadium. The day before the event it was decided that there would be two flag carriers, Alia Issa and Abbas Karimi.

Rodriguez was the Chef de Mission. She saw her role as one of communication between the International Paralympic Committee (IPC) and the competing athletes. This was the second time a refugee team had been formed but the IPC saw the previous two-person Independent Paralympic Team as an uncoordinated team. That team, although small, was very well received. The new team for 2020 consisted of six athletes who were refugees from Syria, Iran, Burundi, and Afghanistan at the 2020 Summer Paralympics in Tokyo. Two of the athletes are Alia Issa and Ibrahim Al Hussein who are both from Syria and based in Athens. Alia Issa is the only woman. Two of the athletes, Afghan refugee swimmer Abbas Karimi and Iranian discus thrower Shahrad Nasajpour, are based in the United States. The last two are canoeist Anas Al Khali, the third Syrian refugee, and the Burundian refugee Parfait Hakizimana who is based in Germany. Hakizimana's final approval to compete was dependent on getting classified by August 1, 2021.

In 2022 Rodriguez was included in the 25 News Makers in infrastructure recognised by the US magazine Engineering News-Record.
