= Swimming at the 2020 Summer Paralympics – Men's 50 metre backstroke S5 =

Men's 50 metre backstroke S5 at the XVI Paralympic Games
- Venue: Tokyo Aquatics Centre
- Dates: 30 August 2021
- Competitors: 15 from 11 nations

Medalists
1st place, gold medalist(s)		Zheng Tao	China
2nd place, silver medalist(s)		Ruan Jingsong	China
3rd place, bronze medalist(s)		Wang Lichao	China

The men's 50 metre backstroke S5 event at the 2020 Paralympic Games took place on 30 August 2021, at the Tokyo Aquatics Centre.

== Heats ==
The swimmers with the top eight times, regardless of heat, advanced to the final.

Rank	Heat	Lane	Name	Nationality	Time	Notes
1	1	5	Ruan Jingsong	China	33.27	Q, PR
2	2	5	Yaroslav Semenenko	Ukraine	35.07	Q
3	1	4	Wang Lichao	China	36.21	Q
4	2	4	Zheng Tao	China	37.15	Q
5	2	3	Daniel de Faria Dias	Brazil	37.19	Q
6	1	3	Igor Plotnikov	RPC	37.93	Q
7	2	6	Andrew Mullen	Great Britain	37.99	Q
8	1	6	Antoni Ponce Bertran	Spain	38.57	Q
9	2	2	Võ Thanh Tùng	Vietnam	40.07	
10	1	2	Kaede Hinata	Japan	41.97	
11	2	7	Beytullah Eroğlu	Turkey	41.99	
12	2	1	Siyazbek Daliyev	Kazakhstan	42.61	
13	2	8	Dmitrii Cherniaev	RPC	42.99	
14	1	1	Artur Kubasov	RPC	43.19	
15	1	7	Abbas Karimi	Refugee Paralympic Team	46.48	

== Final ==
50m backstroke final
Rank	Lane	Name	Nationality	Time	Notes
1st place, gold medalist(s)	6	Zheng Tao	China	31.42	WR
2nd place, silver medalist(s)	4	Ruan Jingsong	China	32.97	
3rd place, bronze medalist(s)	3	Wang Lichao	China	33.38	
4	5	Yaroslav Semenenko	Ukraine	35.05	
5	2	Daniel de Faria Dias	Brazil	35.99	
6	7	Igor Plotnikov	RPC	37.40	
7	1	Andrew Mullen	Great Britain	37.96	
8	8	Antoni Ponce Bertran	Spain	38.42	
