= Mahama Refugee Camp =

Refugee camp in Kirehe District, Rwanda

Mahama Refugee Camp, Rwanda
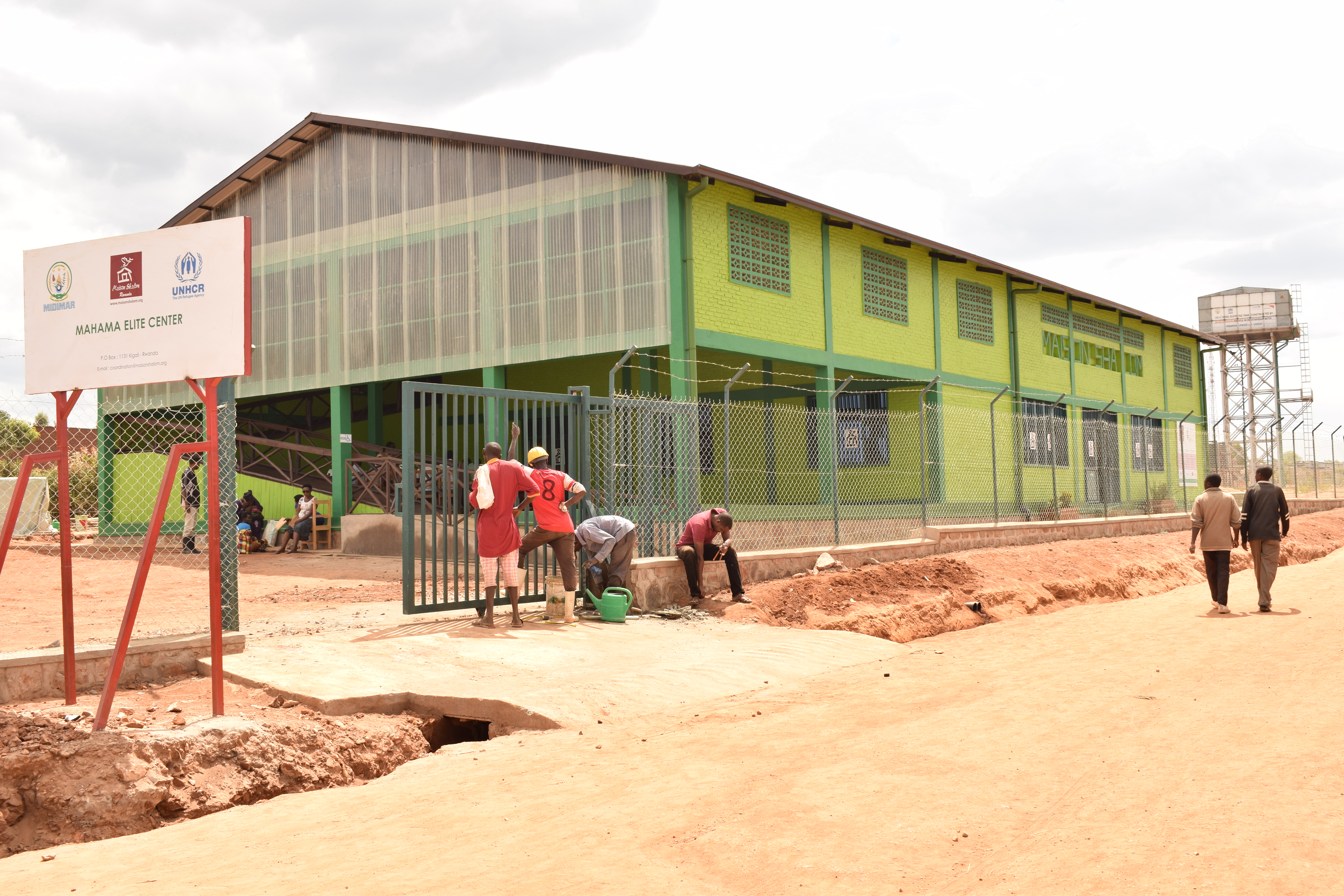
- The Elite Center of Maison Shalom opened in 2018

- Location in Rwanda
- Coordinates: 02°18′50″S 30°50′31″E
- Country: Rwanda
- Admin. Province: Eastern Province
- District: Kirehe District

Mahama Refugee Camp is a refugee camp in Kirehe District in the Eastern Province of Rwanda, near the Kagera River which is the border with Tanzania. In 2016, it had over 50,000 residents, making it the size of one of Rwanda's ten largest cities. In 2021, there were over 100,000 refugees in Rwanda and most of them were here. In 2023 the population was reported to be 62,486 individuals from 16,941 households with the majority from Burundi.

== History ==
Since 2015, more than 280,000 Burundians had been forced to flee and to seek refuge in neighbouring countries such as Rwanda, Tanzania and Uganda. Among them, were more than 47,000 who went to Rwanda. Mahama Refugee Camp was founded in April 2015.

In September 2016 it was estimated that the camp housed just over 50,000 refugees of several nationalities with more arriving each day. This camp is considered to be a model case of refugee management in the East African Region. Initially the camp consisted of just tents but within 18 months semipermanent buildings were being built using mud bricks. The camp in 2016 had a school with over 100 classrooms where over 11,000 children attended what had become the largest school in Rwanda. The camp had local leaders in the 25 "villages" that make up the camp as well as two health centres, a bus service and a market of stall holders. In eighteen months the refugee camp rivalled the sixth biggest city in Rwanda in terms of population.

In 2021 there were estimated to be 125,000 refugees in Rwanda despite 27,000 returning to Burundi. Only 10% of these still in Rwanda were not in refugee camps. The vast majority of these were in Mahama. The camp remains full as refugees were moved here from Gihembe camp which closed in October and another camp's refugees (Kigeme) will be moved in when Mahama has space to spare.

In 2021 the International Paralympic Committee decided to support six athletes as part of the Independent Paralympic Athletes at the 2020 Summer Paralympics. Parfait Hakizimana of the Taekwondo Humanitarian Foundation, who is from Mahama, was one of the athletes. He competed in Tokyo at Taekwondo in the under 61 kg category. At the Games, Hakizimana withdrew from the repechage section due to an injury.

In September 2023 UNHCR said that there were over 62,000 people living there with the majority being under the age of eighteen.

== Notable residents ==
Burundian parataekwondo practitioner Parfait Hakizimana resides in the camp.
