= Enderson Santos =

Venezuelan Paralympic athlete (born 1987)

Personal information
- Full name: Enderson Germán Santos González
- Born: 23 June 1987 (age 39) Caracas, Venezuela

Sport
- Sport: Para-athletics
- Disability class: T11
- Event(s): 100 metres 400 metres
Medal record
Para-athletics
Representing Venezuela
Paralympic Games
Gold medal – first place	2024 Paris	400 m T11

Enderson Germán Santos González (Note: In this Spanish name, the first or paternal surname is Santos and the second or maternal family name is González.) (born 23 June 1987), also known as Enderson Santos or Enderson Santos González, is a Venezuelan T11 Paralympic sprint runner.

== Career ==
He represented Venezuela at the 2024 Summer Paralympics and won a gold medal in the 400 metres T11 event.
