= Swimming at the 2020 Summer Paralympics – Men's 50 metre butterfly S5 =

Men's 50 metre butterfly S5 at the XVI Paralympic Games
- Venue: Tokyo Aquatics Centre
- Dates: 27 August 2021
- Competitors: 18 from 13 nations

Medalists
1st place, gold medalist(s)		Zheng Tao	China
2nd place, silver medalist(s)		Wang Lichao	China
3rd place, bronze medalist(s)		Yuan Weiyi	China

The men's 50 metre butterfly S5 event at the 2020 Paralympic Games took place on 27 August 2021, at the Tokyo Aquatics Centre.

== Heats ==
The swimmers with the top eight times, regardless of heat, advanced to the final.

Rank	Heat	Lane	Name	Nationality	Time	Notes
1	1	4	Yuan Weiyi	China	32.30	Q, PR
2	3	4	Zheng Tao	China	32.34	Q
3	3	5	Yaroslav Semenenko	Ukraine	34.55	Q
4	1	5	Siyazbek Daliyev	Kazakhstan	35.73	Q
5	1	3	Abbas Karimi	Refugee Paralympic Team	36.36	Q
6	2	4	Wang Lichao	China	36.41	Q
7	2	5	Daniel Dias	Brazil	37.27	Q
8	3	3	Kaede Hinata	Japan	37.80	Q
9	2	6	Dmitrii Cherniaev	RPC	38.72	
10	3	7	Koral Berkin Kutlu	Turkey	38.99	
11	1	6	Andrew Mullen	Great Britain	39.01	
12	3	6	Beytullah Eroğlu	Turkey	39.93	
13	3	2	Jamery Siga	Malaysia	40.32	
14	1	7	Arnošt Petráček	Czech Republic	41.41	
15	2	3	Igor Plotnikov	RPC	41.60	
16	2	7	Miguel Ángel Rincón	Colombia	42.18	
17	1	2	Artur Kubasov	RPC	42.24	
	2	2	Võ Thanh Tùng	Vietnam	DSQ	

== Final ==
50m butterfly final
Rank	Lane	Name	Nationality	Time	Notes
1st place, gold medalist(s)	5	Zheng Tao	China	30.62	WR
2nd place, silver medalist(s)	7	Wang Lichao	China	31.81	
3rd place, bronze medalist(s)	4	Yuan Weiyi	China	32.00	
4	3	Yaroslav Semenenko	Ukraine	35.13	
5	6	Siyazbek Daliyev	Kazakhstan	35.27	
6	1	Daniel Dias	Brazil	36.56	
7	8	Kaede Hinata	Japan	37.24	
8	2	Abbas Karimi	Refugee Paralympic Team	38.16	
