= Marguerite Barankitse =

Burundian humanitarian

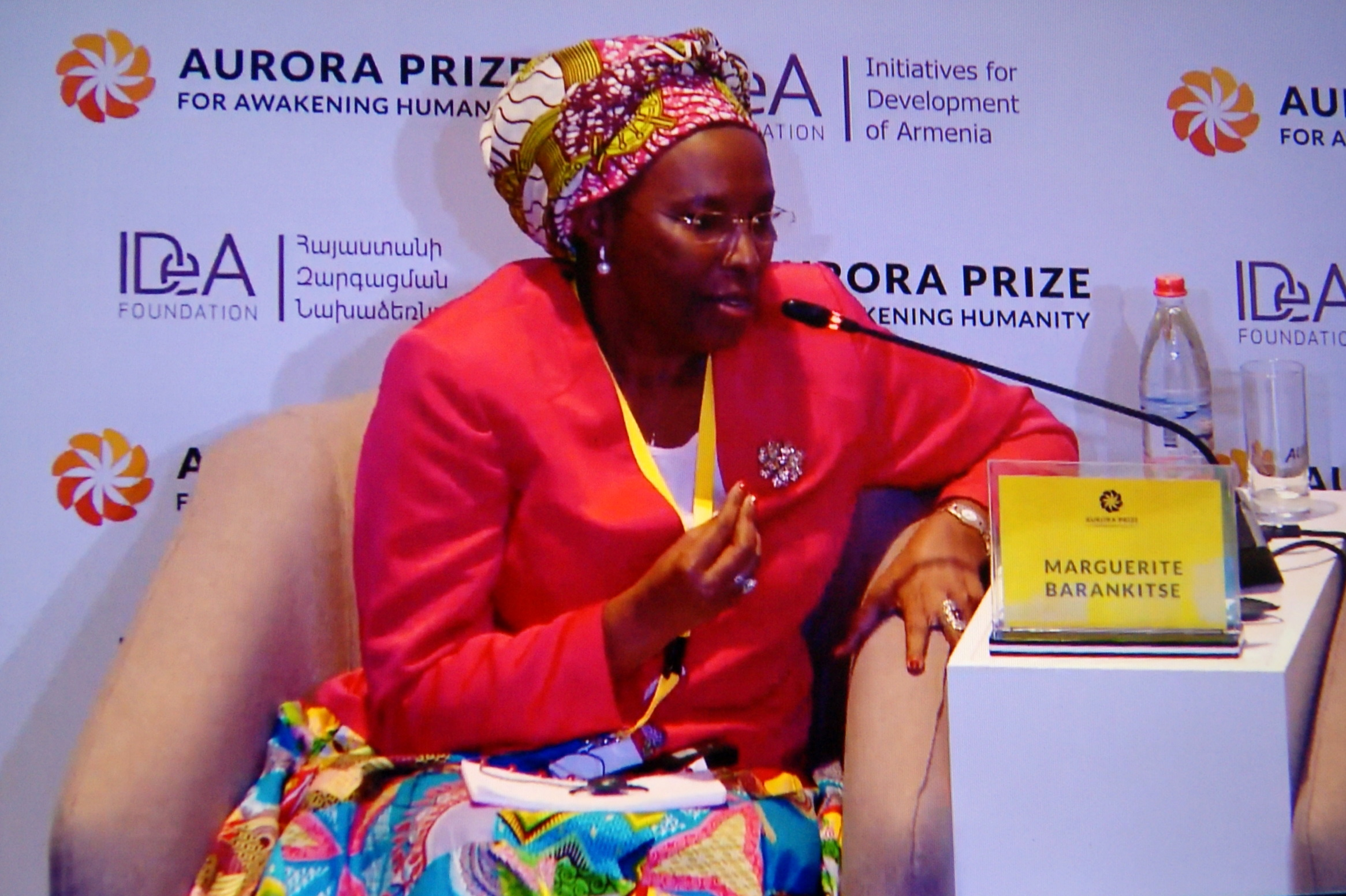
- Barankitse at the Aurora Dialogues in Yerevan, Armenia.
- Born: 1957 (age 68–69); Ruyigi, Burundi
- Occupation: Humanitarian activist
- Known for: Founder of Maison Shalom; Savior of 20,000+ orphans
- Notable work: Maison Shalom, Oasis of Peace (Kigali)
- Awards: Nansen Refugee Award (2004); Aurora Prize for Awakening Humanity (2016)
- Website: www.maisonshalom.org

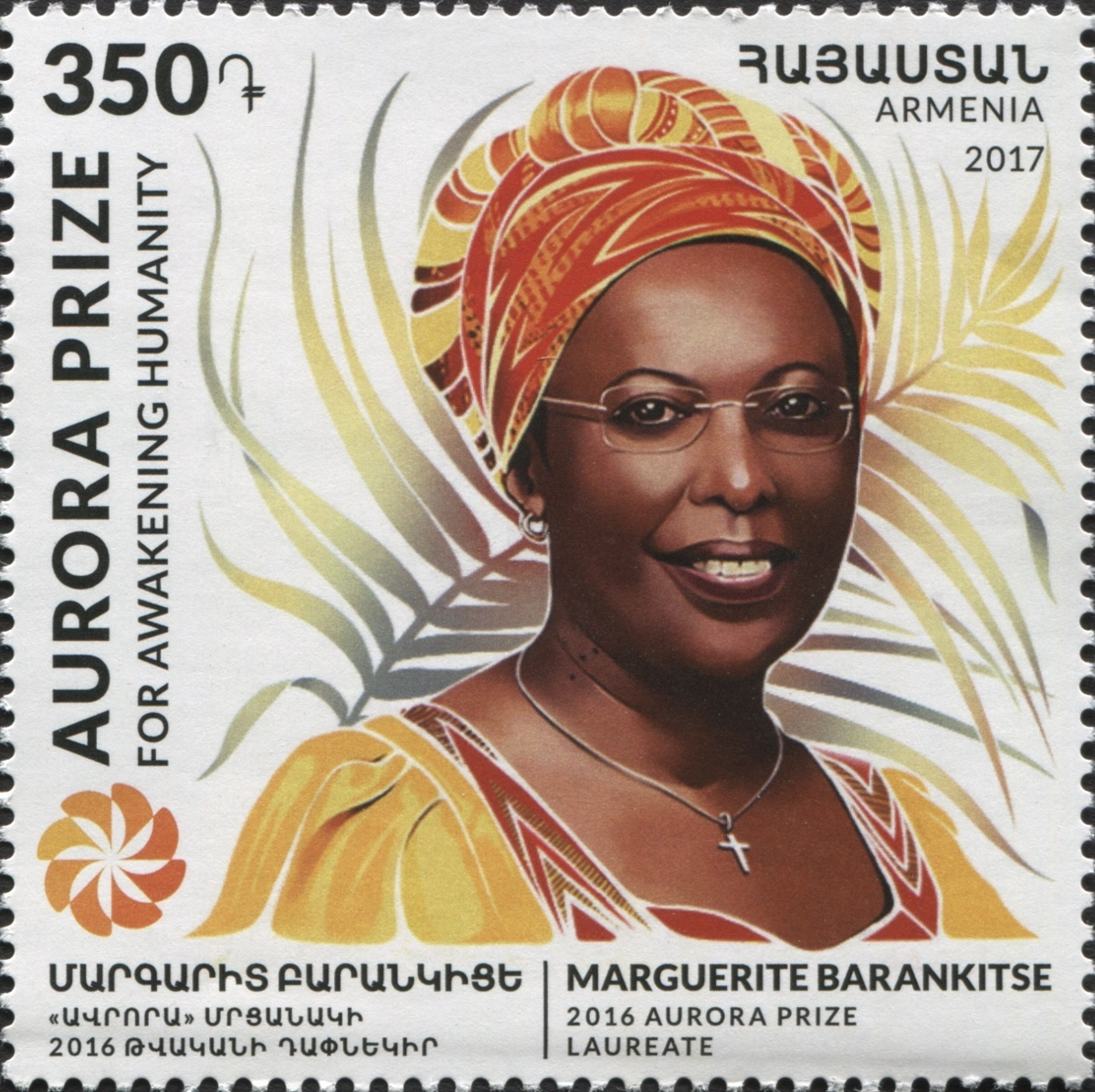
Barankitse on a 2017 Armenian stamp

Marguerite "Maggy" Barankitse (born in 1957 in Ruyigi, Ruyigi province, Burundi) is a Burundian humanitarian activist who works to improve the welfare of children and challenge ethnic discrimination in Burundi. After rescuing 25 children from a massacre, she was forced to witness the conflicts between the Hutu and Tutsi in her country in 1993. She established Maison Shalom, a shelter that provided access to healthcare, education, and culture to over 20,000 orphan children in need. Because she protested against a third term for President Pierre Nkurunziza, she lives in exile.

During the 26 years that it operated in Burundi, Maison Shalom grew into a large network of schools, hospitals, and healthcare services across the country. Its purpose was to improve the lives of Burundi's children, through integrated and sustainable development with the ultimate aim of fostering lasting peace in the country. However, in 2015 Barankitse was forced to flee her country, and Maison Shalom plunged into a political crisis. Far from surrendering, Barankitse shifted her focus and decided to dedicate all of her energy to helping more than 90,000 Burundian refugees in Rwanda. In 2017, she opened the Community Center Oasis of Peace in Kigali to help schoolchildren, offer psychological and social support to torture and rape victims, and implement sustainable development activities in areas such as health, education, vocational training, culture, and income-generation. She stated that her vision is to instill dignity in refugees to keep their dreams alive: "Evil never has the last word – Love always wins."

Barabkitse has received numerous awards, including the Juan Maria Bandres Prize for Asylum Rights, and the French Government's Human Rights Prize (both 1998), the World Children's Prize (2003), the Four Freedoms Award (Freedom From Want), the Voices of Courage Award of the Women's Commission for Women and Refugee Children (both 2004), the Nansen Refugee Award (2005), the Opus Prize (2008), the UNESCO Prize (both 2008), the Prize for Conflict Prevention (2011), and the Aurora Prize for Awakening Humanity (2016).

== Biography ==
Marguerite "Maggy" Barankitse was born in 1957 in Ruyigi, East-Burundi, one of the poorest regions of the country. Of Tutsi heritage, she was a teacher at a local secondary school but was fired because of her protests against discrimination between the Hutu and Tutsi in the field. She then went to work as a secretary for the Catholic bishop in Ruyigi. Despite mounting tensions, Barankitse put her dream of ethnic harmony into practice by adopting seven children: four Hutus and three Tutsis. As violence escalated between the two tribes following the assassination of the first democratically elected president of Burundi, a group of armed Tutsis descended on Ruyigi on October 23, 1993, to kill the Hutu families who were hiding in the Bishop's manor. Barankitse had managed to hide many of the children but was caught by the fighters. They beat and humiliated her and forced her to watch the killing of 72 Hutus, but she refused to tell them where the children were hidden. Ultimately, she was spared only because of her Tutsi heritage. After the ordeal, Barankitse gathered her adopted children and the surviving orphans and hid them in a nearby school. As more and more children sought shelter with her, she decided to create a small nongovernmental organisation: Maison Shalom, the House of Peace. Her house was open to children of all ethnic origins: Tutsi, Hutu, and Twa. She calls them "My Hutsitwa children", and they call her Oma (or "grandmother" in German). In the following years, Maison Shalom in Ruyigi was one of the few places in Burundi where Hutus and Tutsis cohabited in harmony.

Since the events of 1993, over 20,000 children and youth have benefited from Maison Shalom. Before the current crisis in Burundi, the organisation employed more than 270 people, including nurses, psychologists, and educators who implemented special projects for the children.

In April 2016, Barankitse spoke out against the third term of President Pierre Nkurunziza and joined the youth demonstrations denouncing him. As a result, she was obliged to hide for a month in an embassy in Bujumbura. Eventually, she had to flee; the government had her name on a death list. Barankitse found herself a refugee.

== Maison Shalom in Burundi ==
In the autumn of 1993, after the assassination of Melchior Ndadaye, the first democratically elected president of Burundi (a Hutu), the Burundian civil war began with massacres taking place throughout the country. In the province of Ruyigi, disaster struck on 24 October. To exact vengeance for the killing of members of their ethnic group, the Tutsi hunted the town's Hutus, who were hiding in diocese buildings. Barankitse, a Tutsi, was also there, and she tried to reason with the group of Tutsi not to use violence. However, her efforts were in vain: They decided to tie her to a chair and forced her to watch the killing of 72 of her friends. A few hours after the massacre, the children of the victims started to come out of their hiding places. That day, Barankitse says, she realized that her mission would be to fight the violence ravaging her country by giving those children, and the 20,000 who would follow, an alternative to hate. Amid the prevailing disaster, the news spread rapidly about the "crazy woman of Ruyigi" who dared to take in all of the orphans who came to her, never refusing anyone. Twa, Hutu, Tutsi: Barankitse made no distinction.

Barankitse initially gathered the 25 orphaned children of the Ruyigi massacre. With the help of European and Burundian friends, she organized a network that provided care for a growing number of children. In May 1994, the Roman Catholic bishop of Ruyigi, Bishop Joseph Nduhirubusa agreed to transform a former school into a children's shelter called 'Maison Shalom'. It was named so named by the children, in memory of a song heard on the radio at the time, and because the word "peace" in Kirundi had been instrumentalized and defiled by the slaughterers on both sides of the conflict.

Maison Shalom's focus was predominantly children, including child soldiers, orphans, mutilated children, and minors in prison. However, its services were available to the entire community, having an impact not only on the lives of orphans but also the entire region that could access to its services. Maison Shalom's activities soon also expanded to other cities such as Butezi and Gizuru, where Barankitse opened other children's shelters.

Over the years, what was merely a shelter seeking to protect orphans from both sides after the civil war, grew into an entire village, and included a bank, a crèche, the REMA Hospital, a hotel, a shop, a resource centre for learning sewing and computing, a mechanic training school, a swimming pool, and even a cinema.

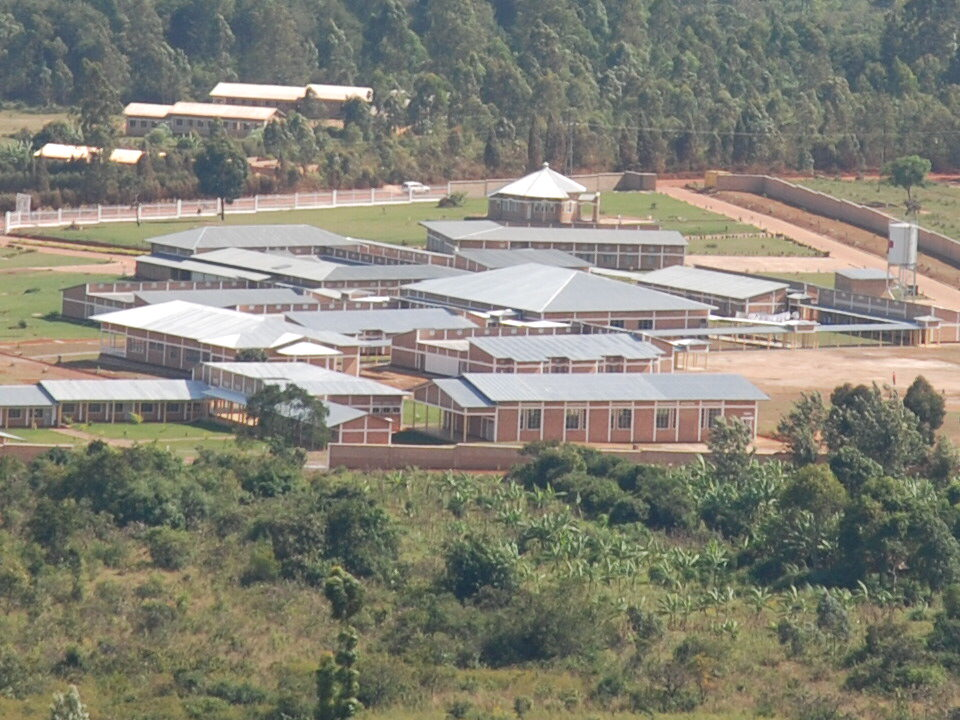
REMA Hospital built by Maison Shalom in Burundi

Many of the activities were income-generating initiatives run by the youth themselves, such as the guesthouse, the cinema, the car workshop, and the like. When they became independent, the young people supported by Maison Shalom received a small house and a plot of land.

In 2004 an estimated 20,000 children had benefited from Barankitse's help, either directly or indirectly.

By 2015, over 300 houses for children and youth aged between 4 and 20 had been built. The NGO also helped internally displaced persons and returning Burundian refugees to reintegrate in Ruyigi and to find their missing relatives. Barankitse was also on the frontline in the battle against HIV/AIDS, setting up counselling projects to promote HIV/AIDS prevention. She and her staff cared for over 100 HIV-infected children who had been abandoned or orphaned.

Barankitse also started an initiative to help imprisoned youth. Some children were born in prison, and she worked to find them a better life, through education and a home outside prison. Her team continued to promote agriculture and established a microfinance project to enable the parents to develop small businesses.

In 2015, however, everything fell apart. The Burundian government started suppressing protests against President Nkurunziza. Thousands of Burundians started fleeing to Rwanda, Uganda, Tanzania or the DRC. Barankitse protested, cared for the wounded young, and fed those who were in prison. But in June 2015, Barankitse was herself forced to flee. In Burundi, there is a price on her head.

== Maison Shalom Rwanda and the Community Center Oasis of Peace ==
Barankitse refused to spend her days in Europe comfortably and decided to dedicate her energy to help more than 90,000 Burundian refugees in Rwanda. She started with her expertise: education. She fought for education for children and university students in refugee camps. She put 126 children in preschool, 160 in secondary school, and obtained 353 scholarships for university-level refugee students to join Rwandan universities, and 10 scholarships for the best students to study in universities abroad.

In May 2017, Barankitse opened the Community Center Oasis of Peace for schoolchildren, offer psychological and social support to victims of torture and rape, and to implement activities of sustainable development in areas such as health, education, vocational training, culture, and income-generation. The center offers a variety of courses including in English language, culinary arts, tailoring, embroidery, and painting. It also has a restaurant and is cyber-equipped with computers with internet connections for research and basic computer training. Approximately 200 people come every day to the centre and benefit from the various services offered by Maison Shalom.

Maison Shalom seeks to help refugees and especially young people in exile to live in dignity, to use the period of exile for empowerment and forgiveness for those who forced them to flee their homeland.

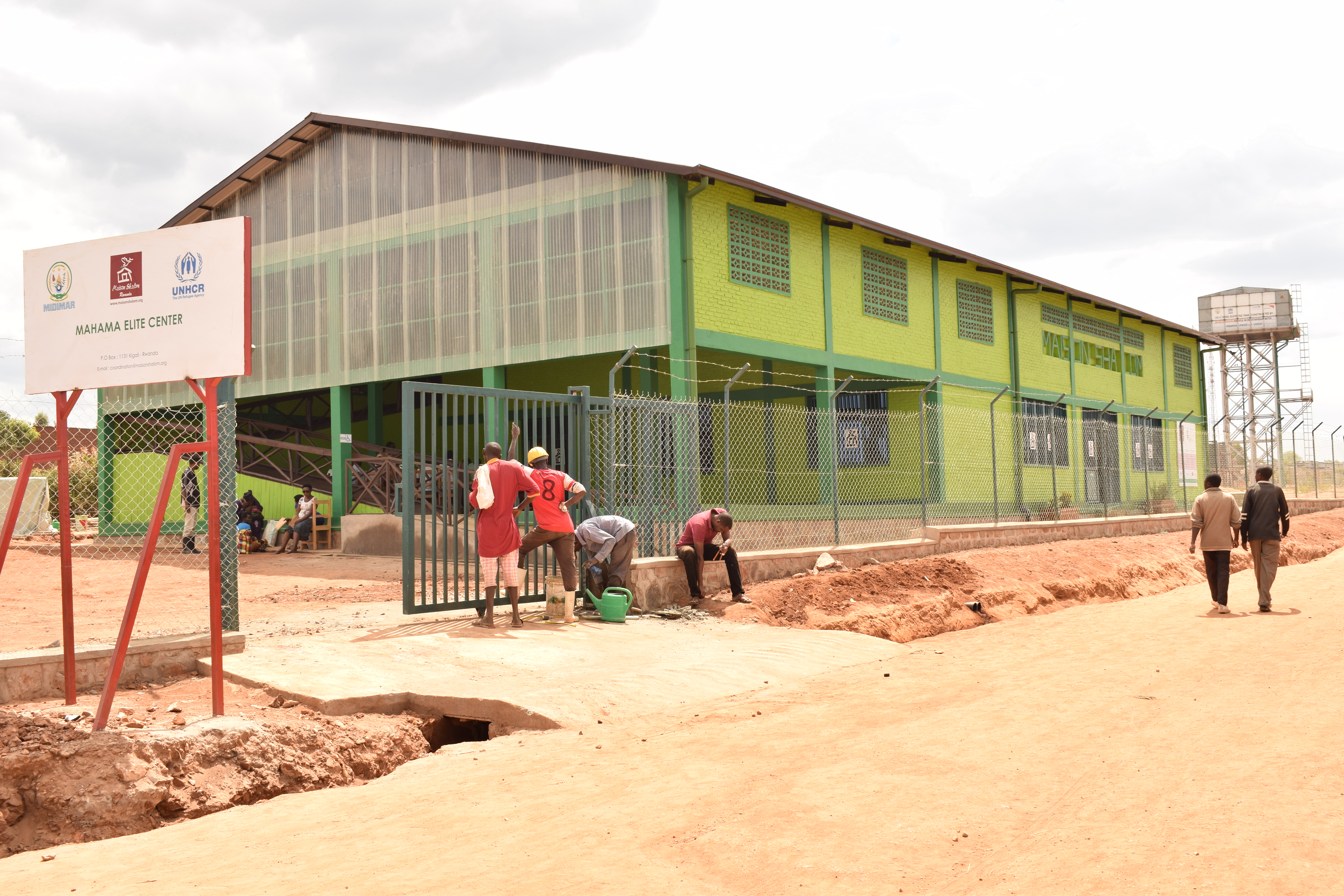

== Mahama Elite Center at Mahama Refugee Camp ==
Since 2015, more than 430,000 Burundians have been forced to flee and to seek refuge in neighbouring countries such as Rwanda, Tanzania, Uganda. Among them, more than 90,000 are in Rwanda, of which 58,000 live in Mahama Refugee Camp. This camp is considered to be a model case of refugee management in the East African Region.

To support the refugees living there, Maison Shalom opened the Mahama Elite Center on 22 June 2018. This training center was poised to offer vocational training and employment to Burundian refugees in the camp. The project will enable young people to improve their living conditions but also to strengthen their entrepreneurship skills.

== Awards and honours ==
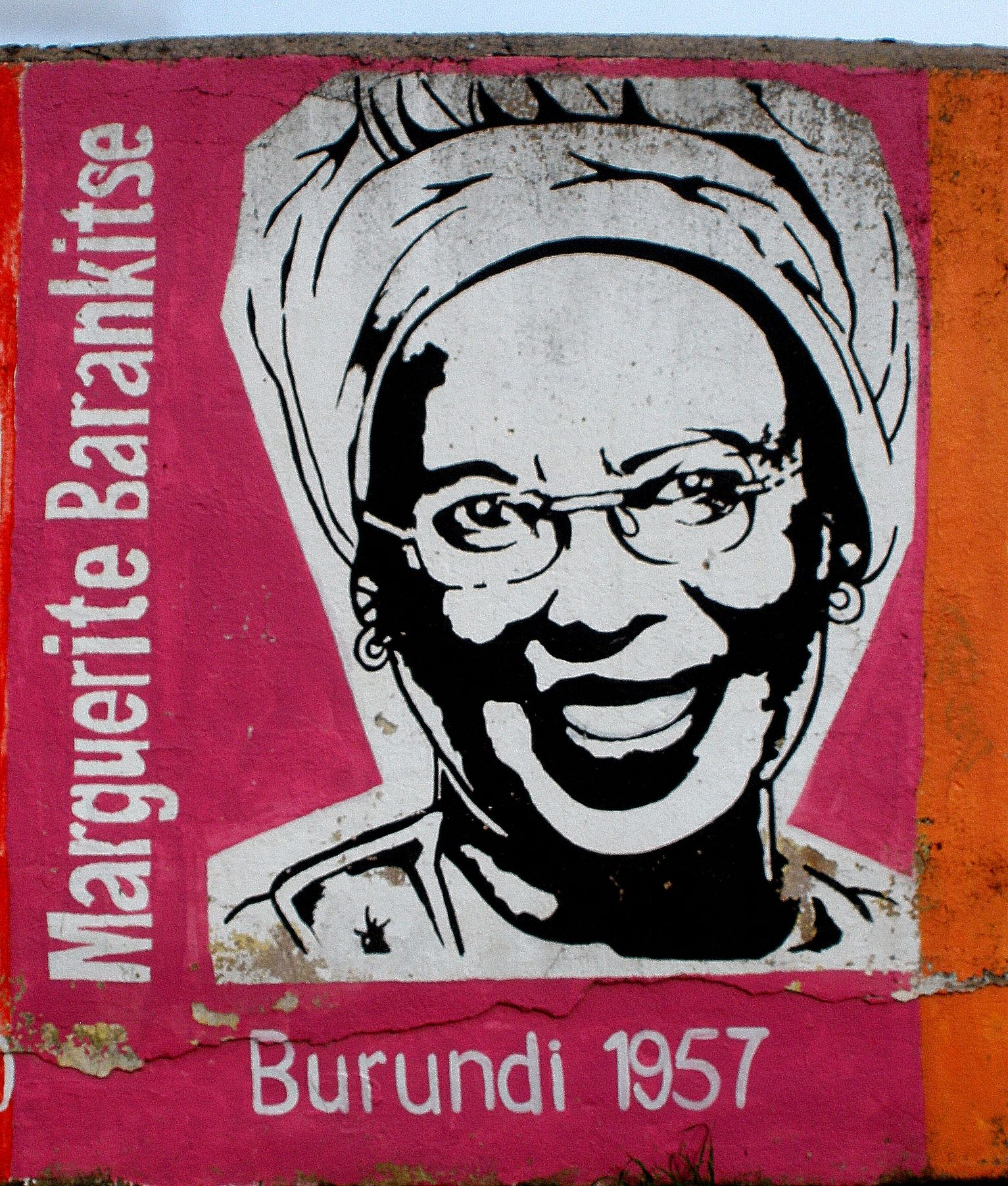
Graffiti of Marguerite Barankitse in Burgos, Spain

The scope of her action, as well as the fact that she protects all children without consideration of their origin, Tutsi or Hutu, brought Maggy praise from all corners of the world:

- 1998 : Prize of human rights, awarded by French government. – Liberté – Égalité – Fraternité
- 2000 : North-South Prize from the Council of Europe
- 2000 : courage trophy awarded by the monthly Africa International.
- 2003 : World's Children's Prize for the Rights of the Child
- 2004 : Voices of Courage Award of the Women's Commission for Women and Refugee Children
- 2004 : Nansen Refugee Award
- 2008 : Opus Prize
- 2008 : UNESCO Prize
- In June 2009, Grand Duchess Maria Teresa of Luxembourg, UNICEF Eminent Advocate for Children, visited Maison Shalom during a tour of Burundi. In October 2011, the Grand Duchess welcomed Marguerite Barankitse to Luxembourg to open a photographic exhibition in support of Maison Shalom.
- On November 24, 2011, Barankitse received the Prize for Conflict Prevention from the hands of Kofi Annan. The Conflict Prevention Prize is awarded every year by the Fondation Chirac, launched in 2008 by former French president Jacques Chirac.
- In 2011 Barankitse received the journalistic prize Golden Doves for Peace issued by the Italian Research Institute Archivio Disarmo.
- On April 24, 2016, Marguerite was awarded the $1.1 million Aurora Prize for Awakening Humanity, an award given to humanitarians in memory of the Armenian genocide.

== Honorary degrees ==
- 2017 Degree of Doctor of Laws (honoris causa) of Rhodes University, Eastern Cape, South Africa
- 2013 Emory University, Honorary Doctor's Degree, Atlanta, Georgia, USA
- 2013 Duke University, Honorary Doctor's Degree, Durham, North Carolina, USA, alongside Melinda Gates
- 2012 Université de Lille, France, Honorary Doctor's Degree
- 2011 Doctor Honoris Causa, Université Catholique de Lille, France
- 2004 Doctor Honoris Causa from the University of Louvain, Louvain-la-Neuve, Belgium

== Books about Maggy and Maison Shalom ==
- La haine n'aura pas le dernier mot, in French by Christel Martin, Editions Michel Albin 2005
- Madre di diecimila figli, Edition Piemme Bestseller 2010, translated into Italian from the French, La haine n'aura pas le dernier mot by Christel Martin
- Hummingbird, Why Am I Here? Maggy's Children, by Judith Debetencourt Hoskins, in English, 2012
