= Guillaume Junior Atangana =

Cameroonian Paralympic athlete (born 1999)

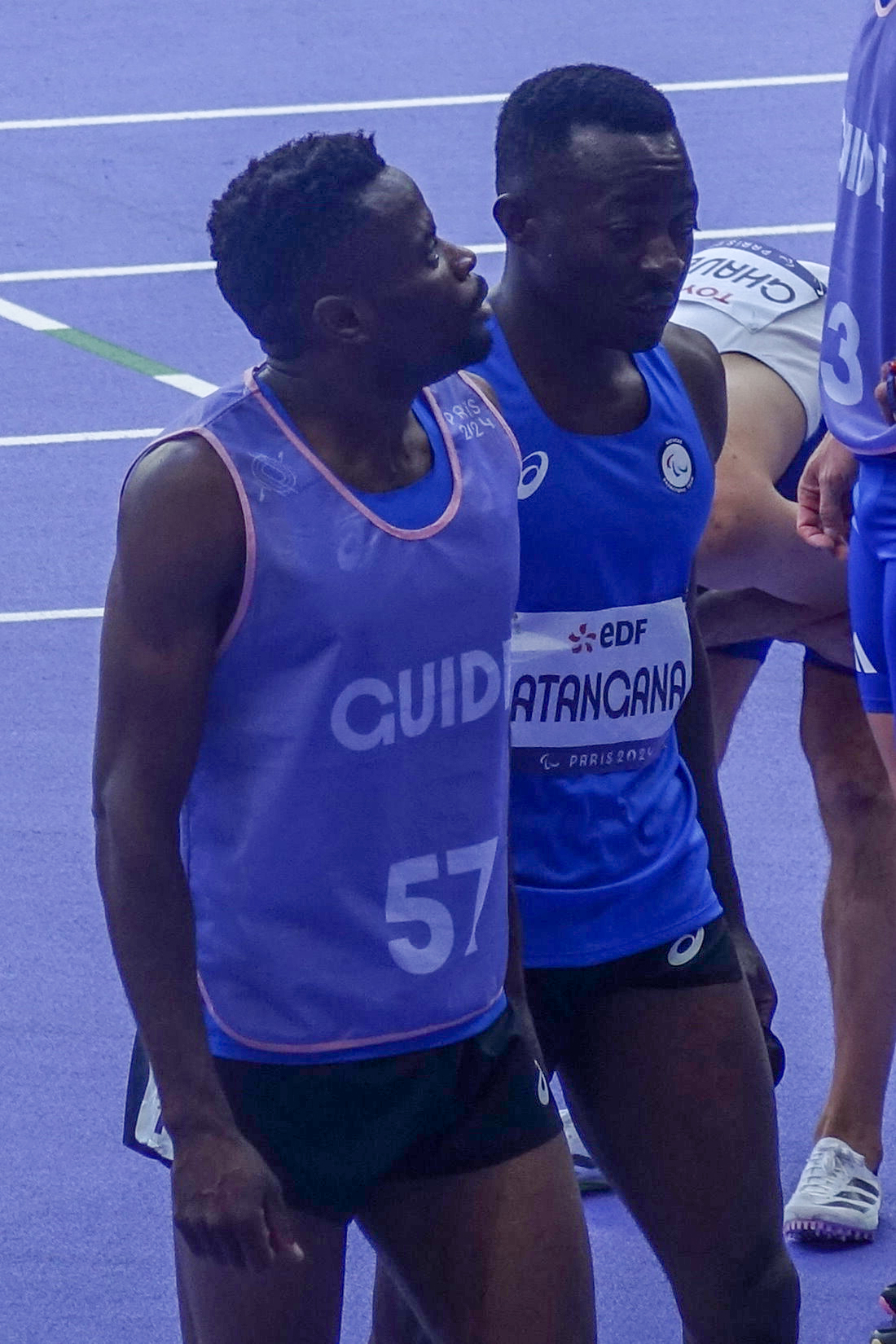
- Atangana (right) at the 2024 Summer Paralympics

Personal information
- Born: 22 January 1999 (age 27)

Sport
- Country: Cameroon
- Sport: Para-athletics
- Disability class: T11
- Events: 100 metres 400 metres
Medal record
Men's para-athletics
Representing the (International Paralympic Committee) Refugee Paralympic Team
Paralympic Games
Bronze medal – third place	2024 Paris	400 m T11
World Championships
Gold medal – first place	2025 New Delhi	400 m T11

Guillaume Junior Atangana (born 22 January 1999) is a Cameroonian T11 Paralympic sprint runner. He won the Paralympic Refugee Team's first gold medal at the World Para Athletics Championships in 2025.

== Career ==
He represented the Refugee Paralympic Team at the 2024 Summer Paralympics and won a bronze medal in the 400 metres T11 event. He competed at the 2025 World Para Athletics Championships and won a gold medal in the 400 metres T11 event. This was the Paralympic Refugee Team's first gold medal at the World Para Athletics Championships.
