= Independent Paralympic Athletes at the 2016 Summer Paralympics =

Individual Paralympic Athletes at the 2016 Summer Paralympics
- This flag is not correct. Please click here to see the correct one.
- IPC code: IPA
- NPC: Independent Paralympic Athletes

in Rio de Janeiro
- Competitors: 2 in 2 sports
- Flag bearer: Ibrahim Al Hussein
- Medals: Gold 0 Silver 0 Bronze 0 Total 0

Summer Paralympics appearances (overview)
- 1992; 1996; 2000; 2004–2012; 2016; 2020; 2024

Other related appearances
- Refugee Paralympic Team (2020)

The Independent Paralympic Athletes Team, a team consisting of refugee and asylee Paralympic athletes, competed at the 2016 Summer Paralympics in Rio de Janeiro, Brazil, from 7 September to 18 September 2016. Its creation was announced on 5 August 2016.

== Participation ==
The team was announced on August 5, 2016, by the International Paralympic Committee. Participants were nominated for the team by National Paralympic Committees who were aware of qualified sportspeople. The International Paralympic Committee stepped in to assist with getting athletes ready by doing a number of things, including insuring that athletes were classified.

On 26 August 2016, the IPC announced the two members of the refugee team: Ibrahim Al Hussein of Syria, who will compete in the S10 50 and 100 m freestyle swimming events, and Shahrad Nasajpour of Iran, who will compete in F37 Discus. Tony Sainsbury was the chef de mission of the team; Sainsbury has previously been the chef de mission of the British Paralympic Team at five Paralympics.

The team was considered a success and it was recreated as the Refugee Paralympic Team at the 2020 Summer Paralympics and both of the athletes in this team returned in 2020.

Parathlete	Country of origin	Host NPC	Sport	Event
Shahrad Nasajpour	Iran	USA	Para athletics	Men's Discus F37
Ibrahim Al Hussein	Syria	Greece	Para swimming	Men's 50m freestyle S9; Men's 100m freestyle S9

== Disability classifications ==
Every participant at the Paralympics has their disability grouped into one of five disability categories; amputation, the condition may be congenital or sustained through injury or illness; cerebral palsy; wheelchair athletes, there is often overlap between this and other categories; visual impairment, including blindness; Les autres, any physical disability that does not fall strictly under one of the other categories, for example dwarfism or multiple sclerosis. Each Paralympic sport then has its own classifications, dependent upon the specific physical demands of competition. Events are given a code, made of numbers and letters, describing the type of event and classification of the athletes competing. Some sports, such as athletics, divide athletes by both the category and severity of their disabilities, other sports, for example swimming, group competitors from different categories together, the only separation being based on the severity of the disability.

== Athletics ==
Athlete	Events	Result	Rank
Shahrad Nasajpour	Discus F37	39.64	11

== Swimming ==
Athlete	Event	Heat		Final	
Athlete	Event	Result	Rank	Result	Rank
Ibrahim Al Hussein	50 m freestyle S9	35.54	18	did not advance	
Ibrahim Al Hussein	100 m freestyle S9	1:20.98	21	did not advance	

== See also ==
- Refugee Olympic Team at the 2016 Summer Olympics
- Refugee Paralympic Team at the Paralympics
