= Athletics at the 2024 Summer Paralympics – Men's 400 metres T11 =

Men's 400 metres T11 at the XVII Paralympic Games
- Venue: Stade de France, Paris, France
- Dates: 31 August 2024 (round 1 & semi-finals); 1 September 2024 (final)
- Competitors: 14 from 11 nations
- Winning time: 50.58

Medalists
1st place, gold medalist(s)		Enderson German Santos Gonzalez	Venezuela
2nd place, silver medalist(s)		Timothee Adolphe	France
3rd place, bronze medalist(s)		Guillaume Junior Atangana	Refugee Paralympic Team

400 metres at the 2024 Summer Paralympics
Men · T11 · T12 · T13 · T20 · T36 · T37 · T38 · T47 · T52 · T53 · T54 · T62
Women · T11 · T12 · T13 · T20 · T37 · T38 · T47 · T53 · T54 ·

The Men's 400 metres T11 at the 2024 Summer Paralympics took place on 31 August and 1 September 2024 at the Stade de France in Paris.

== Records ==
World Record	Daniel Silva (BRA)	49.82	(Mexico) Guadalajara	18 November 2011
Paralympic Record	Jose Sayovo Armando (ANG)	50.03	(Greece) Athens	25 September 2004

Area	Time	Athlete	Location	Date
Africa				
America				
Asia				
Europe				
Oceania				

== Classification ==
The T11 category is for athletes with a visual impairment. A T11 athlete may be entirely without sight, or be able to perceive light, but have no ability to see the shape of a hand at any distance. T11 athletes commonly run with guides.

== Results ==
=== Round 1 ===
The first round of the Men's 400m T11 took place at the Stade de France on Saturday 31 August 2024 at 11:26 a.m. (CET (UTC+1)

14 athletes took part over 4 heats. The winner of each heat, and the next four fastest athletes, qualified for the semi-finals.

==== Heat 1 ====
Rank	Lane	Athlete	Nation	Time	Notes
1	5	Urganchbek Egamnazarov; Guide: Sardor Bakhtiyorov	Uzbekistan	52.90	Q
2	3	Gauthier Makunda; Guide: Lucas Mathonat	France	53.20	SB
3	1	Ananias Shikongo; Guide: Even Tjiuiju	Namibia	53.51	
—	7	Husain Mohamed; Guide: Abdallah Djimel	Bahrain	DQ	R19.4

==== Heat 2 ====
Rank	Lane	Athlete	Nation	Time	Notes
1	5	Guillaume Junior Atangana; Guide: Donard Nyamjua	Refugee Paralympic Team	51.95	Q, PB
2	3	Chris Kinda; Guide: Riwaldo Goagoseb	Namibia	53.00	q
3	7	Daniel Mendes da Silva; Guide: Wendel de Souza Silva	Brazil	53.03	
—	1	Zimesele Khamoqane; Guide: Komane Ralejoe	Lesotho	DQ	R19.4

==== Heat 3 ====
Rank	Lane	Athlete	Nation	Time	Notes
1	7	Timothee Adolphe; Guide: Jeffrey Lami	France	51.39	Q
2	3	Eduardo Uceda Novas; Guide: Diego Folgado Munoz	Spain	52.79	q
3	5	Di Dongdong; Guide: Lian Jiageng	China	57.70	SB

==== Heat 4 ====
Rank	Lane	Athlete	Nation	Time	Notes
1	7	Enderson German Santos Gonzalez; Guide: Eubrig Maza	Venezuela	51.51	Q, PB
2	3	Mohammed Ayade; Guide: Ahmed Al-Kinani	Iraq	51.98	q, PB
3	5	Felipe de Souza Gomes; Guide: Jonas Alexandre de Lima Silva	Brazil	52.92	q

=== Semi-finals ===
The semi-finals of the Men's 400m T11 took place at the Stade de France on Saturday 31 August 2024 at 6:43 p.m (CET (UTC+1)

8 qualifiers from the first round took part over two heats. The winners and the next two fastest athletes qualified for the final.

==== Heat 1 ====
Rank	Lane	Athlete	Nation	Time	Notes
1	5	Guillaume Junior Atangana; Guide: Donard Nyamjua	Refugee Paralympic Team	51.03	Q, PB
2	3	Enderson German Santos Gonzalez; Guide: Eubrig Maza	Venezuela	51.71	q
3	7	Eduardo Uceda Novas; Guide: Diego Folgado Munoz	Spain	52.16	SB
4	1	Felipe de Souza Gomes; Guide: Jonas Alexandre de Lima Silva	Brazil	52.85	

==== Heat 2 ====
Rank	Lane	Athlete	Nation	Time	Notes
1	5	Timothee Adolphe; Guide: Jeffrey Lami	France	50.87	Q
2	7	Mohammed Ayade; Guide: Ahmed Al-Kinani	Iraq	52.04	q
3	1	Chris Kinda; Guide: Riwaldo Goagoseb	Namibia	52.95	
4	3	Urganchbek Egamnazarov; Guide: Sardor Bakhtiyorov	Uzbekistan	52.98	

=== Final ===
The final of the Men's 400m T11 took place at the Stade de France on Sunday 1 September 2024 at 8:05 p.m. (CET (UTC+1)

Rank	Lane	Athlete	Nation	Time	Notes
1st place, gold medalist(s)	7	Enderson Germán Santos González; Guide: Eubrig José Maza Caraballo	Venezuela	50.58	PB
2nd place, silver medalist(s)	5	Timothée Adolphe; Guide: Jeffrey Lami	France	50.75	
3rd place, bronze medalist(s)	3	Guillaume Junior Atangana; Guide: Donard Ndim Nyamjua	Refugee Paralympic Team	50.89	PB
4	1	Mohammed Ayade; Guide: Ahmed Al-Kinani	Iraq	51.25	AR
