= Independent Paralympians at the Paralympic Games =

Individual Paralympic Athletes at the Paralympics
- Flag of the International Paralympic Committee
- IPC code: IPA
- Medals: Gold 0 Silver 0 Bronze 0 Total 0

Summer appearances
- Independent Paralympic Participants (1992); Individual Paralympic Athletes (2000); Independent Paralympic Athletes (2016); RPC (2020); Neutral Paralympics Athletes (2024)

Winter appearances
- Neutral Paralympic Athletes (2018)

Athletes have competed as Independent Paralympians at the Paralympic Games for various reasons, including political transition, international sanctions, suspensions of National Paralympic Committees and compassion.

== 1992 Winter and Summer Paralympics ==
Independent Paralympic Participants at the Summer Paralympics was the name given to athletes from the Federal Republic of Yugoslavia at the 1992 Summer Paralympics in Barcelona. Athletes from the parts of Yugoslavia still terming themselves "Yugoslavia" had competed as "Independent Olympic Participants" at the 1992 Summer Olympics, also hosted by Barcelona. They were not permitted to participate as "Yugoslavia", due to United Nations Security Council Resolution 757 placing sanctions on the country.

In addition, 16 athletes competed as Independent Paralympic Participants at the 1992 Summer Paralympics winning eight medals.

Medal	Name	Games	Sport	Event
Gold	Nada Vuksanovic	1992 Barcelona	Athletics	Women's Discus B2
Gold	Ruzica Aleksov	1992 Barcelona	Shooting	Mixed Air Pistol SH1>3
Gold	Branimir Jovanovski	1992 Barcelona	Shooting	Mixed Air Pistol SH1
Gold	Nenad Krisanovic	1992 Barcelona	Swimming	Men's 50 m Breaststroke SB2
Silver	Nada Vuksanovic	1992 Barcelona	Athletics	Women's Shot put B2
Silver	Radomir Rakonjac	1992 Barcelona	Shooting	Mixed Air Pistol SH1
Silver	Nenad Krisanovic	1992 Barcelona	Swimming	Men's 50 m Butterfly S3-4
Bronze	Zlatko Kesler	1992 Barcelona	Table tennis	Men's Singles 3

== 2000 Summer Paralympics ==
Two athletes competed as Individual Paralympic Athletes at the 2000 Summer Paralympics.

== 2016 Summer Paralympics ==
Like for the Olympics, a team of refugees has competed for the first time as Independent Paralympic Athletes at the 2016 Summer Paralympics.

== 2018 Winter Paralympics ==
Russia is currently suspended by the International Paralympic Committee, so status remains unclear due to the state-sponsored doping program scandal.

The Russian Paralympic Committee remains suspended from the Paralympic movement since 2016, due to the state-sponsored doping programme scandal, but the International Paralympic Committee has allowed athletes deemed clean to participate in five sports. They will compete under the Paralympic flag, and the Paralympic anthem will be used during ceremonies for those who win gold medals.

== 2020 Summer Paralympics ==
A Refugee Paralympic Team (following the model used by the IOC for its sponsored Olympic team since 2016), is separated at the 2020 Summer Paralympics from the former Independent Paralympic Athletes.

The Russian Paralympic Committee, still suspended from the IPC and the IOC, was allowed to propose athletes, no longer competing as "independent" or "neutral" paralympians, but still with the supervision of the IPC. However, they did not compete under the name and with the national flag and anthem of Russia, but under the acronym RPC and with the Paralympic flag and anthem.

== 2022 Winter Paralympics ==
Athletes from Russia were scheduled to compete at the 2022 Winter Paralympics as Neutral Paralympic Athletes and athletes from Belarus as Paralympic Neutral Athletes. On 3 March 2022, both nations' athletes were banned from competing, reversing the previous decision to allow them to compete as neutrals.

Russian athletes were previously scheduled to compete under the flag of the Russian Paralympic Committee as a result of doping-related sanctions. On 9 December 2019, the World Anti-Doping Agency (WADA) banned Russia from all international sport for a period of four years, after the Russian government was found to have tampered with lab data that it provided to WADA in January 2019 as a condition of the Russian Anti-Doping Agency being reinstated. On 26 April 2021, it was confirmed Russian athletes would represent the Russian Paralympic Committee, with the acronym 'RPC', at the 2020 Summer Paralympics and the 2022 Winter Paralympics.

The Russian Paralympic Committee delegation was banned from participating in the 2022 Winter Paralympics after Russia's invasion of Ukraine in violation of the Olympic Truce. On 2 March 2022, the International Paralympic Committee (IPC) decided that Belarusian and Russian athletes would be allowed to compete at the Games as neutral athletes with their results not counting in the medal standings. The athletes would still have received medals during ceremonies. As a result of criticism by several National Paralympic Committees, who threatened to boycott the Games, the IPC announced on 3 March 2022 that they would reverse their earlier decision, banning Russian and Belarusian athletes from competing at the 2022 Winter Paralympics.

Before being banned from the Winter Paralympics, 71 athletes from Russia were expected to compete. The athletes were scheduled to compete in all sports included in the programme of the Games. In total, 12 athletes from Belarus were expected to compete.

Pavel Rozhkov, who served as interim Russian Paralympic Committee (RPC) president in 2021, served as Chef de Mission of the Russian delegation. In total, the Russian delegation consisted of ten alpine skiers, 33 skiers in biathlon and cross-country skiing, six snowboarders and the para ice hockey and wheelchair curling teams.

== See also ==
- Independent Olympians at the Olympic Games
