= Swimming at the 2016 Summer Paralympics – Men's 50 metre freestyle S9 =

Men's 50 metre freestyle S9 at the XV Paralympic Games
- Venue: Olympic Aquatics Stadium
- Dates: 13 September 2016
- Competitors: 18 from 13 nations

Medalists
1st place, gold medalist(s)		Matthew Wylie	Great Britain
2nd place, silver medalist(s)		Timothy Disken	Australia
3rd place, bronze medalist(s)		Takuro Yamada	Japan

The Men's 50 metre freestyle S9 event at the 2016 Paralympic Games took place on 13 September 2016, at the Olympic Aquatics Stadium. Three heats were held. The swimmers with the eight fastest times advanced to the final.

== Heats ==
=== Heat 1 ===
11:24 13 September 2016:

Rank	Lane	Name	Nationality	Time	Notes
1	5	Ryan Crouch	Great Britain	26.54	Q
2	3	Ruiter Silva	Brazil	26.68	Q
3	4	Leo Lahteenmaki	Finland	26.74	
4	6	Brenden Hall	Australia	27.05	
5	2	Timothy Hodge	Australia	27.55	
6	7	Ibrahim Al Hussein	Individual Paralympic Athletes	35.54	

=== Heat 2 ===
11:28 13 September 2016:

Rank	Lane	Name	Nationality	Time	Notes
1	4	Timothy Disken	Australia	26.08	Q
2	5	Takuro Yamada	Japan	26.20	Q
3	6	Vanilton Filho	Brazil	26.69	
4	3	David Grachat	Portugal	27.03	
5	2	Dimosthenis Michalentzakis	Greece	27.50	
6	7	Juan Castillo Estevez	Cuba	27.99	

=== Heat 3 ===
11:30 13 September 2016:

Rank	Lane	Name	Nationality	Time	Notes
1	4	Matthew Wylie	Great Britain	25.99	Q
2	5	Jose Antonio Mari Alcaraz	Spain	26.15	Q
3	3	Tamás Tóth	Hungary	26.22	Q
4	7	Tamás Sors	Hungary	26.32	Q
5	2	Cody Bureau	United States	27.60	
5	6	Ilija Tadic	Montenegro	27.60	

== Final ==
19:49 13 September 2016:

Rank	Lane	Name	Nationality	Time	Notes
1st place, gold medalist(s)	4	Matthew Wylie	Great Britain	25.95	
2nd place, silver medalist(s)	5	Timothy Disken	Australia	25.99	
3rd place, bronze medalist(s)	6	Takuro Yamada	Japan	26.00	
4	7	Tamás Sors	Hungary	26.04	
5	3	Jose Antonio Mari Alcaraz	Spain	26.11	
6	2	Tamás Tóth	Hungary	26.18	
7	8	Ruiter Silva	Brazil	26.62	
8	1	Ryan Crouch	Great Britain	26.76	
