= Timothy Disken =

Australian Paralympic swimmer (born 1996)

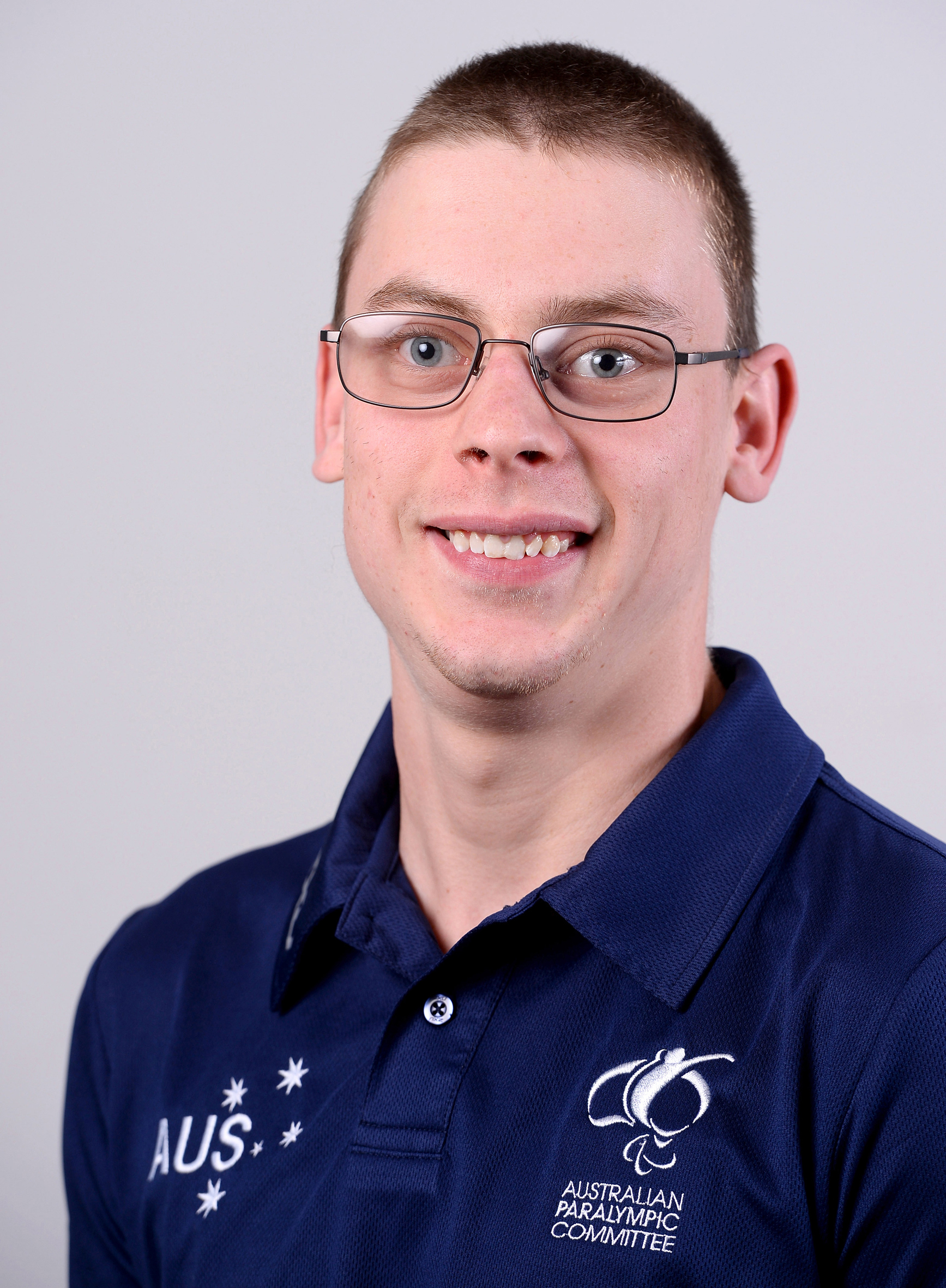
- 2016 Australian Paralympic team portrait

Personal information
- Full name: Timothy Malcolm Disken
- Nickname: "Disko"
- Nationality: Australian
- Born: 3 November 1996 (age 29) Melbourne, Australia
- Home town: Canberra, Australian Capital Territory
- Years active: 2014–
- Height: 1.72 m (5 ft 8 in)
- Spouse: Hannah Disken

Sport
- Country: Australia
- Sport: Paralympic swimming
- Disability: Cerebral palsy
- Disability class: S9
- Event(s): Breaststroke; Freestyle; Medley
- Club: PLC Aquatic
- Coached by: Damien Gogoll
Medal record
Men's Swimming
Representing Australia
Paralympic Games
Gold medal – first place	2016 Rio de Janeiro	100m freestyle S9
Silver medal – second place	2016 Rio de Janeiro	50m freestyle S9
Silver medal – second place	2020 Tokyo	4×100 m medley 34 pts
Bronze medal – third place	2016 Rio de Janeiro	200m individual medley SM9
World Para Swimming Championships
Bronze medal – third place	2015 Glasgow	4x100m freestyle S9
Bronze medal – third place	2019 London	4x100m freestyle 34 points
Commonwealth Games
Gold medal – first place	2018 Gold Coast	100m freestyle S9
Gold medal – first place	2018 Gold Coast	100m breaststroke SB7

Timothy Malcolm Disken, OAM (born 3 November 1996) is an Australian paralympic swimmer. He represented Australia at the 2015 IPC Swimming World Championships and won bronze in the men's 4 × 100 m freestyle relay. At the 2016 Rio Paralympics, he won a gold medal in the men's 100m freestyle S9, a silver medal in the men's S9 50m freestyle and a bronze medal in the men's 200m individual medley SM9. He also competed at the 2020 Summer Paralympics.

== Personal ==
Disken was born in Melbourne, Victoria, on 3 November 1996 and has cerebral palsy. He has an older brother Jeff who played water polo at a national level in Australia. When not competing Disken enjoys producing house music. Disken also likes to play piano and learned the piano for 12 years.

== Sporting career ==
Disken began participating in swimming aged 4, as a form of therapy for his cerebral palsy and started to compete in the sport at age 10. He was selected to attend a development camp, along with other swimmers who were seen as having potential ahead of the 2016 Paralympics.

In 2014, Disken then went on to win gold in the 50 LC backstroke event at the 2014 Australian Swimming Championships in Brisbane. He made his senior international debut at the 2014 Para Pan Pacific Championships in Pasadena CA Where he won bronze in the Men's S9 400m freestyle and gold in the Men 100 LC Meter breaststroke.

In 2015, Disken represented Australia at the IPC Swimming World Championships, winning bronze in the men's 4 × 100 m freestyle relay with 34 points. He finished 5th in the Men's 100m Breaststroke SB8, 4th in the Men's 50m Freestyle S9, sixth in the Men's 400m Freestyle S9, seventh in the Men's 200m Individual Medley SM9 and fourth in the Men's 4 × 100 m Medley Relay 34 Points.

At the 2016 Rio Paralympics, he won the gold medal in the Men's 100m Freestyle S9, silver medal in the Men's 50 m Freestyle and the bronze medal in the Men's 200m Individual Medley SM9. Disken's also competed in the Men's 4 × 100 m Freestyle and finished fifth.

In October 2017 Disken required emergency brain surgery while competing for Australia in Toronto, Canada. He has shunted hydrocephalus and the shunt broke, leaving him unconscious within hours. He fought back after his recovery and represented Australia at the 2018 Gold Coast Commonwealth Games where he won the gold medal in S9 100m freestyle and Gold in SB8 100m breaststroke.(13)

At the 2019 World Para Swimming Championships in London, he won bronze medal in Men's 4 × 100 m Freestyle (34 points), finished fourth in the Men's 4 × 100 m Medley (34 points) and fifth in the Men's 100 Freestyle (S9).

At the 2020 Tokyo Paralympics, Disken qualified for both the Men's 50 m freestyle S9 and Men's 100 m breaststroke SB8 finals. He finished seventh in both events. In the Men's 4x100m Medley 34 pts, he swam together with Ben Popham, Timothy Hodge, and William Martin. His team won the silver medal in a time of 4:07.70, just over a second behind the winners, RPC, who set a new world record.

He was selected to compete at the 2022 Birmingham Commonwealth Games.

Disken is coached by Yuriy Vdovychenko at the National Training Centre in Canberra.

== Recognition ==
- In 2013 and 2014 Disken was awarded the junior sports star of the year by the Waverley Leader.
- In 2015, Disken was awarded the Presidents Trophy at the Swimming Victoria Annual Awards night for his achievements at World Championships.
- In 2016 he was awarded Multi Class Swimmer of the Year at the Swimming Victoria Annual Awards night.
- In 2016, Glenallen School named its swimming pool Tim Disken Pool as a result of his performances at the Rio Paralympics.
- In 2017 he was awarded the Medal of the Order of Australia.
