= Lewis White (swimmer) =

British Paralympic swimmer

Personal information
- Nationality: English/British
- Born: 17 April 2000 (age 26) Norwich
- Height: 1.86 m (6 ft 1 in)
- Weight: 91 kg (201 lb)

Sport
- Sport: Swimming
- Strokes: Freestyle
- Club: City of Derby, City of Manchester Aquatics
- Coach: Melanie Marshall, Amanda Bell, Mark Rose
Medal record
Men's para swimming
Representing Great Britain
Paralympic Games
| Bronze medal – third place | 2016 Rio de Janeiro | 400m freestyle S9 |
European Championships
| Silver medal – second place | 2016 Funchal | 100m freestyle S9 |
| Silver medal – second place | 2016 Funchal | 4x100 m freestyle relay – 34pts |
Representing England
Commonwealth Games
| Silver medal – second place | 2018 Gold Coast | 100m freestyle S9 |
2018 Dublin European Championships
| Silver medal – second place | 2018 Dublin | 100m freestyle S9 |
| Silver medal – second place | 2018 Dublin | 400m freestyle S9 |

Lewis White (born 17 April 2000) is a retired Paralympic British swimmer who competed as a S9 classification swimmer, mainly in freestyle events. He holds multiple British records, winning 6 senior international medals in his career. Whilst training at City of Derby, under the tutelage of Mel Marshall, he won 3 international medals. Firstly, 2 Silvers at the Funchal European Championships followed by a Bronze at the Rio 2016 Paralympic Games. This was followed 2 years later, now coached by Amanda Bell, with another 2 Silver Medals at the Dublin European Championships, rounding out the season with another silver medal, this time at the 2018 Australia Commonwealth Games. All medals came in the 100m or 400m freestyle. Lewis then moved to City of Manchester Aquatics, qualifying for one last European Championships though ultimately retiring before this event.

He remains British record holder in multiple freestyle events (long course and short course) as well as a 20+ time British champion with the first national title won at age 12. He retired in early 2020.

== Personal history ==
White was born in Norwich, England, in April 2000 and grew up in Lowestoft before moving to Derby. He was born without a right hand.
