= Brendan Hall =

Australian rugby league footballer

Personal information
- Full name: Brendan Robert Hall
- Born: 13 September 1966 (age 59) Canberra, A.C.T, Australia

Playing information
- Position: Five-eighth, Centre, Lock
Club
Years	Team	Pld	T	G	FG	P
1986–95	Eastern Suburbs	157	30	44	0	208

Brendan Hall (born 13 September 1966) is an Australian former professional rugby league footballer who played in the 1980s and 1990s. He mostly played five-eighth, but he also spent time playing lock and occasionally centre.

== Playing career ==
Hall was a Canberra junior, and an Australian schoolboys representative in 1984. In 1986, he moved to Sydney, joining the Arthur Beetson coached Eastern Suburbs Roosters. Early on in his career, he forged a reputation for being a tough, fearless, and hard hitting tackler, but later on he developed more of a pivotal role and predominantly played five eighth in the Roosters team, as well as occasionally being the team's goal-kicker. At the end of 1995, Hall decided to retire from playing rugby league. With 157 appearances, he is currently 20th on the Sydney Roosters' list for most career appearances.
