= Matthew Wylie =

British Paralympic swimmer

Matthew Wylie MBE
Personal information
- Nationality: British
- Born: 14 October 1996 (age 29)

Sport
- Sport: Swimming
- Strokes: Freestyle
- Club: City of Sunderland ASC
- Coach: Danny Thompson (club); Rob Greenwood (national)
Medal record
Men's swimming
Representing Great Britain
Paralympic Games
Gold medal – first place	2016 Rio de Janeiro	50m freestyle S9
European Championships
Gold medal – first place	2016 Funchal	50m freestyle S9
Bronze medal – third place	2016 Funchal	4x100 m freestyle relay – 34pts

Matthew James "Matt" Wylie (born 14 October 1996) is a British swimmer. Wylie, who has cerebral palsy, competes as a parasport athlete competing as a S9 classification swimmer competing mainly in freestyle events. In 2016 he took gold in the 50m freestyle at the IPC European Championships and was also selected for the Great Britain team at the 2016 Summer Paralympics in Rio.

== Personal history ==
Wylie was born in Sunderland, England in 1996. Wylie, who has cerebral palsy, underwent a series of operations between 2004 and 2007 after a tumour was discovered on his leg.

He was appointed a Member of the Order of the British Empire (MBE) in the 2017 New Year Honours.

== Swimming history ==
Wylie took up swimming following medical advice after his tumour operations. It was believed that regular swimming would help correct his different leg lengths and the way he walked. In 2014 he represented Great Britain at his first major international event, travelling to Eindhoven to take part in the 2014 IPC Swimming European Championships. He took part in three events: the 50m, 200m and 400m freestyle races. He reached the finals of the 50m and 400m events, finishing fourth, just outside the medals in the 400m.

Two years later he represented Britain at the 2016 IPC Swimming European Championships, this time in Funchal. He competed in three events, winning two medals. He took gold in the 50m freestyle, with a time of 25.85, and was part of the British men's team who took silver in the 4 × 100 m freestyle relay. Although the relay team finished third, the second spot was taken by Brazil, who were competing as part of the open tournament in the run up to the 2016 Summer Paralympics in Rio. That year he qualified for his first Summer Paralympics, named as part of the Great Britain team to compete at Rio, where he won gold in the Men's 50m Freestyle S9 competition.
