= Alia Issa =

Paralympic athlete

- Born: 4 January 2001 (age 25); Greece
- Known for: member of the Refugee Paralympic Team at the 2020 Summer Paralympics

Alia Issa (born 4 January 2001) is one of the six refugees in the Refugee Paralympic Team at the 2020 Summer Paralympics who competed at the delayed Tokyo Paralympics. Issa is based in Athens. She was the first woman parathlete to represent refugees when she competed in the club throw. The day before the opening ceremony it was decided that there would be two flag carriers and that they would be Issa and Abbas Karimi. Issa came eighth in the club throw.

== Life ==
The Refugee Paralympic team was the first to enter the Opening Ceremony on 24 August 2021

Issa was born in Greece in 2001. Her father, Mohament Issa, and her mother, Fatima Najjar, were refugees from Syria. Her father had arrived first in Greece where he worked as a tailor. After four years, he had sufficient funds to pay for Issa's mother and their children to join him in 2000. In the following year, Issa was born. When she was four years old, she became ill with an infection that caused brain damage, resulting in physical and intellectual impairments.

As she was the daughter of refugees, she has no right to be a Greek citizen. Therefore, she cannot compete for the country where she was born and was a victim of discrimination at primary school, but she knew that her father had ambitions for her and wanted her to be a doctor. Her secondary school was reserved for people with disabilities so the bullying and teasing ended. It was at this school that she discovered physical education. One of the first sports she tried was boccia, but the coach noticed her strength and had her try throwing things. Issa became a regular at the Tyrtaios Sports Club for the disabled. She is unusual in her status as a female athlete; a scheme in Greece to encourage disabled athletes has attracted fifty men but only a few women like Issa.

When Issa was sixteen, her father died in Norway where he had gone to try to recover from cancer. Issa's elder sister was married and living in Norway. In time, the whole family returned to Greece as they could not stay in Norway. In Greece the family officially became refugees, but her can't compete at the Greece team.

Issa competes in the club throw, an event for athletes who are unable to compete in discus or javelin throws. Issa placed fourth in the Women's club throw at the 2021 World Para Athletics European Championships in Bydgoszcz, Poland. She has said that playing sport makes her feel stronger and has increased her self-esteem: “I would like to tell people that if they have a disabled child like me, don't keep it hidden at home. Encourage him to play sports."

In June 2021, Issa was called up by the International Paralympic Committee to compete with five other athletes within the Refugee Paralympic Team to represent refugees at the 2020 Summer Paralympics in Tokyo. Her name was announced by British actress and UNHCR Goodwill Ambassador Gugu Mbatha-Raw who said, "You'll be representing refugee women all over the world." The team was led by the Chef de Mission Ileana Rodriguez who was previously a parathlete swimmer for the United States in 2012. The other five included Ibrahim Al Hussein who is also from Syria and also lives in Athens. Issa became the first woman to compete as a member of the Refugee Paralympic Team. She was also the first woman refugee athlete to compete in the Paralympics. The day before the Tokyo opening ceremony it was decided that there would be two flag carriers, Issa and swimmer Abbas Karimi.

Issa came eighth in the F32 Club Throw in Tokyo. Roza Kozakowska of Poland won the gold medal and broke the World Record with a throw result of 28.74m; the Ukrainian Anastasiia Moskalenko won silver and Mounia Gasmi of Algeria bronze.
