= Ruan Jingsong =

Chinese Paralympic swimmer

Personal information
- Born: 26 March 1997 (age 29) Kunming, China

Sport
- Country: China
- Sport: Paralympic swimming
- Disability class: S5
Medal record
Paralympic swimming
Representing China
Paralympic Games
| Silver medal – second place | 2020 Tokyo | 50m backstroke S5 |

Ruan Jingsong (阮靖淞; born 26 March 1997) is a Chinese swimmer.

He represented China at the 2020 Summer Paralympics in Tokyo, where he won a silver medal in the men's 50m Backstroke event.
