= Refugee Paralympic Team at the 2020 Summer Paralympics =

- Flag of the International Paralympic Committee
- IPC code: RPT
- NPC: Refugee Paralympic Team

in Tokyo, Japan
- Competitors: 6 in 4 sports
- Flag bearers: Alia Issa, Abbas Karimi
- Medals: Gold 0 Silver 0 Bronze 0 Total 0

Summer Paralympics appearances (overview)
- 2020; 2024

Other related appearances
- Individual Paralympic Athletes (2016)

The Refugee Paralympic Team, previously the Independent Paralympic Athletes Team, competed at the 2020 Summer Paralympics in Tokyo, Japan, from 24 August to 5 September 2021. The team consisted of six refugee and asylee Paralympic athletes who represent the estimated 82 million refugees in the world. The formation of the team and its six athletes was announced on 30 June 2021 in a joint statement by the IPC and UNHCR. The team had made its debut at the previous edition of the Paralympics that consisted of just two athletes. That team was considered coordinated and was referred to as "the first". The team was the first to enter the Japan National Stadium during the Parade of Nations at the opening ceremony.

== Representation ==
The team do not represent any particular country; they represent the estimated 82 million people around the world who are refugees. The UNHCR estimates that 12 million of the 82 million refugees have disabilities. The team was welcomed by the UN High Commissioner for Refugees Filippo Grandi.

== Participation ==
The team was announced on 30 June 2021 by the International Paralympic Committee. American swimmer Ileana Rodriguez - herself a refugee - was chosen to lead the Refugee Paralympic Team as the chef de mission. Rodriguez was supposed to have the honour of carrying the flag in the opening ceremony's parade of nations but it was actually carried by Karimi and Issa. Rodriguez noted that it was appropriate that refugees should be represented at the Paralympics as they had been founded by Ludwig Guttmann who was himself a refugee.

Athlete	Country of origin	Host NPC	Sport	Event
Shahrad Nasajpour	Iran	United States	Para athletics	Men's Discus F37
Alia Issa	Syria	Greece	Para athletics	Women's Club throw F32
Anas Al Khalifa	Syria	Germany	Para canoe	Men's Va'a Single 200m - KL2; Men's Va'a Single 200m - VL2
Abbas Karimi	Afghanistan	United States	Para swimming	Men's 50m backstroke S5; Men's 50m backstroke S5
Ibrahim Al Hussein	Syria	Greece	Para swimming	Men's 50m freestyle S9; Men's 100m breaststroke SB8
Parfait Hakizimana	Burundi	Rwanda	Para taekwondo	Men's K44 -61 kg

All athletes are new to the Paralympics except Ibrahim Al Hussein and Shahrad Nasajpour who competed in 2016.

== Number of competitors by event ==
The following lists the number of competitors by event and gender.

Sport	Men	Women	Total
Athletics	1	1	2
Paracanoeing	1	0	1
Swimming	2	0	2
Taekwondo	1	0	1
Total	5	1	6

== Athletics ==
Athlete	Event	Result	Rank
Alia Issa	Women's club throw F32	16.33	8
Shahrad Nasajpour	Men's Discus throw F37	42.25	8

== Paracanoeing ==
Athlete	Event	Heats		Semi-final		Final	
Athlete	Event	Time	Rank	Time	Rank	Time	Rank
Anas Al Khalifa	Men's Kayak KL1	57.010	6 SF	53.654	5 FB	54.265	9
Anas Al Khalifa	Men's Va'a VL2	1:04.658	6 SF	1:01.467	9	did not advance	

== Swimming ==
Athlete	Event	Heats		Final	
Athlete	Event	Time	Rank	Time	Rank
Ibrahim Al Hussein	Men's 50 m freestyle S9	30.27	23	Did not advance	
Ibrahim Al Hussein	Men's 100 m breaststroke SB8	DSQ		Did not advance	
Abbas Karimi	Men's 50 m butterfly S5	36.36	5 Q	38.16	8
Abbas Karimi	Men's 50 m backstroke S5	46.48	15	Did not advance	

== Taekwondo ==
Athlete	Event	Round of 16	Quarterfinals	Repechage 1	Semifinals	Repechage 2	Final / BM	
Athlete	Event	Opposition Result	Opposition Result	Opposition Result	Opposition Result	Opposition Result	Opposition Result	Rank
Parfait Hakizimana	Men's –61 kg	Torquato (BRA); L 4–27	Did not advance	Bozteke (TUR); L WD	Did not advance			

== Sponsorship ==
The team is supported by the IPC organizationally, but financially they are sponsored by AirBNB. AirBNB cover the costs of the team and this allows the athletes to concentrate on their training. AirBNB have a new department to support the team and they run an on-line forum where the athletes talk about their lives. ASICS are supplying the team's outfits as this adds to their sense of identity. This is particularly important as each of them cannot use the flags of the nation where they were born. UNHCR also assist and one of the team's athletes, Abbas Karimi, has been made a UNHCR "High-Profile Supporter".
