= 2020 Summer Paralympics opening ceremony =

Opening ceremony of the 2020 Summer Paralympics

- Part of 2020 Summer Paralympics
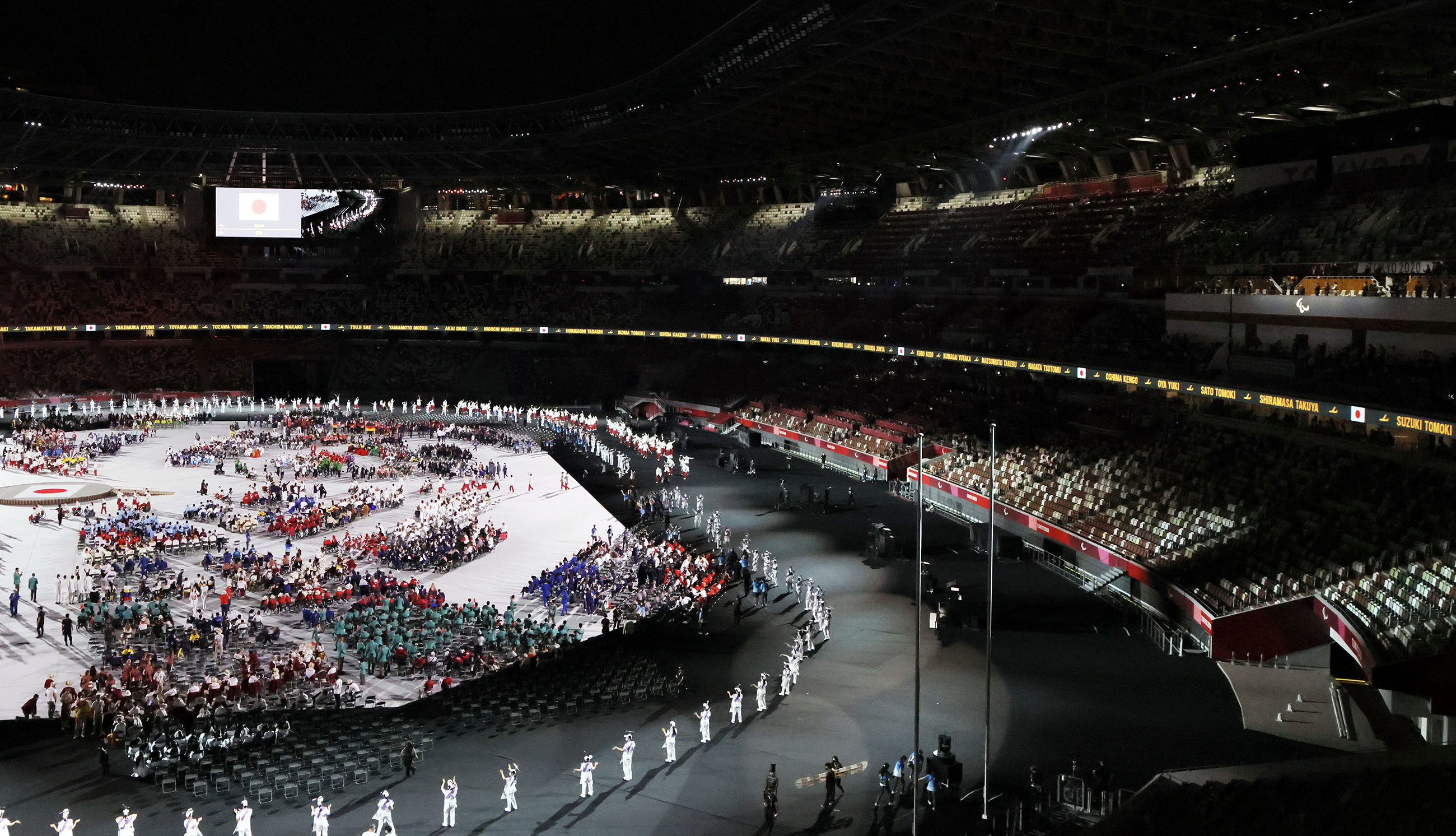
- Opening Ceremony, with Team Japan in the Parade of Nations
- Date: 24 August 2021; 4 years ago
- Time: 20:00 – 22:54 JST (UTC+9)
- Venue: Olympic Stadium
- Location: Tokyo, Japan
- Theme: "Moving Forward: We Have Wings"
- Filmed by: Olympic Broadcasting Services (OBS)
- Footage: The ceremony on the IPC YouTube channel on YouTube

The 2020 Summer Paralympics opening ceremony took place on 24 August 2021 at the Olympic Stadium in Tokyo, Japan. The theme of the opening ceremony was "Moving Forward: We Have Wings" and thus surrounded around the theme of aviation, airplanes, airports, and everything that involved air travel.

== Weather conditions ==
- 20:00 temperature 28.1 °C (82.6 °F) humidity 69%
- 23:00 temperature 26.8 °C (80.2 °F) humidity 80%
- At the observation point, it rained at each hour of 20:00, 22:00, and 23:00 to the extent that an hourly rainfall of 0 (mm) was recorded.

== Venue ==
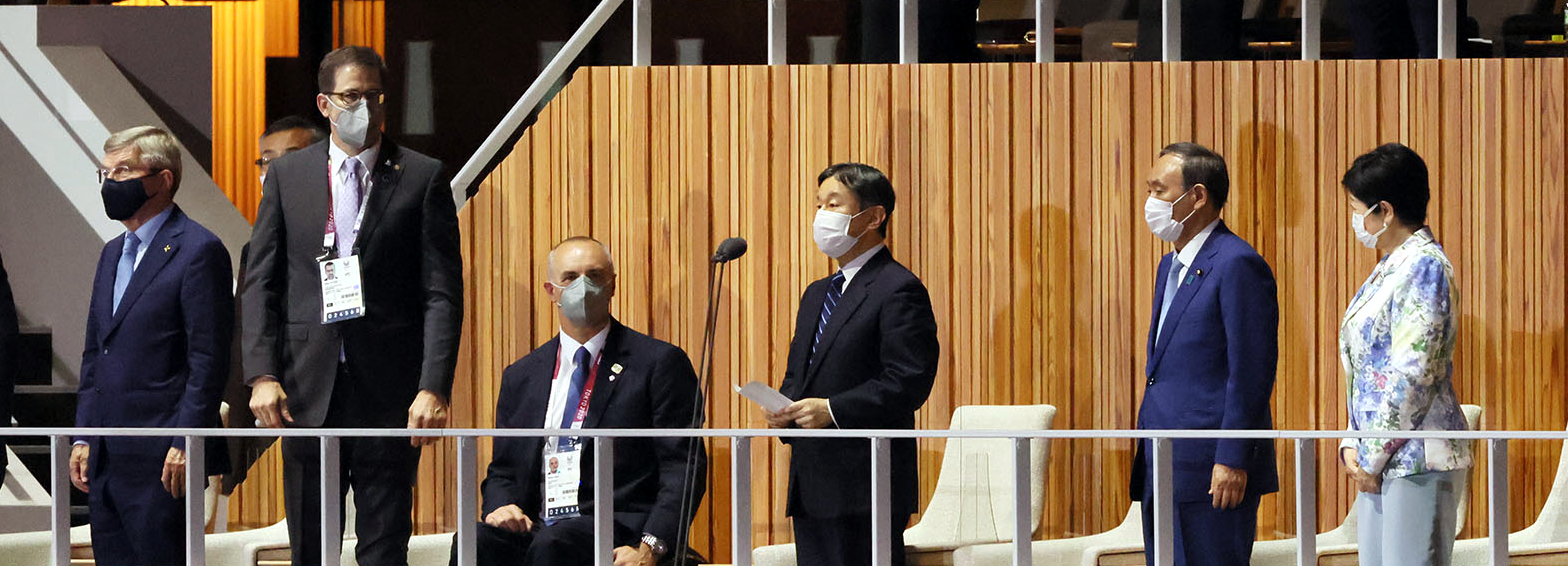
Opening declaration by Emperor Naruhito (at Japan National Stadium on 24 August 2021)

The Japan National Stadium, also referred to as the Olympic Stadium, served as the main stadium for the opening ceremony. The stadium will also serve as the main stadium for the closing ceremony, and the athletics/track and field events.

== Parade of nations ==
In the announcement of the Refugee Paralympic Team, it was stated that the team would enter first in the parade of nations. The rest of the countries entered in the Japanese Gojūon alphabetical order, with the last three teams being the United States, France, and Japan as the current host of the Paralympics as the final team and the next two hosts being Los Angeles 2028 and Paris 2024, so the United States and France entered as the final two teams before the Japanese team. Unlike the Olympics, Greece does not enter at the start of the parade, but instead follows the regular alphabetical order. After the parade of nations, there is a welcome greeting to the Para Airport.

== Performers ==
Japanese pianist Nobuyuki Tsujii was among the musicians who participated in the opening ceremony, although not in person. A recording of a composition by him ("House of Wind"), performed with an orchestra, was played while the flag of Japan was carried on stage. 13 year old Yui Wago performed the role of the 'Little One-Winged Plane'.

The announcers at all ceremonies were Mai Shoji (English) and Hiroyuki Sekino (Japanese).

== Dignitaries in attendance ==
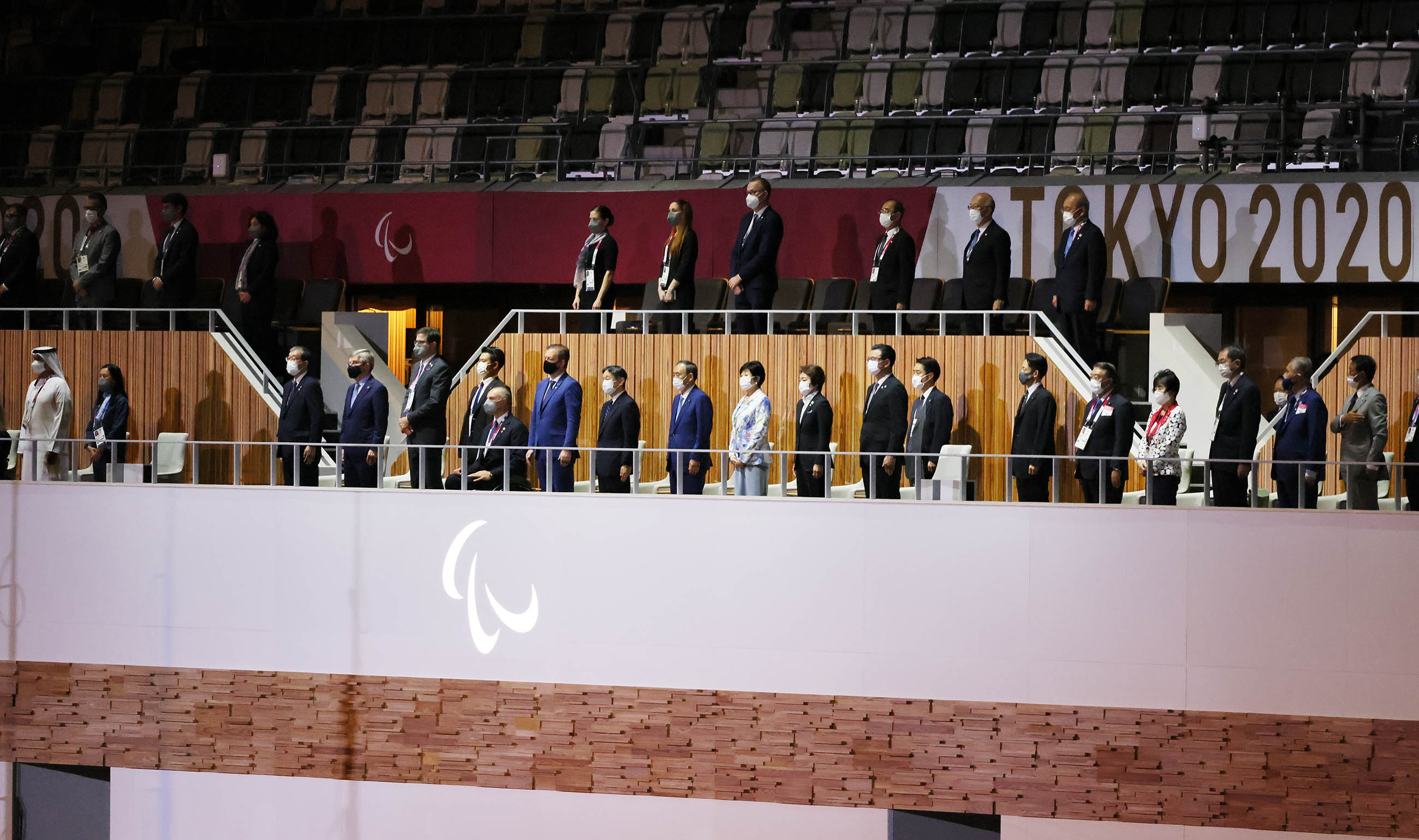
Dignitaries (at Japan National Stadium on 24 August 2021)

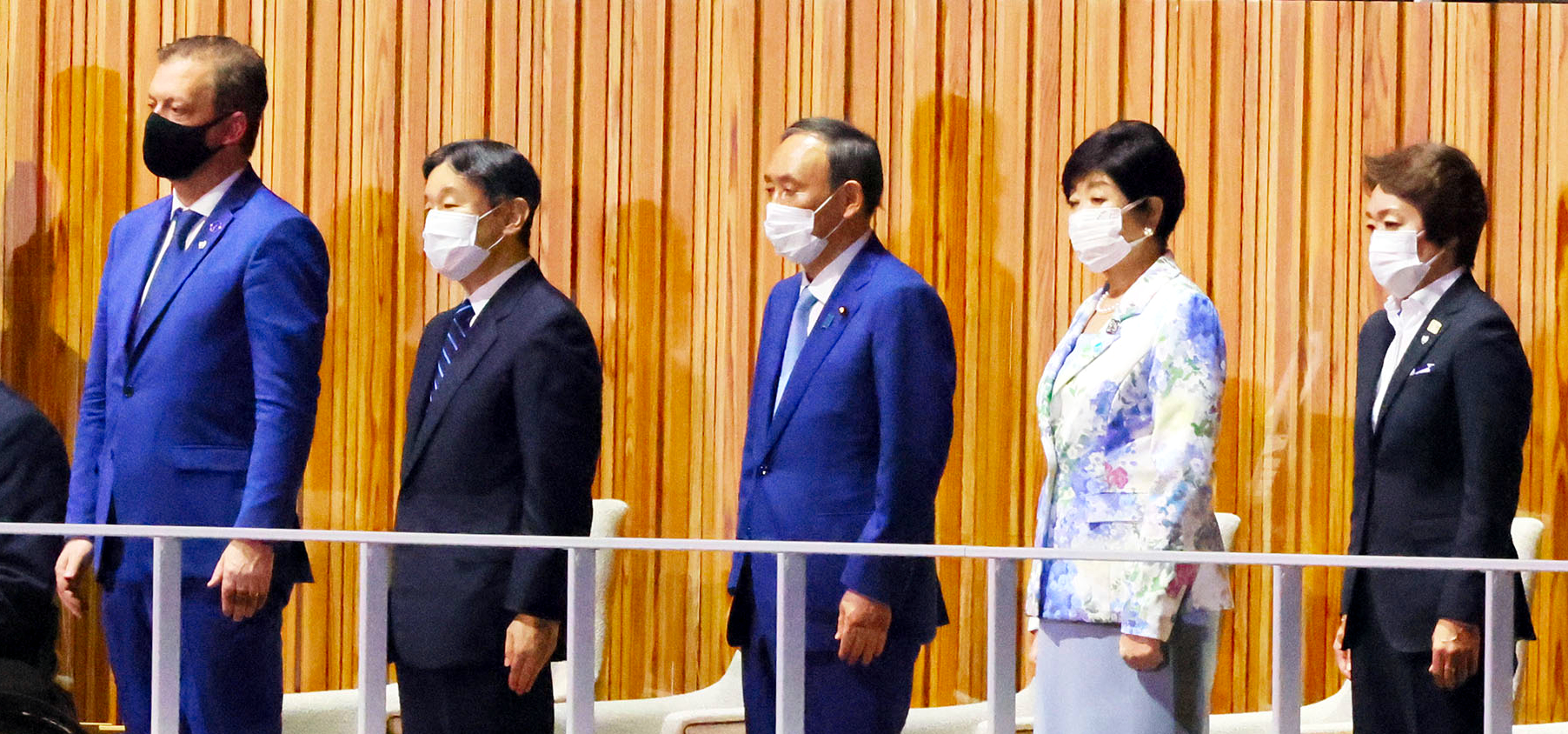
Andrew Parsons, Emperor Naruhito, Yoshihide Suga, Yuriko Koike and Seiko Hashimoto (at Japan National Stadium on 24 August 2021)

=== Host country dignitaries ===
- Japan –
  - Emperor Naruhito
  - Prime Minister Yoshihide Suga
  - Tokyo governor Yuriko Koike
  - Minister of State for the Tokyo Olympic and Paralympic Games Tamayo Marukawa
  - Chief Cabinet Secretary of Japan Katsunobu Katō

=== Dignitaries from international organizations ===
- International Paralympic Committee – President Andrew Parsons
- International Olympic Committee – President Thomas Bach

=== Dignitaries from abroad ===
- Colombia – Presidential Advisor for the Participation of Persons with Disabilities Jairo Clopatofsky
- South Korea – Korean Paralympic Committee president Lee Myung-ho
- United States – Second Gentleman Doug Emhoff

== Anthems ==
- National anthem of Japan – Hirari Sato
- (International Paralympic Committee) Paralympic Hymn

== Ceremony key team ==
- Tomoyuki Tanaka, musical director
- Kei Shibata
- Kentarō Kobayashi, Opening Ceremony Director (Note: Fired by TOCOG due to insensitive jokes and bullying allegations, although the committee kept his program intact.)
- Mansai Nomura, adviser
- Yuichi Kodama, film director
- Akihiro Fukube
- Akihiro Hamabe
- Hiroshi Nakamura, assistant musical director
- Iguchi
- Junji Kojima, film director
- Keiji Wakabayashi
- Koichiro Tsujikawa, film director
- Marco Balich, senior adviser to the executive producer
- Marihiko Hara, composer
- Masayuki Kagei, composer
- Nami Tomizawa, set designer
- Noboru Tomizawa
- Piera Shepperd, senior adviser to the executive producer
- Seigen Tokuzawa, composer
- Shintaro Hirahara, director of choreography
- Takayuki Hioki, executive producer
- Takayuki Suzuki
- Takuji Higuchi, executive writer
- Toshihiko Sakura
- Tugihisa Tanaka
- Yohei Taneda, scenographer

Announcers

- Mai Shoji (English)
- Hiroyuki Sekino (Japanese)

Commentator by OBS

== See also ==
- 2020 Summer Olympics opening ceremony
- 2020 Summer Olympics closing ceremony
- 2020 Summer Paralympics closing ceremony
