= Ibrahim Al Hussein =

Syrian Paralympic swimmer (born 1988)

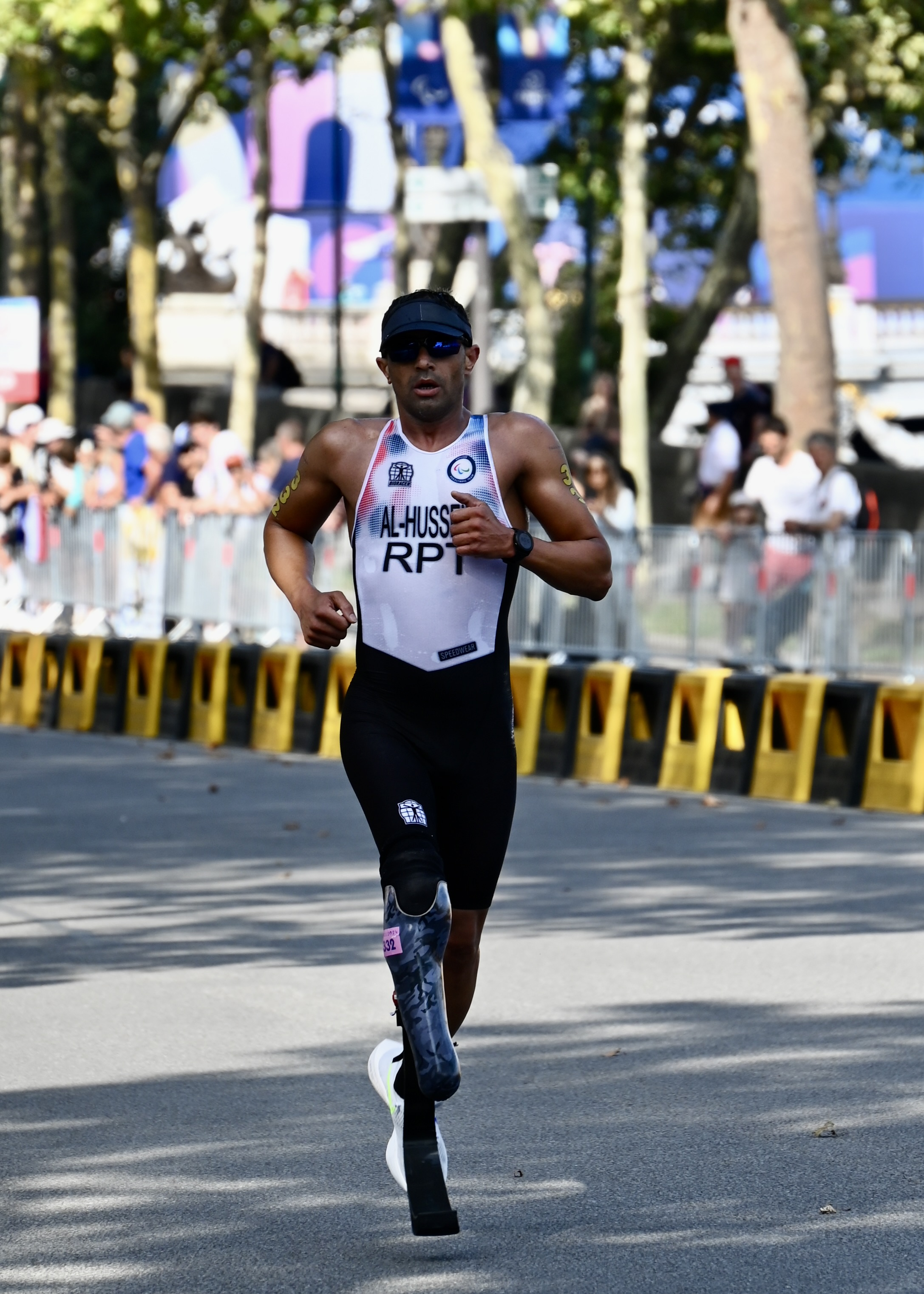
- Al Hussein at the 2024 Summer Paralympics

Personal information
- Nationality: Syrian
- Born: 23 September 1988 (age 38)

Sport
- Country: Greece
- Sport: Para triathlon, Paralympic swimming
- Disability class: S9 (swimming), PTS3 (triathlon)
- Events: 50 m, 100 m freestyle,
- Team: Refugee Paralympic Team
- Coached by: Vassilios Krommydas

Achievements and titles
- Paralympic finals: 2016, 2020, 2024

Ibrahim Al Hussein (born 23 September 1988) is a Syrian Paralympic athlete who represented the Refugee Paralympic Team at the Paralympic Games in Rio, Tokyo and Paris. He is a co-recipient of the 2016 Whang Youn Dai Achievement Award and resides in Greece.

== Career ==
He competed in the S9 50 m and 100 m freestyle events and served as a flag bearer at the 2016 Summer Paralympics Parade of Nations.

In June 2021, Ibrahim Al Hussein was chosen with four men and a woman to represent refugees at the 2020 Summer Paralympics in Tokyo. The six were led by the Chief of Mission Ileana Rodriguez who was previously a parathlete swimmer for the US in 2012. The other five were the Syrian refugee club thrower Alia Issa who also lives in Athens, the Burundian refugee Parfait Hakizimana, the American-based Afghan refugee swimmer Abbas Karimi, the German-based Syrian refugee canoeist Anas Al Khalifa, and American based Iranian refugee discus thrower Shahrad Nasajpour.

At the Paris 2024 Paralympics, he competed in Para triathlon and finished in the sixth place.

In October 2023, he finished sixth at the World Triathlon Para Championships in Spain, and fifth at the 2024 World Triathlon Para Championships in Málaga, Spain.
