= Abbas Karimi =

Afghan-born American swimmer (born 1997)

Personal information
- Full name: Mohammad Abbas Karimi
- Born: 1997 (age 28–29) Kabul, Afghanistan

Sport
- Sport: Swimming
- Strokes: Backstroke; Butterfly; Freestyle
- Classifications: S5
Medal record
Representing Refugee Team
World Para Swimming Championships
Silver medal – second place	2017 Mexico City	50m butterfly S5
Representing the United States
Paralympic Games
Silver medal – second place	2024 Paris	mixed 4×50 m freestyle relay 20 pts
Silver medal – second place	2024 Paris	mixed 4×50 m medley relay 20pts
World Para Swimming Championships
Gold medal – first place	2022 Madeira	Medley relay
Parapan American Games
Bronze medal – third place	2023 Santiago	50m freestyle S5

Mohammad Abbas Karimi (Dari: محمد عباس کریمی; born 1997) is a swimmer, who came second in the S5 50 meter butterfly event at the 2017 World Para Swimming Championships, making him the first refugee athlete to win a medal at that competition. He came eighth in the 50 meter butterfly S5 event for the Refugee Paralympic Team at the 2020 Summer Paralympics.

In 2021, Karimi obtained US citizenship and started to compete for the USA team. He was part of the US team that won the medley relay event at the 2022 World Para Swimming Championships. He has won national championship events in Afghanistan, Turkey and the US. Karimi competed for the US team at the 2024 Summer Paralympics, and was part of the US team that came second in the Mixed 4×50 m freestyle relay 20 pts event.

== Personal life ==
Karimi was born in Kabul, Afghanistan, and had no arms from birth. His family is of Hazara descent, and his father died in 2019. One of his brothers lives in Australia, and Karimi did not see him from 2013 until 2021. After the 2021 Taliban offensive, Karimi's family relocated from Afghanistan to Pakistan.

At the age of 16, Karimi fled Afghanistan, to escape the Taliban. In 2013, he arrived at a refugee camp in Turkey, having traveled through Iran and the Zagros Mountains. He lived in four different refugee camps in Turkey. In 2016, Karimi moved to Portland, Oregon, US, after being assisted by an American teacher and the United Nations High Commissioner for Refugees with his documentation for resettlement in the US. In 2019, he moved to Fort Lauderdale, Florida. In 2022, Karimi became a naturalized American citizen.

== Career ==
At the age of 12, Karimi took up kickboxing. Aged 13, he took up swimming. His first competitive competition was an Afghan national championships, which he won. Whilst in Turkey, he won two national championships, and a total of 15 medals. He was unable to participate in international tournaments whilst in Turkish refugee camps, as he did not have the correct documentation to travel.

At the 2017 World Para Swimming Championships, Karimi won a silver medal in the S5 50 meter butterfly event. He was the first refugee athlete to win a medal at a World Para Swimming Championships. At the Championships, he also finished sixth in the S5 backstroke event. In 2018, he won the 50 meter freestyle event at the U.S. Paralympics Swimming Para National Championships. At the 2019 World Para Swimming Championships, he came sixth in the 50 meter butterfly event. During the COVID-19 pandemic, he was unable to swim for several months, as all swimming pools were closed.

In 2021, Karimi competed in the US Paralympic Trials in the 50 meter butterfly, backstroke and freestyle events. In April 2021, he won a World Para Swimming Series S5 50 meter butterfly event in Texas, US. In June, he was included in the Refugee Paralympic Team for the delayed 2020 Summer Paralympics. Karimi and Alia Issa were the Refugee Paralympic Team's flag bearers at the Games' opening ceremony. He competed in the 50 meter butterfly S5 event, where he qualified for the final, and finished eighth overall. He also competed in the 50 meter backstroke S5 event, where he finished last in his heat. Karimi won the 2021 USMS Long Course National Championship 200 meter backstroke and 200 meter butterfly events. In 2022, he won the 50 meters butterfly event at the Indianapolis World Series.

At the 2022 World Para Swimming Championships, Karimi competed for the US team. He finished ninth in the heats of the 50 meter freestyle event. He also finished fourth overall in the 50 meter backstroke and 50 meter butterfly events. He was part of the US team that won the medley relay in a world record time, alongside Elizabeth Marks, Rudy Garcia-Tolson and Leanne Smith. He finished third in the 50 metre freestyle S5 event at the 2023 Parapan American Games.

Karimi was selected for the US team for the 2024 Summer Paralympics. He was part of the American team who finished second in the mixed 4×50 m freestyle relay 20 pts.
