= Takuro Yamada =

Japanese Paralympic swimmer

Personal information
- Native name: 山田 拓朗
- Nationality: Japanese
- Born: 12 April 1991 (age 35) Sanda, Hyōgo, Japan
- Height: 176 cm (5 ft 9 in)

Sport
- Sport: Swimming
- Disability: Congenital left forearm deficiency
- Strokes: Freestyle, individual medley
- Club: NTT Docomo
Medal record
Men's para swimming
Representing Japan
Paralympic Games
Bronze medal – third place	2016 Rio de Janeiro	50 metre freestyle S9
World Championships
Bronze medal – third place	2006 Durban	100 m freestyle S9
Asian Para Games
Gold medal – first place	2010 Guangzhou	400m freestyle S9
Silver medal – second place	2010 Guangzhou	100m butterfly S9
Silver medal – second place	2010 Guangzhou	100m freestyle S9
Silver medal – second place	2010 Guangzhou	4×100m freestyle relay
Silver medal – second place	2010 Guangzhou	200m ind. medley SM9
Silver medal – second place	2010 Guangzhou	4×100m medley relay

Takuro Yamada (山田 拓朗, Yamada Takuro; born 12 April 1991) is a Japanese former Paralympic swimmer who competed mainly in freestyle and individual medley events. He represented Japan at five consecutive Paralympic Games from 2004 to 2020 and won a bronze medal in the men's 50 metre freestyle S9 at the 2016 Summer Paralympics.

== Early life and education ==
Yamada was born in Sanda, Hyōgo Prefecture, Japan, and later resided in Tokyo. He graduated from Hokusetu Sanda High School and the University of Tsukuba.

He was born with a congenital absence of his left forearm and began swimming at the age of three.

== Career ==
Yamada made his Paralympic debut at the 2004 Summer Paralympics at the age of 13.

At the 2016 Summer Paralympics in Rio de Janeiro, he competed in the 100 metre freestyle and 50 metre freestyle events. He won the bronze medal in the men's 50 metre freestyle S9.

He also won a bronze medal in the 100 metre freestyle S9 at the 2006 IPC Swimming World Championships in Durban.

Yamada continued competing through the 2020 Summer Paralympics in Tokyo. Persistent shoulder and lower back pain led him to announce his retirement in 2023. His final race took place on 18 September 2023 at the Japan Para Swimming Championships held at Yokohama International Pool.

== Classification ==
Yamada competed in the following classifications:

Stroke	Classification
Freestyle	S9
Backstroke	S9
Butterfly	S9
Breaststroke	SB8
Individual medley	SM9
