= Swimming at the 2020 Summer Paralympics – Men's 100 metre butterfly S11 =

Men's 100 metre butterfly S11 at the XVI Paralympic Games
- Venue: Tokyo Aquatics Centre
- Dates: 3 September 2021
- Competitors: 13 from 9 nations

Medalists
1st place, gold medalist(s)		Keiichi Kimura	Japan
2nd place, silver medalist(s)		Uchu Tomita	Japan
3rd place, bronze medalist(s)		Wendell Belarmino Pereira	Brazil

The men's 100 metre butterfly S11 event at the 2020 Paralympic Games took place on 3 September 2021, at the Tokyo Aquatics Centre.

== Heats ==
The swimmers with the top eight times, regardless of heat, advanced to the final.

Rank	Heat	Lane	Name	Nationality	Time	Notes
1	2	4	Keiichi Kimura	Japan	1:02.25	Q
2	1	4	Uchu Tomita	Japan	1:03.32	Q
3	2	5	Rogier Dorsman	Netherlands	1:05.64	Q
4	1	5	Wendell Belarmino Pereira	Brazil	1:06.59	Q
5	2	6	Matthew Cabraja	Canada	1:06.60	Q
6	1	6	Viktor Smyrnov	Ukraine	1:08.71	Q
7	2	3	Yang Bozun	China	1:10.13	Q
8	1	3	Hua Dongdong	China	1:10.71	Q
9	1	2	Leider Lemus	Colombia	1:12.19	
10	2	2	Mykhailo Serbin	Ukraine	1:13.46	
11	2	7	Már Gunnarsson	Iceland	1:14.86	
12	2	1	Marco Meneses	Portugal	1:21.25	
13	1	7	Matheus Rheine Correa de Souza	Brazil	1:24.69	

== Final ==
100m butterfly final
Rank	Lane	Name	Nationality	Time	Notes
1st place, gold medalist(s)	4	Keiichi Kimura	Japan	1.02.57	
2nd place, silver medalist(s)	5	Uchu Tomita	Japan	1.03.59	
3rd place, bronze medalist(s)	6	Wendell Belarmino Pereira	Brazil	1.05.20	
4	2	Rogier Dorsman	Netherlands	1.05.67	
5	2	Matthew Cabraja	Canada	1.05.97	
6	7	Viktor Smyrnov	Ukraine	1.06.85	
7	8	Hua Dongdong	China	1.09.16	
8	1	Yang Bozun	China	1.09.23	
