= Swimming at the 2020 Summer Paralympics – Men's 200 metre individual medley SM11 =

Men's 200 metre individual medley SM11 at the XVI Paralympic Games
- Venue: Tokyo Aquatics Centre
- Dates: 30 August 2021
- Competitors: 14 from 10 nations

Medalists
1st place, gold medalist(s)		Rogier Dorsman	Netherlands
2nd place, silver medalist(s)		Mykhailo Serbin	Ukraine
3rd place, bronze medalist(s)		Uchu Tomita	Japan

The men's 200 metre individual medley SM11 event at the 2020 Paralympic Games took place on 30 August 2021, at the Tokyo Aquatics Centre.

== Heats ==
The swimmers with the top eight times, regardless of heat, advanced to the final.

Rank	Heat	Lane	Name	Nationality	Time	Notes
1	2	4	Rogier Dorsman	Netherlands	2:20.75	Q, PR
2	2	6	Yang Bozun	China	2:32.05	Q
3	1	4	Keiichi Kimura	Japan	2:32.60	Q
4	1	5	Uchu Tomita	Japan	2:32.87	Q
5	1	5	Viktor Smyrnov	Ukraine	2:33.12	Q
6	1	3	Mykhailo Serbin	Ukraine	2:35.12	Q
7	2	3	Wendell Belarmino Pereira	Brazil	2:38.59	Q
8	1	2	Már Gunnarsson	Iceland	2:39.63	Q
9	2	2	José Ramón Cantero Elvira	Spain	2:39.72	
10	2	7	Hua Dongdong	China	2:39.97	
11	1	1	Oleksandr Artiukhov	Ukraine	2:45.93	
12	2	1	Miroslav Smrcka	Czech Republic	2:54.35	
	1	6	Hryhory Zudzilau	Belarus	DNS	
	1	7	Marco Meneses	Poland	DSQ	

== Final ==
200m individual medley final
Rank	Lane	Name	Nationality	Time	Notes
1st place, gold medalist(s)	4	Rogier Dorsman	Netherlands	2:19.02	WR
2nd place, silver medalist(s)	7	Mykhailo Serbin	Ukraine	2:27.97	
3rd place, bronze medalist(s)	6	Uchu Tomita	Japan	2:28.44	
4	2	Viktor Smyrnov	Ukraine	2:28.97	
5	3	Keiichi Kimura	Japan	2:29.87	
6	5	Yang Bozun	China	2:29.95	
7	1	Wendell Belarmino Pereira	Brazil	2:30.17	
8	8	Már Gunnarsson	Iceland	2:37.43	
