= Swimming at the 2020 Summer Paralympics – Men's 50 metre freestyle S11 =

Men's 50 metre freestyle S11 at the XVI Paralympic Games
- Venue: Tokyo Aquatics Centre
- Dates: 27 August 2021
- Competitors: 15 from 11 nations

Medalists
1st place, gold medalist(s)		Wendell Belarmino Pereira	Brazil
2nd place, silver medalist(s)		Hua Dongdong	China
3rd place, bronze medalist(s)		Edgaras Matakas	Lithuania

The men's 50 metre freestyle S11 event at the 2020 Paralympic Games took place on 27 August 2021, at the Tokyo Aquatics Centre.

== Heats ==
The swimmers with the top eight times, regardless of heat, advanced to the final.

Rank	Heat	Lane	Name	Nationality	Time	Notes
1	2	4	Edgaras Matakas	Lithuania	26.16	Q
2	1	4	Wendell Belarmino Pereira	Brazil	26.47	Q
3	2	5	Hua Dongdong	China	26.55	Q
4	1	6	Matheus Rheine Correa de Souza	Brazil	27.17	Q
5	1	5	Yang Bozun	China	27.19	Q
6	1	3	Mykhailo Serbin	Ukraine	27.44	Q
7	2	3	Wojciech Makowski	Poland	27.92	Q
8	1	7	Marco Meneses	Portugal	28.07	Q
9	2	6	Matthew Cabraja	Canada	28.13	
10	1	2	Viktor Smyrnov	Ukraine	28.31	
11	2	7	Ilnur Garipov	RPC	28.39	
12	2	8	Przemysław Drąg	Poland	29.02	
13	1	1	Már Gunnarsson	Iceland	29.30	
14	2	1	Oleksandr Artiukhov	Ukraine	30.29	
	2	2	Hryhory Zudzilau	Belarus	DNS	

== Final ==
50m freestyle final
Rank	Lane	Name	Nationality	Time	Notes
1st place, gold medalist(s)	5	Wendell Belarmino Pereira	Brazil	26.03	
2nd place, silver medalist(s)	3	Hua Dongdong	China	26.18	
3rd place, bronze medalist(s)	4	Edgaras Matakas	Lithuania	26.38	
4	2	Yang Bozun	China	26.98	
5	7	Mykhailo Serbin	Ukraine	27.18	
6	6	Matheus Rheine Correa de Souza	Brazil	27.26	
7	1	Wojciech Makowski	Poland	27.83	
8	8	Marco Meneses	Portugal	28.02	
