= Swimming at the 2020 Summer Paralympics – Men's 100 metre backstroke S11 =

Men's 100 metre backstroke S11 at the XVI Paralympic Games
- Venue: Tokyo Aquatics Centre
- Dates: 28 August 2021
- Competitors: 11 from 8 nations

Medalists
1st place, gold medalist(s)		Mykhailo Serbin	Ukraine
2nd place, silver medalist(s)		Viktor Smyrnov	Ukraine
3rd place, bronze medalist(s)		Yang Bozun	China

The Men's 100 metre backstroke S11 event at the 2020 Paralympic Games took place on 28 August 2021, at the Tokyo Aquatics Centre.

== Heats ==
The swimmers with the top eight times, regardless of heat, advanced to the final.

Rank	Heat	Lane	Name	Nationality	Time	Notes
1	1	2	Yang Bozun	China	1:10.14	Q
2	2	4	Rogier Dorsman	Netherlands	1:10.51	Q
3	1	5	Már Gunnarsson	Iceland	1:10.90	Q
4	2	5	Mykhailo Serbin	Ukraine	1:11.14	Q
5	1	3	Marco Meneses	Portugal	1:11.65	Q
6	1	4	Viktor Smyrnov	Ukraine	1:11.69	Q
7	2	3	Wojciech Makowski	Poland	1:12.93	Q
8	2	6	Oleksandr Artiukhov	Ukraine	1:13.78	Q
9	2	2	Matthew Cabraja	Canada	1:13.98	
10	2	7	Przemyslaw Drag	Poland	1:15.60	
11	1	6	Miroslav Smrcka	Czech Republic	1:15.93	

== Final ==
Rank	Lane	Name	Nationality	Time	Notes
1st place, gold medalist(s)	6	Mykhailo Serbin	Ukraine	1:08.63	
2nd place, silver medalist(s)	7	Viktor Smyrnov	Ukraine	1:09.36	
3rd place, bronze medalist(s)	4	Yang Bozun	China	1:09.62	
4	5	Rogier Dorsman	Netherlands	1:10.10	
5	3	Már Gunnarsson	Iceland	1:10.36	
6	1	Wojciech Makowski	Poland	1:10.55	
7	8	Oleksandr Artiukhov	Ukraine	1:11.83	
8	2	Marco Meneses	Portugal	1:12.68	
