= Iceland at the 1988 Summer Paralympics =

- IPC code: ISL
- NPC: National Paralympic Committee of Iceland
- Website: www.ifsport.is

in Seoul
- Competitors: 14
- Medals Ranked 31st: Gold 2 Silver 2 Bronze 7 Total 11

Summer Paralympics appearances (overview)
- 1980; 1984; 1988; 1992; 1996; 2000; 2004; 2008; 2012; 2016; 2020; 2024

Iceland competed at the 1988 Summer Paralympics in Seoul, South Korea. 14 competitors from Iceland won 11 medals including 2 gold, 2 silver and 7 bronze and finished 31st in the medal table.

== Medalists ==
Medal	Name	Sport	Event
Gold	Haukur Gunnarsson	Athletics	Men's 100m C7
Gold	Lilja Snorradóttir	Swimming	Women's 200m individual medley A2
Silver	Jónas Óskarson	Swimming	Men's 100m backstroke A2
Silver	Geir Sverrisson	Swimming	Men's 100m breaststroke A8
Bronze	Haukur Gunnarsson	Athletics	Men's 200m C7
Bronze	Haukur Gunnarsson	Athletics	Men's 400m C7
Bronze	Ólafur Eiríksson	Swimming	Men's 400m freestyle L5
Bronze	Ólafur Eiríksson	Swimming	Men's 100m butterfly L5
Bronze	Sóley Axelsdóttir	Swimming	Women's 100m freestyle 4
Bronze	Lilja Snorradóttir	Swimming	Women's 100m freestyle A2
Bronze	Lilja Snorradóttir	Swimming	Women's 100m backstroke A2

== See also ==
- Iceland at the Paralympics
- Iceland at the 1988 Summer Olympics
