= Iceland at the Paralympics =

- IPC code: ISL
- NPC: National Paralympic Committee of Iceland
- Website: www.ifsport.is
- Medals Ranked 46th: Gold 24 Silver 16 Bronze 41 Total 81

Summer appearances
- 1980; 1984; 1988; 1992; 1996; 2000; 2004; 2008; 2012; 2016; 2020; 2024

Winter appearances
- 1994; 1998–2006; 2010; 2014; 2018; 2022

Iceland made its Paralympic Games debut at the 1980 Summer Paralympics in Arnhem, where it fielded thirteen athletes, who won two medals (a gold and a silver). Since then, the country has competed in every edition of the Summer Paralympics.

Despite its climate, and despite having participated in every edition (bar one) of the Winter Olympics, Iceland has been a highly infrequent participant in the Winter Paralympic Games. It made its Winter Paralympics debut at the 1994 Winter Paralympics, sending just one representative, Svanur Ingvarsson in ice sledge speed racing. The country was then absent from the Winter Paralympics for sixteen years, before making its return at the 2010 Games in Vancouver - again with just one athlete, Erna Friðriksdóttir in alpine skiing.

Icelandic athletes have won a total of sixty-one Paralympic medals, all at the Summer Games: fourteen gold, thirteen silver and thirty-four bronze. This places Iceland in forty-seventh place on the all-time Paralympic Games medal table.

This medal table also includes the 22 medals (10 gold, 6 silvers and 6 bronze) won at the 1992 Summer Paralympics for Intellectually Disabled, held in Madrid, who also organized by then International Coordenation Committee (ICC) and same Organizing Committee (COOB'92) who made the gestion of the 1992 Summer Paralympics held in Barcelona and also part of same event. But the results are not on the International Paralympic Committee's (IPC) database.

== Medal tallies ==
=== Summer Paralympics ===
Event	Gold	Silver	Bronze	Total	Ranking
1980 Summer Paralympics	1	0	1	2	31st
1984 Summer Paralympics	0	2	8	10	36th
1988 Summer Paralympics	2	2	7	11	31st
1992 Summer Paralympics	13	8	18	39	13th
1996 Summer Paralympics	5	4	5	14	28th
2000 Summer Paralympics	2	0	2	4	41st
2004 Summer Paralympics	1	3	0	4	47th
2008 Summer Paralympics	0	0	0	0	—
2012 Summer Paralympics	1	0	0	1	52nd
2016 Summer Paralympics	0	0	0	0	—
2020 Summer Paralympics	0	0	0	0	—
2024 Summer Paralympics	0	0	0	0	—
Total	24	16	41	81	

== Medalists ==
Medal	Name	Games	Sport	Event
Gold	S. Karlsdóttir	(Netherlands) 1980 Arnhem	Swimming	Women's 50m breaststroke E1
Bronze	Jónas Óskarsson	(Netherlands) 1980 Arnhem	Weightlifting	Men's middleweight -75kg amputee
Silver	Jónas Óskarsson	(United Kingdom) / (United States) 1984 Stoke Mandeville / New York	Swimming	Men's 100m backstroke A2
Silver	Sigrún Pétursdóttir	(United Kingdom) / (United States) 1984 Stoke Mandeville / New York	Swimming	Women's 25m backstroke C3
Bronze	Haukur Gunnarsson	(United Kingdom) / (United States) 1984 Stoke Mandeville / New York	Athletics	Men's 200m C7
Bronze	Haukur Gunnarsson	(United Kingdom) / (United States) 1984 Stoke Mandeville / New York	Athletics	Men's 400m C7
Bronze	Sigrún Pétursdóttir	(United Kingdom) / (United States) 1984 Stoke Mandeville / New York	Swimming	Women's 25m freestyle C3
Bronze	A. Geirsdóttir	(United Kingdom) / (United States) 1984 Stoke Mandeville / New York	Swimming	Women's 50m breaststroke 3
Bronze	Sigrún Pétursdóttir	(United Kingdom) / (United States) 1984 Stoke Mandeville / New York	Swimming	Women's 50m freestyle C3
Bronze	E. Bergmann	(United Kingdom) / (United States) 1984 Stoke Mandeville / New York	Swimming	Women's 100m breaststroke 5
Bronze	Oddný Óttarsdóttir	(United Kingdom) / (United States) 1984 Stoke Mandeville / New York	Swimming	Women's 100m freestyle C3
Bronze	H. Gunnarsdóttir	(United Kingdom) / (United States) 1984 Stoke Mandeville / New York	Table tennis	Women's singles L3
Gold	Haukur Gunnarsson	(South Korea) 1988 Seoul	Athletics	Men's 100m C7
Gold	Lilja Snorradóttir	(South Korea) 1988 Seoul	Swimming	Women's 200m individual medley A2
Silver	Jónas Óskarsson	(South Korea) 1988 Seoul	Swimming	Men's 100m backstroke A2
Silver	Geir Sverrisson	(South Korea) 1988 Seoul	Swimming	Men's 100m breaststroke A8
Bronze	Haukur Gunnarsson	(South Korea) 1988 Seoul	Athletics	Men's 200m C7
Bronze	Haukur Gunnarsson	(South Korea) 1988 Seoul	Athletics	Men's 400m C7
Bronze	Ólafur Eiríksson	(South Korea) 1988 Seoul	Swimming	Men's 400m freestyle L5
Bronze	Ólafur Eiríksson	(South Korea) 1988 Seoul	Swimming	Men's 100m butterfly L5
Bronze	Sóley Axelsdóttir	(South Korea) 1988 Seoul	Swimming	Women's 100m freestyle 4
Bronze	Lilja Snorradóttir	(South Korea) 1988 Seoul	Swimming	Women's 100m freestyle A2
Bronze	Lilja Snorradóttir	(South Korea) 1988 Seoul	Swimming	Women's 100m backstroke A2
Gold	Geir Sverrisson	(Spain) 1992 Barcelona	Swimming	Men's 100m breaststroke SB9
Gold	Ólafur Eiríksson	(Spain) 1992 Barcelona	Swimming	Men's 100m butterfly S9
Gold	Ólafur Eiríksson	(Spain) 1992 Barcelona	Swimming	Men's 400m freestyle S9
Silver	Kristín Hákonardóttir	(Spain) 1992 Barcelona	Swimming	Women's 200m individual medley SM8
Silver	Lilja Snorradóttir	(Spain) 1992 Barcelona	Swimming	Women's 400m freestyle S9
Bronze	Geir Sverrisson	(Spain) 1992 Barcelona	Athletics	Men's 100m TS4
Bronze	Haukur Gunnarsson	(Spain) 1992 Barcelona	Athletics	Men's 200m C7
Bronze	Ólafur Eiríksson	(Spain) 1992 Barcelona	Swimming	Men's 100m freestyle S9
Bronze	Olafur Eiríksson	(Spain) 1992 Barcelona	Swimming	Men's 200m individual medley SM9
Bronze	Birkir Gunnarsson	(Spain) 1992 Barcelona	Swimming	Men's 400m freestyle B1
Bronze	Lilja Snorradóttir	(Spain) 1992 Barcelona	Swimming	Women's 50m freestyle S9
Bronze	Rut Sverrisdóttir	(Spain) 1992 Barcelona	Swimming	Women's 100m backstroke B3
Bronze	Kristín Hákonardóttir	(Spain) 1992 Barcelona	Swimming	Women's 100m backstroke S8
Bronze	Lilja Snorradóttir	(Spain) 1992 Barcelona	Swimming	Women's 100m backstroke S9
Bronze	Lilja Snorradóttir	(Spain) 1992 Barcelona	Swimming	Women's 100m butterfly S9
Bronze	Lilja Snorradóttir	(Spain) 1992 Barcelona	Swimming	Women's 100m freestyle S9
Bronze	Rut Sverrisdóttir	(Spain) 1992 Barcelona	Swimming	Women's 200m individual medley B3
Gold	Ólafur Eiríksson	(United States) 1996 Atlanta	Swimming	Men's 100m butterfly S9
Gold	Pálmar Guðmundsson	(United States) 1996 Atlanta	Swimming	Men's 200m freestyle S3
Gold	Kristín Hákonardóttir	(United States) 1996 Atlanta	Swimming	Women's 100m backstroke S7
Gold	Kristín Hakonardóttir	(United States) 1996 Atlanta	Swimming	Women's 100m breaststroke SB7
Gold	Kristín Hákonardóttir	(United States) 1996 Atlanta	Swimming	Women's 200m individual medley SM7
Silver	Geir Sverrisson	(United States) 1996 Atlanta	Athletics	Men's 100m T45-46
Silver	Geir Sverrisson	(United States) 1996 Atlanta	Athletics	Men's 200m T45-46
Silver	Geir Sverrisson	(United States) 1996 Atlanta	Athletics	Men's 400m T42-46
Silver	Pálmar Guðmundsson	(United States) 1996 Atlanta	Swimming	Men's 100m freestyle S3
Bronze	Ólafur Eiríksson	(United States) 1996 Atlanta	Swimming	Men's 200m individual medley SM9
Bronze	Birkir Gunnarsson	(United States) 1996 Atlanta	Swimming	Men's 100m backstroke B1
Bronze	Kristín Hákonardóttir	(United States) 1996 Atlanta	Swimming	Women's 100m freestyle S7
Bronze	Kristín Hákonardóttir	(United States) 1996 Atlanta	Swimming	Women's 50m freestyle MH
Gold	Kristín Hákonardóttir	(Australia) 2000 Sydney	Swimming	Women's 100m backstroke S7
Gold	Kristín Hákonardóttir	(Australia) 2000 Sydney	Swimming	Women's 100m breaststroke SB7
Bronze	Kristín Hákonardóttir	(Australia) 2000 Sydney	Swimming	Women's 100m freestyle S7
Bronze	Kristín Hákonardóttir	(Australia) 2000 Sydney	Swimming	Women's 200m individual medley SM7
Gold	Kristín Hákonardóttir	(Greece) 2004 Athens	Swimming	Women's 100m backstroke S7
Silver	Jón Halldórsson	(Greece) 2004 Athens	Athletics	Men's 100m T35
Silver	Jón Halldórsson	(Greece) 2004 Athens	Athletics	Men's 200m T35
Silver	Kristín Hákonardóttir	(Greece) 2004 Athens	Swimming	Women's 100m breaststroke SB7
Gold	Jón Margeir Sverrisson	(United Kingdom) 2012 London	Swimming	Men's 200m freestyle S14

== See also ==
- Iceland at the Olympics
