= Swimming at the 2024 Summer Paralympics – Men's 50 metre freestyle S11 =

Men's 50 metre freestyle S11 at the XVII Paralympic Games
- Venue: Paris La Défense Arena
- Dates: 31 August 2024
- Competitors: 13

Medalists
1st place, gold medalist(s)		Keiichi Kimura	Japan
2nd place, silver medalist(s)		Dongdong Hua	China
2nd place, silver medalist(s)		Wendell Belarmino Pereira	Brazil

The men's 50 metre freestyle swimming event (S11) event at the 2024 Paralympic Games took place on Saturday 31 August 2024, at the La Défense Arena in Paris. The heats took place at 11.38 a.m.

== Heats ==
The swimmers with the top eight times, regardless of heat, advanced to the final.

Rank	Heat	Lane	Name	Nationality	Time	Notes
1	1	6	David Kratochvil	Czech Republic	26.04	Q
2	1	4	Hua Dongdong	China	26.43	Q
3	1	5	Bozun Yang	China	26.64	Q
4	2	5	Keiichi Kimura	Japan	26.74	Q
5	1	3	Edgaras Matakas	Lithuania	26.75	Q
6	2	3	Wendell Belarmino Pereira	Brazil	26.76	Q
7	2	2	Matheus Rheine	Brazil	26.91	Q
8	2	6	Danylo Chufarov	Ukraine	26.98	Q
9	2	4	Rogier Dorsman	Netherlands	27.18	
9	2	7	Marco Meneses	Portugal	27.18	
11	1	7	Jose Ramon Cantero Elvira	Spain	27.74	
12	1	2	Mykhailo Serbin	Ukraine	27.88	
13	2	1	Brayan Triana	Colombia	28.59	

Q : qualified for final

== Final ==
The final took place on the same day, at 19.41:

Rank	Lane	Name	Nationality	Time	Notes
1st place, gold medalist(s)	6	Keiichi Kimura	Japan	25.98	
(silver)	5	Dongdong Hua	China	26.11	
(silver)	7	Wendell Belarmino Pereira	Brazil	26.11	
4	8	Danylo Chufarov	Ukraine	26.28	
5	4	David Kratochvil	Czech Republic	26.43	
6	2	Edgaras Matakas	Lithuania	26.68	
6	3	Bozun Yang	China	26.68	
8	1	Matheus Rheine	Brazil	26.93	
