= Iceland at the 1992 Summer Paralympics =

- IPC code: ISL
- NPC: National Paralympic Committee of Iceland
- Website: www.ifsport.is

in Barcelona and Madrid
- Competitors: 12 in 2 sports
- Medals Ranked 13th: Gold 13 Silver 8 Bronze 18 Total 39

Summer Paralympics appearances (overview)
- 1980; 1984; 1988; 1992; 1996; 2000; 2004; 2008; 2012; 2016; 2020; 2024

Iceland competed at the 1992 Summer Paralympics in Barcelona and Madrid Spain. 12 competitors from Iceland won 17 medals including 3 gold, 2 silver and 12 bronze and finished 31st in the medal table. Iceland finished third in Madrid with 10 gold, 6 silvers and 6 bronze, totaling a total of another 22 medals and finished the games at the 13th place.

== Medalists ==
Medal	Name	Sport	Event
Gold	Geir Sverrisson	Swimming	Men's 100m breaststroke SB9
Gold	Ólafur Eiríksson	Swimming	Men's 100m butterfly S9
Gold	Ólafur Eiríksson	Swimming	Men's 400m freestyle S9
Silver	Kristín Hákonardóttir	Swimming	Women's 200m individual medley SM8
Silver	Lilja Snorradóttir	Swimming	Women's 400m freestyle S9
Bronze	Geir Sverrisson	Athletics	Men's 100m TS4
Bronze	Haukur Gunnarsson	Athletics	Men's 200m C7
Bronze	Ólafur Eiríksson	Swimming	Men's 100m freestyle S9
Bronze	Ólafur Eiríksson	Swimming	Men's 200m individual medley SM9
Bronze	Birkir Gunnarsson	Swimming	Men's 400m freestyle B1
Bronze	Lilja Snorradóttir	Swimming	Women's 50m freestyle S9
Bronze	Rut Sverrisdottir	Swimming	Women's 100m backstroke B3
Bronze	Kristín Hákonardóttir	Swimming	Women's 100m backstroke S8
Bronze	Lilja Snorradóttir	Swimming	Women's 100m backstroke S9
Bronze	Lilja Snorradóttir	Swimming	Women's 100m butterfly S9
Bronze	Lilja Snorradóttir	Swimming	Women's 100m freestyle S9
Bronze	Rut Sverrisdottir	Swimming	Women's 200m individual medley B3

== See also ==
- Iceland at the Paralympics
- Iceland at the 1992 Summer Olympics
