= Iceland at the 2026 Winter Paralympics =

- Flag of Iceland
- IPC code: ISL
- NPC: National Paralympic Committee of Iceland

in Milan & Cortina d'Ampezzo, Italy 6 March 2026 – 15 March 2026
- Competitors: 1 (1 woman) in 1 sport
- Medals: Gold 0 Silver 0 Bronze 0 Total 0

Winter Paralympics appearances (overview)
- 1994; 1998–2006; 2010; 2014; 2018; 2022; 2026

Iceland will compete at the 2026 Winter Paralympics in Milan & Cortina d'Ampezzo, Italy, which will take place between 6–15 March 2026.

== Competitors ==
The following is the list of number of competitors participating at the Games per sport/discipline.

Sport	Men	Women	Total
Para cross-country skiing	0	1	1
Total	0	1	1

== Para cross-country skiing ==
Athlete	Class	Event	Qualification		Semifinal		Final	
Athlete	Class	Event	Time	Rank	Time	Rank	Time	Rank
Arna Albertsdóttir	LW10	Women's sprint, sitting	3:38.98	19	Did not advance			
Arna Albertsdóttir	LW10	Women's 10 km, sitting	—N/a				40:01.8	19

== See also ==
- Iceland at the Paralympics
- Iceland at the 2026 Winter Olympics
