= Iceland at the 2014 Winter Paralympics =

- IPC code: ISL
- NPC: National Paralympic Committee of Iceland
- Website: www.ifsport.is

in Sochi
- Competitors: 2 in 1 sport
- Medals: Gold 0 Silver 0 Bronze 0 Total 0

Winter Paralympics appearances (overview)
- 1994; 1998–2006; 2010; 2014; 2018; 2022; 2026

Iceland sent a delegation to compete at the 2014 Winter Paralympics in Sochi, Russia from 7–16 March 2014. This was Iceland's third time participating at a Winter Paralympic Games. The Icelandic delegation consisted of two alpine skiers, Erna Friðriksdóttir and Jóhann Þór Hólmgrímsson. Jóhann finished 23rd in the men's sitting giant slalom, while Erna finished 10th in the women's sitting slalom and 9th in the women's sitting giant slalom.

== Background ==
Iceland has participated in every Summer Paralympics since the 1980 Summer Paralympics. Before Sochi, they had only participated in two Winter Paralympic Games, the 1994 and 2010 editions, Sochi was therefore their third appearance at a Winter Paralympics. The 2014 Winter Paralympics were held from 7–16 March 2014, in Sochi, Russia; 45 countries and 547 athletes took part in the multi-sport event. The Icelandic delegation to Sochi consisted of two alpine skiers, Erna Friðriksdóttir and Jóhann Þór Hólmgrímsson. Erna was chosen as the Icelandic flag-bearer for the parade of nations during the opening ceremony, and Jóhann was chosen for the closing ceremony.

== Disability classification ==
Every participant at the Paralympics has their disability grouped into one of five disability categories: amputation, the condition may be congenital or sustained through injury or illness; cerebral palsy; wheelchair athletes, though there is often overlap between this and other categories; visual impairment, including blindness; and Les autres, any physical disability that does not fall strictly under one of the other categories, like dwarfism or multiple sclerosis. Each Paralympic sport then has its own classifications, dependent upon the specific physical demands of competition. Events are given a code, made of numbers and letters, describing the type of event and classification of the athletes competing. Events with "B" in the code are for athletes with visual impairment, codes LW1 to LW9 are for athletes who stand to compete and LW10 to LW12 are for athletes who compete sitting down. Alpine skiing events grouped athletes into separate competitions for sitting, standing and visually impaired athletes.

== Alpine skiing ==
Jóhann Þór Hólmgrímsson was born with spina bifida, and is classified as an LW12-1 and competes in a sitting position. He was 21 years old at the time of the Sochi Paralympics. On 13 March, Jóhann took part in the men's sitting slalom, but did not finish the first leg of the race. On 15 March, in the men's sitting giant slalom, he finished the first run in 1 minute and 56.84 seconds, and the second run in a faster 1 minute and 41.59 seconds. Jóhann's total time of 3 minutes and 38.43 seconds put him 23rd and last among competitors who finished both legs. The gold medal was won by Christoph Kunz of Switzerland in a time of 2 minutes and 32.73 seconds.

Erna Friðriksdóttir was also born with spina bifida, and is also classified as LW12-1. She had previously represented Iceland at the 2010 Winter Paralympics, and was 26 years old at the time of the Sochi Paralympics. On 12 March, she participated in the women's sitting slalom, finishing the first run in a time of 1 minute and 33.41 seconds, and the second in 1 minute and 36.89 seconds. Her time of 3 minutes and 10.30 seconds placed her 10th and last among the classified finishers, and 1 minute behind gold medallist Anna Schaffelhuber of Germany. Four days later, on 16 March, she competed in the women's sitting giant slalom. She posted run times of 1 minute and 49.53 seconds and a faster 1 minute and 41.66 seconds. Her total time was 3 minutes and 31.19 seconds, placing her 9th out of 12 finishers, and roughly 40 seconds behind the gold medalist Schaffelhuber.

Athlete	Event	Run 1			Run 2			Final/Total		
Athlete	Event	Time	Diff	Rank	Time	Diff	Rank	Time	Diff	Rank
Jóhann Þór Hólmgrímsson	Men's slalom, sitting	DNF								
Jóhann Þór Hólmgrímsson	Men's giant slalom, sitting	1:56.84	+38.74	31	1:41.59	+27.49	22	3:38.43	+1:05.70	23
Erna Friðriksdóttir	Women's slalom, sitting	1:33.41	+28.34	10	1:36.89	+32.03	10	3:10.30	+1:00.37	10
Erna Friðriksdóttir	Women's giant slalom, sitting	1:49.53	+19.09	9	1:41.66	+22.00	10	3:31.19	+39.93	9

== See also ==
- Iceland at the Paralympics
- Iceland at the 2014 Winter Olympics
