= Iceland at the 1996 Summer Paralympics =

- IPC code: ISL
- NPC: National Paralympic Committee of Iceland
- Website: www.ifsport.is

in Atlanta
- Competitors: 10 (6 men and 4 women)
- Medals: Gold 5 Silver 4 Bronze 5 Total 14

Summer Paralympics appearances (overview)
- 1980; 1984; 1988; 1992; 1996; 2000; 2004; 2008; 2012; 2016; 2020; 2024

Ten athletes (six men and four women) from Iceland competed at the 1996 Summer Paralympics in Atlanta, United States.

== Medals ==
Medal	Name	Sport	Event
1st place, gold medalist(s)	Ólafur Eiríksson	Swimming	Men's 100m butterfly S9
1st place, gold medalist(s)	Pálmar Guðmundsson	Swimming	Men's 200m freestyle S3
1st place, gold medalist(s)	Kristín Hákonardóttir	Swimming	Women's 100m backstroke S7
1st place, gold medalist(s)	Kristín Hákonardóttir	Swimming	Women's 100m breaststroke SB7
1st place, gold medalist(s)	Kristín Hákonardóttir	Swimming	Women's 200m medley SM7 SB7
2nd place, silver medalist(s)	Geir Sverrisson	Athletics	Men's 100m T45-46
2nd place, silver medalist(s)	Geir Sverrisson	Athletics	Men's 200m T45-46
2nd place, silver medalist(s)	Geir Sverrisson	Athletics	Men's 400m T42-46
2nd place, silver medalist(s)	Pálmar Guðmundsson	Swimming	Men's 100m freestyle S3
3rd place, bronze medalist(s)	Ólafur Eiríksson	Swimming	Men's 100m freestyle S9
3rd place, bronze medalist(s)	Ólafur Eiríksson	Swimming	Men's 200m backstroke SM9
3rd place, bronze medalist(s)	Birkir Gunnarsson	Swimming	Men's 100m backstroke B1
3rd place, bronze medalist(s)	Kristín Hákonardóttir	Swimming	Women's 100m freestyle S7
3rd place, bronze medalist(s)	Kristín Hákonardóttir	Swimming	Women's 50m freestyle MH

== See also ==
- Iceland at the Paralympics
- Iceland at the 1996 Summer Olympics
