= Iceland at the 2020 Summer Paralympics =

- IPC code: ISL
- NPC: National Paralympic Committee of Iceland
- Website: www.ifsport.is

in Tokyo
- Competitors: 6 in 3 sports
- Flag bearers: Patrekur Axelsson; Thelma Björg Björnsdóttir
- Medals: Gold 0 Silver 0 Bronze 0 Total 0

Summer Paralympics appearances (overview)
- 1980; 1984; 1988; 1992; 1996; 2000; 2004; 2008; 2012; 2016; 2020; 2024

Iceland competed at the 2020 Summer Paralympics in Tokyo, Japan, from 24 August to 5 September 2021. They did not win any medals but had several top 10 placements. Their best placement was by Már Gunnarsson who finished fifth in men's 100 m backstroke S11.

== Competitors ==
The following is the list of number of competitors participating in the Games.

Sport	Men	Women	Total
Athletics	1	1	2
Cycling	1	0	1
Swimming	1	2	3
Total	3	3	6

== Athletics ==
Men's track

Athlete	Event	Heats		Final	
Athlete	Event	Result	Rank	Result	Rank
Patrekur Axelsson	Men's 400m T11	56.73 PB	3	Did not advance	

Women's field

Athlete	Event	Final	
Athlete	Event	Result	Rank
Bergrún Ósk Aðalsteinsdóttir	Women's long jump T37	4.04	8
Bergrún Ósk Aðalsteinsdóttir	Women's shot put F37	9.57	7

== Cycling ==
=== Road ===
Athlete	Event	Time	Rank
Arna Albertsdóttir	Women's road race H1–4	1:22:04	15
Arna Albertsdóttir	Women's road time trial H1–3	48:22.33	11

== Swimming ==
Two Icelandic swimmer has successfully entered the paralympic slot after breaking the MQS.

Athlete	Event	Heat		Final	
Athlete	Event	Result	Rank	Result	Rank
Thelma Björg Björnsdóttir	400 m freestyle S6	6:31.67	13	Did not advance	
Thelma Björg Björnsdóttir	100 m breaststroke SB5	1:54.02	8 Q	1:54.88	8
Már Gunnarsson	50 m freestyle S11	29.30	13	Did not advance	
Már Gunnarsson	100 m backstroke S11	1:10.90	3 Q	1:10.36	5
Már Gunnarsson	100 m butterfly S11	1:14.86	11	Did not advance	
Már Gunnarsson	200 m individual medley SM11	2:39.63	8 Q	2:37.43	8
Róbert Ísak Jónsson	100 m breaststroke SB14	1:10.12	10	Did not advance	
Róbert Ísak Jónsson	100 m butterfly S14	58.34	7 Q	58.06	6
Róbert Ísak Jónsson	200 m individual medley SM14	2:15.37	7 Q	2:12.89	6

Legend: Q=Qualified; ER=European record; NR=National record

== See also ==
- Iceland at the Paralympics
- Iceland at the 2020 Summer Olympics
