= Iceland at the 1984 Summer Paralympics =

Iceland's performance at the 1984 Summer Paralympics

- IPC code: ISL
- NPC: National Paralympic Committee of Iceland
- Website: www.ifsport.is

in Stoke Mandeville/New York
- Competitors: 13
- Medals Ranked 36th: Gold 0 Silver 2 Bronze 8 Total 10

Summer Paralympics appearances (overview)
- 1980; 1984; 1988; 1992; 1996; 2000; 2004; 2008; 2012; 2016; 2020; 2024

Iceland competed at the 1984 Summer Paralympics in Stoke Mandeville, Great Britain and New York City, United States. 13 competitors from Iceland won 10 medals, 2 silver and 8 bronze, and finished 36th in the medal table.

== Medalists ==
Medal	Name	Sport	Event
Silver	Jónas Óskarson	Swimming	Men's 100m backstroke A2
Silver	Sigrún Pétursdóttir	Swimming	Women's 25m backstroke C3
Bronze	Haukur Gunnarsson	Athletics	Men's 200m C7
Bronze	Haukur Gunnarsson	Athletics	Men's 400m C7
Bronze	Sigrún Pétursdóttir	Swimming	Women's 25m freestyle C3
Bronze	Anna Geirsdóttir	Swimming	Women's 50m breaststroke 3
Bronze	Sigrún Pétursdóttir	Swimming	Women's 50m freestyle C3
Bronze	Edda Bergmann	Swimming	Women's 100m breaststroke 5
Bronze	Oddný Óttarsdóttir	Swimming	Women's 100m freestyle C3
Bronze	Hafdís Gunnarsdóttir	Table tennis	Women's singles L3
Bronze	Hafdís Ásgeirsdóttir; Hafdís Gunnarsdóttir	Table tennis	Women's doubles

== See also ==
- Iceland at the Paralympics
- Iceland at the 1984 Summer Olympics
