= Iceland at the 2024 Summer Paralympics =

- Flag of Iceland
- IPC code: ISL
- NPC: Icelandic Sports Association for the Disabled

in Paris, France August 28, 2024 – September 8, 2024
- Competitors: 5 in 2 sports
- Flag bearers: Már Gunnarsson; Sonja Sigurðardóttir
- Medals: Gold 0 Silver 0 Bronze 0 Total 0

Summer Paralympics appearances (overview)
- 1980; 1984; 1988; 1992; 1996; 2000; 2004; 2008; 2012; 2016; 2020; 2024

Iceland competed at the 2024 Summer Paralympics in Paris, France, from 28 August to 8 September 2024.

== Competitors ==
The following is the list of number of competitors in the Games.

Sport	Men	Women	Total
Athletics	0	1	1
Swimming	2	2	4
Total	2	3	5

== Athletics ==
Women

Athlete	Event	Qualification		Semifinal		Final	
Athlete	Event	Result	Rank	Result	Rank	Result	Rank
Ingeborg Eide Garðarsdóttir	Women's shot put F37	—				9.38	9

== Swimming ==
Athlete	Event	Heat		Final	
Athlete	Event	Result	Rank	Result	Rank
Már Gunnarsson	Men's 100 metre backstroke S11	1:11.38	6 Q	1:10.21	7
Róbert Ísak Jónsson	Men's 100 metre butterfly S14	58.35	8 Q	57.92	6
Thelma Björg Björnsdóttir	Women's 100 metre breaststroke SB5	1:58.93	7 Q	1:58.62	7
Sonja Sigurðardóttir	Women's 100 metre freestyle S3	2:32.31	12	Did not advance	
Sonja Sigurðardóttir	Women's 50 metre backstroke S3	1:10.65	8 Q	1:07.46	7

Legend : Q = Qualified

== See also ==
- Iceland at the 2024 Summer Olympics
- Iceland at the Paralympics
