= Swimming at the 2020 Summer Paralympics – Men's 400 metre freestyle S11 =

Men's 400 metre freestyle S11 at the XVI Paralympic Games
- Venue: Tokyo Aquatics Centre
- Dates: 26 August 2021
- Competitors: 10 from 9 nations

Medalists
1st place, gold medalist(s)		Rogier Dorsman	Netherlands
2nd place, silver medalist(s)		Uchu Tomita	Japan
3rd place, bronze medalist(s)		Hua Dongdong	China

The Men's 400 metre freestyle S11 event at the 2020 Paralympic Games took place on 26 August 2021, at the Tokyo Aquatics Centre.

== Heats ==
The swimmers with the top 8 times, regardless of heat, advanced to the final.

Rank	Heat	Lane	Name	Nationality	Time	Notes
1	2	4	Rogier Dorsman	Netherlands	4:30.23	Q
2	1	4	Uchu Tomita	Japan	4:35.77	Q
3	2	5	Hua Dongdong	China	4:37.90	Q
4	1	5	Mykhailo Serbin	Ukraine	4:43.46	Q
5	2	3	Matheus Rheine Correa de Souza	Brazil	4:52.38	Q
6	1	2	Matthew Cabraja	Canada	4:56.42	Q
7	2	6	José Ramón Cantero Elvira	Spain	4:59.73	Q
8	1	3	Viktor Smyrnov	Ukraine	5:00.97	Q
	1	6	Hryhory Zudzilau	Belarus	DNS	
	2	2	Marco Meneses	Portugal	DNS	

== Final ==
400m freestyle final
Rank	Lane	Name	Nationality	Time	Notes
1st place, gold medalist(s)	4	Rogier Dorsman	Netherlands	4:28.47	
2nd place, silver medalist(s)	5	Uchu Tomita	Japan	4:31.69	
3rd place, bronze medalist(s)	3	Hua Dongdong	China	4:34.89	
4	6	Mykhailo Serbin	Ukraine	4:41.21	
5	2	Matheus Rheine Correa de Souza	Brazil	4:44.64	
6	1	José Ramón Cantero Elvira	Spain	4:57.25	
7	7	Matthew Cabraja	Canada	4:57.63	
	8	Viktor Smyrnov	Ukraine	DNS	
