= 2018 World Para Swimming European Championships – Men's 400 metres freestyle =

The men's 400 metres freestyle at the 2018 World Para Swimming European Championships was held at the National Aquatic Centre in Dublin from 13 to 19 August. 8 classification finals are held in all over this event.

== Medalists ==
Event	Gold		Silver		Bronze	
S6	Thijs van Hofweegen (NED)	5:09.96	Daniel Videira (POR)	5:24.12	Yoav Valinsky (ISR)	5:39.88
S7	Michael Jones (GBR)	4:48.54	Mark Malyar (ISR)	4:48.69	Andreas Skaar Bjornstad (NOR)	4:51.40
S8	Inigo Llopis Sanz (ESP)	4:40.78	Gioele Ciampricotti (ITA)	4:59.97	Joshua Grub (SUI)	5:00.26
S9	Federico Morlacchi (ITA)	4:16.92	Lewis White (GBR)	4:18.30	Jacobo Garrido Brun (ESP)	4:23.70
S10	Maksym Krypak (UKR)	4:01.86	Bas Takken (NED)	4:03.89	Stefano Raimondi (ITA)	4:06.61
S11	Vyktor Smyrnov (UKR)	5:01.63	Salvatore Urso (ITA)	5:17.56	Mykhailo Serbin (UKR)	5:17.86
S12	Iaroslav Denysenko (UKR)	4:08.00	Danylo Chufarov (UKR)	4:22.75	Rogier Dorsman (NED)	4:36.11
S13	Ihar Boki (BLR)	4:01.12	Kyrylo Garashchecnko (UKR)	4:03.01	Alex Portal (FRA)	4:13.04
WR world record | AR area record | CR championship record | GR games record | NR national record | OR Olympic record | PB personal best | SB season best | WL world leading (in a given season)

== See also ==
- List of IPC world records in swimming
