= Iceland at the 2010 Winter Paralympics =

- IPC code: ISL
- NPC: National Paralympic Committee of Iceland
- Website: www.ifsport.is

in Vancouver
- Competitors: 1 in 1 sport
- Flag bearer: Erna Friðriksdóttir
- Medals: Gold 0 Silver 0 Bronze 0 Total 0

Winter Paralympics appearances (overview)
- 1994; 1998–2006; 2010; 2014; 2018; 2022; 2026

Iceland sent a delegation to compete at the 2010 Winter Paralympics, in Vancouver, British Columbia, Canada. The country thus made its return to the Winter Paralympics after a sixteen-year absence; its only prior participation had been in 1994.

Iceland fielded a single athlete, in alpine skiing.

== Alpine skiing ==
Erna Friðriksdóttir was Iceland's sole representative in alpine skiing.

In the slalom, she completed the first run, crashed twice during the second and struggled to pick herself up, eventually reaching the finish line. She was recorded as disqualified for her second run, however.

Athlete	Event	Final					
Athlete	Event	Run 1	Run 2	Run 3	Total Time	Calculated Time	Rank
Erna Friðriksdóttir	Slalom	2:04.05 (14th) (last out of those who completed the race)	DSQ	n/a	n/a	n/a	DSQ
Erna Friðriksdóttir	Giant slalom						

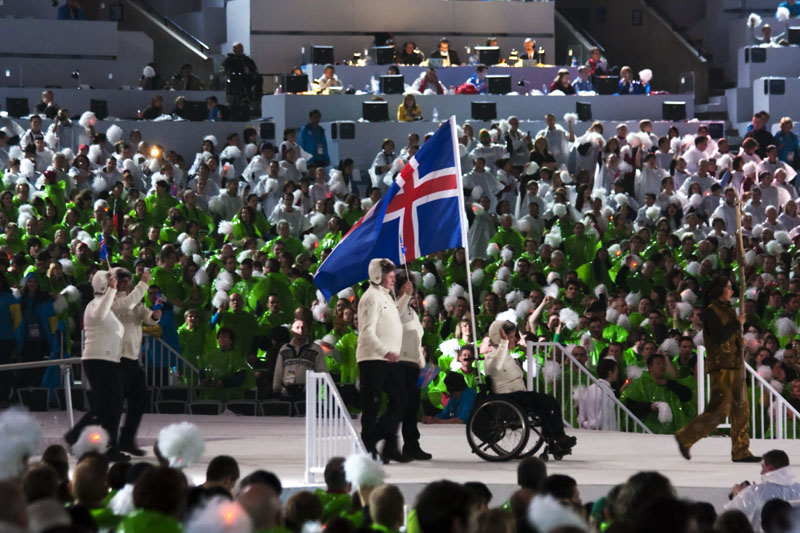
As the flag bearer for Iceland, Erna Fridriksdottir is entering the stadium at the Opening Ceremony on March 12th.

== See also ==
- Iceland at the 2010 Winter Olympics
- Iceland at the Paralympics
