= Iceland at the 1980 Summer Paralympics =

- IPC code: ISL
- NPC: National Paralympic Committee of Iceland
- Website: www.ifsport.is

in Arnhem
- Competitors: 12
- Medals Ranked 31st: Gold 1 Silver 0 Bronze 1 Total 2

Summer Paralympics appearances (overview)
- 1980; 1984; 1988; 1992; 1996; 2000; 2004; 2008; 2012; 2016; 2020; 2024

Iceland competed at the 1980 Summer Paralympics in Arnhem, Netherlands. 12 competitors from Iceland won 2 medals, 1 gold and 1 bronze, and finished joint 31st in the medal table with Colombia.

== Medalists ==
Medal	Name	Sport	Event
Gold	Sigurrós Karlsdóttir	Swimming	Women's 50m breaststroke E1
Bronze	Jónas Óskarson	Weightlifting	Men's middleweight -75kg amputee

== See also ==
- Iceland at the Paralympics
- Iceland at the 1980 Summer Olympics
