= Uchu Tomita =

Japanese Paralympic swimmer

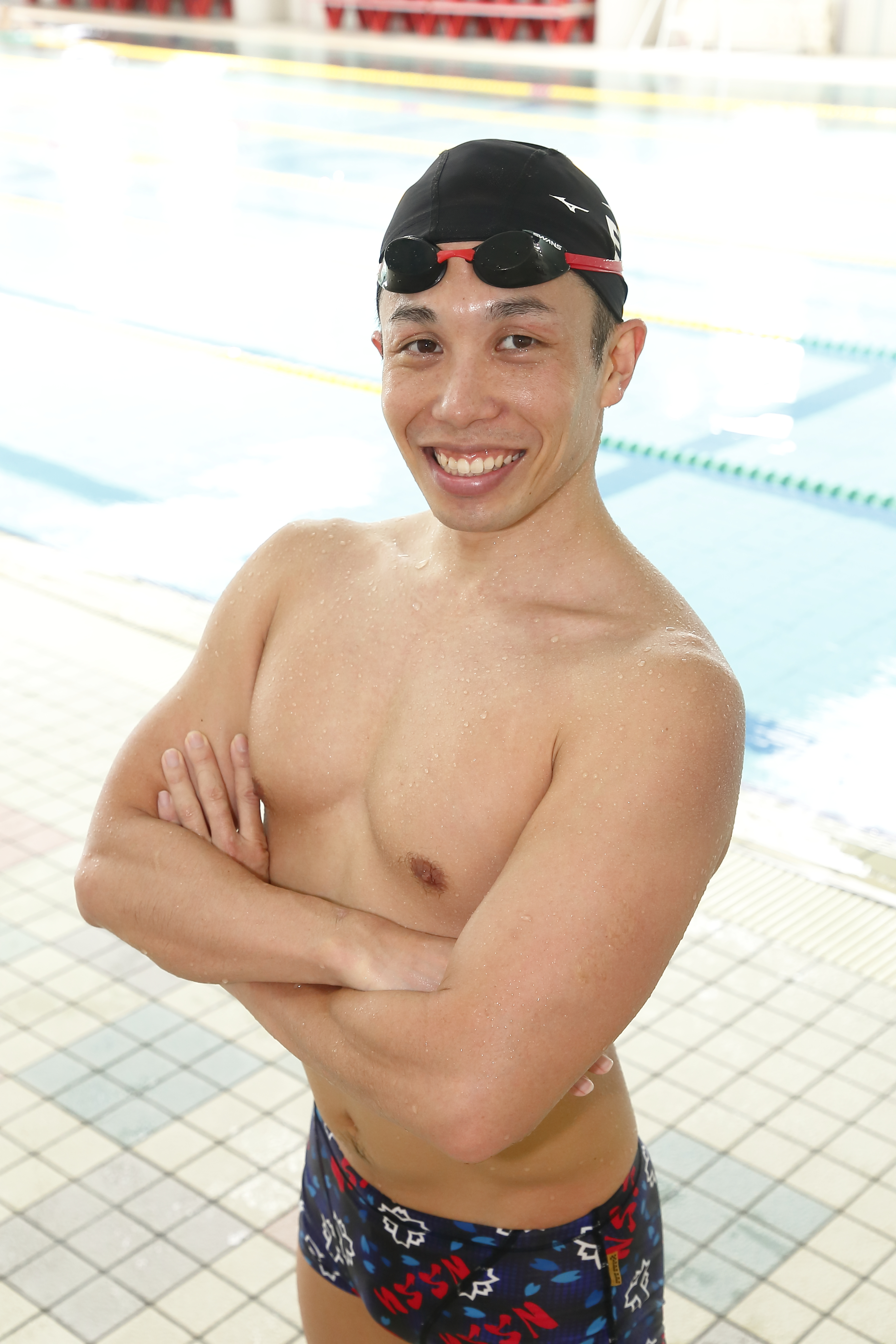

Personal information
- Nationality: Japanese
- Born: 28 February 1989 (age 37) Kumamoto, Japan

Sport
- Sport: Para swimming
- Disability class: S11
- Coached by: Takumi Uegaki
Medal record
Paralympic swimming
Representing Japan
Paralympic Games
Silver medal – second place	2020 Tokyo	400 m freestyle S11
Silver medal – second place	2020 Tokyo	100 m butterfly S11
Bronze medal – third place	2020 Tokyo	200 m ind. medley SM11
Bronze medal – third place	2024 Paris	400 m freestyle S11
World Championships
Silver medal – second place	2019 London	100 m butterfly S11
Silver medal – second place	2019 London	400 m freestyle S11
Silver medal – second place	2022 Madeira	100 m freestyle S11
Silver medal – second place	2025 Singapore	400 m freestyle S11
Bronze medal – third place	2022 Madeira	100 m butterfly S11
Bronze medal – third place	2022 Madeira	400 m freestyle S11
Bronze medal – third place	2022 Madeira	200 m ind. medley SM11
Bronze medal – third place	2023 Manchester	100 m butterfly S11
Asian Para Games
Gold medal – first place	2018 Jakarta	100 m freestyle S11
Gold medal – first place	2022 Hangzhou	400 m freestyle S11
Silver medal – second place	2018 Jakarta	50 m freestyle S11
Silver medal – second place	2018 Jakarta	200 m ind. medley SM11
Silver medal – second place	2022 Hangzhou	100 m butterfly S11
Silver medal – second place	2026 Aichi–Nagoya	400 m freestyle S11

Uchu Tomita (born 28 February 1989) is a Japanese para swimmer who represented Japan at the 2020 and 2024 Summer Paralympics.

== Career ==
Tomita represented Japan at the 2020 Summer Paralympics and won silver medals in the 100 metre butterfly S11 and 400 metre freestyle S11 events, and a bronze medal in the 200 metre individual medley SM11 event.
