= Iceland at the 2012 Summer Paralympics =

- IPC code: ISL
- NPC: National Paralympic Committee of Iceland
- Website: www.ifsport.is

in London
- Competitors: 4 in 2 sports
- Medals Ranked 52nd: Gold 1 Silver 0 Bronze 0 Total 1

Summer Paralympics appearances (overview)
- 1980; 1984; 1988; 1992; 1996; 2000; 2004; 2008; 2012; 2016; 2020; 2024

Iceland competed at the 2012 Summer Paralympics in London, United Kingdom from August 29 to September 9, 2012.

== Medallists ==
Medal	Name	Sport	Event	Date
Gold	Jón Margeir Sverrisson	Swimming	Men's 200m Freestyle S14	2 September

== Athletics ==
Men’s Track and Road Events

Athlete	Event	Heat		Final	
Athlete	Event	Result	Rank	Result	Rank
Helgi Sveinsson	100m T42	15.64	5	did not advance	

Men’s Field Events

Athlete	Event	Distance	Rank
Helgi Sveinsson	Long Jump F42-44	4.25	10
Helgi Sveinsson	Javelin Throw F42	47.61	5

Women’s Track and Road Events

Athlete	Event	Heat		Final	
Athlete	Event	Result	Rank	Result	Rank
Matthildur Þorsteinsdóttir	100m T37	15.89	8	did not advance	
Matthildur Þorsteinsdóttir	200m T37	32.16	6	did not advance	

Women’s Field Events

Athlete	Event	Distance	Rank
Matthildur Þorsteinsdóttir	Long Jump F37-38	4.08	8

== Swimming ==
Men

Athletes	Event	Heat		Final	
Athletes	Event	Time	Rank	Time	Rank
Jón Margeir Sverrisson	200m freestyle S14	2:00.32	2 Q	1:59.62	1st place, gold medalist(s)
Jón Margeir Sverrisson	100m backstroke S14	1:10.72	17	did not advance	
Jón Margeir Sverrisson	100m breaststroke SB14	1:13.91	11	did not advance	

Women

Athletes	Event	Heat		Final	
Athletes	Event	Time	Rank	Time	Rank
Kolbrún Stefánsdóttir	200m freestyle S14	2:24.57	12	did not advance	
Kolbrún Stefánsdóttir	100m backstroke S14	1:21.61	14	did not advance	
Kolbrún Stefánsdóttir	100m breaststroke SB14	1:30.58	14	did not advance	

== See also ==
- Iceland at the 2012 Summer Olympics
