= Iceland at the 2022 Winter Paralympics =

- Flag of Iceland
- IPC code: ISL
- NPC: National Paralympic Committee of Iceland
- Website: www.ifsport.is

in Beijing, China 4 March 2022 – 13 March 2022
- Competitors: 1 (1 man) in 1 sport
- Flag bearer: Hilmar Snær Örvarsson
- Medals: Gold 0 Silver 0 Bronze 0 Total 0

Winter Paralympics appearances (overview)
- 1994; 1998–2006; 2010; 2014; 2018; 2022; 2026

Iceland competed at the 2022 Winter Paralympics in Beijing, China which took place between 4–13 March 2022. Alpine skier Hilmar Snær Örvarsson competed in two events. He previously represented Iceland at the 2018 Winter Paralympics held in Pyeongchang, South Korea.

== Competitors ==
The following is the list of number of competitors participating at the Games per sport/discipline.

Sport	Men	Women	Total
Alpine skiing	1	0	1
Total	1	0	1

== Alpine skiing ==
One alpine skier represented Iceland.

Athlete	Event	Run 1		Run 2		Total	
Athlete	Event	Time	Rank	Time	Rank	Time	Rank
Hilmar Snær Örvarsson	Men's slalom, standing	45.17	9	51.75	4	1:36.92	5
Hilmar Snær Örvarsson	Men's giant slalom, standing	Did not finish					

== See also ==
- Iceland at the Paralympics
- Iceland at the 2022 Winter Olympics
