= 2022 World Para Swimming Championships – Men's 200 metre individual medley =

The men's 200m individual medley events at the 2022 World Para Swimming Championships were held at the Penteada Olympic Swimming Complex in Madeira between 12 and 18 June.

== Medalists ==
Event	Gold	Silver	Bronze
SM5	Antoni Ponce Bertran; Spain	Samuel da Silva de Oliveira; Brazil	Tiago de Oliveira Ferreira; Brazil
SM6	Nelson Crispín; Colombia	Juan Jose Gutierrez Bermudez; Mexico	Talisson Glock; Brazil
SM7	Carlos Serrano Zárate; Colombia	Iñaki Basiloff; Argentina	Andrii Trusov; Ukraine
SM8	Robert Griswold; United States	Dimosthenis Michalentzakis; Greece	Diogo Cancela; Portugal
SM9	Timothy Hodge; Australia	Ugo Didier; France	Federico Morlacchi; Italy
SM10	Stefano Raimondi; Italy	Col Pearse; Australia	Bas Takken; Netherlands
SM11	Rogier Dorsman; Netherlands	Mykhailo Serbin; Ukraine	Uchu Tomita; Japan
SM13	Alex Portal; France	Kyrylo Garashchenko; Ukraine	Thomas van Wanrooij; Netherlands
SM14	Gabriel Bandeira; Brazil	Nicholas Bennett; Canada	Dmytro Vanzenko; Ukraine

== Results ==
=== SM7 ===
Final

Seven swimmers from six nations took part.

Rank	Name	Nation	Result	Notes
1st place, gold medalist(s)	Carlos Serrano Zárate	Colombia	2:31.45	
2nd place, silver medalist(s)	Iñaki Basiloff	Argentina	2:32.10	
3rd place, bronze medalist(s)	Andrii Trusov	Ukraine	2:32.56	
4	Christian Sadie	South Africa	2:34.08	AF
5	Rudy Garcia-Tolson	United States	2:43.81	
6	Niranjan Mukundan	India	2:56.16	
7	Lucas Nicolas Poggi	Argentina	3:04.42	

=== SM9 ===
Final

Eight swimmers from seven nations took part.

Rank	Name	Nation	Result	Notes
1st place, gold medalist(s)	Timothy Hodge	Australia	2:13.43	WR
2nd place, silver medalist(s)	Ugo Didier	France	2:15.74	
3rd place, bronze medalist(s)	Federico Morlacchi	Italy	2:20.99	
4	Jacobo Garrido Brun	Spain	2:22.94	
5	Lucas Lamente Mozela	Brazil	2:24.07	
6	Jonas Kesnar	Czech Republic	2:26.12	
7	Igor Hrehorowicz	Poland	2:26.40	
8	Oscar Salguero Galisteo	Spain	2:27.57	

=== SM10 ===
Final

Eight swimmers from six nations took part.

Rank	Name	Nation	Result	Notes
1st place, gold medalist(s)	Stefano Raimondi	Italy	2:12.42	
2nd place, silver medalist(s)	Col Pearse	Australia	2:13.76	
3rd place, bronze medalist(s)	Bas Takken	Netherlands	2:13.88	
4	Riccardo Menciotti	Italy	2:16.01	
5	Alec Elliot	Canada	2:16.67	
6	Alan Ogorzalek	Turkey	2:18.97	
7	Alex Saffy	Australia	2:19.05	
8	Justin Kaps	Germany		DSQ

=== SM11 ===
Final

Five swimmers from five nations took part.

Rank	Name	Nation	Result	Notes
1st place, gold medalist(s)	Rogier Dorsman	Netherlands	2:18.80	CR
2nd place, silver medalist(s)	Mykhailo Serbin	Ukraine	2:27.16	
3rd place, bronze medalist(s)	Uchu Tomita	Japan	2:28.17	
4	David Kratochvil	Czech Republic	2:35.81	
5	Gudfinnur Karlsson	Iceland	2:58.41	
