= Dimosthenis Michalentzakis =

Greek Paralympic swimmer

Personal information
- Nationality: Greek
- Born: 19 October 1998 (age 28) Alexandroupolis, Greece
- Height: 183 cm (6.00 ft)

Sport
- Sport: Swimming
- Strokes: Freestyle, Butterfly, Individual medley
- Classifications: S9, SM9, S8, SB8, SM8
- Club: Kotinos Alexandroupolis, Oftha
- Coach: Tasos Kallitsaris
Medal record
Men's para swimming
Representing Greece
Paralympic Games
| Gold medal – first place | 2016 Rio de Janeiro | 100 m butterfly S9 |
| Bronze medal – third place | 2020 Tokyo | 100 m freestyle S8 |
World Championships
| Gold medal – first place | 2017 Mexico City | 100 m butterfly S9 |
| Gold medal – first place | 2019 London | 50 m freestyle S8 |
| Gold medal – first place | 2019 London | 100 m freestyle S8 |
| Gold medal – first place | 2019 London | 100 m butterfly S8 |
| Gold medal – first place | 2022 Madeira | 100 m freestyle S8 |
| Gold medal – first place | 2023 Manchester | 50 m freestyle S8 |
| Silver medal – second place | 2022 Madeira | 50 m freestyle S8 |
| Silver medal – second place | 2022 Madeira | 200 m ind. medley SM8 |
| Bronze medal – third place | 2025 Singapore | 200 m ind. medley SM8 |
European Championships
| Silver medal – second place | 2016 Funchal | 100m butterfly S9 |
| Gold medal – first place | 2018 Dublin | 100m butterfly S8 |
| Gold medal – first place | 2018 Dublin | 200m individual medley S8 |
| Gold medal – first place | 2020 Funchal | 50m freestyle S8 |
| Gold medal – first place | 2020 Funchal | 100m freestyle S8 |
| Gold medal – first place | 2020 Funchal | 100m butterfly S8 |
| Gold medal – first place | 2024 Funchal | 200m Individual Medley S8 |
| Silver medal – second place | 2024 Funchal | 100m butterfly S8 |
| Bronze medal – third place | 2026 Kocaeli | 50 m freestyle S8 |

Dimosthenis 'Dimos' Michalentzakis is a Greek Paralympic swimmer who competes in S9 and S8 classification events. He won Paralympic gold in the 100m butterfly S9 at 2016 Summer Paralympics in Rio de Janeiro and Paralympic bronze in the 100m freestyle S8 at 2020 Summer Paralympics in Tokyo. He was born in Alexandroupoli in 19/10/1998 and he has origin from Feres. He holds the world record in 200 meters freestyle in his category with a performance of 2:07:16. The Municipal Swimming Pool of Alexandroupoli has his name.

== Career ==
He started swimming at the age of 4 due to his disease which is obstetric paralysis in the right upper limb and he managed to pass all the swimming steps with great success. It is remarkable that Dimosthenis is the only Greek swimmer who swims also with the regular swimmers and succeeds to secure qualification limits for the Panhellenic Championships.

In 2014, he joined the national men's swimming team disabled athletes. At 2014 IPC Swimming European Championship in Eindhoven, he finished 4th in the 200m individual medley S9 race and 5th in the 100m butterfly S9, just 16 years old.

At the 2015 IPC Swimming World Championships in Glasgow, he finished 4th in the 100m butterfly S9. His greatest success, however, was achieved at the 2016 Paralympic Games in Brazil, as he won the Gold Paralympic medal and set a new Paralympic record (59:27) in the 100m butterfly S9.

At the 2017 World Para Swimming Championships in Mexico City, he won the gold medal in the 100m butterfly S9 race, while at 2018 World Para Swimming European Championships in Dublin he won two gold medals (100m butterfly S8, 200m individual medley S8). In 2018, he also competed in the men's 100 metre freestyle S10 event at the 2018 Mediterranean Games held in Tarragona, Spain.

At 2019 World Para Swimming Championships in London, he became world champion again, winning three gold medals in the S8 classification (50m freestyle, 100m freestyle, 100m butterfly).

At 2020 World Para Swimming European Open Championships in Funchal, he won three gold medals in the S8 classification (50m freestyle, 100m freestyle, 100m butterfly).

He was awarded as the Best Greek male athlete with a disability for 2019 and 2022.
