= Alpine skiing at the 2010 Winter Paralympics – Women's slalom =

Women's slalom at the X Paralympic Winter Games
- Paralympic alpine skiing
- Venue: Whistler Blackcomb
- Dates: March 14, 2010; March 15, 2010

The women's slalom competition of the Vancouver 2010 Paralympics was held at Whistler Blackcomb in Whistler, British Columbia. The competition was rescheduled to Sunday, March 14, and Monday, March 15, due to weather conditions.

== Visually impaired ==
In the slalom visually impaired, the athlete with a visual impairment has a sighted guide. The two skiers are considered a team, and dual medals are awarded.

Rank	Bib	Name	Country	Run 1	Rank	Run 2	Rank	Total	Difference
1st place, gold medalist(s)	4	Sabine Gasteiger; Guide: Stefan Schoner	Austria	55.90	1	1:04.66	1	2:00.56	
2nd place, silver medalist(s)	10	Viviane Forest; Guide: Lindsay Debou	Canada	56.76	2	1:04.69	2	2:01.45	+0.89
3rd place, bronze medalist(s)	3	Jessica Gallagher; Guide: Eric Bickerton	Australia	57.52	3	1:06.83	5	2:04.35	+3.79
4	2	Nadja Baumgartner; Guide: Chiarina Sawyer	Switzerland	1:01.68	5	1:05.31	3	2:06.99	+6.43
5	6	Henrieta Farkasova; Guide: Natalia Subrtova	Slovakia	57.77	4	1:15.89	9	2:13.66	+13.10
6	13	Kelly Gallagher; Guide: Claire Robb	Great Britain	1:05.94	8	1:09.32	6	2:15.26	+14.70
7	1	Natasha de Troyer; Guide: Diego van de Voorde	Belgium	1:04.27	6	1:13.92	8	2:18.19	+17.63
8	12	Melissa Perrine; Guide: Andrew Bor	Australia	1:09.56	9	1:12.91	7	2:22.47	+21.91
9	8	Anna Cohi Fornell; Guide: Raquel Garcia Borreguero	Spain	1:17.90	11	1:06.42	4	2:24.32	+23.76
10	11	Anna Kuliskova; Guide: Michaela Hubacova	Czech Republic	1:16.69	10	1:16.88	10	2:33.57	+33.01
11	15	Paquita Ramirez Capitan; Guide: Manel Fernandez Flores	Andorra	1:21.06	12	1:27.81	11	2:48.87	+48.31
	7	Caitlin Sarubbi; Guide: Gwynn Watkins	United States	1:05.10	7	DNF			
	14	Nikolina Santek; Guide: Vjeran Svaic	Croatia	1:22.20	13	DNF			
	5	Danelle Umstead; Guide: Rob Umstead	United States	DNF					
	9	Alexandra Frantseva; Guide: Polina Popova	Russia	DNF					

== Sitting ==
Rank	Bib	Name	Country	Run 1	Rank	Run 2	Rank	Total	Difference
1st place, gold medalist(s)	11	Claudia Lösch	Austria	1:05.81	2	1:06.24	1	2:12.05	
2nd place, silver medalist(s)	9	Stephani Victor	United States	1:04.57	1	1:08.06	2	2:12.63	+0.58
3rd place, bronze medalist(s)	1	Kuniko Obinata	Japan	1:06.77	3	1:11.83	3	2:18.60	+6.55
4	4	Anna Schaffelhuber	Germany	1:06.82	5	1:13.58	4	2:20.35	+8.30
5	6	Laurie Stephens	United States	1:09.96	6	1:22.07	7	2:28.89	+16.84
6	13	Anna Turney	Great Britain	1:17.79	7	1:30.87	9	2:40.83	+28.78
7	7	Luba Lowery	United States	1:20.48	9	1:25.70	8	2:43.49	+31.44
8	5	Alana Nichols	United States	1:31.07	11	1:15.34	5	2:46.41	+34.36
9	16	Linnea Ottosson Eide	Sweden	1:35.40	12	1:21.35	6	2:56.75	+44.70
	12	Daila Dameno	Italy	1:41.52	13	DNF			
	3	Yoshiko Tanaka	Japan	1:20.83	10	DNF			
	8	Tatsuko Aoki	Japan	1:06.77	4	DNF			
	14	Erna Friðriksdóttir	Iceland	2:04.05	14	DSQ			
	15	Ricci Kilgore	United States	1:18.64	8	DSQ			
	2	Anita Fuhrer	Switzerland	DNF					
	10	Jane Sowerby	Great Britain	DNF					
	17	Gyongyi Dani	Hungary	DNS					

== Standing ==
Rank	Bib	Name	Country	Run 1	Rank	Run 2	Rank	Total	Difference
1st place, gold medalist(s)	13	Lauren Woolstencroft	Canada	56.18	1	27.26	1	1:51.97	
2nd place, silver medalist(s)	14	Andrea Rothfuß	Germany	59.65	3	28.74	2	1:58.35	+6.38
3rd place, bronze medalist(s)	8	Karolina Wisniewska	Canada	59.76	4	28.70	3	1:58.84	+6.87
4	15	Marie Bochet	France	59.95	5	29.55	5	2:00.12	+8.15
5	12	Allison Jones	United States	1:01.12	7	29.81	4	2:01.19	+9.22
6	3	Inga Medvedeva	Russia	1:00.35	6	30.13	7	2:03.07	+11.10
7	9	Marina Perterer	Austria	1:03.25	9	29.93	6	2:05.67	+13.70
8	7	Solène Jambaqué	France	1:03.21	8	31.27	10	2:07.03	+15.06
9	5	Nathalie Tyack	France	1:04.98	11	30.98	8	2:07.94	+15.97
10	6	Katja Saarinen	Finland	1:03.61	10	32.11	11	2:08.05	+16.08
11	11	Karin Fasel	Switzerland	1:05.64	12	31.35	9	2:09.28	+17.31
12	1	Iveta Chlebakova	Slovakia	1:06.26	13	31.60	12	2:11.22	+19.25
13	17	Melanie Schwartz	Canada	1:08.92	14	32.07	13	2:15.31	+23.34
14	19	Elena Kudyakova	Russia	1:11.56	16	33.82	15	2:20.71	+28.74
15	4	Andrea Dziewior	Canada	1:13.77	18	32.88	14	2:21.49	+29.52
16	18	Hannah Pennington	United States	1:12.93	17	34.85	16	2:24.24	+32.27
	10	Petra Smarzova	Slovakia	59.02	2	DNF			
	2	Elitsa Storey	United States	1:09.76	15	DNS			
	20	Ursula Pueyo Marimon	Spain	DNF					
	21	Laura Valeanu	Romania	DNF					
	16	Arly Fogarty	Canada	DSQ					

== See also ==
- Alpine skiing at the 2010 Winter Olympics – Women's slalom
