= Iceland at the 2000 Summer Paralympics =

- IPC code: ISL
- NPC: National Paralympic Committee of Iceland
- Website: www.ifsport.is

in Sydney
- Competitors: 6 (5 male, 1 female) in 2 sports
- Medals Ranked 41st: Gold 2 Silver 0 Bronze 2 Total 4

Summer Paralympics appearances (overview)
- 1980; 1984; 1988; 1992; 1996; 2000; 2004; 2008; 2012; 2016; 2020; 2024

There were 1 female and 5 male athletes representing the country at the 2000 Summer Paralympics.

== Medal table ==
Medal	Name	Sport	Event
Gold	Kristín Hákonardóttir	Swimming	Women's 100m backstroke S7
Gold	Kristín Hákonardóttir	Swimming	Women's 100m breaststroke SB7
Bronze	Kristín Hákonardóttir	Swimming	Women's 100m freestyle S7
Bronze	Kristín Hákonardóttir	Swimming	Women's 200m individual medley SM7

== See also ==
- Iceland at the 2000 Summer Olympics
- Iceland at the Paralympics

== Bibliography ==
- International Paralympic Committee (2000). "Appendix C: Athlete Numbers - By Delegation". Sydney 2000 Paralympic Games Post Games Report. Sydney.
