= Swimming at the 2020 Summer Paralympics – Men's 100 metre breaststroke SB11 =

Men's 100 metre breaststroke SB11 at the XVI Paralympic Games
- Venue: Tokyo Aquatics Centre
- Dates: 1 September 2021
- Competitors: 12 from 10 nations

Medalists
1st place, gold medalist(s)		Rogier Dorsman	Netherlands
2nd place, silver medalist(s)		Keiichi Kimura	Japan
3rd place, bronze medalist(s)		Yang Bozun	China

The Men's 100 metre breaststroke SB8 event at the 2020 Paralympic Games took place on 1 September 2021, at the Tokyo Aquatics Centre.

== Heats ==
The swimmers with the top eight times, regardless of heat, advanced to the final.

Rank	Heat	Lane	Name	Nationality	Time	Notes
1	1	4	Rogier Dorsman	Netherlands	1:11.91	Q
2	2	4	Yang Bozun	China	1:12.98	Q
3	2	5	Keiichi Kimura	Japan	1:14.05	Q
4	1	3	Edgaras Matakas	Lithuania	1:17.41	Q
5	1	5	Leider Lemus	Colombia	1:17.47	Q
6	2	3	Viktor Smyrnov	Ukraine	1:17.57	Q
7	1	6	Federico Bassani	Italy	1:21.24	Q
8	2	2	Brayan Triana	Colombia	1:24.87	Q
9	1	2	Oleksandr Artiukhov	Ukraine	1:27.43	
10	2	7	Miroslav Smrcka	Czech Republic	1:28.29	
11	2	6	Przemyslaw Drag	Poland	1:32.26	
12	1	7	Nika Tvauri	Georgia	1:38.73	

== Final ==
100m breaststroke final
Rank	Lane	Name	Nationality	Time	Notes
1st place, gold medalist(s)	4	Rogier Dorsman	Netherlands	1:11.22	
2nd place, silver medalist(s)	3	Keiichi Kimura	Japan	1:11.78	
3rd place, bronze medalist(s)	5	Yang Bozun	China	1:12.62	
4	7	Viktor Smyrnov	Ukraine	1:15.78	
5	6	Edgaras Matakas	Lithuania	1:16.27	
6	2	Leider Lemus	Colombia	1:19.47	
7	1	Federico Bassani	Italy	1:20.57	
8	8	Brayan Triana	Colombia	1:26.16	
