= Swimming at the 2016 Summer Paralympics – Men's 100 metre butterfly S9 =

Men's 100 metre butterfly S9 at the XV Paralympic Games
- Venue: Olympic Aquatics Stadium
- Dates: 15 September 2016
- Competitors: 15 from 13 nations

Medalists
1st place, gold medalist(s)		Dimosthenis Michalentzakis	Greece
2nd place, silver medalist(s)		Federico Morlacchi	Italy
3rd place, bronze medalist(s)		Tamás Sors	Hungary

The Men's 100 metre butterfly S9 event at the 2016 Paralympic Games took place on 15 September 2016, at the Olympic Aquatics Stadium. Two heats were held. The swimmers with the eight fastest times advanced to the final.

== Heats ==
=== Heat 1 ===
9:30 15 September 2016:

Rank	Lane	Name	Nationality	Time	Notes
1	5	Tamás Sors	Hungary	1:00.58	Q
2	4	Dimosthenis Michalentzakis	Greece	1:01.91	Q
3	3	Marco Pulleiro	Argentina	1:04.25	Q
4	6	Jose Antonio Mari Alcaraz	Spain	1:04.39	Q
5	2	Vanilton Filho	Brazil	1:05.27	
6	7	Takuro Yamada	Japan	1:06.07	
7	1	Leo Lahteenmaki	Finland	1:09.43	

=== Heat 2 ===
9:33 15 September 2016:

Rank	Lane	Name	Nationality	Time	Notes
1	4	Federico Morlacchi	Italy	1:01.57	Q
2	5	Kristijan Vincetic	Croatia	1:01.92	Q
3	6	Juan Castillo Estevez	Cuba	1:02.04	Q
4	3	Brenden Hall	Australia	1:02.11	Q
5	7	Jesse Reynolds	New Zealand	1:04.50	
6	2	Timothy Hodge	Australia	1:05.21	
7	8	Logan Powell	Australia	1:06.66	
8	1	Hyun Kwon	South Korea	1:11.37	

== Final ==
17:30 15 September 2016:

Rank	Lane	Name	Nationality	Time	Notes
1st place, gold medalist(s)	3	Dimosthenis Michalentzakis	Greece	59.27	PR
2nd place, silver medalist(s)	5	Federico Morlacchi	Italy	59.52	
3rd place, bronze medalist(s)	4	Tamás Sors	Hungary	59.85	
4	7	Brenden Hall	Australia	1:01.85	
5	2	Juan Castillo Estevez	Cuba	1:01.93	
6	6	Kristijan Vincetic	Croatia	1:02.50	
7	1	Marco Pulleiro	Argentina	1:03.75	
8	8	Jesse Reynolds	New Zealand	1:04.31	
