= Iceland at the 2008 Summer Paralympics =

- IPC code: ISL
- NPC: National Paralympic Committee of Iceland
- Website: www.ifsport.is

in Beijing
- Competitors: 5 in 3 sports
- Flag bearers: Jón Oddur Halldórsson (opening); Eyþór Þrastarson (closing)
- Medals Ranked -th: Gold 0 Silver 0 Bronze 0 Total 0

Summer Paralympics appearances (overview)
- 1980; 1984; 1988; 1992; 1996; 2000; 2004; 2008; 2012; 2016; 2020; 2024

Iceland sent a delegation to compete at the 2008 Summer Paralympics in Beijing. According to official records, the country was represented by five athletes in athletics, powerlifting and swimming. Their performance was considered satisfactory as two of them improved on their personal records.

== Athletics ==
2 competitors:

Men

Athlete	Class	Event	Heats		Semifinal		Final		
Athlete	Class	Event	Result	Rank	Result	Rank	Result	Points	Rank
Baldur Baldursson	F37-38 (F37)	Long jump	N/A				5.42	942	7
Jón Oddur Halldórsson	T35	100 m	N/A				13.40	-	5

== Powerlifting ==
1 competitor:

Men

Athlete	Class	Event	Result	Rank
Steini Sölvason	-	-75 kg	115.0	12

== Swimming ==
2 competitors:

Men

Athlete	Class	Event	Heats		Final	
Athlete	Class	Event	Result	Rank	Result	Rank
Eyþór Þrastarson	S11	400 m freestyle	5:11.54	8 Q	5:15.63	8
Eyþór Þrastarson	S11	100 m backstroke	1:20.12	12	did not advance	

Women

Athlete	Class	Event	Heats		Final	
Athlete	Class	Event	Result	Rank	Result	Rank
Sonja Sigurðardóttir	S5	50 m backstroke	57.90	10	did not advance	

== See also ==
- 2008 Summer Paralympics
- Iceland at the Paralympics
- Iceland at the 2008 Summer Olympics
