= 2018 World Para Swimming European Championships – Men's 200 metres individual medley =

The men's 150 metres individual medley at the 2018 World Para Swimming European Championships was held at the National Aquatic Centre in Dublin from 13 to 19 August. 2 classification finals are held in all over this event.

== Medalists ==
Event	Gold		Silver		Bronze	
S6	Antoni Ponce Bertran (ESP)	2:51.18	Bence Ivan (HUN)	2:56.00	David Sanchez Sierra (ESP)	3:06.24
S8	Dimosthenis Michalentzakis (GRE)	2:25.42	Andreas Onea (AUT)	2:29.95	Carlos Martinez Fernandez (ESP)	2:33.76
S9	Federico Morlacchi (ITA)	2:17.55	Ugo Didier (ITA)	2:21.19	Tamás Tóth (HUN)	2:22.16
S10	Denys Dubrov (UKR)	2:05.63 WR	Maksym Krypak (UKR)	2:07.32	Riccardo Menciotti (ITA)	2:14.78
S11	Israel Oliver (ESP)	2:28.18	Viktor Smyrnov (UKR)	2:32.07	Hryhory Zudzilau (BLR)	2:32.43
S12	Iaroslav Denysenko (UKR)	2:12.67	Danylo Chufarov (UKR)	2:15.78	Rogier Dorsman (NED)	2:20.40
S13	Ihar Boki (BLR)	2:04.19	Kyrylo Garashchecnko (UKR)	2:12.42	Alex Portal (FRA)	2:15.49
S14	Vasyl Krainyk (UKR)	2:12.72	Robert Isak Jonsson (ISL)	2:14.16	Tom Hamer (GBR)	2:14.62
WR world record | AR area record | CR championship record | GR games record | NR national record | OR Olympic record | PB personal best | SB season best | WL world leading (in a given season)

== See also ==
- List of IPC world records in swimming
