= Iceland at the 2016 Summer Paralympics =

- IPC code: ISL
- NPC: National Paralympic Committee of Iceland
- Website: www.ifsport.is

in Rio de Janeiro
- Competitors: 5 in 3 sports
- Flag bearer: Jón Margeir Sverrisson
- Medals: Gold 0 Silver 0 Bronze 0 Total 0

Summer Paralympics appearances (overview)
- 1980; 1984; 1988; 1992; 1996; 2000; 2004; 2008; 2012; 2016; 2020; 2024

Iceland competed at the 2016 Summer Paralympics in Rio de Janeiro, Brazil, from 7 September to 18 September 2016. Jón Margeir Sverrisson earned the top placement of the team with a fourth place in men's 200 m freestyle S14.

== Disability classifications ==
Every participant at the Paralympics has their disability grouped into one of five disability categories; amputation, the condition may be congenital or sustained through injury or illness; cerebral palsy; wheelchair athletes, there is often overlap between this and other categories; visual impairment, including blindness; Les autres, any physical disability that does not fall strictly under one of the other categories, for example dwarfism or multiple sclerosis. Each Paralympic sport then has its own classifications, dependent upon the specific physical demands of competition. Events are given a code, made of numbers and letters, describing the type of event and classification of the athletes competing. Some sports, such as athletics, divide athletes by both the category and severity of their disabilities, other sports, for example swimming, group competitors from different categories together, the only separation being based on the severity of the disability.

== Competitors ==
The following table lists Iceland's delegation per sport and gender.

Sport	Men	Women	Total
Archery	0	1	1
Athletics	1	0	1
Swimming	1	2	3
Total	2	3	5

== Archery ==
Athlete	Event	Ranking round		Round of 32	Round of 16	Quarterfinals	Semifinals	Finals	
Athlete	Event	Score	Seed	Opposition score	Opposition score	Opposition score	Opposition score	Opposition score	Rank
Þorsteinn Halldórsson	Men's individual compound open	599	31	Polish (USA); L 129–143	did not advance				17

== Athletics ==
Athlete	Event	Final	
Athlete	Event	Result	Rank
Helgi Sveinsson	Men's javelin throw F44	53.96	5

== Swimming ==
Men

Athlete	Event	Heat		Final	
Athlete	Event	Result	Rank	Result	Rank
Jón Margeir Sverrisson	200 m freestyle S14	2:00.01	5 Q	1:57.50	4
Jón Margeir Sverrisson	100 m breaststroke SB14	1:12.27	12	did not advance	
Jón Margeir Sverrisson	200 m individual medley SM14	2:19.56	7 Q	2:18.61	6

Women

Athlete	Event	Heat		Final	
Athlete	Event	Result	Rank	Result	Rank
Thelma Björg Björnsdóttir	50 m freestyle S6	42.14	19	did not advance	
Thelma Björg Björnsdóttir	100 m freestyle S6	1:27.04	15	did not advance	
Thelma Björg Björnsdóttir	400 m freestyle S6	6:34.71	14	did not advance	
Thelma Björg Björnsdóttir	100 m breaststroke SB5	1:58.69	11	did not advance	
Thelma Björg Björnsdóttir	200 m individual medley SM6	3:58.13	13	did not advance	
Sonja Sigurðardóttir	50 m freestyle S4	1:03.39	15	did not advance	
Sonja Sigurðardóttir	50 m backstroke S4	1:01.65	8 Q	59.97 NR	8

== See also ==
- Iceland at the 2016 Summer Olympics
