= Iceland at the 2004 Summer Paralympics =

- IPC code: ISL
- NPC: National Paralympic Committee of Iceland
- Website: www.ifsport.is

in Athens
- Competitors: 3 in 3 sports
- Medals Ranked 47th: Gold 1 Silver 3 Bronze 0 Total 4

Summer Paralympics appearances (overview)
- 1980; 1984; 1988; 1992; 1996; 2000; 2004; 2008; 2012; 2016; 2020; 2024

Iceland competed at the 2004 Summer Paralympics in Athens, Greece. The team included three athletes - two men and one woman. Icelandic competitors won four medals, one gold and three silver, to finish 47th in the medal table.

== Medallists ==
Medal	Name	Sport	Event
Gold	Kristín Hákonardóttir	Swimming	Women's 100m backstroke S7
Silver	Jón Halldórsson	Athletics	Men's 100m T35
Silver	Jón Halldórsson	Athletics	Men's 200m T35
Silver	Kristín Hákonardóttir	Swimming	Women's 100m breaststroke SB7

== Sports ==
=== Athletics ===
==== Men's track ====
Athlete	Class	Event	Heats		Semifinal		Final	
Athlete	Class	Event	Result	Rank	Result	Rank	Result	Rank
Jón Halldórsson	T35	100m	13.30	2 Q	—		13.36	2nd place, silver medalist(s)
Jón Halldórsson	T35	200m	—				27.27	2nd place, silver medalist(s)

=== Swimming ===
Athlete	Class	Event	Heats		Final	
Athlete	Class	Event	Result	Rank	Result	Rank
Kristín Hákonardóttir	S7	50m freestyle	35.76	3 Q	34.47	4
Kristín Hákonardóttir	S7	100m freestyle	1:18.81	6 Q	1:17.26	5
Kristín Hákonardóttir	S7	100m backstroke	1:28.50	1 Q	1:25.56 WR	1st place, gold medalist(s)
Kristín Hákonardóttir	SB7	100m breaststroke	1:39.26	1 Q	1:38.84	2nd place, silver medalist(s)

=== Table tennis ===
Athlete	Event	Preliminaries				Quarterfinals	Semifinals	Final / BM	
Athlete	Event	Opposition Result	Opposition Result	Opposition Result	Rank	Opposition Result	Opposition Result	Opposition Result	Rank
Jóhann Kristjánsson	Men's singles 2	Molliens (FRA); L 1–3	Kim (KOR); W 0–3	Minami (JPN); L 0–3	4	did not advance			

== See also ==
- Iceland at the Paralympics
- Iceland at the 2004 Summer Olympics
