= Iceland at the 2018 Winter Paralympics =

- IPC code: ISL
- NPC: National Paralympic Committee of Iceland
- Website: www.ifsport.is

in Pyeongchang
- Competitors: 1 in 1 sport
- Flag bearer: Hilmar Snær Örvarsson
- Medals: Gold 0 Silver 0 Bronze 0 Total 0

Winter Paralympics appearances (overview)
- 1994; 1998–2006; 2010; 2014; 2018; 2022; 2026

Iceland competed at the 2018 Winter Paralympics in Pyeongchang, South Korea, held between 9–18 March 2018. They sent a team of 1 participant in 1 sport.

== Alpine skiing ==
Men

Athlete	Event	Run 1		Run 2		Total	
Athlete	Event	Time	Rank	Time	Rank	Time	Rank
Hilmar Snær Örvarsson	Slalom standing	58.32	17	52.27	7	1:50.59	13
Hilmar Snær Örvarsson	Giant slalom standing	1:15.03	26	1:14.79	20	2:29.82	20

== See also ==
- Iceland at the 2018 Winter Olympics
