= Erna Friðriksdóttir =

Icelandic paralympic skier (born 1987)

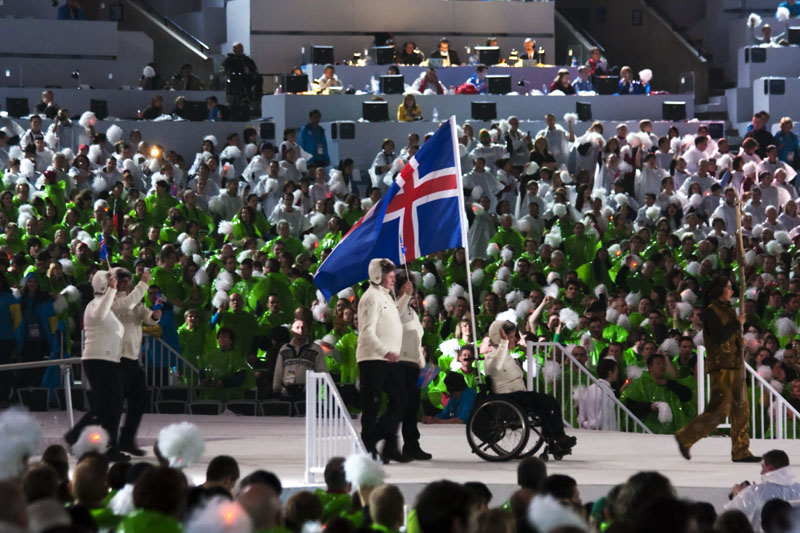
As the flag bearer for Iceland, Erna Friðriksdóttir enters the stadium at the Opening Ceremony of the 2010 Winter Paralympics, on 12 March

Erna Friðriksdóttir (born 2 November 1987) is an Icelandic alpine skier. She competes in Paralympic alpine skiing, in the sitting category, using a monoski.

She qualified to represent Iceland in alpine skiing at the 2010 Winter Paralympics in Vancouver, competing in the women's slalom and the women's giant slalom. She was Iceland's sole representative, and her country's flagbearer during the Games' opening ceremony. This was only Iceland's second participation in the Winter Paralympic Games. For its previous participation, in 1994, it had fielded a single male athlete (Svanur Ingvarsson), in ice sledge speed racing. Erna was thus Iceland's first ever Paralympic alpine skier, and its first female Winter Paralympian.

In Vancouver, competing in the women's slalom, she completed the first run in 2:04.05 (14th and last of those who finished the race), crashed twice during the second and struggled to pick herself up, eventually reaching the finish line. She was, however, recorded as disqualified for her second run.
