= Iceland at the 1994 Winter Paralympics =

- IPC code: ISL
- NPC: National Paralympic Committee of Iceland
- Website: www.ifsport.is

in Lillehammer
- Competitors: 1 in 1 sport
- Medals: Gold 0 Silver 0 Bronze 0 Total 0

Winter Paralympics appearances (overview)
- 1994; 1998–2006; 2010; 2014; 2018; 2022; 2026

Iceland made its Winter Paralympic Games début at the 1994 Winter Paralympics in Lillehammer. The country sent only one competitor, who took part in ice sledge speed racing. He did not win a medal.

Iceland was then absent from the Winter Paralympics for sixteen years (until 2010), although it participated in every edition of the Summer Paralympics in the interval.

== Ice sledge speed racing ==
Svanur Ingvarsson was Iceland's sole representative, and entered four events:

- In the Men's 1000 metres LW10-11, he finished fourth, with a real time of 2:27.73, behind three Norwegian competitors who swept the podium.
- In the Men's 1500 metres LW10-11, he finished sixth with a real time of 3:42.76, behind five Norwegian competitors.
- In the Men's 100 metres LW10-11, he also finished sixth, with a real time of 15.42.
- And in the Men's 500 metres LW10-11, he finished sixth once more, with a real time of 1:14.02.

== See also ==
- Iceland at the 1994 Winter Olympics
- Iceland at the Paralympics
