= Hua Dongdong =

Chinese Paralympic swimmer

Medal record

Representing China

Swimming

Paralympic Games
| Silver medal – second place | 2020 Tokyo | 50m freestyle S11 |
| Silver medal – second place | 2024 Paris | 50m freestyle S11 |
| Bronze medal – third place | 2020 Tokyo | 400m freestyle S11 |

World Championships
| Bronze medal – third place | 2023 Manchester | 50m freestyle S11 |
| Bronze medal – third place | 2023 Manchester | 400m freestyle S11 |

Asian Para Games
| Gold medal – first place | 2022 Hangzhou | 50 m freestyle S11 |
| Silver medal – second place | 2022 Hangzhou | 400 m freestyle S11 |

Hua Dongdong Chinese: 华东东; simplified Chinese: 华东东; traditional Chinese: 華東東; pinyin: Huādōngdōng（华东东）(born 2 August 1999) is a Chinese para-swimmer, who won bronze in the men's 400 metre freestyle S11 event at the 2020 Summer Paralympics.
