= Rogier Dorsman =

Dutch Paralympic swimmer (born 1999)

Personal information
- Nationality: Dutch
- Born: 28 July 1999 (age 27) Heerjansdam, Netherlands

Sport
- Sport: Paralympic swimming
- Disability class: S11, S12
- Club: ZZ & PC De Devel
- Coached by: Sander Nijhuis; Bram Dekker
Medal record
Men's paralympic swimming
Representing Netherlands
Event	1st	2nd	3rd
Paralympics	5	1	0
World Championships	10	8	2
European Championships	0	2	2
Total	15	11	4
Paralympic Games
Gold medal – first place	2020 Tokyo	100 m breaststroke SB11
Gold medal – first place	2020 Tokyo	400 m freestyle S11
Gold medal – first place	2020 Tokyo	200 m ind. medley SM11
Gold medal – first place	2024 Paris	100 m breaststroke SB11
Gold medal – first place	2024 Paris	200 m ind. medley SM11
Silver medal – second place	2024 Paris	400 m freestyle S11
World Championships
Gold medal – first place	2019 London	400 m freestyle S11
Gold medal – first place	2019 London	200 m medley SM11
Gold medal – first place	2022 Madeira	50 m freestyle S11
Gold medal – first place	2022 Madeira	100 m freestyle S11
Gold medal – first place	2022 Madeira	400 m freestyle S11
Gold medal – first place	2022 Madeira	100 m breaststroke SB11
Gold medal – first place	2022 Madeira	200 m ind. medley SM11
Gold medal – first place	2023 Manchester	50 m freestyle S11
Gold medal – first place	2025 Singapore	100 m breaststroke SB11
Gold medal – first place	2023 Manchester	100 m breaststroke SB11
Silver medal – second place	2019 London	100 m backstroke S11
Silver medal – second place	2019 London	100 m breaststroke S11
Silver medal – second place	2022 Madeira	100 m butterfly S11
Silver medal – second place	2022 Madeira	100 m backstroke S11
Silver medal – second place	2023 Manchester	100 m freestyle S11
Silver medal – second place	2023 Manchester	400 m freestyle S11
Silver medal – second place	2023 Manchester	200 m ind. medley SM11
Silver medal – second place	2025 Singapore	200 m ind. medley SM11
Bronze medal – third place	2023 Manchester	100 m backstroke S11
Bronze medal – third place	2025 Singapore	100 m freestyle S11
European Championships
Silver medal – second place	2026 Kocaeli	50 m freestyle S11
Silver medal – second place	2026 Kocaeli	200 m ind. medley SM11
Bronze medal – third place	2018 Dublin	200 m ind. medley S12
Bronze medal – third place	2018 Dublin	400 m freestyle S12

Rogier Dorsman (born 28 July 1999) is a Dutch Paralympic swimmer. He represented the Netherlands at the 2020 and 2024 Summer Paralympics.

== Career ==
Dorsman won gold medals at the 2019 World Para Swimming Championships in the Men's 200m Individual Medley and Men's 400m Freestyle.

Dorsman represented the Netherlands at the 2020 Summer Paralympics and won gold medals in the men's 400 metre freestyle S11, men's 200 metre individual medley SM11 and men's 100 metre breaststroke SB11. He was also the flag bearer for the Netherlands during the closing ceremony of the 2020 Summer Paralympics.
