= Geir Sverrisson =

Icelandic Paralympic athlete

Medal record

Track and field (athletics)

Representing Iceland

Paralympic Games
Silver medal – second place	1996 Atlanta	100 metres - T45-46
Silver medal – second place	1996 Atlanta	200 metres - T45-46
Silver medal – second place	1996 Atlanta	400 metres - T45-46
Bronze medal – third place	1992 Barcelona	100 metres - TS4

Swimming

Representing Iceland

Paralympic Games
Gold medal – first place	1992 Barcelona	100 metre breaststroke - SB9
Silver medal – second place	1988 Seoul	100 metre breaststroke - A8

Geir Sverrisson is a paralympic athlete from Iceland competing mainly in category TS4 sprint events.

Geir competed in four Paralympics, competing in two different sports medaling in both. His first games in 1988 he competed in the swimming events, winning a silver in the 100m breaststroke behind Australian Greg Hammond in a new world record time, he also swam in the 100m freestyle finishing fourth and the 200m medley finishing fifth. At the 1992 Summer Paralympics Geir broke the games record to win the gold in the 100m breaststroke and finished seventh in his heat of the 100m freestyle, he also competed on the track winning a silver in the 100m, finishing fourth in the 200m and 400m. At the 1996 Summer Paralympics Geir competed in just track and field winning three silvers in the 100m, 200m and 400m. Geir also competed in the 2000 Summer Paralympics competing in the same three events he failed to make the final in the 100m and 200m and could only manage seventh.
