= Mykhailo Serbin =

Ukrainian Paralympic swimmer

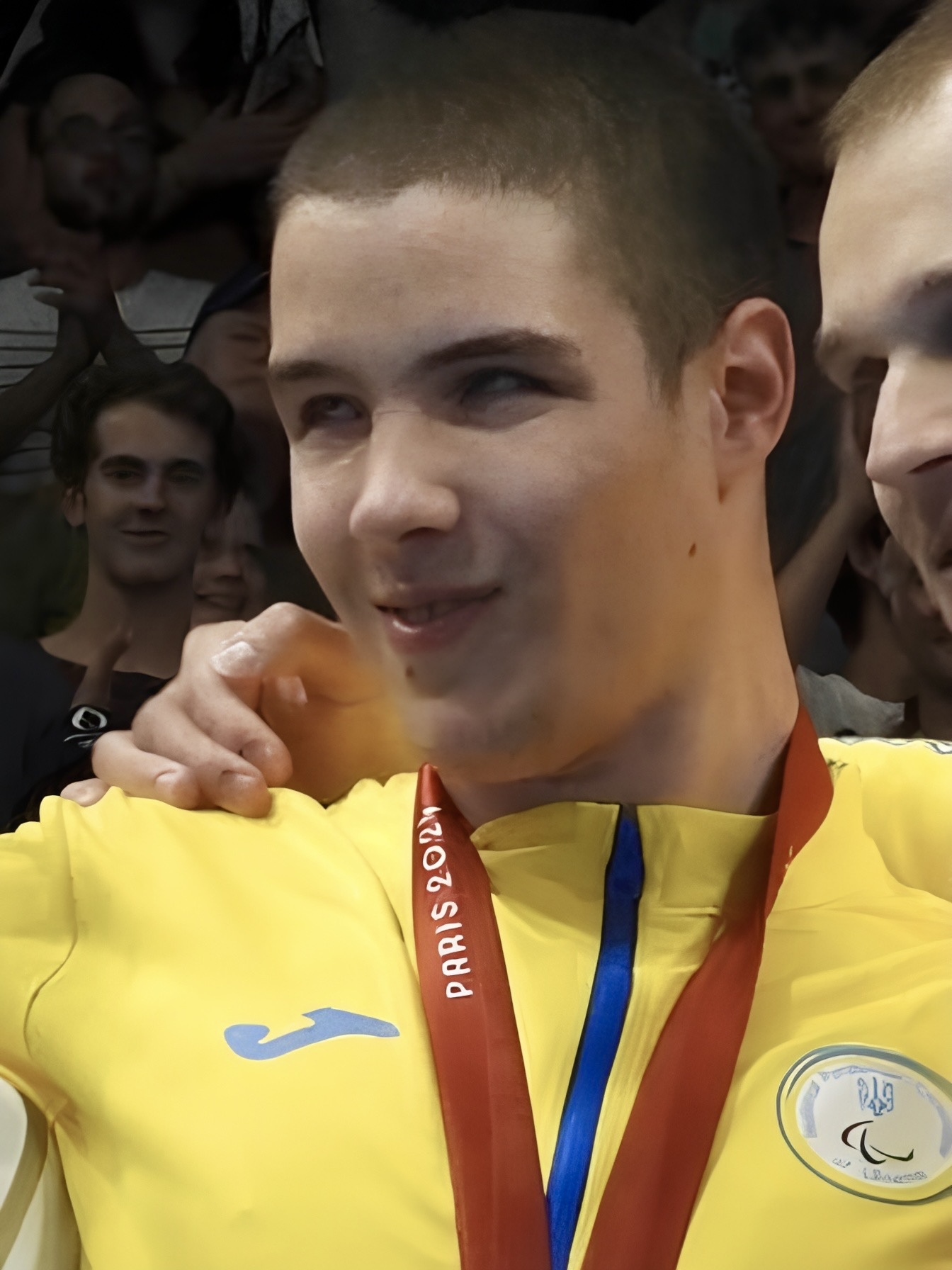
- Serbin at the 2024 Summer Paralympics

Personal information
- Nationality: Ukrainian
- Born: 5 October 2003 (age 22) Kharkiv, Ukraine

Sport
- Sport: Paralympic swimming
- Disability class: S11, SM11
- Club: Invasport
- Coached by: Oksana Vorontsova
Medal record
Men's para swimming
Representing Ukraine
Paralympic Games
Gold medal – first place	2020 Tokyo	100 m backstroke S11
Gold medal – first place	2024 Paris	100 m backstroke S11
Silver medal – second place	2020 Tokyo	200 m ind. medley SM11
World Championships
Gold medal – first place	2022 Madeira	100 m backstroke S11
Gold medal – first place	2023 Manchester	100 m backstroke S11
Silver medal – second place	2022 Madeira	200 m ind. medley SM11
Silver medal – second place	2022 Madeira	400 m freestyle S11
Bronze medal – third place	2022 Madeira	100 m freestyle S11
Bronze medal – third place	2023 Manchester	100 m freestyle S11
Bronze medal – third place	2023 Manchester	200 m ind. medley SM11
European Championships
Silver medal – second place	2020 Funchal	100 m freestyle S11
Bronze medal – third place	2018 Dublin	400 m freestyle S11
Bronze medal – third place	2020 Funchal	50 m freestyle S11
Bronze medal – third place	2024 Madeira	100 m butterfly S11
Bronze medal – third place	2026 Kocaeli	100 m butterfly S11
Bronze medal – third place	2026 Kocaeli	100 m backstroke S11

Mykhailo Serbin (Ukrainian: Михайло Віталійович Сербін; born 5 October 2003) is a Ukrainian Paralympic swimmer. He represented Ukraine at the 2020 and 2024 Summer Paralympics.

== Career ==
Serbin made his international debut for Ukraine at the 2018 World Para Swimming European Championships where he won a bronze medal in the men's 400 metres freestyle S11 event.

Serbin represented Ukraine in the men's 100 metre backstroke S11 event at the 2020 Summer Paralympics and won a gold medal.
