= Haukur Gunnarsson =

Icelandic Paralympic athlete

Medal record

Paralympic athletics

Representing Iceland

Paralympic Games
Gold medal – first place	1988 Seoul	100 metres - C7
Bronze medal – third place	1984 Stoke Mandeville / New York	200 metres - C7
Bronze medal – third place	1984 Stoke Mandeville / New York	400 metres - C7
Bronze medal – third place	1988 Seoul	200 metres - C7
Bronze medal – third place	1988 Seoul	400 metres - C7
Bronze medal – third place	1992 Barcelona	200 metres - C7

Hauker Gunnarsson is a paralympic athlete from Iceland competing mainly in category T36 sprint events.

Hauker competed in four Paralympic games winning a total of six medals. His first games were in 1984 Summer Paralympics where he competed in the long jump, shot put, 100m and won bronze medals in both the 200m and 400m. Four years later in Seoul at the 1988 Summer Paralympics he won bronze again in the 200m and 400m and improved to win gold in the 100m. At the Barcelona games in 1992 he failed to win medals in the 100m or 400m but won a bronze in the 200m. His final games were in 1996 where he competed in the 100m, 200m and long jump but was unable to win any further medals.
