= Már Gunnarsson =

Icelandic paralympic swimmer

Personal information
- Nationality: Icelandic
- Born: 19 November 1999 (age 26) Reykjavík, Iceland

Sport
- Sport: Paralympic swimming
- Disability class: S11 (Visual impairment)
- Event: Backstroke
- Club: Manchester Aquatics Centre
Medal record
Men's Para swimming
Bronze medal – third place	2019 London	100 m Backstroke S11
- Updated on 2025-03-16

Már Gunnarsson (pronounced [ˈmauːr ˈkʏnːar̥sɔn]; born 19 November 1999) is an Icelandic Paralympic swimmer and musician. He competes internationally in para swimming in the S11 classification for athletes with severe visual impairments.

== Early life and education ==
Gunnarsson was born in Reykjavík, Iceland with Leber congenital amaurosis (LCA), resulting in severe visual impairment from birth. At six, his family moved to Luxembourg, where he began classical piano studies under Russian pianist Dina Ziatdinova. Around the age of twelve, he returned to Iceland and started competitive swimming at the local ÍRB club in Reykjanesbær.

In 2022, Gunnarsson moved to Manchester, England, where he currently resides, to study piano and composition at the Royal Northern College of Music (RNCM). His studies coincide with his training at the Manchester Aquatics Centre, located near the RNCM campus.

== Career ==
=== Athletic career ===
Gunnarsson competes internationally as a Paralympic swimmer in the S11 category (athletes with minimal or no sight). In competition, he wears blackened goggles and uses a "tapper"—an assistant who signals turns with a pole—due to his visual impairment.

Before competing at the Paralympics, Gunnarsson participated in multiple major championships, including two European Championships and the 2017 World Championships. His international breakthrough came at the 2019 World Para Swimming Championships in London, where he won bronze in the 100 m backstroke S11.

Prior to the Tokyo Paralympics, Gunnarsson set a world record in the 200 m backstroke S11, an event not contested at the Paralympic Games. At the 2020 Summer Paralympics, he competed in four events: 100 m backstroke S11, 200 m individual medley SM11, 100 m butterfly S11, and 50 m freestyle S11. His highest placement was fifth in the 100 m backstroke S11 final.

Following Tokyo, Gunnarsson initially announced a retirement from swimming due to burnout but later returned with a revised training approach—narrowing his focus to backstroke events while reducing training volume to balance with his music studies.

At the Paris 2024 Paralympic Games, Gunnarsson competed solely in the 100 m backstroke S11, reaching the final and placing seventh while setting a new Icelandic national record. At the Games, he was selected as one of Iceland's flag bearers for the 2024 Summer Paralympics opening ceremony alongside fellow swimmer Sonja Sigurðardóttir.

Notable competitive results
Year	Competition	Location	Event	Result
2019	World Para Swimming Championships	(United Kingdom) London, England	100 m backstroke S11	Bronze
2021	2020 Summer Paralympics	Tokyo, Japan	100 m backstroke S11	5th
2021	2020 Summer Paralympics	Tokyo, Japan	200 m individual medley SM11	8th
2024	2024 Summer Paralympics	Paris, France	100 m backstroke S11	7th

=== Music career ===
Gunnarsson studies at the Royal Northern College of Music in Manchester, focusing on piano and composition.

In 2022, Gunnarsson and his sister, Ísold Wilberg, participated in Söngvakeppnin, the Icelandic national selection for the Eurovision Song Contest, finishing third with the song "Don't You Know?", which he co-wrote.

In 2024, for the Paris Paralympics, he recorded and released the orchestral piece "Spirit in Motion", titled after the Paralympic motto. The piece was recorded with a symphony orchestra in Manchester and was inspired by his experiences as an athlete.

Gunnarsson has also won the Lions World Song Festival for the Blind, a global music competition for visually impaired musicians.

== Advocacy and personal life ==
Gunnarsson has advocated for improved accessibility, particularly regarding international travel with service animals. After encountering bureaucratic difficulties when travelling between the UK and Iceland with his guide dog Max due to post‑Brexit regulations, he spoke publicly about these challenges to raise awareness.

He is openly gay, having come out publicly after the 2020 Summer Paralympics.

Following the Tokyo Paralympics, Gunnarsson worked as a television presenter for the Icelandic national broadcaster RÚV, and toured Iceland giving motivational talks in schools.

Domestically, Gunnarsson has been recognised for his achievements by being named Icelandic Athlete of the Year among athletes with disabilities (Íþróttamaður fatlaðra) in both 2019 and 2021.
