= China at the 2024 Summer Paralympics =

- Flag of China
- IPC code: CHN
- NPC: China Administration of Sports for Persons with Disabilities
- Website: www.caspd.org.cn

in Paris, France 28 August 2024 – 8 September 2024
- Competitors: 284 in 19 sports
- Flag bearers (opening): Gu Haiyan; Qi Yongkai
- Flag bearers (closing): Jiang Yuyan; Di Dongdong
- Medals Ranked 1st: Gold 94 Silver 76 Bronze 50 Total 220

Summer Paralympics appearances (overview)
- 1984; 1988; 1992; 1996; 2000; 2004; 2008; 2012; 2016; 2020; 2024

China competed at the 2024 Summer Paralympics in Paris, France, from 28 August to 8 September 2024. This is their eleventh consecutive appearance at the Summer Paralympics since 1984.

China sent 284 athletes to the Games in every single sport except equestrian, paratriathlon and wheelchair rugby.

== Medalists ==
Medal	Name	Sport	Event	Date
Gold	Li Zhangyu	Cycling	Men's pursuit C1	29 August
Gold	Wang Xiaomei	Cycling	Women's pursuit C1–3	29 August
Gold	Jiang Yuyan	Swimming	Women's 50 metre freestyle S6	29 August
Gold	Chen Yi	Swimming	Women's 50 metre freestyle S10	29 August
Gold	Zhou Xia	Athletics	Women's 100 metres T35	30 August
Gold	Yang Hong	Swimming	Men's 200 metre individual medley SM6	30 August
Gold	Di Dongdong	Athletics	Men's long jump T11	30 August
Gold	Guo Jincheng; He Shenggao; Lu Dong; Wang Lichao	Swimming	Mixed 4 × 50 metre freestyle relay 20 points	30 August
Gold	Wen Xiaoyan	Athletics	Women's 200 metres T37	30 August
Gold	Huang Wenjuan; Jin Yucheng	Table tennis	Women's doubles WD14	30 August
Gold	Liu Jing; Xue Juan	Table tennis	Women's doubles WD5	30 August
Gold	Li Yujie	Taekwondo	Women's 57 kg	30 August
Gold	Zhao Yuping	Athletics	Women's javelin throw F13	31 August
Gold	Chen Minyi	Archery	Women's individual W1	31 August
Gold	Cao Ningning; Feng Panfeng	Table tennis	Men's doubles MD8	31 August
Gold	Li Zhangyu	Cycling	Men's time trial C1–3	31 August
Gold	Zhao Shuai; Mao Jingdian	Table tennis	Mixed doubles XD17	31 August
Gold	Li Yingli	Athletics	Women's shot put F37	31 August
Gold	Gu Xiaodan; Pan Jiamin	Table tennis	Women's doubles WD10	31 August
Gold	Ma Jia	Swimming	Women's 50 metre freestyle S11	31 August
Gold	Yang Yue	Athletics	Women's discus throw F64	1 September
Gold	Feng Panfeng; Zhou Ying	Table tennis	Mixed doubles XD7	1 September
Gold	Liao Keli; Yan Shuo	Table tennis	Men's doubles MD14	1 September
Gold	Shi Yiting	Athletics	Women's 200 metres T36	1 September
Gold	Yang Hong	Swimming	Men's 100 metre breaststroke SB6	1 September
Gold	Xu Haijiao	Swimming	Men's 200 metre individual medley SM8	1 September
Gold	Cai Liwen	Swimming	Women's 100 metre backstroke S11	1 September
Gold	Zou Lijuan	Athletics	Women's javelin throw F34	1 September
Gold	Zhou Xia	Athletics	Women's 200 metres T35	1 September
Gold	Dai Yunqiang	Athletics	Men's 400 metres T54	1 September
Gold	Liu Yutong; Yin Menglu	Badminton	Women's doubles WH1–2	1 September
Gold	Wen Xiaoyan	Athletics	Women's long jump T37	1 September
Gold	Mai Jianpeng; Qu Zimo	Badminton	Men's doubles WH1–2	1 September
Gold	Xiao Zuxian	Badminton	Women's singles SL3	2 September
Gold	Lin Naili; Li Fengmei	Badminton	Mixed doubles SH6	2 September
Gold	Zhang Tianxin; Chen Minyi	Archery	Mixed team W1	2 September
Gold	Cheng Hefang	Badminton	Women's singles SL4	2 September
Gold	Lin Ximei	Boccia	Women's individual BC4	2 September
Gold	Yang Qiuxia	Badminton	Women's singles SU5	2 September
Gold	Liu Yutong	Badminton	Women's singles WH2	2 September
Gold	Qu Zimo	Badminton	Men's singles WH1	2 September
Gold	Yang Chao	Shooting	Mixed 25 metre pistol SH1	2 September
Gold	Li Fengmei	Badminton	Women's singles SH6	2 September
Gold	Zou Lijuan	Athletics	Women's shot put F34	3 September
Gold	Zhang Liangmin	Athletics	Women's discus throw F11	3 September
Gold	Wang Jingang	Swimming	Men's 50 metre butterfly S6	3 September
Gold	Jiang Yuyan	Swimming	Women's 50 metre butterfly S6	3 September
Gold	Yuan Weiyi	Swimming	Men's 50 metre backstroke S5	3 September
Gold	Lu Dong	Swimming	Women's 50 metre backstroke S5	3 September
Gold	Wu Chunyan	Archery	Women's individual recurve open	3 September
Gold	Jin Hua	Athletics	Men's 1500 metres T54	3 September
Gold	Feng Yanke	Wheelchair fencing	Men's sabre B	3 September
Gold	Gu Haiyan	Wheelchair fencing	Women's sabre A	3 September
Gold	Chen Jianxin	Cycling	Men's road time trial T1–2	4 September
Gold	Yang Chao	Shooting	Mixed 50 metre pistol SH1	4 September
Gold	Cui Zhe	Powerlifting	Women's 41 kg	4 September
Gold	Guo Lingling	Powerlifting	Women's 45 kg	4 September
Gold	Shi Yiting	Athletics	Women's 100 metres T36	4 September
Gold	Jiang Yuyan	Swimming	Women's 100 metre freestyle S7	4 September
Gold	Zhang Bian	Table tennis	Women's singles WS5	4 September
Gold	Sun Gang	Wheelchair fencing	Men's foil A	4 September
Gold	Zou Xufeng	Wheelchair fencing	Women's foil A	4 September
Gold	Wen Xiaoyan	Athletics	Women's 100 metres T37	5 September
Gold	Yao Juan	Athletics	Women's shot put F64	5 September
Gold	Lan Zhijian; Yan Zhiqiang; Zhang Qi	Boccia	Mixed team BC1/BC2	5 September
Gold	Shi Yijie	Judo	Women's 57 kg J1	5 September
Gold	Guo Jincheng	Swimming	Men's 50 metre freestyle S5	5 September
Gold	Feng Panfeng	Table tennis	Men's singles MS3	5 September
Gold	Zou Yi	Powerlifting	Men's 65 kg	5 September
Gold	Jiang Yuyan; Wang Jingang; Yao Cuan; Zou Liankang	Swimming	Mixed 4 × 50 metre medley relay 20 points	5 September
Gold	Wu Qing	Athletics	Women's shot put F33	5 September
Gold	Jin Hua	Athletics	Men's 800 metres T54	5 September
Gold	Chen Yuandong; Gu Haiyan; Xiao Rong; Zou Xufeng	Wheelchair fencing	Women's foil team	5 September
Gold	Feng Yanke; Sun Gang; Tian Jianquan; Zhong Saichun	Wheelchair fencing	Men's foil team	5 September
Gold	Tan Yujiao	Powerlifting	Women's 67 kg	6 September
Gold	Liu Li	Judo	Women's 70 kg J1	6 September
Gold	Jiang Yuyan	Swimming	Women's 400 metre freestyle S6	6 September
Gold	Guo Jincheng	Swimming	Men's 50 metre butterfly S5	6 September
Gold	Lu Dong	Swimming	Women's 50 metre butterfly S5	6 September
Gold	Yan Shuo	Table tennis	Men's singles MS7	6 September
Gold	Hu Yang; Wang Hao; Wen Xiaoyan; Zhou Guohua	Athletics	Mixed 4 × 100 metres relay	6 September
Gold	Sun Gang	Wheelchair fencing	Men's épée A	6 September
Gold	Chen Yuandong	Wheelchair fencing	Women's épée A	6 September
Gold	Chen Jianxin	Cycling	Men's road race T1–2	7 September
Gold	Yan Panpan	Powerlifting	Men's 88 kg	7 September
Gold	Huang Wenjuan	Table tennis	Women's singles WS8	7 September
Gold	Han Miaoyu	Powerlifting	Women's 79 kg	7 September
Gold	Zhang Meng	Swimming	Women's 200 metre individual medley SM10	7 September
Gold	Yang Hong	Swimming	Men's 100 metre backstroke S6	7 September
Gold	Jiang Yuyan	Swimming	Women's 100 metre backstroke S6	7 September
Gold	Cai Bingchen	Athletics	Men's shot put F33	7 September
Gold	He Shenggao	Swimming	Women's 200 metre individual medley SM5	7 September
Gold	Chen Yuandong; Gu Haiyan; Kang Su; Zou Xufeng	Wheelchair fencing	Women's épée team	7 September
Gold	Sun Gang; Tian Jianquan; Zhang Jie; Zhong Saichun	Wheelchair fencing	Men's épée team	7 September
Silver	Liang Weicong	Cycling	Men's pursuit C1	29 August
Silver	Dong Feixia	Athletics	Women's discus throw F55	30 August
Silver	Zhou Guohua	Athletics	Women's long jump T11	30 August
Silver	Guo Qianqian	Athletics	Women's 100 metres T35	30 August
Silver	Guo Jincheng	Swimming	Men's 100 metre freestyle S5	30 August
Silver	Zhang Xiaotong	Swimming	Women's 400 metre freestyle S11	30 August
Silver	Chen Shichang	Athletics	Men's long jump T11	30 August
Silver	Zhang Meng	Swimming	Women's 100 metre breaststroke SB9	30 August
Silver	Yang Guanglong	Swimming	Men's 100 metre breaststroke SB8	30 August
Silver	Xu Mian	Athletics	Women's discus throw F57	31 August
Silver	Qian Wangwei	Cycling	Women's time trial C1–3	31 August
Silver	Liang Weicong	Cycling	Men's time trial C1–3	31 August
Silver	Peng Weinan; Xiong Guiyan	Table tennis	Mixed doubles XD17	31 August
Silver	Mi Na	Athletics	Women's shot put F37	31 August
Silver	Hua Dongdong	Swimming	Men's 50 metre freestyle S11	31 August
Silver	Liu Chaodong; Zhao Yiqing	Table tennis	Men's doubles MD18	1 September
Silver	Yao Juan	Athletics	Women's discus throw F64	1 September
Silver	Jiang Jijian; Liu Shuang	Rowing	Mixed double sculls	1 September
Silver	Han Guifei	Archery	Men's individual W1	1 September
Silver	Liu Daomin	Swimming	Women's 100 metre breaststroke SB6	1 September
Silver	Yang Guanglong	Swimming	Men's 200 metre individual medley SM8	1 September
Silver	Li Guizhi	Swimming	Women's 100 metre backstroke S11	1 September
Silver	Zhou Zhaoqian	Athletics	Women's 800 metres T54	1 September
Silver	Zuo Caiyun	Athletics	Women's javelin throw F34	1 September
Silver	Zhang Li	Swimming	Women's 100 metre breaststroke SB5	1 September
Silver	Guo Qianqian	Athletics	Women's 200 metres T35	1 September
Silver	Ai Xinliang	Archery	Men's individual compound open	1 September
Silver	He Shanshan	Athletics	Women's 1500 metres T11	2 September
Silver	Li Hongyan	Badminton	Women's singles WH2	2 September
Silver	Lin Shuangbao	Badminton	Women's singles SH6	2 September
Silver	Wang Hao	Athletics	Men's long jump T47	3 September
Silver	Dong Chao	Shooting	Men's 50 metre rifle 3 positions SH1	3 September
Silver	Liu Daomin	Swimming	Women's 50 metre butterfly S6	3 September
Silver	Guo Jincheng	Swimming	Men's 50 metre backstroke S5	3 September
Silver	He Shenggao	Swimming	Women's 50 metre backstroke S5	3 September
Silver	Ma Jia	Swimming	Women's 200 metre individual medley SM11	3 September
Silver	Wu Yang	Archery	Women's individual recurve open	3 September
Silver	Liu Cuiqing	Athletics	Women's 100 metres T11	3 September
Silver	Jiang Fenfen	Athletics	Women's 400 metres T37	3 September
Silver	Xiao Rong	Wheelchair fencing	Women's sabre B	3 September
Silver	Zhong Huanghao	Athletics	Men's long jump T38	4 September
Silver	Feng Yanke	Wheelchair fencing	Men's foil B	4 September
Silver	Pan Jiamin	Table tennis	Women's singles WS5	4 September
Silver	Xiao Rong	Wheelchair fencing	Women's foil B	4 September
Silver	Lian Hao	Table tennis	Men's singles MS10	4 September
Silver	Gu Haiyan	Wheelchair fencing	Women's foil A	4 September
Silver	Wang Jun	Athletics	Women's shot put F35	5 September
Silver	Xu Mian	Athletics	Women's shot put F57	5 September
Silver	Xiao Jinping	Powerlifting	Women's 50 kg	5 September
Silver	Sun Bianbian	Cycling	Women's road race H5	5 September
Silver	Qi Yongkai	Powerlifting	Men's 59 kg	5 September
Silver	Yuan Weiyi	Swimming	Men's 50 metre freestyle S5	5 September
Silver	Yang Bozun	Swimming	Men's 100 metre breaststroke SB11	5 September
Silver	Ma Jia	Swimming	Women's 100 metre breaststroke SB11	5 September
Silver	Dai Yunqiang	Athletics	Men's 800 metres T54	5 September
Silver	Hu Peng	Powerlifting	Men's 72 kg	6 September
Silver	Cui Jianjin	Powerlifting	Women's 61 kg	6 September
Silver	Wang Yue	Judo	Women's 70 kg J2	6 September
Silver	Yuan Weiyi	Swimming	Men's 50 metre butterfly S5	6 September
Silver	He Shenggao	Swimming	Women's 50 metre butterfly S5	6 September
Silver	Liu Jing	Table tennis	Women's singles WS1–2	6 September
Silver	Gu Xiaofei	Powerlifting	Men's 80 kg	6 September
Silver	Kang Su	Wheelchair fencing	Women's épée B	6 September
Silver	Li Yingli	Athletics	Women's discus throw F38	6 September
Silver	Zhao Shuai	Table tennis	Men's singles MS8	7 September
Silver	Wang Jingang	Swimming	Men's 100 metre backstroke S6	7 September
Silver	Wu Hongliang	Swimming	Men's 100 metre butterfly S8	7 September
Silver	Ye Jixiong	Powerlifting	Men's 97 kg	7 September
Silver	Sun Pengxiang	Athletics	Men's javelin throw F41	7 September
Silver	Liu Cuiqing	Athletics	Women's 200 metres T11	7 September
Silver	China women's national sitting volleyball team: Lyu Hongqin; Zhao Meiling; Qiu Junfei; Zhang Xufei; Li Ting; Huang Lu; Wang Yanan; Zhang Lijun; Su Limei; Tang Xuemei; Xu Yixiao; Hu Huizi	Sitting volleyball	Women's tournament	7 September
Silver	Lu Dong	Swimming	Women's 200 metre individual medley SM5	7 September
Silver	Xiong Guiyan	Table tennis	Women's singles WS9	7 September
Silver	Jin Hua	Athletics	Men's marathon T54	8 September
Silver	Zheng Feifei	Powerlifting	Women's 86 kg	8 September
Silver	Deng Xuemei	Powerlifting	Women's +86 kg	8 September
Bronze	An Dongquan	Athletics	Men's javelin throw F38	30 August
Bronze	Yang Chao	Shooting	Men's 10 metre air pistol SH1	30 August
Bronze	Liu Daomin	Swimming	Women's 200 metre individual medley SM6	30 August
Bronze	Jiang Fenfen	Athletics	Women's 200 metres T37	30 August
Bronze	Zhai Xiang; Gu Xiaodan	Table tennis	Mixed doubles XD7	31 August
Bronze	Lian Hao; Zhao Shuai	Table tennis	Men's doubles MD18	31 August
Bronze	He Shanshan	Athletics	Women's 400 metres T11	31 August
Bronze	Zhang Tianxin	Archery	Men's individual W1	1 September
Bronze	Zhou Hongzhuan	Athletics	Women's 800 metres T53	1 September
Bronze	Lan Hanyu	Athletics	Women's 100 metres T34	1 September
Bronze	He Zihao	Archery	Men's individual compound open	1 September
Bronze	Yin Menglu	Badminton	Women's singles WH1	2 September
Bronze	Huang Jun	Athletics	Men's shot put F41	2 September
Bronze	Cheng Jiao	Swimming	Women's 100 metre breaststroke SB4	2 September
Bronze	Lin Sitong	Athletics	Women's javelin throw F56	3 September
Bronze	Xue Enhui	Athletics	Women's discus throw F11	3 September
Bronze	Zhang Cuiping	Shooting	Women's 50 metre rifle 3 positions SH1	3 September
Bronze	Wang Lichao	Swimming	Men's 50 metre backstroke S5	3 September
Bronze	Liu Yu	Swimming	Women's 50 metre backstroke S5	3 September
Bronze	Cai Liwen	Swimming	Women's 200 metre individual medley SM11	3 September
Bronze	Dai Yunqiang	Athletics	Men's 1500 metres T54	3 September
Bronze	Zhang Jie	Wheelchair fencing	Men's sabre B	3 September
Bronze	Sun Bianbian	Cycling	Women's road time trial H4–5	4 September
Bronze	Hu Daoliang	Wheelchair fencing	Men's foil B	4 September
Bronze	Yang Jinglang	Powerlifting	Men's 54 kg	4 September
Bronze	Zhong Saichun	Wheelchair fencing	Men's foil A	4 September
Bronze	Gao Fang	Athletics	Women's 100 metres T53	4 September
Bronze	Wang Rui	Table tennis	Women's singles WS7	5 September
Bronze	Yang Yue	Athletics	Women's shot put F64	5 September
Bronze	Guo Luoyao; Wang Ziying	Wheelchair tennis	Women's doubles	5 September
Bronze	China women's national goalball team: Zhang Xiling; Chao Zhenhua; Xu Miao; Wang Chunyan; Ke Peiying; Wang Chunhua	Goalball	Women's tournament	5 September
Bronze	Li Liqing	Judo	Women's 48 kg J2	5 September
Bronze	Wang Lichao	Swimming	Men's 50 metre freestyle S5	5 September
Bronze	Di Dongdong	Athletics	Men's 100 metres T11	5 September
Bronze	Zhou Hongzhuan	Athletics	Women's 400 metres T53	5 September
Bronze	Zheng Jietong	Swimming	Women's 100 metre breaststroke SB12	5 September
Bronze	Zhou Zhaoqian	Athletics	Women's 400 metres T54	5 September
Bronze	Zhao Yuping	Athletics	Women's shot put F12	6 September
Bronze	Xue Juan	Table tennis	Women's singles WS3	6 September
Bronze	Wang Lichao	Swimming	Men's 50 metre butterfly S5	6 September
Bronze	Gu Haiyan	Wheelchair fencing	Women's épée A	6 September
Bronze	Zhou Ying	Table tennis	Women's singles WS4	7 September
Bronze	Gu Xiaodan	Table tennis	Women's singles WS4	7 September
Bronze	Yang Yifei	Athletics	Men's 100 metres T36	7 September
Bronze	Zhong Yongyuan	Paracanoeing	Women's VL3	7 September
Bronze	Wang Hongyu	Judo	Women's +70 kg J2	7 September
Bronze	Yang Guanglong	Swimming	Men's 100 metre butterfly S8	7 September
Bronze	Zhang Xiaotong	Swimming	Women's 100 metre freestyle S11	7 September
Bronze	Cheng Jiao	Swimming	Women's 200 metre individual medley SM5	7 September
Bronze	China women's national wheelchair basketball team: Xuejing Chen; Xuemei Zhang; Tonglei Zhang; Guidi Lyu; Suiling Lin; Xiaolian Huang; Jingwen Chen; Qiaoling Qiu; Meimei Zhang; Yun Long; Jiameng Dai; Xiang He	Wheelchair basketball	Women's tournament	8 September

Medals by sport
Sport	1st place, gold medalist(s)	2nd place, silver medalist(s)	3rd place, bronze medalist(s)	Total
Swimming	22	21	11	54
Athletics	21	22	16	59
Table tennis	11	7	6	24
Wheelchair fencing	10	5	4	19
Badminton	9	2	1	12
Powerlifting	6	8	1	15
Cycling	5	4	1	10
Archery	3	3	2	8
Judo	2	1	2	5
Shooting	2	1	2	5
Boccia	2	0	0	2
Taekwondo	1	0	0	1
Rowing	0	1	0	1
Sitting volleyball	0	1	0	1
Goalball	0	0	1	1
Paracanoeing	0	0	1	1
Wheelchair basketball	0	0	1	1
Wheelchair tennis	0	0	1	1
Total	94	76	50	220

Medals by day
Day	Date	1st place, gold medalist(s)	2nd place, silver medalist(s)	3rd place, bronze medalist(s)	Total
1	August 29	4	1	0	5
2	August 30	8	8	4	20
3	August 31	8	6	3	17
4	September 1	13	12	4	29
5	September 2	10	3	3	16
6	September 3	10	10	8	28
7	September 4	9	6	5	20
8	September 5	12	9	10	31
9	September 6	9	9	4	22
10	September 7	11	9	8	28
11	September 8	0	3	1	4
Total		94	76	50	220

Medals by gender
Gender	1st place, gold medalist(s)	2nd place, silver medalist(s)	3rd place, bronze medalist(s)	Total
Female	54	45	32	131
Male	30	29	17	76
Mixed	10	2	1	13
Total	94	76	50	220

== Competitors ==
Sport	Men	Women	Total
Archery	6	6	12
Athletics	20	31	51
Badminton	5	8	13
Blind football	9	—N/a	9
Boccia	3	2	5
Cycling	4	4	8
Goalball	6	6	12
Judo	1	6	7
Paracanoeing	2	3	5
Powerlifting	8	8	16
Rowing	3	4	7
Shooting	4	3	9
Sitting volleyball	0	12	12
Swimming	7	10	17
Table tennis	10	11	21
Taekwondo	1	3	4
Wheelchair basketball	0	12	12
Wheelchair fencing	6	6	12
Wheelchair tennis	3	4	7
Total	126	158	284

== Archery ==
China entered twelve archers in all event by virtue of their result at the 2023 World Para Archery Championships in Plzeň, Czech Republic and 2023 Asian Championships in Hangzhou.

Men

Athlete	Event	Ranking Round		Round of 32	Round of 16	Quarterfinals	Semifinals	Finals	
Athlete	Event	Score	Seed	Opposition Score	Opposition Score	Opposition Score	Opposition Score	Opposition Score	Rank
Han Guifei	Individual W1	655	5	—N/a	Park (KOR); W 140–130	Gàsper (HUN); W 137–134	Zhang (CHN); W 135–133	Tabanshky (USA); L 131–134	2nd place, silver medalist(s)
Zhang Tianxin	Individual W1	674	1	—N/a	Bye	Anderson (RSA); W 136–134	Han (CHN); L 133–135	Tanon (ITA); W 138–116	3rd place, bronze medalist(s)
Ai Xinliang	Individual compound	709	1	Quesada (CRC); W DNS	Guerin (FRA); W 144–139	Montagn (BEL); W 148–140	R. Kumar (IND); W 145–143	Stutzman (USA); L 147–149	2nd place, silver medalist(s)
He Zihao	Individual compound	704	2	Govinda Rajan (MAS); W 144–142	Singpirom (THA); W 146–142	Polish (USA); W 147–146	Stutzman (USA); L 148–148 SO	R. Kumar (IND); W 147–146	3rd place, bronze medalist(s)
Gan Jun	Individual recurve	636	10	Kenton-Smith (AUS); L 2–6	Did not advance				17
Zhao Lixue	Individual recurve	617	14	Ivan (SVK); W 6–4	Naumchuk (UKR); W 6–0	Ciszek (POL); L 4–6	Did not advance		6

Women

Athlete	Event	Ranking Round		Round of 32	Round of 16	Quarterfinals	Semifinals	Finals	
Athlete	Event	Score	Seed	Opposition Score	Opposition Score	Opposition Score	Opposition Score	Opposition Score	Rank
Chen Minyi	Individual W1	650	2	—N/a	Bye	Otto (USA); W 124–107	Kim (KOR); W 132–123	Musilová (CZE); W 136–129	1st place, gold medalist(s)
Liu Jing	Individual W1	608	7	—N/a	Otto (USA); L113–118	Did not advance			9
Lin Yueshan	Individual compound	670	14	Jeong (KOR); W 140–134	Hemmati (IRI); L 138–142	Did not advance			9
Zhou Jiamin	Individual compound	676	12	Leonard (IRL); W 140–135	Gögel (BRA); L 136–139	Did not advance			9
Wu Chunyan	Individual recurve	630	2	Bye	Buyanjargal (MGL); W 6–0	Jatyan (IND); W 6–4	Demberel (MGL); W 6–4	Wu (CHN); W 7–1	1st place, gold medalist(s)
Wu Yang	Individual recurve	603	4	Bye	Pattawaeo (THA); W 6–0	Rahimi (IRI); W 6–0	Mijjno (ITA); W 6–4	Chunyan (CHN); L 1–7	2nd place, silver medalist(s)

Mixed

Athlete	Event	Ranking Round		Round of 16	Quarterfinals	Semifinals	Finals	
Athlete	Event	Score	Seed	Opposition Score	Opposition Score	Opposition Score	Opposition Score	Rank
Zhang Tianxin; Chen Minyi	Team W1	1324	1	—N/a	Bye	South Korea (KOR); W 145–139	Czech Republic (CZE); W 147–143	1st place, gold medalist(s)
Zhou Jiamin; Ai Xinliang	Team compound	1385	3	Bye	Italy (ITA); L 151–151 SO	Did not advance		
Gan Jun; Wu Chunyan	Team recurve	1266	2	Bye	Slovenia (SLO); L 4–5	Did not advance		

== Athletics ==
Chinese track and field athletes achieved quota places for the following events based on their results at the 2023 World Championships, 2024 World Championships, or through high performance allocation, as long as they meet the minimum entry standard (MES).

Key

- Note–Ranks given for track events are within the athlete's heat only
- Q = Qualified for the next round
- q = Qualified for the next round as a fastest loser or, in field events, by position without achieving the qualifying target
- DQ = Disqualified
- PR = Paralympic Record
- AR = Area (or continental) Record
- NR = National Record
- SB = Season's Best
- N/A = Round not applicable for the event
- Bye = Athlete not required to compete in round

=== Track & road events ===
Men

Athlete	Event	Heat		Semifinal		Final	
Athlete	Event	Result	Rank	Result	Rank	Result	Rank
Di Dongdong	100 m T11	11.24	1 Q	11.13	1 Q	11.08	3rd place, bronze medalist(s)
Ye Tao	100 m T11	11.56	2 Q	11.50	3	Did not advance	
Wang Yang	100 m T34	15.86	4	—N/a		Did not advance	
Gong Wenhao	100 m T34	15.81	5 Q	—N/a		15.67	8
Yang Yifei	100 m T36	11.88	1 Q	—N/a		11.88 (.877)	3rd place, bronze medalist(s)
Deng Peicheng	100 m T36	12.13	2 Q	—N/a		12.00	5
Zhou Peng	100 m T38	—N/a				11.94	9
Wang Hao	100 m T47	10.90	3 Q	—N/a		10.81	4
Hu Yang	100 m T54	14.24	3 Q	—N/a		14.14	4
Zhang Ying	100 m T54	14.10	3 Q	—N/a		14.28	6
Di Dongdong	400 m T11	57.70	3	Did not advance			
Dai Yunqiang	400 m T54	45.52	2 Q	—N/a		44.55	1st place, gold medalist(s)
Hu Yang	400 m T54	46.34	3 Q	—N/a		46.06	6
Zhang Ying	400 m T54	47.41	4	—N/a		Did not advance	
Wang Yang	800 m T34	1:38.57	1 Q	—N/a		1:40.14	4
Gong Wenhao	800 m T34	1:46.19	4	—N/a		Did not advance	
Jin Hua	800 m T54	1:31.50	1 Q	—N/a		1:28.20	1st place, gold medalist(s)
Dai Yunqiang	800 m T54	1:33.73	4 Q	—N/a		1:29.94	2nd place, silver medalist(s)
Hu Yang	800 m T54	1:36.00	3 Q	—N/a		1:31.89	8
Jin Hua	1500 m T54	2:56.05	1 Q	—N/a		2:49.93	1st place, gold medalist(s)
Dai Yunqiang	1500 m T54	2:57.28	2 Q	—N/a		2:53.54	3rd place, bronze medalist(s)
Luo Xingchuan	1500 m T54	3:05.19	3 Q	—N/a		2:53.90	6
Ma Zhuo	5000 m T54	11:18.79	4 Q	—N/a		10:56.20	4
Luo Xingchuan	5000 m T54	11:18.71	4 Q	—N/a		10:56.48	6
Jin Hua	Marathon T54	—N/a				1:31:19	2nd place, silver medalist(s)
Ma Zhuo	Marathon T54	—N/a				1:36:20	6
Luo Xingchuan	Marathon T54	—N/a				DNF	

Women

Athlete	Event	Heat		Semifinal		Final	
Athlete	Event	Result	Rank	Result	Rank	Result	Rank
Liu Cuiqing	100 m T11	12.15	1 Q	12.06	2 Q	12.04	2nd place, silver medalist(s)
Zhou Guohua	100 m T11	12.28	1 Q	12.25	3	Did not advance	
Shen Yaqin	100 m T12	12.78	3	Did not advance			
Lan Hanyu	100 m T34	18.73	2 Q	—N/a		18.45	3rd place, bronze medalist(s)
Liu Panpan	100 m T34	20.46	4	—N/a		Did not advance	
Zhou Xia	100 m T35	—N/a				13.58	1st place, gold medalist(s)
Guo Qianqian	100 m T35	—N/a				13.74	2nd place, silver medalist(s)
Shi Yiting	100 m T36	14.28	1 Q	—N/a		13.39	1st place, gold medalist(s)
Wen Xiaoyan	100 m T37	12.86	1 Q	—N/a		12.52	1st place, gold medalist(s)
Jiang Fenfen	100 m T37	13.40	2 Q	—N/a		13.34	4
Chen Zimo	100 m T38	12.97	6	—N/a		Did not advance	
Li Lu	100 m T47	12.87	6	—N/a		Did not advance	
Gao Fang	100 m T53	—N/a				16.16	3rd place, bronze medalist(s)
Zhou Hongzhuan	100 m T53	—N/a				16.49	4
Zhou Zhaoqian	100 m T54	16.57	4 Q	—N/a		16.44	5
Liu Cuiqing	200 m T11	24.77	1 Q	—N/a		24.86	2nd place, silver medalist(s)
Shen Yaqin	200 m T12	27.27	3	—N/a		Did not advance	
Zhou Xia	200 m T35	—N/a				28.15	1st place, gold medalist(s)
Guo Qianqian	200 m T35	—N/a				29.09	2nd place, silver medalist(s)
Shi Yiting	200 m T36	28.87	1 Q	—N/a		27.50	1st place, gold medalist(s)
Wen Xiaoyan	200 m T37	—N/a				25.86	1st place, gold medalist(s)
Jiang Fenfen	200 m T37	—N/a				27.55	3rd place, bronze medalist(s)
Li Lu	200 m T47	26.51	2 Q	—N/a		26.66	8
Liu Cuiqing	400 m T11	59.09	1 Q	1:00.13	2	Did not advance	
He Shanshan	400 m T11	58.86	2 Q	58.82	2 Q	58.25	3rd place, bronze medalist(s)
Shen Yaqin	400 m T12	1:01.11	3	—N/a		Did not advance	
Jiang Fenfen	400 m T37	—N/a				1:01.88	2nd place, silver medalist(s)
Chen Zimo	400 m T38	1:02.67	4	—N/a		Did not advance	
Li Lu	400 m T47	1:01.10	5	—N/a		Did not advance	
Zhou Hongzhuan	400 m T53	—N/a				55.09	3rd place, bronze medalist(s)
Gao Fang	400 m T53	—N/a				56.53	4
Zhou Zhaoqian	400 m T54	53.73	2 Q	—N/a		54.01	3rd place, bronze medalist(s)
Tian Yajuan	400 m T54	55.72	4 Q	—N/a		55.55	7
Lan Hanyu	800 m T34	—N/a				2:11.97	5
Liu Panpan	800 m T34	—N/a				2:18.82	7
Zhou Hongzhuan	800 m T53	—N/a				1:46.83	3rd place, bronze medalist(s)
Gao Fang	800 m T53	—N/a				1:51.81	5
Zhou Zhaoqian	800 m T54	1:47.47	3 Q	—N/a		1:43.24	2nd place, silver medalist(s)
Tian Yajuan	800 m T54	1:47.48	5 Q	—N/a		1:48.49	8
He Shanshan	1500 m T11	4:44.66	1 Q	—N/a		4:32.82	2nd place, silver medalist(s)
Zhou Zhaoqian	1500 m T54	3:34.98	3 Q	—N/a		3:53.20	10
Tian Yajuan	1500 m T54	3:20.42	4 Q	—N/a		3:20.54	6
Tian Yajuan	5000 m T54	12:13.81	4 Q	—N/a		11:37.24	6
He Shanshan	Marathon T12	—N/a				DSQ	
Tian Yajuan	Marathon T54	—N/a				2:12:51	15
Zhou Zhaoqian	Marathon T54	—N/a				1:52:09	5

Mixed

Athlete	Event	Heat		Final	
Athlete	Event	Result	Rank	Result	Rank
Wang Hao; Hu Yang; Zhou Guohua; Wen Xiaoyan	4 × 100 m relay	45.09	1 Q	45.07 WR	1st place, gold medalist(s)

=== Field events ===
Men

Athlete	Event	Final	
Athlete	Event	Distance	Position
Zhao Yalong	High jump T47	1.95	6
Chen Hongjie	High jump T47	1.88	9
Di Dongdong	Long jump T11	6.85 WR	1st place, gold medalist(s)
Chen Shichang	Long jump T11	6.50	2nd place, silver medalist(s)
Ye Tao	Long jump T11	6.29	4
Yang Yifei	Long jump T36	5.64	5
Zhong Huanghao	Long jump T38	6.50	2nd place, silver medalist(s)
Zhou Peng	Long jump T38	5.77	8
Wang Hao	Long jump T47	7.32	2nd place, silver medalist(s)
Liu Li	Shot put F33	10.87	6
Cai Bingchen	Shot put F33	12.77 WR	1st place, gold medalist(s)
Lin Wenbang	Shot put F34	11.22	5
Fu Xinhan	Shot put F35	15.75	4
Wang Wei	Shot put F40	9.90	8
Huang Jun	Shot put F41	11.66	3rd place, bronze medalist(s)
Zhiwei Xia	Shot put F41	11.57	4
Sun Pengxiang	Shot put F41	10.37	7
Zhang Zhongqiang	Javelin throw F34	35.68	4
Lin Wenbang	Javelin throw F34	33.33	6
An Dongquan	Javelin throw F38	51.97	3rd place, bronze medalist(s)
Sun Pengxiang	Javelin throw F41	44.72	2nd place, silver medalist(s)

Women

Athlete	Event	Final	
Athlete	Event	Distance	Position
Zhou Guohua	Long jump T11	4.91	2nd place, silver medalist(s)
Wen Xiaoyan	Long jump T37	5.44	1st place, gold medalist(s)
Chen Zimo	Long jump T38	4.98	5
Zhao Yuping	Shot put F12	12.21	3rd place, bronze medalist(s)
Xue Enhui	Shot put F12	10.53	4
Zhang Liangmin	Shot put F12	10.51	5
Wu Qing	Shot put F33	7.98	1st place, gold medalist(s)
Zou Lijuan	Shot put F34	9.14	1st place, gold medalist(s)
Zuo Caiyun	Shot put F34	7.52	4
Wang Jun	Shot put F35	11.94	2nd place, silver medalist(s)
Li Yingli	Shot put F37	13.45	1st place, gold medalist(s)
Mi Na	Shot put F37	13.19	2nd place, silver medalist(s)
Zhang Jiamin	Shot put F46	10.66	8
Xu Mian	Shot put F57	10.89	2nd place, silver medalist(s)
Tian Yuxin	Shot put F57	10.22	5
Yao Juan	Shot put F64	12.53	1st place, gold medalist(s)
Yang Yue	Shot put F64	11.77	3rd place, bronze medalist(s)
Zhang Liangmin	Discus throw F11	39.08	1st place, gold medalist(s)
Xue Enhui	Discus throw F11	37.67	3rd place, bronze medalist(s)
Li Yingli	Discus throw F38	38.64	2nd place, silver medalist(s)
Mi Na	Discus throw F38	37.51	4
Dong Feixia	Discus throw F55	26.67	2nd place, silver medalist(s)
Xu Mian	Discus throw F57	32.81	2nd place, silver medalist(s)
Tian Yuxin	Discus throw F57	30.48	5
Yang Yue	Discus throw F64	42.39	1st place, gold medalist(s)
Yao Juan	Discus throw F64	41.98	2nd place, silver medalist(s)
Zhao Yuping	Javelin throw F13	47.06 WR	1st place, gold medalist(s)
Zou Lijuan	Javelin throw F34	22.55 WR	1st place, gold medalist(s)
Zuo Caiyun	Javelin throw F34	19.44	2nd place, silver medalist(s)
Lin Sitong	Javelin throw F56	22.35	3rd place, bronze medalist(s)

== Badminton ==
China has qualified thirteen para badminton players for the following events, through the release of BWF para-badminton Race to Paris Paralympic Ranking.

Men

Athlete	Event	Group Stage				Quarterfinal	Semifinal	Final / BM	
Athlete	Event	Opposition Score	Opposition Score	Opposition Score	Rank	Opposition Score	Opposition Score	Opposition Score	Rank
Qu Zimo	Singles WH1	Jeong (KOR); W (21–14, 21–11)	Ramli (MAS); W (21–7, 21–4)	—N/a	1 Q	Yang (CHN); W (21–9, 16–21, 21–8)	Wandschneider (GER); W (21–1, 21–10)	Choi (KOR); W (21–3, 21–7)	1st place, gold medalist(s)
Yang Tong	Singles WH1	Toupé (FRA); W (21–14, 21–12)	Wandschneider (GER); L (22–24, 21–12, 16–21)	—N/a	2 Q	Qu (CHN); L (9–21, 21–16, 8–21)	Did not advance		=5
Mai Jianpeng	Singles WH2	Yu (KOR); L (9–21, 22–24)	Hellmann (GER); W (21–19, 9–21, 21–17)	—N/a	2	Did not advance			
Yang Jianyuan	Singles SL3	Bunsun (THA); L (14–21, 9–21)	Nitesh (IND); L (5–21, 11–21)	Sarkar (IND); L (15–21, 11–21)	4	Did not advance			
Lin Naili	Singles SH6	Shephard (GBR); W (21–17, 21–14)	Noakes (FRA); L (15–21, 17–21)	Tavares (BRA); L (15–21, 15–21)	3	Did not advance			
Mai Jianpeng; Qu Zimo	Doubles WH1–2	Hellmann / Wandschneider (GER); W (21–11, 21–17)	Noorlan / Ramli (MAS); W (16–21, 6–21)	Kajiwara / Murayama (JPN); W (21–15, 21–15)	1 Q	—N/a	Kajiwara / Murayama (JPN); W (21–15, 21–14)	Yu / Jeong (KOR); W (21–10, 21–12)	1st place, gold medalist(s)

Women

Athlete	Event	Group Stage				Quarterfinal	Semifinal	Final / BM	
Athlete	Event	Opposition Score	Opposition Score	Opposition Score	Rank	Opposition Score	Opposition Score	Opposition Score	Rank
Yin Menglu	Singles WH1	Satomi (JPN); W (12–21, 21–18, 21–15)	Mathez (SUI); W (21–9, 21–13)	Gorodetzky (ISR); W (21–8, 21–5)	1 Q	—N/a	Satomi (JPN); L (17–21, 20–22)	To (BEL); W (21–9, 21–9)	3rd place, bronze medalist(s)
Liu Yutong	Singles WH2	Yamazaki (JPN); W (21–5, 21–3)	Seçkin (TUR); W (21–5, 21–8)	—N/a	1 Q	—N/a	Yamazaki (JPN); W (21–6, 21–9)	Li (CHN); W (21–15, 21–13)	1st place, gold medalist(s)
Li Hongyan	Singles WH2	Jáuregui (PER); W (21–10, 17–21, 21–15)	Yang (TPE); W (21–4, 21–2)	Renggli (SUI); W (21–17, 21–13)	1 Q	—N/a	Renggli (SUI); W (21–17, 21–12)	Liu (CHN); L (15–21, 13–21)	2nd place, silver medalist(s)
Xiao Zuxian	Singles SL3	Henpraiwan (THA); W (21–7, 21–12)	Ito (JPN); W (21–5, 21–4)	Yildiz (TUR); W (21–9, 21–10)	1 Q	—N/a	Bolaji (NGR); W (21–16, 21–17)	Syakuroh (INA); W (21–14, 22–20)	1st place, gold medalist(s)
Cheng Hefang	Singles SL4	Sadiyah (INA); W (21–12, 21–15)	Noël (FRA); W (21–12, 21–11)	—N/a	1 Q	Fujino (JPN); W (21–9, 21–13)	Sagøy (NOR); W (21–14, 21–9)	Oktila (INA); W (21–14, 21–18)	1st place, gold medalist(s)
Yang Qiuxia	Singles SU5	Lefort (FRA); W (9–21, 21–4, 21–12)	Ramadass (IND); W (21–15, 21–7)	—N/a	1 Q	—N/a	Rosengren (DEN); W (21–14, 21–14)	Murugesan (IND); W (21–17, 21–10)	1st place, gold medalist(s)
Li Fengmei	Singles SH6	Saeyang (THA); W (21–5, 21–5)	Marlina (INA); W (21–10, 21–16)	Póveda (PER); W (21–17, 21–6)	1 Q	—N/a	Marlina (INA); W (21–8, 21–4)	Lin (CHN); W (21–14, 21–17)	1st place, gold medalist(s)
Lin Shuangbao	Singles SH6	Cai (TPE); W (21–7, 21–6)	Simon (USA); W (21–9, 21–12)	Sivan (IND); W (22–20, 21–18)	1 Q	—N/a	Sivan (IND); W (21–13, 21–19)	Li (CHN); L (14–21, 17–21)	2nd place, silver medalist(s)
Liu Yutong; Yin Menglu	Doubles WH1–2	Satomi / Yamazaki (JPN); W (21–14, 21–14)	Kwon / Jung (KOR); W (21–11, 21–8)	—N/a	1 Q	—N/a	Mathez / Renggli (SUI); W (21–6, 21–15)	Satomi / Yamazaki (JPN); W (21–17, 21–19)	1st place, gold medalist(s)

Mixed

Athlete	Event	Group Stage				Semifinal	Final / BM	
Athlete	Event	Opposition Score	Opposition Score	Opposition Score	Rank	Opposition Score	Opposition Score	Rank
Yang Jianyuan; Yang Qiuxia	Doubles SL3–SU5	Teamarrom / Saensupa (THA); L (11–21, 15–21)	Ito / Imai (JPN); W (21–19, 21–15)	Sadiyah / Setiawan (INA); L (21–23, 16–21)	3	Did not advance		
Lin Naili; Li Fengmei	Doubles SH6	Subhan / Marlina (INA); L (21–19, 12–21, 15–21)	Shephard / Choong (GBR); W (21–11, 21–7)	—N/a	2 Q	Subhan / Marlina (INA); W (17–21, 21–16, 21–19)	Krajewski / Simon (USA); W (21–14, 21–12)	1st place, gold medalist(s)

== Blind football ==
The Chinese men's blind football team qualified for the Paralympic Games after winning the 2022 Asia/Oceania Championships held in Kochi.

Summary

Team	Event	Group Stage				Semifinals	Final / BM	
Team	Event	Opposition Score	Opposition Score	Opposition Score	Rank	Opposition Score	Opposition Score	Rank
China men's	Men's tournament	France; L 0–1	Turkey; W 2–0	Brazil; D 0–0	3	—N/a	Morocco; W 1–0	5

Team roster

Coach: Wang Guishun

The following is the China squad in the football 5-a-side tournament of the 2024 Summer Paralympics.

No.	Pos.	Player	Class	Date of birth (age)
1	GK	Wu Limin	Sighted	6 February 1990 (aged 34)
2	FW	Tang Zhihua	B1	13 April 1993 (aged 31)
3	DF	Liu Meng	B1	30 June 1995 (aged 29)
6	FW	Zhang Jiabin	B1	9 May 1994 (aged 30)
7	MF	Yu Yutan	B1	31 December 1988 (aged 35)
8	DF	Li Haifu	B1	19 December 1998 (aged 25)
9	FW	Xu Guansheng	B1	3 June 1996 (aged 28)
10	FW	Zhong Liang	B1	5 May 2001 (aged 23)
11	FW	Zhu Ruiming	B1	3 April 2000 (aged 24)
12	GK	Xu Huachu	Sighted	3 May 1991 (aged 33)

Group stage

Pos	Team	Pld	W	D	L	GF	GA	GD	Pts	Qualification
1	Brazil	3	2	1	0	6	0	+6	7	Semi-finals
2	France (H)	3	2	0	1	3	3	0	6	Semi-finals
3	China	3	1	1	1	2	1	+1	4	Fifth place match
4	Turkey	3	0	0	3	0	7	−7	0	Seventh place match

Source: Paris 2024
(H) Hosts
1 September 2024
20:30

France	1–0	China
Youmé 19'	Report

Eiffel Tower Stadium, Paris
Attendance: 9,160
Referee: Germinal Dante Lubrano (Argentina)

2 September 2024
18:30

Turkey	0–2	China
	Report	Zhu 20'; Tang 24'

Eiffel Tower Stadium, Paris
Attendance: 8,814
Referee: Rodolphe-Marc-Pierrick Bonnin (France)

3 September 2024
18:30

China	0–0	Brazil
	Report

Eiffel Tower Stadium, Paris
Attendance: 10,580
Referee: Germinal Dante Lubrano (Argentina)

Fifth place match

5 September 2024
13:00

China	1–0	Morocco
Liu 9'	Report

Eiffel Tower Stadium, Paris
Attendance: 8,979
Referee: Rodolphe-Marc-Pierrick Bonnin (France)

== Boccia ==
China confirmed a full-squad of BC1/BC2 and BC4 event, by virtue of their result as the highest rank nation's in the BC4 pairs event, at the 2023 Asia Regional Championship in Hong Kong; and by winning the gold medal in the mixed team event for BC1/BC2, at the 2024 Paralympic Qualification Tournament in Coimbra, Portugal.

Athlete	Event	Pool matches				Play Off Matches	Quarterfinals	Semifinals	Final / BM	
Athlete	Event	Opposition Score	Opposition Score	Opposition Score	Rank	Opposition Score	Opposition Score	Opposition Score	Opposition Score	Rank
Lan Zhijian	Men's individual BC2	Sugimura (JPN); L 0–5	Herlangga (INA); L 1–9	Lee (MAS); L 1–3	4	Did not advance				
Yan Zhiqiang	Men's individual BC2	Yudha (INA); L 2–5	Hirose (JPN); W 17–0	Allard (CAN); W 9–0	2 Q	Sugimura (JPN); L 2–5	Did not advance			
Zheng Yuansen	Men's individual BC4	Uchida (JPN); W 10–1	Leung (HKG); W 3–2	Costa (BRA); W 7–0	1 Q	—N/a	Kolinko (UKR); L 2–3	Did not advance		
Zhang Qi	Women's individual BC1	Basic (CRO); W 7–0	Aounallah (TUN); W 19–0	—N/a	1 Q	—N/a	DeSilva-Andrade (BER); L 2–4	Did not advance		
Lin Ximei	Women's individual BC4	Cheung (HKG); L 2–6	Phonsila (THA); W 6–2	Vozarova (SVK); W 14–0	2 Q	—N/a	Oliveira (POR); W 5–2	Chica (COL); W 4–3	Cheung (HKG); W 5–1	1st place, gold medalist(s)
Zheng Yuansen; Lin Ximei	Mixed pairs BC4	Canada (CAN); L 5–8	Croatia (CRO); W 7–0	—N/a	2 Q	—N/a	Colombia (COL); L 3–7	Did not advance		
Lan Zhijian; Yan Zhiqiang; Zhang Qi	Mixed team BC1/BC2	Great Britain (GBR); W 13–1	Portugal (POR); W 8–3	—N/a	1 Q	—N/a	France (FRA); W 7–4	South Korea (KOR); W 7–3	Indonesia (INA); W 7–6	1st place, gold medalist(s)

== Cycling ==
=== Track ===
Men

Athlete	Event	Qualification		Final	
Athlete	Event	Time	Rank	Opposition Time	Rank
Li Zhangyu	Time trial C1–3	1:03.777	1 Q	1:03.480	1st place, gold medalist(s)
Li Zhangyu	Pursuit C1	3:31.338 WR	1 QG	Liang (CHN); 2:15.018	1st place, gold medalist(s)
Liang Weicong	Time trial C1–3	1:04.400	3 Q	1:04.103	2nd place, silver medalist(s)
Liang Weicong	Pursuit C1	3:42.468	2 QG	Li (CHN); OVL	2nd place, silver medalist(s)

Women

Athlete	Event	Qualification		Final	
Athlete	Event	Time	Rank	Opposition Time	Rank
Qian Wangwei	Time trial C1–3	37.621	2 Q	37.616	2nd place, silver medalist(s)
Qian Wangwei	Pursuit C1–3	4:17.814	9	Did not advance	
Wang Xiaomei	Time trial C1–3	39.029	5 Q	39.058	5
Wang Xiaomei	Pursuit C1–3	3:44.660	1 QG	Schrager (GBR); 3:41.692 WR	1st place, gold medalist(s)
Li Xiaohui	Time trial C4–5	37.006	5 Q	37.187	4
Li Xiaohui	Pursuit C4	3:57.899	8	Did not advance	

Qualification Legend: QB=Final Bronze medal; QG=Final Gold medal; QF=Final

=== Road ===
Men

Athlete	Event	Result	Rank
Liang Weicong	Road race C1-3	2:08:46	27
Liang Weicong	Time trial C1	23:01.23	6
Li Zhangyu	Time trial C1	24:50.93	9
Liu Qiangli	Road race H5	DNF	
Liu Qiangli	Time trial H5	44:40.85	4
Chen Jianxin	Road race T1–2	1:15:08	1st place, gold medalist(s)
Chen Jianxin	Time trial T1–2	21:35.78	1st place, gold medalist(s)

Women

Athlete	Event	Result	Rank
Wang Xiaomei	Road race C1-3	1:44:38	8
Wang Xiaomei	Time trial C1–3	22:44.59	7
Qian Wangwei	Road race C1–3	1:56:28	12
Qian Wangwei	Time trial C1–3	23:14.63	9
Li Xiaohui	Road race C4–5	2:01:21	9
Li Xiaohui	Time trial C4	24:03.84	8
Sun Bianbian	Road race H5	1:52:25	2nd place, silver medalist(s)
Sun Bianbian	Time trial H4–5	25:13.07	3rd place, bronze medalist(s)

== Goalball ==
The Chinese men's and women's goalball teams qualified for the paralympic games.

Summary

Team	Event	Group Stage				Quarterfinal	Semifinal	Final / BM	
Team	Event	Opposition Score	Opposition Score	Opposition Score	Rank	Opposition Score	Opposition Score	Opposition Score	Rank
China men's	Men's tournament	Japan; W 7–6	Egypt; W 7–4	Ukraine; W 6–1	1 Q	France; W 12–2	Japan; L 5–13	Brazil; L 3–5	4
China women's	Women's tournament	Turkey; W 7–5	Brazil; W 3–1	Israel; W 6–1	1 Q	France; W 12–2	Israel; L 1–2	Brazil; W 6–0	3rd place, bronze medalist(s)

=== Men's tournament ===
The Chinese men's team qualified by virtue of the runner-up at the 2022 IBSA Goalball World Championships in Matosinhos, Portugal.

Team roster

Coach: Yin Shiqiang

The following is the China squad in the goalball tournament of the 2024 Summer Paralympics.

No.	Player	Class	Date of birth (age)
3	Yang Mingyuan	B2	13 January 1998 (aged 26)
4	Chen Liang Liang	B1	28 September 1984 (aged 39)
5	Hu Ming Yao	B2	14 January 1995 (aged 29)
6	Yu Qinquan	B1	19 April 1996 (aged 28)
7	Yu Deyi	B2	16 November 1997 (aged 26)
9	Wang Jinhao	B2	24 February 2001 (aged 23)

Group stage

Pos	Team	Pld	W	D	L	GF	GA	GD	Pts	Qualification
1	China	3	3	0	0	20	11	+9	9	Quarter-finals
2	Ukraine	3	2	0	1	16	17	−1	6	Quarter-finals
3	Japan	3	1	0	2	25	17	+8	3	Quarter-finals
4	Egypt	3	0	0	3	8	24	−16	0	Quarter-finals

Source: Paris 2024
29 August 2024
09:00

China	7–6	Japan
Yang 2', 5', 5', 8', 11', 22'; Hu 14'	Report	Kaneko 2', 14', 16'; Miyajiki 3', 6'; Sano 12'

South Paris Arena, Paris
Referee:
Claude Dagenais (Canada)
Raquel Aguado (Spain)

31 August 2024
09:00

Egypt	4–7	China
Awwad 5'; Elsayed 12'; Mohamed 18'; Yousef 22'	Report	Yu Deyi 1', 6', 10'; Yang 5', 8', 15', 16'

South Paris Arena, Paris
Referee:
Linda Welborn (United States)
Romualdas Vaitieku (Lithuania)

1 September 2024
17:30

China	6–1	Ukraine
Yu Deyi 2', 7'; Yang 13', 17'; Hu 17'; Yu Qinquan 18'	Report	Tsyhanenko 19'

South Paris Arena, Paris
Referee:
Azhi Mahmood (Iraq)
Patrik Larsson (Sweden)

Quarter-finals

2 September 2024
17:45

China	12–2	France
Yang 1', 2', 6', 7', 9', 10', 13', 14', 14', 15'; Yu Deyi 1'	Report	Baich 9', 12'

South Paris Arena, Paris
Referee:
Patrik Larsson (Sweden)
Claude Dagenais (Canada)

Semi-finals

4 September 2024
18:00

China	5–13	Japan
Yang 1', 8', 17'; Yu Deyi 21', 23'	Report	Miyajiki 0', 1', 1', 6', 8'; Kaneko 7', 7' (pen.), 7', 13', 16', 16' (pen.), 20' (pen.), 22' (pen.)

South Paris Arena, Paris
Referee:
Antonios Christodoulos (Greece)
Raquel Aguado (Spain)

Bronze medal match

5 September 2024; 13:15	Brazil	5–3	China	South Paris Arena, Paris; Referees: Manar Obeidat (Jordan); Juha Vuokila (Finland)
5 September 2024; 13:15	Moreno 6', 13', 15'; Sousa 13', 15'	Report	Yang 15'; Yu Deyi 17', 22'	South Paris Arena, Paris; Referees: Manar Obeidat (Jordan); Juha Vuokila (Finland)

=== Women's tournament ===
The Chinese women's team qualified through the 2023 IBSA World Games in Birmingham, Great Britain.

Team roster

Coach: Zhang Xiaopeng

The following is the China squad in the goalball tournament of the 2024 Summer Paralympics.

No.	Player	Class	Date of birth (age)
1	Zhang Xiling	B3	17 June 1998 (aged 26)
2	Cao Zhenhua	B1	23 August 1997 (aged 27)
5	Xu Miao	B3	12 October 2001 (aged 22)
6	Wang Chunyan	B2	7 December 2001 (aged 22)
7	Ke Peiying	B2	27 January 2001 (aged 23)
9	Wang Chunhua	B2	20 June 1995 (aged 29)

Group stage

Pos	Team	Pld	W	D	L	GF	GA	GD	Pts	Qualification
1	China	3	3	0	0	16	7	+9	9	Quarter-finals
2	Turkey	3	1	1	1	13	14	−1	4	Quarter-finals
3	Israel	3	1	0	2	13	15	−2	3	Quarter-finals
4	Brazil	3	0	1	2	8	14	−6	1	Quarter-finals

Source: Paris 2024
Rules for classification: 1) points; 2) goal difference; 3) number of wins; 4) goals against; 5) head-to-head goal difference.
30 August 2024
19:00

China	7–5	Turkey
Wang Chunyan 1', 6', 6', 12', 13', 13', 16'	Report	Sevt. Altunoluk 0', 1', 3', 5'; Güler 5'

South Paris Arena, Paris
Referee:
Janice Dawson (Canada)
Sarah Kuper (Germany)

31 August 2024
14:45

China	3–1	Brazil
Wang Chunyan 11', 19'; Cao 14'	Report	Lima 14'

South Paris Arena, Paris
Referee:
Raquel Aguado (Spain)
Manar Obeidat (Jordan)

1 September 2024
14:45

Israel	1–6	China
Mizrahi 18'	Report	Wang Chenyang 3', 13', 20'; Cao 5', 13', 14'

South Paris Arena, Paris
Referee:
Antonios Christodoulos (Greece)
Raquel Aguado (Spain)

Quarter-finals

3 September 2024
13:30

China	12–2	France
Cao 1', 3', 7', 18', 19', 21', 22'; Zhang 15', 17', 17'; Wang Chunyan 20'; Wang Chunhua 22'	Report	Rondpierre 13'; Ajami 17' (pen.)

South Paris Arena, Paris
Referee:
Manar Obeidat (Jordan)
Patrik Larsson (Sweden)

Semi-finals

4 September 2024
15:15

China	1–2	Israel
Wang Chunyan 8'	Report	Ben-David 3'; Mahamid 14'

South Paris Arena, Paris
Referee:
Romualdas Vaitiekus (Lithuania)
Janice Dawson (Canada)

Bronze medal match

5 September 2024
15:00

China	6–0	Brazil
Cao 2', 12'; Wang Chunyan 3', 12', 13', 19'	Report

South Paris Arena, Paris
Referee:
Azhi Mahmood (Iraq)
Sarah Kuper (Germany)

== Judo ==
Athlete	Event	Round of 16	Quarterfinals	Semifinals	Repechage	Final / BM	
Athlete	Event	Opposition Result	Opposition Result	Opposition Result	Opposition Result	Opposition Result	Rank
Zhu Shiwen	Men's 60 kg J1	Borges (URU); W 1–0	Banitaba (IRI); L 0–10	—N/a	Blanco (VEN); L 1–10	Did not advance	
Li Liqing	Women's 48 kg J2	—N/a	Brussig (SUI); W 10–0	Martinet (FRA); L 0–10	—N/a	Ivanytska (UKR); W 10–0	3rd place, bronze medalist(s)
Shi Yijie	Women's 57 kg J1	—N/a	Amrieva (UZB); W 10–0	Gagne (CAN); W 10–0	—N/a	Mutia (USA); W 11–0	1st place, gold medalist(s)
Wang Jianan	Women's 57 kg J2	—N/a	Khodjaeva (UZB); L 0–10	—N/a	Yeşilyurt (TUR); L 1–10	Did not advance	
Liu Li	Women's 70 kg J1	—N/a	Boggiano (ARG); W 10–0	Pernheim (SWE); W 10–0	—N/a	Freitas (BRA); W 1–0	1st place, gold medalist(s)
Wang Yue	Women's 70 kg J2	—N/a	Bye	Kaldani (GEO); W 10–0	—N/a	Maldonado (BRA); L 0–10	2nd place, silver medalist(s)
Wang Hongyu	Women's +70 kg J2	—N/a	Raifova (KAZ); W 10–0	Hernández (CUB); L 0–11	—N/a	Karimova (AZE); W 10–0	3rd place, bronze medalist(s)

== Paracanoeing ==
China earned quota places for the following events through the 2023 ICF Canoe Sprint World Championships in Duisburg, Germany; and 2024 ICF Canoe Sprint World Championships in Szeged, Hungary.

Athlete	Event	Heats		Semifinal		Final	
Athlete	Event	Time	Rank	Time	Rank	Time	Rank
Yu Xiaowei	Men's KL1	53.20	4 SF	52.54	2 FA	50.50	6
Pu Yi	Men's VL3	50.05	2 SF	49.99	1 FA	48.46	5
Xie Maosan	Women's KL1	57.85	2 SF	57.26	2 FA	54.91	5
Wang Danqin	Women's KL2	1:00.95	2 SF	58.08	2 FA	58.98	7
Zhong Yongyuan	Women's VL3	58.67	2 SF	59.00	1 FA	57.43	3rd place, bronze medalist(s)

Qualification Legend: FA - Qualify to medal final; FB - Qualify to non-medal final; SF - Qualify to semifinal

== Powerlifting ==
China secured sixteen quotas by virtue of the rankings when the qualifying period ended on 26 June 2024. The lifters achieved qualification at sixteen weights and will have to decide which of these they will compete in at the Games.

=== Men ===
Athlete	Event	Total lifted	Rank
Zheng Yu	−49 kg	161	5
Yang Jinglang	−54 kg	179	3rd place, bronze medalist(s)
Qi Yongkai	−59 kg	200	2nd place, silver medalist(s)
Zou Yi	−65 kg	215	1st place, gold medalist(s)
Hu Peng	−72 kg	214	2nd place, silver medalist(s)
Gu Xiaofei	−80 kg	225	2nd place, silver medalist(s)
Yan Panpan	−88 kg	242 PR	1st place, gold medalist(s)
Ye Jixiong	−97 kg	229	2nd place, silver medalist(s)

=== Women ===
Athlete	Event	Total lifted	Rank
Cui Zhe	−41 kg	119 PR	1st place, gold medalist(s)
Guo Lingling	−45 kg	123 WR PR	1st place, gold medalist(s)
Xiao Jinping	−50 kg	119	2nd place, silver medalist(s)
Cui Jianjin	−61 kg	140	2nd place, silver medalist(s)
Tan Yujiao	−67 kg	142 WR PR	1st place, gold medalist(s)
Han Miaoyu	−79 kg	154 WR PR	1st place, gold medalist(s)
Zheng Feifei	−86 kg	155	2nd place, silver medalist(s)
Deng Xuemei	+86 kg	155	2nd place, silver medalist(s)

== Rowing ==
Chinese rowers qualified boats in each of the following classes at the 2023 World Rowing Championships in Belgrade, Serbia.

Athlete	Event	Heats		Repechage		Final	
Athlete	Event	Time	Rank	Time	Rank	Time	Rank
Wang Lili	PR1 women's single sculls	11:09.66	4 R	11:23.83	3 FB	11:21.85	7
Liu Shuang; Jiang Jijian	PR2 mixed double sculls	8:03.70	1 FA	Bye		8:23.45	2nd place, silver medalist(s)
Wang Xixi; Zeng Wanbin; Wu Junlong; Jiang Lingtao coxswain: Yu Li	PR3 mixed coxed four	7:14.13	4 R	7:02.50	3 FB	7:25.01	7

Qualification Legend: FA=Final A (medal); FB=Final B (non-medal); R=Repechage

== Shooting ==
China entered nine para-shooter's after achieved quota places for the following events by virtue of their best finishes at the 2022, 2023 and 2024 world cup, 2022 World Championships, 2023 World Championships and 2022 Asian Para Games as long as they obtained a minimum qualifying score (MQS) by July 15, 2024.

Men

Athlete	Event	Qualification		Final	
Athlete	Event	Points	Rank	Points	Rank
Lou Xiaolong	P1 – 10 m air pistol SH1	575	2 Q	153.7	6
Yang Chao	P1 – 10 m air pistol SH1	568	3 Q	214.3	3rd place, bronze medalist(s)
Dong Chao	R1 – 10 m air rifle standing SH1	621.6	3 Q	184.6	5
Ren Bo	R1 – 10 m air rifle standing SH1	618.3	10	Did not advance	
Dong Chao	R7 – 50 m rifle three positions SH1	1178	2 Q	451.8	2nd place, silver medalist(s)
Xu Jianjie	R7 – 50 m rifle three positions SH1	1146	13	Did not advance	

Women

Athlete	Event	Qualification		Final	
Athlete	Event	Points	Rank	Points	Rank
Zhong Yixin	R2 – 10 m air rifle standing SH1	617.6	7 Q	143.2	7
Zhang Cuiping	R2 – 10 m air rifle standing SH1	617.6	8 Q	120.2	8
Zhang Cuiping	R8 – 50 m rifle three positions SH1	1167	3 Q	446	3rd place, bronze medalist(s)
Xie Huanyu	R8 – 50 m rifle three positions SH1	1155	9	Did not advance	

Mixed

Athlete	Event	Qualification		Final	
Athlete	Event	Points	Rank	Points	Rank
Huang Xing	P3 – 25 m pistol SH1	576	3 Q	30	1st place, gold medalist(s)
Yang Chao	P3 – 25 m pistol SH1	569	8 Q	21	4
Huang Xing	P4 – 50 m pistol SH1	529	15	Did not advance	
Yang Chao	P4 – 50 m pistol SH1	549	2 Q	220.1	1st place, gold medalist(s)
Dong Chao	R6 – 50 m rifle prone SH1	623.9	9	Did not advance	
Zhang Cuiping	R6 – 50 m rifle prone SH1	616.2	20	Did not advance	

== Sitting volleyball ==
Summary

Team	Event	Group Stage				Semifinal	Final / BM	
Team	Event	Opposition Score	Opposition Score	Opposition Score	Rank	Opposition Score	Opposition Score	Rank
China women's	Women's tournament	United States; W 3–1	Italy; W 3–0	France; W 3–0	1 Q	Canada; W 3–0	United States; L 1–3	2nd place, silver medalist(s)

=== Women's tournament ===
China women's national team entered the paralympic games by virtue of their gold medal results, at the 2023 Asia and Oceania Sitting Volleyball Championships held in Astana, Kazakhstan.

Team roster

- Lyu Hongqin
- Zhao Meiling
- Qiu Junfei
- Zhang Xufei
- Li Ting
- Huang Lu
- Wang Yanan
- Zhang Lijun
- Su Limei
- Tang Xuemei
- Xu Yixiao
- Hu Huizi

Group play

Pos	Team	Pld	W	L	Pts	SW	SL	SR	SPW	SPL	SPR	Qualification
1	China	3	3	0	3	9	1	9.000	247	147	1.680	Semifinals
2	United States	3	2	1	2	7	3	2.333	237	167	1.419	Semifinals
3	Italy	3	1	2	1	3	6	0.500	177	171	1.035	Fifth place match
4	France (H)	3	0	3	0	0	9	0.000	49	225	0.218	Seventh place match

Source: Paris 2024
(H) Host

30 August 2024; 12:00	United States	1–3	China	North Paris Arena, Paris; Attendance: 2,833; Referees: Slavisa Kuzmanovic (BIH), Ayan Rakhmetov (KAZ)
30 August 2024; 12:00	(25–21, 20–25, 18–25, 24–26); P2 Report			North Paris Arena, Paris; Attendance: 2,833; Referees: Slavisa Kuzmanovic (BIH), Ayan Rakhmetov (KAZ)

1 September 2024; 14:00	Italy	0–3	China	North Paris Arena, Paris; Attendance: 3,860; Referees: Andre Calado Ferreira (BRA), Spela Plesnik (SLO)
1 September 2024; 14:00	(15–25, 16–25, 12–25); P2 Report			North Paris Arena, Paris; Attendance: 3,860; Referees: Andre Calado Ferreira (BRA), Spela Plesnik (SLO)

3 September 2024; 20:20	China	3–0	France	North Paris Arena, Paris; Attendance: 2,377; Referees: Mahdi Navidino (IRN), Krisztina Arpas (HUN)
3 September 2024; 20:20	(25–7, 25–5, 25–5); P2 Report			North Paris Arena, Paris; Attendance: 2,377; Referees: Mahdi Navidino (IRN), Krisztina Arpas (HUN)

Semifinals

5 September 2024; 20:30	China	3–0	Canada	North Paris Arena, Paris; Attendance: 2,575; Referees: Krisztina Arpas (HUN), Spela Plesnik (SLO)
5 September 2024; 20:30	(25–16, 25–22, 25–18); P2 Report			North Paris Arena, Paris; Attendance: 2,575; Referees: Krisztina Arpas (HUN), Spela Plesnik (SLO)

Gold medal match

7 September 2024; 19:30	China	1–3	United States	North Paris Arena, Paris; Attendance: 4,089; Referees: Marie-Claude Richer (CAN), Krisztina Arpas (HUN)
7 September 2024; 19:30	(21–25, 25–23, 20–25, 22–25); P2 Report			North Paris Arena, Paris; Attendance: 4,089; Referees: Marie-Claude Richer (CAN), Krisztina Arpas (HUN)

== Swimming ==
China secured eighteen quotas at the 2023 World Para Swimming Championships after finishing in the top two places in Paralympic class disciplines.

Men

Athlete	Event	Heats		Final	
Athlete	Event	Result	Rank	Result	Rank
Guo Jincheng	50 m freestyle S5	29.97	1 Q	29.33 WR; PR	1st place, gold medalist(s)
Wang Lichao	50 m freestyle S5	32.78	3 Q	31.23	3rd place, bronze medalist(s)
Yuan Weiyi	50 m freestyle S5	32.69	2 Q	30.80	2nd place, silver medalist(s)
Jia Hongguang	50 m freestyle S7	30.10	11	Did not advance	
Xie Zhili	50 m freestyle S9	25.48 AR	5 Q	25.56	4
Hua Dongdong	50 m freestyle S11	26.43	2 Q	26.11	2nd place, silver medalist(s)
Yang Bozun	50 m freestyle S11	26.64	3 Q	26.68	6
Guo Jincheng	100 m freestyle S5	1:14.56	3 Q	1:08.22 AR	2nd place, silver medalist(s)
Wang Lichao	100 m freestyle S5	1:15.39	4 Q	1:11.94	5
Yuan Weiyi	100 m freestyle S5	DSQ			
Jia Hongguang	100 m freestyle S6	1:08.10	6 Q	1:09.60	8
Luo Jinbiao	100 m freestyle S6	1:10.14	9 R	Did not advance	
Liu Fengqi	100 m freestyle S8	1:00.07	7 Q	1:00.38	7
Wu Hongliang	100 m freestyle S8	1:00.29	8 Q	1:12.04	8
Xu Haijiao	100 m freestyle S8	59.50	5 Q	59.67	5
Guo Jincheng	200 m freestyle S5	2:44.72	5 Q	2:40.74 AR	5
Wang Lichao	200 m freestyle S5	2:46.20	6 Q	2:45.66	7
Luo Jinbiao	400 m freestyle S6	5:20.90	5 Q	5:14.64	5
Tang Qian	400 m freestyle S6	5:23.35	7 Q	5:11.85	4
Huang Xianquan	400 m freestyle S7	5:10.55	5 Q	5:09.53	7
Li Ting	400 m freestyle S8	4:37.11	9 R	Did not advance	
Wu Hongliang	400 m freestyle S8	4:45.07	13	Did not advance	
Xu Haijiao	400 m freestyle S8	4:36.82	7 Q	4:36.34	7
Xie Zhili	400 m freestyle S9	4:28.52	9 R	Did not advance	
Hua Dongdong	400 m freestyle S11	—N/a		4:36.13	4
Zhang Bowen	400 m freestyle S11	—N/a		5:22.77	8
Zou Liankang	50 m backstroke S4	45.20	5 Q	45.44	5
Guo Jincheng	50 m backstroke S5	34.33	2 Q	33.02	2nd place, silver medalist(s)
Yuan Weiyi	50 m backstroke S5	32.61	1 Q	32.47	1st place, gold medalist(s)
Wang Lichao	50 m backstroke S5	34.80	3 Q	33.06	3rd place, bronze medalist(s)
Jia Hongguang	100 m backstroke S6	1:17.35	3 Q	1:17.86	6
Yang Hong	100 m backstroke S6	1:18.13	4 Q	1:14.31	1st place, gold medalist(s)
Wang Jingang	100 m backstroke S6	1:18.47	5 Q	1:15.16	2nd place, silver medalist(s)
Huang Xianquan	100 m backstroke S7	1:19.23	10 R	Did not advance	
Liu Fengqi	100 m backstroke S8	1:08.55	4 Q	1:08.60	7
Yang Bozun	100 m backstroke S11	1:11.40	7 Q	1:09.73	6
Zhang Bowen	100 m backstroke S11	1:11.80	8 Q	1:12.34	8
Hua Dongdong	100 m backstroke S11	1:12.99	9 R	Did not advance	
Deng Jieqiu	100 m backstroke S12	1:13.19	14	Did not advance	
Yang Hong	100 m breaststroke SB6	1:20.44	1 Q	1:18.34 PR	1st place, gold medalist(s)
Guo Jincheng	100 m breaststroke SB6	1:25.71	7 Q	1:25.62	7
Jia Hongguang	100 m breaststroke SB6	1:26.63	9 R	Did not advance	
Yang Guanglong	100 m breaststroke SB8	1:11.13	2 Q	1:09.83	2nd place, silver medalist(s)
Xu Haijiao	100 m breaststroke SB8	1:12.66	4 Q	DSQ	
Li Ting	100 m breaststroke SB8	DSQ			
Tang Shuyuan	100 m breaststroke SB9	1:09.55	5 Q	1:09.55	5
Yang Bozun	100 m breaststroke SB11	1:14.99	2 Q	1:12.26	2nd place, silver medalist(s)
Guo Jincheng	50 m butterfly S5	31.33	1 Q	30.28 WR; PR	1st place, gold medalist(s)
Wang Lichao	50 m butterfly S5	33.01	3 Q	30.89	3rd place, bronze medalist(s)
Yuan Weiyi	50 m butterfly S5	32.59	2 Q	30.71	2nd place, silver medalist(s)
Jia Hongguang	50 m butterfly S6	DSQ			
Wang Jingang	50 m butterfly S6	32.02	2 Q	31.24	1st place, gold medalist(s)
Yang Hong	50 m butterfly S6	32.48	4 Q	32.67	4
Huang Xianquan	50 m butterfly S7	32.49	9 R	Did not advance	
Wu Hongliang	100 m butterfly S8	1:04.59	3 Q	1:02.61	2nd place, silver medalist(s)
Li Ting	100 m butterfly S8	1:04.50	2 Q	1:03.38	4
Yang Guanglong	100 m butterfly S8	1:05.41	6 Q	1:02.73	3rd place, bronze medalist(s)
Xie Zhili	100 m butterfly S9	1:01.96	7 Q	1:02.27	7
Yang Bozun	100 m butterfly S11	1:16.75	10 R	Did not advance	
Hua Dongdong	100 m butterfly S11	1:09.26	7 Q	1:09.15	7
Deng Jieqiu	100 m butterfly S12	1:00.97	9 R	Did not advance	
Guo Jincheng	200 m individual medley SM6	2:48.56	7 Q	2:49.42	7
Wang Jingang	200 m individual medley SM6	2:48.21	6 Q	2:45.21	5
Yang Hong	200 m individual medley SM6	2:40.91	1 Q	2:37.31 WR; PR	1st place, gold medalist(s)
Huang Xianquan	200 m individual medley SM7	2:43.67	6 Q	2:43.69	7
Liu Fengqi	200 m individual medley SM8	2:30.92	7 Q	2:30.39	8
Xu Haijiao	200 m individual medley SM8	2:28.74	2 Q	2:22.54	1st place, gold medalist(s)
Yang Guanglong	200 m individual medley SM8	2:29.38	3 Q	2:23.50	2nd place, silver medalist(s)
Xie Zhili	200 m individual medley SM9	2:22.60	7 Q	2:21.09	7
Yang Bozun	200 m individual medley SM11	—N/a		2:33.47	5

Women

Athlete	Event	Heats		Final	
Athlete	Event	Result	Rank	Result	Rank
Peng Qiuping	50 m freestyle S4	42.63	6 Q	43.34	6
Jiang Yuyan	50 m freestyle S6	32.70	1 Q	32.59 PR	1st place, gold medalist(s)
Zhang Li	50 m freestyle S6	36.67	11	Did not advance	
Zhu Ji	50 m freestyle S6	35.95	8 Q	36.43	8
Jiang Shengnan	50 m freestyle S8	31.52	5 Q	30.97	4
Jin Xiaoqin	50 m freestyle S8	31.17	4 Q	31.91	7
Zhu Hui	50 m freestyle S8	31.66	6 Q	31.33	5
Chen Yi	50 m freestyle S10	27.73	4 Q	27.10 WR; PR	1st place, gold medalist(s)
Li Guizhi	50 m freestyle S11	30.68	5 Q	30.45	5
Ma Jia	50 m freestyle S11	30.24	2 Q	28.96 WR; PR	1st place, gold medalist(s)
Zhang Xiaotong	50 m freestyle S11	30.74	6 Q	30.40	4
Liu Yu	100 m freestyle S5	1:25.16	4 Q	1:23.17	4
Lu Dong	100 m freestyle S5	1:27.34	7 Q	1:24.12	5
Yao Cuan	100 m freestyle S5	1:26.58	6 Q	DSQ	
Jiang Yuyan	100 m freestyle S7	1:13.18	5 Q	1:09.68 WR; PR	1st place, gold medalist(s)
Xu Jialing	100 m freestyle S9	1:05.44	8 Q	1:05.31	7
Chen Yi	100 m freestyle S10	1:02.77	10 R	Did not advance	
Zhang Meng	100 m freestyle S10	1:01.89	7 Q	1:01.47	7
Cai Liwen	100 m freestyle S11	1:10.03	7 Q	1:07.70	4
Li Guizhi	100 m freestyle S11	1:09.54	5 Q	1:08.71	6
Zhang Xiaotong	100 m freestyle S11	1:06.95	2 Q	1:06.84	3rd place, bronze medalist(s)
Liu Yu	200 m freestyle S5	2:55.33	4 Q	2:57.80	4
Lu Dong	200 m freestyle S5	3:07.20	7 Q	3:04.96	7
Yao Cuan	200 m freestyle S5	3:03.76	5 Q	3:03.22	6
Jiang Yuyan	400 m freestyle S6	—N/a		5:12.07	1st place, gold medalist(s)
Zhang Li	400 m freestyle S6	—N/a		5:45.81	5
Zhu Ji	400 m freestyle S6	—N/a		5:52.15	7
Chen Shuling	400 m freestyle S8	5:39.53	13	Did not advance	
Zheng Tingting	400 m freestyle S8	5:02.27	2 Q	5:00.25 AS	4
Zhu Hui	400 m freestyle S8	5:48.21	15	Did not advance	
Xu Jialing	400 m freestyle S9	4:53.21	5 Q	5:01.18	8
Cai Liwen	400 m freestyle S11	5:25.53	5 Q	5:13.13	5
Zhang Xiaotong	400 m freestyle S11	5:11.36	4 Q	5:03.45 AS	2nd place, silver medalist(s)
Peng Qiuping	50 m backstroke S4	—N/a		52.39	4
He Shenggao	50 m backstroke S5	41.31	2 Q	39.93	2nd place, silver medalist(s)
Liu Yu	50 m backstroke S5	42.59	3 Q	42.37	3rd place, bronze medalist(s)
Lu Dong	50 m backstroke S5	39.48	1 Q	37.51	1st place, gold medalist(s)
Jiang Yuyan	100 m backstroke S6	1:23.08	2 Q	1:19.44 WR; PR	1st place, gold medalist(s)
Zhu Ji	100 m backstroke S6	1:29.82	6 Q	1:29.97	6
Lu Weiyuan	100 m backstroke S8	1:22.89	8 Q	1:25.62	8
Zheng Tingting	100 m backstroke S8	1:20.55	4 Q	1:18.96 AS	4
Zhu Hui	100 m backstroke S8	1:23.61	10 R	Did not advance	
Chen Yi	100 m backstroke S10	1:12.21	9 R	Did not advance	
Zhang Meng	100 m backstroke S10	1:19.34	14	Did not advance	
Cai Liwen	100 m backstroke S11	1:15.62	1 Q	1:14.02	1st place, gold medalist(s)
Li Guizhi	100 m backstroke S11	1:17.00	2 Q	1:16.17	2nd place, silver medalist(s)
Ma Jia	100 m backstroke S11	1:19.76	7 Q	1:17.13	4
Zheng Jietong	100 m backstroke S12	1:18.15	9 R	Did not advance	
Cheng Jiao	100 m breaststroke SB4	1:50.16	1 Q	1:51.70	3rd place, bronze medalist(s)
Liu Yu	100 m breaststroke SB4	1:54.79	4 Q	1:52.78	4
Yao Cuan	100 m breaststroke SB4	1:55.34	5 Q	1:54.81	5
Zhang Li	100 m breaststroke SB5	1:43.68	2 Q	1:43.17 AS	2nd place, silver medalist(s)
He Shenggao	100 m breaststroke SB6	—N/a		1:37.77	4
Liu Daomin	100 m breaststroke SB6	—N/a		1:32.25	2nd place, silver medalist(s)
Chen Shuling	100 m breaststroke SB7	1:42.54	6 Q	1:42.28	7
Jiang Shengnan	100 m breaststroke SB8	1:29.95	11	Did not advance	
Zhu Hui	100 m breaststroke SB8	1:28.67	10 R	Did not advance	
Zhang Meng	100 m breaststroke SB9	1:15.56	2 Q	1:15.05 AS	2nd place, silver medalist(s)
Cai Liwen	100 m breaststroke SB11	1:32.97	8 Q	1:30.99	7
Ma Jia	100 m breaststroke SB11	1:25.06	2 Q	1:19.24 AS	2nd place, silver medalist(s)
Zhang Xiaotong	100 m breaststroke SB11	1:26.79	4 Q	1:24.20	4
Zheng Jietong	100 m breaststroke SB12	1:21.91	3 Q	1:20.03 AS	3rd place, bronze medalist(s)
Cheng Jiao	50 m butterfly S5	46.01	4 Q	45.60	4
He Shenggao	50 m butterfly S5	43.11	2 Q	38.98	2nd place, silver medalist(s)
Lu Dong	50 m butterfly S5	40.50	1 Q	38.17 WR; PR	1st place, gold medalist(s)
Jiang Yuyan	50 m butterfly S6	36.51	1 Q	35.03	1st place, gold medalist(s)
Liu Daomin	50 m butterfly S6	38.07	4 Q	37.10	2nd place, silver medalist(s)
Zhu Ji	50 m butterfly S6	39.74	8 Q	39.37	8
Jiang Shengnan	100 m butterfly S8	1:16.31	6 Q	1:14.90	7
Lu Weiyuan	100 m butterfly S8	1:15.76	4 Q	1:14.12	5
Zhu Hui	100 m butterfly S8	1:17.22	8 Q	1:14.36	6
Liu Ying	100 m butterfly S9	1:12.87	7 Q	1:11.85	7
Xu Jialing	100 m butterfly S9	1:10.58	6 Q	1:08.83	5
Chen Yi	100 m butterfly S10	1:09.80	8 Q	1:08.36	6
Peng Qiuping	150 m individual medley SM4	3:02.76	5 Q	3:00.93	5
Cheng Jiao	200 m individual medley SM5	3:30.05	1 Q	3:26.33	3rd place, bronze medalist(s)
He Shenggao	200 m individual medley SM5	3:38.41	4 Q	3:17.99	1st place, gold medalist(s)
Lu Dong	200 m individual medley SM5	3:36.21	3 Q	3:18.47	2nd place, silver medalist(s)
Jiang Yuyan	200 m individual medley SM6	DSQ			
Liu Daomin	200 m individual medley SM6	3:07.36	4 Q	3:03.60	3rd place, bronze medalist(s)
Zhu Ji	200 m individual medley SM6	3:15.89	6 Q	3:08.31	5
Jiang Shengnan	200 m individual medley SM8	2:53.16	9 R	Did not advance	
Lu Weiyuan	200 m individual medley SM8	2:52.74	7 Q	2:50.48	7
Zhu Hui	200 m individual medley SM8	2:53.10	8 Q	2:49.90	6
Liu Ying	200 m individual medley SM9	2:45.35	11	Did not advance	
Xu Jialing	200 m individual medley SM9	2:42.98	8 Q	2:41.87	8
Chen Yi	200 m individual medley SM10	DSQ			
Zhang Meng	200 m individual medley SM10	2:35.36	4 Q	2:26.81 AS	1st place, gold medalist(s)
Cai Liwen	200 m individual medley SM11	2:49.01	4 Q	2:41.83	3rd place, bronze medalist(s)
Ma Jia	200 m individual medley SM11	2:47.45	2 Q	2:38.70 AS	2nd place, silver medalist(s)
Zhang Xiaotong	200 m individual medley SM11	2:51.91	6 Q	2:43.23	5

Mixed

Athlete	Event	Heats		Final	
Athlete	Event	Result	Rank	Result	Rank
Guo Jincheng; He Shenggao; Lu Dong; Wang Lichao	4 × 50 m freestyle relay 20pts	2:27.52	3 Q	2:14.98 WR; PR	1st place, gold medalist(s)
Jiang Yuyan; Xie Zhili; Xu Haijiao; Zhang Meng	4 × 100 m freestyle relay 34pts	—N/a		4:08.30	6
Deng Jieqiu; Hua Dongdong; Li Guizhi; Zheng Jietong	4 × 100 m freestyle relay 49pts	—N/a		4:14.80	7
Jiang Yuyan; Wang Jingang; Yao Cuan; Zou Liankang	4 × 50 m medley relay 20pts	2:41.07	2 Q	2:24.83 WR; PR	1st place, gold medalist(s)
Liu Fengqi; Lu Weiyuan; Tang Shuyuan; Xu Jialing	4 × 100 m medley relay 34pts	4:37.91	6 Q	4:29.56	4

== Table tennis ==
China entered twenty-one athletes for the Paralympic games. All of them qualified for Paris 2024 by virtue of their gold medal results, in their respective class, through the 2022 Asian Para Games in Hangzhou; meanwhile the other athletes qualified through the allocations of ITTF final world ranking.

Men

Athlete	Event	Round of 32	Round of 16	Quarterfinals	Semifinals	Final	
Athlete	Event	Opposition Result	Opposition Result	Opposition Result	Opposition Result	Opposition Result	Rank
Feng Panfeng	Individual C3	Bye	Judge (IRL); W 3–0	Brüchle (GER); W 3–1	Jang (KOR); W 3–0	Schmidberger (GER); W 3–0	1st place, gold medalist(s)
Zhai Xiang	Individual C3	Bye	Quijada (VEN); W 3–0	Glinbancheun (THA); L 0–3	Did not advance		
Liu Fu	Individual C5	—N/a	Öztürk (TUR); L 2–3	Did not advance			
Cao Ningning	Individual C5	—N/a	Huo (AUS); W 3–0	Cheng (TPE); L 1–3	Did not advance		
Huang Jiaxin	Individual C6	—N/a	Valera (ESP); L 1–3	Did not advance			
Chao Chen	Individual C6	—N/a	Rau (GER); L 0–3	Did not advance			
Yan Shuo	Individual C7	—N/a	Morales (ESP); W 3–1	Youssef (EGY); W 3–0	Punpoo (THA); W 3–2	Bayley (GBR); W 3–2	1st place, gold medalist(s)
Liao Keli	Individual C7	—N/a	Schnake (GER); L 0–3	Did not advance			
Zhao Shuai	Individual C8	Bye	Ledoux (BEL); W 3–0	McKibbin (GBR); W 3–0	Nikolenko (UKR); W 3–2	Didukh (UKR); L 2–3	2nd place, silver medalist(s)
Peng Weinan	Individual C8	Manara (BRA); W 3–0	Grudzień (POL); W 3–2	Wangphonphathanasiri (THA); L 1–3	Did not advance		
Zhao Yiqing	Individual C9	—N/a	Gustafsson (SWE); L 0–3	Did not advance			
Liu Chaodong	Individual C9	—N/a	Cardona (ESP); L 1–3	Did not advance			
Lian Hao	Individual C10	—N/a	Olufemi (NGR); W 3–0	Misztal (POL); W 3–1	Radović (MNE); W 3–1	Chojnowski (POL); L 2–3	2nd place, silver medalist(s)
Liu Fu; Zhai Xiang	Doubles MD8	—N/a	Merrien / Aira (FRA); W 3–1	Schmidberger / Baus (GER); L 2–3	Did not advance		
Cao Ningning; Feng Panfeng	Doubles MD8	—N/a	Petruniv / Yezyk (UKR); W 3–0	Thomas / Martin (FRA); W 3–0	Chaiwut / Glinbancheun (THA); W 3–2	Schmidberger / Baus (GER); W 3–0	1st place, gold medalist(s)
Huang Jiaxin; Peng Weinan	Doubles MD14	—N/a	Farinloye / Alabi (NGR); W 3–0	Thainiyom / Wangphonphathanasiri (THA); L 1–3	Did not advance		
Liao Keli; Yan Shuo	Doubles MD14	—N/a	Bye	Pino / Torres (CHI); W 3–0	Herrault / Berthier (FRA); W 3–0	Thainiyom / Wangphonphathanasiri (THA); W 3–1	1st place, gold medalist(s)
Liu Chaodong; Zhao Yiqing	Doubles MD18	Leibovitz / Seidenfeld (USA); W 3–0	Kats / Mai (UKR); W 3–0	Chudzicki / Misztal (POL); W 3–1	Massad / Manara (BRA); W 3–1	Chojnowski / Grudzień (POL); L 0–3	2nd place, silver medalist(s)
Lian Hao; Zhao Shuai	Doubles MD18	Bye	Diaz / Ruiz (ESP); W 3–1	Ledoux / Devos (BEL); W 3–0	Chojnowski / Grudzień (POL); L 1–3	Did not advance	3rd place, bronze medalist(s)

Women

Athlete	Event	Round of 16	Quarterfinals	Semifinals	Final / BM	
Athlete	Event	Opposition Result	Opposition Result	Opposition Result	Opposition Result	Rank
Liu Jing	Individual C1–2	Bye	Bootwansirina (THA); W 3–1	Seo (KOR); W 3–2	Rossi (ITA); L 0–3	2nd place, silver medalist(s)
Xue Juan	Individual C3	Brunelli (ITA); W 3–0	Lee (KOR); W 3–1	Mužinić (CRO); L 1–3	Did not advance	3rd place, bronze medalist(s)
Gu Xiaodan	Individual C4	Abdelhak (EGY); W 3–1	Jaion (THA); W 3–0	Mikolaschek (GER); L 1–3	Did not advance	3rd place, bronze medalist(s)
Zhou Ying	Individual C4	Di Toro (AUS); W 3–0	Patel (IND); W 3–1	Perić (SRB); L 2–3	Did not advance	3rd place, bronze medalist(s)
Pan Jiamin	Individual C5	Bye	Leonelli (CHI); W 3–0	Jung (KOR); W 3–1	Zhang (CHN); L 1–3	2nd place, silver medalist(s)
Zhang Bian	Individual C5	Bye	Marlina (INA); W 3–0	Moon (KOR); W 3–1	Pan (CHN); W 3–1	1st place, gold medalist(s)
Jin Yucheng	Individual C6	Marszal (POL); L 1–3	Did not advance			
Wang Rui	Individual C7	Bye	Kim (KOR); W 3–0	van Zon (NED); L 1–3	Did not advance	3rd place, bronze medalist(s)
Huang Wenjuan	Individual C8	Bye	Kelmer (BRA); W 3–0	Pérez (CHI); W 3–0	Dahlen (NOR); W 3–0	1st place, gold medalist(s)
Mao Jingdian	Individual C9	Bye	Pęk (POL); L 0–3	Did not advance		
Xiong Guiyan	Individual C9	Bye	Shynkarova (UKR); W 3–0	Lei (AUS); W 3–2	Pęk (POL); L 2–3	2nd place, silver medalist(s)
Hou Chunxiao	Individual C10	Händén (SWE); L 0–3	Did not advance			
Liu Jing; Xue Juan	Doubles WD5	—N/a	Santos / Maia (BRA); W 3–0	Asayut / Bootwansirina (THA); W 3–1	Yoon / Seo (KOR); W 3–1	1st place, gold medalist(s)
Zhou Ying; Zhang Bian	Doubles WD10	Bye	Lee / Kang (KOR); L 2–3	Did not advance		
Gu Xiaodan; Pan Jiamin	Doubles WD10	Bye	Mužinić / Karić (CRO); W 3–1	Jung / Moon (KOR); W 3–0	Matić / Perić (SRB); W 3–1	1st place, gold medalist(s)
Huang Wenjuan; Jin Yucheng	Doubles WD14	—N/a	Alieva / Litvinenko (NPA); W 3–1	Twomey / Pickard (GBR); W 3–1	Wolf / Grebe (GER); W 3–1	1st place, gold medalist(s)
Liu Meng; Mao Jingdian	Doubles WD20	Arlóy / Szvitacs (HUN); W 3–2	Lei / Yang (AUS); L 0–3	Did not advance		
Hou Chunxiao; Xiong Guiyan	Doubles WD20	Kelmer / Parinos (BRA); W 3–0	Pęk / Partyka (POL); L 2–3	Did not advance		

Mixed

Athlete	Event	Round of 32	Round of 16	Quarterfinals	Semifinals	Final / BM	
Athlete	Event	Opposition Result	Opposition Result	Opposition Result	Opposition Result	Opposition Result	Rank
Feng Panfeng; Zhou Ying	Doubles XD7	Bye	Arabian / Oliveira (BRA); W 3–1	Trávníček / Kánová (SVK); W 3–1	Merrien / Vautier (FRA); W 3–0	Glinbancheun / Jaion (THA); W 3–1	1st place, gold medalist(s)
Zhai Xiang; Gu Xiaodan	Doubles XD7	Bye	Czuper / Bucław (POL); W 3–0	Kim / Yoon (KOR); W 3–0	Glinbancheun / Jaion (THA); L 1–3	Did not advance	3rd place, bronze medalist(s)
Zhao Shuai; Mao Jingdian	Doubles XD17	Bye	Montanus / van Zon (NED); W 3–2	Stacey / Twomey (GBR); W 3–0	Didukh / Shynkarova (UKR); W 3–2	Peng / Xiong (CHN); W 3–0	1st place, gold medalist(s)
Peng Weinan; Xiong Guiyan	Doubles XD17	Bye	Bohéas / Caillaud (FRA); W 3–0	Zohil / Lučić (CRO); W 3–0	Grudzień / Pęk (POL); W 3–2	Zhao / Mao (CHN); L 0–3	2nd place, silver medalist(s)

== Taekwondo ==
China entered four athletes to compete at the Paralympics competition. Shao Qian and Li Yujie qualified for the games, after nominated one of the top five highest eligible athletes at final Olympics ranking; meanwhile Liu Ludong and Yao Yinan, qualified for Paris 2024, following the triumph of their gold medal results in their respective classes, through the 2024 Asian Qualification Tournament in Tai'an, China.

Athlete	Event	Round of 16	Quarterfinals	Semifinals	Repechage	Final / BM	
Athlete	Event	Opposition Result	Opposition Result	Opposition Result	Opposition Result	Opposition Result	Rank
Liu Ludong	Men's +80 kg	Figuereo (DOM); W 17–12	Haghshenas (IRI); L 16–19	Did not advance	Keita (SEN); L 11–13	Did not advance	
Shao Qian	Women's –52 kg	Rahimi (IRI); L 2–13	Did not advance				
Li Yujie	Women's –57 kg	Bye	Caverzan (FRA); W 19–5	Fernandes (BRA); W 17–13	Bye	Gürdal (TUR); W 11–0	1st place, gold medalist(s)
Yao Yinan	Women's –65 kg	Fuentes (CHI); W 30–0	Munro (GBR); W 20–16	Diallo (FRA); L 12–18	Bye	Gkentzou (GRE); L 4–14	5

== Wheelchair basketball ==
Summary

Team	Event	Group Stage				Quarterfinal	Semifinal	Final / BM	
Team	Event	Opposition Score	Opposition Score	Opposition Score	Rank	Opposition Score	Opposition Score	Opposition Score	Rank
China women's	Women's tournament	Canada; W 70–65	Spain; W 64–38	Great Britain; W 67–42	1 Q	Japan; W 62–50	United States; L 47–50	Canada; W 65–43	3rd place, bronze medalist(s)

=== Women's tournament ===
China women's have qualified to compete at Paris 2024, by winning the gold medal at the 2024 IWBF Asia-Oceania Championships in Bangkok, Thailand.

Team roster

The following is the China roster in the women's wheelchair basketball tournament of the 2024 Summer Paralympics.

China women's national wheelchair basketball team - 2024 Summer Paralympics roster
Players
Coaches

No.	Name	Age – Date of birth	Pts.
5	Xuejing Chen	30 – 1 September 1993	1.0
6	Xuemei Zhang	30 – 25 October 1993	4.0
7	Tonglei Zhang	30 – 5 September 1993	1.5
8	Guidi Lyu	31 – 6 May 1993	4.0
9	Suiling Lin	33 – 26 February 1991	3.0
10	Xiaolian Huang	33 – 20 September 1990	2.0
11	Jingwen Chen	22 – 28 November 2001	1.0
12	Qiaoling Qiu	25 – 15 March 1999	4.5
13	Meimei Zhang	21 – 30 September 2002	1.5
15	Yun Long	35 – 1 August 1989	1.5
16	Jiameng Dai	29 – 7 July 1995	4.5
17	Xiang He	23 – 22 May 2001	4.5

Head coach

Qi Chen

Assistant coach(es)

Yan Han Cintas

Legend

- Age - describes age on 29 August 2024

Preliminary round

Pos	Team	Pld	W	L	PF	PA	PD	Pts	
1	China	3	3	0	196	150	+46	6	Quarter-finals
2	Canada	3	2	1	209	173	+36	5	Quarter-finals
3	Great Britain	3	1	2	170	159	+11	4	Quarter-finals
4	Spain	3	0	3	121	214	−93	3	Quarter-finals

Source: Paris 2024
Rules for classification: 1) Points; 2) Head-to-head results; 3) Points difference; 4) Points scored.

29 August 2024
18:15

Report

Canada	65–70	China
Scoring by quarter: 15–19, 18–18, 22–16, 10–17
Pts: Dandeneau 28; Rebs: Dandeneau 9 Asts: Dandeneau 7		Pts: X. Zhang 30; Rebs: X. Zhang 7 Asts: T. Zhang 12

Bercy Arena, Paris
Attendance: 12.682
Referees: Celine Villard

30 August 2024
21:30

Report

China	64–38	Spain
Scoring by quarter: 25–7, 14–12, 7–15, 18–4
Pts: T. Zhang 18; Rebs: Lyu, Huang 4 Asts: Lin 9		Pts: Zudaire 12; Rebs: Zudaire 8 Asts: Zudaire 7

Bercy Arena, Paris
Attendance: 9.265
Referees: Shunsuke Nikaido

1 September 2024
16:00

Report

Great Britain	42–67	China
Scoring by quarter: 9–16, 13–18, 9–11, 16–17
Pts: Love 15; Rebs: Love 6 Asts: Williams 5		Pts: T. Zhang 16; Rebs: X. Zhang 10; Asts: Lin 10

Bercy Arena, Paris
Attendance: 12.725
Referees: Blaine Krapljanov

Quarterfinal

4 September 2024
12:45

Report

China	62–50	Japan
Scoring by quarter: 22-6, 14-15, 14-11, 12-18
Pts: X. Zhang 16; Rebs: Chen 5 Asts: Lin 8		Pts: Amimoto 15; Rebs: Amimoto 13; Asts: Amimoto 6

Bercy Arena, Paris
Attendance: 11,430
Referees: Erik Etzelmueller

Semifinal

6 September 2024
16:00

Report

China	47–50	United States
Scoring by quarter: 14–12, 12–11, 10–17, 11–10
Pts: Lin 15; Rebs: X. Zhang, Lyu 8 Asts: Lin 10		Pts: Hollermann 20; Rebs: Murray 9 Asts: Hollermann, Zurbrugg 6

Bercy Arena, Paris
Attendance: 12.527
Referees: Drazen Strok

Bronze medal game

8 September 2024
10:30

Report

China	65–43	Canada
Scoring by quarter: 19–11, 16–6, 16–8, 14–18
Pts: T. Zhang 16; Rebs: X. Zhang 7 Asts: Lin 12		Pts: Young 12; Rebs: Dandeneau 9 Asts: Dandeneau, Young 5

Bercy Arena, Paris
Attendance: 12.576
Referees: Yekta Koç

== Wheelchair fencing ==
Men

Athlete	Event	Round of 32	Round of 16	Quarterfinal	Semifinal	Repechage 1	Repechage 2	Repechage 3	Repechage 4	Final / BM	
Athlete	Event	Opposition Result	Opposition Result	Opposition Result	Opposition Result	Opposition Result	Opposition Result	Opposition Result	Opposition Result	Opposition Result	Rank
Sun Gang	Individual épée A	Bye	Pender (POL); W 15–13	Manko (UKR); W 15–7	Lambertini (ITA); W 15–4	Bye				Gilliver (GBR); W 15–12	1st place, gold medalist(s)
Tian Jianquan	Individual épée A	Bye	Al-Ogaili (IRQ); W 15–9	Gilliver (GBR); L 12–15	Did not advance	Bye	Al-Madhkhoori (IRQ); W 15–10	Rossi (ITA); W 15–13	Lambertini (ITA); L 13–15	Did not advance	
Hu Daoliang	Individual épée B	Bye	Peter (FRA); W 15–11	Dąbrowski (POL); L 5–15	Did not advance	Bye	Grueso (RPT); W 15–8	Naumenko (UKR); W 15–12	Zhang (CHN); L 9–15	Did not advance	
Zhang Jie	Individual épée B	Bye	Tarjányi (HUN); W 15–9	Guissone (BRA); W 15–8	Kingmanaw (THA); L 13–15	Bye			Hu (CHN); W 15–9	Dąbrowski (POL); L 14–15	4
Sun Gang	Individual foil A	Bye	Watson (GBR); W 15–2	Lambertini (ITA); W 15–9	Zhong (CHN); W 15–7	Bye				Betti (ITA); W 15–3	1st place, gold medalist(s)
Zhong Saichun	Individual foil A	Bye	Pender (POL); W 15–3	Tokatlian (FRA); W 15–5	Sun (CHN); L 7–15	Bye			Osváth (HUN); W 15–4	Lambertini (ITA); W 15–6	3rd place, bronze medalist(s)
Hu Daoliang	Individual foil B	—N/a	Ali (IRQ); W 15–4	Valet (FRA); W 15–8	Feng (CHN); L 9–15	Bye			Massa (ITA); W 15–4	Serozhenko (UKR); W 15–5	3rd place, bronze medalist(s)
Feng Yanke	Individual foil B	—N/a	Fujita (JPN); W 15–8	Guissone (BRA); W 15–3	Hu (CHN); W 15–9	Bye				Coutya (GBR); L 7–15	2nd place, silver medalist(s)
Tian Jianquan	Individual sabre A	—N/a	Lemoine (FRA); W 15–6	Giordan (ITA); W 15–6	Schmidt (GER); L 12–15	Bye			Demchuk (UKR); L 9–15	Did not advance	
Zhong Saichun	Individual sabre A	—N/a	Giordan (ITA); L 6–15	Did not advance		Lemoine (FRA); L 6–15	Did not advance				
Feng Yanke	Individual sabre B	—N/a	Hanssen (USA); W 15–4	Tarjányi (HUN); W 15–9	Zhang (CHN); W 15–10	Bye				Dąbrowski (POL); W 15–14	1st place, gold medalist(s)
Zhang Jie	Individual sabre B	—N/a	Serozhenko (UKR); W 15–4	Valet (FRA); W 15–7	Feng (CHN); L 10–15	Bye			Serozhenko (UKR); W 15–5	Castro (POL); W 15–7	3rd place, bronze medalist(s)
Tian Jianquan; Sun Gang; Zhang Jie; Zhong Saichun	Team épée	—N/a	Bye	Italy (ITA); W 45–33	Poland (POL); W 45–20	—N/a				Iraq (IRQ); W 45–36	1st place, gold medalist(s)
Sun Gang; Feng Yanke; Zhong Saichun; Tian Jianquan	Team foil	—N/a	Bye	Poland (POL); W 45–26	Italy (ITA); W 45–36	—N/a				Great Britain (GBR); W 45–34	1st place, gold medalist(s)

Women

Athlete	Event	Round of 32	Round of 16	Quarterfinal	Semifinal	Repechage 1	Repechage 2	Repechage 3	Repechage 4	Final / BM	
Athlete	Event	Opposition Result	Opposition Result	Opposition Result	Opposition Result	Opposition Result	Opposition Result	Opposition Result	Opposition Result	Opposition Result	Rank
Chen Yuandong	Individual épée A	Bye	Thongdaeng (THA); W 15–4	Menéndez (ESP); W 15–7	Gu (CHN); W 15–9	Bye				Kwon (KOR); W 15–6	1st place, gold medalist(s)
Gu Haiyan	Individual épée A	Bye	Breus (UKR); W 14–9	Fidrych (POL); W 15–13	Chen (CHN); L 9–15	Bye			Breus (UKR); W 15–5	Fidrych (POL); W 15–12	3rd place, bronze medalist(s)
Ao Lanzhu	Individual épée B	—N/a	Geddes (USA); W 15–2	Cho (KOR); W 15–10	Kang (CHN); L 14–15	Bye			Fedota (UKR); L 13–15	Did not advance	
Kang Su	Individual épée B	—N/a	Demaude (FRA); W 15–8	Pasquino (ITA); W 15–13	Ao (CHN); W 15–14	Bye				Jana (THA); L 7–15	2nd place, silver medalist(s)
Gu Haiyan	Individual foil A	Bye	Vide (FRA); W 15–5	Kwon (KOR); W 15–5	Yu (HKG); W 15–13	Bye				Zou (CHN); L 12–15	2nd place, silver medalist(s)
Zou Xufeng	Individual foil A	Bye	Krajnyák (HUN); W 15–8	Hajmási (HUN); W 15–12	Menéndez (ESP); W 15–12	Bye				Gu (CHN); W 15–12	1st place, gold medalist(s)
Kang Su	Individual foil B	—N/a	Xiao (CHN); L 12–15	Did not advance		Jaimez (VEN); W 15–4	Chung (HKG); W 15–9	Khetsuriani (GEO); W 15–7	Vio (ITA); L 7–15	Did not advance	
Xiao Rong	Individual foil B	—N/a	Kang (CHN); W 15–12	Tong (HKG); W 15–9	Vio (ITA); W 15–9	Bye				Jana (THA); L 11–15	2nd place, silver medalist(s)
Gu Haiyan	Individual sabre A	Bye	Mogoș (ITA); W 15–2	Vide (FRA); W 15–9	Tibilashvili (GEO); W 15–6	Bye				Dróżdż (POL); W 15–10	1st place, gold medalist(s)
Zou Xufeng	Individual sabre A	Veras (BRA); W 15–3	Dróżdż (POL); L 6–15	Did not advance		Breus (UKR); L 12–15	Did not advance				
Ao Lanzhu	Individual sabre B	—N/a	Mező (HUN); L 5–15	Did not advance		Demaude (FRA); W 15–2	Pasquino (ITA); W 15–14	Cho (KOR); W 15–6	Khetsuriani (GEO); W 15–8	Fedota (UKR); L 3–15	4
Xiao Rong	Individual sabre B	—N/a	Demaude (FRA); W 15–3	Mező (HUN); W 15–4	Khetsuriani (GEO); W 15–5	Bye				Jana (THA); L 14–15	2nd place, silver medalist(s)
Gu Haiyan; Zou Xufeng; Kang Su; Chen Yuandong	Team épée	—N/a	Brazil (BRA); W 45–23	Hungary (HUN); W 45–27	France (FRA); W 45–35	—N/a				Ukraine (UKR); W 45–37	1st place, gold medalist(s)
Chen Yuandong; Gu Haiyan; Xiao Rong; Zou Xufeng	Team foil	—N/a	Bye	South Korea (KOR); W 45–22	Italy (ITA); W 45–41	—N/a				Hungary (HUN); W 45–34	1st place, gold medalist(s)

== Wheelchair tennis ==
China qualified six wheelchair tennis players via the ITF world rankings as at 15 July 2024.

Athlete	Event	Round of 64	Round of 32	Round of 16	Quarterfinals	Semifinals	Final / BM	
Athlete	Event	Opposition Result	Opposition Result	Opposition Result	Opposition Result	Opposition Result	Opposition Result	Rank
Ding Junhui	Men's singles	Boukartacha (MAR); W 6–1, 2–6, 6–4	Miki (JPN); L 2–6, 1–6	Did not advance				
Dong Shunjiang	Men's singles	Habal (IRQ); W 6–4, 6–7, 6–1	Egberink (NED); L 0–6, 0–6	Did not advance				
Ji Zhenxu	Men's singles	Siscar (ESP); W 6–1, 6–4	Spaargaren (NED); L 3–6, 4–6	Did not advance				
Dong Shunjiang; Ji Zhenxu	Men's doubles	—N/a	Laget / Menguy (FRA); W 6–3, 6–2	Oda / Miki (JPN); L 4–6, 0–6	Did not advance			
Guo Luoyao	Women's singles	—N/a	Montjane (RSA); W w/o	Ohtani (JPN); W 6–4, 7–6	de Groot (NED); L 6–7, 3–6	Did not advance		
Li Xiaohui	Women's singles	—N/a	Mathewson (USA); W 5–7, 6–3, 6–4	Shuker (GBR); W 6–0, 6–2	van Koot (NED); L 1–6, 5–7	Did not advance		
Wang Ziying	Women's singles	—N/a	Bos (NED); W 6–1, 6–2	Phelps (USA); W 6–0, 6–3	Bernal (COL); W 6–2, 6–3	de Groot (NED); L 2–6, 1–6	van Koot (NED); L 6–7, 1–6	4
Zhu Zhenzhen	Women's singles	—N/a	de Greef (NED); W 6–1, 1–6, 6–2	Cabrillana (CHI); W 6–0, 6–4	Kamiji (JPN); L 1–6, 2–6	Did not advance		
Guo Luoyao; Wang Ziying	Women's doubles	—N/a		Awane / Benichi (MAR); W 6–1, 6–1	Rodríguez / Bernal (COL); W 6–1, 6–4	Tanaka / Kamiji (JPN); L 0–6, 1–6	Li / Zhu (CHN); W 7–6, 6–3	3rd place, bronze medalist(s)
Li Xiaohui; Zhu Zhenzhen	Women's doubles	—N/a		Bye	Montjane / Venter (RSA); W w/o	de Groot / van Koot (NED); L 2–6, 2–6	Guo / Wang (CHN); L 6–7, 3–6	4

== See also ==
- China at the 2024 Summer Olympics
- China at the Paralympics
