= Swimming at the 2024 Summer Paralympics – Men's 100 metre freestyle S5 =

Men's 100 metre freestyle S5 at the XVII Paralympic Games
- Venue: La Défense Arena
- Date: 30 August 2024
- Competitors: 12 from 9 nations
- Winning time: 1:07.77

Medalists
| 1st place, gold medalist(s) | | Oleksandr Komarov | Ukraine |
| 2nd place, silver medalist(s) | | Guo Jincheng | China |
| 3rd place, bronze medalist(s) | | Kirill Pulver | Neutral Paralympic Athletes |

The men's 100 metre freestyle swimming (S5) event at the 2024 Summer Paralympics took place on 30 August 2024, at the La Défense Arena in Paris.

== Records ==
Prior to the competition, the existing world and Paralympic records were as follows.

| World Record | Antonio Fantin (ITA) | 1:06.24 | Bologna, Italy | 3 March 2019 |
| Paralympic Record | Daniel Dias (BRA) | 1:08.39 | London, Great Britain | 2 September 2012 |

== Results ==
=== Heats ===
The heats were started at 09:30.

| Rank | Heat | Lane | Name | Nationality | Time | Notes |
|---|---|---|---|---|---|---|
| 1 | 1 | 4 | Kirill Pulver | Neutral Paralympic Athletes | 1:10.53 | Q |
| 2 | 2 | 4 | Oleksandr Komarov | Ukraine | 1:11.26 | Q |
| 3 | 2 | 5 | Francesco Bocciardo | Italy | 1:12.27 | Q |
| 4 | 1 | 5 | Guo Jincheng | China | 1:14.56 | Q |
| 5 | 2 | 3 | Wang Lichao | China | 1:15.39 | Q |
| 6 | 2 | 6 | Muhammad Nur Syaiful Zulkafli | Malaysia | 1:16.82 | Q |
| 7 | 2 | 2 | Luis Huerta | Spain | 1:18.98 | Q |
| 8 | 1 | 2 | Eigo Tanaka | Japan | 1:20.13 | Q |
| 9 | 2 | 7 | Phuchit Aingchaiyaphum | Thailand | 1:21.51 | |
| 10 | 1 | 6 | Kaede Hinata | Japan | 1:22.40 | |
| 11 | 1 | 7 | Alexandros Lergios | Greece | 1:23.01 | |
| | 1 | 3 | Yuan Weiyi | China | Disqualified | |

=== Final ===
The final was held at 17:30.

| Rank | Lane | Name | Nationality | Time | Notes |
|---|---|---|---|---|---|
| 1st place, gold medalist(s) | 5 | Oleksandr Komarov | Ukraine | 1:07.77 | PR |
| 2nd place, silver medalist(s) | 6 | Guo Jincheng | China | 1:08.22 | AS |
| 3rd place, bronze medalist(s) | 4 | Kirill Pulver | Neutral Paralympic Athletes | 1:09.41 | |
| 4 | 3 | Francesco Bocciardo | Italy | 1:10.53 | |
| 5 | 2 | Wang Lichao | China | 1:11.94 | |
| 6 | 7 | Muhammad Nur Syaiful Zulkafli | Malaysia | 1:16.60 | |
| 7 | 1 | Luis Huerta | Spain | 1:19.05 | |
| 8 | 8 | Eigo Tanaka | Japan | 1:19.65 | |
