= 2023 World Para Swimming Championships – Men's 50 metre butterfly =

The men's 50m butterfly events at the 2023 World Para Swimming Championships were held at the Manchester Aquatics Centre between 31 July and 6 August.

== Medalists ==
Event	Gold	Silver	Bronze
S5	Samuel da Silva de Oliveira; Brazil	Guo Jincheng; China	Yuan Weiyi; China
S6	Laurent Chardard; France	Wang Jingang; China	Nelson Crispín; Colombia
S7	Andrii Trusov; Ukraine	Carlos Serrano Zárate; Colombia	Yevhenii Bohodaiko; Ukraine

== Results ==
=== S5 ===
Heats

Nine swimmers from six nations took part. The swimmers with the top eight times, regardless of heat, advanced to the final.

Rank	Heat	Lane	Name	Nation	Result	Notes
1	2	4	Samuel da Silva de Oliveira	Brazil	31.74	Q, AM
2	2	4	Guo Jincheng	China	32.10	Q
3	1	5	Yuan Weiyi	China	32.89	Q
4	2	5	Wang Lichao	China	34.40	Q
5	1	3	Eigo Tanaka	Japan	34.47	Q
6	2	3	Kaede Hinata	Japan	35.05	Q
7	2	6	Siyazbek Daliyev	Kazakhstan	37.52	Q
8	1	6	Alexandros-Stylianos Lergios	Greece	40.28	Q
9	2	2	Ismail Zulfic	Bosnia and Herzegovina	45.95	

Final

The final was held on 2 August.

Rank	Athlete	Nation	Result	Notes
1st place, gold medalist(s)	Samuel da Silva de Oliveira	Brazil	31.21	CR
2nd place, silver medalist(s)	Guo Jincheng	China	31.53	
3rd place, bronze medalist(s)	Yuan Weiyi	China	31.58	
4	Wang Lichao	China	31.79	
5	Eigo Tanaka	Japan	34.68	
6	Kaede Hinata	Japan	35.55	
7	Siyazbek Daliyev	Kazakhstan	35.90	
8	Alexandros-Stylianos Lergios	Greece	40.01	

=== S6 ===
Heats

Thirteen swimmers from eight nations took part. The swimmers with the top eight times, regardless of heat, advanced to the final.

Rank	Heat	Lane	Name	Nation	Result	Notes
1	1	5	Wang Jingang	China	31.32	Q
2	1	4	Laurent Chardard	France	31.47	Q
3	2	4	Nelson Crispín	Colombia	32.26	Q
4	2	3	David Sanchez Sierra	Spain	33.10	Q
5	1	6	Jia Hongguang	China	33.14	Q
6	2	5	Talisson Glock	Brazil	33.36	Q
7	2	6	Yang Hong	China	33.94	Q
8	2	7	Jesus Gutierrez Bermudez	Mexico	33.97	Q
9	1	3	Gabriel Melone	Brazil	34.54	
10	2	1	Aekkarin Noithat	Thailand	34.78	
11	1	7	Gary Bejino	Philippines	34.93	
12	2	2	Alejandro Rojas Cabrera	Spain	35.06	
13	1	2	Juan Jose Gutierrez Bermudez	Mexico	35.33	

Final

The final was held on 6 August.

Rank	Athlete	Nation	Result	Notes
1st place, gold medalist(s)	Laurent Chardard	France	31.03	ER
2nd place, silver medalist(s)	Wang Jingang	China	31.27	
3rd place, bronze medalist(s)	Nelson Crispín	Colombia	31.89	
4	David Sanchez Sierra	Spain	32.17	
5	Talisson Glock	Brazil	32.25	
6	Jia Hongguang	China	32.51	
7	Jesus Gutierrez Bermudez	Mexico	33.81	
8	Yang Hong	China	34.33	

=== S7 ===
Heats

Eight swimmers from eight nations took part. The swimmers with the top eight times, regardless of heat, advanced to the final.

Rank	Heat	Lane	Name	Nation	Result	Notes
1	1	4	Carlos Serrano Zárate	Colombia	29.76	Q
2	1	3	Yevhenii Bohodaiko	Ukraine	30.53	Q
3	2	3	Christian Sadie	South Africa	30.68	Q
4	2	4	Andrii Trusov	Ukraine	31.28	Q
5	1	5	Toh Wei Soong	Singapore	31.29	Q
6	2	5	Iñaki Basiloff	Argentina	31.71	Q
7	2	6	Suyash Narayan Jadhav	India	33.24	Q
8	1	6	Marian Kvasnytsia	Ukraine	34.48	Q

Final

The final was held on 4 August.

Rank	Athlete	Nation	Result	Notes
1st place, gold medalist(s)	Andrii Trusov	Ukraine	28.92	CR
2nd place, silver medalist(s)	Carlos Serrano Zárate	Colombia	29.28	
3rd place, bronze medalist(s)	Yevhenii Bohodaiko	Ukraine	29.98	
4	Iñaki Basiloff	Argentina	30.24	
5	Christian Sadie	South Africa	30.52	
6	Toh Wei Soong	Singapore	31.01	
7	Suyash Narayan Jadhav	India	33.14	
8	Marian Kvasnytsia	Ukraine		DSQ
