= 2025 World Para Swimming Championships – Men's 50 metre backstroke =

The men's 50 metre backstroke events at the 2025 World Para Swimming Championships will be held at the Singapore Aquatic Centre between 21 and 27 September 2025. Five classifications shall race over the distance.

== Schedule ==
The 50 metre backstroke events for men will be held across the following schedule:

men's 50 metre backstroke
Day	Date	Classifications
Day 1	21 Sept	
Day 2	22 Sept	S5
Day 3	23 Sept	
Day 4	24 Sept	S3; S4
Day 5	25 Sept	
Day 6	26 Sept	S1; S2
Day 7	27 Sept	

== Medal summary ==
Event	Gold	Silver	Bronze
S1	Iyad Shalabi; Israel	José Ronaldo da Silva; Brazil	Anton Kol; Ukraine
S2	Gabriel Araújo; Brazil	Vladimir Danilenko; Individual Neutral Athletes	Jacek Czech; Poland
S3	Denys Ostapchenko; Ukraine	Josia Topf; Germany	Serhii Palamarchuk; Ukraine
S4	Roman Zhdanov; Individual Neutral Athletes	Cameron Leslie; New Zealand	Arnošt Petráček; Czech Republic
S5	Yuan Weiyi; China	Guo Jincheng; China	Samuel de Oliveira; Brazil

== Race summaries ==
=== S1 ===
The men's 50 metre backstroke S1 event was held on 26 September. Seven swimmers took part in a direct final.

The relevant records at the beginning of the event were as follows:

Record	Athlete	Time	Date	City	Country
World	Hennadii Boiko (UKR)	0:59.96	2016-09-09	Rio de Janeiro	Brazil
Championship	Kamil Otowski (POL)	1:07.34	2023-08-05	Manchester	United Kingdom
Americas	José Ronaldo da Silva (BRA)	1:13.15	2025-09-05	São Paulo	Brazil
Asian	Alireza Jalili (IRI)	1:37.84	2018-10-07	Jakarta	Indonesia
European	Hennadii Boiko (UKR)	0:59.96	2016-09-09	Rio de Janeiro	Brazil

==== Final ====
Rank	Lane	Athlete	Class	Result	Notes
1st place, gold medalist(s)	4	Iyad Shalabi (ISR)	S1	1:11.16	
2nd place, silver medalist(s)	6	José Ronaldo da Silva (BRA)	S1	1:13.72	
3rd place, bronze medalist(s)	3	Anton Kol (UKR)	S1	1:14.82	
4	5	Francesco Bettella (ITA)	S1	1:14.90	
5	2	Dimitrios Karypidis (GRE)	S1	1:32.55	
6	7	Nikolaos Kontou (GRE)	S1	1:43.39	
7	1	Miguel Navarro (ESP)	S1	1:55.56	

=== S2 ===
The men's 50 metre backstroke S2 event was held on 26 September. Nine swimmers took part, with the top eight progressing to the final.

The relevant records at the beginning of the event were as follows:

Record	Athlete	Time	Date	City	Country
World	Zou Liankang (CHN)	0:47.17	2016-09-15	Rio de Janeiro	Brazil
Championship	Zou Liankang (CHN)	0:48.62	2017-12-04	Mexico City	Mexico
African	David Mc Klopper (RSA)	2:03.34	2016-03-22	Bloemfontein	South Africa
Americas	Gabriel Araújo (BRA)	0:50.93	2024-08-31	Paris	France
Asian	Zou Liankang (CHN)	0:47.17	2016-09-15	Rio de Janeiro	Brazil
European	Serhii Palamarchuk (UKR)	0:50.23	2016-09-15	Rio de Janeiro	Brazil

==== Heats ====
Rank	Heat	Lane	Athlete	Class	Result	Notes
1	1	4	Gabriel Araújo (BRA)	S2	55.60	Q
2	1	3	Vladimir Danilenko (AIN)	S2	57.39	Q
3	1	5	Jacek Czech (POL)	S2	59.68	Q
4	1	6	Alberto Abarza (CHI)	S2	1:00.22	Q
5	1	2	Rodrigo Santillan (PER)	S2	1:09.81	Q
6	1	7	Jesus Rey Lopez (MEX)	S2	1:12.71	Q
7	1	8	Muhammed Aasim Poyilil (IND)	S2	1:14.34	Q
8	1	1	Conrad Hildebrand (SWE)	S2	1:24.44	Q

==== Final ====
Rank	Lane	Athlete	Class	Result	Notes
1st place, gold medalist(s)	4	Gabriel Araújo (BRA)	S2	53.06	
2nd place, silver medalist(s)	5	Vladimir Danilenko (AIN)	S2	56.54	
3rd place, bronze medalist(s)	3	Jacek Czech (POL)	S2	57.73	
4	6	Alberto Abarza (CHI)	S2	59.81	
5	2	Rodrigo Santillan (PER)	S2	1:09.29	
6	7	Jesus Rey Lopez (MEX)	S2	1:10.29	
7	1	Muhammed Aasim Poyilil (IND)	S2	1:19.59	
8	8	Conrad Hildebrand (SWE)	S2	1:23.54	

=== S3 ===
The men's 50 metre backstroke S3 event was held on 24 September.

The relevant records at the beginning of the event were as follows:

Record	Athlete	Time	Date	City	Country
World	Min Byeong-Eon (KOR)	0:42.21	2012-09-02	London	United Kingdom
Championship	Diego López Díaz (MEX)	0:43.47	2019-09-12	London	United Kingdom
African	Amr Abdalla (EGY)	1:57.35	2021-06-18	Berlin	Germany
Americas	Diego Lopez Diaz (MEX)	0:42.39	2018-09-23	Yokohama City	Japan
Asian	Min Byeong-Eon (KOR)	0:42.21	2012-09-02	London	United Kingdom
European	Dmytro Vynohradets (UKR)	0:44.94	2016-09-10	Rio de Janeiro	Brazil
Oceania	Ahmed Kelly (AUS)	0:54.96	2024-09-02	Paris	France

==== Heats ====
Thirteen swimmers took part, with the top eight progressing to the final

Rank	Heat	Lane	Athlete	Class	Result	Notes
1	2	4	Denys Ostapchenko (UKR)	S3	46.78	Q
2	2	5	Serhii Palamarchuk (UKR)	S3	50.25	Q
3	2	6	Isaias Sono (PER)	S3	50.56	Q
4	1	4	Josia Topf (GER)	S3	51.39	Q
5	1	5	Vincenzo Boni (ITA)	S3	51.79	Q
6	2	2	Diego Lopez Diaz (MEX)	S3	52.38	Q
7	2	3	Daniel Ferrer Robles (ESP)	S3	53.05	Q
8	2	7	Krzysztof Lechniak (POL)	S3	57.41	Q
9	1	2	Ahmed Kelly (AUS)	S3	57.78	
10	1	3	Umut Unlu (TUR)	S3	57.81	
11	1	7	Patricio Larenas Albayay (CHI)	S3	1:00.11	
12	2	1	Charkorn Kaewsri (THA)	S3	1:03.23	
13	1	6	Igor Bobyrev (AIN)	S3	1:19.79	

==== Final ====
Rank	Lane	Athlete	Class	Result	Notes
1st place, gold medalist(s)	4	Denys Ostapchenko (UKR)	S3	46.06	
2nd place, silver medalist(s)	6	Josia Topf (GER)	S3	47.10	
3rd place, bronze medalist(s)	5	Serhii Palamarchuk (UKR)	S3	49.48	
4	1	Daniel Ferrer Robles (ESP)	S3	50.44	
5	3	Isaias Sono (PER)	S3	50.77	
6	2	Vincenzo Boni (ITA)	S3	51.40	
7	7	Diego López Díaz (MEX)	S3	52.25	
8	8	Krzysztof Lechniak (POL)	S3	58.93	

=== S4 ===
The men's 50 metre backstroke S4 event was held on 24 September.

The relevant records at the beginning of the event were as follows:

Record	Athlete	Time	Date	City	Country
World	Roman Zhdanov (IPC)	0:40.99	2021-09-03	Tokyo	Japan
Championship	Roman Zhdanov (RUS)	0:41.50	2019-09-12	London	United Kingdom
Americas	Ángel Camacho Ramirez (MEX)	0:42.57	2024-05-31	Berlin	Germany
Asian	Liu Yuntao (CHN)	0:44.42	2016-09-16	Rio de Janeiro	Brazil
European	Roman Zhdanov (IPC)	0:40.99	2021-09-03	Tokyo	Japan
Oceania	Cameron Leslie (NZL)	0:42.13	2019-09-12	London	United Kingdom

==== Heats ====
Eleven swimmers took part, with the top eight progressing to the final

Rank	Heat	Lane	Athlete	Class	Result	Notes
1	2	4	Roman Zhdanov (AIN)	S4	42.42	Q
2	2	5	Cameron Leslie (NZL)	S4	43.50	Q
3	1	5	Arnost Petracek (CZE)	S4	44.43	Q
4	1	4	Ángel Camacho Ramirez (MEX)	S4	45.40	Q
5	2	3	Matz Topkin (EST)	S4	46.28	Q
6	1	6	Andreas Ernhofer (AUT)	S4	46.63	Q
7	1	3	Dimitri Granjux (FRA)	S4	46.90	Q
8	2	6	Dmytro Vynohradets (UKR)	S4	50.39	Q
9	2	2	Miguel Luque (ESP)	S4	50.76	
10	1	1	Ariel Malyar (ISR)	S4	52.42	
11	2	7	Nattawut Kongsripilarom (THA)	S4	1:10.87	

==== Final ====
Rank	Lane	Athlete	Class	Result	Notes
1st place, gold medalist(s)	4	Roman Zhdanov (AIN)	S4	41.47	
2nd place, silver medalist(s)	5	Cameron Leslie (NZL)	S4	42.54	
3rd place, bronze medalist(s)	3	Arnost Petracek (CZE)	S4	44.13	
4	6	Ángel Camacho Ramirez (MEX)	S4	44.25	
5	2	Matz Topkin (EST)	S4	44.95	
6	7	Andreas Ernhofer (AUT)	S4	46.48	
7	1	Dimitri Granjux (FRA)	S4	46.63	
8	8	Dmytro Vynohradets (UKR)	S4	49.51	

=== S5 ===
The men's 50 metre backstroke S5 event will be held on 22 September.

The relevant records at the beginning of the event were as follows:

Record	Athlete	Time	Date	City	Country
World	Zheng Tao (CHN)	0:31.42	2021-08-30	Tokyo	Japan
Championship	Wang Lichao (CHN)	0:32.59	2019-09-14	London	United Kingdom
African	Zeyad Kahil (EGY)	0:48.97	2023-03-17	Sheffield	United Kingdom
Americas	Samuel de Oliveira (BRA)	0:33.42	2025-06-12	São Paulo	Brazil
Asian	Zheng Tao (CHN)	0:31.42	2021-08-30	Tokyo	Japan
European	Yaroslav Semenenko (UKR)	0:34.58	2023-08-01	Manchester	United Kingdom
Oceania	Cameron Leslie (NZL)	0:41.30	2016-09-16	Rio de Janeiro	Brazil

==== Heats ====
Fifteen swimmers will take part, with the top eight progressing to the final

Rank	Heat	Lane	Athlete	Class	Result	Notes
1	2	5	Samuel de Oliveira (BRA)	S5	33.87	Q
2	2	4	Yuan Weiyi (CHN)	S5	34.30	Q
3	1	4	Guo Jincheng (CHN)	S5	34.37	Q
4	1	5	Yaroslav Semenenko (UKR)	S5	34.82	Q
5	1	3	Eigo Tanaka (JPN)	S5	36.10	Q
6	1	3	Artem Oliinyk (UKR)	S5	37.41	Q
7	1	2	Ismail Zulfic (BIH)	S5	38.13	Q
8	2	2	Kirill Pulver (AIN)	S5	39.27	Q
9	1	6	Antoni Ponce Bertran (ESP)	S5	39.45	
10	2	6	Kaede Hinata (JPN)	S5	39.54	
11	1	7	Francesco Bocciardo (ITA)	S5	41.06	
12	2	7	Abdul Quadir Indori (IND)	S5	42.03	
13	2	1	Oleksandr Komarov (UKR)	S5	42.24	
14	1	1	Luis Huerta Poza (ESP)	S5	43.62	
15	2	8	Hussain Alrashid (KSA)	S5	49.77	

==== Final ====
Rank	Lane	Athlete	Class	Result	Notes
1st place, gold medalist(s)	5	Yuan Weiyi (CHN)	S5	32.59	=CR
2nd place, silver medalist(s)	3	Guo Jincheng (CHN)	S5	33.36	
3rd place, bronze medalist(s)	4	Samuel de Oliveira (BRA)	S5	33.60	
4	6	Yaroslav Semenenko (UKR)	S5	35.35	
5	2	Eigo Tanaka (JPN)	S5	35.7	
6	7	Artem Oliinyk (UKR)	S5	36.58	
7	8	Kirill Pulver (AIN)	S5	38.58	
8	1	Ismail Zulfic (BIH)	S5	39.36	
