= 2023 World Para Swimming Championships – Men's 50 metre backstroke =

The men's 50m backstroke events at the 2023 World Para Swimming Championships were held at the Manchester Aquatics Centre between 31 July and 6 August.

42 swimmers swam across five classifications: S1, S2, S3, S4 and S5.

== Medalists ==
Event	Gold	Silver	Bronze
S1	Kamil Otowski; Poland	Iyad Shalabi; Israel	Francesco Bettella; Italy
S2	Gabriel Araújo; Brazil	Jacek Czech; Poland	Roman Bondarenko; Ukraine
S3	Denys Ostapchenko; Ukraine	Daniel Ferrer Robles; Spain	Vincenzo Boni; Italy
S4	Cameron Leslie; New Zealand	Ángel Camacho; Mexico	Arnošt Petráček; Czech Republic
S5	Yuan Weiyi; China	Wang Lichao; China	Guo Jincheng; China

== Results ==
=== S1 ===
The applicable records entering the event were as follows:

Record	Swimmer	Time
World record	Hennadii Boiko (Ukraine)	59.96
Championship record	Kamil Otowski (Poland)	1:06.46

Final

The event took place on 5 Aug 2023 at 18:22 as a direct final. Five swimmers were entered, representing five nations.

Rank	Lane	Name	Nation	Result	Notes
1st place, gold medalist(s)	4	Kamil Otowski	Poland	1:07.34	
2nd place, silver medalist(s)	5	Iyad Shalabi	Israel	1:10.57	
3rd place, bronze medalist(s)	6	Francesco Bettella	Italy	1:12.87	
4	3	Anton Kol	Ukraine	1:12.97	
5	2	Nikolaos Kontou	Greece	1:51.36	

=== S2 ===
The applicable records entering the event were as follows:

Record	Swimmer	Time
World record	Liankang Zou (China)	47.17
Championship record	Liankang Zou (China)	48.62

Heats

The event took place on Aug 5 2023 at 9:57 a.m. Nine swimmers entered the event. the top eight, regardless of heat or placing, progressed to the final.

Rank	Lane	Name	Nation	Result	Notes
1	4	Gabriel Araújo	Brazil	55.34	Q
2	4	Jacek Czech	Poland	57.62	Q
3	5	Roman Bondarenko	Ukraine	59.22	Q
4	5	Alberto Abarza	Chile	1:00.90	Q
5	3	C Tronco Sanchez	Mexico	1:09.11	Q
6	6	Rodrigo Santillan	Peru	1:10.00	Q
7	3	Jesus Rey Lopez	Mexico	1:10.72	Q
8	6	Conrad Hildebrand	Sweden	1:17.11	Q
9	2	Bruno Becker Da Silva	Brazil	1:41.60	

Final

The event took place on 5 Aug 2023 at 18:16.

Rank	Lane	Name	Nation	Result	Notes
1st place, gold medalist(s)	4	Gabriel Araújo	Brazil	54.08	
2nd place, silver medalist(s)	5	Jacek Czech	Poland	57.44	
3rd place, bronze medalist(s)	3	Roman Bondarenko	Ukraine	1:03.55	
4	6	Alberto Abarza	Chile	1:04.54	
5	2	C Tronco Sanchez	Mexico	1:04.88	
6	7	Rodrigo Santillan	Peru	1:09.06	
7	1	Jesus Rey Lopez	Mexico	1:10.03	
8	8	Conrad Hildebrand	Sweden	1:18.91	

=== S3 ===
The applicable records entering the event were as follows:

Record	Swimmer	Time
World record	Byeong-Eon Min (South Korea)	42.21
Championship record	Diego Lopez Diaz (Mexico)	43.47

Heats

The event took place on 3 Aug 2023 at 9:33 a.m.

Ten swimmers entered the event. The top eight, regardless of heat or placing, progressed to the final.

Rank	Heat	Lane	Name	Nation	Result	Notes
1	1	4	Denys Ostapchenko	Ukraine	46.12	Q
2	2	4	Diego López Diaz	Mexico	48.98	Q
3	1	3	Serhii Palamarchuk	Ukraine	49.15	Q
3	2	5	Vincenzo Boni	Italy	49.15	Q
5	2	6	Umut Unlu	Turkey	50.09	Q
6	1	5	Daniel Ferrer Robles	Spain	51.83	Q
7	1	6	Ahmed Kelly	Australia	55.91	Q
8	2	2	M Zarate Rodriguez	Mexico	57.80	Q
9	1	2	P Larenas Albayay	Chile	59.33	
	2	7	Charkorn Kaewsri	Thailand	DSQ	

Final

The event took place on 3 Aug 2023 at 18:47.

Rank	Lane	Name	Nation	Result	Notes
1st place, gold medalist(s)	4	Denys Ostapchenko	Ukraine	45.95	
2nd place, silver medalist(s)	7	Daniel Ferrer Robles	Spain	48.70	
3rd place, bronze medalist(s)	6	Vincenzo Boni	Italy	48.95	
4	5	Diego López Diaz	Mexico	49.4	
5	3	Serhii Palamarchuk	Ukraine	50.03	
6	2	Umut Unlu	Turkey	50.36	
7	1	Ahmed Kelly	Australia	55.92	
8	8	M Zarate Rodriguez	Mexico	57.60	

=== S4 ===
The applicable records entering the event were as follows:

Record	Swimmer	Time
World record	Roman Zhdanov (Russia)	40.99
Championship record	Roman Zhdanov (Russia)	41.50

Heats.

The event took place on 3 Aug 2023 at 9:51. Nine swimmers entered the competition. The top eight, regardless of heat or placing, progressed to the final.

Rank	Heat	Lane	Name	Nation	Result	Notes
1	1	4	Cameron Leslie	New Zealand	43.44	Q
2	2	4	Arnost Petracek	Czech Republic	43.83	Q
3	2	5	Ángel Camacho	Mexico	44.14	Q
4	1	5	Matz Topkin	Estonia	44.54	Q
5	2	6	Andreas Ernhofer	Austria	47.10	Q
6	1	3	Dmytro Vynohradets'	Ukraine	47.19	Q
7	2	3	Hernande Hernandez	Mexico	47.28	Q
8	1	6	Nicolas Carlos Ricci	Argentina	51.56	Q
9	2	2	Ariel Malyar	Israel	51.57	

Final

The event took place on 3 Aug 2023 at 18:57.

Rank	Lane	Athlete	Nation	Result	Notes
1	4	Cameron Leslie	New Zealand	42.67	
2	3	Ángel Camacho	Mexico	43.17	
3	5	Arnost Petracek	Czech Republic	43.54	
4	6	Matz Topkin	Estonia	44.6	
5	1	Hernande Hernandez	Mexico	47.72	
6	2	Andreas Ernhofer	Austria	48.64	
7	7	Dmytro Vynohradets'	Ukraine	50.53	
8	8	Nicolas Carlos Ricci	Argentina	51.01	

=== S5 ===
Heats

Rank	Heat	Lane	Name	Nation	Result	Notes
1	2	4	Yuan Weiyi	China	33.49	Q
2	1	4	Guo Jincheng	China	33.73	Q
3	1	5	Yaroslav Semenenko	Ukraine	34.58	Q
4	2	5	Wang Lichao	China	35.01	Q
5	2	3	Samuel da Silva de Oliveira	Brazil	35.65	Q
6	2	6	Kaede Hinata	Japan	38.61	Q
7	1	3	Eigo Tanaka	Japan	39.54	Q
8	2	2	Siyazbek Daliyev	Kazakhstan	41.19	Q
9	1	6	Eakapan Songwichean	Thailand	42.77	

Final

Rank	Name	Nation	Result	Notes
1st place, gold medalist(s)	Yuan Weiyi	China	32.73	
2nd place, silver medalist(s)	Wang Lichao	China	32.72	
3rd place, bronze medalist(s)	Guo Jincheng	China	33.72	
4	Samuel da Silva	Brazil	35.02	
5	Yaroslav Semenenko	Ukraine	35.05	
6	Kaede Hinata	Japan	38.31	
7	Eigo Tanaka	Japan	39.38	
8	Siyazbek Daliyev	Kazakhstan	41.30	
