= Swimming at the 2024 Summer Paralympics – Men's 50 metre freestyle S5 =

Men's 50 metre freestyle S5 at the XVII Paralympic Games
- Venue: Paris La Défense Arena
- Dates: 5 September 2024
- Competitors: 13 from 10 nations
- Winning time: 29.33 WR

Medalists
1st place, gold medalist(s)		Guo Jincheng	China
2nd place, silver medalist(s)		Yuan Weiyi	China
3rd place, bronze medalist(s)		Wang Lichao	China

The men's 50 metre freestyle S4 event at the 2024 Paralympic Games took place on 6 September 2024, at the Paris La Défense Arena.

== Heats ==
The swimmers with the top eight times, regardless of heat, advanced to the final.

Rank	Heat	Lane	Name	Nationality	Time	Notes
1	2	4	Guo Jincheng	China	29.97	Q, PR
2	1	5	Yuan Weiyi	China	32.69	Q
3	1	4	Wang Lichao	China	32.78	Q
4	2	3	Oleksandr Komarov	Ukraine	33.21	Q
5	2	5	Samuel de Oliveira	Brazil	33.59	Q
6	1	3	Kirill Pulver	Neutral Paralympic Athletes	33.64	Q
7	1	6	Francesco Bocciardo	Italy	34.15	Q
8	2	6	Muhammad Nur Syaiful Zulkafli	Malaysia	34.51	Q
9	1	2	Abbas Karimi	United States	34.85	
10	2	7	Kaede Hinata	Japan	35.47	
11	2	2	Iaroslav Semenenko	Ukraine	36.21	
12	1	7	Alexandros-Stylianos Lergios	Greece	38.00	
13	2	1	Marcos Miguel Jimenez Sencion	Dominican Republic	38.28	

== Final ==
Rank	Lane	Name	Nationality	Time	Notes
1st place, gold medalist(s)	4	Guo Jincheng	China	29.33	WR
2nd place, silver medalist(s)	5	Yuan Weiyi	China	30.80	
3rd place, bronze medalist(s)	3	Wang Lichao	China	31.23	
4	6	Oleksandr Komarov	Ukraine	31.79	
5	2	Samuel de Oliveira	Brazil	32.57	
6	7	Kirill Pulver	Neutral Paralympic Athletes	32.96	
7	8	Muhammad Nur Syaiful Zulkafli	Malaysia	34.34	
8	1	Francesco Bocciardo	Italy	34.38	
