= José Ronaldo da Silva =

Brazilian para swimmer (born 1980)

Personal information
- Nationality: Brazilian
- Born: 9 September 1980 (age 45)

Sport
- Sport: Para swimming
- Disability class: S1
Medal record
Men's para swimming
Representing Brazil
World Championships
Silver medal – second place	2025 Singapore	50 m backstroke S1

José Ronaldo da Silva (born 9 September 1980) is a Brazilian para swimmer. He represented Brazil at the 2020 and 2024 Summer Paralympics.

== Career ==
Ronaldo represented Brazil at the 2020 and 2024 Summer Paralympics. He competed at the 2025 World Para Swimming Championships and won a silver medal in the 50 metre backstroke S1 event.
