= Jacek Czech =

Polish Paralympic swimmer

Personal information
- Born: 29 February 1976 (age 50) Tarnobrzeg, Poland

Sport
- Country: Poland
- Sport: Paralympic swimming
- Disability: Spinal cord injury
- Disability class: S2
- Events: Freestyle swimming Backstroke
Medal record
Paralympic swimming
Representing Poland
World Championships
Silver medal – second place	2010 Eindhoven	50m freestyle S2
Silver medal – second place	2010 Eindhoven	100m freestyle S2
Silver medal – second place	2010 Eindhoven	50m backstroke S2
Silver medal – second place	2019 London	50m backstroke S2
Silver medal – second place	2022 Madeira	50 m backstroke S2
Silver medal – second place	2023 Manchester	200 m freestyle S2
Silver medal – second place	2023 Manchester	50 m backstroke S2
Bronze medal – third place	2013 Montreal	100m freestyle S2
Bronze medal – third place	2015 Glasgow	100m backstroke S2
Bronze medal – third place	2022 Madeira	100 m backstroke S2
Bronze medal – third place	2025 Singapore	50 m backstroke S2
Bronze medal – third place	2025 Singapore	100 m backstroke S2
European Championships
Gold medal – first place	2018 Dublin	100m backstroke S2
Silver medal – second place	2016 Funchal	50m backstroke S2
Silver medal – second place	2018 Dublin	50m backstroke S2
Silver medal – second place	2026 Kocaeli	200m freestyle S2
Bronze medal – third place	2014 Eindhoven	50m freestyle S2
Bronze medal – third place	2018 Dublin	200m freestyle S2
Bronze medal – third place	2020 Funchal	50m backstroke S2
Bronze medal – third place	2020 Funchal	100m backstroke S2

Jacek Czech (born 29 February 1976) is a Polish Paralympic swimmer who competes in backstroke and freestyle swimming events at international elite events.

== Career ==
He is an eight-time World medalist and a European champion, he has competed at the 2012 and 2016 Summer Paralympics but did not medal in his events. Czech sustained a spinal cord injury after diving headfirst into a lake, he was paralysed in all four limbs however he gained some mobility in his arms through rehabilitation.
