= Rahimi =

Rahimi (Persian: رحیمی) is an Iranian surname. Notable people with the surname include:

- Abouzar Rahimi, Iranian footballer
- Alireza Rahimi (footballer), Iranian football administrator and former footballer
- Amin Hossein Rahimi, Iranian politician
- Atiq Rahimi, French-Afghan writer
- Daniel Rahimi, Swedish-Iranian professional ice hockey defenceman
- Hassan Rahimi, Iranian wrestler
- Leila Rahimi, American sportscaster
- Medalion Rahimi, American actress.
- Mehdi Rahimi, Iranian general executed upon the Islamic revolution in 1979.
- Mohammad-Reza Rahimi, Iranian former Vice President
- Omid Rahimi, American anatomist
- Ramin Rahimi, Iranian songwriter
- Soufiane Rahimi, Moroccan footballer
- Zahra Rahimi, Iranian para taekwondo practitioner

Rahimi may also refer to:

- Rahīmī, a Mughal ship
- United States v. Rahimi (2024), a United States Supreme Court case about the Second Amendment
