= Yuan Weiyi =

Chinese Paralympic swimmer

Personal information
- Nationality: Chinese
- Born: 5 August 2000 (age 25) Cixi, Zhejiang, China

Sport
- Sport: Swimming
Medal record
Men's Paralympic swimming
Representing China
Paralympic Games
Gold medal – first place	2020 Tokyo	Mixed 4×50 m freestyle relay 20pts
Gold medal – first place	2024 Paris	50 m backstroke S5
Gold medal – first place	2024 Paris	Mixed 4x50 m freestyle relay 20 pts
Silver medal – second place	2020 Tokyo	50 m freestyle S5
Silver medal – second place	2024 Paris	50 m freestyle S5
Silver medal – second place	2024 Paris	50 m butterfly S5
Bronze medal – third place	2020 Tokyo	50 m butterfly S5
World Championships
Gold medal – first place	2023 Manchester	50 m backstroke S5
Gold medal – first place	2025 Singapore	50 m backstroke S5
Silver medal – second place	2023 Manchester	50 m freestyle S5
Silver medal – second place	2025 Singapore	Mixed 4×50 m medley relay 20pts
Bronze medal – third place	2023 Manchester	50 m butterfly S5
Bronze medal – third place	2025 Singapore	50 m butterfly S5
Asian Para Games
Gold medal – first place	2022 Hangzhou	50 m backstroke S5
Bronze medal – third place	2022 Hangzhou	50 m freestyle S5

Yuan Weiyi (born 5 August 2000) is a Chinese para-swimmer.

== Career ==
Yuan competed in his first Paralympic games at the 2020 Tokyo Paralympics, where he won the gold medal in the mixed 4 × 50 metre freestyle relay 20pts and the bronze medal at the men's 50 metre butterfly S5.
