= Guo Jincheng =

Chinese Paralympic swimmer

Personal information
- Born: 11 February 2001 (age 25) Cangzhou, China

Sport
- Sport: Para swimming
- Disability: No arms
- Disability class: S5, SM5
Medal record
Men's para swimming
Representing China
Event	1st	2nd	3rd
Paralympic Games	4	2	0
World Championships	7	3	1
Asian Para Games	3	3	0
Total	14	8	1
Paralympic Games
Gold medal – first place	2024 Paris	50 m freestyle S5
Gold medal – first place	2024 Paris	50 m butterfly S5
Gold medal – first place	2024 Paris	Mixed 4x50 m freestyle relay 20 pts
Gold medal – first place	2024 Paris	Mixed 4×50 m medley relay 20pts
Silver medal – second place	2024 Paris	100 m freestyle S5
Silver medal – second place	2024 Paris	50 m backstroke S5
World Championships
Gold medal – first place	2023 Manchester	50 m freestyle S5
Gold medal – first place	2023 Manchester	200 m ind. medley SM5
Gold medal – first place	2023 Manchester	Mixed 4x50 m medley relay 20pts
Gold medal – first place	2023 Manchester	Mixed 4x50 m freestyle relay 20pts
Gold medal – first place	2025 Singapore	50 m freestyle S5
Gold medal – first place	2025 Singapore	50 m butterfly S5
Gold medal – first place	2025 Singapore	200 m ind. medley SM5
Silver medal – second place	2023 Manchester	50 m butterfly S5
Silver medal – second place	2025 Singapore	50 m backstroke S5
Silver medal – second place	2025 Singapore	Mixed 4×50 m medley relay 20pts
Bronze medal – third place	2023 Manchester	50 m backstroke S5
Asian Para Games
Gold medal – first place	2022 Hangzhou	50 m freestyle S5
Gold medal – first place	2022 Hangzhou	200 m freestyle S5
Gold medal – first place	2022 Hangzhou	4×50 m medley relay (20 pts)
Silver medal – second place	2022 Hangzhou	50 m backstroke S5
Silver medal – second place	2022 Hangzhou	100 m breaststroke SB6
Silver medal – second place	2022 Hangzhou	50 m butterfly S5

Guo Jincheng (Chinese: 郭金城; pinyin: Guō Jīnchéng; born 11 February 2001) is a Chinese para swimmer. He represented China at the 2024 Summer Paralympics.

== Career ==
Guo represented China at the 2023 World Para Swimming Championships and won six medals, including gold medals in the 50 metre freestyle, 200 metre individual medley, mixed 4 x 50m medley relay (20 points) and mixed 4 x 50m freestyle relay (20 points) events.

He represented China at the 2024 Summer Paralympics and won four gold medals, and two silver medals.
