= Samuel de Oliveira =

Brazilian Paralympic swimmer (born 2005)

Personal information
- Full name: Samuel da Silva de Oliveira
- Born: 28 August 2005 (age 20)

Sport
- Sport: Para swimming
- Disability class: S5
Medal record
Men's para swimming
Representing Brazil
Paralympic Games
Bronze medal – third place	2024 Paris	Mixed 4×50 m freestyle relay 20 pts
World Championships
Gold medal – first place	2025 Singapore	Mixed 4×50 m medley relay 20pts
Silver medal – second place	2025 Singapore	Mixed 4×50 m freestyle relay 20pts
Silver medal – second place	2025 Singapore	50 m butterfly S5
Bronze medal – third place	2025 Singapore	50 m freestyle S5
Bronze medal – third place	2025 Singapore	50 m backstroke S5
Parapan American Games
Gold medal – first place	2023 Santiago	50m freestyle S5
Gold medal – first place	2023 Santiago	100m freestyle S5
Gold medal – first place	2023 Santiago	200m freestyle S5
Gold medal – first place	2023 Santiago	50m backstroke S5
Gold medal – first place	2023 Santiago	50m butterfly S5
Gold medal – first place	2023 Santiago	4x50m freestyle relay 20pts
Gold medal – first place	2023 Santiago	4x50m medley relay 20pts

Samuel da Silva de Oliveira (born 28 August 2005) is a Brazilian Paralympic swimmer. He represented Brazil at the 2024 Summer Paralympics.

== Career ==
Oliveira represented Brazil at the 2024 Summer Paralympics and won a bronze medal in the mixed 4x50 metre freestyle relay event.

== Personal life ==
His arms were amputated at the shoulder at the age of 9 after he suffered an electrical injury while trying to retrieve a kite from a tree.
