= Wang Lichao =

Chinese Paralympic swimmer

Personal information
- Born: November 3, 1993 (age 32)

Sport
- Country: China
- Sport: Para swimming
Medal record
Representing China
Summer Paralympics
Gold medal – first place	2024 Paris	Mixed 4×50 m freestyle relay 20 pts
Gold medal – first place	2024 Paris	Mixed 4×50 m medley relay 20pts
Silver medal – second place	2020 Tokyo	100 m freestyle S5
Silver medal – second place	2020 Tokyo	50 m butterfly S5
Bronze medal – third place	2016 Rio de Janeiro	50 m butterfly S6
Bronze medal – third place	2020 Tokyo	50 m freestyle S5
Bronze medal – third place	2020 Tokyo	50 m backstroke S5
Bronze medal – third place	2024 Paris	50 m freestyle S5
Bronze medal – third place	2024 Paris	50 m backstroke S5
Bronze medal – third place	2024 Paris	50 m butterfly S5
World Championships
Gold medal – first place	2019 London	50 m backstroke S5
Gold medal – first place	2019 London	50 m butterfly S5
Gold medal – first place	2019 London	Mixed 4x50m freestyle relay 20pts
Gold medal – first place	2019 London	Mixed 4x50m medley relay 20pts
Silver medal – second place	2023 Manchester	50 m backstroke S5
Bronze medal – third place	2023 Manchester	100 m freestyle S5
Bronze medal – third place	2023 Manchester	200 m medley SM5
Asian Para Games
Silver medal – second place	2022 Hangzhou	50 m freestyle S5
Silver medal – second place	2022 Hangzhou	200 m freestyle S5
Bronze medal – third place	2022 Hangzhou	50 m backstroke S5

Wang Lichao (Chinese: 王李超, born 3 November 1993) is a Chinese Paralympic swimmer.

== Career ==
He represented China at the 2016 Summer Paralympics held in Rio de Janeiro, Brazil and he won the bronze medal in the men's 50 metre butterfly S6 event. In 2019, he competed at the World Para Swimming Championships held in London, United Kingdom.
