= Russian Paralympic Committee athletes at the 2020 Summer Paralympics =

RPC at the 2020 Summer Paralympics
- IOC code: RPC
- NOC: Russian Paralympic Committee
- Website: www.paralymp.ru (in Russian)

in Tokyo, Japan
- Flag bearers (opening): Andrei Vdovin; Elena Pautova
- Flag bearer (closing): Roman Zhdanov
- Medals Ranked 4th: Gold 36 Silver 33 Bronze 49 Total 118

Summer Paralympics appearances (overview)
- 1992; 1996; 2000; 2004–2012; 2016; 2020; 2024

Other related appearances
- Soviet Union (1988); Unified Team (1992); Russia (1994–2014)

Russian athletes competed in the 2020 Summer Paralympics under the acronym of the Russian Paralympic Committee (RPC), using a flag depicting a one-off emblem representing the committee.

On 9 December 2019, the World Anti-Doping Agency (WADA) had banned Russia from all international sport for a period of four years, after the Russian government was found to have tampered with lab data that it provided to WADA in January 2019 as a condition of the Russian Anti-Doping Agency being reinstated. This penalty was later reduced to two years, and Russian athletes were permitted to compete as long as they used a non-national flag and delegation name. On 26 April 2021, it was confirmed that Russian athletes would compete under the name "RPC" as long as the full name of the organization was not used, and that the delegation would use a specially created emblem representing the Russian Paralympic Committee (as the actual emblem of the committee features the Russian national flag). This was slated to apply to both the 2020 Summer Paralympics and the 2022 Winter Paralympics; however, the team was ultimately banned from the latter due to the Russian invasion of Ukraine in late February 2022.

== Medalists ==
Medal	Name	Sport	Event	Date
Gold	Valeriia Shabalina	Swimming	Women's 100 metre butterfly S14	25 August
Gold	Roman Zhdanov	Swimming	Men's 50 metre breaststroke SB3	25 August
Gold	Anastasiia Gontar	Swimming	Women's 50 metre freestyle S10	25 August
Gold	Mikhail Astashov	Cycling	Men's individual pursuit C1	26 August
Gold	Andrei Kalina	Swimming	Men's 100 metre breaststroke SB8	26 August
Gold	Alexander Kuzyukov	Wheelchair fencing	Men's épée B	26 August
Gold	Valeriia Shabalina	Swimming	Women's 200 metre freestyle S14	27 August
Gold	Alexander Kuzyukov; Maxim Shaburov; Artur Yusupov	Wheelchair fencing	Men's épée team	27 August
Gold	Albert Khinchagov	Athletics	Men's shot put F37	27 August
Gold	Aleksandr Iaremchuk	Athletics	Men's 1500 metres T46	28 August
Gold	Elena Prokofeva	Table tennis	Women's individual class 11	28 August
Gold	Roman Zhdanov	Swimming	Men's 150 metre individual medley SM4	28 August
Gold	Andrei Granichka	Swimming	Men's 100 metre breaststroke SB5	28 August
Gold	Denis Gnezdilov	Athletics	Men's shot put F40	29 August
Gold	Dmitrii Cherniaev	Swimming	Men's 100 metre breaststroke SB4	29 August
Gold	Bogdan Mozgovoi	Swimming	Men's 100 metre backstroke S9	30 August
Gold	Dmitrii Safronov	Athletics	Men's 100 metres T35	30 August
Gold	Anton Prokhorov	Athletics	Men's 100 metres T63	30 August
Gold	Evgenii Torsunov	Athletics	Men's long jump T36	30 August
Gold	Mikhail Astashov	Cycling	Men's road time trial C1	31 August
Gold	Anton Kuliatin	Athletics	Men's 1500 metres T13	31 August
Gold	Vladimir Sviridov	Athletics	Men's shot put F36	31 August
Gold	Andrei Nikolaev	Swimming	Men's 400 metre freestyle S8	31 August
Gold	Valeriia Shabalina	Swimming	Women's 200 metre individual medley SM14	31 August
Gold	Ilnur Garipov; Anna Krivshina; Daria Pikalova; Vladimir Sotnikov	Swimming	Mixed 4 x 100 metre freestyle relay 49pts	31 August
Gold	Andrei Vdovin	Athletics	Men's 400 metres T37	1 September
Gold	Mariia Pavlova	Swimming	Women's 100 metre breaststroke SB7	1 September
Gold	Ruslan Kuznetsov	Cycling	Men's road race H3	1 September
Gold	Andrei Kalina	Swimming	Men's 200 metre individual SM9	1 September
Gold	Viktoriia Ishchiulova	Swimming	Women's 50 metre freestyle S8	1 September
Gold	Galina Lipatnikova	Athletics	Women's shot put F36	1 September
Gold	Musa Taimazov	Athletics	Men's club throw F51	1 September
Gold	Roman Zhdanov	Swimming	Men's 50 metre backstroke S4	3 September
Gold	Andrei Gladkov; Dmitry Grigoryev; Andrei Kalina; Bogdan Mozgovoi; Andrei Nikolaev; Alexander Skaliukh; Daniil Smirnov; Denis Tarasov	Swimming	Men's 4 x 100 m medley relay	3 September
Gold	Dmitrii Safronov	Athletics	Men's 200 metres T35	4 September
Gold	Margarita Sidorenko; Kirill Smirnov	Archery	Mixed team recurve open	4 September
Silver	Andrei Nikolaev	Swimming	Men's 100 metre freestyle S8	25 August
Silver	Andrei Granichka	Swimming	Men's 200 metre individual medley SM6	26 August
Silver	Artem Isaev	Swimming	Men's 100 metre breaststroke SB9	26 August
Silver	Maxim Shaburov	Wheelchair fencing	Men's épée A	26 August
Silver	Viktoria Boykova	Wheelchair fencing	Women's épée B	26 August
Silver	Daria Pikalova	Swimming	Women's 100 metre backstroke S12	27 August
Silver	Andrei Vdovin	Athletics	Men's 100 metres T37	27 August
Silver	Denis Tarasov	Swimming	Men's 50 metre freestyle S9	29 August
Silver	Anna Krivshina	Swimming	Men's 50 metre freestyle S13	29 August
Silver	Maliak Alieva	Table tennis	Women's individual class 6	30 August
Silver	Viktoriia Safonova	Table tennis	Women's individual class 7	30 August
Silver	Evgenii Shvetsov	Athletics	Men's 400 metres T36	31 August
Silver	Daria Pikalova	Swimming	Women's 100 metre freestyle S12	31 August
Silver	Nataliia Butkova	Swimming	Women's 50 metre breaststroke SB3	31 August
Silver	Margarita Goncharova	Athletics	Women's long jump T38	31 August
Silver	Aleksei Churkin	Athletics	Men's shot put F32	31 August
Silver	Nikita Prokhorov	Athletics	Men's shot put F46	1 September
Silver	Egor Efrosinin	Swimming	Men's 100 metre breaststroke SB7	1 September
Silver	Elena Ivanova	Athletics	Women's 100 metres T36	1 September
Silver	Daria Lukianenko	Swimming	Women's 100 metre breaststroke SB12	1 September
Silver	Viacheslav Emeliantsev	Swimming	Men's 100 metre backstroke S14	2 September
Silver	Valeriia Shabalina	Swimming	Women's 100 metre backstroke S14	2 September
Silver	Anastasiia Gontar; Viktoriia Ishchiulova; Ani Palian; Elizaveta Sidorenko	Swimming	Women's 4 x 100 metre medley relay	2 September
Silver	Alexandr Rabotnitskii	Athletics	Men's 1500 metres T20	3 September
Silver	Aleksandra Moguchaia	Athletics	Women's long jump T47	3 September
Silver	Alexey Kuznetsov	Athletics	Men's javelin throw F54	3 September
Silver	Leonid Krylov	Paracanoeing	Men's KL3	3 September
Silver	Viktoriia Ishchiulova	Swimming	Women's 100 metre butterfly S8	3 September
Silver	Aleksandra Ruchkina	Athletics	Women's long jump T20	3 September
Silver	Andrei Vdovin	Athletics	Men's 200 metres T37	4 September
Silver	Margarita Goncharova	Athletics	Women's 400 metres T38	4 September
Silver	RPC men's national sitting volleyball team: Aleksandr Baichik; Anatolii Krupin; Andrei Lavrinovich; Viktor Milenin; Vladimir Pankratov; Sergei Pozdeev; Aleksandr Reznichenko; Aleksandr Savichev; Denis Shestakov; Aleksei Volkov; Evgenii Volosnikov; Ilnar Zinnatullin	Sitting volleyball	Men's tournament	4 September
Silver	Elena Pautova	Athletics	Women's marathon T12	5 September
Bronze	Vladimir Danilenko	Swimming	Men's 100 metre backstroke S2	25 August
Bronze	Daria Pikalova	Swimming	Women's 100 metre butterfly S13	25 August
Bronze	Roman Zhdanov	Swimming	Men's 100 metre freestyle S4	26 August
Bronze	Dmitrii Bartasinskii	Swimming	Men's 100 metre breaststroke SB9	26 August
Bronze	Vladimir Sotnikov	Swimming	Men's 100 metre backstroke S13	26 August
Bronze	Adelina Razetdinova	Swimming	Women's 100 metre breaststroke SB8	26 August
Bronze	Viktoriia Potapova	Judo	Women's 48 kg	27 August
Bronze	Alesia Stepaniuk	Judo	Women's 52 kg	27 August
Bronze	Viacheslav Emeliantsev	Swimming	Men's 200 metre freestyle S14	27 August
Bronze	Viktoria Boykova; Alena Evdokimova; Iuliia Maya	Wheelchair fencing	Women's épée team	27 August
Bronze	Aleksandr Kostin	Athletics	Men's 5000 metres T13	28 August
Bronze	Nadezhda Pushpasheva	Table tennis	Women's individual class 1–2	28 August
Bronze	Raisa Chebanika	Table tennis	Women's individual class 6	28 August
Bronze	Iurii Nozdrunov	Table tennis	Men's individual class 9	28 August
Bronze	Nataliia Butkova	Swimming	Women's 150 metre individual medley SM4	28 August
Bronze	Nikita Nagaev	Wheelchair fencing	Men's foil A	28 August
Bronze	Ludmila Vasileva	Wheelchair fencing	Women's foil A	28 August
Bronze	Mariia Pavlova	Swimming	Women's 200 metre individual medley SM8	28 August
Bronze	Elena Krutova; Aleksei Leonov	Archery	Mixed team W1	28 August
Bronze	Anastasiia Soloveva	Athletics	Women's 400 metres T47	28 August
Bronze	Anatoliy Shevchenko	Judo	Men's 100 kg	29 August
Bronze	Vera Muratova	Powerlifting	Women's 79 kg	29 August
Bronze	Iuliia Shishova	Swimming	Women's 50 metre backstroke S3	29 August
Bronze	Vladimir Danilenko	Swimming	Men's 200 metre freestyle S2	29 August
Bronze	Stepanida Artakhinova; Bair Shigaev	Archery	Mixed team compound open	29 August
Bronze	Vitalii Gritsenko	Athletics	Men's 400 metres T53	29 August
Bronze	Anna Sapozhnikova	Athletics	Women's long jump T37	29 August
Bronze	Roman Tarasov	Athletics	Men's 100 metres T12	29 August
Bronze	Roman Zhdanov	Swimming	Men's 200 metre freestyle S4	30 August
Bronze	Artem Kalashian	Athletics	Men's 100 metres T35	30 August
Bronze	Iuliia Shishova	Swimming	Women's 100 metre freestyle S3	30 August
Bronze	Fedor Rudakov	Athletics	Men's 1500 metres T11	31 August
Bronze	Nikita Kotukov	Athletics	Men's long jump T47	31 August
Bronze	Chermen Kobesov	Athletics	Men's 400 metres T37	1 September
Bronze	Maliak Alieva; Raisa Chebanika; Viktoriia Safonova	Table tennis	Women's team – Class 6–8	1 September
Bronze	Artur Saifutdinov	Swimming	Men's 100 metre breaststroke SB12	1 September
Bronze	Evgeniia Galaktionova	Athletics	Women's shot put F32	1 September
Bronze	Viacheslav Lenskii	Swimming	Men's 400 metre freestyle S6	2 September
Bronze	Alexander Skaliukh	Swimming	Men's 100 metre butterfly S9	2 September
Bronze	Vladimir Danilenko	Swimming	Men's 50 metre backstroke S2	2 September
Bronze	Anna Poddubskaia	Taekwondo	Women's 49 kg	2 September
Bronze	Daniil Sidorov	Taekwondo	Men's 61 kg	2 September
Bronze	Roman Makarov	Swimming	Men's 100 metre butterfly S12	3 September
Bronze	Elena Gorlova	Athletics	Women's club throw F51	3 September
Bronze	Artem Kalashian	Athletics	Men's 200 metres T35	4 September
Bronze	Sergey Malyshev	Shooting	Mixed P4 50 metre pistol SH1	4 September
Bronze	Daria Adonina; Ivan Frolov; Sergey Safin	Boccia	Mixed pairs BC4	4 September
Bronze	Anna Kulinich-Sorokina	Athletics	Women's 200 metres T12	4 September
Bronze	Zainutdin Ataev	Taekwondo	Men's +75 kg	4 September

Medals by sport
Sport	1st place, gold medalist(s)	2nd place, silver medalist(s)	3rd place, bronze medalist(s)	Total
Archery	1	0	2	3
Athletics	12	13	13	38
Boccia	0	0	1	1
Cycling	3	0	0	3
Judo	0	0	3	3
Paracanoeing	0	1	0	1
Powerlifting	0	0	1	1
Shooting	0	0	1	1
Sitting volleyball	0	1	0	1
Swimming	17	14	18	49
Table tennis	1	2	4	7
Taekwondo	0	0	3	3
Wheelchair fencing	2	2	3	7
Total	36	33	49	118

== Competitors ==
The following is the list of number of competitors participating in the Games:

Sport	Men	Women	Total
Archery	6	5	11
Athletics	45*	27	72*
Badminton	0	1	1
Boccia	6*	3	9
Cycling	5	3	8
Equestrian	2	2	4
Goalball	0	6	6
Judo	4	5	9
Paracanoeing	4	3	7
Paratriathlon	1	4*	5*
Powerlifting	0	2	2
Rowing	4	2	6
Shooting	3	3	6
Sitting volleyball	12	12	24
Swimming	32	21	53
Table tennis	4	6	10
Taekwondo	3	1	4
Wheelchair fencing	6	6	12
Wheelchair tennis	0	2	2
Total	137	114	251

*Guides in athletics and paratriathlon, competition partners in boccia are counted as athletes at the Paralympics.

== Sanction stipulations ==
On 9 December 2019, the World Anti-Doping Agency (WADA) banned Russia from all international sport for four years, after it was found that data provided by the Russian Anti-Doping Agency had been manipulated by Russian authorities with a goal of protecting athletes involved in its state-sponsored doping scheme. Russian athletes would be allowed to participate in the Paralympic under a neutral flag and with a neutral designation.

Russia later appealed against the WADA decision in the CAS. On 17 December 2020, the CAS announced its decision, reducing the suspension to two years and allowing Russian athletes to participate under the flag of the Russian Paralympic Committee, rather than under a neutral flag, and use the Russian national colours.

For all victory ceremonies, Pyotr Tchaikovsky's Piano Concerto No. 1 will be used in lieu of the Russian national anthem.

== Archery ==
Russian athletes form some of the participating nations.

Men

Athlete	Event	Ranking round		Round of 64	Round of 32	Round of 16	Quarterfinals	Semifinals	Final / BM	
Athlete	Event	Score	Seed	Opposition Score	Opposition Score	Opposition Score	Opposition Score	Opposition Score	Opposition Score	Rank
Nail Gatin	Compound	689	11	Bye	MacQueen (GBR); W 142–138	Ai (CHN); L 145–136	Did not advance			
Bair Shigaev	Compound	693	7	Bye	Julin (MAS); W 136–126	Korkmaz (TUR); W 146–145	Biabani (IRI); L 143–143*	Did not advance		
Kirill Smirnov	Recurve	632	3	—N/a	Rigsel (BHU); W 6–2	Ivan (SVK); W 6–0	Kim (KOR); L 4–6	Did not advance		
Bato Tsydendorzhiev	Recurve	630	5	—N/a	Selvathamby (MAS); W 6–2	Singh (IND); L 5–6	Did not advance			
Anton Ziapaev	Recurve	612	8	—N/a	Aksoy (TUR); L 2–6	Did not advance				
Aleksei Leonov	W1	612	12	—N/a		Hekimoğlu (TUR); L 107–135	Did not advance			

Women

Athlete	Event	Ranking round		Round of 32	Round of 16	Quarterfinals	Semifinals	Final / BM	
Athlete	Event	Score	Seed	Opposition Score	Opposition Score	Opposition Score	Opposition Score	Opposition Score	Rank
Tatiana Andrievskaia	Compound	667	17	Paterson Pine (GBR); L 138–142	Did not advance				
Stepanida Artakhinova	Compound	693	2	Bye	Leonard (IRL); W 141–131	Yorulmaz (TUR); W 139–129	Zúñiga (CHI); L 141–142	Virgilio (ITA); L 139–142	4
Svetlana Barantseva	Recurve	537	19	Daza (COL); W 6–4	Nemati (IRI); L 5–6	Did not advance			
Margarita Sidorenko	Recurve	605	5	Bye	Chaisty (GBR); L 5–6	Did not advance			
Elena Krutova	W1	567	10	—N/a	Musilová (CZE); L 128–128*	Did not advance			

Mixed team

Athlete	Event	Ranking round		Round of 16	Quarterfinals	Semifinals	Final / BM	
Athlete	Event	Score	Seed	Opposition Score	Opposition Score	Opposition Score	Opposition Score	Rank
Stepanida Artakhinova; Bair Shigaev	Compound	1386	2	Bye	Italy; W 153*–153	Turkey; L 155–156	Iran; W 153–151	3rd place, bronze medalist(s)
Margarita Sidorenko; Kirill Smirnov	Recurve	1237	4	United States; W 6–2	South Korea; W 6–2	China; W 5–4	Italy; W 5–4	1st place, gold medalist(s)
Elena Krutova; Aleksei Leonov	W1	1179	5	—N/a	Japan; W 132–119	China; L 128–142	South Korea; W 132–127	3rd place, bronze medalist(s)

== Athletics ==
Track & road events
Men

Athlete	Event	Heats		Final	
Athlete	Event	Result	Rank	Result	Rank
Alexey Bychenok	400 m T54	DQ		Did not advance	
Alexey Bychenok	1500 m T54	DNS		Did not advance	
Alexey Bychenok	5000 m T54	10:10.99	3 Q	10:30.59	5
David Dzhatiev	100 m T35	—N/a		11.82	4
David Dzhatiev	200 m T35	—N/a		23.85	4
Anton Feoktistov	400 m T38	53.57	5 q	52.27	6
Denis Gavrilov; Guide: Sergey Ivanov	Marathon T12	—N/a		2:39:48	10
Vitalii Gritsenko	100 m T53	15.26	6 q	15.55	8
Vitalii Gritsenko	400 m T53	48.74	5 q	49.41	3rd place, bronze medalist(s)
Vitalii Gritsenko	800 m T53	1:42.52	9 Q	1:40.51	6
Vitalii Gritsenko	1500 m T54	2:56.96	8	Did not advance	
Vitalii Gritsenko	Marathon T54	—N/a		1:33:13	13
Aleksandr Iaremchuk	1500 m T46	—N/a		3:52.08	1st place, gold medalist(s)
Aleksandr Iaremchuk	Marathon T46	—N/a		2:31:42	4
Artem Kalashian	100 m T35	—N/a		11.75	3rd place, bronze medalist(s)
Artem Kalashian	200 m T35	—N/a		23.75	3rd place, bronze medalist(s)
Khetag Khinchagov	100 m T38	DQ		Did not advance	
Chermen Kobesov	100 m T37	11.32	2 Q	11.32	4
Chermen Kobesov	200 m T37	23.19	4 Q	22.85	4
Chermen Kobesov	400 m T37	—N/a		50.44	3rd place, bronze medalist(s)
Aleksandr Kostin	1500 m T13	—N/a		3:55.57	4
Aleksandr Kostin; Guide: Iurii Kloptcov	5000 m T13	—N/a		14:37.42	3rd place, bronze medalist(s)
Anton Kuliatin	1500 m T13	—N/a		3:54.04	1st place, gold medalist(s)
Anton Prokhorov	100 m T63	12.15 WR	2 Q	12.04 WR	1st place, gold medalist(s)
Alexandr Rabotnitskii	1500 m T20	—N/a		3:55.78	2nd place, silver medalist(s)
Fedor Rudakov	1500 m T11	4:11.88	3 q	4:05.55	3rd place, bronze medalist(s)
Fedor Rudakov; Guide: Vladimir Miasnikov	5000 m T11	—N/a		DQ	
Dmitry Safronov	100 m T35	—N/a		11.39	1st place, gold medalist(s)
Dmitry Safronov	200 m T35	—N/a		23.00 WR	1st place, gold medalist(s)
Pavel Sarkeev	1500 m T20	—N/a		4:00.43	6
Egor Sharov	400 m T13	49.91	5 Q	50.96	8
Egor Sharov	1500 m T13	—N/a		3:56.36	5
Aleksandr Shirin	400 m T13	49.83	4 Q	49.75	5
Evgenii Shvetcov	100 m T36	12.26	7 Q	12.51	8
Evgenii Shvetcov	400 m T36	—N/a		53.60	2nd place, silver medalist(s)
Roman Tarasov	100 m T12	10.83	3 q	10.88	3rd place, bronze medalist(s)
Evgenii Torsunov	100 m T36	12.51	8 q	12.49	7
Andrey Vdovin	100 m T37	11.34	4 Q	11.18	2nd place, silver medalist(s)
Andrey Vdovin	200 m T37	22.94	2 Q	22.24	2nd place, silver medalist(s)
Andrey Vdovin	400 m T37	—N/a		49.34 WR	1st place, gold medalist(s)

Women

Athlete	Event	Heats		Final	
Athlete	Event	Result	Rank	Result	Rank
Veronika Doronina	100 m T34	—N/a		19.06	4
Veronika Doronina	800 m T34	—N/a		2:19.64	5
Margarita Goncharova	100 m T38	13.20	9	Did not advance	
Margarita Goncharova	400 m T38	1:02.62	6 Q	1:00.14	2nd place, silver medalist(s)
Elena Ivanova	100 m T36	14.46	2 Q	14.60	2nd place, silver medalist(s)
Elena Ivanova	200 m T36	34.19	9	Did not advance	
Anna Kulinich-Sorokina; Guide: Sergey Petrichenko	200 m T12	25.38	4 Q	24.85	3rd place, bronze medalist(s)
Aleksandra Moguchaia	100 m T47	12.64	8 q	12.71	8
Elena Pautova; Guide: Grigoriy Andreyev	1500 m T13	5:33.39	12 q	5:00.76	8
Elena Pautova; Guide: Grigoriy Andreyev	Marathon T12	—N/a		3:04:16	2nd place, silver medalist(s)
Anna Sapozhnikova	100 m T37	14.50	9	Did not advance	
Viktoriia Slanova	100 m T37	13.88	7 Q	14.26	8
Viktoriia Slanova	200 m T37	28.56	7 q	28.84	7
Viktoriia Slanova	400 m T37	—N/a		DQ	
Anastasiia Soloveva	200 m T47	25.50	4 Q	25.60	6
Anastasiia Soloveva	400 m T47	57.27	1 Q	57.59	3rd place, bronze medalist(s)
Elena Tretiakova	200 m T37	29.85	10	Did not advance	
Elena Tretiakova	400 m T37	—N/a		1:07.18	6
Mariia Ulianenko	400 m T13	58.56	9	Did not advance	
Veronika Zotova	1500 m T13	4:52.18	7 Q	4:33.96	4

Mixed

Athlete	Event	Heats		Final	
Athlete	Event	Result	Rank	Result	Rank
Vitalii Gritsenko; Viktoriia Slanova; Anastasiia Soloveva; Roman Tarasov	4 × 100 m relay	48.90	7	Did not advance	

Field events
Men

Athlete	Event	Result	Rank
Igor Baskakov	Shot put F11	12.83	5
Igor Baskakov	Discus throw F11	34.47	4
Sergei Biriukov	Long jump T37	5.96	5
David Budoian	Long jump T38	6.09	8
Aleksei Churkin	Shot put F32	11.31	2nd place, silver medalist(s)
Aleksei Churkin	Club throw F32	34.82	4
Dmitry Dushkin	Shot put F40	10.39	5
Alexander Elmin	Shot put F35	13.78	6
Denis Gnezdilov	Shot put F40	11.16 WR	1st place, gold medalist(s)
Albert Khinchagov	Shot put F37	15.78	1st place, gold medalist(s)
Khetag Khinchagov	Long jump T38	6.53	4
Aleksandr Khrupin	Shot put F33	11.21	4
Chermen Kobesov	Long jump T37	6.00	4
Alan Kokoity	Shot put F36	14.37	5
Nikita Kotukov	Long jump T47	7.34	3rd place, bronze medalist(s)
Alexey Kuznetsov	Javelin throw F54	31.19	2nd place, silver medalist(s)
Georgii Margiev	High jump T47	1.89	6
Nikita Prokhorov	Shot put F46	16.29	2nd place, silver medalist(s)
Sergei Shatalov	Shot put F11	12.59	7
Sergei Shatalov	Discus throw F11	32.08	8
Sergei Sokulskii	Shot put F55	12.06 WR	4
Vladimir Sviridov	Shot put F36	16.67 WR	1st place, gold medalist(s)
Musa Taimazov	Club throw F51	35.42 WR	1st place, gold medalist(s)
Evgenii Torsunov	Long jump T36	5.76 PR	1st place, gold medalist(s)

Women

Athlete	Event	Result	Rank
Olesia Baisarina	Shot put F32	NM	–
Antonina Baranova	Shot put F20	13.26	7
Mariia Bogacheva	Shot put F54	7.34	4
Mariia Bogacheva	Javelin throw F54	15.22	6
Nadezhda Burkova	Shot put F12	13.08	4
Nataliia Chebakova	Discus throw F55	NM	–
Evgeniia Galaktionova	Shot put F32	6.80	3rd place, bronze medalist(s)
Margarita Goncharova	Long jump T38	5.29	2nd place, silver medalist(s)
Elena Gorlova	Discus throw F53	12.79	5
Elena Gorlova	Club throw F51	24.08	3rd place, bronze medalist(s)
Anna Kulinich-Sorokina	Javelin throw F13	37.48	5
Galina Lipatnikova	Shot put F36	11.03	1st place, gold medalist(s)
Aleksandra Moguchaia	Long jump T47	5.67	2nd place, silver medalist(s)
Aleksandra Nedelko	Long jump T38	4.37	4
Elena Orlova	Shot put F34	7.20	6
Irina Potekhina	Long jump T20	4.99	8
Aleksandra Ruchkina	Long jump T20	5.49	2nd place, silver medalist(s)
Anna Sapozhnikova	Long jump T37	4.56	3rd place, bronze medalist(s)
Elena Shakh	Discus throw F11	32.80	5
Irina Vertinskaya	Shot put F37	12.78	4
Aleksandra Zaitseva	Shot put F20	12.13	10

== Badminton ==
Athlete	Event	Group stage			Quarterfinal	Semifinal	Final / BM	
Athlete	Event	Opposition Score	Opposition Score	Rank	Opposition Score	Opposition Score	Opposition Score	Rank
Tatiana Gureeva	Women's singles WH2	Liu (CHN); L (3–21, 5–21)	Jáuregui (PER); W (20–22, 21–11, 21–10)	2 Q	Yamazaki (JPN); L (25–23, 7–21, 8–21)	Did not advance		

== Boccia ==
Russian athletes form some of the participating nations, having qualified through the BISFed 2019 European Championships.

Athlete	Event	Group stage					Quarterfinal	Semifinal	Final / BM	
Athlete	Event	Opposition Score	Opposition Score	Opposition Score	Opposition Score	Rank	Opposition Score	Opposition Score	Opposition Score	Rank
Olga Dolgova	Individual BC1	Gutnik (RPC); W 3–1	Perez (NED); L 5–6	Moraes (BRA); W 4–1	Tipmanee (THA); L 0–6	3	Did not advance			
Mikhail Gutnik	Individual BC1	Dolgova (RPC); L 1–3	Tipmanee (THA); W 11–1	Moraes (BRA); W 4–3	Perez (NED); W 7–4	1 Q	Ramos (POR); L 2–4	Did not advance		
Dmitry Kozmin	Individual BC2	Aquino (ARG); W 3–2	Lan (CHN); W 4–3	Yan (CHN); W 6–0	—N/a	1 Q	Vongsa (THA); L 4–6	Did not advance		
Diana Tsyplina	Individual BC2	Sugimura (JPN); L 0–12	Gonçalves (POR); L 3–8	Allard (CAN); L 1–12	—N/a	4	Did not advance			
Aleksandr Legostaev; Sport assistant: Sergei Legostaev	Individual BC3	Vanderbeken (FRA); W 4–3	Ntenta (GRE); W 8–2	Peška (CZE); L 3–3*	—N/a	2 Q	Polychronidis (GRE); L 1–5	Did not advance		
Sergey Safin	Individual BC4	Leung (HKG); L 1–3	E. dos Santos (BRA); L 3–7	M. dos Santos (BRA); W 11–7	—N/a	3	Did not advance			
Daria Adonina; Ivan Frolov; Sergey Safin	Pairs BC4	Japan; W 7–3	Hong Kong; L 2–8	Thailand; W 5–2	Colombia; W 7–3	2 Q	—N/a	Slovakia; L 2–5	Portugal; W 5–1	3rd place, bronze medalist(s)
Olga Dolgova; Mikhail Gutnik; Dmitry Kozmin; Diana Tsyplina	Team BC1–2	Argentina; W 7*–7	Thailand; L 0–13	China; L 6–6*	Great Britain; W 10–3	3	—N/a	Did not advance		

== Cycling ==
Russian athletes form some of the participating nations, for both men and women.

=== Road ===
Men

Athlete	Event	Time	Rank
Mikhail Astashov	Road race C1–3	2:22:14	20
Mikhail Astashov	Time trial C1	24:53.37	1st place, gold medalist(s)
Arslan Gilmutdinov	Road race C1–3	2:11:10	9
Arslan Gilmutdinov	Time trial C2	37:23.02	5
Ruslan Kuznetsov	Road race H3	2:34:35	1st place, gold medalist(s)
Ruslan Kuznetsov	Time trial H3	43:49.24	4
Sergei Pudov	Road race C4–5	2:27:56	10
Sergei Pudov	Time trial C4	47:33.31	5
Sergei Semochkin	Road race T1–2	1:02:17	9
Sergei Semochkin	Time trial T1–2	31:34.44	7

Women

Athlete	Event	Time	Rank
Svetlana Moshkovich	Road race H1–4	57:47	4
Svetlana Moshkovich	Time trial H4–5	52:47.14	9
Alina Punina	Road race C4–5	2:46:38	11
Alina Punina	Time trial C5	48:27.51	8
Yulia Sibagatova	Road race T1–2	1:40:22	7
Yulia Sibagatova	Time trial T1–2	49:14.25	9

=== Track ===
Men

Athlete	Event	Qualification		Final	
Athlete	Event	Time	Rank	Opposition Time	Rank
Mikhail Astashov	1000 m time trial C1–3	—N/a		1:05.843	4
Mikhail Astashov	3000 m individual pursuit C1	3:35.954 WR	1 Q	Chernove (CAN); W OVL	1st place, gold medalist(s)
Arslan Gilmutdinov	1000 m time trial C1–3	—N/a		1:11.119	11
Arslan Gilmutdinov	3000 m individual pursuit C2	3:39.949	5	Did not advance	
Sergei Pudov	1000 m time trial C4–5	—N/a		1:09.662	16
Sergei Pudov	4000 m individual pursuit C4	4:43.725	5	Did not advance	

Women

Athlete	Event	Qualification		Final	
Athlete	Event	Time	Rank	Opposition Time	Rank
Alina Punina	500 m time trial C4–5	—N/a		38.369	7
Alina Punina	3000 m individual pursuit C5	4:01.898	5	Did not advance	

Mixed

Athlete	Event	Qualification		Final	
Athlete	Event	Time	Rank	Opposition Time	Rank
Mikhail Astashov; Sergei Pudov; Alina Punina	Team sprint C1–5	52.952	8	Did not advance	

== Equestrian ==
Russian athletes form one of the team slots of qualifying nations.

Individual

Athlete	Horse	Event	% Score	Rank
Vladislav Pronskiy	Silva Le Andro	Individual championship test Grade I	70.429	8 Q
Vladislav Pronskiy	Silva Le Andro	Individual freestyle test Grade I	62.640	8
Iuliia Poliakova	Romina Power	Individual championship test Grade II	66.824	8 Q
Iuliia Poliakova	Romina Power	Individual freestyle test Grade II	69.027	7
Vladislav Kolosov	Laurentio II	Individual championship test Grade IV	65.976	14
Vladislav Kolosov	Laurentio II	Individual freestyle test Grade IV	Did not advance	
Natalia Martianova	Quinta	Individual championship test Grade V	71.405	5 Q
Natalia Martianova	Quinta	Individual freestyle test Grade V	72.840	5

Team

Athlete	Horse	Event	Individual score	Total	
Athlete	Horse	Event	Individual score	% Score	Rank
Natalia Martianova	See above	Team	71.256	208.233	11
Iuliia Poliakova	See above	Team	66.727	208.233	11
Vladislav Pronskiy	See above	Team	70.250	208.233	11

== Goalball ==
Summary

Team	Event	Group stage					Quarterfinal	Semifinal	Final / BM	
Team	Event	Opposition Score	Opposition Score	Opposition Score	Opposition Score	Rank	Opposition Score	Opposition Score	Opposition Score	Rank
RPC women's	Women's tournament	Canada; W 5–1	China; W 4–3	Israel; L 3–8	Australia; L 1–4	3 Q	United States; L 3–5	Did not advance		

=== Women's tournament ===
The Russia women's national goalball team secured a Paralympic Games position through first place in the women's category of the 2018 World Championships.

Team roster

The following is the RPC roster in the women's goalball tournament of the 2020 Summer Paralympics.

No.	Player	Class	Date of birth (age)
1	Arina Gerasimova	B3	7 January 1998 (aged 23)
2	Evengiia Semina	B2	16 April 1994 (aged 27)
5	Anastasiia Mazur	B3	28 June 1990 (aged 31)
7	Irina Arestova	B3	14 September 1995 (aged 25)
8	Iuliia Khrapkova	B3	18 June 1996 (aged 25)
9	Anastasiia Chudina	B3	8 January 1994 (aged 27)

Group stage

Pos	Team	Pld	W	D	L	GF	GA	GD	Pts	Qualification
1	China	4	3	0	1	17	7	+10	9	Quarterfinals
2	Israel	4	2	0	2	22	14	+8	6	Quarterfinals
3	RPC	4	2	0	2	13	16	−3	6	Quarterfinals
4	Australia	4	2	0	2	9	21	−12	6	Quarterfinals
5	Canada	4	1	0	3	12	15	−3	3	

Source: TOCOG
Rules for classification: 1) points; 2) goal difference; 3) number of wins; 4) goals against; 5) head-to-head goal difference.
25 August 2021
10:30

RPC	5–1	Canada
Gerasimova 1'; Arestova 2', 9', 16'; Chudina 23'	Report	Reinke 23'

Makuhari Messe, Tokyo
Referee: Vaida Pokvytytė (Lithuania), Yoshinori Nii (Japan)

26 August 2021
10:30

China	3–4	RPC
Cao Zhenhua 3', 10'; Chen Fengqing 24'	Report	Arestova 3', 4', 12'; Gerasimova 3'

Makuhari Messe, Tokyo
Referee: Romualdas Vaitiekus (Lithuania), Launel Scott (Canada)

28 August 2021
17:30

RPC	3–8	Israel
Arestova 9', 20'; Chudina 16'	Report	Mahamid 1', 1'; Mizrahi 2', 3'; Ben-David 16', 19', 24', 24'

Makuhari Messe, Tokyo
Referee: Robert Avery (Great Britain), Romualdas Vaitiekus (Lithuania)

29 August 2021
19:00

Australia	4–1	RPC
Horsburgh 1', 5', 19'; Smith 9'	Report	Arestova 19'

Makuhari Messe, Tokyo
Referee: Bas Spaans (Netherlands), Vaida Pokvytytė (Lithuania)

Quarterfinal

1 September 2021
19:30

United States	5–3	RPC
Mason 4', 8', 19'; Dennis 14', 19'	Report	Arestova 2', 7', 9'

Makuhari Messe, Tokyo
Referee: Romualdas Vaitiekus (Lithuania), Robert Avery (Great Britain)

== Judo ==
Men

Athlete	Event	Round of 16	Quarterfinals	Semifinals	Repechage 1	Repechage 2	Final / BM	
Athlete	Event	Opposition Result	Opposition Result	Opposition Result	Opposition Result	Opposition Result	Opposition Result	Rank
Viktor Rudenko	−66 kg	Tanaka (USA); W 10–00	Gamjashvili (GEO); L 00–11	Did not advance	Bye	Abasli (AZE); L 00–01	Did not advance	
Vasilii Kutuev	−73 kg	Bye	Nagai (JPN); W 10–00	Sayidov (UZB); L 00–10	Bye		Mahomedov (UKR); L 00–01	5
Vladimir Fedin	−90 kg	Amanzhol (KAZ); L 01–11	Did not advance					
Anatoliy Shevchenko	−100 kg	Bye	Goodrich (USA); L 00–01	Did not advance	—N/a	Basoc (MDA); W 10–00	Upmann (GER); W 11–00	3rd place, bronze medalist(s)

Women

Athlete	Event	Round of 16	Quarterfinals	Semifinals	Repechage 1	Repechage 2	Final / BM	
Athlete	Event	Opposition Result	Opposition Result	Opposition Result	Opposition Result	Opposition Result	Opposition Result	Rank
Viktoriia Potapova	−48 kg	Brussig (GER); W 01–00	Taşın (TUR); W 10–00	Hajiyeva (AZE); L 00–10	Bye		Lee (TPE); W 10–00	3rd place, bronze medalist(s)
Alesia Stepaniuk	−52 kg	Bye	Gagné (CAN); L 00–01	Did not advance	—N/a	Cardoso (BRA); W 11–00	Fujiwara (JPN); W 10–00	3rd place, bronze medalist(s)
Natalia Ovchinnikova	−57 kg	Bye	Çelik (TUR); L 00–10	Did not advance	—N/a	Fedossova (KAZ); W 10–00	Araújo (BRA); L 00–10	5
Olga Pozdnysheva	−63 kg	Çete (TUR); W 10–00	Sheripboeva (UZB); L 00–10	Did not advance	—N/a	Pernheim (SWE); W 10–00	Wang (CHN); L 00–10	5
Olga Zabrodskaia	−70 kg	Bye	Uluçam (TUR); L 00–01	Did not advance	Brešković (CRO); W 10–00	Lauria (ITA); W 10–00	Ogawa (JPN); L 00–01	5

== Paracanoeing ==
Russian athletes form some of the participating nations.

Athlete	Event	Heat		Semifinal		Final	
Athlete	Event	Time	Rank	Time	Rank	Time	Rank
Pavel Gromov	Men's KL1	56.390	5 SF	51.350	2 FA	52.111	4
Leonid Krylov	Men's KL3	40.318	1 FA	Bye		40.464	2nd place, silver medalist(s)
Igor Korobeynikov	Men's VL2	57.420	3 SF	55.357	2 FA	55.681	4
Egor Firsov	Men's VL3	54.094	3 SF	51.787	4 FB	54.511	10
Alexandra Dupik	Women's KL1	59.850	4 SF	58.673	3 FA	57.635	6
Nadezda Andreeva	Women's KL2	57.378	4 SF	54.801	2 FA	55.524	6
Mariia Nikiforova	Women's VL2	1:04.250	2 SF	1:01.085	1 FA	1:02.554	4

Qualification Legend: FA = Qualify to final (medal); FB = Qualify to final B (non-medal)

== Paratriathlon ==
Athlete	Event	Swim	Trans 1	Bike	Trans 2	Run	Total time	Rank
Mikhail Kolmakov	Men's PTS4	14:15	1:23	34:43	0:53	19:05	1:10:19	10
Veronika Gabitova	Women's PTS2	16:00	2:04	42:50	1:37	37:09	1:39:40	8
Anna Bychkova	Women's PTS5	14:34	1:19	40:42	1:04	21:39	1:19:18	8
Ksenia Vibornykh; Guide: Alena Zubova	Women's PTVI	14:45	1:37	35:09	1:13	23:14	1:15:58	9

== Powerlifting ==
Athlete	Event	Result	Rank
Kheda Berieva	Women's –73 kg	127	5
Vera Muratova	Women's –79 kg	132	3rd place, bronze medalist(s)

== Rowing ==
Russia qualified two boats for each of the following rowing classes into the Paralympic regatta. All of them qualified after successfully entering the top seven for men's single sculls and top eight for mixed coxed four at the 2019 World Rowing Championships in Ottensheim, Austria.

Athlete	Event	Heats		Repechage		Final	
Athlete	Event	Time	Rank	Time	Rank	Time	Rank
Aleksey Chuvashev	Men's single sculls	10:45.64	4 R	9:47.56	3 FB	10:26.99	7
Evgenii Borisov; Ekaterina Moshkovskaia; Anna Piskunova; Anton Voronov; Evgenii Terekhov (cox)	Mixed coxed four	7:36.34	4 R	7:22.31	4 FB	7:39.84	7

Qualification Legend: FA=Final A (medal); FB=Final B (non-medal); R=Repechage

== Shooting ==
Athlete	Event	Qualification		Final	
Athlete	Event	Score	Rank	Score	Rank
Oksana Berezovskaia	Women's P2 – 10 m air pistol SH1	548	11	Did not advance	
Andrey Kozhemyakin	Men's R1 – 10 m air rifle standing SH1	613.8	9	Did not advance	
Andrey Kozhemyakin	Mixed R3 – 10 m air rifle prone SH1	629.0	30	Did not advance	
Andrey Kozhemyakin	Mixed R6 – 50 m rifle prone SH1	604.0	44	Did not advance	
Andrey Kozhemyakin	Men's R7 – 50 m rifle three position SH1	1139	13	Did not advance	
Sergey Malyshev	Men's P1 – 10 m air pistol SH1	564	8 Q	113.3	8
Sergey Malyshev	Mixed P3 – 25 m pistol SH1	574	4 Q	17	4
Sergey Malyshev	Mixed P4 – 50 m pistol SH1	532	8 Q	196.8	3rd place, bronze medalist(s)
Sergei Nochevnoi	Mixed R3 – 10 m air rifle prone SH1	632.0	10	Did not advance	
Sergei Nochevnoi	Mixed R6 – 50 m rifle prone SH1	606.2	43	Did not advance	
Tatiana Ryabchenko	Mixed R3 – 10 m air rifle prone SH1	630.8	21	Did not advance	
Tatiana Ryabchenko	Mixed R6 – 50 m rifle prone SH1	608.4	37	Did not advance	
Antonina Zhukova	Mixed R5 – 10 m air rifle prone SH2	632.0	22	Did not advance	
Antonina Zhukova	Mixed R9 – 50 m rifle prone SH2	620.3	12	Did not advance	

== Sitting volleyball ==
Russian athletes form some of the participating nations. Men qualified in the 2019 ParaVolley Europe Zonal Championships, while women qualified through the 2018 World ParaVolley Championships.

Summary

Team	Event	Group stage				Semifinal	Final / BM / Cl.	
Team	Event	Opposition Score	Opposition Score	Opposition Score	Rank	Opposition Score	Opposition Score	Rank
RPC men's	Men's tournament	Japan; W 3–0	Bosnia and Herzegovina; W 3–0	Egypt; W 3–0	1 Q	Brazil; W 3–1	Iran; L 1–3	2nd place, silver medalist(s)
RPC women's	Women's tournament	China; L 0–3	Rwanda; W 3–0	United States; L 0–3	3	Did not advance	Italy; W 3–1	5

=== Men's tournament ===
Group play

Pos	Team	Pld	W	L	Pts	SW	SL	SR	SPW	SPL	SPR	Qualification
1	RPC (RPC)	3	3	0	3	9	0	MAX	225	151	1.490	Semifinals
2	Bosnia and Herzegovina	3	2	1	2	6	3	2.000	205	176	1.165	Semifinals
3	Egypt	3	1	2	1	3	6	0.500	193	174	1.109	Fifth place match
4	Japan	3	0	3	0	0	9	0.000	103	225	0.458	Seventh place match

Source: TOCOG

27 August 2021; 14:00 v	Japan	0–3	RPC (RPC)	Makuhari Messe, Tokyo; Referees: Khalid Shanishah (LBA), Christina Fiebich (USA)
27 August 2021; 14:00 v	(6–25, 17–25, 15–25); Results Statistics			Makuhari Messe, Tokyo; Referees: Khalid Shanishah (LBA), Christina Fiebich (USA)

29 August 2021; 10:00 v	RPC (RPC)	3–0	Bosnia and Herzegovina	Makuhari Messe, Tokyo; Referees: Neal Konowalyk (CAN), Ebrahim Firouzi (IRI)
29 August 2021; 10:00 v	(25–19, 25–18, 25–18); Results Statistics			Makuhari Messe, Tokyo; Referees: Neal Konowalyk (CAN), Ebrahim Firouzi (IRI)

31 August 2021; 10:00 v	Egypt	0–3	RPC (RPC)	Makuhari Messe, Tokyo; Referees: Dominik Raca (CRO), Ute Fischer (GER)
31 August 2021; 10:00 v	(21–25, 17–25, 20–25); Results Statistics			Makuhari Messe, Tokyo; Referees: Dominik Raca (CRO), Ute Fischer (GER)

Semifinal

2 September 2021; 18:30 v	RPC (RPC)	3–1	Brazil	Makuhari Messe, Tokyo; Referees: Haris Helać (BIH), Christina Fiebich (USA)
2 September 2021; 18:30 v	(22–25, 25–21, 25–19, 25–19); Results Statistics			Makuhari Messe, Tokyo; Referees: Haris Helać (BIH), Christina Fiebich (USA)

Gold medal match

4 September 2021; 19:00 v	(silver) RPC (RPC)	1–3	Iran (gold)	Makuhari Messe, Tokyo; Referees: Toomas Murulo (EST), Benno Meijer (NED)
4 September 2021; 19:00 v	(21–25, 14–25, 25–19, 17–25); Results Statistics			Makuhari Messe, Tokyo; Referees: Toomas Murulo (EST), Benno Meijer (NED)

=== Women's tournament ===
Group play

Pos	Team	Pld	W	L	Pts	SW	SL	SR	SPW	SPL	SPR	Qualification
1	China	3	3	0	3	9	0	MAX	226	137	1.650	Semifinals
2	United States	3	2	1	2	6	3	2.000	213	163	1.307	Semifinals
3	RPC	3	1	2	1	3	6	0.500	181	180	1.006	Fifth place match
4	Rwanda	3	0	3	0	0	9	0.000	85	225	0.378	Seventh place match

Source: TOCOG

28 August 2021; 20:30 v	China	3–0	RPC	Makuhari Messe, Tokyo; Referees: Benno Meijer (NED), Marie-Claude Richer (CAN)
28 August 2021; 20:30 v	(25–20, 25–16, 25–14); Results Statistics			Makuhari Messe, Tokyo; Referees: Benno Meijer (NED), Marie-Claude Richer (CAN)

30 August 2021; 10:00 v	Rwanda	0–3	RPC	Makuhari Messe, Tokyo; Referees: Barbara Pakuła (POL), Huang Xiao (CHN)
30 August 2021; 10:00 v	(9–25, 9–25, 12–25); Results Statistics			Makuhari Messe, Tokyo; Referees: Barbara Pakuła (POL), Huang Xiao (CHN)

1 September 2021; 18:30 v	RPC	0–3	United States	Makuhari Messe, Tokyo; Referees: Neal Konowalyk (CAN), Vanessa Redes (BRA)
1 September 2021; 18:30 v	(19–25, 15–25, 22–25); Results Statistics			Makuhari Messe, Tokyo; Referees: Neal Konowalyk (CAN), Vanessa Redes (BRA)

Fifth place match

3 September 2021; 15:30 v	Italy	1–3	RPC	Makuhari Messe, Tokyo; Referees: Dominik Raca (CRO), Khalid Shanishah (LBA)
3 September 2021; 15:30 v	(25–22, 23–25, 23–25, 14–25); Results Statistics			Makuhari Messe, Tokyo; Referees: Dominik Raca (CRO), Khalid Shanishah (LBA)

== Swimming ==
Men

Athlete	Event	Heats		Final	
Athlete	Event	Result	Rank	Result	Rank
Dmitrii Bartasinskii	50 m freestyle S10	24.77	6 Q	24.48	6
Dmitrii Bartasinskii	100 m freestyle S10	55.31	8 Q	54.09	7
Dmitrii Bartasinskii	400 m freestyle S10	4:32.51	9	Did not advance	
Dmitrii Bartasinskii	100 m breaststroke SB9	—N/a		1:08.06	3rd place, bronze medalist(s)
Aleksandr Beliaev	50 m freestyle S3	DNS		Did not advance	
Aleksandr Beliaev	200 m freestyle S3	4:20.29	10	Did not advance	
Aleksandr Beliaev	50 m backstroke S3	55.52	9	Did not advance	
Dmitrii Cherniaev	200 m freestyle S5	2:48.18	6 Q	2:51.91	7
Dmitrii Cherniaev	50 m backstroke S5	42.99	13	Did not advance	
Dmitrii Cherniaev	100 m breaststroke SB4	1:33.42	1 Q	1:31.96 WR	1st place, gold medalist(s)
Dmitrii Cherniaev	50 m butterfly S5	38.72	9	Did not advance	
Vladimir Danilenko	200 m freestyle S2	4:14.09	1 Q	4:15.95	3rd place, bronze medalist(s)
Vladimir Danilenko	50 m backstroke S2	59.31	4 Q	59.47	3rd place, bronze medalist(s)
Vladimir Danilenko	100 m backstroke S2	2:02.07	1 Q	2:02.74	3rd place, bronze medalist(s)
Egor Efrosinin	50 m freestyle S7	28.24	2 Q	28.31	4
Egor Efrosinin	100 m breaststroke SB7	—N/a		1:16.43	2nd place, silver medalist(s)
Egor Efrosinin	50 m butterfly S7	31.55	8 Q	30.46	6
Egor Efrosinin	200 m individual medley SM7	2:51.87	10	Did not advance	
Maksim Emelianov	100 m freestyle S4	1:42.31	13	Did not advance	
Maksim Emelianov	200 m freestyle S4	3:27.63	11	Did not advance	
Maksim Emelianov	50 m breaststroke SB3	51.33	4 Q	50.63	5
Maksim Emelianov	150 m individual medley SM4	2:54.56	13	Did not advance	
Viacheslav Emeliantsev	200 m freestyle S14	1:57.76	4 Q	1:55.58	3rd place, bronze medalist(s)
Viacheslav Emeliantsev	100 m backstroke S14	1:01.52	8 Q	59.05	2nd place, silver medalist(s)
Ilnur Garipov	50 m freestyle S11	28.39	11	Did not advance	
Andrei Gladkov	100 m freestyle S8	1:07.33	18	Did not advance	
Andrei Gladkov	400 m freestyle S7	5:16.36	9	Did not advance	
Andrei Gladkov	100 m backstroke S7	1:10.84	3 Q	1:10.58	4
Andrei Granichka	400 m freestyle S6	5:15.38	5 Q	5:05.30	4
Andrei Granichka	100 m breaststroke SB5	1:28.20	2 Q	1:25.13 WR	1st place, gold medalist(s)
Andrei Granichka	50 m butterfly S6	34.87	11	Did not advance	
Andrei Granichka	200 m individual medley SM6	2:45.95	2 Q	2:40.92	2nd place, silver medalist(s)
Dmitry Grigoryev	50 m freestyle S10	24.85	7 Q	24.61	7
Dmitry Grigoryev	100 m freestyle S10	55.55	10	Did not advance	
Dmitry Grigoryev	100 m breaststroke SB9	—N/a		1:08.56	4
Dmitry Grigoryev	100 m butterfly S10	58.43	4 Q	58.45	6
Artem Isaev	100 m freestyle S10	57.62	15	Did not advance	
Artem Isaev	100 m backstroke S10	1:07.92	10	Did not advance	
Artem Isaev	100 m breaststroke SB9	—N/a		1:07.45	2nd place, silver medalist(s)
Artem Isaev	200 m individual medley SM10	2:25.85	8 Q	2:20.37	7
Andrei Kalina	100 m breaststroke SB8	1:08.46	1 Q	1:07.24	1st place, gold medalist(s)
Andrei Kalina	200 m individual medley SM9	2:21.39	4 Q	2:14.90	1st place, gold medalist(s)
Nikita Kazachiner	200 m freestyle S2	DNS		Did not advance	
Nikita Kazachiner	50 m backstroke S2	1:00.51	5 Q	1:00.54	4
Nikita Kazachiner	100 m backstroke S2	DNS		Did not advance	
Artur Kubasov	50 m freestyle S5	35.87	11	Did not advance	
Artur Kubasov	100 m freestyle S5	1:21.26	13	Did not advance	
Artur Kubasov	200 m freestyle S5	2:49.92	7 Q	2:49.67	6
Artur Kubasov	50 m backstroke S5	43.19	14	Did not advance	
Artur Kubasov	50 m butterfly S5	42.24	17	Did not advance	
Pavel Kuklin	100 m backstroke S8	1:09.77	6 Q	1:09.26	6
Mikhail Kuliabin	200 m freestyle S14	1:58.25	7 Q	1:56.74	8
Mikhail Kuliabin	100 m backstroke S14	1:01.48	6 Q	1:01.15	6
Mikhail Kuliabin	100 m breaststroke SB14	1:08.88	9	Did not advance	
Mikhail Kuliabin	100 m butterfly SB14	58.47	12	Did not advance	
Mikhail Kuliabin	200 m individual medley SM14	2:13.94	4 Q	2:12.00	5
Viacheslav Lenskii	100 m freestyle S6	1:09.19	10	Did not advance	
Viacheslav Lenskii	400 m freestyle S6	5:11.07	2 Q	5:04.84	3rd place, bronze medalist(s)
Viacheslav Lenskii	100 m backstroke S6	1:21.45	9	Did not advance	
Iurii Luchkin	100 m backstroke S6	1:25.75	15	Did not advance	
Iurii Luchkin	100 m breaststroke SB5	1:31.06	3 Q	1:31.34	4
Iurii Luchkin	200 m individual medley SM6	3:04.44	14	Did not advance	
Roman Makarov	100 m freestyle S12	1:01.01	6 Q	57.56	6
Roman Makarov	100 m backstroke S12	—N/a		1:02.85	5
Roman Makarov	100 m butterfly S12	1:00.00	5 Q	58.65	3rd place, bronze medalist(s)
Aleksandr Molkov	100 m breaststroke SB4	1:44.37	4 Q	1:41.27	4
Bogdan Mozgovoi	50 m freestyle S9	25.86	6 Q	25.56	6
Bogdan Mozgovoi	100 m backstroke S9	1:02.65	2 Q	1:01.65 PR	1st place, gold medalist(s)
Maksim Nikiforov	100 m breaststroke SB13	1:08.14	7 Q	1:07.92	7
Maksim Nikiforov	200 m individual medley SM13	2:23.13	12	Did not advance	
Andrei Nikolaev	100 m freestyle S8	59.80	4 Q	57.69	2nd place, silver medalist(s)
Andrei Nikolaev	400 m freestyle S8	4:31.88	2 Q	4:25.16	1st place, gold medalist(s)
Igor Plotnikov	50 m backstroke S5	37.93	6 Q	37.40	6
Igor Plotnikov	50 m butterfly S5	41.60	15	Did not advance	
Sergey Punko	100 m freestyle S12	1:01.02	7 Q	59.30	7
Sergey Punko	400 m freestyle S13	4:28.91	8 Q	4:28.52	8
Sergey Punko	100 m breaststroke SB12	—N/a		1:14.87	8
Sergey Punko	100 m butterfly S12	1:06.63	9	Did not advance	
Artur Saifutdinov	100 m backstroke S12	—N/a		1:07.36	6
Artur Saifutdinov	100 m breaststroke SB12	—N/a		1:05.76	3rd place, bronze medalist(s)
Artur Saifutdinov	200 m individual medley SM13	2:21.45	11	Did not advance	
Alexander Skaliukh	50 m freestyle S9	26.60	13	Did not advance	
Alexander Skaliukh	100 m butterfly S9	1:01.54	5 Q	1:00.54	3rd place, bronze medalist(s)
Daniil Smirnov	100 m breaststroke SB8	1:10.86	4 Q	1:11.45	5
Vladimir Sotnikov	400 m freestyle S13	4:20.66	4 Q	4:15.93	5
Vladimir Sotnikov	100 m backstroke S13	1:02.05	5 Q	59.86	3rd place, bronze medalist(s)
Vladimir Sotnikov	200 m individual medley SM13	2:17.40	7 Q	2:14.38	7
Denis Tarasov	50 m freestyle S9	25.37	2 Q	24.99	2nd place, silver medalist(s)
Denis Tarasov	100 m butterfly S9	1:05.08	14	Did not advance	
Roman Zhdanov	50 m freestyle S4	42.18	11	Did not advance	
Roman Zhdanov	100 m freestyle S4	1:29.60	4 Q	1:26.95	3rd place, bronze medalist(s)
Roman Zhdanov	200 m freestyle S4	3:06.06	5 Q	2:58.48	3rd place, bronze medalist(s)
Roman Zhdanov	50 m backstroke S4	41.77	2 Q	40.99 WR	1st place, gold medalist(s)
Roman Zhdanov	50 m breaststroke SB3	50.44	3 Q	46.49 WR	1st place, gold medalist(s)
Roman Zhdanov	150 m individual medley SM4	2:29.83	1 Q	2:21.17 WR	1st place, gold medalist(s)
Dmitrii Bartasinskii; Andrei Gladkov; Bogdan Mozgovoi; Andrei Nikolaev	4 × 100 m freestyle relay 34pts	—N/a		3:54.34	5
Andrei Gladkov*; Dmitry Grigoryev*; Andrei Kalina; Bogdan Mozgovoi; Andrei Nikolaev; Alexander Skaliukh; Daniil Smirnov*; Denis Tarasov*	4 × 100 m medley relay 34pts	4:18.70	1 Q	4:06.59 WR	1st place, gold medalist(s)

Women

Athlete	Event	Heats		Final	
Athlete	Event	Result	Rank	Result	Rank
Nataliia Butkova	50 m freestyle S4	43.95	7 Q	43.75	7
Nataliia Butkova	50 m backstroke S4	54.79	7 Q	55.18	8
Nataliia Butkova	50 m breaststroke SB3	1:03.56	5 Q	1:00.54	2nd place, silver medalist(s)
Nataliia Butkova	150 m individual medley SM4	2:57.40	3 Q	2:53.25	3rd place, bronze medalist(s)
Anastasia Diodorova	100 m backstroke S6	1:25.96	9	Did not advance	
Anastasia Diodorova	50 m butterfly S6	41.51	12	Did not advance	
Anastasiia Gontar	50 m freestyle S10	27.48	1 Q	27.38	1st place, gold medalist(s)
Anastasiia Gontar	100 m freestyle S10	1:02.39	9	Did not advance	
Anastasiia Gontar	100 m backstroke S10	1:12.30	6 Q	1:11.49	6
Viktoriia Ishchiulova	50 m freestyle S8	30.35	1 Q	29.91	1st place, gold medalist(s)
Viktoriia Ishchiulova	100 m backstroke S8	—N/a		DNS	
Viktoriia Ishchiulova	100 m breaststroke SB8	DNS		Did not advance	
Viktoriia Ishchiulova	100 m butterfly S8	—N/a		1:10.80	2nd place, silver medalist(s)
Viktoriia Ishchiulova	200 m individual medley SM8	DNS		Did not advance	
Elena Kliachkina	100 m freestyle S9	1:10.59	19	Did not advance	
Elena Kliachkina	100 m breaststroke SB8	1:31.60	8 Q	1:29.72	7
Elena Kliachkina	200 m individual medley SM9	2:54.07	14	Did not advance	
Anna Krivshina	50 m freestyle S13	27.25 PR	2 Q	27.06	2nd place, silver medalist(s)
Anna Krivshina	100 m backstroke S13	1:09.15	5 Q	1:07.29	4
Mariia Latritskaia	50 m freestyle S13	28.67	13	Did not advance	
Mariia Latritskaia	100 m breaststroke SB13	1:21.11	6 Q	1:17.59	4
Mariia Latritskaia	200 m individual medley SM13	2:46.08	11	Did not advance	
Daria Lukianenko	400 m freestyle S13	4:54.07	11	Did not advance	
Daria Lukianenko	100 m breaststroke SB12	—N/a		1:17.55	2nd place, silver medalist(s)
Daria Lukianenko	200 m individual medley SM13	2:34.27	6 Q	2:30.22	4
Veronika Medchainova	100 m freestyle S3	2:47.96	13	Did not advance	
Veronika Medchainova	50 m backstroke S2	1:13.23	4 Q	1:14.59	6
Veronika Medchainova	100 m backstroke S2	2:40.97	5 Q	2:40.05	5
Ani Palian	50 m freestyle S8	33.82	10	Did not advance	
Ani Palian	100 m freestyle S7	1:14.40	6 Q	1:15.38	7
Ani Palian	50 m butterfly S7	35.71	4 Q	35.73	4
Mariia Pavlova	50 m freestyle S8	33.98	11	Did not advance	
Mariia Pavlova	400 m freestyle S8	—N/a		6:00.36	8
Mariia Pavlova	100 m backstroke S8	—N/a		1:23.24	6
Mariia Pavlova	100 m breaststroke SB7	1:33.15	1 Q	1:31.44	1st place, gold medalist(s)
Mariia Pavlova	200 m individual medley SM8	2:52.19	2 Q	2:48.63	3rd place, bronze medalist(s)
Daria Pikalova	50 m freestyle S13	27.70	5 Q	27.39	5
Daria Pikalova	100 m freestyle S12	59.48	1 Q	59.13	2nd place, silver medalist(s)
Daria Pikalova	100 m backstroke S12	—N/a		1:08.76	2nd place, silver medalist(s)
Daria Pikalova	100 m butterfly S13	1:06.20	2 Q	1:05.86	3rd place, bronze medalist(s)
Daria Pikalova	200 m individual medley SM13	2:57.37	12	Did not advance	
Sofiia Polikarpova	50 m freestyle S11	32.36	11	Did not advance	
Sofiia Polikarpova	100 m freestyle S11	1:12.46	6 Q	1:11.52	7
Sofiia Polikarpova	100 m backstroke S11	1:22.34	5 Q	1:21.52	5
Sofiia Polikarpova	100 m breaststroke SB11	1:32.89	7 Q	1:32.84	7
Olga Poteshkina	200 m freestyle S14	2:23.94	12	Did not advance	
Olga Poteshkina	100 m backstroke S14	1:17.00	13	Did not advance	
Olga Poteshkina	100 m breaststroke SB14	1:31.19	15	Did not advance	
Olga Poteshkina	100 m butterfly S14	1:15.46	15	Did not advance	
Olga Poteshkina	200 m individual medley SM14	2:44.45	15	Did not advance	
Adelina Razetdinova	100 m breaststroke SB8	1:26.29	3 Q	1:24.77	3rd place, bronze medalist(s)
Valeriia Shabalina	200 m freestyle S14	2:09.55	1 Q	2:03.71	1st place, gold medalist(s)
Valeriia Shabalina	100 m backstroke S14	1:08.64	3 Q	1:06.85	2nd place, silver medalist(s)
Valeriia Shabalina	100 m breaststroke SB14	1:21.86	9	Did not advance	
Valeriia Shabalina	100 m butterfly S14	1:05.37 PR	1 Q	1:03.59 WR	1st place, gold medalist(s)
Valeriia Shabalina	200 m individual medley SM14	2:26.84	1 Q	2:20.99	1st place, gold medalist(s)
Zoya Shchurova	100 m freestyle S3	2:08.56	5 Q	2:07.69	5
Zoya Shchurova	50 m backstroke S3	59.60	4 Q	1:00.25	5
Zoya Shchurova	50 m breaststroke SB3	1:07.57	9	Did not advance	
Zoya Shchurova	150 m individual medley SM4	3:28.29	12	Did not advance	
Anastasiia Shevchenko	50 m freestyle S11	31.85	10	Did not advance	
Anastasiia Shevchenko	100 m freestyle S11	1:10.94	5 Q	1:10.22	5
Anastasiia Shevchenko	400 m freestyle S11	5:37.04	6 Q	5:29.34	7
Anastasiia Shevchenko	100 m backstroke S11	1:20.07	4 Q	1:20.00	4
Anastasiia Shevchenko	200 m individual medley SM11	3:00.29	6 Q	3:00.13	6
Iuliia Shishova	100 m freestyle S3	1:50.72	3 Q	1:49.63	3rd place, bronze medalist(s)
Iuliia Shishova	50 m backstroke S3	56.89	3 Q	57.03	3rd place, bronze medalist(s)
Elizaveta Sidorenko	50 m freestyle S10	DNS		Did not advance	
Elizaveta Sidorenko	100 m freestyle S10	DNS		Did not advance	
Elizaveta Sidorenko	100 m backstroke S10	1:16.59	11	Did not advance	
Elizaveta Sidorenko	100 m breaststroke SB9	DNS		Did not advance	
Elizaveta Sidorenko	200 m individual medley SM10	2:41.68	9	Did not advance	
Aleksandra Ziablitseva	400 m freestyle S13	4:58.15	12	Did not advance	
Aleksandra Ziablitseva	100 m backstroke S13	1:10.07	9	Did not advance	
Anastasiia Gontar; Elena Kliachkina; Ani Palian; Mariia Pavlova	4 × 100 m freestyle relay 34pts	—N/a		4:41.78	6
Anastasiia Gontar; Viktoriia Ishchiulova; Ani Palian; Elizaveta Sidorenko	4 × 100 m medley relay 34pts	—N/a		4:55.55	2nd place, silver medalist(s)

Mixed

Athlete	Event	Heats		Final	
Athlete	Event	Result	Rank	Result	Rank
Nataliia Butkova; Dmitrii Cherniaev*; Anastasia Diodorova*; Artur Kubasov; Ani Palian; Igor Plotnikov*; Roman Zhdanov	4 × 50 m freestyle relay 20pts	2:36.57	5 Q	2:35.66	6
Viacheslav Emeliantsev; Mikhail Kuliabin; Olga Poteshkina; Valeriia Shabalina	4 × 100 m freestyle relay S14	—N/a		DSQ	
Ilnur Garipov; Anna Krivshina; Daria Pikalova; Vladimir Sotnikov	4 × 100 m freestyle relay 49pts	—N/a		3:53.79 PR	1st place, gold medalist(s)

== Table tennis ==
Russian athletes form some of the participating nations.

Men

Athlete	Event	Group stage				Round of 16	Quarterfinal	Semifinal	Final	
Athlete	Event	Opposition Score	Opposition Score	Opposition Score	Rank	Opposition Score	Opposition Score	Opposition Score	Opposition Score	Rank
Dmitrii Lavrov	C1	Nam (KOR); L 0–3	Matthews (GBR); L 1–3	—N/a	3	Did not advance				
Rasul Nazirov	C2	Czuper (POL); L 0–3	Sastre (ESP); W 3–2	—N/a	2 Q	Perlić (SRB); W 3–2	Lamirault (FRA); L 0–3	Did not advance		
Vladimir Toporkov	C3	Schmidberger (GER); L 0–3	Baek (KOR); W 3–2	—N/a	2 Q	Judge (IRL); W 3–1	Van Emburgh (USA); L 0–3	Did not advance		
Iurii Nozdrunov	C9	Kats (UKR); W 3–2	Facey (GBR); L 2–3	Iwabuchi (JPN); W 3–2	1 Q	—N/a	Stacey (GBR); W 3–2	Devos (BEL); L 2–3	Did not advance	3rd place, bronze medalist(s)
Dmitrii Lavrov; Rasul Nazirov	Team C1–2	—N/a					Poland; L 0–2	Did not advance		

Women

Athlete	Event	Group stage				Round of 16	Quarterfinal	Semifinal	Final	
Athlete	Event	Opposition Score	Opposition Score	Opposition Score	Rank	Opposition Score	Opposition Score	Opposition Score	Opposition Score	Rank
Nadezhda Pushpasheva	C1–2	Seo (KOR); L 2–3	Al-Myrisl (KSA); W 3–0	—N/a	2 Q	—N/a	Bucław (POL); W 3–1	Liu (CHN); L 1–3	Did not advance	3rd place, bronze medalist(s)
Aleksandra Vasileva	C4	Zhang (CHN); L 0–3	Jaion (THA); L 0–3	—N/a	3	Did not advance				
Maliak Alieva	C6	Al-Dayyeni (IRQ); W 3–1	Lee (KOR); W 3–1	—N/a	1 Q	—N/a	Julian (AUS); W 3–0	Grebe (GER); W 3–0	Lytovchenko (UKR); L 0–3	2nd place, silver medalist(s)
Raisa Chebanika	C6	Moon (KOR); W 3–1	Grebe (GER); L 1–3	—N/a	2 Q	—N/a	Lee (KOR); W 3–2	Lytovchenko (UKR); L 0–3	Did not advance	3rd place, bronze medalist(s)
Viktoriia Safonova	C7	Korkut (TUR); L 1–3	Korneliussen (NOR); W 3–0	—N/a	2 Q	—N/a	Wang (CHN); W 3–0	Barnéoud (FRA); W 3–1	Van Zon (NED); L 2–3	2nd place, silver medalist(s)
Elena Prokofeva	C11	Łysiak (POL); W 3–0	Ng (HKG); W 3–0	Ito (JPN); W 3–0	1 Q	—N/a		Wong (HKG); W 3–1	Ferney (FRA); W 3–1	1st place, gold medalist(s)
Nadezhda Pushpasheva; Aleksandra Vasileva	Team C4–5	—N/a					Serbia; L 0–2	Did not advance		
Maliak Alieva; Raisa Chebanika; Viktoriia Safonova	Team C6–8	—N/a					Brazil; W 2–0	Netherlands; L 1–2	Did not advance	3rd place, bronze medalist(s)

== Taekwondo ==
Russia qualified four athletes to compete at the Paralympics competition. All of them qualified by finishing top six in world ranking.

Athlete	Event	Round of 16	Quarterfinals	Semifinals	Repechage 1	Repechage 2	Final / BM	
Athlete	Event	Opposition Result	Opposition Result	Opposition Result	Opposition Result	Opposition Result	Opposition Result	Rank
Daniil Sidorov	Men's −61 kg	Khalilov (AZE); W 25–19	Bozteke (TUR); W 26–21	El-Zayat (EGY); L RSC	Bye		Kong (FRA); W 33–23	3rd place, bronze medalist(s)
Magomedzagir Isaldibirov	Men's −75 kg	Joo (KOR); W 35–31	Kudo (JPN); W 31–23	García (MEX); L 12–14	Bye		Joo (KOR); L 14–24	5
Zainutdin Ataev	Men's +75 kg	Lane (GBR); W 36–5	Yakut (TUR); W 30–8	Aziziaghdam (IRI); L 4–9	Bye		Pedroza (MEX); W 18–4	3rd place, bronze medalist(s)
Anna Poddubskaia	Women's −49 kg	Es-Sabbar (MAR); W 41–15	Marchuk (UKR); W 63–34	Çavdar (TUR); L 11–22	Bye		Marchuk (UKR); W 46–11	3rd place, bronze medalist(s)

== Wheelchair fencing ==
Men

Athlete	Event	Pool round		Round of 16	Quarterfinal	Semifinal	Final / BM	
Athlete	Event	Opposition Score	Rank	Opposition Score	Opposition Score	Opposition Score	Opposition Score	Rank
Maxim Shaburov	Épée A	Lambertini (ITA) W 5–3; Rousell (CAN) W 5–4; Akkaya (TUR) W 5–4; Schmidt (GER) W 5–3; Al-Madhkhoori (IRQ) W 5–4; Tian (CHN) W 5–4	2 Q	Bye	Al-Madhkhoori (IRQ); W 15–7	Tian (CHN); W 15–14	Gilliver (GBR); L 9–15	2nd place, silver medalist(s)
Artur Yusupov	Épée A	Noble (FRA) W 5–2; Gilliver (GBR) L 4–5; Pender (POL) W 5–4; Sun (CHN) L 4–5; Giordan (ITA) W 5–1; Manko (UKR) L 2–5	5 Q	Bye	Sun (CHN); L 7–15	Did not advance		
Alexander Kurzin	Épée B	Naumenko (UKR) L 1–5; Hu (CHN) W 5–4; Tarjányi (HUN) W 5–4; Guissone (BRA) L 1–5; Pranevich (BLR) L 4–5	7 Q	Hu (CHN); L 5–15	Did not advance			
Alexander Kuzyukov	Épée B	Ali (IRQ) W 5–2; Mainville (CAN) W 5–1; Fujita (JPN) W 5–1; Peter (FRA) W 5–3; Coutya (GBR) L 3–5; Datsko (UKR) W 5–4	2 Q	Bye	Hu (CHN); W 15–5	Pranevich (BLR); W 15–13	Guissone (BRA); W 15–8	1st place, gold medalist(s)
Alexander Kuzyukov; Maxim Shaburov; Artur Yusupov	Team épée	China L 38–45; Iraq W 45–29; Italy W 45–18	Q	—N/a		Great Britain; W 45–35	China; W 45–39	1st place, gold medalist(s)
Nikita Nagaev	Foil A	Osváth (HUN) L 1–5; Betti (ITA) W 5–4; Akkaya (TUR) W 5–3; Al-Madhkhoori (IRQ) W 5–2	7 Q	Yusupov (RPC); W 15–5	Tokatlian (FRA); W 15–3	Osváth (HUN); L 8–15	Betti (ITA); W 15–11	3rd place, bronze medalist(s)
Artur Yusupov	Foil A	Li (CHN) L 3–5; Lambertini (ITA) W 5–2; Tokatlian (FRA) L 3–5; Pender (POL) L 2–5	10 Q	Nagaev (RPC); L 5–15	Did not advance			
Albert Kamalov	Foil B	Datsko (UKR) W 5–4; Cima (ITA) W 5–0; Guissone (BRA) W 5–1; Castro (POL) W 5–1; Fujita (JPN) W 5–2; Hu (CHN) L 2–5	4 Q	Bye	Datsko (UKR); W 15–12	Hu (CHN); L 4–15	Coutya (GBR); W 15–2	3rd place, bronze medalist(s)
Alexander Kuzyukov	Foil B	Onda (JPN) W 5–1; Chaves (BRA) W 5–3; Coutya (GBR) L 1–5; Valet (FRA) L 2–5; Feng (CHN) L 1–5; Naumenko (UKR) L 4–5	9 Q	Cima (ITA); W 15–11	Hu (CHN); L 7–15	Did not advance		
Albert Kamalov; Nikita Nagaev; Artur Yusupov	Team foil	Great Britain L 44–45; Italy W 45–41; Ukraine W 45–32	Q	—N/a		China; L 35–45	France; L 40–45	4
Nikita Nagaev	Sabre A	Tian (CHN) L 2–5; Noble (FRA) W 5–2; Manko (UKR) L 3–5; Gilliver (GBR) L 2–5	11 Q	Ntounis (GRE); W 15–13	Manko (UKR); L 6–15	Did not advance		
Maxim Shaburov	Sabre A	Osváth (HUN) W 5–3; Hébert (CAN) W 5–1; Ntounis (GRE) W 5–1; Kano (JPN) W 5–0	1 Q	Bye	Li (CHN); L 6–15	Did not advance		
Albert Kamalov	Sabre B	Onda (JPN) W 5–2; Triantafyllou (GRE) W 5–2; Pranevich (BLR) W 5–2; Feng (CHN) W 5–4; Castro (POL) L 3–5	4 Q	Bye	Feng (CHN); L 6–15	Did not advance		
Alexander Kurzin	Sabre B	Chaves (BRA) W 5–0; Tarjányi (HUN) W 5–3; Valet (FRA) W 5–3; Pluta (POL) W 5–4; Mainville (CAN) W 5–2	1 Q	Bye	Valet (FRA); L 10–15	Did not advance		

Women

Athlete	Event	Pool round		Round of 16	Quarterfinal	Semifinal	Final / BM	
Athlete	Event	Opposition Score	Rank	Opposition Score	Opposition Score	Opposition Score	Opposition Score	Rank
Alena Evdokimova	Épée A	Collis-McCann (GBR) W 5–4; Matsumoto (JPN) W 5–1; Rong (CHN) W 5–4; Dróżdż (POL) W 5–3; Veres (HUN) L 4–5	4 Q	Bye	Veres (HUN); L 13–15	Did not advance		
Iuliia Maya	Épée A	Krajnyák (HUN) W 5–2; Yu (HKG) W 5–4; Oliveira (BRA) W 5–0; Mandryk (UKR) W 5–1	2 Q	Bye	Breus (UKR); W 14–6	Rong (CHN); L 6–9	Bian (CHN); L 5–6	4
Viktoria Boykova	Épée B	Hayes (USA) W 5–1; Zhou (CHN) L 1–5; Haręza (POL) W 5–2; Sakurai (JPN) W 5–3; Makrytskaya (BLR) W 5–4; Chung (HKG) W 5–2	3 Q	Bye	Sakurai (JPN); W 15–3	Zhou (CHN); W 15–14	Tan (CHN); L 0–3	2nd place, silver medalist(s)
Ludmila Vasileva	Épée B	Pasquino (ITA) L 0–2; Fedota (UKR) W 5–2; Jana (THA) W 5–4; Tan (CHN) L 0–5; Geddes (USA) W 5–2; Dani (HUN) W 2–5	8 Q	Haręza (POL); W 15–7	Tan (CHN); L 7–15	Did not advance		
Viktoria Boykova; Alena Evdokimova; Iuliia Maya	Team épée	Poland W 44–31; Hong Kong W 45–22	Q	—N/a		China; L 24–45	Hong Kong; W 45–34	3rd place, bronze medalist(s)
Alena Evdokimova	Foil A	Ng (HKG) L 2–5; Gu (CHN) L 2–5; Hajmási (HUN) L 0–5; Tibilashvili (GEO) W 5–4	13	Did not advance				
Evgeniya Sycheva	Foil A	Morel (CAN) W 5–2; Rong (CHN) L 2–5; Trigilia (ITA) L 4–5; Oliveira (BRA) W 5–1; Morkvych (UKR) L 3–5	9 Q	Trigilia (ITA); W 15–7	Gu (CHN); L 4–15	Did not advance		
Irina Mishurova	Foil B	Zhou (CHN) L 4–5; Makrytskaya (BLR) W 5–4; Geddes (USA) W 5–1; Tauber (GER) W 5–4; Mező (HUN) W 5–2; Sakurai (JPN) W 5–1	4 Q	Bye	Vasileva (RPC); L 13–15	Did not advance		
Ludmila Vasileva	Foil B	Santos (BRA) W 5–2; Xiao (CHN) L 1–5; Vio (ITA) L 0–5; Abe (JPN) W 5–2; Chung (HKG) W 5–3; Khetsuriani (GEO) L 3–5	5 Q	Bye	Mishurova (RPC); W 15–13	Vio (ITA); L 4–15	Xiao (CHN); W 15–12	3rd place, bronze medalist(s)
Alena Evdokimova; Iuliia Maya; Irina Mishurova	Team foil	China L 41–45; Georgia W 45–36; Hungary L 41–45		—N/a		Did not advance		
Evgeniya Sycheva	Sabre A	Tibilashvili (GEO) L 0–5; Dróżdż (POL) L 3–5; Gu (CHN) L 0–5; Morel (CAN) W 5–3	11 Q	Breus (UKR); L 7–15	Did not advance			
Irina Mishurova	Sabre B	Fedota (UKR) L 2–5; Tan (CHN) L 1–5; Abe (JPN) W 5–2; Mező (HUN) L 1–5; Santos (BRA) W 5–3	8 Q	Tauber (GER); L 14–15	Did not advance			

== Wheelchair tennis ==
Russia qualified two player entries for wheelchair tennis. One of them qualified through the world rankings, while the other qualified under the bipartite commission invitation allocation quota.

Athlete	Event	Round of 32	Round of 16	Quarterfinals	Semifinals	Final / BM	
Athlete	Event	Opposition Result	Opposition Result	Opposition Result	Opposition Result	Opposition Result	Rank
Liudmila Bubnova	Women's singles	Mörch (FRA); L 2–6, 1–6	Did not advance				
Viktoriia Lvova	Women's singles	Caldeira (BRA); W 6–0, 6–2	Ohtani (JPN); L 5–7, 1–6	Did not advance			
Liudmila Bubnova; Viktoriia Lvova	Women's doubles	—N/a	Fairbank / Mörch (FRA); W 2–6, 7–5, 6–2	De Groot / Van Koot (NED); L 2–6, 1–6	Did not advance		

== See also ==
- Russian Olympic Committee athletes at the 2020 Summer Olympics
- Russia at the Olympics
- Russia at the Paralympics
