= Chronological summary of the 2020 Summer Paralympics =

This is a chronological summary of the major events of the 2020 Summer Paralympics in Tokyo, Japan, which was postponed to 2021 due to the COVID-19 pandemic. The opening ceremony is scheduled on the 24th of August with the last day of competition and the closing ceremony on 5 September.

== Calendar ==
The preliminary schedule was announced on 19 October 2018. The finalized schedule was released on 13 August 2019.

The original schedule was from 25 August to 10 September 2020. To postpone the Paralympics until 2021, all events were delayed by 364 days (one day less than a full year to preserve the same days of the week), giving a new schedule of 24 August to 9 September 2021.

All times and dates use Japan Standard Time (UTC+9)

OC	Opening ceremony	●	Event competitions	1	Gold medal events	CC	Closing ceremony

August/September 2021		August								September					Events
August/September 2021		24th Tue	25th Wed	26th Thu	27th Fri	28th Sat	29th Sun	30th Mon	31st Tue	1st Wed	2nd Thu	3rd Fri	4th Sat	5th Sun	Events
Ceremonies		OC												CC	—N/a
Archery					●	1	1	2	2		1	1	1		9
Athletics					13	16	19	17	21	17	18	17	24	5	167
Badminton										●	●	●	7	7	14
Boccia						●	●	●	●	4	●	●	3		7
Cycling	Road								19	6	5	4			51
Cycling	Track		4	5	5	3									51
Equestrian (dressage)				3	2	●	1	5							11
Football 5-a-side							●	●	●		●		1		1
Goalball			●	●	●	●	●	●	●	●	●	2			2
Judo					4	4	5								13
Paracanoe											●	4	5		9
Paratriathlon						4	4								8
Powerlifting				4	4	4	4	4							20
Rowing					●	●	4								4
Shooting								3	2	2	1	2	2	1	13
Sitting volleyball					●	●	●	●	●	●	●	●	1	1	2
Swimming			16	14	14	14	13	15	14	15	15	16			146
Table tennis			●	●	●	5	8	8	●	●	5	5			31
Taekwondo											2	2	2		6
Wheelchair basketball			●	●	●	●	●	●	●	●	●	●	1	1	2
Wheelchair fencing			4	4	2	4	2								16
Wheelchair rugby			●	●	●	●	1								1
Wheelchair tennis					●	●	●	●	●	1	1	2	2		6
Daily medal events			24	30	44	55	62	54	58	45	48	55	49	15	539
Cumulative total			24	54	98	153	215	269	327	372	420	475	524	539	539
August/September 2021		24th Tue	25th Wed	26th Thu	27th Fri	28th Sat	29th Sun	30th Mon	31st Tue	1st Wed	2nd Thu	3rd Fri	4th Sat	5th Sun	Total events
August/September 2021		August								September					Total events

== Medal table ==
* Host nation (Japan)

2020 Summer Paralympics medal table
Rank	NPC	Gold	Silver	Bronze	Total
1	China	96	60	51	207
2	Great Britain	41	38	45	124
3	United States	37	36	31	104
4	RPC	36	33	49	118
5	Netherlands	25	17	17	59
6	Ukraine	24	47	27	98
7	Brazil	22	20	30	72
8	Australia	21	29	30	80
9	Italy	14	29	26	69
10	Azerbaijan	14	1	4	19
11–86	Remaining teams	209	230	279	718
Totals (86 entries)		539	540	589	1,668

== Day-by-day summaries ==
=== Day 0 — Tuesday 24 August ===
24 August 2021 — detailed results

Opening ceremony

- The opening ceremony was held at Japan National Stadium at 20:00 JST (UTC+9).

=== Day 1 — Wednesday 25 August ===
25 August 2021 — summary table

Sport	Event	Gold medalist(s)			Silver medalist(s)		Bronze medalist(s)		Ref
Sport	Event	Competitor(s)	Team	Rec	Competitor(s)	Team	Competitor(s)	Team	Ref
Cycling	Men's individual pursuit B	Tristan Bangma piloted by Patrick Bos	Netherlands		Steve Bate piloted by Adam Duggleby	Great Britain	Marcin Polak piloted by Michał Ładosz	Poland	
Cycling	Women's individual pursuit C1–3	Paige Greco	Australia	WR	Wang Xiaomei	China	Denise Schindler	Germany	
Cycling	Women's individual pursuit C4	Emily Petricola	Australia		Shawn Morelli	United States	Keely Shaw	Canada	
Cycling	Women's individual pursuit C5	Sarah Storey	Great Britain		Crystal Lane-Wright	Great Britain	Marie Patouillet	France	
Swimming	Men's 50 metre freestyle S10	Rowan Crothers	Australia		Maksym Krypak	Ukraine	Phelipe Rodrigues	Brazil	
Swimming	Women's 50 metre freestyle S6	Yelyzaveta Mereshko	Ukraine		Elizabeth Marks	United States	Anna Hontar	Ukraine	
Swimming	Women's 50 metre freestyle S10	Anastasiia Gontar	RPC		Chantalle Zijderveld	Netherlands	Aurélie Rivard	Canada	
Swimming	Men's 100 metre freestyle S8	Ben Popham	Australia		Andrei Nikolaev	RPC	Dimosthenis Michalentzakis	Greece	
Swimming	Men's 200 metre freestyle S5	Francesco Bocciardo	Italy	PR	Antoni Ponce Bertran	Spain	Daniel Dias	Brazil	
Swimming	Women's 200 metre freestyle S5	Zhang Li	China		Tully Kearney	Great Britain	Monica Boggioni	Italy	
Swimming	Men's 400 metre freestyle S9	William Martin	Australia	PR	Ugo Didier	France	Alexander Tuckfield	Australia	
Swimming	Women's 400 metre freestyle S9	Lakeisha Patterson	Australia		Zsófia Konkoly	Hungary	Toni Shaw	Great Britain	
Swimming	Men's 100 metre backstroke S1	Iyad Shalabi	Israel		Anton Kol	Ukraine	Francesco Bettella	Italy	
Swimming	Men's 100 metre backstroke S2	Alberto Abarza	Chile		Gabriel Geraldo Araújo	Brazil	Vladimir Danilenko	RPC	
Swimming	Women's 100 metre backstroke S2	Yip Pin Xiu	Singapore		Miyuki Yamada	Japan	Fabiola Ramírez	Mexico	
Swimming	Men's 50 metre breaststroke SB3	Roman Zhdanov	RPC	WR	Miguel Luque Ávila	Mexico	Tatayuki Suzuki	Japan	
Swimming	Men's 100 metre butterfly S13	Ihar Boki	Belarus	PR	Oleksii Virchenko	Ukraine	Islam Aslanov	Uzbekistan	
Swimming	Men's 100 metre butterfly S14	Gabriel Bandeira	Brazil	PR	Reece Dunn	Great Britain	Benjamin Hance	Australia	
Swimming	Women's 100 metre butterfly S13	Carlotta Gilli	Italy		Alessia Berra	Italy	Daria Pikalova	RPC	
Swimming	Women's 100 metre butterfly S14	Valeriia Shabalina	RPC	WR	Paige Leonhardt	Australia	Ruby Storm	Australia	
Wheelchair fencing	Men's sabre A	Li Hao	China		Artem Manko	Ukraine	Tian Jianquan	China	
Wheelchair fencing	Men's sabre B	Feng Yanke	China		Adrian Castro	Poland	Panagiotis Triantafyllou	Greece	
Wheelchair fencing	Women's sabre A	Bian Jing	China		Nino Tibilashvili	Georgia	Yevheniia Breus	Ukraine	
Wheelchair fencing	Women's sabre B	Tan Shumei	China		Olena Fedota	Ukraine	Xiao Rong	China	

=== Day 2 — Thursday 26 August ===
26 August 2021 — summary table

Sport	Event	Gold medalist(s)			Silver medalist(s)		Bronze medalist(s)		Ref
Sport	Event	Competitor(s)	Team	Rec	Competitor(s)	Team	Competitor(s)	Team	Ref
Cycling	Women's time trial B	Larissa Klaassen piloted by Imke Brommer	Netherlands	PR	Aileen McGlynn piloted by Helen Scott	Great Britain	Griet Hoet piloted by Anneleen Monsieur	Belgium	
Cycling	Men's time trial C4–5	Alfonso Cabello	Spain	WR	Jody Cundy	Great Britain	Jozef Metelka	Slovakia	
Cycling	Men's individual pursuit C1	Mikhail Astashov	RPC		Tristen Chernove	Canada	Li Zhangyu	China	
Cycling	Men's individual pursuit C2	Alexandre Léauté	France	WR	Darren Hicks	Australia	Liang Guihua	China	
Cycling	Men's individual pursuit C3	Jaco van Gass	Great Britain		Finlay Graham	Great Britain	David Nicholas	Australia	
Equestrian	Dressage Individual Test Grade II	Lee Pearson	Great Britain		Pepo Puch	Austria	Georgia Wilson	Great Britain	
Equestrian	Dressage Individual Test Grade IV	Sanne Voets	Netherlands		Rodolpho Riskalla	Brazil	Manon Claeys	Belgium	
Equestrian	Dressage Individual Test Grade V	Michèle George	Belgium		Sophie Wells	Great Britain	Frank Hosmar	Netherlands	
Powerlifting	Men's 49 kg	Omar Qarada	Jordan		Lê Văn Công	Vietnam	Parvin Mammadov	Azerbaijan	
Powerlifting	Men's 54 kg	David Degtyarev	Kazakhstan		Axel Bourlon	France	Dimitrios Bakochristos	Greece	
Powerlifting	Women's 41 kg	Guo Lingling	China	WR	Ni Nengah Widiasih	Indonesia	Clara Fuentes Monasterio	Venezuela	
Powerlifting	Women's 45 kg	Latifat Tijani	Nigeria		Cui Zhe	China	Justyna Kozdryk	Poland	
Swimming	Men's 100 metre freestyle S4	Takayuki Suzuki	Japan	PR	Luigi Beggiato	Italy	Roman Zhdanov	RPC	
Swimming	Men's 100 metre freestyle S5	Francesco Bocciardo	Italy		Wang Lichao	China	Daniel de Faria Dias	Brazil	

=== Day 3 — Friday 27 August ===
27 August 2021 — summary table

=== Day 4 — Saturday 28 August ===
28 August 2021 — summary table
