= Swimming at the 2020 Summer Paralympics – Men's 100 metre freestyle S10 =

Men's 100 metre freestyle S10 at the XVI Paralympic Games
- Venue: Tokyo Aquatics Centre
- Dates: 28 August 2021
- Competitors: 17 from 11 nations

Medalists
1st place, gold medalist(s)		Maksym Krypak	Ukraine
2nd place, silver medalist(s)		Rowan Crothers	Australia
3rd place, bronze medalist(s)		Stefano Raimondi	Italy

The men's 100 metre freestyle S10 event at the 2020 Paralympic Games took place on 28 August 2021, at the Tokyo Aquatics Centre. Ukraine's Maksym Krypak won the gold. The silver and bronze went to Australia's Rowan Cothers and Italy's Stefano Raimondi, respectively.

== Heats ==
The swimmers with the top eight times, regardless of heat, advanced to the final.

Rank	Heat	Lane	Name	Nationality	Time	Notes
1	2	4	Maksym Krypak	Ukraine	51.57	Q
2	3	4	Rowan Crothers	Australia	52.70	Q
3	1	4	Stefano Raimondi	Italy	52.39	Q
4	1	5	Thomas Gallagher	Australia	53.13	Q
5	3	5	Phelipe Rodrigues	Brazil	53.44	Q
6	2	5	Bas Takken	Netherlands	53.94	Q
7	3	6	Alan Ogorzalek	Poland	55.27	Q
8	3	3	Dmitrii Bartasinskii	RPC	55.31	Q
9	1	3	David Levecq	Spain	55.51	
10	2	3	Dmitry Grigoryev	RPC	55.55	
11	3	2	Riccardo Menciotti	Italy	56.29	
12	1	6	Ruan Souza	Brazil	56.88	
13	2	6	Justin Kaps	Germany	57.01	
14	1	2	Simone Ciulli	Italy	57.44	
15	2	2	Artem Isaev	RPC	57.62	
16	2	7	Jamal Hill	United States	57.70	
17	3	7	Akito Minai	Japan	58.44	

== Final ==
100m freestyle final
Rank	Lane	Name	Nationality	Time	Notes
1st place, gold medalist(s)	4	Maksym Krypak	Ukraine	50.64	WR
2nd place, silver medalist(s)	5	Rowan Crothers	Australia	51.37	
3rd place, bronze medalist(s)	3	Stefano Raimondi	Italy	51.45	
4	2	Phelipe Andrews Melo Rodrigues	Brazil	52.04	
5	6	Thomas Gallagher	Australia	53.14	
6	7	Bas Takken	Netherlands	54.06	
7	8	Dmitrii Bartasinskii	RPC	54.09	
8	1	Alan Ogorzalek	Poland	55.45	
