= Artur Yusupov =

Artur Yusupov may refer to:

- Artur Yusupov (chess player) (born 1960), Russian chess player
- Artur Yusupov (footballer) (born 1989), Russian football player
- Artur Yusupov (fencer) (born 1983), Russian wheelchair fencer
