= Wheelchair fencing at the 2020 Summer Paralympics =

Wheelchair fencing at the XVI Paralympic Games
- Wheelchair fencing pictogram of the 2020 Summer Paralympics
- Venue: Makuhari Messe
- Dates: 25–29 August 2021
- Competitors: 96 from 20 nations

Wheelchair fencing at the 2020 Summer Paralympics was held at the Makuhari Messe, the same place where goalball, sitting volleyball and taekwondo took place. It consisted of sixteen events (eight male, eight female) including two team events.

The 2020 Summer Olympic and Paralympic Games were postponed to 2021 due to the COVID-19 pandemic. They kept the 2020 name and were held from 24 August to 5 September 2021.

== Participating nations ==
- Belarus (2)
- Brazil (4)
- Canada (4)
- China (11)
- France (4)
- Georgia (3)
- Germany (2)
- Great Britain (4)
- Greece (2)
- Hong Kong (3)
- Hungary (7)
- Iraq (3)
- Italy (8)
- Japan (6) (Host nation)
- Poland (7)
- RPC (12)
- Thailand (1)
- Turkey (1)
- Ukraine (9)
- United States (3)

== Medal table ==
Rank	NPC	Gold	Silver	Bronze	Total
1	China	11	4	5	20
2	RPC	2	2	3	7
3	Great Britain	1	1	3	5
4	Hungary	1	1	1	3
5	Italy	1	1	0	2
6	Ukraine	0	4	1	5
7	Brazil	0	1	0	1
7	Georgia	0	1	0	1
7	Poland	0	1	0	1
10	France	0	0	1	1
10	Greece	0	0	1	1
10	Thailand	0	0	1	1
Totals (12 entries)		16	16	16	48

== Medalists ==
=== Men's events ===
Event	Class	Gold	Silver	Bronze
Individual épée	A	Piers Gilliver; Great Britain	Maxim Shaburov; RPC	Tian Jianquan; China
Individual épée	B	Alexander Kuzyukov; RPC	Jovane Guissone; Brazil	Dimitri Coutya; Great Britain
Team épée	A–B	RPC; Alexander Kuzyukov; Maxim Shaburov; Artur Yusupov	China; Hu Daoliang; Sun Gang; Tian Jianquan	Great Britain; Dimitri Coutya; Piers Gilliver; Oliver Lam-Watson
Individual foil	A	Sun Gang; China	Richárd Osváth; Hungary	Nikita Nagaev; RPC
Individual foil	B	Feng Yanke; China	Hu Daoliang; China	Dimitri Coutya; Great Britain
Team foil	A–B	China; Hu Daoliang; Li Hao; Sun Gang	Great Britain; Dimitri Coutya; Piers Gilliver; Oliver Lam-Watson	France; Romain Noble; Damien Tokatlian; Maxime Valet
Individual sabre	A	Li Hao; China	Artem Manko; Ukraine	Tian Jianquan; China
Individual sabre	B	Feng Yanke; China	Adrian Castro; Poland	Panagiotis Triantafyllou; Greece

=== Women's events ===
Event	Class	Gold	Silver	Bronze
Individual épée	A	Amarilla Veres; Hungary	Rong Jing; China	Bian Jing; China
Individual épée	B	Tan Shumei; China	Viktoria Boykova; RPC	Saysunee Jana; Thailand
Team épée	A–B	China; Bian Jing; Rong Jing; Tan Shumei	Ukraine; Yevheniia Breus; Olena Fedota; Nataliia Mandryk	RPC; Viktoria Boykova; Alena Evdokimova; Iuliia Maya
Individual foil	A	Gu Haiyan; China	Nataliia Morkvych; Ukraine	Rong Jing; China
Individual foil	B	Beatrice Vio; Italy	Zhou Jingjing; China	Ludmila Vasileva; RPC
Team foil	A–B	China; Gu Haiyan; Rong Jing; Zhou Jingjing	Italy; Andreea Mogoș; Loredana Trigilia; Beatrice Vio	Hungary; Gyongyi Dani; Éva Hajmási; Zsuzsanna Krajnyák
Individual sabre	A	Bian Jing; China	Nino Tibilashvili; Georgia	Yevheniia Breus; Ukraine
Individual sabre	B	Tan Shumei; China	Olena Fedota; Ukraine	Xiao Rong; China

== See also ==
- Fencing at the 2020 Summer Olympics
