= Swimming at the 2020 Summer Paralympics – Women's 100 metre breaststroke SB8 =

Women's 100 metre breaststroke SB8 at the XVI Paralympic Games
- Venue: Tokyo Aquatics Centre
- Dates: 26 August 2021
- Competitors: 15 from 12 nations

Medalists
1st place, gold medalist(s)		Ellen Keane	Ireland
2nd place, silver medalist(s)		Sophie Pascoe	New Zealand
3rd place, bronze medalist(s)		Adelina Razetdinova	RPC

The Women's 100 metre breaststroke SB8 event at the 2020 Paralympic Games took place on 26 August 2021, at the Tokyo Aquatics Centre.

== Heats ==
The swimmers with the top eight times, regardless of heat, advanced to the final.

Rank	Heat	Lane	Name	Nationality	Time	Notes
1	2	5	Ellen Keane	Ireland	1:21.71	Q
2	2	4	Sophie Pascoe	New Zealand	1:21.75	Q
3	1	5	Adelina Razetdinova	RPC	1:26.29	Q
4	2	6	Nuria Marqués Soto	Spain	1:26.41	Q
5	1	4	Katarina Roxon	Canada	1:26.62	Q
6	1	6	Mikuni Utsugi	Japan	1:28.44	Q
7	2	2	Efthymia Gkouli	Greece	1:31.55	Q
8	1	3	Elena Kliachkina	RPC	1:31.60	Q
9	2	7	Paula Novina	Croatia	1:31.62	
10	2	1	Hannah Aspden	United States	1:32.40	
11	1	2	Meimei White	United States	1:32.84	
12	1	1	Husnah Kukundakwe	Uganda	1:34.35	
13	1	7	Camila Haase	Costa Rica	1:35.36	
14	2	8	Nye Cruickshank	Grenada	2:22.12	
	2	3	Viktoriia Ishchiulova	RPC	DNS	

== Final ==
100m breaststroke final
Rank	Lane	Name	Nationality	Time	Notes
1st place, gold medalist(s)	4	Ellen Keane	Ireland	1:19.93	
2nd place, silver medalist(s)	5	Sophie Pascoe	New Zealand	1:20.32	
3rd place, bronze medalist(s)	3	Adelina Razetdinova	RPC	1:24.77	
4	2	Katarina Roxon	Canada	1:25.73	
5	6	Nuria Marqués Soto	Spain	1:26.53	
6	7	Mikuni Utsugi	Japan	1:28.59	
7	8	Elena Kliachkina	RPC	1:29.72	
8	1	Efthymia Gkouli	Greece	1:31.57	
