= Shaburov =

Shaburov (Russian: Шабуров) is a Russian masculine surname, its feminine counterpart is Shaburova. The surname may refer to the following notable people:

- Maxim Shaburov (born 1996), Russian wheelchair fencer
- Victor Shaburov (born 1977), Cypriot Russian entrepreneur
