= Powerlifting at the 2020 Summer Paralympics – Women's 79 kg =

Powerlifting – Women's 7 kg at the XVI Paralympic Games
- Venue: Tokyo International Forum
- Date: 29 August 2021
- Competitors: 8 from 8 nations

Medalists
1st place, gold medalist(s)		Bose Omolayo	Nigeria
2nd place, silver medalist(s)		Nataliia Oliinyk	Ukraine
3rd place, bronze medalist(s)		Vera Muratova	RPC

The women's 79 kg powerlifting event at the 2020 Summer Paralympics was contested on 29 August at Tokyo International Forum.

== Records ==
There are twenty powerlifting events, corresponding to ten weight classes each for men and women. Prior to this competition, the existing world and Paralympic records were as follows.

World Record	Vera Muratova (RUS)	143 kg	Dubai, United Arab Emirates	22 June 2021
Paralympic Record	Bose Omolayo (NGR)	138 kg	Rio de Janeiro, Brazil	12 September 2016

== Results ==
Rank	Name	Body weight (kg)	Attempts (kg)				Result (kg)
Rank	Name	Body weight (kg)	1	2	3	4	Result (kg)
1st place, gold medalist(s)	Bose Omolayo (NGR)	76.69	135	138	141 PR	~~144~~	141
2nd place, silver medalist(s)	Nataliia Oliinyk (UKR)	78.59	125	130	133	–	133
3rd place, bronze medalist(s)	Vera Muratova (RPC)	78.21	132	~~136~~	~~138~~	–	132
4	Asma Issa (JOR)	76.66	~~112~~	115	~~118~~	–	115
5	Sanae Soubane (MAR)	77.21	~~110~~	~~110~~	111	–	111
6	Gehan Hassan (EGY)	78.02	104	110	~~112~~	–	110
7	Maria Montserrat Alcoba Membrilla (ESP)	77.03	103	107	~~110~~	–	107
8	Chika Sakamoto (JPN)	78.49	72	77	~~80~~	–	77
