= Thomas Gallagher (swimmer) =

Australian Paralympic swimmer

Thomas Gallagher OAM
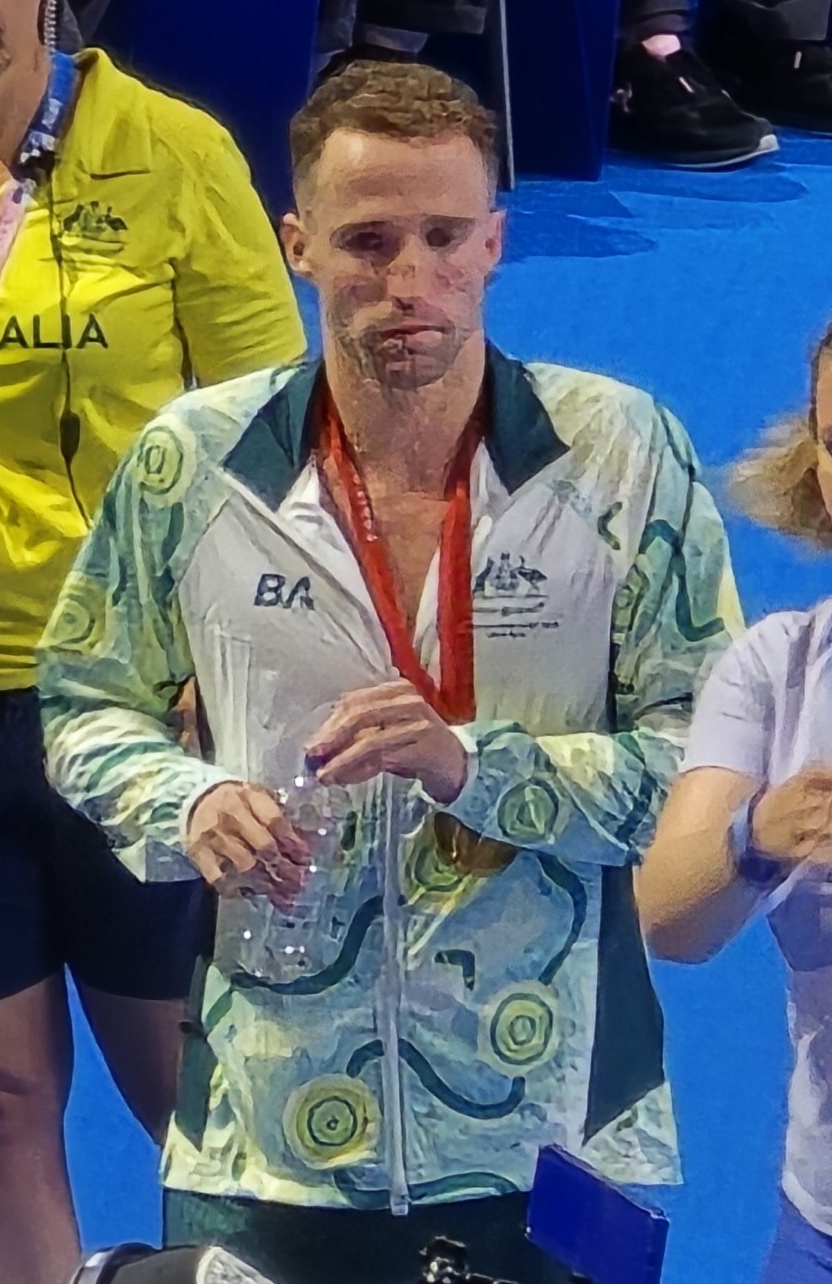
- Thomas Gallagher with his gold medal on August 29, 2024

Personal information
- Nationality: Australian
- Born: 20 May 1999 (age 27) Cardiff, South Wales

Sport
- Country: Australia
- Sport: Paralympic swimming Surf life saving
- Disability class: S10
- Club: Somerset SC (Gold Coast)
- Coached by: Ashley Callus
Medal record
Men's Paralympic swimming
Representing Australia
Paralympic Games
Gold medal – first place	2024 Paris	50 m freestyle S10
Bronze medal – third place	2020 Tokyo	400 m freestyle S10
Bronze medal – third place	2024 Paris	100 m freestyle S10
Bronze medal – third place	2024 Paris	100 m backstroke S10
World Championships
Silver medal – second place	2023 Manchester	50 m freestyle S10
Silver medal – second place	2025 Singapore	50 m freestyle S10
Silver medal – second place	2025 Singapore	100 m backstroke S10
Bronze medal – third place	2023 Manchester	100 m freestyle S10
Bronze medal – third place	2025 Singapore	Mixed 4×100 m medley relay 34pts

Thomas "Tom" James Gallagher OAM (born 20 May 1999) is an Australian Paralympic swimmer and surf life saver. He represented Australia at the 2020 Tokyo Paralympics, winning a bronze medal and the 2024 Paris Paralympics, winning one gold and two bronze medal

== Personal ==
Gallagher was born and grew up in Perth, Western Australia. He has cerebral palsy and suffers from bouts of pancreatitis. In 2019, he moved to the Gold Coast, Queensland, to further his surf life saving career. As of 2021, he is undertaking a Bachelor of Business at Griffith University and he has been awarded a Full Sporting Blue.

== Swimming career ==
Gallagher is classified as a S10 swimmer.

At the 2020 Tokyo Paralympics, Gallagher won the bronze medal in the Men's 400 m freestyle S10 and finished fifth in both Men's 50 m freestyle S10 and Men's 100 m freestyle S10. At the 2021 Australian Multi-Class Swimming Championship, he won the gold medal in the Men's 400m Freestyle Multi-Class in a time of 4:10.17 (997 points), defeating reigning Paralympic champion Brenden Hall.

At the 2023 World Para Swimming Championships, Manchester, England, Gallagher won two medals in sprint freestyle S10 events.

At the 2024 Paris Paralympics, he won the gold medal in the Men's 50 m freestyle S10 and bronze medals in Men's 100 m freestyle S10 and Men's 100 m backstroke S10. At the 2025 World Para Swimming Championships in Singapore, he won two silver medals - Men's 50 m Freestyle S10 Men's and Men's 100 m backstroke S10 and the bronze medal in the Mixed 4 x 100 m Medley Relay 34pts.

In 2024, he is coached by Ashley Callus at Somerset SC on the Gold Coast.

== Surf life saving ==
Gallagher took up surf life saving in Perth, Western Australia and represented the City of Perth. In 2019, he moved to the Gold Coast, Queensland, to train under surf life saving coach Michael King and represents Currumbin Vikings. His achievements include: 1st Open and U19 ironman WA 2018, 1st U19 board relay Aussies 2018, 3rd U19 ironman Aussies 2018, 1st Open Short Course Coolangatta Gold 2018, Dean Mercery Memorial Trophy Winning 2019 and SOS Surf Race Winner 2020.

== Recognition ==
- 2025 - Medal of the Order of Australia (OAM) for service to sport as a gold medallist at the Paris Paralympic Games 2024.
