= Vera Muratova =

Russian Paralympic powerlifter

Personal information
- Born: 3 July 1980 (age 45) Samarkand, Uzbekistan

Sport
- Country: Russia
- Sport: Paralympic powerlifting
Medal record
Paralympic Games
Bronze medal – third place	2020 Tokyo	79 kg
World Championships
Silver medal – second place	2021 Tbilisi	79 kg
Bronze medal – third place	2014 Dubai	73 kg
Bronze medal – third place	2019 Nur-Sultan	86 kg

Vera Georgievna Muratova (Russian: Вера Георгиевна Муратова; born 3 July 1980) is a Russian Paralympic powerlifter. She won the bronze medal in the women's 79 kg event at the 2020 Summer Paralympics held in Tokyo, Japan. A few months later, Muratova won the silver medal in her event at the 2021 World Para Powerlifting Championships held in Tbilisi, Georgia.

== Career ==
Muratova finished in 4th place in the women's 67.5 kg event at the 2012 Summer Paralympics held in London, United Kingdom. She represented Russia at the 2012 Summer Paralympics and she competed at the 2020 Summer Paralympics under the flag of the Russian Paralympic Committee.

In 2014, Muratova won the bronze medal in her event at the IPC Powerlifting World Championships held in Dubai, United Arab Emirates. At the 2019 World Para Powerlifting Championships held in Nur-Sultan, Kazakhstan, she won the bronze medal in the women's 86 kg event. In June 2021, she won the gold medal in her event with a new world record of 143 kg at the 2021 World Para Powerlifting World Cup event held in Dubai, United Arab Emirates.

== Achievements ==
Year	Venue	Weight	Attempts (kg)			Total	Rank
Year	Venue	Weight	1	2	3	Total	Rank
Summer Paralympics
2012	London, United Kingdom	67.5 kg	107	111	~~116~~	111	4
2021	Tokyo, Japan	79 kg	132	~~136~~	~~138~~	132	3rd place, bronze medalist(s)
