= Dmitrii Cherniaev =

Russian Paralympic swimmer

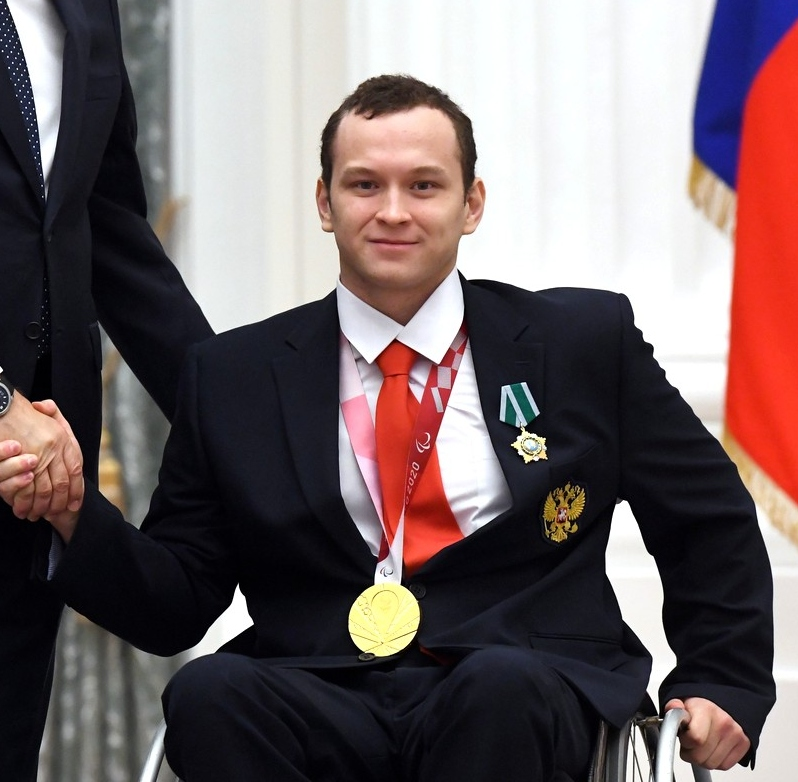
- Cherniaev in 2021

Personal information
- Native name: Дмитрий Черняев
- Full name: Dmitrii Gennadiyevich Cherniaev
- Nationality: Russian
- Born: 14 February 2000 (age 26) Chelyabinsk, Russia

Sport
- Sport: Paralympic swimming
- Disability class: S5, SB4
Medal record
Representing RPC
Paralympic Games
Gold medal – first place	2020 Tokyo	100 m breaststroke SB4
Representing Russia
World Championships
Gold medal – first place	2019 London	100 m breaststroke SB4
European Championships
Gold medal – first place	2020 Funchal	100 m breaststroke SB4
Gold medal – first place	2026 Kocaeli	100 m breaststroke SB4
Representing Neutral Paralympic Athletes
Paralympic Games
Gold medal – first place	2024 Paris	100 m breaststroke SB4
World Championships
Gold medal – first place	2025 Singapore	100 m breaststroke SB4
Bronze medal – third place	2025 Singapore	200 m ind. medley SM5
European Championships
Gold medal – first place	2024 Funchal	100 m breaststroke SB4

Dmitrii Gennadiyevich Cherniaev (Russian: Дмитрий Геннадьевич Черняев; born 14 February 2000) is a Russian Paralympic swimmer. He is a Paralympic, World and a European champion.

== Career ==
Cherniaev represented Russian Paralympic Committee athletes at the 2020 Summer Paralympics in the men's 100 metre breaststroke SB4 event and won a gold medal.
