= Ludmila Vasileva =

Russian wheelchair fencer

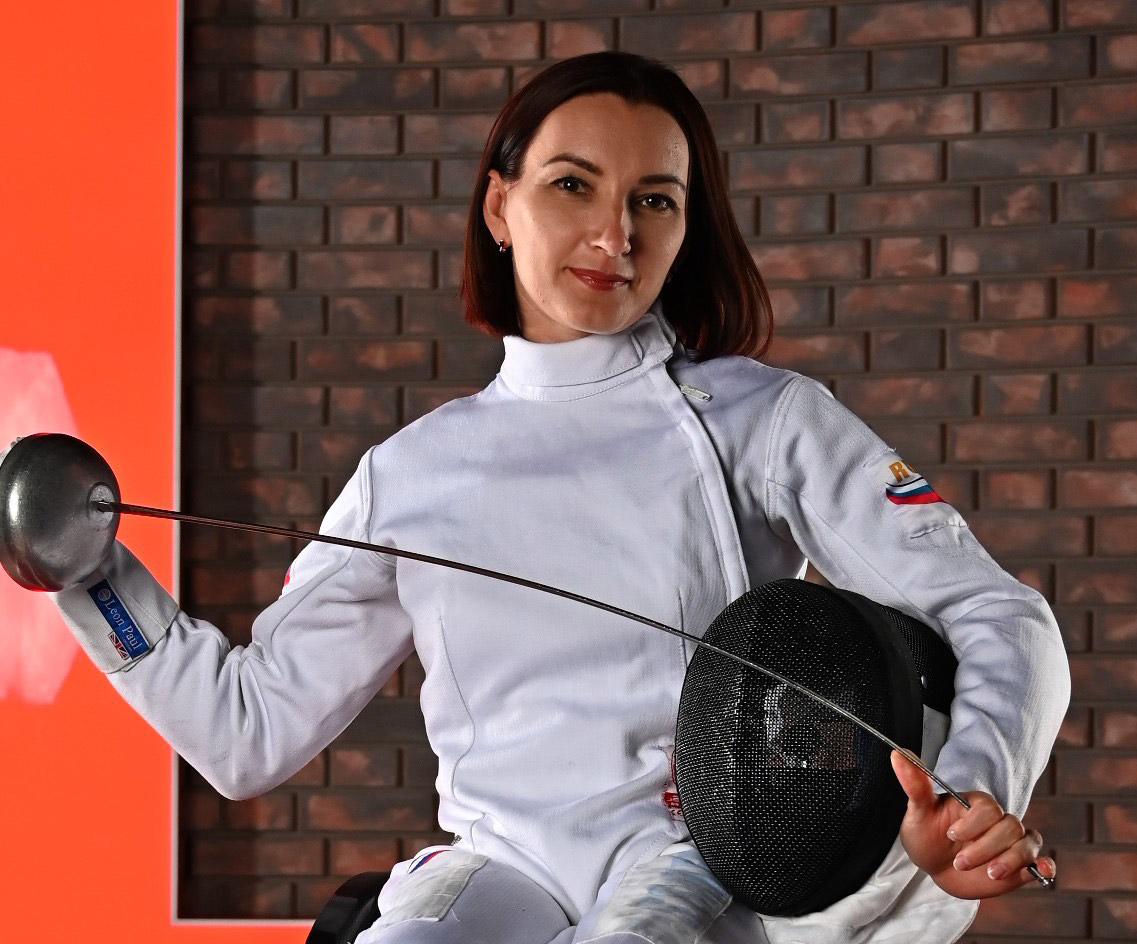

Personal information
- Born: 18 October 1984 (age 41) Belozersk, Soviet Union

Sport
- Country: Russia
- Sport: Wheelchair fencing
Medal record
Event	1st	2nd	3rd
Paralympic Games	0	0	1
World Championships	1	4	2
European Championships	4	1	5
Total	5	5	8
Paralympic Games
Bronze medal – third place	2020 Tokyo	Foil B

Ludmila Vasileva (born 18 October 1984 in Belozersk, Soviet Union) is a Russian wheelchair fencer. She fences in the foil and épée in category B. Ludmila is a four-time European champion, world champion, and bronze medalist at the 2020 Summer Paralympics Games in Tokyo (Japan). She competes under the flag of the Russian Paralympic Committee.

== Early life ==
At age three, she stopped walking because of a spinal cord cyst (spina bifida). All efforts of doctors didn't give any results. But the girl did not give up and began to fight for real life: she graduated from a music school and sang as part of the World Children's Choir of Disabled Children under the auspices of UNESCO. Ludmila even went on stage with outstanding opera artists like Montserrat Caballe, Maria Guleghina, in the Vatican City, and others.

From 2003 to 2008, she studied at the Moscow State Social and Humanitarian Institute for people with musculoskeletal disorders.

== Career ==
Soon Ludmila decided to try her hand at sports. In 2005, she began to engage in fencing in a wheelchair. In 2006, she became the first Russian athlete to represent Russia at international Paralympic fencing competitions. She received the first international awards in her country - bronze medals in individual foil and épée competitions.

She received the 2016 World Cup in épée and was recognized as the best athlete of the year by the International Wheelchair and Amputee Sports Federation (IWAS).

Ludmila especially proved herself at the International Wheelchair Fencing World Championships in 2018 in Kyoto (Japan), defeating the Italian world champion and Beatrice Vio in a duel. This was also Vasileva's first foil victory at the IWAS wheelchair fencing competition.

The highest achievement in sports is the bronze medal at the Tokyo 2020 Summer Paralympics Games, which took place in 2021, in women's wheelchair fencing in category B on foil.

== Personal life ==
From 2004 to 2015 Ludmila was married to Elizar Suslov, manager of the Russian national athletics team for persons with Loss Human musculoskeletal system, from whom she gave birth to a daughter in 2010.
