= Swimming at the 2020 Summer Paralympics – Men's 100 metre breaststroke SB9 =

Men's 100 metre breaststroke SB9 at the XVI Paralympic Games
- Venue: Tokyo Aquatics Centre
- Dates: 26 August 2021
- Competitors: 8 from 6 nations

Medalists
1st place, gold medalist(s)		Stefano Raimondi	Italy
2nd place, silver medalist(s)		Artem Isaev	RPC
3rd place, bronze medalist(s)		Dmitrii Bartasinskii	RPC

The men's 100 metre breaststroke SB9 event at the 2020 Paralympic Games took place on 26 August 2021, at the Tokyo Aquatics Centre.

== Final ==
100m breaststroke final
Rank	Lane	Name	Nationality	Time	Notes
1st place, gold medalist(s)	4	Stefano Raimondi	Italy	1:05.35	
2nd place, silver medalist(s)	5	Artem Isaev	RPC	1:07.45	
3rd place, bronze medalist(s)	6	Dmitrii Bartasinskii	RPC	1:08.06	
4	8	Dmitry Grigoryev	RPC	1:08.56	
5	7	Ruan Felipe Lima de Souza	Brazil	1:10.99	
6	3	James Leroux	Canada	1:11.49	
7	1	Tadeas Strasik	Czech Republic	1:13.19	
8	2	Fredrik Solberg	Norway	1:14.05	
