= Nikita Nagaev =

Russian wheelchair fencer

Personal information
- Born: 27 September 1993 (age 32) Ufa, Russia

Sport
- Country: Russia
- Sport: Wheelchair fencing
Medal record
Paralympic Games
Bronze medal – third place	2020 Tokyo	Foil A

Nikita Nagaev (born 27 September 1993) is a Russian wheelchair fencer. He won the bronze medal in the men's foil A event at the 2020 Summer Paralympics held in Tokyo, Japan. He competed at the Summer Paralympics under the flag of the Russian Paralympic Committee.
