= 2020 World Para Swimming European Open Championships – Men's 100 metre breaststroke =

The men's 100m breaststroke events held at the 2020 World Para Swimming European Championships were held at the Penteada Olympic Pools Complex.

== Medalists ==
Event	Gold	Silver	Bronze
SB4	Dmitrii Cherniaev; Russia	Francesco Bocciardo; Italy	Antonios Tsapatakis; Greece
SB5	Antoni Ponce Bertran; Spain	Andrei Granichka; Russia	Iurii Luchkin; Russia
SB6	Yevhenii Bohodaiko; Ukraine	Mark Malyar; Israel	Bence Ivan; Hungary
SB7	Egor Efrosinin; Russia	Bohdan Hrynenko; Ukraine	Tobias Pollap; Germany
SB8	Andrei Kalina; Russia	Vicente Enrique Almonacid Heyl; Chile	Oscar Salguero Galisteo; Spain
SB9	Stefano Raimondi; Italy	Artem Isaev; Russia	Dmitrii Bartasinskii; Russia
SB11	Edgaras Matakas; Lithuania	Viktor Smyrnov; Ukraine	Mykhailo Serbin; Ukraine
SB12	Vali Israfilov; Azerbaijan	Oleksii Fedyna; Ukraine	Uladzimir Izotau; Belarus
SB13	Taliso Engel; Germany	Ihar Boki; Belarus	Maksim Nikiforov; Russia
SB14	Gabriel Bandeira; Brazil	Joao Pedro Brutos de Oliveira; Brazil	Vasyl Krainyk; Ukraine

== Results ==
=== SB4 ===
Final

Rank	Name	Nationality	Time	Notes
1st place, gold medalist(s)	Dmitrii Cherniaev	Russia	1:45.84	
2nd place, silver medalist(s)	Francesco Bocciardo	Italy	1:50.05	
3rd place, bronze medalist(s)	Antonios Tsapatakis	Greece	1:52.00	
4	Stephan Fuhrer	Switzerland	1:57.00	
5	Konstantinos Karaouzas	Greece	2:02.80	
6	Bashar Halabi	Israel	2:03.89	

=== SB9 ===
Heats

Rank	Heat	Name	Nationality	Time	Notes
1	2	Artem Isaev	Russia	1:09.33	Q
2	2	Stefano Raimondi	Italy	1:09.60	Q
3	2	Fredrik Solberg	Norway	1:10.98	Q
4	1	Tadeas Strasik	Czech Republic	1:12.95	Q
5	1	Dmitrii Bartasinskii	Russia	1:13.52	Q
6	2	Rafal Kalinowski	Poland	1:13.77	Q
7	1	Ariel Enrique Schrenck Martinez	Spain	1:14.84	Q
8	1	Ugo Didier	France	1:16.51	Q
9	1	Leo Lahteenmaki	Finland	1:17.52	
10	2	Tamas Toth	Hungary	1:17.70	
11	2	Alan Ogorzalek	Poland	1:19.25	
12	1	Dmitry Grigoryev	Russia	1:21.03	
13	2	Justin Kaps	Germany	1:22.55	

Final

Rank	Name	Nationality	Time	Notes
1st place, gold medalist(s)	Stefano Raimondi	Italy	1:06.80	
2nd place, silver medalist(s)	Artem Isaev	Russia	1:08.51	
3rd place, bronze medalist(s)	Dmitrii Bartasinskii	Russia	1:09.96	
4	Fredrik Solberg	Norway	1:10.78	
5	Tadeas Strasik	Czech Republic	1:11.38	
6	Rafal Kalinowski	Poland	1:13.67	
7	Ariel Enrique Schrenck Martinez	Spain	1:14.88	
8	Ugo Didier	France	1:15.90	
