= Swimming at the 2020 Summer Paralympics – Men's 50 metre freestyle S10 =

Men's 50 metre freestyle S10 at the XVI Paralympic Games
- Venue: Tokyo Aquatics Centre
- Dates: 25 August 2021
- Competitors: 11 from 8 nations

Medalists
1st place, gold medalist(s)		Rowan Crothers	Australia
2nd place, silver medalist(s)		Maksym Krypak	Ukraine
3rd place, bronze medalist(s)		Phelipe Rodrigues	Brazil

The Men's 50 metre freestyle S10 event at the 2020 Paralympic Games took place on 25 August 2021, at the Tokyo Aquatics Centre.

== Heats ==
The swimmers with the top eight times, regardless of heat, advanced to the final.

Rank	Heat	Lane	Name	Nationality	Time	Notes
1	1	4	Rowan Crothers	Australia	23.25	Q
2	2	4	Maksym Krypak	Ukraine	23.58	Q
3	2	5	Phelipe Rodrigues	Brazil	23.74	Q
4	1	5	Stefano Raimondi	Italy	23.89	Q
5	2	3	Thomas Gallagher	Australia	24.29	Q
6	2	6	Dmitrii Bartasinskii	RPC	24.77	Q
7	1	3	Dmitry Grigoryev	RPC	24.85	Q
8	1	6	David Levecq	Spain	25.00	Q
9	2	2	Alexander Elliot	Canada	25.22	
10	1	2	Querijn Hensen	Netherlands	25.58	
11	2	7	Riccardo Menciotti	Italy	25.59	

== Final ==
The final took place on 25 August 2021, at 19:06:

50m freestyle final
Rank	Lane	Name	Nationality	Time	Notes
1st place, gold medalist(s)	4	Rowan Crothers	Australia	23.21	
2nd place, silver medalist(s)	5	Maksym Krypak	Ukraine	23.33	
3rd place, bronze medalist(s)	3	Phelipe Rodrigues	Brazil	23.50	
4	6	Stefano Raimondi	Italy	23.74	
5	2	Thomas Gallagher	Australia	24.16	
6	7	Dmitrii Bartasinskii	RPC	24.48	
7	1	Dmitry Drigoryev	RPC	24.61	
8	8	David Levecq	Spain	25.08	
