= Artem Isaev =

Russian Paralympic swimmer (born 1996)

Personal information
- Nationality: Russian
- Born: 18 April 1996 (age 30) Nizhnekamsk, Russia

Sport
- Sport: Paralympic swimming
- Disability class: S10, SB9, SM10
- Club: Meteor Sports School of Olympic Reserve
- Coached by: Alexander Kholoimov; Yekaterina Kholoimova
Medal record
Paralympic swimming
Representing RPC
Paralympic Games
Silver medal – second place	2020 Tokyo	100 m breaststroke SB9
Representing Russia
European Championships
Silver medal – second place	2020 Funchal	100 m breaststroke SB9
Silver medal – second place	2026 Kocaeli	100 m breaststroke SB9
Representing Neutral Paralympic Athletes
World Championships
Silver medal – second place	2025 Singapore	100 m breaststroke SB9
European Championships
Bronze medal – third place	2024 Funchal	100 m breaststroke SB9
Bronze medal – third place	2024 Funchal	200 m ind. medley SM10

Artem Isaev (born 18 April 1996) is a Russian Paralympic swimmer who represented Russian Paralympic Committee athletes at the 2020 Summer Paralympics.

== Career ==
Isaev represented Russian Paralympic Committee athletes at the 2020 Summer Paralympics in the men's 100 metre breaststroke SB9 and won a silver medal.
