= Andrei Pranevich =

Belarusian wheelchair fencer

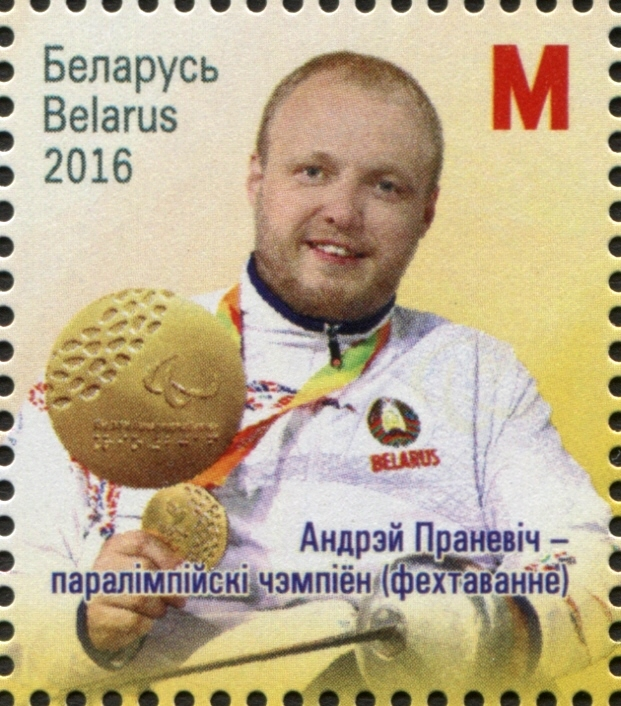
- Pranevich on a 2016 Belarus stamp

Sport
- Country: Belarus
- Sport: Wheelchair fencing
Medal record
Paralympic Games
| Gold medal – first place | 2016 Rio de Janeiro | Épée B |

Andrei Pranevich is a Belarusian wheelchair fencer. He represented Belarus at the 2016 Summer Paralympics held in Rio de Janeiro, Brazil and he won the gold medal in the men's épée B event.
