= Nataliia Mandryk =

Ukrainian wheelchair fencer

Personal information
- Nationality: Ukrainian
- Born: 15 January 1988 (age 38)

Sport
- Country: Ukraine
- Sport: Wheelchair fencing
Medal record
Paralympic Games
Silver medal – second place	2020 Tokyo	Épée team

Nataliia Mandryk (born 15 January 1988) is a Ukrainian wheelchair fencer.

Mandryk competed at the 2020 Summer Paralympics where she won a silver medal in the épée team event.
