= Alena Evdokimova =

Russian wheelchair fencer

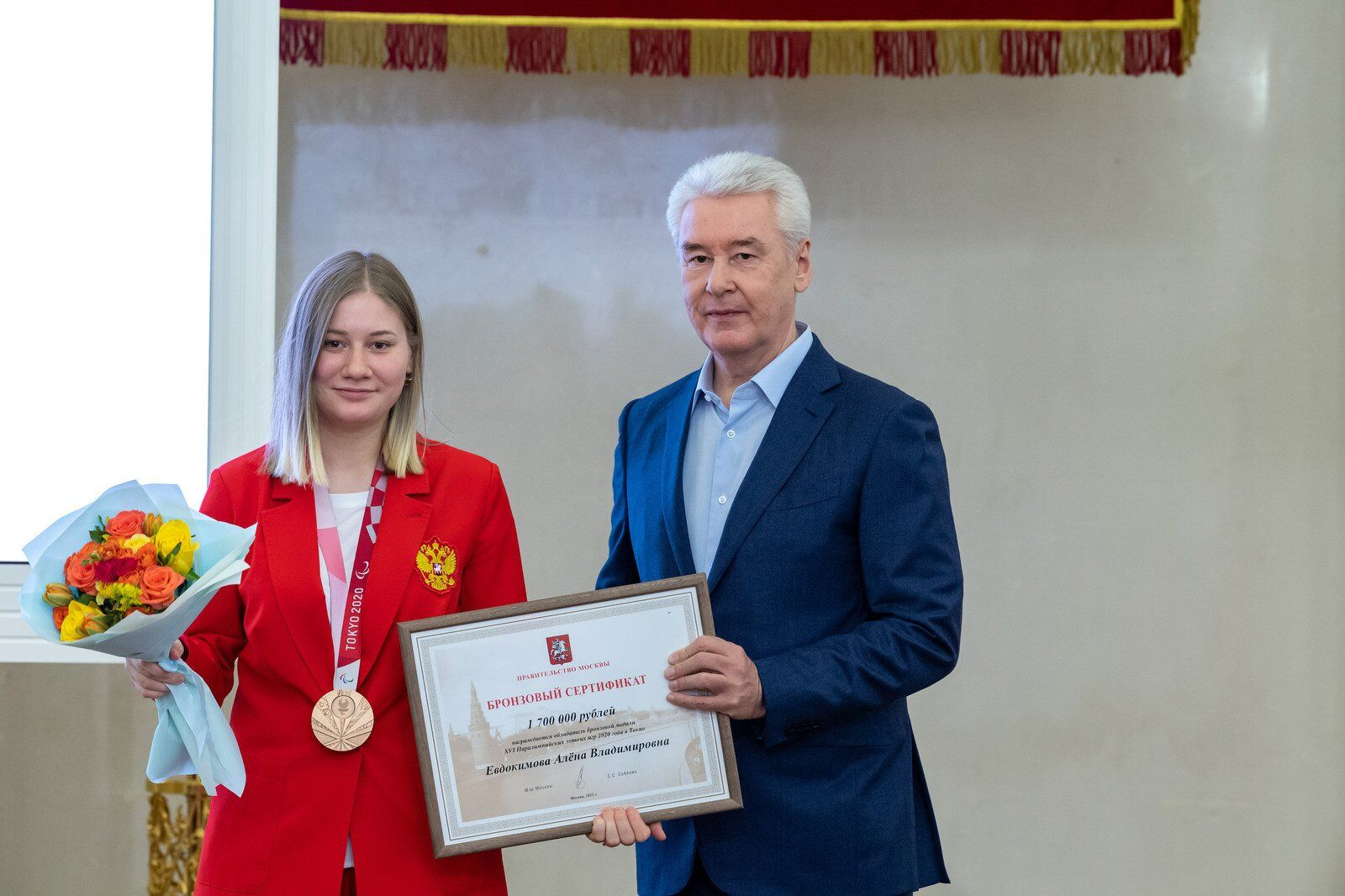

Medal record

Representing RPC

Wheelchair fencing

Paralympic Games
Bronze medal – third place	2020 Tokyo	Women's épée B

Alena Evdokimova is a Russian wheelchair fencer, who won bronze in the women's épée B event at the 2020 Summer Paralympics.

She competed at the 2016 IWAS Under-17 and Under-23 Wheelchair Fencing World Championships, winning a gold medal.
