= Artur Yusupov (fencer) =

Russian wheelchair fencer

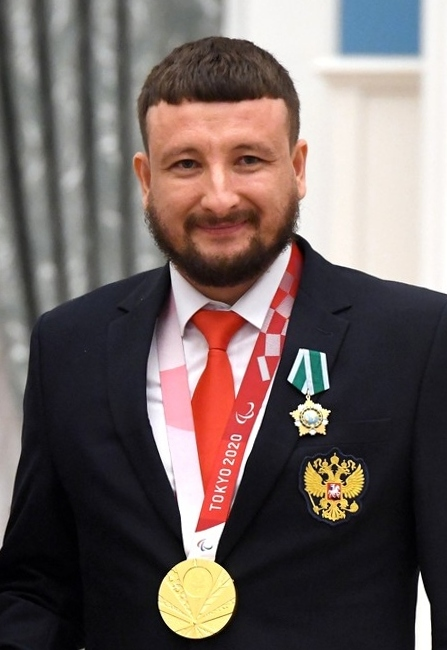
- Yusupov in 2021

Personal information
- Born: 20 December 1983 (age 42) Russia

Sport
- Country: Russia
- Sport: Wheelchair fencing
- Coached by: Dmitry Telegin
Medal record
Representing RPC
Paralympic Games
Gold medal – first place	2020 Tokyo	Épée team

Artur Yusupov (Russian: Артур Юсупов, born 20 December 1983) is a Russian wheelchair fencer. He won a gold medal in the team épée event at the 2020 Summer Paralympics and placed fifth individually. Between 2011 and 2019 he won two gold, four silver and seven bronze medals in épée and foil events at the world championships.

Yusupov lost his leg in 1999. He first trained in sitting volleyball, before changing to wheelchair fencing in 2002. He is married to Ekaterina Yusupova; they have three daughters: Elizaveta, Eseniya and Eva.
