= Viktoria Boykova =

Russian wheelchair fencer

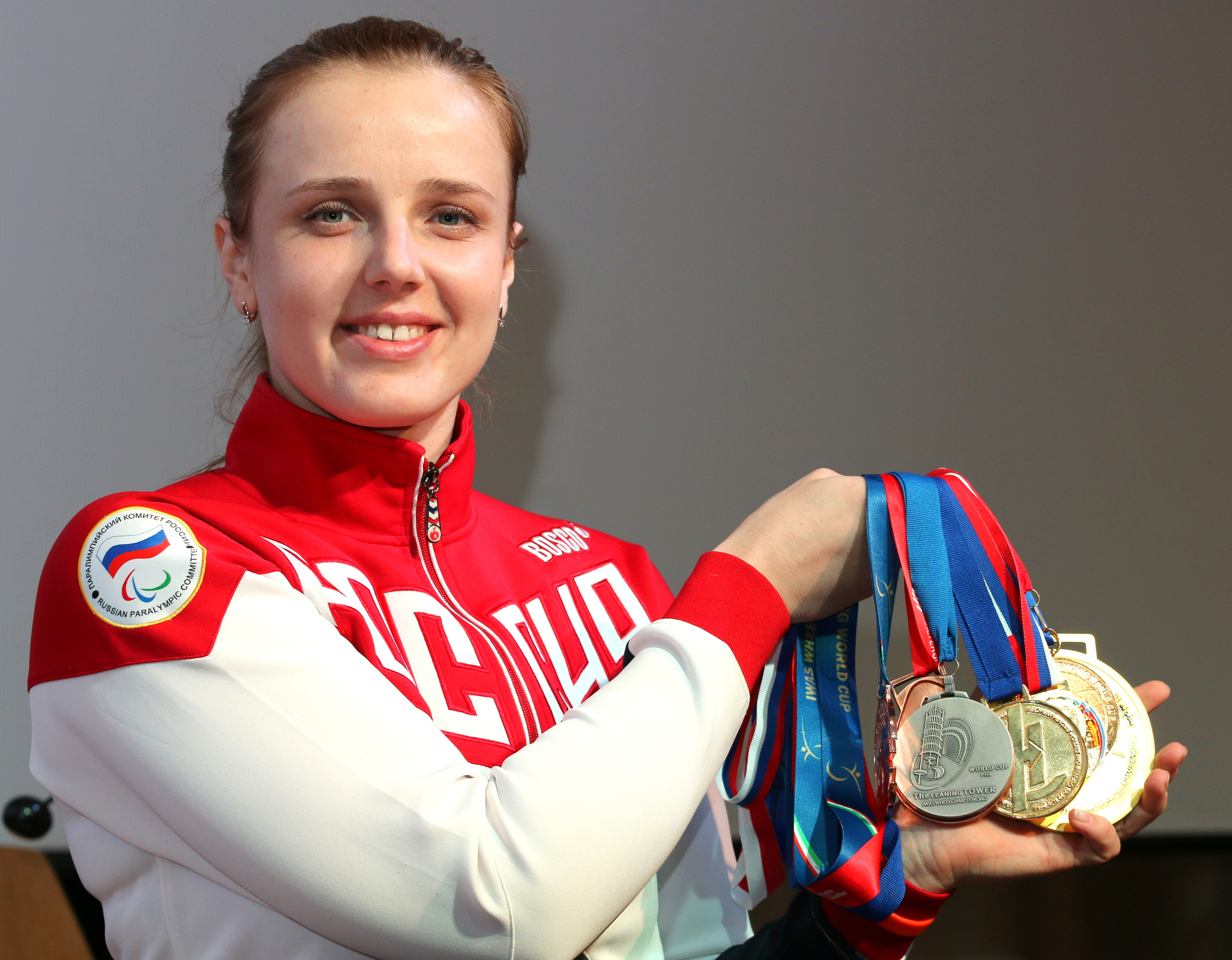

Medal record

Wheelchair fencing

Representing RPC

Paralympic Games
Silver medal – second place	2020 Tokyo	Women's épée B

Viktoria Boykova (born 5 January 1989) is a Russian wheelchair fencer, who won silver in the women's épée B event at the 2020 Summer Paralympics.
