= Maxim Shaburov =

Russian wheelchair fencer

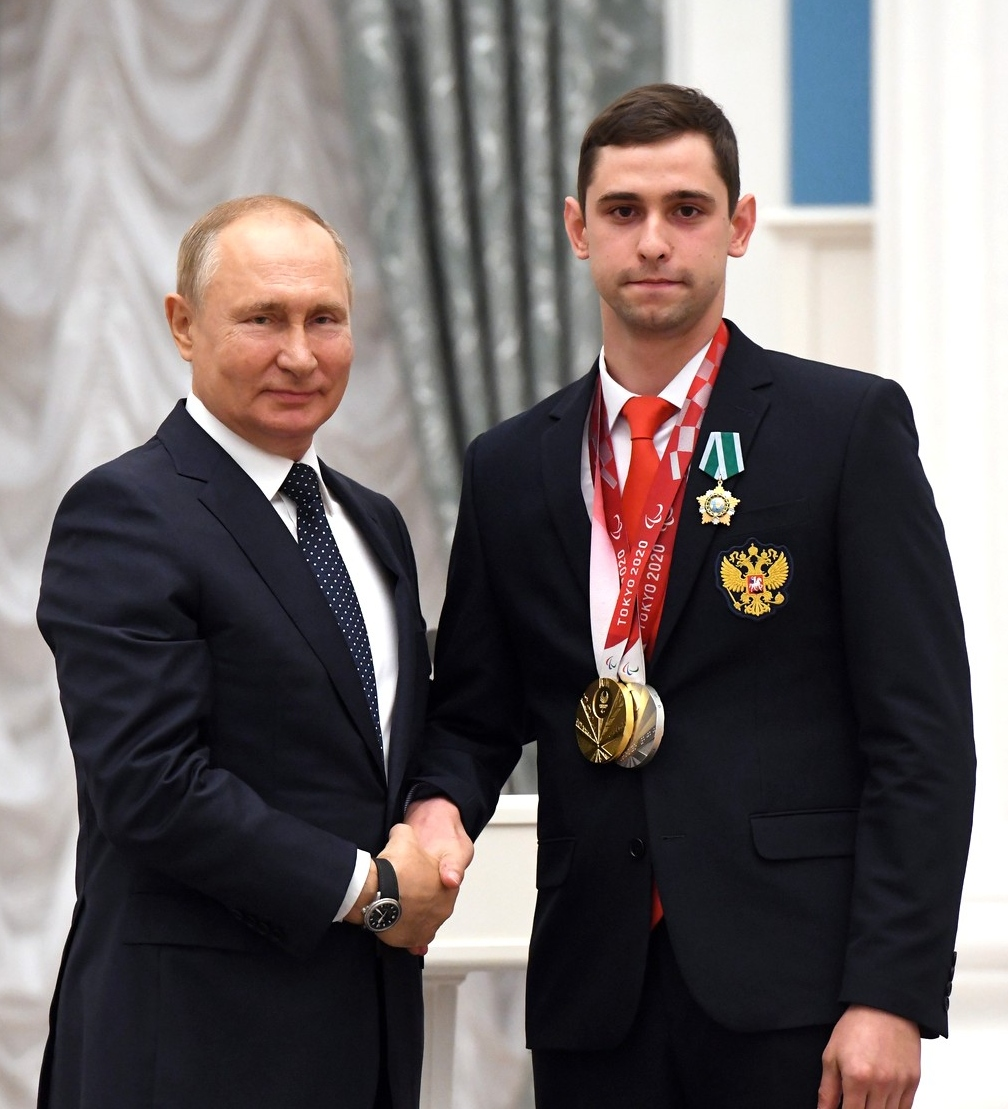
- Vladimir Putin and Shaburov in 2021

Personal information
- Native name: Максим Андреевич Шабуров
- Full name: Maxim Andreyevich Shaburov
- Born: 24 January 1996 (age 30) Novosibirsk, Russia

Fencing career
- Sport: Fencing
- Personal coach: Murat Konurbaev
- Disability class: A
Medal record
Men's wheelchair fencing
Representing RPC
Paralympic Games
| Gold medal – first place | 2020 Tokyo | Team épée A–B |
| Silver medal – second place | 2020 Tokyo | Individual épée A |

Maxim Andreyevich Shaburov (Russian: Максим Андреевич Шабуров; born 24 January 1996) is a Russian wheelchair fencer, who won gold in the épée team and silver in the épée A event at the 2020 Summer Paralympics.

Shaburov has cerebral palsy. He trained in table tennis for six years before changing to fencing at the age of 14.
