= Iuliia Maya =

Russian wheelchair fencer

Medal record

Representing RPC

Wheelchair fencing

Paralympic Games
Bronze medal – third place	2020 Tokyo	Women's épée team

Iuliia Maya is a Russian wheelchair fencer who won bronze in the women's épée team event at the 2020 Summer Paralympics.
