= Tan Shumei =

Chinese wheelchair fencer

Personal information
- Born: 24 August 1989 (age 36)

Sport
- Country: China
- Sport: Wheelchair fencing
Medal record
Paralympic Games
Gold medal – first place	2020 Tokyo	Épée B
Gold medal – first place	2020 Tokyo	Sabre B
Gold medal – first place	2020 Tokyo	Team Épée
World Championships
Gold medal – first place	2019 Cheongju	Épée B
Gold medal – first place	2019 Cheongju	Sabre B
Gold medal – first place	2019 Cheongju	Team Épée
Gold medal – first place	2019 Cheongju	Team Sabre

Tan Shumei (born 24 August 1989) is a Chinese wheelchair fencer. She won gold medals in both the women's Sabre B and Épée B events at the 2020 Summer Paralympics held in Tokyo, Japan. She also won the gold medal in the Team Épée. She also won four World Championship medals.
