= Artem Manko =

Ukrainian wheelchair fencer

Personal information
- Native name: Артем Манько
- Full name: Манько Артем Ігорович
- Nickname: Oknametra.ua
- Nationality: Ukrainian
- Citizenship: Ukrainian
- Born: 6 November 1998 (age 27) Cherkassy, Ukraine

Sport
- Country: Ukraine
- Sport: Wheelchair fencing
- Disability class: A4
- Turned pro: 2017
Medal record
Paralympic Games
Silver medal – second place	2020 Tokyo	Sabre A

Artem Manko (born 6 November 1998) is a Ukrainian wheelchair fencer who competes in épée, foil and sabre. He won the silver medal in the men's sabre A event at the 2020 Summer Paralympics held in Tokyo, Japan.
