= Adrian Castro =

Polish wheelchair fencer (born 1990)

Personal information
- Born: 4 June 1990 (age 36) Częstochowa, Poland

Sport
- Country: Poland
- Sport: Wheelchair fencing
Medal record
Wheelchair fencing
Representing Poland
Paralympic Games
Silver medal – second place	2020 Tokyo	Sabre B
Bronze medal – third place	2016 Rio de Janeiro	Sabre B

Adrian Castro (born 4 June 1990) is a Polish wheelchair fencer. He represented Poland at the Summer Paralympics in 2012, 2016 and 2021 and he is a two-time medalist in the men's sabre B event.

At the 2020 Summer Paralympics held in Tokyo, Japan, he won the silver medal in the men's sabre B event. He won the bronze medal in the men's sabre B event at the 2016 Summer Paralympics. In the same event at the 2012 Summer Paralympics he did not advance to the knockout stage of the competition.

In 2017, at the IWAS Wheelchair Fencing World Cup, he won the gold medal in the men's sabre B event. Two years later, he competed to defend his title and this time he won the silver medal in the men's sabre B event.
