= Dmitrii Bartasinskii =

Russian Paralympic swimmer

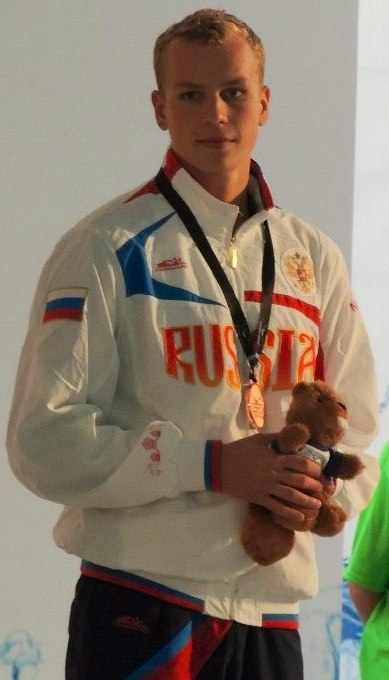
- Bartasinskii in 2013

Personal information
- Nationality: Russian
- Born: 19 January 1995 (age 31) Volgograd, Russia

Sport
- Sport: Paralympic swimming
- Disability class: SB9, S10
- Club: Meteor Sports School of Olympic Reserve
- Coached by: Alexander Kholoimov; Yekaterina Kholoimova
Medal record
Paralympic swimming
Representing RPC
Paralympic Games
Bronze medal – third place	2020 Tokyo	100 m breaststroke SB9
Representing Russia
World Championships
Bronze medal – third place	2019 London	100 m breaststroke SB9
European Championships
Bronze medal – third place	2020 Funchal	100 m breaststroke SB9
Bronze medal – third place	2020 Funchal	100 m freestyle S10

Dmitrii Bartasinskii (born 19 January 1995) is a Russian Paralympic swimmer who competed in the 2020 Summer Paralympics.

== Career ==
Bartasinskii represented Russian Paralympic Committee athletes at the 2020 Summer Paralympics in the men's 100 metre breaststroke SB9 and won a bronze medal.
