= Adelina Razetdinova =

Russian Paralympic swimmer

Personal information
- Born: 13 August 2000 (age 25) Tuymazy, Russia

Sport
- Sport: Paralympic swimming
- Disability class: S9
Medal record
Paralympic swimming
Paralympic Games
| Bronze medal – third place | 2020 Tokyo | 100m breaststroke SB8 |
European Championships
| Bronze medal – third place | 2020 Funchal | 100m breaststroke SB8 |

Adelina Razetdinova (born 13 August 2000) is a Russian Paralympic swimmer. She won the bronze medal in the 2020 Summer Paralympics in the women's 100m breaststroke SB8.
