= Yevheniia Breus =

Ukrainian wheelchair fencer

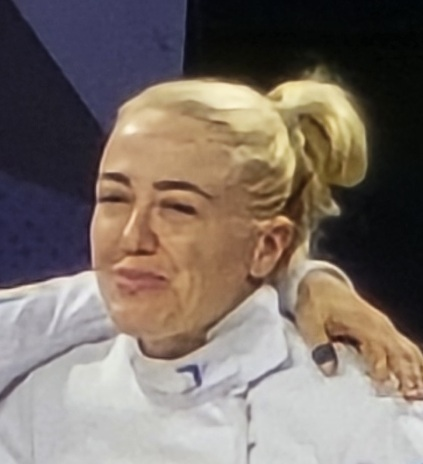

Sport
- Country: Ukraine
- Sport: Wheelchair fencing
Medal record
Paralympic Games
Silver medal – second place	2024 Paris	Team épée
Bronze medal – third place	2016 Rio de Janeiro	Épée A
Bronze medal – third place	2020 Tokyo	Sabre A

Yevheniia Breus is a Ukrainian wheelchair fencer. She represented Ukraine at the 2016 Summer Paralympics held in Rio de Janeiro, Brazil and she won the bronze medal in the women's épée A event. She also won the bronze medal in the women's sabre A event at the 2020 Summer Paralympics held in Tokyo, Japan.
