= Wheelchair fencing at the 2026 Asian Para Games =

- Venue: Nagoya City Inae Sports Center
- Location: Nagoya, Japan
- Dates: 19–24 October 2026
- Competitors: 95 from 12 nations

Wheelchair fencing at the 2026 Asian Para Games was held at the Nagoya City Inae Sports Center in Nagoya, Japan, from 19 to 24 October 2026. A total of 95 fencers from 12 National Paralympic Committees (NPCs) competed in 21 medal events across foil, épée and sabre: nine men's events, nine women's events and three mixed team events.

The tournament also served as the 2026 Para Fencing Asian Championships, with results contributing to qualification for the 2028 Summer Paralympics. China topped the medal table with 17 gold medals, followed by Thailand with three and South Korea with one.

== Competition summary ==
China won all four individual foil titles on the opening day, 19 October, and all three team foil titles the following day. On 21 October, South Korea's Cho Eun-hye defeated Thailand's Saysunee Jana in the women's épée B final, while Thailand's Visit Kingmanaw won the men's épée B title. China then won all three team épée titles on 22 October.

On 23 October, Jana won the women's sabre B title by defeating China's Ao Lanzhu 15–3 in the final, while China's Gu Haiyan completed a sweep of all three women's category A individual titles. On the final day, Thailand won the inaugural mixed team sabre title, while China won both the men's and women's team sabre competitions. Jana finished the Games with nine medals: two gold, three silver and four bronze.

== Classification ==
Individual competitions were contested in categories A and B, while the programme also included men's, women's and mixed team events in all three weapons.

== Participating nations ==
Twelve NPCs entered a total of 95 fencers.

1. China (19)
2. Hong Kong (11)
3. Indonesia (3)
4. Iran (2)
5. Iraq (9)
6. Japan (10)
7. South Korea (12)
8. Macau (1)
9. Philippines (4)
10. Thailand (14)
11. Chinese Taipei (4)
12. Uzbekistan (6)

== Medal table ==
Source: official medal standings.

* Host nation (Japan)

Rank	Nation	Gold	Silver	Bronze	Total
1	China (CHN)	17	8	12	37
2	Thailand (THA)	3	5	10	18
3	South Korea (KOR)	1	4	3	8
4	Hong Kong (HKG)	0	3	5	8
5	Iraq (IRQ)	0	1	0	1
6	Japan (JPN)*	0	0	3	3
Totals (6 entries)		21	21	33	75

== Medalists ==
Source: official results, 24 October 2026.

=== Men ===
Event	Class	Gold	Silver	Bronze
Individual foil	A	Zhong Saichun; China	Cheng Yang; China	Shintaro Kano; Japan
Individual foil	A	Zhong Saichun; China	Cheng Yang; China	Li Hao; China
Individual foil	B	Qin Benjun; China	Hu Daoliang; China	Feng Yanke; China
Individual foil	B	Qin Benjun; China	Hu Daoliang; China	Visit Kingmanaw; Thailand
Team foil	A–B	China (CHN); Li Hao; Cheng Yang; Zhong Saichun; Feng Yanke	Thailand (THA); Boonsiri Sanitmuanwai; Kitsada Pakdee; Phoopa Saesim; Visit Kingmanaw	Japan (JPN); Shintaro Kano; Takaaki Sasajima; Akira Tsunoda; Naoki Yasu
Individual épée	A	Zhong Saichun; China	Cheng Yang; China	Tian Jianquan; China
Individual épée	A	Zhong Saichun; China	Cheng Yang; China	Li Hao; China
Individual épée	B	Visit Kingmanaw; Thailand	Feng Yanke; China	Chitiphat Charoenta; Thailand
Individual épée	B	Visit Kingmanaw; Thailand	Feng Yanke; China	Qin Benjun; China
Team épée	A–B	China (CHN); Cheng Yang; Tian Jianquan; Zhang Jie; Zhong Saichun	Iraq (IRQ); Ammar Ali; Zainulabdeen Al-Madhkhoori; Hayder Al-Ogaili; Abdulrahman Alnezari	Japan (JPN); Kiyoharu Nakagawa; Takaaki Sasajima; Naoki Yasu
Individual sabre	A	Li Hao; China	Cheng Yang; China	Tian Jianquan; China
Individual sabre	A	Li Hao; China	Cheng Yang; China	Boonsiri Sanitmuanwai; Thailand
Individual sabre	B	Zhu Fanli; China	Zhang Jie; China	Chitiphat Charoenta; Thailand
Individual sabre	B	Zhu Fanli; China	Zhang Jie; China	Visit Kingmanaw; Thailand
Team sabre	A–B	China (CHN); Li Hao; Cheng Yang; Tian Jianquan; Zhang Jie	South Korea (KOR); Sim Jae-hoon; Lee Tae-gwon; Lee Jin-sol; Kim Dong-hun	Thailand (THA); Boonsiri Sanitmuanwai; Chitiphat Charoenta; Phoopa Saesim; Virot Sudjai

=== Women ===
Event	Class	Gold	Silver	Bronze
Individual foil	A	Gu Haiyan; China	Zou Xufeng; China	Yu Chui Yee; Hong Kong
Individual foil	A	Gu Haiyan; China	Zou Xufeng; China	Chen Yuandong; China
Individual foil	B	Kang Su; China	Saysunee Jana; Thailand	Zhou Jingjing; China
Individual foil	B	Kang Su; China	Saysunee Jana; Thailand	Jo Ye-jin; South Korea
Team foil	A–B	China (CHN); Kang Su; Gu Haiyan; Chen Yuandong; Zou Xufeng	Hong Kong (HKG); Chung Yuen Ping; Lam Ka Man; Tong Nga Ting; Yu Chui Yee	Thailand (THA); Aphinya Thongdaeng; Saysunee Jana; Thitirat Pengprasittipong; Suthin Sita
Individual épée	A	Gu Haiyan; China	Kwon Hyo-kyeong; South Korea	Zou Xufeng; China
Individual épée	A	Gu Haiyan; China	Kwon Hyo-kyeong; South Korea	Yu Chui Yee; Hong Kong
Individual épée	B	Cho Eun-hye; South Korea	Saysunee Jana; Thailand	Tong Nga Ting; Hong Kong
Individual épée	B	Cho Eun-hye; South Korea	Saysunee Jana; Thailand	Zhou Jingjing; China
Team épée	A–B	China (CHN); Gu Haiyan; Chen Yuandong; Zou Xufeng; Ao Lanzhu	Hong Kong (HKG); Fan Pui Shan; Lam Ka Man; Tong Nga Ting; Yu Chui Yee	Thailand (THA); Aphinya Thongdaeng; Duean Nakprasit; Saysunee Jana; Panadda Srithong
Individual sabre	A	Gu Haiyan; China	Thitirat Pengprasittipong; Thailand	Yu Chui Yee; Hong Kong
Individual sabre	A	Gu Haiyan; China	Thitirat Pengprasittipong; Thailand	Kwon Hyo-kyeong; South Korea
Individual sabre	B	Saysunee Jana; Thailand	Ao Lanzhu; China	Zhou Jingjing; China
Individual sabre	B	Saysunee Jana; Thailand	Ao Lanzhu; China	Geng Tianli; China
Team sabre	A–B	China (CHN); Peng Qiyuan; Gu Haiyan; Chen Yuandong; Ao Lanzhu	Hong Kong (HKG); Chung Yuen Ping; Lam Ka Man; Tong Nga Ting; Yu Chui Yee	Thailand (THA); Duean Nakprasit; Saysunee Jana; Thitirat Pengprasittipong; Chintanakon Seepak

=== Mixed ===
Event	Class	Gold	Silver	Bronze
Foil mixed team	A–B	China (CHN); Kang Su; Gu Haiyan; Zhong Saichun; Feng Yanke	Thailand (THA); Saysunee Jana; Thitirat Pengprasittipong; Phoopa Saesim; Visit Kingmanaw	South Korea (KOR); Kim Sun-mi; Lee Jin-sol; Cho Eun-hye; Lee Tae-gwon
Épée mixed team	A–B	China (CHN); Chen Yuandong; Zhang Jie; Ao Lanzhu; Zhong Saichun	South Korea (KOR); Sim Jae-hoon; Lee Jin-sol; Kwon Hyo-kyeong; Cho Eun-hye	Thailand (THA); Saysunee Jana; Virot Sudjai; Chitiphat Charoenta; Duean Nakprasit
Sabre mixed team	A–B	Thailand (THA); Saysunee Jana; Boonsiri Sanitmuanwai; Chitiphat Charoenta; Thitirat Pengprasittipong	South Korea (KOR); Sim Jae-hoon; Lee Jin-sol; Kwon Hyo-kyeong; Cho Eun-hye	Hong Kong (HKG); Sean Glass; Lam Ka Man; Tong Nga Ting; Kwong Yuen Hing
