= China at the 2020 Summer Paralympics =

- Flag of China
- IPC code: CHN
- NPC: China Administration of Sports for Persons with Disabilities

in Tokyo, Japan August 24, 2021 – September 5, 2021
- Competitors: 251 in 20 sports
- Medals Ranked 1st: Gold 96 Silver 60 Bronze 51 Total 207

Summer Paralympics appearances (overview)
- 1984; 1988; 1992; 1996; 2000; 2004; 2008; 2012; 2016; 2020; 2024

China competed at the 2020 Summer Paralympics in Tokyo, Japan from 24 August to 5 September 2021. This was their tenth consecutive appearance at the Summer Paralympics since 1984. China sent 251 athletes to the Games and competed in 20 of the 22 sports except Equestrian and Wheelchair rugby.

== Medalists ==
Medal	Name	Sport	Event	Date
Gold	Li Hao	Wheelchair fencing	Men's sabre A	25 August
Gold	Feng Yanke	Wheelchair fencing	Men's sabre B	25 August
Gold	Bian Jing	Wheelchair fencing	Women's sabre A	25 August
Gold	Tan Shumei	Wheelchair fencing	Women's sabre B	25 August
Gold	Zhang Li	Swimming	Women's 200 metre freestyle S5	25 August
Gold	Guo Lingling	Powerlifting	Women's 41 kg	26 August
Gold	Zhang Li; Zheng Tao; Yuan Weiyi; Lu Dong	Swimming	Mixed 4 × 50 metre freestyle relay 20pts	26 August
Gold	Tan Shumei	Wheelchair fencing	Women's épée B	26 August
Gold	Zhou Xia	Athletics	Women's 100 metres T35	27 August
Gold	Qi Yongkai	Powerlifting	Men's 59 kg	27 August
Gold	Dong Feixia	Athletics	Women's discus throw F55	27 August
Gold	Hu Dandan	Powerlifting	Women's 50 kg	27 August
Gold	Li Zhangyu	Cycling	Men's time trial C1–3	27 August
Gold	Zheng Tao	Swimming	Men's 50 metre butterfly S5	27 August
Gold	Lu Dong	Swimming	Women's 50 metre butterfly S5	27 August
Gold	Wen Xiaoyan	Athletics	Women's 200 metres T37	27 August
Gold	Liu Lei	Powerlifting	Men's 65 kg	27 August
Gold	Bian Jing; Tan Shumei; Rong Jing	Wheelchair fencing	Women's épée team	27 August
Gold	Di Dongdong	Athletics	Men's long jump T11	27 August
Gold	Liu Cuiqing	Athletics	Women's 400 metres T11	28 August
Gold	Tan Yujiao	Powerlifting	Women's 67 kg	28 August
Gold	Liu Yu	Swimming	Women's 150 metre individual medley SM4	28 August
Gold	Cai Liwen	Swimming	Women's 100 metre backstroke S11	28 August
Gold	Sun Gang	Wheelchair fencing	Men's foil A	28 August
Gold	Feng Panfeng	Table tennis	Men's individual class 3	28 August
Gold	Feng Yanke	Wheelchair fencing	Men's foil B	28 August
Gold	Chen Minyi; Zhang Tianxin	Archery	Mixed Team W1	28 August
Gold	Liu Jing	Table tennis	Women's individual class 1–2	28 August
Gold	Gu Haiyan	Wheelchair fencing	Women's foil A	28 August
Gold	Liu Li	Athletics	Men's club throw F32	28 August
Gold	Zhou Ying	Table tennis	Women's individual class 4	29 August
Gold	Yao Juan	Athletics	Women's discus throw F64	29 August
Gold	Shi Yiting	Athletics	Women's 200 metres T36	29 August
Gold	Yan Shuo	Table tennis	Men's individual – Class 7	29 August
Gold	Mao Jingdian	Table tennis	Women's individual class 8	29 August
Gold	Zhang Bian	Table tennis	Women's individual class 5	29 August
Gold	Xue Juan	Table tennis	Women's individual class 3	29 August
Gold	Ma Jia	Swimming	Women's 50 metre freestyle S11	29 August
Gold	Zou Liankang	Swimming	Men's 50 metre backstroke S3	29 August
Gold	Yan Panpan	Powerlifting	Men's 97 kg	29 August
Gold	Zhou Xia	Athletics	Women's 200 metres T35	29 August
Gold	Lin Yueshan; He Zihao	Archery	Team compound open	29 August
Gold	Wen Xiaoyan	Athletics	Women's long jump T37	29 August
Gold	Sun Gang; Hu Danliang; Li Hao; Feng Yanke	Wheelchair fencing	Men's foil team	29 August
Gold	Zou Lijuan	Athletics	Women's javelin throw F34	29 August
Gold	Rong Jing; Gu Haiyan; Zhou Jingjing; Xiao Rong	Wheelchair fencing	Women's foil team	29 August
Gold	Zhao Shuai	Table tennis	Men's individual class 8	30 August
Gold	Dong Chao	Shooting	Men's R1 10 metre air rifle standing SH1	30 August
Gold	Deng Xuemei	Powerlifting	Women's +86 kg	30 August
Gold	Wang Jingang	Swimming	Men's 50 metre butterfly S6	30 August
Gold	Jiang Yuyan	Swimming	Women's 50 metre butterfly S6	30 August
Gold	Zheng Tao	Swimming	Men's 50 metre backstroke S5	30 August
Gold	Lu Dong	Swimming	Women's 50 metre backstroke S5	30 August
Gold	Ma Jia	Swimming	Women's 200 metre individual medley SM11	30 August
Gold	Zhang Liangmin	Athletics	Women's discus throw F11	31 August
Gold	Zou Lijuan	Athletics	Women's shot put F34	31 August
Gold	He Zihao	Archery	Men's individual compound open	31 August
Gold	Yang Chao	Shooting	Men's P1 10 metre air pistol SH1	31 August
Gold	Chen Jianxin	Cycling	Men's road time trial T1–2	31 August
Gold	Zhou Zhaoqian	Athletics	Women's 1500 metres T54	31 August
Gold	Liu Li	Athletics	Men's shot put F32	31 August
Gold	Jiang Fenfen	Athletics	Women's 400 metres T37	31 August
Gold	Zhu Dening	Athletics	Men's long jump T38	1 September
Gold	Chen Minyi	Archery	Women's individual W1	1 September
Gold	Shi Yiting	Athletics	Women's 100 metres T36	1 September
Gold	Zheng Tao	Swimming	Men's 50 metre freestyle S5	1 September
Gold	Gao Fang	Athletics	Women's 100 metres T53	1 September
Gold	Zhou Zhaoqian	Athletics	Women's 100 metres T54	1 September
Gold	Wen Xiaoyan	Athletics	Women's 100 metres T37	2 September
Gold	Cao Ningning; Guo Xingyuan	Table tennis	Men's team class 4–5	2 September
Gold	Mao Jingdian; Hijang Wenjuan	Table tennis	Women's team class 6–8	2 September
Gold	Chen Jianxin	Cycling	Men's road race T1–2	2 September
Gold	Xue Juan; Li Quan	Table tennis	Women's team class 1–3	2 September
Gold	Huang Xing	Shooting	Mixed P3 25 metre pistol SH1	2 September
Gold	Jiang Yuyan	Swimming	Women's 400 metre freestyle S6	2 September
Gold	Zhao Shuai; Peng Weinan	Table tennis	Men's team class 8	2 September
Gold	Feng Panfeng; Zhai Xiang	Table tennis	Men's team class 3	2 September
Gold	Zhang Bian; Zhou Ying	Table tennis	Women's team class 4–5	3 September
Gold	Yan Shuo; Liao Keli	Table tennis	Men's team class 6–7	3 September
Gold	Zhang Cuiping	Shooting	Women's R8 50 metre 3 positions SH1	3 September
Gold	Jia Hongguang	Swimming	Men's 100 metre backstroke S6	3 September
Gold	Liu Yu	Swimming	Women's 50 metre backstroke S4	3 September
Gold	Li Guizhi	Swimming	Women's 100 metre freestyle S11	3 September
Gold	Lian Hao; Zhao Yi Qing	Table tennis	Men's team class 9–10	3 September
Gold	Lu Dong	Swimming	Women's 200 metre individual medley SM5	3 September
Gold	Wu Guoshan	Athletics	Men's shot put F57	3 September
Gold	Deng Peicheng	Athletics	Men's 100 metres T36	4 September
Gold	Yang Qiuxia	Badminton	Women's singles SU5	4 September
Gold	Liu Yutong	Badminton	Women's singles WH2	4 September
Gold	Liu Cuiqing	Athletics	Women's 200 metres T11	4 September
Gold	Qu Zimo	Badminton	Men's singles WH1	4 September
Gold	Sun Pengxiang	Athletics	Men's javelin throw F41	4 September
Gold	Mi Na	Athletics	Women's discus throw F38	4 September
Gold	Li Chaoyan	Athletics	Men's marathon T46	5 September
Gold	Cheng Hefang	Badminton	Women's singles SL4	5 September
Gold	Mai Jianpeng; Qu Zimo	Badminton	Men's doubles WH1–WH2	5 September
Silver	Wang Xiaomei	Cycling	Women's individual pursuit C1–3	25 August
Silver	Cui Zhe	Powerlifting	Women's 45 kg	26 August
Silver	Wang Lichao	Swimming	Men's 100 metre freestyle S5	26 August
Silver	Zhang Li	Swimming	Women's 100 metre freestyle S5	26 August
Silver	Rong Jing	Wheelchair fencing	Women's épée A	26 August
Silver	Xiao Cuijuan	Powerlifting	Women's 55 kg	27 August
Silver	Hua Dongdong	Swimming	Men's 50 metre freestyle S11	27 August
Silver	Wang Lichao	Swimming	Men's 50 metre butterfly S5	27 August
Silver	Jiang Fenfen	Athletics	Women's 200 metres T37	27 August
Silver	Tian Jianquan; Sun Gang; Hu Daoliang	Wheelchair fencing	Men's épée team	27 August
Silver	Zhao Yuping	Athletics	Women's javelin throw F13	27 August
Silver	Li Zhangyu; Wu Guoqing; Lai Shanzhang	Cycling	Mixed team sprint C1–5	28 August
Silver	Liu Daomin	Swimming	Women's 100 metre backstroke SB6	28 August
Silver	Zhou Yanfei	Swimming	Women's 150 metre individual medley SM4	28 August
Silver	Wang Xinyi	Swimming	Women's 100 metre backstroke S11	28 August
Silver	Xu Haijiao	Swimming	Men's 200 metre individual medley SM8	28 August
Silver	Hu Daoliang	Wheelchair fencing	Men's foil B	28 August
Silver	Gu Xiaofei	Powerlifting	Men's 80 kg	28 August
Silver	Zhu Dening	Athletics	Men's 100 metres T38	28 August
Silver	Mi Na	Athletics	Women's shot put F37	28 August
Silver	Zhou Jingjing	Wheelchair fencing	Women's foil B	28 August
Silver	Cao Ningning	Table tennis	Men's individual class 5	29 August
Silver	Yang Yue	Athletics	Women's discus throw F64	29 August
Silver	Ye Jixiong	Powerlifting	Men's 88 kg	29 August
Silver	Huang Wenjuan	Table tennis	Women's individual class 8	29 August
Silver	Xu Lili	Powerlifting	Women's 73 kg	29 August
Silver	Pan Jiamin	Table tennis	Women's individual class 5	29 August
Silver	Zhou Hongzhuan	Athletics	Women's 800 metres T53	29 August
Silver	Li Guizhi	Swimming	Women's 50 metre freestyle S11	29 August
Silver	Zhang Cuiping	Shooting	Women's R2 10 metre air rifle standing SH1	30 August
Silver	Zheng Feifei	Powerlifting	Women's 86 kg	30 August
Silver	Jia Hongguang	Swimming	Men's 50 metre butterfly S6	30 August
Silver	Xiong Giuyan	Table tennis	Women's individual class 9	30 August
Silver	Ruan Jingsong	Swimming	Men's 50 metre backstroke S5	30 August
Silver	Cai Liwen	Swimming	Women's 200 metre individual medley SM11	30 August
Silver	Sun Bianbian	Cycling	Women's road time trial H4–5	31 August
Silver	Huang Xing	Shooting	Men's P1 10 metre air pistol SH1	31 August
Silver	Liu Cuiqing	Athletics	Women's 100 metres T11	31 August
Silver	Ma Jia	Swimming	Women's 100 metre breaststroke SB11	1 September
Silver	Zhong Huanghao	Athletics	Men's long jump T38	1 September
Silver	Sun Bianbian	Cycling	Women's road race H5	1 September
Silver	Yuan Weiyi	Swimming	Men's 50 metre freestyle S5	1 September
Silver	Zhou Hongzhuan	Athletics	Women's 100 metres T53	1 September
Silver	Zou Liankang	Swimming	Men's 50 metre freestyle S3	2 September
Silver	Xu Mian	Athletics	Women's shot put F57	2 September
Silver	Dai Yunqiang	Athletics	Men's 800 metres T54	2 September
Silver	Jiang Yuyan	Swimming	Women's 100 metre backstroke S6	3 September
Silver	Yang Feng	Swimming	Men's 100 metre butterfly S8	3 September
Silver	Zhou Yanfei	Swimming	Women's 50 metre backstroke S4	3 September
Silver	Cheng Jiao	Swimming	Women's 200 metre individual medley SM5	3 September
Silver	China men's national goalball team: Lai Liangyu; Cai Changgui; Yang Mingyuan; Chen Liangliang; Hu Mingyao; Yu Qinquan	Goalball	Men's tournament	3 September
Silver	Zhao Lixue	Archery	Men's individual recurve open	3 September
Silver	Cheng Hefang; Ma Huihui	Badminton	Women's doubles SL3–SU5	4 September
Silver	Li Yingli	Athletics	Women's discus throw F38	4 September
Silver	Xu Tingting	Badminton	Women's singles WH2	4 September
Silver	Zhang Qi; Yan Zhiqiang; Lan Zhijian	Boccia	Mixed team BC1–2	4 September
Silver	China women's national wheelchair basketball team: Chen Xuejing; Zhang Xuemei; Zhang Tonglei; Lyu Guidi; Lin Suiling; Huang Xiaolian; Dai Jiameng; Lei Tianjiao; Chen Wenli; Yang Yan; Deng Mingzhu; Chen Meier	Wheelchair basketball	Women's tournament	4 September
Silver	Zhang Yong	Athletics	Men's marathon T54	5 September
Silver	Liu Yutong; Yin Menglu	Badminton	Women's doubles WH1–WH2	5 September
Silver	China women's national sitting volleyball team: Tang Xue Mei; Lyu Hongqin; Wang Li; Hu Huizi; Gong Bin; Wang Yanan; Gao Wenwen; Zhang Xufei; Xu Yixiao; Zhang Lijun; Qiu Junfei; Zhao Meiling	Sitting volleyball	Women's tournament	5 September
Bronze	Tian Jianquan	Wheelchair fencing	Men's sabre A	25 August
Bronze	Xiao Rong	Wheelchair fencing	Women's sabre B	25 August
Bronze	Li Zhangyu	Cycling	Men's individual pursuit C1	26 August
Bronze	Liang Guihua	Cycling	Men's individual pursuit C2	26 August
Bronze	Jia Hongguang	Swimming	Men's 200 metre individual medley SM6	26 August
Bronze	Hua Dongdong	Swimming	Men's 400 metre freestyle S11	26 August
Bronze	Cai Liwen	Swimming	Women's 400 metre freestyle S11	26 August
Bronze	Yang Guanglong	Swimming	Men's 100 metre breaststroke SB8	26 August
Bronze	Tian Jianquan	Wheelchair fencing	Men's épée A	26 August
Bronze	Bian Jing	Wheelchair fencing	Women's épée A	26 August
Bronze	Qian Wangwei	Cycling	Women's time trial C1–3	27 August
Bronze	Liu Fengqi	Swimming	Men's 100 metre backstroke S8	27 August
Bronze	Yuan Weiyi	Swimming	Men's 50 metre butterfly S5	27 August
Bronze	Cheng Jiao	Swimming	Women's 50 metre butterfly S5	27 August
Bronze	Gu Xiaodan	Table tennis	Women's individual class 4	28 August
Bronze	Zhang Miao	Table tennis	Women's individual class 4	28 August
Bronze	Zhai Xiang	Table tennis	Men's individual class 3	28 August
Bronze	Liao Keli	Table tennis	Men's individual class 7	28 August
Bronze	Peng Weinan	Table tennis	Men's individual class 8	28 August
Bronze	Wang Yue	Judo	Women's 63 kg	28 August
Bronze	Yang Bozun	Swimming	Men's 100 metre backstroke S11	28 August
Bronze	Li Guizhi	Swimming	Women's 100 metre backstroke S11	28 August
Bronze	Rong Jing	Wheelchair fencing	Women's foil A	28 August
Bronze	Yang Guanglong	Swimming	Men's 200 metre individual medley SM8	28 August
Bronze	Li Junsheng	Swimming	Men's 100 metre breaststroke SB5	28 August
Bronze	Li Yingli	Athletics	Women's shot put F37	28 August
Bronze	Liu Shuang; Jiang Jijian	Rowing	Mixed double sculls	29 August
Bronze	Yao Cuan	Swimming	Women's 100 metre breaststroke SB4	29 August
Bronze	Dai Yunqiang	Athletics	Men's 400 metres T54	29 August
Bronze	Wang Lichao	Swimming	Men's 50 metre backstroke S5	30 August
Bronze	Ai Xinliang	Archery	Men's individual compound open	31 August
Bronze	Jiang Yuyan	Swimming	Women's 100 metre freestyle S7	31 August
Bronze	Yang Bozun	Swimming	Men's 100 metre breaststroke SB11	1 September
Bronze	Wang Lichao	Swimming	Men's 50 metre freestyle S5	1 September
Bronze	Wu Qing	Athletics	Women's shot put F36	1 September
Bronze	Zhao Xiaojing; Xiong Guiyan	Table tennis	Women's team class 9–10	1 September
Bronze	Jiang Fenfen	Athletics	Women's 100 metres T37	2 September
Bronze	Feng Yazhu	Swimming	Women's 50 metre backstroke S2	2 September
Bronze	Di Dongdong	Athletics	Men's 100 metres T11	2 September
Bronze	Wu Chunyan	Archery	Women's individual recurve open	2 September
Bronze	Liang Yanfen	Athletics	Women's 100 metres T12	2 September
Bronze	Zhou Hongzhuan	Athletics	Women's 400 metres T53	2 September
Bronze	Zhou Zhaoqian	Athletics	Women's 400 metres T54	2 September
Bronze	Fu Xinhan	Athletics	Men's shot put F35	2 September
Bronze	Cai Liwen	Swimming	Women's 100 metre freestyle S11	3 September
Bronze	Li Yujie	Taekwondo	Women's 58 kg	3 September
Bronze	Wang Yang	Athletics	Men's 800 metres T34	4 September
Bronze	Yang Liwan	Athletics	Women's javelin throw F54	4 September
Bronze	Yin Menglu	Badminton	Women's singles WH1	4 September
Bronze	Wu Chunyan; Zhao Lixue	Archery	Mixed team recurve open	4 September
Bronze	Ma Huihui	Badminton	Women's singles SL4	5 September

== Competitors ==
The following is the list of number of competitors participating in the Games:

Sport	Men	Women	Total
Archery	6	7	13
Athletics	25	28	53
Badminton	2	7	9
Boccia	3	2	5
Cycling	5	5	10
Football 5-a-side	9	—	9
Goalball	6	4	10
Judo	0	2	2
Paracanoe	1	2	3
Paratriathlon	1	0	1
Powerlifting	6	8	14
Rowing	1	1	2
Shooting	6	4	10
Sitting volleyball	12	12	24
Swimming	16	16	32
Table tennis	14	13	27
Taekwondo	0	1	1
Wheelchair basketball	0	12	12
Wheelchair fencing	5	6	11
Wheelchair tennis	1	4	5
Total	121	135	256

== Archery ==
China have qualified 11 quotas for archery.

Men

Athlete	Event	Ranking round		Round of 64	Round of 32	Round of 16	Quarterfinals	Semifinals	Final	
Athlete	Event	Result	Rank	Opposition Result	Opposition Result	Opposition Result	Opposition Result	Opposition Result	Opposition Result	Rank
Li Ji	Individual W1	616	11	—N/a		Zandi (IRI); L 133–138	did not advance			
Zhang Tianxin	Individual W1	650	3	—N/a		Bye	Zandi (IRI); L 129–137	did not advance		
Ai Xinliang	Individual compound	695	6	Bye	Singpirom (THA); W 142–140	Gatin (RPC); W 146–145	Kumar (IND); W 145–143	Biabani (IRI); L 144–146	Pavlík (SVK); W 144–142	3rd place, bronze medalist(s)
He Zihao	Individual compound	705 PR	1	Bye	Quesada (CRC); W 143–140	Miyamoto (JPN); W 148–145	Turan (TUR); W 143–140	Pavlík (SVK); W 148–146	Biabani (IRI); W 147–143	1st place, gold medalist(s)
Wang Sijun	Individual recurve	604	19	—N/a	Ivan (SVK); L 2–6	did not advance				
Zhao Lixue	Individual recurve	639	2	—N/a	Mönkhbaatar (MGL); W 6–0	Bennett (USA); W 6–4	Phillips (GBR); W 6–2	Kim (KOR); W 6–5	Mather (USA); L 4–6	2nd place, silver medalist(s)

Women

Athlete	Event	Ranking round		Round of 64	Round of 32	Round of 16	Quarterfinals	Semifinals	Final	
Athlete	Event	Result	Rank	Opposition Result	Opposition Result	Opposition Result	Opposition Result	Opposition Result	Opposition Result	Rank
Chen Minyi	Individual W1	640 PR	1	—N/a		Bye	Okazaki (JPN); W 132–129	Coryell (USA); W 137–126	Musilová (CZE); W 132–129	1st place, gold medalist(s)
Liu Jing	Individual W1	615	2	—N/a		Bye	Musilová (CZE); L 124–128	did not advance		
Li Xinru	Individual compound	681	9	—N/a	Reppe (SWE); W 138–134	Chupin (FRA); L 138–145	did not advance			
Lin Yueshan	Individual compound	683	6	—N/a	Bye	Van Nest (CAN); W 142–130	Zúñiga (CHI); L 138^{10}-138^{X}	did not advance		
Zhou Jiamin	Individual compound	655	19	—N/a	Zúñiga (CHI); L 137–144	did not advance				
Gao Fangxia	Individual recurve	582	9	—N/a	Kim (KOR); W 7–3	Shigesada (JPN); L 1–7	did not advance			
Wu Chunyan	Individual recurve	642 PR	1	—N/a	Bye	Dzoba-Balyan (UKR); W 6–0	Shigesada (JPN); W 7–1	Petrilli (ITA); L 5–6	Poimenidou (GRE); W 6–2	3rd place, bronze medalist(s)

Mixed

Athlete	Event	Ranking round		Round of 64	Round of 32	Round of 16	Quarterfinals	Semifinals	Final	
Athlete	Event	Result	Rank	Opposition Result	Opposition Result	Opposition Result	Opposition Result	Opposition Result	Opposition Result	Rank
Chen Minyi; Zhang Tianxin	Team W1	1290 WR	1	—N/a			Bye	RPC (RPC); W 142–128	Czech Republic (CZE); W 138–132	1st place, gold medalist(s)
Li Xinru; He Zihao	Team compound	1388 PR	1	—N/a		Bye	France (FRA); W 154–151	Iran (IRI); W 150–145	Turkey (TUR); W 153–152	1st place, gold medalist(s)
Chunyan Wu; Lixue Zhao	Team recurve	1281 PR	1	—N/a		Bye	Poland (POL); W 6–0	RPC (RPC); L 4–5	Iran (IRI); W 6–2	3rd place, bronze medalist(s)

== Athletics ==
China is scheduled to compete in athletics.

Men's track

Athlete	Event	Heats		Semi-final		Final	
Athlete	Event	Result	Rank	Result	Rank	Result	Rank
Dai Yunqiang	400m T54	46.13	2 Q	—N/a		46.20	3rd place, bronze medalist(s)
Dai Yunqiang	800m T54	1:35.12	3 q	—N/a		1:34.11	2nd place, silver medalist(s)
Dai Yunqiang	1500m T54	3:04.24	7	—N/a		did not advance	
Dai Yunqiang	5000m T54	10:14.80	6 q	—N/a		10:33.25	9
Dai Yunqiang	Marathon T54	—N/a				1:31:27	9
Deng Peicheng	100m T36	11.88	2 Q	—N/a		11.85	1st place, gold medalist(s)
Di Dongdong	100m T11	11.07	1 Q	11.23	2 q	11.03	3rd place, bronze medalist(s)
Hu Yang	100m T54	13.96	2 Q	—N/a		14.09	6
Hu Yang	5000m T54	10:48.73	7	—N/a		did not advance	
Li Chaoyan	1500m T46	—N/a				4:11.63	12
Li Chaoyan	Marathon T46	—N/a				2:25:50 GR	1st place, gold medalist(s)
Liu Yang	100m T54	14.47	3	—N/a		did not advance	
Liu Yang	400m T54	48.96	5	—N/a		did not advance	
Song Lei	800m T54	1:37.80	3	—N/a		did not advance	
Wang Hao	100m T47	10.85	2 Q	—N/a		10.74	4
Wang Hao	400m T47	DQ		—N/a		did not advance	
Wang Yang	100m T34	—N/a				15.80	4
Wang Yang	800m T34	1:47.48	2 Q	—N/a		1:45.68	3rd place, bronze medalist(s)
Yang Shaoqiao	100m T53	15.46	5	—N/a		did not advance	
Yang Shaoqiao	400m T53	DQ		—N/a		did not advance	
Yang Shaoqiao	800m T53	1:41.19	3 Q	—N/a		1:40.08	4
Yang Shaoqiao	Marathon T54	—N/a				1:31:27	8
Yifei Yang	100m T36	12.10	2 Q	—N/a		12.18	5
Zhang Ying	100m T54	13.95	2 Q	—N/a		14.04	4
Zhang Ying	800m T54	2:55.66	2 Q	—N/a		2:53.26	8
Zhang Ying	1500m T54	2:55.66	2 Q	—N/a		2:53.26	8
Zhang Ying	Marathon T54	—N/a				1:32:26	11
Zhang Yong	400m T54	46.30	2 Q	—N/a		47.17	5
Zhang Yong	800m T54	3:03.45	2 Q	—N/a		2:50.78	4
Zhang Yong	1500m T54	3:03.45	2 Q	—N/a		2:50.78	4
Zhang Yong	5000m T54	10:15.46	3 Q	—N/a		10:30.82	7
Zhang Yong	Marathon T54	—N/a				1:24:22	2nd place, silver medalist(s)
Zhao Guocun	Marathon T46	—N/a				2:33:11	5
Zhong Huanghao	100m T38	11.56	3 Q	—N/a		11.63	6
Zhou Peng	100m T38	11.89	6	—N/a		did not advance	
Zhu Dening	100m T38	11.15	1 Q	—N/a		11.00	2nd place, silver medalist(s)

Men's field

Athlete	Event	Final	
Athlete	Event	Result	Rank
Chen Hongjie	High jump T47	1.98	4
Chen Hongjie	Long jump T47	6.26	11
Di Dongdong	Long jump T11	6.47	1st place, gold medalist(s)
Fu Xinhan	Shot put F35	15.41	3rd place, bronze medalist(s)
Liu Li	Club throw F32	45.39 WR	1st place, gold medalist(s)
Liu Li	Shot put F32	12.97	1st place, gold medalist(s)
Pang Baolong	Shot put F63	10.21	6
Sun Pengxiang	Javelin throw F41	47.13 WR	1st place, gold medalist(s)
Sun Pengxiang	Shot put F41	10.21	6
Wang Hao	Long jump T47	7.18	5
Wang Yanzhang	Javelin throw F34	36.49	4
Wang Yanzhang	Shot put F34	10.70	7
Wei Enlong	Shot put F46	15.48	6
Wu Guoshan	Shot put F57	15.00	1st place, gold medalist(s)
Yifei Yang	Long jump T36	5.40	8
Zhang Zhongqiang	Javelin throw F34	32.47	5
Zhong Huanghao	Long jump T38	6.80	2nd place, silver medalist(s)
Zhou Peng	Long jump T38	6.00	9
Zhu Dening	Long jump T38	7.13	1st place, gold medalist(s)

Women's track

Athlete	Event	Heats		Semi-finals		Final	
Athlete	Event	Result	Rank	Result	Rank	Result	Rank
Gao Fang	100m T53	—N/a				16.29	1st place, gold medalist(s)
Gao Fang	400m T53	57.28	2 Q	—N/a		57.81	5
Gao Fang	800m T53	DQ		—N/a		did not advance	
Gao Fang	Marathon T54	—N/a				2:14:34	16
He Shanshan	1500m T11	4:52.40	2 Q	—N/a		4:52.72	6
Jiang Fenfen	100m T37	13.34	1 Q	—N/a		13.17	3rd place, bronze medalist(s)
Jiang Fenfen	200m T37	27.57	2 Q	—N/a		27.33	2nd place, silver medalist(s)
Jiang Fenfen	400m T37						
Li Lu	100m T47						
Li Lu	200m T47						
Li Lu	400m T47	58.31	2 Q	—N/a		58.51	4
Liang Yanfen	100m T12						
Liang Yanfen	200m T12						
Liu Cuiqing	100m T11	12.80	1 Q	12.35	3 q	12.15	2nd place, silver medalist(s)
Liu Cuiqing	200m T11						
Liu Cuiqing	400m T11	59.30	1 Q	58.17	1 Q	56.25	1st place, gold medalist(s)
Shi Yiting	100m T36	14.50	1 Q	—N/a		13.61 WR	1st place, gold medalist(s)
Shi Yiting	200m T36	29.37	1 Q	—N/a		28.21 WR	1st place, gold medalist(s)
Wen Xiaoyan	100m T37						
Wen Xiaoyan	200m T37	27.16	1 Q	—N/a		26.58 WR	1st place, gold medalist(s)
Zhou Hongzhuan	100m T53	—N/a				16.48	2nd place, silver medalist(s)
Zhou Hongzhuan	400m T53	56.14	2 Q	—N/a		57.29	3rd place, bronze medalist(s)
Zhou Hongzhuan	800m T53	1:51.16	2 Q	—N/a		1:47.66	2nd place, silver medalist(s)
Zhou Xia	100m T35	13.86	1 Q	—N/a		13.00	1st place, gold medalist(s)
Zhou Xia	200m T35	—N/a				27.17 WR	1st place, gold medalist(s)
Zhou Zhaoqian	100m T54						
Zhou Zhaoqian	400m T54						
Zhou Zhaoqian	1500m T54						
Zhou Zhaoqian	Marathon T54	—N/a				1:55:46	14
Zou Lihong	100m T54						
Zou Lihong	400m T54						
Zou Lihong	800m T54	1:54.18	4	did not advance			
Zou Lihong	1500m T54						
Zou Lihong	5000m T54	—N/a				11:18.06	9
Zou Lihong	Marathon T54	—N/a				1:49:02	10

Women's field

Athlete	Event	Final	
Athlete	Event	Result	Rank
Dong Feixia	Discus throw F55	26.64	1st place, gold medalist(s)
Huang Yezi	Javelin throw F46	34.76	6
Li Yingli	Discus throw F38	33.73	2nd place, silver medalist(s)
Li Yingli	Shot put F37	13.33	3rd place, bronze medalist(s)
Mi Na	Discus throw F38	38.50	1st place, gold medalist(s)
Mi Na	Shot put F37	13.69	2nd place, silver medalist(s)
Qian Zao	Shot put F33	NM	
Tang Hongxia	Discus throw F11	33.46	4
Wen Xiaoyan	Long jump T37	5.13	1st place, gold medalist(s)
Wu Qing	Shot put F36	9.36	3rd place, bronze medalist(s)
Xu Mian	Discus throw F57	29.22	7
Xu Mian	Shot put F57	10.81	2nd place, silver medalist(s)
Yang Liwan	Javelin throw F54	17.83	3rd place, bronze medalist(s)
Yang Liwan	Shot put F54	7.01	5
Yang Yue	Discus throw F64	40.48	2nd place, silver medalist(s)
Yao Juan	Discus throw F64	44.73 WR	1st place, gold medalist(s)
Zhang Liangmin	Discus throw F11	40.83	1st place, gold medalist(s)
Zhang Liangmin	Shot put F12	10.31	9
Zhao Yuping	Javelin throw F13	41.85	2nd place, silver medalist(s)
Zhao Yuping	Shot put F12	13.08	5
Zou Lijuan	Javelin throw F34	22.28 WR	1st place, gold medalist(s)
Zou Lijuan	Shot put F34	9.19	1st place, gold medalist(s)

== Badminton ==
Men

Athlete	Event	Group Stage			Quarterfinal	Semifinal	Final / BM	
Athlete	Event	Opposition Score	Opposition Score	Rank	Opposition Score	Opposition Score	Opposition Score	Rank
Qu Zimao	Singles WH1	Nagashima (JPN); W (21–9, 21–12)	Toupé (FRA); W (21–11, 21–13)	1 Q	Bye	Murayama (JPN); W (21–16, 21–11)	Lee S-s (KOR); W (21–6, 11–6^{r})	1st place, gold medalist(s)
Mai Jianpeng	Singles WH2	Junthong (THA); W (21–12, 21–6)	Rooke (GBR); W (21–17, 21–16)	1 Q	Kim K-h (KOR); L (13–21, 12–21)	Did not advance		
Qu Zimao; Mai Jianpeng	Doubles WH1–WH2	Mi / Wamdschneider (GER); W (21–10, 21–8)	Murayama / Kajiwara (JPN); W (21–13, 21–10)	1 Q	—N/a	Murayama / Kajiwara (JPN); W (21–8, 21–17)	Kim J-j / Lee D-s (KOR); W (21–10, 21–14)	1st place, gold medalist(s)

Women

Athlete	Event	Group Stage				Quarterfinal	Semifinal	Final / BM	
Athlete	Event	Opposition Score	Opposition Score	Opposition Score	Rank	Opposition Score	Opposition Score	Opposition Score	Rank
Yin Menglu	Singles WH1	Kang (KOR); W (21–16, 21–14)	Satomi (JPN); W (21–11, 24–22)	—N/a	1 Q	Bye	Satomi (JPN); L (18–21, 18–21)	Zhang (CHN); W (21–10, 21–18)	3rd place, bronze medalist(s)
Zhang Jing	Singles WH1	Gorodetzky (ISR); W (21–11, 21–12)	Mathez (SUI); W (20–22, 25–23, 21–12)	Pookkham (THA); L (4–21, 19–21)	2 Q	Knoblauch (GER); W (21–16, 21–18)	Pookkham (THA); L (11–21, 7–21)	Yin (CHN); L (10–21, 18–21)	4
Liu Yutong	Singles WH2	Gureeva (RPC); W (21–3, 21–5)	Jáuregui (PER); W (21–5, 21–9)	—N/a	1 Q	Bye	Seçkin (TUR); W (21–7, 21–4)	Xu (CHN); W (21–15, 21–15)	1st place, gold medalist(s)
Xu Tingting	Singles WH2	Ogura (JPN); W (21–6, 21–8)	Wetwithan (THA); W (21–16, 21–3)	—N/a	1 Q	Bye	Yamazaki (JPN); W (21–12, 21–13)	Liu (CHN); W (15–21, 15–21)	2nd place, silver medalist(s)
Cheng Hefang	Singles SL4	Parmar (IND); W (21–8, 21–2)	Seibert (GER); W (21–5, 21–11)	—N/a	1 Q	—N/a	Sagøy (NOR); W (21–15, 21–10)	Oktila (INA); W (21–19, 17–21, 21–16)	1st place, gold medalist(s)
Ma Huihui	Singles SL4	Fujino (JPN); W (27–25, 21–8)	Saensupa (THA); W (21–10, 0–0^{r})	—N/a	1 Q	—N/a	Oktila (INA); L (12–21, 7–21)	Sagøy (NOR); W (21–12, 21–5)	3rd place, bronze medalist(s)
Yang Qiuxia	Singles SU5	Asiimwe (UGA); W (21–2, 21–6)	Monteiro (POR); W (21–10, 21–9)	Hollander (NED); W (21–8, 21–9)	1 Q	Bye	Sugino (JPN); W (21–11, 21–11)	Suzuki (JPN); W (21–17, 21–19)	1st place, gold medalist(s)
Yin Menglu; Liu Yutong	Doubles WH1–WH2	Knoblauch / Rongen (GER); W (21–3, 21–8)	Mathez / Suter-Erath (SUI); W (21–4, 21–9)	—N/a	1 Q	—N/a	Mathez / Suter-Erath (SUI); W (21–10, 21–13)	Satomi / Yamazaki (JPN); L (21–16, 16–21, 13–21)	2nd place, silver medalist(s)
Cheng Hefang; Ma Huihui	Doubles SL3–SU5	Parmar / Kohli (IND); W (21–7, 21–5)	Morin / Noël (FRA); W (21–9, 21–10)	—N/a	1 Q	—N/a	Ito / Suzuki (JPN); W (21–6, 21–12)	Oktila / Sadiyah (INA); L (18–21, 12–21)	2nd place, silver medalist(s)

== Boccia ==
Athlete	Event	Group Stage					Quarterfinal	Semifinal	Final / BM	
Athlete	Event	Opposition Score	Opposition Score	Opposition Score	Opposition Score	Rank	Opposition Score	Opposition Score	Opposition Score	Rank
Zhang Qi	Individual BC1	Smith (GBR); L 1–7	Sanchez Reyes (MEX); W 5–3	Nakamura (JPN); W 6–2	Ibarbure (ARG); W 5–1	2 Q	Wei Lun (MAS); L 2–4	did not advance		
Lan Zhijian	Individual BC2	Yan (CHN); W 6–0	Kozmin (RPC); L 3–4	Aquino (ARG); W 4–3	—N/a	2 Q	Saengampa (THA); L 5–8	did not advance		
Yan Zhiqiang	Individual BC2	Lan (CHN); L 0–4	Aquino (ARG); L 0–6	Kozmin (RPC); L 0–6	—N/a	DSQ	did not advance			
Lin Ximei	Individual BC4	Zheng (CHN); L 5-5	Ciobanu (ROU); L 4–6	Oliveira (POR); W 6–2	—N/a	3	did not advance			
Zheng Yuansen	Individual BC4	Lin (CHN); W 5-5	Oliveira (POR); W 10–2	Ciobanu (ROU); W 8–2	—N/a	1 Q	dos Santos (BRA); W 3-3	Andrejčík (SVK); L 2–5	Leung (HKG); L 4–5	4
Zhang Qi; Yan Zhiqiang; Lan Zhijian	Team BC1–2	Great Britain (GBR); W 11–7	Argentina (ARG); W 8–1	RPC (RPC); W 6*-6	Thailand (THA); W 6–3	1 Q	—N/a	Portugal (POR); W 6–2	Thailand (THA); L 2–8	2nd place, silver medalist(s)

== Football 5-a-side ==
Team roster

The following is the China squad in the football 5-a-side tournament of the 2020 Summer Paralympics.

No.	Pos.	Player	Class	Date of birth (age)
1	GK	Wang Zhen	Sighted	26 July 1992 (aged 28)
3	DF	Liu Meng	B1	1 July 1995 (aged 25)
5	FW	Liang Zhongzhi	B1	8 November 1994 (aged 25)
6	MF	Zhang Jiabin	B1	10 May 1994 (aged 26)
7	FW	Yu Yutan	B1	1 January 1989 (aged 31)
10	DF	Tang Zhihua	B1	14 April 1993 (aged 27)
11	FW	Zhu Ruiming	B1	4 April 2000 (aged 20)
12	GK	Wu Limin	Sighted	7 February 1990 (aged 30)

Group A

Pos	Team	Pld	W	D	L	GF	GA	GD	Pts	Qualification
1	Brazil	3	3	0	0	11	0	+11	9	Semi finals
2	China	3	2	0	1	3	3	0	6	Semi finals
3	Japan	3	1	0	2	4	6	−2	3	5th–6th place match
4	France	3	0	0	3	0	9	−9	0	7th–8th place match

Source: TOCOG
29 August 2021
11:30

Brazil	3–0	China
Nonato 15', 36'; Cássio 25' (pen.)	Report

Aomi Urban Sports Park, Tokyo
Referee: François Carcouët (France)

30 August 2021
9:00

China	1–0	France
Zhu Ruiming 37'	Report

Aomi Urban Sports Park, Tokyo
Referee: Stuart Winton (Great Britain)

31 August 2021
9:00

Japan	0–2	China
	Report	Zhu Ruiming 12', 18'

Aomi Urban Sports Park, Tokyo
Referee: François Carcouët (France)

Semi-final

2 September 2021
16:30

China	0–2	Argentina
	Report	Espinillo 18', 22'

Aomi Urban Sports Park, Tokyo
Referee: Lucio Morgado (Brazil)

Bronze medal match

4 September 2021
11:30

China	0–4	Morocco
	Report	Snisla 4', 8', 18', 30'

Aomi Urban Sports Park, Tokyo
Referee: Lucio Morgado (Brazil)

== Goalball ==
Summary

Team	Event	Group stage					Quarter-finals	Semi-finals	GM / BM	
Team	Event	Opposition Score	Opposition Score	Opposition Score	Opposition Score	Opposition Score	Rank	Opposition Score	Opposition Score	Rank
China men's	Men's tournament	Belgium; L 3–10	Ukraine; W 7–3	Turkey; L 3–6	Germany; W 8–3	4 Q	Japan; W 7–4	USA; W 8–1	Brazil; L 2–7	2nd place, silver medalist(s)
China women's	Women's tournament	RPC (RPC); L 3–4	Australia; W 6–0	Israel; W 4–1	Canada; W 32–4	1 Q	Brazil; L 0–1	Did not advance		5

=== Men ===
The following is the China roster in the men's goalball tournament of the 2020 Summer Paralympics.

No.	Player	Class	Date of birth (age)
1	Lai Liangyu	B1	9 October 2000 (aged 20)
2	Cai Changgui	B1	15 April 1983 (aged 38)
3	Yang Mingyuan	B2	13 January 1998 (aged 23)
4	Chen Liangliang	B1	28 September 1984 (aged 36)
5	Hu Mingyao	B2	14 January 1995 (aged 26)
6	Yu Qinquan	B1	19 April 1996 (aged 25)

Group stage

Pos	Team	Pld	W	D	L	GF	GA	GD	Pts	Qualification
1	Belgium	4	2	0	2	18	13	+5	6	Quarter-finals
2	Ukraine	4	2	0	2	18	15	+3	6	Quarter-finals
3	Turkey	4	2	0	2	15	15	0	6	Quarter-finals
4	China	4	2	0	2	21	22	−1	6	Quarter-finals
5	Germany	4	2	0	2	16	23	−7	6	

Source: TOCOG

26 August 2021; 09:00	Belgium	10−3	China	Makuhari Messe, Tokyo; Referees: Woradet Kultawongwattana (Thailand), Bas Spaans (Netherlands)
26 August 2021; 09:00	Mapreni 8 T. Vanhove 1 Amnir 1	Report	Yang Mingyuan 1 Hu Mingyao 1 Lai Liangyu 1	Makuhari Messe, Tokyo; Referees: Woradet Kultawongwattana (Thailand), Bas Spaans (Netherlands)

27 August 2021; 17:30	China	7–3	Ukraine	Makuhari Messe, Tokyo; Referees: Romualdas Vaitiekus (Lithuania), Warrick Jackes (Australia)
27 August 2021; 17:30	Chen Liangliang 3 Cai Changgui 2 Yang Mingyuan 2	Report	Zhyhalin 2 Oliinyk 1	Makuhari Messe, Tokyo; Referees: Romualdas Vaitiekus (Lithuania), Warrick Jackes (Australia)

28 August 2021; 10:30	Turkey	6–3	China	Makuhari Messe, Tokyo; Referees: Svitlana Moroz (Ukraine), Yoshinori Nii (Japan)
28 August 2021; 10:30	Kara 3 Karakaya 3	Report	Yang Mingyuan 2 Cai Changgui 1	Makuhari Messe, Tokyo; Referees: Svitlana Moroz (Ukraine), Yoshinori Nii (Japan)

30 August 2021; 17:30	China	8–3	Germany	Makuhari Messe, Tokyo; Referees: Reza Dehghan (Iran), Romualdas Vaitiekus (Lithuania)
30 August 2021; 17:30	Yang Mingyuan 7 Hu Mingyao 1	Report	Dennis 2 Tiede 1	Makuhari Messe, Tokyo; Referees: Reza Dehghan (Iran), Romualdas Vaitiekus (Lithuania)

Quarter-final

31 August 2021; 13:15	Japan	4–7	China	Makuhari Messe, Tokyo; Referees: Reza Dehghan (Iran), Svitlana Moroz (Ukraine)
31 August 2021; 13:15	Miyajiki 4	Report	Yang Mingyuan 6 Cai Changgui 1	Makuhari Messe, Tokyo; Referees: Reza Dehghan (Iran), Svitlana Moroz (Ukraine)

Semi-finals

2 September 2021; 13:15	China	8–1	United States	Makuhari Messe, Tokyo; Referees: Bas Spaans (Netherlands), Raquel Gomez Aguado (Spain)
2 September 2021; 13:15	Yang Mingyuan 6 Hu Mingyao 2	Report	Young 1	Makuhari Messe, Tokyo; Referees: Bas Spaans (Netherlands), Raquel Gomez Aguado (Spain)

Gold medal match

3 September 2021; 19:30	China	2–7	Brazil	Makuhari Messe, Tokyo; Referees: Yoshinori Nii (Japan), Romualdas Vaitiekus (Lithuania)
3 September 2021; 19:30	Yang Mingyuan 2	Report	Moreno 3 Sousa 3 Marques 1	Makuhari Messe, Tokyo; Referees: Yoshinori Nii (Japan), Romualdas Vaitiekus (Lithuania)

=== Women ===
The following is the China roster in the women's goalball tournament of the 2020 Summer Paralympics.

No.	Player	Class	Date of birth (age)
1	Zhang Xiling	B3	17 June 1998 (aged 23)
2	Cao Zhenhua	B1	23 August 1997 (aged 24)
3	Chen Fengqing	B1	17 July 1985 (aged 36)
5	Zhang Wei	B1	22 December 1989 (aged 31)

Group stage

Pos	Team	Pld	W	D	L	GF	GA	GD	Pts	Qualification
1	China	4	3	0	1	17	7	+10	9	Quarterfinals
2	Israel	4	2	0	2	22	14	+8	6	Quarterfinals
3	RPC	4	2	0	2	13	16	−3	6	Quarterfinals
4	Australia	4	2	0	2	9	21	−12	6	Quarterfinals
5	Canada	4	1	0	3	12	15	−3	3	

Source: TOCOG
Rules for classification: 1) points; 2) goal difference; 3) number of wins; 4) goals against; 5) head-to-head goal difference.
26 August 2021
10:30

China	3–4	RPC
Cao Zhenhua 3', 10'; Chen Fengqing 24'	Report	Arestova 3', 4', 12'; Gerasimova 3'

Makuhari Messe, Tokyo
Referee: Romualdas Vaitiekus (Lithuania), Launel Scott (Canada)

27 August 2021
14:45

Australia	0–6	China
	Report	Cao Zhenhua 9', 16'; Chen Fengqing 13'; Zhang Xiling 15', 21', 22'

Makuhari Messe, Tokyo
Referee: Launel Scott (Canada), Raili Sipura (Finland)

29 August 2021
14:45

Israel	1–4	China
Ben-David 5'	Report	Zhang Xiling 6', 6', 15'; Cao Zhenhua 24'

Makuhari Messe, Tokyo
Referee: Raili Sipura (Finland), Raquel Aguado Gómez (Spain)

30 August 2021
14:45

China	4–2	Canada
Chen Fengqing 2'; Zhang Xiling 3', 4', 22'	Report	Reinke 16'; Burk 18'

Makuhari Messe, Tokyo
Referee: Vaida Pokvytytė (Lithuania), Raili Sipura (Finland)

Quarterfinal

1 September 2021
17:45

China	0–1 (2OT)	Brazil
	Report	Custodio 28'

Makuhari Messe, Tokyo
Referee: Yoshinori Nii (Japan), Reza Dehghan (Iran)

== Judo ==
Athlete	Event	Round of 16	Quarterfinals	Semifinals	Repechage 1	Repechage 2	Final / BM	
Athlete	Event	Opposition Result	Opposition Result	Opposition Result	Opposition Result	Opposition Result	Opposition Result	Rank
Li Liqing	Women's −48 kg	Bye	Martinet (FRA); L 00–10	Bye		Kai-lin (TPE); L 00–10	Did not advance	7
Wang Yue	Women's −63 kg	Bye	Arce Payno (ESP); W 10–00	Huseynova (AZE); L 00–01	Bye		Pozdnysheva (RPC); W 10–00	3rd place, bronze medalist(s)

== Paratriathlon ==
Athlete	Event	Swim	Trans 1	Bike	Trans 2	Run	Total Time	Rank
Wang Jiachao	Men's PTS4	11:15	1:24	32:10	0:56	19:09	1:04:54	4

== Powerlifting ==
Men

Athlete	Event	Result	Rank
Qi Yongkai	−59 kg	187	1st place, gold medalist(s)
Liu Lei	−65 kg	198	1st place, gold medalist(s)
Hu Peng	−72 kg	NM	
Gu Xiaofei	−80 kg	215	2nd place, silver medalist(s)
Ye Jixiong	−88 kg	220	2nd place, silver medalist(s)
Yan Panpan	−88 kg	227	1st place, gold medalist(s)

Women

Athlete	Event	Result	Rank
Guo Lingling	−41 kg	108	1st place, gold medalist(s)
Cui Zhe	−45 kg	102	2nd place, silver medalist(s)
Hu Dandan	−50 kg	120	1st place, gold medalist(s)
Xiao Cuijuan	−55 kg	124	2nd place, silver medalist(s)
Tan Yujiao	−67 kg	133	1st place, gold medalist(s)
Xu Lili	−73 kg	134	2nd place, silver medalist(s)
Zheng Feifei	−86 kg	139	2nd place, silver medalist(s)
Deng Xuemei	+86 kg	153	1st place, gold medalist(s)

== Rowing ==
China qualified one boat in the mixed double sculls for the games by winning the B-final and securing the seven of eight available place at the 2019 World Rowing Championships in Ottensheim, Austria.

Athlete	Event	Heats		Repechage		Final	
Athlete	Event	Time	Rank	Time	Rank	Time	Rank
Liu Shuang; Jiang Jijian	Mixed double sculls	8:46.15	1 FA	Bye		8:49.42	3rd place, bronze medalist(s)

Qualification Legend: FA=Final A (medal); FB=Final B (non-medal); R=Repechage

== Shooting ==
China entered ten athletes into the Paralympic competition. All of them successfully break the Paralympic qualification at the 2018 WSPS World Championships which was held in Cheongju, South Korea, 2019 WSPS World Cup in Al Ain, United Arab Emirates and 2019 WSPS World Championships in Sydney, Australia.

Men

Athlete	Event	Qualification		Final	
Athlete	Event	Score	Rank	Score	Rank
Dong Chao	R1 – 10 m air rifle standing SH1	617.6	5 Q	246.4 PR	1st place, gold medalist(s)
Tian Fugang	R1 – 10 m air rifle standing SH1	592.1	21	did not advance	
Yang Chao	P1 – 10 m air pistol SH1	572	5 Q	237.9 PR	1st place, gold medalist(s)
Lou Xiaolong	P1 – 10 m air pistol SH1	575	2 Q	196.5	4
Huang Xing	P1 – 10 m air pistol SH1	574	3 Q	237.5	2nd place, silver medalist(s)
Tian Fugang	R7 – 50 m rifle three positions SH1				
Dong Chao	R7 – 50 m rifle three positions SH1				

Women

Athlete	Event	Qualification		Final	
Athlete	Event	Score	Rank	Score	Rank
Bai Xiaohong	R2 – 10 m air rifle standing SH1	621.5	8 Q	143.1	7
Zhang Cuiping	R2 – 10 m air rifle standing SH1	626.0	1 Q	248.9	2nd place, silver medalist(s)
Li Min	P2 – 10 m air pistol SH1	556	9	did not advance	
Bai Xiaohong	R8 – 50 m rifle three positions				
Yan Taping	R8 – 50 m rifle three positions				
Zhang Cuiping	R8 – 50 m rifle three positions				

Mixed

Athlete	Event	Qualification		Final	
Athlete	Event	Score	Rank	Score	Rank
Dong Chao	R3 - 10 m air rifle prone SH1	632.7	8 Q	189.2	5
Yan Yaping	R3 - 10 m air rifle prone SH1	631.9	11	did not advance	
Zhang Cuiping	R3 - 10 m air rifle prone SH1	630.6	23	did not advance	
Dong Chao	R6 - 50 m air rifle prone SH1				
Yan Yaping	R6 - 50 m air rifle prone SH1				
Zhang Cuiping	R6 - 50 m air rifle prone SH1				
Huang Xing	P3 – 25 m pistol SH1	585	1 Q	27	1st place, gold medalist(s)
Yang Chao	P3 – 25 m pistol SH1	575	3 Q	5	7
Li Min	P3 – 25 m pistol SH1	551	19	did not advance	
Li Min	P4 – 50 m pistol SH1				
Lou Xialong	P4 – 50 m pistol SH1				
Yang Chao	P4 – 50 m pistol SH1				
Yuan Hongxiang	R5 – 10 m air rifle standing SH2	630.7	25	did not advance	
Yuan Hongxiang	R9 – 50 m rifle prone SH2				

== Sitting volleyball ==
China's men's and women's teams have booked a spot to compete for their country at the Summer Paralympics after their wins at the 2019 Asia Oceania Sitting Volleyball Championships in Thailand.

Summary

Team	Event	Group stage				Semifinal	Final / BM / Cl.	
Team	Event	Opposition Score	Opposition Score	Opposition Score	Rank	Opposition Score	Opposition Score	Rank
China men's	Men's tournament	Brazil; L 1–3	Germany; W 3–1	Iran; L 0–3	4	Did not advance	7th place match Japan; W 3–0	7
China women's	Women's tournament	RPC; W 3–0	United States; W 3–0	Rwanda; W 3–0	1	Canada; W 3–0	United States; L 1–3	2nd place, silver medalist(s)

=== Men's tournament ===
Group play

Pos	Team	Pld	W	L	Pts	SW	SL	SR	SPW	SPL	SPR	Qualification
1	Iran	3	3	0	3	9	0	MAX	225	177	1.271	Semifinals
2	Brazil	3	1	2	1	4	7	0.571	253	258	0.981	Semifinals
3	Germany	3	1	2	1	4	7	0.571	247	258	0.957	Fifth place match
4	China	3	1	2	1	4	7	0.571	241	273	0.883	Seventh place match

Source: TOCOG

28 August 2021; 18:30 v	Brazil	3–1	China	Makuhari Messe, Tokyo; Referees: Sari Mannersuo (FIN), Ritsuto Yamamichi (JPN)
28 August 2021; 18:30 v	(28–26, 26–28, 25–19, 25–13); Results Statistics			Makuhari Messe, Tokyo; Referees: Sari Mannersuo (FIN), Ritsuto Yamamichi (JPN)

30 August 2021; 14:00 v	Germany	1–3	China	Makuhari Messe, Tokyo; Referees: Kim Jong-heun (KOR), Sari Mannersuo (FIN)
30 August 2021; 14:00 v	(23–25, 25–23, 23–25, 23–25); Results Statistics			Makuhari Messe, Tokyo; Referees: Kim Jong-heun (KOR), Sari Mannersuo (FIN)

31 August 2021; 18:30 v	China	0–3	Iran	Makuhari Messe, Tokyo; Referees: Christina Fiebich (USA), Toomas Murulo (EST)
31 August 2021; 18:30 v	(21–25, 22–25, 14–25); Results Statistics			Makuhari Messe, Tokyo; Referees: Christina Fiebich (USA), Toomas Murulo (EST)

Seventh place match

2 September 2021; 13:30 v	Japan	0–3	China	Makuhari Messe, Tokyo; Referees: Ute Fischer (GER), Vanessa Redes (BRA)
2 September 2021; 13:30 v	(14–25, 18–25, 19–25); Results Statistics			Makuhari Messe, Tokyo; Referees: Ute Fischer (GER), Vanessa Redes (BRA)

=== Women's tournament ===
Group play

Pos	Team	Pld	W	L	Pts	SW	SL	SR	SPW	SPL	SPR	Qualification
1	China	3	3	0	3	9	0	MAX	226	137	1.650	Semifinals
2	United States	3	2	1	2	6	3	2.000	213	163	1.307	Semifinals
3	RPC	3	1	2	1	3	6	0.500	181	180	1.006	Fifth place match
4	Rwanda	3	0	3	0	0	9	0.000	85	225	0.378	Seventh place match

Source: TOCOG

28 August 2021; 20:30 v	China	3–0	RPC	Makuhari Messe, Tokyo; Referees: Benno Meijer (NED), Marie-Claude Richer (CAN)
28 August 2021; 20:30 v	(25–20, 25–16, 25–14); Results Statistics			Makuhari Messe, Tokyo; Referees: Benno Meijer (NED), Marie-Claude Richer (CAN)

30 August 2021; 18:30 v	United States	0–3	China	Makuhari Messe, Tokyo; Referees: Benno Meijer (NED), Haris Helac (BIH)
30 August 2021; 18:30 v	(17–25, 22–25, 24–26); Results Statistics			Makuhari Messe, Tokyo; Referees: Benno Meijer (NED), Haris Helac (BIH)

1 September 2021; 14:00 v	China	3–0	Rwanda	Makuhari Messe, Tokyo; Referees: Andre Calado (BRA), Ritsuto Yamamichi (JPN)
1 September 2021; 14:00 v	(25–6, 25–10, 25–8); Results Statistics			Makuhari Messe, Tokyo; Referees: Andre Calado (BRA), Ritsuto Yamamichi (JPN)

Semi-final

3 September 2021; 20:30 v	China	3–0	Canada	Makuhari Messe, Tokyo; Referees: Vanessa Redes (BRA), Ritsuto Yamamichi (JPN)
3 September 2021; 20:30 v	(25–18, 25–20, 25–15); Results Statistics			Makuhari Messe, Tokyo; Referees: Vanessa Redes (BRA), Ritsuto Yamamichi (JPN)

Gold medal match

5 September 2021; 10:00 v	(gold) United States	3–1	China (silver)	Makuhari Messe, Tokyo; Referees: Ebrahim Firouzi (IRI), Marie-Claude Richer (CAN)
5 September 2021; 10:00 v	(25–12, 25–20, 22–25, 25–19); Results Statistics			Makuhari Messe, Tokyo; Referees: Ebrahim Firouzi (IRI), Marie-Claude Richer (CAN)

== Swimming ==
China have earned fourteen slot allocations at the 2019 World Para Swimming Championships.

Men

Athlete	Event	Heats		Final	
Athlete	Event	Result	Rank	Result	Rank
Hua Dongdong	Men's 100m freestyle S11				
Jia Hongguang	Men's 50m butterfly S6			31.54	2nd place, silver medalist(s)
Li Junsheng	Men's 100m breaststroke SB5				
Liu Fengqi	Men's 100m freestyle S8	1:01.52	12	Did not advance	
Wang Jingang	Men's 50m butterfly S6			30.81	1st place, gold medalist(s)
Wang Jingang	Men's 200m individual medley SM6	2:50.23	8 Q	2:43.74	5
Wang Lichao	Men's 50m backstroke S5				
Wang Lichao	Men's 50m butterfly S5				
Wang Lichao	Men's 100m freestyle S5	1:15.88	6 Q	1:10.45	2nd place, silver medalist(s)
Xu Haijiao	Men's 50m freestyle S8	1:00.05	5 Q	58.75	4
Yang Bozun	Men's 100m breaststroke SB11				
Yang Guanglong	Men's 50m freestyle S8				
Yang Guanglong	Men's 200m individual medley SM8				
Yang Guanglong	Men's 100m freestyle S8	1:00.40	7 Q	59.42	6
Yang Hong	Men's 100m backstroke S6				
Yuan Weiyi	Men's 100m freestyle S5	1:12.66	1 Q	1:11.68	5
Zheng Tao	Men's 100m freestyle S5	1:13.83	4 Q	1:10.87	4
Zou Liankang	Men's 50m freestyle S3				
Zou Liankang	Men's 50m backstroke S3				

Women

Athlete	Event	Heats		Final	
Athlete	Event	Result	Rank	Result	Rank
Cai Liwen	Women's 400m freestyle S11	5:25.00	3 Q	5:07.56	3rd place, bronze medalist(s)
Cheng Jiao	Women's 200m individual medley SM5				
Jiang Yuyan	Women's 100m freestyle S7				
Jiang Yuyan	Women's 400m freestyle S6				
Jiang Yuyan	Women's 50m butterfly S6				
Li Guizhi	Women's 50 metre freestyle S11				
Liu Daomin	Women's 100m breaststroke SB6				
Ma Jia	Women's 50 metre freestyle S11				
Ma Jia	Women's 100m breaststroke SB11				
Ma Jia	Women's 200m individual medley SM11			2:42.14	1st place, gold medalist(s)
Song Lingling	Women's 100m backstroke S6				
Song Lingling	Women's 200m individual medley S6	DSQ		did not advance	
Wang Xinyi	Women's 100m backstroke S11				
Wang Xinyi	Women's 400m freestyle S11	5:32.06	5 Q	5:23.05	4
Zhang Li	Women's 200m freestyle S5	2:59.24	4 Q	2:46.53	1st place, gold medalist(s)
Zhang Li	Women's 100m freestyle S5	1:22.09	3 Q	1:17.80	2nd place, silver medalist(s)

Mixed

Athlete	Event	Heats		Final	
Athlete	Event	Result	Rank	Result	Rank
Zhang Li; Zheng Tao; Yuan Weiyi; Lu Dong	Mixed 4 × 50 metre freestyle relay 20pts	2:31.06	4 Q	2:15.49	1st place, gold medalist(s)

== Table tennis ==
China entered twenty-six athletes into the table tennis competition at the games. Twelve athletes qualified from 2019 ITTF African Para Championships which was held in Taichung, Taiwan and fourteen athletes via World Ranking allocation.

Men

Athlete	Event	Group Stage			Round of 16	Quarterfinals	Semifinals	Final	
Athlete	Event	Opposition Result	Opposition Result	Rank	Opposition Result	Opposition Result	Opposition Result	Opposition Result	Rank
Feng Panfeng	Individual C3	Orsi (ITA); W 3–0	Nalepka (POL); W 3–0	1 Q	Bye	Glinbancheun (THA); W 3–0	Van Emburgh (USA); W 3–0	Schmidberger (GER); W 3–2	1st place, gold medalist(s)
Zhai Xiang	Individual C3	Svatoš (CZE); W 3–0	Van Emburgh (USA); W 3–0	1 Q	Nalepka (POL); W 3–1	Merrien (FRA); W 3–2	Schmidberger (GER); L 0–3	Did not advance	3rd place, bronze medalist(s)
Zhao Ping	Individual C3	Judge (IRL); W 3–0	Knaf (BRA); W w/o	1 Q	Koleosho (NGR); W 3–1	Schmidberger (GER); L 0–3	did not advance		
Guo Xingyuan	Individual C4	Chaiwut (THA); L 2–3	Trávniček (SVK); L 2–3	3	did not advance				
Zhang Yan	Individual C4	Turan (TUR); L 2–3	Gonzalez (CHI); L 2–3	3	did not advance				
Cao Ningning	Individual C5	Çalışkan (TUR); W 3–0	Savant-Aira (FRA); W 3–0	1 Q	—N/a	Cheng (TPE); W 3–0	Öztürk (TUR); W 3–0	Baus (GER); W 3–2	1st place, gold medalist(s)
Chen Chao	Individual C6	Park (KOR); L 1–3	Hamadtou (EGY); W 3–0	2 Q	Chatzikyriakos (GRE); W 3–0	Rosenmeier (DEN); L 1–3	did not advance		
Yan Shuo	Individual C7								
Liao Keli	Individual C7								
Peng Weinan	Individual C8								
Ye Chaoqun	Individual C8								
Zhao Shuai	Individual C8								
Zhao Yi Qing	Individual C9								

Women

Athlete	Event	Group Stage				Round of 16	Quarterfinals	Semifinals	Final	
Athlete	Event	Opposition Result	Opposition Result	Opposition Result	Rank	Opposition Result	Opposition Result	Opposition Result	Opposition Result	Rank
Liu Jing	Individual C1-2	Prvulovic (SRB); W 3–0	Bootwansirina (THA); W 3–0	—N/a	1 Q	—N/a	Garrone (ARG); W 3–0	Pushpasheva (RPC); W 3–1	Seo (THA); W 3–1	1st place, gold medalist(s)
Li Qian	Individual C3	Patel (IND); W 3–2	Lee (KOR); L 0–3	—N/a	2 Q	Asayut (THA); L 1–3	did not advance			
Xue Juan	Individual C3	Dretar Karić (CRO); W 3–1	Duman (TUR); W 3–0	—N/a	1 Q	Bye	Asayut (THA); W 3–1	Yoon (KOR); W 3–2	Kánová (SVK); W 3–0	1st place, gold medalist(s)
Zhou Ying	Individual C4	Patel (IND); W 3–0	Shackleton (GBR); W 3–0	—N/a	1 Q	Bye	Matic (SRB); W 3–1	Gu (CHN); W 3–0	Patel (IND); W 3–0	1st place, gold medalist(s)
Gu Xiaodan	Individual C4	Oliveira (BRA); W 3–2	Elelimat (JOR); W 3–0	—N/a	1 Q	Bye	Lu (TPE); W 3–1	Zhou (CHN); L 0–3	Did not advance	3rd place, bronze medalist(s)
Zhang Miao	Individual C4	Jaion (THA); W 3–2	Vasileva (RPC); W 3–0	—N/a	1 Q	Bye	Mikolaschek (SRB); W 3–1	Patel (IND); L 2–3	Did not advance	3rd place, bronze medalist(s)
Zhang Bian	Individual C5	Mahmoud (EGY); W 3–0	Lundback (SWE); W 3–1	—N/a	1 Q	—N/a	Bye	Jung (KOR); W 3–0	Pan (CHN); W 3–2	1st place, gold medalist(s)
Pan Jiamin	Individual C5	Leonelli (CHI); W 3–0	Jung (KOR); L 2–3	—N/a	2 Q	—N/a	Lundback (SWE); W 3–2	Abuawad (JOR); W 3–1	Zhang (CHN); L 2–3	2nd place, silver medalist(s)
Wang Rui	Individual C7	dos Santos (BRA); W 3–0	Kim (KOR); W 3–0	—N/a	1 Q	—N/a	Safonova (RPC); L 0–3	did not advance		
Mao Jingdian	Individual C8	Tomono (JPN); W 3–0	Wolf (GER); W 3–0	—N/a	1 Q	—N/a	Bye	Dahlen (NOR); W 3–2	Huang (CHN); W 3–1	1st place, gold medalist(s)
Huang Wenjuan	Individual C8	Dahlen (NOR); W 3–2	Rodrigues Lacerda (BRA); W 3–1	—N/a	1 Q	—N/a	Tomono (JPN); W 3–0	Kamkasomphou (FRA); W 3–1	Mao (CHN); L 1–3	2nd place, silver medalist(s)
Xiong Guiyan	Individual C9	Kavas (TUR); W 3–1	Szvitacs (HUN); W 3–0	Rauen (BRA); W 3–0	1 Q	—N/a		Pęk (POL); W 3–1	Lina (AUS); W 3–2	2nd place, silver medalist(s)
Zhao Xiaojing	Individual C10	Yang (AUS); L 2–3	Obazuaye (NGR); W 3–0	Tien (TPE); L 0–3	3	—N/a	did not advance			

== Taekwondo ==
China qualified one athletes to compete at the Paralympics competition. Li Yujie will compete after placing second in world ranking, to booked one of six available place.

Athlete	Event	First round	Quarterfinals	Semifinals	Final / BM	
Athlete	Event	Opposition Result	Opposition Result	Opposition Result	Opposition Result	Rank
Li Yujie	Women's −58 kg	Bye	Mičev (SRB); W 23–17	Munro (GBR); L 25–35	Goverdhan (NEP); W 12–0	3rd place, bronze medalist(s)

== Wheelchair basketball ==
=== Women's tournament ===
Roster

The following is the China roster in the women's wheelchair basketball tournament of the 2020 Summer Paralympics.

China women's national wheelchair basketball team - 2020 Summer Paralympics roster
Players
Coaches

No.	Name	Age – Date of birth	Pts.
5	Xuejing Chen	27 – 1 September 1993	1.0
6	Xuemei Zhang	27 – 25 October 1993	4.0
7	Tonglei Zhang	27 – 5 September 1993	1.0
8	Guidi Lyu	28 – 6 May 1993	4.0
9	Suiling Lin	30 – 26 February 1991	3.0
10	Xiaolian Huang	30 – 20 September 1990	2.0
11	Jiameng Dai	26 – 7 July 1995	4.5
12	Tianjiao Lei	27 – 31 October 1993	4.5
13	Wenli Chen	31 – 4 May 1990	1.5
15	Yan Yang	23 – 2 July 1998	4.0
16	Mingzhu Deng	33 – 10 November 1987	2.0
23	Meier Chen	30 – 10 September 1990	1.5

Head coach

Qi Chen

Assistant coach(es)

Yan Han

Legend

- Age - describes age on 24 August 2021

Groupstage

Pos	Team	Pld	W	L	PF	PA	PD	Pts	Qualification
1	China	4	4	0	207	133	+74	8	Quarter-finals
2	Netherlands	4	3	1	278	145	+133	7	Quarter-finals
3	United States	4	2	2	229	165	+64	6	Quarter-finals
4	Spain	4	1	3	167	185	−18	5	Quarter-finals
5	Algeria	4	0	4	72	325	−253	4	9th/10th place playoff

Source: TOCOG
Rules for classification: 1) Points; 2) Head-to-head results; 3) Points difference; 4) Points scored.

25 August 2021
9:00

Report

Algeria	25–74	China
Scoring by quarter: 13–19, 6–23, 2–24, 4–8
Pts: Khemgani 13; Rebs: Zairi 7 Asts: Abdelali 3		Pts: Zhang X. 20; Rebs: Lyu 6 Asts: Lin 10

Musashino Forest Sport Plaza
Referees: Alexandre Lapoint

26 August 2021
20:30

Report

China	45–38	Netherlands
Scoring by quarter: 10–9, 8–15, 8–0, 19–14
Pts: Lin 17; Rebs: Zhang X. 15; Asts: Lin, Zhang X. 4		Pts: Korver 12; Rebs: Beijer 7 Asts: Korver 4

Ariake Arena
Referees: Helen Rosenberg

28 August 2021
9:00

Report

United States	41–42	China
Scoring by quarter: 12–2, 9–5, 6–14, 14–21
Pts: Zurbrugg 15; Rebs: Ryan 9 Asts: Hollermann 7		Pts: Zhang X. 15; Rebs: Dai 10; Asts: Lin 7

Musashino Forest Sport Plaza
Attendance: 830
Referees: Hsieh Shu-fei

27 August 2021
17:00

Report

Spain	29–46	China
Scoring by quarter: 6–16, 10–8, 7–12, 6–10
Pts: Alonso 9 Rebs: Montiel 8 Asts: Zudaire 4		Pts: Lin, Huang 11; Rebs: Zhang X. 9 Asts: Lin 5

Musashino Forest Sport Plaza
Attendance: 8
Referees: Geghard Tahmasian

Quarterfinal

31 August 2021
18:15

Report

China	47–33	Great Britain
Scoring by quarter: 14–5, 13–9, 11–10, 9–9
Pts: Lin 13; Rebs: Lyu 14; Asts: Lin 10		Pts: Freeman 10; Rebs: Freeman 10; Asts: Love 3

Ariake Arena
Referees: Adam Fronczak

Semifinal

2 September 2021
20:45

Report

United States	36–41	China
Scoring by quarter: 9–6, 6–14, 8–7, 13–14
Pts: Hollermann 13; Rebs: Schneider 10; Asts: Hollermann, Ryan 5		Pts: Zhang T. 13; Rebs: Lin, Lyu 8 Asts: Lin 5

Ariake Arena
Attendance: 279
Referees: Tomas Pajer

Gold medal match

4 September 2021
20:30

Report

(gold) Netherlands	50–31	China (silver)
Scoring by quarter: 9–12, 12–2, 12–6, 17–11
Pts: Kramer 15; Rebs: Kramer 9 Asts: Kramer, Visser 5		Pts: Lin 9 Rebs: Zhang X. 11; Asts: Zhang T. 5

Ariake Arena
Attendance: 30
Referees: Linas Radykas

== Wheelchair tennis ==
China qualified five players entries for wheelchair tennis. All of them qualified by the world rankings.

Athlete	Event	Round of 64	Round of 32	Round of 16	Quarterfinals	Semifinals	Final / BM	
Athlete	Event	Opposition Result	Opposition Result	Opposition Result	Opposition Result	Opposition Result	Opposition Result	Rank
Ji Zhenxu	Men's singles	Legner (AUT); W 6–1, 6–0	Scheffers (NED); W 6–3, 6–3	Kunieda (JPN); L 0–6, 1–6	did not advance			
Huang Huimin	Women's singles	—N/a	Khanthasit (THA); L 2–6, 4–6	did not advance				
Huang Jinlian	Women's singles	—N/a	Kaiser (USA); W 6–1, 6–1	de Groot (NED); L 0–6, 2–6	did not advance			
Wang Ziying	Women's singles	—N/a	Buob (SUI); W 6–1, 6–0	Montjane (RSA); W 6–2, 6–3	van Koot (NED); L 6–7, 6–2, 2–6	did not advance		
Zhu Zhenzhen	Women's singles	—N/a	Martínez (COL); W 6–0, 6–0	Shuker (GBR); W 7–6, 6–3	Kamiji (JPN); L 5–7, 1–6	did not advance		
Huang Huimin; Huang Jinlian	Women's doubles	—N/a		Caldeira / Duval (BRA); W 6–0, 6–0	Kamiji / Ohtani (JPN); L 0–6, 0–6	did not advance		
Wang Ziying; Zhu Zhenzhen	Women's doubles	—N/a		Baron / Mathewson (USA); W 6–1, 6–0	Takamuro / Tanaka (JPN); W 6–2, 6–1	Shuker / Whiley (GBR); L 4–6, 2–6	Kamiji / Ohtani (JPN); L 2–6, 6–7	4

== See also ==
- China at the Paralympics
- China at the 2020 Summer Olympics
