= Wheelchair fencing at the 2016 Summer Paralympics =

Wheelchair fencing at the XV Paralympic Games
- Venue: Carioca Arena 3
- Dates: 12–16 September 2016
- Competitors: 88

Wheelchair fencing at the 2016 Summer Paralympics was held in Rio de Janeiro from 4 September to 8 September 2016.

== Classification ==
Fencers are given a classification depending on the type and extent of their disability. The classification system allows fencers to compete against others with a similar level of function. Fencing has two ability classes, A and B, two genders and three weapons, epee, foil and sabre. Wheelchairs were anchored to the ground during competition.

== Medal summary ==
=== Medal table ===
Rank	Nation	Gold	Silver	Bronze	Total
1	China (CHN)	9	4	4	17
2	Ukraine (UKR)	2	0	2	4
3	France (FRA)	1	0	2	3
4	Italy (ITA)	1	0	1	2
5	Belarus (BLR)	1	0	0	1
6	Hungary (HUN)	0	3	2	5
7	Hong Kong (HKG)	0	2	1	3
8	Poland (POL)	0	1	2	3
9	Great Britain (GBR)	0	1	0	1
9	Greece (GRE)	0	1	0	1
9	Iraq (IRQ)	0	1	0	1
9	Thailand (THA)	0	1	0	1
Totals (12 entries)		14	14	14	42

== Events ==
Twelve events will be competed at the games, six for individual men plus a team events, four for women (who do not take part in an individual sabre event) and a team event.

=== Men's events ===
Event	Class	Gold	Silver	Bronze
Individual épée	A	Sun Gang; China	Piers Gilliver; Great Britain	Tian Jianquan; China
Individual épée	B	Andrei Pranevich; Belarus	Ammar Ali; Iraq	Oleg Naumenko; Ukraine
Team épée	A–B	France; Robert Citerne; Yannick Ifebe; Romain Noble	China; Tian Jianquan; Sun Gang; Hu Daoliang	Poland; Dariusz Pender; Michal Nalewajek; Kamil Rzasa
Individual foil	A	Ye Ruyi; China	Richárd Osváth; Hungary	Sun Gang; China
Individual foil	B	Feng Yanke; China	Hu Daoliang; China	Maxime Valet; France
Team foil	A–B	China; Ye Ruyi; Sun Gang; Hu Daoliang	Poland; Jacek Gaworski; Dariusz Pender; Michał Nalewajek	France; Ludovic Lemoine; Damien Tokatlian; Maxime Valet
Individual sabre	A	Andrii Demchuk; Ukraine	Richárd Osváth; Hungary	Tian Jianquan; China
Individual sabre	B	Anton Datsko; Ukraine	Panagiotis Triantafyllou; Greece	Adrian Castro; Poland

=== Women's events ===
Event	Class	Gold	Silver	Bronze
Individual épée	A	Zou Xufeng; China	Bian Jing; China	Yevheniia Breus; Ukraine
Individual épée	B	Zhou Jingjing; China	Saysunee Jana; Thailand	Chan Yui Chong; Hong Kong
Team épée	A–B	China; Zou Xufeng; Zhou Jingjing; Rong Jing	Hong Kong; Chan Yui Chong; Justine Charissa Ng; Yu Chui Yee	Hungary; Gyöngyi Dani; Amarilla Veres; Zsuzsanna Krajnyák
Individual foil	A	Rong Jing; China	Yu Chui Yee; Hong Kong	Zsuzsanna Krajnyák; Hungary
Individual foil	B	Beatrice Vio; Italy	Zhou Jingjing; China	Yao Fang; China
Team foil	A–B	China; Zhou Jingjing; Rong Jing; Zhang Chuncui	Hungary; Gyöngyi Dani; Éva Hajmási; Zsuzsanna Krajnyák	Italy; Beatrice Vio; Andreea Mogoș; Loredana Trigilia
