= Aphinya Thongdaeng =

Thai wheelchair fencer (born 2003)

Personal information
- Native name: อภิญญา ทองแดง
- Nationality: Thailand
- Born: 1 March 2003 (age 23) Sisaket, Thailand

Sport
- Sport: Wheelchair fencing
- Disability class: A
Medal record
Women's wheelchair fencing
Representing Thailand
Paralympic Games
Bronze medal – third place	2024 Paris	Team épée

Aphinya Thongdaeng (Thai: อภิญญา ทองแดง; born 1 March 2003) is a Thai wheelchair fencer. She represented Thailand at the 2024 Summer Paralympics, where she won a bronze medal in the women's team épée event.

== Career ==
At the 2024 Asian and Oceanian Championships in Nakhon Ratchasima, Thongdaeng was part of the Thailand women's épée team alongside Saysunee Jana and Duean Nakprasit. The team reached the final, where they were defeated by South Korea.

Thongdaeng represented Thailand at the 2024 Summer Paralympics in Paris. She competed in the women's foil category A, the women's épée category A, and team events. In the women's épée category A, she reached repechage round 3 after defeating Brianna Vide of France in repechage round 2.

In the women's team épée event, Thongdaeng, Saysunee Jana and Duean Nakprasit won the bronze medal for Thailand. Thailand defeated France 45–40 in the bronze medal bout.
