= Nadiia Doloh =

Ukrainian wheelchair fencer (born 1986)

Personal information
- Born: 10 June 1986 (age 40) Tarasivka, Ukraine

Sport
- Sport: Wheelchair fencing
- Disability class: B
Medal record
Women's wheelchair fencing
Representing Ukraine
Paralympic Games
Silver medal – second place	2024 Paris	Épée team

Nadiia Doloh (born 10 June 1986) is a Ukrainian wheelchair fencer.

== Career ==
Doloh represented Ukraine at the 2024 Summer Paralympics and won a silver medal in the épée team event.
