= Wheelchair fencing at the 2016 Summer Paralympics – Men's épée A =

== Final rounds ==
The final rounds were held as a single elimination knockout, with the losers of the semi-finals playing off for the bronze medals. Scoring was up to 15.

Quarterfinals
1	Sun Gang (CHN)	15
8	Dariusz Pender (POL)	10
4	Tian Jianquan (CHN)	15
5	Romain Nble (FRA)	6
3	Z Al-Madhkhoori (IRQ)	15
6	Robert Citerne (FRA)	12
7	Matteo Betti (ITA)	11
2	Piers Gilliver (GBR)	15

Semifinals
1	Sun Gang (CHN)	15
4	Tian Jianquan (CHN)	11
3	Z Al-Madhkhoori (IRQ)	10
2	Piers Gilliver (GBR)	15

Final
1	Sun Gang (CHN)	15
2	Piers Gilliver (GBR)	13
Third place
4	Tian Jianquan (CHN)	15
3	Z Al-Madhkhoori (IRQ)	11

== Pool matches ==
Preliminary rounds were held on a round robin basis in two pools of 6 fencers. The top four qualifiers from each pool took a quarterfinal place, and pool matches were scored up to five points.

Men's Individual Épée - Category A - Pool 1^{[a]}
Seed	Name	Hand	NPC								Pool Rank
Piste: 7				Start Time: 09:00							Pool Rank
Piste: 7				No.	Hungary	France	United Kingdom	Brazil	Poland	People's Republic of China	Pool Rank
1	Piers Gilliver	R	Great Britain	3	V5	V5		V5	V5	V5	1 Q
3	Tian Jianquan	R	China	6	V5	V5	D2	V5	V5		2 Q
7	Robert Citerne	L	France	2	V5		D0	V5	V5	D3	3 Q
5	Dariusz Pender	R	Poland	5	D3	D2	D4	V5		D4	4 Q
9	Gyula Mato	L	Hungary	1		D4	D2	D4	V5	D1	5
12	Sandro Colaco	R	Brazil	4	V5	D4	D0		D0	D1	6

Men's Individual Epeé Category A - Pool 2
Seed	Name	Hand	NPC								Pool Rank
Piste: 8				Start Time: 09:00							Pool Rank
Piste: 8				No.	Italy	Canada	Iraq	People's Republic of China	France	Brazil	Pool Rank
2	Sun Gang	L	China	4	V5	V5	V5		V5	V5	1 Q
8	Z Al-Madhkhoori	R	Iraq	3	V5	V5		D3	V5	V5	2 Q
4	Romain Noble	L	France	5	V5	V5	D1	D0		V5	3 Q
6	Matteo Betti	L	Italy	1		V5	D0	D1	D3	V5	4 Q
11	Matthieu Hebert	R	Canada	2	D4		D1	D2	D1	V5	5
10	FL Damasceno	R	Brazil	6	D2	D1	D0	D1	D1		6

^{↑}V5: victory D1 - D4: Defeat, scoring 1 to 4.
