= Michał Dąbrowski =

Polish wheelchair fencer (1986–2024)

Personal information
- Nickname: "Misio"
- Born: 2 April 1986 Warsaw, Poland
- Died: 13 November 2024 (aged 38) Warsaw, Poland

Fencing career
- Sport: Fencing
- Weapon: Épée B / Sabre B
- Disability class: B
Medal record
Wheelchair fencing
Representing Poland
Summer Paralympics
Silver medal – second place	2024 Paris	Sabre B
Bronze medal – third place	2024 Paris	Épée B
IWAS World Championships
Bronze medal – third place	2023 Terni	Epée B
Bronze medal – third place	2023 Terni	Sabre B
IWAS European Championships
Bronze medal – third place	2022 Warsaw	Sabre B
Bronze medal – third place	2022 Warsaw	Épée B
Bronze medal – third place	2022 Warsaw	Team Foil

Michał Dąbrowski (2 April 1986 – 13 November 2024) was a Polish wheelchair fencer who competed in both épée and sabre B. At the 2024 Summer Paralympics, he won the silver medal in the individual sabre B classification and bronze in the épée B event.

== Biography ==
Dąbrowski competed in the 2022 European Championships, where he won three bronze medals. He then won two bronze medals at the 2023 World Championships. In November 2023, Dąbrowski was diagnosed with bile duct cancer, which he received treatment for. Despite this, he was able to compete in the 2024 Summer Paralympics and on 3 September, he won the silver medal in the individual sabre B event, in which he lost to Feng Yanke in the gold medal match. Three days later, he competed in the épée B event, where he lost to Dimitri Coutya in the semifinals. After getting pass the repechage round, however, he won the bronze medal by defeating Zhang Jie.

On 13 November 2024, a day after receiving the Order of Polonia Restituta, Dąbrowski died from bile duct cancer at the age of 38.
