= Saysunee Jana =

Thai wheelchair fencer (born 1974)

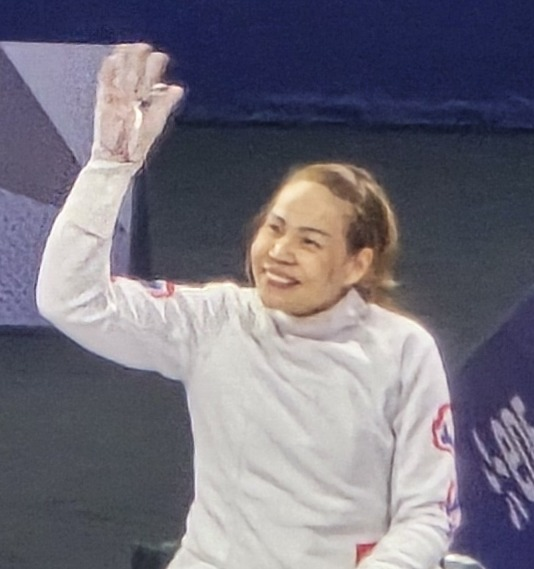
- Jana competing at the 2024 Summer Paralympics

Personal information
- Born: 15 June 1974 (age 52) Chiang Mai, Thailand

Fencing career
- Sport: Fencing
- Country: Thailand
- Weapon: Épée, Foil and Sabre
- Disability class: B
Medal record
Event	1st	2nd	3rd
Paralympic Games	5	1	4
World Championships	6	3	4
Asian Para Games	5	10	8
ASEAN Para Games	3	0	0
Paralympic Games
Gold medal – first place	2004 Athens	Épée B
Gold medal – first place	2012 London	Épée B
Gold medal – first place	2024 Paris	Épée B
Gold medal – first place	2024 Paris	Foil B
Gold medal – first place	2024 Paris	Sabre B
Silver medal – second place	2016 Rio de Janeiro	Épée B
Bronze medal – third place	2004 Athens	Foil B
Bronze medal – third place	2008 Beijing	Épée B
Bronze medal – third place	2020 Tokyo	Épée B
Bronze medal – third place	2024 Paris	Épée team
World Championships
Gold medal – first place	2010 Paris	Épée B
Gold medal – first place	2011 Catania	Épée B
Gold medal – first place	2013 Budapest	Épée B
Gold medal – first place	2015 Eger	Épée B
Gold medal – first place	2023 Terni	Épée B
Gold medal – first place	2025 Iksan	Épée B
Silver medal – second place	2017 Rome	Sabre B
Silver medal – second place	2017 Rome	Épée B
Silver medal – second place	2023 Terni	Épée team
Bronze medal – third place	2010 Paris	Foil B
Bronze medal – third place	2011 Catania	Foil B
Bronze medal – third place	2019 Cheongju	Foil B
Bronze medal – third place	2023 Terni	Foil B
Asian Para Games
Gold medal – first place	2010 Guangzhou	Épée B
Gold medal – first place	2018 Jakarta	Épée B
Gold medal – first place	2022 Hangzhou	Épée B
Gold medal – first place	2026 Aichi–Nagoya	Sabre B
Gold medal – first place	2026 Aichi–Nagoya	Sabre mixed team
Silver medal – second place	2018 Jakarta	Foil B
Silver medal – second place	2018 Jakarta	Sabre B
Silver medal – second place	2018 Jakarta	Sabre team
Silver medal – second place	2022 Hangzhou	Sabre B
Silver medal – second place	2022 Hangzhou	Foil B
Silver medal – second place	2022 Hangzhou	Épée team
Silver medal – second place	2022 Hangzhou	Sabre team
Silver medal – second place	2026 Aichi–Nagoya	Foil B
Silver medal – second place	2026 Aichi–Nagoya	Foil mixed team
Silver medal – second place	2026 Aichi–Nagoya	Épée B
Bronze medal – third place	2010 Guangzhou	Foil B
Bronze medal – third place	2018 Jakarta	Épée team
Bronze medal – third place	2018 Jakarta	Foil team
Bronze medal – third place	2022 Hangzhou	Foil team
Bronze medal – third place	2026 Aichi–Nagoya	Foil team
Bronze medal – third place	2026 Aichi–Nagoya	Épée team
Bronze medal – third place	2026 Aichi–Nagoya	Épée mixed team
Bronze medal – third place	2026 Aichi–Nagoya	Sabre team
ASEAN Para Games
Gold medal – first place	2025 Nakhon Ratchasima	Sabre B
Gold medal – first place	2025 Nakhon Ratchasima	Foil B
Gold medal – first place	2025 Nakhon Ratchasima	Mixed team épée

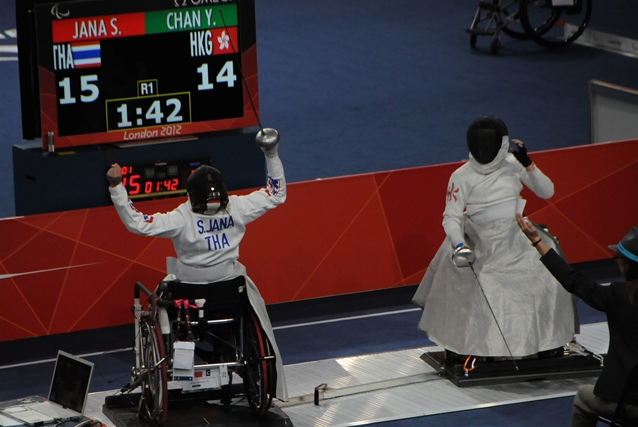
Jana celebrating after winning the semi-final at the 2012 Summer Paralympics in London.

Saysunee Jana (Thai: สายสุนีย์ จ๊ะนะ, RTGS: Saisuni Chana; born 15 June 1974) is a Thai wheelchair fencer. She became Thailand's first female Paralympic gold medalist when she won the Épée B event at the 2004 Athens Paralympics. She has won five gold, one silver, and four bronze medals in total from six appearances at the Paralympic Games. At the 2024 Paris Paralympics, she became the first female wheelchair fencer to win individual gold medals in all three weapons (sabre, foil, and épée) at a single Games.

Jana was born in Chiang Mai. At age 17, she was involved in a motorcycle accident that left her legs paralyzed. After undergoing rehabilitation, she began her career in wheelchair fencing, eventually becoming a multiple-time World Champion. Beyond sports, she serves as an advocate for the United Nations Population Fund (UNFPA), promoting bodily autonomy and the rights of persons with disabilities.

== Early life and initial sports career ==
Jana was born and raised in Chiang Mai, Thailand. In her youth, she worked in a factory to help support her family. When she was 17, Jana was involved in a motorcycle crash where her vehicle was struck by a 10-wheel truck. The accident resulted in a severe spinal cord injury that left both of her legs paralysed.

She subsequently attended the Yadfon Vocational Rehabilitation Center for Persons with Disabilities in Chiang Mai, where she was introduced to para-sports. She initially played wheelchair basketball and earned a spot on the Thai national team. However, a coach noticed her long arms and powerful upper body, encouraging her to transition to wheelchair fencing. Jana made her international debut in fencing at the 1999 FESPIC Games in Thailand, where she won two gold medals. The prize money from this tournament helped clear her family's debts and marked the beginning of her professional career.

== Fencing career ==
=== 2004–2020: First Paralympic gold and sustained success ===
Jana made her Paralympic debut at the 2004 Paralympics, winning a gold medal in the Épée B event and a bronze medal in the Foil B event. This achievement made her Thailand’s first female Paralympic gold medalist. For nearly two decades, she maintained an elite standing in the Épée B category, earning a reputation for her resilience and consistent podium finishes. She won a bronze medal in 2008, followed by a second Paralympic gold at the 2012 London Games.

Her medal streak continued with a silver in 2016 and a bronze in 2020, solidifying her status as one of the most decorated athletes in Thai history. To maintain this longevity, Jana adheres to a rigorous training regimen, reportedly executing between 2,000 and 3,000 thrusts daily to combat muscle fatigue and injury. She also served as Thailand’s flag bearer at the opening ceremonies of the 2012 Paralympics in London and the 2024 Paralympics in Paris.

=== 2024–present: Historic triple Paralympic gold and regional success ===
At the 2024 Summer Paralympics in Paris, the 50-year-old Jana won three gold medals in the individual sabre B, foil B, and épée B events, along with a bronze medal in the épée team event. She secured her third individual gold by defeating Kang Su of China in the épée final. Jana noted that the achievement exceeded her initial expectations, as she had primarily anticipated winning gold in her specialty, the épée discipline. This sweep made her the first female wheelchair fencer to win individual gold medals across all three disciplines at a single Paralympics, and the second athlete overall to do so after Roberto Marson in 1968.

In January 2026, Jana competed at the 2025 ASEAN Para Games in Nakhon Ratchasima, Thailand. Despite her international record, this was her first medal at the ASEAN Para Games as her specific classification events were previously not included in the program. She won three gold medals in the individual sabre B, individual foil B, and mixed team épée events.

== Personal life and advocacy ==
Jana is married to a fellow wheelchair user, and they have one daughter. She earned a bachelor's degree in Business administration from Rattana Bundit University.

Beyond her athletic career, Jana is an advocate for the United Nations Population Fund (UNFPA) as an Advocate for Inclusive Population and Development. She frequently uses her personal experience of choosing to have a child at the age of 40—despite medical advice to terminate the pregnancy due to high-risk health factors—to promote bodily autonomy and the right of persons with disabilities to access healthcare and make family planning decisions with dignity.

== Awards and honours ==
- 2008: Outstanding Athlete with a Disability Award, presented by the Sports Reporters Association of Thailand.
- 2010: Outstanding Female Athlete with a Disability Award, on National Sports Day.
- 2026: Named one of the "Women of the Year" by the Bangkok Post.

== Royal decorations ==
- 2007 – Member (Third Class) of The Most Admirable Order of the Direkgunabhorn
