= Wheelchair fencing at the 2024 Summer Paralympics =

Wheelchair fencing at the XVII Paralympic Games
- Paralympic Wheelchair Fencing
- Venue: Grand Palais
- Dates: 3–7 September 2024
- Competitors: 97 from 22 nations

Wheelchair fencing at the 2024 Summer Paralympics in Paris, France were held between 3 and 7 September. There was a total of sixteen events: eight events each for men and women. They were categories A and B and will use épée, foil and sabre swords in individual events and épée and foil in team events.

== Qualification ==
An NPC can enter a maximum of two eligible fencers per individual event. Eligible fencers must at least compete in three international sanctioned IWAS Wheelchair Fencing competitions between 1 October 2022 to 31 May 2024.

=== Competitions ===
| Competition | Date | Venue |
|---|---|---|
| 2022 IWAS Wheelchair Fencing Americas Championships | 22–25 October 2022 | (Brazil) São Paulo |
| 2022 IWAS Wheelchair Fencing World Cup | 17–20 November 2022 | (Hungary) Eger |
| 2022 IWAS Wheelchair Fencing European Championships | 29 November 2022 – 4 December 2022 | (Poland) Warsaw |
| 2023 IWAS Wheelchair Fencing World Cup | 14–17 January 2023 | (United States) Washington D.C. |
| 2023 IWAS Wheelchair Fencing World Cup | 16–19 March 2023 | (Italy) Pisa |
| 2023 IWAS Wheelchair Fencing World Cup | 20–23 April 2023 | (France) Nîmes |
| 2023 IWAS Wheelchair Fencing World Cup | 6–9 July 2023 | (Poland) Warsaw |
| 2023 IWAS Wheelchair Fencing World Cup | 4–6 August 2023 | (Brazil) São Paulo |
| 2023 IWAS Wheelchair Fencing World Cup | 2–5 September 2023 | (South Korea) Busan |
| 2023 IWAS Wheelchair Fencing World Championships | 2–8 October 2023 | (Italy) Terni |
| 2023 IWAS Wheelchair Fencing Asian Championships | 23–28 October 2023 | (China) Hangzhou |
| 2023 IWAS Wheelchair Fencing World Cup | 5–8 December 2023 | (Thailand) Nakhon Ratchasima |
| 2024 IWAS Wheelchair World Cup | 11–14 January 2024 | (United Kingdom) Cardiff |
| 2024 IWAS Wheelchair World Cup | 23–26 May 2024 | (Brazil) São Paulo |
| 2024 IWAS Wheelchair Fencing European Zonals | 5–10 March 2024 | (France) Paris |
| 2024 IWAS Wheelchair Fencing Asian Zonals | 24–28 April 2024 | (Thailand) Pattaya |
| 2024 IWAS Wheelchair Fencing Americas Zonals | 8–12 May 2024 | (Costa Rica) San Jose |

=== Quotas ===
Maximum entries per medal event as follows.

| Event | Male | Female |
|---|---|---|
| Épée A | 21 | 21 |
| Épée B | 21 | 21 |
| Épée team | 12 | 12 |
| Foil A | 21 | 21 |
| Foil B | 21 | 21 |
| Foil team | 12 | 12 |
| Sabre A | 21 | 21 |
| Sabre B | 21 | 21 |

== Medal table ==
* Host nation (France)

| Rank | NPC | Gold | Silver | Bronze | Total |
|---|---|---|---|---|---|
| 1 | China | 10 | 5 | 4 | 19 |
| 2 | Thailand | 3 | 1 | 1 | 5 |
| 3 | Great Britain | 2 | 3 | 1 | 6 |
| 4 | Germany | 1 | 0 | 0 | 1 |
| 5 | Poland | 0 | 2 | 1 | 3 |
| 6 | Italy | 0 | 1 | 3 | 4 |
| 7 | Ukraine | 0 | 1 | 2 | 3 |
| 8 | Hungary | 0 | 1 | 0 | 1 |
| 8 | Iraq | 0 | 1 | 0 | 1 |
| 8 | South Korea | 0 | 1 | 0 | 1 |
| 11 | France* | 0 | 0 | 1 | 1 |
| 11 | Georgia | 0 | 0 | 1 | 1 |
| 11 | Spain | 0 | 0 | 1 | 1 |
| 11 | Turkey | 0 | 0 | 1 | 1 |
| Totals (14 entries) | | 16 | 16 | 16 | 48 |

== Medalists ==
=== Men's events ===
| Event | Class | Gold | Silver | Bronze |
|---|---|---|---|---|
| Individual épée | A | Sun Gang; China | Piers Gilliver; Great Britain | Hakan Akkaya; Turkey |
| Individual épée | B | Dimitri Coutya; Great Britain | Visit Kingmanaw; Thailand | Michał Dąbrowski; Poland |
| Team épée | A–B | China; Tian Jianquan; Sun Gang; Zhang Jie; Zhong Saichun | Iraq; Zainulabdeen Al-Madhkhoori; Ammar Ali; Hayder Al-Ogaili | Great Britain; Piers Gilliver; Dimitri Coutya; Oliver Lam-Watson |
| Individual foil | A | Sun Gang; China | Matteo Betti; Italy | Zhong Saichun; China |
| Individual foil | B | Dimitri Coutya; Great Britain | Feng Yanke; China | Hu Daoliang; China |
| Team foil | A–B | China; Sun Gang; Feng Yanke; Zhong Saichun; Tian Jianquan | Great Britain; Oliver Lam-Watson; Piers Gilliver; Dimitri Coutya | France; Ludovic Lemoine; Damien Tokatlian; Maxime Valet; Yohan Peter |
| Individual sabre | A | Maurice Schmidt; Germany | Piers Gilliver; Great Britain | Edoardo Giordan; Italy |
| Individual sabre | B | Feng Yanke; China | Michał Dąbrowski; Poland | Zhang Jie; China |

=== Women's events ===
| Event | Class | Gold | Silver | Bronze |
|---|---|---|---|---|
| Individual épée | A | Chen Yuandong; China | Kwon Hyo Kyeong; South Korea | Gu Haiyan; China |
| Individual épée | B | Saysunee Jana; Thailand | Kang Su; China | Olena Fedota-Isaieva; Ukraine |
| Team épée | A–B | China; Gu Haiyan; Zou Xufeng; Kang Su; Chen Yuandong | Ukraine; Yevheniia Breus; Olena Fedota-Isaieva; Nataliia Morkvych; Nadiia Doloh | Thailand; Aphinya Thongdaeng; Duean Nakprasit; Saysunee Jana |
| Individual foil | A | Zou Xufeng; China | Gu Haiyan; China | Judith Rodríguez Menéndez; Spain |
| Individual foil | B | Saysunee Jana; Thailand | Xiao Rong; China | Beatrice Vio; Italy |
| Team foil | A–B | China; Chen Yuandong; Gu Haiyan; Xiao Rong; Zou Xufeng | Hungary; Éva Hajmási; Zsuzsanna Krajnyák; Boglárka Mező; Amarilla Veres | Italy; Andreea Mogoș; Rossana Pasquino; Loredana Trigilia; Beatrice Vio |
| Individual sabre | A | Gu Haiyan; China | Kinga Dróżdż; Poland | Nino Tibilashvili; Georgia |
| Individual sabre | B | Saysunee Jana; Thailand | Xiao Rong; China | Olena Fedota-Isaieva; Ukraine |

== See also ==
- Fencing at the 2024 Summer Olympics
