= Hayder Al-Ogaili =

Iraqi wheelchair fencer (born 1994)

Personal information
- Native name: حيدر العكيلي
- Born: 1 April 1994 (age 32)

Sport
- Country: Iraq
- Sport: Wheelchair fencing
- Disability class: A
Medal record
Men's wheelchair fencing
Representing Iraq
Paralympic Games
Silver medal – second place	2024 Paris	Team épée
Asian Para Games
Silver medal – second place	2018 Jakarta	Team épée
Silver medal – second place	2018 Jakarta	Team foil
Bronze medal – third place	2014 Incheon	Team épée
Bronze medal – third place	2014 Incheon	Team foil

Hayder Al-Ogaili (born 1 April 1994) is an Iraqi wheelchair fencer.

== Career ==
Al-Ogaili represented Iraq at the 2024 Summer Paralympics and won a silver medal in the épée team event.
