= Wheelchair fencing at the 2018 Asian Para Games =

- Venue: POPKI Sports Hall
- Location: Jakarta, Indonesia
- Dates: 7–11 October

Wheelchair fencing at the 2018 Asian Para Games was held in Jakarta between 7 and 11 October 2018.

== Medal table ==
* Host nation (Indonesia)

Rank	NPC	Gold	Silver	Bronze	Total
1	China (CHN)	16	5	3	24
2	Thailand (THA)	1	5	3	9
3	Hong Kong (HKG)	1	3	7	11
4	Iraq (IRQ)	0	3	3	6
5	Japan (JPN)	0	2	7	9
6	South Korea (KOR)	0	0	5	5
7	Indonesia (INA)*	0	0	1	1
7	Malaysia (MAS)	0	0	1	1
Totals (8 entries)		18	18	30	66

== Medalists ==
=== Men ===
Event	Class	Gold	Silver	Bronze
Individual épée	A	Sun Gang; China	Tian Jianquan; China	Zainulabdeen Al-Madhkhoori; Iraq
Individual épée	A	Sun Gang; China	Tian Jianquan; China	Sim Jae-hoon; South Korea
Individual épée	B	Hu Daoliang; China	Ammar Ali; Iraq	Ali Mnahi; Iraq
Individual épée	B	Hu Daoliang; China	Ammar Ali; Iraq	Michinobu Fujita; Japan
Team épée	A–B	China; Hu Daoliang; Tian Jianquan; Sun Gang; Feng Yanke	Iraq; Ammar Ali; Zainulabdeen Al-Madhkhoori; Hayder Al-Ogaili; Ali Mnahi	South Korea; Sim Jae-hoon; Kim Sung-hwan; Park Chun-hee; Cho Yeong-rae
Individual foil	A	Sun Gang; China	Cheong Meng Chai; Hong Kong	Chen Yijun; China
Individual foil	A	Sun Gang; China	Cheong Meng Chai; Hong Kong	Sim Jae-hoon; South Korea
Individual foil	B	Hu Daoliang; China	Michinobu Fujita; Japan	Ammar Ali; Iraq
Individual foil	B	Hu Daoliang; China	Michinobu Fujita; Japan	Feng Yanke; China
Team foil	A–B	China; Hu Daoliang; Chen Yijun; Sun Gang; Feng Yanke	Iraq; Ammar Ali; Zainulabdeen Al-Madhkhoori; Hayder Al-Ogaili; Ali Mnahi	Japan; Michinobu Fujita; Shintaro Kano; Takaaki Sasajima; Naoki Yasu
Individual sabre	A	Chen Yijun; China	Tian Jianquan; China	Chan Wing Kin; Hong Kong
Individual sabre	A	Chen Yijun; China	Tian Jianquan; China	Cheong Meng Chai; Hong Kong
Individual sabre	B	Feng Yanke; China	Ryuji Onda; Japan	Park Chun-hee; South Korea
Individual sabre	B	Feng Yanke; China	Ryuji Onda; Japan	Muhammad Adam Salleh; Malaysia
Team sabre	A–B	China; Chen Yijun; Feng Yanke; Sun Gang; Tian Jianquan	Thailand; Boonsiri Sanitmuanwai; Pachara Jirasinwanich; Pipat Thongjapo; Chaichan Jongjairak	Japan; Ryuji Onda; Naoki Yasu; Shintaro Kano; Takaaki Sasajima

=== Women ===
Event	Class	Gold	Silver	Bronze
Individual épée	A	Zou Xufeng; China	Wang Xiujian; China	Kim Sun-mi; South Korea
Individual épée	A	Zou Xufeng; China	Wang Xiujian; China	Yu Chui Yee; Hong Kong
Individual épée	B	Saysunee Jana; Thailand	Zhou Jingjing; China	Anri Sakurai; Japan
Individual épée	B	Saysunee Jana; Thailand	Zhou Jingjing; China	Tong Nga Ting; Hong Kong
Team épée	A–B	China; Zhou Jingjing; Zou Xufeng; Wang Xiujian; Gu Haiyan	Hong Kong; Justine Charissa Ng; Tong Nga Ting; Yu Chui Yee; Fan Pui Shan	Thailand; Cholthacha Bussayawiphathorn; Duean Nakprasit; Saysunee Jana; Suthin Sita
Individual foil	A	Yu Chui Yee; Hong Kong	Gu Haiyan; China	Justine Charissa Ng; Hong Kong
Individual foil	A	Yu Chui Yee; Hong Kong	Gu Haiyan; China	Zou Xufeng; China
Individual foil	B	Zhou Jingjing; China	Saysunee Jana; Thailand	Anri Sakurai; Japan
Individual foil	B	Zhou Jingjing; China	Saysunee Jana; Thailand	Chung Yuen Ping; Hong Kong
Team foil	A–B	China; Zhou Jingjing; Zou Xufeng; Gu Haiyan; Xiao Rong	Hong Kong; Fan Pui Shan; Chung Yuen Ping; Yu Chui Yee; Justine Charissa Ng	Thailand; Saysunee Jana; Atittaya Chookerd; Suthin Sita
Individual sabre	A	Gu Haiyan; China	Atittaya Chookerd; Thailand	Yu Chui Yee; Hong Kong
Individual sabre	A	Gu Haiyan; China	Atittaya Chookerd; Thailand	Duean Nakprasit; Thailand
Individual sabre	B	Xiao Rong; China	Saysunee Jana; Thailand	Chisato Abe; Japan
Individual sabre	B	Xiao Rong; China	Saysunee Jana; Thailand	Anri Sakurai; Japan
Team sabre	A–B	China; Xiao Rong; Zou Xufeng; Wang Xiujian; Gu Haiyan	Thailand; Saysunee Jana; Atittaya Chookerd; Duean Nakprasit; Cholthacha Bussayawiphathorn	Indonesia; Suwarsih; Sri Lestari; Elih; Survaya Dewi Ningrum

== Medals (2010-2018) ==
Rank	Nation	Gold	Silver	Bronze	Total
1	China (CHN)	34	15	14	63
2	Hong Kong (HKG)	8	14	19	41
3	Thailand (THA)	2	6	6	14
4	Iraq (IRQ)	1	4	8	13
5	South Korea (KOR)	0	3	16	19
6	Japan (JPN)	0	2	7	9
7	Malaysia (MAS)	0	1	2	3
8	Kuwait (KUW)	0	0	2	2
9	India (IND)	0	0	1	1
9	Indonesia (INA)	0	0	1	1
9	United Arab Emirates (UAE)	0	0	1	1
Totals (11 entries)		45	45	77	167

== See also ==
- Fencing at the 2018 Asian Games
