= Zainulabdeen Al-Madhkhoori =

Iraqi wheelchair fencer (born 1991)

Personal information
- Born: 4 July 1991 (age 34) Baghdad, Iraq

Sport
- Sport: Wheelchair fencing
- Disability class: A
Medal record
Men's wheelchair fencing
Representing Iraq
Paralympic Games
Silver medal – second place	2024 Paris	Team épée
Asian Para Games
Silver medal – second place	2018 Jakarta	Team épée
Silver medal – second place	2018 Jakarta	Team foil
Bronze medal – third place	2014 Incheon	Épée A
Bronze medal – third place	2014 Incheon	Team épée
Bronze medal – third place	2014 Incheon	Team foil
Bronze medal – third place	2018 Jakarta	Épée A

Zainulabdeen Al-Madhkhoori (born 4 July 1991) is an Iraqi wheelchair fencer.

== Career ==
Al-Madhkhoori represented Iraq at the 2024 Summer Paralympics and won a silver medal in the épée team event.
