= Visit Kingmanaw =

Thai wheelchair fencer (born 1989)

Personal information
- Nationality: Thai
- Born: 3 February 1989 (age 37)
- Home town: Nonthaburi, Thailand

Sport
- Country: Thailand
- Sport: Wheelchair fencing
Medal record
Men's wheelchair fencing
Representing Thailand
Paralympic Games
Silver medal – second place	2024 Paris	Épée B

Visit Kingmanaw (born 3 February 1989) is a Thai wheelchair fencer. He represented Thailand at the 2024 Summer Paralympics.

== Career ==
Kingmanaw represented Thailand at the 2024 Summer Paralympics and won a silver medal in the épée B event.
