= Duean Nakprasit =

Thai wheelchair fencer (born 1992)

Personal information
- Born: 27 January 1992 (age 34) Nonthaburi, Thailand

Sport
- Sport: Wheelchair fencing
- Disability class: A
Medal record
Women's wheelchair fencing
Representing Thailand
Paralympic Games
Bronze medal – third place	2024 Paris	Team épée
Asian Para Games
Silver medal – second place	2018 Jakarta	Team sabre
Bronze medal – third place	2018 Jakarta	Team épée

Duean Nakprasit (born 27 January 1992) is a Thai wheelchair fencer. She represented Thailand at the 2024 Summer Paralympics.

== Career ==
Nakprasit represented Thailand at the 2024 Summer Paralympics and won a bronze medal in the épée team event.
