= Xiao Rong =

Chinese wheelchair fencer

Personal information
- Born: 24 August 1993 (age 32)

Sport
- Country: China
- Sport: Wheelchair fencing
Medal record
Paralympic Games
Gold medal – first place	2024 Paris	Team foil
Silver medal – second place	2024 Paris	Foil B
Silver medal – second place	2024 Paris	Sabre B
Bronze medal – third place	2020 Tokyo	Sabre B
Asian Para Games
Gold medal – first place	2018 Jakarta	Team foil
Gold medal – first place	2018 Jakarta	Team sabre
Gold medal – first place	2018 Jakarta	Sabre B
Gold medal – first place	2022 Hangzhou	Foil B
Gold medal – first place	2022 Hangzhou	Sabre B
Gold medal – first place	2022 Hangzhou	Team foil
Gold medal – first place	2022 Hangzhou	Team sabre

Xiao Rong (born 24 August 1993) is a Chinese wheelchair fencer. She won the bronze medal in the women's sabre B event at the 2020 Summer Paralympics held in Tokyo, Japan and a silver medal for the same event at the 2024 Summer Paralympics in Paris, France.
