= Zhang Jie (wheelchair fencer) =

Chinese wheelchair fencer

Personal information
- Born: 17 December 1994 (age 31)

Fencing career
- Sport: Fencing
- Weapon: Épée B / Sabre B
- Disability class: B
Medal record
Wheelchair fencing
Representing China
Summer Paralympics
Gold medal – first place	2024 Paris	Épée team
Bronze medal – third place	2024 Paris	Sabre B
Asian Para Games
Silver medal – second place	2022 Hangzhou	Épée B
Silver medal – second place	2022 Hangzhou	Sabre B

Zhang Jie (born 17 December 1994) is a Chinese wheelchair fencer who competes in both épée and sabre B. He competed at the 2024 Paralympic Games where he won a gold medal in the épée team event and a bronze medal in the 2024 Paralympics in the Individual Sabre B classification.
