= Kwon Hyo-kyeong =

South Korean wheelchair fencer

Personal information
- Nationality: South Korean
- Born: 17 April 2001 (age 25) Hwaseong, Gyeonggi, South Korea

Sport
- Sport: Wheelchair fencing
Medal record
Women's wheelchair fencing
Representing South Korea
Paralympic Games
Silver medal – second place	2024 Paris	Épée A
Asian Para Games
Bronze medal – third place	2022 Hangzhou	Épée team

Kwon Hyo-kyeong (born 17 April 2001) is a South Korean wheelchair fencer. She represented South Korea at the 2024 Summer Paralympics.

== Career ==
Kwon represented South Korea at the 2024 Summer Paralympics and won a silver medal in the épée A event.
