= Chen Yuandong =

Chinese wheelchair fencer (born 1994)

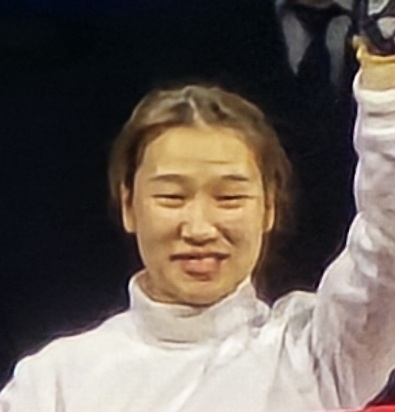

Personal information
- Born: 27 November 1994 (age 31) Luzhou, Sichuan, China

Fencing career
- Sport: Fencing
- Weapon: Épée A / Foil A / Sabre A
- Disability class: A
Medal record
Wheelchair fencing
Representing China
Paralympic Games
Gold medal – first place	2024 Paris	Épée A
Gold medal – first place	2024 Paris	Foil team
World Championships
Gold medal – first place	2023 Terni	Epée team
Gold medal – first place	2023 Terni	Foil team
Gold medal – first place	2023 Terni	Women's sabre team
Bronze medal – third place	2023 Terni	Épée A
Bronze medal – third place	2023 Terni	Foil A
Asian Para Games
Gold medal – first place	2022 Hangzhou	Epée team
Gold medal – first place	2022 Hangzhou	Foil team
Gold medal – first place	2022 Hangzhou	Women's sabre team
Gold medal – first place	2022 Hangzhou	Epée A
Silver medal – second place	2022 Hangzhou	Foil A
Silver medal – second place	2022 Hangzhou	Sabre A

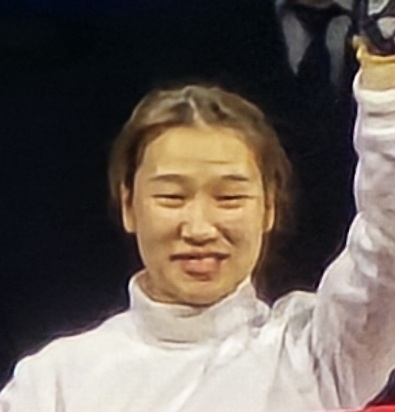

Chen Yuandong (born 27 November 1994) is a Chinese wheelchair fencer who competes in épée, foil and sabre A. She has won multiple medals at the Asian Para Games and the World Championships, as well as the Summer Paralympics.

== Early life ==
Chen was born in Luzhou, Sichuan, China on 27 November 1994. She had trained in athletics before she was persuaded to take up wheelchair fencing by her friend Hu Yang in 2015.

== Career ==
Chen competed in the 2023 World Championships in October 2023, winning the gold medal in the épée, foil, and women's sabre team events. She had also won the bronze medal in the épée and foil A events. Later in the same month, at the 2022 Asian Para Games, Chen won six medals in four of which were gold which came at the épée, foil, and women's sabre team events as well as épée A.

In January 2024, Chen competed in the Wheelchair Fencing World Cup, where she won the gold medal in the épée A and the women's épée team event. She made her debut at Paralympic debut at the 2024 Summer Paralympics, where she won a gold medal in the women's foil team event.
