= Zhong Saichun =

Chinese wheelchair fencer (born 1993)

Personal information
- Born: 4 November 1993 (age 32) Suqian, Jiangsu, China

Fencing career
- Sport: Fencing
- Weapon: Épée A / Foil A / Sabre A
- Disability class: A
Medal record
Wheelchair fencing
Representing China
Paralympic Games
Gold medal – first place	2024 Paris	Team épée
Gold medal – first place	2024 Paris	Team foil
Bronze medal – third place	2024 Paris	Foil A
Asian Para Games
Gold medal – first place	2022 Hangzhou	Foil team
Gold medal – first place	2022 Hangzhou	Foil A
Bronze medal – third place	2022 Hangzhou	Épée A
Bronze medal – third place	2022 Hangzhou	Sabre A

Zhong Saichun (born 4 November 1993) is a Chinese wheelchair fencer who competes in épée, foil and sabre A. He is the bronze medalist in the 2024 Paralympics in the Individual Foil A classification.
