= Bian Jing =

Chinese wheelchair fencer

Sport
- Country: China
- Sport: Wheelchair fencing
Medal record
Paralympic Games
Gold medal – first place	2020 Tokyo	Sabre A
Gold medal – first place	2020 Tokyo	Team Épée
Silver medal – second place	2016 Rio de Janeiro	Épée A
Bronze medal – third place	2020 Tokyo	Épée A
World Championships
Gold medal – first place	2013 Budapest	Sabre A
Gold medal – first place	2019 Cheongju	Épée A
Gold medal – first place	2019 Cheongju	Sabre A
Gold medal – first place	2019 Cheongju	Team Épée
Silver medal – second place	2013 Budapest	Foil A
Silver medal – second place	2013 Budapest	Team Foil
Silver medal – second place	2015 Eger	Sabre A
Silver medal – second place	2019 Cheongju	Épée A

Bian Jing is a Chinese wheelchair fencer. She won the gold medal in the women's sabre A event at the 2020 Summer Paralympics held in Tokyo, Japan. She also won the gold medal in the women's team épèe.
