= Li Hao (fencer) =

Chinese wheelchair fencer

Personal information
- Born: 29 August 1994 (age 31)

Sport
- Country: China
- Sport: Wheelchair fencing
Medal record
Paralympic Games
Gold medal – first place	2020 Tokyo	Sabre A
Gold medal – first place	2020 Tokyo	Team Foil
World Championships
Silver medal – second place	2019 Cheongju	Sabre A
Silver medal – second place	2019 Cheongju	Team Sabre
Asian Para Games
Bronze medal – third place	2022 Hangzhou	Sabre A

Li Hao (born 29 August 1994) is a Chinese wheelchair fencer. He won two gold medals in the men's sabre A event and team foil event at the 2020 Summer Paralympics held in Tokyo, Japan. He also won two World Championship medals.
