= Zou Xufeng =

Chinese wheelchair fencer

Personal information
- Born: 1 November 1990 (age 35) Xuzhou, China

Sport
- Country: China
- Sport: Wheelchair fencing
Medal record
Paralympic Games
Gold medal – first place	2016 Rio de Janeiro	Épée A
Gold medal – first place	2016 Rio de Janeiro	Team épée
Gold medal – first place	2024 Paris	Foil A
Gold medal – first place	2024 Paris	Team épée
Gold medal – first place	2024 Paris	Team foil
Asian Para Games
Gold medal – first place	2018 Jakarta	Épée A
Gold medal – first place	2018 Jakarta	Épée team
Gold medal – first place	2018 Jakarta	Foil team
Gold medal – first place	2018 Jakarta	Sabre team
Gold medal – first place	2022 Hangzhou	Épée team
Gold medal – first place	2022 Hangzhou	Foil team
Gold medal – first place	2022 Hangzhou	Sabre team
Bronze medal – third place	2018 Jakarta	Foil A
Bronze medal – third place	2022 Hangzhou	Foil A
Bronze medal – third place	2022 Hangzhou	Sabre A
Bronze medal – third place	2022 Hangzhou	Épée A

Zou Xufeng (born 1 November 1990) is a Chinese wheelchair fencer. She represented China at the 2016 Summer Paralympics and she won two medals: the gold medal in the women's épée A event and the gold medal in the women's team épée event.
