= Gu Haiyan =

Chinese wheelchair fencer

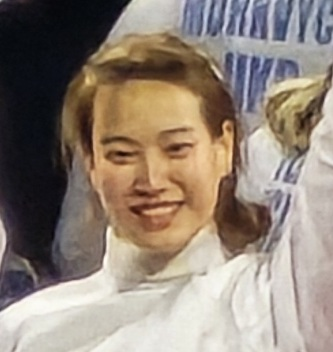

Personal information
- Born: 29 September 1999 (age 26) Sichuan, China

Sport
- Country: China
- Sport: Wheelchair fencing
Medal record
Paralympic Games
Gold medal – first place	2020 Tokyo	Foil A
Gold medal – first place	2020 Tokyo	Team foil
Gold medal – first place	2024 Paris	Sabre A
Gold medal – first place	2024 Paris	Team épée
Gold medal – first place	2024 Paris	Team foil
Silver medal – second place	2024 Paris	Foil A
Bronze medal – third place	2024 Paris	Épée A
World Championships
Gold medal – first place	2019 Cheongju	Team Sabre
Bronze medal – third place	2010 Paris	Sabre A
Asian Para Games
Gold medal – first place	2018 Jakarta	Sabre A
Gold medal – first place	2018 Jakarta	Team Épée
Gold medal – first place	2018 Jakarta	Team Foil
Gold medal – first place	2018 Jakarta	Team Sabre
Gold medal – first place	2022 Hangzhou	Sabre A
Gold medal – first place	2022 Hangzhou	Foil A
Gold medal – first place	2022 Hangzhou	Team Épée
Gold medal – first place	2022 Hangzhou	Team Foil
Gold medal – first place	2022 Hangzhou	Team Sabre
Silver medal – second place	2018 Jakarta	Foil A
Silver medal – second place	2022 Hangzhou	Épée A

Gu Haiyan (born 29 September 1999) is a Chinese wheelchair fencer.

She has competed at the Summer Paralympics in 2020, where she won gold medals in the individual foil A and team foil events, and in 2024, where she won a gold medal in the sabre A event.

At the 2019 IWAS Wheelchair Fencing World Championships held in Cheongju, South Korea, she won the gold medal in the women's team sabre event.
