= Ammar Ali =

Iraqi wheelchair fencer

Personal information
- Born: 28 April 1985 (age 41) Baghdad, Iraq

Sport
- Country: Iraq
- Sport: Wheelchair fencing
Medal record
Paralympic Games
Silver medal – second place	2016 Rio de Janeiro	Épée B
Silver medal – second place	2024 Paris	Team épée
Asian Para Games
Gold medal – first place	2010 Guangzhou	Épée B
Silver medal – second place	2018 Jakarta	Épée B
Silver medal – second place	2018 Jakarta	Team epée
Silver medal – second place	2018 Jakarta	Team foil
Silver medal – second place	2022 Hangzhou	Team epée
Silver medal – second place	2022 Hangzhou	Team foil
Bronze medal – third place	2018 Jakarta	Foil B

Ammar Ali (born 28 April 1985) is an Iraqi wheelchair fencer. He represented Iraq at the Summer Paralympics in 2012, 2016, 2020 and 2024. He won the silver medal in the men's épée B event in 2016 and a silver medal at the 2024 games in the épée team event.
