= Zhou Jingjing =

Chinese wheelchair fencer

Personal information
- Born: 27 March 1987 (age 39) Shanghai, China

Sport
- Country: China
- Sport: Wheelchair fencing
Medal record
Paralympic Games
Gold medal – first place	2016 Rio de Janeiro	Épée B
Gold medal – first place	2016 Rio de Janeiro	Team épée
Gold medal – first place	2016 Rio de Janeiro	Team foil
Gold medal – first place	2020 Tokyo	Team foil
Silver medal – second place	2016 Rio de Janeiro	Foil B
Silver medal – second place	2020 Tokyo	Foil B
World Championships
Gold medal – first place	2011 Catania	Foil B
Gold medal – first place	2013 Budapest	Team épée
Bronze medal – third place	2011 Catania	Team foil
Bronze medal – third place	2013 Budapest	Foil B
Bronze medal – third place	2015 Eger	Foil B
Bronze medal – third place	2015 Eger	Épée B
Bronze medal – third place	2019 Cheongju	Épée B
Asian Para Games
Gold medal – first place	2014 Incheon	Épée B
Gold medal – first place	2018 Jakarta	Team épée
Gold medal – first place	2018 Jakarta	Foil B
Gold medal – first place	2018 Jakarta	Team foil
Silver medal – second place	2018 Jakarta	Épée B
Bronze medal – third place	2023 Hangzhou	Foil B

Zhou Jingjing (born 27 March 1987) is a Chinese wheelchair fencer. She represented China at the Summer Paralympics in 2012, 2016 and 2020 and in total she won four gold medals and two silver medals.
