= Hu Daoliang =

Chinese wheelchair fencer

Personal information
- Citizenship: China
- Born: August 4, 1980 (age 45) Suqian, Jiangsu

Sport
- Country: China
- Sport: Wheelchair fencing
Medal record
Paralympic Games
Gold medal – first place	2004 Athens	Team Foil
Gold medal – first place	2008 Beijing	Épée B
Gold medal – first place	2008 Beijing	Foil B
Gold medal – first place	2012 London	Foil B
Gold medal – first place	2012 London	Foil team
Gold medal – first place	2016 Rio de Janeiro	Team Foil
Gold medal – first place	2020 Tokyo	Team Foil
Silver medal – second place	2016 Rio de Janeiro	Foil B
Silver medal – second place	2016 Rio de Janeiro	Team Épée
Silver medal – second place	2020 Tokyo	Team Épée
Silver medal – second place	2020 Tokyo	Foil B
Bronze medal – third place	2004 Athens	Team Épée
Bronze medal – third place	2024 Paris	Foil B
World Championships
Gold medal – first place	2010 Paris	Épée B
Gold medal – first place	2010 Paris	Foil B
Gold medal – first place	2010 Paris	Team Épée
Gold medal – first place	2011 Catania	Team Épée
Gold medal – first place	2011 Catania	Team Foil
Gold medal – first place	2013 Budapest	Foil B
Gold medal – first place	2013 Budapest	Team Foil
Gold medal – first place	2013 Budapest	Team Épée
Gold medal – first place	2015 Eger	Foil B
Silver medal – second place	2011 Catania	Épée B
Silver medal – second place	2015 Eger	Épée Bl
Silver medal – second place	2019 Cheongju	Épée B
Bronze medal – third place	2010 Catania	Team Épée
Bronze medal – third place	2011 Catania	Foil B
Bronze medal – third place	2019 Cheongju	Foil B
Asian Para Games
Gold medal – first place	2010 Guangzhou	Foil B
Gold medal – first place	2010 Guangzhou	Team foil
Gold medal – first place	2018 Jakarta	Épée B
Gold medal – first place	2018 Jakarta	Épée team
Gold medal – first place	2018 Jakarta	Foil B
Gold medal – first place	2018 Jakarta	Foil team
Gold medal – first place	2022 Hangzhou	Foil B

Hu Daoliang (born 4 April 1980) is a Chinese wheelchair fencer. He represented China at the Summer Paralympics in 2004, 2008, 2012 2016, 2021 and 2024. In total, he won seven gold medals, four silver medals and two bronze medals. He has won fifteen medals, including nine gold, at the World Championships.
