= Tian Jianquan =

Chinese wheelchair fencer

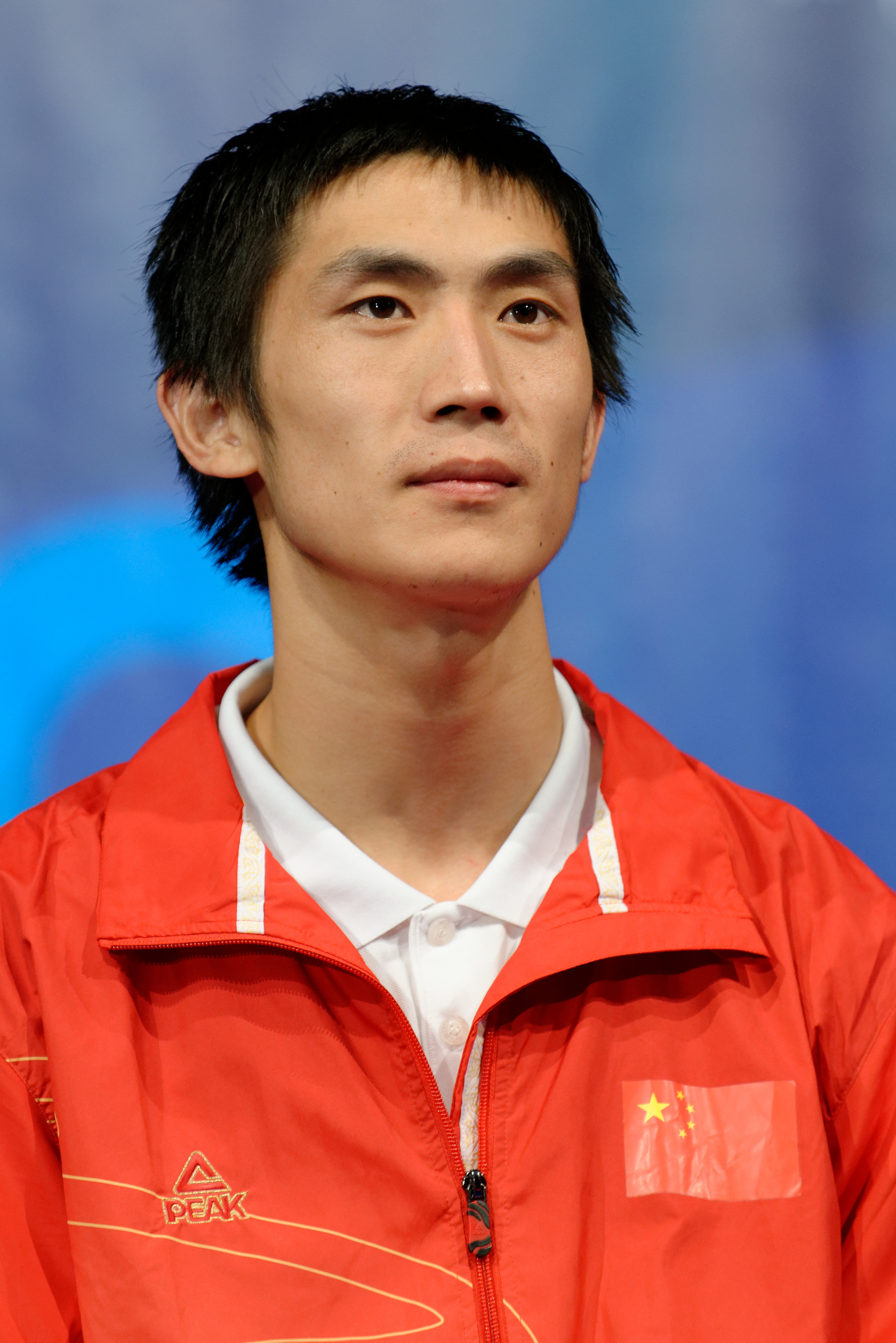
- Tian in 2013

Personal information
- Born: 25 October 1989 (age 36) Jiangsu Province, China

Sport
- Country: China
- Sport: Wheelchair fencing
Medal record
Men's wheelchair fencing
Representing China
Paralympic Games
Gold medal – first place	2008 Beijing	Épée A
Gold medal – first place	2024 Paris	Team épée
Gold medal – first place	2024 Paris	Team foil
Silver medal – second place	2008 Beijing	Sabre A
Silver medal – second place	2012 London	Sabre A
Silver medal – second place	2016 Rio de Janeiro	Team épée
Silver medal – second place	2020 Tokyo	Team épée
Bronze medal – third place	2016 Rio de Janeiro	Épée A
Bronze medal – third place	2016 Rio de Janeiro	Sabre A
Bronze medal – third place	2020 Tokyo	Épée A
Bronze medal – third place	2020 Tokyo	Sabre A
Asian Para Games
Gold medal – first place	2010 Guangzhou	Épée A
Gold medal – first place	2010 Guangzhou	Sabre A
Silver medal – second place	2014 Incheon	Sabre A
Gold medal – first place	2018 Jakarta	Team épée
Gold medal – first place	2018 Jakarta	Team sabre
Gold medal – first place	2022 Hangzhou	Épée team
Gold medal – first place	2022 Hangzhou	Sabre A
Silver medal – second place	2018 Jakarta	Épée A
Silver medal – second place	2018 Jakarta	Sabre A
Bronze medal – third place	2022 Hangzhou	Foil A
Bronze medal – third place	2022 Hangzhou	Épée A

Tian Jianquan (born 25 October 1989) is a Chinese wheelchair fencer. He represented China at the Summer Paralympics in 2008, 2012, 2016, 2020 and 2024 and, in total, he won three gold medals, four silver medals and four bronze medals.
