= Sun Gang =

Chinese wheelchair fencer

Personal information
- Born: May 4, 1993 (age 33) Jiangsu, China

Sport
- Country: China
- Sport: Wheelchair fencing
Medal record
Paralympic Games
Gold medal – first place	2016 Rio de Janeiro	Épée A
Gold medal – first place	2016 Rio de Janeiro	Team foil
Gold medal – first place	2020 Tokyo	Foil A
Gold medal – first place	2020 Tokyo	Team foil
Gold medal – first place	2024 Paris	Épée A
Gold medal – first place	2024 Paris	Foil A
Gold medal – first place	2024 Paris	Team épée
Gold medal – first place	2024 Paris	Team foil
Silver medal – second place	2016 Rio de Janeiro	Team épée
Silver medal – second place	2020 Tokyo	Team épée
Bronze medal – third place	2016 Rio de Janeiro	Foil A
World Championships
Gold medal – first place	2013 Budapest	Team foil
Gold medal – first place	2013 Budapest	Team épée
Gold medal – first place	2015 Eger	Épée A
Gold medal – first place	2019 Cheongju	Team foil
Silver medal – second place	2015 Eger	Foil A
Bronze medal – third place	2013 Budapest	Épée A
Bronze medal – third place	2019 Cheongju	Foil A
Asian Para Games
Gold medal – first place	2014 Incheon	Foil A
Gold medal – first place	2014 Incheon	Team épée
Gold medal – first place	2014 Incheon	Team foil
Gold medal – first place	2018 Jakarta	Épée A
Gold medal – first place	2018 Jakarta	Team épée
Gold medal – first place	2018 Jakarta	Foil A
Gold medal – first place	2018 Jakarta	Team foil
Gold medal – first place	2018 Jakarta	Team sabre
Gold medal – first place	2022 Hangzhou	Épée A
Gold medal – first place	2022 Hangzhou	Team épée
Gold medal – first place	2022 Hangzhou	Team foil
Silver medal – second place	2014 Incheon	Épée A
Silver medal – second place	2022 Hangzhou	Foil A

Sun Gang (born 4 May 1993) is a Chinese wheelchair fencer. He represented China at the 2016 Summer Paralympics and in total he won two gold medals, one silver medal and one bronze medal. He also won two gold medals in the men's foil A event, men's team foil and the silver medal in the men's épée team at the 2020 Summer Paralympics held in Tokyo, Japan.
