= Feng Yanke =

Chinese wheelchair fencer

Personal information
- Born: 10 January 1988 (age 38) Xuzhou, China

Sport
- Country: China
- Sport: Wheelchair fencing
Medal record
Paralympic Games
Gold medal – first place	2016 Rio de Janeiro	Foil B
Gold medal – first place	2020 Tokyo	Sabre B
Gold medal – first place	2020 Tokyo	Foil B
Gold medal – first place	2024 Paris	Sabre B
Gold medal – first place	2024 Paris	Team foil
Silver medal – second place	2024 Paris	Foil B
World Championships
Gold medal – first place	2019 Cheongju	Foil B
Gold medal – first place	2019 Cheongju	Team Foil
Silver medal – second place	2019 Cheongju	Sabre B
Silver medal – second place	2019 Cheongju	Team Sabre
Bronze medal – third place	2015 Eger	Sabre B
Asian Para Games
Gold medal – first place	2018 Jakarta	Épée team
Gold medal – first place	2018 Jakarta	Foil team
Gold medal – first place	2018 Jakarta	Sabre team
Gold medal – first place	2018 Jakarta	Sabre B
Gold medal – first place	2022 Hangzhou	Foil team
Gold medal – first place	2022 Hangzhou	Sabre B
Silver medal – second place	2022 Hangzhou	Foil B
Bronze medal – third place	2018 Jakarta	Foil B
Bronze medal – third place	2022 Hangzhou	Épée B

Feng Yanke (born 10 January 1988) is a Chinese wheelchair fencer. He represented China at the 2016 Summer Paralympics held in Rio de Janeiro, Brazil and he won the gold medal in the Men's Foil B event. At the 2020 Summer Paralympics held in Tokyo, Japan, he won two gold medals in the Men's Sabre B and Men's Foil B event.
