= Wheelchair fencing classification =

Disability sport classification system

Wheelchair fencing classification is the classification system for wheelchair fencing which is governed by the IWAS. People with physical disabilities are eligible to compete included people with physical disabilities. Classification for national competitions is done through the local national Paralympic committee.

== Purpose ==
In wheelchair fencing, the purpose of classification is to insure that fencers are classified based on equitable functional mobility.This is done so that their training, skill level, talent and experience determine the outcome of a match, not their disability type. This insures fairness in the sport.

== Governance ==
In 2009, the classification was handled by the International Wheelchair and Amputee Sports Federation (IWAS). In 1983, the rules for this sport and approval for classification was done by the Federation Internationale Escrime. IWAS continues to serve as the international classification body for the sport, with classification handled by a wheelchair fencing subcommittee.

== Classes and eligibility ==
There are four classes in wheelchair fencing, with the classes having names of 1, 2, 3 and 4. These classes are often combined with the combined classes of Category A and Category B.

Class 3 is for paraplegics from D10 to L2, scoring between 5 and 9 points on Type 1 and Type 2 function tests. For class 4, fencers tend to have a lesion below L4. They tend to score at least 5 points on Type 3 and Type 4 of the function test. For international IWF sanctioned competitions, classes are combined. 3 and 4 are combined, competing as Category A.

Lower leg amputation competitors are allowed to participate in wheelchair sport following classification rules for them based on functional mobility. As of 2012, people with physical disability are eligible to compete in this sport.

== History ==
During the 1980s, there was a move away from a medical classification system to a functional one, with ISMWSF being one of the organizations driving this change on the wheelchair sport side. Some wheelchair sports saw the introduction of sport specific classification systems during this period, including wheelchair fencing, with the IWF Classification system being implemented for the 1988 Summer Paralympics in Seoul. It had first been used at the European Championships in Glasgow 1987, and was small changes were made to this system before its use at the 1988 Games.

By the early 1990s, wheelchair fencing classification had moved away from medical based system to a functional classification system. Because of issues in objectively identifying functionality that plagued the post Barcelona Games, the IPC unveiled plans to develop a new classification system in 2003. This classification system went into effect in 2007, and defined ten different disability types that were eligible to participate on the Paralympic level. It required that classification be sport specific, and served two roles. The first was that it determined eligibility to participate in the sport and that it created specific groups of sportspeople who were eligible to participate and in which class. The IPC left it up to International Federations to develop their own classification systems within this framework, with the specification that their classification systems use an evidence based approach developed through research.

Going forward, disability sport's major classification body, the International Paralympic Committee, is working on improving classification to be more of an evidence-based system as opposed to a performance-based system so as not to punish elite athletes whose performance makes them appear in a higher class alongside competitors who train less.

== At the Paralympic Games ==
Only wheelchair classified athletes were eligible to compete at the 1960 Summer Paralympics in Rome in this sport. This continued at the 1964 Summer Paralympics in Tokyo and 1968 Summer Paralympics in Tel Aviv. At the 1992 Summer Paralympics, wheelchair users were eligible to participate, with classification being run through ISMWSF, with classification being done based on functional spinal disability type. Wheelchair fencing at the 1996 Summer Paralympics saw the introduction of A and B classes, much like the ones used today. At the 2000 Summer Paralympics, 6 assessments were conducted at the Games. This resulted in 0 class changes. 1 classification was PPS protested by a national Paralympic committee and was denied.

For the 2016 Summer Paralympics in Rio, the International Paralympic Committee had a zero classification at the Games policy. This policy was put into place in 2014, with the goal of avoiding last minute changes in classes that would negatively impact athlete training preparations. All competitors needed to be internationally classified with their classification status confirmed prior to the Games, with exceptions to this policy being dealt with on a case-by-case basis.

== Getting classified ==
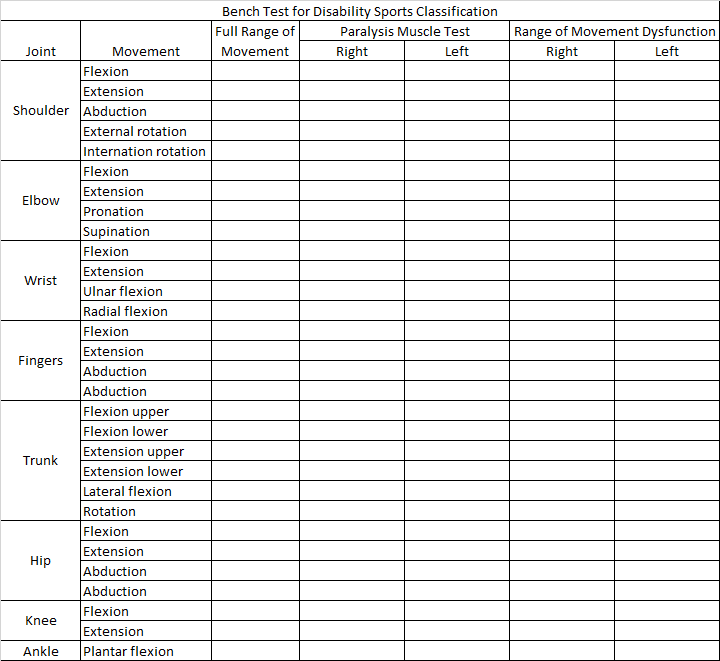
A standard bench press form used to for functional classification for wheelchair sportspeople.

In most countries, classification for national competitions is done through the local national Paralympic committee.

One of the standard means of assessing functional classification is the bench test. Using the Adapted Research Council (MRC) measurements, muscle strength is tested using the bench press for a variety of spinal cord related injuries with a muscle being assessed on a scale of 1 to 5 for people with cerebral. A 1 is for no functional movement of the muscle or where there is no motor coordination. A 2 is for normal muscle movement range not exceeding 25% or where the movement can only take place with great difficult and, even then, very slowly. A 3 is where normal muscle movement range does not exceed 50%. A 4 is when normal muscle movement range does not exceed 75% and or there is slight in-coordination of muscle movement. A 5 is for normal muscle movement.

Wheelchair fencing classification has 6 test for functionality during classification, along with a bench test. Each test gives 0 to 3 points. A 0 is for no function. A 1 is for minimum movement. A 2 is for fair movement but weak execution. A 3 is for normal execution. The first test is an extension of the dorsal musculature. The second test is for lateral balance of the upper limbs. The third test measures trunk extension of the lumbar muscles. The fourth test measures lateral balance while holding a weapon. The fifth test measures the trunk movement in a position between that recorded in tests one and three, and tests two and four. The sixth test measures the trunk extension involving the lumbar and dorsal muscles while leaning forward at a 45-degree angle. In addition, a bench test is required to be performed.
