= France at the 2024 Summer Paralympics =

- Flag of France
- IPC code: FRA
- NPC: French Paralympic and Sports Committee

in Paris, France 28 August 2024 – 8 September 2024
- Competitors: 237 in 17 sports
- Flag bearers (opening): Alexis Hanquinquant; Nantenin Keita
- Flag bearers (closing): Tanguy de La Forest; Aurélie Aubert
- Medals Ranked 8th: Gold 19 Silver 28 Bronze 28 Total 75

Summer Paralympics appearances (overview)
- 1960; 1964; 1968; 1972; 1976; 1980; 1984; 1988; 1992; 1996; 2000; 2004; 2008; 2012; 2016; 2020; 2024

France is competing as the host nation of the 2024 Summer Paralympics in their capital Paris from 28 August to 8 September 2024. It is the first time that France will be hosting the Summer Paralympics, they have hosted the Winter Paralympics in Albertville in 1992.

== Medalists ==
Medal	Name	Sport	Event	Date
Gold	Ugo Didier	Swimming	Men's 400 metre freestyle S9	29 August
Gold	Alexandre Léauté	Cycling	Men's pursuit C2	30 August
Gold	Dorian Foulon	Cycling	Men's pursuit C5	31 August
Gold	Marie Patouillet	Cycling	Women's pursuit C5	1 September
Gold	Tanguy de La Forest	Shooting	R5 Mixed 10 metre air rifle prone SH2	1 September
Gold	Emeline Pierre	Swimming	Women's 100 metre freestyle S10	1 September
Gold	Lucas Mazur	Badminton	Men's singles SL4	2 September
Gold	Charles Noakes	Badminton	Men's singles SH6	2 September
Gold	Aurélie Aubert	Boccia	Women's individual BC1	2 September
Gold	Jules Ribstein	Paratriathlon	Men's PTS2	2 September
Gold	Alexis Hanquinquant	Paratriathlon	Men's PTS4	2 September
Gold	Mathieu Bosredon	Cycling	Men's road time trial H3	4 September
Gold	Alexandre Léauté	Cycling	Men's road time trial C2	4 September
Gold	Thomas Peyroton-Dartet	Cycling	Men's road time trial C3	4 September
Gold	Kévin Le Cunff	Cycling	Men's road time trial C4	4 September
Gold	Florian Jouanny	Cycling	Men's road race H1–2	5 September
Gold	Mathieu Bosredon	Cycling	Men's road race H3	5 September
Gold	France national blind football team: Alessandro Bartolomucci; Mickael Miguez; Gael Riviere; Hakim Arezki; Martin Baron; Khalifa Youmé; Frédéric Villeroux; Ahmed Tidiane Diakite; Fabrice Morgado; Benoit de Montlehu	Blind football	Men's tournament	7 September
Gold	Mathieu Bosredon; Florian Jouanny; Joseph Fritsch	Cycling	Mixed team relay H1–5	7 September
Silver	Marie Patouillet	Cycling	Women's time trial C4–5	29 August
Silver	Alex Portal	Swimming	Men's 100 metre butterfly S13	29 August
Silver	Tanguy de La Forest	Shooting	R4 Mixed 10 metre air rifle standing SH2	30 August
Silver	Hector Denayer	Swimming	Men's 100 metre breaststroke SB9	30 August
Silver	Djélika Diallo	Taekwondo	Women's 65 kg	30 August
Silver	Alex Portal	Swimming	Men's 400 metre freestyle S13	31 August
Silver	Timothée Adolphe; Guide: Jeffrey Lami	Athletics	Men's 400 metres T11	1 September
Silver	Gloria Agblemagnon	Athletics	Women's shot put F20	1 September
Silver	Heïdi Gaugain	Cycling	Women's pursuit C5	1 September
Silver	Thibaut Rigaudeau; Guide: Cyril Viennot	Paratriathlon	Men's PTVI	2 September
Silver	Ugo Didier	Swimming	Men's 100 metre backstroke S9	3 September
Silver	Alex Portal	Swimming	Men's 200 metre individual medley SM13	3 September
Silver	Elie de Carvalho; Pilot: Mickaël Guichard	Cycling	Men's road time trial B	4 September
Silver	Johan Quaile	Cycling	Men's road time trial H3	4 September
Silver	Loïc Vergnaud	Cycling	Men's road time trial H5	4 September
Silver	Gatien Le Rousseau	Cycling	Men's road time trial C4	4 September
Silver	Heïdi Gaugain	Cycling	Women's road time trial C5	4 September
Silver	Timothée Adolphe; Guide: Charles Renard	Athletics	Men's 100 metres T11	5 September
Silver	Johan Quaile	Cycling	Men's road race H3	5 September
Silver	Loïc Vergnaud	Cycling	Men's road race H5	5 September
Silver	Sandrine Martinet	Judo	Women's 48 kg J2	5 September
Silver	Ugo Didier	Swimming	Men's 200 metre individual medley SM9	5 September
Silver	Kévin Le Cunff	Cycling	Men's road race C4–5	6 September
Silver	Heïdi Gaugain	Cycling	Women's road race C4–5	6 September
Silver	Thomas Peyroton-Dartet	Cycling	Men's road race C1–3	7 September
Silver	Hélios Latchoumanaya	Judo	Men's 90 kg J2	7 September
Silver	Lucas Didier	Table tennis	Men's singles MS9	7 September
Silver	Nélia Barbosa	Paracanoeing	Women's KL3	8 September
Bronze	Alex Portal	Swimming	Men's 100 metre backstroke S13	30 August
Bronze	Fabien Lamirault; Julien Michaud	Table tennis	Men's doubles MD4	30 August
Bronze	Antoine Praud	Athletics	Men's 1500 metres T46	31 August
Bronze	Alexandre Léauté	Cycling	Men's time trial C1–3	31 August
Bronze	Gatien Le Rousseau	Cycling	Men's pursuit C4	31 August
Bronze	Kylian Portal	Swimming	Men's 400 metre freestyle S13	31 August
Bronze	Clément Berthier; Esteban Herrault	Table tennis	Men's doubles MD14	31 August
Bronze	Florian Merrien; Flora Vautier	Table tennis	Mixed doubles XD7	31 August
Bronze	Manon Genest	Athletics	Women's long jump T37	1 September
Bronze	Nathalie Benoit	Rowing	PR1 women's single sculls	1 September
Bronze	Grégoire Bireau; Margot Boulet; Candyce Chafa; Rémy Taranto; Emilie Acquistapace	Rowing	PR3 mixed coxed four	1 September
Bronze	Lucas Mazur; Faustine Noël	Badminton	Mixed doubles SL3–SU5	2 September
Bronze	Antoine Perel; Guide: Yohan Le Berre	Paratriathlon	Men's PTVI	2 September
Bronze	Laurent Chardard	Swimming	Men's 50 metre butterfly S6	3 September
Bronze	Matéo Bohéas	Table tennis	Men's singles MS10	3 September
Bronze	Florian Jouanny	Cycling	Men's road time trial H2	4 September
Bronze	Dorian Foulon	Cycling	Men's road time trial C5	4 September
Bronze	Fabien Lamirault	Table tennis	Men's singles MS2	4 September
Bronze	Jean-Louis Michaud	Shooting	R6 Mixed 50 metre rifle prone SH1	5 September
Bronze	Laurent Chardard	Swimming	Men's 100 metre freestyle S6	5 September
Bronze	Hector Denayer	Swimming	Men's 200 metre individual medley SM9	5 September
Bronze	Ludovic Lemoine; Damien Tokatlian; Maxime Valet; Yohan Peter	Wheelchair fencing	Men's foil team	5 September
Bronze	Alexandre Lloveras; Pilot: Yoann Paillot	Cycling	Men's road race B	6 September
Bronze	Emeline Pierre	Swimming	Women's 100 metre backstroke S10	6 September
Bronze	Alexandre Léauté	Cycling	Men's road race C1–3	7 September
Bronze	Cyril Jonard	Judo	Men's 90 kg J1	7 September
Bronze	Jason Grandry	Judo	Men's +90 kg J1	7 September
Bronze	Rémy Boullé	Paracanoeing	Men's KL1	7 September

Medals by sport
Sport	1st place, gold medalist(s)	2nd place, silver medalist(s)	3rd place, bronze medalist(s)	Total
Cycling	10	12	6	28
Swimming	2	6	6	14
Paratriathlon	2	1	1	4
Badminton	2	0	1	3
Shooting	1	1	1	3
Blind football	1	0	0	1
Boccia	1	0	0	1
Athletics	0	3	2	5
Judo	0	2	2	4
Table tennis	0	1	5	6
Paracanoeing	0	1	1	2
Taekwondo	0	1	0	1
Rowing	0	0	2	2
Wheelchair fencing	0	0	1	1
Total	19	28	28	75

Medals by gender
Gender	1st place, gold medalist(s)	2nd place, silver medalist(s)	3rd place, bronze medalist(s)	Total
Male	14	19	21	54
Female	3	8	3	14
Mixed	2	1	4	7
Total	19	28	28	75

Medals by day
Day	1st place, gold medalist(s)	2nd place, silver medalist(s)	3rd place, bronze medalist(s)	Total
29 August	1	2	0	3
30 August	1	3	2	6
31 August	1	1	6	8
1 September	3	3	3	9
2 September	5	1	2	8
3 September	0	2	2	4
4 September	4	5	3	12
5 September	2	5	4	11
6 September	0	2	2	4
7 September	2	3	4	9
8 September	0	1	0	1
Total	19	28	28	75

== Competitors ==
Sport	Men	Women	Total
Archery	3	3	6
Athletics	8	3	11
Badminton	5	3	8
Blind football	9	—N/a	9
Boccia	3	2	5
Goalball	6	6	12
Judo	8	8	16
Paracanoeing	2	2	4
Rowing	6	5	11
Shooting	2	1	3
Sitting volleyball	12	12	24
Swimming	7	7	14
Table tennis	13	6	19
Taekwondo	1	2	3
Wheelchair basketball	12	0	12
Wheelchair fencing	3	3	6
Wheelchair rugby	TBD	TBD	12
Total	99	63	162

== Archery ==
As the host nation, France entered six athletes.

Men

Athlete	Event	Ranking Round		Round of 32	Round of 16	Quarterfinals	Semifinals	Finals	
Athlete	Event	Score	Seed	Opposition Score	Opposition Score	Opposition Score	Opposition Score	Opposition Score	Rank
Damien Letulle	Individual W1	566	13	—N/a	Gáspár (HUN); L 119–136	Did not advance			
Maxime Guérin	Individual compound open	686	17	Pavlik (SVK); W 143–138	Ai (CHN); L 139–144	Did not advance			
Thierry Joussaume	Individual compound open	679	24	Kadhim (IRQ); L 140–141	Did not advance				
Guillaume Toucoullet	Individual recurve open	652	1	Bye	Ramírez (COL); L 4–6	Did not advance			

Women

Athlete	Event	Ranking Round		Round of 32	Round of 16	Quarterfinals	Semifinals	Finals	
Athlete	Event	Score	Seed	Opposition Score	Opposition Score	Opposition Score	Opposition Score	Opposition Score	Rank
Julie Rigault-Chupin	Individual compound open	689	6	Yorulmaz (TUR); W 130–127	Lee (AUS); W 140–131	Hemmati (IRI); L 140–143	Did not advance		
Aziza Benhami	Individual recurve open	466	21	Rahimi (IRI); L 0–6	Did not advance				

Mixed

Athlete	Event	Ranking Round		Round of 16	Quarterfinals	Semifinals	Finals	
Athlete	Event	Score	Seed	Opposition Score	Opposition Score	Opposition Score	Opposition Score	Rank
Maxime Guérin; Julie Rigault-Chupin	Team compound	1375	7	Australia (AUS); L 134–142	Did not advance			
Guillaume Toucoullet; Aziza Benhami	Team recurve	1118	13	Poland (POL); L 0–6	Did not advance			

== Athletics ==
As the host nation, track and field athletes from France achieved quota places for the following events based on their results at the 2023 World Championships, 2024 World Championships, or through high performance allocation, as long as they meet the minimum entry standard (MES).

Key

- Note–Ranks given for track events are within the athlete's heat only
- Q = Qualified for the next round
- q = Qualified for the next round as a fastest loser or, in field events, by position without achieving the qualifying target
- DQ = Disqualified
- PR = Paralympic Record
- AR = Area (or continental) Record
- NR = National Record
- SB = Season's Best
- N/A = Round not applicable for the event
- Bye = Athlete not required to compete in round

Track & road events

Men

Athlete	Event	Heat		Semifinal		Final	
Athlete	Event	Result	Rank	Result	Rank	Result	Rank
Timothée Adolphe (guide: Charles Renard)	100 m T11	11.19	1 Q	11.11	1 Q	11.05	2nd place, silver medalist(s)
Gauthier Makunda (guide: Joachim Berland)	100 m T11	12.06	3	Did not advance			
Valentin Bertrand	100 m T37	12.46	5	Did not advance			
Dimitri Jozwicki	100 m T38	—N/a				11.13	5
Félicien Siapo	100 m T44	—N/a				11.66	4
Pierre Fairbank	100 m T53	15.32	2 Q	—N/a		15.28	5
Timothée Adolphe (guide: Jeffrey Lami)	400 m T11	51.39	1 Q	50.87	1 Q	50.75	2nd place, silver medalist(s)
Gauthier Makunda (guide: Lucas Mathonat)	400 m T11	53.20	2	Did not advance			
Charles-Antoine Kouakou	400 m T20	—N/a				49.04	8
Pierre Fairbank	400 m T53	49.10	4 q	—N/a		50.37	6
Pierre Fairbank	800 m T53	—N/a				1:40.69	4
Renaud Clerc	1500 m T38	—N/a				4:20.40	7
Antoine Praud	1500 m T46	—N/a				3:51.37	3rd place, bronze medalist(s)

Women

Athlete	Event	Heat		Semifinal		Final	
Athlete	Event	Result	Rank	Result	Rank	Result	Rank
Delya Boulaghlem (guide: Harold Achi-Yao)	100 m T11	DSQ		Did not advance			
Nantenin Keita	100 m T13	12.85	5	Did not advance			
Mandy François-Elie	100 m T37	13.52	3 Q	—N/a		13.67	5
Sofia Pace	100 m T38	13.60	8	Did not advance			
Marie N'Goussou	100 m T47	12.54	4 q	—N/a		12.58	6
Mandy François-Elie	200 m T37	—N/a				28.20	5
Angelina Lanza	200 m T47	27.05	3	Did not advance			
Marie N'Goussou	200 m T47	25.93	5	Did not advance			
Nantenin Keita	400 m T13	57.67	3 Q	—N/a		57.43	6
Laure Ustaritz	400 m T37	—N/a				1:09.20	6
Sofia Pace	400 m T38	1:02.37	5 q	—N/a		1:02.29	8
Rosario Murcia-Gangloff	Marathon T12	—N/a				3:13:50	4

Field events

Men

Athlete	Event	Final	
Athlete	Event	Distance	Position
Valentin Bertrand	Long jump T37	5.15	9
Arnaud Assoumani	Long jump T47	6.77	5
Dimitri Pavadé	Long jump T64	7.43	4
Alexandre Dipoko-Ewane	High jump T47	1.92	8
Soane Luka Meissonnier	Shot put F20	16.42	4
Vitolio Kavakava	Shot put F57	12.99	7
Badr Touzi	Shot put F63	13.33	7
Vitolio Kavakava	Javelin throw F57	43.16	7

Women

Athlete	Event	Final	
Athlete	Event	Distance	Position
Delya Boulaghlem	Long jump T11	4.48	5
Lola Desfeuillet	Long jump T38	4.04	11
Mandy François-Elie	Long jump T37	4.31	5
Manon Genest	Long jump T37	4.59	3rd place, bronze medalist(s)
Angelina Lanza	Long jump T47	5.20	7
Gloria Agblemagnon	Shot put F20	14.43	2nd place, silver medalist(s)
Alexandra Nouchet	Shot put F64	9.90	10

== Badminton ==
As the host nation, France has qualified seven para badminton players for the following events, through the release of BWF para-badminton Race to Paris Paralympic Ranking.

Men

Athlete	Event	Group Stage				Quarterfinal	Semifinal	Final / BM	
Athlete	Event	Opposition Score	Opposition Score	Opposition Score	Rank	Opposition Score	Opposition Score	Opposition Score	Rank
David Toupé	Singles WH1	Yang (CHN); L (14–21, 12–21)	Wandschneider (GER); L (12–21, 17–21)	—N/a	3	Did not advance			
Thomas Jakobs	Singles WH2	Kim (KOR); L (24–22, 8–21, 8–21)	Levi (ISR); W (21–12, 21–10)	—N/a	2	Did not advance			
Lucas Mazur	Singles SL4	Oliveira (BRA); W (21–9, 21–7)	Dhillon (IND); W (21–7, 21–16)	—N/a	1 Q	—N/a	Setiawan (INA); W (21–13, 21–8)	Yathiraj (IND); W (21–9, 21–13)	1st place, gold medalist(s)
Méril Loquette	Singles SU5	Nugroho (INA); L (13–21, 13–21)	Cheah (MAS); L (10–21, 16–21)	Mróz (POL); W (15–21, 21–19, 21–14)	3	Did not advance			
Charles Noakes	Singles SH6	Tavares (BRA); W (21–19, 21–16)	Lin (CHN); W (21–15, 21–17)	Shephard (GBR); W (21–17, 21–17)	1 Q	Bye	Tavares (BRA); W (21–18, 22–20)	Coombs (GBR); W (21–19, 21–13)	1st place, gold medalist(s)
Thomas Jakobs; David Toupé	Doubles WH1–2	Matsumoto / Nagashima (JPN); L (21–15, 18–21, 20–22)	Jeong / Yu (KOR); L (15–21, 15–21)	Choi / Kim (KOR); L (18–21, 21–13, 15–21)	3	Did not advance			

Women

Athlete	Event	Group Stage				Quarterfinal	Semifinal	Final / BM	
Athlete	Event	Opposition Score	Opposition Score	Opposition Score	Rank	Opposition Score	Opposition Score	Opposition Score	Rank
Faustine Noël	Singles SL4	Cheng (CHN); L (12–21, 11–21)	Sadiyah (INA); L (9–21, 12–21)	—N/a	3	Did not advance			
Milena Surreau	Singles SL4	Kohli (IND); L (12–21, 14–21)	Oktila (INA); L (9–21, 10–21)	—N/a	3	Did not advance			
Maud Lefort	Singles SU5	Ramadass (IND); L (21–8, 6–21, 17–21)	Yang (CHN); L (21–9, 4–21, 14–21)	—N/a	3	Did not advance			

Mixed

Athlete	Event	Group Stage				Semifinal	Final / BM	
Athlete	Event	Opposition Score	Opposition Score	Opposition Score	Rank	Opposition Score	Opposition Score	Rank
Lucas Mazur; Faustine Noël	Doubles SL3–SU5	Ramdani / Oktila (INA); L (11–21, 12–21)	Yathiraj / Kohli (IND); W (21–15, 21–9)	Nitesh / Murugesan (IND); W (24–22, 21–19)	2 Q	Setiawan / Sadiyah (INA); L (15–21, 15–21)	Bronze medal final Teamarrom / Seansupa (THA); W (21–14, 21–16)	3rd place, bronze medalist(s)

== Blind football ==
The French men's blind football team qualified for the games as hosts.

Summary

Team	Event	Group Stage				Semifinals	Final / BM	
Team	Event	Opposition Score	Opposition Score	Opposition Score	Rank	Opposition Score	Opposition Score	Rank
France men's	Men's tournament	China; W 1–0	Brazil; L 0–3	Turkey; W 2–0	2 Q	Colombia; W 1–0	Argentina; W 1–1 (3–2 p)	1st place, gold medalist(s)

Team roster

Coach: Toussaint Akpweh

The following is the France squad in the football 5-a-side tournament of the 2024 Summer Paralympics.

No.	Pos.	Player	Class	Date of birth (age)
1	GK	Alessandro Bartolomucci	Sighted	3 August 1997 (aged 27)
3	DF	Mickael Miguez	B1	11 January 1994 (aged 30)
4	FW	Gael Riviere	B1	22 December 1989 (aged 34)
5	DF	Hakim Arezki	B1	19 March 1983 (aged 41)
6	FW	Martin Baron	B1	24 July 1987 (aged 37)
9	FW	Khalifa Youmé	B1	11 November 1982 (aged 41)
10	MF	Frédéric Villeroux	B1	29 June 1983 (aged 41)
11	MF	Ahmed Tidiane Diakite	B1	30 December 1982 (aged 41)
13	FW	Fabrice Morgado	B1	7 March 1991 (aged 33)
16	GK	Benoit Chevreau de Montlehu	Sighted	27 January 1989 (aged 35)

Group stage

Pos	Team	Pld	W	D	L	GF	GA	GD	Pts	Qualification
1	Brazil	3	2	1	0	6	0	+6	7	Semi-finals
2	France (H)	3	2	0	1	3	3	0	6	Semi-finals
3	China	3	1	1	1	2	1	+1	4	Fifth place match
4	Turkey	3	0	0	3	0	7	−7	0	Seventh place match

Source: Paris 2024
(H) Hosts
1 September 2024
20:30

France	1–0	China
Youmé 19'	Report

Eiffel Tower Stadium, Paris
Attendance: 9,160
Referee: Germinal Dante Lubrano (Argentina)

2 September 2024
20:30

France	0–3	Brazil
	Report	Alves 14'; Soares 15' (pen.); Nonato 27'

Eiffel Tower Stadium, Paris
Attendance: 10,580
Referee: Tom Jozef de Bruyne (Belgium)

3 September 2024
20:30

Turkey	0–2	France
	Report	Villeroux 5'; Baron 20'

Eiffel Tower Stadium, Paris
Attendance: 10,580
Referee: Jose Alfredo Martinez Ibarra (Mexico)

Semi-finals

5 September 2024
17:30

Colombia	0–1	France
	Report	Villeroux 26'

Eiffel Tower Stadium, Paris
Attendance: 11,630
Referee: Tom Jozef de Bruyne (Belgium)

Gold medal match

7 September 2024
20:00

France	1–1	Argentina
Villeroux 12'	Report	Espinillo 12'
Penalties
Arezki (penalty scored); Baron (penalty scored); Villeroux (penalty scored)	3–2	(penalty scored) Espinillo; (penalty scored) Ríos; (penalty missed) Heredia

Eiffel Tower Stadium, Paris
Attendance: 11,679
Referee: Tom Jozef de Bruyne (Belgium)

== Boccia ==
As host nation, France directly qualifies three males, three females and one gender-free slots. Aurélie Aubert, Aurélien Fabre, Sonia Heckel, Fayçal Meguenni and Jules Menard have all qualified to compete.

Men

Athlete	Event	Pool matches				Playoffs	Quarterfinals	Semifinals	Final / BM	
Athlete	Event	Opposition Score	Opposition Score	Opposition Score	Rank	Opposition Score	Opposition Score	Opposition Score	Opposition Score	Rank
Aurélien Fabre	Individual BC2	Cristaldo (ARG); L 1–6	Araújo (POR); W 4–2	Silva (BRA); L 2–6	4	Did not advance				19
Fayçal Meguenni	Individual BC2	Vongsa (THA); L 5–5*	Mezik (SVK); L 0–8	Sayes (ESA); L 2–5	4	Did not advance				21
Jules Menard	Individual BC3	Polychronidis (GRE); L 2–5	Carvalho (BRA); W 5–4	Arita (JPN); W 4–2	2 Q	—N/a	Jeong H-w (KOR); L 1–4	Did not advance		7

Women

Athlete	Event	Pool matches				Quarterfinals	Semifinals	Final / BM	
Athlete	Event	Opposition Score	Opposition Score	Opposition Score	Rank	Opposition Score	Opposition Score	Opposition Score	Rank
Aurélie Aubert	Individual BC1	Tan (SGP); L 1–6	Arrieta (ESP); W 3*–3	—N/a	2 Q	Fujii (JPN); W 4–3	DeSilva-Andrade (BER); W 2*–2	Tan (SGP); W 5–4	1st place, gold medalist(s)
Sonia Heckel	Individual BC3	Cermakova (CZE); W 6–1	Owczarz (POL); L 2–9	Kla-Han (THA); L 1–4	3	Did not advance			9

Mixed

Athlete	Event	Pool matches			Quarterfinals	Semifinals	Final / BM	
Athlete	Event	Opposition Score	Opposition Score	Rank	Opposition Score	Opposition Score	Opposition Score	Rank
Jules Menard; Sonia Heckel	Pairs BC3	Australia (AUS); L 2–5	Japan (JPN); W 3*–3	2 Q	Thailand (THA); L 1–6	Did not advance		8
Aurélien Fabre; Fayçal Meguenni; Aurélie Aubert	Team BC1–2	Indonesia (INA); L 3–8	Netherlands (NED); W 8–2	2 Q	China (CHN); L 4–7	Did not advance		7

== Cycling ==
Mathieu Bosredon, Anne-Sophie Centis, Elie de Carvalho, Dorian Foulon, Joseph Fritsch, Heïdi Gaugain, Florian Jouanny, Alexandre Léauté, Kévin Le Cunff, Gatien Le Rousseau, Alexandre Lloveras, Marie Patouillet, Thomas Peyroton-Dartet, Johan Quaile, Loïc Vergnaud and Anaïs Vincent have all qualified to compete.

=== Road ===
Men

Athlete	Event	Result	Rank
Elie de Carvalho (pilot: Mickaël Guichard)	Road race B	2:56:47	4
Elie de Carvalho (pilot: Mickaël Guichard)	Time trial B	34:23.73	2nd place, silver medalist(s)
Alexandre Lloveras (pilot: Yoann Paillot)	Road race B	2:55:18	3rd place, bronze medalist(s)
Alexandre Lloveras (pilot: Yoann Paillot)	Time trial B	34:55.32	4
Florian Jouanny	Road race H1–2	1:20:18	1st place, gold medalist(s)
Florian Jouanny	Time trial H2	25:19.29	3rd place, bronze medalist(s)
Mathieu Bosredon	Road race H3	1:34:36	1st place, gold medalist(s)
Mathieu Bosredon	Time trial H3	43:33.22	1st place, gold medalist(s)
Johan Quaile	Road race H3	1:35:57	2nd place, silver medalist(s)
Johan Quaile	Time trial H3	45:33.41	2nd place, silver medalist(s)
Joseph Fritsch	Road race H4	DNF	
Joseph Fritsch	Time trial H4	42:01.45	4
Loïc Vergnaud	Road race H5	1:34:27	2nd place, silver medalist(s)
Loïc Vergnaud	Time trial H5	43:20.40	2nd place, silver medalist(s)
Alexandre Léauté	Road race C1–3	1:43:43	3rd place, bronze medalist(s)
Alexandre Léauté	Time trial C2	19:24.45	1st place, gold medalist(s)
Thomas Peyroton-Dartet	Road race C1–3	1:43:19	2nd place, silver medalist(s)
Thomas Peyroton-Dartet	Time trial C3	38:28.80	1st place, gold medalist(s)
Kévin Le Cunff	Road race C4–5	2:18:59	2nd place, silver medalist(s)
Kévin Le Cunff	Time trial C4	36:46.49	1st place, gold medalist(s)
Gatien Le Rousseau	Road race C4–5	2:18:59	4
Gatien Le Rousseau	Time trial C4	37:18.38	2nd place, silver medalist(s)
Dorian Foulon	Road race C4–5	2:25:58	8
Dorian Foulon	Time trial C5	36:49.84	3rd place, bronze medalist(s)

Women

Athlete	Event	Result	Rank
Anne-Sophie Centis (pilot: Elise Delzenne)	Road race B	2:42:54	5
Anne-Sophie Centis (pilot: Elise Delzenne)	Time trial B	41:39.65	4
Anaïs Vincent	Road race H1–4	56:23	5
Anaïs Vincent	Time trial H1–4	26:59.15	5
Heïdi Gaugain	Road race C4–5	1:54:24	2nd place, silver medalist(s)
Heïdi Gaugain	Time trial C5	20:26.84	2nd place, silver medalist(s)
Marie Patouillet	Road race C4–5	2:00:46	5
Marie Patouillet	Time trial C5	21:49.72	5

Mixed

Athlete	Event	Result	Rank
Mathieu Bosredon; Florian Jouanny; Joseph Fritsch	Team relay H1–5	24:12	1st place, gold medalist(s)

=== Track ===
Men

Athlete	Event	Qualification		Final	
Athlete	Event	Time	Rank	Opposition Time	Rank
Alexandre Lloveras (pilot: Yoann Paillot)	Pursuit B	4:06.920	5	Did not advance	
Alexandre Léauté	Time trial C1–3	1:04.279	2 Q	1:04.207	3rd place, bronze medalist(s)
Alexandre Léauté	Pursuit C2	3:24.298	1 QG	Vromant (BEL); W 3:26.015–3:28.062	1st place, gold medalist(s)
Thomas Peyroton-Dartet	Time trial C1–3	1:10.784	9	Did not advance	
Thomas Peyroton-Dartet	Pursuit C3	3:28.192	6	Did not advance	
Kévin Le Cunff	Pursuit C4	4:25.283	3 QB	Bronze medal final Le Rousseau (FRA); L 4:28.380–4:24.096	4
Gatien Le Rousseau	Time trial C4–5	1:09.881	19	Did not advance	
Gatien Le Rousseau	Pursuit C4	4:25.366	4 QB	Bronze medal final Le Cunff (FRA); L 4:28.380–4:24.096	3rd place, bronze medalist(s)
Dorian Foulon	Time trial C4–5	1:06.392	11	Did not advance	
Dorian Foulon	Pursuit C5	4:13.934	1 QG	Dementyev (UKR); W 3:26.015–3:28.062	1st place, gold medalist(s)

Women

Athlete	Event	Qualification		Final	
Athlete	Event	Time	Rank	Opposition Time	Rank
Anne-Sophie Centis (pilot: Elise Delzenne)	Pursuit B	DSQ		Did not advance	
Marie Patouillet	Time trial C4–5	36.677	3 Q	36.700	2nd place, silver medalist(s)
Marie Patouillet	Pursuit C5	3:35.285	2 QG	Gaugain (FRA); W 3:35.691–3:37.723	1st place, gold medalist(s)
Heïdi Gaugain	Time trial C4–5	39.963	11	Did not advance	
Heïdi Gaugain	Pursuit C5	3:33.881	1 QG	Patouillet (FRA); L 3:37.723–3:35.691	2nd place, silver medalist(s)

Mixed

Athlete	Event	Qualification		Final	
Athlete	Event	Time	Rank	Opposition Time	Rank
Gatien Le Rousseau; Kévin Le Cunff; Alexandre Léauté	Team sprint C1–5	50.004	4 QB	Bronze medal final Australia (AUS); L 49.961–49.036	4

Qualification Legend: QB = Final bronze medal; QG = Final gold medal; QF = Final

== Equestrian ==
As host nation, France directly qualifies a team of four athletes.

Individual

Athlete	Horse	Event	Qualification		Final	
Athlete	Horse	Event	Score	Rank	Score	Rank
Chiara Zenati	Swing Royal	Individual championship test grade III	—N/a		70.533	5
Chiara Zenati	Swing Royal	Individual freestyle test grade III	70.533	5 Q	75.914	4
Alexia Pittier	Sultan 768	Individual championship test grade IV	—N/a		70.806	8
Alexia Pittier	Sultan 768	Individual freestyle test grade IV	70.806	8 Q	75.795	7
Vladimir Vinchon	Pegase Mayenne	Individual championship test grade IV	—N/a		72.889	4
Vladimir Vinchon	Pegase Mayenne	Individual freestyle test grade IV	72.889	4 Q	76.230	5
Lisa Cez	Stallone de Hus	Individual championship test grade V	—N/a		63.282	17
Lisa Cez	Stallone de Hus	Individual freestyle test grade V	63.282	17	Did not advance	

Team

Athlete	Horse	Event	Individual score	Total	
Athlete	Horse	Event	TT	Score	Rank
Alexia Pittier	See above	Team open	71.892	220.506	5
Vladimir Vinchon	See above	Team open	75.081	220.506	5
Chiara Zenati	See above	Team open	73.533	220.506	5

== Goalball ==
Summary

Team	Event	Group Stage				Quarterfinal	Semifinal	Final / BM	
Team	Event	Opposition Score	Opposition Score	Opposition Score	Rank	Opposition Score	Opposition Score	Opposition Score	Rank
France men's	Men's tournament	Brazil; L 5–8	Iran; L 8–12	United States; L 4–5	4 Q	China; L 2–12	Did not advance	Seventh place match Egypt; W 6–4	7
France women's	Women's tournament	Canada; L 0–10	South Korea; L 1–6	Japan; L 0–6	4 Q	China; L 2–12	Did not advance	Seventh place match South Korea; L 2–2 (1–2 p)	8

=== Men's tournament ===
The French men's team qualified for the games directly using their quota as host.

Team roster

Coach: Vivien Fournier Dit Chabert

The following is the France squad in the goalball tournament of the 2024 Summer Paralympics.

No.	Player	Class	Date of birth (age)
1	Haris Neimarlija	B1	29 May 1985 (aged 39)
2	Elias Ouni	B3	3 January 2006 (aged 18)
3	Nabil Baich	B3	24 September 1989 (aged 34)
4	Thomas Ramos-Martins	B2	3 May 1996 (aged 28)
5	Kada Boualia	B2	10 June 1988 (aged 36)
6	Ambroise Daudin	B3	14 April 1981 (aged 43)

Group stage

Pos	Team	Pld	W	D	L	GF	GA	GD	Pts	Qualification
1	Brazil	3	2	1	0	28	20	+8	7	Quarter-finals
2	United States	3	2	0	1	27	24	+3	6	Quarter-finals
3	Iran	3	1	1	1	26	29	−3	4	Quarter-finals
4	France (H)	3	0	0	3	17	25	−8	0	Quarter-finals

Source: Paris 2024
(H) Hosts
29 August 2024
17:30

Brazil	8–5	France
Dantas 1', 4', 5', 8'; Sousa 4'; Moreno 14'; Marques 15', 16'	Report	Ouni 1', 1'; Boualia 5'; Baich 11'; Daudin 17'

South Paris Arena, Paris
Referee:
Azhi Mahmood (Iraq)
Manar Obeidat (Jordan)

30 August 2024
13:15

France	8–12	Iran
Ouni 0', 9', 11', 15', 22'; Boualia 1'; Baich 13', 17'	Report	Jafari 2', 4', 6', 7', 7', 9', 12', 22'; Sarafraz 10'; Souri 17', 17'; Parnia Jomairan 23'

South Paris Arena, Paris
Referee:
Juha Vuokila (Finland)
Azhi Mahmood (Iraq)

31 August 2024
13:15

United States	5–4	France
King 0'; Merren 3', 13', 17'; Young 16'	Report	Baich 6', 18'; Ouni 14', 21'

South Paris Arena, Paris
Referee:
Janice Dawson (Canada)
Azhi Mahmood (Iraq)

Quarter-finals

2 September 2024
17:45

China	12–2	France
Yang 1', 2', 6', 7', 9', 10', 13', 14', 14', 15'; Yu Deyi 1'	Report	Baich 9', 12'

South Paris Arena, Paris
Referee:
Patrik Larsson (Sweden)
Claude Dagenais (Canada)

Seventh place match

3 September 2024
09:00

France	6–4	Egypt
Boualia 0', 1'; Baich 3', 18'; Daudin 9'; Ouni 10'	Report	Mohamed 0', 18'; Awwad 3', 6'

South Paris Arena, Paris
Referee:
Kazuto Ono (Japan)
Janice Dawson (Canada)

=== Women's tournament ===
The French women's team qualified for the games directly using their quota as host.

Team roster

Coach: Anthony Puaud

The following is the France squad in the goalball tournament of the 2024 Summer Paralympics.

No.	Player	Class	Date of birth (age)
3	Melda Alhan	B2	31 May 2005 (aged 19)
4	Coralie Gonzalez	B1	2 April 1988 (aged 36)
5	Adelia Ajami	B3	1 April 2003 (aged 21)
7	Gwendoline Matos	B2	29 December 1993 (aged 30)
8	Loise Rondepierre	B3	8 February 1998 (aged 26)
9	Jahmali Berquier	B2	9 January 2003 (aged 21)

Group stage

Pos	Team	Pld	W	D	L	GF	GA	GD	Pts	Qualification
1	Japan	3	3	0	0	11	2	+9	9	Quarter-finals
2	Canada	3	1	1	1	11	2	+9	4	Quarter-finals
3	South Korea	3	1	1	1	7	4	+3	4	Quarter-finals
4	France (H)	3	0	0	3	1	22	−21	0	Quarter-finals

Source: Paris 2024
Rules for classification: 1) points; 2) goal difference; 3) number of wins; 4) goals against; 5) head-to-head goal difference.
(H) Hosts
29 August 2024
14:45

Canada	10–0	France
Salehizadeh 1', 4'; Reinke 1', 5', 9', 20', 20', 21'; Mahon 13'; Burk 22'	Report

South Paris Arena, Paris
Referee:
Antonios Christodoulos (Greece)
Juha Vuokila (Finland)

31 August 2024
19:00

France	1–6	South Korea
Ajami 0'	Report	Sim Seon-hwa 3', 14', 15', 16'; Park Eun-ji 14', 15'

South Paris Arena, Paris
Referee:
Kazuto Ono (Japan)
Sarah Kuper (Germany)

1 September 2024
19:00

France	0–6	Japan
	Report	Hagiwara 1'; Komiya 10', 18'; Temma 11'; Arai 12'; Amuro 22'

South Paris Arena, Paris
Referee:
Linda Welborn (United States)
Janice Dawson (Canada)

Quarter-finals

3 September 2024
13:30

China	12–2	France
Cao 1', 3', 7', 18', 19', 21', 22'; Zhang 15', 17', 17'; Wang Chunyan 20'; Wang Chunhua 22'	Report	Rondpierre 13'; Ajami 17' (pen.)

South Paris Arena, Paris
Referee:
Manar Obeidat (Jordan)
Patrik Larsson (Sweden)

Seventh place match

4 September 2024
10:00

South Korea	2–2	France
Sim Seon-hwa 3'; Seo Min-ji 11'	Report	Rondepierre 7'; Ajami 20'
Penalties
Kim Hee-jin (penalty missed); Sim Seon-hwa (penalty missed); Seo Min-ji (penalty missed); Park Eun-ji (penalty scored); Kim Eun-ji (penalty scored); Choi Eum-jee (penalty missed)	2–1	(penalty missed) Gonzalez; (penalty scored) Berquier; (penalty missed) Ajami; (penalty missed) Matos; (penalty missed) Rondepierre; (penalty missed) Alhan

South Paris Arena, Paris
Referee:
Patrik Larsson (Sweden)
Claude Dagenais (Canada)

== Judo ==
As host nation, France directly qualifies seven male and two female judoka.

Men

Athlete	Event	Round of 16	Quarterfinals	Semifinals	Repechage 1	Repechage 2	Final / BM	
Athlete	Event	Opposition Result	Opposition Result	Opposition Result	Opposition Result	Opposition Result	Opposition Result	Rank
Armindo Rodrigues	–73 kg J1	Kato (JPN); W 10–00	Shamey (KAZ); L 00–10	Did not advance	Bye	Iafa (POR); L 00–10	Did not advance	7
Cyril Jonard	–90 kg J1	Al-Gburi (IRQ); W 10–00	Crețul (MDA); W 01–00	Powell (GBR); L 00–01	—N/a	Bye	Bronze medal final Abdiev (UZB); W 10–00	3rd place, bronze medalist(s)
Jason Grandry	+90 kg J1	—N/a	Zakiyev (AZE); W 10–00	Basoc (MDA); L 00–10	—N/a	Bye	Bronze medal final Taştan (TUR); W 10–00	3rd place, bronze medalist(s)
Anatole Rubin	–60 kg J2	Gavilán (ESP); L 00–10	Did not advance					9
Nathan Petit	–73 kg J2	Bye	Kuranbaev (UZB); L 00–10	Did not advance	Kornhaß (GER); W 10–00	Vargoczki (ROM); W 10–00	Bronze medal final Bareikis (LTU); L 00–01	5
Hélios Latchoumanaya	–90 kg J2	Bye	Kizilashvili (GEO); W 01–00	Casanova (BRA); W 11–00	—N/a	Bye	Nazarenko (UKR); L 00–01	2nd place, silver medalist(s)
Nacer Zorgani	+90 kg J2	—N/a	Skelley (GBR); L 00–10	Did not advance	—N/a	Bye	Bronze medal final Shukurbekov (KAZ); L 00–11	5

Women

Athlete	Event	Round of 16	Quarterfinals	Semifinals	Repechage	Final / BM	
Athlete	Event	Opposition Result	Opposition Result	Opposition Result	Opposition Result	Opposition Result	Rank
Sandrine Martinet	–48 kg J2	—N/a	Thal (GER); W 11–00	Li (CHN); W 10–01	Bye	Nauatbek (KAZ); L 00–10	2nd place, silver medalist(s)
Prescillia Lézé	+70 kg J2	Bye	Costa (ITA); L 00–10	Did not advance	Karimova (AZE); L 00–10	Did not advance	7

== Paracanoeing ==
France earned quota places for the following events through the 2023 ICF Canoe Sprint World Championships in Duisburg, Germany; and 2024 ICF Canoe Sprint World Championships in Szeged, Hungary.

Athlete	Event	Heats		Semifinal		Final	
Athlete	Event	Time	Rank	Time	Rank	Time	Rank
Rémy Boullé	Men's KL1	48.41	2 SF	48.40	1 FA	47.01	3rd place, bronze medalist(s)
Abel Aber	Men's VL3	50.78	3 SF	50.81	3 FA	49.35	6
Nélia Barbosa	Women's KL3	48.50	1 FA	Bye		47.91	2nd place, silver medalist(s)
Eléa Charvet	Women's VL3	1:02.71	5 SF	1:01.98	4 FB	1:01.65	9

Qualification Legend: FA – Qualify to medal final; FB – Qualify to non-medal final; SF – Qualify to semifinal

== Paratriathlon ==
Men

Athlete	Event	Time						Rank
Athlete	Event	Swim (750 m)	Trans 1	Bike (20 km)	Trans 2	Run (5 km)	Total	Rank
Louis Noël	PTWC	14:19	1:14	35:20	0:30	12:17	1:03:40	4
Jules Ribstein	PTS2	11:01	1:14	32:40	1:02	19:50	1:05:47	1st place, gold medalist(s)
Geoffrey Wersy	PTS2	16:16	1:17	35:45	2:18	21:23	1:16:59	7
Cédric Denuzière	PTS3	12:49	1:31	34:31	0:41	21:02	1:10:34	5
Michaël Herter	PTS3	14:36	1:43	35:29	1:04	24:27	1:17:19	9
Pierre-Antoine Baele	PTS4	10:49	1:13	31:12	0:28	17:43	1:01:25	4
Grégoire Berthon	PTS4	10:38	0:58	31:08	0:37	19:42	1:03:03	5
Alexis Hanquinquant	PTS4	9:35	1:24	29:48	0:33	16:41	58:01	1st place, gold medalist(s)
Antoine Perel (guide: Yohan Le Berre)	PTVI	12:44	0:52	28:15	0:32	18:02	1:00:25	3rd place, bronze medalist(s)
Thibaut Rigaudeau (guide: Cyril Viennot)	PTVI	13:38	0:41	27:37	0:32	17:37	1:00:05	2nd place, silver medalist(s)

Women

Athlete	Event	Time						Rank
Athlete	Event	Swim (750 m)	Trans 1	Bike (20 km)	Trans 2	Run (5 km)	Total	Rank
Mona Francis	PTWC	16:22	1:05	40:52	0:40	15:25	1:14:24	6
Cécile Saboureau	PTS2	13:57	1:59	38:52	1:14	25:41	1:21:43	6
Élise Marc	PTS4	15:49	1:39	37:37	0:38	21:17	1:17:00	5
Camille Sénéclauze	PTS4	14:52	1:07	37:34	0:47	22:23	1:16:43	4
Gwladys Lemoussu	PTS5	14:29	1:07	37:06	0:38	20:43	1:14:03	6
Héloïse Courvoisier (guide: Anne Henriet)	PTVI	16:36	0:58	32:00	0:44	20:45	1:11:03	7
Annouck Curzillat (guide: Julie Marano)	PTVI	13:30	1:12	32:50	0:46	22:10	1:10:28	5

== Powerlifting ==
Alex Adélaïde, Rafik Arabat, Axel Bourlon and Souhad Ghazouani have all qualified to compete.

Athlete	Event	Attempts (kg)				Result	Rank
Athlete	Event	1	2	3	PL	Result	Rank
Alex Adélaïde	Men's –49 kg	160	~~165~~	~~172~~	—N/a	160	6
Axel Bourlon	Men's –54 kg	~~163~~	~~169~~	~~169~~	—N/a	NM	
Rafik Arabat	Men's –97 kg	200	~~209~~	~~213~~	—N/a	200	9
Souhad Ghazouani	Women's –67 kg	125	~~129~~	~~133~~	—N/a	125	7

== Rowing ==
French rowers qualified boats in each of the following classes at the 2023 World Rowing Championships in Belgrade, Serbia; and 2024 Final Paralympic Qualification Regatta in Lucerne, Switzerland.

Athlete	Event	Heats		Repechage		Final	
Athlete	Event	Time	Rank	Time	Rank	Time	Rank
Alexis Sanchez	PR1 men's single sculls	9:21.58	3 R	9:24.71	2 FA	9:46.60	5
Nathalie Benoit	PR1 women's single sculls	10:19.12	2 R	10:24.82	1 FA	10:34.40	3rd place, bronze medalist(s)
Perle Bouge; Benjamin Daviet	PR2 mixed double sculls	8:10.40	3 R	8:29.61	1 FA	8:47.64	5
Laurent Cadot; Guylaine Marchand	PR3 mixed double sculls	7:24.25	2 R	7:32.90	2 FA	7:51.94	6
Grégoire Bireau; Margot Boulet; Candyce Chafa; Rémy Taranto; Emilie Acquistapace (cox)	PR3 mixed coxed four	7:02.13	2 FA	Bye		7:03.11	3rd place, bronze medalist(s)

Qualification Legend: FA=Final A (medal); FB=Final B (non-medal); R=Repechage

== Shooting ==
As host nation, France entered nine para-shooter's after achieved quota places for the following events by virtue of their best finishes at the 2022, 2023 and 2024 world cup, 2022 World Championships, 2023 World Championships, 2023 European Para Championships and 2024 European Championships, as long as they obtained a minimum qualifying score (MQS) by July 15, 2024.

Men

Athlete	Event	Qualification		Final	
Athlete	Event	Points	Rank	Points	Rank
Jean-Louis Michaud	R1 – 10 m air rifle standing SH1	597.0	18	Did not advance	
Didier Richard	R1 – 10 m air rifle standing SH1	615.4	12	Did not advance	
Jean-Louis Michaud	R7 – 50 m rifle 3 positions SH1	1173	3 Q	397.0	7
Didier Richard	R7 – 50 m rifle 3 positions SH1	1135	14	Did not advance	

Women

Athlete	Event	Qualification		Final	
Athlete	Event	Points	Rank	Points	Rank
Gaëlle Edon	P2 – 10 m air pistol SH1	567	3 Q	171.9	5

Mixed

Athlete	Event	Qualification		Final	
Athlete	Event	Points	Rank	Points	Rank
Gaëlle Edon	P3 – 25 m pistol SH1	569-14x	9	Did not advance	
Romain Sellemoutou	P3 – 25 m pistol SH1	559-8x	17	Did not advance	
Cédric Fèvre-Chevalier	R3 – 10 m air rifle prone SH1	630.7	18	Did not advance	
Tanguy de La Forest	R4 – 10 m air rifle standing SH2	638.2	1 Q	253.1	2nd place, silver medalist(s)
Kévin Liot	R4 – 10 m air rifle standing SH2	629.9	16	Did not advance	
Pierre Guillaume-Sage	R5 – 10 m air rifle prone SH2	626.8	32	Did not advance	
Tanguy de La Forest	R5 – 10 m air rifle prone SH2	636.5	7 Q	255.4	1st place, gold medalist(s)
Cédric Fèvre-Chevalier	R6 – 50 m rifle prone SH1	616.2	21	Did not advance	
Jean-Louis Michaud	R6 – 50 m rifle prone SH1	625.5	5 Q	227.8	3rd place, bronze medalist(s)
Justine Bève	R9 – 50 m rifle prone SH2	626.7	1 Q	164.2	6
Tanguy de La Forest	R9 – 50 m rifle prone SH2	622.0	7 Q	206.6	4

== Sitting volleyball ==
Summary

Team	Event	Group Stage				Semifinal	Final / BM	
Team	Event	Opposition Score	Opposition Score	Opposition Score	Rank	Opposition Score	Opposition Score	Rank
France men's	Men's tournament	Kazakhstan; L 0–3	Egypt; L 0–3	Bosnia and Herzegovina; L 0–3	4	Did not advance	Seventh place match Ukraine; L 0–3	8
France women's	Women's tournament	Italy; L 0–3	United States; L 0–3	China; L 0–3	4	Did not advance	Seventh place match Rwanda; L 0–3	8

=== Men's tournament ===
France men's sitting volleyball team qualified for the games as host.

Team roster

- Mamadou Alpha Bah
- Cyrille Chahboune
- Gildas Guiheneuf
- Matthieu Jagu
- Benjamin Lacroix-Desmazes
- Thomas Laronce
- Thibaud Lefrancois
- Benjamin Pillerault
- Jean-Christophe Rambeau
- Damien Roget
- Morgan Troussard
- Romain Wolniewicz

Group play

Pos	Team	Pld	W	L	Pts	SW	SL	SR	SPW	SPL	SPR	Qualification
1	Bosnia and Herzegovina	3	3	0	3	9	3	3.000	280	228	1.228	Semifinals
2	Egypt	3	2	1	2	7	4	1.750	259	214	1.210	Semifinals
3	Kazakhstan	3	1	2	1	6	6	1.000	257	226	1.137	Fifth place match
4	France (H)	3	0	3	0	0	9	0.000	100	225	0.444	Seventh place match

Source: Paris 2024
(H) Host

29 August 2024; 20:00	France	0–3	Kazakhstan	North Paris Arena, Paris; Attendance: 4,072; Referees: Khalid Shanishah (LBA), Mirza Basic (BIH)
29 August 2024; 20:00	(7–25, 20–25, 7–25); P2 Report			North Paris Arena, Paris; Attendance: 4,072; Referees: Khalid Shanishah (LBA), Mirza Basic (BIH)

31 August 2024; 18:00	France	0–3	Egypt	North Paris Arena, Paris; Attendance: 3,872; Referees: Andre Calado Ferreira (BRA), Neal Konowalyk (GER)
31 August 2024; 18:00	(11–25, 3–25, 12–25); P2 Report			North Paris Arena, Paris; Attendance: 3,872; Referees: Andre Calado Ferreira (BRA), Neal Konowalyk (GER)

2 September 2024; 20:00	Bosnia and Herzegovina	3–0	France	North Paris Arena, Paris; Attendance: 2,338; Referees: Krisztina Arpas (HUN), Mahdi Navidino (IRN)
2 September 2024; 20:00	(25–12, 25–13, 25–15); P2 Report			North Paris Arena, Paris; Attendance: 2,338; Referees: Krisztina Arpas (HUN), Mahdi Navidino (IRN)

Seventh place match

4 September 2024; 12:00	France	0–3	Ukraine	North Paris Arena, Paris; Attendance: 2,583; Referees: Mahdi Navidino (IRN), Mirza Basic (BIH)
4 September 2024; 12:00	(16–25, 11–25, 18–25); P2 Report			North Paris Arena, Paris; Attendance: 2,583; Referees: Mahdi Navidino (IRN), Mirza Basic (BIH)

=== Women's tournament ===
France women's sitting volleyball team qualified for the games as host.

Team roster

- Jenna Agbodjan Prince
- Séverine Baillot
- Estelle Marsa-Galant
- Aurélie Garcia
- Olivia Lanes
- Julie Ligner
- Lynda Medjaheri
- Karen Faimali-Meger
- Anais Rigal

Group play

Pos	Team	Pld	W	L	Pts	SW	SL	SR	SPW	SPL	SPR	Qualification
1	China	3	3	0	3	9	1	9.000	247	147	1.680	Semifinals
2	United States	3	2	1	2	7	3	2.333	237	167	1.419	Semifinals
3	Italy	3	1	2	1	3	6	0.500	177	171	1.035	Fifth place match
4	France (H)	3	0	3	0	0	9	0.000	49	225	0.218	Seventh place match

Source: Paris 2024
(H) Host

30 August 2024; 20:00	France	0–3	Italy	North Paris Arena, Paris; Attendance: 3,752; Referees: Marie-Claude Richer (CAN), Khalid Shanishah (LBA)
30 August 2024; 20:00	(9–25, 6–25, 6–25); P2 Report			North Paris Arena, Paris; Attendance: 3,752; Referees: Marie-Claude Richer (CAN), Khalid Shanishah (LBA)

1 September 2024; 20:15	France	0–3	United States	North Paris Arena, Paris; Attendance: 3,874; Referees: Mahdi Navidino (IRN), Neal Konowalyk (GER)
1 September 2024; 20:15	(5–25, 1–25, 5–25); P2 Report			North Paris Arena, Paris; Attendance: 3,874; Referees: Mahdi Navidino (IRN), Neal Konowalyk (GER)

3 September 2024; 20:20	China	3–0	France	North Paris Arena, Paris; Attendance: 2,377; Referees: Mahdi Navidino (IRN), Krisztina Arpas (HUN)
3 September 2024; 20:20	(25–7, 25–5, 25–5); P2 Report			North Paris Arena, Paris; Attendance: 2,377; Referees: Mahdi Navidino (IRN), Krisztina Arpas (HUN)

Seventh place match

4 September 2024; 14:00	France	0–3	Rwanda	North Paris Arena, Paris; Attendance: 2,583; Referees: Amina Elsergany (EGY), Marie-Claude Richer (CAN)
4 September 2024; 14:00	(9–25, 8–25, 11–25); P2 Report			North Paris Arena, Paris; Attendance: 2,583; Referees: Amina Elsergany (EGY), Marie-Claude Richer (CAN)

== Swimming ==
As the host nation, France secured fourteen quotas at the 2023 World Para Swimming Championships after finishing in the top two places in Paralympic class disciplines and Paralympic qualification ranking.

Men

Athlete	Event	Heat		Final	
Athlete	Event	Time	Rank	Time	Rank
Dimitri Granjux	50 m freestyle S4	41.89	9	Did not advance	
David Smetanine	50 m freestyle S4	42.97	11	Did not advance	
Hector Denayer	50 m freestyle S9	26.48	11	Did not advance	
Ugo Didier	50 m freestyle S9	26.20	9	Did not advance	
Dimitri Granjux	100 m freestyle S4	1:29.09	9	Did not advance	
David Smetanine	100 m freestyle S4	1:30.36	10	Did not advance	
Laurent Chardard	100 m freestyle S6	1:05.33	2 Q	1:05.28	3rd place, bronze medalist(s)
Kylian Portal	100 m freestyle S12	54.49	6 Q	54.37	6
Dimitri Granjux	200 m freestyle S4	3:16.17	11	Did not advance	
David Smetanine	200 m freestyle S4	3:15.32	10	Did not advance	
Ugo Didier	400 m freestyle S9	4:21.28	4 Q	4:12.55	1st place, gold medalist(s)
Alex Portal	400 m freestyle S13	4:12.99	1 Q	4:00.21	2nd place, silver medalist(s)
Kylian Portal	400 m freestyle S13	4:14.07	4 Q	4:05.99	3rd place, bronze medalist(s)
Dimitri Granjux	50 m backstroke S4	46.99	9	Did not advance	
Ugo Didier	100 m backstroke S9	1:02.89	2 Q	1:01.48	2nd place, silver medalist(s)
Alex Portal	100 m backstroke S13	59.56	3 Q	59.08	3rd place, bronze medalist(s)
Hector Denayer	100 m breaststroke SB9	1:08.05	3 Q	1:05.91	2nd place, silver medalist(s)
Laurent Chardard	50 m butterfly S6	32.15	3 Q	31.65	3rd place, bronze medalist(s)
Hector Denayer	100 m butterfly S9	1:02.89	9	Did not advance	
Kylian Portal	100 m butterfly S12	58.73	4 Q	58.17	4
Alex Portal	100 m butterfly S13	55.25	2 Q	54.38	2nd place, silver medalist(s)
Dimitri Granjux	150 m individual medley SM4	2:50.32	6 Q	2:48.38	5
Hector Denayer	200 m individual medley SM9	2:22.64	8 Q	2:17.34	3rd place, bronze medalist(s)
Ugo Didier	200 m individual medley SM9	2:20.04	2 Q	2:15.98	2nd place, silver medalist(s)
Alex Portal	200 m individual medley SM13	2:15.63	4 Q	2:06.66	2nd place, silver medalist(s)

Women

Athlete	Event	Heat		Final	
Athlete	Event	Time	Rank	Time	Rank
Emeline Pierre	50 m freestyle S10	28.18	6 Q	27.77	5
Élodie Lorandi	100 m freestyle S10	1:03.47	14	Did not advance	
Emeline Pierre	100 m freestyle S10	1:01.51	3 Q	1:00.49	1st place, gold medalist(s)
Léane Morceau	100 m freestyle S12	1:06.55	10	Did not advance	
Assya Maurin-Espiau	200 m freestyle S14	2:22.14	13	Did not advance	
Agathe Pauli	400 m freestyle S9	4:54.30	7 Q	4:49.66	6
Élodie Lorandi	400 m freestyle S10	4:50.42	6 Q	4:52.43	6
Solène Sache	50 m backstroke S5	51.32	14	Did not advance	
Emeline Pierre	100 m backstroke S10	1:10.36	4 Q	1:09.44	3rd place, bronze medalist(s)
Anaëlle Roulet	100 m backstroke S10	1:10.39	5 Q	1:10.48	7
Léane Morceau	100 m backstroke S12	1:15.04	7 Q	1:12.85	4
Assya Maurin-Espiau	100 m backstroke S14	1:11.45	9	Did not advance	
Solène Sache	100 m breaststroke SB4	2:03.98	9	Did not advance	
Assya Maurin-Espiau	100 m breaststroke SB14	1:19.43	5 Q	1:19.26	5
Solène Sache	50 m butterfly S5	53.77	9	Did not advance	
Léane Morceau	100 m butterfly S13	1:11.02	14	Did not advance	
Solène Sache	200 m individual medley SM5	4:07.07	11	Did not advance	
Élodie Lorandi	200 m individual medley SM10	DNS		Did not advance	
Assya Maurin-Espiau	200 m individual medley SM14	2:38.18	11	Did not advance	

Mixed

Athlete	Event	Heat		Final	
Athlete	Event	Time	Rank	Time	Rank
Laurent Chardard; Ugo Didier; Agathe Pauli; Emeline Pierre	4 × 100 m freestyle relay 34 pts	—N/a		4:06.91	5
Laurent Chardard; Hector Denayer; Agathe Pauli; Anaëlle Roulet	4 × 100 m medley relay 34 pts	4:37.18	5 Q	4:34.33	7

== Table tennis ==
As the host nation, France entered nineteen athletes for the Paralympic games. All of them qualified through the allocations of the final ITTF world ranking.

Men

Athlete	Event	Round of 32	Round of 16	Quarterfinals	Semifinals	Final / BM	
Athlete	Event	Opposition Result	Opposition Result	Opposition Result	Opposition Result	Opposition Result	Rank
Fabien Lamirault	Individual C2	Bye	Toledo (ESP); W 3–1	Park (KOR); W 3–0	Suchánek (CZE); L 1–3	Did not advance	3rd place, bronze medalist(s)
Julien Michaud	Individual C2	Bye	Czuper (POL); L 0–3	Did not advance			
Florian Merrien	Individual C3	Bye	Baek (KOR); W 3–1	Schmidberger (GER); L 0–3	Did not advance		
Sylvain Noël	Individual C3	Bye	Van Emburgh (USA); L 1–3	Did not advance			
Maxime Thomas	Individual C4	—N/a	Saito (JPN); W 3–0	Ogunkunle (NGR); L 1–3	Did not advance		
Emeric Martin	Individual C4	—N/a	Sichino (JPN); L 0–3	Did not advance			
Nicolas Savant-Aira	Individual C5	—N/a	Romero (ARG); W 3–0	Urhaug (NOR); L 1–3	Did not advance		
Esteban Herrault	Individual C6	—N/a	Torres (CHI); L 2–3	Did not advance			
Stéphane Messi	Individual C7	—N/a	Bayley (GBR); L 0–3	Did not advance			
Kevin Dourbecker	Individual C7	—N/a	Yagi (JPN); L 0–3	Did not advance			
Thomas Bouvais	Individual C8	Bye	Didukh (UKR); L 0–3	Did not advance			
Clément Berthier	Individual C8	Bye	Chudzicki (POL); W 3–2	Nikolenko (UKR); L 2–3	Did not advance		
Lucas Didier	Individual C9	—N/a	Adesope (NGR); W 3–0	Cardona (ESP); W 3–1	Ma (AUS); W 3–2	Devos (BEL); L 0–3	2nd place, silver medalist(s)
Matéo Bohéas	Individual C10	—N/a	Karpov (NPA); W 3–0	Funayama (JPN); W 3–2	Chojnowski (POL); L 1–3	Did not advance	3rd place, bronze medalist(s)
Lucas Créange	Individual C11	—N/a	Bye	Pálos (HUN); L 0–3	Did not advance		
Fabien Lamirault; Julien Michaud	Doubles MD4	—N/a	Bye	Czuper / Jakimczuk (POL); W 3–2	Jang / Park (KOR); L 1–3	Did not advance	3rd place, bronze medalist(s)
Emeric Martin; Maxime Thomas	Doubles MD8	—N/a	Mihálik / Trávníček (SVK); W 3–0	Cao / Feng (CHN); L 0–3	Did not advance		
Florian Merrien; Nicolas Savant-Aira	Doubles MD8	—N/a	Liu / Zhai (CHN); L 1–3	Did not advance			
Clément Berthier; Esteban Herrault	Doubles MD14	—N/a	Bye	Bayley / Perry (GBR); W 3–2	Liao / Yan (CHN); L 0–3	Did not advance	3rd place, bronze medalist(s)
Kevin Dourbecker; Stéphane Messi	Doubles MD14	—N/a	Karabardak / Shilton (GBR); L 0–3	Did not advance			
Matéo Bohéas; Thomas Bouvais	Doubles MD18	Bye	Ma / Pellissier (AUS); W 3–2	Manara / Massad (BRA); L 1–3	Did not advance		

Women

Athlete	Event	Round of 16	Quarterfinals	Semifinals	Final / BM	
Athlete	Event	Opposition Result	Opposition Result	Opposition Result	Opposition Result	Rank
Flora Vautier	Individual C4	Matić (SRB); W 3–0	Mikolaschek (GER); L 0–3	Did not advance		
Alexandra Saint-Pierre	Individual C5	Bye	Jung (KOR); L 0–3	Did not advance		
Morgen Caillaud	Individual C6	Hammad (EGY); W 3–0	Al-Dayyeni (IRQ); L 0–3	Did not advance		
Thu Kamkasomphou	Individual C8	Bye	Pérez (CHI); L 0–3	Did not advance		
Lucie Hautière	Individual C8	Tomono (JPN); L 0–3	Did not advance			
Léa Ferney	Individual C11	Bye	Acer (TUR); L 1–3	Did not advance		
Alexandra Saint-Pierre; Flora Vautier	Doubles WD10	Di Toro / Sands (AUS); W 3–0	Matić / Perić (SRB); L 2–3	Did not advance		
Morgen Caillaud; Lucie Hautière	Doubles WD14	—N/a	Grebe / Wolf (GER); L 1–3	Did not advance		

Mixed

Athlete	Event	Round of 32	Round of 16	Quarterfinals	Semifinals	Final / BM	
Athlete	Event	Opposition Result	Opposition Result	Opposition Result	Opposition Result	Opposition Result	Rank
Fabien Lamirault; Alexandra Saint-Pierre	Doubles XD7	Bye	Glinbancheun / Jaion (THA); L 0–3	Did not advance			
Florian Merrien; Flora Vautier	Doubles XD7	Bye	Flores / Leonelli (CHI); W 3–0	Kim / Lee (KOR); W 3–2	Feng / Zhou (CHN); L 0–3	Did not advance	3rd place, bronze medalist(s)
Matéo Bohéas; Morgen Caillaud	Doubles XD17	Youssef / Hammad (EGY); W 3–0	Peng / Xiong (CHN); L 0–3	Did not advance			
Lucas Didier; Thu Kamkasomphou	Doubles XD17	Torres / Pérez (CHI); W 3–0	Didukh / Shynkarova (UKR); L 0–3	Did not advance			

== Taekwondo ==
As the host nation, France entered three athletes to compete at the Paralympics competition. All of them qualified for Paris 2024, by virtue of finishing within the top six in the Paralympic rankings in their respective class.

Athlete	Event	Round of 16	Quarterfinals	Semifinals	Repechage	Final / BM	
Athlete	Event	Opposition Result	Opposition Result	Opposition Result	Opposition Result	Opposition Result	Rank
Bopha Kong	Men's –58 kg	Bye	Xiao (TPE); L 1–22	Did not advance	Kaenkham (THA); L 3–21	Did not advance	7
Sophie Caverzan	Women's –57 kg	Bye	Li (CHN); L 5–19	Did not advance	Goverdhan (NEP); L 1–2	Did not advance	7
Djélika Diallo	Women's –65 kg	Bye	Gjessing (DEN); W 6–4	Yao (CHN); W 18–12	Bye	Moura (BRA); L 7–13	2nd place, silver medalist(s)

== Wheelchair basketball ==
Summary

Team	Event	Group Stage				Quarterfinal	Semifinal	Final / BM	
Team	Event	Opposition Score	Opposition Score	Opposition Score	Rank	Opposition Score	Opposition Score	Opposition Score	Rank
France men's	Men's tournament	Canada; L 68–83	Germany; L 64–72	Great Britain; L 50–85	4 Q	United States; L 47–82	Classification qualifying Netherlands; L 63–72	Seventh place match Spain; L 57–72	8

=== Men's tournament ===
France men's has qualified to compete by virtue of their top four results at the 2024 IWBF Men's Repechage in Antibes, France.

Team roster

The following is the France roster in the men's wheelchair basketball tournament of the 2024 Summer Paralympics

France men's national wheelchair basketball team - 2024 Summer Paralympics roster
Players
Coaches

No.	Name	Age – Date of birth	Pts.
4	Remi Bayle	34 – 28 September 1989	2.5
5	Alexis Ramonet	28 – 8 October 1995	4.0
7	Audrey Cayol	43 – 16 July 1981	1.5
8	Jordan Luce	30 – 30 November 1993	4.5
9	Soufyane Mehiaoui	40 – 3 October 1983	3.0
10	Jerome Laureri	38 – 31 May 1986	1.0
25	Christophe Carlier	38 – 4 April 1986	3.0
26	Jerome Duran	43 – 10 May 1981	2.0
29	Louis Hardouin	26 – 19 November 1997	2.5
64	Nicolas Jouanserre	39 – 1 March 1985	4.5
92	Ibrahim Guirassy	42 – 17 July 1982	1.0
93	Mamady Traore	21 – 11 March 2003	4.0

Head coach

Franck Bornerand

Assistant coach(es)

Steve Caine

Legend

- Age - describes age on 29 August 2024

Preliminary round

Pos	Team	Pld	W	L	PF	PA	PD	Pts	Qualification
1	Great Britain	3	3	0	249	163	+86	6	Quarter-finals
2	Canada	3	2	1	209	208	+1	5	Quarter-finals
3	Germany	3	1	2	179	208	−29	4	Quarter-finals
4	France (H)	3	0	3	182	240	−58	3	Quarter-finals

Source: Paris 2024
Rules for classification: 1) Points; 2) Head-to-head results; 3) Points difference; 4) Points scored.
(H) Hosts

30 August 2024
18:15

Report

France	68–83	Canada
Scoring by quarter: 20–26, 21–13, 13–22, 14–22
Pts: Jouanserre 38; Rebs: Bayle, Jouanserre 6 Asts: Mehiaoui 6		Pts: Higgins 38; Rebs: Anderson 12; Asts: Anderson 13

Bercy Arena, Paris
Attendance: 12.726
Referees: Krunoslav Peić

31 August 2024
21:30

Report

Germany	72–64	France
Scoring by quarter: 17–19, 19–15, 14–17, 22–13
Pts: Güntner 22; Rebs: Güntner 11; Asts: Böhme 8		Pts: Jouanserre 22; Rebs: Mehiaoui 8 Asts: Mehiaoui 10

Bercy Arena, Paris
Attendance: 12.778
Referees: Gustavo Mathias

2 September 2024
19:15

Report

France	50–85	Great Britain
Scoring by quarter: 13-21, 14-16, 15-24, 8-24
Pts: Carlier 10; Rebs: Carlier 8 Asts: Mehiaoui 7		Pts: Warburton 20; Rebs: Manning 9 Asts: Pratt 13

Bercy Arena, Paris
Attendance: 12.721
Referees: Cristian Colombatti

Quarterfinal

3 September 2024
21:30

Report

United States	82–47	France
Scoring by quarter: 24-12, 17-15, 27-10, 14-10
Pts: Williams 23; Rebs: Bell 14; Asts: Williams 10		Pts: Carlier 11; Rebs: Carlier 10; Asts: Ramonet 5

Bercy Arena, Paris
Attendance: 12,652
Referees: Blaine Krapljanov

Classification qualifying

5 September 2024
18:15

Report

Netherlands	72–63	France
Scoring by quarter: 20–6, 19–22, 19–19, 14–16
Pts: Op den Orth 23; Rebs: Poggenwisch 11; Asts: Poggenwisch 19		Pts: Jouenserre 21; Rebs: Carlier 10; Asts: Mehiaoui 13

Bercy Arena, Paris
Attendance: 11.470
Referees: Gustavo Mathias

Seventh place match

6 September 2024
13:45

Report

Spain	72–57	France
Scoring by quarter: 16–12, 17–16, 22–13, 17–16
Pts: Ortega 16; Rebs: A. Zarzuela 8 Asts: García 8		Pts: Ramonet 15; Rebs: Bayle 7 Asts: Mehiaoui 7

Bercy Arena, Paris
Attendance: 12.527
Referees: Blaine Krapljanov

== Wheelchair fencing ==
Clémence Delavoipiere, Cécile Demaude, Ludovic Lemoine, Yohan Peter, Damien Tokatlian, Maxime Valet and Brianna Vide had all qualified to compete.

Men

Athlete	Event	Round of 32	Round of 16	Quarterfinal	Semifinal	Repechage 1	Repechage 2	Repechage 3	Repechage 4	Final / BM	
Athlete	Event	Opposition Result	Opposition Result	Opposition Result	Opposition Result	Opposition Result	Opposition Result	Opposition Result	Opposition Result	Opposition Result	Rank
Yohan Peter	Individual épée B	Bye	Hu (CHN); L 11–15	Did not advance		Paolucci (ITA); W 15–3	Guissone (BRA); L 14–15	Did not advance			
Ludovic Lemoine	Individual foil A	Bye	Betti (ITA); L 9–15	Did not advance		Demchuk (UKR); L 10–15	Did not advance				
Damien Tokatlian	Individual foil A	Bye	Al-Madhkhoori (IRQ); W 15–4	Zhong (CHN); L 5–15	Did not advance	Bye	Kano (JPN); W 15–11	Lambertini (ITA); L 4–15	Did not advance		
Maxime Valet	Individual foil B	—N/a	Bye	Hu (CHN); L 8–15	Did not advance	Bye	Chaves (BRA); W 15–6	Naumenko (UKR); L 5–15	Did not advance		
Ludovic Lemoine	Individual sabre A	—N/a	Tian (CHN); L 6–15	Did not advance		Zhong (CHN); W 15–6	Demchuk (UKR); L 9–15	Did not advance			
Maxime Valet	Individual sabre B	—N/a	Kingmanaw (THA); W 15–9	Zhang (CHN); L 7–15	Did not advance	Bye	Chaves (BRA); W 15–5	Tarjányi (HUN); W 15–12	Castro (POL); L 14–15	Did not advance	
Ludovic Lemoine; Yohan Peter; Damien Tokatlian	Team épée	—N/a	Bye	Great Britain (GBR); L 20–45	Did not advance						
Ludovic Lemoine; Damien Tokatlian; Maxime Valet; Yohan Peter	Team foil	—N/a	Bye	Japan (JPN); W 45–32	Great Britain (GBR); L 25–45	—N/a				Bronze medal final Italy (ITA); W 45–36	3rd place, bronze medalist(s)

Women

Athlete	Event	Round of 32	Round of 16	Quarterfinal	Semifinal	Repechage 1	Repechage 2	Repechage 3	Repechage 4	Final / BM	
Athlete	Event	Opposition Result	Opposition Result	Opposition Result	Opposition Result	Opposition Result	Opposition Result	Opposition Result	Opposition Result	Opposition Result	Rank
Clémence Delavoipiere	Individual épée A	Fan (HKG); W 15–8	Menéndez (ESP); L 8–15	Did not advance		Thongdaeng (THA); L 12–15	Did not advance				
Brianna Vide	Individual épée A	Bye	Yu (HKG); W 15–13	Kwon (KOR); L 13–15	Did not advance	Bye	Thongdaeng (THA); L 11–15	Did not advance			
Cécile Demaude	Individual épée B	—N/a	Kang (CHN); L 8–15	Did not advance		Jaimez (VEN); W 15–0	Sakurai (JPN); W 13–15	Did not advance			
Clémence Delavoipiere	Individual foil A	Oliveira (BRA); W 15–5	Hajmási (HUN); L 2–15	Did not advance		Krajnyák (HUN); L 4–15	Did not advance				
Brianna Vide	Individual foil A	Thongdaeng (THA); W 15–11	Gu (CHN); L 5–15	Did not advance		Tibilashvili (GEO); W 15–5	Mogoș (ITA); W 15–8	Morkvych (UKR); W 15–14	Yu (HKG); L 14–15	Did not advance	
Clémence Delavoipiere	Individual sabre A	Mogoș (ITA); L 11–15	Did not advance								
Brianna Vide	Individual sabre A	Bye	Trigilia (ITA); W 15–3	Gu (CHN); L 9–15	Did not advance	Bye	Breus (UKR); W 15–10	Collis-McCann (GBR); W 15–10	Hajmási (HUN); W 15–12	Bronze medal final Tibilashvili (GEO); L 11–15	4
Cécile Demaude	Individual sabre B	—N/a	Xiao (CHN); L 3–15	Did not advance		Ao (CHN); L 2–15	Did not advance				
Clémence Delavoipiere; Cécile Demaude; Brianna Vide	Team épée	—N/a	Bye	Hong Kong (HKG); W 45–41	China (CHN); L 35–45	—N/a				Bronze medal final Thailand (THA); L 40–45	4
Clémence Delavoipiere; Cécile Demaude; Brianna Vide	Team foil	—N/a	Brazil (BRA); W 45–29	Hungary (HUN); L 19–45	Did not advance						

== Wheelchair rugby ==
French wheelchair rugby team qualified as host.

Summary

Event	Group Stage				Semifinal	Final / BM	
Event	Opposition Score	Opposition Score	Opposition Score	Rank	Opposition Score	Opposition Score	Rank
France national team	Denmark; W 53–51	Australia; L 53–55	Great Britain; L 49–50	3	5th to 8th semifinals Germany; W 54–48	Fifth place match Canada; W 53–50	5

Team roster

- Tristan Barfety
- Adrien Chalmin
- Jordan Ducret
- Jonathan Hivernat
- Rodolphe Jarlan
- Corentin Le Guen
- Brice Maurel
- Cédric Nankin
- Ryadh Sallem
- Matthieu Thiriet
- Nicolas Valentim
- Sébastien Verdin

Group stage

Pos	Team	Pld	W	D	L	GF	GA	GD	Pts	Qualification
1	Great Britain	3	3	0	0	163	157	+6	6	Semi-finals
2	Australia	3	2	0	1	163	160	+3	4	Semi-finals
3	France (H)	3	1	0	2	155	156	−1	2	Placings rounds
4	Denmark	3	0	0	3	153	161	−8	0	Placings rounds

Source: Paris 2024
(H) Hosts
29 August 2024
17:30

France	53–51	Denmark
Jonathan Hivernat – 29; Sebastien Verdin – 14; Rodolph Jarlan – 5 Matthieu Thiriet – 1 Jordan Ducret – 1 Corentin le Guen – 1	Report	Sebastien Frederiksen – 23; Mark Peters – 12; Leon Jorgensen – 7 Jakob Mortensen – 2 Jesper Krueger – 1

Grand Palais Éphémère, Paris

30 August 2024
19:30

Australia	55–53	France
Chris Bond – 27; Ryley Batt – 26; Beau Vernon – 1 Andrew Edmondson – 1	Report	Jonathan Hivernat – 34; Sebastien Verdin – 10; Rodolph Jarlan – 4 Cedric Nankin – 2

Grand Palais Éphémère, Paris

31 August 2024
19:30

France	49–50	Great Britain
Jonathan Hivernat – 27; Sebastien Verdin – 8 Rodolphe Jarlan – 5 Jordan Ducret – 1	Report	Aaron Phipps – 21; Stuart Robinson – 15; Jack Smith – 3 Jamie Stead – 3

Grand Palais Éphémère, Paris

5th to 8th semifinals

1 September 2024
17:30

France	54–48	Germany
Sebastien Verdin – 20; Jonathan Hivernat – 20; Jordan Ducret – 1 Matthieu Thiriet – 1 Brice Maurel – 1	Report	Josco Wilke – 17; Michael Volter – 8 Steffen Wecke – 7 Marco Herbst – 7 Mascha Mosel – 2 Moritz Brueckner – 2 Florian Bongard – 2 Jens Sauerbier – 1

Grand Palais Éphémère, Paris

Fifth place final

2 September 2024
17:30

Canada	50–53	France
Zachary Madell – 35; Cody Caldwell – 3 Trevor Hirschfield – 3 Anthony Letourneau – 1 Patrice Dagenais – 1 Mike Whitehead – 1	Report	Jonathan Hivernat – 25; Sebastien Verdin – 21; Corentin Guen – 1

Grand Palais Éphémère, Paris

== Wheelchair tennis ==
Frédéric Cattanéo, Ksénia Chasteau, Pauline Déroulède, Stéphane Houdet, Guilhem Laget, Gaëtan Menguy and Emmanuelle Mörch have all qualified to compete.

Athlete	Event	Round of 64	Round of 32	Round of 16	Quarterfinals	Semifinals	Final / BM	
Athlete	Event	Opposition Score	Opposition Score	Opposition Score	Opposition Score	Opposition Score	Opposition Score	Rank
Frédéric Cattanéo	Men's singles	ter Hofte (NED); W 6–4, 6–2	Fernández (ARG); L 1–6, 4–6	Did not advance				
Stéphane Houdet	Men's singles	Bye	Ward (GBR); W 6–2, 6–1	Sanada (JPN); W 6–2, 7–5	de la Puente (ESP); L 2–6, 6–4, 1–6	Did not advance		
Guilhem Laget	Men's singles	Bartram (GBR); L 4–6, 4–6	Did not advance					
Gaëtan Menguy	Men's singles	Borhan (MAS); W 6–1, 6–2	Gérard (BEL); W 3–6, 6–3, 7–6^{(7–4)}	Spaargaren (NED); L 4–6, 1–6	Did not advance			
Frédéric Cattanéo; Stéphane Houdet	Men's doubles	—N/a	Bye	Berdichevsky / Lysov (ISR); W 6–2, 6–1	Carneiro / Rodrigues (BRA); W 6–3, 6–0	Hewett / Reid (GBR); L 4–6, 3–6	Bronze medal match Caverzaschi / de la Puente (ESP); L 6–4, 4–6, [5–10]	4
Guilhem Laget; Gaëtan Menguy	Men's doubles	—N/a	Dong / Ji (CHN); L 3–6, 2–6	Did not advance				
Ksénia Chasteau	Women's singles	—N/a	Benichi (MAR); W 6–0, 6–1	Kamiji (JPN); L 6–7^{(4–7)}, 0–6	Did not advance			
Pauline Déroulède	Women's singles	—N/a	Bernal (COL); L 3–6, 1–6	Did not advance				
Charlotte Fairbank	Women's singles	—N/a	Shuker (GBR); L 4–6, 5–7	Did not advance				
Emmanuelle Mörch	Women's singles	—N/a	Ohtani (JPN); L 0–6, 0–6	Did not advance				
Ksénia Chasteau; Pauline Déroulède	Women's doubles	—N/a		Bernal / Rodríguez (COL); L 2–6, 6–4, [9–11]	Did not advance			
Charlotte Fairbank; Emmanuelle Mörch	Women's doubles	—N/a		Montjane / Venter (RSA); L 6–4, 1–6, [4–10]	Did not advance			

== See also ==
- France at the 2024 Summer Olympics
- France at the Paralympics
