= Cycling at the 2024 Summer Paralympics – Women's road time trial C5 =

Women's road time trial C5 at the XVII Paralympic Games
- Venue: Clichy-sous-Bois
- Dates: 4 September
- Competitors: 8 from 6 nations
- Winning time: 20:22.15

Medalists
1st place, gold medalist(s)		Sarah Storey	Great Britain
2nd place, silver medalist(s)		Heidi Gaugain	France
3rd place, bronze medalist(s)		Alana Forster	Australia

The Women's time trial C5 road cycling event at the 2024 Summer Paralympics took place on 4 September 2024 at Clichy-sous-Bois, Paris. Eight riders competed in the event.

The C5 classification is for cyclists described as follows:

C5: mild monoplegic spasticity; unilateral arm amputation (above or below elbow), etc.

== Results ==
Rank	Rider	Nationality	Result	Deficit	Notes
1st place, gold medalist(s)	Sarah Storey	Great Britain	20:22.15		
2nd place, silver medalist(s)	Heidi Gaugain	France	20:26.84	+00:04.69	
3rd place, bronze medalist(s)	Alana Forster	Australia	21:00.48	+00:38.33	
4	Nicole Murray	New Zealand	21:46.26	+01:24.11	
5	Marie Patouillet	France	21:49.72	+01:27.57	
6	Eleonora Mele	Italy	22:27.90	+02:05.75	
7	Paula Ossa	Colombia	22:48.31	+02:26.16	
8	Claudia Cretti	Italy	23:23.93	+03:01.78	
