= Cycling at the 2024 Summer Paralympics – Women's time trial C4–5 =

Women's time trial C4–5 at the XVII Paralympic Games
- Venue: Vélodrome National, Saint-Quentin-en-Yvelines
- Dates: 29 August 2024
- Competitors: 13 from 10 nations
- Winning time: 35.566

Medalists
1st place, gold medalist(s)		Caroline Groot	Netherlands
2nd place, silver medalist(s)		Marie Patouillet	France
3rd place, bronze medalist(s)		Kate O'Brien	Canada

The women's time trial class C4-5 track cycling event at the 2024 Summer Paralympics took place on 29 August 2024 at the Vélodrome National at Saint-Quentin-en-Yvelines . This combine class (C4-5) under classification C is for cyclists who have impairments that affect their legs, arms, and/or trunk but are still capable to use a standard bicycle. 13 cyclists from 10 nations compete in this event.

The classifications are described as follows:

- C4: mild hemiplegic or diplegic spasticity; mild athetosis or ataxia; unilateral below knee or bilateral below elbow amputation, etc.
- C5: mild monoplegic spasticity; unilateral arm amputation (above or below elbow), etc.

== Records ==
Women's C4 500m Time Trial
World Record	34.812	Great Britain	Kadeena Cox	27 August 2021	Tokyo
Paralympic Record	34.812	Great Britain	Kadeena Cox	27 August 2021	Tokyo
Women's C5 500m Time Trial
World Record	35.599	Netherlands	Caroline Groot	27 August 2021	Tokyo
Paralympic Record	35.599	Netherlands	Caroline Groot	27 August 2021	Tokyo

== Competition format ==
The competition begins with a qualification round, where the 13 cyclists will compete in pairs against the clock. The fastest six cyclists will qualify to compete for gold, silver and bronze in the final that afternoon, setting off in reverse order sixth fastest, then fifth fastest, etc.. The distance of this event is 500m.

A cyclist may have a different 'result time' than their real-time due to this event being a combined class event (C4-5), and some cyclists in their own class may have a disadvantage over other classes (for example due to speed), thus athlete factoring is used.

Despite this, different classifications have their own world and paralympic Games records

== Schedule ==
All times are Central European Summer Time (UTC+2)

Date	Time	Round
29 August	12:00	Qualifying
29 August	15:45	Final

== Background ==
Double Paralympic Games champion, World record holder and three-time World champion in the C4 event, Kadeena Cox returns to attempt to complete a hat-trick of time trial championships at the age of 33. She arrives off the back of a difficult year that included a series of injuries and a relapse in her Multiple sclerosis condition, but also as the reigning world champion in her C4 category, and with no 'divided loyalties' as Cox was not selected for the athletics squad on this occasion. Her nearest current rival, the Dutch C5 World champion Caroline Groot, now 27, also makes the start line, as does multiple world and Paralympic C5 medalist Nicole Murray of New Zealand. The time gap between Cox and Groot in the 2024 World championships - approximately 3 tenths of a second - means that factoring may have a crucial role to play in the final results.

== Results ==
=== Qualifying ===
The C4–5 500 m time trial is a multi-classification event. To ensure fairness, factoring is applied to the times of each cyclist based on their classification, and it is this factored time represents their result, both in qualification and, if that cyclist qualifies, the final. In a women's C4-5 track event, the factor for a C4 rider is 98.67 and for a C5 is 100.00. The result of the cyclist is calculated as a percentage of the elapsed time, with the factor providing the relevant percentage.

The six fastest times after factoring qualify for the final.

Rank	Heat	Cyclist	Nation	Class	Real Time	Factor	Result	Notes
1	6	Caroline Groot	Netherlands	C5	35.390 WR	100.00	35.390	Q
2	7	Kadeena Cox	Great Britain	C4	35.914	98.67	35.436	Q
3	6	Marie Patouillet	France	C5	36.677	100.00	36.677	Q
4	2	Kate O'Brien	Canada	C4	37.493	98.67	36.994	Q
5	5	Li Xiaohui	China	C4	37.505	98.67	37.006	Q
6	7	Nicole Murray	New Zealand	C5	37.367	100.00	37.367	Q
7	4	Claudia Cretti	Italy	C5	38.929	100.00	38.929	
8	5	Mariela Delgado	Argentina	C5	39.107	100.00	39.107	
9	2	Franziska Matile-Dörig	Switzerland	C4	39.945	98.67	39.414	
10	3	Keely Shaw	Canada	C4	40.431	98.67	39.893	
11	4	Heïdi Gaugain	France	C5	39.963	100.00	39.963	
12	3	Samantha Bosco	United States	C4	40.558	98.67	40.048	
13	1	Shawn Morelli	United States	C4	42.618	98.67	42.051	

=== Final ===
Rank	Cyclist	Nation	Class	Real Time	Factor	Result	Notes
1st place, gold medalist(s)	Caroline Groot	Netherlands	C5	35.566	100.00	35.566	
2nd place, silver medalist(s)	Marie Patouillet	France	C5	36.700	100.00	36.700	
3rd place, bronze medalist(s)	Kate O'Brien	Canada	C4	37.037	98.67	36.873	
4	Li Xiaohui	China	C4	37.688	98.67	37.187	
5	Nicole Murray	New Zealand	C5	37.425	100.00	37.425	
6	Kadeena Cox	Great Britain	C4	DNF	98.67	DNF	
