= Wheelchair fencing at the 2024 Summer Paralympics – Women's épée B =

Wheelchair fencing event at the 2024 Summer Paralympics

Women's épée B at the XVII Paralympic Games
- Venue: Grand Palais
- Date: 6 September 2024
- Competitors: 15 from 11 nations

Medalists
1st place, gold medalist(s)		Saysunee Jana	Thailand
2nd place, silver medalist(s)		Kang Su	China
3rd place, bronze medalist(s)		Olena Fedota	Ukraine

The women's épée category B event at the 2024 Summer Paralympics was held on 6 September 2024 at the Grand Palais in Paris, France.

Saysunee Jana of Thailand won the gold medal, defeating Kang Su of China 15–7 in the final. Olena Fedota of Ukraine won the bronze medal after defeating Nga Ting Tong of Hong Kong 15–6 in the bronze medal bout. The victory completed Saysunee's sweep of the women's sabre, foil and épée category B events at the Games.

== Format ==
The competition was held as a direct elimination tournament with repechage. Bouts were fenced to 15 hits or a maximum of three periods of three minutes.

== Schedule ==
All times are Central European Summer Time (UTC+2)

Date	Time	Round
6 September 2024	10:10	Round of 16
6 September 2024	12:10	Quarterfinals / Repechage round 1
6 September 2024	13:40	Repechage round 2
6 September 2024	14:40	Semifinals / Repechage round 3
6 September 2024	15:50	Repechage round 4
6 September 2024	18:30	Bronze medal bout
6 September 2024	20:15	Gold medal bout

== Seeds ==
Athletes were seeded into the direct elimination bracket based on the World Para Fencing ranking prior to the Games.

1. Saysunee Jana (THA)
2. Rossana Pasquino (ITA)
3. Cho Eun-hye (KOR)
4. Anri Sakurai (JPN)
5. Nga Ting Tong (HKG)
6. Ellen Geddes (USA)
7. Cécile Demaude (FRA)
8. Olena Fedota (UKR)
9. Trinity Lowthian (CAN)
10. Kang Su (CHN)
11. Ao Lanzhu (CHN)
12. Jadwiga Pacek (POL)
13. Chung Yuen-ping (HKG)
14. Monica Santos (BRA)
15. Francia Jaimez Rojas (VEN)

== Results ==
=== Bracket ===
Round of 16
Olena Fedota (UKR)	15
Trinity Lowthian (CAN)	9
Nga Ting Tong (HKG)	15
Jadwiga Pacek (POL)	8
Anri Sakurai (JPN)	15
Chung Yuen-ping (HKG)	3
Cho Eun-hye (KOR)	15
Monica Santos (BRA)	1
Ao Lanzhu (CHN)	15
Ellen Geddes (USA)	2
Kang Su (CHN)	15
Cécile Demaude (FRA)	8
Rossana Pasquino (ITA)	15
Francia Jaimez Rojas (VEN)	2

Quarterfinals
Saysunee Jana (THA)	15
Olena Fedota (UKR)	6
Nga Ting Tong (HKG)	15
Anri Sakurai (JPN)	12
Cho Eun-hye (KOR)	10
Ao Lanzhu (CHN)	15
Kang Su (CHN)	15
Rossana Pasquino (ITA)	13

Semifinals
Saysunee Jana (THA)	15
Nga Ting Tong (HKG)	7
Ao Lanzhu (CHN)	14
Kang Su (CHN)	15

Gold medal bout
Saysunee Jana (THA)	15
Kang Su (CHN)	7

=== Bronze medal bout ===
Repechage round 4
Nga Ting Tong (HKG)	15
Trinity Lowthian (CAN)	14
Olena Fedota (UKR)	15
Ao Lanzhu (CHN)	13

Bronze medal bout
Nga Ting Tong (HKG)	6
Olena Fedota (UKR)	15

=== Repechage ===
Repechage round 1
Jadwiga Pacek (POL)	15
Chung Yuen-ping (HKG)	12

Repechage round 2
Trinity Lowthian (CAN)	15
Cho Eun-hye (KOR)	7
Rossana Pasquino (ITA)	15
Jadwiga Pacek (POL)	9

Repechage round 3
Trinity Lowthian (CAN)	15
Rossana Pasquino (ITA)	13

Repechage round 1
Ellen Geddes (USA)	15
Monica Santos (BRA)	14
Cécile Demaude (FRA)	15
Francia Jaimez Rojas (VEN)	0

Repechage round 2
Ellen Geddes (USA)	4
Olena Fedota (UKR)	15
Anri Sakurai (JPN)	15
Cécile Demaude (FRA)	13

Repechage round 3
Olena Fedota (UKR)	15
Anri Sakurai (JPN)	7
