= Wheelchair fencing at the 2024 Summer Paralympics – Women's sabre B =

Wheelchair fencing event at the 2024 Summer Paralympics

Women's sabre B at the XVII Paralympic Games
- Venue: Grand Palais
- Date: 3 September 2024
- Competitors: 15 from 10 nations

Medalists
1st place, gold medalist(s)		Saysunee Jana	Thailand
2nd place, silver medalist(s)		Xiao Rong	China
3rd place, bronze medalist(s)		Olena Fedota	Ukraine

The women's sabre category B event at the 2024 Summer Paralympics was held on 3 September 2024 at the Grand Palais in Paris, France.

Saysunee Jana of Thailand won the gold medal, defeating Xiao Rong of China 15–14 in the final; it was her third Paralympic gold medal and seventh Paralympic medal overall. Olena Fedota of Ukraine won the bronze medal after defeating Ao Lanzhu of China 15–3 in the bronze medal bout.

== Format ==
The competition was held as a direct elimination tournament with repechage. Bouts were fenced to 15 hits or a maximum of three periods of three minutes.

== Schedule ==
All times are Central European Summer Time (UTC+2)

Date	Time	Round
3 September 2024	13:40	Round of 16
3 September 2024	15:00	Quarterfinals / Repechage round 1
3 September 2024	16:00	Repechage round 2
3 September 2024	16:40	Semifinals / Repechage round 3
3 September 2024	17:40	Final repechage
3 September 2024	20:00	Bronze medal bout
3 September 2024	21:15	Gold medal bout

== Seeds ==
Athletes were seeded into the direct elimination bracket based on the World Para Fencing ranking prior to the Games.

1. Rossana Pasquino (ITA)
2. Irma Khetsuriani (GEO)
3. Xiao Rong (CHN)
4. Saysunee Jana (THA)
5. Cho Eun-hye (KOR)
6. Boglárka Mező (HUN)
7. Nga Ting Tong (HKG)
8. Nadiia Doloh (UKR)
9. Olena Fedota (UKR)
10. Jadwiga Pacek (POL)
11. Ao Lanzhu (CHN)
12. Trinity Lowthian (CAN)
13. Monica Santos (BRA)
14. Cécile Demaude (FRA)
15. Francia Jaimez Rojas (VEN)

== Results ==
=== Main bracket ===
Round of 16
Nadiia Doloh (UKR)	1
Olena Fedota (UKR)	15
Cho Eun-hye (KOR)	15
Trinity Lowthian (CAN)	8
Saysunee Jana (THA)	15
Monica Santos (BRA)	2
Cécile Demaude (FRA)	3
Xiao Rong (CHN)	15
Boglárka Mező (HUN)	15
Ao Lanzhu (CHN)	5
Jadwiga Pacek (POL)	15
Nga Ting Tong (HKG)	12
Irma Khetsuriani (GEO)	15
Francia Jaimez Rojas (VEN)	2

Quarterfinals
Olena Fedota (UKR)	15
Rossana Pasquino (ITA)	8
Cho Eun-hye (KOR)	3
Saysunee Jana (THA)	15
Xiao Rong (CHN)	15
Boglárka Mező (HUN)	4
Jadwiga Pacek (POL)	9
Irma Khetsuriani (GEO)	15

Semifinals
Olena Fedota (UKR)	9
Saysunee Jana (THA)	15
Xiao Rong (CHN)	15
Irma Khetsuriani (GEO)	5

Gold medal bout
Saysunee Jana (THA)	15
Xiao Rong (CHN)	14

=== Bronze medal bout ===
Repechage round 4
Olena Fedota (UKR)	15
Boglárka Mező (HUN)	12
Ao Lanzhu (CHN)	15
Irma Khetsuriani (GEO)	8

Bronze medal bout
Olena Fedota (UKR)	15
Ao Lanzhu (CHN)	3

=== Repechage ===
Repechage round 1
Trinity Lowthian (CAN)	14
Monica Santos (BRA)	15

Repechage round 2
Boglárka Mező (HUN)	15
Nadiia Doloh (UKR)	6
Jadwiga Pacek (POL)	15
Monica Santos (BRA)	7

Repechage round 3
Boglárka Mező (HUN)	15
Jadwiga Pacek (POL)	6

Repechage round 1
Cécile Demaude (FRA)	2
Ao Lanzhu (CHN)	15
Francia Jaimez Rojas (VEN)	6
Nga Ting Tong (HKG)	15

Repechage round 2
Rossana Pasquino (ITA)	14
Ao Lanzhu (CHN)	15
Cho Eun-hye (KOR)	15
Nga Ting Tong (HKG)	5

Repechage round 3
Ao Lanzhu (CHN)	15
Cho Eun-hye (KOR)	6
