= Cycling at the 2024 Summer Paralympics – Women's road race C4–5 =

Women's road race C4-5 at the XVII Paralympic Games
- Dates: 6 September 2024
- Competitors: 16 from 11 nations
- Winning time: 1:54:24

Medalists
1st place, gold medalist(s)		Sarah Storey	Great Britain
2nd place, silver medalist(s)		Heïdi Gaugain	France
3rd place, bronze medalist(s)		Paula Ossa	Colombia

The women's road race C4-5 cycling event at the 2024 Summer Paralympics took place on 6 September 2024. 16 riders competed in the event.

The event is for C4 and C5 athletes, described as follows:

- C4: mild hemiplegic or diplegic spasticity; mild athetosis or ataxia; unilateral below knee or bilateral below elbow amputation, etc.
- C5: mild monoplegic spasticity; unilateral arm amputation (above or below elbow), etc.

== Schedule ==
F	Finals

Women's Road Race
Event↓/Date →	5 September	6 September	7 September
B		F	
H1-4	F		
H5	F		
C1-3			F
C4-5		F	
T1-2			F

== Results ==
The event took place on 6 September 2024 at 9:48.

Rank	Rider	Nationality	Class	Time	Gap	Notes
1st place, gold medalist(s)	Sarah Storey	Great Britain	(C5)	1:54:24		
2nd place, silver medalist(s)	Heïdi Gaugain	France	(C5)	1:54:24	+0	
3rd place, bronze medalist(s)	Paula Ossa	Colombia	(C5)	1:54:44	+20	
4	Samantha Bosco	United States	(C4)	1:57:03	+2:39	
5	Marie Patouillet	France	(C5)	2:0:46	+6:22	
6	Franziska Matile-Doerig	Switzerland	(C4)	2:00:46	+6:22	
7	Alana Forster	Australia	(C5)	2:0:49	+6:25	
8	Eleonora Mele	Italy	(C5)	2:00:49	+6:25	
9	Xiaohui Li	China	(C4)	2:01:21	+6:57	
10	Claudia Cretti	Italy	(C5)	2:01:21	+6:57	
11	Emily Petricola	Australia	(C4)	2:01:23	+6:59	
12	Meg Lemon	Australia	(C4)	2:07:48	+13:24	
13	Mariela Analia Delgado	Argentina	(C5)	2:09:13	+14:49	
14	Shawn Morelli	United States	(C4)	2:09:20	+14:56	
15	Keely Shaw	Canada	(C4)	2:0928	+15:04	
	Nicole Murray	New Zealand	(C5)	DNS		

s.t. Same time
