= Cycling at the 2024 Summer Paralympics – Women's pursuit C5 =

Women's individual pursuit C5 at the XVII Paralympic Games
- Venue: Vélodrome National
- Dates: 1 September 2024
- Competitors: 8 from 7 nations
- Winning time: 3:35.691

Medalists
1st place, gold medalist(s)		Marie Patouillet	France
2nd place, silver medalist(s)		Heïdi Gaugain	France
3rd place, bronze medalist(s)		Nicole Murray	New Zealand

The women's individual pursuit class C5 track cycling event at the 2024 Summer Paralympics took place on 1 September 2024 at the Vélodrome National.

== Competition format ==
The C category is for cyclists with a physical impairment (muscle power or range of motion, and impairments affecting the coordination) that prevents them from competing in able-bodied competition but still competes using a standard bicycle.

The competition starts with a qualifying round where it comprises a head-to-head race between the 8 cyclists; The 2 fastest cyclists in the qualifying would qualify to the gold medal final while the 3rd and 4th fastest will qualify to the bronze medal final where they will race head-to-head. The distance of this event is 3000 metres. The medal finals are also held on the same day as the qualifying.

== Schedule ==
All times are Central European Summer Time (UTC+2)

Date	Time	Round
1 September	12:24	Qualifying
1 September	15:14	Finals

== Results ==
=== Qualifying ===
Rank	Heat	Cyclist	Nation	Result	Notes
1	4	Heïdi Gaugain	France	3:33.881	QG
2	3	Marie Patouillet	France	3:35.285	QG
3	3	Nicole Murray	New Zealand	3:37.599	QB
4	4	Claudia Cretti	Italy	3:38.869	QB
5	2	Alana Forster	Australia	3:41.497	
6	2	Paula Ossa	Colombia	3:49.837	
7	1	Mariela Delgado	Argentina	4:02.298	
8	1	Caroline Groot	Netherlands	4:05.470	

=== Finals ===
Rank	Cyclist	Nation	Result	Notes
Gold medal final
1st place, gold medalist(s)	Marie Patouillet	France	3:35.691	
2nd place, silver medalist(s)	Heidi Gaugain	France	3:37.723	
Bronze medal final
3rd place, bronze medalist(s)	Nicole Murray	New Zealand	3:36.206	
4	Claudia Cretti	Italy	3:43.774	
