= Léane Morceau =

French Paralympic swimmer

Personal information
- Born: 30 July 2003 (age 22) Poitiers, France

Sport
- Sport: Paralympic swimming
- Disability: Leber's optic neuropathy
- Disability class: S12
Medal record
Representing France
European Championships
Bronze medal – third place	2024 Funchal	100m backstroke S12

Léane Morceau (born 30 July 2003) is a French Paralympic swimmer who competes in international swimming competitions. She is a European bronze medalist and has competed at the 2024 Summer Paralympics but did not medal.
