= Sylvie Morel =

Canadian wheelchair fencer

Personal information
- Born: Ruth Sylvie Morel; September 2, 1956 (age 70)
- Home town: Pincourt, Quebec, Canada

Sport
- Sport: Wheelchair fencing
- Disability class: A

Ruth Sylvie Morel (born September 2, 1956) is a Canadian Paralympic wheelchair fencer.

== Career ==
At the Sydney 2000 Paralympic Games, Morel was the first Canadian to compete in Paralympic-level wheelchair fencing. She placed 10th in épée and 11th in foil. She qualified for the 2004 Summer Paralympics but was not selected by Canada to compete.

At the 2011 International Wheelchair and Amputee Sports Federation (IWAS) Wheelchair Fencing Americas Championships, Morel won gold in women's A épée, which qualified her for the 2012 Summer Paralympics. At the 2012 Paralympic games, she placed 12th in épée.

Morel won gold in women's A épée and silver in women's A foil at the 2015 IWAS Wheelchair Fencing Americas Championships. She missed out on qualifying for the 2016 Summer Paralympics by four points. At the 2018 North American Cup in Milwaukee, Morel won gold in women's sabre and bronze in women's foil.

Morel was the oldest Canadian Paralympian to compete at the 2020 Paralympic Games. She placed 14th in sabre, her Paralympic sabre debut, and 15th in foil.

At the 2022 IWAS Wheelchair Fencing Americas Championships, Morel won gold in the women's sabre category A. At the 2023 IWAS Pan Am championships, Morel, on a team with Amber Briar and Trinity Lowthian, won bronze in the women's épée team event. At the 2024 IWAS Wheelchair Fencing Americas Championships, Briar, Lowthian, and Morel again won bronze in the women's épée team event.

Going into the 2024 Summer Paralympics, Morel was ranked 21st in the women's category A sabre. She has said the 2024 Paralympics will be her last.

== Personal life ==
After a car accident in 1993, Morel had her right leg amputated below the knee.
