= Clémence Delavoipière =

French wheelchair fencer

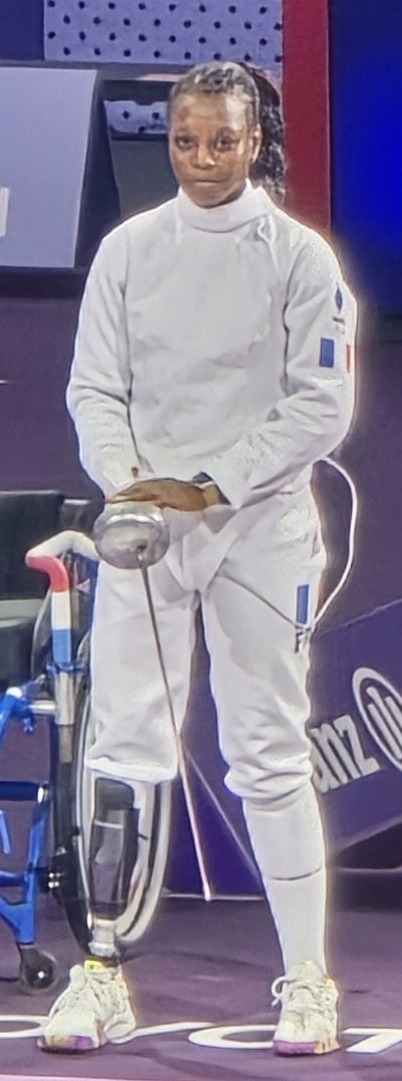
- Delavoipière at 2024 Summer Paralympics

Personal information
- Born: 5 January 2000 (age 26) Les Andelys, France

Sport
- Sport: Wheelchair fencing
- Club: Levallois Sporting Club, Ile-de-France
Medal record
Representing France
World Championships
Gold medal – first place	2022 Sao Paulo	Individual épée A
Silver medal – second place	2022 Sao Paulo	Individual sabre A
Bronze medal – third place	2022 Sao Paulo	Individual foil A
European Championships
Silver medal – second place	2024 Paris	Team épée

Clémence Delavopière (born 5 January 2000) is a French wheelchair fencer who competes in international fencing competitions. She is a World champion and European silver medalist in épée. She competed at the 2024 Summer Paralympics where she did not medal.

A sports centre in Bournville-Sainte-Croix, Eure commune is named after Delavoipière in honour of fencing achievements.
