= Trinity Lowthian =

Canadian wheelchair fencer

Personal information
- Born: January 29, 2002 (age 24)
- Home town: Ottawa, Ontario, Canada
- Website: trinitylowthian.ca

Sport
- Sport: Wheelchair fencing
- Disability class: B
- University team: University of Ottawa

Trinity Lowthian (born January 29, 2002) is a Canadian wheelchair fencer. She placed fifth in women's épée B, Canada's best Paralympic result in the sport.

== Early life and education ==
Lowthian attended South Carleton High School. While in grade ten and eleven, Lowthian became sick and spent time at the Children's Hospital of Eastern Ontario. In 2018, she was diagnosed with autoimmune autonomic neuropathy. Prior to her illness, Lowthian competed in biathlon, triathlon, cross-country and water polo.

She completed a bachelor's degree in nutrition and food science at the University of Ottawa in 2025 and then pursued a master's degree in human kinetics. She was selected as a 2026 Rhodes Scholar and plans to pursue doctoral studies at the University of Oxford. Lowthian is a lesbian.

== Fencing ==
Lowthian began wheelchair fencing in May 2022 with the Ottawa Fencing Club. She has no function in her lower body and competes in the B class.

At the 2022 Pan American Championships in Brazil, she won three bronze medals and one silver. In September 2023, she was ranked number one in U23 wheelchair épée fencing in the B category, after placing sixth in U23 women's B épée at the 2022 World Cup and winning bronze in the U23 combined A and B class épée at the 2023 World Cup in Busan. At the 2023 IWAS Pan Am championships, Lowthian, with Sylvie Morel and Amber Briar, won bronze in the women’s épée team event. At the 2024 IWAS Wheelchair Fencing Americas Championships, Morel, Briar, and Lowthian, again won bronze in the women’s épée team event.

At the 2024 Americas Cup, Lowthian won gold in women's B Sabre and épée and a bronze medal in foil. She competed for Canada in wheelchair fencing at the 2024 Summer Paralympics, and placed fifth in women's épée B and thirteenth in women's sabre B. She was one win away from the bronze medal match in épée, losing her fourth round repechage 14 to 15, which was Canada's best wheelchair fencing result at a Paralympics.

Lowthian has been recognized with the King Charles III Coronation Medal and the Ontario Premier’s Medal of Excellence.
