= Gaëlle Edon =

French Paralympic shooter

Personal information
- Born: 29 November 1988 (age 37) Annecy, France

Sport
- Sport: Paralympic shooting
Medal record
Representing France
World Championships
Silver medal – second place	2023 Lima	10m pistol P2
European Championships
Gold medal – first place	2022 Hamar	10m pistol P5
Bronze medal – third place	2024 Granada	10m pistol P2

Gaëlle Edon (born 29 November 1988) is a French Paralympic shooter who competes in international sport shooting competitions. She is a European champion and World silver medalist in pistol shooting. She competed at the 2024 Summer Paralympics but did not medal.

== Life-changing accident ==
In December 2012, Edon, a keen mountaineer and skier, was involved in a chairlift accident when a part of the roof collapsed. She had a brain haemorrhage which left her with hemiplegia on her left side affecting her arm and leg.
