= Morgen Caillaud =

French paralympic table tennis player

Personal information
- Born: 29 January 2002 (age 24) Tours, Indre-et-Loire, France

Sport
- Sport: Para table tennis
- Disability class: C6
Medal record
Representing France
World Championships
Bronze medal – third place	2022 Granada	Doubles C14
European Championships
Bronze medal – third place	2023 Sheffield	Mixed doubles C14
Bronze medal – third place	2023 Sheffield	Doubles C14

Morgen Caillaud (born 29 January 2002) is a French para table tennis player who competes in international table tennis competitions. She is a World and European bronze medalist, she competed at the 2024 Summer Paralympics.
