= Olena Fedota =

Ukrainian wheelchair fencer

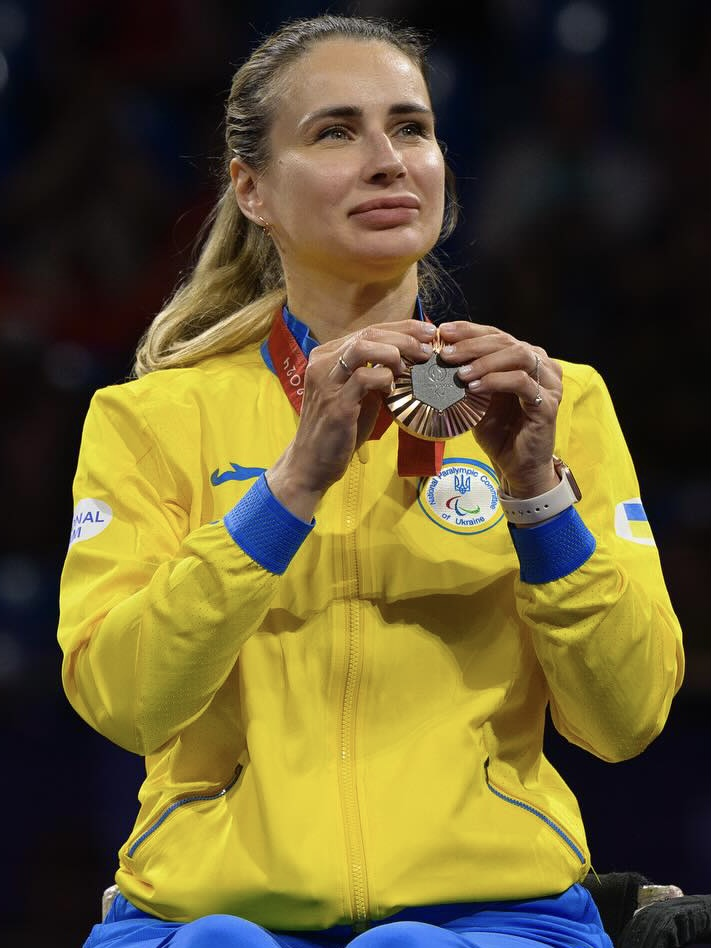
- Fedota at the 2024 Summer Paralympics

Personal information
- Full name: Olena Fedota-Isaieva
- Born: 23 August 1986 (age 39) Kharkiv, Ukraine

Sport
- Country: Ukraine
- Sport: Wheelchair fencing
Medal record
Paralympic Games
Silver medal – second place	2020 Tokyo	Sabre B
Silver medal – second place	2024 Paris	Team épée
Bronze medal – third place	2024 Paris	Épée B
Bronze medal – third place	2024 Paris	Sabre B

Olena Fedota-Isaieva (born 23 August 1986) is a Ukrainian épée and sabre wheelchair fencer. She is a Paralympian who won a silver medal at the 2020 games and two bronze medals at the 2024 games.

== Career ==
She previously competed in swimming at the 2012 Summer Paralympics held in London, United Kingdom and at the 2016 Summer Paralympics held in Rio de Janeiro, Brazil.

She won the silver medal in the women's sabre B event at the 2020 Summer Paralympics held in Tokyo, Japan and the bronze medal in the sabre B event at the 2024 Summer Paralympics in Paris, France.
