= Brianna Vidé =

French wheelchair fencer

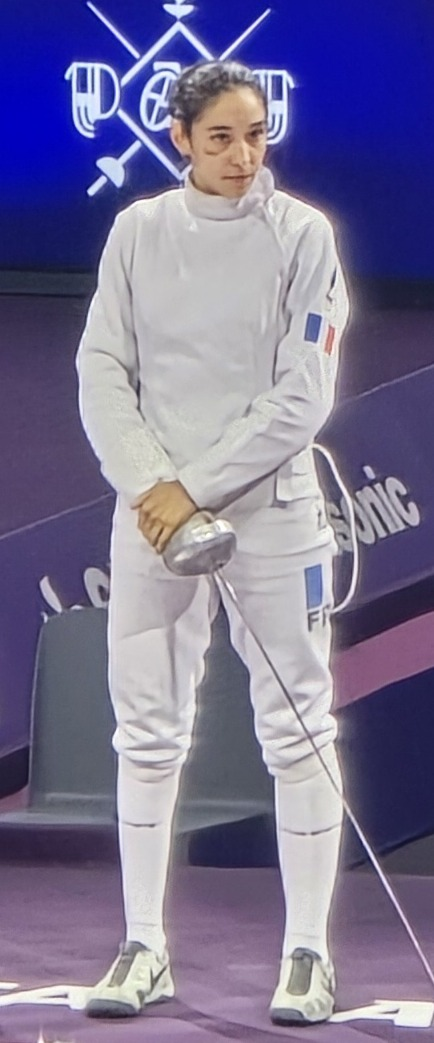
- Vidé at 2024 Summer Paralympics

Personal information
- Born: 28 September 1999 (age 26) Toulouse, France

Sport
- Sport: Wheelchair fencing
- Disability: Clubfoot
- Club: Muret Fencing Club
Medal record
Representing France
World U23 Championships
Bronze medal – third place	2019 Sao Paulo	Individual sabre A
World U17 Championships
Silver medal – second place	2017 Warsaw	Individual sabre A
European Championships
Silver medal – second place	2024 Paris	Team épée

Brianne Vidé (born 28 September 1999) is a French wheelchair fencer who competes in international fencing competitions. She is a World and European silver medalist and a 10-time national title holder in individual events. She has competed at the 2024 Summer Paralympics but did not medal.

Vidé and her twin sister and brothers are all fencers and study classical dance.
