= Alana Forster =

Australian Paralympic cyclist

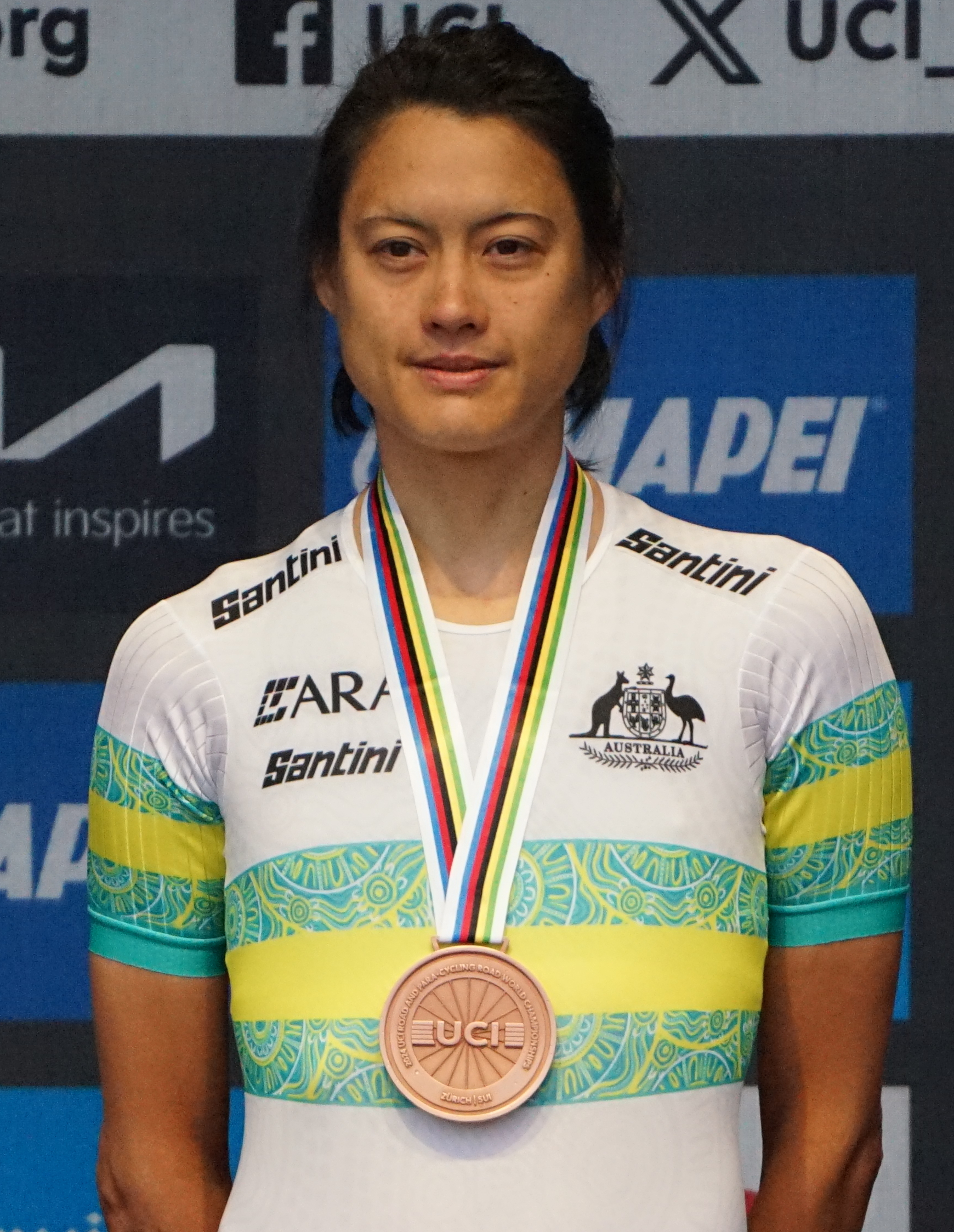
- Forster winning bronze at the 2024 World Championships

Personal information
- Nationality: Australian
- Born: 4 May 1986 (age 40)

Sport
- Country: Australia
- Sport: Cycling
- Disability class: C5
- Club: Ballarat Sebastopol Cycling Club
Medal record
Cycling
Paralympic Games
Bronze medal – third place	2024 Paris	Road time trial C5
Track World Championships
Gold medal – first place	2023 Glasgow	Scratch race C5
Road World Championships
Gold medal – first place	2025 Ronse	Time trial C5
Gold medal – first place	2025 Ronse	Road race C5
Silver medal – second place	2023 Glasgow	Time trial C5
Silver medal – second place	2026 Huntsville	Time trial C5
Bronze medal – third place	2024 Zurich	Road race C5
Bronze medal – third place	2026 Huntsville	Road race C5

Alana Forster (born 4 May 1986) is an Australian Paralympic cyclist. She won a gold medal and a silver medal at the 2023 UCI World Championships in Glasgow. Forster won a bronze medal at the 2024 Summer Paralympics.

== Personal life ==
Forster suffered injuries as a result of a car accident where her car was t-boned. Forster was airlifted to The Alfred Hospital in Melbourne and spent a week in intensive care. She suffered injuries to her pelvis, femur, ulna, patella and ribs. She spent three months in rehabilitation. Prior to the car accident, Forster worked as an emergency department doctor.

== Cycling ==
Prior to her car accident, Forster had a successful road cycling career including racing in Europe and the Dubai Women's Tour, and earned top-10 results in Oceania and national time trial championships. Forster is classified as a C5 cyclist.

At the Australian Road Cycling Championships, she won the gold medal in the Women's Road Race WC4 and bronze medal in the Women's Time Trial WC4. At the 2023 Oceania Track Championships, she defeated Meg Lemon in Women's Individual Pursuit C5 and finished third in the Women's Omnium C5.

Forster won the gold medal in the Women's Scratch race C5 at the 2023 UCI Para-cycling Track World Championships in Glasgow after making a successful attack with five laps to go.

At the 2024 UCI Para-cycling Track World Championships in Rio de Janeiro, Foster finished fifth in the Women's Scratch Race C5 and sixth in the Women's Individual Pursuit C5. At the 2024 Paris Paralympics, she won the bronze in the Women's C5 Individual Time Trial, finished fifth in the Women's Individual pursuit C5 and seventh in the Women's road race C4-5. At the 2025 UCI Para-cycling Road World Championships in Ronse, she won gold medals in Women's Time Trial C5 and Women's Road Race C5.

She is a member of the Ballarat Sebastopol Cycling Club.

== Recognition ==
- 2025 - Victorian Institute of Sport Para Athlete of the Year.
