= Anne-Sophie Centis =

French Paralympic cyclist

Personal information
- Born: 24 September 1983 (age 42) Lille, France

Sport
- Sport: Paralympic cycling
- Disability: Glaucoma
Medal record
Representing France
Track World Championships
Bronze medal – third place	2022 Saint-Quentin-en-Yvelines	Individual pursuit B
Bronze medal – third place	2022 Saint-Quentin-en-Yvelines	Mixed team sprint
Road World Championships
Bronze medal – third place	2023 Glasgow	Time trial B
Bronze medal – third place	2025 Ronse	Time trial B

Anne-Sophie Centis (born 24 September 1983) is a French Paralympic cyclist who competes at international cycling competitions. She is a two-time World bronze medalist in track cycling, and two-time World bronze medalist in road cycling. She represented France at the 2024 Summer Paralympics.
