= Kang Su =

Chinese wheelchair fencer

Personal information
- Nationality: Chinese
- Born: 15 May 1994 (age 32)
- Home town: Nanjing, China

Sport
- Country: China
- Sport: Wheelchair fencing
Medal record
Women's wheelchair fencing
Representing China
Paralympic Games
Gold medal – first place	2024 Paris	Team épée
Silver medal – second place	2024 Paris	Épée B
Asian Para Games
Gold medal – first place	2022 Hangzhou	Team épée
Silver medal – second place	2022 Hangzhou	Foil B
Bronze medal – third place	2022 Hangzhou	Épée B

Kang Su (born 15 May 1994) is a Chinese wheelchair fencer. She represented China at the 2024 Summer Paralympics.

== Career ==
Kang represented China at the 2024 Summer Paralympics and won a silver medal in the épée B event.
