= Yohan Peter =

French wheelchair fencer born 1988)

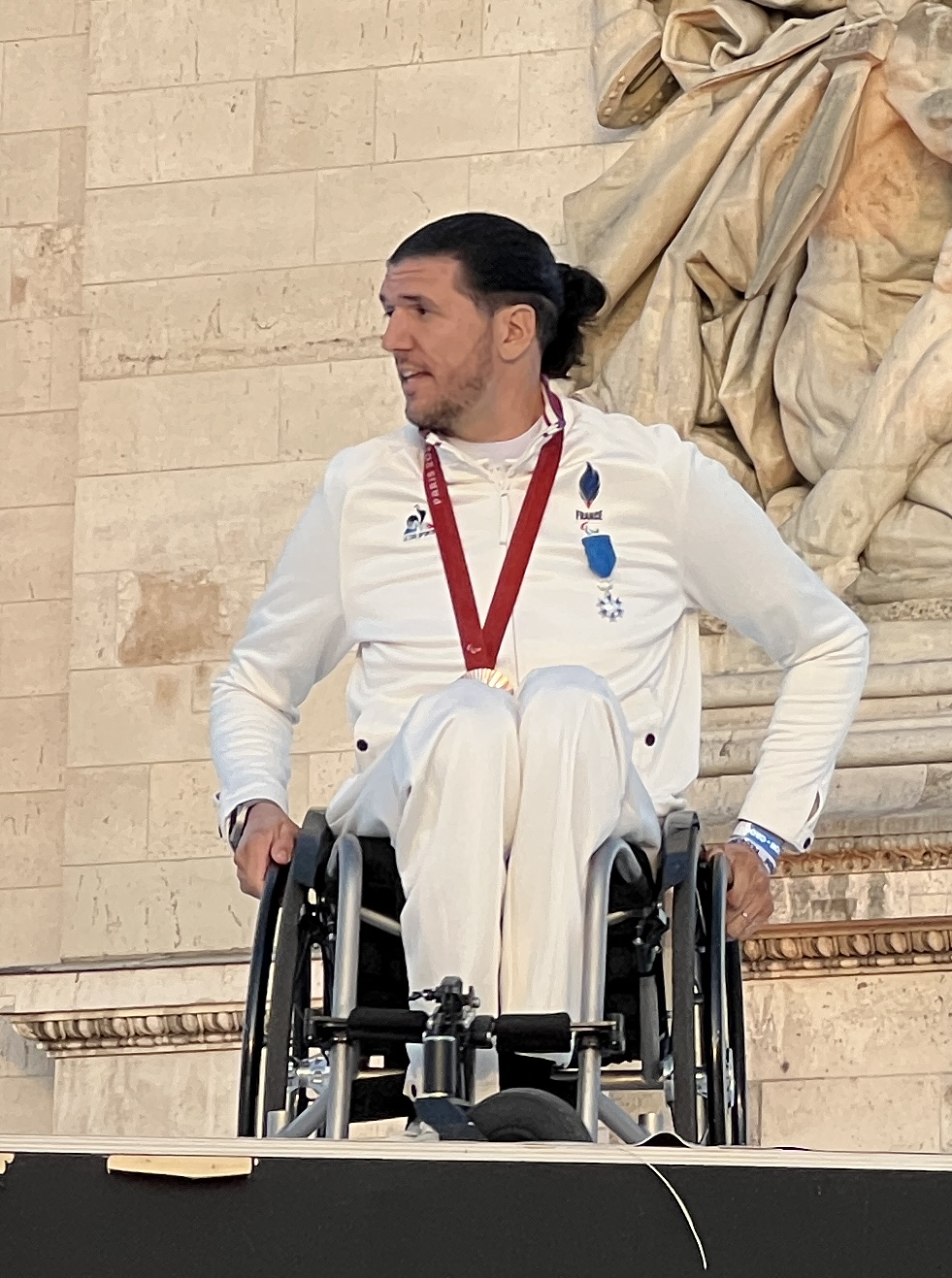

Personal information
- Nationality: French
- Born: 10 August 1988 (age 37) Villeneuve-Saint-Georges, France

Sport
- Sport: Wheelchair fencing
Medal record
Men's wheelchair fencing
Representing France
Paralympic Games
Bronze medal – third place	2024 Paris	Team foil

Yohan Peter (born 10 August 1988) is a French wheelchair fencer.

== Career ==
Peter represented France at the 2024 Summer Paralympics and won a bronze medal in the team foil event.
