= Heïdi Gaugain =

French Paralympic cyclist

Personal information
- Born: 30 November 2004 (age 21) Mayenne, France

Sport
- Sport: Para-cycling
- Disability: Agenesis of left arm
- Disability class: C5
- Club: Bizkaia Durango
Medal record
Representing France
Women's para-cycling
Paralympic Games
Silver medal – second place	2024 Paris	Ind. pursuit C5
Silver medal – second place	2024 Paris	Road time trial C5
Silver medal – second place	2024 Paris	Road race C4–5
World Road Championships
Silver medal – second place	2024 Zurich	Time trial C5
Bronze medal – third place	2023 Glasgow	Time trial C5
World Track Championships
Gold medal – first place	2023 Glasgow	Individual pursuit C5
Gold medal – first place	2024 Rio de Janeiro	Individual pursuit C5
Silver medal – second place	2022 Saint-Quentin-en-Yvelines	Individual pursuit C5
Bronze medal – third place	2022 Saint-Quentin-en-Yvelines	Omnium C5
European Para Championships
Gold medal – first place	2023 Rotterdam	Road time trial C5
Gold medal – first place	2023 Rotterdam	Road race C5
Women's track cycling
World Junior Championships
Gold medal – first place	2022 Tel Aviv	Points race
Gold medal – first place	2022 Tel Aviv	Team pursuit

Heïdi Gaugain (born 30 November 2004) is a French Paralympic cyclist who competes in international cycling competitions. She is a double World track cycling champion and double European champion, she is also a World Junior champion and French U23 champion in able-bodied cycling becoming the first para-cyclist to win World titles in both para and able-bodied cycling. She cycles for Bizkaia Durango. She has qualified to compete at the 2024 Summer Paralympics.
