= Alexandra Saint-Pierre =

French para table tennis player

Personal information
- Born: 18 May 1998 (age 28) Abbeville, France

Sport
- Sport: Para table tennis
Medal record
Representing France
World Championships
Gold medal – first place	2022 Granada	Singles C5
Bronze medal – third place	2022 Granada	Doubles C10
European Championships
Silver medal – second place	2023 Sheffield	Singles C4-5
Bronze medal – third place	2023 Sheffield	Doubles C5-10

Alexandra Saint-Pierre (born 18 May 1998) is a French para table tennis player who competes at international table tennis competitions. She is a World champion and has won World and European bronze medals in doubles with Flora Vautier.
