= Julie Marano =

French triathlete (born 1996)

Personal information
- National team: France
- Born: 16 July 1996 (age 29) Lons-le-Saunier, France

Sport
- Sport: Paratriathlon
Medal record
Women's paratriathlon (Note: Guide for Annouck Curzillat.)
Representing France
World Championships
Silver medal – second place	2023 Pontevedra	PTVI
European Championships
Gold medal – first place	2021 Valencia	PTVI
Silver medal – second place	2023 Madrid	PTVI
Bronze medal – third place	2022 Olsztyn	PTVI

Julie Marano (born 16 July 1996) is a French triathlete. She started with gymnastics and judo, before discovering triathlon at the age of 10 at the Besançon club.

== Career ==
In 2019, after a course in STAPS, Marano decided to focus on her studies as a physiotherapist and discovered the role of para-athlete guide. She met Annouck Curzillat in the same year and they began working together. In 2021, Curzillat participated in the delayed 2020 Summer Paralympics in Tokyo and won a bronze medal. Marano, who was also finishing her studies, was the latter's replacement guide.

In 2022, the duo reformed with the ambition of shining at the 2024 Summer Paralympics. With more than 20 hours of weekly training that she does at home in Echirolles near Grenoble, internships with Curzillat who trains in Lyon and competitions all over the world, Marano is now fully dedicated to this goal.

== Personal life ==
In December 2022, Marano joined the National Police as an "operational reservist".
