= Lucas Didier =

French para table tennis player

Personal information
- Nationality: French
- Born: 8 July 2003 (age 22) Le Chesnay, France

Sport
- Country: France
- Sport: Para table tennis
- Disability class: C9
Medal record
Para table tennis
Representing France
Paralympic Games
Silver medal – second place	2024 Paris	Singles C9

Lucas Didier (born 8 July 2003) is a French para table tennis player. He represented France at the 2024 Summer Paralympics.

== Career ==
Didier represented France at the 2024 Summer Paralympics and won a silver medal in the singles C9 event.

== Personal life ==
Didier's older brother, Ugo, is a para swimmer for France.
