= Jordan Luce =

French wheelchair basketball player

Personal information
- Nationality: French
- Born: November 30, 1993 Le Lamentin, Martinique, French West Indies
- Years active: 2008–present

Sport
- Sport: Wheelchair basketball
- Disability: Pseudoarthrosis of the right tibia
- Disability class: 4.5
- Team: Léopards de Guyenne (France)

Jordan Luce (born 30 November 1993, in Le Lamentin, Martinique, French West Indies) is a wheelchair basketball player. Born with pseudoarthrosis of the right tibia, Luce moved to France at 16 to pursue a career in basketball. He is a 4.5 classified player.

== Wheelchair basketball ==
Luce was first introduced to wheelchair basketball in a rehabilitation center at 15. He represented France for the first time in 2012 in the Men's European Championships (Group B), where they won gold. Jordan played the 2013/2014 season in the UK with the RGK Wolverhampton Rhinos winning the British Superleague. He currently plays for Léopards de Guyenne in Bordeaux, France.

Luce represented France at the 2024 Paris Paralympics.

== River Island Campaign ==
In 2018, Clothing brand River Island partnered with anti-bullying charity Ditch The Label to collaborate on a marketing campaign, called 'Labels are for clothes'.

As part of the initiative Jordan Luce was photographed and videoed for River Island's Autumn/Winter 2018 Collection. Photographed by Liz Collins and styled by Patrick Mackie.

The campaign was received with general positivity.
