= Thibaut Rigaudeau =

French paratriathlete

Sport
- Country: France
- Sport: Paratriathlon
Medal record
Men's paratriathlon
Representing France
Paralympic Games
Silver medal – second place	2024 Pairs	PTVI
World Championships
Silver medal – second place	2023 Ponteverde	PTVI
Silver medal – second place	2024 Torremolinos	PTVI
European Championships
Silver medal – second place	2021 Valencia	PTVI
Silver medal – second place	2022 Olsztyn	PTVI
Silver medal – second place	2024 Vichy	PTVI
Bronze medal – third place	2023 Madrid	PTVI
Bronze medal – third place	2025 Besançon	PTVI

Thibaut Rigaudeau is a French paratriathlete. He competed at the 2024 Summer Paralympics, winning a silver medal in the men's PTVI event.
