= Ludovic Lemoine =

French wheelchair fencer born 1986)

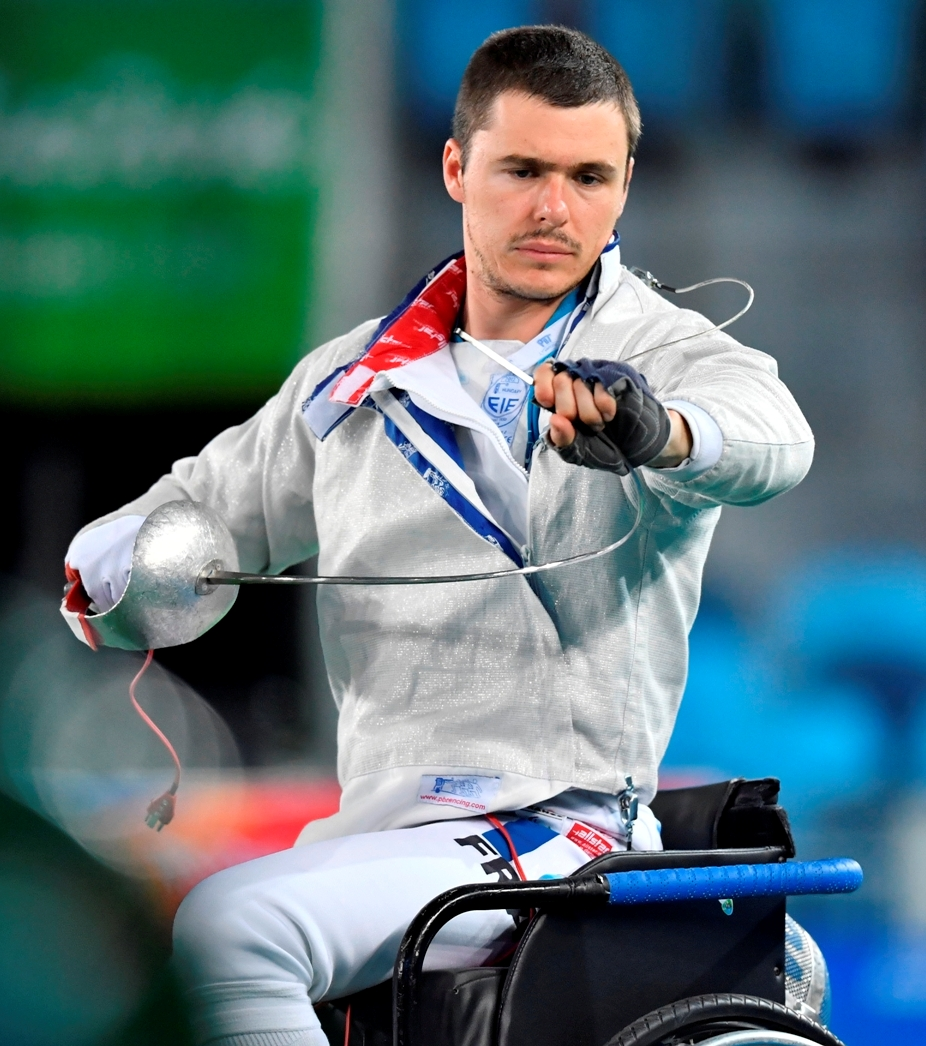
- Lemoine at the 2016 Summer Paralympics

Personal information
- Born: 25 May 1986 (age 40) Vannes, France

Sport
- Sport: Wheelchair fencing
Medal record
Men's wheelchair fencing
Representing France
Paralympic Games
Silver medal – second place	2012 London	Team foil
Bronze medal – third place	2016 Rio de Janeiro	Team foil
Bronze medal – third place	2024 Paris	Team foil

Ludovic Lemoine (born 25 May 1986) is a French wheelchair fencer.

== Career ==
Lemoine represented France at the Summer Paralympic Games and won a silver medal in the team foil in 2012 and a bronze medal in the team foil in 2016. He again represented France at the 2024 Summer Paralympics and won a bronze medal in the team foil event.
