= Agathe Pauli =

French para swimmer (born 2003)

Personal information
- Born: 19 July 2003 (age 22) Marseille, France

Sport
- Sport: Para swimming
- Disability class: S9, SM9
Medal record
Representing France
World Championships
Silver medal – second place	2023 Manchester	Mixed 4 × 100 m freestyle relay (34 pts)
Bronze medal – third place	2025 Singapore	Mixed 4 × 100 m freestyle relay (34 pts)
European Championships
Silver medal – second place	2024 Funchal	4 × 100 metre

Agathe Pauli (born 19 July 2003) is a French para swimmer who competes in international swimming competitions. Competing in the S9 classification, she has competed in the European Championships, Summer Paralympics and the World Para Swimming Championships.

== Early life ==
Pauli was born in Marseille with amelia on her right leg.

== Career ==
At the 2023 World Para Swimming Championships, Pauli was part of the French team that won the silver medal in the mixed 4 × 100 m freestyle relay (34 pts).

In April 2024, Pauli competed at the 2024 World Para Swimming European Open Championships and won a silver medal in the 4 × 100 metre freestyle. Two months later, she competed in the Para Swimming World Series event in Limoges, where she won the 400 m freestyle. Pauli competed at the 2024 Summer Paralympics held in Paris, France, where she competed in the 400 m freestyle S9 and finished in sixth place. She also competed in the 4 × 100 m freestyle relay 34 pts and 4 × 100 m medley relay (34 pts).

At the 2025 World Para Swimming Championships held in Singapore, Pauli competed in three events, including the mixed 4x100 m freestyle relay (34pts), where she won a silver medal.
