= Paula Ossa =

Colombian para-cyclist

Personal information
- Full name: Paula Andrea Ossa Veloza
- Nationality: Colombian
- Born: 25 March 1992 (age 34) Bogotá, Colombia

Sport
- Sport: Para-cycling
- Disability class: C5
Medal record
Representing Colombia
Women's para-cycling
Paralympic Games
Bronze medal – third place	2024 Paris	Road race C4–5
Road World Championships
Silver medal – second place	2018 Maniago	Road race C5
Bronze medal – third place	2023 Glasgow	Road race C5
Track World Championships
Bronze medal – third place	2023 Glasgow	Scratch race C5
Parapan American Games
Gold medal – first place	2023 Santiago	Road race C4-5
Silver medal – second place	2019 Lima	Road race C4-5
Bronze medal – third place	2023 Santiago	Time trial C1–5
Bronze medal – third place	2023 Santiago	Pursuit C5
Pan American Road Championships
Gold medal – first place	2022 Maringá	Time trial C5
Silver medal – second place	2022 Maringá	Road race C5
Pan American Track Championships
Gold medal – first place	2022 Maringá	Scratch C5
Silver medal – second place	2022 Maringá	Time trial C5
Silver medal – second place	2022 Maringá	Individual pursuit C5
Silver medal – second place	2022 Maringá	Omnium C5
South American Para Games
Gold medal – first place	2026 Valledupar	Road race C4-5
Gold medal – first place	2026 Valledupar	Time trial C4-5

Paula Andrea Ossa Veloza (born 25 March 1992) is a Colombian Para-cyclist.

== Career ==
Ossa represented Colombia in the road race C4–5 event at the 2024 Summer Paralympics and won a bronze medal.
