= Rossana Pasquino =

Italian scientist and wheelchair fencer

Personal information
- Nationality: Italian
- Born: 12 October 1982 (age 43)
- Home town: Naples, Italy
- Education: University of Naples

Sport
- Sport: Wheelchair fencing
Medal record
Women's wheelchair fencing
Representing Italy
Paralympic Games
Bronze medal – third place	2024 Paris	Team foil

Rossana Pasquino (born 12 October 1982) is an Italian rheologist and wheelchair fencer.

== Career ==
Pasquino represented Italy at the 2024 Summer Paralympics and won a bronze medal in the team foil event.
