= Cécile Demaude =

French wheelchair fencer

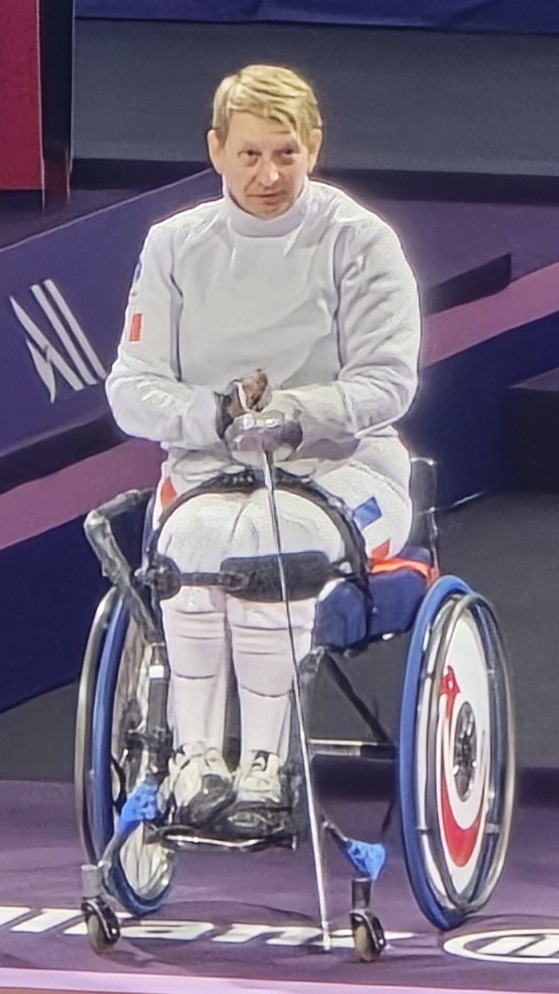
- Démaude at 2024 Summer Paralympics

Personal information
- Born: 1 June 1972 (age 54) Maisons-Alfort, country

Sport
- Sport: Wheelchair fencing
- Disability: Multiple sclerosis
Medal record
Representing France
European Championships
Silver medal – second place	2024 Paris	Team épée
Bronze medal – third place	2022 Warsaw	Individual épée B

Cécile Demaude (born 1 June 1972) is a French wheelchair fencer who competes in international fencing competitions. She is a European silver medalist and has competed at the 2012 and 2016 Summer Paralympics, she has qualified to compete at the 2024 Summer Paralympics.
