= Marie Patouillet =

French Paralympic cyclist

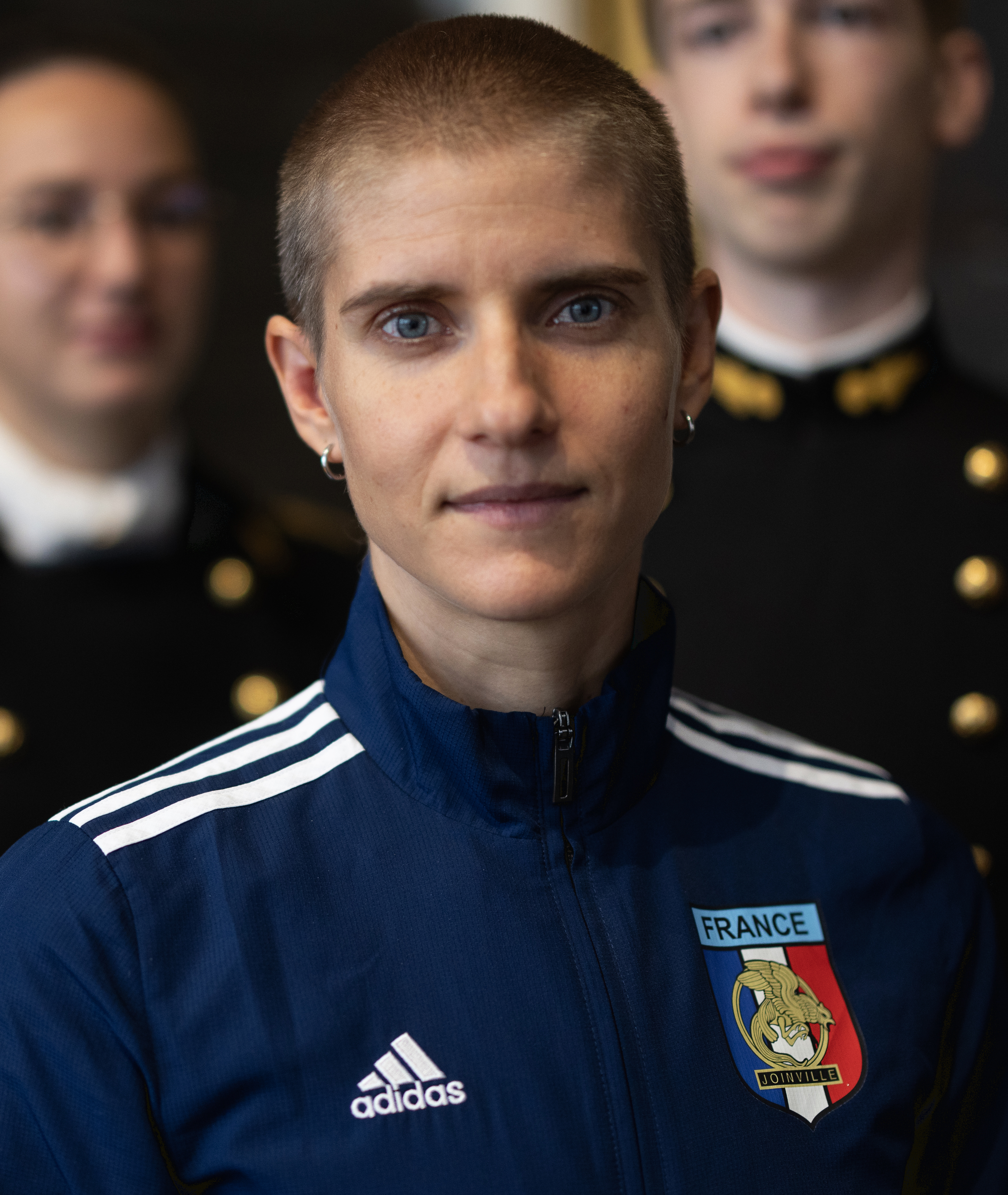

Personal information
- Born: 7 August 1988 (age 37) Versailles, France

Sport
- Country: France
- Sport: Cycling
- Disability class: C5
Medal record
Paralympic Games
Gold medal – first place	2024 Paris	Ind. pursuit C5
Silver medal – second place	2024 Paris	Time trial C4–5
Bronze medal – third place	2020 Tokyo	Pursuit C5
Bronze medal – third place	2020 Tokyo	Road Race C4–5
Road World Championships
Gold medal – first place	2022 Baie-Comeau	Road race C5
Track World Championships
Gold medal – first place	2024 Rio de Janeiro	Scratch race C5
Gold medal – first place	2024 Rio de Janeiro	Omnium C5
Silver medal – second place	2019 Apeldoorn	Time trial C5
Silver medal – second place	2020 Milton	500m time trial C5
Silver medal – second place	2020 Milton	Omnium C5
Silver medal – second place	2022 Saint-Quentin-en-Yvelines	Time trial C5
Silver medal – second place	2022 Saint-Quentin-en-Yvelines	Omnium C5
Silver medal – second place	2023 Glasgow	500m time trial C5
Silver medal – second place	2024 Rio de Janeiro	500m time trial C5
Bronze medal – third place	2022 Saint-Quentin-en-Yvelines	Scratch race C5
Bronze medal – third place	2023 Glasgow	Omnium C5

Marie Patouillet (born 7 August 1988) is a French cyclist who competes in C5 classification, physician, and LGBT+ activist.

== Life ==
Patouillet was born in 1988. She spent a decade in the French army before leaving to be a General practitioner in Paris. Patouillet is openly lesbian. She is an active LGBTQ activist in France.

== Career ==
Patouillet competed at the women's individual pursuit C5 event at the 2020 Summer Paralympics, winning bronze. She also won the silver medal in the women's time trial at the 2019 UCI Para-cycling Track World Championships

She competed at the 2024 Paris Paralympics and she was the home favourite for the women’s C4-5 500m time trial final. In the end she took the silver medal to the Dutch cyclist Caroline Groot's gold. She beat the Tokyo silver medallist Kate O’Brien who came third.
