= Nicole Murray =

New Zealand Paralympic cyclist

- Murray at the 2026 Track World Championships

Personal information
- Born: 13 October 1992 (age 34)

Sport
- Country: New Zealand
- Sport: Para-cycling
- Disability class: C5
Medal record
Women's para-cycling
Representing New Zealand
Paralympic Games
| Bronze medal – third place | 2024 Paris | Ind. pursuit C5 |
Track World Championships
| Gold medal – first place | 2022 Saint-Quentin-en-Yvelines | Scratch race C5 |
| Gold medal – first place | 2022 Saint-Quentin-en-Yvelines | Omnium C5 |
| Gold medal – first place | 2026 Apeldoorn | Elimination C5 |
| Silver medal – second place | 2018 Rio de Janeiro | Individual pursuit C5 |
| Silver medal – second place | 2023 Glasgow | Individual pursuit C5 |
| Silver medal – second place | 2024 Rio de Janeiro | Individual pursuit C5 |
| Silver medal – second place | 2024 Rio de Janeiro | Omnium C5 |
| Silver medal – second place | 2025 Rio de Janeiro | 1 km time trial C5 |
| Silver medal – second place | 2025 Rio de Janeiro | Elimination C5 |
| Silver medal – second place | 2026 Apeldoorn | Sprint C5 |
| Bronze medal – third place | 2022 Saint-Quentin-en-Yvelines | Individual pursuit C5 |
| Bronze medal – third place | 2023 Glasgow | 500 m time trial C5 |
| Bronze medal – third place | 2024 Rio de Janeiro | 500 m time trial C5 |
| Bronze medal – third place | 2024 Rio de Janeiro | Scratch race C5 |
| Bronze medal – third place | 2025 Rio de Janeiro | Scratch race C5 |
Road World Championships
| Silver medal – second place | 2022 Baie-Comeau | Time trial C5 |
| Bronze medal – third place | 2022 Baie-Comeau | Road race C5 |
| Bronze medal – third place | 2025 Ronse | Time trial C5 |
Commonwealth Games
| Bronze medal – third place | 2026 Glasgow | Individual pursuit C4-5 |

Nicole Murray (born 13 October 1992) is a New Zealand para-cyclist. She competed at the 2024 Summer Paralympics and won a bronze medal in the individual pursuit C5 event.

== Career ==
Nicole has won multiple medals at Para Cycling World Championships, including a silver medal at the 2018 UCI Para-cycling Track World Championships, a silver and a bronze at the 2022 UCI Para Cycling Road World Championships, and two golds and a bronze at the 2022 UCI Para Cycling Track World Championships.

== Awards and honours ==
Nicole won Best Female Summer Athlete at the 2023 PARA SPORT Awards.

In 2024, she was among only 6 athletes worldwide to be nominated for the World Sportsperson of the Year with a Disability Award.

== Classification and adapted equipment ==
Nicole rides in the C5 classification. Her left hand is amputated below the wrist, and she rides with some adaptations on her bikes.

== Hometown and other interests ==
Nicole is from Ngahinapouri, in the Waikato region of New Zealand. She enjoys outdoor pursuits such as caving and surfing.
