= Swimming at the 2020 Summer Paralympics – Men's 100 metre backstroke =

The Men's 100 metre backstroke swimming events for the 2020 Summer Paralympics took place at the Tokyo Aquatics Centre from August 25 to September 3, 2021. A total of 11 events were contested over this distance.

== Schedule ==
H	Heats	½	Semifinals	F	Final

Date	Wed 25		Thu 26		Fri 27		Sat 28		Sun 29		Mon 30		Tue 31		Wed 1		Thu 2		Fri 3	
Event	M	E	M	E	M	E	M	E	M	E	M	E	M	E	M	E	M	E	M	E
S1 100m	H	F																		
S2 100m	H	F																		
S6 100m																			H	F
S7 100m											H	F								
S8 100m					H	F														
S9 100m											H	F								
S10 100m																	H	F		
S11 100m							H	F												
S12 100m					H	F														
S13 100m			H	F																
S14 100m																	H	F		

== Medal summary ==
The following is a summary of the medals awarded across all 100 metre backstroke events.

Classification	Gold		Silver		Bronze	
S1	Iyad Shalabi; Israel	2:28.04	Anton Kol; Ukraine	2:28.29	Francesco Bettella; Italy	2:32.08
S2	Alberto Abarza; Chile	2:00.40	Gabriel dos Santos; Brazil	2:02.47	Vladimir Danilenko; RPC	2:02.74
S6	Jia Hongguang; China	1:12.72	Matías de Andrade; Argentina	1:15.40	Dino Sinovčić; Croatia	1:15.74
S7	Andrii Trusov; Ukraine	1:08.14 WR	Pipo Carlomagno; Argentina	1:08.83	Mark Malyar; Israel	1:10.08
S8	Robert Griswold; United States	1:02.55 WR	Iñigo Llopis; Spain	1:06.82	Liu Fengqi; China	1:07.09
S9	Bogdan Mozgovoi; RPC	1:01.65 PR	Yahor Shchalkanau; Belarus	1:01.96	Timothy Hodge; Australia	1:02.16
S10	Maksym Krypak; Ukraine	57:19 WR	Stefano Raimondi; Italy	59.36	Florent Marais; France	1:01.30
S11	Mykhailo Serbin; Ukraine	1:08.63	Viktor Smyrnov; Ukraine	1:09.36	Yang Bozun; China	1:09.62
S12	Raman Salei; Azerbaijan	1:00.30	Serhiy Klippert; Ukraine	1:00.71	Stephen Clegg; Great Britain	1:01.27
S13	Ihar Boki; Belarus	56.36 WR	Nicolas Guy Turbide; Canada	59.70	Vladimir Sotnikov; RPC	59.86
S14	Benjamin Hance; Australia	57.73 PR	Viacheslav Emeliantsev; RPC	59.05	Reece Dunn; Great Britain	59.97

== Results ==
The following were the results of the finals only of each of the Men's 100 metre backstroke events in each of the classifications. Further details of each event, including where appropriate heats and semi finals results, are available on that event's dedicated page.

=== S1 ===
The S1 category is for swimmers who may have tetraplegia, or some form of loss of muscular power in their legs, arms and hands. These swimmers would regularly use a wheelchair.

The final in this classification took place on 25 August 2021:

Rank	Lane	Name	Nationality	Time	Notes
1st place, gold medalist(s)	4	Iyad Shalabi	Israel	2:28.04	
2nd place, silver medalist(s)	5	Anton Kol	Ukraine	2:28.29	
3rd place, bronze medalist(s)	3	Francesco Bettella	Italy	2:32.08	
4	6	Dimitrios Karypidis	Greece	2:58.07	
5	2	Jose Ronoldo da Silva	Brazil	3:03.18	
6	7	Luis Eduardo Rojas Osorno	Colombia	3:39.25	
7	1	Aliaksei Talai	Belarus	4:01.23	

=== S2 ===
The S2 category is for swimmers who may have limited function in their hands, trunk, and legs, and mainly rely on their arms to swim.

The final in this classification took place on 25 August 2021:

Rank	Lane	Name	Nationality	Time	Notes
1st place, gold medalist(s)	5	Alberto Abarza	Chile	2:00.40	
2nd place, silver medalist(s)	6	Gabriel Geraldo dos Santos Araujo	Brazil	2:02.47	
3rd place, bronze medalist(s)	4	Vladimir Danilenko	RPC	2:02.74	
4	7	Jacek Czech	Poland	2:12.53	
5	1	Aristeidis Makrodimitris	Greece	2:14.54	
6	2	Kamil Otowski	Poland	2:15.09	
7	3	Roman Bondarenko	Ukraine	2:16.71	
8	8	Rodrigo Santillan	Peru	2:21.95	

=== S6 ===
The S6 category is for swimmers who have short stature, arm amputations, or some form of coordination problem on one side of their body.

The final in this classification took place on 3 September 2021:

Rank	Lane	Name	Nationality	Time	Notes
1st place, gold medalist(s)	4	Jia Hongguang	China	1.12.72	
2nd place, silver medalist(s)	5	Matías de Andrade	Argentina	1.15.40	
3rd place, bronze medalist(s)	3	Dino Sinovčić	Croatia	1.15.74	
4	2	Yang Hong	China	1.15.83	
5	6	Wang Jingang	China	1.16.51	
6	1	Laurent Chardard	France	1.19.00	
7	7	Thijs van Hofweegen	Netherlands	1.19.69	
8	8	David Sanchez Sierra	Spain	1.19.92	

=== S7 ===
The S7 category is for swimmers who have one leg and one arm amputation on opposite side, or paralysis on one side of their body. These swimmers have full control of their arms and trunk but variable function in their legs.

The final in this classification took place on 30 August 2021:

Rank	Lane	Name	Nationality	Time	Notes
1st place, gold medalist(s)	5	Andrii Trusov	Ukraine	1:08.14	WR
2nd place, silver medalist(s)	4	Pipo Carlomagno	Argentina	1:08.83	
3rd place, bronze medalist(s)	6	Mark Malyar	Israel	1:10.83	
4	3	Andrei Gladkov	RPC	1:10.58	
5	7	Yevhenii Bohodaiko	Ukraine	1:11.57	
6	2	Federico Bicelli	Italy	1:12.25	
7	8	Inaki Basiloff	Argentina	1:15.00	
8	1	Lucas Nicolas Poggi	Argentina	1:15.22	

=== S8 ===
The S8 category is for swimmers who have a single amputation, or restrictive movement in their hip, knee and ankle joints.

The final in this classification took place on 27 August 2021:

Rank	Lane	Name	Nationality	Time	Notes
1st place, gold medalist(s)	4	Robert Griswold	United States	1:02.55	WR
2nd place, silver medalist(s)	5	Iñigo Llopis Sanz	Spain	1:06.82	
3rd place, bronze medalist(s)	6	Liu Fengqi	China	1:07.09	
4	3	Jesse Aungles	Australia	1:07.94	
5	8	Kota Kubota	Japan	1:09.09	
6	7	Pavel Kuklin	RPC	1:09.26	
7	2	Joseph Peppersack	United States	1:09.45	
8	1	Jurijs Semjonovs	Latvia	1:10.44	

=== S9 ===
The S9 category is for swimmers who have joint restrictions in one leg, or double below-the-knee amputations.

The final in this classification took place on 30 August 2021:

Rank	Lane	Name	Nationality	Time	Notes
1st place, gold medalist(s)	5	Bogdan Mozgovoi	RPC	1:01.65	PR
2nd place, silver medalist(s)	4	Yahor Shchalkanau	Belarus	1:01.96	
3rd place, bronze medalist(s)	3	Timothy Hodge	Australia	1:02.16	
4	6	Ugo Didier	France	1:02.20	
5	2	Simone Barlaam	Italy	1:02.92	
6	7	Jesse Reynolds	New Zealand	1:04.60	
7	8	Barry McClements	Ireland	1:05.76	
8	1	Brenden Hall	Australia	1:05.90	

=== S10 ===
The S10 category is for swimmers who have minor physical impairments, for example, loss of one hand.

The final in this classification took place on 2 September 2021:

Rank	Lane	Name	Nationality	Time	Notes
1st place, gold medalist(s)	4	Maksym Krypak	Ukraine	57.19	WR
2nd place, silver medalist(s)	5	Stefano Raimondi	Italy	59.36	
3rd place, bronze medalist(s)	2	Florent Marais	France	1.01.30	
4	7	Riccardo Menciotti	Italy	1.01.46	
5	6	Bas Takken	Netherlands	1.01.52	
6	3	Querijn Hensen	Netherlands	1.02.19	
7	1	Stanislav Popov	Ukraine	1.03.54	
8	8	Col Pearse	Australia	1.04.41	

=== S11 ===
The S11 category is for swimmers who have severe visual impairments and have very low or no light perception, such as blindness, they are required to wear blackened goggles to compete. They use tappers when competing in swimming events.

The final in this classification took place on 28 August 2021:

Rank	Lane	Name	Nationality	Time	Notes
1st place, gold medalist(s)	6	Mykhailo Serbin	Ukraine	1:08.63	
2nd place, silver medalist(s)	7	Viktor Smyrnov	Ukraine	1:09.36	
3rd place, bronze medalist(s)	4	Yang Bozun	China	1:09.62	
4	5	Rogier Dorsman	Netherlands	1:10.10	
5	3	Már Gunnarsson	Iceland	1:10.36	
6	1	Wojciech Makowski	Poland	1:10.55	
7	8	Oleksandr Artiukhov	Ukraine	1:11.83	
8	2	Marco Meneses	Portugal	1:12.68	

=== S12 ===
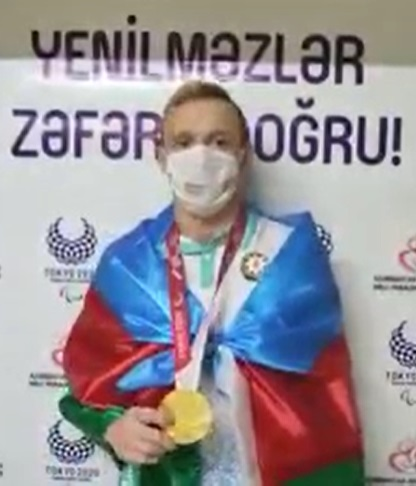
Raman Salei (Azerbaijan) with his gold medal in 100 metre backstroke (S12)

The S12 category is for swimmers who have moderate visual impairment and have a visual field of less than 5 degrees radius. They are required to wear blackened goggles to compete. They may wish to use a tapper.

The final in this classification took place on 27 August 2021:

Rank	Lane	Name	Nationality	Time	Notes
1st place, gold medalist(s)	4	Raman Salei	Azerbaijan	1:00.30	
2nd place, silver medalist(s)	6	Serhiy Klippert	Ukraine	1:00.71	
3rd place, bronze medalist(s)	5	Stephen Clegg	Great Britain	1:01.27	
4	2	Charalampos Taiganidis	Greece	1:02.16	
5	3	Roman Makarov	RPC	1:02.85	
6	1	Artur Saifutdinov	RPC	1:07.36	
7	8	Daniel Giraldo Correa	Colombia	1:08.40	
-	7	Maksim Vashkevich	Belarus	DNS	

=== S13 ===
The S13 category is for swimmers who have minor visual impairment and have high visual acuity. They are required to wear blackened goggles to compete. They may wish to use a tapper.

The final in this classification took place on 26 August 2021:

Rank	Lane	Name	Nationality	Time	Notes
1st place, gold medalist(s)	4	Ihar Boki	Belarus	56.36	WR
2nd place, silver medalist(s)	3	Nicolas-Guy Turbide	Canada	59.70	
3rd place, bronze medalist(s)	2	Vladimir Sotnikov	RPC	59.86	
4	6	Oleksii Virchenko	Ukraine	1:00.48	
5	5	Thomas van Wanrooij	Netherlands	1:00.50	
6	7	Kyrylo Garashchenko	Ukraine	1:02.13	
7	8	Antti Latikka	Finland	1:04.21	
8	1	Genki Saito	Japan	1:04.56	

=== S14 ===
The S14 category is for swimmers who have an intellectual impairment.

The final in this classification took place on 2 September 2021:

Rank	Lane	Name	Nationality	Time	Notes
1st place, gold medalist(s)	4	Benjamin Hance	Australia	57.73	PR
2nd place, silver medalist(s)	8	Viacheslav Emeliantsev	RPC	59.05	
3rd place, bronze medalist(s)	5	Reece Dunn	Great Britain	59.97	
4	1	Jordan Catchpole	Great Britain	1.00.96	
5	3	Lee In-Kook	South Korea	1.00.98	
6	7	Mikhail Kuliabin	RPC	1.01.15	
7	6	Vasyl Krainyk	Ukraine	1.01.16	
8	2	Louis Lawlor	Great Britain	1.01.80	
