= 2020 World Para Swimming European Open Championships – Men's 50 metre freestyle =

The men's 50m freestyle events at the 2020 World Para Swimming European Championships were held at the Penteada Olympic Pools Complex.

== Medalists ==
Event	Gold	Silver	Bronze
S3	Serhii Palamarchuk; Ukraine	Denys Ostapchenko; Ukraine	Vincenzo Boni; Italy
S4	Ami Omer Dadaon; Israel	Luigi Beggiato; Italy	Roman Zhdanov; Russia
S5	Francesco Bocciardo; Italy	Stephan Fuhrer; Switzerland	Antoni Ponce Bertran; Spain
S6	Antonio Fantin; Italy	Lorenzo Perez Escalona; Cuba	Oleksandr Komarov; Ukraine
S7	Andrii Trusov; Ukraine	Yevhenii Bohodaiko; Ukraine	Sergei Sukharev; Russia
S8	Dimosthenis Michalentzakis; Greece	Andrei Nikolaev; Russia	Denys Dubrov; Ukraine
S9	Simone Barlaam; Italy	Denis Tarasov; Russia	Bogdan Mozgovoi; Russia
S10	Maksym Krypak; Ukraine	Stefano Raimondi; Italy	Dmitry Grigoryev; Russia
S11	Edgaras Matakas; Lithuania	Wojciech Makowski; Poland	Mykhailo Serbin; Ukraine
S12	Illia Yaremenko; Ukraine	Maksym Veraksa; Ukraine	Dzmitry Salei; Belarus
S13	Ihar Boki; Belarus	Oleksii Virchenko; Ukraine	Kyrylo Garashchenko; Ukraine

== Results ==
=== S3 ===
Final

Rank	Name	Nationality	Time	Notes
1st place, gold medalist(s)	Serhii Palamarchuk	Ukraine	46.39	
2nd place, silver medalist(s)	Denys Ostapchenko	Ukraine	46.69	
3rd place, bronze medalist(s)	Vincenzo Boni	Italy	47.68	
4	Miguel Angel Martinez Tajuelo	Spain	52.42	
5	Ioannis Kostakis	Greece	57.54	
6	Emmanuele Marigliano	Italy	59.96	
7	Kamil Otowski	Poland	1:03.10	
8	Octavian Ilina	Romania	1:15.43	

=== S4 ===
Heat 1

Rank	Name	Nationality	Time	Notes
1	Luigi Beggiato	Italy	39.35	Q
2	Ami Omer Dadaon	Israel	39.81	Q
3	Roman Zhdanov	Russia	41.24	Q
4	David Smetanine	France	41.40	Q
5	Arnost Petracek	Czech Republic	42.03	Q
6	Andreas Ernhofer	Austria	44.27	Q
7	Matz Topkin	Estonia	45.02	Q
8	Ariel Malyar	Israel	45.78	Q
9	Andrii Derevinskyi	Ukraine	45.89	
10	Tomi Brajsa	Croatia	48.12	

Final

Rank	Name	Nationality	Time	Notes
1st place, gold medalist(s)	Ami Omer Dadaon	Israel	37.60	ER
2nd place, silver medalist(s)	Luigi Beggiato	Italy	38.65	
3rd place, bronze medalist(s)	Roman Zhdanov	Russia	39.98	
4	David Smetanine	France	40.83	
5	Arnost Petracek	Czech Republic	42.05	
6	Ariel Malyar	Israel	42.28	
7	Andreas Ernhofer	Austria	45.34	
8	Andrii Derevinskyi	Ukraine	45.40	

=== S5 ===
Heats

Rank	Heat	Name	Nationality	Time	Notes
1	1	Francesco Bocciardo	Italy	33.40	Q
2	2	Stephan Fuhrer	Switzerland	34.35	Q
3	2	Antoni Ponce Bertran	Spain	35.49	Q
4	2	Luis Huerta Poza	Spain	36.13	Q
5	1	Sebastian Rodriguez	Spain	36.41	Q
6	2	Koral Berkin Kutlu	Turkey	36.31	Q
7	1	Oleksii Kabyshev	Ukraine	36.57	Q
8	2	Siyazbek Daliyev	Kazakhstan	36.67	Q
9	2	Yaroslav Semenenko	Ukraine	37.30	
10	1	Artur Kubasov	Poland	37.81	
11	1	Beytullah Eroglu	Turkey	42.61	
12	2	Ivo Rocha	Portugal	43.95	
13	1	Antonios Tsapatakis	Greece	48.92	

Final

Rank	Name	Nationality	Time	Notes
1st place, gold medalist(s)	Francesco Bocciardo	Italy	32.90	
2nd place, silver medalist(s)	Stephan Fuhrer	Switzerland	34.20	
3rd place, bronze medalist(s)	Antoni Ponce Bertran	Spain	35.75	
4	Sebastian Rodriguez	Spain	35.79	
5	Koral Berkin Kutlu	Turkey	36.22	
6	Oleksii Kabyshev	Ukraine	36.43	
7	Luis Huerta Poza	Spain	36.43	
8	Siyazbek Daliyev	Kazakhstan	36.66	

=== S6 ===
Heats

Rank	Heat	Name	Nationality	Time	Notes
1	2	Antonio Fantin	Italy	29.52	Q, ER
2	2	Oleksandr Komarov	Ukraine	31.39	Q
3	1	Lorenzo Perez Escalona	Cuba	31.70	Q
4	1	Yerzhan Salimgereyev	Kazakhstan	31.71	Q
5	2	Georgios Sfaltos	Greece	32.21	Q
6	1	Panagiotis Christakis	Greece	32.44	Q
7	2	Daniel Videira	Portugal	32.89	Q
8	2	William Perry	Great Britain	33.45	Q
9	1	Leo McCrea	Switzerland	33.49	
10	2	Alejandro Yared Rojas Cabrera	Spain	33.75	
11	1	Dino Sinovčić	Croatia	34.00	
12	2	Viacheslav Lenskii	Russia	34.58	
13	1	Iurii Luchkin	Russia	37.91	
14	2	Fabian Brune	Germany	38.53	
15	1	Radomir Pacak	Slovakia	40.58	

Final

Rank	Name	Nationality	Time	Notes
1st place, gold medalist(s)	Antonio Fantin	Italy	29.11	ER
2nd place, silver medalist(s)	Lorenzo Perez Escalona	Cuba	30.48	
3rd place, bronze medalist(s)	Oleksandr Komarov	Ukraine	31.41	
4	Panagiotis Christakis	Greece	32.12	
5	Yerzhan Salimgereyev	Kazakhstan	32.26	
6	Georgios Sfaltos	Greece	32.33	
7	Daniel Videira	Portugal	32.86	
8	William Perry	Great Britain	33.16	

=== S7 ===
Heats

Rank	Heat	Name	Nationality	Time	Notes
1	1	Sergei Sukharev	Russia	28.06	Q
2	2	Andrii Trusov	Ukraine	28.71	Q
3	2	Yevhenii Bohodaiko	Ukraine	29.14	Q
4	2	Tobias Pollap	Germany	30.25	Q
5	1	Federico Bicelli	Italy	30.36	Q
6	1	Egor Efrosinin	Russia	30.44	Q
7	2	Michael Jones	Great Britain	31.21	Q
8	1	Kalrlo Knezenic	Croatia	33.46	Q
9	2	Ante Rada	Croatia	34.18	
10	1	Niklas Andersson	Sweden	34.38	
11	2	Martin Batka	Slovakia	35.65	

Final

Rank	Name	Nationality	Time	Notes
1st place, gold medalist(s)	Andrii Trusov	Ukraine	27.27	
2nd place, silver medalist(s)	Yevhenii Bohodaiko	Ukraine	28.16	
3rd place, bronze medalist(s)	Sergei Sukharev	Russia	28.26	
4	Federico Bicelli	Italy	28.68	
5	Egor Efrosinin	Russia	28.95	
6	Tobias Pollap	Germany	29.67	
7	Michael Jones	Great Britain	31.17	
8	Karlo Knezevic	Croatia	32.99	

=== S8 ===
Heats

Rank	Heat	Name	Nationality	Time	Notes
1	1	Dimosthenis Michalentzakis	Greece	26.89	Q
2	2	Denys Dubrov	Ukraine	27.49	Q
3	2	Andrei Nikolaev	Russia	27.64	Q
4	2	Sergio Salvador Martos Minguet	Spain	28.24	Q
5	1	Alberto Amodeo	Italy	28.26	Q
6	2	Michal Golus	Poland	28.36	Q
7	1	Bohden Hrynenko	Ukraine	28.45	Q
7	2	Charles Rozoy	France	28.45	Q
9	1	Jurijs Semjonovs	Latvia	29.33	
10	1	Diogo Cancela	Portugal	30.25	
11	2	Vicente Enrique Almonacid Heyl	Chile	33.12	
12	1	Islam Dokaev	Belgium	33.71	

Final

Rank	Name	Nationality	Time	Notes
1st place, gold medalist(s)	Dimosthenis Michalentzakis	Greece	26.84	
2nd place, silver medalist(s)	Andrei Nikolaev	Russia	27.06	
3rd place, bronze medalist(s)	Denys Dubrov	Ukraine	27.45	
4	Sergio Salvador Martos Minguet	Spain	27.97	
5	Alberto Amodeo	Italy	27.98	
6	Bohdan Hrynenko	Ukraine	28.21	
7	Michal Golus	Poland	28.27	
8	Charles Rozoy	France	28.67	

=== S9 ===
Heats

Rank	Heat	Name	Nationality	Time	Notes
1	2	Simone Barlaam	Italy	24.43	Q
2	1	Denis Tarasov	Russia	25.30	Q
3	2	Fredrik Solberg	Norway	25.97	Q
4	1	Yahor Shchalkanau	Belarus	26.19	Q
5	2	Bogdan Mozgovoi	Russia	26.39	Q
6	2	Jose Antonio Mari Alcaraz	Spain	26.52	Q
7	1	Leo Lahteenmaki	Finland	26.55	Q
8	2	Simone Ciulli	Italy	26.56	Q
9	1	Yurii Bozhynskyi	Ukraine	26.71	
10	1	Gino Caetano	Portugal	26.78	
11	1	Ariel Enrique Schrenck Martinez	Spain	26.80	
12	1	Alexander Skaliukh	Russia	26.90	
13	2	Malte Braunschweig	Germany	26.94	
14	2	Illja Tadic	Montenegro	27.44	
15	1	Jonas Kesnar	Czech Republic	28.04	
16	2	Sam de Visser	Belgium	28.34	
17	2	Ibrahim Al Hussein	Refugee Para Team	29.68	

Final

Rank	Name	Nationality	Time	Notes
1st place, gold medalist(s)	Simone Barlaam	Italy	24.06	
2nd place, silver medalist(s)	Denis Tarasov	Russia	25.18	
3rd place, bronze medalist(s)	Bogdan Mozgovoi	Russia	25.43	
4	Fredrik Solberg	Norway	25.59	
5	Yahor Shchalkanau	Belarus	26.13	
6	Leo Lahteenmaki	Finland	26.28	
7	Jose Antonio Mari Alcaraz	Spain	26.39	
8	Simone Ciulli	Italy	26.53	

=== S10 ===
Heats

Rank	Heat	Name	Nationality	Time	Notes
1	2	Maksym Krypak	Ukraine	23.85	Q
2	2	Dmitry Grigoryev	Russia	24.81	Q
3	1	Stefano Raimondi	Italy	24.82	Q
4	2	David Levecq	Spain	25.38	Q
5	1	Dmitrii Bartaskinskii	Russia	25.64	Q
6	1	Riccardo Menciotti	Italy	25.80	Q
7	2	Sergio Vaquero Ajenjo	Spain	26.49	Q
8	2	Jarno Thierens	Belgium	26.50	Q
9	1	Rafal Kalinowski	Poland	26.53	
10	1	Justin Kaps	Germany	26.66	
11	2	Stanislav Popov	Ukraine	27.28	
12	2	Matej Petrlic	Croatia	27.54	
13	1	Artem Isaev	Russia	30.24	

Final

Rank	Name	Nationality	Time	Notes
1st place, gold medalist(s)	Maksym Krypak	Ukraine	23.53	
2nd place, silver medalist(s)	Stefano Raimondi	Italy	23.74	
3rd place, bronze medalist(s)	Dmitry Grigoryev	Russia	24.58	
4	Dmitrii Bartasinskii	Russia	24.94	
5	David Levecq	Spain	25.31	
6	Riccardo Menciotti	Italy	25.57	
7	Jarno Thierens	Belgium	25.83	
8	Sergio Vaquero Ajenjo	Spain	26.32	

=== S11 ===
Heats

Rank	Heat	Name	Nationality	Time	Notes
1	1	Edgaras Matakas	Lithuania	25.89	Q
2	2	Wojciech Makowski	Poland	27.68	Q, SB
3	2	Jose Ramon Cantero Elvira	Spain	27.96	Q
3	2	Mykhailo Serbin	Ukraine	27.96	Q
5	1	Hryhory Zudzilau	Belarus	28.43	Q
6	1	Marco Meneses	Portugal	28.58	Q
7	1	Viktor Smyrnov	Ukraine	28.68	Q
8	1	Oleksandr Artiukhov	Czech Republic	28.93	Q

Final

Rank	Name	Nationality	Time	Notes
1st place, gold medalist(s)	Edgaras Matakas	Lithuania	26.05	
2nd place, silver medalist(s)	Wojciech Makowski	Poland	26.90	
3rd place, bronze medalist(s)	Mykhailo Serbin	Ukraine	27.70	
4	Jose Ramon Cantero Elvira	Spain	27.96	
5	Hryhory Zudzilau	Belarus	28.14	
6	Viktor Smyrnov	Ukraine	28.27	
7	Marco Meneses	Portugal	28.56	
8	Oleksandr Artiukhov	Ukraine	28.71	

=== S12 ===
Heats

Rank	Heat	Name	Nationality	Time	Notes
1	2	Illia Yaremenko	Ukraine	23.94	Q
2	2	Dzmitry Salei	Belarus	24.18	Q
3	1	Maksym Veraksa	Ukraine	24.23	Q
4	1	Raman Salei	Azerbaijan	24.35	Q
5	2	Oleksii Fedyna	Ukraine	25.22	Q
6	1	Uladzimir Izotau	Belarus	25.94	Q
7	1	Uladzimir Sotnikau	Belarus	26.10	Q
8	2	Quentin Vieira	France	28.04	Q
9	1	Serghei Sirovatchin	Moldova	29.33	

Final

Rank	Name	Nationality	Time	Notes
1st place, gold medalist(s)	Illia Yaremenko	Ukraine	23.89	
2nd place, silver medalist(s)	Maksym Veraksa	Ukraine	24.26	
3rd place, bronze medalist(s)	Dzmitry Salei	Belarus	24.43	
4	Raman Salei	Azerbaijan	24.47	
5	Oleksii Fedyna	Ukraine	24.98	
6	Uladzimir Izotau	Belarus	25.31	
7	Uladzimir Sotnikau	Belarus	25.96	
—	Quentin Vieira	France	DNS	

=== S13 ===
Heats

Rank	Heat	Name	Nationality	Time	Notes
1	2	Ihar Boki	Belarus	23.47	Q
2	2	Oleksii Virchenko	Ukraine	24.14	Q
3	1	Kyrylo Garashchenko	Ukraine	24.48	Q
4	1	Taliso Engel	Germany	24.50	Q
5	2	Alex Portal	France	25.07	Q
6	1	Kamil Rzetelski	Poland	25.28	Q
7	2	Ivan Salguero Oteiza	Spain	25.58	Q
8	2	Gabriel Steen	Norway	25.72	Q
9	1	Roman Agalakov	Kazakhstan	26.28	
10	2	Adrian Jastrzebski	Poland	26.44	
11	1	Enrique José Alhambra Mollar	Spain	26.64	
12	1	Nurali Sovetkanov	Kazakhstan	26.91	
13	1	Maksim Nikiforov	Russia	26.96	
14	2	Sean O'Riordan	Ireland	27.54	
15	2	Kylian Portal	France	28.28	

Final

Rank	Name	Nationality	Time	Notes
1st place, gold medalist(s)	Ihar Boki	Belarus	23.32	
2nd place, silver medalist(s)	Oleksii Virchenko	Ukraine	24.20	
3rd place, bronze medalist(s)	Kyrylo Garashchenko	Ukraine	24.24	
4	Taliso Engel	Germany	24.52	
5	Alex Portal	France	25.09	
6	Kamil Rzetelski	Poland	25.25	
7	Ivan Salguero Oteiza	Spain	25.60	
8	Gabriel Steen	Norway	25.84	
