= 2020 World Para Swimming European Open Championships – Men's 100 metre freestyle =

The men's 100m freestyle events at the 2020 World Para Swimming European Open Championships were held at the Penteada Olympic Pools Complex.

== Medalists ==
Event	Gold	Silver	Bronze
S4	Ami Omer Dadaon; Israel	Roman Zhdanov; Russia	Luigi Beggiato; Italy
S5	Francesco Bocciardo; Italy	Antoni Ponce Bertran; Spain	Stephan Fuhrer; Switzerland
S6	Antonio Fantin; Italy	Oleksandr Komarov; Ukraine	Lorenzo Perez Escalona; Cuba
S7	Federico Bicelli; Italy	Andrii Trusov; Ukraine	Sergei Sukharev; Russia
S8	Dimosthenis Michalentzakis; Greece	Andrei Nikolaev; Russia	Alberto Amodeo; Italy
S9	Simone Barlaam; Italy	Ugo Didier; France	Bogdan Mozgovoi; Russia
S10	Maksym Krypak; Ukraine	Stefano Raimondi; Italy	Dmitrii Bartasinskii; Russia
S11	Edgaras Matakas; Lithuania	Mykhailo Serbin; Ukraine	Wojciech Makowski; Poland
S12	Raman Salei; Azerbaijan	Maksym Veraksa; Ukraine	Dzmitry Salei; Belarus
S13	Ihar Boki; Belarus	Kyrylo Garashchenko; Ukraine	Oleksii Virchenko; Ukraine
S14	Gabriel Bandeira; Brazil	Viacheslav Emeliantsev; Russia	Mikhail Kuliabin; Russia

== Results ==
=== S4 ===
Final

Rank	Name	Nationality	Time	Notes
1st place, gold medalist(s)	Ami Omer Dadaon	Israel	1:19.77	WR
2nd place, silver medalist(s)	Roman Zhdanov	Russia	1:24.08	
3rd place, bronze medalist(s)	Luigi Beggiato	Italy	1:25.29	
4	David Smetanine	France	1:27.81	
5	Andrii Derevinskyi	Ukraine	1:38.07	
6	Vincenzo Boni	Italy	1:40.15	
7	Tomi Brajsa	Croatia	1:40.41	
8	Vladimir Danilenko	Russia	2:09.94	

=== S5 ===
Heat 1

Rank	Name	Nationality	Time	Notes
1	Francesco Bocciardo	Italy	1:10.93	Q
2	Antoni Ponce Bertran	Spain	1:13.98	Q
3	Stephan Fuhrer	Switzerland	1:15.92	Q
4	Luis Huerta Poza	Spain	1:18.41	Q
5	Artur Kubasov	Russia	1:19.60	Q
6	Sebastian Rodriguez	Spain	1:20.21	Q
7	Koral Berkin Kutlu	Turkey	1:22.96	Q
8	Oleksii Kabyshev	Ukraine	1:26.71	Q
9	Ivo Rocha	Portugal	1:31.30	

Final

Rank	Name	Nationality	Time	Notes
1st place, gold medalist(s)	Francesco Bocciardo	Italy	1:10.10	
2nd place, silver medalist(s)	Antoni Ponce Bertran	Spain	1:14.52	
3rd place, bronze medalist(s)	Stephan Fuhrer	Switzerland	1:14.99	
4	Luis Huerta Poza	Spain	1:17.94	
5	Sebastian Rodriguez	Spain	1:18.97	
6	Artur Kubasov	Russia	1:20.09	
7	Oleksii Kabyshev	Ukraine	1:31.76	
—	Koral Berkin Kutlu	Turkey	DSQ	

=== S6 ===
Heats

Rank	Heat	Name	Nationality	Time	Notes
1	2	Antonio Fantin	Italy	1:04.01	Q, WR
2	2	Laurent Chardard	France	1:09.09	Q
3	1	Oleksandr Komarov	Ukraine	1:10.86	Q
4	2	Georgios Sfaltos	Greece	1:11.08	Q
5	2	Viacheslav Lenksii	Russia	1:11.13	Q
6	1	Lorenzo Perez Escalona	Cuba	1:11.68	Q
7	2	Leo McCrea	Switzerland	1:12.87	Q
8	1	Yerzhan Salimgereyev	Kazakhstan	1:12.92	Q
9	1	Dino Sinovčić	Croatia	1:13.74	
10	1	Bence Ivan	Hungary	1:14.88	
11	2	Panagiotis Christakis	Greece	1:15.47	
12	2	William Perry	Great Britain	1:15.77	
13	1	Iurii Luchkin	Russia	1:17.94	
14	1	Andrei Granichka	Russia	1:18.24	
15	2	Alejandro Yared Rojas Cabrera	Spain	1:19.10	
16	2	Patrick Flanagan	Ireland	1:19.34	
17	1	Leonardo Renic	Croatia	1:19.71	
18	1	Fabian Brune	Germany	1:26.85	
19	1	Radomir Pacak	Slovakia	1:27.85	
20	2	Petr Andrysek	Czech Republic	1:43.23	

Final

Rank	Name	Nationality	Time	Notes
1st place, gold medalist(s)	Antonio Fantin	Italy	1:03.76	WR
2nd place, silver medalist(s)	Oleksandr Komarov	Ukraine	1:07.12	
3rd place, bronze medalist(s)	Lorenzo Perez Escalona	Cuba	1:07.60	
4	Laurent Chardard	France	1:08.60	
5	Viacheslav Lenskii	Russia	1:09.68	
6	Yerzhan Salimgereyev	Kazakhstan	1:10.89	
7	Georgios Sfaltos	Greece	1:11.79	
8	Leo McCrea	Switzerland	1:13.46	

=== S7 ===
Heat 1

Rank	Name	Nationality	Time	Notes
1	Sergei Sukharev	Russia	1:05.06	Q
2	Andrii Trusov	Ukraine	1:05.93	Q
3	Tobias Pollap	Germany	1:06.16	Q
4	Federico Bicelli	Italy	1:06.50	Q
5	Michael Jones	Great Britain	1:06.60	Q
6	Yevhenii Bohodaiko	Ukraine	1:07.60	Q
7	Karlo Knezevic	Croatia	1:14.42	Q
8	Martin Batka	Slovakia	1:20.60	Q
9	Egor Efrosinin	Russia	1:22.18	

Final

Rank	Name	Nationality	Time	Notes
1st place, gold medalist(s)	Federico Bicelli	Italy	1:01.04	
2nd place, silver medalist(s)	Andrii Trusov	Ukraine	1:01.12	
3rd place, bronze medalist(s)	Sergei Sukharev	Russia	1:03.40	
4	Yevhenii Bohodaiko	Ukraine	1:03.43	
5	Tobias Pollap	Germany	1:04.68	
6	Michael Jones	Great Britain	1:06.64	
7	Karlo Knezevic	Croatia	1:13.34	
8	Martin Batka	Slovakia	1:18.04	

=== S8 ===
Heats

Rank	Heat	Name	Nationality	Time	Notes
1	1	Andrei Nikolaev	Russia	1:00.68	Q
2	2	Alberto Amodeo	Italy	1:01.67	Q
3	2	Dimosthenis Michalentzakis	Greece	1:02.35	Q
4	1	Inigo Llopis Sanz	Spain	1:02.61	Q
5	1	Denys Dubrov	Ukraine	1:02.86	Q
6	2	Michal Golus	Poland	1:03.17	Q
7	2	Bohdan Hrynenko	Ukraine	1:04.12	Q
8	1	Carlos Martinez Fernandez	Spain	1:06.07	Q
9	2	Petr Fryba	Czech Republic	1:06.23	
10	2	Islam Dokaev	Belgium	1:11.35	
—	1	Vicente Enrique Almonacid Heyl	Chile	DSQ	

Final

Rank	Name	Nationality	Time	Notes
1st place, gold medalist(s)	Dimosthenis Michalentzakis	Greece	58.52	
2nd place, silver medalist(s)	Andrei Nikolaev	Russia	58.58	
3rd place, bronze medalist(s)	Alberto Amodeo	Italy	59.88	
4	Inigo Llopis Sanz	Spain	1:00.93	
5	Denys Dubrov	Ukraine	1:01.22	
6	Bohdan Hrynenko	Ukraine	1:01.78	
7	Michal Golus	Poland	1:02.42	
8	Carlos Martinez Fernandez	Spain	1:04.52	

=== S9 ===
Heats

Rank	Heat	Name	Nationality	Time	Notes
1	1	Simone Barlaam	Italy	56.02	Q
2	2	Denis Tarasov	Russia	56.92	Q
3	1	Bogdan Mozgovoi	Russia	56.93	Q
4	2	Yahor Shchalkanau	Belarus	57.37	Q
5	2	Malte Braunschweig	Germany	57.60	Q
6	1	Ariel Enrique Schrenck Martinez	Spain	57.63	Q
7	1	Federico Morlacchi	Italy	57.69	Q
8	2	Ugo Didier	France	57.71	Q
9	1	Jose Antonio Mari Alcaraz	Spain	57.79	
10	1	Simone Ciulli	Italy	57.88	
11	2	Gino Caetano	Portugal	58.34	
12	1	Leo Lahteenmaki	Finland	58.71	
13	1	Fredrik Solberg	Norway	58.84	
14	2	Alexander Skaliukh	Russia	59.04	
15	2	Igor Hrehorowicz	Poland	59.71	
16	2	Sam de Visser	Belgium	1:01.60	
17	2	Jonas Kesnar	Czech Republic	1:02.44	
18	1	Ibrahim Al Hussein	Refugee Para Team	1:06.76	

Final

Rank	Name	Nationality	Time	Notes
1st place, gold medalist(s)	Simone Barlaam	Italy	53.03	WR
2nd place, silver medalist(s)	Ugo Didier	France	55.95	
3rd place, bronze medalist(s)	Bogden Mozgovoi	Russia	56.24	
4	Denis Tarasov	Russia	56.26	
5	Yahor Shchalkanau	Belarus	56.40	
6	Malte Braunschweig	Germany	57.53	
7	Ariel Enrique Schrenck Martinez	Spain	57.66	
8	Federico Morlacchi	Italy	57.72	

=== S10 ===
Heats

Rank	Heat	Name	Nationality	Time	Notes
1	1	Stefano Raimondi	Italy	54.82	Q
2	1	Alan Ogorzalek	Poland	55.31	Q
3	1	David Levecq	Spain	55.80	Q
4	2	Maksym Krypak	Ukraine	56.05	Q
4	1	Jarno Thierens	Belgium	56.05	Q
6	2	Dmitry Grigoryev	Russia	56.31	Q
7	2	Justin Kaps	Germany	56.82	Q
8	2	Dmitrii Bartasinskii	Russia	57.03	Q
9	1	Sergio Vaquero Ajenjo	Spain	57.19	
10	1	Tadeas Strasik	Czech Republic	58.47	
11	2	Matej Petrlic	Croatia	59.10	
12	2	Artem Isaev	Russia	1:04.46	

Final

Rank	Name	Nationality	Time	Notes
1st place, gold medalist(s)	Maksym Krypak	Ukraine	51.16	
2nd place, silver medalist(s)	Stefano Raimondi	Italy	51.53	
3rd place, bronze medalist(s)	Dmitrii Bartasinskii	Russia	54.31	
4	Dmitry Grigoryev	Russia	54.72	
5	Alan Ogorzalek	Poland	54.92	
6	David Levecq	Spain	55.55	
7	Jarno Thierens	Belgium	55.82	
8	Justin Kaps	Germany	56.16	

=== S11 ===
Heats

Rank	Heat	Name	Nationality	Time	Notes
1	2	Edgaras Matakas	Lithuania	59.73	Q
2	2	Jose Ramon Cantero Elvira	Spain	1:01.90	Q
3	2	Mykhailo Serbin	Ukraine	1:02.02	Q
4	1	Wojciech Makowski	Poland	1:02.32	Q
5	2	Hryhory Zudzilau	Belarus	1:03.14	Q
6	1	Marco Meneses	Portugal	1:04.30	Q
7	1	Viktor Smyrnov	Ukraine	1:05.15	Q
8	1	Már Gunnarsson	Iceland	1:05.38	Q
9	1	Mikhail Chaikin	Russia	1:05.70	
10	2	Przemyslaw Drag	Poland	1:06.54	
11	2	David Kratochvil	Czech Republic	1:07.26	
12	1	Johannes Weinberg	Germany	1:10.96	

Final

Rank	Name	Nationality	Time	Notes
1st place, gold medalist(s)	Edgaras Matakas	Lithuania	58.83	
2nd place, silver medalist(s)	Mykhailo Serbin	Ukraine	1:00.19	
3rd place, bronze medalist(s)	Wojciech Makowski	Poland	1:00.77	
4	Jose Ramon Cantero Elvira	Spain	1:00.80	
5	Hryhory Zudzilau	Belarus	1:02.42	
6	Viktor Smyrnov	Ukraine	1:03.70	
7	Már Gunnarsson	Iceland	1:04.21	
8	Marco Meneses	Portugal	1:04.42	

=== S12 ===
Heats

Rank	Heat	Name	Nationality	Time	Notes
1	1	Raman Salei	Azerbaijan	54.23	Q
2	2	Dzmitry Salei	Belarus	54.28	Q
3	2	Maksym Veraksa	Ukraine	54.36	Q
4	2	Illia Yaremenko	Ukraine	54.76	Q
5	2	Charalampos Taiganidis	Greece	55.78	Q
6	1	Sergii Klippert	Ukraine	56.74	Q
7	1	Roman Makarov	Russia	57.33	Q
8	2	Maksim Vashkevich	Belarus	57.39	Q
9	1	Uladzimir Sotnikau	Belarus	57.86	
10	2	Artur Saifutdinov	Russia	58.25	
11	1	Yasmany Izquierdo Rojas	Cuba	1:01.56	

Final

Rank	Name	Nationality	Time	Notes
1st place, gold medalist(s)	Raman Salei	Azerbaijan	53.06	
2nd place, silver medalist(s)	Maksym Veraksa	Ukraine	53.56	
3rd place, bronze medalist(s)	Dzmitry Salei	Belarus	54.03	
4	Illia Yaremenko	Ukraine	54.17	
5	Charalampos Taiganidis	Greece	55.64	
6	Sergii Klippert	Ukraine	56.93	
7	Maksim Vashkevich	Belarus	57.34	
8	Roman Makarov	Russia	57.77	

=== S13 ===
Heats

Rank	Heat	Name	Nationality	Time	Notes
1	2	Ihar Boki	Belarus	51.09	Q
2	1	Kyrylo Garashchenko	Ukraine	53.34	Q
3	2	Oleksii Virchenko	Ukraine	54.30	Q
4	1	Ivan Salguero Oteiza	Spain	55.38	Q
5	1	Taliso Engel	Germany	55.42	Q
6	2	Kamil Rzetelski	Poland	56.61	Q
7	1	Juan Ferron Gutierrez	Spain	58.12	Q
8	2	Adrian Jastrzebski	Poland	58.25	Q
9	1	Maksim Nikiforov	Russia	58.73	
10	2	Roman Agalakov	Kazakhstan	58.91	
11	2	Sean O'Riordan	Ireland	1:00.40	

Final

Rank	Name	Nationality	Time	Notes
1st place, gold medalist(s)	Ihar Boki	Belarus	50.85	
2nd place, silver medalist(s)	Kyrylo Garashchenko	Ukraine	52.34	
3rd place, bronze medalist(s)	Oleksii Virchenko	Ukraine	53.69	
4	Ivan Salguero Oteiza	Spain	54.79	
5	Taliso Engel	Germany	55.28	
6	Kamil Rzetelski	Poland	55.98	
7	Juan Ferron Gutierrez	Spain	57.48	
8	Adrian Jastrzebski	Poland	58.21	

=== S14 ===
Heats

Rank	Heat	Name	Nationality	Time	Notes
1	1	Thomas Hamer	Great Britain	54.42	Q
2	2	Mikhail Kuliabin	Russia	54.63	Q
3	2	Gabriel Bandeira	Brazil	54.64	Q
4	2	Vasyl Krainyk	Ukraine	54.98	Q
5	2	Misha Palazzo	Italy	55.15	Q
6	2	Viacheslav Emeliantsev	Russia	55.20	Q
7	2	Andrei Shabalin	Russia	55.96	Q
8	1	Nathan Maillet	France	56.17	Q
9	1	Conner Morrison	Great Britain	57.10	
10	2	Nader Khalili	Finland	57.18	
11	2	Joao Pedro Brutos de Oliveira	Brazil	57.29	
12	1	Javier Labrador Fernandez	Spain	58.69	
13	1	Adrian Longaron Carreras	Spain	59.11	
14	1	Simon Blaise	France	1:03.35	

Final

Rank	Name	Nationality	Time	Notes
1st place, gold medalist(s)	Gabriel Bandeira	Brazil	51.60	AM
2nd place, silver medalist(s)	Viacheslav Emeliantsev	Russia	52.44	
3rd place, bronze medalist(s)	Mikhail Kuliabin	Russia	53.84	
4	Thomas Hamer	Great Britain	54.24	
4	Vasyl Krainyk	Ukraine	54.24	
6	Misha Palazzo	Italy	55.48	
7	Andrei Shabalin	Russia	55.86	
8	Nathan Maillet	France	56.30	
