= Swimming at the 2020 Summer Paralympics – Men's 100 metre backstroke S9 =

Men's 100 metre backstroke S9 at the XVI Paralympic Games
- Venue: Tokyo Aquatics Centre
- Dates: 30 August 2021
- Competitors: 12 from 10 nations

Medalists
1st place, gold medalist(s)		Bogdan Mozgovoi	RPC
2nd place, silver medalist(s)		Yahor Shchalkanau	Belarus
3rd place, bronze medalist(s)		Timothy Hodge	Australia

The Men's 100 metre backstroke S9 event at the 2020 Paralympic Games took place on 30 August 2021, at the Tokyo Aquatics Centre.

== Heats ==
The swimmers with the top eight times, regardless of heat, advanced to the final.

Rank	Heat	Lane	Name	Nationality	Time	Notes
1	2	3	Yahor Shchalkanau	Belarus	1:02.42	Q
2	2	4	Bogdan Mozgovoi	RPC	1:02.65	Q
3	1	5	Timothy Hodge	Australia	1:02.81	Q
4	2	5	Ugo Didier	France	1:03.32	Q
5	1	4	Simone Barlaam	Italy	1:04.27	Q
6	1	3	Jesse Reynolds	New Zealand	1:04.58	Q
7	1	6	Brenden Hall	Australia	1:05.78	Q
8	2	7	Barry McClements	Ireland	1:06.31	Q
9	2	2	Jendi Pangabean	Indonesia	1:07.10	
10	1	7	Simone Ciulli	Italy	1:07.41	
11	2	6	Andrey Pereira Garbe	Brazil	1:07.54	
12	1	2	Malte Braunschweig	Germany	1:08.24	

== Final ==
Rank	Lane	Name	Nationality	Time	Notes
1st place, gold medalist(s)	5	Bogdan Mozgovoi	RPC	1:01.65	PR
2nd place, silver medalist(s)	4	Yahor Shchalkanau	Belarus	1:01.96	
3rd place, bronze medalist(s)	3	Timothy Hodge	Australia	1:02.16	
4	6	Ugo Didier	France	1:02.20	
5	2	Simone Barlaam	Italy	1:02.92	
6	7	Jesse Reynolds	New Zealand	1:04.60	
7	8	Barry McClements	Ireland	1:05.76	
8	1	Brenden Hall	Australia	1:05.90	
