= 2019 World Para Swimming Championships – Men's 100 metre freestyle =

The men's 100m freestyle events at the 2019 World Para Swimming Championships were held in the London Aquatics Centre at the Queen Elizabeth Olympic Park in London between 9–15 September.

== Medalists ==
Event	Gold	Silver	Bronze
S4	Roman Zhdanov; Russia	Takayuki Suzuki; Japan	Jo Giseong; South Korea
S5	Francesco Bocciardo; Italy	Daniel Dias; Brazil	Antoni Ponce Bertran; Spain
S6	Nelson Crispín; Colombia	Antonio Fantin; Italy	Oleksandr Komarov; Ukraine
S7	Carlos Serrano Zárate; Colombia	Bohdan Hrynenko; Ukraine	Andrii Trusov; Ukraine
S8	Dimosthenis Michalentzakis; Greece	Ben Popham; Australia	Yang Guanglong; China
S8	Dimosthenis Michalentzakis; Greece	Ben Popham; Australia	Andrei Nikolaev; Russia
S9	Simone Barlaam; Italy	Denis Tarasov; Russia	Bogdan Mozgovoi; Russia
S10	Maksym Krypak; Ukraine	Stefano Raimondi; Italy	Rowan Crothers; Australia
S11	Hua Dongdong; China	Kirill Belousov; Russia	Wendell Belarmino Pereira; Brazil
S12	Yaroslav Denysenko; Ukraine	Maksym Veraksa; Ukraine	Raman Salei; Azerbaijan
S13	Ihar Boki; Belarus	Islam Aslanov; Uzbekistan	Kyrylo Garashchenko; Ukraine

== Results ==
=== S8 ===
Heats

13 swimmers from 9 nations took part.

Rank	Heat	Name	Nationality	Time	Notes
1	2	Dimosthenis Michalentzakis	Greece	59.54	Q
2	2	Zhou Zhihua	China	59.55	Q
3	1	Ben Popham	Australia	59.67	Q
4	1	Yang Guanglong	China	1:00.75	Q
5	2	Gabriel Cristiano Silva de Sousa	Brazil	1:01.54	Q
6	1	Andrei Nikolaev	Russia	1:01.78	Q
7	2	Michal Golus	Poland	1:02.09	Q
8	1	Inigo Llopis Sanz	Spain	1:02.31	Q
9	2	Luis Armando Andrade Guillen	Mexico	1:02.71	
10	1	Caio Oliveira	Brazil	1:02.74	
11	1	Maxim Borodaev	Russia	1:02.91	
12	2	Blake Cochrane	Australia	1:02.98	
13	2	Joshua Grob	Switzerland	1:04.07	

Final

Rank	Name	Nationality	Time	Notes
1st place, gold medalist(s)	Dimosthenis Michalentzakis	Greece	57.69	
2nd place, silver medalist(s)	Ben Popham	Australia	57.89	
3rd place, bronze medalist(s)	Yang Guanglong	China	58.89	
3rd place, bronze medalist(s)	Andrei Nikolaev	Russia	58.89	
5	Zhou Zhihua	China	58.91	
6	Gabriel Cristiano Silva de Sousa	Brazil	1:01.98	
7	Michal Golus	Poland	1:02.02	
8	Inigo Llopis Sanz	Spain	1:02.58	

=== S9 ===
Heats

24 swimmers of 16 nations took part.

Rank	Heat	Name	Nationality	Time	Notes
1	3	Simone Barlaam	Italy	54.99	Q, CR
2	3	Denis Tarasov	Russia	56.71	Q
3	3	Bogdan Mozgovoi	Russia	57.03	Q
4	2	Timothy Disken	Australia	57.37	Q
5	3	Alexander Skaliukh	Russia	57.39	Q
6	2	Ruiter Silva	Brazil	57.41	Q
6	3	Gino Caetano	Portugal	57.41	Q
8	1	Jose Antonio Mari Alcaraz	Spain	57.44	Q
9	1	Federico Morlacchi	Italy	57.45	
10	1	Simone Ciulli	Italy	57.58	
11	2	Ugo Didier	France	57.67	
12	2	Yahor Shchalkanau	Belarus	58.09	
13	3	Leo Lahteenmaki	Finland	58.20	
14	2	Malte Braunschweig	Germany	58.28	
15	1	Takuro Yamada	Japan	58.40	
16	2	Brenden Hall	Australia	58.58	
17	1	Ariel Enrique Schrenck Martinez	Spain	58.84	
18	2	David Grachat	Portugal	58.91	
19	1	Chris Arbuthnott	New Zealand	58.99	
20	3	Jesse Reynolds	New Zealand	59.70	
21	1	Fernando Ramirez	El Salvador	1:11.77	
22	3	Scody Victor	Mauritius	1:14.05	AF
23	2	Olam Norkham	Laos	1:20.03	
24	1	Bhim Bahadur Kumal	Nepal	1:21.36	

Final

Rank	Name	Nationality	Time	Notes
1st place, gold medalist(s)	Simone Barlaam	Italy	54.10	WR
2nd place, silver medalist(s)	Denis Tarasov	Russia	56.34	
3rd place, bronze medalist(s)	Bogdan Mozgovoi	Russia	56.71	
4	Alexander Skaliukh	Russia	56.80	
5	Timothy Disken	Australia	57.01	
6	Ruiter Silva	Brazil	57.10	
6	Jose Antonio Mari Alcaraz	Spain	57.10	
8	Gino Caetano	Portugal	57.63	
