= 2020 World Para Swimming European Open Championships – Men's 200 metre individual medley =

The men's 200m individual medley events at the 2020 World Para Swimming European Championships were held at the Penteada Olympic Pools Complex.

== Medalists ==
Event	Gold	Silver	Bronze
SM6	Andrei Granichka; Russia	Antoni Ponce Bertran; Spain	Bence Ivan; Hungary
SM7	Yevhenii Bohodaiko; Ukraine	Mark Malyar; Israel	Andrii Trusov; Ukraine
SM8	Denys Dubrov; Ukraine	Carlos Martinez Fernandez; Spain	Andreas Onea; Austria
SM9	Ugo Didier; France	Andrei Kalina; Russia	Federico Morlacchi; Italy
SM10	Maksym Krypak; Ukraine	Stefano Raimondi; Italy	Riccardo Menciotti; Italy
SM11	Mykhailo Serbin; Ukraine	Viktor Smyrnov; Ukraine	Hryhory Zudzilau; Belarus
SM13	Ihar Boki; Belarus	Alex Portal; France	Kyrylo Garashchenko; Ukraine
SM14	Gabriel Bandeira; Brazil	Vasyl Krainyk; Ukraine	Mikhail Kuliabin; Russia

== Results ==
=== SM7 ===
Final

Rank	Name	Nationality	Time	Notes
1st place, gold medalist(s)	Yevhenii Bohodaiko	Ukraine	2:34.43	
2nd place, silver medalist(s)	Mark Malyar	Israel	2:34.79	
3rd place, bronze medalist(s)	Andrii Trusov	Ukraine	2:35.89	
4	Egor Efrosinin	Russia	2:45.84	
5	Marian Kvasnytsia	Ukraine	2:46.13	
6	Sergei Sukharev	Russia	2:48.01	

=== SM10 ===
Heat 1

Rank	Name	Nationality	Time	Notes
1	Maksym Krypak	Ukraine	2:15.26	Q
2	Stefano Raimondi	Ukraine	2:17.36	Q
3	Riccardo Menciotti	Italy	2:20.62	Q
4	Artem Isaev	Russia	2:23.10	Q
5	Alan Ogorzalek	Poland	2:23.44	Q
6	Tadeas Strasik	Czech Republic	2:27.01	Q
7	Jarno Thierens	Belgium	2:33.59	Q
8	Dmitrii Bartasinskii	Russia	2:34.69	Q
9	Rafal Kalinowski	Poland	2:35.11	
—	Sergio Vaquero Ajenjo	Spain	DQ	

Final

Rank	Name	Nationality	Time	Notes
1st place, gold medalist(s)	Maksym Krypak	Ukraine	2:05.89	
2nd place, silver medalist(s)	Stefano Raimondi	Italy	2:08.64	
3rd place, bronze medalist(s)	Riccardo Menciotti	Italy	2:15.16	
4	Artem Isaev	Russia	2:18.48	
5	Alan Ogorzalek	Poland	2:20.78	
6	Jarno Thierens	Belgium	2:32.37	
7	Dmitrii Bartasinskii	Russia	2:42.09	
—	Tadeas Strasik	Czech Republic	DQ	
