= Swimming at the 2024 Summer Paralympics – Men's 100 metre backstroke S9 =

Men's 100 metre backstroke S9 at the XVII Paralympic Games
- Venue: La Défense Arena
- Date: 3 September 2024
- Competitors: 14 from 10 nations
- Winning time: 1:00.76

Medalists
1st place, gold medalist(s)		Yahor Shchalkanau	Neutral Paralympic Athletes
2nd place, silver medalist(s)		Ugo Didier	France
3rd place, bronze medalist(s)		Bogdan Mozgovoi	Neutral Paralympic Athletes

The men's 100 metre backstroke swimming (S9) event at the 2024 Summer Paralympics took place on 3 September 2024, at the La Défense Arena in Paris.

== Records ==
Prior to the competition, the existing world and Paralympic records were as follows.

World Record	Simone Barlaam (ITA)	59.72	Funchal, Portugal	17 June 2022
Paralympic Record	Bogdan Mozgovoi (RPC)	1:01.00	Tokyo, Japan	3 September 2021

== Results ==
=== Heats ===
The heats were started at 09:38.

Rank	Heat	Lane	Name	Nationality	Time	Notes
1	2	4	Yahor Shchalkanau	Neutral Paralympic Athletes	1:01.32	Q
2	1	4	Ugo Didier	France	1:02.89	Q
3	1	5	Timothy Hodge	Australia	1:03.02	Q
4	2	3	Bogdan Mozgovoi	Neutral Paralympic Athletes	1:03.22	Q
5	1	6	Jesse Reynolds	New Zealand	1:04.53	Q
6	1	3	Victor dos Santos Almeida	Brazil	1:04.78	Q
7	2	4	Simone Barlaam	Italy	1:04.81	Q
8	2	6	Barry McClements	Ireland	1:05.36	Q
9	2	2	Jendi Pangabean	Indonesia	1:06.35	
10	2	7	Brenden Hall	Australia	1:06.90	
11	2	1	Igor Hrehorowicz	Poland	1:07.50	
12	1	2	Lucas Mozela	Brazil	1:07.72	
13	1	7	Yurii Bozhynskyi	Ukraine	1:08.90	
14	1	1	Simone Ciulli	Italy	1:09.54	

=== Final ===
The final was held at 17:37.

Rank	Lane	Name	Nationality	Time	Notes
1st place, gold medalist(s)	4	Yahor Shchalkanau	Neutral Paralympic Athletes	1:00.76	PR
2nd place, silver medalist(s)	5	Ugo Didier	France	1:01.48	
3rd place, bronze medalist(s)	6	Bogdan Mozgovoi	Neutral Paralympic Athletes	1:01.93	
4	3	Timothy Hodge	Australia	1:02.52	
5	7	Victor dos Santos Almeida	Brazil	1:03.69	
6	1	Simone Barlaam	Italy	1:03.76	
7	2	Jesse Reynolds	New Zealand	1:04.89	
8	8	Barry McClements	Ireland	1:05.56	
