= 2023 World Para Swimming Championships – Men's 100 metre backstroke =

The men's 100m backstroke events at the 2023 World Para Swimming Championships were held at the Manchester Aquatics Centre between 31 July and 6 August.

== Medalists ==
Event	Gold	Silver	Bronze
S1	Kamil Otowski; Poland	Anton Kol; Ukraine	Francesco Bettella; Italy
S2	Gabriel Araújo; Brazil	Alberto Abarza; Chile	Jacek Czech; Poland
S6	Yang Hong; China	Dino Sinovčić; Croatia	Matías de Andrade; Argentina
S7	Andrii Trusov; Ukraine	Yurii Shenhur; Ukraine	Federico Bicelli; Italy
S8	Iñigo Lloips Sanz; Spain	Kota Kubota; Japan	Sam Downie; Great Britain
S9	Simone Barlaam; Italy	Ugo Didier; France	Timothy Hodge; Australia
S10	Stefano Raimondi; Italy	Riccardo Menciotti; Italy	Ihor Nimchenko; Ukraine
S11	Mykhailo Serbin; Ukraine	Marco Meneses; Portugal	Rogier Dorsman; Netherlands
S12	Stephen Clegg; Great Britain	Raman Salei; Azerbaijan	Douglas Matera; Brazil
S13	Thomas van Wanrooij; Netherlands	Enrique José Alhambra Mollar; Spain	Oleksii Virchenko; Ukraine
S14	Benjamin Hance; Australia	Gabriel Bandeira; Brazil	Alexander Hillhouse; Denmark

== Results ==
=== S1 ===
The applicable records entering the event were as follows:

Record	Swimmer	Time
World record	Hennadii Boiko (Ukraine)	2:08.01
Championship record	Iyad Shalabi (Israel)	2:25.51

Final

The event took place on 2 Aug 2023 at 17:35. Five swimmers entered and the event progressed directly to final.

Rank	Lane	Athlete	Nation	Result	Notes
1st place, gold medalist(s)	4	Kamil Otowski	Poland	2:18.60	
2nd place, silver medalist(s)	5	Anton Kol	Ukraine	2:27.55	
3rd place, bronze medalist(s)	3	Francesco Bettella	Italy	2:30.89	
4	6	Iyad Shalabi	Israel	2:33.53	
5	2	Dimitrios Karypidis	Greece	3:04.90	

=== S2 ===
The applicable records entering the event were as follows:

Record	Swimmer	Time
World record	Liankang Zou (China)	1:45.25
Championship record	Santos Araujo Dos (Brazil)	1:57.69

Final

The event took place on 2 Aug 2023 at 17:42. Seven swimmers entered and the event was treated as a direct final.

Rank	Lane	Athlete	Nation	Result	Notes
1st place, gold medalist(s)	4	Gabriel Araújo	Brazil	1:55.34	
2nd place, silver medalist(s)	5	Alberto Abarza Diaz	Chile	2:06.42	
3rd place, bronze medalist(s)	3	Jacek Czech	Poland	2:07.04	
4	6	Roman Bondarenko	Ukraine	2:13.80	
5	2	C Tronco Sanchez	Mexico	2:17.05	
6	1	Rodrigo Santillan	Peru	2:19.13	
7	7	Conrad Hildebrand	Sweden	2:42.85	

=== S6 ===
The event took place on the morning and evening of 31 July.

Entering the event, the World and championships records were as follows:

Record	Swimmer	Time
World record	(China) Zheng Tao :	1:10.84
Championship record	(China) Zheng Tao :	1:12.94

Heats

Nine swimmers entered the event. The top eight, regardless of heat, advanced to the final.

Rank	Heat	Lane	Name	Nation	Result	Notes
1	2	6	Yang Hong	China	1:16.55	Q
2	1	5	Jia Hongguang	China	1:17.32	Q
3	2	4	Dino Sinovcic	Croatia	1:17.51	Q
4	1	6	Wang Jingang	China	1:18.46	Q
5	1	4	Matias de Andrade	Argentina	1:19.23	Q
6	2	5	Nelson Crispín	Colombia	1:22.12	Q
7	2	3	David Sanchez Sierra	Spain	1:22.13	Q
8	1	3	Daniel Videira	Portugal	1:22.92	Q
9	2	2	Raul Gutierrez	Mexico	1:24.48	

Final

Eight swimmers from six nations took part.

Rank	Name	Nation	Result	Notes
1st place, gold medalist(s)	Yang Hong	China	1:15.17	
2nd place, silver medalist(s)	Dino Sinovčić	Croatia	1:17.71	
3rd place, bronze medalist(s)	Matías de Andrade	Argentina	1:18.74	
4	Wang Jingang	China	1:19.42	
5	Nelson Crispín	Colombia	1:19.87	
6	Jia Hongguang	China	1:20.72	
7	David Sanchez Sierra	Spain	1:20.94	
8	Daniel Videira	Portugal	1:22.79	

=== S7 ===
The applicable records entering the event were as follows:

Record	Swimmer	Time
World record	Andrii Trusov (Ukraine)	1:08.14
Championship record	Bohdan Hrynenko (Ukraine)	1:08.92

Heats

The event took place on 3 Aug 2023 at 10:26. Nine swimmers entered. The highest ranked eight, regardless of heat, progressed to the final

Rank	Heat	Lane	Name	Nation	Result	Notes
1	2	4	Andrii Trusov	Ukraine	1:12.13	Q
1	1	5	Yurii Shenhur	Ukraine	1:12.13	Q
3	2	3	Christian Sadie	South Africa	1:14.10	Q
4	1	4	Federico Bicelli	Italy	1:15.06	Q
5	2	5	Inaki Basiloff	Argentina	1:15.40	Q
6	1	3	Marian Kvasnytsia	Ukraine	1:15.45	Q
7	1	6	Nicolas Poggi	Argentina	1:16.22	Q
8	2	2	Wei Soong Toh	Singapore	1:18.60	Q
9	2	6	Carlos Serrano Zárate	Colombia	1:20.69	

Final

The event took place on 3 Aug 2023 at 20:12.

Rank	Lane	Athlete	Nation	Result	Notes
1st place, gold medalist(s)	5	Andrii Trusov	Ukraine	1:09.37	
2nd place, silver medalist(s)	4	Yurii Shenhur	Ukraine	1:10.67	
3rd place, bronze medalist(s)	6	Federico Bicelli	Italy	1:12.08	
4	3	Christian Sadie	South Africa	1:12.99	
5	2	Inaki Basiloff	Argentina	1:13.37	
6	8	Wei Soong Toh	Singapore	1:14.97	
7	7	Marian Kvasnytsia	Ukraine	1:15.44	
8	1	Nicolas Poggi	Argentina	1:17.45	

=== S8 ===
The applicable records entering the event were as follows:

Record	Swimmer	Time
World record	Robert Griswold (United States)	1:02.55
Championship record	Konstantin Lisenkov (Russia)	1:03.32

Final

The event took place on 3 Aug 2023 at 20:12.

Rank	Lane	Athlete	Nation	Result	Notes
1st place, gold medalist(s)	5	Inigo Llopis Sanz	Spain	1:05.32	
2nd place, silver medalist(s)	4	Kota Kubota	Japan	1:06.40	
3rd place, bronze medalist(s)	2	Sam Downie	Great Britain	1:08.36	
4	6	Mark Malyar	Israel	1:09.17	
5	3	Kotaro Ogiwara	Japan	1:09.39	
6	1	Pipo Carlomagno	Argentina	1:11.08	
7	7	S Martos Minguet	Spain	1:11.31	
8	8	Jurijs Semjonovs	Latvia	1:19.60	

=== S9 ===
The applicable records entering the event were as follows:

Record	Swimmer	Time
World record	Simone Barlaam (Italy)	59.72
Championship record	Simone Barlaam (Italy)	59.72

Heats

10 swimmers entered the competition.

Rank	Lane	Athlete	Nation	Result	Notes "
1	5	Timothy Hodge	Australia	1:01.90	
2	4	Ugo Didier	France	1:02.58	
3	4	Simone Barlaam	Italy	1:04.46	
4	5	Jesse Reynolds	New Zealand	1:04.85	
5	2	Eduard Horodianyn	Ukraine	1:05.52	
6	3	Barry Mcclements	Ireland	1:06.37	
7	3	Jendi Pangabean	Indonesia	1:06.43	
8	6	Brenden Hall	Australia	1:06.80	
9	6	Visser Sam De	Belgium	1:07.56	
10	2	Brun Jacobo Garrido	Spain	1:11.68	

Final

Rank	Lane	Athlete	Nation	Result	Notes "
1	3	Simone Barlaam	Italy	1:00.35	
2	5	Ugo Didier	France	1:00.42	
3	4	Timothy Hodge	Australia	1:02.15	
4	6	Jesse Reynolds	New Zealand	1:04.95	
5	2	Eduard Horodianyn	Ukraine	1:05.69	
6	7	Barry Mcclements	Ireland	1:05.90	
7	8	Brenden Hall	Australia	1:06.35	

=== S11 ===
-->

=== S12 ===
The event took place on the morning and evening of 31 July.

Entering the event, the World and championship records were as follows:

Record	Swimmer	Time
World record	(Russia) A Svetov-Nevolin :	59.35
Championship record	(Ukraine) Yaroslav Denysenko :	59.40

Heats

12 swimmers took part. The Top eight, regardless of heat, progress to the final

Rank	Heat	Lane	Name	Nation	Result	Notes
1	2	4	Stephen Clegg	Great Britain	1:00.01	Q
2	1	4	Raman Salei	Azerbaijan	1:02.26	Q
3	1	5	Martin Alex Villarejo	Spain	1:05.62	Q
4	1	3	Dmytro Sukhanov	Ukraine	1:08.30	Q
5	2	5	Maulana Rifky Yavianda	Indonesia	1:08.39	Q
6	2	3	Douglas Matera	Brazil	1:09.19	Q
7	2	2	Roman Mychka	Ukraine	1:09.69	Q
8	2	7	Jahan Abadi Karimi	Iran	1:10.39	Q
9	2	6	Tamayo Borja Sanz	Spain	1:10.58	
10	1	6	Daniel Giraldo Correa	Colombia	1:10.84	
11	1	2	Roman Potapov	Kazakhstan	1:12.31	
12	1	7	Andrey Afanasyev	Kazakhstan	1:14.66	

Final

Eight swimmers from seven nations took part.

Rank	Name	Nation	Result	Notes
1st place, gold medalist(s)	Stephen Clegg	Great Britain	1:00.13	
2nd place, silver medalist(s)	Raman Salei	Azerbaijan	1:00.83	
3rd place, bronze medalist(s)	Douglas Matera	Brazil	1:04.60	
4	Maulana Rifky Yavianda	Indonesia	1:05.00	
5	Alex Villarejo Martin	Spain	1:05.69	
6	Dmytro Sukhanov	Ukraine	1:06.72	
7	Karimi Jahan Abadi	Iran	1:10.68	
8	Roman Mychka	Ukraine	1:10.68	

=== S14 ===
The event took place on the morning and evening of 1 August.

Entering the event, the World and championship records were as follows:

Record	Swimmer	Time
World record	(Australia) Benjamin Hance :	56.88
Championship record	(Australia) Benjamin Hance :	57.34

Heats

13 swimmers took part. The Top eight, regardless of heat, progress to the final

Rank	Heat	Lane	Name	Nation	Result	Notes
1	2	4	Benjamin Hance	Australia	57.48	Q
2	1	4	Gabriel Bandeira	Brazil	1:00.05	Q
3	2	5	Alexander Hillhouse	Denmark	1:00.41	Q
4	1	5	Jordan Catchpole	Great Britain	1:01.11	Q
5	1	3	Vasyl Krainyk	Ukraine	1:01.44	Q
6	2	3	Ricky Betar	Australia	1:01.81	Q
7	2	6	Louis Lawlor	Great Britain	1:01.84	Q
8	1	6	Lee In-kook	South Korea	1:02.19	Q
9	1	7	Lautaro Maidana	Argentina	1:03.02	
10	1	2	Hui Ka Chun	Hong Kong	1:03.36	
11	2	2	Muhammad Redzuan	Malaysia	1:03.83	
12	2	7	Nicholas Bennett	Canada	1:04.19	
13	2	1	Cameron Vearncombe	Great Britain	1:05.46	

Final

Eight swimmers from seven nations took part.

Rank	Name	Nation	Result	Notes
1st place, gold medalist(s)	Benjamin Hance	Australia	57.26	CR
2nd place, silver medalist(s)	Gabriel Bandeira	Brazil	59.05	
3rd place, bronze medalist(s)	Alexander Hillhouse	Denmark	59.86	
4	Jordan Catchpole	Great Britain	1:00.41	
5	Vasyl Krainyk	Ukraine	1:01.81	
6	Louis Lawlor	Great Britain	1:01.86	
7	Ricky Betar	Australia	1:01.89	
8	Lee In-kook	South Korea	1:02.31	
