= Swimming at the 2020 Summer Paralympics – Men's 100 metre butterfly S9 =

Men's 100 metre butterfly S9 at the XVI Paralympic Games
- Venue: Tokyo Aquatics Centre
- Dates: 2 September 2021
- Competitors: 17 from 11 nations

Medalists
1st place, gold medalist(s)		William Martin	Australia
2nd place, silver medalist(s)		Simone Barlaam	Italy
3rd place, bronze medalist(s)		Alexander Skaliukh	RPC

The men's 100 metre butterfly S9 event at the 2020 Paralympic Games took place on 2 September 2021, at the Tokyo Aquatics Centre.

== Heats ==
The swimmers with the top eight times, regardless of heat, advanced to the final.

Rank	Heat	Lane	Name	Nationality	Time	Notes
1	3	4	William Martin	Australia	58.14	Q, WR
2	2	4	Simone Barlaam	Italy	1:00.71	Q
3	1	5	José Antonio Mari	Spain	1:00.97	Q
4	1	4	Federico Morlacchi	Italy	1:01.42	Q
5	2	5	Alexander Skaliukh	RPC	1:01.54	Q
6	3	5	Timothy Hodge	Australia	1:01.58	Q
7	3	2	Malte Braunschweig	Germany	1:02.10	Q
8	3	3	Yahor Shchalkanau	Belarus	1:02.17	Q
9	2	3	Kristijan Vincetić	Croatia	1:02.68	
10	2	6	Barry McClements	Ireland	1:02.83	
11	1	6	Simone Ciulli	Italy	1:03.25	
12	3	7	Brenden Hall	Australia	1:04.70	
13	3	6	Igor Hrehorowicz	Poland	1:04.71	
14	1	3	Denis Tarasov	RPC	1:05.08	
15	2	2	Jacobo Garrido Brun	Spain	1:05.36	
16	2	7	Jesse Reynolds	New Zealand	1:05.64	
17	1	2	Vanilton Filho	Brazil	1:07.04	

== Final ==
100m butterfly final
Rank	Lane	Name	Nationality	Time	Notes
1st place, gold medalist(s)	4	William Martin	Australia	57.19	WR
2nd place, silver medalist(s)	5	Simone Barlaam	Italy	59.43	
3rd place, bronze medalist(s)	2	Alexander Skaliukh	RPC	1:00.54	
4	6	Federico Morlacchi	Italy	1:00.75	
5	7	Timothy Hodge	Australia	1:01.03	
6	3	José Antonio Mari	Spain	1:01.28	
7	8	Yahor Shchalkanau	Belarus	1:01.38	
8	1	Malte Braunschweig	Germany	1:02.95	
