= Swimming at the 2024 Summer Paralympics – Men's 50 metre freestyle S9 =

Men's 50 metre freestyle S9 at the XVII Paralympic Games
- Venue: La Défense Arena
- Date: 2 September 2024
- Competitors: 19 from 13 nations
- Winning time: 23.90

Medalists
1st place, gold medalist(s)		Simone Barlaam	Italy
2nd place, silver medalist(s)		Denis Tarasov	Neutral Paralympic Athletes
3rd place, bronze medalist(s)		Fredrik Solberg	Norway

The men's 50 metre freestyle swimming (S9) event at the 2024 Summer Paralympics took place on 2 September 2024, at the La Défense Arena in Paris.

== Records ==
Prior to the competition, the existing world and Paralympic records were as follows.

S8 records

World record	Denis Tarasov (RUS)	25.32	Eindhoven, Netherlands	10 August 2014
Paralympic record	Denis Tarasov (RUS)	25.82	London, Great Britain	3 September 2012

S9 records

World record	Simone Barlaam (ITA)	23.96	Manchester, Great Britain	6 August 2023
Paralympic record	Simone Barlaam (ITA)	24.71	Tokyo, Japan	29 August 2021

== Results ==
=== Heats ===
The heats were started at 10:03.

Rank	Heat	Lane	Name	Nationality	Class	Time	Notes
1	3	4	Simone Barlaam	Italy	S9	24.24	Q, PR
2	2	4	Fredrik Solberg	Norway	S9	25.26	Q
3	1	4	Jamal Hill	United States	S9	25.34	Q
4	2	5	Denis Tarasov	Neutral Paralympic Athletes	S9	25.37	Q
5	3	5	Xie Zhili	China	S9	25.48	Q, AS
6	2	6	Ariel Schrenck	Spain	S9	26.01	Q
7	1	5	Bogdan Mozgovoi	Neutral Paralympic Athletes	S9	26.06	Q
8	3	6	Dmytro Vasylenko	Ukraine	S9	26.12	Q
9	3	3	Ugo Didier	France	S9	26.20	
10	1	6	Yahor Shchalkanau	Neutral Paralympic Athletes	S9	26.45	
11	2	2	Hector Denayer	France	S9	26.48	
12	1	3	Simone Ciulli	Italy	S9	26.55	
13	1	2	Malte Braunschweig	Germany	S9	26.56	
14	2	3	Yurii Bozhynskyi	Ukraine	S9	26.63	
15	3	2	José Antonio Mari	Spain	S9	26.83	
16	3	7	Gabriel Cristiano Souza	Brazil	S8	27.24	
17	2	7	Kentreal Kydd	Saint Vincent and the Grenadines	S9	31.45	
18	3	1	Antwahn Boyce-Vaughan	Barbados	S9	34.28	
19	1	7	Bhim Bahadur Kumal	Nepal	S9	35.08	

=== Final ===
The final was held at 17:52.

Rank	Lane	Name	Nationality	Class	Time	Notes
1st place, gold medalist(s)	4	Simone Barlaam	Italy	S9	23.90	WR
2nd place, silver medalist(s)	6	Denis Tarasov	Neutral Paralympic Athletes	S9	25.15	
3rd place, bronze medalist(s)	5	Fredrik Solberg	Norway	S9	25.33	
4	2	Xie Zhili	China	S9	25.56	
5	3	Jamal Hill	United States	S9	25.62	
6	8	Dmytro Vasylenko	Ukraine	S9	25.73	
7	1	Bogdan Mozgovoi	Neutral Paralympic Athletes	S9	25.92	
8	7	Ariel Schrenck	Spain	S9	26.18	
