= 2018 World Para Swimming European Championships – Men's 100 metres backstroke =

The men's 100 metres backstroke at the 2018 World Para Swimming European Championships was held at the National Aquatic Centre in Dublin from 13 to 19 August. 10 classification finals are held in all over this event.

== Medalists ==
Event	Gold		Silver		Bronze	
S2	Jacek Czech (POL)	2:11.36	Aristeidis Makrodimitris (GRE)	2:19.27	Anton Kol (UKR)	2:27.51
S6	Dino Sinovčić (CRO)	1:16.08	Fabian Brune (GER)	1:21.80	Oleksandr Komarov (UKR)	1:22.21
S7	Ievgenii Bogodaiko (UKR)	1:12.52	Federico Becelli (ITA)	1:12.63	Mark Malyar (ISR)	1:13.89
S8	Jurijs Semjonovs (LAT)	1:09.45	Inigo Llopis Sanz (ESP)	1:12.85	Sergio Salvador Martos Minguet (ESP)	1:13.17
S9	Ugo Didier (FRA)	1:03.10 ER	Thijs van den End (NED)	1:05.08	Tamás Tóth (HUN)	1:05.65
S10	Maksym Krypak (UKR)	57.68	Stefano Raimondi (ITA)	59.30	Riccardo Menciotti (ITA)	1:00.35
S11	Vyktor Smyrnov (UKR)	1:09.96	Wojciech Makowski (POL)	1:11.00	Marco Meneses (POR)	1:14.08
S12	Iaroslav Denysenko (UKR)	59.97	Sergii Klippert (UKR)	1:00.25	Stephen Clegg (GBR)	1:01.52
S13	Ihar Boki (BLR)	57.00	Kyrylo Garashchenko (UKR)	1:01.20	Antti Antero Latikka (FIN)	1:02.17
S14	Marc Evers (NED)	1:01.25	Jordan Catchpole (GBR)	1:01.71	Vasyl Krainyk (UKR)	1:01.74
WR world record | AR area record | CR championship record | GR games record | NR national record | OR Olympic record | PB personal best | SB season best | WL world leading (in a given season)

== See also ==
- List of IPC world records in swimming
