= 2019 World Para Swimming Championships – Men's 100 metre backstroke =

The men's 100m backstroke events at the 2019 World Para Swimming Championships were held in the London Aquatics Centre at the Queen Elizabeth Olympic Park in London between 9–15 September.

== Medalists ==
Event	Gold	Silver	Bronze
S2	Alexander Makarov; Russia	Vladimir Danilenko; Russia	Alberto Abarza; Chile
S6	Dino Sinovcic; Croatia	Yang Hong; China	Matias de Andrade; Argentina
S7	Bohdan Hrynenko; Ukraine	Andrei Gladkov; Russia	Pipo Carlomagno; Argentina
S8	Robert Griswold; United States	Jesse Aungles; Australia	Inigo Llopis Sanz; Spain
S9	Simone Barlaam; Italy	Ugo Didier; France	Timothy Hodge; Australia
S10	Maksym Krypak; Ukraine	Stefano Raimondi; Italy	Riccardo Menciotti; Italy
S11	Viktor Smyrnov; Ukraine	Rogier Dorsman; Netherlands	Már Gunnarsson; Iceland
S12	Yaroslav Denysenko; Ukraine	Raman Salei; Azerbaijan	Roman Makarov; Russia
S13	Ihar Boki; Belarus	Nicolas-Guy Turbide; Canada	Oleksii Virchenko; Ukraine
S14	Viacheslav Emeliantsev; Russia	Jordan Catchpole; Great Britain	Louis Lawlor; Great Britain
