= 2018 World Para Swimming European Championships – Men's 100 metres butterfly =

The men's 100 metres butterfly at the 2018 World Para Swimming European Championships was held at the National Aquatic Centre in Dublin from 13–19 August 2018. Seven classification finals were held in all over this event.

== Medalists ==
Event	Gold		Silver		Bronze	
S8	Dimosthenis Michalentzakis (GRE)	1:03.60	Michal Golus (POL)	1:04.47	Andreas Onea (AUT)	1:07.67
S9	Federico Morlacchi (ITA)	1:00.11	Simone Barlaam (ITA)	1:00.76	Jose Antonio Mari Alcaraz (ESP)	1:01.15
S10	Denys Dubrov (UKR)	54.78	Maksym Krypak (UKR)	54.83	Stefano Raimondi (ITA)	55.86
S11	Israel Oliver (ESP)	1:05.44	Viktor Smyrnov (UKR)	1:07.68	Salvatore Urso (ITA)	1:10.95
S12	Dzmitry Salei (BLR)	57.36	Iaroslav Denysenko (UKR)	57.39	Stephen Clegg (GBR)	57.97
S13	Ihar Boki (BLR)	53.95	Alex Portal (FRA)	58.88	Kamil Rzetelski (POL)	1:00.42
S14	Marc Evers (NED)	58.66	Robert Isak Jonsson (ISL)	59.61	Vasyl Krainyk (UKR)	59.91
WR world record | AR area record | CR championship record | GR games record | NR national record | OR Olympic record | PB personal best | SB season best | WL world leading (in a given season)

== See also ==
- List of IPC world records in swimming
