= 2020 World Para Swimming European Open Championships – Men's 100 metre butterfly =

The men's 100m butterfly events at the 2020 World Para Swimming European Championships were held at the Penteada Olympic Pools Complex.

== Medalists ==
| Event | Gold | Silver | Bronze |
|---|---|---|---|
| S8 | Dimosthenis Michalentzakis; Greece | Alberto Amodeo; Italy | Denys Dubrov; Ukraine |
| S9 | Simone Barlaam; Italy | Alexander Skaliukh; Russia | Yahor Shchalkanau; Belarus |
| S10 | Maksym Krypak; Ukraine | Stefano Raimondi; Italy | Dmitry Grigoryev; Russia |
| S11 | Viktor Smyrnov; Ukraine | Jose Ramon Cantero Elvira; Spain | Mykhailo Serbin; Ukraine |
| S12 | Dzmitry Salei; Belarus | Raman Salei; Azerbaijan | Roman Makarov; Russia |
| S13 | Ihar Boki; Belarus | Oleksii Virchenko; Ukraine | Alex Portal; France |
| S14 | Gabriel Bandeira; Brazil | Lauturo Daniel Maidana Cancinos; Argentina | Mikhail Kuliabin; Russia |

== Results ==
=== S13 ===
Heats

| Rank | Heat | Name | Nationality | Time | Notes |
|---|---|---|---|---|---|
| 1 | 2 | Ihar Boki | Belarus | 54.63 | Q |
| 2 | 1 | Oleksii Virchenko | Ukraine | 57.06 | Q |
| 3 | 2 | Alex Portal | France | 57.41 | Q |
| 4 | 1 | Kyrylo Garashchenko | Ukraine | 59.90 | Q |
| 5 | 2 | Roman Agalakov | Kazakhstan | 1:00.79 | Q |
| 6 | 2 | Juan Ferron Gutierrez | Spain | 1:00.84 | Q |
| 7 | 1 | Enrique José Alhambra Mollar | Spain | 1:02.25 | Q |
| 8 | 1 | Taliso Engel | Germany | 1:02.74 | Q |
| 9 | 2 | Gerasimos Lignos | Greece | 1:02.83 | |
| 10 | 1 | Kylian Portal | France | 1:07.13 | |
| 11 | 2 | Adrian Jastrzebski | Poland | 1:10.47 | |

Final

| Rank | Name | Nationality | Time | Notes |
|---|---|---|---|---|
| 1st place, gold medalist(s) | Ihar Boki | Belarus | 53.72 | WR |
| 2nd place, silver medalist(s) | Oleksii Virchenko | Ukraine | 56.38 | |
| 3rd place, bronze medalist(s) | Alex Portal | France | 57.00 | |
| 4 | Kyrylo Garashchenko | Ukraine | 58.23 | |
| 5 | Juan Ferron Gutierrez | Spain | 1:00.64 | |
| 6 | Enrique Juan Alhambra Mollar | Spain | 1:00.78 | |
| 7 | Taliso Engel | Germany | 1:02.04 | |
| 8 | Roman Agalakov | Kazakhstan | 1:03.12 | |
