= Swimming at the 2022 Commonwealth Games – Men's 100 metre backstroke S9 =

Men's 100 metre backstroke S9 at the 2022 Commonwealth Games
- Venue: Sandwell Aquatics Centre
- Dates: 29 July 2022
- Competitors: 8 from 5 nations
- Winning time: 1:01.88

Medalists
gold medal	Timothy Hodge	Australia
silver medal	Jesse Reynolds	New Zealand
bronze medal	Barry McClements	Northern Ireland

The men's 100 metre backstroke S9 event at the 2022 Commonwealth Games was held on 29 July at the Sandwell Aquatics Centre.

== Schedule ==
The schedule is as follows:

All times are British Summer Time (UTC+1)

Date	Time	Round
Friday 29 July 2022	19:48	Final

== Results ==
=== Final ===
Rank	Lane	Name	Nationality	Time	Notes
1st place, gold medalist(s)	4	Timothy Hodge	Australia	1:01.88	GR
2nd place, silver medalist(s)	5	Jesse Reynolds	New Zealand	1:03.65	
3rd place, bronze medalist(s)	2	Barry McClements	Northern Ireland	1:05.09	
4	3	Harrison Vig	Australia	1:05.40	
5	6	Brenden Hall	Australia	1:05.90	
6	7	Samuel Downie	Scotland	1:11.53	
7	1	Joshua Willmer	New Zealand	1:15.80	
8	8	Ashish Kumar Singh	India	1:18.21	
