= Swimming at the 2026 Commonwealth Games – Men's 100 metre backstroke S9 =

Men's 100 metre backstroke S9 at the 2026 Commonwealth Games
- Venue: Tollcross International Swimming Centre
- Dates: 26 July
- Competitors: 8 from 6 nations
- Winning time: 1:03.00

Medalists
gold medal	Timothy Hodge	Australia
silver medal	Barry McClements	Northern Ireland
bronze medal	Harrison Vig	Australia

The men's 100 metre backstroke S9 event at the 2026 Commonwealth Games will be held on 26 July at the Tollcross International Swimming Centre.

== Schedule ==
The schedule is as follows:

All times are British Summer Time (UTC+1)

Date	Time	Round
Sunday 26 July 2026	10:30	Heat
Sunday 26 July 2026	19:00	Final

== Results ==
=== Heat ===
The heat was held on the morning of 26 July 2026.

Heat results
Rank	Lane	Swimmer	Nation	Time	Notes
1	3	Liam Togher (S9)	Australia	1:06.04	Q
2	6	Harrison Vig (S9)	Australia	1:06.28	Q
3	4	Timothy Hodge (S9)	Australia	1:06.40	Q
4	5	Barry McClements (S9)	Northern Ireland	1:07.30	Q
5	7	Sam Downie (S8)	Scotland	1:09.72	Q
6	2	Reid Maxwell (S8)	Canada	1:10.31	Q
7	1	Christian Sadie (S7)	South Africa	1:15.32	Q
8	8	Antwahn Boyce-Vaughan (S9)	Barbados	2:07.56	Q

=== Final ===
The final took place during of the evening of 26 July 2026.

Final results
Rank	Lane	Swimmer	Nation	Time	Notes
1st place, gold medalist(s)	3	Timothy Hodge	Australia	1:03.00	
2nd place, silver medalist(s)	6	Barry McClements	Northern Ireland	1:03.68	
3rd place, bronze medalist(s)	5	Harrison Vig	Australia	1:04.87	
4	4	Liam Togher	Australia	1:05.48	
5	7	Reid Maxwell	Canada	1:08.85	
6	2	Sam Downie	Scotland	1:08.95	
7	1	Christian Sadie	South Africa	1:15.82	
8	8	Antwahn Boyce-Vaughan	Barbados	2:07.22	
