= 2019 World Para Swimming Championships – Men's 200 metre individual medley =

The men's 200m individual medley events at the 2019 World Para Swimming Championships were held in the London Aquatics Centre at the Queen Elizabeth Olympic Park in London between 9–15 September.

== Medalists ==
Event	Gold	Silver	Bronze
SM6	Andrei Granichka; Russia	Wang Jingang; China	Nelson Crispín; Colombia
SM7	Carlos Serrano Zárate; Colombia	Mark Malyar; Israel	Andrii Trusov; Ukraine
SM8	Robert Griswold; United States	Yang Guanglong; China	Jesse Aungles; Australia
SM9	Andrei Kalina; Russia	Federico Morlacchi; Italy	Timothy Hodge; Australia
SM10	Maksym Krypak; Ukraine	Stefano Raimondi; Italy	Bas Takken; Netherlands
SM11	Rogier Dorsman; Netherlands	Keiichi Kimura; Japan	Viktor Smyrnov; Ukraine
SM13	Ihar Boki; Belarus	Alex Portal; France	Kyrylo Garashchenko; Ukraine
SM14	Dai Tokairin; Japan	Reece Dunn; Great Britain	Vasyl Krainyk; Ukraine
