= 2020 World Para Swimming European Open Championships – Women's 100 metre butterfly =

The women's 100m butterfly events at the 2020 World Para Swimming European Open Championships were held at the Penteada Olympic Pools Complex.

== Medalists ==
| Event | Gold | Silver | Bronze |
|---|---|---|---|
| S9 | Zsofia Konkoly; Hungary | Sarai Gascon; Spain | Viktoriia Ishchiulova; Russia |
| S10 | Alessia Scortechini; Italy | Oliwia Jablonska; Poland | Isabel Yinghua Hernandez Santos; Spain |
| S13 | Carlotta Gilli; Italy | Daria Pikalova; Russia | Alessia Berra; Italy |
| S14 | Jessica-Jane Applegate; Great Britain | Janina Falk; Austria | Janina Breuer; Germany |

== Results ==
=== S13 ===
Final

| Rank | Name | Nationality | Time | Notes |
|---|---|---|---|---|
| 1st place, gold medalist(s) | Carlotta Gilli | Italy | 1:03.71 | |
| 2nd place, silver medalist(s) | Daria Pikalova | Russia | 1:05.33 | |
| 3rd place, bronze medalist(s) | Alessia Berra | Italy | 1:05.83 | |
| 4 | Joanna Mendak | Poland | 1:09.74 | |
| 5 | Ariadna Edo Beltrán | Spain | 1:10.64 | |
| 6 | Róisín Ní Ríain | Ireland | 1:11.25 | |
| 7 | Marlene Endrolath | Germany | 1:14.66 | |
