= 2020 World Para Swimming European Open Championships =

- Host city: Funchal, Portugal
- Date: 16–22 May 2021
- Venue: Penteada Olympic Pools Complex
- Nations participating: 46
- Athletes participating: 371

The 2020 World Para Swimming European Open Championships took place in Funchal, Portugal from 16 to 22 May 2021. It was the sixth edition of the championships. The event was postponed in 2020 due to COVID-19 pandemic.

== Schedule ==
158 scheduled events took place.

Date →		Sun 16 May	Mon 17 May	Tues 18 May	Wed 19 May	Thurs 20 May	Fri 21 May	Sat 22 May
50m freestyle	Men; Details	S5; S10; S11		S12		S4; S6; S8; S13	S3; S7	S9
50m freestyle	Women; Details	S5; S10; S11		S12		S4; S6; S8; S13	S7	S9
100m freestyle	Men; Details		S4; S6	S13	S8; S9	S11; S12	S10; S14	S5; S7
100m freestyle	Women; Details		S4; S6	S13	S8; S9	S11; S12	S10; S14	S5; S7
200m freestyle	Men; Details	S14			S2		S4; S5	S3
200m freestyle	Women; Details	S14					S5	
400m freestyle	Men; Details	S8	S7	S10	S6	S9	S13	S11
400m freestyle	Women; Details	S8	S7	S10	S6	S9	S13	
50m backstroke	Men; Details		S5		S3; S4	S1		S3
50m backstroke	Women; Details		S5		S3; S4		S9; S11	
100m backstroke	Men; Details	S6; S12	S8; S14	S1; S2	S7; S13		S9; S11	S10
100m backstroke	Women; Details	S6; S12	S8; S14		S7; S13			S10
50m breaststroke	Men; Details	SB2; SB3						
50m breaststroke	Women; Details	SB3						
100m breaststroke	Men; Details	SB4; SB9	SB13	SB7; SB11; SB14	SB12	SB5	SB6	SB8
100m breaststroke	Women; Details	SB4; SB9	SB13	SB7; SB11; SB14	SB12	SB5; SB6	SB8	
50m butterfly	Men; Details	S13		S5		S7		S6
50m butterfly	Women; Details	S13		S5		S7		S6
100m butterfly	Men; Details	S13	S11; S12	S8; S9		S10		S14
100m butterfly	Women; Details			S9		S10		S14
150m individual medley	Men; Details			SM4				
150m individual medley	Women; Details			SM4				
200m individual medley	Men; Details	SM7	SM9; SM10	SM6	SM11	SM14	SM8	SM13
200m individual medley	Women; Details	SM7	SM9; SM10	SM6		SM14	SM8	SM13
Medley relay	Details		Mixed 4x50m (20pts); Mixed 4 × 100 m (S14)		Mixed 4 × 100 m (49pts)	Men's 4 × 100 m (34pts); Women's 4 × 100 m (34pts)		
Freestyle relay	Details			Mixed 4x50m (20pts)	Mixed 4 × 100 m (S14)		Mixed 4 × 100 m (49pts)	Men's 4 × 100 m (34pts); Women's 4 × 100 m (34pts)

== Medal table ==
After Day 7

Host nation

Rank	Nation	Gold	Silver	Bronze	Total
1	Italy	34	26	20	80
2	Ukraine	33	32	28	93
3	Russia	25	26	32	83
4	Spain	11	17	20	48
5	Hungary	9	2	2	13
6	Belarus	7	3	9	19
7	Brazil	6	1	0	7
8	Israel	5	4	3	12
9	Great Britain	5	0	3	8
10	Greece	4	1	2	7
11	Germany	3	9	9	21
12	France	3	7	4	14
13	Azerbaijan	3	1	0	4
14	Lithuania	3	0	0	3
15	Switzerland	2	2	1	5
16	Chile	2	2	0	4
17	Sweden	1	4	3	8
18	Portugal*	1	1	1	3
19	Kazakhstan	1	0	0	1
20	Poland	0	5	5	10
21	Turkey	0	3	3	6
22	Austria	0	2	3	5
22	Ireland	0	2	3	5
24	Cuba	0	1	1	2
24	Estonia	0	1	1	2
26	Argentina	0	1	0	1
26	Croatia	0	1	0	1
26	Cyprus	0	1	0	1
26	Czech Republic	0	1	0	1
26	Slovakia	0	1	0	1
31	Denmark	0	0	1	1
31	Norway	0	0	1	1
Totals (32 entries)		158	157	155	470

=== Broken records ===
Event	Round	Name	Nation	Time	Date
Men's 100m butterfly S13	Final	Ihar Boki	Belarus	53.72 WR, ER	16 May
Women's 100m backstroke S6	Final	Nora Meister	Switzerland	1:21.78 ER	16 May
Men's 200m freestyle S14	Final	Gabriel Bandeira	Brazil	1:55.37 AM	16 May
Women's 200m individual medley SM7	Final	Giulia Terzi	Italy	3:08.12 ER	16 May
Men's 100m freestyle S6	Heat 2	Antonio Fantin	Italy	1:04.01 WR, ER	17 May
Men's 100m freestyle S6	Final	Antonio Fantin	Italy	1:03.76 WR, ER	17 May
Men's 100m backstroke S14	Heat 2	Gabriel Bandeira	Brazil	1:02.23 AM	17 May
Men's 100m freestyle S4	Final	Ami Omer Dadaon	Israel	1:19.77 WR, ER	17 May
Women's 100m freestyle S3	Final	Arjola Trimi	Italy	1:31.46 ER	17 May
Men's 200m individual medley SM9	Final	Ugo Didier	France	2:16.04 ER	17 May
Men's 150m individual medley SM4	Final	Roman Zhdanov	Russia	2:22.38 WR, ER	18 May
Men's 100m breaststroke SB14	Final	Gabriel Bandeira	Brazil	1:06.31 AM	18 May
Women's 100m backstroke S13	Final	Carlotta Gilli	Italy	1:05.56 WR, ER	19 May
Men's 100m freestyle S9	Final	Simone Barlaam	Italy	53.03 WR, ER	19 May
Men's 100m breaststroke SB5	Final	Antoni Ponce Bertran	Spain	1:25.46 WR, ER	20 May
Women's 50m freestyle S3	Final	Arjola Trimi	Italy	41.15 WR, ER	20 May
Men's 50m freestyle S4	Final	Ami Omer Dadaon	Israel	37.60 ER	20 May
Men's 50m butterfly S7	Final	Andrii Trusov	Ukraine	29.33 ER	20 May
Women's 50m butterfly S7	Final	Giulia Terzi	Italy	34.95 ER	20 May
Men's 50m freestyle S6	Final	Antonio Fantin	Italy	29.11 ER	20 May
Men's 200m individual medley SM14	Final	Gabriel Bandeira	Brazil	2:10.92 AM	20 May
Men's 100m backstroke S9	Final	Bogdan Mozgovoi	Russia	1:01.16 WR, ER	20 May
Men's 100m freestyle S14	Final	Gabriel Bandeira	Brazil	51.60 AM	21 May
Men's 200m freestyle S4	Final	Ami Omer Dadaon	Israel	2:51.80 WR, ER	21 May
Men's 100m breaststroke SB8	Final	Vicente Enrique Almonacid Heyl	Chile	1:09.83 AM	22 May
Women's 100m freestyle S7	Final	Giulia Terzi	Italy	1:10.48 ER	22 May
Women's 50m freestyle S9	Final	Susana Veiga	Portugal	28,85 ER	22 May
Men's 100m butterfly S14	Final	Gabriel Bandeira	Brazil	54.99 AM	22 May
Men's 4 × 100 m freestyle relay 34pts	Final	Stefano Raimondi; Antonio Fantin; Federico Morlacchi; Simone Barlaam	Italy	3:46.06 WR, ER	22 May

== Participating nations ==
The championships served as a qualifier for the 2020 Summer Paralympics. Not only were there European countries competing, some South American and Asian countries also took part because the games were an open championship.

- Argentina (1)
- Austria (4)
- Azerbaijan (2)
- Belarus (11)
- Belgium (5)
- Bosnia and Herzegovina (1)
- Brazil (3)
- Chile (2)
- Croatia (8)
- Cuba (2)
- Cyprus (1)
- Czech Republic (11)
- Denmark (2)
- Estonia (3)
- Finland (5)
- France (16)
- Georgia (2)
- Germany (16)
- Great Britain (9)
- Greece (15)
- Hungary (10)
- Iceland (2)
- Ireland (5)
- Israel (9)
- Italy (29)
- Kazakhstan (6)
- Latvia (1)
- Lithuania (3)
- Malta (1)
- Moldova (3)
- Montenegro (1)
- Norway (3)
- Peru (2)
- Poland (15)
- Portugal (8)
- Refugee Para Team (1)
- Romania (2)
- Russia (43)
- Slovakia (4)
- Slovenia (1)
- South Korea (1)
- Spain (41)
- Sweden (8)
- Switzerland (4)
- Turkey (7)
- Ukraine (43)
- Venezuela (1)

== See also ==
- 2020 European Aquatics Championships
- 2020 World Para Athletics European Championships held in Bydgoszcz, Poland.
