= Matías de Andrade =

Argentine Paralympic swimmer

Personal information
- Nickname: Matute
- Born: 22 April 1993 (age 33) Mar del Plata, Argentina
- Height: 1.46 m (4 ft 9 in)

Sport
- Country: Argentina
- Sport: Paralympic swimming
- Disability class: S6
Medal record
Paralympic swimming
Representing Argentina
Paralympic Games
Silver medal – second place	2020 Tokyo	100 m backstroke S6
World Championships
Silver medal – second place	2017 Mexico City	100m backstroke S7
Silver medal – second place	2022 Madeira	100m backstroke S6
Bronze medal – third place	2019 London	100m backstroke S6
Bronze medal – third place	2023 Manchester	100m backstroke S6
Parapan American Games
Gold medal – first place	2019 Lima	100m backstroke S6
Silver medal – second place	2011 Guadalajara	100m backstroke S7
Silver medal – second place	2015 Toronto	100m backstroke S7
Silver medal – second place	2019 Lima	4x100m medley relay

Matías de Andrade (born 22 April 1993) is an Argentine Paralympic swimmer who specialises in backstroke swimming and competes in international elite events. He is a two-time World Para Swimming Championships medalist and a Parapan American Games champion.

== Career ==
De Andrade has competed at the 2012 and 2016 Summer Paralympics, and is qualified to compete at the 2020 Summer Paralympics.
