= Andreas Onea =

Austrian Paralympic swimmer (born 1992)

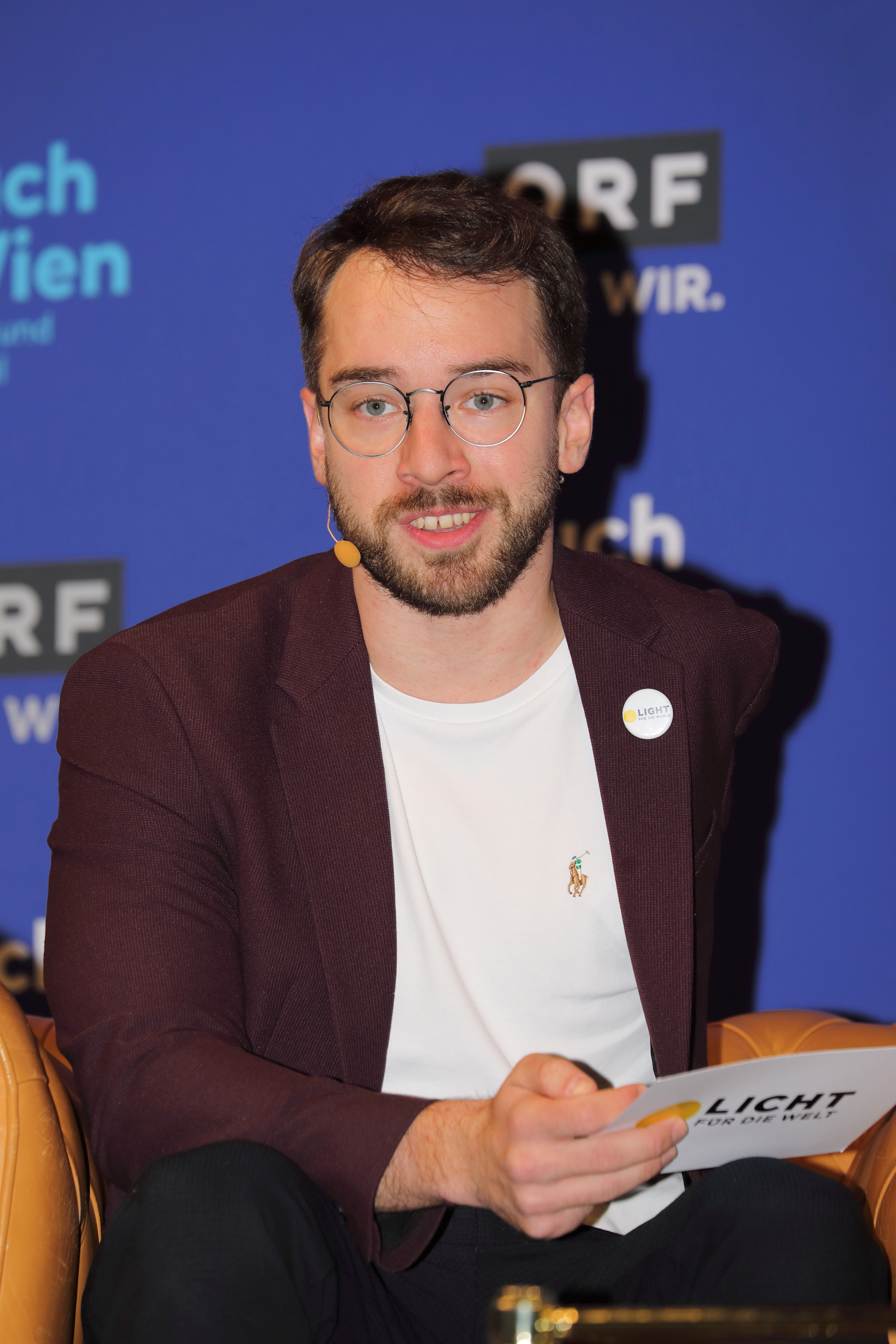
- Onea in 2023

Personal information
- Full name: Andreas Daniel Onea
- Born: 9 July 1992 (age 33) Zwettl, Austria

Sport
- Country: Austria
- Sport: Paralympic swimming
Medal record
Men's para swimming
Representing Austria
Paralympic Games
Bronze medal – third place	2016 Rio de Janeiro	100 m breaststroke SB8
World Championships
Bronze medal – third place	2022 Madeira	100 m breaststroke SB8
European Championships
Silver medal – second place	2016 Funchal	100 m breaststroke SB8
Silver medal – second place	2016 Funchal	200 m individual medley SB8
Silver medal – second place	2018 Dublin	200 m individual medley S8
Bronze medal – third place	2018 Dublin	100 m butterfly S8

Andreas Daniel Onea (born 9 July 1992) is an Austrian Paralympic swimmer. He represented Austria at the Summer Paralympics in 2012, 2016 and 2020. In 2016, he won the bronze medal in the men's 100 metre breaststroke SB8 event.

== Career ==
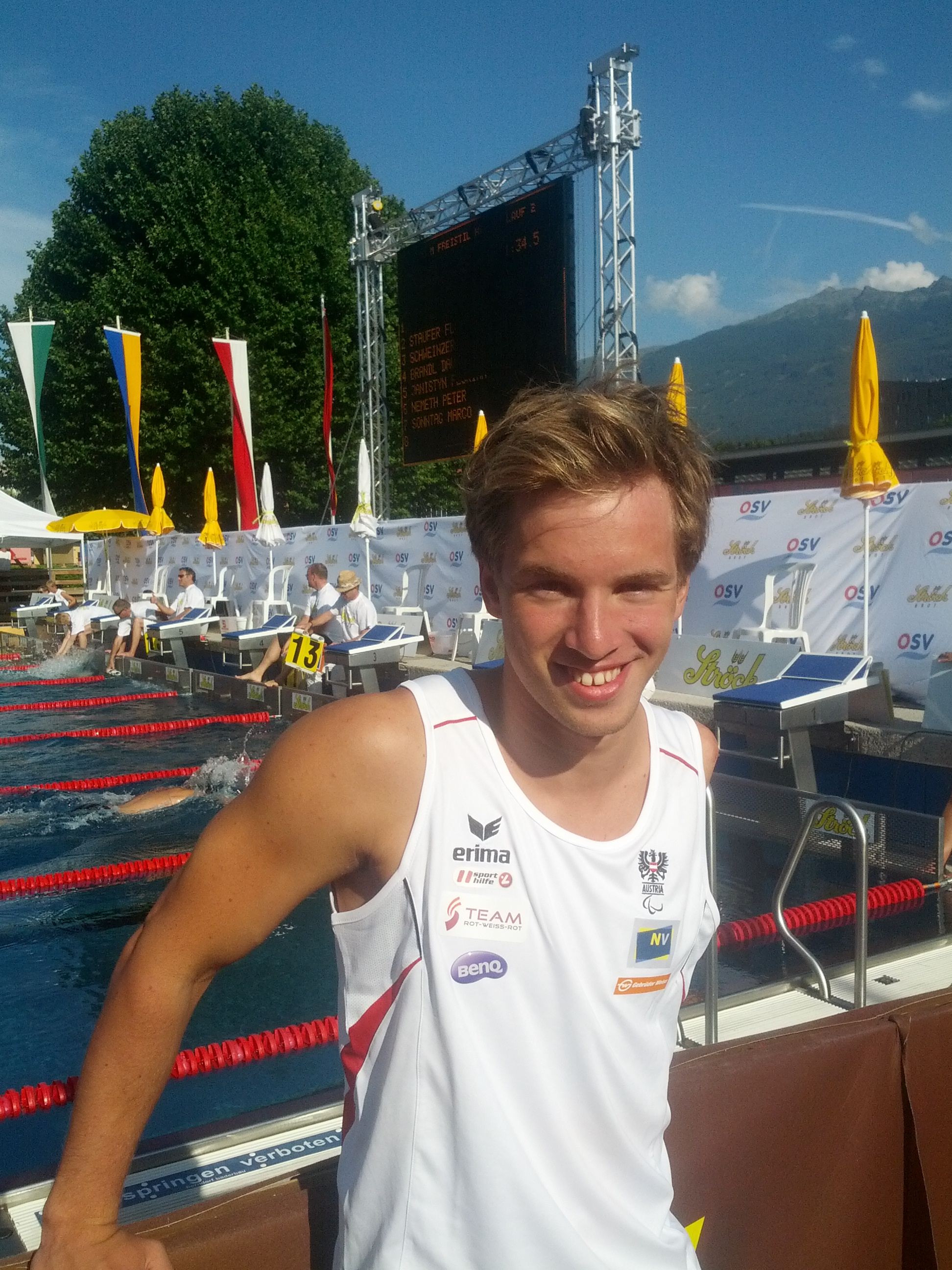
Onea in 2012

At the 2013 World Championships, he won the silver medal in the men's 100 metre breaststroke SB8 event. Two years later, at the 2015 World Championships, he won the bronze medal in the same event. At the 2016 IPC Swimming European Championships he won a silver medal in the men's 100m breaststroke SB8 and a bronze medal in the 200m individual medley SB8 event.

At the 2018 World Para Swimming European Championships he won a bronze medal in the men's 100 metres butterfly S8 event and a silver medal in the men's 200 metres individual medley S8 event.

In 2021, he represented Austria at the 2020 Summer Paralympics.

== Personal life ==
His left arm got amputated after injuries sustained in a car accident.
