= Louis Lawlor =

British para swimmer born 2002

Personal information
- Born: May 25, 2002 (age 24) Glasgow, Scotland

Sport
- Country: United Kingdom
- Sport: Para swimming
- Disability class: S14, SB14 and SM14
- Coach: Danielle Brayson
Medal record
Representing United Kingdom
Men's para swimming
World Championships
Bronze medal – third place	2019 London	Men's 100 metre backstroke S14

Louis Lawlor (born 25 May 2002) is a British para swimmer who competes in S14, SB14 and SM14 classifications events for athletes with intellectual impairments. He represented Great Britain at the 2020 Summer Paralympics and 2024 Summer Paralympics. He won a bronze medal in the Men's 100 metre backstroke S14 at the 2019 World Para Swimming Championships.

== Early and personal life ==
Louis Lawlor was born on 25 May 2002 in Glasgow, Scotland. He trains with the City of Glasgow Swim Team under coach Danielle Brayson. He competes in the S14, SB14 and SM14 classifications for swimmers with intellectual impairments. Lawlor identifies as LGBTQ.

== Career ==
Lawlor started competing in para swimming events in 2018 and achieved two podium finishes at the 2018 British Para-Swimming International Meet held in Sheffield. He won a silver in the 100m butterfly and bronze in the 200m freestyle event. He was also named as the Best Swimmer at the 2018 Scottish Junior Learning Disability Swimming Championships.

Lawlor finished fourth in the mixed category race at the British Para-Swimming International Meet in 2019 which earned him a place in the Great Britain team for the 2019 World Para Swimming Championships in London. He won a bronze medal in the men's 100 metre backstroke S14 at the World Championships, the first major international medal of his career. He set a Scottish record time of 54.34 seconds in the 100m freestyle event in 2019.

Lawlor made his Paralympic debut at the 2020 Summer Paralympics in Tokyo. He competed in the men's 100 metre backstroke S14 event and advanced to the final. He came last in the final, and was ranked eighth amongst the 18 competitors in the overall standings. At the 2022 World Para Swimming Championships in Madeira, Lawlor competed in the men's 100 metre backstroke S14 and 200 metre individual medley SM14 events, and recorded sixth and ninth-place finishes respectively.

In 2024, Lawlor was selected to represent the Great Britain team at the 2024 Summer Paralympics in Paris. He competed in the men's 100 metre backstroke S14 event. He advanced through the qualifying round and finished seventh in the final.
