= Fredrik Solberg =

Norwegian para-swimmer (born 2001)

Personal information
- Born: 13 December 2001 (age 24) Oslo, Norway

Sport
- Country: Norway
- Sport: Swimming
- Classifications: S9
Medal record
Men's para-swimming
Representing Norway
Paralympic Games
Bronze medal – third place	2024 Paris	50 m freestyle S9
World Championships
Silver medal – second place	2022 Madeira	50 m freestyle S9
Silver medal – second place	2023 Manchester	50 m freestyle S9
Bronze medal – third place	2025 Singapore	50 m freestyle S9

Fredrik Solberg (born 13 December 2001) is a Norwegian para-swimmer. He competed for Norway at the 2024 Summer Paralympics, winning a bronze medal in the 50 m freestyle S9.

== Career ==
He also won silver medals in the same event at the 2022 and 2023 World Para Swimming Championships.

Solberg also competed for Norway at the 2020 Summer Paralympics, where he finished fifth in the 50 m freestyle S9 and eightth in the 100 m breaststroke SB9.
