= Kamil Otowski =

Polish Paralympic swimmer

Medal record

Men's para-swimming

Representing Poland

Paralympic Games
Gold medal – first place	2024 Paris	50 m backstroke S1
Gold medal – first place	2024 Paris	100 m backstroke S1

World Championships
Gold medal – first place	2023 Manchester	50 m backstroke S1
Gold medal – first place	2023 Manchester	100 m backstroke S1
Bronze medal – third place	2022 Madeira	200 m freestyle S2

Kamil Otowski (born 29 October 1999) is a Polish swimmer, who won gold in the 100 metre backstroke S1 at the 2024 Summer Paralympics in Paris.
