= Barry McClements =

Swimmer from Northern Ireland

Personal information
- Nationality: Irish
- Born: 6 December 2001 (age 24) Dundonald, County Down, Northern Ireland
- Home town: Ards
- Height: 179 cm (5 ft 10 in)
- Weight: 69 kg (152 lb)

Sport
- Country: Ireland / Northern Ireland (Commonwealth Games)
- Sport: Para swimming
- Disability class: S9, SB8, SM9; S10
- Events: backstroke, butterfly, freestyle, individual medley
- Club: Ards Swimming Club
- Coached by: Davy Johnston
Medal record
Representing Ireland
European Championships
| Bronze medal – third place | 2024 Funchal | 100 m butterfly S9 |
Representing Northern Ireland
Commonwealth Games
| Silver medal – second place | 2026 Glasgow | 100 m backstroke S9 |
| Bronze medal – third place | 2022 Birmingham | 100 m backstroke S9 |

Barry McClements (born 6 December 2001) is a para swimmer from Ards, Northern Ireland.

== Early life ==
McClements was born with fibular hemimelia, where part of the fibula is missing; his right leg was amputated above the knee at 10 months old, and he competes in the disability class S9, SB8, SM9.

== Career ==
McClements represented Ireland at the 2020 Summer Paralympics, his best finish being seventh place in the 100 metre backstroke S9.

He won a bronze medal at the 2022 Commonwealth Games, at the 100 m backstroke S9 event, become the first Northern Irish medallist in swimming at the Commonwealth Games.

McClements won a bronze medal at the Para Swimming European Championships 2024 from lane 8 in the S9 100m Butterfly.

McClements won Silver finishing second behind Timothy Hodge of Australia in the 100m Backstroke S9 at the 2026 Commonwealth Games in Glasgow.
