= Bogdan Mozgovoi =

Russian Paralympic swimmer

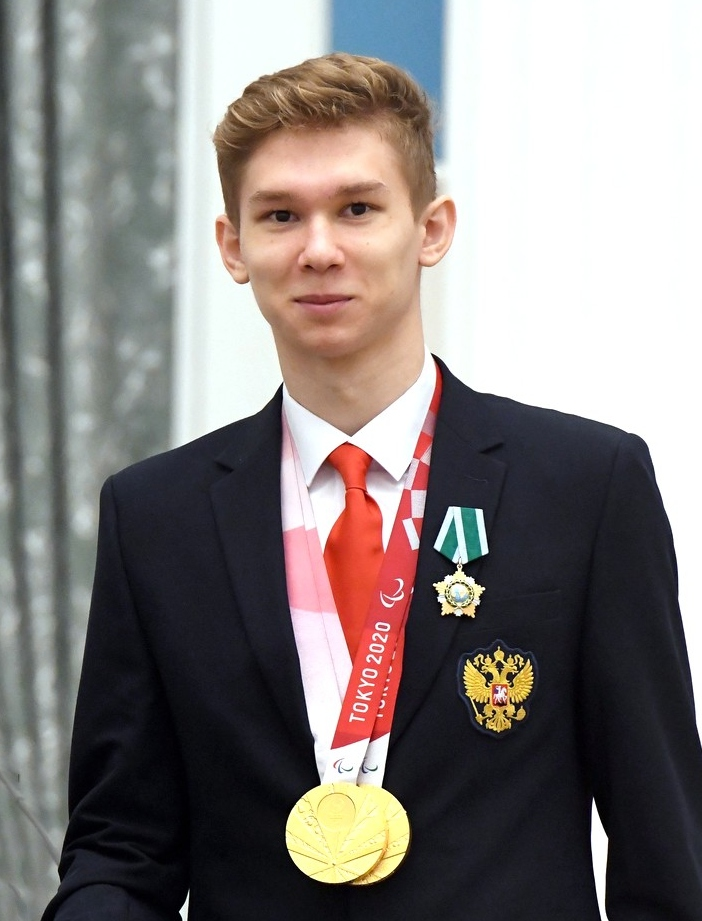
- Mozgovoi in 2021

Personal information
- Full name: Bogdan Olegovich Mozgovoi
- Nationality: Russian
- Born: 29 October 2000 (age 25) Ufa, Russia
- Education: Ural State University of Physical Education

Sport
- Sport: Paralympic swimming
- Disability class: S9
- Coached by: Sergey Trukhachev
Medal record
Paralympic swimming
Representing RPC
Paralympic Games
Gold medal – first place	2020 Tokyo	100 m backstroke S9
Gold medal – first place	2020 Tokyo	4 × 100 m medley relay 34pts
Representing Neutral Paralympic Athletes
Paralympic Games
Bronze medal – third place	2024 Paris	100 m backstroke S9
World Championships
Silver medal – second place	2025 Singapore	100 m backstroke S9
European Championships
Bronze medal – third place	2024 Madeira	50 m freestyle S9
Bronze medal – third place	2024 Madeira	100 m freestyle S9
Bronze medal – third place	2024 Madeira	100 m backstroke S9
Representing Russia
World Championships
Gold medal – first place	2019 London	4x100 m medley relay 34pts
Bronze medal – third place	2019 London	100 m freestyle S9
European Championships
Gold medal – first place	2026 Kocaeli	100 m backstroke S9
Bronze medal – third place	2020 Funchal	50 m freestyle S9
Bronze medal – third place	2020 Funchal	100 m freestyle S9
Bronze medal – third place	2026 Kocaeli	200 m ind. medley SM9

Bogdan Olegovich Mozgovoi (Russian: Богдан Олегович Мозговой; born 29 October 2000) is a Russian Paralympic swimmer. He represented Russian Paralympic Committee athletes at the 2020 Summer Paralympics.

== Career ==
Mozgovoi represented Russian Paralympic Committee athletes at the 2020 Summer Paralympics where he won gold medals in the 100 metre breaststroke S9 event and men's 4 × 100 metre medley relay 34pts event.

He represented Neutral Paralympic Athletes at the 2024 Summer Paralympics and won a bronze medal in the 100 metre backstroke S9 event. He also finished in fourth place in the 200 metre individual medley SM9 and seventh place in the 50 metre freestyle S9 event.

== Personal life ==
His father is Oleg Valeryevich, and his mother is Raisa Raisovna.
