= Dino Sinovčić =

Croatian Paralympic swimmer

Personal information
- Born: 16 June 1992 (age 34) Split, Croatia
- Height: 1.78 m (5 ft 10 in)

Sport
- Country: Croatia
- Sport: Paralympic swimming
- Disability: Arthrogryposis
- Disability class: S6
- Club: PK Mornar
Medal record
Paralympic swimming
Representing Croatia
Paralympic Games
Bronze medal – third place	2020 Tokyo	100 m backstroke S6
Bronze medal – third place	2024 Paris	100 m backstroke S6
World Championships
Gold medal – first place	2019 London	100m backstroke S6
Gold medal – first place	2022 Madeira	100m backstroke S6
Silver medal – second place	2023 Manchester	100m backstroke S6
Silver medal – second place	2025 Singapore	100 m backstroke S6
European Championships
Silver medal – second place	2020 Funchal	100m backstroke S6
Gold medal – first place	2018 Dublin	100m backstroke S6
Bronze medal – third place	2009 Reykjavik	100m backstroke S7
Bronze medal – third place	2026 Kocaeli	100m backstroke S6

Dino Sinovčić (born 16 June 1992) is a Croatian Paralympic swimmer who competes in international elite events. He is a World and European champion in backstroke swimming.
