= Michał Golus =

Polish swimmer (born 1996)

Personal information
- Nationality: Poland
- Born: 10 January 1996 (age 30) Radom, Poland

Sport
- Sport: Swimming
- Strokes: Freestyle, butterfly and individual medley
- Club: MKS Wodnik Radom
- Coach: Marcin Cieslik, Wojciech Seidel
Medal record
Men's para swimming
Representing Poland
World Championships
Bronze medal – third place	2022 Madeira	50 m freestyle S8
European Championships
Gold medal – first place	2018 Dublin	50 m freestyle S8
Gold medal – first place	2018 Dublin	100 m freestyle S8
Silver medal – second place	2018 Dublin	100 m butterfly S8

Michał Golus (born 10 January 1996) is a swimmer from Poland who competes in Paralympic S8 and SM8 (individual medley) events. At the 2018 World Para Swimming European Championships in Dublin, he won the 50 and 100 meter freestyle titles in the S8 category.

== Career history ==
Golus began swimming in 2012, and first raced international at the 2017 World Para Swimming Championships.

Golus came to international attention winning two titles at the 2018 European championships, along with the silver medal in the 100 meter butterfly at the same meet.

== Personal life ==
Golus is a graduate in Computer Science from the University of Technology and Humanities in Radom, Poland.
