= Jarno Thierens =

Belgian Paralympic cyclist (born 1998)

Personal information
- National team: Belgium
- Born: 26 October 1998 (age 27) Sint-Niklaas, Flanders, Belgium

Sport
- Sport: Para swimming para-cycling
- Disability class: S10, SB9, SM10 (Swimming); C4 (Cycling)
Medal record
Men's para-cycling
Representing Belgium
Track World Championships
Silver medal – second place	2025 Rio de Janeiro	Sprint C4
Bronze medal – third place	2025 Rio de Janeiro	1 km time trial C4

Jarno Thierens (born 26 October 1998) is a Belgian road and track cyclist who competes in para-cycling and a former para swimmer.

== Career ==
In early 2011, Thierens was hit by a car while cycling, resulting in the loss of his right foot. In 2012, he started swimming at the DIWI swimming club. Thierens has been active in cycling since the fall of 2021. In 2022, he retired from swimming due to a shoulder injury and focused on cycling.
