= Marco Meneses =

Portuguese para swimmer (born 2001)

Personal information
- Nationality: Portuguese
- Born: 15 March 2001 (age 25)

Sport
- Sport: Para swimming
- Disability class: S11, SM11
Medal record
Men's para swimming
Representing Portugal
World Championships
Silver medal – second place	2023 Manchester	100 m backstroke S11
Bronze medal – third place	2022 Madeira	100 m backstroke S11
Bronze medal – third place	2025 Singapore	400 m freestyle S11
European Championships
Silver medal – second place	2024 Funchal	100 m backstroke S11
Silver medal – second place	2026 Kocaeli	400 m freestyle S11
Bronze medal – third place	2018 Dublin	100 m backstroke S11

Marco Meneses (born 15 March 2001) is a Portuguese para swimmer who represented Portugal at the 2020 and 2024 Summer Paralympics

== Career ==
Meneses represented Portugal at the 2020 and 2024 Summer Paralympics. He competed at the 2024 World Para Swimming European Open Championships and won a silver medal in the 100 metre backstroke S11 event. He competed at the 2025 World Para Swimming Championships and won a bronze medal in the 400 metre freestyle S11 event. He also competed in the 200 metre individual medley SM11 event and set a Portuguese record with a time of 2:35.49.
