= Kamil Rzetelski =

Polish Paralympic swimmer

Personal information
- Full name: Kamil Wiktor Rzetelski
- Born: 12 September 1996 (age 29) Kiełczówek, Poland

Sport
- Country: Poland
- Sport: Paralympic swimming
- Disability: Visual impairment
- Disability class: S13
Medal record
Paralympic swimming
Representing Poland
World Championships
| Silver medal – second place | 2017 Mexico City | Men's 50m freestyle S13 |
| Bronze medal – third place | 2017 Mexico City | Men's 100m freestyle S13 |
European Championships
| Bronze medal – third place | 2018 Dublin | Men's 50m freestyle S13 |
| Bronze medal – third place | 2018 Dublin | Men's 100m butterfly S13 |

Kamil Wiktor Rzetelski (born 12 September 1996) is a Polish visually impaired Paralympic swimmer who competes in international level events. He is a double World medalist and a double European bronze medalist, he has competed for Poland at the 2016 Summer Paralympics where he did not medal in any of his events.
