= Timothy Hodge =

Australian Paralympic swimmer (born 2001)

Timothy Hodge OAM
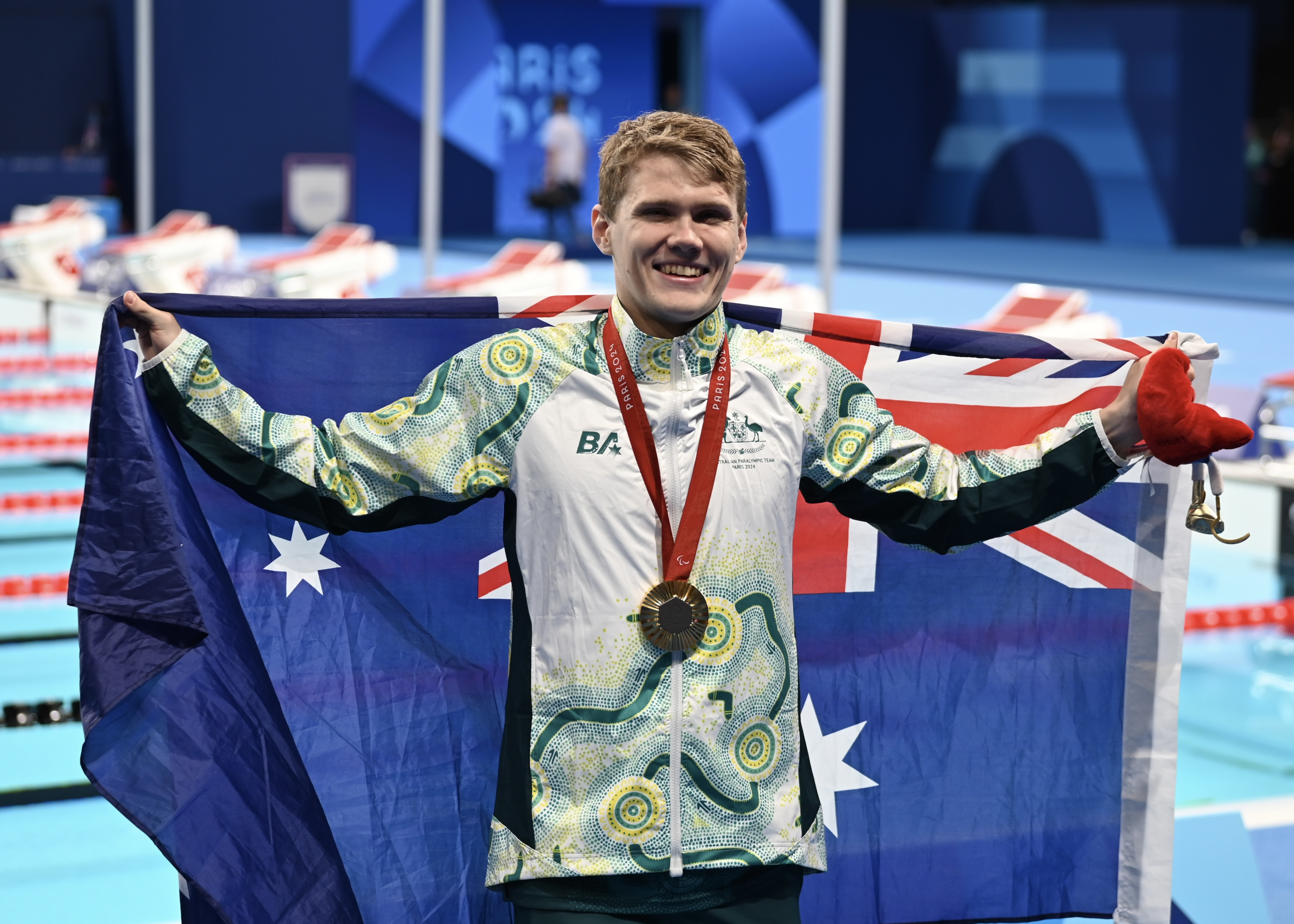
- Hodge at the 2024 Summer Paralympics

Personal information
- Full name: Timothy Hodge
- Nationality: Australian
- Born: 31 January 2001 (age 25) Blacktown, New South Wales

Sport
- Sport: Swimming
- Classifications: S9
- Club: ACU Blacktown
- Coach: Misha Payne
Medal record
Men's para swimming
Representing Australia
Paralympic Games
Gold medal – first place	2024 Paris	200 m medley SM9
Gold medal – first place	2024 Paris	Mixed 4×100 m medley relay 34pts
Silver medal – second place	2020 Tokyo	200 m medley SM9
Silver medal – second place	2020 Tokyo	4×100 m medley 34 pts
Silver medal – second place	2024 Paris	100 m butterfly S9
Bronze medal – third place	2020 Tokyo	100 m backstroke S9
World Championships
Gold medal – first place	2022 Madeira	200 m medley S9
Gold medal – first place	2022 Madeira	Mixed 4 × 100 m medley relay 34 pts
Gold medal – first place	2023 Manchester	200 m medley SM9
Gold medal – first place	2025 Singapore	200 m medley SM9
Silver medal – second place	2023 Manchester	100 m butterfly S9
Silver medal – second place	2025 Singapore	100 m butterfly S9
Bronze medal – third place	2019 London	100 m backstroke S9
Bronze medal – third place	2019 London	200 m medley SM9
Bronze medal – third place	2022 Madeira	100 m backstroke S9
Bronze medal – third place	2023 Manchester	100 m backstroke S9
Bronze medal – third place	2025 Singapore	Mixed 4×100 m medley relay 34pts
Commonwealth Games
Gold medal – first place	2022 Birmingham	100 m backstroke S9
Gold medal – first place	2026 Glasgow	100 m backstroke s9
Silver medal – second place	2018 Gold Coast	100 m breaststroke SB7
Silver medal – second place	2022 Birmingham	100 m breaststroke SB8
Bronze medal – third place	2026 Glasgow	100 m breaststroke SB9

Timothy Hodge OAM (born 31 January 2001) is an Australian Paralympic swimmer. He has represented Australia at the 2016, 2020, and 2024 Summer Paralympics, where he won two gold, three silver and one bronze medals.

== Personal ==
Hodge was born on 31 January 2001 in Blacktown, New South Wales. He lost his right foot when he was four due to lower-leg deficiency. In addition, he is missing two fingers on his right hand and his right arm is shorter than his left. He attended Patrician Brothers' College, Blacktown. In 2024, he is studying electrical engineering at Western Sydney University and working as an undergraduate engineer.

Hodge believes that he can inspire those with a similar disability by stating "To inspire someone who might have just gone through their operation to amputate their foot or arm, or people who were born with their condition and have had issues all their life – to inspire them to start their own journey and set their own goals and achieve what they want to achieve in their lives is incredibly important."

== Career ==
Hodge swims in the S9 classification (SB8). Hodge competed at the 2015 IPC World Championships in Glasgow, where, at 14 years, he was the second youngest member of the Australian team. Hodge set his best individual time in 100m Backstroke (S9) finishing 8th.

At the 2016 Rio Paralympic Games, Hodge competed in five events. He placed fifth in the Men's 200m Individual Medley SM9 and sixth in the Men's 100m Backstroke S9. He didn't progress to the finals in Men's 100m Butterfly SB9, Men's 400m Freestyle S9 and Men's 100m Freestyle S9.

Hodge had succeeded in his aim to compete at the Paralympics, whether at Rio or Tokyo. He said, "If I can just push myself hard and get to the Paralympics, that’d be the greatest thing." He is a member of ACU Blacktown Swim Team in Sydney and is coached by Misha Payne.

Hodge won a silver medal in the 100m Breaststroke SB7 in the 2018 Commonwealth Games on the Gold Coast, Queensland, where he swam his personal best thus far.

At the 2019 Australian Swimming Championships, Hodge set a new world record to take gold in the Men's 50m Backstroke Multi-Class race.

At the 2019 World Para Swimming Championships in London, Hodge won bronze medals in the Men's 100m Backstroke S9 and Men's 200m Individual Medley SM9.

At the 2020 Summer Paralympics in Tokyo, Hodge won a silver medal in the Men's 200 m individual medley SM9 with a time of 2:15.42. In the Men's 4x100m Medley 34 pts, he swam together with Timothy Disken, Ben Popham, and William Martin. His team won the silver medal in a time of 4:07.70, just over a second behind the winners, RPC, who set a new world record. Hodge also won a bronze medal in the Men's 100 m backstroke S9 with a time of 1:02.16.

At the 2022 World Para Swimming Championships, Madeira, Hodge won three medals - gold in the Men's 200m Individual Medley SM9 and Mixed 4 × 100 m medley relay S14 and bronze in the Men's 100m Backstroke S9

At the 2022 Commonwealth Games in Birmingham, Hodge won the gold medal in the Men's 100m Backstroke S9 and silver medal in the Men's 100 Breaststroke SB8. At the 2023 World Para Swimming Championships, Manchester, England, he won three medals - gold in the Men's 200 m medley SM9, silver in the Men's 100 m butterfly S9 and bronze in the 100 m backstroke S9.

Hodge broke his world record in the Men's 200m medley SB9 at the 2024 Australian Paralympic Swimming Trials with a time of 2:12.03.

At the 2024 Paris Paralympics, he won two gold medals - Men's 200 m individual medley SM9 and Mixed 4 x 100 m medley 34 pts. He won the silver medal in the Men's1 00 m butterfly S9, finished fourth in the Men's 400 m freestyle S9 and Men's 100 m backstroke S9 and fifth in the Men's 100 m breaststroke SB9. His results led to Hodge being awarded Swimming Australia's Paralympic Program Swimmer of the Year.

At the 2025 World Para Swimming Championships in Singapore, he won the gold medal in Men's 200 m Individual Medley, silver medal in the Men's 100 m butterfly and bronze medal in the Mixed 4 x 100 m medley 34 pts.

== Recognition ==
- 2011 – Young Citizen of the Year in Blacktown, NSW, Australia.
- 2018 – Sport NSW Young Athlete of the Year with a Disability
- 2019 – Sportsperson of the Year at the Blacktown City Sports Awards
- 2021 – Sport NSW Young Athlete of the Year with a Disability supported by Variety, the Children's Charity NSW/ACT
- 2024 - Swimming Australia Paralympic Program Swimmer
- 2024 - New South Wales Institute of Sport Male Athlete of the Year
- 2025 - Medal of the Order of Australia (OAM) for service to sport as a gold medallist at the Paris Paralympic Games 2024.
