= Yahor Shchalkanau =

Belarusian Paralympic swimmer

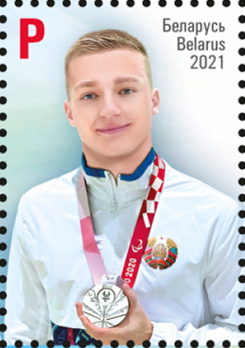
- Shchalkanau on a 2021 stamp of Belarus

Personal information
- Native name: Ягор Пятровіч Шчалканаў
- Full name: Yahor Pyatrovich Shchalkanau
- Nationality: Belarusian
- Born: 11 June 2001 (age 25) Brest, Belarus
- Height: 1.82 m (6 ft 0 in)

Sport
- Sport: Paralympic swimming
- Disability class: S9, SM9
- Coached by: Gennady Vishnyakov& Stanislau Pazdzeyeu
Medal record
Paralympic swimming
Representing Belarus
Paralympic Games
Silver medal – second place	2020 Tokyo	100 m backstroke S9
European Championships
Bronze medal – third place	2020 Funchal	100 m butterfly S9
Bronze medal – third place	2020 Funchal	100 m backstroke S9
Bronze medal – third place	2026 Kocaeli	100 m freestyle S9
Bronze medal – third place	2026 Kocaeli	100 m backstroke S9
Representing Neutral Paralympic Athletes
Paralympic Games
Gold medal – first place	2024 Paris	100 m backstroke S9
World Championships
Gold medal – first place	2025 Singapore	100 m backstroke S9
European Championships
Silver medal – second place	2024 Funchal	100 m backstroke S7

Yahor Shchalkanau (Belarusian: Ягор Шчалканаў, born 11 June 2001 in Brest) is a Belarusian Paralympic swimmer. He won a silver medal in the 100 m breaststroke S9 event at the 2020 Summer Paralympics.
