= Vasyl Krainyk =

Ukrainian Paralympic swimmer

Personal information
- Nationality: Ukrainian
- Born: 7 June 1996 (age 30) Donetsk, Ukraine

Sport
- Sport: Paralympic swimming
- Disability class: S14, SM14, SB14
Medal record
Men's para swimming
Representing Ukraine
Paralympic Games
Silver medal – second place	2020 Tokyo	200 m ind. medley SM14
World Championships
Bronze medal – third place	2019 London	200 m ind. medley SM14
European Championships
Gold medal – first place	2018 Dublin	200 m ind. medley S14
Bronze medal – third place	2018 Dublin	100 m backstroke S14
Bronze medal – third place	2018 Dublin	100 m butterfly S14
Bronze medal – third place	2026 Kocaeli	100 m backstroke S14

Vasyl Krainyk (born 7 June 1996) is a Ukrainian Paralympic swimmer. He represented Ukraine at the 2020 Summer Paralympics.

== Career ==
Krainyk represented Ukraine in the men's 200 metre individual medley SM14 event at the 2020 Summer Paralympics and won a bronze medal.
