= Ugo Didier =

French Paralympic swimmer (born 2001)

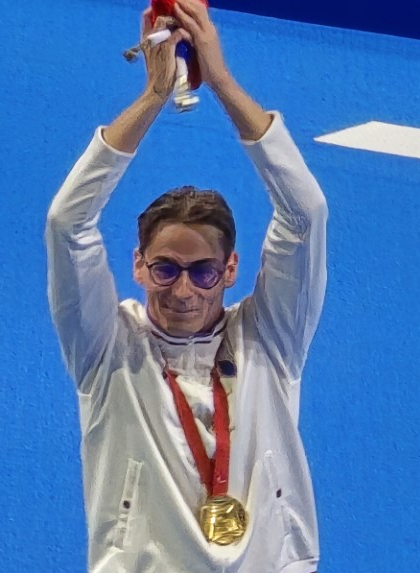
- Didier at the 2024 Summer Paralympics

Personal information
- Born: 11 September 2001 (age 24) Le Chesnay, France

Sport
- Country: France
- Sport: Para swimming
- Disability class: S9
Medal record
Para swimming
Representing France
Paralympic Games
| Gold medal – first place | 2024 Paris | 400 m freestyle S9 |
| Silver medal – second place | 2020 Tokyo | 400 m freestyle S9 |
| Silver medal – second place | 2024 Paris | 100 m backstroke S9 |
| Silver medal – second place | 2024 Paris | 200 m medley SM9 |
| Bronze medal – third place | 2020 Tokyo | 200 m medley SM9 |
World Championships
| Gold medal – first place | 2017 Mexico City | 100 m backstroke S9 |
| Silver medal – second place | 2019 London | 100 m backstroke S9 |
| Silver medal – second place | 2022 Madeira | 200 m medley SM9 |
| Silver medal – second place | 2022 Madeira | 100 m freestyle S9 |
| Silver medal – second place | 2022 Madeira | 400 m freestyle S9 |
| Silver medal – second place | 2022 Madeira | 100 m backstroke S9 |
| Silver medal – second place | 2023 Manchester | 100 m freestyle S9 |
| Silver medal – second place | 2023 Manchester | 400 m freestyle S9 |
| Silver medal – second place | 2023 Manchester | 100m backstroke S9 |
| Silver medal – second place | 2023 Manchester | 200 m medley SM9 |
| Bronze medal – third place | 2019 London | 400 m freestyle S9 |
| Bronze medal – third place | 2023 Manchester | 50 m freestyle S9 |
| Bronze medal – third place | 2025 Singapore | 200 m medley SM9 |
| Bronze medal – third place | 2025 Singapore | 100 m freestyle S9 |
| Bronze medal – third place | 2025 Singapore | 100 m backstroke S9 |
European Championships
| Gold medal – first place | 2018 Dublin | 100 m backstroke S9 |
| Silver medal – second place | 2018 Dublin | 200 m medley S9 |
| Silver medal – second place | 2020 Funchal | 100 m freestyle S9 |

Ugo Didier (born 11 September 2001) is a French para swimmer. He represented France at the 2020 and 2024 Summer Paralympics.

== Career ==
Didier made his international debut for France at the 2017 World Para Swimming Championships at the age of 14.

He represented France at the 2020 Summer Paralympics and won a silver medal in the 400 metre freestyle S9 event, and a bronze medal in the 200 metre individual medley SM9 event.

He again represented France at the 2024 Summer Paralympics and won a gold medal in the 400 metre freestyle S9 event, France's first gold medal of the 2024 Paralympics. He also won silver medals in the 400 metre freestyle S9 and 200 metre individual medley SM9 events.

== Personal life ==
Didier was born with club feet and weakness in both legs. His younger brother, Lucas, is a para table tennis player for France.
