= Bohdan Hrynenko =

Ukrainian Paralympic swimmer

Personal information
- Born: 29 May 1995 (age 31)

Sport
- Country: Ukraine
- Sport: Paralympic swimming
Medal record
Paralympic Games
Gold medal – first place	2016 Rio de Janeiro	4 × 100 m freestyle relay 34pts
Silver medal – second place	2016 Rio de Janeiro	50 m freestyle S8
World Para Swimming Championships
Gold medal – first place	2019 London	100 m backstroke S7
Silver medal – second place	2019 London	100 m freestyle S7

Bohdan Hrynenko (born 29 May 1995) is a Ukrainian Paralympic swimmer. He represented Ukraine at the 2016 Summer Paralympics held in Rio de Janeiro, Brazil and he won the silver medal in the men's 50 m freestyle S8 event. He also won the gold medal in the men's 4 × 100 metre freestyle relay 34pts event together with Oleksandr Komarov, Maksym Krypak and Denys Dubrov.

At the 2019 World Para Swimming Championships held in London, United Kingdom, he won the gold medal and he set a new world record in the men's 100m backstroke S7 event. He also won the silver medal in the men's 100m freestyle S7 event.
