= Riccardo Menciotti =

Italian Paralympic swimmer (born 1994)

Personal information
- National team: Italy
- Born: 7 April 1994 (age 32) Terni, Italy
- Life partner: Alessia Scortechini

Sport
- Sport: Paralympic swimming
- Disability: Limb deficiency
- Disability class: S10, SB9, SM10
- Club: Canottieri Aniene
Medal record
Paralympic swimming
Representing Italy
Paralympic Games
Bronze medal – third place	2020 Tokyo	4x100 m medley relay 34pts
World Championships
Silver medal – second place	2022 Madeira	100m backstroke S10
Silver medal – second place	2023 Manchester	100m backstroke S10

Riccardo Menciotti (born 28 September 1994) is an Italian Paralympic swimmer who won a bronze medal at 2020 Summer Paralympics.
