= Jesse Reynolds =

New Zealand para-swimmer

Personal information
- Born: 2 October 1996 (age 29) Waikato, New Zealand

Sport
- Sport: Swimming
- Classifications: S9, SB8, SM9
- Coach: Simon Mayne
Medal record
Men's para swimming
Representing New Zealand
Commonwealth Games
Silver medal – second place	2022 Birmingham	100 m backstroke S9
- Updated on 30 July 2022

Jesse Reynolds (born 2 October 1996) is a New Zealand para-swimmer who represented his country at the 2016 Summer Paralympics, the 2018 Commonwealth Games and the 2020 Summer Paralympics. He also competed at the 2013 and 2015 IPC Swimming World Championships.
