= Simone Barlaam =

Italian Paralympic swimmer (born 2000)

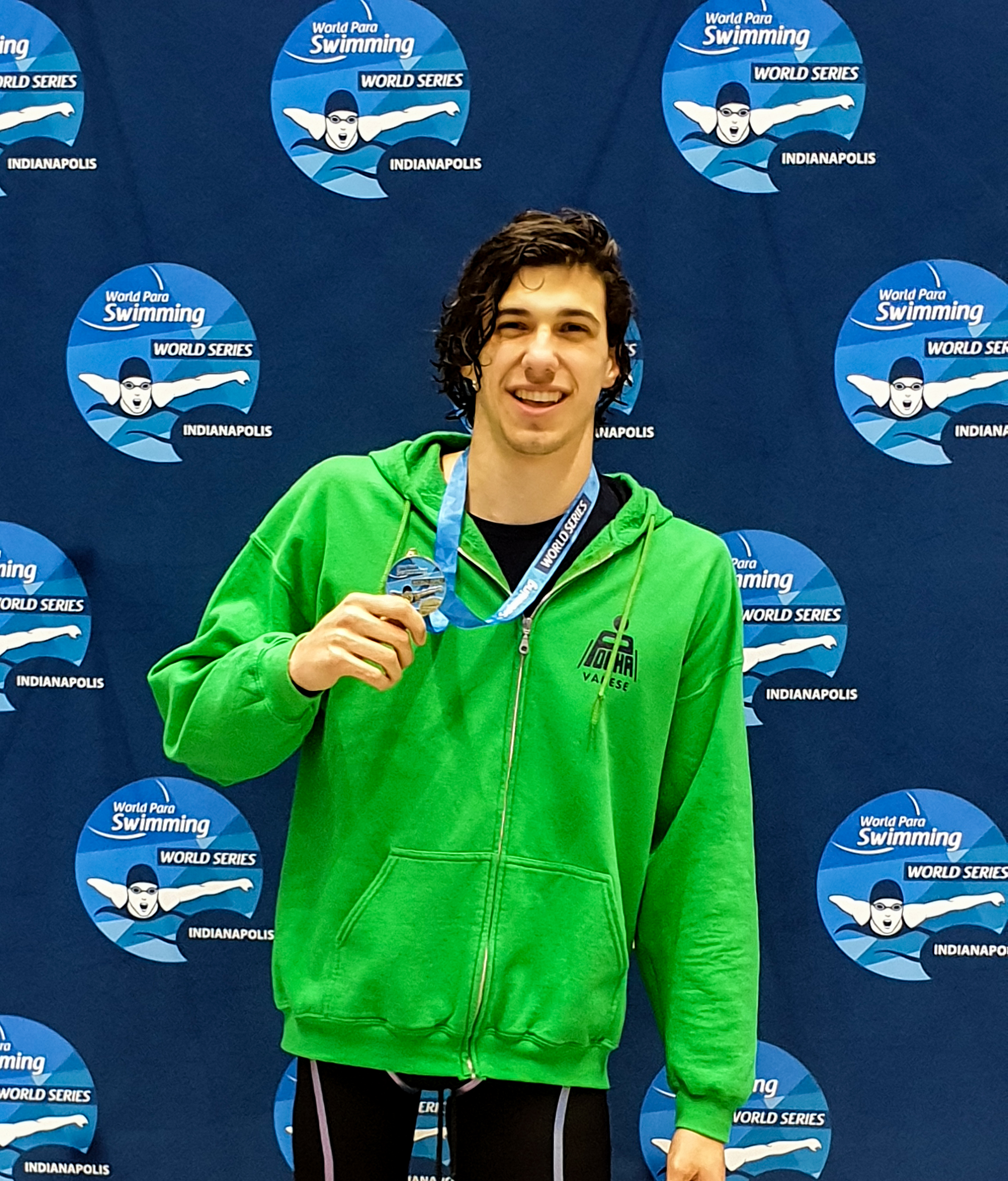
- Barlaam in 2019

Personal information
- Nationality: Italian
- Born: 12 July 2000 (age 26) Milan, Italy
- Height: 1.93 m (6 ft 4 in)

Sport
- Country: Italy
- Sport: Paralympic swimming
- Disability: Congenital hypoplasia
- Disability class: S9
- Club: Polha Varese
Medal record
Paralympic swimming
Representing Italy
Event	1st	2nd	3rd
Paralympics	4	3	1
World Championships	21	2	1
European Championships	8	2	1
Total	33	7	3
Paralympic Games
Gold medal – first place	2020 Tokyo	50m freestyle S9
Gold medal – first place	2024 Paris	50 m freestyle S9
Gold medal – first place	2024 Paris	100 m butterfly S9
Gold medal – first place	2024 Paris	Mixed 4×100 m freestyle relay 34pts
Silver medal – second place	2020 Tokyo	100m butterfly S9
Silver medal – second place	2020 Tokyo	4×100 m freestyle 34 pts
Silver medal – second place	2024 Paris	400 m freestyle S9
Bronze medal – third place	2020 Tokyo	4x100 m medley relay
World Championships
Gold medal – first place	2017 Mexico City	50m freestyle S9
Gold medal – first place	2017 Mexico City	100m freestyle S9
Gold medal – first place	2019 London	50m freestyle S9
Gold medal – first place	2019 London	100m freestyle S9
Gold medal – first place	2019 London	100m backstroke S9
Gold medal – first place	2019 London	100m butterfly S9
Gold medal – first place	2019 London	4x100m freestyle relay
Gold medal – first place	2022 Madeira	100m butterfly S9
Gold medal – first place	2022 Madeira	50m freestyle S9
Gold medal – first place	2022 Madeira	100m freestyle S9
Gold medal – first place	2022 Madeira	400m freestyle S9
Gold medal – first place	2022 Madeira	100m backstroke S9
Gold medal – first place	2023 Manchester	100m butterfly S9
Gold medal – first place	2023 Manchester	50m freestyle S9
Gold medal – first place	2023 Manchester	100m freestyle S9
Gold medal – first place	2023 Manchester	400m freestyle S9
Gold medal – first place	2023 Manchester	100m backstroke S9
Gold medal – first place	2025 Singapore	100m butterfly S9
Gold medal – first place	2025 Singapore	50m freestyle S9
Gold medal – first place	2025 Singapore	100m freestyle S9
Gold medal – first place	2025 Singapore	400m freestyle S9
Silver medal – second place	2017 Mexico City	4x100m freestyle relay
Silver medal – second place	2019 London	4x100m medley relay
Bronze medal – third place	2017 Mexico City	100m backstroke S9
European Championships
Gold medal – first place	2018 Dublin	50m freestyle S9
Gold medal – first place	2018 Dublin	100m freestyle S9
Gold medal – first place	2018 Dublin	4x100m freestyle relay
Gold medal – first place	2018 Dublin	4x100m medley relay
Silver medal – second place	2018 Dublin	100m butterfly S9

Simone Barlaam (born 12 July 2000) is an Italian Paralympic swimmer who competes in international level events. He is a thirteen time World champion and eight time European champion. He competed at the 2020 Summer Paralympics, winning a gold medal.

== Personal life ==
Barlaam was born with a coxa vara and congenital hypoplasia in his right femur which means that his right leg doesn't develop resulting in his right leg shorter than his left leg. Coxa vara was caused by doctors who performed a podalic version procedure while he was in utero but his leg broke which doctors knew nothing about. During his childhood, he went through thirteen surgeries to correct his right leg.

== Swimming career ==
Barlaam began Paralympic swimming when he was fifteen years old and won his first medals at the 2017 World Para Swimming Championships in Mexico City. He swims and trains with other able-bodied swimmers.

At the World Para Swimming Championships in Singapore, Barlaam secured a “golden hat-trick” by winning three gold medals, including the men’s 400 m freestyle S9 with a time of 4:13.33.
