= Swimming at the 2020 Summer Paralympics – Men's 100 metre freestyle S8 =

Men's 100 metre freestyle S8 at the XVI Paralympic Games
- Venue: Tokyo Aquatics Centre
- Dates: 25 August 2021
- Competitors: 18

Medalists
1st place, gold medalist(s)		Ben Popham	Australia
2nd place, silver medalist(s)		Andrei Nikolaev	RPC
3rd place, bronze medalist(s)		Dimosthenis Michalentzakis	Greece

The Men's 100 metre freestyle S8 event at the 2020 Paralympic Games took place on 25 August 2021, at the Tokyo Aquatics Centre.

== Heats ==
The swimmers with the top 8 times, regardless of heat, advanced to the final.

Rank	Heat	Lane	Name	Nationality	Time	Notes
1	3	4	Ben Popham	Australia	58.95	Q
2	2	4	Dimosthenis Michalentzakis	Greece	59.49	Q
3	1	6	Denys Dubrov	Ukraine	59.70	Q
4	1	4	Andrei Nikolaev	RPC	59.80	Q
5	2	5	Xu Haijiao	China	1:00.05	Q
6	1	5	Alberta Amodeo	Italy	1:00.08	Q
7	3	5	Yang Guanglong	China	1:00.40	Q
8	3	2	Luis Armando Andrade Guillen	Mexico	1:01.21	Q
9	1	2	Michal Golus	Poland	1:01.26	
10	2	7	Matthew Torres	United States	1:01.35	
11	1	3	Federico Bicelli	Italy	1:01.37	
12	3	7	Liu Fengqi	China	1:01.54	
13	3	6	Kataro Ogiwara	Japan	1:01.59	
14	2	3	Inigo Llopis Sanz	Spain	1:01.95	
15	3	3	Gabriel Cristiano Silva de Souza	Brazil	1:02.30	
16	2	2	Kota Kubota	Japan	1:02.97	
17	2	6	Caio Amorim Muniz de Oliveira	Brazil	1:03.04	
18	1	7	Andrei Gladkov	RPC	1:07.33	

== Final ==
100m freestyle final
Rank	Lane	Name	Nationality	Time	Notes
1st place, gold medalist(s)	4	Ben Popham	Australia	57.37	
2nd place, silver medalist(s)	6	Andrei Nikolaev	RPC	57.69	
3rd place, bronze medalist(s)	5	Dimosthenis Michalentzakis	Greece	58.73	
4	2	Xu Haijiao	China	58.75	
5	3	Denys Dubrov	Ukraine	59.02	
6	1	Yang Guanglong	China	59.42	
7	7	Alberto Amodeo	Italy	59.93	
8	8	Luis Armando Andrade Guillen	Mexico	1:01.23	
