= Swimming at the 2020 Summer Paralympics – Men's 4 × 100 metre medley relay 34pts =

Men's 4 × 100 metre medley relay - 34 points at the XVI Paralympic Games
- Venue: Tokyo Aquatics Centre
- Dates: 3 September 2021
- Competitors: from 9 nations

Medalists
1st place, gold medalist(s)		RPC (RPC)
2nd place, silver medalist(s)		Australia (AUS)
3rd place, bronze medalist(s)		Italy (ITA)

The men's 4 × 100 metre medley relay - 34 points swimming events for the 2020 Summer Paralympics took place at the Tokyo Aquatics Centre on 3 September 2021.

== Competition format ==
Relay teams are based on a point score. The sport class of an individual swimmer is worth the actual number value i.e. sport class S6 is worth six points, sport class S12 is worth twelve points, and so on. The total of all the competitors must add up to 34 points or less.

== Heats ==
The teams with the top eight times, regardless of heat, advanced to the final.

Rank	Heat	Lane	Swimmers	Nation	Time	Notes
1	2	4	Andrei Gladkov (S7); Daniil Smirnov (SB8); Dmitry Grigoryev (S10); Denis Tarasov (S9)	RPC	4:18.70	Q
2	1	3	Querijn Hensen (S10); Tim van Duuren (SB8); Bas Takken (S10); Thijs van Hofweegen (S6)	Netherlands	4:19.68	Q
3	2	3	Timothy Hodge (S9); Blake Cochrane (SB7); William Martin (S9); Ben Popham (S8)	Australia	4:21.45	Q
4	1	4	Riccardo Menciotti (S10); Federico Morlacchi (SB8); Simone Barlaam (S9); Federico Bicelli (S7)	Italy	4:21.66	Q
5	2	6	Andrey Garbe (S9); Ruan Souza (SB9); Phelipe Rodrigues (S10); Talisson Glock (S6)	Brazil	4:27.08	Q
6	2	5	Sergio Martos (S8); Oscar Salguero Galisteo (SB8); David Levecq (S10); Carlos Martínez Fernández (S8)	Spain	4:29.67	Q
7	2	2	Kota Kubota (S8); Takuro Yamada (SB8); Akito Minai (S10); Kotaro Ogiwara (S8)	Japan	4:32.18	Q
8	1	5	Liu Fengqi (S8); Yang Guanglong (SB8); Yang Feng (S8); Xu Haijiao (S8)	China	4:42.57	Q
9	1	6	Joey Peppersack (S8); Zach Shattuck (SB6); Matthew Torres (S8); Jamal Hill (S9)	United States	4:50.05	

== Final ==
Rank	Lane	Nation	Swimmers	Time	Notes
1st place, gold medalist(s)	4	RPC	Bogdan Mozgovoi (S9 1:01.00 WR); Andrei Kalina (SB8); Alexander Skaliukh (S9); Andrei Nikolaev (S8)	4:06.59	WR
2nd place, silver medalist(s)	3	Australia	Timothy Hodge (S9); Timothy Disken (SB8); William Martin (S9); Ben Popham (S8)	4:07.70	OC
3rd place, bronze medalist(s)	6	Italy	Riccardo Menciotti (S10); Stefano Raimondi (SB9); Simone Barlaam (S9); Antonio Fantin (S6)	4:11.20	
4	7	Spain	Iñigo Llopis Sanz (S8); Oscar Salguero Galisteo (SB8); José Antonio Mari (S9); Jacobo Garrido (S9)	4:15.84	
5	5	Netherlands	Querijn Hensen (S10); Tim van Duuren (SB8); Bas Takken (S10); Thijs van Hofweegen (S6)	4:22.25	
6	8	China	Liu Fengqi (S8); Yang Guanglong (SB8); Feng Yang (S8); Xu Haijiao (S8)	4:22.72	
7	2	Brazil	Andrey Garbe (S9); Ruan Souza (SB9); Phelipe Rodrigues (S10); Talisson Glock (S6)	4:24.61	
8	1	Japan	Kota Kubota (S8); Takuro Yamada (SB8); Akito Minai (S10); Kotaro Ogiwara (S8)	4:29.85	
