= Swimming at the 2020 Summer Paralympics – medley relay =

The medley relay swimming events for the 2020 Summer Paralympics took place at the Tokyo Aquatics Centre from September 2 to September 3, 2021. A total of two events were contested.

== Schedule ==
| H | Heats | ½ | Semifinals | F | Final |

| Date | Thu 2 | | Fri 3 | |
| Event | M | E | M | E |
|---|---|---|---|---|
| Men's 4x100m | H | F | | |
| Women's 4x100m | | | H | F |

== Medal summary ==
The following is a summary of the medals awarded across all 4 × 100 metre medley relay events. Medals are also awarded to swimmers who have swum in heats.

| Event | Class | Gold | | Silver | | Bronze | |
|---|---|---|---|---|---|---|---|
| Men's 4 × 100 m | 34 pts | RPC; Bogdan Mozgovoi; Andrei Kalina; Alexander Skaliukh; Andrei Nikolaev; Andrei Gladkov^{[a]} Dmitry Grigoryev^{[a]} Daniil Smirnov^{[a]} Denis Tarasov^{[a]} | 4:06.59; WR | Australia; Timothy Hodge; Timothy Disken; William Martin; Ben Popham; Blake Cochrane^{[a]} | 4:07.70 | Italy; Riccardo Menciotti; Stefano Raimondi; Simone Barlaam; Antonio Fantin; Federico Bicelli^{[a]} Federico Morlacchi^{[a]} | 4:11.20 |
| Women's 4 × 100 m | 34 pts | United States; Hannah Aspden; Mikaela Jenkins; Jessica Long; Morgan Stickney | 4:52.40 | RPC; Anastasiia Gontar; Elizaveta Sidorenko; Viktoriia Ishchiulova; Ani Palian | 4:55.55 | Australia; Ellie Cole; Keira Stephens; Emily Beecroft; Isabella Vincent | 4:55.70 |

^{a} Swimmers who participated in the heats only and received medals.

== Results ==
The following were the results of the finals only of each of the medley relay events in each of the classifications. Further details of each event, including where appropriate heats and semi finals results, are available on that event's dedicated page.

=== Men's 4x100m ===
The final in this classification took place on 3 September 2021:

| Rank | Lane | Name | Nationality | Time | Notes |
|---|---|---|---|---|---|
| 4 | 1st place, gold medalist(s) | Bogdan Mozgovoi; Andrei Kalina; Alexander Skaliukh; Andrei Nikolaev; Andrei Gladkov^{[a]} Dmitry Grigoryev^{[a]} Daniil Smirnov^{[a]} Denis Tarasov^{[a]} | RPC | 4:06.59 | WR |
| 3 | 2nd place, silver medalist(s) | Timothy Hodge; Timothy Disken; William Martin; Ben Popham; Blake Cochrane^{[a]} | Australia | 4:07.70 | |
| 6 | 3rd place, bronze medalist(s) | Riccardo Menciotti; Stefano Raimondi; Simone Barlaam; Antonio Fantin; Federico Bicelli (Note: He swam in heats.); Federico Morlacchi | Italy | 4:11.20 | |
| 4 | 7 | Iñigo Llopis Sanz; Oscar Salguero Galisteo; José Antonio Mari; Jacobo Garrido | Spain | 4:15.84 | |
| 5 | 5 | Querijn Hensen; Tim van Duuren; Bas Takken; Thijs van Hofweegen | Netherlands | 4:22.25 | |
| 6 | 8 | Liu Fengqi; Yang Guanglong; Feng Yang; Xu Haijiao | China | 4:22.72 | |
| 7 | 2 | Andrey Garbe; Ruan Souza; Phelipe Rodrigues; Talisson Glock | Brazil | 4:24.61 | |
| 8 | 1 | Kota Kubota; Takuro Yamada; Akito Minai; Kotaro Ogiwara | Japan | 4:29.85 | |

=== Women's 4x100m ===
The final in this classification took place on 2 September 2021:

| Rank | Lane | Name | Nationality | Time | Notes |
|---|---|---|---|---|---|
| 1st place, gold medalist(s) | 5 | Hannah Aspden; Mikaela Jenkins; Jessica Long; Morgan Stickney | United States | 4:52.40 | |
| 2nd place, silver medalist(s) | 1 | Anastasiia Gontar; Elizaveta Sidorenko; Viktoriia Ishchiulova; Ani Palian | RPC | 4:55.55 | |
| 3rd place, bronze medalist(s) | 2 | Ellie Cole; Keira Stephens; Emily Beecroft; Isabella Vincent | Australia | 4:55.70 | |
| 4 | 4 | Stephanie Millward; Maisie Summers-Newton; Toni Shaw; Zara Mullooly | Great Britain | 4:58.76 | |
| 5 | 3 | Nuria Marqués Soto; Sarai Gascón Moreno; Isabel Yingüa Hernández; Teresa Perales | Spain | 5:04.58 | |
| | 6 | Danielle Kisser; Katarina Roxon; Morgan Bird; Abi Tripp | Canada | DSQ | |
| | 7 | Jiang Yuyan; Zhang Meng; Xu Jialing; Song Lingling | China | DSQ | |
