= Swimming at the 2020 Summer Paralympics – Men's 400 metre freestyle =

The Men's 400 metre freestyle swimming events for the 2020 Summer Paralympics took place at the Tokyo Aquatics Centre from August 25 to September 2, 2021. A total of seven events were contested over this distance.

== Schedule ==
H	Heats	½	Semifinals	F	Final

Date	Wed 25		Thu 26		Fri 27		Sat 28		Sun 29		Mon 30		Tue 31		Wed 1		Thu 2	
Event	M	E	M	E	M	E	M	E	M	E	M	E	M	E	M	E	M	E
S6 400m																	H	F
S7 400m									H	F								
S8 400m													H	F				
S9 400m	H	F																
S10 400m															H	F		
S11 400m			H	F														
S13 400m					H	F												

== Medal summary ==
The following is a summary of the medals awarded across all 400 metre freestyle events.

Classification	Gold		Silver		Bronze	
S6	Talisson Glock; Brazil	4:54.42	Antonio Fantin; Italy	4:55.70	Viacheslav Lenskii; RPC	5:04.84
S7	Mark Malyar; Israel	4:31.06 WR	Andrii Trusov; Ukraine	4:35.56	Evan Austin; United States	4:38.95
S8	Andrei Nikolaev; RPC	4:25.16	Alberto Amodeo; Italy	4:25.93	Matthew Torres; United States	4:28.47
S9	William Martin; Australia	4:10.25 PR	Ugo Didier; France	4:11.33	Alexander Tuckfield; Australia	4:13.54
S10	Maksym Krypak; Ukraine	3:59.62	Bas Takken; Netherlands	4:02.02	Thomas Gallagher; Australia	4:03.91
S11	Rogier Dorsman; Netherlands	4:28.47	Uchu Tomita; Japan	4:31.69	Hua Dongdong; China	4:34.89
S13	Ihar Boki; Belarus	3:58.18	Kyrylo Garashchenko; Ukraine	4:02.07	Alex Portal; France	4:06.49

== Results ==
The following were the results of the finals only of each of the Men's 400 metre freestyle events in each of the classifications. Further details of each event, including where appropriate heats and semi finals results, are available on that event's dedicated page.

=== S6 ===
The S6 category is for swimmers who have short stature, arm amputations, or some form of coordination problem on one side of their body.

The final in this classification took place on 2 September 2021:

Rank	Lane	Name	Nationality	Time	Notes
1st place, gold medalist(s)	4	Talisson Glock	Brazil	4.54.42	
2nd place, silver medalist(s)	3	Antonio Fantin	Italy	4.55.70	
3rd place, bronze medalist(s)	5	Viacheslav Lenskii	RPC	5.04.84	
4	2	Andrei Granichka	RPC	5.05.30	
5	6	Juan Gutierrez Bermudez	Mexico	5:15.23	
6	8	Daniel Videira	Portugal	5:24.92	
7	7	Raul Gutierrez Bermudez	Mexico	5:28.62	
8	1	Lorenzo Perez Escalona	Cuba	5:30.42	

=== S7 ===
The S7 category is for swimmers who have one leg and one arm amputation on opposite side or paralysis on one side of their body. These swimmers have full control of their arms and trunk but variable function in their legs.

The final in this classification took place on 29 August 2021:

Rank	Lane	Name	Nationality	Time	Notes
1st place, gold medalist(s)	4	Mark Malyar	Israel	4.31.06	WR
2nd place, silver medalist(s)	6	Andrii Trusov	Ukraine	4.35.56	
3rd place, bronze medalist(s)	2	Evan Austin	United States	4.38.95	
4	3	Inaki Basiloff	Argentina	4.38.99	
5	5	Federico Bicelli	Italy	4.43.67	
6	7	Ernie Gawilan	Philippines	4.56.24	
7	1	Wei Soong Toh	Singapore	5.06.39	
8	8	Chen Liang-Da	Chinese Taipei	5.10.65	

=== S8 ===
The S8 category is for swimmers who have a single amputation, or restrictive movement in their hip, knee and ankle joints.

The final in this classification took place on 31 August 2021:

Rank	Lane	Name	Nationality	Time	Notes
1st place, gold medalist(s)	5	Andrei Nikolaev	RPC	4.25.16	
2nd place, silver medalist(s)	7	Alberto Amodeo	Italy	4.25.93	
3rd place, bronze medalist(s)	4	Matthew Torres	United States	4.28.47	
4	6	Haijiao Xu	China	4.29.93	
5	3	Robert Griswold	United States	4.31.96	
6	2	Caio Amorim	Brazil	4.35.16	
7	1	Iñigo Llopis Sanz	Spain	4.45.69	
8	8	Ben Popham	Australia	4.49.32	

=== S9 ===
The S9 category is for swimmers who have joint restrictions in one leg or double below-the-knee amputations.

The final in this classification took place on 25 August 2021:

Rank	Lane	Name	Nationality	Time	Notes
1st place, gold medalist(s)	6	William Martin	Australia	4:10.25	PR
2nd place, silver medalist(s)	5	Ugo Didier	France	4:11.33	
3rd place, bronze medalist(s)	4	Alexander Tuckfield	Australia	4:13.54	
4	2	Brenden Hall	Australia	4:14.48	
5	7	Jacobo Garrido	Spain	4:17.41	
6	3	Simone Barlaam	Italy	4:22.40	
7	1	Federico Morlacchi	Italy	4:24.75	
7	8	Igor Hrehorowicz	Poland	4:24.75	

=== S10 ===
The S10 category is for swimmers who have minor physical impairments, for example, loss of one hand.

The final in this classification took place on 1 September 2021:

Rank	Lane	Name	Nationality	Time	Notes
1st place, gold medalist(s)	6	Maksym Krypak	Ukraine	3.59.62	
2nd place, silver medalist(s)	4	Bas Takken	Netherlands	4.02.02	
3rd place, bronze medalist(s)	3	Thomas Gallagher	Australia	4.03.91	
4	8	Stefano Raimondi	Italy	4.07.38	
5	5	Alexander Elliot	Canada	4.10.29	
6	7	Florent Marais	France	4.14.98	
7	1	Justin Kaps	Germany	4.15.85	
8	2	Alan Ogorzalek	Poland	4.18.52	

=== S11 ===
The S11 category is for swimmers who have severe visual impairments and have very low or no light perception, such as blindness, they are required to wear blackened goggles to compete. They use tappers when competing in swimming events.

The final in this classification took place on 26 August 2021:

Rank	Lane	Name	Nationality	Time	Notes
1st place, gold medalist(s)	4	Rogier Dorsman	Netherlands	4:28.47	
2nd place, silver medalist(s)	5	Uchu Tomita	Japan	4:31.69	
3rd place, bronze medalist(s)	3	Hua Dongdong	China	4:34.89	
4	6	Mykhailo Serbin	Ukraine	4:41.21	
5	2	Matheus Rheine Correa de Souza	Brazil	4:44.64	
6	1	José Ramón Cantero Elvira	Spain	4:57.25	
7	7	Matthew Cabraja	Canada	4:57.63	
	8	Viktor Smyrnov	Ukraine	DNS	

=== S13 ===
The S13 category is for swimmers who have minor visual impairment and have high visual acuity. They are required to wear blackened goggles to compete. They may wish to use a tapper.

The final in this classification took place on 27 August 2021:

Rank	Lane	Name	Nationality	Time	Notes
1st place, gold medalist(s)	4	Ihar Boki	Belarus	3.58.18	
2nd place, silver medalist(s)	5	Kyrylo Garaschenko	Ukraine	4.02.07	
3rd place, bronze medalist(s)	3	Alex Portal	France	4.06.49	
4	7	Braedan Jason	Australia	4.12.75	
5	6	Vladimir Sotnikov	RPC	4.15.93	
6	2	Taliso Engel	Germany	4.20.73	
7	1	Salguero Oteiza Ivan	Spain	4.21.56	
8	8	Sergey Punko	RPC	4.28.52	
