= Swimming at the 2020 Summer Paralympics – Men's 100 metre freestyle =

The Men's 100 metre freestyle swimming events for the 2020 Summer Paralympics took place at the Tokyo Aquatics Centre from August 25 to September 1, 2021. A total of six events were contested over this distance.

== Schedule ==
H	Heats	½	Semifinals	F	Final

Date	Wed 25		Thu 26		Fri 27		Sat 28		Sun 29		Mon 30		Tue 31		Wed 1	
Event	M	E	M	E	M	E	M	E	M	E	M	E	M	E	M	E
S4 100m			H	F												
S5 100m			H	F												
S6 100m															H	F
S8 100m	H	F														
S10 100m							H	F								
S12 100m													H	F		

== Medal summary ==
The following is a summary of the medals awarded across all 100 metre freestyle events.

Classification	Gold		Silver		Bronze	
S4	Takayuki Suzuki; Japan	1:21.58 PR	Luigi Beggiato; Italy	1:23.21	Roman Zhdanov; RPC	1:26.95
S5	Francesco Bocciardo; Italy	1:09.56	Wang Lichao; China	1:10.45	Daniel Dias; Brazil	1:10.80
S6	Antonio Fantin; Italy	1:03.71 WR	Nelson Crispín; Colombia	1:04.82	Talisson Glock; Brazil	1:05.45
S8	Ben Popham; Australia	57.37	Andrei Nikolaev; RPC	57.69	Dimosthenis Michalentzakis; Greece	58.73
S10	Maksym Krypak; Ukraine	50.64 WR	Rowan Crothers; Australia	51.37	Stefano Raimondi; Italy	51.45
S12	Raman Salei; Azerbaijan	52.69	Maksym Veraksa; Ukraine	52.87	Stephen Clegg; Great Britain	53.43

== Results ==
The following were the results of the finals only of each of the Men's 100 metre freestyle events in each of the classifications. Further details of each event, including where appropriate heats and semi finals results, are available on that event's dedicated page.

=== S4 ===
The S4 category is for swimmers who have function in their hands and arms but can't use their trunk or legs to swim. Swimmers in this class can also have three amputated limbs.

The final in this classification took place on 26 August 2021:

Rank	Lane	Name	Nationality	Time	Notes
1st place, gold medalist(s)	5	Takayuki Suzuki	Japan	1:21.58	PR
2nd place, silver medalist(s)	4	Luigi Beggiato	Italy	1:23.21	
3rd place, bronze medalist(s)	6	Roman Zhdanov	RPC	1:26.95	
4	3	Angel Camocho Ramirez	Mexico	1:27.71	
5	2	Jo Giseong	South Korea	1:28.46	
6	1	David Smetanine	France	1:29.47	
7	8	Lyndon Longhorne	Great Britain	1:33.30	
8	7	Gustavo Sánchez Martínez	Mexico	1:35.55	

=== S5 ===
The S5 category is for swimmers who have hemiplegia, paraplegia or short stature.

The final in this classification took place on 26 August 2021:

Rank	Lane	Name	Nationality	Time	Notes
1st place, gold medalist(s)	2	Francesco Bocciardo	Italy	1:09.56	
2nd place, silver medalist(s)	7	Wang Lichao	China	1:10.45	
3rd place, bronze medalist(s)	5	Daniel de Faria Dias	Brazil	1:10.80	
4	6	Zheng Tao	China	1:10.87	
5	4	Yuan Weiyi	China	1:11.68	
6	3	Antoni Ponce Bertran	Spain	1:13.47	
7	1	Muhammed Nur Syaiful Zulkafli	Malaysia	1:15.12	
8	8	Luis Huerta Poza	Spain	1:17.97	

=== S6 ===
The S6 category is for swimmers who have short stature, arm amputations, or some form of coordination problem on one side of their body.

The final in this classification took place on 1 September 2021:

Rank	Lane	Name	Nationality	Time	Notes
1st place, gold medalist(s)	4	Antonio Fantin	Italy	1:03.71	WR
2nd place, silver medalist(s)	3	Nelson Crispín	Colombia	1:04.82	
3rd place, bronze medalist(s)	5	Talisson Glock	Brazil	1:05.45	
4	1	Jia Hongguang	China	1:05.55	AS
5	7	Thijs van Hofweegen	Netherlands	1:06.39	
6	6	Oleksandr Komarov	Ukraine	1:07.02	
7	2	Laurent Chardard	France	1:07.60	
8	8	Wang Jingang	China	1:08.61	

=== S8 ===
The S8 category is for swimmers who have a single amputation, or restrictive movement in their hip, knee and ankle joints.

The final in this classification took place on 25 August 2021:

Rank	Lane	Name	Nationality	Time	Notes
1st place, gold medalist(s)	4	Ben Popham	Australia	57.37	
2nd place, silver medalist(s)	6	Andrei Nikolaev	RPC	57.69	
3rd place, bronze medalist(s)	5	Dimosthenis Michalentzakis	Greece	58.73	
4	2	Xu Haijiao	China	58.75	
5	3	Denys Dubrov	Ukraine	59.02	
6	1	Yang Guanglong	China	59.42	
7	7	Alberto Amodeo	Italy	59.93	
8	8	Luis Armando Andrade Guillen	Mexico	1:01.23	

=== S10 ===
The S10 category is for swimmers who have minor physical impairments, for example, loss of one hand.

The final in this classification took place on 28 August 2021:

Rank	Lane	Name	Nationality	Time	Notes
1st place, gold medalist(s)	4	Maksym Krypak	Ukraine	50.64	WR
2nd place, silver medalist(s)	5	Rowan Crothers	Australia	51.37	
3rd place, bronze medalist(s)	3	Stefano Raimondi	Italy	51.45	
4	2	Phelipe Andrews Melo Rodrigues	Brazil	52.04	
5	6	Thomas Gallagher	Australia	53.14	
6	7	Bas Takken	Netherlands	54.06	
7	8	Dmitrii Bartasinskii	RPC	54.09	
8	1	Alan Ogorzalek	Poland	55.45	

=== S12 ===
The S12 category is for swimmers who have moderate visual impairment and have a visual field of less than 5 degrees radius. They are required to wear blackened goggles to compete. They may wish to use a tapper.

The final in this classification took place on 31 August 2021:

Rank	Lane	Name	Nationality	Time	Notes
1st place, gold medalist(s)	5	Raman Salei	Azerbaijan	52.69	
2nd place, silver medalist(s)	6	Maksym Veraksa	Ukraine	52.87	
3rd place, bronze medalist(s)	4	Stephen Clegg	Great Britain	53.43	
4	2	Illia Yaremenko	Ukraine	53.60	
5	3	Braedan Jason	Australia	53.78	OC
6	7	Roman Makarov	RPC	57.56	
7	1	Sergey Punko	RPC	59.30	
