= Swimming at the 2024 Summer Paralympics – Men's 400 metre freestyle S8 =

Men's 400 metre freestyle S8 at the XVII Paralympic Games
- Venue: La Défense Arena
- Date: 4 September 2024
- Competitors: 14 from 10 nations
- Winning time: 4:23.23

Medalists
1st place, gold medalist(s)		Alberto Amodeo	Italy
2nd place, silver medalist(s)		Reid Maxwell	Canada
3rd place, bronze medalist(s)		Andrei Nikolaev	Neutral Paralympic Athletes

The men's 400 metre freestyle swimming (S8) event at the 2024 Summer Paralympics took place on 4 September 2024, at the La Défense Arena in Paris.

== Records ==
Prior to the competition, the existing world and Paralympic records were as follows.

World Record	Oliver Hynd (GBR)	4:19.74	Sheffield, Great Britain	25 July 2017
Paralympic Record	Oliver Hynd (GBR)	4:21.89	Rio de Janeiro, Brazil	8 September 2016

== Results ==
=== Heats ===
The heats were started at 10:05.

Rank	Heat	Lane	Name	Nationality	Time	Notes
1	1	4	Reid Maxwell	Canada	4:25.95	Q, AM
2	1	5	Noah Jaffe	United States	4:26.80	Q
3	2	3	Matthew Torres	United States	4:32.75	Q
4	2	5	Andrei Nikolaev	Neutral Paralympic Athletes	4:32.87	Q
5	2	4	Alberto Amodeo	Italy	4:33.12	Q
6	2	2	Callum Simpson	Australia	4:35.79	Q
7	1	3	Xu Haijiao	China	4:36.82	Q
8	1	6	Iñigo Llopis	Spain	4:37.02	Q
9	2	1	Li Ting	China	4:37.11	
10	1	2	Diogo Cancela	Portugal	4:37.50	
11	1	7	Philippe Vachon	Canada	4:39.79	
12	2	6	Mark Malyar	Israel	4:42.39	
13	1	1	Wu Hongliang	China	4:45.07	
14	2	7	Turgut Aslan Yaraman	Turkey	4:45.71	

=== Final ===
The final was held at 17:58.

Rank	Lane	Name	Nationality	Time	Notes
1st place, gold medalist(s)	2	Alberto Amodeo	Italy	4:23.23	
2nd place, silver medalist(s)	4	Reid Maxwell	Canada	4:23.90	AM
3rd place, bronze medalist(s)	6	Andrei Nikolaev	Neutral Paralympic Athletes	4:24.00	
4	5	Noah Jaffe	United States	4:25.07	
5	3	Matthew Torres	United States	4:32.25	
6	7	Callum Simpson	Australia	4:34.79	
7	1	Xu Haijiao	China	4:36.34	
8	8	Iñigo Llopis	Spain	4:37.29	
