= Swimming at the 2020 Summer Paralympics – Men's 4 × 100 metre freestyle relay 34pts =

Men's 4 × 100 metre freestyle relay - 34 points at the XVI Paralympic Games
- Venue: Tokyo Aquatics Centre
- Dates: 30 August 2021
- Competitors: from 8 nations
- Winning time: 3:44.31

Medalists
1st place, gold medalist(s)		Australia (AUS)
2nd place, silver medalist(s)		Italy (ITA)
3rd place, bronze medalist(s)		Ukraine (UKR)

The men's 4 × 100 metre freestyle relay - 34 points swimming events for the 2020 Summer Paralympics took place at the Tokyo Aquatics Centre on 30 August 2021.

== Competition format ==
Relay teams are based on a point score. The sport class of an individual swimmer is worth the actual number value i.e. sport class S6 is worth six points, sport class S12 is worth twelve points, and so on. The total of all the competitors must add up to 34 points or less.

== Final ==
Rank	Lane	Nation	Swimmers	Time	Notes
1st place, gold medalist(s)	3	Australia	Rowan Crothers (S10); William Martin (S9); Matt Levy (S7); Ben Popham (S8)	3:44.31	WR
2nd place, silver medalist(s)	4	Italy	Antonio Fantin (S6); Simone Ciulli (S9); Simone Barlaam (S9); Stefano Raimondi (S10)	3:45.89	ER
3rd place, bronze medalist(s)	5	Ukraine	Iurii Bozhynskyi (S9); Denys Dubrov (S8); Andrii Trusov (S7); Maksym Krypak (S10)	3:47.40	
4	2	Brazil	Ruiter Gonçalves (S9); Vanilton Filho (S9); Talisson Glock (S6); Phelipe Rodrigues (S10)	3:52.28	
5	6	RPC	Bogdan Mozgovoi (S9); Andrei Gladkov (S7); Andrei Nikolaev (S8); Dmitrii Bartasinskii (S10)	3:54.34	
6	1	China	Yang Guanglong (S8); Liu Fengqi (S8); Yang Feng (S8); Xu Haijiao (S8)	4:00.18	
7	7	Spain	Jacobo Garrido (S9); Sergio Martos (S8); Iñigo Llopis Sanz (S8); José Antonio Mari (S9)	4:00.71	
8	8	United States	Rudy Garcia-Tolson (S7); Joseph Peppersack (S8); Evan Austin (S7); Jamal Hill (S9)	4:13.94	
