= 2025 World Para Swimming Championships – Men's 400 metre freestyle =

The men's 400 metre freestyle events at the 2025 World Para Swimming Championships were held at the Singapore Aquatic Centre between 21 and 27 September 2025. Six races will be held over the distance.

== Schedule ==
The 400 metre freestyle events for men will be held across the following schedule:

men's 400 metre freestyle
Day	Date	Classifications
Day 1	21 Sept	S8
Day 2	22 Sept	S7
Day 3	23 Sept	S10
Day 4	24 Sept	S6
Day 5	25 Sept	S9
Day 6	26 Sept	S13
Day 7	27 Sept	S11

== Medal summary ==
Event	Gold	Silver	Bronze
S6; Details	Antonio Fantin; Italy	Talisson Glock; Brazil	Andrei Granichka; Individual Neutral Athletes
S7; Details	Federico Bicelli; Italy	Inaki Basiloff; Argentina	Aleksei Ganiuk; Individual Neutral Athletes
S8; Details	Alberto Amodeo; Italy	Andrei Nikolaev; Individual Neutral Athletes	Callum Simpson; Australia
S9; Details	Simone Barlaam; Italy	Jacobo Garrido Brun; Spain	Brenden Hall; Australia
S10; Details	Bas Takken; Netherlands	Koehn Boyd; United States	Alexander Tuckfield; Australia
S11; Details	David Kratochvíl; Czech Republic	Uchu Tomita; Japan	Marco Meneses; Portugal
S13; Details	Egor Shchitkovskii; Individual Neutral Athletes	Alex Portal; France	Kylian Portal; France

== Race summaries ==
=== S6 ===
The men's 400 metre freestyle S6 event was held on 26 September.

The relevant records at the beginning of the event were as follows:

Record	Athlete	Time	Date	City	Country
World	Anders Olsson (SWE)	4:47.75	2009-10-18	Reykjavík	Iceland
Championship	Talisson Glock (BRA)	4:52.42	2023-08-03	Manchester	United Kingdom
African	Ahmed Ali (EGY)	5:37.34	2017-12-02	Mexico City	Mexico
Americas	Talisson Glock (BRA)	4:52.42	2023-08-03	Manchester	United Kingdom
Asian	Tang Qian (CHN)	5:08.21	2023-10-26	Hangzhou	China
European	Anders Olsson (SWE)	4:47.75	2009-10-18	Reykjavík	Iceland
Oceania	Hamish McLean (NZL)	5:22.00	2019-09-09	London	United Kingdom

==== Heats ====
Ten swimmers took part, with the top eight progressing to the final

Rank	Heat	Lane	Athlete	Class	Result	Notes
1	1	5	Talisson Glock (BRA)	S6	5:13.38	Q
2	1	6	Andrei Granichka (AIN)	S6	5:14.14	Q
3	1	7	Mikhail Evseenko (AIN)	S6	5:14.69	Q
4	1	4	Antonio Fantin (ITA)	S6	5:15.58	Q
5	1	3	Jesús Alberto Gutiérrez (MEX)	S6	5:16.83	Q
6	1	2	Tang Qian (CHN)	S6	5:17.09	Q
7	1	1	David Rendón (COL)	S6	5:17.78	Q
8	1	8	Raul Gutiérrez (MEX)	S6	5:21.78	Q
9	1	0	Bruce Dee (GBR)	S6	5:25.59	
10	1	9	Josué Rodrigo (ESA)	S6	6:00.34	

==== Final ====
Rank	Lane	Athlete	Class	Result	Notes
1st place, gold medalist(s)	6	Antonio Fantin (ITA)	S6	4:52.61	
2nd place, silver medalist(s)	4	Talisson Glock (BRA)	S6	5:00.99	
3rd place, bronze medalist(s)	5	Andrei Granichka (AIN)	S6	5:03.79	
4	2	Jesús Alberto Gutiérrez (MEX)	S6	5:08.60	
5	7	Tang Qian (CHN)	S6	5:09.67	
6	3	Mikhail Evseenko (AIN)	S6	5:14.64	
7	1	David Rendón (COL)	S6	5:16.32	
8	8	Raul Gutiérrez (MEX)	S6	5:21.69	

=== S7 ===
The men's 400 metre freestyle S7 event was held on 22 September.

The relevant records at the beginning of the event were as follows:

Record	Athlete	Time	Date	City	Country
World	Mark Malyar (ISR)	4:31.06	2021-08-29	Tokyo	Japan
Championship	Mark Malyar (ISR)	4:33.64	2019-09-10	London	United Kingdom
Americas	Inaki Basiloff (ARG)	4:38.58	2023-03-18	Sheffield	United Kingdom
Asian	Pan Shiyun (CHN)	4:46.22	2012-09-06	London	United Kingdom
European	Mark Malyar (ISR)	4:31.06	2021-08-29	Tokyo	Japan
Oceania	Matthew Levy (AUS)	4:48.82	2019-09-10	London	United Kingdom

==== Heats ====
Twelve swimmers took part, with the top eight progressing to the final.

Rank	Heat	Lane	Athlete	Time	Note
1	2	4	Federico Bicelli (ITA)	4:57.01	Q
2	2	5	Aleksei Ganiuk (AIN)	4:59.00	Q
3	1	4	Inaki Basiloff (ARG)	4:59.14	Q
4	2	2	Riccardo Magrassi (ITA)	5:01.20	Q
5	1	5	Yaroslav Karpenko (UKR)	5:04.74	Q
6	2	3	Ernie Gawilan (PHI)	5:09.14	Q
7	2	6	Karlo Knezevic (CRO)	5:11.75	Q
8	1	3	Ricardo Soares (POR)	5:12.07	Q
9	1	2	Adin Williams (USA)	5:15.96	R
10	1	7	Wei Soong Toh (SGP)	5:19.35	R
11	1	6	Xianquan Huang (CHN)	5:51.01	
-	2	7	Darius Dumitru (ROU)	DNS	

==== Final ====
Rank	Lane	Athlete	Result	Notes
1st place, gold medalist(s)	4	Federico Bicelli (ITA)	4:39.52	
2nd place, silver medalist(s)	3	Inaki Basiloff (ARG)	4:43.76	
3rd place, bronze medalist(s)	5	Aleksei Ganiuk (AIN)	4:55.00	
4	2	Yaroslav Karpenko (UKR)	4:56.88	
5	6	Riccardo Magrassi (ITA)	5:03.65	
6	7	Ernie Gawilan (PHI)	5:06.65	
7	8	Ricardo Soares (POR)	5:07.70	
8	1	Karlo Knezevic (CRO)	5:11.77	

=== S8 ===
The men's 400 metre freestyle S8 event was held on 23 September. Nine swimmers took part, with the top eight progressing to the final.

The relevant records at the beginning of the event were as follows:

Record	Athlete	Time	Date	City	Country
World	Oliver Hynd (GBR)	4:19.74	2017-07-25	Sheffield	United Kingdom
Championship	Oliver Hynd (GBR)	4:24.32	2015-07-17	Glasgow	United Kingdom
African	Geosh Nienaber (RSA)	5:09.47	2023-11-12	Cairo	Egypt
Americas	Reid Maxwell (CAN)	4:23.90	2024-09-04	Paris	France
Asian	Xu Haijiao (CHN)	4:25.65	2016-09-08	Rio de Janeiro	Brazil
European	Oliver Hynd (GBR)	4:19.74	2017-07-25	Sheffield	United Kingdom
Oceania	Callum Simpson (AUS)	4:29.54	2025-04-25	Indianapolis	United States

==== Heats ====
The heat takes place in the morning of 21 September, at 9:00 a.m. and is the opening race of the meet. All nine swimmers raced in a single heat.

Rank	Heat	Lane	Athlete	Time	Note
1	1	2	Callum Simpson (AUS)	4:27.17	Q OC
2	1	5	Reid Maxwell (CAN)	4:27.37	Q
3	1	4	Alberto Amodeo (ITA)	4:32.33	Q
4	1	3	Andrei Nikolaev (AIN)	4:32.89	Q
5	1	6	Noah Jaffe (USA)	4:33.32	Q
6	1	7	Evgenii Stepanov (AIN)	4:33.91	Q
7	1	8	Li Ting (CHN)	4:36.28	Q
8	1	1	Inigo Llopis Sanz (ESP)	4:45.44	Q
9	1	0	Marco Ozaeta Velasco (ESP)	4:54.97	R

==== Final ====
Rank	Lane	Athlete	Time	Note
1st place, gold medalist(s)		Alberto Amodeo (ITA)	4:23.27	
2nd place, silver medalist(s)		Andrei Nikolaev (AIN)	4:24.06	
3rd place, bronze medalist(s)		Callum Simpson (AUS)	4:25.76	OC
4		Reid Maxwell (CAN)	4:27.65	
5		Noah Jaffe (USA)	4:31.03	
6		Evgenii Stepanov (AIN)	4:33.15	
7		Ting Li (CHN)	4:34.23	
8		Inigo Llopis Sanz (ESP)	4:39.40	

=== S9 ===
The men's 400 metre freestyle S9 event was held on 25 September. Eleven swimmers took part, with the top eight progressing to the final.

The relevant records at the beginning of the event were as follows:

Record	Athlete	Time	Date	City	Country
World	Brenden Hall (AUS)	4:09.93	2013-08-16	Montreal	Canada
Championship	Brenden Hall (AUS)	4:09.93	2013-08-16	Montreal	Canada
African	Mazen Ali Tony (EGY)	7:00.71	2023-11-12	Cairo	Egypt
Americas	Michael Prout (USA)	4:24.97	2007-03-16	Montreal	Canada
Asian	Taiyo Kawabuchi (JPN)	4:16.76	2025-06-29	Yokohama	Japan
European	Simone Barlaam (ITA)	4:10.78	2022-06-16	Funchal	Portugal
Oceania	Brenden Hall (AUS)	4:09.93	2013-08-16	Montreal	Canada

==== Heats ====
Rank	Heat	Lane	Athlete	Class	Result	Notes
1	2	4	Ugo Didier (FRA)	S9	4:20.82	Q
2	2	5	Brenden Hall (AUS)	S9	4:21.22	Q
3	2	6	Harrison Vig (AUS)	S9	4:21.27	Q
4	1	5	Jacobo Garrido Brun (ESP)	S9	4:23.46	Q
5	2	3	Taiyo Kawabuchi (JPN)	S9	4:23.51	Q
6	1	3	Sam de Visser (BEL)	S9	4:24.16	Q
7	1	4	Simone Barlaam (ITA)	S9	4:24.78	Q
8	1	6	Xie Zhili (CHN)	S9	4:29.01	Q
9	1	2	Lewis Bishop (AUS)	S9	4:30.28	
10	2	2	Jian Wang Escanilla Candial (ESP)	S9	4:33.35	
11	2	7	Naveed Rasheen (SRI)	S9	4:43.53	

==== Final ====
Rank	Lane	Athlete	Class	Result	Notes
1st place, gold medalist(s)	1	Simone Barlaam (ITA)	S9	4:13.33	
2nd place, silver medalist(s)	6	Jacobo Garrido Brun (ESP)	S9	4:13.63	
3rd place, bronze medalist(s)	5	Brenden Hall (AUS)	S9	4:14.69	
4	4	Ugo Didier (FRA)	S9	4:15.33	
5	3	Harrison Vig (AUS)	S9	4:17.73	
6	2	Taiyo Kawabuchi (JPN)	S9	4:21.09	
7	7	Sam de Visser (BEL)	S9	4:21.38	
8	8	Xie Zhili (CHN)	S9	4:27.94	

=== S10 ===
The Men's 400 metre freestyle S10 event will be held on the evening of the 23 September. Ten swimmers enter, with the top eight proceeding to the final.

The relevant records at the beginning of the event were as follows:

Record	Athlete	Time	Date	City	Country
World	Maksym Krypak (UKR)	3:57.71	2016-09-15	Rio de Janeiro	Brazil
Championship	Maksym Krypak (UKR)	4:01.17	2019-09-11	London	United Kingdom
African	Kevin Paul (RSA)	4:16.46	2012-09-05	London	United Kingdom
Americas	Ian Silverman (USA)	4:03.57	2014-08-06	Pasadena	United States
Asian	Zhang Yunxiang (CHN)	4:21.43	2025-04-12	Fuji	Japan
European	Maksym Krypak (UKR)	3:57.71	2016-09-15	Rio de Janeiro	Brazil
Oceania	Thomas Gallagher (AUS)	4:03.91	2021-09-01	Tokyo	Japan

==== Heats ====
Rank	Heat	Lane	Athlete	Time	Note
1	1	4	Koehn Boyd (USA)	4:09.95	Q
2	1	3	Bas Takken (NED)	4:14.01	Q
3	1	5	Alexander Tuckfield (AUS)	4:14.28	Q
4	1	6	Alan Ogorzalek (POL)	4:16.82	Q
5	1	1	Zhang Yunxiang (CHN)	4:18.76	Q ASR
6	1	2	Kieran Williams (GBR)	4:22.23	Q
7	1	7	Alec Elliot (CAN)	4:26.36	Q
8	1	8	Roan Brennan (GBR)	4:30.50	Q
9	1	9	Emil Salemgareev (AIN)	4:30.75	R
10	1	0	Joao Fidalgo (POR)	4:35.08	R

==== Final ====
Rank	Lane	Athlete	Time	Note
1st place, gold medalist(s)	5	Bas Takken (NED)	4:05.28	
2nd place, silver medalist(s)	4	Koehn Boyd (USA)	4:05.89	
3rd place, bronze medalist(s)	3	Alexander Tuckfield (AUS)	4:06.89	
4	2	Zhang Yunxiang (CHN)	4:15.82	ASR
5	7	Kieran Williams (GBR)	4:16.60	
6	6	Alan Ogorzalek (POL)	4:17.77	
7	1	Alec Elliot (CAN)	4:21.00	
8	8	Roan Brennan (GBR)	4:26.78	

=== S11 ===
The men's 400 metre freestyle S11 event was held on 27 September.

The relevant records at the beginning of the event were as follows:

Record	Athlete	Time	Date	City	Country
World	John Morgan (USA)	5:04.31	1992-09-10	Barcelona	Spain
Americas	John Morgan (USA)	5:04.31	1992-09-10	Barcelona	Spain
Asian	Keiichi Kimura (JPN)	5:30.25	2015-12-10	Bismarck	United States
European	José Cantero (ESP)	5:45.05	2019-06-06	Berlin	Germany

==== Heats ====
Nine swimmers took part, with the top eight progressing to the final

Rank	Heat	Lane	Athlete	Class	Result	Notes
1	1	4	David Kratochvil (CZE)	S11	4:28.46	Q
2	1	5	Uchu Tomita (JPN)	S11	4:45.66	Q
3	1	6	Marco Meneses (POR)	S11	4:46.90	Q
4	1	7	Alex Kozlowski (POL)	S11	4:51.08	Q
5	1	2	Mykhailo Serbin (UKR)	S11	4:56.61	Q
6	1	1	Matheus Rheine (BRA)	S11	4:58.59	Q
7	1	3	Hua Dongdong (CHN)	S11	5:16.83	Q
8	1	8	Simonas Zvirblis (LTU)	S11	5:17.47	Q
9	1	0	Mahamadou Dambelleh Jarra (ESP)	S11	5:19.87	

==== Final ====
Rank	Lane	Athlete	Class	Result	Notes
1st place, gold medalist(s)	4	David Kratochvil (CZE)	S11	4:19.83	CR
2nd place, silver medalist(s)	5	Uchu Tomita (JPN)	S11	4:37.31	
3rd place, bronze medalist(s)	3	Marco Meneses (POR)	S11	4:37.46	
4	6	Alex Kozlowski (POL)	S11	4:45.41	
5	7	Matheus Rheine (BRA)	S11	5:05.68	
6	8	Simonas Zvirblis (LTU)	S11	5:11.37	
7	1	Hua Dongdong (CHN)	S11	5:22.89	
	2	Mykhailo Serbin (UKR)	S11		DSQ

=== S13 ===
The men's 400 metre freestyle event was held on 26 September. This event is open to S12 swimmers.

The relevant records at the beginning of the event were as follows:

Record	Athlete	Time	Date	City	Country
S12
World	Enrique Floriano (ESP)	4:46.81	2011-04-28	Berlin	Germany
Americas	John Morgan (USA)	5:06.77	1984-06-10	New York	United States
European	Enrique Floriano (ESP)	4:46.81	2011-04-28	Berlin	Germany
S13
World	Sean Russo (AUS)	4:54.71	2015-04-16	Berlin	Germany
Americas	Michael Edgson (CAN)	5:05.15	1990-07-17	Drachten	Netherlands
Asian	Genki Saito (JPN)	4:59.60	2019-06-06	Berlin	Germany
European	Noel Pedersen (NOR)	5:09.23	1992-09-10	Barcelona	Spain
Oceania	Sean Russo (AUS)	4:54.71	2015-04-16	Berlin	Germany

==== Heats ====
Twelve swimmers took part, with the top eight progressing to the final

Rank	Heat	Lane	Athlete	Class	Result	Notes
1	1	5	Egor Shchitkovskii (AIN)	S13	4:09.54	Q
2	1	4	Kylian Portal (FRA)	S12	4:12.64	Q
3	2	4	Alex Portal (FRA)	S13	4:13.43	Q
4	1	3	Evgenii Lazutin (AIN)	S13	4:15.76	Q
5	2	5	Nathan Hendricks (RSA)	S13	4:17.39	Q
6	1	2	Shamil Shahov (QAT)	S12	4:25.18	Q
7	2	3	Ivan Salguero Oteiza (ESP)	S12	4:26.79	Q
8	2	6	Yauheni Kavalionak (AIN)	S13	4:27.07	Q
9	1	6	Genki Saito (JPN)	S13	4:33.49	
10	2	7	Bogdan Biktimirov (UZB)	S13	4:34.82	
11	2	2	Juan Ferron Gutierrez (ESP)	S12	4:45.61	
12	1	7	Zhi Wei Wong (SGP)	S13	4:47.22	

==== Final ====
Rank	Lane	Athlete	Class	Result	Notes
1st place, gold medalist(s)	4	Egor Shchitkovskii (AIN)	S13	4:02.14	
2nd place, silver medalist(s)	3	Alex Portal (FRA)	S13	4:06.93	
3rd place, bronze medalist(s)	5	Kylian Portal (FRA)	S13	4:11.14	
4	2	Nathan Hendricks (RSA)	S13	4:15.28	
5	6	Evgenii Lazutin (AIN)	S13	4:16.65	
6	1	Ivan Salguero Oteiza (ESP)	S13	4:22.87	
7	7	Shamil Shahov (QAT)	S13	4:23.18	
8	8	Yauheni Kavalionak (AIN)	S13	4:23.42	
