= 2022 World Para Swimming Championships – Men's 100 metre backstroke =

The men's 100m backstroke events at the 2022 World Para Swimming Championships were held at the Penteada Olympic Swimming Complex in Madeira between 12 and 18 June.

== Medalists ==
Event	Gold	Silver	Bronze
S1	Anton Kol; Ukraine	Francesco Bettella; Italy	Jose Ronaldo da Silva; Brazil
S2	Gabriel Araújo; Brazil	Alberto Abarza; Chile	Jacek Czech; Poland
S6	Dino Sinovčić; Croatia	Matías de Andrade; Argentina	Antonio Fantin; Italy
S7	Andrii Trusov; Ukraine	Federico Bicelli; Italy	Iñaki Basiloff; Argentina
S8	Robert Griswold; United States	Iñigo Llopis Sanz; Spain	Pipo Carlomagno; Argentina
S9	Simone Barlaam; Italy	Ugo Didier; France	Timothy Hodge; Australia
S10	Stefano Raimondi; Italy	Riccardo Menciotti; Italy	Alec Elliot; Canada
S11	Mykhailo Serbin; Ukraine	Rogier Dorsman; Netherlands	Marco Meneses; Portugal
S12	Stephen Clegg; Great Britain	Raman Salei; Azerbaijan	Borja Sanz Tamayo; Spain
S13	Nicolas-Guy Turbide; Canada	Thomas van Wanrooij; Netherlands	Oleksii Virchenko; Ukraine
S14	Benjamin Hance; Australia	Gabriel Bandeira; Brazil	Alexander Hillhouse; Denmark

== Results ==
=== S6 ===
Final

Five swimmers from five nations took part.

Rank	Name	Nation	Result	Notes
1st place, gold medalist(s)	Dino Sinovčić	Croatia	1:16.83	
2nd place, silver medalist(s)	Matías de Andrade	Argentina	1:17.59	
3rd place, bronze medalist(s)	Antonio Fantin	Italy	1:19.86	
4	David Sanchez Sierra	Spain	1:20.39	
5	Daniel Videira	Portugal	1:22.27	

=== S7 ===
Final

Seven swimmers from six nations took part.

Rank	Name	Nation	Result	Notes
1st place, gold medalist(s)	Andrii Trusov	Ukraine	1:09.46	
2nd place, silver medalist(s)	Federico Bicelli	Italy	1:12.06	
3rd place, bronze medalist(s)	Iñaki Basiloff	Argentina	1:12.86	
4	Christian Sadie	South Africa	1:15.84	AF
5	Lucas Nicolas Poggi	Argentina	1:17.52	
6	Rudy Garcia-Tolson	United States	1:18.74	
7	Ádám Szabady	Hungary	1:21.84	

=== S8 ===
Heats

11 swimmers from nine nations took part. The swimmers with the top eight times, regardless of heat, advanced to the final.

Rank	Heat	Lane	Name	Nation	Result	Notes
1	2	4	Robert Griswold	United States	1:07.81	Q
2	1	4	Iñigo Llopis Sanz	Spain	1:09.05	Q
3	1	3	Sergio Salvador Martos Minguet	Spain	1:10.90	Q
4	2	5	Pipo Carlomagno	Argentina	1:11.79	Q
5	2	2	Felix Cowan	Canada	1:12.16	Q
6	2	3	Mark Malyar	Israel	1:13.37	Q
7	2	6	Matthew Torres	United States	1:13.74	Q
8	1	6	Sam Downie	Great Britain	1:14.58	Q
9	1	5	Jurijs Semjonovs	Latvia	1:15.21	
10	1	2	Petr Fryba	Czech Republic	1:15.25	
11	2	7	Zach Zona	Canada	1:15.92	

Final

The final was held on 132 June 2022.

Rank	Athlete	Nation	Result	Notes
1st place, gold medalist(s)	Robert Griswold	United States	1:03.82	
2nd place, silver medalist(s)	Iñigo Llopis Sanz	Spain	1:07.92	
3rd place, bronze medalist(s)	Pipo Carlomagno	Argentina	1:10.91	
4	Sergio Salvador Martos Minguet	Spain	1:11.71	
5	Matthew Torres	United States	1:11.95	
6	Felix Cowan	Canada	1:13.58	
7	Sam Downie	Great Britain	1:13.63	
	Mark Malyar	Israel	DSQ	

=== S12 ===
Final

Five swimmers from five nations took part.

Rank	Name	Nation	Result	Notes
1st place, gold medalist(s)	Stephen Clegg	United Kingdom	1:00.03	
2nd place, silver medalist(s)	Raman Salei	Azerbaijan	1:00.71	
3rd place, bronze medalist(s)	Borja Sanz Tamayo	Spain	1:09.52	
4	Colin Jin Guang Soon	Singapore	1:12.29	
5	Mustafa Aslan	Turkey	1:15.62	

=== S13 ===
Final

Eight swimmers from seven nations took part.

Rank	Name	Nation	Result	Notes
1st place, gold medalist(s)	Nicolas-Guy Turbide	Canada	1:00.17	
2nd place, silver medalist(s)	Thomas van Wanrooij	Netherlands	1:00.55	
3rd place, bronze medalist(s)	Oleksii Virchenko	Ukraine	1:00.95	
4	Alex Portal	France	1:01.77	
5	Enrique José Alhambra Mollar	Spain	1:02.23	
6	Kirill Pankov	Uzbekistan	1:02.66	
7	Kyrylo Garashchenko	Ukraine	1:03.63	
8	Genki Saito	Japan	1:05.07	

=== S14 ===
Final

Rank	Name	Nation	Result	Notes
1st place, gold medalist(s)	Simone Barlaam			
2nd place, silver medalist(s)	Ugo Didier			
3rd place, bronze medalist(s)	Timothy Hodge			
4	Barry McClements			
5	Lucas Lamente Mozela			
6	Sam De Visser			
7	Simone Ciulli			
8	Jacobo Garrido Brun			
9	Jonas Kesnar			
