= Swimming at the 2020 Summer Paralympics – Men's 400 metre freestyle S8 =

Men's 400 metre freestyle S8 at the XVI Paralympic Games
- Venue: Tokyo Aquatics Centre
- Dates: 31 August 2021
- Competitors: 9 from 8 nations

Medalists
1st place, gold medalist(s)		Andrei Nikolaev	RPC
2nd place, silver medalist(s)		Alberto Amodeo	Italy
3rd place, bronze medalist(s)		Matthew Torres	United States

The men's 400 metre freestyle S8 event at the 2020 Paralympic Games took place on 31 August 2021, at the Tokyo Aquatics Centre.

== Heats ==
The swimmers with the top eight times, regardless of heat, advanced to the final.

Rank	Heat	Lane	Name	Nationality	Time	Notes
1	1	4	Matthew Torres	United States	4:31.77	Q
2	2	5	Andrei Nikolaev	RPC	4:31.88	Q
3	2	3	Robert Griswold	United States	4:34.35	Q
4	2	4	Xu Haijiao	China	4:34.47	Q
5	2	6	Caio Amorim	Brazil	4:38.44	Q
6	1	5	Alberto Amodeo	Italy	4:39.52	Q
7	1	6	Iñigo Llopis Sanz	Spain	4:44.19	Q
8	1	3	Ben Popham	Australia	4:45.05	Q
9	2	2	Zach Zona	Canada	4:49.09	

== Final ==
400m freestyle final
Rank	Lane	Name	Nationality	Time	Notes
1st place, gold medalist(s)	5	Andrei Nikolaev	RPC	4.25.16	
2nd place, silver medalist(s)	7	Alberto Amodeo	Italy	4.25.93	
3rd place, bronze medalist(s)	4	Matthew Torres	United States	4.28.47	
4	6	Xu Haijiao	China	4.29.93	
5	3	Robert Griswold	United States	4.31.96	
6	2	Caio Amorim	Brazil	4.35.16	
7	1	Iñigo Llopis Sanz	Spain	4.45.69	
8	8	Ben Popham	Australia	4.49.32	
