= Swimming at the 2020 Summer Paralympics – Men's 400 metre freestyle S9 =

Men's 400 metre freestyle S9 at the XVI Paralympic Games
- Venue: Tokyo Aquatics Centre
- Dates: 25 August 2021
- Competitors: 13 from 9 nations

Medalists
1st place, gold medalist(s)		William Martin	Australia
2nd place, silver medalist(s)		Ugo Didier	France
3rd place, bronze medalist(s)		Alexander Tuckfield	Australia

The Men's 400 metre freestyle S9 event at the 2020 Paralympic Games took place on 25 August 2021, at the Tokyo Aquatics Centre.

== Records ==
World record	Brenden Hall (AUS)	4:09.93	Montreal, Canada	16 August 2013
Paralympic record	William Martin (AUS)	4:10.25	Tokyo, Japan	25 August 2021

== Heats ==
The swimmers with the top 8 times, regardless of heat, advanced to the final.

Rank	Heat	Lane	Name	Nationality	Time	Notes
1	2	5	Alexander Tuckfield	Australia	4:14.26	Q
2	2	4	Ugo Didier	France	4:15.23	Q
3	1	3	Simone Barlaam	Italy	4:17.95	Q
4	1	6	William Martin	Australia	4:17.99	Q
5	1	4	Brenden Hall	Australia	4:19.30	Q
6	1	5	Jacobo Garrido	Spain	4:20.28	Q
7	2	3	Federico Morlacchi	Italy	4:25.33	Q
8	2	6	Igor Hrehorowicz	Poland	4:26.13	Q
9	2	7	Barry McClements	Ireland	4:27.11	
10	2	2	David Grachat	Portugal	4:27.96	
11	1	2	José Antonio Mari	Spain	4:28.70	
12	2	1	Jesse Reynolds	New Zealand	4:30.34	
13	1	7	Jonáš Kešnar	Czech Republic	4:33.76	

== Final ==
400m freestyle final
Rank	Lane	Name	Nationality	Time	Notes
1st place, gold medalist(s)	6	William Martin	Australia	4:10.25	PR
2nd place, silver medalist(s)	5	Ugo Didier	France	4:11.33	
3rd place, bronze medalist(s)	4	Alexander Tuckfield	Australia	4:13.54	
4	2	Brenden Hall	Australia	4:14.48	
5	7	Jacobo Garrido	Spain	4:17.41	
6	3	Simone Barlaam	Italy	4:22.40	
7	1	Federico Morlacchi	Italy	4:24.75	
7	8	Igor Hrehorowicz	Poland	4:24.75	

== See also ==
- Swimming at the 2016 Summer Paralympics – Men's 400 metre freestyle S9
