= 2020 World Para Swimming European Open Championships – Men's 400 metre freestyle =

The men's 400m freestyle events at the 2020 World Para Swimming European Championships were held at the Penteada Olympic Pools Complex.

== Medalists ==
Event	Gold	Silver	Bronze
S6	Antonio Fantin; Italy	Andrei Granichka; Russia	Viacheslav Lenskii; Russia
S7	Andrii Trusov; Russia	Federico Bicelli; Italy	Mark Malyar; Israel
S8	Andrei Nikolaev; Russia	Alberto Amodeo; Italy	Inigo Llopis Sanz; Spain
S9	Ugo Didier; France	Jacobo Garrido Brun; Spain	Simone Barlaam; Italy
S10	Maksym Krypak; Ukraine	Stefano Raimondi; Italy	Alan Ogorzalek; Poland
S11	Mykhailo Serbin; Ukraine	Viktor Smyrnov; Ukraine	Hryhory Zudzilau; Belarus
S13	Ihar Boki; Belarus	Alex Portal; France	Kyrylo Garashchenko; Ukraine

== Results ==
=== S7 ===
Final

Rank	Name	Nationality	Time	Notes
1st place, gold medalist(s)	Andrii Trusov	Russia	4:42.88	
2nd place, silver medalist(s)	Federico Bicelli	Italy	4:44.90	
3rd place, bronze medalist(s)	Mark Malyar	Israel	4:46.48	
4	Michael Jones	Great Britain	4:48.38	
5	Marian Kvasnytsia	Ukraine	5:05.90	
6	Martin Batka	Slovakia	6:10.89	

=== S8 ===
Final

Rank	Name	Nationality	Time	Notes
1st place, gold medalist(s)	Andrei Nikolaev	Russia	4:30.64	
2nd place, silver medalist(s)	Alberto Amodeo	Italy	4:39.04	
3rd place, bronze medalist(s)	Inigo Llopis Sanz	Spain	4:47.02	
4	Denys Dubrov	Ukraine	4:53.10	
5	Bohdan Hrynenko	Ukraine	4:53.45	
6	Islam Dokaev	Belgium	5:19.31	
7	Petr Fryba	Czech Republic	5:21.76	
—	Jonathan McGrath	Ireland		DSQ

=== S10 ===
Final

Rank	Name	Nationality	Time	Notes
1st place, gold medalist(s)	Maksym Krypak	Ukraine	4:02.64	
2nd place, silver medalist(s)	Stefano Raimondi	Italy	4:11.72	
3rd place, bronze medalist(s)	Alan Ogorzalek	Poland	4:15.11	
4	Florent Marais	France	4:17.74	
5	Dmitrii Bartasinskii	Russia	4:17.99	
6	Justin Kaps	Germany	4:22.87	
7	Jarno Thierens	Belgium	4:34.24	
8	Matej Petrlic	Croatia	4:40.29	
