= 2020 World Para Swimming European Open Championships – Men's 100 metre backstroke =

The men's 100 metre backstroke events at the 2020 World Para Swimming European Championships were held at the Penteada Olympic Pools Complex in Funchal, Madeira, Portugal between 16–22 May 2021.

== Medalists ==
Event	Gold	Silver	Bronze
S1	Francesco Bettella; Italy	Anton Kol; Ukraine	Iyad Shalabi; Israel
S2	Alberto Abarza; Chile	Vladimir Danilenko; Russia	Jacek Czech; Poland
S6	Laurent Chardard; France	Dino Sinovčić; Croatia	Antonio Fantin; Italy
S7	Mark Malyar; Israel	Federico Bicelli; Italy	Andrii Trusov; Ukraine
S8	Inigo Llopis Sanz; Spain	Bohdan Hrynenko; Ukraine	Sergio Salvador Martos Minguet; Spain
S9	Bogdan Mozgovoi; Russia	Ugo Didier; France	Yahor Shchalkanau; Belarus
S10	Maksym Krypak; Ukraine	Stefano Raimondi; Italy	Riccardo Menciotti; Italy
S11	Mykhailo Serbin; Ukraine	Wojciech Makowski; Poland	Oleksandr Artiukhov; Ukraine
S12	Raman Salei; Azerbaijan	Maksim Vashkevich; Belarus	Roman Makarov; Russia
S13	Ihar Boki; Belarus	Alex Portal; France	Oleksii Virchenko; Ukraine
S14	Gabriel Bandeira; Brazil	Viacheslav Emeliantsev; Russia	Vasyl Krainyk; Ukraine

== Results ==
=== S6 ===
Heats

Rank	Heat	Name	Nationality	Time	Notes
1	2	Dino Sinovčić	Croatia	1:17.70	Q
2	1	Laurent Chardard	France	1:18.36	Q
3	2	Antonio Fantin	Italy	1:19.41	Q
4	2	Adam Szabady	Hungary	1:20.97	Q
5	1	Fabian Brune	Germany	1:21.90	Q
6	1	Daniel Videira	Portugal	1:21.98	Q
7	1	Viacheslav Lenskii	Russia	1:23.36	Q
8	2	Andrei Granichka	Russia	1:24.27	Q
9	2	Oleksandr Komarov	Ukraine	1:25.21	
10	1	Iurii Luchkin	Russia	1:26.78	
11	2	Patrick Flanagan	Ireland	1:28.93	
12	1	Tim Znidarsic Svensek	Slovenia	1:35.33	
13	2	Radomir Pacak	Slovakia	2:01.02	

Final

Rank	Name	Nationality	Time	Notes
1st place, gold medalist(s)	Laurent Chardard	France	1:16.19	
2nd place, silver medalist(s)	Dino Sinovčić	Croatia	1:16.48	
3rd place, bronze medalist(s)	Antonio Fantin	Italy	1:20.77	
4	Viacheslav Lenskii	Russia	1:21.21	
5	Fabian Brune	Germany	1:21.74	
6	Daniel Videira	Portugal	1:21.90	
7	Adam Szabady	Hungary	1:22.20	
8	Andrei Granichka	Russia	1:24.25	

=== S12 ===
Final

Rank	Name	Nationality	Time	Notes
1st place, gold medalist(s)	Raman Salei	Azerbaijan	1:01.57	
2nd place, silver medalist(s)	Maksim Vashkevich	Belarus	1:02.90	
3rd place, bronze medalist(s)	Roman Makarov	Russia	1:03.25	
4	Sergii Klippert	Ukraine	1:03.51	
5	Charalampos Taiganidis	Greece	1:04.30	
6	Uladzimir Sotnikau	Belarus	1:04.84	
7	Artur Saifutdinov	Russia	1:06.68	
