= Swimming at the 2020 Summer Paralympics – Men's 100 metre backstroke S8 =

Men's 100 metre backstroke S8 at the XVI Paralympic Games
- Venue: Tokyo Aquatics Centre
- Dates: 27 August 2021
- Competitors: 11 from 10 nations

Medalists
1st place, gold medalist(s)		Robert Griswold	United States
2nd place, silver medalist(s)		Iñigo Llopis Sanz	Spain
3rd place, bronze medalist(s)		Liu Fengqi	China

The Men's 100 metre backstroke S8 event at the 2020 Paralympic Games took place on 27 August 2021, at the Tokyo Aquatics Centre.

== Records ==
World record	Zhou Cong (CHN)	1:08.92	Rio de Janeiro, Brazil	13 September 2016
Paralympic record	Zhou Cong (CHN)	1:09.86	Rio de Janeiro, Brazil	13 September 2016

== Heats ==
The swimmers with the top 8 times, regardless of heat, advanced to the final.

=== Heat 1 ===
Rank	Lane	Name	Nationality	Time	Notes
1	4	Iñigo Llopis Sanz	Spain	1:07.90	Q
2	5	Liu Fengqi	China	1:08.57	Q
3	2	Joseph Peppersack	United States	1:09.30	Q
4	3	Pavel Kuklin	RPC	1:09.77	Q
5	6	Matthew Torres	United States	1:14.03	

=== Heat 2 ===
Rank	Lane	Name	Nationality	Time	Notes
1	4	Robert Griswold	United States	1:05.49	Q
2	5	Jesse Aungles	Australia	1:08.28	Q
3	3	Jurijs Semjonovs	Latvia	1:09.88	Q
3	6	Kota Kubota	Japan	1:09.88	Q
5	2	Sergio Salvador Martos Minguet	Spain	1:12.15	
6	7	Diogo Cancela	Portugal	1:15.63	

== Final ==
Rank	Lane	Name	Nationality	Time	Notes
1st place, gold medalist(s)	4	Robert Griswold	United States	1:02.55	WR
2nd place, silver medalist(s)	5	Iñigo Llopis Sanz	Spain	1:06.82	
3rd place, bronze medalist(s)	6	Liu Fengqi	China	1:07.09	
4	3	Jesse Aungles	Australia	1:07.94	
5	8	Kota Kubota	Japan	1:09.09	
6	7	Pavel Kuklin	RPC	1:09.26	
7	2	Joseph Peppersack	United States	1:09.45	
8	1	Jurijs Semjonovs	Latvia	1:10.44	
