= 2018 World Para Swimming European Championships – Men's 100 metres freestyle =

The men's 100 metres freestyle at the 2018 World Para Swimming European Championships was held at the National Aquatic Centre in Dublin from 13 to 19 August. 10 classification finals are held in all over this event.

== Medalists ==
Event	Gold		Silver		Bronze	
S4	Ami Omer Dadaon (ISR)	1:25.40	Michael Schoenmaker (NED)	1:27.03	David Smetanine (FRA)	1:28.55
S5	Antonio Fantin (ITA)	1:07.73 WR	Francesco Bocciardo (ITA)	1:08.78	Stephan Fuhrer (SUI)	1:12.38
S6	Thijs van Hofweegen (NED)	1:06.08	Oleksandr Komarov (UKR)	1:06.81	Daniel Videira (POR)	1:09.87
S7	Federico Bicelli (ITA)	1:02.45	Ievgenii Bogodaiko (UKR)	1:02.73	Andrii Trusov (UKR)	1:04.19
S8	Michal Golus (POL)	1:01.70	Inigo Llopis Sanz (ESP)	1:02.76	Sergio Martos (ESP)	1:03.44
S9	Simone Barlaam (ITA)	54.42 ER	Lewis White (GBR)	56.29	Federico Morlacchi (ITA)	56.69
S10	Maksym Krypak (UKR)	50.92 ER	Stefano Raimondi (ITA)	51.99	Denys Dubrov (UKR)	52.21
S11	Hryhory Zudzilau (BLR)	59.97	Wojciech Makowski (POL)	1:01.29	Vyktor Smyrnov (UKR)	1:03.28
S12	Iaroslav Denysenko (UKR)	51.72	Maksym Veraksa (UKR)	53.12	Stephen Clegg (GBR)	54.77
S13	Ihar Boki (BLR)	50.65 WR	Kyrylo Garashchenko (UKR)	52.57	Ivan Salgeuro (ESP)	55.11
WR world record | AR area record | CR championship record | GR games record | NR national record | OR Olympic record | PB personal best | SB season best | WL world leading (in a given season)

== See also ==
- List of IPC world records in swimming
