= 2019 World Para Swimming Championships – Men's 400 metre freestyle =

The men's 400m freestyle events at the 2019 World Para Swimming Championships were held in the London Aquatics Centre at the Queen Elizabeth Olympic Park in London between 9–15 September.

== Medalists ==
Event	Gold	Silver	Bronze
S6	Antonio Fantin; Italy	Andrei Granichka; Russia	Viacheslav Lenskii; Russia
S7	Mark Malyar; Israel	Andrii Trusov; Ukraine	Inaki Basiloff; Argentina
S8	Andrei Nikolaev; Russia	Robert Griswold; United States	Zhou Zhihua; China
S9	Jacobo Garrido Brun; Spain	Brenden Hall; Australia	Ugo Didier; France
S10	Maksym Krypak; Ukraine	Bas Takken; Netherlands	Alexander Elliot; Canada
S11	Rogier Dorsman; Netherlands	Uchu Tomita; Japan	Hua Dongdong; China
S13	Ihar Boki; Belarus	Kyrylo Garashchenko; Ukraine	Alex Portal; France
