= Swimming at the 2020 Summer Paralympics – Men's 400 metre freestyle S6 =

Men's 400 metre freestyle S6 at the XVI Paralympic Games
- Venue: Tokyo Aquatics Centre
- Dates: 2 September 2021
- Competitors: 13 from 11 nations

Medalists
1st place, gold medalist(s)		Talisson Glock	Brazil
2nd place, silver medalist(s)		Antonio Fantin	Italy
3rd place, bronze medalist(s)		Viacheslav Lenskii	RPC

The men's 400 metre freestyle S6 event at the 2020 Paralympic Games took place on 2 September 2021, at the Tokyo Aquatics Centre.

== Heats ==
The swimmers with the top eight times, regardless of heat, advanced to the final.

Rank	Heat	Lane	Name	Nationality	Time	Notes
1	1	4	Talisson Glock	Brazil	5:06.28	Q
2	1	3	Viacheslav Lenskii	RPC	5:11.07	Q
3	2	4	Antonio Fantin	Italy	5:12.08	Q
4	2	5	Juan Gutierrez Bermudez	Mexico	5:14.10	Q
5	1	5	Andrei Granichka	RPC	5:15.38	Q
6	2	3	Raul Gutierrez Bermudez	Mexico	5:26.10	Q
7	1	6	Lorenzo Perez Escalona	Cuba	5:26.57	Q
8	2	6	Daniel Videira	Portugal	5:26.88	Q
9	2	7	Zach Shattuck	United States	5:29.95	
10	2	2	Nelson Crispín	Colombia	5:36.25	
11	1	2	Leo McCrea	Switzerland	5:40.08	
12	2	1	Patrick Flanagan	Ireland	5:40.48	
13	1	7	Gary Bejino	Philippines	5:52.28	

== Final ==
400m freestyle final
Rank	Lane	Name	Nationality	Time	Notes
1st place, gold medalist(s)	4	Talisson Glock	Brazil	4.54.42	AM
2nd place, silver medalist(s)	3	Antonio Fantin	Italy	4.55.70	
3rd place, bronze medalist(s)	5	Viacheslav Lenskii	RPC	5.04.80	
4	2	Andrei Granichka	RPC	5.05.30	
5	6	Juan Gutierrez Bermudez	Mexico	5:15.23	
6	8	Daniel Videira	Portugal	5:24.92	
7	7	Raul Gutierrez Bermudez	Mexico	5:26.10	
8	1	Lorenzo Perez Escalona	Cuba	5:30.42	
