= Alexander Tuckfield =

Australian Paralympic swimmer

Personal information
- Nationality: Australia
- Born: 5 November 2004 (age 21)

Sport
- Sport: Swimming
- Classifications: S10, SB9, SM10
- Club: Aquablitz Toongabbie
- Coach: Gavin Stewart
Medal record
Paralympic swimming
Representing Australia
Paralympic Games
Bronze medal – third place	2020 Tokyo	400 m freestyle S9
World Championships
Bronze medal – third place	2025 Singapore	400 m freestyle S10
Para Pan Pacific Championships
Bronze medal – third place	2026 Walnut, USA	50 m freestyle S10

Alexander Tuckfield (born 5 November 2004) is an Australian Paralympic swimmer with cerebral palsy At the 2020 Tokyo Paralympics, he won a bronze medal

== Swimming ==
Tuckfield who was born on 5 November 2004 and has cerebral palsy. He began swimming at the age of ten.

At the 2020 Swimming Australia Virtual Championships, he broke the Men's 200m Freestyle S9 world record.

Tuckfield finished second in the Men's 400 m S9 at 2021 Australian Swimming Trials and qualified for the 2020 Summer Paralympics.

At the 2020 Tokyo Paralympics, Tuckfield qualified first in his heat and then won the bronze medal in the Men's 400 m freestyle S9. His time of 4:13.54 was three-and-a-half seconds slower than the gold medal winner William Martin of Australia. He also swam in the 50 m freestyle S9 but failed to qualify for the final.

At the 2024 European Para Swimming Championships in Madeira, Tuckfield took Bronze in the Men's 100 m Freestyle S10, and swam the second leg in the mixed 4 × 100 m Freestyle 34pts where the team took the bronze and set an OC Record with a time of 4:11.56

At the 2025 World Para Swimming Championships in Singapore, he won the bronze medal in the Men's 400 m Freestyle S10.

At the 2026 Para Pan Pacific championships in Walnut California, he won the bronze medal in the Men’s 50m freestyle S10.
