= Rowan Crothers =

Australian Paralympic swimmer

Rowan Crothers OAM
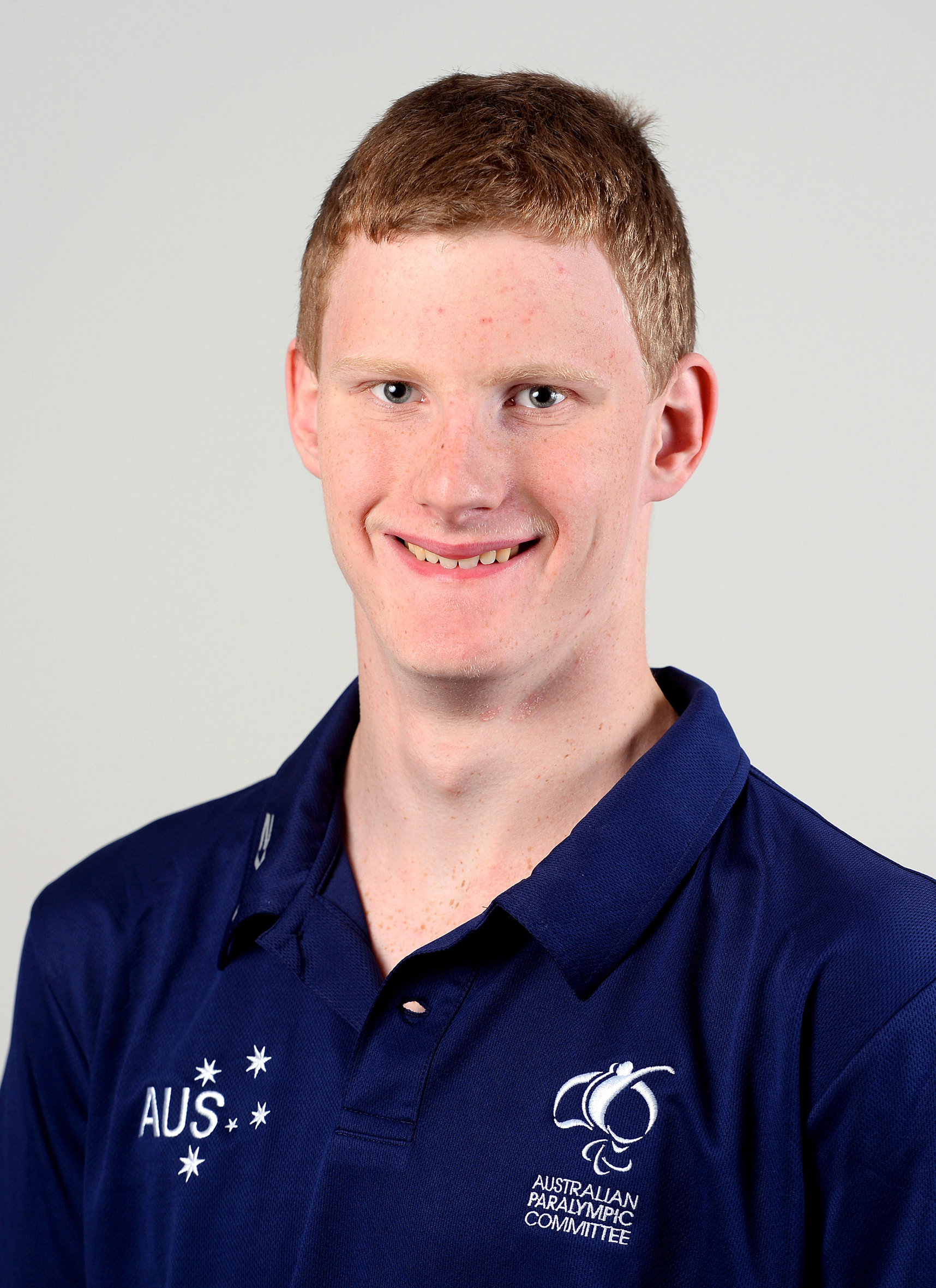
- 2016 Australian Paralympic team portrait

Personal information
- Full name: Rowan Crothers
- Nickname: Magnet / Magnetbrain
- Nationality: Australia
- Born: 24 October 1997 (age 29) Gosford, New South Wales, Australia
- Height: 196 cm (6 ft 5 in)
- Weight: 77 kg (170 lb)

Sport
- Sport: Swimming
- Strokes: Freestyle
- Classifications: S10, SB9, SM10
- Club: Yeronga Park
- Coach: Kate Sparkes
Medal record
Men's Paralympic swimming
Representing Australia
Paralympic Games
Gold medal – first place	2020 Tokyo	50 m freestyle S10
Gold medal – first place	2020 Tokyo	4×100 m freestyle 34 pts
Silver medal – second place	2020 Tokyo	100 m freestyle S10
Silver medal – second place	2024 Paris	100 m freestyle S10
Silver medal – second place	2024 Paris	Mixed 4×100 m freestyle relay 34pts
Bronze medal – third place	2024 Paris	50 m freestyle S10
World Championships
Gold medal – first place	2013 Montreal	4×100 m freestyle 34 points
Gold medal – first place	2022 Madeira	50 m freestyle S10
Gold medal – first place	2022 Madeira	100 m freestyle S10
Gold medal – first place	2023 Manchester	50 m freestyle S10
Gold medal – first place	2023 Manchester	100 m freestyle S10
Gold medal – first place	2025 Singapore	50 m freestyle S10
Gold medal – first place	2025 Singapore	100 m freestyle S10
Gold medal – first place	2025 Singapore	Mixed 4×100 m freestyle relay 34 pts
Bronze medal – third place	2013 Montreal	100 m freestyle S9
Bronze medal – third place	2019 London	50 m freestyle S10
Bronze medal – third place	2019 London	100 m freestyle S10
Bronze medal – third place	2019 London	4x100m freestyle 34 points
Commonwealth Games
Gold medal – first place	2014 Glasgow	100 m freestyle S9

Rowan Crothers (born 24 October 1997) is an Australian freestyle swimmer. He represented Australia at the 2016 Rio Paralympics, 2020 Tokyo Paralympics and 2024 Paris Paralympics. He won two gold and one silver medals at the Tokyo Paralympics and two silver and one bronze medals at Paris Paralympics.

== Personal life ==
Crothers was born 15 weeks prematurely on 24 October 1997 in Gosford on the New South Wales Central Coast and currently lives in Moorooka, Queensland.

Rowan attended Newmarket State School, Kelvin Grove State College and St Laurence's College.

Crothers' prematurity resulted in him developing cerebral palsy due to IVH, and bronchopulmonary dysplasia causing permanent lung scarring. His Cerebral Palsy (spastic diplegia) impacts his coordination and motor control predominantly in his lower body, however his upper body is also affected to a lesser extent. Crothers requires a vehicle modified with hand controls to legally drive and is currently working towards obtaining a full licence. In the pool, CP impacts the effectiveness of his kick and ability to control body positioning. He has worked consistently on perfecting a propulsion style to make the most out of what coordination he has.

Crothers features in the 2020 documentary No Distinguishing Features which .." follows the stories of six people living with disabilities from across Australia and New Zealand. Six people who were given a strict roadmap for their life the moment they were born. Six people who went on to tear that roadmap to shreds."

== Career ==
Crothers has been a member of the Yeronga Park Swim Club since 2012 where he initially trained under Rick Van Der Zant. He is currently trained by Kate Sparkes. Notable members of his training squad include or have included Ryan Pini, Lorna Tonks and Chelsea Gubecka.

Crothers made his international swimming debut as a 13-year-old at the 2011 Arafura Games where he claimed a bronze medal in the Men's 400 m MC freestyle and broke 4 Australian National Age Records in the 50m, 100 m, 200 m and 400 m freestyle events in the S9 classification. He went on to claim S9 Australian National Age Records in freestyle as a 13, 14, 15 and 16 year old in the 50 m, 100 m, 200 m, and the 400 m freestyle.

At the 2013 Australian Short Course Championships, Crothers broke the men's S9 World Record for the 400 m SC freestyle.

In 2014 at the Australian Swimming Championships, Crothers broke World Records in the S9 100 m freestyle twice, and another in the S9 200 m freestyle. These swims qualified him for the 2014 Australian Commonwealth Games Swim Team and the 2014 Para Pan Pacs Team. Crothers went on to win Gold at the 2014 Commonwealth Games breaking his own World Record

In 2016 Crothers was reclassified from S9 to S10 which was a major adjustment. He went on to compete at the 2016 Rio Paralympics in four events and qualified for the finals in each. He placed fifth in the Men's 4 × 100 m Freestyle (34 points), sixth in Men's 400 m Freestyle S10, fifth in Men's 100 m Freestyle S10 and sixth in Men's 50 m Freestyle S10.

At the 2019 World Para Swimming Championships, he won the bronze medals in the Men's 50 m and 100 m Freestyle S10.

In 2021, Crothers swam at the delayed 2020 Tokyo Paralympic Games winning gold in the 50 m Freestyle S10 with a time of 23.21, and silver in the 100 m Freestyle S10 with a time of 51,37. Crothers won gold in the Men's 4 × 100 m freestyle 34 pts along with William Martin, Matt Levy and Ben Popham, breaking the current World Record by almost 2 seconds.

Crothers won two gold medals – Men's 50 m Freestyle and Men's 100m Freestyle at both the 2022 World Para Swimming Championships, Madeira and 2023 World Para Swimming Championships, Manchester, England.

At the 2024 Paris Paralympic Games, he won two silver medals – Men's 100m Freestyle S10 and the Mixed 4 × 100 m Freestyle 34 pts and bronze medal in the Men's 50m Freesatyle S10.

At the 2025 World Para Swimming Championships in Singapore, he won three gold medals – Men's 50m and 100 m Freestyle S10 and the Mixed 4 × 100 m Freestyle 34 pts.

=== National Open Competition Medals ===
2012 Australian Open Swimming Championships

Silver – Men 12 & Over 400 LC Metre Freestyle Multi-Class

2013 Australian Open Water Championships

- Silver – Men 5K Open Water Multi-Class

2013 Australian Open Swimming Championships

- Silver – Male 400 LC Metre Freestyle Multi-Class
- Bronze – Male 100 LC Metre Freestyle Multi-Class

2013 Australian Open Short Course Swimming Championships

- Gold – Men's Open 400 SC Metre Freestyle Multi-Class (WR)

2014 Australian Open Swimming Championships

- Gold – Men's 100m freestyle Para Sport S9 (WR)
- Gold – Men's Open 100 LC Metre Freestyle Multi-Class (WR)
- Silver – Men's Open 400 LC Metre Freestyle Multi-Class
- Gold – Men's Open 200 LC Metre Freestyle Multi-Class (WR)

2016 Australian Open Swimming Championships

- Silver – Men's Open 400 LC Metre Freestyle Multi-Class
- Silver – 4 × 50 m MC freestyle relay
- 2017 Australian Open Swimming Championships
- Bronze – Men's Open 50 LC Metre Freestyle Multi-Class

2019 Australian Open Swimming Championships

- Gold – Men's Open 50 LC Metre Freestyle Multi-Class
- Gold – Men's Open 100 LC Metre Freestyle Multi-Class

=== Awards ===
- 2009 Best Novice Athlete – Sporting Wheelies and Disabled Association
- 2009/10 North-West Regional Finalist – Quest Youngstar Award for Sport
- 2010 Most Improved Junior Athlete – Sporting Wheelies and Disabled Association
- 2010/11 North-West Regional Finalist – Quest Youngstar Award for Sport
- 2010 Roy Fowler Male Swimmer of the Meet – Queensland AWD Swimming Championships
- 2011 Best Junior Athlete – Sporting Wheelies and Disabled Association
- 2011 Swimmer of the Meet State Multi-Class Swimming Championships – Queensland Swimming
- 2011/12 North-West Regional Winner – Quest Youngstar Award for Sport
- 2012 Swimmer of the Meet State Multi-Class Swimming Championships – Queensland Swimming
- 2013 RSL Youth Development Program Grant Recipient
- 2013 Brisbane Swimming Association Swimmer with a Disability for 2012/13
- 2014 Brisbane Swimming Association President's Award for 2013/14 (Glen Bigg Trophy)
- 2014 Junior and Senior Male Athlete of the Year – Sporting Wheelies and Disabled Association
- 2017 – Swimming Australia Paralympic Program Swimmer of the Year.
- 2022 – Medal of the Order of Australia
- 2022 – Swimming Australia Paralympic Program Swimmer of the Year
- 2023 – Swimming Australia Paralympic Program Swimmer of the Year
- 2025 - South Australian Sports Institute Male Para Athlete of the Year
