= Querijn Hensen =

Dutch para swimmer

Personal information
- Home town: Amersfoort, Netherlands

Sport
- Country: Netherlands
- Sport: Para swimming
- Disability: Juvenile idiopathic arthritis
- Disability class: S10, SB9, SM10
- Strokes: Backstroke; Freestyle

Querijn Hensen is a Dutch para swimmer. He competes in backstroke and freestyle events in the S10, SB9, SM10 classification events. He represented the Netherlands at the 2020 Summer Paralympics and has competed at the World Para Swimming Championships.

== Early and personal life ==
Querijn Hensen is from Amersfoort in the Netherlands. As a child, he was diagnosed with juvenile idiopathic arthritis after experiencing persistent pain and swelling in his knee. He was treated by Nico Wulffraat at the Wilhelmina Children's Hospital. As a child, he played football, but his condition eventually prevented him from continuing to participate in active sport. He subsequently took up swimming to reduce pain and improve mobility, and later developed a competitive para swimming career.

Hensen has spoken publicly about the challenges of training to be an elite swimmer with the limitations imposed by the medical condition. He has said that the condition has sometimes led him to perform below the optimal level. Outside sport, Hensen works as a human resources manager. Hensen identifies as LGBTQ.

== Career ==
Hensen competes in backstroke and freestyle events in the S10, SB9, SM10 classification events. In accordance with the qualification criteria established by the International Paralympic Committee and the NOC*NSF, Hansen competed at qualifying events held in Rotterdam and Eindhoven, in a bid to qualify for the 2020 Summer Paralympics.

In 2021, Hensen was selected to represent the Netherlands at the 2020 Summer Paralympics in Tokyo. At the 2020 Summer Paralympics, Hensen competed in three events–men's 50 metre freestyle S10, men's 100 metre backstroke S10, and men's 4 × 100 metre medley relay 34 points. In the 50 metre freestyle S10 event held on 25 August 2021, he finished fifth and last in his qualifying heat with a time of 25.58 seconds, and failed to advance to the final. In the men's 100 metre backstroke S10 event held on 2 September 2021, he advanced to the final after placing second in his heat with a time of 1:01.87. He finished sixth in the final with a time of 1:02.19. In the men's 4 × 100 metre medley relay 34 points, he was part of the Netherlands team that finished fifth in the final.
