= Jacobo Garrido Brun =

Spanish para swimmer (born 2002)

Personal information
- Nationality: Spanish
- Born: 23 August 2002 (age 24)

Sport
- Sport: Para swimming
- Disability class: S9, SM9
Medal record
Men's para swimming
Representing Spain
World Championships
Gold medal – first place	2019 London	400 m freestyle S9
Silver medal – second place	2025 Singapore	400 m freestyle S9
European Championships
Silver medal – second place	2020 Funchal	400 m freestyle S9
Silver medal – second place	2024 Funchal	400 m freestyle S9
Silver medal – second place	2026 Kocaeli	100 m butterfly S9
Bronze medal – third place	2018 Dublin	400 m freestyle S9

Jacobo Garrido Brun (born 23 August 2002) is a Spanish para swimmer. He represented Spain at the 2020 and 2024 Summer Paralympics.

== Career ==
Garrido represented Spain at the 2020 and 2024 Summer Paralympics. He made his World Para Swimming Championships debut in 2019 and won a gold medal in the 400 metre freestyle S9 event with a time of 4:17.17. He competed at the 2025 World Para Swimming Championships and won a silver medal in the 400 metre freestyle S9 event.
