= Daniil Smirnov =

Russian Paralympic swimmer

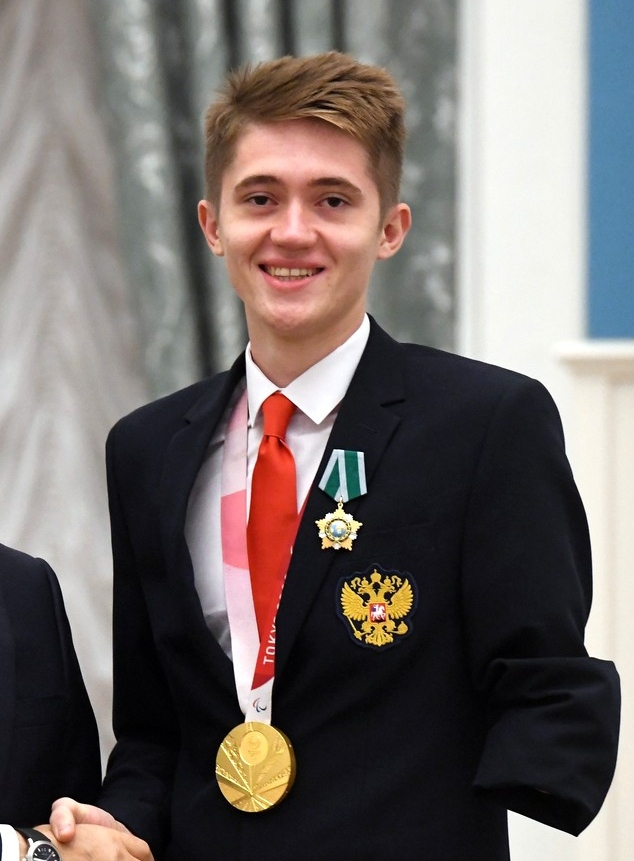

Personal information
- Nationality: Russian

Sport
- Sport: Para swimming
- Disability class: S9, SB8
- Club: Zarya Sports School of Olympic Reserve
- Coached by: Denis Dorogaev
Medal record
Men's para swimming
Representing RPC
Paralympic Games
Gold medal – first place	2020 Tokyo	4×100 m medley relay 34pts
Representing Neutral Paralympic Athletes
World Championships
Silver medal – second place	2025 Singapore	100 m breaststroke SB8
European Championships
Bronze medal – third place	2024 Funchal	100 m breaststroke SB8
Representing Russia
European Championships
Silver medal – second place	2026 Kocaeli	100 m breaststroke SB8

Daniil Smirnov (Russian: Даниил Смирнов) is a Russian para swimmer. He represented Russian Paralympic Committee athletes at the 2020 Summer Paralympics.

== Career ==
Smirov started his sport when he was 11. He received the title of master of sport for the Russian federation in 2017. Smirnov represented Russian Paralympic Committee athletes at the 2020 Summer Paralympics and won a gold medal in the men's 4 × 100 metre medley relay 34pts event.
