= Reid Maxwell =

Canadian para swimmer (born 2007)

Personal information
- Nationality: Canadian
- Born: September 2, 2007 (age 18)
- Home town: St. Albert, Alberta, Canada

Sport
- Sport: Para swimming
- Disability class: S8
Medal record
Men's para swimming
Representing Canada
Paralympic Games
Silver medal – second place	2024 Paris	400 m freestyle S8
World Championships
Silver medal – second place	2025 Singapore	200 m ind. medley SM8

Reid Maxwell (born September 2, 2007) is a Canadian para swimmer. He represented Canada at the 2024 Summer Paralympics.

== Early life ==
Maxwell was born without a lower right leg and has prune belly syndrome, a rare disorder characterized by a partial or complete lack of stomach muscles. He resides in St. Albert, Alberta.

== Career ==
During qualification for the 2024 Summer Paralympics, he set a Canadian record in the 400 metres S8 event with a time of 4:28:20. As a result, he qualified for the Paralympics. At the 2024 Summer Paralympics, he won a silver medal in the 400 metres freestyle S8 event.
