= Viacheslav Lenskii =

Russian Paralympic swimmer

Personal information
- Nationality: Russian
- Born: 17 August 1992 (age 33) Samara, Russia

Sport
- Sport: Paralympic swimming
- Disability class: S6
- Club: Samara Sports School of Olympic Reserve No.8
- Coached by: Larisa Oleynikova
Medal record
Paralympic swimming
Representing RPC
Paralympic Games
Bronze medal – third place	2020 Tokyo	400 m freestyle S6
Representing Russia
World Championships
Bronze medal – third place	2019 London	400 m freestyle S6

Viacheslav Lenskii (born 17 August 1992) is a Russian Paralympic swimmer who represented Russian Paralympic Committee athletes at the 2020 Summer Paralympics.

== Career ==
Lenskii represented Russian Paralympic Committee athletes at the 2020 Summer Paralympics in the 400 metre freestyle S6 event and won a bronze medal.
