= Alberto Amodeo =

Italian Paralympic swimmer (born 2000)

Personal information
- Nationality: Italian
- Born: 7 December 2000 (age 25)

Sport
- Sport: Para swimming
- Disability class: S8
- Club: Polha Varese
- Coached by: Micaela Biava; Massimiliano Tosin; Riccardo Vernole
Medal record
Men's para swimming
Representing Italy
Paralympic Games
Gold medal – first place	2024 Paris	400 m freestyle S8
Gold medal – first place	2024 Paris	100 m butterfly S8
Silver medal – second place	2020 Tokyo	400 m freestyle S8
Bronze medal – third place	2024 Paris	100 m freestyle S8
World Championships
Gold medal – first place	2023 Manchester	100 m butterfly S8
Gold medal – first place	2025 Singapore	400 m freestyle S8
Silver medal – second place	2022 Madeira	100 m butterfly S8
Silver medal – second place	2025 Singapore	100 m butterfly S8
Silver medal – second place	2025 Singapore	100 m freestyle S8
European Championships
Gold medal – first place	2024 Funchal	400 m freestyle S8
Gold medal – first place	2024 Funchal	100 m butterfly S8
Silver medal – second place	2020 Funchal	400 m freestyle S8
Silver medal – second place	2026 Kocaeli	400 m freestyle S8
Bronze medal – third place	2020 Funchal	100 m freestyle S8
Bronze medal – third place	2024 Funchal	4 × 50 m medley

Alberto Amodeo (born 7 December 2000) is an Italian Paralympic swimmer. He represented Italy at the 2020 and 2024 Summer Paralympics.

== Career ==
Amodeo represented Italy in the men's 400 metre freestyle S8 event at the 2020 Summer Paralympics and won a silver medal.
