= Ben Popham =

Australian Paralympic swimmer

Ben Popham OAM
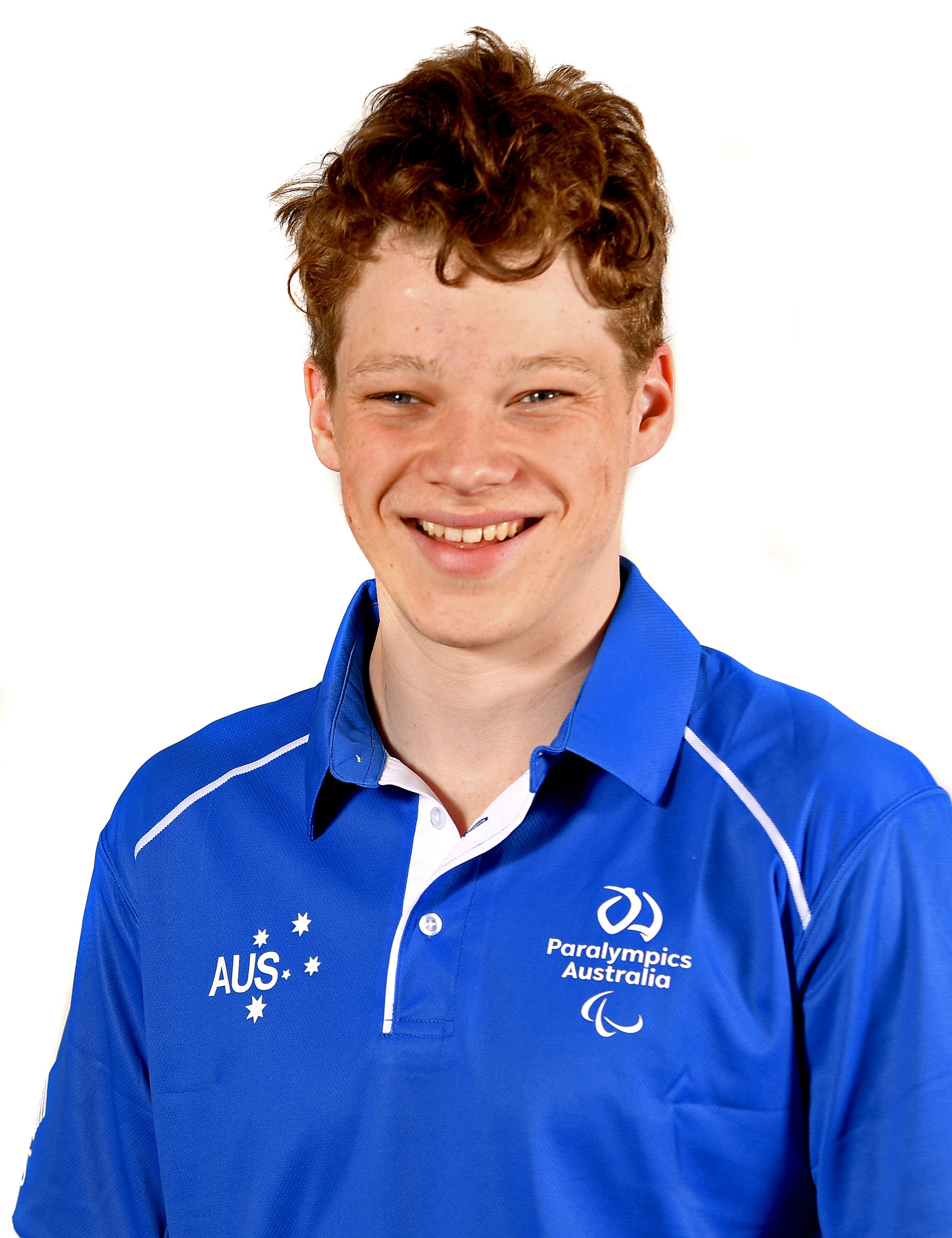
- Ben Popham in 2019

Personal information
- Nationality: Australian
- Born: 4 September 2000 (age 26)

Sport
- Country: Australia
- Sport: Paralympic swimming
- Disability class: S9 SB8, SM9
- Club: Arena Swim Club
- Coached by: Simon Redmond
Medal record
Representing Australia
Men's Swimming
Paralympic Games
Gold medal – first place	2020 Tokyo	100m freestyle S8
Gold medal – first place	2020 Tokyo	4×100 m freestyle 34 pts
Silver medal – second place	2020 Tokyo	4×100 m medley 34 pts
World Para Swimming Championships
Silver medal – second place	2019 London	100m freestyle S8
Bronze medal – third place	2019 London	50m freestyle S8
Bronze medal – third place	2019 London	4x100m freestyle 34 points

Ben Popham OAM (born 4 September 2000) is an Australian Paralympic swimmer. He represented Australia at the 2019 World Para Swimming Championships, winning a silver and two bronze medals, and the 2020 Summer Paralympics in Tokyo, where he won two gold medals and a silver. He was also a member of the West Australian team that won the 2025 National Para Soccer Championships.

== Personal ==
Popham was born on 4 September 2000. He was diagnosed with cerebral palsy as an infant. In 2011 he was chosen to be one of the Channel Seven Perth Telethon's "Little Telethon Stars". In 2019, he commenced a Bachelor of Commerce at Curtin University.

== Swimming career ==
Popham commenced swimming as a seven year old as part of his physical therapy program for cerebral palsy. Popham made his international debut when he represented Australia at the 2018 Pan Pacific Para Swimming Championships in Cairns and won the Men's 100m Freestyle S8 and was a member of the Men's 4x100m Freestyle Relay (34 points) team.

At the 2019 World Para Swimming Championships in London, Popham won a silver medal in the Men's 100m Freestyle S8 and bronze medals in the Men's 50m Freestyle S8 and Men's 4 x 100m Freestyle 34 points.

At the 2020 Tokyo Paralympics, Popham won a gold medal in the Men's 100m freestyle S8 with a time of 57.37 Together with Rowan Crothers, Matt Levy and William Martin, he won gold and broke the current World Record for the Men's 4×100 m freestyle 34 pts by almost 2 seconds. In the Men's 4x100m Medley 34 pts, he swam together with Timothy Disken, Timothy Hodge, and William Martin. His team won the silver medal in a time of 4:07.70, just over a second behind the winners, RPC, who set a new world record. He also competed in the 400 m freestyle S8 where he qualified for the final. He came eighth in the final with a time of 4:49.32.

He has since been reclassified to an S9 swimmer, a class for athletes with more physical ability compared to the S8 classification.

== Recognition ==
- 2018 – 'AIS Discovery of the Year' at Swimming Australia Awards.
- 2019 – Curtin University Sportsman of the Year
- 2019 – Western Australian Swimming Multi-Class Swimmer of the Year
- 2021 –Western Australian Swimming Awards - Sir Frank Beaurepaire Memorial Trophy, Elizabeth Edmondson Medallist and Hancock Prospecting Patron's Trophy for Male Swimming
- 2021 - Swimming Australia Awards Swimmers' Swimmer with Grant Patterson
- 2022 – Medal of the Order of Australia for service to sport as a gold medallist at the Tokyo Paralympic Games 2020
- 2026 – Swimming WA Hall of Fame
