= William Martin (swimmer) =

Australian Paralympic swimmer

Personal information
- Nationality: Australian
- Born: 22 November 2000 (age 25) Rockhampton, Queensland
- Education: St. Joseph's Nudgee College

Sport
- Country: Australia
- Sport: Paralympic swimming
- Disability class: S10
- Club: Nudgee College Swimming
- Coached by: Shaun Crow
Medal record
Paralympic swimming
Representing Australia
Paralympic Games
Gold medal – first place	2020 Tokyo	400 m freestyle S9
Gold medal – first place	2020 Tokyo	4×100 m freestyle 34 pts
Gold medal – first place	2020 Tokyo	100 m butterfly S9
Silver medal – second place	2020 Tokyo	4×100 m medley 34 pts
World Championships
Silver medal – second place	2022 Madeira	100 m butterfly S9
Bronze medal – third place	2022 Madeira	100 m freestyle S9

William Michael Martin, OAM (born 22 November 2000) is an Australian Paralympic swimmer. He won three gold and one silver medals at the 2020 Summer Paralympics in Tokyo, breaking two world records and a Paralympic record in the process.

== Personal ==
Martin was born on 22 November 2000. Martin's impairment is the result of a stroke he suffered in 2007. He has a vision impairment, and his hand also shakes due to a tremor. He was a learn-to-swim teacher at Nudgee College Swimming in Brisbane. As of 2024, he is undertaking an Electrical Engineering Degree at the University of Southern Queensland.

== Swimming career ==
Martin took up swimming after his stroke to help improve his movement. He is classified as an S9 swimmer. At the 2019 World Para Swimming Championships in London, he finished fifth in the Men's 100m butterfly (S10) and ninth in both the Men's 50m freestyle (S10) and Men's 100m freestyle (S10).

Martin broke his own world record with a time of 57.73 in the Men's 100m butterfly (S9) at the 2021 Australian Swimming Trials.

At the 2020 Summer Paralympics in Tokyo, Martin won the gold medal in the Men's 400 m freestyle S9 with a time of 4:10.25, a Paralympic record. He also won gold and set a new world record of 57.19 in the Men's 100 m butterfly S9. Martin won gold in the Men's 4×100 m freestyle 34 pts, along with Rowan Crothers, Matt Levy and Ben Popham, breaking the current World Record by almost 2 seconds. In the Men's 4x100m Medley 34 pts, he swam together with Timothy Disken, Timothy Hodge, and Ben Popham. His team won the silver medal in a time of 4:07.70, just over a second behind the winners, RPC, who set a new world record.

At the 2022 World Para Swimming Championships, Madeira, Martin won two medals - silver in the Men's 100 m Butterfly S9 and bronze in the Men's 100 m Freestyle S9 He did not win a medal in two other events.

At the 2022 Commonwealth Games in Birmingham, England, he finished 4th in the Men's 100 m butterfly S10.

== Recognition ==
- 2020 - Paralympics Australia Rookie of the Year
- 2021 - Swimming Australia Paralympic Program Swimmer of the Year
- 2022 – Medal of the Order of Australia for service to sport as a gold medallist at the 2020 Tokyo Paralympic Games
