= Antonio Fantin =

Italian Paralympic swimmer

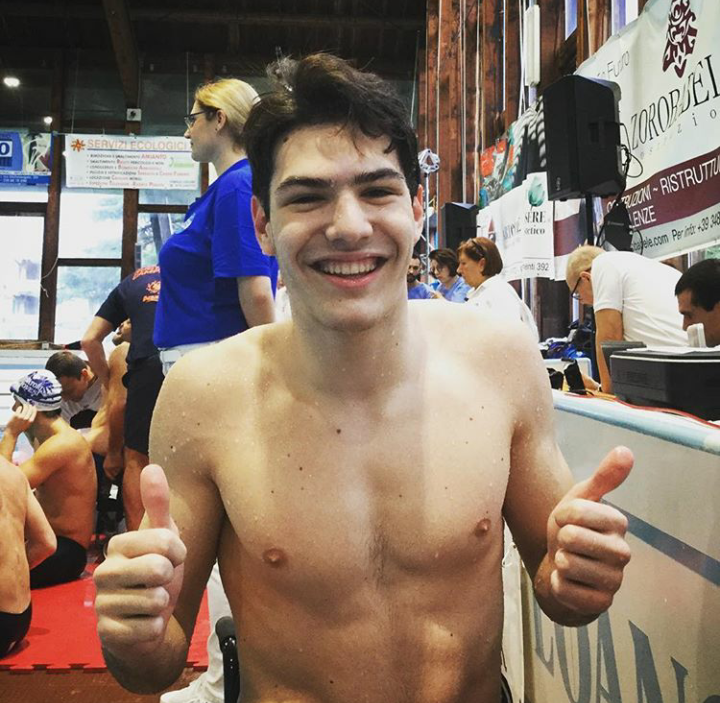

Personal information
- Nationality: Italy
- Born: 3 August 2001 (age 25) Latisana, Italy
- Height: 1.75 m (5 ft 9 in)
- Weight: 61 kg (134 lb)

Sport
- Sport: Swimming
- Strokes: freestyle, backstroke
- Club: Fiamme Oro Nuoto, Aspea Padova, SS Lazio Nuoto
- Coach: Matteo Poli, Federica Fornasiero
Medal record
Men's para swimming
Representing Italy
Event	1st	2nd	3rd
Paralympic Games	2	4	1
World Championships	7	3	4
European Championships	11	2	1
Total	20	9	6
Paralympic Games
Gold medal – first place	2020 Tokyo	100 m freestyle S6
Gold medal – first place	2024 Paris	100 m freestyle S6
Silver medal – second place	2020 Tokyo	Mixed 4 × 50 m freestyle relay 20pts
Silver medal – second place	2020 Tokyo	400 m freestyle S6
Silver medal – second place	2020 Tokyo	4×100 m freestyle 34 pts
Silver medal – second place	2024 Paris	400 m freestyle S6
Bronze medal – third place	2020 Tokyo	4x100 m medley relay 34pts
World Championships
Gold medal – first place	2017 Mexico City	400 m freestyle SM6
Gold medal – first place	2022 Madeira	400 m freestyle S6
Gold medal – first place	2022 Madeira	50 m freestyle S6
Gold medal – first place	2023 Manchester	50 m freestyle S6
Gold medal – first place	2023 Manchester	100 m freestyle S6
Gold medal – first place	2025 Singapore	100 m freestyle S6
Gold medal – first place	2025 Singapore	400 m freestyle S6
Gold medal – first place	2025 Singapore	50 m freestyle S6
Silver medal – second place	2017 Mexico City	4 x 50 freestyle relay 20pts
Silver medal – second place	2017 Mexico City	4 x 100 freestyle relay 34pts
Silver medal – second place	2023 Manchester	400 m freestyle S6
Bronze medal – third place	2017 Mexico City	100 m freestyle SM6
Bronze medal – third place	2017 Mexico City	100 m backstroke SM6
Bronze medal – third place	2022 Madeira	100 m backstroke S6
Bronze medal – third place	2025 Singapore	100 m backstroke S6
European Championships
Gold medal – first place	2018 Dublin	50 m freestyle S5
Gold medal – first place	2018 Dublin	100 m freestyle S5
Gold medal – first place	2018 Dublin	4 x 50 freestyle relay 20pts
Gold medal – first place	2018 Dublin	4 x 100 freestyle relay 34pts
Gold medal – first place	2020 Madeira	50 m freestyle S6
Gold medal – first place	2020 Madeira	100 m freestyle S6
Gold medal – first place	2020 Madeira	400 m freestyle S6
Gold medal – first place	2024 Madeira	100 m freestyle S6
Gold medal – first place	2024 Madeira	400 m Freestyle S6
Gold medal – first place	2026 Kocaeli	100 m freestyle S6
Gold medal – first place	2026 Kocaeli	400 m freestyle S6
Silver medal – second place	2018 Dublin	200 m freestyle S5
Silver medal – second place	2018 Dublin	50 m backstroke S5
Bronze medal – third place	2020 Madeira	100 m Backstroke S6

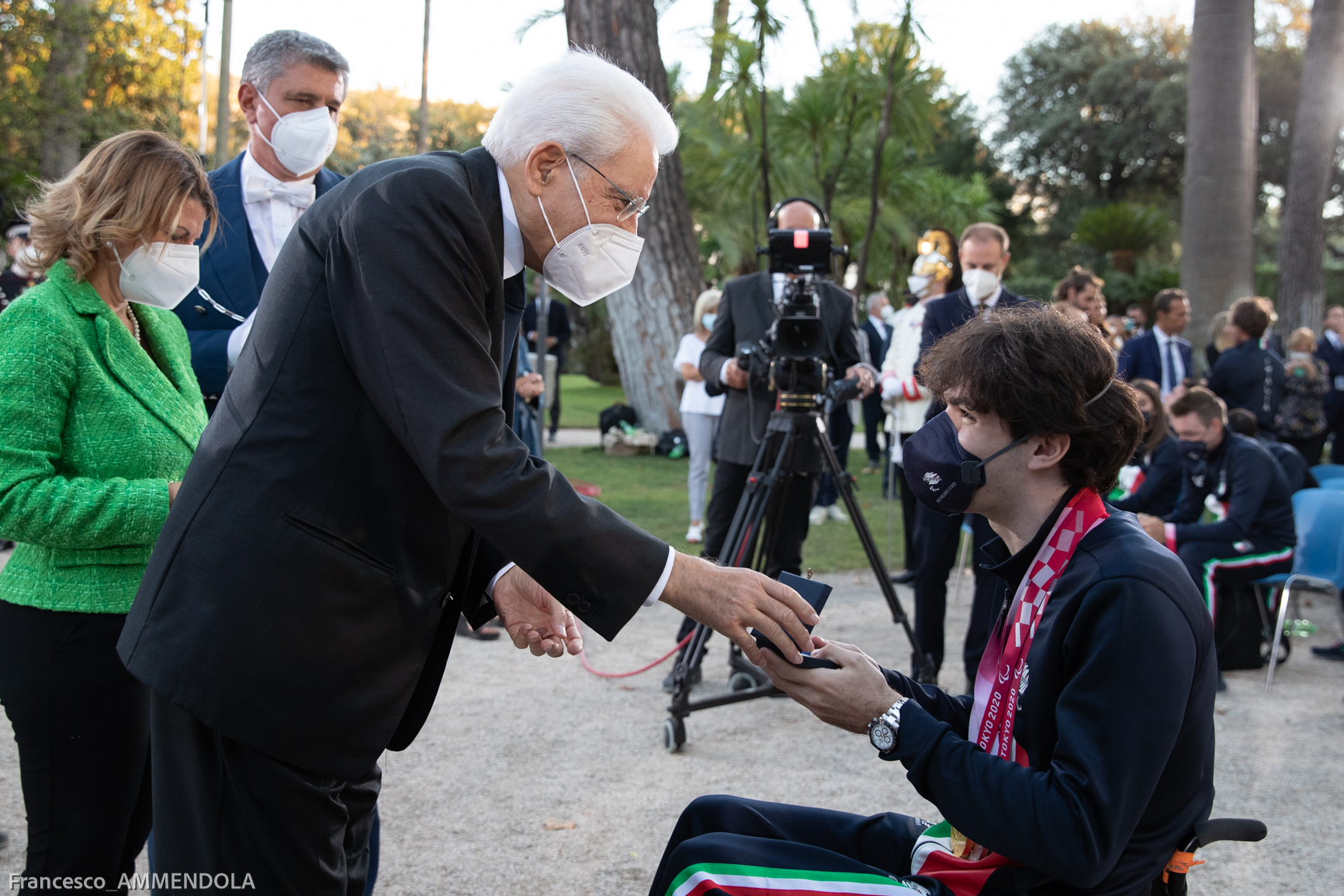
Fantin awarded by Sergio Mattarella at Quirinale in 2021.

Antonio Fantin (born 3 August 2001) is an Italian swimmer who competes in Paralympic S5 and SM5 (individual medley) events. He won the International Sports Prize World Athlete of the Year award in 2022.

Fantin is an athlete of the Gruppo Sportivo Fiamme Oro.

== Career history ==
Fantin began swimming at age four in Lignano Sabbiadoro, Italy. He came to international attention when he competed at the 2017 World Para Swimming Championships, at the age of 16, winning the 400 metres freestyle S6 category.

The following year Fantin was reclassified as S5, and represented Italy again at the 2018 World Para Swimming European Championships in Dublin, Ireland. Fantin won 4 gold medals, and six medals in all, to make the top 5 individual performances of the meet.

== See also ==
- Italy at the 2020 Summer Paralympics
