= Kota Kubota =

Japanese paralympic swimmer

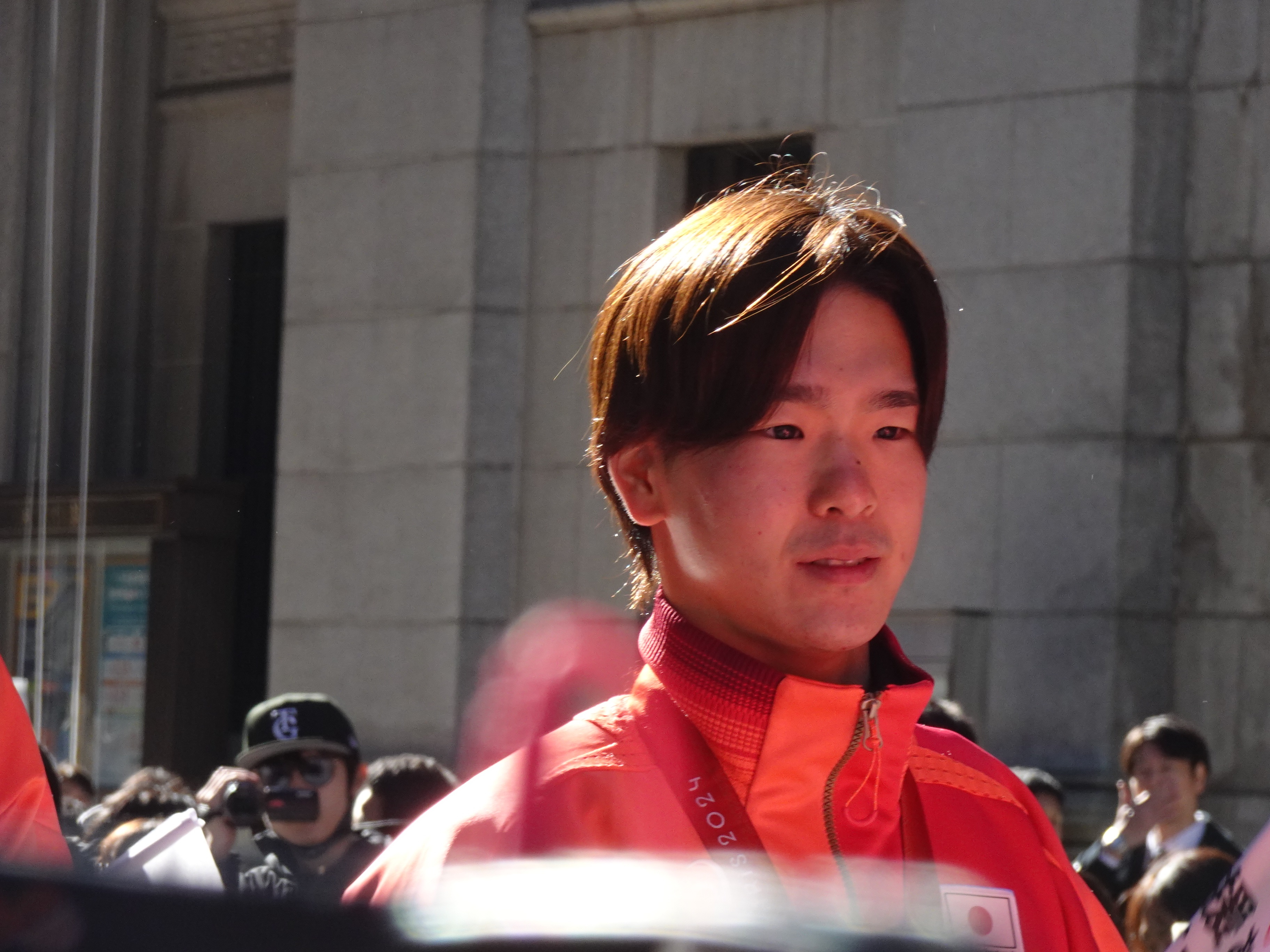
- Kota Kubota at Paris 2024 Summer Olympians and Paralympians Japan National Team parade event on November 30th, 2024

Personal information
- Native name: 窪田幸太
- Born: March 6, 2000 Chiba, Chiba, Japan

Sport
- Country: Japan
- Sport: Para swimming
Medal record
Para swimming
Representing Japan
Paralympic Games
Silver medal – second place	2024 Paris	100 m backstroke S8
World Championships
Silver medal – second place	2023 Manchester	100 m backstroke S8
Asian Para Games
Gold medal – first place	2018 Jakarta	4 × 100 m freestyle relay
Gold medal – first place	2022 Hangzhou	100 m backstroke S8
Silver medal – second place	2018 Jakarta	100 m backstroke S8
Silver medal – second place	2018 Jakarta	4 × 100 m medley relay
Silver medal – second place	2022 Hangzhou	4 × 100 m freestyle relay
Silver medal – second place	2022 Hangzhou	4 × 100 m medley relay
Bronze medal – third place	2018 Jakarta	50 m freestyle S8

Kota Kubota (窪田 幸太, Kubota Kota; born 6 March 2000) is a Japanese paralympic swimmer. He competed at the 2024 Summer Paralympics, winning the silver medal in the men's 100 m backstroke S8 event.
