= Andrei Nikolaev (swimmer) =

Russian Paralympic swimmer (born 2000)

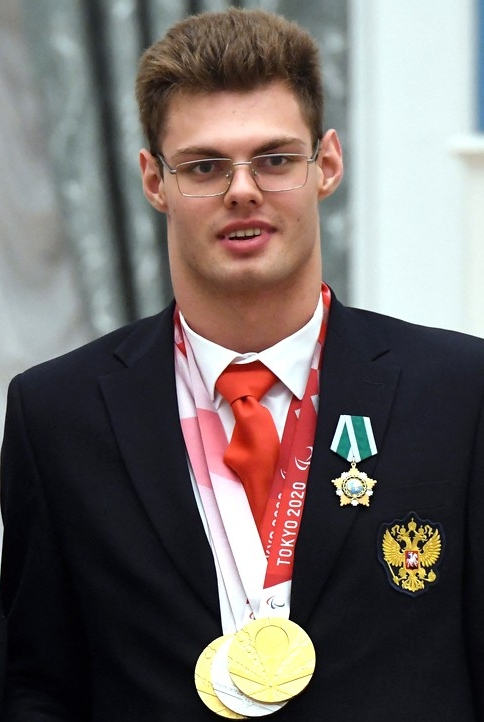
- Nikolaev in 2021

Personal information
- Nationality: Russian
- Born: 6 September 2000 (age 26) Salavat, Russia
- Education: Ufa State Petroleum Technical University

Sport
- Sport: Paralympic swimming
- Disability class: S8
- Club: Bashkortostan Republican Adaptive Sports School of Paralympic Reserve
- Coached by: Fanil Kiraev
Medal record
Representing RPC
Paralympic Games
Gold medal – first place	2020 Tokyo	400 m freestyle S8
Gold medal – first place	2020 Tokyo	4×100 m medley relay 34pts
Silver medal – second place	2020 Tokyo	100 m freestyle S8
Representing Russia
World Championships
Gold medal – first place	2019 London	4x100 m medley relay 34pts
Gold medal – first place	2019 London	400 m freestyle S8
Bronze medal – third place	2019 London	100 m freestyle S8
European Championships
Gold medal – first place	2020 Funchal	400 m freestyle S8
Gold medal – first place	2020 Funchal	4x100 m medley relay 34pts
Gold medal – first place	2026 Kocaeli	400 m freestyle S8
Silver medal – second place	2020 Funchal	50 m freestyle S8
Silver medal – second place	2020 Funchal	100 m freestyle S8
Representing Neutral Paralympic Athletes
Paralympic Games
Bronze medal – third place	2024 Paris	400 m freestyle S8
World Championships
Silver medal – second place	2025 Singapore	400 m freestyle S8
European Championships
Silver medal – second place	2024 Funchal	400 m freestyle S8
Bronze medal – third place	2024 Funchal	100 m freestyle S8
Bronze medal – third place	2026 Kocaeli	100 m freestyle S8

Andrei Aleksandrovich Nikolaev (Russian: Андрей Александрович Николаев; born 6 September 2000), is a Russian Paralympic swimmer who specializes in the 50–400 m S8 freestyle events.

== Career ==
Nikolaev represented Russia at the 2019 World Para Swimming Championships and won two gold medals and one bronze medal.

He represented Russian Paralympic Committee athletes at the 2020 Summer Paralympics and won two gold medals and one silver medal.
