= Federico Morlacchi =

Italian Paralympic swimmer (born 1993)

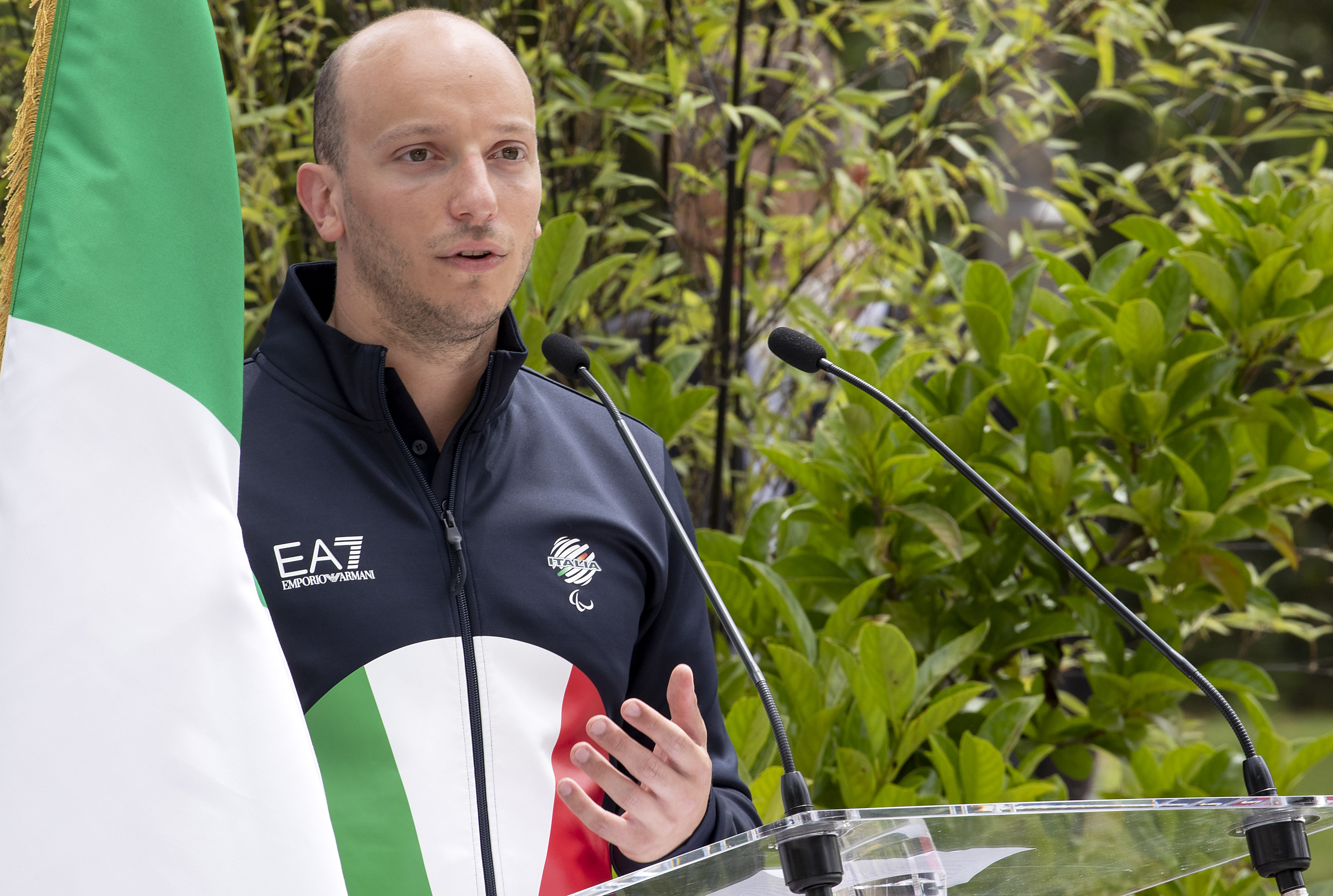

Personal information
- Nickname: Morlacci (Note: Due to foreign speakers who do not always pronounce his last name correctly.)
- Nationality: Italian
- Born: 11 November 1993 (age 32) Luino, Italy

Sport
- Sport: Paralympic swimming
- Disability: Unilateral below the elbow upper limb amputations
- Disability class: S9, SB8, SM9
- Club: Polha Varese
- Coached by: Massimiliano Tosin
Medal record
Men's para swimming
Representing Italy
Event	1st	2nd	3rd
Paralympic Games	1	3	4
World Championships	6	9	3
European Championships	13	2	5
Total	20	14	12

Federico Morlacchi (born 11 November 1993) is an Italian paralympic swimmer who was flagbearer for Italy at the 2020 Summer Paralympics open ceremony ensemble with Bebe Vio. He won the International Sports Prize World Athlete of the Year award in 2015.

== Biography ==
He is boyfriend of the Italian paralympic swimmer Giulia Ghiretti. He won 18 medals at the World Para Swimming Championships and 20 at the IPC Swimming European Championships.

== Achievements ==
Year	Competition	Venue	Position	Event	Notes
2012	Paralympics Games	(United Kingdom) London	3rd	100 m butterfly S9	
2012	Paralympics Games	(United Kingdom) London	3rd	400 m freestyle S9	
2012	Paralympics Games	(United Kingdom) London	3rd	200 m individual medley SM9	
2016	Paralympics Games	(Brazil) Rio de Janeiro	1st	200 m individual medley SM9	
2016	Paralympics Games	(Brazil) Rio de Janeiro	2nd	400 m freestyle S9	
2016	Paralympics Games	(Brazil) Rio de Janeiro	2nd	100 m butterfly S9	
2016	Paralympics Games	(Brazil) Rio de Janeiro	2nd	100 m breaststroke SB8	
2021	Paralympics Games	(Japan) Tokyo	3rd	4 × 100 m Medley Relay 34 pts	(Note: He swam in heats.) (Note: Swimmers who participated in the heats only and received medals.)

== See also ==
- Italy at the 2012 Summer Paralympics
- Italy at the 2016 Summer Paralympics
- Italy at the 2020 Summer Paralympics
