= Liu Fengqi =

Chinese Paralympic swimmer

Personal information
- Born: 27 February 1999 (age 27)

Sport
- Sport: Swimming
Medal record
Paralympic Games
Bronze medal – third place	2020 Tokyo	100 m backstroke S8
Asian Para Games
Silver medal – second place	2022 Hangzhou	100 m backstroke S8
Bronze medal – third place	2022 Hangzhou	200 m ind. medley SM8

Liu Fengqi (born 27 February 1999) is a Chinese Paralympic swimmer. He won the bronze medal in the men's 100 metre backstroke S8 event at the 2020 Summer Paralympics in Tokyo, Japan.
