= Mark Malyar =

Israeli Paralympic swimmer (born 2000)

Mark Malyar מארק מליאר
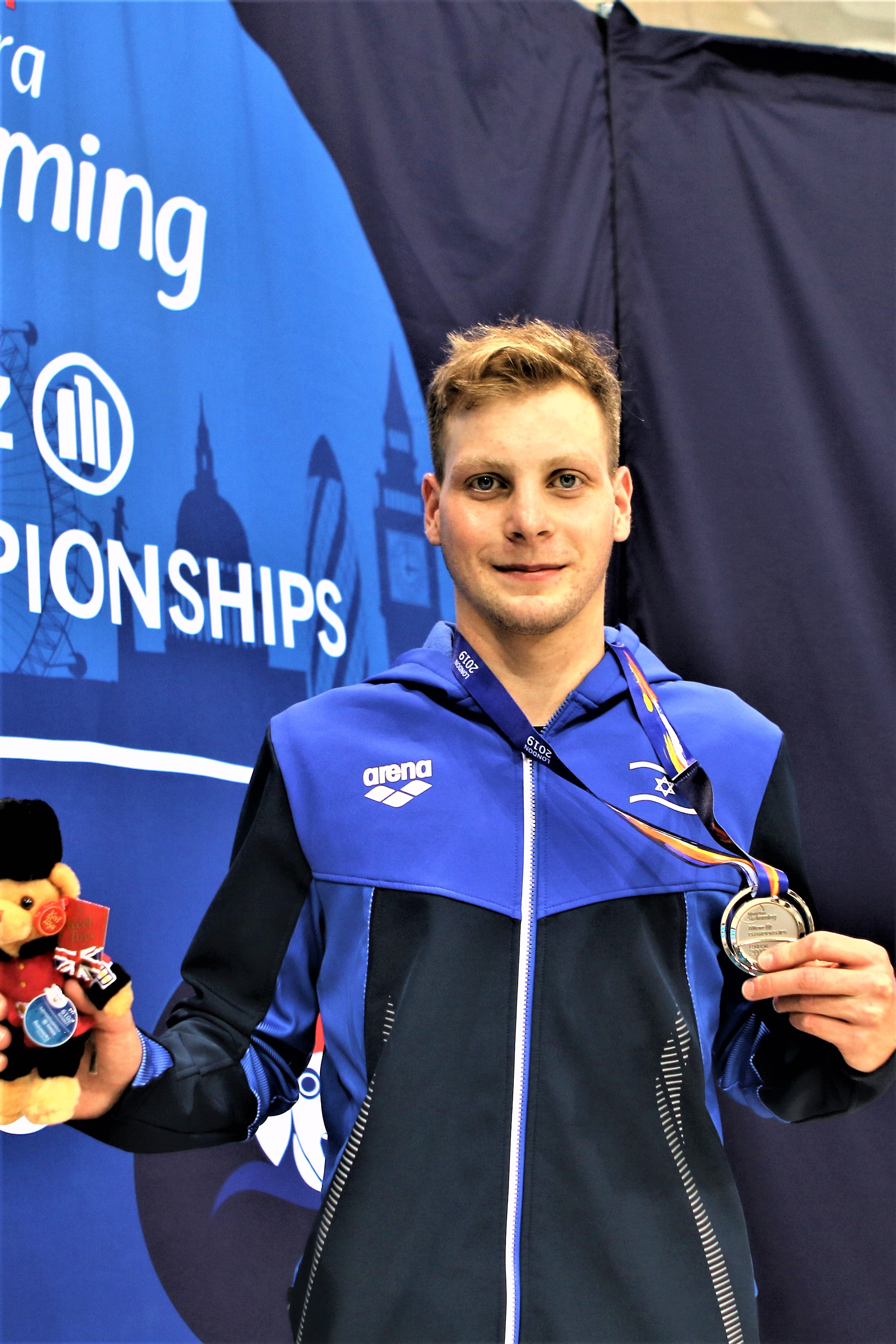

Personal information
- Nationality: Israeli
- Born: 5 March 2000 (age 26) Haifa, Israel
- Home town: Kiryat Motzkin, Israel

Sport
- Country: Israel
- Sport: Para swimming
- Disability: Cerebral Palsy
- Disability class: S7, SB6, SM7
- Club: Ilan Sport Center
- Coached by: Jacob Beninson
Medal record
Event	1st	2nd	3rd
Paralympic Games	2	0	2
World Championships	1	1	4
European Championships	1	3	3
Total	4	4	9
Representing Israel
Men's para swimming
Paralympic Games
Gold medal – first place	2020 Tokyo	200m medley SM7
Gold medal – first place	2020 Tokyo	400m freestyle S7
Bronze medal – third place	2020 Tokyo	100m backstroke S7
Bronze medal – third place	2024 Paris	100 m backstroke S8
World Championships
Gold medal – first place	2019 London	400m freestyle S7
Silver medal – second place	2019 London	200m medley S7
Bronze medal – third place	2017 Mexico City	100m backstroke S8
Bronze medal – third place	2017 Mexico City	100m breaststroke SB7
Bronze medal – third place	2022 Madeira	100m breaststroke SB7
Bronze medal – third place	2023 Manchester	200m medley SM8
European Championships
Gold medal – first place	2020 Funchal	100m backstroke S7
Silver medal – second place	2018 Dublin	400m freestyle S7
Silver medal – second place	2020 Funchal	200m medley SM7
Silver medal – second place	2020 Funchal	100m breaststroke SB6
Bronze medal – third place	2018 Dublin	100m backstroke S7
Bronze medal – third place	2018 Dublin	100m breaststroke SB6
Bronze medal – third place	2020 Funchal	400m freestyle S7

Mark Malyar (Hebrew: מארק מליאר; born 5 March 2000) is an Israeli Paralympic champion and world champion para swimmer. As of 2024, he had won four world championships and set four world records. At the 2020 Tokyo Paralympics, he won two gold medals while setting two world records. He competed for Israel at the 2024 Paris Paralympics, and won a bronze medal in the Men's 100 metre backstroke S8.

== Early life ==
Malyar was born with cerebral palsy at Bnei Zion Medical Center in Haifa, Israel. His parents are Alex and Diana, and he has an identical twin brother, Ariel Malyar, who is also a Paralympic swimmer and also competed in the Tokyo Paralympics and is competing in the Paris Paralympics. He grew up in Kiryat Motzkin, Israel.

== Swimming career ==
Malyar began swimming at age 5 with his brother as part of hydrotherapy treatment. Later, he joined the ILAN Haifa swimming team. He trains at the ILAN pool in Kiryat Haim, and is coached by Yaakov Benenson. He was named the 2017 Athlete of the Year by the Israeli Paralympic Committee.

At the 2017 World Championships in Mexico, at 17 years of age, he won a bronze medal in the 100-meter backstroke. At the 2018 European Championships in Dublin he won the silver medal in the 400-meter freestyle, and bronze medals in both the 100-meter breaststroke and the 100-meter backstroke. At the 2019 World Championships in London, he won the gold medal in the 400-meter freestyle (setting a new world record of 4:33.64), and the silver medal in the 200-meter individual medley.

Malyar represented Israel at the 2020 Tokyo Paralympics at 21 years of age, and won gold medals in the 200 metre individual medley SM7 (in 2:29.01) and the 400 m freestyle S7 (in 4:31.06), setting new world records in both, and the bronze medal in the 100 m backstroke S7. He said: "I’m happy that I succeeded..., I’m very tired. I didn’t feel that I was even going that fast, but it worked and my body is just about done."

=== 2024–present; Paris Paralympics ===
As of August 2024, he held world records in the 400-meter, 800-meter, and 1,500-meter freestyle and 200-meter individual medley, and had won four world championship medals.

He competed for Israel at the 2024 Paris Paralympics. Malyar won a bronze medal in the Men's 100 metre backstroke S8. He dedicated his medal to the Israel Defense Forces soldiers fighting to protect Israel, and said: "I want to thank the soldiers and everyone who protects us, thanks to them we can train and we can get to this point, we’re able to live thanks to them."

== See also ==
- List of 2024 Summer Paralympics medal winners
- List of IPC world records in swimming – Men's long course
- List of Paralympic records in swimming
