= Matthew Torres =

American Paralympic swimmer (born 2001)

Personal information
- Born: March 27, 2001 (age 25) Norwalk, Connecticut, U.S.

Sport
- Sport: Paralympic swimming
- Disability class: S8, SB8, SM8
Medal record
Men's paralympic swimming
Representing United States
Paralympic Games
Bronze medal – third place	2020 Tokyo	400 m freestyle S8
Bronze medal – third place	2024 Paris	Mixed 4×100 m freestyle relay 34pts
World Championships
Silver medal – second place	2022 Madeira	400 m freestyle S8
Parapan American Games
Gold medal – first place	2019 Lima	100 m backstroke S8
Gold medal – first place	2019 Lima	400 m freestyle S9
Bronze medal – third place	2019 Lima	100 m freestyle S8
Bronze medal – third place	2019 Lima	200 m ind. medley SM8
Bronze medal – third place	2019 Lima	4x100 m freestyle relay 34pts
Bronze medal – third place	2019 Lima	4x100 m medley relay 34pts

Matthew Torres (born March 27, 2001) is an American Paralympic swimmer who represented the United States at the 2020 Summer Paralympics.

== Career ==
He represented the United States in the men's 400 metre freestyle S8 event at the 2020 Summer Paralympics and won a bronze medal.

On April 14, 2022, Torres was named to the roster to represent the United States at the 2022 World Para Swimming Championships. On April 29, 2023, Torres was named to the roster to represent the United States at the 2023 World Para Swimming Championships.
