= Federico Bicelli =

Italian Paralympic swimmer (born 1999)

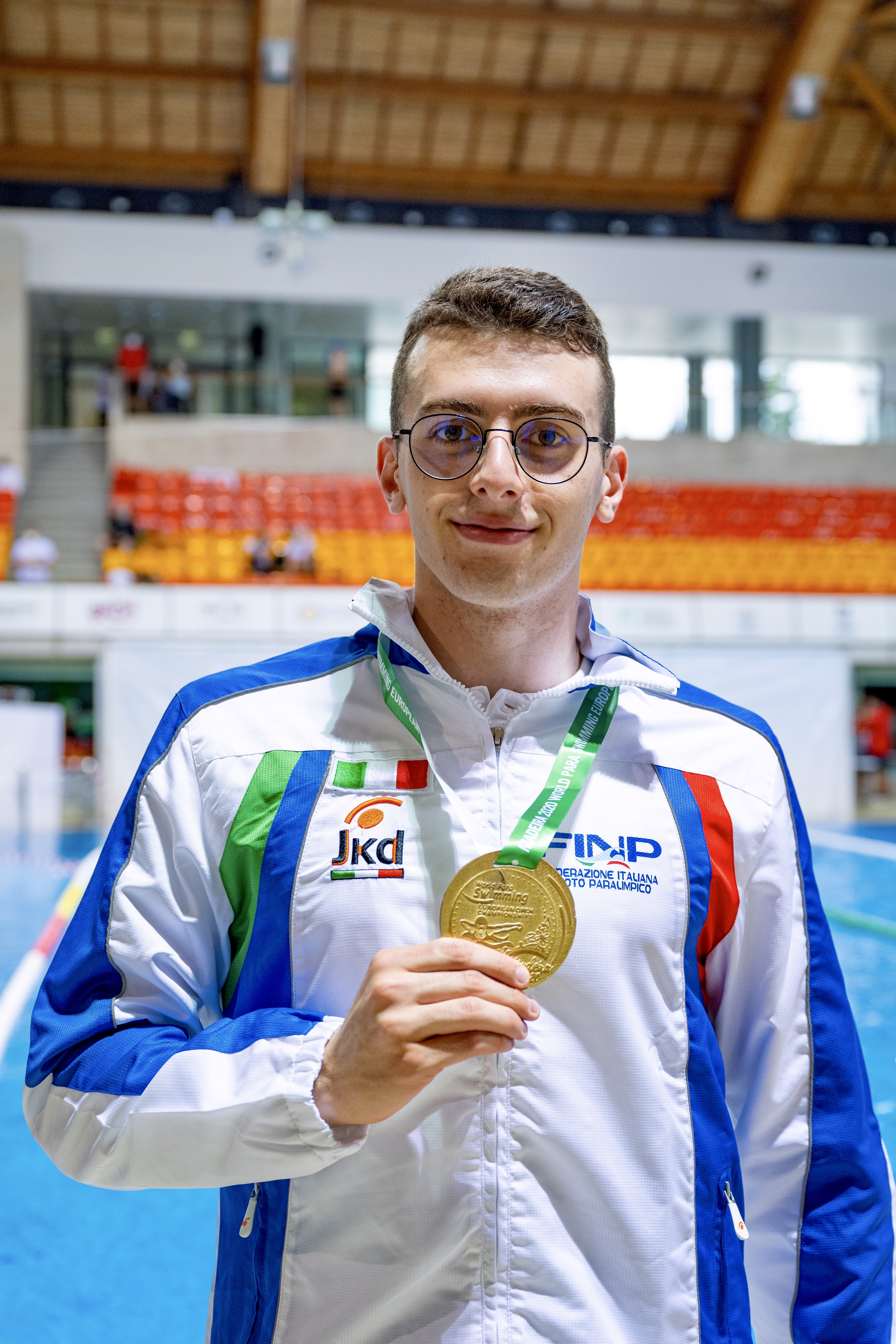
- Bicelli in 2021

Personal information
- National team: Italy
- Born: 5 February 1999 (age 27) Brescia, Italy
- Height: 1.71 m (5 ft 7 in)
- Weight: 65 kg (143 lb)

Sport
- Sport: Paralympic swimming
- Disability class: S7, S8
- Club: Polisportiva Bresciana No Frontiere
Medal record
Paralympic swimming
Representing Italy
Event	1st	2nd	3rd
Paralympics	1	0	2
World Championships	2	4	2
European Championships	5	4	1
Paralympic Games
Gold medal – first place	2024 Paris	400 m freestyle S7
Bronze medal – third place	2020 Tokyo	4x100m Medley Relay 34 pts
Bronze medal – third place	2024 Paris	100 m backstroke S7
World Championships
Gold medal – first place	2023 Manchester	400 m freestyle S7
Gold medal – first place	2025 Singapore	400 m freestyle S7
Silver medal – second place	2022 Madeira	100 m backstroke S7
Silver medal – second place	2022 Madeira	100 m freestyle S7
Silver medal – second place	2023 Manchester	100 m freestyle S7
Silver medal – second place	2025 Singapore	100 m backstroke S7
Silver medal – second place	2025 Singapore	100 m freestyle S7
Bronze medal – third place	2022 Madeira	50 m freestyle S7
Bronze medal – third place	2023 Manchester	100 m backstroke S7

Federico Bicelli (born 5 February 1999) is an Italian Paralympic swimmer who won a medal at 2020 Summer Paralympics.

He won a silver medal at the World Para Swimming Championships and 10 medals at the IPC Swimming European Championships.

== Career ==
Born in Brescia, Federico has spina bifida, which is why he approached swimming from an early age. Federico graduated in 2017 from the Abba Ballini commercial technical institute, now he attends the second year at the Catholic university with a computer address. Competitive swimming began in 2009 with the Polisportiva Bresciana No Frontiere sector Paralympic swimming. Specialized in 50m, 100m and 400m freestyle.

In 2017 he participated in the European youth championships in Genoa, winning a gold medal in the 100 backstrokes, a silver medal in the 400 freestyle and a bronze medal in the 100 freestyle.

In 2018 he participated in the European Championship in Dublin winning a gold medal in the 100 freestyle, a silver medal in the 100 backstroke, a bronze medal in the 50 freestyle and finally a gold medal in the relay 4X100 mixed.

In 2019 he won a gold medal in the 100 freestyle at the Settecolli Trophy in Rome and participated in the London World Championship winning a silver medal in the mixed 4x100 relay, freestyle fraction.
