= Iñigo Llopis Sanz =

Spanish Paralympic swimmer

Iñigo Llopis
Personal information
- Full name: Iñigo Llopis Sanz
- Nationality: Spanish
- Born: 13 November 1998 (age 27) San Sebastián, Spain

Sport
- Sport: Paralympic swimming
- Disability class: S8
- Club: Konporta KE
- Coached by: Isaac Pousada
Medal record
Men's para swimming
Representing Spain
Paralympic Games
Gold medal – first place	2024 Paris	100 m backstroke S8
Silver medal – second place	2020 Tokyo	100 m backstroke S8
Bronze medal – third place	2024 Paris	Mixed 4×100 m medley relay 34pts
World Championships
Gold medal – first place	2025 Singapore	100 m backstroke S8
Gold medal – first place	2025 Singapore	Mixed 4×100 m medley relay 34pts
Silver medal – second place	2022 Madeira	100 m backstroke S8
Bronze medal – third place	2019 London	100 m backstroke S8
European Championships
Gold medal – first place	2020 Funchal	100 m backstroke S8
Gold medal – first place	2018 Dublin	400 m freestyle S8
Silver medal – second place	2018 Dublin	100 m freestyle S8
Silver medal – second place	2018 Dublin	100 m backstroke S8
Silver medal – second place	2018 Dublin	4 x 100 medley 34 pts
Silver medal – second place	2026 Kocaeli	100 m backstroke S8
Bronze medal – third place	2018 Dublin	4 x 100 freestyle 34 pts
Bronze medal – third place	2020 Funchal	400 m freestyle S8

Iñigo Llopis Sanz (born 13 November 1998) is a Spanish para swimmer who has represented Spain at the 2020 and 2024 Summer Paralympics.

== Career ==
Llopis competed in the men's 100 metre backstroke S8 event at the 2020 Summer Paralympics and won a silver medal. At the 2024 Summer Paralympics, he won the gold medal in the same category and the bronze medal in the Mixed 4×100 m medley relay - 34pts category.

== Personal life ==
Llopis's father, Luis, is goalkeeping coach for Real Madrid CF.
