= List of Paralympic records in swimming =

The International Paralympic Committee recognises the fastest performances in swimming events at the Paralympic Games. Swimming has been part of at every Summer Paralympic Games.

Races are held in four swimming strokes: freestyle, backstroke, breaststroke and butterfly over varying distances and in either individual or relay race events. Medley events combine all four strokes, again either as an individual format (swum in order: butterfly, backstroke, breaststroke, freestyle) and as a team relay (swim in order: backstroke, breaststroke, butterfly, freestyle). Competitors are allocated a classification based on their ability in the water, with records available for each event in each classification.

- 1-10: Physical disability: Classes S1, SB1, SM1 for athletes who are least physically able; S10, SB9, SM10 for those with greatest ability in the water
- 11-13: Visual impairment: Class S11 for totally blind athletes, to class S13 for athletes who have some vision, but are considered legally blind
- 14: Intellectual disability

Not all events are offered at each Paralympic Games. The decision is made by the IPC based on factors including there being a minimum of 6 athletes from a minimum of 4 National Paralympic Committees to make a race viable. In addition, an event must have been also held at the previous Games, or at the IPC Swimming World Championships held between the Games. In total there is an aim to provide a minimum of 7 individual events and 2 relays events for all classes, with an overall total of 140 events being contested at each Games. The currently used classification system has been in use since the 2000 Sydney Games.

== Men's records ==
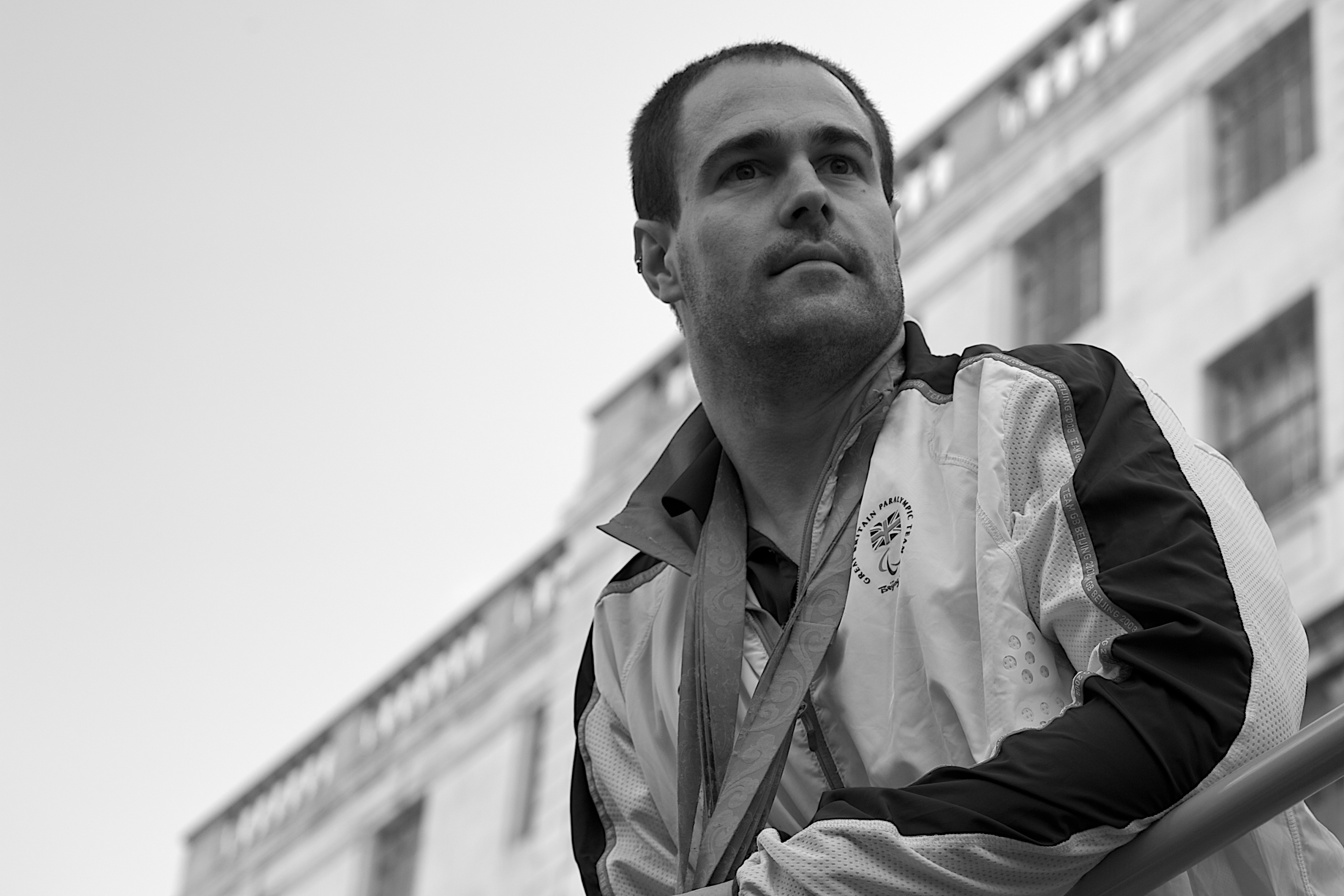
David Roberts (GBR)

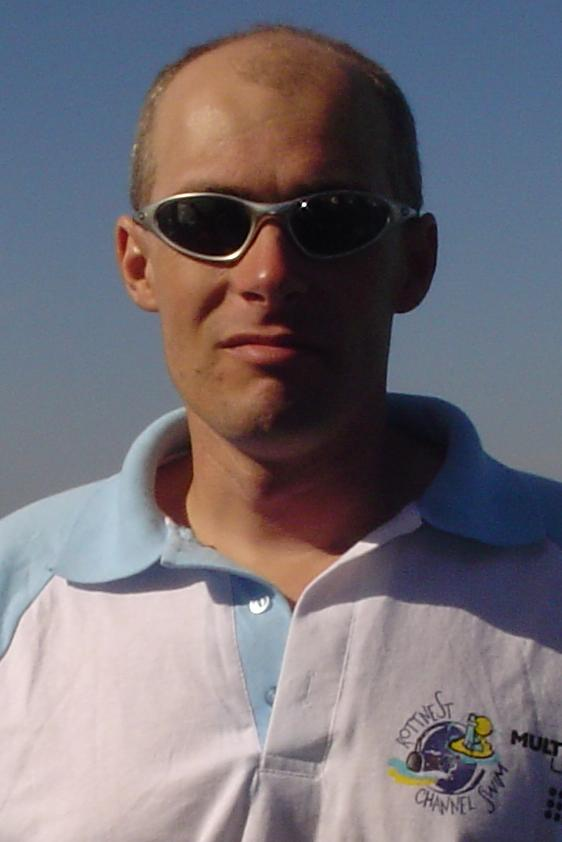
Kingsley Bugarin (AUS)

=== 50 m freestyle ===
Event	Class	Time		Name	Nation	Date	Games	Location	Ref
50 m freestyle	S1	1:03.93	†	Izhak Mamistvalov	Israel	3 September 2012	2012 Games	London, United Kingdom	
50 m freestyle	S2	50.65	†, WR	Zou Liankang	China	11 September 2016	2016 Games	Rio de Janeiro, Brazil	
50 m freestyle	S3	39.24		Huang Wenpan	China	13 September 2016	2016 Games	Rio de Janeiro, Brazil	
50 m freestyle	S4	35.61	WR	Sebastian Massabie	Canada	6 September 2024	2024 Games	Paris, France	
50 m freestyle	S5	29.33	WR	Guo Jincheng	China	5 September 2024	2024 Games	Paris, France	
50 m freestyle	S6	28.57	WR	Xu Qing	China	4 September 2012	2012 Games	London, United Kingdom	
50 m freestyle	S7	26.38	WR	Andrii Trusov	Ukraine	4 September 2024	2024 Games	Paris, France	
50 m freestyle	S8	25.82		Denis Tarasov	Russia	3 September 2012	2012 Games	London, United Kingdom	
50 m freestyle	S9	23.90	WR	Simone Barlaam	Italy	2 September 2024	2024 Games	Paris, France	
50 m freestyle	S10	23.16	WR	André Brasil	Brazil	31 August 2012	2012 Games	London, United Kingdom	
50 m freestyle	S11	25.27	WR	Yang Bozun	China	1 September 2012	2012 Games	London, United Kingdom	
50 m freestyle	S12	23.43		Maksym Veraska	Ukraine	14 September 2008	2008 Games	Beijing, China	
50 m freestyle	S13	23.21		Ihar Boki	Belarus	29 August 2021	2020 Games	Tokyo, Japan	

Legend: # – Record awaiting ratification by IPC; WR – World record; e – equalled existing record;
Records not set in finals: h – heat; r – relay 1st leg; rh – relay heat 1st leg; † – en route to final mark; so – swim-off

=== 100 m freestyle ===
Event	Class	Time		Name	Nation	Date	Games	Location	Ref
100 m freestyle	S1	2:15.83	†	Izhak Mamistvalov	Israel	1 September 2012	2012 Games	London, United Kingdom	
100 m freestyle	S2	1:46.63	†, WR	Liu Benying	China	11 September 2016	2016 Games	Rio de Janeiro, Brazil	
100 m freestyle	S3	1:34.32	†	Dmytro Vynohradets	Ukraine	15 September 2016	2016 Games	Rio de Janeiro, Brazil	
100 m freestyle	S4	1:19.33	h	Ami Omer Dadaon	Israel	30 August 2024	2024 Games	Paris, France	
100 m freestyle	S5	1:07.77		Oleksandr Komarov	Ukraine	30 August 2024	2024 Games	Paris, France	
100 m freestyle	S6	1:03.12		Antonio Fantin	Italy	5 September 2024	2024 Games	Paris, France	
100 m freestyle	S7	1:00.35		David Roberts	Great Britain	8 Sep 2008	2008 Games		
100 m freestyle	S8	56.58		Wang Yinan	China	6 September 2012	2012 Games		
100 m freestyle	S9	52.43		Simone Barlaam	Italy	1 September 2024	2024 Games	Paris, France	
100 m freestyle	S10	50.64	WR	Maksym Krypak	Ukraine	28 August 2021	2020 Games	Tokyo, Japan	
100 m freestyle	S11	56.15	WR	Bradley Snyder	United States	15 September 2016	2016 Games	Rio de Janeiro, Brazil	
100 m freestyle	S12	51.40		Maksym Veraksa	Ukraine	4 September 2012	2012 Games		
100 m freestyle	S13	50.90		Ihar Boki	Belarus	16 September 2016	2016 Games	Rio de Janeiro, Brazil	

Legend: # – Record awaiting ratification by IPC; WR – World record; e – equalled existing record;
Records not set in finals: h – heat; r – relay 1st leg; rh – relay heat 1st leg; † – en route to final mark; so – swim-off

=== 200 m freestyle ===
Event	Class	Time		Name	Nation	Date	Games	Location	Ref
200 m freestyle	S1	4:41.79		Kamil Otowski	Poland	2 September 2024	2024 Games	Paris, France	
200 m freestyle	S2	3:41.54	WR	Liu Benying	China	11 September 2016	2016 Games	Rio de Janeiro, Brazil	
200 m freestyle	S3	3:09.04	WR	Huang Wenpan	China	15 September 2016	2016 Games	Rio de Janeiro, Brazil	
200 m freestyle	S4	2:44.84	WR	Ami Omer Dadaon	Israel	30 August 2021	2020 Games	Tokyo, Japan	
200 m freestyle	S5	2:25.99		Francesco Bocciardo	Italy	29 August 2024	2024 Games	Paris, France	
200 m freestyle	S6	2:25.29	†	Darragh McDonald	Ireland	1 September 2012	2012 Games	London, United Kingdom	
200 m freestyle	S14	1:51.30	WR	William Ellard	Great Britain	31 August 2024	2024 Games	Paris, France	

Legend: # – Record awaiting ratification by IPC; WR – World record; e – equalled existing record;
Records not set in finals: h – heat; † – en route to final mark; so – swim-off

=== 400 m freestyle ===
Event	Class	Time		Name	Nation	Date	Games	Location	Ref
400 m freestyle	S6	4:48.31		Anders Olsson	Sweden	14 September 2008	2008 Games	Beijing, China	
400 m freestyle	S7	4:31.06	WR	Mark Malyar	Israel	29 August 2021	2020 Games	Tokyo, Japan	
400 m freestyle	S8	4:21.89		Oliver Hynd	Great Britain	8 September 2016	2016 Games	Rio de Janeiro, Brazil	
400 m freestyle	S9	4:10.25		William Martin	Australia	25 August 2021	2020 Games	Tokyo, Japan	
400 m freestyle	S10	3:57.71	WR	Maksym Krypak	Ukraine	15 September 2016	2016 Games	Rio de Janeiro, Brazil	
400 m freestyle	S11	4:20.83	WR	John Morgan	United States	7 September 1992	1992 Games	Barcelona, Spain	
400 m freestyle	S12	4:05.99		Kylian Portal	France	31 August 2024	2024 Games	Paris, France	
400 m freestyle	S13	3:55.62		Ihar Boki	Belarus	12 September 2016	2016 Games	Rio de Janeiro, Brazil	

Legend: # – Record awaiting ratification by IPC; WR – World record; e – equalled existing record;
Records not set in finals: h – heat; so – swim-off

=== 50 m backstroke ===
Event	Class	Time		Name	Nation	Date	Games	Location	Ref
50 m backstroke	S1	59.96	†, WR	Hennadii Boiko	Ukraine	9 September 2016	2016 Games	Rio de Janeiro, Brazil	
50 m backstroke	S2	47.17	WR	Zou Liankang	China	15 September 2016	2016 Games	Rio de Janeiro, Brazil	
50 m backstroke	S3	42.21	†, WR	Min Byeong-eon	South Korea	2 September 2012	2012 Games	London, United Kingdom	
50 m backstroke	S4	40.99	WR	Roman Zhdanov	RPC	3 September 2021	2020 Games	Tokyo, Japan	
50 m backstroke	S5	31.42	WR	Zheng Tao	China	30 August 2021	2020 Games	Tokyo, Japan	

Legend: # – Record awaiting ratification by IPC; WR – World record; e – equalled existing record;
Records not set in finals: h – heat; r – relay 1st leg; rh – relay heat 1st leg; † – en route to final mark; so – swim-off

=== 100 m backstroke ===
Event	Class	Time		Name	Nation	Date	Games	Location	Ref
100 m backstroke	S1	2:08.01	WR	Hennadii Boiko	Ukraine	9 September 2016	2016 Games	Rio de Janeiro, Brazil	
100 m backstroke	S2	1:45.25	WR	Zou Liankang	China	9 September 2016	2016 Games	Rio de Janeiro, Brazil	
100 m backstroke	S6	1:10.84	WR	Zheng Tao	China	8 September 2016	2016 Games	Rio de Janeiro, Brazil	
100 m backstroke	S7	1:08.14		Andrii Trusov	Ukraine	30 August 2021	2020 Games	Tokyo, Japan	
100 m backstroke	S8	1:02.55	WR	Robert Griswold	United States	27 August 2021	2020 Games	Tokyo, Japan	
100 m backstroke	S9	1:00.76		Yahor Shchalkanau	Neutral Paralympic Athletes	3 September 2024	2024 Games	Paris, France	
100 m backstroke	S10	57.19	WR	Maksym Krypak	Ukraine	2 September 2021	2020 Games	Tokyo, Japan	
100 m backstroke	S11	1:05.84	WR	Mykhailo Serbin	Ukraine	1 September 2024	2024 Games	Paris, France	
100 m backstroke	S12	59.02	WR	Stephen Clegg	Great Britain	31 August 2024	2024 Games	Paris, France	
100 m backstroke	S13	56.36	WR	Ihar Boki	Belarus	26 August 2021	2020 Games	Tokyo, Japan	
100 m backstroke	S14	56.52	h, WR	Benjamin Hance	Australia	6 September 2024	2024 Games	Paris, France	

Legend: # – Record awaiting ratification by IPC; WR – World record; e – equalled existing record;
Records not set in finals: h – heat; r – relay 1st leg; rh – relay heat 1st leg; † – en route to final mark; so – swim-off

=== 200 m backstroke ===
Event	Class	Time	Name	Nation	Date	Games	Location	Ref
200 m backstroke	S11	2:33.42	John Morgan	United States	8 September 1992	1992 Games	Barcelona, Spain	
200 m backstroke	S12	2:33.14	Christopher Holmes	Great Britain	8 September 1992	1992 Games	Barcelona, Spain	
200 m backstroke	S13	2:22.55	Noel Pedersen	Norway	8 September 1992	1992 Games	Barcelona, Spain	

Legend: # – Record awaiting ratification by IPC; WR – World record; e – equalled existing record;
Records not set in finals: h – heat; so – swim-off

=== 50 m breaststroke ===
Event	Class	Time		Name	Nation	Date	Games	Location	Ref
50 m breaststroke	SB1	1:23.16		Aliaksei Talai	Belarus	31 August 2021	2020 Games	Tokyo, Japan	
50 m breaststroke	SB2	50.65	WR	Huang Wenpan	China	14 September 2016	2016 Games	Rio de Janeiro, Brazil	
50 m breaststroke	SB3	46.49	WR	Roman Zhdanov	RPC	25 August 2021	2020 Games	Tokyo, Japan	
50 m breaststroke	SB11	32.45	†	Yang Bozun	China	3 September 2012	2012 Games	London, United Kingdom	
50 m breaststroke	SB12	30.52	†	Uladzimir Izotau	Belarus	8 September 2012	2012 Games	London, United Kingdom	
50 m breaststroke	SB13	29.90	†	Oleksii Fedyna	Ukraine	8 September 2012	2012 Games	London, United Kingdom	

Legend: # – Record awaiting ratification by IPC; WR – World record; e – equalled existing record;
Records not set in finals: h – heat; † – en route to final mark; so – swim-off

=== 100 m breaststroke ===
Event	Class	Time		Name	Nation	Date	Games	Location	Ref
100 m breaststroke	SB4	1:31.96	WR	Dmitrii Cherniaev	RPC	29 August 2021	2020 Games	Tokyo, Japan	
100 m breaststroke	SB5	1:25.13	WR	Andrei Granichka	RPC	28 August 2021	2020 Games	Tokyo, Japan	
100 m breaststroke	SB6	1:18.34		Yang Hong	China	1 September 2024	2024 Games	Paris, France	
100 m breaststroke	SB7	1:10.55		Carlos Serrano Zárate	Colombia	30 August 2024	2024 Games	Paris, France	
100 m breaststroke	SB8	1:07.01	WR	Andriy Kalyna	Ukraine	9 September 2008	2008 Games	Beijing, China	
100 m breaststroke	SB9	1:04.02	WR	Pavel Poltavtsev	Russia	8 September 2012	2012 Games	London, United Kingdom	
100 m breaststroke	SB11	1:10.08	WR	Yang Bozun	China	13 September 2016	2016 Games	Rio de Janeiro, Brazil	
100 m breaststroke	SB12	1:04.83		Nurdaulet Zhumagali	Kazakhstan	5 September 2024	2024 Games	Paris, France	
100 m breaststroke	SB13	1:01.84	h, WR	Taliso Engel	Germany	5 September 2024	2024 Games	Paris, France	
100 m breaststroke	SB14	1:03.77		Naohide Yamaguchi	Japan	29 August 2021	2020 Games	Tokyo, Japan	

Legend: # – Record awaiting ratification by IPC; WR – World record; e – equalled existing record;
Records not set in finals: h – heat; so – swim-off

=== 200 m breaststroke ===
Event	Class	Time		Name	Nation	Date	Games	Location	Ref
200 m breaststroke	SB11	2:42.56	WR	Christian Bundgaard	Denmark	23 August 1996	1996 Games	Atlanta, United States	
200 m breaststroke	SB12	2:35.21		Kingsley Bugarin	Australia	23 August 1996	1996 Games	Atlanta, United States	
200 m breaststroke	SB13	2:33.82	WR	Noel Pedersen	Norway	23 August 1996	1996 Games	Atlanta, United States	

Legend: # – Record awaiting ratification by IPC; WR – World record; e – equalled existing record;
Records not set in finals: h – heat; r – relay 1st leg; rh – relay heat 1st leg; † – en route to final mark; so – swim-off

=== 50 m butterfly ===
Event	Class	Time		Name	Nation	Date	Games	Location	Ref
50 m butterfly	S3	1:11.23		Andrej Zaťko	Slovakia	18 August 1996	1996 Games	Atlanta, United States	
50 m butterfly	S4	40.48		Darko Đurić	Slovenia	7 September 2012	2012 Games	London, United Kingdom	
50 m butterfly	S5	30.28	WR	Guo Jincheng	China	6 September 2024	2024 Games	Paris, France	
50 m butterfly	S6	29.89	WR	Xu Qing	China	9 September 2016	2016 Games	Rio de Janeiro, Brazil	
50 m butterfly	S7	28.41	WR	Pan Shiyun	China	12 September 2016	2016 Games	Rio de Janeiro, Brazil	

Legend: # – Record awaiting ratification by IPC; WR – World record; e – equalled existing record;
Records not set in finals: h – heat; † – en route to final mark; so – swim-off

=== 100 m butterfly ===
Event	Class	Time		Name	Nation	Date	Games	Location	Ref
100 m butterfly	S8	59.19	WR	Song Maodang	China	9 September 2016	2016 Games	Rio de Janeiro, Brazil	
100 m butterfly	S9	57.19	WR	William Martin	Australia	2 September 2021	2020 Games	Tokyo, Japan	
100 m butterfly	S10	54.15	WR	Maksym Krypak	Ukraine	31 August 2021	2020 Games	Tokyo, Japan	
100 m butterfly	S11	1:00.90		Keiichi Kimura	Japan	6 September 2024	2024 Games	Paris, France	
100 m butterfly	S12	56.90		Raman Makarau	Belarus	9 September 2008	2008 Games	Beijing, China	
100 m butterfly	S13	53.80		Ihar Boki	Belarus	25 August 2021	2020 Games	Tokyo, Japan	
100 m butterfly	S14	54.61		Alexander Hillhouse	Denmark	29 August 2024	2024 Games	Paris, France	

Legend: # – Record awaiting ratification by IPC; WR – World record; e – equalled existing record;
Records not set in finals: h – heat; so – swim-off

=== 150 m individual medley ===
Event	Class	Time		Name	Nation	Date	Games	Location	Ref
150 m individual medley	SM2	3:14.02	WR, later rescinded	Gabriel Araújo	Brazil	1 September 2024	2024 Games	Paris, France	
150 m individual medley	SM3	2:40.19	WR	Huang Wenpan	China	16 September 2016	2016 Games	Rio de Janeiro, Brazil	
150 m individual medley	SM4	2:21.17	WR	Roman Zhdanov	RPC	28 August 2021	2020 Games	Tokyo, Japan	

Legend: # – Record awaiting ratification by IPC; WR – World record; e – equalled existing record;
Records not set in finals: h – heat; so – swim-off

=== 200 m individual medley ===
Event	Class	Time		Name	Nation	Date	Games	Location	Ref
200 m individual medley	SM5	2:48.56		Guo Jincheng	China	30 August 2024	2024 Games	Paris, France	
200 m individual medley	SM6	2:37.31	WR	Yang Hong	China	30 August 2024	2024 Games	Paris, France	
200 m individual medley	SM7	2:29.01		Mark Malyar	Israel	27 August 2021	2020 Games	Tokyo, Japan	
200 m individual medley	SM8	2:20.01	WR	Oliver Hynd	Great Britain	12 September 2016	2016 Games	Rio de Janeiro, Brazil	
200 m individual medley	SM9	2:13.31		Timothy Hodge	Australia	5 September 2024	2024 Games	Paris, France	
200 m individual medley	SM10	2:05.68		Maksym Krypak	Ukraine	3 September 2021	2020 Games	Tokyo, Japan	
200 m individual medley	SM11	2:18.36		Rogier Dorsman	Netherlands	3 September 2024	2024 Games	Paris, France	
200 m individual medley	SM12	2:11.12		Danylo Chufarov	Ukraine	10 September 2016	2016 Games	Rio de Janeiro, Brazil	
200 m individual medley	SM13	2:02.03	WR	Ihar Boki	Neutral Paralympic Athletes	3 September 2024	2024 Games	Paris, France	
200 m individual medley	SM14	2:06.05		Nicholas Bennett	Canada	4 September 2024	2024 Games	Paris, France	

Legend: # – Record awaiting ratification by IPC; WR – World record; e – equalled existing record;
Records not set in finals: h – heat; so – swim-off

=== 400 m individual medley ===
Event	Class	Time		Name	Nation	Date	Games	Location	Ref
400 m individual medley	SM11	5:04.31	WR	John Morgan	United States	10 September 1992	1992 Games	Barcelona, Spain	
400 m individual medley	SM12	5:06.77		John Morgan	United States	10 June 1984	1984 Games	United States	
400 m individual medley	SM13	5:05.47		Michael Edgson	Canada	11 September 1992	1992 Games	Barcelona, Spain	
400 m individual medley	SM14								

Legend: # – Record awaiting ratification by IPC; WR – World record; e – equalled existing record;
Records not set in finals: h – heat; r – relay 1st leg; rh – relay heat 1st leg; † – en route to final mark; so – swim-off

=== Freestyle relays ===
Event	Class	Time		Name	Nation	Date	Games	Location	Ref
4×50 m freestyle relay	20 points	2:18.15	WR, defunct	Du Jianping; Tang Yuan; He Junquan; Yang Yuanrun	China	11 September 2008	2008 Games	Beijing, China	
4×100 m freestyle relay	34 points	3:44.31	WR	Rowan Crothers (S10) (51.35); Will Martin (S9) (54.53); Matt Levy (S7) (1:01.30); Ben Popham (S8) (57.13)	Australia	30 August 2021	2020 Games	Tokyo, Japan	
4×100 m freestyle relay	49 points	3:45.97		Dmytro Kuzmin; Sergiy Demchuk; Sergiy Klippert; Dmytro Aleksyeyev	Ukraine	23 September 2004	2004 Games	Athens, Greece	
4×100 m freestyle relay	S14	3:52.84							

Legend: # – Record awaiting ratification by IPC; WR – World record; e – equalled existing record;
Records not set in finals: h – heat; so – swim-off

=== Medley relays ===
Event	Class	Time		Name	Nation	Date	Games	Location	Ref
4×50 m medley relay	20 points	2:33.15	WR, defunct	Du Jianping; Yuan Tang; Xu Qing; Yang Yuanrun	China	15 September 2008	2008 Games	Beijing, China	
4×100 m medley relay	34 points	4:06.44		Zhou Cong (S8) (1:03.08); Lin Furong (SB9) (1:07.08); Song Maodang (S8) (59.86); Wang Yinan (S8) (56.42)	China	17 September 2016	2016 Games	Rio de Janeiro, Brazil	
4×100 m medley relay	49 points	4:13.65		Sergiy Klippert; Oleksandr Mashchenko; Sergiy Demichuk; Dmytro Aleksyeyev	Ukraine	27 September 2004	2004 Games	Athens, Greece	
4×100 m medley relay	S14	4:25.48							

Legend: # – Record awaiting ratification by IPC; WR – World record; e – equalled existing record;
Records not set in finals: h – heat; so – swim-off

== Women's records ==
=== 50 m freestyle ===
Event	Class	Time		Name	Nation	Date	Games	Location	Ref
50 m freestyle	S1	1:28.74		Danielle Watts	Great Britain	13 September 2008	2008 Games	Beijing, China	
50 m freestyle	S2	1:07.56	h, †	Ganna Ielisavetska	Ukraine	3 September 2012	2012 Games	London, United Kingdom	
50 m freestyle	S3	40.03	WR	Leanne Smith	United States	6 September 2024	2024 Games	Paris, France	
50 m freestyle	S4	38.61	h	Lídia Vieira da Cruz	Brazil	6 September 2024	2024 Games	Paris, France	
50 m freestyle	S5	35.83	†	Tully Kearney	Great Britain	26 August 2021	2020 Games	Tokyo, Japan	
50 m freestyle	S6	32.59		Jiang Yuyan	China	29 August 2024	2024 Games	Paris, France	
50 m freestyle	S7	32.42		McKenzie Coan	United States	9 September 2016	2016 Games	Rio de Janeiro, Brazil	
50 m freestyle	S8	29.73		Maddison Elliott	Australia	16 September 2016	2016 Games	Rio de Janeiro, Brazil	
50 m freestyle	S9	27.28	h, WR	Christie Raleigh Crossley	United States	29 August 2024	2024 Games	Paris, France	
50 m freestyle	S10	27.10	WR	Chen Yi	China	29 August 2024	2024 Games	Paris, France	
50 m freestyle	S11	28.96	WR	Ma Jia	China	31 August 2024	2024 Games	Paris, France	
50 m freestyle	S12	26.71		Carol Santiago	Brazil	2 September 2024	2024 Games	Paris, France	
50 m freestyle	S13	27.06		Anna Krivshina	RPC	29 August 2021	2020 Games	Tokyo, Japan	

Legend: # – Record awaiting ratification by IPC; WR – World record; e – equalled existing record;
Records not set in finals: h – heat; r – relay 1st leg; rh – relay heat 1st leg; † – en route to final mark; so – swim-off

=== 100 m freestyle ===
Event	Class	Time		Name	Nation	Date	Games	Location	Ref
100 m freestyle	S1	3:17.54		Elif İldem	Turkey	30 August 2021	2020 Games	Tokyo, Japan	
100 m freestyle	S2	2:03.84		Teresa Perales	Spain	3 September 2024	2024 Games	Paris, France	
100 m freestyle	S3	1:28.81		Leanne Smith	United States	3 September 2024	2024 Games	Paris, France	
100 m freestyle	S4	1:25.78	h	Tanja Scholz	Germany	30 August 2024	2024 Games	Paris, France	
100 m freestyle	S5	1:14.39		Tully Kearney	Great Britain	26 August 2021	2020 Games	Tokyo, Japan	
100 m freestyle	S6	1:09.68	WR	Jiang Yuyan	China	4 September 2024	2024 Games	Paris, France	
100 m freestyle	S7	1:09.21		Giulia Terzi	Italy	31 August 2021	2020 Games	Tokyo, Japan	
100 m freestyle	S8	1:04.73		Maddison Elliott	Australia	11 September 2016	2016 Games	Rio de Janeiro, Brazil	
100 m freestyle	S9	59.53	WR	Alexa Leary	Australia	4 September 2024	2024 Games	Paris, France	
100 m freestyle	S10	58.14	WR	Aurélie Rivard	Canada	28 August 2021	2020 Games	Tokyo, Japan	
100 m freestyle	S11	1:04.88	WR	Daria Lukianenko	Neutral Paralympic Athletes	7 September 2024	2024 Games	Paris, France	
100 m freestyle	S12	58.41	WR	Oxana Savchenko	Russia	4 September 2012	2012 Games	London, Great Britain	
100 m freestyle	S13	58.87		Valérie Grand'Maison	Canada	10 September 2008	2008 Games	Beijing, China	

Legend: # – Record awaiting ratification by IPC; WR – World record; e – equalled existing record;
Records not set in finals: h – heat; r – relay 1st leg; rh – relay heat 1st leg; † – en route to final mark; so – swim-off

=== 200 m freestyle ===
Event	Class	Time		Name	Nation	Date	Games	Location	Ref
200 m freestyle	S3	4:19.57	h	Patricia Valle	Mexico	1 September 2012	2012 Games	London, United Kingdom	
200 m freestyle	S4	3:08.53	h	Tanja Scholz	Germany	29 August 2024	2024 Games	Paris, France	
200 m freestyle	S5	2:44.61		Béatrice Hess	France	23 October 2000	2000 Games		
200 m freestyle	S6	2:35.09	†, WR	Yelyzaveta Mereshko	Ukraine	13 September 2016	2016 Games	Rio de Janeiro, Brazil	
200 m freestyle	S7	2:26.44	†, WR	Jacqueline Freney	Australia	6 September 2012	2012 Games	London, United Kingdom	
200 m freestyle	S11	2:33.32	†, h	Daniela Schulte	Germany	7 September 2012	2012 Games	London, United Kingdom	
200 m freestyle	S12	2:15.94	†	Oxana Savchenko	Russia	30 August 2012	2012 Games	London, United Kingdom	
200 m freestyle	S14	2:03.30		Bethany Firth	Great Britain	11 September 2016	2016 Games	Rio de Janeiro, Brazil	

Legend: # – Record awaiting ratification by IPC; WR – World record; e – equalled existing record;
Records not set in finals: h – heat; † – en route to final mark; so – swim-off

=== 400 m freestyle ===
Event	Class	Time		Name	Nation	Date	Games	Location	Ref
400 m freestyle	S6	5:04.57	WR	Jiang Yuyan	China	2 September 2021	2020 Games	Tokyo, Japan	
400 m freestyle	S7	4:53.88		Morgan Stickney	United States	2 September 2024	2024 Games	Paris, France	
400 m freestyle	S8	4:40.33	WR	Lakeisha Patterson	Australia	8 September 2016	2016 Games	Rio de Janeiro, Brazil	
400 m freestyle	S9	4:23.81	WR	Natalie du Toit	South Africa	12 September 2008	2008 Games	Beijing, China	
400 m freestyle	S10	4:24.08	WR	Aurélie Rivard	Canada	1 September 2021	2020 Games	Tokyo, Japan	
400 m freestyle	S11	4:54.49	WR	Anastasia Pagonis	United States	26 August 2021	2020 Games	Tokyo, Japan	
400 m freestyle	S12	4:36.17		Anna Stetsenko	Ukraine	31 August 2024	2024 Games	Paris, France	
400 m freestyle	S13	4:19.59	WR	Rebecca Meyers	United States	12 September 2016	2016 Games	Rio de Janeiro, Brazil	

Legend: # – Record awaiting ratification by IPC; WR – World record; e – equalled existing record;
Records not set in finals: h – heat; so – swim-off

=== 50 m backstroke ===
Event	Class	Time		Name	Nation	Date	Games	Location	Ref
50 m backstroke	S1	1:13.64		Ganna Ielisavetska	Ukraine	15 September 2008	2008 Games	Beijing, China	
50 m backstroke	S2	59.38	†, WR	Yip Pin Xiu	Singapore	10 September 2016	2016 Games	Rio de Janeiro, Brazil	
50 m backstroke	S3	48.49	WR	Peng Qiuping	China	10 September 2016	2016 Games	Rio de Janeiro, Brazil	
50 m backstroke	S4	44.68	WR	Liu Yu	China	3 September 2021	2016 Games	Tokyo, Japan	
50 m backstroke	S5	37.18	WR	Lu Dong	China	30 August 2021	2020 Games	Tokyo, Japan	

Legend: # – Record awaiting ratification by IPC; WR – World record; e – equalled existing record;
Records not set in finals: h – heat; r – relay 1st leg; rh – relay heat 1st leg; † – en route to final mark; so – swim-off

=== 100 m backstroke ===
Event	Class	Time		Name	Nation	Date	Games	Location	Ref
100 m backstroke	S2	2:07.09	WR	Yip Pin Xiu	Singapore	10 September 2016	2016 Games	Rio de Janeiro, Brazil	
100 m backstroke	S6	1:19.44	WR	Jiang Yuyan	China	7 September 2024	2024 Games	Paris, France	
100 m backstroke	S7	1:21.27		Mallory Weggemann	United States	30 August 2021	2020 Games	Tokyo, Japan	
100 m backstroke	S8	1:09.06		Alice Tai	Great Britain	31 August 2024	2024 Games	Paris, France	
100 m backstroke	S9	1:07.92		Christie Raleigh Crossley	United States	3 September 2024	2024 Games	Paris, France	
100 m backstroke	S10	1:05.90		Summer Mortimer	Canada	4 September 2012	2012 Games	London, United Kingdom	
100 m backstroke	S11	1:13.46	WR	Cai Liwen	China	28 August 2021	2020 Games	Tokyo, Japan	
100 m backstroke	S12	1:06.06	WR	Hannah Russell	Great Britain	14 September 2016	2016 Games	Rio de Janeiro, Brazil	
100 m backstroke	S13	1:04.64	WR	Gia Pergolini	United States	26 August 2021	2020 Games	Tokyo, Japan	
100 m backstroke	S14	1:04.05	WR	Bethany Firth	Great Britain	8 September 2016	2016 Games	Rio de Janeiro, Brazil	

Legend: # – Record awaiting ratification by IPC; WR – World record; e – equalled existing record;
Records not set in finals: h – heat; r – relay 1st leg; rh – relay heat 1st leg; † – en route to final mark; so – swim-off

=== 200 m backstroke ===
Event	Class	Time		Name	Nation	Date	Games	Location	Ref
200 m backstroke	S11	3:20.28		Mary Ann Low	Great Britain	8 Sep 1992	1992 Games		
200 m backstroke	S12	2:31.13	WR	Trischa Zorn	United States	8 Sep 1992	1992 Games		

Legend: # – Record awaiting ratification by IPC; WR – World record; e – equalled existing record;
Records not set in finals: h – heat; so – swim-off

=== 50 m breaststroke ===
Event	Class	Time		Name	Nation	Date	Games	Location	Ref
50 m breaststroke	SB1	1:43.89		Live Tone Lind	Norway	8 Sep 1992	1992 Games		
50 m breaststroke	SB2	1:10.37	h	Ellie Challis	Great Britain	31 August 2021	2020 Games	Tokyo, Japan	
50 m breaststroke	SB3	53.25		Monica Boggioni	Italy	4 September 2024	2024 Games	Paris, France	
50 m breaststroke	SB5	43.48	†, WR	Kirsten Bruhn	Germany	5 September 2012	2012 Games	London, Great Britain	
50 m breaststroke	SB11	41.18	†	Maja Reichard	Sweden	3 September 2012	2012 Games	London, Great Britain	
50 m breaststroke	SB12	35.64	†	Karolina Pelendritou	Cyprus	8 September 2012	2012 Games	London, Great Britain	
50 m breaststroke	SB13	35.64	†	Prue Watt	Australia	8 September 2012	2012 Games	London, Great Britain	
50 m breaststroke	SB13	33.70	†, WR, not ratified	Rebecca Redfern	Great Britain	1 September 2021	2020 Games	Tokyo, Japan	

Legend: # – Record awaiting ratification by IPC; WR – World record; e – equalled existing record;
Records not set in finals: h – heat; † – en route to final mark; so – swim-off

=== 100 m breaststroke ===
Event	Class	Time		Name	Nation	Date	Games	Location	Ref
100 m breaststroke	SB4	1:43.99		Nataliia Prologaieva	Ukraine	4 September 2012	2012 Games		
100 m breaststroke	SB5	1:35.03	h	Kirsten Bruhn	Germany	5 September 2012	2012 Games		
100 m breaststroke	SB6	1:31.30		Maisie Summers-Newton	Great Britain	1 September 2024	2024 Games	Paris, France	
100 m breaststroke	SB7	1:26.09	WR	Mariia Pavlova	Neutral Paralympic Athletes	5 September 2024	2024 Games	Paris, France	
100 m breaststroke	SB8	1:17.17		Olesya Vladykina	Russia	1 September 2012	2012 Games		
100 m breaststroke	SB9	1:10.99	WR	Chantalle Zijderveld	Netherlands	26 August 2021	2020 Games	Tokyo, Japan	
100 m breaststroke	SB11	1:18.31		Daria Lukianenko	Neutral Paralympic Athletes	5 September 2024	2024 Games	Paris, France	
100 m breaststroke	SB12	1:12.54	WR	Elena Krawzow	Germany	5 September 2024	2024 Games	Paris, France	
100 m breaststroke	SB13	1:12.45		Fotimakhon Amilova	Uzbekistan	11 September 2016	2016 Games	Rio de Janeiro, Brazil	
100 m breaststroke	SB14	1:12.02	WR	Michelle Alonso	Spain	29 August 2021	2020 Games	Tokyo, Japan	

Legend: # – Record awaiting ratification by IPC; WR – World record; e – equalled existing record;
Records not set in finals: h – heat; † – en route to final mark; so – swim-off

=== 200 m breaststroke ===
Event	Class	Time	Name	Nation	Date	Games	Location	Ref
200 m breaststroke	SB11	3:13.19	Magdalena Tjernberg	Sweden	18 Oct 1988	1998 Games		
200 m breaststroke	SB12	3:04.16	Trischa Zorn	United States	6 Sep 1992	1992 Games		
200 m breaststroke	SB13	3:03.24	Gabrielle Tjernberg	Sweden	18 Oct 1988	1998 Games		

Legend: # – Record awaiting ratification by IPC; WR – World record; e – equalled existing record;
Records not set in finals: h – heat; so – swim-off

=== 50 m butterfly ===
Event	Class	Time		Name	Nation	Date	Games	Location	Ref
50 m butterfly	S3	58.84		Patricia Valle	Mexico	22 September 2004	2004 Games	Athens, Greece	
50 m butterfly	S4	40.22	WR	Marta Fernández Infante	Spain	27 August 2021	2020 Games	Tokyo, Japan	
50 m butterfly	S5	38.17	WR	Lu Dong	China	6 September 2024	2024 Games	Paris, France	
50 m butterfly	S6	34.56	h	Jiang Yuyan	China	30 August 2021	2020 Games	Tokyo, Japan	
50 m butterfly	S7	32.99	WR	Danielle Dorris	Canada	3 September 2021	2020 Games	Tokyo, Japan	

Legend: # – Record awaiting ratification by IPC; WR – World record; e – equalled existing record;
Records not set in finals: h – heat; † – en route to final mark; so – swim-off

=== 100 m butterfly ===
Event	Class	Time		Name	Nation	Date	Games	Location	Ref
100 m butterfly	S8	1:09.04		Kateryna Istomina	Ukraine	9 September 2016	2016 Games	Rio de Janeiro, Brazil	
100 m butterfly	S9	1:05.19		Christie Raleigh Crossley	United States	6 September 2024	2024 Games	Paris, France	
100 m butterfly	S10	1:02.65		Sophie Pascoe	New Zealand	12 September 2016	2016 Games	Rio de Janeiro, Brazil	
100 m butterfly	S11	1:20.50		Elaine Barrett	Great Britain	26 Oct 2000	2000 Games		
100 m butterfly	S12	1:03.34		Joanna Mendak	Poland	9 Sep 2008	2008 Games		
100 m butterfly	S13	1:02.65		Carlotta Gilli	Italy	25 August 2021	2020 Games	Tokyo, Japan	
100 m butterfly	S14	1:03.00	WR	Poppy Maskill	Great Britain	29 August 2024	2024 Games	Paris, France	

Legend: # – Record awaiting ratification by IPC; WR – World record; e – equalled existing record;
Records not set in finals: h – heat; so – swim-off

=== 150 m individual medley ===
Event	Class	Time		Name	Nation	Date	Games	Location	Ref
150 m individual medley	SM3	2:54.14		Tanja Scholz	Germany	1 September 2024	2024 Games	Paris, France	
150 m individual medley	SM4	2:39.39	h, WR	Liu Yu	China	28 August 2021	2020 Games	Tokyo, Japan	

Legend: # – Record awaiting ratification by IPC; WR – World record; e – equalled existing record;
Records not set in finals: h – heat; so – swim-off

=== 200 m individual medley ===
Event	Class	Time		Name	Nation	Date	Games	Location	Ref
200 m individual medley	SM5	3:13.43	WR	Nataliia Ziani	Ukraine	31 August 2012	2012 Games		
200 m individual medley	SM6	2:56.68		Maisie Summers-Newton	Great Britain	26 August 2021	2020 Games	Tokyo, Japan	
200 m individual medley	SM7	2:53.29		Mallory Weggemann	United States	31 August 2024	2024 Games	Paris, France	
200 m individual medley	SM8	2:37.09		Jessica Long	United States	5 September 2012	2012 Games		
200 m individual medley	SM9	2:27.83		Natalie du Toit	South Africa	11 Sep 2008	2008 Games		
200 m individual medley	SM10	2:24.85	WR	Chantalle Zijderveld	Netherlands	3 September 2021	2020 Games	Tokyo, Japan	
200 m individual medley	SM11	2:37.77	WR	Daria Lukianenko	Neutral Paralympic Athletes	3 September 2024	2024 Games	Paris, France	
200 m individual medley	SM12	2:28.00		Oxana Savchenko	Russia	3 September 2012	2012 Games	London, Great Britain	
200 m individual medley	SM13	2:21.44	WR	Carlotta Gilli	Italy	30 August 2021	2020 Games	Tokyo, Japan	
200 m individual medley	S14	2:19.55		Bethany Firth	Great Britain	17 September 2016	2016 Games	Rio de Janeiro, Brazil	

Legend: # – Record awaiting ratification by IPC; WR – World record; e – equalled existing record;
Records not set in finals: h – heat; so – swim-off

=== 400 m individual medley ===
Event	Class	Time	Name	Nation	Date	Games	Location	Ref
400 m individual medley	SM11	6:51.27	Andrea Rossi	Canada	Jun 1984	1984 Games		
400 m individual medley	SM12	5:29.76	Trischa Zorn	United States	10 Sep 1992	1992 Games		
400 m individual medley	SM13	5:43.46	Debra Brandewie	United States	21 Oct 1988	1998 Games		

Legend: # – Record awaiting ratification by IPC; WR – World record; e – equalled existing record;
Records not set in finals: h – heat; so – swim-off

=== Freestyle relays ===
Event	Class	Time		Name	Nation	Date	Games	Location	Ref
4×50 m freestyle relay	20 points	3:00.62		Erika Nara; Noriko Kajiwara; Takako Fujita; Mayumi Narita	Japan	24 September 2004	2004 Games	Athens, Greece	
4×100 m freestyle relay	34 points	4:16.65	WR	Ellie Cole (S9) (1:02.92); Lakeisha Patterson (S8) (1:04.96); Maddison Elliott (S8) (1:05.10); Ashleigh McConnell (S9) (1:03.67)	Australia	15 September 2016	2016 Games	Rio de Janeiro, Brazil	

Legend: # – Record awaiting ratification by IPC; WR – World record; e – equalled existing record;
Records not set in finals: h – heat; so – swim-off

=== Medley relays ===
Event	Class	Time	Name	Nation	Date	Games	Location	Ref
4×50 m medley relay	20 points	3:10.37	Anne Cecile Lequien; Virginie Tripier; Béatrice Hess; Ludivine Loiseau	France	28 October 2000	2000 Games	Sydney, Australia	
4×100 m medley relay	34 points	4:45.23	Alice Tai (S10) (1:10.28); Claire Cashmore (SB8) (1:20.00); Stephanie Slater (S8) (1:09.74); Stephanie Millward (S8) (1:05.21)	Great Britain	16 September 2016	2016 Games	Rio de Janeiro, Brazil	

Legend: # – Record awaiting ratification by IPC; WR – World record; e – equalled existing record;
Records not set in finals: h – heat; so – swim-off

== Mixed relays ==
=== Freestyle relays ===
Event	Class	Time		Name	Nation	Date	Games	Location	Ref
4×50 m freestyle relay	20 points	2:14.98	WR	Peng Qiuping (S4) (43.13); Yuan Weiyi (S5) (30.63); Jiang Yuyan (S6) (32.43); Guo Jincheng (S5) (28.79)	China	30 August 2024	2024 Games	Paris, France	
4×100 m freestyle relay	S14	3:40.63	WR	Reece Dunn (51.15); Bethany Firth (57.77); Jessica-Jane Applegate (59.03); Jordan Catchpole (52.68)	Great Britain	28 August 2021	2020 Games	Tokyo, Japan	
4×100 m freestyle relay	34 points	4:01.54							
4×100 m freestyle relay	49 points	3:53.79		Ilnur Garipov (S11) (1:01.68); Anna Krivshina (S13) (58.60); Daria Pikalova (S12) (59.06); Vladimir Sotnikov (S13) (54.45)	RPC	31 August 2021	2020 Games	Tokyo, Japan	

Legend: # – Record awaiting ratification by IPC; WR – World record; e – equalled existing record;
Records not set in finals: h – heat; so – swim-off

=== Medley relays ===
Event	Class	Time		Name	Nation	Date	Games	Location	Ref
4×50 m medley relay	20 points	2:24.83	WR	Lu Dong (S5) (37.18); Zhang Li (SB5) (46.64); Wang Lichao (S5) (31.78); Guo Jincheng (S5) (29.23)	China	5 September 2024	2024 Games	Paris, France	
4×100 m medley relay	34 points	4:27.08		Jesse Aungles (S8) (1:08.18); Timothy Hodge (SB8) (1:11.66); Emily Beecroft (S9) (1:07.36); Alexa Leary (S9) (59.88)	Australia	2 September 2024	2024 Games	Paris, France	

Legend: # – Record awaiting ratification by IPC; WR – World record; e – equalled existing record;
Records not set in finals: h – heat; so – swim-off

== See also ==
- List of IPC world records in swimming
- Swimming at the Summer Paralympics
- List of Olympic records in swimming
