= List of IPC world records in swimming – Men's long course =

The world records in disability swimming are ratified by the International Paralympic Committee (IPC). These are the fastest performances in swimming events at meets sanctioned by the IPC.

This article lists the men's world records in long course competition. The International Paralympic Committee provides information on the current world records at their official site, though the times present sometimes differ from those provided elsewhere.

== 50 m freestyle ==
Event	Class	Time		Name	Nation	Date	Meet	Location	Ref
50 m freestyle	S1	1:03.80		Izhak Mamistvalov	Israel	11 March 2014	Danish Open	Esbjerg, Denmark	
50 m freestyle	S2	50.65		Zou Liankang	China	11 September 2016	Paralympic Games	Rio de Janeiro, Brazil	
50 m freestyle	S2	46.85	h, not ratified or later rescinded	Josia Topf	Germany	19 June 2021	International German Championships	Berlin, Germany	
50 m freestyle	S3	38.81		Huang Wenpan	China	6 December 2017	IPC Championships	Mexico City, Mexico	
50 m freestyle	S4	35.61		Sebastian Massabie	Canada	6 September 2024	Paralympic Games	Paris, France	
50 m freestyle	S5	29.33		Guo Jincheng	China	5 September 2024	Paralympic Games	Paris, France	
50 m freestyle	S6	28.57		Xu Qing	China	4 September 2012	Paralympic Games	London, Great Britain	
50 m freestyle	S7	26.38		Andrii Trusov	Ukraine	4 September 2024	Paralympic Games	Paris, France	
50 m freestyle	S8	25.32		Denis Tarasov	Russia	10 August 2014	European Championships	Eindhoven, Netherlands	
50 m freestyle	S9	23.90		Simone Barlaam	Italy	2 September 2024	Paralympic Games	Paris, France	
50 m freestyle	S10	23.16		André Brasil	Brazil	31 August 2012	Paralympic Games	London, Great Britain	
50 m freestyle	S11	25.27		Yang Bozun	China	1 September 2012	Paralympic Games	London, Great Britain	
50 m freestyle	S12	22.99		Maksym Veraksa	Ukraine	21 Oct 2009	European Championships	Reykjavík, Iceland	
50 m freestyle	S13	23.20		Ihar Boki	Belarus	13 July 2015	World Championships	Glasgow, Great Britain	
50 m freestyle	S14	24.37	defunct category	Ricky Betar	Australia	11 April 2019	Australian Championships	Adelaide, Australia	

Legend: # – Record awaiting ratification by IPC; e – equalled existing record;
Records not set in finals: h – heat; sf – semifinal; r – relay 1st leg; rh – relay heat 1st leg; b – B final; † – en route to final mark; so – swim-off

== 100 m freestyle ==
Event	Class	Time		Name	Nation	Date	Meet	Location	Ref
100 m freestyle	S1	2:15.83	†	Izhak Mamistvalov	Israel	1 September 2012	Paralympic Games	London, United Kingdom	
100 m freestyle	S2	1:46.63	†	Liu Benying	China	11 September 2016	Paralympic Games	Rio de Janeiro, Brazil	
100 m freestyle	S3	1:32.69		Diego Lopez Diaz	Spain	8 June 2018	World Series	Berlin, Germany	
100 m freestyle	S4	1:18.94		Ami Omer Dadaon	Israel	1 August 2023	World Para Championships	Manchester, United Kingdom	
100 m freestyle	S5	1:06.24		Antonio Fantin	Italy	3 March 2019	—	Bologna, Italy	
100 m freestyle	S6	1:02.70		Antonio Fantin	Italy	14 March 2024	-	Lignano Sabbiadoro, Italy	
100 m freestyle	S7	59.62		Andrii Trusov	Ukraine	27 April 2024	World Para European Open Championships	Funchal, Portugal	
100 m freestyle	S8	55.84		Denis Tarasov	Russia	16 July 2015	World Championships	Glasgow, Great Britain	
100 m freestyle	S9	52.23		Simone Barlaam	Italy	15 June 2022	World Para Championships	Funchal, Portugal	
100 m freestyle	S10	50.64		Maksym Krypak	Ukraine	28 August 2021	Paralympic Games	Tokyo, Japan	
100 m freestyle	S11	55.34		David Kratochvil	Czech Republic	12 March 2026	Para Swimming World Series	Lignano Sabbiadoro, Italy	
100 m freestyle	S12	50.91		Maksym Veraksa	Ukraine	24 October 2009	European Championships	Reykjavík, Iceland	
100 m freestyle	S13	50.65		Ihar Boki	Belarus	18 August 2018	European Championships	Dublin, Ireland	
100 m freestyle	S14	50.41		William Ellard	Great Britain	16 April 2026	British Championships	London, United Kingdom	

Legend: # – Record awaiting ratification by IPC; e – equalled existing record;
Records not set in finals: h – heat; sf – semifinal; r – relay 1st leg; rh – relay heat 1st leg; b – B final; † – en route to final mark; so – swim-off

== 200 m freestyle ==
Event	Class	Time		Name	Nation	Date	Meet	Location	Ref
200 m freestyle	S1	4:39.31		Kamil Otowski	Poland	18 November 2023	-	Szczecin, Poland	
200 m freestyle	S2	3:41.54		Liu Benying	China	11 September 2016	Paralympic Games	Rio de Janeiro, Brazil	
200 m freestyle	S3	3:09.04		Huang Wenpan	China	15 September 2016	Paralympic Games	Rio de Janeiro, Brazil	
200 m freestyle	S4	2:44.84		Ami Omer Dadaon	Israel	30 August 2021	Paralympic Games	Tokyo, Japan	
200 m freestyle	S5	2:23.65		Francesco Bocciardo	Italy	13 August 2018	European Championships	Dublin, Ireland	
200 m freestyle	S6	2:17.20		Antonio Fantin	Italy	19 June 2025	International German Championships	Berlin, Germany	
200 m freestyle	S7	2:11.30		Federico Bicelli	Italy	30 May 2024	International German Championships	Berlin, Germany	
200 m freestyle	S8	2:07.16	h	Dimosthenis Michalentzakis	Greece	6 June 2019	International German Championships	Berlin, Germany	
200 m freestyle	S9	1:56.87		Simone Barlaam	Italy	11 May 2023	International German Championships	Berlin, Germany	
200 m freestyle	S10	1:54.46		André Brasil Esteves	Brazil	29 May 2009	International German Championships	Berlin, Germany	
200 m freestyle	S11	2:04.58		John Morgan	United States	21 Jul 1990	-	Drachten, Netherlands	
200 m freestyle	S12	1:58.36		Raman Salei	Azerbaijan	11 May 2023	International German Championships	Berlin, Germany	
200 m freestyle	S13	1:50.34		Ihar Boki	Belarus	6 June 2019	International German Championships	Berlin, Germany	
200 m freestyle	S14	1:51.08		William Ellard	Great Britain	21 September 2025	World Para Championships	Singapore, Singapore	

Legend: # – Record awaiting ratification by IPC; e – equalled existing record;
Records not set in finals: h – heat; sf – semifinal; r – relay 1st leg; rh – relay heat 1st leg; b – B final; † – en route to final mark; so – swim-off

== 400 m freestyle ==
Event	Class	Time	Name	Nation	Date	Meet	Location	Ref
400 m freestyle	S6	4:47.75	Anders Olsson	Sweden	18 October 2009	European Championships	Reykjavík, Iceland	
400 m freestyle	S7	4:31.06	Mark Malyar	Israel	29 August 2021	Paralympic Games	Tokyo, Japan	
400 m freestyle	S8	4:19.74	Oliver Hynd	Great Britain	25 July 2017	British Championships	Sheffield, Great Britain	
400 m freestyle	S9	4:09.93	Brenden Hall	Australia	16 August 2013	World Championships	Montreal, Canada	
400 m freestyle	S10	3:57.71	Maksym Krypak	Ukraine	15 September 2016	Paralympic Games	Rio de Janeiro, Brazil	
400 m freestyle	S11	4:19.83	David Kratochvil	Czech Republic	27 September 2025	World Para Championships	Singapore, Singapore	
400 m freestyle	S12	4:05.95	Danylo Chufarov	Ukraine	16 August 2013	World Championships	Montreal, Canada	
400 m freestyle	S13	3:55.56	Ihar Boki	Belarus	16 August 2013	World Championships	Montreal, Canada	
400 m freestyle	S14	4:05.47	Liam Schluter	Australia	5 April 2021	-	Gold Coast, Australia	

Legend: # – Record awaiting ratification by IPC; e – equalled existing record;
Records not set in finals: h – heat; sf – semifinal; r – relay 1st leg; rh – relay heat 1st leg; b – B final; † – en route to final mark; so – swim-off

== 800 m freestyle ==
Event	Class	Time	Name	Nation	Date	Meet	Location	Ref
800 m freestyle	S6	10:01.80	Anders Olsson	Sweden	24 May 2007	-	Berlin, Germany	
800 m freestyle	S7	9:44.19	Mark Malyar	Israel	18 June 2021	International German Championships	Berlin, Germany	
800 m freestyle	S8	9:12.26	Oliver Hynd	Great Britain	7 July 2017	31st International German Championships	Berlin, Germany	
800 m freestyle	S9	8:36.64	Brenden Hall	Australia	17 April 2015	29th International German Championships	Berlin, Germany	
800 m freestyle	S10	8:31.40	Bas Takken	Netherlands	7 July 2017	31st International German Championships	Berlin, Germany	
800 m freestyle	S11	9:36.61	Uchu Tomita	Japan	8 June 2018	International German Championships	Berlin, Germany	
800 m freestyle	S12	8:38.56	Dmitriy Horlin	Uzbekistan	8 June 2018	International German Championships	Berlin, Germany	
800 m freestyle	S13	8:35.66	Ihar Boki	Belarus	7 June 2019	International German Championships	Berlin, Germany	
800 m freestyle	S14	8:46.24	William Ellard	Great Britain	20 June 2025	International German Championships	Berlin, Germany	

Legend: # – Record awaiting ratification by IPC; e – equalled existing record;
Records not set in finals: h – heat; sf – semifinal; r – relay 1st leg; rh – relay heat 1st leg; b – B final; † – en route to final mark; so – swim-off

== 1500 m freestyle ==
Event	Class	Time		Name	Nation	Date	Meet	Location	Ref
1500 m freestyle	S6	21:59.02		Thijs van Hofweegen	Netherlands	4 May 2023	-	Amersfoort, Netherlands	
1500 m freestyle	S7	19:50.16		Alex Dionne	Canada	15 July 2011	-	Gatineau, Canada	
1500 m freestyle	S7	19:27.26	not ratified	Mark Malyar	Israel	9 February 2019	Israeli Championships	Netanya, Israel	
1500 m freestyle	S8	17:42.44		Matthew Torres	United States	17 December 2021	-	Greensboro, United States	
1500 m freestyle	S9	16:34.12		Brenden Hall	Australia	18 Dec 2012	Qld Swimming Championships	Brisbane, Australia	
1500 m freestyle	S10	16:19.70		Ian Silverman	United States	27 March 2014	-	Miami, United States	
1500 m freestyle	S11	19:02.11		Donovan Tildesley	Canada	13 Jul 2008	-	Victoria, Canada	
1500 m freestyle	S12	18:57.10		Jeff Hardy	Australia	16 Nov 1997	-	Brisbane, Australia	
1500 m freestyle	S13	16:33.79		Charl Bouwer	South Africa	16 April 2011	South African Championships	Port Elizabeth, South Africa	
1500 m freestyle	S14	16:41.40		Liam Schluter	Australia	17 October 2019	-	Brisbane, Australia	

Legend: # – Record awaiting ratification by IPC; e – equalled existing record;
Records not set in finals: h – heat; sf – semifinal; r – relay 1st leg; rh – relay heat 1st leg; b – B final; † – en route to final mark; so – swim-off

== 50 m backstroke ==
Event	Class	Time		Name	Nation	Date	Meet	Location	Ref
50 m backstroke	S1	59.96	†	Hennadii Boiko	Ukraine	9 September 2016	Paralympic Games	Rio de Janeiro, Brazil	
50 m backstroke	S2	47.17		Zou Liankang	China	15 September 2016	Paralympic Games	Rio de Janeiro, Brazil	
50 m backstroke	S3	42.21	†	Min Byeong-Eon	South Korea	2 September 2012	Paralympic Games	London, Great Britain	
50 m backstroke	S4	40.99		Roman Zhdanov	Russia	3 September 2021	Paralympic Games	Tokyo, Japan	
50 m backstroke	S5	31.42		Tao Zheng	China	30 August 2021	Paralympic Games	Tokyo, Japan	
50 m backstroke	S6	31.47		Wang Jingang	China	25 October 2023	-	Hangzhou, China	
50 m backstroke	S7	32.56	†	Jonathan Fox	Great Britain	30 August 2012	Paralympic Games	London, United Kingdom	
50 m backstroke	S8	29.97		Robert Griswold	United States	7 June 2019	International German Championships	Berlin, Germany	
50 m backstroke	S9	27.81		Simone Barlaam	Italy	11 August 2020	-	Rome, Italy	
50 m backstroke	S10	27.86		André Brasil	Brazil	24 May 2013	27th International IPC German Championships	Berlin, Germany	
50 m backstroke	S11	30.27		Albert Gelis	Spain	11 May 2026	International German Championships	Berlin, Germany	
50 m backstroke	S12	27.79		Stephen Clegg	Great Britain	12 May 2023	International German Championships	Berlin, Germany	
50 m backstroke	S13	26.21		Ihar Boki	Belarus	8 June 2018	International German Championships	Berlin, Germany	

Legend: # – Record awaiting ratification by IPC; e – equalled existing record;
Records not set in finals: h – heat; sf – semifinal; r – relay 1st leg; rh – relay heat 1st leg; b – B final; † – en route to final mark; so – swim-off

== 100 m backstroke ==
Event	Class	Time		Name	Nation	Date	Meet	Location	Ref
100 m backstroke	S1	2:08.01		Hennadii Boiko	Ukraine	9 September 2016	Paralympic Games	Rio de Janeiro, Brazil	
100 m backstroke	S2	1:45.25		Zou Liankang	China	9 September 2016	Paralympic Games	Rio de Janeiro, Brazil	
100 m backstroke	S3	1:32.83		Diego López Díaz	Mexico	10 June 2018	International German Championships	Berlin, Germany	
100 m backstroke	S4	1:33.54		Matz Topkin	Estonia	9 June 2019	International German Championships	Berlin, Germany	
100 m backstroke	S5	1:16.24	r	Daniel Dias	Brazil	17 September 2016	Paralympic Games	Rio de Janeiro, Brazil	
100 m backstroke	S6	1:10.84		Zheng Tao	China	8 September 2016	Paralympic Games	Rio de Janeiro, Brazil	
100 m backstroke	S7	1:07.60		Andrii Trusov	Ukraine	24 April 2024	World Para European Open Championships	Funchal, Portugal	
100 m backstroke	S8	1:02.55		Robert Griswold	United States	27 August 2021	Paralympic Games	Tokyo, Japan	
100 m backstroke	S9	59.72		Simone Barlaam	Italy	17 June 2022	World Para Championships	Funchal, Portugal	
100 m backstroke	S10	57.19		Maksym Krypak	Ukraine	2 September 2021	Paralympic Games	Tokyo, Japan	
100 m backstroke	S11	1:05.14		Albert Gelis	Spain	26 September 2025	World Para Championships	Singapore, Singapore	
100 m backstroke	S12	59.02		Stephen Clegg	Great Britain	31 August 2024	Paralympic Games	Paris, France	
100 m backstroke	S13	56.36		Ihar Boki	Belarus	26 August 2021	Paralympic Games	Tokyo, Japan	
100 m backstroke	S14	55.99	h	Benjamin Hance	Australia	22 September 2025	World Para Championships	Singapore, Singapore	

Legend: # – Record awaiting ratification by IPC; e – equalled existing record;
Records not set in finals: h – heat; sf – semifinal; r – relay 1st leg; rh – relay heat 1st leg; b – B final; † – en route to final mark; so – swim-off

== 200 m backstroke ==
Event	Class	Time	Name	Nation	Date	Meet	Location	Ref
200 m backstroke	S6	2:40.83	Luca da Prato	Italy	11 May 2026	International German Championships	Berlin, Germany	
200 m backstroke	S7	2:32.68	Jonathan Fox	Great Britain	6 July 2017	31st International German Championships	Berlin, Germany	
200 m backstroke	S8	2:17.77	Robert Griswold	United States	6 July 2017	31st International German Championships	Berlin, Germany	
200 m backstroke	S9	2:15.76	Jarrett Perry	United States	7 December 2007	-	College Park, United States	
200 m backstroke	S10	2:06.41	Olivier van de Voort	Netherlands	6 July 2017	31st International German Championships	Berlin, Germany	
200 m backstroke	S11	2:25.59	David Kratochvil	Czech Republic	30 May 2024	International German Championships	Berlin, Germany	
200 m backstroke	S12	2:18.08	Stephen Clegg	Great Britain	31 March 2016	-	Glasgow, United Kingdom	
200 m backstroke	S13	2:06.29	Ihar Boki	Belarus	6 June 2019	International German Championships	Berlin, Germany	
200 m backstroke	S14	2:08.21	Mark Tompsett	Great Britain	19 April 2026	-	London, United Kingdom	

Legend: # – Record awaiting ratification by IPC; e – equalled existing record;
Records not set in finals: h – heat; sf – semifinal; r – relay 1st leg; rh – relay heat 1st leg; b – B final; † – en route to final mark; so – swim-off

== 50 m breaststroke ==
Event	Class	Time		Name	Nation	Date	Meet	Location	Ref
50 m breaststroke	SB1	1:18.42		Aliaksei Talai	Belarus	17 April 2021	-	Lignano Sabbiadoro, Italy	
50 m breaststroke	SB2	50.65		Huang Wenpan	China	14 September 2016	Paralympic Games	Rio de Janeiro, Brazil	
50 m breaststroke	SB3	46.49		Roman Zhdanov	Russia	25 August 2021	Paralympic Games	Tokyo, Japan	
50 m breaststroke	SB4	42.41		Moisés Fuentes	Colombia	2 April 2022	International German Championships	Berlin, Germany	
50 m breaststroke	SB5	39.98		Antoni Ponce	Spain	19 June 2021	International German Championships	Berlin, Germany	
50 m breaststroke	SB6	34.95		Nelson Crispín	Colombia	1 June 2024	International German Championships	Berlin, Germany	
50 m breaststroke	SB7	31.96		Carlos Serrano Zárate	Colombia	1 June 2024	International German Championships	Berlin, Germany	
50 m breaststroke	SB8	31.57	†	Andriy Kalyna	Ukraine	1 September 2012	Paralympic Games	London, United Kingdom	
50 m breaststroke	SB9	29.16		Pavel Poltavtsev	Russia	29 June 2010	International German Championships	Berlin, Germany	
50 m breaststroke	SB11	31.35		Keiichi Kumura	Japan	16 September 2018	-	Yucaipa, United States	
50 m breaststroke	SB12	30.29		Artur Saifutdinov	Russia	8 June 2019	International German Championships	Berlin, Germany	
50 m breaststroke	SB13	28.01		Taliso Engel	Germany	12 May 2026	International German Championships	Berlin, Germany	

Legend: # – Record awaiting ratification by IPC; e – equalled existing record;
Records not set in finals: h – heat; sf – semifinal; r – relay 1st leg; rh – relay heat 1st leg; b – B final; † – en route to final mark; so – swim-off

== 100 m breaststroke ==
Event	Class	Time	Name	Nation	Date	Meet	Location	Ref
100 m breaststroke	SB1	3:04.95	Janis McDavid	Germany	10 May 2026	International German Championships	Berlin, Germany	
100 m breaststroke	SB2	2:09.40	Ioannis Kostakis	Greece	1 July 2017	-	Athens, Greece	
100 m breaststroke	SB3	1:49.93	Ahmed Kelly	Australia	17 January 2015	-	Melbourne, Australia	
100 m breaststroke	SB4	1:31.96	Dmitrii Cherniaev	Russia	29 August 2021	Paralympic Games	Tokyo, Japan	
100 m breaststroke	SB5	1:24.65	Kirill Aleksandrov	Russia	11 September 2026	-	Kocaeli, Turkey	
100 m breaststroke	SB6	1:17.59	Nelson Crispín	Colombia	30 May 2024	International German Championships	Berlin, Germany	
100 m breaststroke	SB7	1:10.32	Carlos Serrano Zárate	Colombia	6 August 2023	-	Manchester, United Kingdom	
100 m breaststroke	SB8	1:07.01	Andriy Kalyna	Ukraine	9 September 2008	Paralympic Games	Beijing, China	
100 m breaststroke	SB9	1:04.02	Pavel Poltavtsev	Russia	8 September 2012	Paralympic Games	London, United Kingdom	
100 m breaststroke	SB11	1:09.61	Rogier Dorsman	Netherlands	18 April 2026	-	Rotterdam, Netherlands	
100 m breaststroke	SB12	1:04.07	Oleksii Fedyna	Ukraine	4 August 2014	European Championships	Eindhoven, Netherlands	
100 m breaststroke	SB13	1:01.69	Taliso Engel	Germany	22 September 2025	World Para Championships	Singapore, Singapore	
100 m breaststroke	SB14	1:02.38	Naohide Yamaguchi	Japan	29 August 2026	-	Walnut, United States	

Legend: # – Record awaiting ratification by IPC; e – equalled existing record;
Records not set in finals: h – heat; sf – semifinal; r – relay 1st leg; rh – relay heat 1st leg; b – B final; † – en route to final mark; so – swim-off

== 200 m breaststroke ==
Event	Class	Time	Name	Nation	Date	Meet	Location	Ref
200 m breaststroke	SB4	3:21.36	Daniel de Faria Dias	Brazil	5 December 2014	-	Edmonton, Canada	
200 m breaststroke	SB5	3:08.48	Antoni Ponce Bertran	Spain	14 May 2023	International German Championships	Berlin, Germany	
200 m breaststroke	SB6	2:59.49	Morgan Ray	United States	15 December 2023	-	Orlando, United States	
200 m breaststroke	SB7	2:47.07	Blake Cochrane	Australia	16 April 2015	29th International German Championships	Berlin, Germany	
200 m breaststroke	SB8	2:25.83	Andriy Kalyna	Russia	9 June 2019	International German Championships	Berlin, Germany	
200 m breaststroke	SB9	2:22.27	Kevin Paul	South Africa	14 April 2015	South African Championships	Durban, South Africa	
200 m breaststroke	SB11	2:38.10	Rogier Dorsman	Netherlands	22 June 2019	-	Amersfoort, Netherlands	
200 m breaststroke	SB12	2:25.18	Artur Saifutdinov	Russia	20 June 2021	International German Championships	Berlin, Germany	
200 m breaststroke	SB13	2:23.43	Taliso Engel	Germany	22 June 2025	International German Championships	Berlin, Germany	
200 m breaststroke	SB14	2:18.27	Naohide Yamaguchi	Japan	29 August 2025	Virtus World Swimming Championships	Bangkok, Thailand	

Legend: # – Record awaiting ratification by IPC; e – equalled existing record;
Records not set in finals: h – heat; sf – semifinal; r – relay 1st leg; rh – relay heat 1st leg; b – B final; † – en route to final mark; so – swim-off

== 50 m butterfly ==
Event	Class	Time		Name	Nation	Date	Meet	Location	Ref
50 m butterfly	S1	1:58.14		David Lega	Sweden	15 March 1997	-	Turku, Finland	
50 m butterfly	S2	52.37		Gabriel Araujo	Brazil	2 June 2024	International German Championships	Berlin, Germany	
50 m butterfly	S3	46.99		Josia Topf	Germany	14 May 2023	International German Championships	Berlin, Germany	
50 m butterfly	S4	37.95		Sebastian Massabie	Canada	29 November 2024	-	Markham, Canada	
50 m butterfly	S5	30.28		Guo Jincheng	China	6 September 2024	Paralympic Games	Paris, France	
50 m butterfly	S6	29.89		Xu Qing	China	9 September 2016	Paralympic Games	Rio de Janeiro, Brazil	
50 m butterfly	S7	28.41		Pan Shiyun	China	12 September 2016	Paralympic Games	Rio de Janeiro, Brazil	
50 m butterfly	S8	27.57		Michal Golus	Poland	3 April 2022	-	Berlin, Germany	
50 m butterfly	S9	26.05		Simone Barlaam	Italy	11 March 2023	Citi Para Swimming World Series	Lignano Sabbiadoro, Italy	
50 m butterfly	S10	24.87		Stefano Raimondi	Italy	13 August 2020	-	Rome, Italy	
50m butterfly	S11	26.90		David Kratochvil	Czech Republic	26 April 2025	-	Prague, Czech Republic	
50 m butterfly	S12	25.24		Stephen Clegg	Great Britain	3 March 2018	-	Copenhagen, Denmark	
50 m butterfly	S13	24.53		Timothy Antalfy	Australia	17 March 2012	-	Adelaide, Australia	
50 m butterfly	S14	27.00	not ratified or later rescinded	Mitchell Kilduff	Australia	13 April 2016	Australian Championships	Adelaide, Australia	

Legend: # – Record awaiting ratification by IPC; e – equalled existing record;
Records not set in finals: h – heat; sf – semifinal; r – relay 1st leg; rh – relay heat 1st leg; b – B final; † – en route to final mark; so – swim-off

== 100 m butterfly ==
Event	Class	Time	Name	Nation	Date	Meet	Location	Ref
100 m butterfly	S5	1:16.44	Samuel Da Silva De Oliveira	Brazil	19 March 2023	-	Sheffield, United Kingdom	
100 m butterfly	S6	1:10.26	Sascha Kindred	Great Britain	16 April 2015	29th International German Championships	Berlin, Germany	
100 m butterfly	S7	1:05.48	Carlos Serrano Zárate	Colombia	11 May 2023	International German Championships	Berlin, Germany	
100 m butterfly	S8	59.19	Song Maodang	China	9 September 2016	Paralympic Games	Rio de Janeiro, Brazil	
100 m butterfly	S9	57.19	William Martin	Australia	2 September 2021	Paralympic Games	Tokyo, Japan	
100 m butterfly	S10	54.15	Maksym Krypak	Ukraine	31 August 2021	Paralympic Games	Tokyo, Japan	
100 m butterfly	S11	1:00.66	Danylo Chufarov	Ukraine	1 August 2023	-	Manchester, United Kingdom	
100 m butterfly	S12	56.47	Konstantin Burmistrov	Russia	13 March 2026	Para Swimming World Series	Lignano Sabbiadoro, Italy	
100 m butterfly	S13	53.72	Ihar Boki	Belarus	16 May 2021	European Open Championships	Funchal, Portugal	
100 m butterfly	S14	54.18	Gabriel Bandeira	Brazil	13 May 2022	Brazilian Para Swimming Championships	São Paulo, Brazil	

Legend: # – Record awaiting ratification by IPC; e – equalled existing record;
Records not set in finals: h – heat; sf – semifinal; r – relay 1st leg; rh – relay heat 1st leg; b – B final; † – en route to final mark; so – swim-off

== 200 m butterfly ==
Event	Class	Time		Name	Nation	Date	Meet	Location	Ref
200 m butterfly	S8	2:15.50	tt	Diogo Cancela	Portugal	6 April 2023	-	Eindhoven, Netherlands	
200 m butterfly	S9	2:09.68		Dimosthenis Michalentzakis	Greece	8 July 2017	31st International German Championships	Berlin, Germany	
200 m butterfly	S10	2:05.50		Koehn Boyd	United States	20 June 2025	-	Boise, United States	
200 m butterfly	S11	2:25.10		Keiichi Kimura	Japan	11 June 2016	30th International German Championships	Berlin, Germany	
200 m butterfly	S12	2:12.49		Roman Makarov	Russia	14 May 2015	-	Seoul, South Korea	
200 m butterfly	S13	2:04.06		Ihar Boki	Belarus	9 June 2018	International German Championships	Berlin, Germany	
200 m butterfly	S14	2:05.90		Alexander Hillhouse	Denmark	7 April 2025	-	Copenhagen, Denmark	

Legend: # – Record awaiting ratification by IPC; e – equalled existing record;
Records not set in finals: h – heat; sf – semifinal; r – relay 1st leg; rh – relay heat 1st leg; b – B final; † – en route to final mark; so – swim-off

== 150 m individual medley ==
Event	Class	Time		Name	Nation	Date	Meet	Location	Ref
150 m individual medley	SM1	4:52.88	h	Iyad Shalabi	Israel	28 August 2021	Paralympic Games	Tokyo, Japan	
150 m individual medley	SM2	3:14.02	not ratified or later rescinded	Gabriel Araújo	Brazil	1 September 2024	Paralympic Games	Paris, France	
150 m individual medley	SM2	3:16.26		Gabriel Araújo	Brazil	22 September 2025	World Para Championships	Singapore, Singapore	
150m individual medley	SM3	2:40.19		Huang Wenpan	China	16 September 2016	Paralympic Games	Rio de Janeiro, Brazil	
150m individual medley	SM4	2:20.86		Roman Zhdanov	Russia	23 September 2025	World Para Championships	Singapore, Singapore	

Legend: # – Record awaiting ratification by IPC; e – equalled existing record;
Records not set in finals: h – heat; sf – semifinal; r – relay 1st leg; rh – relay heat 1st leg; b – B final; † – en route to final mark; so – swim-off

== 200 m individual medley ==
Event	Class	Time		Name	Nation	Date	Meet	Location	Ref
200 m individual medley	SM3	4:05.19		Josia Topf	Germany	2 June 2024	International German Championships	Berlin, Germany	
200 m individual medley	SM4	3:33.01	b	Takayuki Suzuki	Japan	25 April 2014	International German Championships	Berlin, Germany	
200 m individual medley	SM5	2:46.55		Guo Jincheng	China	3 August 2023	World Para Championships	Manchester, United Kingdom	
200 m individual medley	SM6	2:36.73		Yang Hong	China	23 September 2025	World Para Championships	Singapore, Singapore	
200 m individual medley	SM7	2:28.19		Andrii Trusov	Ukraine	31 July 2023	World Para Championships	Manchester, United Kingdom	
200 m individual medley	SM8	2:20.01		Oliver Hynd	Great Britain	12 September 2016	Paralympic Games	Rio de Janeiro, Brazil	
200 m individual medley	SM9	2:12.03		Timothy Hodge	Australia	12 June 2024	Australian Trials	Brisbane, Australia	
200 m individual medley	SM10	2:05.63		Denys Dubrov	Ukraine	18 August 2018	European Championships	Dublin, Ireland	
200 m individual medley	SM11	2:18.01		Rogier Dorsman	Netherlands	24 April 2024	World Para European Open Championships	Funchal, Portugal	
200 m individual medley	SM12	2:10.87		Danylo Chufarov	Ukraine	14 August 2013	World Championships	Montreal, Canada	
200 m individual medley	SM13	2:02.03		Ihar Boki	Belarus	3 September 2024	Paralympic Games	Paris, France	
200 m individual medley	SM14	2:05.40		Gabriel Bandeira	Brazil	25 September 2025	World Para Championships	Singapore, Singapore	

Legend: # – Record awaiting ratification by IPC; e – equalled existing record;
Records not set in finals: h – heat; sf – semifinal; r – relay 1st leg; rh – relay heat 1st leg; b – B final; † – en route to final mark; so – swim-off

== 400 m individual medley ==
Event	Class	Time		Name	Nation	Date	Meet	Location	Ref
400 m individual medley	SM8	5:09.54		Robert Griswold	United States	11 May 2019	-	Cincinnati, United States	
400 m individual medley	SM9	4:50.14		Timothy Hodge	Australia	15 March 2020	-	Sydney, Australia	
400 m individual medley	SM10	4:45.83	h	Koehn Boyd	United States	20 June 2025	U.S. Paralympics Championships	Boise, United States	
400 m individual medley	SM11	5:04.31		John Morgan	United States	10 September 1992	Paralympic Games	Barcelona, Spain	
400 m individual medley	SM12	4:46.81		Enrique Floriano	Spain	28 April 2011	International German Championships	Berlin, Germany	
400 m individual medley	SM13	4:54.71		Sean Russo	Australia	16 April 2015	29th International German Championships	Berlin, Germany	
400 m individual medley	SM14	4:43.52		Chan Long Tin	Hong Kong	14 October 2019	-	Brisbane, Australia	

Legend: # – Record awaiting ratification by IPC; e – equalled existing record;
Records not set in finals: h – heat; sf – semifinal; r – relay 1st leg; rh – relay heat 1st leg; b – B final; † – en route to final mark; so – swim-off

== Freestyle relays ==
Event	Class	Time		Name	Nation	Date	Meet	Location	Ref
4×50 m freestyle relay	20 points	2:18.15		Du Jianping; Tang Yuan; He Junquan; Yang Yuanrun	China	11 September 2008	Paralympic Games	Beijing, China	
4×50 m freestyle relay	S11–13	1:49.15	not ratified or later rescinded	Chris Holmes; Tim Reddish; Darren Leach; Dervis Konuralp	Great Britain	20 July 1998	-	Madrid, Spain	
4 × 100 m freestyle relay	34 points	3:44.31		Rowan Crothers (S10) (51.35); Will Martin (S9) (54.53); Matt Levy (S7) (1:01.30); Ben Popham (S8) (57.13)	Australia	30 August 2021	Paralympic Games	Tokyo, Japan	
4 × 100 m freestyle relay	40 points	4:14.93		Paul Noble; Phillip Stedman; Gary Watson; David Moreton	Great Britain	24 Jul 1990	-	Drachten, Netherlands	
4 × 100 m freestyle relay	49 points	3:45.97		Dmytro Kuzmin; Sergiy Demchuk; Sergiy Klippert; Dmytro Aleksyeyev	Ukraine	23 Sep 2004	Paralympic Games	Athens, Greece	
4 × 100 m freestyle relay	56 points	3:54.42			Canada	7 August 2014	Para Pan Pacific Championships	Pasadena, United States	
4 × 100 m freestyle relay	S11–13	4:04.03		Chris Holmes; Tim Reddish; Darren Leach; Dervis Konuralp	Great Britain	25 Jul 1998	-	Madrid, Spain	

Legend: # – Record awaiting ratification by IPC; e – equalled existing record;
Records not set in finals: h – heat; sf – semifinal; b – B final; so – swim-off

== Medley relays ==
Event	Class	Time	Name	Nation	Date	Meet	Location	Ref
4×50 m medley relay	20 points	2:33.15	Du Jianping; Tang Yuan; Qing Xu; Yang Yuanrun	China	15 Sep 2008	Paralympic Games	Beijing, China	
4×50 m medley relay	S11–13	2:05.23	Dmytro Aleksyeyev; Ruslan Burlakov; Oleksandr Mashchenko; Sergiy Demchuk	Ukraine	28 Jun 2001	-	Ceske, Czech Republic	
4 × 100 m medley relay	34 points	4:06.09	Konstantin Lisenkov (1:05.93); Andrei Kalina (1:06.79); Dmitry Grigoryev (57.88); Denis Tarasov (55.49)	Russia	18 July 2015	World Championships	Glasgow, Great Britain	
4 × 100 m medley relay	49 points	4:02.14	Aleksandr Nevolin-Svetov; Mikhail Zimin; Roman Makarov; Sergey Punko	Russia	18 Aug 2010	World Championships	Eindhoven, Netherlands	
4 × 100 m medley relay	S11–13	4:31.26	Yoshikazu Sakai; Yasuharu Chujo; Junichi Kawai; Koshiro Sugita	Japan	28 October 2000	Paralympic Games	Sydney, Australia	

Legend: # – Record awaiting ratification by IPC; e – equalled existing record;
Records not set in finals: h – heat; sf – semifinal; b – B final; so – swim-off

== Mixed relays ==
Event	Class	Time		Name	Nation	Date	Meet	Location	Ref
4×50 m freestyle relay	20 points	2:18.03		Peng Qiuping (S3) (42.52); Jiang Shengnan (S8) (30.52); Huang Wenpan (S3) (36.64); Xu Qing (S6) (28.35)	China	9 September 2016	Paralympic Games	Rio de Janeiro, Brazil	
4 × 100 m freestyle relay	34 points	4:01.54		Stefano Raimondi (S10) (51.42); Giulia Terzi (S7) (1:10.97); Xenia Palazzo (S8) (1:07.29); Simone Barlaam (S9) (51.85)	Italy	7 September 2024	Paralympic Games	Paris, France	
4 × 100 m freestyle relay	49 points	3:51.85		Maryna Piddubna (S11); Iaroslav Denysenko (S12); Anna Stetsenko (S13); Kyrylo Garashchenko (S13)	Ukraine	14 September 2019	-	London, United Kingdom	
4 × 100 m freestyle relay	S14	3:40.63		Reece Dunn; Bethany Firth; Jessica-Jane Applegate; Jordan Catchpole	Great Britain	28 August 2021	Paralympic Games	Tokyo, Japan	
4×50 m medley relay	20 points	2:27.45		Yuan Weiyi (S5) (32.26); Cheng Jiao (SB4) (51.08); Jiang Yuyan (S6) (34.58); Guo Jincheng (S5) (29.53)	China	2 August 2023	World Para Championships	Manchester, United Kingdom	
4 × 100 m medley relay	49 points	4:25.78		Kateryna Tkachuk (S11) (1:19.96); Oleksii Fedyna (SB12) (1:07.63); Oleksii Virchenko (S13) (56.72); Anna Stetsenko (S12) (1:01.47)	Ukraine	3 August 2023	World Para Championships	Manchester, United Kingdom	
4 × 100 m medley relay	49 points	4:23.48	'#'	Carol Santiago (S12) (1:09.23); Guilherme Batista Silva (SB13) (1:10.53); Thomaz Rocha Matera (S11) (1:01.94); Lucilene Da Silva Sousa (S12) (1:01.78)	Brazil	24 September 2025	World Para Championships	Singapore, Singapore	
4 × 100 m medley relay	S14	4:07.71		Benjamin Hance (S14) (56.94); Jake Michel (SB14) (1:04.13); Paige Leonhardt (S14) (1:06.09); Madeleine McTernan (S14) (1:00.55)	Australia	6 August 2023	World Para Championships	Manchester, United Kingdom	

Legend: # – Record awaiting ratification by IPC; e – equalled existing record;
Records not set in finals: h – heat; so – swim-off; tt – time trial

== See also ==
- List of IPC world records in swimming – Women's long course
- List of IPC world records in swimming – Men's short course
- List of IPC world records in swimming – Women's short course
