= Swimming at the 2012 Summer Paralympics – Men's 50 metre freestyle S2 =

Event at the 2012 Summer Paralympics

Men's 50 metre freestyle S2 at the XIV Paralympic Games
- Venue: London Aquatics Centre
- Dates: 7 September 2012
- Competitors: 12 from 9 nations

Medalists
1st place, gold medalist(s)		Yang Yang	China
2nd place, silver medalist(s)		Dmitrii Kokarev	Russia
3rd place, bronze medalist(s)		Aristeidis Makrodimitris	Greece

The men's 50 metre freestyle S2 event at the 2012 Paralympic Games took place on 7 September, at the London Aquatics Centre.

Two heats were held, both with six swimmers. The swimmers with the eight fastest times advanced to the final.

== Heats ==
=== Heat 1 ===
Rank	Lane	Name	Nationality	Time	Notes
1	4	Aristeidis Makrodimitris	Greece	1:06.69	Q
2	3	Iad Josef Shalabi	Israel	1:07.52	Q
3	5	Jacek Czech	Poland	1:07.56	Q
4	6	Curtis Lovejoy	United States	1:10.44	Q
5	2	Francesco Bettella	Italy	1:13.86	
	7	Christos Tampaxis	Greece	DNS	

=== Heat 2 ===
Rank	Lane	Name	Nationality	Time	Notes
1	7	Yang Yang	China	1:01.05	Q
2	4	Dmitrii Kokarev	Russia	1:05.61	Q
3	6	Ievgen Panibratets	Ukraine	1:08.45	Q
4	5	Itzhak Mamistvalov	Israel	1:08.73	Q
5	2	Georgios Kapellakis	Greece	1:10.48	
6	3	James Anderson	Great Britain	1:10.61	

== Final ==
Rank	Lane	Name	Nationality	Time	Notes
1st place, gold medalist(s)	4	Yang Yang	China	1:01.39	
2nd place, silver medalist(s)	5	Dmitrii Kokarev	Russia	1:02.47	
3rd place, bronze medalist(s)	3	Aristeidis Makrodimitris	Greece	1:04.86	
4	2	Jacek Czech	Poland	1:06.41	
5	6	Iad Josef Shalabi	Israel	1:07.07	
6	1	Itzhak Mamistvalov	Israel	1:07.94	
7	7	Ievgen Panibratets	Ukraine	1:08.75	
8	8	Curtis Lovejoy	United States	1:13.45	
