= Swimming at the 2016 Summer Paralympics – Men's 100 metre backstroke =

The men's 100 m backstroke swimming events for the 2016 Summer Paralympics took place at the Olympic Aquatics Stadium from 8 to 17 September. A total of eleven events were contested for eleven different classifications.

== Competition format ==
Each event consists of two rounds: heats and final. The top eight swimmers overall in the heats progress to the final. If there are less than eight swimmers in an event, no heats are held and all swimmers qualify for the final.

== Results ==
=== S1 ===
The S1 event took place on 9 September.

Rank	Lane	Name	Nationality	Time	Notes
1st place, gold medalist(s)	4	Hennadii Boiko	Ukraine	2:08.01	WR
2nd place, silver medalist(s)	5	Francesco Bettella	Italy	2:27.06	
3rd place, bronze medalist(s)	3	Anton Kol	Ukraine	2:27.45	
4	6	Christos Tampaxis	Greece	2:45.23	
5	7	Oleksandr Golovko	Ukraine	3:03.83	
6	7	Dimitrios Karypidis	Greece	3:12.73	
7	1	Luis Rojas Osorno	Colombia	3:42.24	

=== S2 ===
The S2 event took place on 9 September.

Rank	Lane	Name	Nationality	Time	Notes
1st place, gold medalist(s)	3	Zou Liankang	China	1:45.25	WR
2nd place, silver medalist(s)	4	Liu Benying	China	1:48.2	
3rd place, bronze medalist(s)	5	Serhii Palamarchuk	Ukraine	1:49.76	
4	6	Yang Yang	China	2:00.06	
5	2	Ievgen Panibratets	Ukraine	2:07.00	
6	7	Roman Bondarenko	Ukraine	2:14.10	
7	8	Jacek Czech	Poland	2:17.08	
8	1	Aristeidis Makrodimitris	Greece	2:22.45	

=== S6 ===
The S6 event took place on 8 September.

Rank	Lane	Name	Nationality	Time	Notes
1st place, gold medalist(s)	5	Zheng Tao	China	1:10.84	WR
2nd place, silver medalist(s)	4	Jia Hongguang	China	1:13.42	
3rd place, bronze medalist(s)	3	Iaroslav Semenenko	Ukraine	1:15.41	
4	6	Talisson Glock	Brazil	1:15.97	
5	2	Oleksandr Komarov	Ukraine	1:19.64	
6	8	Luo Fangyu	China	1:20.54	
7	7	Thijs van Hofweegen	Netherlands	1:21.80	
8	1	Aung Myint Myat	Myanmar	1:24.23	

=== S7 ===
The S7 event took place on 8 September.

Rank	Lane	Name	Nationality	Time	Notes
1st place, gold medalist(s)	3	Ievgenii Bogodaiko	Ukraine	1:10.55	
2nd place, silver medalist(s)	4	Jonathan Fox	Great Britain	1:10.78	
3rd place, bronze medalist(s)	5	Ítalo Pereira	Brazil	1:12.48	
4	6	Marian Kvasnytsia	Ukraine	1:13.48	
5	2	Dino Sinovcic	Croatia	1:14.49	
6	1	Gao Nan	China	1:15.67	
7	7	Matias de Andrade	Argentina	1:16.43	
8	8	Guillermo Marro	Argentina	1:17.62	

=== S8 ===
19:21 13 September 2016:

Rank	Lane	Name	Nationality	Time	Notes
1st place, gold medalist(s)	7	Cong Zhou	China	1:02.90	WR
2nd place, silver medalist(s)	3	Oliver Hynd	Great Britain	1:04.46	
3rd place, bronze medalist(s)	4	Robert Griswold	United States	1:04.68	
4	5	Iurii Bozhynskyi	Ukraine	1:06.21	
5	6	Bohdan Hrynenko	Ukraine	1:06.24	
6	2	Pipo Carlomagno	Argentina	1:07.33	
7	1	Jesse Aungles	Australia	1:09.47	
8	8	Niels Mortensen	Denmark	1:09.62	

=== S9 ===
17:43 16 September 2016:

Rank	Lane	Name	Nationality	Time	Notes
1st place, gold medalist(s)	6	Tamás Tóth	Hungary	1:04.30	
2nd place, silver medalist(s)	3	Xiaobing Liu	China	1:04.46	
3rd place, bronze medalist(s)	2	Brenden Hall	Australia	1:04.67	
4	5	James Crisp	Great Britain	1:05.01	
5	4	Patryk Biskup	Poland	1:05.10	
6	7	Timothy Hodge	Australia	1:05.18	
7	1	Jesse Reynolds	New Zealand	1:05.57	
8	8	Logan Powell	Australia	1:06.13	

=== S10 ===
The S10 event took place on 10 September.

Rank	Lane	Name	Nationality	Time	Notes
1st place, gold medalist(s)	4	Maksym Krypak	Ukraine	57.24	WR
2nd place, silver medalist(s)	5	Olivier van de Voort	Netherlands	58.10	
3rd place, bronze medalist(s)	3	Denys Dubrov	Ukraine	59.37	
4	7	André Brasil	Brazil	59.55	
5	2	Benoit Huot	Canada	1:00.33	
6	6	Michael Anderson	Australia	1:01.37	
7	1	Alec Elliot	Canada	1:02.45	
8	8	Riccardo Manciotti	Italy	1:02.70	

=== S11 ===
The S11 event took place on 9 September.

Rank	Lane	Name	Nationality	Time	Notes
1st place, gold medalist(s)	2	Dmytro Zalevskyi	Ukraine	1:06.66	WR
2nd place, silver medalist(s)	4	Wojciech Makowski	Poland	1:08.28	
2nd place, silver medalist(s)	6	Bradley Snyder	United States	1:08.28	
4	7	Viktor Smyrnov	Ukraine	1:08.55	
5	5	Jeremy McClure	Australia	1:09.11	
6	3	Yang Bozun	China	1:09.89	
7	1	Lou Chenquan	China	1:12.20	
8	8	Oleksandr Mashchenko	Ukraine	1:15.85	

=== S12 ===
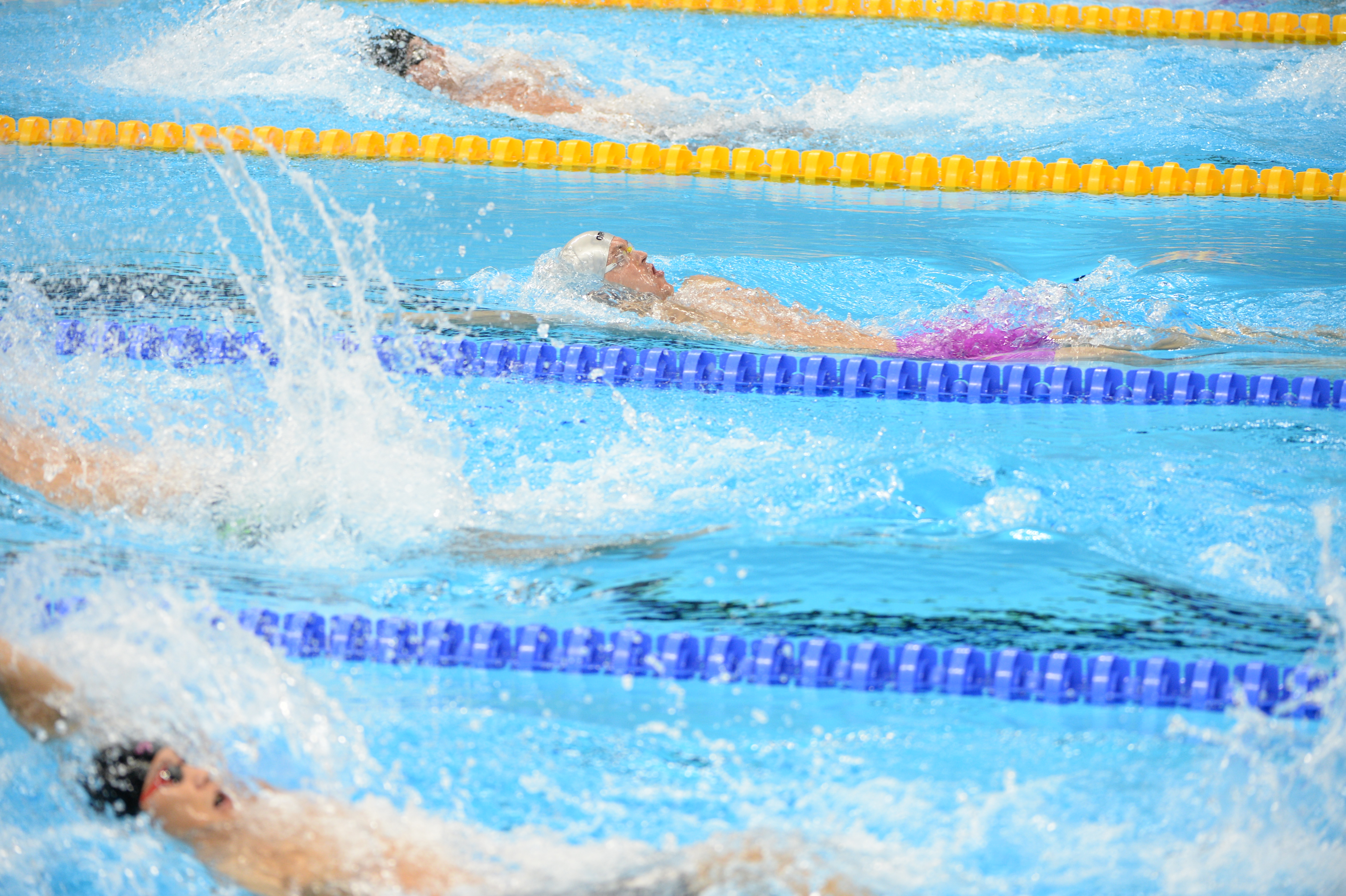
Men's 100 metre backstroke S12

18:34 14 September 2016:

Rank	Lane	Name	Nationality	Time	Notes
1st place, gold medalist(s)	3	Sergii Klippert	Ukraine	59.77	
2nd place, silver medalist(s)	4	Raman Salei	Azerbaijan	1:00.91	
3rd place, bronze medalist(s)	5	Tucker Dupree	United States	1:01.04	
4	7	Charalampos Taiganidis	Greece	1:01.21	
5	2	Stephen Clegg	Great Britain	1:02.06	
6	6	Dzmitry Salei	Azerbaijan	1:02.70	
7	1	Thomaz Matera	Brazil	1:04.33	
8	8	Anuar Akhmetov	Kazakhstan	1:09.11	

=== S13 ===
18:53 17 September 2016:

Rank	Lane	Name	Nationality	Time	Notes
1st place, gold medalist(s)	4	Ihar Boki	Belarus	56.68	WR
2nd place, silver medalist(s)	6	Iaroslav Denysenko	Ukraine	59.02	
3rd place, bronze medalist(s)	5	Nicolas Guy Turbide	Canada	59.55	
4	3	Kirill Pankov	Uzbekistan	1:00.44	
5	7	Sean Russo	Australia	1:01.43	
6	2	Antti Latikka	Finland	1:02.84	
7	1	Muzaffar Tursunkhujaev	Uzbekistan	1:03.80	
8	8	Devin Gotell	Canada	1:06.62	

=== S14 ===
The S14 event took place on 8 September.

Rank	Lane	Name	Nationality	Time	Notes
1st place, gold medalist(s)	4	Lee In Kook	South Korea	59.82	PR
2nd place, silver medalist(s)	5	Marc Evers	Netherlands	1:00.63	
3rd place, bronze medalist(s)	6	Takuya Tsugawa	Japan	1:03.42	
4	7	Tang Wai Lok	Hong Kong	1:03.88	
5	1	Gordie Michie	Canada	1:05.12	
6	3	Daniel Fox	Australia	1:05.16	
7	2	Cho Won Sang	South Korea	1:05.66	
8	8	Joshua Alford	Australia	1:07.77	
