= Swimming at the 2020 Summer Paralympics – Men's 50 metre backstroke S4 =

Men's 50 metre backstroke S4 at the XVI Paralympic Games
- Venue: Tokyo Aquatics Centre
- Dates: 3 September 2021
- Competitors: 15 from 12 nations
- Winning time: 40.99

Medalists
1st place, gold medalist(s)		Roman Zhdanov	RPC
2nd place, silver medalist(s)		Arnošt Petráček	Czech Republic
3rd place, bronze medalist(s)		Ángel de Jesús Camacho Ramírez	Mexico

The Men's 50 metre backstroke S4 event at the 2020 Paralympic Games took place on 3 September 2021, at the Tokyo Aquatics Centre.

== Heats ==
The swimmers with the top eight times, regardless of heat, advanced to the final.

Rank	Heat	Lane	Name	Nationality	Time	Notes
1	1	4	Arnošt Petráček	Czech Republic	41.75	Q, PR
2	2	4	Roman Zhdanov	RPC	41.77	Q
3	1	5	Ángel de Jesús Camacho Ramírez	Mexico	43.99	Q
4	2	3	Liu Benying	China	45.21	Q
5	1	3	Dmytro Vynohradets	Ukraine	46.05	Q
6	2	6	Ronystony Cordeiro da Silva	Brazil	46.58	Q
7	2	5	Matz Topkin	Estonia	47.12	Q
8	2	2	Xavier Torres	Spain	47.73	Q
9	1	6	Ami Omer Dadaon	Israel	48.28	
10	2	7	Miguel Luque	Spain	49.57	
11	1	1	Lyndon Longhorne	Great Britain	50.12	
12	1	7	Andreas Ernhofer	Austria	50.18	
13	1	2	Gustavo Sánchez Martínez	Mexico	50.69	
14	2	8	Jo Giseong	South Korea	53.48	
15	2	1	Ariel Malyar	Israel	58.81	

== Final ==
Rank	Lane	Name	Nationality	Time	Notes
1st place, gold medalist(s)	5	Roman Zhdanov	RPC	40.99	WR
2nd place, silver medalist(s)	4	Arnošt Petráček	Czech Republic	41.26	
3rd place, bronze medalist(s)	3	Ángel de Jesús Camacho Ramírez	Mexico	43.25	
4	2	Dmytro Vynohradets	Ukraine	44.91	
5	6	Liu Benying	China	45.21	
6	1	Matz Topkin	Estonia	45.42	
7	8	Xavier Torres	Spain	46.93	
8	7	Ronystony Cordeiro da Silva	Brazil	46.95	
