= Swimming at the 2012 Summer Paralympics – Men's 100 metre freestyle S2 =

Event at the 2012 Summer Paralympics

Men's 100 metre freestyle S2 at the XIV Paralympic Games
- Venue: London Aquatics Centre
- Dates: 3 September 2012
- Competitors: 12 from 9 nations

Medalists
1st place, gold medalist(s)		Yang Yang	China
2nd place, silver medalist(s)		Dmitrii Kokarev	Russia
3rd place, bronze medalist(s)		Aristeidis Makrodimitris	Greece

The men's 100 metre freestyle S2 event at the 2012 Paralympic Games took place on 3 September, at the London Aquatics Centre.

Two heats were held, both with six swimmers. The swimmers with the eight fastest times advanced to the final.

== Heats ==
=== Heat 1 ===
Rank	Lane	Name	Nationality	Time	Notes
1	4	Dmitrii Kokarev	Russia	2:18.30	Q
2	5	Itzhak Mamistvalov	Israel	2:26.55	Q
3	3	Jacek Czech	Poland	2:27.14	Q
4	2	Denys Zhumela	Ukraine	2:33.86	
5	6	Curtis Lovejoy	United States	2:37.15	
6	7	Ievgen Panibratets	Ukraine	2:38.48	

=== Heat 2 ===
Rank	Lane	Name	Nationality	Time	Notes
1	4	Yang Yang	China	2:10.47	Q, WR
2	5	Aristeidis Makrodimitris	Greece	2:21.99	Q
3	2	Iad Josef Shalabi	Israel	2:25.55	Q
4	3	James Anderson	Great Britain	2:27.43	Q
5	6	Francesco Bettella	Italy	2:29.34	Q
6	7	Georgios Kapellakis	Greece	2:46.18	

== Final ==
Rank	Lane	Name	Nationality	Time	Notes
1st place, gold medalist(s)	4	Yang Yang	China	2:03.71	WR
2nd place, silver medalist(s)	5	Dmitrii Kokarev	Russia	2:16.46	
3rd place, bronze medalist(s)	3	Aristeidis Makrodimitris	Greece	2:21.04	
4	7	Jacek Czech	Poland	2:22.84	
5	6	Iad Josef Shalabi	Israel	2:24.73	
6	2	Itzhak Mamistvalov	Israel	2:25.60	
7	8	Francesco Bettella	Italy	2:31.17	
8	1	James Anderson	Great Britain	2:31.33	
