= Swimming at the 2016 Summer Paralympics – Men's 100 metre backstroke S2 =

Men's 100 metre backstroke S2 at the XV Paralympic Games
- Venue: Olympic Aquatics Stadium
- Dates: 9 September 2016
- Competitors: 11 from 6 nations

Medalists
1st place, gold medalist(s)		Liankang Zou	China
2nd place, silver medalist(s)		Benying Liu	China
3rd place, bronze medalist(s)		Serhii Palamarchuk	Ukraine

The Men's 100 metre backstroke S2 event at the 2016 Paralympic Games took place on 9 September 2016, at the Olympic Aquatics Stadium. Two heats were held. The swimmers with the eight fastest times advanced to the final.

== Heats ==
=== Heat 1 ===
9:30 9 September 2016:

Rank	Lane	Name	Nationality	Time	Notes
1	4	Liankang Zou	China	1:58.29	WR Q
2	6	Ievgen Panibratets	Ukraine	2:10.47	Q
3	3	Aristeidis Makrodimitris	Greece	2:19.25	Q
4	5	Jacek Czech	Poland	2:24.83	Q
5	2	Octavian Ilina	Romania	2:49.34	

=== Heat 2 ===
9:36 9 September 2016:

Rank	Lane	Name	Nationality	Time	Notes
1	3	Benying Liu	China	1:50.67	WR Q
2	5	Serhii Palamarchuk	Ukraine	1:51.23	Q
3	4	Yang Yang	China	2:02.34	Q
4	6	Roman Bondarenko	Ukraine	2:14.94	Q
5	7	Georgios Kapellakis	Greece	2:45.85	
	2	Iad Joseph Shalabi	Israel		DSQ

== Final ==
17:40 9 September 2016:

Rank	Lane	Name	Nationality	Time	Notes
1st place, gold medalist(s)	3	Liankang Zou	China	1:45.25	WR
2nd place, silver medalist(s)	4	Benying Liu	China	1:48.29	
3rd place, bronze medalist(s)	5	Serhii Palamarchuk	Ukraine	1:49.76	
4	6	Yang Yang	China	2:00.06	
5	2	Ievgen Panibratets	Ukraine	2:07.00	
6	7	Roman Bondarenko	Ukraine	2:14.10	
7	8	Jacek Czech	Poland	2:17.08	
8	1	Aristeidis Makrodimitris	Greece	2:22.45	
