= Swimming at the 2012 Summer Paralympics – Men's 50 metre backstroke S2 =

Event at the 2012 Summer Paralympics

Men's 50 metre backstroke S2 at the XIV Paralympic Games
- Venue: London Aquatics Centre
- Dates: 5 September 2012
- Competitors: 10 from 9 nations

Medalists
1st place, gold medalist(s)		Yang Yang	China
2nd place, silver medalist(s)		Aristeidis Makrodimitris	Greece
3rd place, bronze medalist(s)		Dmitrii Kokarev	Russia

The men's 50 metre backstroke S2 event at the 2012 Paralympic Games took place on 5 September, at the London Aquatics Centre.

Two heats were held, both with five swimmers. The swimmers with the eight fastest times advanced to the final.

== Heats ==
=== Heat 1 ===
Rank	Lane	Name	Nationality	Time	Notes
1	2	Yang Yang	China	1:01.35	Q, WR
2	4	Aristeidis Makrodimitris	Greece	1:07.14	Q
3	3	Iad Josef Shalabi	Israel	1:08.37	Q
4	5	Jacek Czech	Poland	1:09.31	Q
5	6	Georgios Kapellakis	Greece	1:11.80	Q

=== Heat 2 ===
Rank	Lane	Name	Nationality	Time	Notes
1	5	James Anderson	Great Britain	1:07.17	Q
2	3	Ievgen Panibratets	Ukraine	1:07.33	Q
3	4	Dmitrii Kokarev	Russia	1:10.93	Q
4	6	Francesco Bettella	Italy	1:13.76	
5	2	Curtis Lovejoy	United States	1:16.06	

== Final ==
Rank	Lane	Name	Nationality	Time	Notes
1st place, gold medalist(s)	4	Yang Yang	China	1:00.90	WR
2nd place, silver medalist(s)	5	Aristeidis Makrodimitris	Greece	1:04.71	
3rd place, bronze medalist(s)	1	Dmitrii Kokarev	Russia	1:05.70	
4	3	James Anderson	Great Britain	1:07.30	
5	7	Jacek Czech	Poland	1:07.74	
6	2	Iad Josef Shalabi	Israel	1:08.97	
7	8	Georgios Kapellakis	Greece	1:10.73	
8	6	Ievgen Panibratets	Ukraine	1:11.03	
