= Swimming at the 2016 Summer Paralympics – Men's 200 metre freestyle S2 =

Men's 200 metre freestyle S2 at the XV Paralympic Games
- Venue: Olympic Aquatics Stadium
- Dates: 11 September 2016
- Competitors: 9 from 5 nations

Medalists
1st place, gold medalist(s)		Benying Liu	China
2nd place, silver medalist(s)		Liankang Zou	China
3rd place, bronze medalist(s)		Serhii Palamarchuk	Ukraine

The Men's 200 metre freestyle S2 event at the 2016 Paralympic Games took place on 11 September 2016, at the Olympic Aquatics Stadium. Two heats were held. The swimmers with the eight fastest times advanced to the final.

== Heats ==
=== Heat 1 ===
11:39 11 September 2016:

Rank	Lane	Name	Nationality	Time	Notes
1	5	Liankang Zou	China	3:49.37	WR Q
2	4	Serhii Palamarchuk	Ukraine	3:49.84	Q
3	6	Roman Bondarenko	Ukraine	4:38.94	Q
4	3	Aristeidis Makrodimitris	Greece	5:03.56	Q
5	2	Itzhak Mamistvalov	Israel	5:20.43	Q

=== Heat 2 ===
11:48 11 September 2016:

Rank	Lane	Name	Nationality	Time	Notes
1	5	Benying Liu	China	4:00.02	Q
2	4	Yang Yang	China	4:13.42	Q
3	2	Iad Joseph Shalabi	Israel	5:24.07	Q
4	7	Octavian Ilina	Romania	5:44.10	

== Final ==
20:26 11 September 2016:

Rank	Lane	Name	Nationality	Time	Notes
1st place, gold medalist(s)	3	Benying Liu	China	3:41.54	WR
2nd place, silver medalist(s)	4	Liankang Zou	China	3:42.58	
3rd place, bronze medalist(s)	5	Serhii Palamarchuk	Ukraine	3:43.69	
4	6	Yang Yang	China	4:11.20	
5	2	Roman Bondarenko	Ukraine	4:29.80	
6	7	Aristeidis Makrodimitris	Greece	4:57.90	
7	1	Itzhak Mamistvalov	Israel	5:09.96	
8	8	Iad Joseph Shalabi	Israel	5:22.38	
