= Swimming at the 2004 Summer Paralympics – Men's 200 metre freestyle S2 =

Men's 200m Freestyle S2 at the XII Paralympic Games
- Paralympic Swimming
- Venue: Olympic Aquatic Centre
- Dates: 22 September 2004
- Competitors: 10 from 9 nations
- Winning time: 4:49.81

Medalists
1st place, gold medalist(s)		James Anderson	Great Britain
2nd place, silver medalist(s)		Izhak Mamistvalov	Israel
3rd place, bronze medalist(s)		Philippe Révillon	France

The Men's 200 metre freestyle S2 swimming event at the 2004 Summer Paralympics was competed on 22 September. It was won by James Anderson, representing Great Britain.

== 1st round ==
Qualified for final round

Heat 1

22 Sept. 2004, morning session

Rank	Athlete	Time	Notes
1	Christian Goldbach (GER)	5:35.21	PR
2	Izhak Mamistvalov (ISR)	5:37.43	
3	Antonios Kymoundris (GRE)	5:43.88	
4	Pekka Kantola (FIN)	5:48.30	
5	Vojtech Franek (CZE)	6:22.01	

Heat 2

22 Sept. 2004, morning session

Rank	Athlete	Time	Notes
1	James Anderson (GBR)	5:21.39	PR
2	Philippe Révillon (FRA)	5:33.41	
3	Denys Zhumela (UKR)	5:34.99	
4	Georgios Kapellakis (GRE)	5:55.40	
5	Adriano Pereira (BRA)	5:57.00	

== Final round ==
22 Sept. 2004, evening session

Rank	Athlete	Time	Notes
1st place, gold medalist(s)	James Anderson (GBR)	4:49.81	WR
2nd place, silver medalist(s)	Izhak Mamistvalov (ISR)	5:07.44	
3rd place, bronze medalist(s)	Philippe Révillon (FRA)	5:23.63	
4	Christian Goldbach (GER)	5:28.96	
5	Denys Zhumela (UKR)	5:33.02	
6	Pekka Kantola (FIN)	5:39.52	
7	Antonios Kymoundris (GRE)	5:42.32	
8	Georgios Kapellakis (GRE)	5:49.36	
