= Swimming at the 2004 Summer Paralympics – Men's 50 metre freestyle S1 =

Men's 50m Freestyle S1 at the XII Paralympic Games
- Paralympic Swimming
- Venue: Olympic Aquatic Centre
- Dates: 24 September 2004
- Competitors: 7 from 6 nations
- Winning time: 1:10.88

Medalists
| 1st place, gold medalist(s) | | Izhak Mamistvalov | Israel |
| 2nd place, silver medalist(s) | | Christos Tampaxis | Greece |
| 3rd place, bronze medalist(s) | | João Martins | Portugal |

The Men's 50 metre freestyle S1 swimming event at the 2004 Summer Paralympics was competed on 24 September. It was won by Izhak Mamistvalov, representing Israel.

== Final round ==
24 Sept. 2004, evening session

| Rank | Athlete | Time | Notes |
|---|---|---|---|
| 1st place, gold medalist(s) | Izhak Mamistvalov (ISR) | 1:10.88 | PR |
| 2nd place, silver medalist(s) | Christos Tampaxis (GRE) | 1:31.00 | |
| 3rd place, bronze medalist(s) | João Martins (POR) | 1:37.83 | |
| 4 | Jiri Kaderavek (CZE) | 1:54.32 | |
| 5 | Alexandros Taxildaris (GRE) | 1:55.91 | |
| 6 | Grover Evans (USA) | 2:17.11 | |
| 7 | Mateo Micic (ARG) | 2:34.93 | |
