= Swimming at the 2016 Summer Paralympics – Men's 50 metre backstroke S2 =

Men's 50 metre backstroke S2 at the XV Paralympic Games
- Venue: Olympic Aquatics Stadium
- Dates: 15 September 2016
- Competitors: 11 from 6 nations

Medalists
1st place, gold medalist(s)		Liankang Zou	China
2nd place, silver medalist(s)		Benying Liu	China
3rd place, bronze medalist(s)		Serhii Palamarchuk	Ukraine

The Men's 50 metre backstroke S2 event at the 2016 Paralympic Games took place on 15 September 2016, at the Olympic Aquatics Stadium. Two heats were held. The swimmers with the eight fastest times advanced to the final.

== Heats ==
=== Heat 1 ===
11:06 15 September 2016:

Rank	Lane	Name	Nationality	Time	Notes
1	4	Yang Yang	China	58.63	Q
2	6	Roman Bondarenko	Ukraine	1:01.24	Q
3	5	Jacek Czech	Poland	1:02.28	Q
4	3	Ievgen Panibratets	Ukraine	1:03.18	Q
5	2	Iad Joseph Shalabi	Israel	1:16.97	

=== Heat 2 ===
11:11 15 September 2016:

Rank	Lane	Name	Nationality	Time	Notes
1	3	Benying Liu	China	52.14	Q
2	4	Liankang Zou	China	54.36	Q
3	5	Serhii Palamarchuk	Ukraine	57.98	Q
4	6	Aristeidis Makrodimitris	Greece	1:02.29	Q
5	7	Octavian Ilina	Romania	1:13.81	
6	2	Georgios Kapellakis	Greece	1:14.47	

== Final ==
19:44 15 September 2016:

Rank	Lane	Name	Nationality	Time	Notes
1st place, gold medalist(s)	5	Liankang Zou	China	47.17	WR
2nd place, silver medalist(s)	4	Benying Liu	China	48.84	
3rd place, bronze medalist(s)	3	Serhii Palamarchuk	Ukraine	50.23	
4	6	Yang Yang	China	57.27	
5	8	Ievgen Panibratets	Ukraine	1:00.03	
6	7	Jacek Czech	Poland	1:01.91	
7	1	Aristeidis Makrodimitris	Greece	1:03.46	
8	2	Roman Bondarenko	Ukraine	1:03.89	
