= Swimming at the 2016 Summer Paralympics – Men's 100 metre backstroke S8 =

Men's 100 metre backstroke S8 at the XV Paralympic Games
- Venue: Olympic Aquatics Stadium
- Dates: 13 September 2016
- Competitors: 9 from 8 nations

Medalists
1st place, gold medalist(s)		Cong Zhou	China
2nd place, silver medalist(s)		Oliver Hynd	Great Britain
3rd place, bronze medalist(s)		Robert Griswold	United States

The Men's 100 metre backstroke S8 event at the 2016 Paralympic Games took place on 13 September 2016, at the Olympic Aquatics Stadium. Two heats were held. The swimmers with the eight fastest times advanced to the final.

== Heats ==
=== Heat 1 ===
11:04 13 September 2016:

Rank	Lane	Name	Nationality	Time	Notes
1	4	Robert Griswold	United States	1:05.33	PR Q
2	5	Iurii Bozhynskyi	Ukraine	1:05.94	Q
3	3	Bohdan Hrynenko	Ukraine	1:06.73	Q
4	6	Niels Mortensen	Denmark	1:10.41	Q

=== Heat 2 ===
11:08 13 September 2016:

Rank	Lane	Name	Nationality	Time	Notes
1	5	Oliver Hynd	Great Britain	1:06.12	Q
2	6	Pipo Carlomagno	Argentina	1:07.70	Q
3	4	Cong Zhou	China	1:07.72	Q
4	3	Jesse Aungles	Australia	1:10.39	Q
5	2	Ernie Gawilan	Philippines	1:19.75	

== Final ==
19:21 13 September 2016:

Rank	Lane	Name	Nationality	Time	Notes
1st place, gold medalist(s)	7	Cong Zhou	China	1:02.90	WR
2nd place, silver medalist(s)	3	Oliver Hynd	Great Britain	1:04.46	
3rd place, bronze medalist(s)	4	Robert Griswold	United States	1:04.68	
4	5	Iurii Bozhynskyi	Ukraine	1:06.21	
5	6	Bohdan Hrynenko	Ukraine	1:06.24	
6	2	Pipo Carlomagno	Argentina	1:07.33	
7	1	Jesse Aungles	Australia	1:09.47	
8	8	Niels Mortensen	Denmark	1:09.62	
