= Swimming at the 2004 Summer Paralympics – Men's 100 metre freestyle S1 =

Men's 100m Freestyle S1 at the XII Paralympic Games
- Paralympic Swimming
- Venue: Olympic Aquatic Centre
- Dates: 21 September 2004
- Competitors: 6 from 5 nations
- Winning time: 2:35.24

Medalists
1st place, gold medalist(s)		Izhak Mamistvalov	Israel
2nd place, silver medalist(s)		Christos Tampaxis	Greece
3rd place, bronze medalist(s)		Jiri Kaderavek	Czech Republic

The Men's 100 metre freestyle S1 swimming event at the 2004 Summer Paralympics was competed on 21 September. It was won by Izhak Mamistvalov, representing Israel.

== Final round ==
21 Sept. 2004, evening session

Rank	Athlete	Time	Notes
1st place, gold medalist(s)	Izhak Mamistvalov (ISR)	2:35.24	PR
2nd place, silver medalist(s)	Christos Tampaxis (GRE)	2:56.64	
3rd place, bronze medalist(s)	Jiri Kaderavek (CZE)	3:40.46	
4	Alexandros Taxildaris (GRE)	3:48.41	
5	Grover Evans (USA)	3:57.78	
6	João Martins (POR)	4:13.61	
