= Kocaali (disambiguation) =

Kocaali can refer to the following places in Turkey:

- Kocaali, a municipality and district in Sakarya Province
- Kocaali, Enez, a village in Edirne Province
- Kocaali, Ergani, a neighbourhood in Diyarbakır Province

== See also ==
- Kocaeli (disambiguation)
