= Swimming at the 2004 Summer Paralympics – Men's 100 metre freestyle S2 =

Men's 100m Freestyle S2 at the XII Paralympic Games
- Paralympic Swimming
- Venue: Olympic Aquatic Centre
- Dates: 21 September 2004
- Competitors: 12 from 10 nations
- Winning time: 2:21.49

Medalists
1st place, gold medalist(s)		James Anderson	Great Britain
2nd place, silver medalist(s)		Curtis Lovejoy	United States
3rd place, bronze medalist(s)		Philippe Révillon	France

The Men's 100 metre freestyle S2 swimming event at the 2004 Summer Paralympics was competed on 21 September. It was won by James Anderson, representing Great Britain.

== 1st round ==
Qualified for final round

Heat 1

21 Sept. 2004, morning session

Rank	Athlete	Time	Notes
1	Curtis Lovejoy (USA)	2:28.69	
2	Denys Zhumela (UKR)	2:40.48	
3	Pekka Kantola (FIN)	2:43.91	
4	Miroslaw Piesak (POL)	2:48.05	
5	Georgios Kapellakis (GRE)	2:52.56	
6	Nikolaos Kaplanis (GRE)	3:16.24	

Heat 2

21 Sept. 2004, morning session

Rank	Athlete	Time	Notes
1	James Anderson (GBR)	2:21.67	
2	Philippe Révillon (FRA)	2:36.26	
3	Christian Goldbach (GER)	2:40.00	
4	Vojtech Franek (CZE)	2:52.46	
5	Adriano Pereira (BRA)	2:59.86	
6	Antonios Kymoundris (GRE)	3:00.09	

== Final round ==
21 Sept. 2004, evening session

Rank	Athlete	Time	Notes
1st place, gold medalist(s)	James Anderson (GBR)	2:21.49	
2nd place, silver medalist(s)	Curtis Lovejoy (USA)	2:27.46	
3rd place, bronze medalist(s)	Philippe Révillon (FRA)	2:29.07	
4	Denys Zhumela (UKR)	2:39.80	
5	Miroslaw Piesak (POL)	2:40.65	
6	Christian Goldbach (GER)	2:40.83	
7	Pekka Kantola (FIN)	2:46.07	
8	Vojtech Franek (CZE)	2:50.16	
