= Philippe Révillon =

French swimmer

Medal record

Men's para swimming (S2)

Representing France

Paralympic Games
Silver medal – second place	2004 Athens	50 m freestyle S2
Bronze medal – third place	2000 Sydney	100 m freestyle S2
Bronze medal – third place	2004 Athens	100 m freestyle S2
Bronze medal – third place	2004 Athens	200 m freestyle

Philippe Révillon (born 1970 or 1971 in Angers) is a French swimmer.

Representing France at the Paralympic Games, and competing in S2 category for athletes with severe disabilities, he won a bronze medal in the men's 100 metre freestyle in 2000, followed by two bronzes (100 m freestyle, 200 m freestyle) and a silver (50 m freestyle) in 2004.

Révillon works as a banker.
