= Swimming at the 2004 Summer Paralympics – Men's 50 metre freestyle S2 =

Men's 50m Freestyle S2 at the XII Paralympic Games
- Paralympic Swimming
- Venue: Olympic Aquatic Centre
- Dates: 25 September 2004
- Competitors: 12 from 10 nations
- Winning time: 1:06.87

Medalists
| 1st place, gold medalist(s) | | James Anderson | Great Britain |
| 2nd place, silver medalist(s) | | Philippe Révillon | France |
| 3rd place, bronze medalist(s) | | Curtis Lovejoy | United States |

The Men's 50 metre freestyle S2 swimming event at the 2004 Summer Paralympics was competed on 25 September. It was won by James Anderson, representing Great Britain.

== 1st round ==
| Qualified for final round |

Heat 1

25 September 2004, morning session

| Rank | Athlete | Time | Notes |
|---|---|---|---|
| 1 | James Anderson (GBR) | 1:09.06 | |
| 2 | Miroslaw Piesak (POL) | 1:11.46 | |
| 3 | Georgios Kapellakis (GRE) | 1:14.28 | |
| 4 | Pekka Kantola (FIN) | 1:16.88 | |
| 5 | Vojtech Franek (CZE) | 1:17.51 | |
| 6 | Nikolaos Kaplanis (GRE) | 1:22.69 | |

Heat 2

25 September 2004, morning session

| Rank | Athlete | Time | Notes |
|---|---|---|---|
| 1 | Philippe Révillon (FRA) | 1:09.46 | |
| 2 | Curtis Lovejoy (USA) | 1:09.75 | |
| 3 | Denys Zhumela (UKR) | 1:17.69 | |
| 4 | Christian Goldbach (GER) | 1:20.04 | |
| 5 | Adriano Pereira (BRA) | 1:22.68 | |
| 6 | Antonios Kymoundris (GRE) | 1:26.28 | |

== Final round ==
25 September 2004, evening session

| Rank | Athlete | Time | Notes |
|---|---|---|---|
| 1st place, gold medalist(s) | James Anderson (GBR) | 1:06.87 | |
| 2nd place, silver medalist(s) | Philippe Révillon (FRA) | 1:09.18 | |
| 3rd place, bronze medalist(s) | Curtis Lovejoy (USA) | 1:09.86 | |
| 4 | Miroslaw Piesak (POL) | 1:10.52 | |
| 5 | Georgios Kapellakis (GRE) | 1:14.41 | |
| 6 | Pekka Kantola (FIN) | 1:15.36 | |
| 7 | Denys Zhumela (UKR) | 1:17.31 | |
| 8 | Vojtech Franek (CZE) | 1:19.79 | |
