= Swimming at the 2012 Summer Paralympics – Men's 200 metre freestyle S2 =

Event at the 2012 Summer Paralympics

Men's 200 metre freestyle S2 at the XIV Paralympic Games
- Venue: London Aquatics Centre
- Dates: 1 September 2012
- Competitors: 8 from 7 nations

Medalists
1st place, gold medalist(s)		Yang Yang	China
2nd place, silver medalist(s)		Dmitrii Kokarev	Russia
3rd place, bronze medalist(s)		Itzhak Mamistvalov	Israel

The men's 200 metre freestyle S2 event at the 2012 Paralympic Games took place on 1 September, at the London Aquatics Centre.

Eight swimmers advanced to the final.

== Final ==
Rank	Lane	Name	Nationality	Time	Notes
1st place, gold medalist(s)	5	Yang Yang	China	4:36.18	PR
2nd place, silver medalist(s)	4	Dmitrii Kokarev	Russia	4:39.23	
3rd place, bronze medalist(s)	6	Itzhak Mamistvalov	Israel	4:58.53	
4	2	Iad Josef Shalabi	Israel	4:58.54	
5	7	Francesco Bettella	Italy	5:02.96	
6	3	Aristeidis Makrodimitris	Greece	5:13.86	
7	8	Denys Zhumela	Ukraine	5:26.76	
8	1	Curtis Lovejoy	United States	5:47.15	
