= Serhii Palamarchuk =

Ukrainian paralympic swimmer

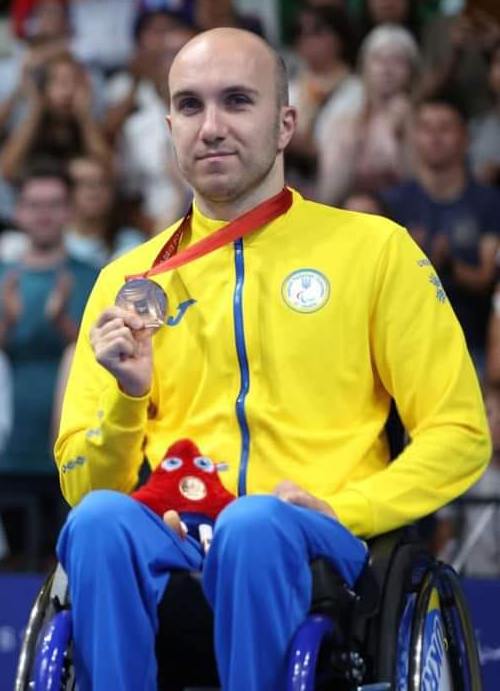
- Palamarchuk at the 2024 Summer Paralympics

Personal information
- Born: March 4, 1989 (age 37)

Sport
- Country: Ukraine
- Sport: Swimming
Medal record
Representing Ukraine
Men's para swimming
Paralympic Games
Bronze medal – third place	2016 Rio de Janeiro	200 m freestyle S2
Bronze medal – third place	2016 Rio de Janeiro	50 m backstroke S2
Bronze medal – third place	2016 Rio de Janeiro	100 m backstroke S2
Bronze medal – third place	2024 Paris	200 m freestyle S3
Bronze medal – third place	2024 Paris	50 m backstroke S3
World Championships
Bronze medal – third place	2023 Manchester	50 m freestyle S3
Bronze medal – third place	2025 Singapore	50 m backstroke S3
European Championships
Silver medal – second place	2026 Kocaeli	50 m freestyle S3

Serhii Palamarchuk (Ukrainian: Сергій Павлович Паламарчук, born 4 March 1989) is a Ukrainian Paralympic swimmer.

== Career ==
Palamarchuk competed at the 2016 Summer Paralympics in the swimming competition, winning bronze medals in the men's 200 metre freestyle S2, men's 50 metre backstroke S2 and the men's 100 metre backstroke S2 events. Palamarchuk competed at the 2024 Summer Paralympics in the swimming competition, winning bronze medals in the men's 200 metre freestyle S2 and men's 50 metre backstroke S2 events.
