= Kocaeli =

Kocaeli may refer to:

- Sanjak of Kocaeli, an Ottoman province
- Kocaeli Province, Turkey
- Kocaeli, an alternative name for İzmit
- Kocaeli Peninsula, the peninsula at the north west point of Anatolia
- Kocaeli, İvrindi, a village
