= Christos Tampaxis =

Greek Paralympic swimmer (born 1977)

Personal information
- Born: 26 June 1977 (age 49)
Medal record
Men's para swimming
Representing Greece
Paralympic Games
Gold medal – first place	2004 Athens	50 m backstroke S1
Gold medal – first place	2008 Beijing	50 m backstroke S1
Silver medal – second place	2004 Athens	100 m freestyle S1
Silver medal – second place	2004 Athens	50 m freestyle S1
Silver medal – second place	2012 London	50 m backstroke S1
World Championships
Bronze medal – third place	2015 Glasgow	100 m backstroke S1
Bronze medal – third place	2015 Glasgow	50 m backstroke S1
European Championships
Gold medal – first place	2009 Reykjavik	50 m backstroke S1
Silver medal – second place	2009 Reykjavik	50 m freestyle S1
Bronze medal – third place	2014 Eindhoven	50 m backstroke S1

Christos Tampaxis (born 26 June 1977) is a Greek swimmer.

He has represented Greece at the Paralympic Games on six occasions, in 1996, 2000, 2004, 2008, 2012 and 2016 . His first medals came at the 2004 Games. Competing in the S1 category for athletes with the most severe disabilities, Tampaxis won gold in the 50 metre backstroke, and silver in the 50 m and 100 m freestyle. His gold medal in the backstroke was also a Paralympic record: 1:22.20.

He successfully defended his 50-metre backstroke title at the 2008 Games, winning gold with a lead of more than twenty-one seconds over his countryman Andreas Katsaros, but failing to beat his own record; he swam the race in 1:23.15. The 50 metre backstroke was the only S1 event retained at the Beijing Games; Tampaxis therefore had to compete against S2 athletes (with slightly lesser levels of disability) in the freestyle (50m and 100m). He failed to advance from the heats.

Tampaxis is blind, and has no leg movement.

He was awarded as the Best Greek male athlete with a disability for 2009.
