= Zhou Cong =

Chinese Paralympic swimmer

Personal information
- Nationality: Chinese
- Born: February 1, 1989 (age 37)

Sport
- Sport: Swimming
Medal record
Representing China
Men's Paralympic swimming
Summer Paralympics
Gold medal – first place	2016 Rio de Janeiro	Men's 100 metre backstroke S8
Gold medal – first place	2016 Rio de Janeiro	Men's 4 × 100m Medley Relay - 34 Points

Zhou Cong (born February 1, 1989) is a Chinese swimmer. He won a gold medal at the Men's 100 metre backstroke S8 event at the 2016 Summer Paralympics with a world record and paralympic record of 1:02.90. He also won another gold medal at the Men's 4 × 100m Medley Relay - 34 Points event, with a personal time of 1:03.08 and a total team time of 4:06.44, a paralympic record.
