= Jim Anderson (swimmer) =

Scottish swimmer

Jim Anderson OBE
Personal information
- Full name: James Allan Anderson
- Nickname: Jim the Swim
- Nationality: United Kingdom; Scotland
- Born: 14 April 1963 (age 63) St Andrews, Fife

Sport
- Sport: Swimming
- Strokes: Freestyle, Backstroke
- Club: Broxburn ASC
Medal record
Men's para swimming
Representing Great Britain
Paralympic Games
Gold medal – first place	1996 Atlanta	50 m backstroke S2
Gold medal – first place	1996 Atlanta	100 m freestyle S2
Gold medal – first place	2004 Athens	50 m backstroke S2
Gold medal – first place	2004 Athens	50 m freestyle S2
Gold medal – first place	2004 Athens	100 m freestyle S2
Gold medal – first place	2004 Athens	200 m freestyle S2
Silver medal – second place	1992 Barcelona	50 m backstroke S2
Silver medal – second place	1992 Barcelona	50 m freestyle S2
Silver medal – second place	1992 Barcelona	100 m freestyle S2
Silver medal – second place	1996 Atlanta	50 m freestyle S2
Silver medal – second place	2000 Sydney	50 m backstroke S2
Silver medal – second place	2000 Sydney	50 m freestyle S2
Silver medal – second place	2000 Sydney	100 m freestyle S2
Silver medal – second place	2008 Beijing	50 m backstroke S2
Silver medal – second place	2008 Beijing	200 m freestyle S2
Bronze medal – third place	2008 Beijing	50 m freestyle S2
Bronze medal – third place	2008 Beijing	100 m freestyle S2
World Championships
Gold medal – first place	1994 Malta	50 m freestyle S2
Gold medal – first place	1994 Malta	100 m freestyle S2
Gold medal – first place	1998 New Zealand	50 m backstroke S2
Gold medal – first place	1998 New Zealand	100 m freestyle S2
Gold medal – first place	1998 New Zealand	200 m freestyle S2
Gold medal – first place	2002 Argentina	50 m backstroke S2
Gold medal – first place	2002 Argentina	100 m freestyle S2
Gold medal – first place	2002 Argentina	200 m freestyle S2
Gold medal – first place	2006 South Africa	50 m freestyle S2
Silver medal – second place	1998 New Zealand	50 m freestyle S2
Silver medal – second place	2002 Argentina	50 m freestyle S2
Silver medal – second place	2006 South Africa	50 m backstroke S2
Silver medal – second place	2006 South Africa	100 m freestyle S2
Silver medal – second place	2006 South Africa	200 m freestyle S2
Bronze medal – third place	1994 Malta	50 m backstroke S2
Paralympic World Cup
Gold medal – first place	2005 Manchester	50 m backstroke S2
Gold medal – first place	2006 Manchester	50 m freestyle S2
Gold medal – first place	2008 Manchester	50 m freestyle S2
European Championships
Gold medal – first place	2009 Reykjavik	50 m freestyle S2
Silver medal – second place	2009 Reykjavik	4x50 m medley 20pts
Bronze medal – third place	2009 Reykjavik	200 m freestyle S2

James Allan Anderson OBE (born 14 April 1963) is a Scottish former paralympic swimmer who competed in the S2 classification. He is a six-time Paralympic Games, nine-time World Paraswimming champion.

== Swimming career ==
Anderson has represented Great Britain at the Paralympic Games on six occasions, in 1992, 1996, 2000, 2004, 2008 and the 2012 Summer Paralympics. He has won six Paralympic gold medals, four at the 2004 Games, in the 50 m, 100 m and 200 m freestyle and the 50 m backstroke events, and two at the 1996 Games in the 50 m backstroke and 100 m freestyle races. He has also set two world records and four European records. He also competed at the 2008 Paralympics in Beijing. He was selected again for the 2012 Paralympics in London, finishing fourth in the S2 class final of the 50m backstroke and eighth in the S2 100m freestyle.

== Honours ==
In 2004, Anderson was awarded the BBC Scotland Sports Personality of the Year award and was appointed Member of the Order of the British Empire (MBE) in the 2005 New Year Honours. He was promoted to Officer of the Order of the British Empire (OBE) in the 2009 Birthday Honours.

== Personal life ==
Anderson has cerebral palsy. He is also a former British Wheelchair Disco champion. He was born in St Andrews, Fife and resides in Broxburn.
