= Yang Yang (swimmer) =

Chinese Paralympic swimmer

Medal record

Swimming (S2)

Representing China

Paralympic Games
Gold medal – first place	2012 London	Men's 50 metre freestyle S2
Gold medal – first place	2012 London	Men's 100 metre freestyle S2
Gold medal – first place	2012 London	Men's 200 metre freestyle S2
Gold medal – first place	2012 London	Men's 50 metre backstroke S2

IPC World Championships
Gold medal – first place	2015 Glasgow	200m freestyle S2
Gold medal – first place	2015 Glasgow	50m backstroke S2

Yang Yang (born January 21, 1997) is a Chinese swimmer. He won 4 gold medals at the 2012 Summer Paralympics.
