= Liu Benying =

Chinese Paralympic swimmer

Personal information
- Nationality: Chinese

Sport
- Sport: Swimming
Medal record
Representing China
Men's Paralympic swimming
Summer Paralympics
Gold medal – first place	2016 Rio de Janeiro	Men's 200 metre freestyle S2
Silver medal – second place	2016 Rio de Janeiro	Men's 100 metre backstroke S2
Silver medal – second place	2016 Rio de Janeiro	Men's 50 metre backstroke S2
IPC Swimming World Championships
Gold medal – first place	2017 Mexico City	200m freestyle S2
Gold medal – first place	2019 London	4x50 m Freestyle Relay - 20 Points
Silver medal – second place	2017 Mexico City	50m Backstroke S2
Silver medal – second place	2017 Mexico City	100m Backstroke S2
Bronze medal – third place	2019 London City	50m Backstroke S2

Liu Benying is a Chinese swimmer. He won the gold medal at the Men's 200 metre freestyle S2 event at the 2016 Summer Paralympics with a world record and paralympic record of 3:41.54. He also won the silver medal at the Men's 100 metre backstroke S2 event with 1:48.29 and the silver medal at the Men's 50 metre backstroke S2 event with 48.84.
