= Zou Liankang =

Chinese Paralympic swimmer

Personal information
- Nationality: Chinese
- Born: August 9, 1995 (age 30)

Sport
- Sport: Swimming
Medal record
Representing China
Men's Paralympic swimming
Summer Paralympics
Gold medal – first place	2016 Rio de Janeiro	100 m Backstroke S2
Gold medal – first place	2016 Rio de Janeiro	50 m Backstroke S2
Gold medal – first place	2016 Rio de Janeiro	Mixed 4x50m Freestyle Relay 20 Points
Gold medal – first place	2020 Tokyo	50 m Backstroke S3
Gold medal – first place	2024 Paris	Mixed 4×50 m medley relay 20pts
Silver medal – second place	2016 Rio de Janeiro	Men's 200 metre Freestyle S2
Silver medal – second place	2020 Tokyo	50m freestyle S3
Asian Para Games
Gold medal – first place	2018 Jakarta	50m Backstroke S4 (1–4)
Silver medal – second place	2018 Jakarta	Mixed 4×50 m freestyle relay-20Points
Bronze medal – third place	2018 Jakarta	200m Freestyle S4 (1–4)
Bronze medal – third place	2018 Jakarta	100m Freestyle S4 (1–4)
Bronze medal – third place	2018 Jakarta	50m Freestyle S4 (1–4)
Bronze medal – third place	2022 Hangzhou	100 m freestyle S4

Zou Liankang is a Chinese swimmer. He won the gold medal at the Men's 100 metre Backstroke S2 event at the 2016 Summer Paralympics with a world record and paralympic record of 1:45.25.
