= Itzhak Mamistvalov =

Israeli Paralympic swimmer

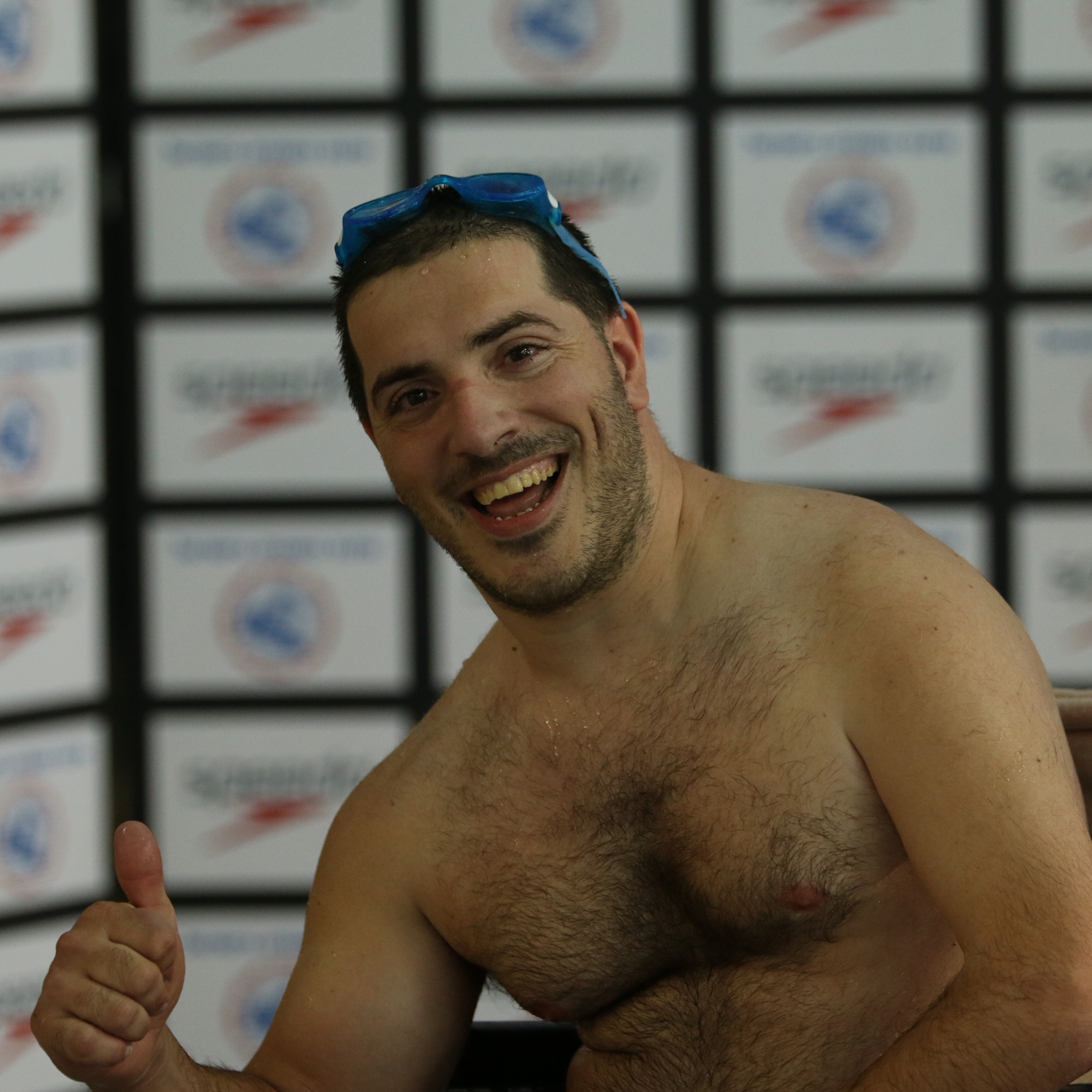

Personal information
- Native name: יצחק ממיסטבלוב
- Born: 8 October 1979

Sport
- Country: Israel
Medal record
Swimming (Paralympics)
Representing Israel
| Event | 1st | 2nd | 3rd |
|---|---|---|---|
| Paralympic Games | 2 | 1 | 1 |
| IPC World Championships | 7 | 2 | 0 |
| IPC European Championships | 2 | 1 | 1 |
| Total | 5 | 2 | 2 |
Paralympic Games
| Gold medal – first place | 2004 Athens | 100m freestyle S1 |
| Gold medal – first place | 2004 Athens | 50m freestyle S1 |
| Silver medal – second place | 2004 Athens | 200m freestyle S2 |
| Bronze medal – third place | 2012 London | 200m freestyle S2 |
IPC World Championships
| Gold medal – first place | 2002 Argentina | 50m freestyle S1 |
| Gold medal – first place | 2006 Durban | 50m freestyle S1 |
| Gold medal – first place | 2006 Durban | 100m freestyle S1 |
| Gold medal – first place | 2006 Durban | 200m freestyle S1 |
| Gold medal – first place | 2010 Eindhoven | 50m freestyle S1 |
| Gold medal – first place | 2010 Eindhoven | 100m freestyle S1 |
| Gold medal – first place | 2013 Montreal | 100m freestyle S1 |
| Silver medal – second place | 2002 Argentina | 100m freestyle S1 |
| Silver medal – second place | 2010 Eindhoven | 200m freestyle S2]] |
IPC European Championships
| Gold medal – first place | 2009 Reykjavik | 50 m freestyle S1 |
| Gold medal – first place | 2009 Reykjavik | 200 m freestyle S2 |
| Silver medal – second place | 2014 Eindhoven | 50m freestyle S1 |
| Bronze medal – third place | 2014 Eindhoven | 100m freestyle S1 |

Itzhak Mamistvalov (Hebrew: יצחק ממיסטבלוב) is an Israeli Paralympic swimmer. Mamistvalov was born with cerebral palsy and uses his right hand only when swimming. Classified S1, the class for swimmers with the most severe disabilities, he competes in S1 and S2 events.

Mamistvalov represented Israel at the 2004 Summer Paralympics in Athens, where he won two gold medals and one silver, and set two Paralympic records.

In August 2008, Mamistvalov was involved in a car accident. His car went off the road into a crowded bus stop and killed two people and also severely injured a third person, causing her to lose her right arm. Because of the accident he missed the 2008 Summer Paralympics. In July 2010 he was convicted of negligent homicide, but was spared of prison sentence because of his severe disability.

As of February 2013, Mamistvalov is IPC World Record holder in the S1 50m, 100m and 200m freestyle events.
