= Aristeidis Makrodimitris =

Greek Paralympic swimmer (born 1991)

Personal information
- Nationality: Greece
- Born: 14 February 1991 (age 35)

Sport
- Sport: Swimming
- Strokes: Backstroke, freestyle
Medal record
Men's para swimming
Representing Greece
Event	1st	2nd	3rd
Paralympic Games	0	1	2
European Championships	0	0	2
Total	0	1	4
Paralympic Games
Silver medal – second place	2012 London	50 m backstroke
Bronze medal – third place	2012 London	50 m freestyle
Bronze medal – third place	2012 London	100 m freestyle
European Championships
Bronze medal – third place	2014 Eindhoven	100m freestyle S2
Bronze medal – third place	2016 Funchal	100m backstroke S2

Aristeidis Makrodimitris (Greek: Αριστείδης Μακροδημήτρης) is a Greek Paralympic swimmer. He won three medals at the 2012 Paralympic Games, two bronze in the 50m and 100m freestyle and a silver in the 50m backstroke. He competes in the class S2.

He won the gold medal in the men's 50 metres backstroke S2 and the silver medal in the men's 100 metres backstroke S2 event at the 2018 World Para Swimming European Championships held in Dublin, Ireland. He also won the gold medal in the men's 200 metres freestyle S2 competition.

He was awarded as the Best Greek male athlete with a disability for 2018.
