= Swimming at the 2020 Summer Paralympics – freestyle relay =

The freestyle relay swimming events for the 2020 Summer Paralympics will take place at the Tokyo Aquatics Centre from August 26 to August 31, 2021. A total of 5 events will be contested.

== Schedule ==
H	Heats	½	Semifinals	F	Final

Date	Thu 26		Fri 27		Sat 28		Sun 29		Mon 30		Tue 31	
Event	M	E	M	E	M	E	M	E	M	E	M	E
Mixed 20pts 4x50m	H	F										
Mixed 49pts 4x100m											H	F
Mixed S14 4x100m					H	F						
Men's 34pts 4x100m									H	F		
Women's 34pts 4x100m							H	F				

== Medal summary ==
The following is a summary of the medals awarded across all freestyle relay events.

Event	Class	Gold		Silver		Bronze	
Men's 4 × 100 m	34 pts	Australia; Rowan Crothers; William Martin; Matt Levy; Ben Popham	3:44.31; WR	Italy; Antonio Fantin; Simone Ciulli; Simone Barlaam; Stefano Raimondi	3:45.89	Ukraine; Iurii Bozhynskyi; Denys Dubrov; Andrii Trusov; Maksym Krypak	3:47.40
Women's 4 × 100 m	34 pts	Italy; Xenia Palazzo; Vittoria Bianco; Giulia Terzi; Alessia Scortechini	4:24.85	Australia; Ellie Cole; Isabella Vincent; Emily Beecroft; Ashleigh McConnell	4:26.82	Canada; Morgan Bird; Katarina Roxon; Sabrina Duchesne; Aurélie Rivard	4:30.40
Mixed 4 × 50 m	20 pts	China; Zhang Li; Zheng Tao; Yuan Weiyi; Lu Dong	2:15.49; WR	Italy; Giulia Terzi; Arjola Trimi; Luigi Beggiato; Antonio Fantin	2:21.45	Brazil; Patrícia Pereira; Daniel Dias; Joana Neves; Talisson Glock	2:24.82
Mixed 4 × 100 m	S14	Great Britain; Reece Dunn; Bethany Firth; Jessica-Jane Applegate; Jordan Catchpole	3:40.63; WR	Australia; Ricky Betar; Benjamin Hance; Ruby Storm; Madeleine McTernan	3:46.38	Brazil; Gabriel Bandeira; Ana Karolina Soares; Débora Carneiro; Felipe Vila Real	3:51.23
Mixed 4 × 100 m	49 pts	RPC; Ilnur Garipov; Anna Krivshina; Daria Pikalova; Vladimir Sotnikov	3:53.79; PR	Brazil; Wendell Pereira; Douglas Matera; Lucilene da Silva; Maria Carolina Santiago	3:54.95	Ukraine; Maryna Piddubna; Maksym Veraksa; Anna Stetsenko; Kyrylo Garashchenko	3:55.15

== Results ==
The following were the results of the finals only of each of the freestyle relay events in each of the classifications. Further details of each event, including where appropriate heats and semi finals results, are available on that event's dedicated page.

=== Mixed 20pts 4x50m ===
The final in this classification will take place on 26 August 2021:

Rank	Lane	Name	Nationality	Time	Notes
1st place, gold medalist(s)	6		China	2:15.49	WR
2nd place, silver medalist(s)	4		Italy	2:21.45	
3rd place, bronze medalist(s)	7		Brazil	2:24.82	
4	5		Ukraine	2:24.89	
5	3		Spain	2:25.66	
6	2		RPC	2:35.66	
7	8		Turkey	2:42.43	
8	1		Great Britain	2:48.34	

=== Mixed 49pts 4x100m ===
The final in this classification took place on 31 August 2021:

Rank	Lane	Name	Nationality	Time	Notes
1st place, gold medalist(s)	3	Ilnur Garipov (S11); Anna Krivshina (S13); Daria Pikalova (S12); Vladimir Sotnikov (S13)	RPC	3:53.79	PR
2nd place, silver medalist(s)	5	Wendell Pereira (S11); Douglas Matera (S13); Lucilene da Silva (S12); Maria Carolina Santiago (S12)	Brazil	3:54.95	
3rd place, bronze medalist(s)	4	Maryna Piddubna (S11); Maksym Veraksa (S12); Anna Stetsenko (S13); Kyrylo Garashchenko (S13)	Ukraine	3:55.15	
4	6	José Ramón Cantero Elvira (S11); María Delgado (S12); Ariadna Edo Beltrán (S13); Iván Salguero (S13)	Spain	4:03.38	
5	2	Uchu Tomita (S11); Genki Saito (S13); Tomomi Ishiura (S11); Ayano Tsujiuchi (S13)	Japan	4:08.86	
6	7	Hua Dongdong (S11); Li Guizhi (S11); Cai Liwen (S11); Yang Bozun (S11)	China	4:18.60	

=== Mixed S14 4x100m ===
The final in this classification took place on 28 August 2021:

Rank	Lane	Nation	Swimmers	Time	Notes
1st place, gold medalist(s)	4	Great Britain	Reece Dunn; Bethany Firth; Jessica-Jane Applegate; Jordan Catchpole	3:40.63	WR
2nd place, silver medalist(s)	3	Australia	Ricky Betar; Benjamin Hance; Ruby Storm; Madeleine McTernan	3:46.38	OC
3rd place, bronze medalist(s)	6	Brazil	Gabriel Bandeira; Ana Karolina Soares; Débora Carneiro; Felipe Vila Real	3:51.23	AM
4	7	Japan	Dai Tokairin; Naohide Yamaguchi; Kasumi Fukui; Mami Inoue	3:57.18	AS
5	2	Hong Kong	Tang Wai-lok; Chan Yui-lam; Hui Ka Chun; Cheung Ho Ching	4:00.86	
	5	RPC	Mikhail Kuliabin; Viacheslav Emeliantsev; Olga Poteshkina; Valeriia Shabalina	DSQ	

=== Men's 34pts 4x100m ===
The final in this classification will take place on 30 August 2021:

Rank	Lane	Name	Nationality	Time	Notes
1st place, gold medalist(s)					
2nd place, silver medalist(s)					
3rd place, bronze medalist(s)					
...					

=== Women's 34pts 4x100m ===
The final in this classification took place on 29 August 2021. In the competition, both Great Britain and the United States were disqualified for early takeoffs in the second exchange. United States filed a protest but the decision was upheld.

Rank	Lane	Nation	Swimmers	Time	Notes
1st place, gold medalist(s)	3	Italy	Xenia Palazzo (S8) (1:07.06); Vittoria Bianco (S9) (1:07.55); Giulia Terzi (S7) (1:08.75); Alessia Scortechini (S10) (1:01.49)	4:24.85	
2nd place, silver medalist(s)	7	Australia	Ellie Cole (S9) (1:03.41); Isabella Vincent (S7) (1:15.78); Emily Beecroft (S9) (1:04.24); Ashleigh McConnell (S9) (1:03.39)	4:26.82	
3rd place, bronze medalist(s)	6	Canada	Morgan Bird (S8) (1:11.66); Katarina Roxon (S9) (1:06.91); Sabrina Duchesne (S7) (1:13.73); Aurelie Rivard (S10) (58.10)	4:30.40	
4	2	China	Jialing Xu (S9) (1:05.37); Zhang Meng (S10) (1:02.63); Jiang Yuyan (S6) (1:11.25); Lingling Song (S6) (1:13.96)	4:33.21	
5	1	Hungary	Zsófia Konkoly (S9) (1:04.10); Fanni Illés (S6) (1:23.14); Kata Payer (S9) (1:09.10); Bianka Pap (S10) (1:02.32)	4:38.66	
6	8	RPC	Ani Palian (S7) (1:17.44); Mariia Pavlova (S8) (1:13.33); Elena Kliachkina (S9) (1:08.57); Anastasiia Gontar (S10) (1:02.44)	4:41.78	
	4	Great Britain	Stephanie Millward (S9) (1:07.81); Zara Mullooly (S10); Grace Harvey (S6); Toni Shaw (S9)	DSQ	
	5	United States	Natalie Sims (S9) (1:05.28); Morgan Stickney (S8); Jessica Long (S8); Hannah Aspden (S9)	DSQ	
