= 2023 Australian Swimming Championships =

- Host city: Gold Coast, Queensland
- Date: 17–20 April
- Venue: Gold Coast Aquatic Centre
- Events: 64 (men: 31; women: 31, mixed: 2)

The 2023 Australian Swimming Championships were held from 17 to 20 April 2023 at the Gold Coast Aquatic Centre in Gold Coast, Queensland.

This event doubled as the national selection trials for the 2023 World Para Swimming Championships, held in Manchester in July. It also formed part of the selection process for the 2023 World Aquatics Championships and 2023 US TYR Pro Championships, however final team selections will not be announced until the 2023 Australian Swimming Trials in Melbourne, Victoria in June.

There were no major withdrawals from the event, with the exception of 2020 Olympian Chelsea Hodges, who required surgery to repair torn cartilage in her right hip. Minna Atherton also missed the event due to injury.

== Schedule ==
Legend
Key	H	½	F	TF
Value	Heats	Semifinals	Final	Timed final

M = Morning session (starting at 10:00), E = Evening session (starting at 18:00)

Men
Date →	17 April		18 April		19 April		20 April	
Event ↓	M	E	M	E	M	E	M	E
50 m freestyle					H	F		
100 m freestyle							H	F
200 m freestyle			H	F				
400 m freestyle	H	F						
800 m freestyle					TF	TF		
1500 m freestyle			TF	TF				
50 m backstroke			H	F				
100 m backstroke					H	F		
200 m backstroke	H	F						
50 m breaststroke							H	F
100 m breaststroke	H	F						
200 m breaststroke			H	F				
50 m butterfly	H	F						
100 m butterfly					H	F		
200 m butterfly							H	F
200 m individual medley					H	F		
400 m individual medley							H	F
4 × 100 metre freestyle relay								TF
4 × 200 metre freestyle relay		TF						
4 × 100 metre medley relay				TF				

Men Multi-Class
Date →	17 April		18 April		19 April		20 April	
Event ↓	M	E	M	E	M	E	M	E
50 m freestyle			H	F				
100 m freestyle					H	F		
200 m freestyle	H	F						
400 m freestyle	H	F						
50 m backstroke					H	F		
100 m backstroke			H	F				
50 m breaststroke							H	F
100 m breaststroke			H	F				
50 m butterfly	H	F						
100 m butterfly							H	F
200 m individual medley							H	F

Mixed
Date →	17 April		18 April		19 April		20 April	
Event ↓	M	E	M	E	M	E	M	E
150 m individual medley (multi class)							H	F
4 × 100 m medley relay						TF		

Women
Date →	17 April		18 April		19 April		20 April	
Event ↓	M	E	M	E	M	E	M	E
50 m freestyle			H	F				
100 m freestyle	H	F						
200 m freestyle							H	F
400 m freestyle					H	F		
800 m freestyle	TF	TF						
1500 m freestyle							TF	TF
50 m backstroke					H	F		
100 m backstroke			H	F				
200 m backstroke							H	F
50 m breaststroke	H	F						
100 m breaststroke			H	F				
200 m breaststroke					H	F		
50 m butterfly					H	F		
100 m butterfly							H	F
200 m butterfly			H	F				
200 m individual medley	H	F						
400 m individual medley			H	F				
4 × 100 metre freestyle relay								TF
4 × 200 metre freestyle relay						TF		
4 × 100 metre medley relay				TF				

Women's Multi-Class
Date →	17 April		18 April		19 April		20 April	
Event ↓	M	E	M	E	M	E	M	E
50 m freestyle			H	F				
100 m freestyle					H	F		
200 m freestyle	H	F						
400 m freestyle	H	F						
50 m backstroke					H	F		
100 m backstroke			H	F				
50 m breaststroke							H	F
100 m breaststroke			H	F				
50 m butterfly	H	F						
100 m butterfly							H	F
200 m individual medley							H	F

== Medal winners ==
The medallist for the open events are below.

=== Men's events ===
Event	Gold		Silver		Bronze	
50 metre freestyle	Cameron McEvoy; Somerville House (Qld)	22.11	Thomas Nowakowski; Somerset (Qld)	22.17	Flynn Southam; Rackley (Qld)	22.32
100 metre freestyle	Kyle Chalmers; Marion (SA)	48.00	Kai Taylor; St Peters Western (Qld)	48.41	Flynn Southam; Rackley (Qld)	48.53
200 metre freestyle	Kai Taylor; St Peters Western (Qld)	1:46.65	Flynn Southam; Rackley (Qld)	1:46.67	Elijah Winnington; St Peters Western (Qld)	1:47.24
400 metre freestyle	Samuel Short; Rackley (Qld)	3:42.46	Elijah Winnington; St Peters Western (Qld)	3:46.39	Thomas Neill; Rackley (Qld)	3:49.28
800 metre freestyle	Samuel Short; Rackley (Qld)	7:42.96	Elijah Winnington; St Peters Western (Qld)	7:49.81	Matthew Galea; SOPAC (NSW)	7:58.64
1500 metre freestyle	Samuel Short; Rackley (Qld)	14:58.90	Matthew Galea; SOPAC (NSW)	15:10.22	Nicholas Sloman; Noosa (Qld)	15:18.20
50 metre backstroke	Ben Armbruster; Bond (Qld)	25.27	Mark Nikolaev; Russia	25.43	Bradley Woodward; Mingara (NSW)	25.44
100 metre backstroke	Bradley Woodward; Mingara (NSW)	54.66	Mark Nikolaev; Russia	54.76	Ty Hartwell; Chandler (Qld)	54.83
200 metre backstroke	Bradley Woodward; Mingara (NSW)	1:57.42	Joshua Edwards-Smith; Griffith University (Qld)	1:57.63	Ty Hartwell; Chandler (Qld)	1:57.84
50 metre breaststroke	Sam Williamson; Melbourne Vicentre (Vic)	27.48	Joshua Yong; UWA West Coast (WA)	27.84	Joshua Collett; Bond (Qld)	28.06
100 metre breaststroke	Zac Stubblety-Cook; Chandler (Qld)	1:00.07	Joshua Yong; UWA West Coast (WA)	1:00.57	Matthew Wilson; SOPAC (NSW)	1:00.68
200 metre breaststroke	Zac Stubblety-Cook; Chandler (Qld)	2:09.03	Matthew Wilson; SOPAC (NSW)	2:12.38	Angus Menzies; Knox Pymble (NSW)	2:13.35
50 metre butterfly	Ben Armbruster; Bond (Qld)	23.05 ACR	Kyle Chalmers; Marion (SA)	23.35	Cameron McEvoy; Somerville House (Qld)	23.68
100 metre butterfly	Matthew Temple; Marion (SA)	51.49	Ben Armbruster; Bond (Qld)	51.96	Shaun Champion; Abbotsleigh (NSW)	52.01
200 metre butterfly	Matthew Temple; Marion (SA)	1:56.96	Ruan Van Der Riet; USC Spartans (Qld)	1:59.22	Bowen Gough; Griffith University (Qld)	1:59.42
200 metre individual medley	Thomas Neill; Rackley (Qld)	1:58.99	Finlay Knox; Canada	1:59.19	William Petric; Nunawading (Vic)	2:00.84
400 metre individual medley	Brendon Smith; Griffith University (Qld)	4:16.37	Se-Bom Lee; Carlile (NSW)	4:16.73	Wiliam Petric; Nunawading (Vic)	4:17.85
4 × 100 metre freestyle relay	Bond A (Qld); Ben Armbruster (50.63); Joshua Collett (50.05); Jesse Coleman (49.96); Flynn Southam (47.71)	3:18.35	St Andrew's A (Qld); Jezze Gorman (50.93); Jack Carr (48.99); Isaac Cooper (49.45); Lewis Blackburn (50.85)	3:20.22	Knox Pymble A (NSW); Tomas Kapocius (50.95); Joseph Hamson (50.44); Joel Ivory (49.66); Tyson Upton (50.35)	3:21.40
4 × 200 metre freestyle relay	Nunawading A (NSW); Elliot Rogerson (1:51.06); William Petric (1:50.75); Silas Harris (1:51.07); Evan Chee (1:54.20)	7:27.08	Propulsion A (Vic); Robbe Dilissen (1:55.14); Lev Makarushkin (1:53.00); Lachlan Jackett-Simpson (1:53.60); James McBride (1:55.08)	7:36.82	Sydney University A (NSW); Cormac Guthrie (1:54.21); Fergus Henderson (1:57.78); Harry Hay (1:56.11); Thomas Hay (1:51.63)	7:39.73
4 × 100 metre medley relay	Marion A (SA); Mark Ducaj (59.13); Harrison Biddell (1:03.40); Matthew Temple (51.50); Kyle Chalmers (48.09)	3:42.12	Chandler A (Qld); Ty Hartwell (54.75); Bailey Lello (1:02.99); Lucas Humeniuk (53.83); Harrison Turner (50.83)	3:42.40	Knox Pymble A (NSW); Toby Peknice (58.17); Angus Menzies (1:01.68); Joseph Hamson (53.75); Tomas Kapocius (50.34)	3:43.94
WR World record | CR Commonwealth record | OC Oceanian record | AR Australian record | ACR Australian Allcomers record | Club Australian Club record

=== Men's multi-class events ===
Event	Gold		Silver		Bronze	
50 metre freestyle	Tom Gallagher S10; Somerset (Qld)	23.85	Rowan Crothers S10; Yeronga Park (Qld)	24.16	Layton Nicholas S15; Propulsion (Vic)	23.81
100 metre freestyle	Rowan Crothers S10; Yeronga Park (Qld)	52.05	Tom Gallagher S10; Somerset (Qld)	52.89	Jack Ireland S14; University of Queensland (Qld)	52.83
200 metre freestyle	Jack Ireland S14; University of Queensland (Qld)	1:56.40	Liam Schluter S14; USC Spartans (Qld)	1:56.95	Darren Sisman S14; Engadine (NSW)	1:59.11
400 metre freestyle	Timothy Hodge S9; ACU Blacktown (NSW)	4:15.43 Q	Brenden Hall S9; USC Spartans (Qld)	4:18.18	Harrison Vig S9; University of Queensland (Qld)	4:24.59
50 metre backstroke	Timothy Hodge S9; ACU Blacktown (NSW)	29.26	Declan Budd S14; Knox Pymble (NSW)	31.46	Dylan Logan S15; Melbourne (Vic)	29.15
100 metre backstroke	Benjamin Hance S14; St Andrew's (Qld)	57.46	Timothy Hodge S9; ACU Blacktown (NSW)	1:01.29	Ricky Betar S14; Cruiz (ACT)	1:01.62
50 metre breaststroke	Jake Michel S14; Carina Leagues (Qld)	29.34	Timothy Disken S8; PLC Aquatic (Vic)	32.92	Dylan Logan S15; Melbourne (Vic)	32.37
100 metre breaststroke	Jake Michel S14; Carina Leagues (Qld)	1:05.47	Timothy Hodge S9; ACU Blacktown (NSW)	1:12.37	Riley Moore S9; Woy Woy (NSW)	1:12.22
50 metre butterfly	Nicholas Layton S15; Propulsion (Vic)	24.92	Dylan Logan S15; Melbourne (Vic)	26.24	Declan Budd S14; Knox Pymble (NSW)	27.88
100 metre butterfly	Timothy Hodge S9; ACU Blacktown (NSW)	59.69	Col Pearse S10; Nunawading (Vic)	56.76	Alex Saffy S10; Bunbury (Qld)	57.46
200 metre individual medley	Timothy Hodge S9; ACU Blacktown (NSW)	2:12.06	Ricky Betar S14; Cruiz (ACT)	2:12.72	Liam Schluter S14; USC Spartans (Qld)	2:14.92
WR World record | CR Commonwealth record | OC Oceanian record | AR Australian record | ACR Australian Allcomers record | Club Australian Club record

=== Women's events ===
Event	Gold		Silver		Bronze	
50 metre freestyle	Shayna Jack; St Peters Western (Qld)	24.45	Meg Harris; Marion (SA)	24.55	Cate Campbell; Rackley (Qld)	24.88
100 metre freestyle	Mollie O'Callaghan; St Peters Western (Qld)	52.63	Shayna Jack; St Peters Western (Qld)	52.64	Emma McKeon; Griffith University (Qld)	53.22
200 metre freestyle	Mollie O'Callaghan; St Peters Western (Qld)	1:55.15	Ariarne Titmus; St Peters Western (Qld)	1:55.28	Shayna Jack; St Peters Western (Qld)	1:55.37
400 metre freestyle	Ariarne Titmus; St Peters Western (Qld)	4:00.49	Lani Pallister; Griffith University (Qld)	4:05.86	Eve Thomas; New Zealand	4:06.10
800 metre freestyle	Ariarne Titmus; St Peters Western (Qld)	8:20.19	Lani Pallister; Griffith University (Qld)	8:24.72	Madeleine Gough; Carlile (NSW)	8:26.08
1500 metre freestyle	Madeleine Gough; Carlile (NSW)	16:08.76	Tiana Kritzinger; Rackley (Qld)	16:33.96	Chelsea Gubecka; Yeronga Park (Qld)	16:34.14
50 metre backstroke	Mollie O'Callaghan; St Peters Western (Qld)	27.42	Bronte Job; Rackley (Qld)	28.21	Jaclyn Barclay; St Peters Western (Qld)	28.23
100 metre backstroke	Kaylee McKeown; Griffith University (Qld)	57.90	Mollie O'Callaghan; St Peters Western (Qld)	58.42	Jaclyn Barclay; St Peters Western (Qld)	1:00.31
200 metre backstroke	Jaclyn Barclay; St Peters Western (Qld)	2:11.50	Hannah Fredericks; St Peters Western (Qld)	2:11.72	Jenna Forrester; St Peters Western (Qld)	2:11.95
50 metre breaststroke	Jenna Strauch; Miami (Qld)	31.16	Mia O'Leary; Bond (Qld)	31.29	Talara-Jade Dixon; St Hilda's (WA)	31.53
100 metre breaststroke	Abbey Harkin; St Peters Western (Qld)	1:07.77	Jenna Strauch; Miami (Qld)	1:08.16	Talara-Jade Dixon; St Hilda's (WA)	1:08.60
200 metre breaststroke	Kaylee McKeown; Griffith University (Qld)	2:24.18	Abbey Harkin; St Peters Western (Qld)	2:25.72	Jenna Strauch; Miami (Qld)	2:25.94
50 metre butterfly	Brianna Throssell; St Peters Western (Qld)	26.06	Alexandria Perkins; USC Spartans (Qld)	26.26	Lily Price; Rackley (Qld)	26.46
100 metre butterfly	Brianna Throssell; St Peters Western (Qld)	57.57	Alexandria Perkins; USC Spartans (Qld)	57.64	Kayla Costa; Southport (Qld)	59.37
200 metre butterfly	Elizabeth Dekkers; Chandler (Qld)	2:06.55	Brianna Throssell; St Peters Western (Qld)	2:07.08	Emma McKeon; Griffith University (Qld)	2:09.47
200 metre individual medley	Kaylee McKeown; Griffith University (Qld)	2:08.16 ACR	Jenna Forrester; St Peters Western (Qld)	2:09.32	Ella Ramsay; Chandler (Qld)	2:12.39
400 metre individual medley	Jenna Forrester; St Peters Western (Qld)	4:35.05	Kiah Melverton; St Peters Western (Qld)	4:45.41	Ella Ramsay; Chandler (Qld)	4:45.48
4 × 100 metre freestyle relay	Marion A (SA); Ellysia Oldsen (57.43); Madison Wilson (53.75); Isabel McLachlan (58.45); Meg Harris (53.65)	3:43.28	St Andrew's A (Qld); Georgia Pendergast (55.99); Chloe Rowe-Hagans (57.04); Tahlia Prenzler (58.86); Lauren Maguire (59.40)	3:51.29	Knox Pymble A (NSW); Claudia Fydler (59.77); Bella Zhang (57.38); Jaya Lilienthal (59.51); Paris Zhang (57.65)	3:54.31
4 × 200 metre freestyle relay	St Andrew's (Qld); Georgia Pendergast (2:01.88); Tahlia Prenzler (2:09.37); Finella Gibbs-Beal (2:07.81); Lauren Maguire (2:08.43)	8:27.49	Nunawading A (Vic); Chantelle Underwood (2:10.38); Kirralee Shepherd (2:09.70); Lucy Webster (2:08.25); Reidel Smith (2:11.62)	8:39.95	None awarded	
4 × 100 metre medley relay	Bond A (Qld); Layla Day (1:01.79); Tilly King (1:10.09); Mikayla Bird (1:00.81); Milla Jansen (55.21)	4:07.90	Griffith University A (Qld); Jade Starr (1:06.84); Hayley Mackinder (1:09.88); Jessica Madden (1:02.70); Phoebe Bentley (55.35)	4:14.77	Nunawading A (Vic); Olivia Lefoe (1:03.71); Zoe Deacon (1:10.28); Abby Harrington (1:04.83); Abbey Kearney (56.76)	4:15.58
WR World record | CR Commonwealth record | OC Oceanian record | AR Australian record | ACR Australian Allcomers record | Club Australian Club record

=== Women's multi-class events ===
Event	Gold		Silver		Bronze	
50 metre freestyle	Katja Dedekind S13; Yeronga Park (Qld)	27.71	Jasmine Greenwood S10; Cruiz (ACT)	28.58	Rachael Watson S4; Chandler (Qld)	39.65
100 metre freestyle	Alexa Leary S9; St Hilda's (Qld)	1:01.08	Emily Beecroft S9; USC Spartans (Qld)	1:03.93	Jasmine Greenwood S10; Cruiz (ACT)	1:02.47
200 metre freestyle	Madeleine McTernan S14; All Saints (Qld)	2:13.01	Ruby Storm S14; St Andrew's (Qld)	2:14.85	Jade Lucy S14; SLC Aquadot (NSW)	2:17.73
400 metre freestyle	Lakeisha Patterson S9; USC Spartans (Qld)	4:44.31 Q	Poppy Wilson S10; Yeronga Park (Qld)	4:49.25 Q	Chloe Osborn S7; ACU Blackburn (NSW)	5:29.15
50 metre backstroke	Madeleine McTernan S14; All Saints (Qld)	33.07	Hannah Price S10; Campbelltown (NSW)	34.98	Michelle Fawer S10; Engadine (NSW)	35.40
100 metre backstroke	Katja Dedekind S13; Yeronga Park (Qld)	1:07.44	Holly Warn S7; St Hilda's (Qld)	1:26.97	Madeleine McTernan S14; All Saints (Qld)	1:10.97
50 metre breaststroke	Keira Stephens S9; Southport (Qld); Jenna Jones S12; USC Spartans (Qld)	35.54 37.63			Ashley Van Risjwijk S14; Wagga Wagga (NSW)	37.79
100 metre breaststroke	Keira Stephens S9; Southport (Qld)	1:16.18 Q	Paige Leonhardt S14; USC Spartans (Qld)	1:18.53	Ashley Van Risjwijk S14; Wagga Wagga (NSW)	1:20.34
50 metre butterfly	Paige Leonhardt S14; USC Spartans (Qld)	29.92	Taylor Corry S14; Kincumber Pacific Dolphins (NSW)	30.50	Montana Atkinson S14; Helensvale (Qld)	31.39
100 metre butterfly	Taylor Corry S14; Kincumber Pacific Dolphins (NSW)	1:08.54	Jasmine Greenwood S10; Cruiz (ACT)	1:08.05	Ruby Storm S14; St Andrew's (Qld)	1:09.43
200 metre individual medley	Katja Dedekind S13; Yeronga Park (Qld)	2:33.64	Lakeisha Patterson S9; USC Spartans (Qld)	2:38.80	Kael Thompson S14; Sunshine Coast Grammar (Qld)	2:39.19
WR World record | CR Commonwealth record | OC Oceanian record | AR Australian record | ACR Australian Allcomers record | Club Australian Club record

=== Mixed events ===
Event	Gold		Silver		Bronze	
150 metre individual medley (multi class)	Ahmed Kelly; Yarra Plenty (Vic)	3:05.84	Grant Patterson; Central Cairns (Qld)	3:12.43	None awarded	
4 × 100 metre medley relay	Nunawading A (Vic); Olivia Lefoe (1:02.27); Zoe Deacon (1:11.62); William Petric (53.86); Zander Coates (50.23)	3:57.98	Knox Pymble A (NSW); Paris Zhang (1:05.50); Angus Menzies (1:01.92); Joseph Hamson (53.82); Claudia Fydler (59.29)	4:00.53	Marion A (SA); Isabel McLachlan (1:05.31); Harrison Biddell (1:03.29); Ellysia Oldsen (1:02.09); Mark Ducaj (51.72)	4:02.41
WR World record | CR Commonwealth record | OC Oceanian record | AR Australian record | ACR Australian Allcomers record | Club Australian Club record

== Records broken ==
During the 2023 Australian Swimming Championships the following records were set.

=== World records ===
Event	Name (Previous)	Time (Previous)	Year	Location	Name (New)	Time (New)	Difference
200m individual medley	(Australia) Timothy Hodge SM9	2:13.27	2023	Melbourne, Australia	(Australia) Timothy Hodge	2:12.06	-1.21

=== All Comers and Championship records ===
Event	Name (Previous)	Time (Previous)	Year	Location	Name (New)	Time (New)	Difference
200m individual medley	(Australia) Kaylee McKeown	2:08.19	2021	Adelaide, Australia	(Australia) Kaylee McKeown	2:08.16	-0.03
50m butterfly	(Australia) Geoff Huegill	23.11	2009	Canberra, Australia	(Australia) Ben Armbruster	23.05	-0.06

== Paralympic team ==
The following 26 Paralympic athletes were selected to be part of the team to represent Australia by meeting the qualifying times in either the heats or finals.

Men	Women
Jesse Aungles; Ricky Betar; Rowan Crothers; Tom Gallager; Brenden Hall; Benjamin Hance; Timothy Hodge; Jack Ireland; Ahmed Kelly; Will Martin; Jake Michel; Col Pearse; Alex Saffy	Emily Beecroft; Katja Dedekind; Jasmine Greenwood; Ella Jones; Jenna Jones; Alexa Leary; Paige Leonhardt; Madeleine McTernan; Lakeisha Patterson; Keira Stephens; Ruby Storm; Rachel Watson; Poppy Wilson

== Broadcast ==
In April 2023, it was announced that the Nine Network's streaming service 9Now had secured an exclusive broadcast streaming deal with Swimming Australia, after the network had previously committed to broadcasting the next five Olympic Games as well as the 2023 World Aquatics Championships in Fukuoka, Japan.
