= 2022 World Para Swimming Championships – Medley relays =

The medley relay events at the 2022 World Para Swimming Championships were held at the Penteada Olympic Swimming Complex in Madeira between 12–18 June.

== Medalists ==
| Event | Gold | Silver | Bronze |
|---|---|---|---|
| Mixed 4x50m medley relay 20pts | United States; Ellie Marks; Rudy Garcia-Tolson; Abbas Karimi; Leanne Smith | Italy; Monica Boggioni; Efrem Morelli; Giulia Terzi; Francesco Bocciardo; Federico Bicelli; Giulia Ghiretti | Spain; Antoni Ponce Bertran; Miguel Luque; Marta Fernández Infante; Nahia Zudaire Borrezo |
| Mixed 4x100m medley relay 34pts | Australia; Timothy Hodge; Keira Stephens; Emily Beecroft; Matthew Levy | Spain; Iñigo Llopis Sanz; Anastasiya Dmytriv Dmytriv; José Antonio Marí Alcaraz; Sarai Gascón | Netherlands; Bas Takken; Lisa Kruger; Florianne Bultje; Thijs van Hofweegen |
| Mixed 4x100m medley relay 49pts | Brazil; Maria Carolina Gomes Santiago; Guilherme Batista Silva; José Luiz Perdigão Maia; Lucilene da Silva Sousa | Spain; Enrique José Alhambra Mollar; Marian Polo López; María Delgado Nadal; José Ramón Cantero Elvira | Japan; Chikako Ono; Keiichi Kimura; Genki Saito; Ayano Tsujiuchi |
| Mixed 4x100m medley relay S14 | Great Britain; Poppy Maskill; Scott Quin; Reece Dunn; Bethany Firth | Australia; Benjamin Hance; Jake Michel; Paige Leonhardt; Madeleine McTernan | Brazil; Ana Karolina Soares de Oliveira; Joao Pedro Brutos de Oliveira; Gabriel Bandeira; Débora Borges Carneiro |

== Results ==
Mixed 4x50m Medley Relay 20pts Finals

Eight nations took part.

| Rank | Lane | Nation | Swimmers | Time | Notes |
|---|---|---|---|---|---|
| 1st place, gold medalist(s) | 4 | United States | Ellie Marks; Rudy Garcia-Tolson; Abbas Karimi; Leanne Smith | 2:32.49 | WR |
| 2nd place, silver medalist(s) | 6 | Italy | Monica Boggioni; Efrem Morelli; Giulia Terzi; Francesco Bocciardo | 2:42.66 | |
| 3rd place, bronze medalist(s) | 3 | Spain | Antoni Ponce Bertran; Miguel Luque; Marta Fernández Infante; Nahia Zudaire Borrezo | 2:42.81 | |
| 4 | 5 | Brazil | Samuel da Silva de Oliveira; Laila Suzigan Abate; Talisson Henrique Glock; Lidia Vieira da Cruz | 2:43.16 | |
| 5 | 7 | Great Britain | Lyndon Longhorne; Grace Harvey; William Perry; Tully Kearney | 2:54.05 | |
| 6 | 1 | Mexico | Diego López Díaz; Naomi Somellera Mandujano; Karla Francesca Bravo Gonzalez; Ángel Camacho Ramírez | 2:54.47 | |
| 7 | 2 | Greece | Alexandra Stamatopoulou; Antonios Tsapatakis; Maria Tsakona; Georgios Sfaltos | 2:59.03 | |
| 8 | 8 | Canada | Shelby Newkirk; Jacob Brayshaw; Jordan Tucker; Felix Cowan | 3:40.02 | |

Mixed 4x100m Medley Relay 34pts Finals

| Rank | Lane | Nation | Swimmers | Time | Notes |
|---|---|---|---|---|---|
| 1st place, gold medalist(s) | 4 | Australia | Timothy Hodge; Keira Stephens; Emily Beecroft; Matthew Levy | 4:29.86 | |
| 2nd place, silver medalist(s) | 5 | Spain | Iñigo Llopis Sanz; Anastasiya Dmytriv Dmytriv; José Antonio Marí Alcaraz; Sarai Gascón | 4:31.96 | |
| 3rd place, bronze medalist(s) | 3 | Netherlands | Bas Takken; Lisa Kruger; Florianne Bultje; Thijs van Hofweegen | 4:34.79 | |
| 4 | 7 | Italy | Xenia Francesca Palazzo; Stefano Raimondi; Simone Barlaam; Giulia Terzi | 4:37.24 | |
| 5 | 1 | Brazil | Mariana Ribeiro; Lucas Lamente Mozela; Gabriel Cristiano Silva de Souza; Cecília Kethlen Jerônimo de Araújo | 4:39.36 | |
| 6 | 2 | Great Britain | Alice Tai; Maisie Summers-Newton; James Hollis; Oliver Carter | 4:40.58 | |
| 7 | 6 | United States | Robert Griswold; Ray Morgan; Elizabeth Smith; Audrey Kim | 4:40.73 | |
| 8 | 8 | Canada | Shelby Newkirk; James Leroux; Jack Gill; Katarina Roxon | 4:43.92 | |

Mixed 4x100m Medley Relay 49pts Finals

| Rank | Lane | Nation | Swimmers | Time | Notes |
|---|---|---|---|---|---|
| 1st place, gold medalist(s) | 3 | Brazil | Maria Carolina Gomes Santiago; Guilherme Batista Silva; José Luiz Perdigão Maia; Lucilene da Silva Sousa | 4:33.08 | |
| 2nd place, silver medalist(s) | 4 | Spain | Enrique José Alhambra Mollar; Marian Polo López; María Delgado Nadal; José Ramón Cantero Elvira | 4:33.30 | |
| 3rd place, bronze medalist(s) | 6 | Japan | Chikako Ono; Keiichi Kimura; Genki Saito; Ayano Tsujiuchi | 4:38.66 | |
| 4 | 5 | Great Britain | Matthew Redfern; Rebecca Redfern; Stephen Clegg; Scarlett Humphrey | 4:39.67 | |

Mixed 4x100m Medley Relay S14 Finals

| Rank | Lane | Nation | Swimmers | Time | Notes |
|---|---|---|---|---|---|
| 1st place, gold medalist(s) | 6 | Great Britain | Poppy Maskill; Scott Quin; Reece Dunn; Bethany Firth | 4:09.29 | |
| 2nd place, silver medalist(s) | 4 | Australia | Benjamin Hance; Jake Michel; Paige Leonhardt; Madeleine McTernan | 4:09.30 | |
| 3rd place, bronze medalist(s) | 3 | Brazil | Ana Karolina Soares de Oliveira; Joao Pedro Brutos de Oliveira; Gabriel Bandeira; Débora Borges Carneiro | 4:13.35 | |
| 4 | 5 | Japan | Kasumi Fukui; Naohide Yamaguchi; Anku Matsuda; Mami Inoue | 4:21.37 | |
| 5 | 2 | Canada | Tyson MacDonald; Nicholas Bennett; Justine Morrier; Angela Marina | 4:29.96 | |
