= 2022 World Para Swimming Championships – Freestyle relays =

The freestyle relay events at the 2022 World Para Swimming Championships were held at the Penteada Olympic Swimming Complex in Madeira between 12–18 June.

== Medalists ==
Event	Gold	Silver	Bronze
Mixed 4x50m freestyle relay 20pts	Brazil; Lidia Vieira da Cruz; Daniel Xavier Mendes; Joana Maria da Silva Neves Euzébio; Samuel da Silva de Oliveira; Patrícia Pereira dos Santos	Mexico; Nely Edith Miranda Herrera; Vianney Marlen Trejo Delgadillo; Ángel de Jesús Camacho Ramírez; Juan Jose Gutierrez Bermudez; Karina Amayrani Hernandez Torres; Cristopher Gregorio Tronco Sánchez	Italy; Giulia Ghiretti; Monica Boggioni; Luigi Beggiato; Antonio Fantin
Mixed 4x100m freestyle relay 34pts	Italy; Giulia Terzi; Xenia Francesca Palazzo; Simone Barlaam; Stefano Raimondi; Antonio Fantin; Riccardo Menciotti; Alessia Scortechini	United States; McKenzie Coan; Audrey Kim; Robert Griswold; Jamal Hill; Elizabeth Smith; Morgan Stickney; Matthew Torres	Spain; Iñigo Llopis Sanz; Sarai Gascón; Nahia Zudaire Borrezo; Ariel Enrique Schrenck Martinez; Jacobo Garrido Brun; Núria Marquès Soto
Mixed 4x100m freestyle relay 49pts	Brazil; Matheus Rheine; Douglas Matera; Lucilene da Silva Sousa; Maria Carolina Gomes Santiago	Spain; José Ramón Cantero Elvira; María Delgado Nadal; Ivan Salguero Oteiza; Marian Polo López	Great Britain; Hannah Russell; Matthew Redfern; Scarlett Humphrey; Stephen Clegg
Mixed 4x100m freestyle relay S14	Great Britain; Thomas Hamer; Bethany Firth; Jessica-Jane Applegate; Reece Dunn	Australia; Jack Ireland; Benjamin Hance; Ruby Storm; Madeleine McTernan	Brazil; Gabriel Bandeira; Ana Karolina Soares de Oliveira; Débora Borges Carneiro; Joao Pedro Brutos de Oliveira

== Results ==
Mixed 4x50m Freestyle Relay 20pts Finals

Seven nations took part.

Rank	Lane	Nation	Swimmers	Time	Notes
1st place, gold medalist(s)	4	Brazil	Lidia Vieira da Cruz; Daniel Xavier Mendes; Joana Maria da Silva Neves Euzébio; Samuel da Silva de Oliveira	2:20.40	AM
2nd place, silver medalist(s)	7	Mexico	Nely Edith Miranda Herrera; Vianney Marlen Trejo Delgadillo; Ángel de Jesús Camacho Ramírez; Juan Jose Gutierrez Bermudez	2:32.74	
3rd place, bronze medalist(s)	3	Italy	Giulia Ghiretti; Monica Boggioni; Luigi Beggiato; Antonio Fantin	2:39.75	
4	5	Great Britain	Maisie Summers-Newton; William Perry; Lyndon Longhorne; Ellie Challis	2:40.95	
5	2	Spain	Miguel Luque; Javier Torres; Nahia Zudaire Borrezo; Marta Fernández Infante	2:41.55	
6	6	Greece	Alexandra Stamatopoulou; Alexandros-Stylianos Lergios; Antonios Tsapatakis; Maria Tsakona	2:48.04	
7	1	Canada	Shelby Newkirk; Felix Cowan; Jordan Tucker; Jacob Brayshaw	3:51.68	

Mixed 4x100m Freestyle Relay 34pts Finals

Rank	Lane	Nation	Swimmers	Time	Notes
1st place, gold medalist(s)	4	Italy	Giulia Terzi; Xenia Francesca Palazzo; Simone Barlaam; Stefano Raimondi	4:02.53	WR
2nd place, silver medalist(s)	5	United States	McKenzie Coan; Audrey Kim; Robert Griswold; Jamal Hill	4:09.81	
3rd place, bronze medalist(s)	3	Spain	Iñigo Llopis Sanz; Sarai Gascón; Nahia Zudaire Borrezo; Ariel Enrique Schrenck Martinez	4:10.66	
4	6	Great Britain	Tully Kearney; James Hollis; Toni Shaw; Oliver Carter	4:11.52	
5	7	Canada	Felix Cowan; Shelby Newkirk; Alexander Elliot; Aurélie Rivard	4:11.82	
6	2	Brazil	Mariana Ribeiro; Cecília Kethlen Jerônimo de Araújo; Daniel Xavier Mendes; Phelipe Andrews Melo Rodrigues	4:12.06	
7	1	Australia	Rachael Watson; Rowan Crothers; William Martin; Jasmine Greenwood	4:20.06	
8	8	Argentina	Iñaki Basiloff; Daniela Giménez; Maria Jazmin Aragon Diani; Nicolas Matias Nieto	4:31.36	

Mixed 4x100m Freestyle Relay 49pts Finals

Rank	Lane	Nation	Swimmers	Time	Notes
1st place, gold medalist(s)	4	Brazil	Matheus Rheine; Douglas Matera; Lucilene da Silva Sousa; Maria Carolina Gomes Santiago	3:54.26	
2nd place, silver medalist(s)	5	Spain	José Ramón Cantero Elvira; María Delgado Nadal; Ivan Salguero Oteiza; Marian Polo López	3:59.02	
3rd place, bronze medalist(s)	6	Great Britain	Hannah Russell; Matthew Redfern; Scarlett Humphrey; Stephen Clegg	4:08.60	
4	3	Japan	Uchu Tomita; Genki Saito; Ayano Tsujiuchi; Ono Chikako	4:13.72	

Mixed 4x100m Freestyle Relay S14 Finals

Rank	Lane	Nation	Swimmers	Time	Notes
1st place, gold medalist(s)	4	Great Britain	Thomas Hamer; Bethany Firth; Jessica-Jane Applegate; Reece Dunn	3:44.03	
2nd place, silver medalist(s)	5	Australia	Jack Ireland; Benjamin Hance; Ruby Storm; Madeleine McTernan	3:48.36	
3rd place, bronze medalist(s)	3	Brazil	Gabriel Bandeira; Ana Karolina Soares de Oliveira; Débora Borges Carneiro; Joao Pedro Brutos de Oliveira	3:49.93	AM
4	2	Canada	Nicholas Bennett; Tyson MacDonald; Angela Marina; Emma Van Dyk	3:58.43	
5	6	Japan	Naohide Yamaguchi; Anku Matsuda; Kasumi Fukui; Mami Inoue	3:59.72	
