= 2023 World Para Swimming Championships – Men's 100 metre butterfly =

The men's 100m butterfly events at the 2023 World Para Swimming Championships were held at the Manchester Aquatics Centre between 31 July and 6 August.

== Medalists ==
| Event | Gold | Silver | Bronze |
|---|---|---|---|
| S8 | Alberto Amodeo; Italy | Wu Hongliang; China | Noah Jaffe; United States |
| S9 | Simone Barlaam; Italy | Timothy Hodge; Australia | Malte Braunschweig; Germany |
| S10 | Stefano Raimondi; Italy | Ihor Nimchenko; Ukraine | Col Pearse; Australia |
| S11 | Danylo Chufarov; Ukraine | Keiichi Kimura; Japan | Uchu Tomita; Japan |
| S12 | Douglas Matera; Brazil | Stephen Clegg; Great Britain | Raman Salei; Azerbaijan |
| S13 | Oleksii Virchenko; Ukraine | Alex Portal; France | Enrique José Alhambra Mollar; Spain |
| S14 | Gabriel Bandeira; Brazil | Alexander Hillhouse; Denmark | Benjamin Hance; Australia |

== Results ==
=== S8 ===
Heats

10 swimmers from eight nations took part. The swimmers with the top eight times, regardless of heat, advanced to the final.

| Rank | Heat | Lane | Name | Nation | Result | Notes |
|---|---|---|---|---|---|---|
| 1 | 2 | 5 | Alberto Amodeo | Italy | 1:03.89 | Q |
| 2 | 2 | 3 | Gabriel Cristiano Silva de Souza | Brazil | 1:04.93 | Q |
| 3 | 1 | 6 | Noah Jaffe | United States | 1:05.10 | Q |
| 4 | 1 | 3 | Michal Golus | Poland | 1:05.78 | Q |
| 5 | 2 | 6 | Iñigo Llopis Sanz | Spain | 1:06.61 | Q |
| 6 | 1 | 4 | Wu Hongliang | China | 1:06.72 | Q |
| 7 | 2 | 4 | Dimosthenis Michalentzakis | Greece | 1:07.26 | Q |
| 8 | 2 | 2 | Sergio Martos Minguet | Spain | 1:08.03 | Q |
| 9 | 1 | 5 | Luis Andrade Guillen | Mexico | 1:08.75 | |
| 10 | 1 | 2 | Philippe Vachon | Philippines | 1:08.88 | |
| 11 | 2 | 7 | Carlos Martínez Fernández | Spain | 1:10.92 | |

Final

The final was held on 2 August.

| Rank | Athlete | Nation | Result | Notes |
|---|---|---|---|---|
| 1st place, gold medalist(s) | Alberto Amodeo | Italy | 1:02.94 | |
| 2nd place, silver medalist(s) | Wu Hongliang | China | 1:03.23 | |
| 3rd place, bronze medalist(s) | Noah Jaffe | United States | 1:04.77 | |
| 4 | Gabriel Cristiano Silva de Souza | Brazil | 1:04.79 | |
| 5 | Michal Golus | Poland | 1:05.14 | |
| 6 | Iñigo Llopis Sanz | Spain | 1:05.75 | |
| 7 | Sergio Martos Minguet | Spain | 1:08.20 | |
| 8 | Dimosthenis Michalentzakis | Greece | | DSQ |

=== S9 ===
Heats

10 swimmers from seven nations took part. The swimmers with the top eight times, regardless of heat, advanced to the final.

| Rank | Heat | Lane | Name | Nation | Result | Notes |
|---|---|---|---|---|---|---|
| 1 | 2 | 4 | Simone Barlaam | Italy | 59.71 | Q |
| 2 | 1 | 4 | Timothy Hodge | Australia | 1:00.01 | Q |
| 3 | 2 | 3 | Malte Braunschweig | Germany | 1:00.96 | Q |
| 4 | 2 | 6 | Barry McClements | Ireland | 1:01.39 | Q |
| 5 | 2 | 5 | Federico Morlacchi | Italy | 1:01.73 | Q |
| 6 | 1 | 5 | José Antonio Mari | Spain | 1:02.65 | Q |
| 7 | 1 | 3 | Igor Hrehorowicz | Poland | 1:03.26 | Q |
| 8 | 1 | 6 | Brenden Hall | Australia | 1:03.34 | Q |
| 9 | 2 | 2 | Jacobo Garrido Brun | Spain | 1:04.37 | |
| 10 | 1 | 2 | Erick Tandazo | Ecuador | 1:07.94 | |

Final

The final was held on 2 August.

| Rank | Athlete | Nation | Result | Notes |
|---|---|---|---|---|
| 1st place, gold medalist(s) | Simone Barlaam | Italy | 58.25 | |
| 2nd place, silver medalist(s) | Timothy Hodge | Australia | 59.74 | |
| 3rd place, bronze medalist(s) | Malte Braunschweig | Germany | 1:00.66 | |
| 4 | Federico Morlacchi | Italy | 1:00.99 | |
| 5 | Barry McClements | Ireland | 1:01.54 | |
| 6 | José Antonio Mari | Spain | 1:02.27 | |
| 7 | Brenden Hall | Australia | 1:02.71 | |
| 8 | Igor Hrehorowicz | Poland | 1:03.33 | |

=== S10 ===
Heats

13 swimmers from ten nations took part. The swimmers with the top eight times, regardless of heat, advanced to the final.

| Rank | Heat | Lane | Name | Nation | Result | Notes |
|---|---|---|---|---|---|---|
| 1 | 1 | 4 | Ihor Nimchenko | Ukraine | 58.09 | Q |
| 2 | 2 | 4 | Stefano Raimondi | Italy | 58.48 | Q |
| 3 | 2 | 5 | Col Pearse | Australia | 58.58 | Q |
| 4 | 1 | 3 | Riccardo Menciotti | Italy | 59.24 | Q |
| 5 | 2 | 3 | William Martin | Australia | 59.39 | Q |
| 6 | 1 | 5 | Alex Saffy | Australia | 59.41 | Q |
| 7 | 2 | 6 | Florent Marais | France | 59.62 | Q |
| 8 | 1 | 2 | David Levecq | Spain | 59.90 | Q |
| 9 | 2 | 2 | Alexander Elliot | Canada | 59.96 | |
| 10 | 1 | 6 | Alan Ogorzalek | Poland | 1:00.53 | |
| 11 | 2 | 7 | Akito Minai | Japan | 1:01.22 | |
| 12 | 1 | 7 | Nicolas Matias Nieto | Argentina | 1:02.04 | |
| 13 | 2 | 1 | Tadeas Strasik | Czech Republic | 1:00.53 | |

Final

The final was held on 4 August.

| Rank | Athlete | Nation | Result | Notes |
|---|---|---|---|---|
| 1st place, gold medalist(s) | Stefano Raimondi | Italy | 54.71 | |
| 2nd place, silver medalist(s) | Ihor Nimchenko | Ukraine | 55.92 | |
| 3rd place, bronze medalist(s) | Col Pearse | Australia | 57.18 | |
| 4 | Riccardo Menciotti | Italy | 58.67 | |
| 5 | Alex Saffy | Australia | 59.18 | |
| 6 | William Martin | Australia | 59.58 | |
| 7 | Florent Marais | France | 59.92 | |
| 8 | David Levecq | Spain | 1:00.16 | |

=== S11 ===
Heats

10 swimmers from seven nations took part. The swimmers with the top eight times, regardless of heat, advanced to the final.

| Rank | Heat | Lane | Name | Nation | Result | Notes |
|---|---|---|---|---|---|---|
| 1 | 1 | 5 | Danylo Chufarov | Ukraine | 1:03.10 | Q |
| 2 | 2 | 4 | Keiichi Kimura | Japan | 1:03.66 | Q |
| 3 | 2 | 5 | Uchu Tomita | Japan | 1:04.28 | Q |
| 4 | 1 | 3 | David Kratochvil | Czech Republic | 1:05.91 | Q |
| 5 | 2 | 3 | Mykhailo Serbin | Ukraine | 1:07.29 | Q |
| 6 | 1 | 4 | Rogier Dorsman | Netherlands | 1:07.49 | Q |
| 7 | 1 | 6 | Hua Dongdong | China | 1:11.25 | Q |
| 8 | 2 | 6 | José Ramón Cantero Elvira | Spain | 1:11.47 | Q |
| 9 | 2 | 2 | Karim Gouda | Italy | 1:14.76 | |
| 10 | 1 | 2 | Mahamadou Dambelleh Jarra | Spain | 1:25.42 | |

Final

The final was held on 1 August.

| Rank | Athlete | Nation | Result | Notes |
|---|---|---|---|---|
| 1st place, gold medalist(s) | Danylo Chufarov | Ukraine | 1:00.66 | WR |
| 2nd place, silver medalist(s) | Keiichi Kimura | Japan | 1:02.47 | |
| 3rd place, bronze medalist(s) | Uchu Tomita | Japan | 1:04.00 | |
| 4 | David Kratochvil | Czech Republic | 1:05.27 | |
| 5 | Rogier Dorsman | Netherlands | 1:05.65 | |
| 6 | Mykhailo Serbin | Ukraine | 1:05.78 | |
| 7 | José Ramón Cantero Elvira | Spain | 1:10.86 | |
| 8 | Hua Dongdong | China | 1:11.66 | |

=== S12 ===
Heats

10 swimmers from eight nations took part. The swimmers with the top eight times, regardless of heat, advanced to the final.

| Rank | Heat | Lane | Name | Nation | Result | Notes |
|---|---|---|---|---|---|---|
| 1 | 2 | 4 | Stephen Clegg | United Kingdom | 58.49 | Q |
| 1 | 1 | 4 | Raman Salei | Azerbaijan | 58.72 | Q |
| 3 | 2 | 3 | Kylian Portal | France | 59.63 | Q |
| 4 | 1 | 5 | Illia Yaremenko | Ukraine | 1:00.10 | Q |
| 5 | 2 | 5 | Douglas Matera | Brazil | 1:01.43 | Q |
| 6 | 1 | 6 | Daniel Giraldo Correa | Colombia | 1:03.02 | Q |
| 7 | 2 | 2 | Borja Sanz Tamayo | Spain | 1:03.45 | Q |
| 8 | 1 | 3 | Mohammadhossein Karimi | Iran | 1:04.06 | Q |
| 9 | 2 | 6 | Alex Villarejo | Spain | 1:04.36 | |
| 10 | 2 | 7 | Vali Israfilov | Uzbekistan | 1:06.07 | |

Final

The final was held on 1 August.

| Rank | Athlete | Nation | Result | Notes |
|---|---|---|---|---|
| 1st place, gold medalist(s) | Douglas Matera | Brazil | 58.28 | |
| 2nd place, silver medalist(s) | Stephen Clegg | United Kingdom | 58.41 | |
| 3rd place, bronze medalist(s) | Raman Salei | Azerbaijan | 58.73 | |
| 4 | Kylian Portal | France | 59.50 | |
| 5 | Illia Yaremenko | Ukraine | 1:00.69 | |
| 6 | Daniel Giraldo Correa | Colombia | 1:04.02 | |
| 7 | Mohammadhossein Karimi | Iran | 1:04.20 | |
| 8 | Borja Sanz Tamayo | Spain | 1:04.58 | |

=== S13 ===
Heats

11 swimmers from seven nations took part. The swimmers with the top eight times, regardless of heat, advanced to the final.

| Rank | Heat | Lane | Name | Nation | Result | Notes |
|---|---|---|---|---|---|---|
| 1 | 2 | 4 | Oleksii Virchenko | Ukraine | 56.51 | Q |
| 1 | 1 | 4 | Alex Portal | France | 56.51 | Q |
| 3 | 2 | 3 | Muzaffar Tursunkhujaev | Uzbekistan | 58.13 | Q |
| 4 | 1 | 5 | Enrique José Alhambra Mollar | Spain | 58.31 | Q |
| 5 | 2 | 5 | Islam Aslanov | Uzbekistan | 59.13 | Q |
| 6 | 1 | 6 | Juan Ferron Gutierrez | Spain | 1:00.59 | Q |
| 7 | 2 | 2 | Nathan Hendricks | South Africa | 1:00.97 | Q |
| 8 | 1 | 3 | Kirill Pankov | Uzbekistan | 1:00.99 | Q |
| 9 | 2 | 6 | Genki Saito | Japan | 1:01.31 | |
| 10 | 2 | 7 | Philip Hebmueller | Germany | 1:02.25 | |
| 11 | 1 | 2 | Firdavsbek Musabekov | Uzbekistan | 1:02.81 | |

Final

The final was held on 31 July.

| Rank | Athlete | Nation | Result | Notes |
|---|---|---|---|---|
| 1st place, gold medalist(s) | Oleksii Virchenko | Ukraine | 55.25 | |
| 2nd place, silver medalist(s) | Alex Portal | France | 55.52 | |
| 3rd place, bronze medalist(s) | Enrique José Alhambra Mollar | Spain | 57.24 | |
| 4 | Islam Aslanov | Uzbekistan | 57.56 | |
| 5 | Muzaffar Tursunkhujaev | Uzbekistan | 57.63 | |
| 6 | Kirill Pankov | Uzbekistan | 1:00.02 | |
| 7 | Juan Ferron Gutierrez | Spain | 1:00.20 | |
| 8 | Nathan Hendricks | South Africa | 1:00.62 | |

=== S14 ===
Heats

15 swimmers from ten nations took part. The swimmers with the top eight times, regardless of heat, advanced to the final.

| Rank | Heat | Lane | Name | Nation | Result | Notes |
|---|---|---|---|---|---|---|
| 1 | 1 | 4 | Gabriel Bandeira | Brazil | 56.16 | Q |
| 2 | 2 | 4 | Benjamin Hance | Australia | 56.23 | Q |
| 3 | 2 | 5 | Alexander Hillhouse | Denmark | 56.28 | Q |
| 4 | 2 | 2 | William Ellard | Spain | 57.27 | Q |
| 5 | 2 | 7 | Cho Won-sang | South Korea | 57.98 | Q |
| 6 | 1 | 5 | Lautaro Maidana | Spain | 58.03 | Q |
| 7 | 2 | 3 | Lawrence Sapp | South Africa | 58.10 | Q |
| 8 | 1 | 1 | Dmytro Vanzenko | Ukraine | 58.33 | Q |
| 9 | 2 | 6 | Anku Matsuda | Japan | 58.40 | |
| 10 | 1 | 6 | Nicholas Bennett | Canada | 58.84 | |
| 11 | 2 | 1 | Ricky Betar | Australia | 58.93 | |
| 12 | 1 | 7 | Lee In-kook | South Korea | 59.08 | |
| 13 | 2 | 8 | Cameron Vearncombe | United Kingdom | 59.24 | |
| 14 | 1 | 2 | Shunya Murakami | Japan | 59.84 | |
| | 1 | 3 | Naohide Yamaguchi | Japan | | DSQ |

Final

The final was held on 6 August.

| Rank | Athlete | Nation | Result | Notes |
|---|---|---|---|---|
| 1st place, gold medalist(s) | Gabriel Bandeira | Brazil | 54.64 | |
| 2nd place, silver medalist(s) | Alexander Hillhouse | Denmark | 55.48 | |
| 3rd place, bronze medalist(s) | Benjamin Hance | Australia | 55.90 | OC |
| 4 | William Ellard | United Kingdom | 56.67 | |
| 5 | Lautaro Maidana | Argentina | 57.60 | |
| 6 | Dmytro Vanzenko | Ukraine | 57.62 | |
| 7 | Lawrence Sapp | United States | 58.09 | |
| 8 | Cho Won-sang | South Korea | 58.39 | |
