= Conor Morrison =

Conor Morrison may refer to:

- Conor Morrison (Gaelic footballer) (born c. 1996), Donegal player
- Conor Morrison (ice hockey) (born 1989), Augsburger Panther player
- Conner Morrison (swimmer), British swimmer who competed in the 2018 World Para Swimming European Championships – Men's 100 metres breaststroke
