= Swimming at the 2020 Summer Paralympics – Women's 100 metre breaststroke SB12 =

Women's 100 metre breaststroke SB12 at the XVI Paralympic Games
- Venue: Tokyo Aquatics Centre
- Dates: 1 September 2021
- Competitors: 8 from 6 nations

Medalists
1st place, gold medalist(s)		Maria Carolina Gomes Santiago	Brazil
2nd place, silver medalist(s)		Daria Lukianenko	RPC
3rd place, bronze medalist(s)		Yaryna Matlo	Ukraine

The Women's 100 metre breaststroke SB12 event at the 2020 Paralympic Games took place on 1 September 2021, at the Tokyo Aquatics Centre.

== Final ==
Rank	Lane	Name	Nationality	Time	Notes
1st place, gold medalist(s)	4	Maria Carolina Gomes Santiago	Brazil	1:14.89	PR
2nd place, silver medalist(s)	5	Daria Lukianenko	RPC	1:17.55	
3rd place, bronze medalist(s)	3	Yaryna Matlo	Ukraine	1:20.31	
4	6	Sophie Jin Wen Soon	Singapore	1:29.52	
5	1	Lucilene da Silva Sousa	Brazil	1:30.25	
6	2	Belkis Dayanara Mota Echarry	Venezuela	1:30.37	
7	7	Aliya Rakhimbekova	Kazakhstan	1:31.31	
