= 2022 World Para Swimming Championships – Men's 200 metre freestyle =

The men's 50m freestyle events at the 2022 World Para Swimming Championships were held at the Penteada Olympic Swimming Complex in Madeira between 12 and 18 June.

== Medalists ==
Event	Gold	Silver	Bronze
S1	Francesco Bettella; Italy	Dimitrios Karypidis; Greece	Jose Ronaldo da Silva; Brazil
S2	Gabriel Araújo; Brazil	Alberto Abarza; Chile	Kamil Otowski; Poland
S3	Jesús Hernández Hernández; Mexico	Denys Ostapchenko; Ukraine	Vincenzo Boni; Italy
S4	Ami Omer Dadaon; Israel	Cameron Leslie; New Zealand	Ángel de Jesús Camacho Ramírez; Mexico
S5	Francesco Bocciardo; Italy	Antoni Ponce Bertran; Spain	Koral Berkin Kutlu; Turkey
S14	Gabriel Bandeira; Brazil	Nicholas Bennett; Canada	Benjamin Hance; Australia

== Results ==
=== S1 ===
Final

Four swimmers from three nations took part.

Rank	Athlete	Nation	Result	Notes
1st place, gold medalist(s)	Francesco Bettella	Italy	5:25.63	
2nd place, silver medalist(s)	Dimitrios Karypidis	Greece	6:15.18	
3rd place, bronze medalist(s)	Jose Ronaldo da Silva	Brazil	6:52.23	
4	Nikolaos Kontou	Greece	8:22.42	

=== S14 ===
Heats

10 swimmers from five nations took part. The swimmers with the top eight times, regardless of heat, advanced to the final.

Rank	Heat	Lane	Name	Nation	Result	Notes
1	1	3	Benjamin Hance	Australia	1:58.00	Q
2	1	1	Jack Ireland	Australia	1:58.12	Q
3	1	6	Nicholas Bennett	Canada	1:58.18	Q
4	1	5	Gabriel Bandeira	Brazil	1:59.43	Q
5	1	7	Thomas Hamer	United Kingdom	2:00.48	Q
6	1	8	João Pedro Brutos de Oliveira	Brazil	2:01.13	Q
7	1	4	Reece Dunn	United Kingdom	2:01.77	Q
8	1	2	Jordan Catchpole	United Kingdom	2:02.67	Q
9	1	9	Dmytro Vanzenko	Ukraine	2:03.34	
10	1	0	Jake Michel	Australia	2:06.98	

Final

The final was held on 12 June 2022.

Rank	Athlete	Nation	Result	Notes
1st place, gold medalist(s)	Gabriel Bandeira	Brazil	1:52.42	CR
2nd place, silver medalist(s)	Nicholas Bennett	Canada	1:54.41	
3rd place, bronze medalist(s)	Benjamin Hance	Australia	1:56.14	
4	Jack Ireland	Australia	1:56.77	
5	Thomas Hamer	Japan	1:58.40	
6	Reece Dunn	United Kingdom	1:59.51	
7	João Pedro Brutos de Oliveira	Brazil	1:59.81	
8	Jordan Catchpole	United Kingdom	2:00.39	
