= 2019 World Para Swimming Championships – Freestyle relays =

Championship event

The freestyle relay events at the 2019 World Para Swimming Championships were held in the London Aquatics Centre at the Queen Elizabeth Olympic Park in London between 9–15 September.

== Medalists ==
* - denotes the swimmer only swam in the heats but received a medal.

Event	Gold	Silver	Bronze
Men's 4 × 100 m freestyle relay 34pts	Italy; Stefano Raimondi; Antonio Fantin; Federico Morlacchi; Simone Barlaam	Ukraine; Dmytro Vanzenko; Andrii Trusov; Bohdan Hrynenko; Maksym Krypak	Australia; Matt Levy; Ben Popham; Timothy Disken; Rowan Crothers
Women's 4 × 100 m freestyle relay 34pts	Great Britain; Stephanie Millward; Brock Whiston; Toni Shaw; Alice Tai	United States; McKenzie Coan; Elizabeth Smith; Jessica Long; Mikaela Jenkins	Canada; Abi Tripp; Katarina Roxon; Aurelie Rivard; Tess Routliffe
Mixed 4x50m freestyle relay 20pts	China; Wang Jingang; Wang Lichao; Zhang Li * Peng Qiuping; Liu Benying * Lu Weiyuan *	Italy; Arjola Trimi; Francesco Bocciardo; Arianna Talamona; Antonio Fantin	Russia; Nataliia Butkova; Ani Palian; Roman Zhdanov; Artur Kubasov; Dmitrii Cherniaev * Anastasia Diodorova *
Mixed 4 × 100 m freestyle relay 49pts	Ukraine; Maryna Piddubna; Kyrylo Garashchenko; Anna Stetsenko; Yaroslav Denysenko; Sergii Klippert * Yaryna Matlo * Kateryna Tkachuk * Maksym Veraksa *	Brazil; Wendell Belarmino Pereira; Maria Carolina Gomes Santiago; Lucilene Da Silva Sousa; Carlos Farrenberg; Guilherme Batista Silva * Matheus Rheine *	Russia; Kirill Belousov; Roman Makarov; Anna Krivshina; Daria Pikalova; Maksim Koval * Mariia Latritskaia * Artur Saifutdinov *
Mixed 4 × 100 m freestyle relay S14	Great Britain; Thomas Hamer; Bethany Firth; Jessica-Jane Applegate; Reece Dunn	Russia; Mikhail Kuliabin; Viacheslav Emeliantsev; Valeriia Shabalina; Elizaveta Barbatina	Australia; Ricky Betar; Taylor Corry; Ruby Storm; Liam Schluter
