= Swimming at the 2020 Summer Paralympics – Women's 100 metre freestyle S12 =

Women's 100 metre freestyle S12 at the XVI Paralympic Games
- Venue: Tokyo Aquatics Centre
- Dates: 31 August 2021
- Competitors: 10 from 9 nations

Medalists
1st place, gold medalist(s)		Maria Carolina Gomes Santiago	Brazil
2nd place, silver medalist(s)		Daria Pikalova	RPC
3rd place, bronze medalist(s)		Hannah Russell	Great Britain

The Women's 100 metre freestyle S12 event at the 2020 Paralympic Games took place on 31 August 2021, at the Tokyo Aquatics Centre.

== Heats ==
The swimmers with the top eight times, regardless of heat, advanced to the final.

Rank	Heat	Lane	Name	Nationality	Time	Notes
1	1	4	Daria Pikalova	RPC	59.48	Q
2	1	3	Lucilene da Silva Sousa	Brazil	1:01.61	Q
3	2	4	Maria Carolina Gomes Santiago	Brazil	1:01.79	Q
4	2	3	Hannah Russell	Great Britain	1:01.81	Q
5	1	5	María Delgado Nadal	Spain	1:02.05	Q
6	2	5	Alessia Berra	Italy	1:04.29	Q
7	2	6	Belkis Dayanara Mota Echarry	Venezuela	1:07.53	Q
8	2	2	Yaryna Matlo	Ukraine	1:09.03	Q
9	1	6	Analuz Pellitero	Argentina	1:09.11	
10	1	2	Aliya Rakhimbekova	Kazakhstan	1:12.45	

== Final ==
100m freestyle final
Rank	Lane	Name	Nationality	Time	Notes
1st place, gold medalist(s)	3	Maria Carolina Gomes Santiago	Brazil	59.01	
2nd place, silver medalist(s)	4	Daria Pikalova	RPC	59.13	
3rd place, bronze medalist(s)	6	Hannah Russell	Great Britain	1:00.25	
4	7	Alessia Berra	Italy	1:00.68	
5	2	María Delgado Nadal	Spain	1:01.49	
6	5	Lucilene da Silva Sousa	Brazil	1:02.42	
7	1	Belkis Dayanara Mota Echarry	Venezuela	1:07.60	
8	8	Yaryna Matlo	Ukraine	1:07.78	
