= 2020 World Para Swimming European Open Championships – Women's 400 metre freestyle =

The women's 400m freestyle events at the 2020 World Para Swimming European Championships were held at the Penteada Olympic Pools Complex.

== Medalists ==
Event	Gold	Silver	Bronze
S6	Nora Meister; Switzerland	Yelyzaveta Mereshko; Ukraine	Verena Schott; Germany
S7	Denise Grahl; Germany	Erel Halevi; Israel	Agnes Kramer; Sweden
S8	Xenia Palazzo; Italy	Nahia Zudaire Borrezo; Spain	Mira Jeanne Maack; Germany
S9	Zsofia Konkoly; Hungary	Nuria Marques Soto; Spain	Yuliya Gordiychuk; Israel
S10	Bianka Pap; Hungary	Oliwia Jablonska; Poland	Anaelle Roulet; France
S13	Anna Stetsenko; Ukraine	Carlotta Gilli; Italy	Maria Delgado Nadal; Spain

== Results ==
=== S7 ===
Final

Rank	Name	Nationality	Time	Notes
1st place, gold medalist(s)	Denise Grahl	Germany	5:37.07	
2nd place, silver medalist(s)	Erel Halevi	Israel	5:38.24	
3rd place, bronze medalist(s)	Agnes Kramer	Sweden	6:00.98	
4	Nil Sahin	Turkey	6:12.67	
5	Ida Andersson Wulf	Sweden	6:15.03	
6	Nicola St Clair Maitland	Sweden	6:22.79	
7	Katherina Roesler	Germany	6:41.15	

=== S8 ===
Final

Rank	Name	Nationality	Time	Notes
1st place, gold medalist(s)	Xenia Francesca Palazzo	Italy	4:54.62	
2nd place, silver medalist(s)	Nahia Zudaire Borrezo	Spain	5:06.16	
3rd place, bronze medalist(s)	Mira Jeanne Maack	Germany	5:10.73	
4	Amalie Vinther	Denmark	5:20.62	
5	Vendula Duskova	Czech Republic	5:21.46	
6	Jade Le Bris	France	5:26.70	
7	Mariia Pavlova	Russia	5:30.76	
