= Matheus Rheine =

Brazilian para swimmer (born 1992)

Personal information
- Full name: Matheus Rheine Corrêa de Souza
- Born: 10 December 1992 (age 33) Brusque, Santa Catarina, Brazil

Sport
- Sport: Para swimming
- Disability class: S11
Medal record
Men's para swimming
Representing Brazil
Paralympic Games
Silver medal – second place	2024 Paris	Mixed 4x100 m freestyle relay 49pts
Bronze medal – third place	2016 Rio de Janeiro	400 m freestyle S11
World Championships
Gold medal – first place	2022 Madeira	Mixed 4×100 m freestyle relay 49pts
Gold medal – first place	2023 Manchester	Mixed 4×100 m freestyle relay 49pts
Silver medal – second place	2013 Montreal	400 m freestyle S11
Silver medal – second place	2015 Glasgow	100 m freestyle S11
Silver medal – second place	2015 Glasgow	400 m freestyle S11
Silver medal – second place	2019 London	Mixed 4×100 m freestyle relay 49pts
Silver medal – second place	2025 Singapore	Mixed 4×100 m freestyle relay 49pts
Bronze medal – third place	2013 Montreal	100 m freestyle S11
Bronze medal – third place	2023 Manchester	Mixed 4×100 m medley relay 49pts
Parapan American Games
Gold medal – first place	2015 Toronto	50 m freestyle S11
Gold medal – first place	2015 Toronto	100 m freestyle S11
Gold medal – first place	2019 Lima	400 m freestyle S11
Gold medal – first place	2023 Santiago	400 m freestyle S11
Gold medal – first place	2023 Santiago	Mixed 4×100 m freestyle relay 49pts
Silver medal – second place	2011 Guadalajara	50 m freestyle S11
Silver medal – second place	2019 Lima	50 m freestyle S11
Silver medal – second place	2019 Lima	100 m freestyle S11
Silver medal – second place	2023 Santiago	50 m freestyle S11

Matheus Rheine Corrêa de Souza (born 10 December 1992) is a Brazilian para swimmer.

== Career ==
Rheine represented Brazil at the 2016 Summer Paralympics and won a bronze medal in the 400 metre freestyle S11 event.

Rheine represented Brazil at the 2024 Summer Paralympics and won a silver medal in the mixed 4x100 metre freestyle relay 49pts event.
