= Swimming at the 2020 Summer Paralympics – Women's 400 metre freestyle S8 =

Women's 400 metre freestyle S8 at the XVI Paralympic Games
- Venue: Tokyo Aquatics Centre
- Dates: 31 August 2021
- Competitors: 8 from 7 nations
- Winning time: 4:42.39

Medalists
1st place, gold medalist(s)		Morgan Stickney	United States
2nd place, silver medalist(s)		Jessica Long	United States
3rd place, bronze medalist(s)		Xenia Francesca Palazzo	Italy

The Women's 400 metre freestyle S8 event at the 2020 Paralympic Games took place on 31 August 2021, at the Tokyo Aquatics Centre.

== Final ==
Rank	Lane	Name	Nationality	Time	Notes
1st place, gold medalist(s)	4	Morgan Stickney	United States	4:42.39	
2nd place, silver medalist(s)	5	Jessica Long	United States	4:43.41	
3rd place, bronze medalist(s)	3	Xenia Francesca Palazzo	Italy	4:56.79	
4	6	Nahia Zudaire Borrezo	Spain	5:07.67	
5	2	Mira Jeanne Maack	Germany	5:12.82	
6	8	Vendula Dušková	Czech Republic	5:20.71	
7	7	Amalie Vinther	Denmark	5:22.44	
8	1	Mariia Pavlova	RPC	6:00.36	
