= Enrique José Alhambra Mollar =

Spanish Paralympic swimmer

Enrique Alhambra
Personal information
- Full name: Enrique José Alhambra Mollar
- Born: 9 June 2004 (age 22)

Sport
- Sport: Para swimming
- Disability class: S13
Medal record
Men's para swimming
Representing Spain
Paralympic Games
Bronze medal – third place	2024 Paris	100 m butterfly S13
Bronze medal – third place	2024 Paris	Mixed 4×100 m freestyle relay 49pts
World Championships
Gold medal – first place	2025 Singapore	Mixed 4×100 m freestyle relay (49pts)
Silver medal – second place	2022 Madeira	Mixed 4×100 m medley relay (49 pts)
Silver medal – second place	2023 Manchester	100 m backstroke S13
Silver medal – second place	2023 Manchester	Mixed 4×100 m medley relay (49 pts)
Bronze medal – third place	2023 Manchester	100 m butterfly S13
European Championships
Silver medal – second place	2026 Kocaeli	100 m butterfly S13

Enrique José Alhambra Mollar (Note: In this Spanish name, the first or paternal surname is Alhambra and the second or maternal family name is Mollar.) (born 9 June 2004) is a Spanish swimmer, who won bronze in the 100 m butterfly S13 at the 2024 Summer Paralympics in Paris.
