= Swimming at the 2022 Commonwealth Games – Men's 200 metre freestyle S14 =

Men's 200 metre freestyle S14 at the 2022 Commonwealth Games
- Venue: Sandwell Aquatics Centre
- Dates: 3 August 2022
- Competitors: 8 from 4 nations
- Winning time: 1:54.97

Medalists
gold medal	Nicholas Bennett	Canada
silver medal	Benjamin Hance	Australia
bronze medal	Jack Ireland	Australia

The men's 200 metre freestyle S14 event at the 2022 Commonwealth Games was held on 3 August at the Sandwell Aquatics Centre.

== Schedule ==
The schedule is as follows:

All times are British Summer Time (UTC+1)

Date	Time	Round
Wednesday 3 August 2022	19:22	Final

== Results ==
=== Final ===
Rank	Lane	Name	Nationality	Time	Notes
1st place, gold medalist(s)	3	Nicholas Bennett	Canada	1:54.97	GR
2nd place, silver medalist(s)	5	Benjamin Hance	Australia	1:55.50	
3rd place, bronze medalist(s)	8	Jack Ireland	Australia	1:56.15	
4	2	Jordan Catchpole	England	1:56.37	
5	4	Reece Dunn	England	1:56.42	
6	7	Thomas Hamer	England	1:57.99	
7	1	Dylan Broom	Wales	1:58.65	
8	6	Liam Schluter	Australia	1:59.17	
