= Swimming at the 2020 Summer Paralympics – Men's 100 metre backstroke S10 =

Men's 100 metre backstroke S10 at the XVI Paralympic Games
- Venue: Tokyo Aquatics Centre
- Dates: 2 September 2021
- Competitors: 10 from 7 nations

Medalists
1st place, gold medalist(s)		Maksym Krypak	Ukraine
2nd place, silver medalist(s)		Stefano Raimondi	Italy
3rd place, bronze medalist(s)		Florent Marais	France

The Men's 100 metre backstroke S10 event at the 2020 Paralympic Games took place on 2 September 2021, at the Tokyo Aquatics Centre.

== Heats ==
The swimmers with the top eight times, regardless of heat, advanced to the final.

Rank	Heat	Lane	Name	Nationality	Time	Notes
1	2	4	Maksym Krypak	Ukraine	1:00.07	Q
2	1	4	Stefano Raimondi	Italy	1:01.58	Q
3	1	3	Querijn Hensen	Netherlands	1:01.87	Q
4	1	5	Bas Takken	Netherlands	1:01.89	Q
5	2	3	Florent Marais	France	1:01.92	Q
6	2	5	Riccardo Menciotti	Italy	1:03.05	Q
7	2	6	Stanislav Popov	Ukraine	1:03.92	Q
8	2	2	Col Pearse	Australia	1:04.03	Q
9	1	6	Kardo Ploomipuu	Estonia	1:06.90	
10	1	2	Artem Isaev	RPC	1:07.92	

== Final ==
Rank	Lane	Name	Nationality	Time	Notes
1st place, gold medalist(s)	4	Maksym Krypak	Ukraine	57.19	WR
2nd place, silver medalist(s)	5	Stefano Raimondi	Italy	59.36	
3rd place, bronze medalist(s)	2	Florent Marais	France	1.01.30	
4	7	Riccardo Menciotti	Italy	1.01.46	
5	6	Bas Takken	Netherlands	1.01.52	
6	3	Querijn Hensen	Netherlands	1.02.19	
7	1	Stanislav Popov	Ukraine	1.03.54	
8	8	Col Pearse	Australia	1.04.41	
