= Swimming at the 2016 Summer Paralympics – Men's 400 metre freestyle S7 =

Men's 400 metre freestyle S7 at the XV Paralympic Games
- Venue: Olympic Aquatics Stadium
- Dates: 14 September 2016
- Competitors: 12 from 10 nations

Medalists
1st place, gold medalist(s)		Michael Jones	Great Britain
2nd place, silver medalist(s)		Jonathan Fox	Great Britain
3rd place, bronze medalist(s)		Andreas Skaar Bjornstad	Norway

The Men's 400 metre freestyle S7 event at the 2016 Paralympic Games took place on 14 September 2016, at the Olympic Aquatics Stadium. Two heats were held. The swimmers with the eight fastest times advanced to the final.

== Heats ==
=== Heat 1 ===
9:38 14 September 2016:

Rank	Lane	Name	Nationality	Time	Notes
1	4	Jonathan Fox	Great Britain	4:51.10	Q
2	5	Marian Kvasnytsia	Ukraine	4:58.39	Q
3	3	Carlos Serrano Zárate	Colombia	5:02.27	Q
4	6	Valerio Taras	Italy	5:17.42	
5	2	Hannes Schuermann	Germany	5:26.39	
6	7	Dino Sinovcic	Croatia	5:36.83	

=== Heat 2 ===
9:46 14 September 2016:

Rank	Lane	Name	Nationality	Time	Notes
1	4	Michael Jones	Great Britain	4:58.50	Q
2	5	Andreas Skaar Bjornstad	Norway	4:59.23	Q
3	3	Facundo Arregui	Argentina	4:59.35	Q
4	6	Antoni Ponce Bertran	Spain	5:09.31	Q
5	7	Andriy Kozlenko	Ukraine	5:15.94	Q
6	2	Italo Pereira	Brazil	5:18.10	

== Final ==
17:44 14 September 2016:

Rank	Lane	Name	Nationality	Time	Notes
1st place, gold medalist(s)	3	Michael Jones	Great Britain	4:45.78	
2nd place, silver medalist(s)	4	Jonathan Fox	Great Britain	4:49.00	
3rd place, bronze medalist(s)	6	Andreas Skaar Bjornstad	Norway	4:53.61	
4	7	Carlos Serrano Zárate	Colombia	4:57.29	
5	2	Facundo Arregui	Argentina	4:57.40	
6	5	Marian Kvasnytsia	Ukraine	4:57.54	
7	1	Antoni Ponce Bertran	Spain	5:09.43	
8	8	Andriy Kozlenko	Ukraine	5:19.60	
