= Wu Hongliang =

Chinese Paralympic swimmer

Personal information
- Born: 2 August 1994 (age 31)
- Home town: Tongren, China

Sport
- Sport: Paralympic swimming
- Disability class: S8
Medal record
Men's paralympic swimming
Representing China
Paralympic Games
Silver medal – second place	2024 Paris	100 m butterfly S8
World Championships
Silver medal – second place	2023 Manchester	100 m butterfly S8

Wu Hongliang (born 2 August 1994) is a Chinese Paralympic swimmer. He represented China at the 2024 Summer Paralympics.

== Career ==
Wu competed at the 2023 World Para Swimming Championships and won a silver medal in the 100 metre butterfly S8 event.

Wu represented China at the 2024 Summer Paralympics and won a silver medal in the 100 metre butterfly S8 event.
