= Lucilene da Silva Sousa =

Brazilian para-swimmer (born 2000)

Personal information
- Born: 5 April 2000 (age 26) São Miguel do Guamá, Pará, Brazil
- Height: 1.60 m (5 ft 3 in)

Sport
- Country: Brazil
- Sport: Para swimming
- Disability: Optic nerve atrophy
- Disability class: S12
Medal record
Para swimming
Representing Brazil
Paralympic Games
Silver medal – second place	2020 Tokyo	Mixed 4×100 m freestyle relay 49pts
Silver medal – second place	2024 Paris	Mixed 4×100 m freestyle relay 49pts
World Championships
Gold medal – first place	2022 Madeira	Mixed 4×100m freestyle relay 49pts
Gold medal – first place	2022 Madeira	Mixed 4x100m medley relay 49pts
Gold medal – first place	2023 Manchester	Mixed 4×100 m medley relay
Gold medal – first place	2025 Singapore	Mixed 4×100 m medley relay 49pts
Silver medal – second place	2019 London	Mixed 4x100m freestyle relay 49pts
Silver medal – second place	2025 Singapore	Mixed 4×100 m freestyle relay 49pts
Bronze medal – third place	2022 Madeira	50m freestyle S12
Bronze medal – third place	2023 Manchester	100m freestyle S12
Bronze medal – third place	2023 Manchester	Mixed 4×100 m medley relay S14
Bronze medal – third place	2025 Singapore	100 m freestyle S12
Parapan American Games
Silver medal – second place	2019 Lima	50m freestyle S12
Silver medal – second place	2019 Lima	100m freestyle S12
Silver medal – second place	2019 Lima	400m freestyle S12

Lucilene da Silva Sousa (born 5 April 2000) is a Brazilian para swimmer.

== Early life ==
Sousa is from São Miguel do Guamá, Pará. She was born with optic nerve atrophy, which resulted in low vision. Before swimming, she practiced goalball under the influence of her older brother, Josemárcio, and won the gold medal at the 2017 Youth Parapan American Games, held in São Paulo.

== Career ==
At the 2019 Parapan American Games, Sousa won the silver medal in the 400-meter freestyle class S13, the 50-meter freestyle and 100-meter freestyle.

Sousa's debut at the World Para Swimming Championships took place in the 2019 edition, held in London, United Kingdom, where she won a silver medal in the 4 × 100 m freestyle relay, 49 points, as part of a team also formed by Wendell Belarmino, Carolina Santiago and Carlos Farrenberg. They finished with a time of 3:53:17 and set a new record for the Americas. Sousa herself also finished in 6th place in the 100m freestyle (S12) and 8th place in the 50m freestyle (S12).

At the 2020 Summer Paralympics, held between August and September 2021 in Tokyo, Sousa won the silver medal in the mixed 4 × 100 m freestyle relay 49 points, having formed a team with Wendell Belarmino, Douglas Matera and Carolina Santiago. They recorded a time of 3:54:95.

In June 2022, at the World Para Swimming Championships held in Madeira, Portugal, Sousa won bronze in the 50-metre freestyle class S12. She secured gold in the 4 × 100 m medley relay 49 points forming a team with Carolina Santiago, José Luíz Perdigão and Guilherme Batista, where they clocked a time of 4:33:30, just 22 hundredths ahead of the second-placed team, Spain. In the 4 × 100 m mixed freestyle relay 49 points, she formed a team with Matheus Rheine, Douglas Matera and Carolina Santiago, and was, again, a gold medalist with a time of 3:54:26. In addition, she finished 4th in the 100-metre butterfly, 5th in the 100-metre freestyle and 8th in the 100-metre butterfly S13. In the 2023 edition of the world championship, held in Manchester, United Kingdom, Sousa won the bronze medal in the 100-metre freestyle with a time of 1:01:54. She competed in the 4×100 freestyle mixed relay 49 points alongside Carolina Santiago, Matheus Rheine and Douglas Matera. They recorded a time of 3:56:03 and won gold.
