= Andreas Skår Bjørnstad =

Norwegian Paralympic swimmer

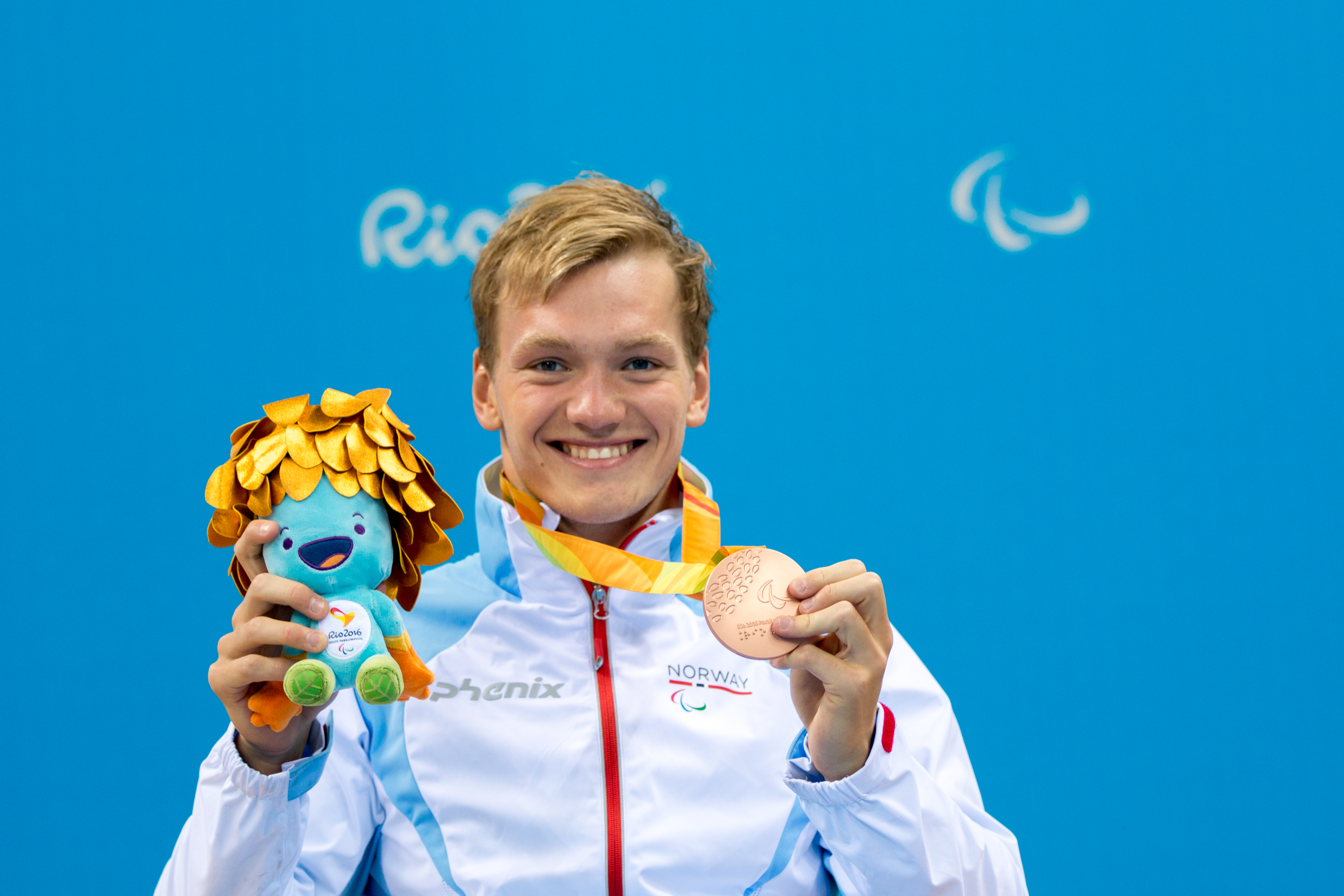
- Bjørnstad in 2016

Personal information
- Born: 14 April 1997 (age 29)

Sport
- Sport: Swimming
- Classifications: S7
Medal record
Men's para swimming
Representing Norway
Paralympic Games
Bronze medal – third place	2016 Rio de Janeiro	400 m freestyle S7
World Championships
Silver medal – second place	2015 Glasgow	400 m freestyle S7
European Championships
Silver medal – second place	2014 Eindhoven	400 m freestyle S7
Silver medal – second place	2018 Dublin	100 m breaststroke SB6
Bronze medal – third place	2018 Dublin	400 m freestyle S7

Andreas Skår Bjørnstad (born 14 April 1997), also written as Andreas Skaar Bjornstad, is a Norwegian Paralympic swimmer with cerebral palsy.

He represented Norway at the 2016 Summer Paralympics in Rio de Janeiro, Brazil, and won the bronze medal in the men's 400 metres freestyle S7 event. He qualified to represent Norway at the 2020 Summer Paralympics held in Tokyo, Japan.
