= Nahia Zudaire Borrezo =

Spanish Paralympic swimmer

Nahia Zudaire
Personal information
- Full name: Nahia Zudaire Borrezo
- Born: 10 May 2004 (age 22) Usurbil, Spain

Sport
- Country: Spain
- Sport: Paralympic swimming
- Disability: Coarctation of the aorta
- Disability class: S8, SM8
- Events: Freestyle, Medley, Butterfly
Medal record
Paralympic swimming
Representing Spain
World Championships
Bronze medal – third place	2022 Madeira	400m freestyle S8
Bronze medal – third place	2022 Madeira	4x50m mixed medley relay 20pts
Bronze medal – third place	2022 Madeira	4x100m mixed freestyle relay 34pts
Bronze medal – third place	2025 Singapore	400 m freestyle S8
Bronze medal – third place	2025 Singapore	100 m breaststroke SB7
European Championships
Silver medal – second place	2021 Funchal	400m freestyle S8
Silver medal – second place	2026 Kocaeli	400m freestyle S8
Silver medal – second place	2026 Kocaeli	100m freestyle S8
Bronze medal – third place	2021 Funchal	100m freestyle S8

Nahia Zudaire Borrezo (born 10 May 2004) is a Spanish Paralympic swimmer who competes in international swimming competitions. She is a four-time World bronze medalist and European silver medalist in freestyle swimming. She competed at the 2020 Summer Paralympics where she finished fourth place in the 400m freestyle S8 and 100m butterfly S8.

== Personal life ==
Zudaire was diagnosed with coarctation of the aorta aged fifteen months which affects blood supply to not reach a part of her body properly. She has spinal ischemia and paraparesis in her lower limbs. She started swimming at six years old as part of her rehabilitation.
