= 2018 World Para Swimming European Championships – 4 × 100 metres freestyle relay =

The 4 × 100 metres freestyle relay at the 2018 World Para Swimming European Championships was held at the National Aquatic Centre in Dublin from 13 to 19 August. 2 classification finals are held in all over this event.

== Points calculation ==
Points are calculated by adding together the numerical classifications of the swimmers. If a swimmer has two different numerical classifications depending on which stoke they are employing (for example a swimmer may be classified as S9, but SB8 for breaststroke and SM8 for medley), the relevant points value will be for the classification in the stroke being used in the relay.

The 20 point relay is restricted to a combined total of 20 points, and is generally composed of a combination of swimmers from the more impaired categories, typically the S2, 3, 4, 5 and 6 categories. No 20 point relay was held in this distance in 2018.

The 34 point relay is restricted to a combined total of 34 points, and are generally composed of a combination of swimmers from the less physically impaired categories, typically the S7, 8, 9 and 10 categories, although an S5 swimmer, Antonio Fantin, swam for Italy, allowing that team to include three less impaired swimmers (two S10's and an S9).

The 49 point relay is restricted to a combined total of 49 points, and is generally composed of a combination of swimmers from S11, S12, S13 (visual impairment) and S14 (intellectual disability) categories.

== Medalists ==
Event	Gold		Silver		Bronze	
Men's 4 × 100 freestyle 34 pts	Italy (ITA); Stefano Raimondi (S10); Riccardo Menciotti (S10); Simone Barlaam (S9); Antonio Fantin (S5)	3:50.86	Ukraine (UKR); Denys Dubrov (S10); Ievgenii Bogodaiko (S7); Marian Kvasnytsia (S7); Maksym Krypak (S10)	3:52.92	Spain (ESP); Inigo Llopis Sanz (S8); A.E. Schrenk M. (S9); S.S. Martos Minguet (S8); Jose Antonio Mari Alcaraz (S9)	4:00.75
Mixed 4 × 100 freestyle 49 pts	Ukraine (UKR); Maryna Piddubna; Iaroslav Denysenko; Kyrylo Garshchenko; Anna Stetsenko	3:54.70 WR	Spain (ESP); Israel Oliver; Maria Delgado Nadal; Ivan Salguero Oteiza; Marian Polo Lopez	4:03.58	Italy (ITA); Salvatore Urso; Alessia Berra; Carlotta Gilli; Fabrizio Sottile	4:03.86

== See also ==
- List of IPC world records in swimming
