= Noah Jaffe =

American Paralympic swimmer (born 2003)

Personal information
- Born: July 18, 2003 (age 22) Carlsbad, California, U.S.

Sport
- Sport: Paralympic swimming
- Disability class: S8, SB8, SM8
Medal record
Men's paralympic swimming
Representing United States
Paralympic Games
Silver medal – second place	2024 Paris	100 m freestyle S8
Bronze medal – third place	2024 Paris	Mixed 4×100 m freestyle relay 34pts
World Championships
Gold medal – first place	2023 Manchester	100 m freestyle S8
Silver medal – second place	2023 Manchester	50 m freestyle S8
Bronze medal – third place	2023 Manchester	400 m freestyle S8
Bronze medal – third place	2023 Manchester	100 m butterfly S8
Bronze medal – third place	2025 Singapore	50 m freestyle S8

Noah Jaffe (born July 18, 2003) is an American Paralympic swimmer who specializes in freestyle and butterfly events.

== Career ==
Jaffe made his international debut for the United States at the 2022 Duel in the Pool in Sydney, Australia where he participated in para swimming events, along with Jamal Hill, McKenzie Coan, and Elizabeth Smith.

On April 29, 2023, Jaffe was named to the roster to represent the United States at the 2023 World Para Swimming Championships in Manchester, England. On the first day of competition he won a bronze medal in the 400 m freestyle S8 event. On the third day he won a bronze medal in the 100 m butterfly S8 event. On the fourth day he won a gold medal in the 100 m freestyle S8 event and set an Americas record. On the fifth day he won a silver medal in the 50 m freestyle S8 event.

On June 30, 2024, Jaffe was named to Team USA's roster to compete at the 2024 Summer Paralympics.
