= Florent Marais =

French Paralympic swimmer (born 2000)

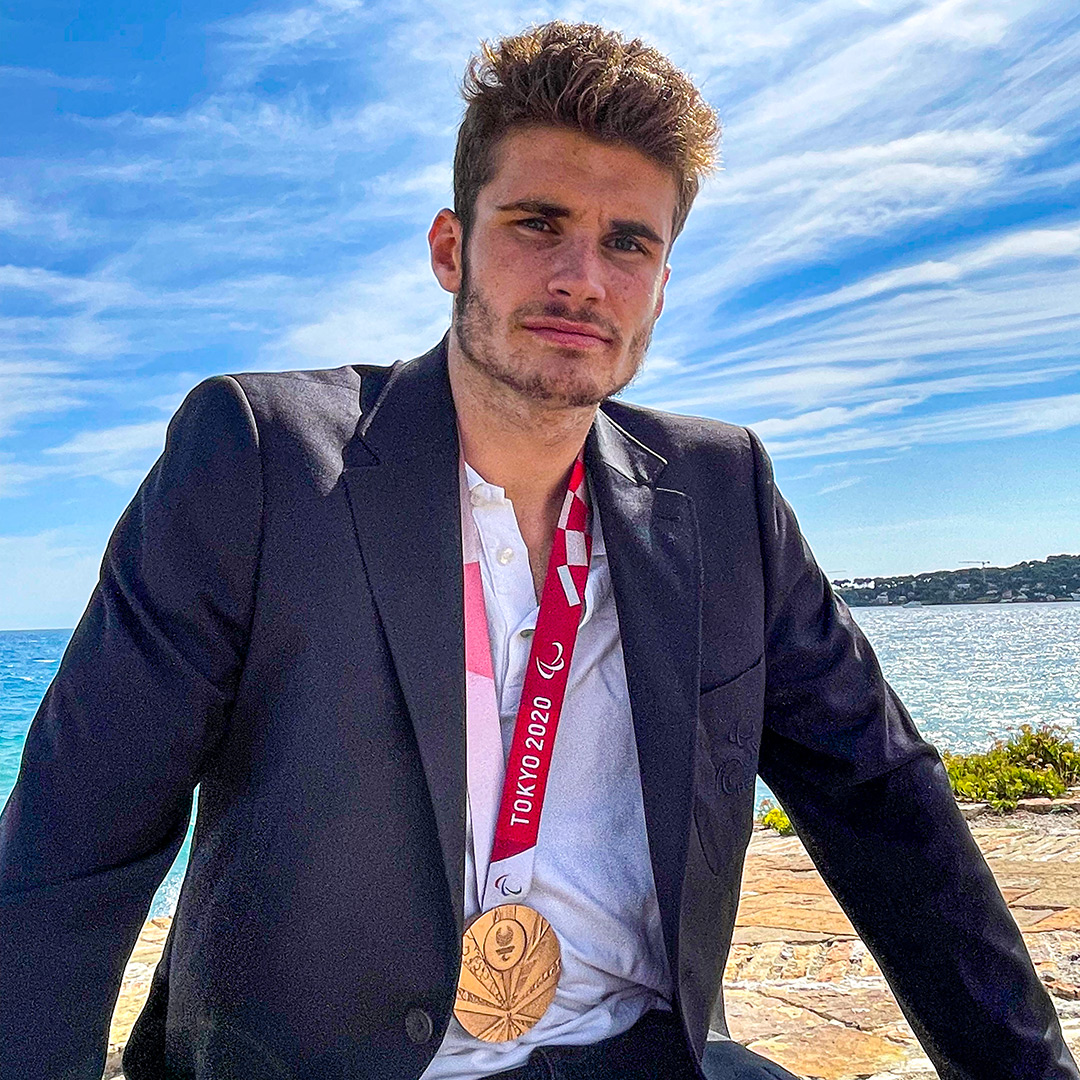

Personal information
- Born: 8 July 2000 (age 25) Granville, Manche, France

Sport
- Sport: Swimming
Medal record
Paralympic Games
Bronze medal – third place	2020 Tokyo	100 m backstroke S10

Florent Marais (born 8 July 2000) is a French Paralympic swimmer. In 2021, he won the bronze medal in the men's 100 metre backstroke S10 event at the 2020 Summer Paralympics in Tokyo, Japan.

In 2018, he competed in the men's 100 metre freestyle S10 event at the 2018 Mediterranean Games held in Tarragona, Spain. He also competed at the 2020 World Para Swimming European Open Championships held in Funchal, Portugal.
