= Ana Karolina Soares =

Brazilian Paralympic swimmer (born 2000)

Personal information
- Full name: Ana Karolina Soares de Oliveira
- Nationality: Brazilian
- Born: 5 April 2000 (age 26)

Sport
- Sport: Paralympic swimming
- Disability class: S14, SM14
Medal record
Women's paralympic swimming
Representing Brazil
Paralympic Games
Bronze medal – third place	2024 Paris	Mixed 4×100 m freestyle S14
World Championships
Silver medal – second place	2025 Singapore	Mixed 4×100 m freestyle relay S14
Silver medal – second place	2025 Singapore	Mixed 4×100 m medley relay S14
Bronze medal – third place	2022 Madeira	Mixed 4×100 m freestyle S14
Bronze medal – third place	2022 Madeira	Mixed 4×100 m medley relay S14
Bronze medal – third place	2023 Manchester	Mixed 4×100 m freestyle relay S14
Parapan American Games
Gold medal – first place	2023 Santiago	200 m freestyle S14
Gold medal – first place	2023 Santiago	100 m backstroke S14
Gold medal – first place	2023 Santiago	100 m butterfly S14
Gold medal – first place	2023 Santiago	200 m ind. medley SM14

Ana Karolina Soares de Oliveira (born 5 April 2000) is a Brazilian Paralympic swimmer.

== Career ==
She represented Brazil at the 2022 World Para Swimming Championships and won bronze medals in the mixed 4 × 100 m freestyle S14 and mixed 4 × 100 m medley relay S14 events. She again competed at the 2023 World Para Swimming Championships and won a bronze medal in the mixed 4 × 100 m freestyle relay S14 event.

In November 2023, she represented Brazil at the 2023 Parapan American Games and won gold medals in the 200 metre freestyle, 100 metre backstroke, 100 metre butterfly and 200 metre individual medley events.

She represented Brazil at the 2024 Summer Paralympics and won a bronze medal in the mixed 4 × 100 metre freestyle relay S14 event. She competed at the 2025 World Para Swimming Championships and won silver medals in the mixed 4 × 100 metre medley relay S14 and mixed 4 × 100 metre freestyle relay S14 events.
