= Ruby Storm =

Australian Paralympic swimmer (born 2003)

Personal information
- Nationality: Australian
- Born: 18 November 2003 (age 22)

Sport
- Country: Australia
- Sport: Paralympic swimming
- Disability class: S14, SB14, SM14
- Club: St Andrew's SC
- Coached by: Ashley Delaney
Medal record
Paralympic swimming
Representing Australia
Paralympic Games
Silver medal – second place	2020 Tokyo	Mixed 4 × 100 m freestyle relay S14
Silver medal – second place	2024 Paris	Mixed 4 × 100 m freestyle relay S14
Bronze medal – third place	2020 Tokyo	100 m butterfly S14
World Para Swimming Championships
Bronze medal – third place	2019 London	Mixed 4 x 100m Freestyle Relay S14
Silver medal – second place	2022 Madeira	Mixed 4 × 100 m freestyle relay S14
Silver medal – second place	2023 Manchester	Mixed 4 × 100 m freestyle relay S14

Ruby Storm (born 18 November 2003) is an Australian Paralympic swimmer with an intellectual disability. She represented Australia at the 2019 World Para Swimming Championships, winning a bronze medal, and at the 2020 Tokyo Paralympics, she won a silver and bronze medal. At the 2024 Paris Paralympics, she won a silver medal.

== Personal ==
Storm was born on 18 November 2003 and grew up in Traralgon, Victoria. She has indigenous heritage.

== Swimming career ==
As a child Storm was scared of the water but she learnt to swim by observing her older sister. She is classified as an S14 swimmer. She smashed records at the 2018 Para Pan Pac trials in winning the 200m freestyle event. At the 2019 World Para Swimming Championships, London, she was a member of the Australian team that won the bronze medal in the Mixed 4 × 100 m Freestyle Relay S14. She also competed in the Women's 200m Freestyle S14, Women's 100m Breaststroke SB14, Women's 200m Individual Medley SM14 and Women's 100m Butterfly S14.

At the 2020 Summer Paralympics, Storm teamed up with Madeleine McTernan, Ricky Betar and Benjamin Hance in the Mixed 4 x 100 m freestyle S14. They won the silver medal with a time of 3:46.38, just under 6 seconds behind the winners, Great Britain, who set a world record. She also won the bronze medal in the Women's 100 m butterfly S14 with a time of 1:06.50, just under 3 seconds slower that Valeriia Shabalina of RPC who broke the world record. In second place was another Australian Paige Leonhardt. She made three other individual finals.

Storm won the silver medal in the Mixed 4 x 100 m Freestyle S14 at the 2022 World Para Swimming Championships, Madeira. She did not medal in three other events.

At the 2022 Commonwealth Games, Birmingham, England, she finished 6th in the Women's 100 m freestyle S14. Storm won a silver medal at the 2023 World Para Swimming Championships in Manchester, England in the Mixed 4 × 100 m freestyle relay S14.

At the 2024 Paris Paralympics, she won a silver medal in the Mixed 4 × 100 m freestyle relay S14. She competed in three other events - Women's 100 butterfly S14 (9th), Women's 00 m freestyle S14 (7th) and Women's 100 m breaststroke SB14 (9th).

Storm was coached by Deen Gooch in Traralgon but, as of 2024, is coached by Ashley Delaney at St Andrews Swim Club on the Sunshine Coast.

== Recognition ==
- 2018 – Junior Annual Gippstar Winner
