= Madeleine McTernan =

Australian Paralympic swimmer (born 2000)

Personal information
- Nationality: Australian
- Born: 29 December 2000 (age 25)

Sport
- Country: Australia
- Sport: Paralympic swimming
- Disability class: S14
- Club: Sharks Aquatics SC
- Coached by: Ken Malcolm
Medal record
Paralympic swimming
Representing Australia
Paralympic Games
Silver medal – second place	2020 Tokyo	Mixed 4 × 100 m freestyle relay S14
Silver medal – second place	2024 Paris	Mixed 4 × 100 m freestyle relay S14
World Para Swimming Championships
Silver medal – second place	2022 Madeira	Mixed 4 × 100 m freestyle relay S14
Silver medal – second place	2022 Madeira	Mixed 4 × 100 m medley relay S14
Gold medal – first place	2023 Manchester	Mixed 4 × 100 m medley relay S14
Silver medal – second place	2023 Manchester	Mixed 4 × 100 m freestyle relay S14

Madeleine "Maddie" McTernan (born 29 December 2000) is an Australian Paralympic swimmer. She represented Australia at the 2020 Tokyo Paralympics and 2024 Paris Paralympics where she won relay silver medals.

== Personal life ==
McTernan was born on 29 December 2000 in Nambour, Queensland. She has an intellectual disability. She grew up in Coffs Harbour where in primary school, she attended St Francis Xavier School in Woolgoolga, New South Wales. In 2016 she moved to the Gold Coast where in high school she went to Aquinas College, Southport.

== Swimming career ==
McTernan is S14 swimmer. Her swimming started as a child and won her first medal in 2013 whilst a grade six student. In Coffs Harbour she was coached by Eugene Brogmus. She moved to St Hilda's Swim Club on the Gold Coast to further her swimming career.

At the 2019 World Para Swimming Championships in London, she finished fifth Women's 100 m Backstroke S14 final. She also finished 9th in the Women’s 200m individual medley SM14 and 10th in the Women’s 200m freestyle S14 but did not progress to the finals.

At the 2019 Brisbane INAS Global Games she represented Australia and won two gold in the woman’s II1 4 x 50m freestyle relay and 4 x 200m women’s II1 freestyle relay. She also won 4 silver in the women’s II1 50m Backstroke, the women’s II1 200m Backstroke, the Women’s 4 x 100m II1 Freestyle relay and the mixed 4 x 100m II1 Freestyle relay and she won a bronze in the Women’s II1 100m Backstroke. International Sports Federation for Persons with Intellectual Disability Global Games.

In February 2020, she won the 200 m freestyle final at the World Para Swimming Series in Melbourne, her first individual international gold medal. In November 2020, at the Australian Virtual Short Course Championships, she set a world record in the Women's 400 m Freestyle Multi-class.

At the 2020 Summer Paralympics, McTernan teamed up with Ruby Storm, Ricky Betar and Benjamin Hance in the Mixed 4 x 100 m freestyle S14. They won the silver medal with a time of 3:46.38, just under 6 seconds behind the winners, Great Britain, who set a world record. She also competed in the Women's 100 m backstroke S14 and qualified for the final, finishing fourth.

At the 2022 World Para Swimming Championships, Madeira, McTernan won two silver medals - Mixed 4 x 100 m Freestyle S14 and Mixed 4 x 100 m Medley relays. She also competed in the Women’s 200m Freestyle S14 where she finished 4th in the final. She finished 5th in the final of the Women’s 100m Backstroke S14. In the Women’s 100m Breaststroke SB14 she finished 12th and did not progress to the final.

At the 2022 Commonwealth Games, Birmingham, England, she finished 5th in the Women's 200 m freestyle S14. McTernan won two medals at the 2023 World Para Swimming Championships in Manchester, England - gold medal in the Mixed 4 x 100 m Medley relays and silver medal Mixed 4 x 100 m Freestyle S14 and finished 8th in the Women’s 200m freestyle S14 and 6th in the Women’s 100m Backstroke S14

At the 2024 Paris Paralympics, she won the silver medal in the Mixed 4 x 100 m freestyle S14 and finished fifth in the Women's 200m freestyle S14 and Women's 100 m backstroke S14.

== Recognition ==
- Sport Australia Hall of Fame Scholarship Holder – Tier 2
