= 2018 World Para Swimming European Championships – Men's 100 metres breaststroke =

The men's 100 metres breaststroke at the 2018 World Para Swimming European Championships was held at the National Aquatic Centre in Dublin from 13 to 19 August. Ten classification finals were held in all over this event.

== Medalists ==
Event	Gold		Silver		Bronze	
SB4	Francesco Bocciardo (ITA)	1:48.16	Stephan Fuhrer (SUI)	1:54.36	Petr Andrysek (CZE)	1:56.91
SB5	Antoni Ponce Bertran (ESP)	1:29.85	Marco Maria Dolfin (ITA)	1:41.36	Ivo Rocha (POR)	1:44.35
SB6	Ievgenii Bogodaiko (UKR)	1:20.31	Andreas Skaar Bjornstad (NOR)	1:24.50	Mark Malyar (ISR)	1:24.67
SB7	Simon Boer (NED)	1:20.67	Torben Schmidtke (GER)	1:27.00	Jurijs Semjonovs (LAT)	1:27.56
SB8	Oscar Salguero Galisteo (ESP)	1:09.24	Tim van Duuren (NED)	1:11.22	Federico Morlacchi (ITA)	1:12.29
SB9	Stefano Raimondi (ITA)	1:06.06	Denys Dubrov (UKR)	1:06.90	Dmytro Vanzenco (UKR)	1:11.03
SB11	Vyktor Smyrnov (UKR)	1:17.15	Israel Oliver (ESP)	1:17.26	Johannes Weinberg (GER)	1:25.06
SB12	Oleksii Fedyna (UKR)	1:04.16	Maksym Veraksa (UKR)	1:10.73	Danylo Chufarov (UKR)	1:11.51
SB13	Ihar Boki (BLR)	1:05.97	Uladzimir Izotau (BLR)	1:07.69	Taliso Engel (GER)	1:08.34
SB14	Scott Quin (GBR)	1:07.21	Conner Morrison (GBR)	1:07.53	Vasyl Krainkyk (UKR)	1:07.88
WR world record | AR area record | CR championship record | GR games record | NR national record | OR Olympic record | PB personal best | SB season best | WL world leading (in a given season)

== See also ==
- List of IPC world records in swimming
