= Stefano Raimondi =

Italian Paralympic swimmer (born 1998)

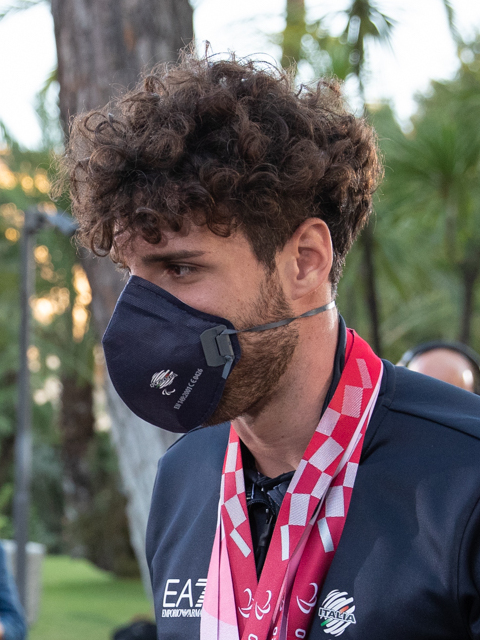
- Raimondi in 2021

Personal information
- National team: Italy
- Born: 1 January 1998 (age 28) Soave, Veneto, Italy

Sport
- Sport: Paralympic swimming
- Disability: Limb deficiency
- Disability class: S10, SB9, SM10
- Club: G.S. Fiamme Oro
Medal record
Paralympic swimming
Representing Italy
| Event | 1st | 2nd | 3rd |
|---|---|---|---|
| Paralympics | 6 | 5 | 2 |
| World Championships | 16 | 9 | 2 |
| European Championships | 6 | 11 | 3 |
| Total | 28 | 25 | 7 |
Paralympic Games
| Gold medal – first place | 2020 Tokyo | 100 m breaststroke SB9 |
| Gold medal – first place | 2024 Paris | 100 m freestyle S10 |
| Gold medal – first place | 2024 Paris | 100 m breaststroke SB9 |
| Gold medal – first place | 2024 Paris | 100 m butterfly S10 |
| Gold medal – first place | 2024 Paris | 200 m medley SM10 |
| Gold medal – first place | 2024 Paris | Mixed 4×100 m freestyle relay 34pts |
| Silver medal – second place | 2020 Tokyo | 100 m backstroke S10 |
| Silver medal – second place | 2020 Tokyo | 100 m butterfly S10 |
| Silver medal – second place | 2020 Tokyo | 200 m medley SM10 |
| Silver medal – second place | 2020 Tokyo | 4 × 100 m freestyle relay 34pts |
| Silver medal – second place | 2024 Paris | 100 m backstroke S10 |
| Bronze medal – third place | 2020 Tokyo | 100 m freestyle S10 |
| Bronze medal – third place | 2020 Tokyo | 4 × 100 m medley relay 34pts |
World Championships
| Gold medal – first place | 2019 London | 100 m freestyle S10 |
| Gold medal – first place | 2019 London | 100 m breaststroke SB9 |
| Gold medal – first place | 2019 London | Men's 4 × 100 m freestyle relay 34pts |
| Gold medal – first place | 2022 Madeira | 400 m freestyle S10 |
| Gold medal – first place | 2022 Madeira | 100 m butterfly S10 |
| Gold medal – first place | 2022 Madeira | 100 m backstroke S10 |
| Gold medal – first place | 2022 Madeira | 100 m breaststroke SB9 |
| Gold medal – first place | 2022 Madeira | 200 m medley SM10 |
| Gold medal – first place | 2022 Madeira | Mixed 4 × 100 m freestyle relay 34pts |
| Gold medal – first place | 2023 Manchester | 400 m freestyle S10 |
| Gold medal – first place | 2023 Manchester | 100 m butterfly S10 |
| Gold medal – first place | 2023 Manchester | 100 m backstroke S10 |
| Gold medal – first place | 2023 Manchester | 100 m breaststroke SB9 |
| Gold medal – first place | 2023 Manchester | 200 m medley SM10 |
| Gold medal – first place | 2025 Singapore | 200 m medley SM10 |
| Gold medal – first place | 2025 Singapore | 100 m butterfly S10 |
| Silver medal – second place | 2019 London | 100 m freestyle S10 |
| Silver medal – second place | 2019 London | 100 m backstroke S10 |
| Silver medal – second place | 2019 London | 200 m medley SM10 |
| Silver medal – second place | 2019 London | 100 m butterfly S10 |
| Silver medal – second place | 2019 London | 4 × 100 m medley relay 34pts |
| Silver medal – second place | 2022 Madeira | 100 m freestyle S10 |
| Silver medal – second place | 2023 Manchester | 100 m freestyle S10 |
| Silver medal – second place | 2023 Manchester | Mixed 4 × 100 m medley relay 34 pts |
| Silver medal – second place | 2025 Singapore | 100 m freestyle S10 |
| Bronze medal – third place | 2022 Madeira | 50 m freestyle S10 |
| Bronze medal – third place | 2025 Singapore | 100 m breaststroke SB9 |
European Championships
| Gold medal – first place | 2018 Dublin | 100 m breaststroke S10 |
| Gold medal – first place | 2018 Dublin | 4 × 100 m freestyle relay |
| Gold medal – first place | 2018 Dublin | 4 × 100 m medley relay |
| Gold medal – first place | 2024 Madeira | 100 m freestyle S10 |
| Gold medal – first place | 2024 Madeira | 100 m breaststroke SB9 |
| Gold medal – first place | 2024 Madeira | 100 m butterfly S10 |
| Silver medal – second place | 2018 Dublin | 100 m backstroke S10 |
| Silver medal – second place | 2018 Dublin | 100 m freestyle S10 |
| Silver medal – second place | 2020 Madeira | 200 m medley SM10 |
| Silver medal – second place | 2020 Madeira | 50 m freestyle S10 |
| Silver medal – second place | 2020 Madeira | 100 m freestyle S10 |
| Silver medal – second place | 2020 Madeira | 400 m freestyle S10 |
| Silver medal – second place | 2020 Madeira | 100 m backstroke S10 |
| Silver medal – second place | 2020 Madeira | 100 m butterfly SB9 |
| Silver medal – second place | 2024 Madeira | 50 m freestyle S10 |
| Silver medal – second place | 2024 Madeira | 100 m backstroke S10 |
| Silver medal – second place | 2026 Kocaeli | 50 m freestyle S10 |
| Bronze medal – third place | 2018 Dublin | 100 m butterfly S10 |
| Bronze medal – third place | 2018 Dublin | 50 m freestyle S10 |
| Bronze medal – third place | 2018 Dublin | 400 m freestyle S10 |

Stefano Raimondi (born 1 January 1998) is an Italian Paralympic swimmer who won 7 medals at the 2020 Summer Paralympics.

== Achievements ==
Raimondi won 34 medals at the paralympic swimming international competitions.

| Year | Competition | Venue | Rank | Event | Time | Note |
|---|---|---|---|---|---|---|
| 2018 | European Championships | (Republic of Ireland) Dublin | 1st | 100 m breaststroke | 1:06.06 | |
| 2018 | European Championships | (Republic of Ireland) Dublin | 1st | 4×100 m freestyle relay | 3:50.86 | |
| 2018 | European Championships | (Republic of Ireland) Dublin | 1st | 4×100 m medley relay | 4:13.79 | |
| 2018 | European Championships | (Republic of Ireland) Dublin | 2nd | 100 m backstroke S10 | 59.30 | |
| 2018 | European Championships | (Republic of Ireland) Dublin | 2nd | 100 m freestyle S10 | 51.99 | |
| 2018 | European Championships | (Republic of Ireland) Dublin | 3rd | 100 m butterfly S10 | 1:00.76 | |
| 2018 | European Championships | (Republic of Ireland) Dublin | 3rd | 400 m freestyle S10 | 4:06.61 | |
| 2018 | European Championships | (Republic of Ireland) Dublin | 3rd | 50 m freestyle S10 | 24.45 | |
| 2019 | World Championships | (United Kingdom) London | 1st | 50 m freestyle S10 | 23.63 | |
| 2019 | World Championships | (United Kingdom) London | 1st | 100 m breaststroke SB9 | 1:05.58 | |
| 2019 | World Championships | (United Kingdom) London | 1st | 4×100 m freestyle relay | 3:46.83 | |
| 2019 | World Championships | (United Kingdom) London | 2nd | 100 m butterfly S10 | 55.31 | |
| 2019 | World Championships | (United Kingdom) London | 2nd | 200 m medley S10 | 2:08.20 | |
| 2019 | World Championships | (United Kingdom) London | 2nd | 100 m freestyle S10 | 51.45 | |
| 2019 | World Championships | (United Kingdom) London | 2nd | 100 m backstroke S10 | 1:00.11 | |
| 2019 | World Championships | (United Kingdom) London | 2nd | 4×100 m medley relay | | |

== See also ==
- Italy at the 2020 Summer Paralympics - Medalists
