= 2023 World Para Swimming Championships – Freestyle relays =

The freestyle relay events at the 2023 World Para Swimming Championships will be held at the Manchester Aquatics Centre between 31 July and 6 August. One will be held solely for S14 (intellectual disability) athletes; the other three will be an aggregate points based system to allow swimmers from multiple classifications to be eligible.

== Medalists ==
Event	Gold	Silver	Bronze
Mixed 4 × 100 m freestyle relay (S14)	Great Britain; William Ellard; Jessica-Jane Applegate; Poppy Maskill; Jordan Catchpole	Australia; Jack Ireland; Madeleine McTernan; Ruby Storm; Benjamin Hance	Brazil; Joao Pedro Brutos de Oliveira; Ana Karolina Soares de Oliveira; Beatriz Borges Carneiro; Gabriel Bandeira
Mixed 4 x 50m freestyle relay (20 points)	China; Guo Jincheng; Lu Dong; He Shenggao; Yuan Weiyi	Brazil	Ukraine; Anna Hontar; Dmytro Vynohradets; Iryna Poida; Oleksandr Komarov
Mixed 4 × 100 m freestyle relay (34 points)	Italy	France	Brazil
Mixed 4 × 100 m freestyle relay (49 points)	Brazil	Spain	Ukraine

== Results ==
=== Mixed 4 x 100m freestyle relay (S14) ===
The race was held as a straight final on 3 August.

The applicable records on entry for this event were as follows:

Record	Team	Time
World record	Great Britain	3:40.63
Championship record	Great Britain	3:42.21

Final

Rank	Nation	Result	Notes
1st place, gold medalist(s)	Great Britain; William Ellard; Jessica-Jane Applegate; Poppy Maskill; Jordan Catchpole	3:42.42	
2nd place, silver medalist(s)	Australia; Jack Ireland; Madeleine McTernan; Ruby Storm; Benjamin Hanse	3:45.58	
3rd place, bronze medalist(s)	Brazil; Joao Pedro Brutos de Oliveira; Ana Karolina Soares de Oliveira; Beatriz Borges Carneiro; Gabriel Bandeira	3:51.12	
4	Hong Kong; Tang Wai Lok; Cheung Tsun Lok; Chan Yui-lam; Cheung Ho Ying	3:56.61	AR
5	Japan; Kinoshita Aira; Matsuda Anku; Serizawa Mikaka; Murakami Shunya	4:02.18	
