= Jack Ireland =

Australian Paralympic swimmer

Personal information
- Nationality: Australian
- Born: 26 August 1999 (age 27)

Sport
- Country: Australia
- Sport: Paralympic swimming
- Disability class: S14, SB14, SM14
- Club: University of Queensland SC
- Coached by: David Heyden
Medal record
Paralympic swimming
Representing Australia
Paralympic Games
Silver medal – second place	2024 Paris	Mixed 4×100 m freestyle relay S14
Bronze medal – third place	2024 Paris	200 m freestyle S14
World Championships
Silver medal – second place	2022 Madeira	Mixed 4 × 100 m freestyle relay S14
Silver medal – second place	2023 Manchester	Mixed 4 × 100 m freestyle relay S14
Bronze medal – third place	2023 Manchester	200 m freestyle S14
Commonwealth Games
Silver medal – second place	2026 Glasgow	200 m freestyle S14
Bronze medal – third place	2022 Birmingham	200 m freestyle S14

Jack Ireland (born 26 August 1999) is an Australian Paralympic swimmer with an intellectual disability. He won medals at the 2022 and 2023 World Para Swimming Championships. He competed at the 2024 Paris Paralympics, where he won a silver and bronze medal.

== Personal ==
He was born 26 August 1999. He grew up in Newcastle, New South Wales. He moved to Gladstone, Queensland in 2013 and attended Gladstone State High School. Jack moved to Brisbane in 2016 and attended his final school year via Brisbane Distance Education.

== Swimming career ==
Ireland started swimming at Floraville Public School in Newcastle, New South Wales. He is classified as a S14 swimmer. At the age of thirteen, he moved to Gladstone QLD with his family and joined Gladstone Gladiators Swim Club. In 2016, he relocated to the Brisbane suburb of St Lucia, to be coached by David Heyden at the University of Queensland Swim Club. Jack made his international debut in 2017 at the Para World Series In Indianapolis. In 2018, he competed at the Para Pan Pac Championships in Cairns as part of the Australia A Team. 2019 saw him selected as an Australian Dolphin #P304. At his first major international competition - 2019 World Para Swimming Championships, London, he finished 8th in the Men's 200m freestyle S14 final.

At the 2022 World Para Swimming Championships in Madeira, he won a silver medal in the Mixed 4 × 100 m freestyle relay S14 and finished fourth Men's 200 m Freestyle S14 .

At the 2022 Commonwealth Games, he won the bronze medal in the 200 m freestyle S14. At the 2023 World Para Swimming Championships in Manchester, England, he won a silver and a bronze medal in S14 relay events.

At the 2024 Paris Paralympics, he won the bronze medal in the Men's 200 m freestyle S14 and silver medal in the Mixed 4 x 100 m freestyle S14.

He is coached by David Heyden at the University of Queensland Swim Club.

== Recognition ==
- 2016/17 - Swimmer with Disability of the Year by Brisbane Swimming in Queensland, Australia.
- 2016 - Gladstone Regional Council Australia Day Junior Athlete of the Year.
