= Benjamin Hance =

Australian Paralympic swimmer

Benjamin Hance OAM
Personal information
- Nationality: Australian
- Born: 25 July 2000 (age 26)
- Height: 191 cm (6 ft 3 in)

Sport
- Country: Australia
- Sport: Paralympic swimming
- Disability class: S14
- Club: St. Andrews
- Coached by: Ashley Delaney
Medal record
Paralympic swimming
Representing Australia
Paralympic Games
Gold medal – first place	2020 Tokyo	100 m backstroke S14
Gold medal – first place	2024 Paris	100 m backstroke S14
Silver medal – second place	2020 Tokyo	Mixed 4 × 100 m freestyle relay S14
Silver medal – second place	2024 Paris	Mixed 4 × 100 m freestyle relay S14
Bronze medal – third place	2020 Tokyo	100 metre butterfly S14
World Championships
Gold medal – first place	2022 Madeira	100 m backstroke S14
Gold medal – first place	2023 Manchester	100 m backstroke S14
Gold medal – first place	2023 Manchester	Mixed 4 × 100 m medley relay 49 pts
Gold medal – first place	2025 Singapore	100 m backstroke S14
Silver medal – second place	2022 Madeira	Mixed 4 × 100 m freestyle relay S14
Silver medal – second place	2022 Madeira	Mixed 4 × 100 m medley relay S14
Silver medal – second place	2023 Manchester	Mixed 4 × 100 m freestyle relay S14
Bronze medal – third place	2022 Madeira	200 m freestyle S14
Bronze medal – third place	2023 Manchester	100 m butterfly S14
Commonwealth Games
Silver medal – second place	2022 Birmingham	200 m freestyle S14

Benjamin "Ben" Hance OAM (born 25 July 2000) is an Australian Paralympic swimmer. At the 2020 Tokyo Paralympics, he won a gold, silver and bronze medal and at the 2024 Paris Paralympic, he won a gold and silver medal.

== Swimming career ==
He is classified as a S14 swimmer. In 2021, Hance holds the world record for the Men's 100 m Backstroke (S14) by swimming a time of 58.88 (1019 points) at the 2021 Australian Multi-Class Swimming Championships.

At the 2020 Tokyo Paralympics, Hance won the gold medal in the Men's 100 m backstroke S14 with a personal best time of 57.73. He also won a bronze medal in the Men's 100 m butterfly S14 with a time of 56.90, less than 2 seconds behind the winner, Gabriel Bandeira from Brazil.

At the 2022 World Para Swimming Championships, Madeira, Hance won four medals - gold in the Men's 100m Backstroke S14, silver in Mixed 4 × 100 m freestyle relay S14 and Mixed 4 × 100 m medley relay S14 and bronze in the Men's 200 m Freestyle S14 In the medley he teamed up with Madeleine McTernan, Ricky Betar, and Ruby Storm. They won the silver medal with a time of 3:46.38, just under 6 seconds behind the winners, Great Britain, who set a world record. He did not medal in two other events.

At the 2022 Commonwealth Games, he won the silver medal in the 200 m freestyle S14. At the 2023 World Para Swimming Championships, Manchester, England, he won four medals - 2 gold, one silver and one bronze medal.

In 2023, Hance is coached by Ashley Delaney at St Andrews on the Sunshine Coast. He was previously coached by Nathan Doyle.

At the 2024 Paris Paralympics, he won the gold medal in the Men's 100 m backstroke S14. He broke the world record in the hears with a time of 56.52. He finished fourth in the Men's 100 m butterfly S14. He was a member of the Mixed 4 x 100 m freestyle S14 that won the silver medal.

At the 2025 World Para Swimming Championships in Singapore, he won the gold medal in the Men's 100 m Backstroke S14.

== Recognition ==
- 2021 - AIS Discovery of the Year at Swimming Australia Awards
- 2022 – Medal of the Order of Australia for service to sport as a gold medallist at the Tokyo Paralympic Games 2020
