= Nicholas Bennett (swimmer) =

Canadian Paralympic swimmer

Personal information
- Born: November 15, 2003 (age 22) Parksville, British Columbia, Canada
- Height: 182 cm (6 ft 0 in)

Sport
- Country: Canada
- Sport: Paralympic swimming
- Disability: Autism
- Disability class: S14, SB14, SM14
- Club: Ravensong Breakers Swim Club, Qualicum Beach
Medal record
Paralympic swimming
Representing Canada
Paralympic Games
| Gold medal – first place | 2024 Paris | 100 m breaststroke SB14 |
| Gold medal – first place | 2024 Paris | 200 m ind. medley SM14 |
| Silver medal – second place | 2024 Paris | 200 m freestyle S14 |
World Championships
| Gold medal – first place | 2023 Manchester | 200 m freestyle S14 |
| Gold medal – first place | 2023 Manchester | 200 m ind. medley SM14 |
| Silver medal – second place | 2022 Madeira | 200 m freestyle S14 |
| Silver medal – second place | 2022 Madeira | 200 m ind. medley SM14 |
| Silver medal – second place | 2023 Manchester | 100 m breaststroke SB14 |
| Bronze medal – third place | 2025 Singapore | 200 m freestyle S14 |
| Bronze medal – third place | 2025 Singapore | 200 m ind. medley SM14 |
Commonwealth Games
| Gold medal – first place | 2022 Birmingham | 200 m freestyle S14 |
Parapan American Games
| Gold medal – first place | 2019 Lima | 100 m breaststroke SB14 |
| Gold medal – first place | 2019 Lima | 200 m freestyle S14 |
| Gold medal – first place | 2019 Lima | 200 m ind. medley SM14 |
| Silver medal – second place | 2019 Lima | 100 m butterfly S14 |

Nicholas Bennett (born November 15, 2003) is a Canadian Paralympic swimmer who competes in international level events.

== Career ==
Diagnosed autistic, Bennett first attracted major notice by becoming a triple champion at the 2019 Parapan American Games in Lima, Peru. After winning two silver medals at the 2022 World Para Swimming Championships, Bennett was part of Canadian team for the 2022 Commonwealth Games in Birmingham, and won gold in the 200 m freestyle S14. He said he was "just ecstatic" with the result. In 2024 during the Canadian Olympic & Paralympic Trials Bennett broke both the World record and Canadian record in the 200 m individual medley S14 at 2:05.97. Bennett became a two time Paralympic Champion in the 100 m breastroke SB14 and 200 m individual medley SM14, during the 2024 Paralympic Games in Paris. He also placed second in the 200 m freestyle S14 at the 2024 Paralympic Games.
