= Carol Santiago =

Brazilian Paralympic swimmer (born 1985)

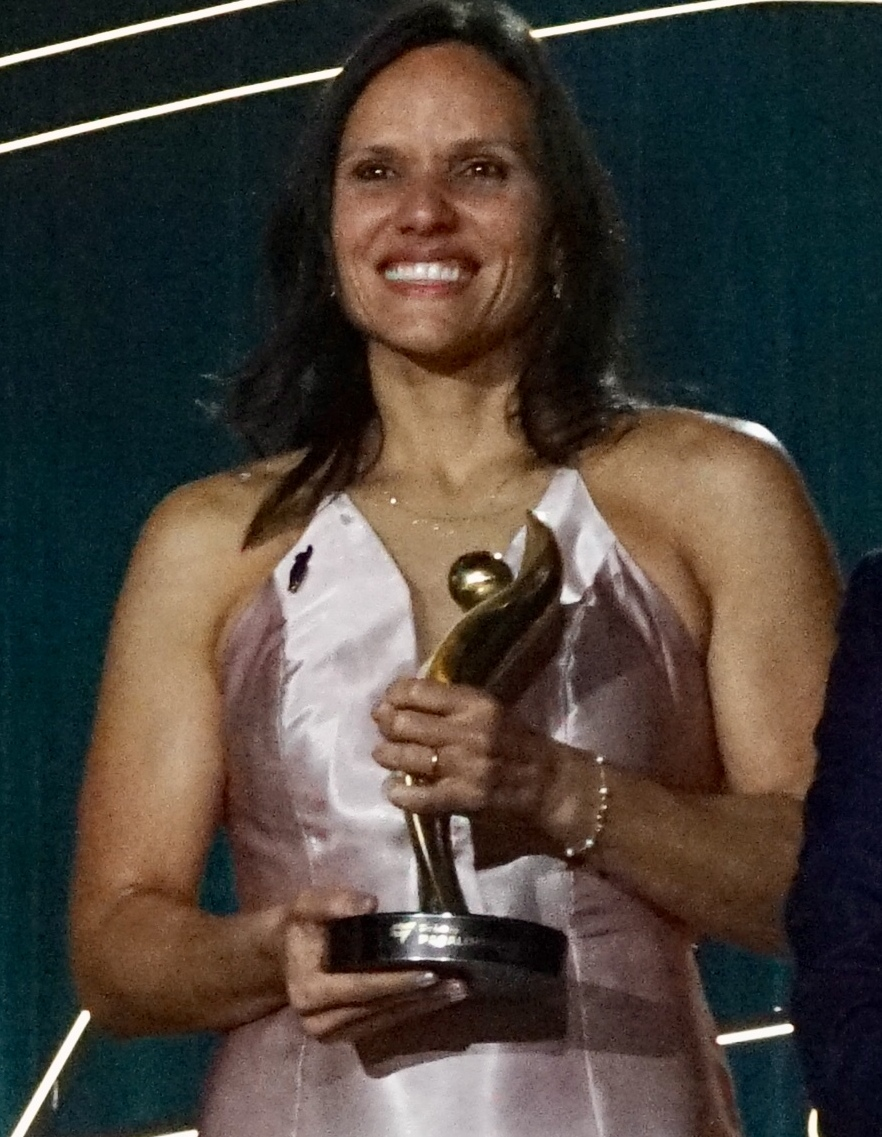
- Santiago in December 2024

Personal information
- Full name: Maria Carolina Gomes Santiago
- Nickname: Carol
- Born: 2 August 1985 (age 41) Recife, Brazil
- Home town: São Paulo, Brazil

Sport
- Country: Brazil
- Sport: Paralympic swimming
- Disability: Morning glory syndrome
- Disability class: S12
- Club: Gremio Nautico Uniao, Porto Alegre
- Coached by: Leonardo Tomasello Araujo
Medal record
Paralympic swimming
Representing Brazil
Paralympic Games
Gold medal – first place	2020 Tokyo	50 m freestyle S13
Gold medal – first place	2020 Tokyo	100 m freestyle S12
Gold medal – first place	2020 Tokyo	100 m breaststroke SB12
Gold medal – first place	2024 Paris	50 m freestyle S13
Gold medal – first place	2024 Paris	100 m freestyle S12
Gold medal – first place	2024 Paris	100 m backstroke S12
Silver medal – second place	2020 Tokyo	Mixed 4×100 m freestyle relay 49pts
Silver medal – second place	2024 Paris	100 m breaststroke SB12
Silver medal – second place	2024 Paris	Mixed 4×100 m freestyle relay 49pts
Bronze medal – third place	2020 Tokyo	100 m backstroke S12
World Championships
Gold medal – first place	2019 London	50m freestyle S12
Gold medal – first place	2019 London	100m freestyle S12
Gold medal – first place	2022 Madeira	50m freestyle S12
Gold medal – first place	2022 Madeira	100m breaststroke SB12
Gold medal – first place	2022 Madeira	100m freestyle S12
Gold medal – first place	2023 Manchester	100m backstroke S12
Gold medal – first place	2023 Manchester	50m freestyle S12
Gold medal – first place	2023 Manchester	100m freestyle S12
Gold medal – first place	2025 Singapore	100m backstroke S12
Gold medal – first place	2025 Singapore	Mixed 4×100 m medley relay 49pts
Gold medal – first place	2025 Singapore	100m freestyle S12
Silver medal – second place	2019 London	100m backstroke S12
Silver medal – second place	2019 London	Mixed 4x100m freestyle relay 49pts
Silver medal – second place	2023 Manchester	100m breaststroke SB12
Silver medal – second place	2025 Singapore	Mixed 4×100m freestyle relay 49pts
Bronze medal – third place	2023 Manchester	200m medley SM13
Parapan American Games
Gold medal – first place	2019 Lima	50m freestyle S12
Gold medal – first place	2019 Lima	100m freestyle S12
Gold medal – first place	2019 Lima	400m freestyle S12
Gold medal – first place	2019 Lima	100m backstroke S12

Maria Carolina Gomes Santiago (born 2 August 1985), also known as Carol Santiago, is a Brazilian Paralympic swimmer who competes in international level events. She competed at the 2020 Summer Paralympics and the 2024 Summer Paralympics, winning ten medals, including six gold medals.

== Personal life ==
Santiago has a congenital eye condition called morning glory syndrome, a defect in her optic nerve. She is partially sighted in her left eye, but does not have peripheral vision in her right eye.

She began swimming at age four, and took part in able-bodied swimming competitions and open water swimming at age twelve. By the age of seventeen, she was completely blind for eight months due to accumulation of water in her retina and stopped swimming. She went back to swimming a decade later at age 27 and started to swim competitively again.

== Career ==
In 2019 at the Caixa Open, she broke the Brazilian national record in the 50m freestyle that was set by Fabiana Sugimori at the 2004 Summer Paralympics in Athens. During the 2020 Summer Paralympics, Santiago was the gold medalist in the 50 m freestyle S13, the 100 m freestyle S12 and the 100 m breaststroke S12, becoming the first Brazilian female swimmer to win three gold medals in the same edition of the Games.

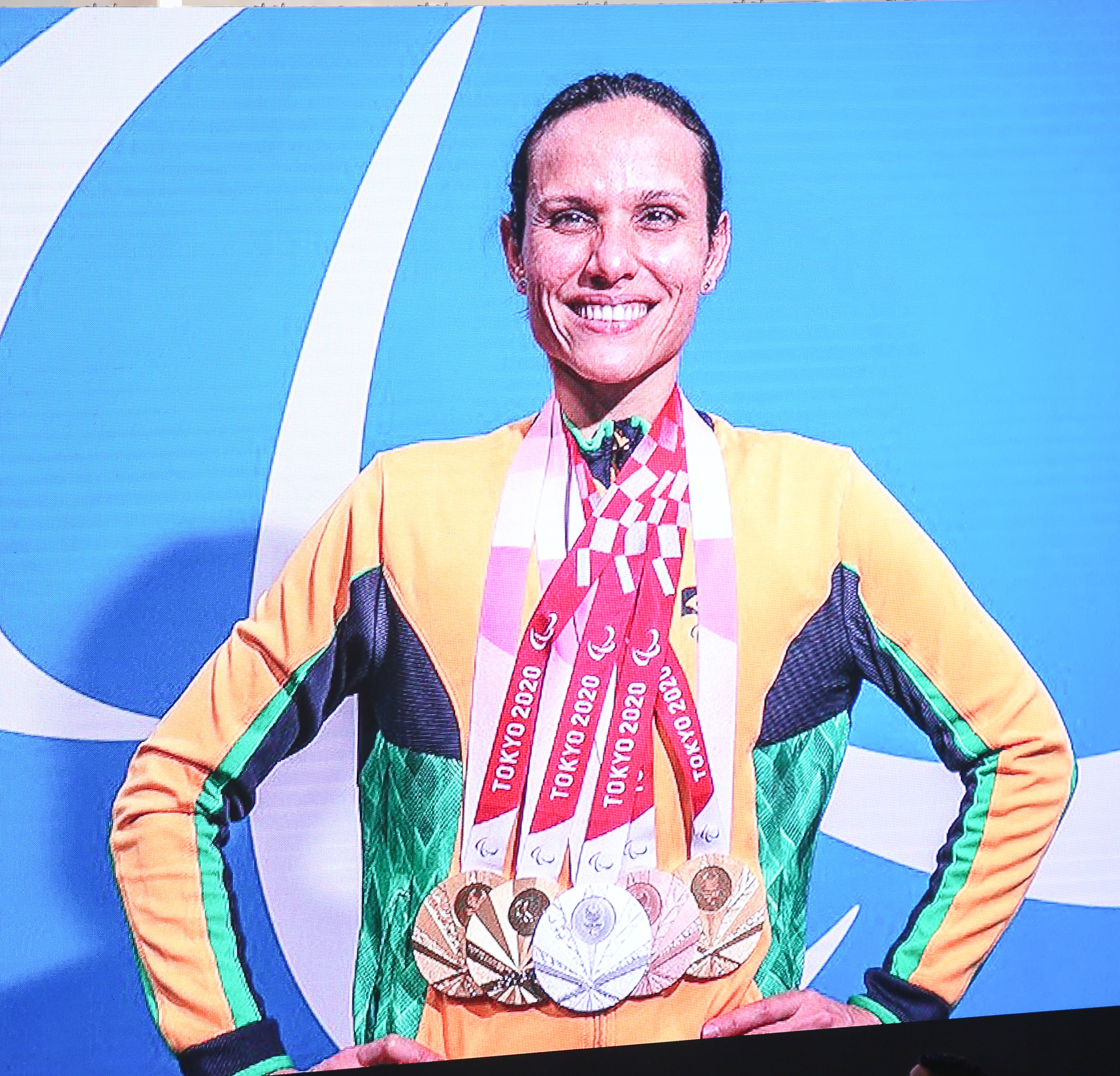
Santiago with all the medals she won at the 2020 Summer Paralympics

She holds the world record in the 50 m freestyle in the S12 class (for athletes with visual impairment), first set in São Paulo on 4 June 2021.

Santiago won seven medals at the 2022 World Championships, held in Madeira, Portugal: gold in the 50 m freestyle, 100 m freestyle, 100 m butterfly, 100 m breaststroke, and in the 4×100 m medley relay and mixed 4×100 m freestyle relay (49 points, for visually impaired athletes); in addition to a silver medal in the 100 m backstroke.

At the 2023 edition in Manchester, England, Santiago earned eight medals: gold in the 50 m freestyle, 100 m backstroke, 100 m freestyle, 100 m butterfly and in the mixed 4×100 m freestyle relay (49 points); silver in the 100 m breaststroke; and bronze in the 200 m individual medley and the mixed 4×100 m medley relay (49 points).

In November 2023, Santiago reached a significant milestone at the Parapan American Games in Santiago, achieving her 30th career medal when considering all events in which she represented Brazil. During the competition, she won two gold medals in the 100 m backstroke and 50 m freestyle, further establishing herself as one of Brazil's greatest Paralympic athletes.

Moving into 2024, Santiago continued to impress at the Paris 2024 Summer Paralympics. On 31 August, she won the gold medal in the 100 m backstroke, bringing her career total to six medals. She also delivered notable performances in other events, including silver in the 100 m breaststroke, reaching her fifth medal in Paris.

In September 2024, Santiago established herself as Brazil's most decorated Paralympian, accumulating multiple records and R$900,000 in prize earnings from her achievements. During the Paris Paralympics, she won three additional gold medals, securing her place at the top of Brazilian Paralympic sport. She was also selected as Brazil's flag bearer at the closing ceremony of the Games.

These achievements placed Santiago among the five greatest Paralympic athletes in Brazil's history. Her performances in Paris not only reinforced her dominance but also led to widespread recognition from the media and fans as a national sporting icon. In her events, she exceeded expectations, winning gold despite pressure from the French crowd.

Santiago continued her dominance in the pool by winning her third gold medal in Paris, further establishing herself as the Brazilian athlete with the most Paralympic gold medals in history.

== Achievements ==
Year	Tournament	Place	Event	Result	Time
2019	2019 World Para Swimming Championships	London, Great Britain	50 metre freestyle S12	1st	27.41
2019	2019 World Para Swimming Championships	London, Great Britain	100 metre freestyle S12	1st	59.66
2019	2019 World Para Swimming Championships	London, Great Britain	Mixed 4 × 100 metre freestyle relay 49pts	2nd	3:53.17
2019	2019 World Para Swimming Championships	London, Great Britain	100 metre backstroke S12	2nd	1:11.44
2021	2020 Summer Paralympics	Tokyo, Japan	50 metre freestyle S13	1st	26.82
2021	2020 Summer Paralympics	Tokyo, Japan	100 metre freestyle S12	1st	59.01
2021	2020 Summer Paralympics	Tokyo, Japan	100 metre breaststroke SB12	1st	1:14.89
2021	2020 Summer Paralympics	Tokyo, Japan	Mixed 4 × 100 metre freestyle relay 49pts	2nd	3:54.95
2021	2020 Summer Paralympics	Tokyo, Japan	100 metre backstroke S12	3rd	1:09.18
