= José Ramón Cantero Elvira =

Spanish Paralympic swimmer

José Cantero
Personal information
- Full name: José Ramón Cantero Elvira
- Nationality: Spanish
- Born: 6 August 1993 (age 33)

Sport
- Country: Spain
- Sport: Swimming
Medal record
Men's para-swimming
Representing Spain
Paralympic Games
Bronze medal – third place	2024 Paris	Mixed 4×100 m freestyle relay 49pts
World Championships
Gold medal – first place	2025 Singapore	Mixed 4×100 m freestyle relay 49pts

José Ramón Cantero Elvira (born 6 August 1993) is a visually impaired Spanish swimmer who has represented Spain at the 2012 Summer Paralympics.

== Personal ==
Cantero has a vision impairment, and is blind as a result of complications resulting from lack of oxygen during birth. Growing up, he spent his summers in Huete. He learned how to read using braille with assistance from an instructor from ONCE. In 2012, he was studying journalism during his second year at university. He was still enrolled in the program in 2013. He had a job writing press releases for Móstoles Sports Association. In December 2013, he attended an event marking Spanish insurance company Santa Lucía Seguros becoming a sponsor of the Spanish Paralympic Committee, and consequently Plan ADOP which funds high performance Spanish disability sport competitors. He chose to attend the event because he wanted to show support for this type of sponsorship.

Cantero does not use a cane or a guide dog.

== Swimming ==
When Cantero was six years old, he started taking swimming classes provided by ONCE at a pool in Madrid. He is a member of C.N. Móstoles.

Cantero competed at the 2009 German Open.

While Cantero trains at the Huete municipal pool, the Huete City Council has not provided any assistance and Cantero has to pay to train there. In 2012, he trained six days a week with two daily pool sessions. He set a Paralympic qualifying time for London at the 20th Trofeo Ciudad de Móstoles. He medaled at the 2012 Spanish national championships. In June 2012, he participated in the Castilla and León Adapted Swimming Open, which served as a Paralympic qualifying event. He competed at the 2012 Summer Paralympics, where he had a top ten finish. He was one of twelve vision impaired Spanish swimmers competing at the 2012 Games. He was also one of three swimmers from his club to go to London alongside Omar Font and Deborah Font. Prior to heading to London, he participated in a national vision impaired swim team training camp at the High Performance Centre of Sant Cugat from 6 to 23 August. Daily at the camp, there were two in water training sessions and one out of water training session.

In November 2013, Cantero competed in the Spanish national swimming Championship by age. In 2013, he had a goal of medalling at the 2016 Summer Paralympics. Admiring the Australian swimming culture and support for its athletes, he has thought about going to Australia to train but friends, family and coaches have so far dissuaded him from doing so.
