= 2025 World Para Swimming Championships – Men's 100 metre breaststroke =

The men's 100 m breaststroke events at the 2025 World Para Swimming Championships were held at the Singapore Aquatic Centre between 21 and 27 September 2025.

== Schedule ==
Men's 100 m breaststroke events for men will be held across the following schedule:

Men's 100 m breaststroke
Day	Date	Classifications
Day 1	21 Sept	#SB4; #SB9
Day 2	22 Sept	#SB13
Day 3	23 Sept	#SB7; #SB11; #SB14
Day 4	24 Sept	#SB12
Day 5	25 Sept	#SB5
Day 6	26 Sept	#SB6
Day 7	27 Sept	#SB8

== Medal summary ==
Event	Gold	Silver	Bronze
SB4; Details	Dmitrii Cherniaev; Individual Neutral Athletes	Moisés Fuentes; Colombia	Antonios Tsapatakis; Greece
SB5; Details	Andrei Granichka; Individual Neutral Athletes	Antoni Ponce Bertran; Spain	Danylo Semenykhin; Ukraine
SB6; Details	Nelson Crispín; Colombia	Yang Hong; China	Jesús Alberto Gutiérrez Bermúdez; Mexico
SB7; Details	Carlos Serrano Zárate; Colombia	Egor Efrosinin; Individual Neutral Athletes	Kyrylo Poida; Ukraine
SB8; Details	Andrei Kalina; Individual Neutral Athletes	Daniil Smirnov; Individual Neutral Athletes	Óscar Salguero; Spain
SB9; Details	Hector Denayer; France	Artem Isaev; Individual Neutral Athletes	Stefano Raimondi; Italy
SB11; Details	Rogier Dorsman; Netherlands	Danylo Chufarov; Ukraine	David Kratochvíl; Czech Republic
SB12; Details	Timofei Guk; Individual Neutral Athletes	Nurdaulet Zhumagali; Kazakhstan	Oleksii Fedyna; Ukraine
SB13; Details	Taliso Engel; Germany	Thomas van Wanrooij; Netherlands	Stepan Lisitskii; Individual Neutral Athletes
SB14; Details	Naohide Yamaguchi; Japan	Jake Michel; Australia	Harry Stewart; Great Britain

== Race summaries ==
=== SB4 ===
The men's 100 m breaststroke SB4 event will be held on 21 September.

The relevant records in the lead up to this event where as follows:

Record	Athlete	Time	Date	City	Country
World	Dmitrii Cherniaev (IPC)	1:31.96	2021-08-29	Tokyo	Japan
Championship	Li Junsheng (CHN)	1:32.38	2017-12-02	Mexico City	Mexico
African	Ahmad Mohamed Hashad (EGY)	1:52.89	2023-11-11	Cairo	Egypt
American	Daniel Dias (BRA)	1:32.27	2012-09-04	London	United Kingdom
Asian	Li Junsheng (CHN)	1:32.38	2017-12-02	Mexico City	Mexico
European	Dmitrii Cherniaev (IPC)	1:31.96	2021-08-29	Tokyo	Japan
Oceanian	Cameron Leslie (NZL)	2:11.93	2020-02-15	Melbourne	Australia

==== Heats ====
Fourteen swimmers will take part, with the top eight progressing to the final.

Rank	Heat	Lane	Athlete	Time	Note
1	2	4	Dmitrii Cherniaev (AIN)	1:34.56	Q
2	1	4	Antonios Tsapatakis (GRE)	1:37.20	Q
3	2	5	Moisés Fuentes (COL)	1:39.47	Q
4	2	3	M Zulkafli (MAS)	1:42.49	Q
5	1	3	Artem Oliinyk (UKR)	1:44.10	Q
6	1	6	Aleksandr Molkov (AIN)	1:45.57	Q
7	2	2	Hubert Podgorski (POL)	1:46.28	Q
8	1	5	Manuel Mateo Bortuzzo (ITA)	1:49.66	Q
9	1	7	Ali Turganbekov (KAZ)	1:50.96	R
10	2	7	Zeyad Kahil (EGY)	1:52.40	R
11	1	2	Luis Huerta Poza (ESP)	1:58.51	
12	2	1	Luis Eduardo Visuete Lopez (PAN)	2:11.55	
	1	1	Hussain Alrashid (KSA)	DSQ	
	2	6	Nicolas Rivero (ARG)	DNS	

==== Final ====
Rank	Lane	Athlete	Time	Note
1st place, gold medalist(s)	4	Dmitrii Cherniaev (AIN)	1:33.39	
2nd place, silver medalist(s)	3	Moisés Fuentes (COL)	1:38.94	
3rd place, bronze medalist(s)	5	Antonios Tsapatakis (GRE)	1:39.73	
4	2	Artem Oliinyk (UKR)	1:41.37	
5	6	Muhammad Zulkafli (MAS)	1:43.27	
6	7	Aleksandr Molkov (AIN)	1:44.90	
7	1	Hubert Podgorski (POL)	1:47.62	
8	8	Manuel Mateo Bortuzzo (ITA)	1:50.29	

=== SB5 ===
The men's 100 m breaststroke SB5 event will be held on 25 September.

The relevant records in the lead up to this event where as follows:

Record	Athlete	Time	Date	City	Country
World	Andrei Granichka (IPC)	1:25.13	2021-08-28	Tokyo	Japan
Championship	Antoni Ponce Bertran (ESP)	1:26.80	2023-08-04	Manchester	United Kingdom
African	Tadhg Slattery (RSA)	1:32.13	2002-12-12	Mar del Plata	Argentina
American	Pedro Rangel Haro (MEX)	1:33.42	2006-12-03	Durban	South Africa
Asian	Li Junsheng (CHN)	1:28.80	2019-09-09	London	United Kingdom
European	Andrei Granichka (IPC)	1:25.13	2021-08-28	Tokyo	Japan
Oceanian	Rodney Bonsack (AUS)	1:40.50	1996-08-24	Atlanta	United States

==== Final ====
Eight swimmers took part in a straight final.

Rank	Lane	Athlete	Class	Result	Notes
1st place, gold medalist(s)	3	Andrei Granichka (AIN)	SB5	1:27.30	
2nd place, silver medalist(s)	5	Antoni Ponce Bertran (ESP)	SB5	1:27.32	
3rd place, bronze medalist(s)	6	Danylo Semenykhin (UKR)	SB5	1:32.31	
4	4	Leo McCrea (SUI)	SB5	1:32.42	
5	2	Vladyslav Koshman (UKR)	SB5	1:36.11	
6	7	German Leonel Arevalo (ARG)	SB5	1:42.14	
7	1	Andrii Drapkin (UKR)	SB5	1:42.40	
8	8	Artem Solovev (AIN)	SB5	1:43.36	

=== SB6 ===
The men's 100 m breaststroke SB6 event was held on 26 September. Ten swimmers took part, with the top eight progressing to the final.

The relevant records in the lead up to this event where as follows:

Record	Athlete	Time	Date	City	Country
World	Nelson Crispín (COL)	1:17.59	2024-05-30	Berlin	Germany
Championship	Nelson Crispín (COL)	1:19.24	2019-09-15	London	United Kingdom
African	Ahmed Ali (EGY)	1:42.99	2021-06-17	Berlin	Germany
American	Nelson Crispín (COL)	1:17.59	2024-05-30	Berlin	Germany
Asian	Yang Hong (CHN)	1:18.34	2024-09-01	Paris	France
European	Yevhenii Bohodaiko (UKR)	1:18.71	2016-09-15	Rio de Janeiro	Brazil
Oceanian	Matthew Levy (AUS)	1:21.10	2021-08-28	Tokyo	Japan

==== Heats ====
Rank	Heat	Lane	Athlete	Class	Result	Notes
1	1	4	Nelson Crispín (COL)	SB6	1:21.28	Q
2	1	2	Jesus Alberto Gutierrez (MEX)	SB6	1:21.68	Q
3	1	8	Santiago León (COL)	SB6	1:21.84	Q
4	1	5	Yang Hong (CHN)	SB6	1:22.08	Q
5	1	3	Morgan Ray (USA)	SB6	1:22.60	Q
6	1	6	Bruce Dee (GBR)	SB6	1:23.26	Q
7	1	0	David Rendón (COL)	SB6	1:26.27	Q
8	1	1	Guo Jincheng (CHN)	SB6	1:26.66	Q
9	1	7	Zach Shattuck (USA)	SB6	1:26.96	
10	1	9	Raul Gutierrez (MEX)	SB6	1:29.31	

==== Final ====
Rank	Lane	Athlete	Class	Result	Notes
1st place, gold medalist(s)	4	Nelson Crispín (COL)	SB6	1:19.11	CR
2nd place, silver medalist(s)	6	Yang Hong (CHN)	SB6	1:20.10	
3rd place, bronze medalist(s)	5	Jesus Alberto Gutierrez (MEX)	SB6	1:20.87	
4	7	Bruce Dee (GBR)	SB6	1:20.97	
5	2	Morgan Ray (USA)	SB6	1:21.69	
6	3	Santiago León (COL)	SB6	1:23.19	
7	1	David Rendón (COL)	SB6	1:25.88	
8	8	Guo Jincheng (CHN)	SB6	1:29.16	

=== SB7 ===
The men's 100 m breaststroke SB7 event will be held on 23 September.

The relevant records in the lead up to this event where as follows:

Record	Athlete	Time	Date	City	Country
World	Carlos Serrano Zárate (COL)	1:10.32	2023-08-06	Manchester	United Kingdom
Championship	Carlos Serrano Zárate (COL)	1:10.32	2023-08-06	Manchester	United Kingdom
African	Christian Sadie (RSA)	1:20.87	2022-06-14	Funchal	Portugal
American	Carlos Serrano Zárate (COL)	1:10.32	2023-08-06	Manchester	United Kingdom
Asian	Huang Xianquan (CHN)	1:20.08	2023-10-26	Hangzhou	China
European	Egor Efrosinin (IPC)	1:16.43	2021-09-01	Tokyo	Japan
Oceanian	Blake Cochrane (AUS)	1:16.84	2015-04-18	Berlin	Germany

==== Heats ====
Fourteen swimmers will take part, with the top eight progressing to the final.

Rank	Heat	Lane	Athlete	Class	Result	Notes
1	2	4	Carlos Serrano Zárate (COL)	SB7	1:17.78	Q
2	2	5	Kyrylo Poida (UKR)	SB7	1:18.85	Q
3	1	2	Egor Efrosinin (AIN)	SB7	1:19.36	Q
4	1	5	Gabriel Kowalski (POL)	SB7	1:20.42	Q
5	1	4	Turgut Aslan Yaraman (TUR)	SB7	1:20.57	Q
6	2	3	Christian Sadie (RSA)	SB7	1:21.24	Q
7	1	7	Huang Xianquan (CHN)	SB7	1:22.03	Q
8	1	6	Maksim Baskakov (AIN)	SB7	1:23.95	Q
9	1	3	Riccardo Magrassi (ITA)	SB7	1:24.36	
10	2	6	Yevhenii Mandryka (UKR)	SB7	1:24.57	
11	2	2	Marco Ozaeta Velasco (ESP)	SB7	1:25.89	
12	2	7	Yurii Bozhynskyi (UKR)	SB7	1:28.58	
13	2	1	Evgenii Stepanov (AIN)	SB7	1:28.99	
14	1	1	Jurijs Semjonovs (LAT)	SB7	1:39.38	

==== Final ====
Rank	Lane	Athlete	Class	Result	Notes
1st place, gold medalist(s)	4	Carlos Serrano Zárate (COL)	SB7	1:16.02	
2nd place, silver medalist(s)	3	Egor Efrosinin (AIN)	SB7	1:17.26	
3rd place, bronze medalist(s)	5	Kyrylo Poida (UKR)	SB7	1:17.25	
4	7	Christian Sadie (RSA)	SB7	1:19.95	AF
5	2	Turgut Aslan Yaraman (TUR)	SB7	1:20.01	
6	6	Gabriel Kowalski (POL)	SB7	1:20.17	
7	8	Maksim Baskakov (AIN)	SB7	1:23.56	
	1	Huang Xianquan (CHN)	SB7		DNS

=== SB8 ===
The men's 100 m breaststroke SB8 event was held on 27 September. Eleven swimmers took part, with the top eight progressing to the final.

The relevant records in the lead up to this event where as follows:

Record	Athlete	Time	Date	City	Country
World	Andrei Kalina (UKR)	1:07.01	2008-09-09	Beijing	China
Championship	Andrei Kalina (UKR)	1:07.05	2013-08-15	Montreal	Canada
African	Kaleb van der Merwe (RSA)	1:23.29	2017-04-04	Durban	South Africa
American	Vicente Almonacid (CHI)	1:09.83	2021-05-22	Funchal	Portugal
Asian	Yang Guanglong (CHN)	1:09.83	2024-08-30	Paris	France
European	Andrei Kalina (UKR)	1:07.01	2008-09-09	Beijing	China
Oceanian	Matthew Cowdrey (AUS)	1:09.88	2012-09-01	London	United Kingdom

==== Heats ====
Rank	Heat	Lane	Athlete	Class	Result	Notes
1	2	4	Andrei Kalina (AIN)	SB8	1:10.84	Q
2	1	3	Joshua Willmer (NZL)	SB8	1:11.08	Q
3	2	3	Daniil Smirnov (AIN)	SB8	1:11.70	Q
4	1	5	Óscar Salguero (ESP)	SB8	1:12.81	Q
5	2	5	Timothy Hodge (AUS)	SB8	1:12.91	Q
6	1	6	Andreas Onea (AUT)	SB8	1:14.40	Q
7	2	2	Abd Halim Mohammad (MAS)	SB8	1:15.52	Q
8	2	6	Robin Liksor (EST)	SB8	1:15.59	Q
9	1	2	Carlos Martinez Fernandez (ESP)	SB8	1:16.68	
10	1	4	Vicente Almonacid (CHI)	SB8	1:17.89	
11	2	7	Taiyo Kawabuchi (JPN)	SB8	1:22.24	

==== Final ====
Rank	Lane	Athlete	Class	Result	Notes
1st place, gold medalist(s)	4	Andrei Kalina (AIN)	SB8	1:08.43	
2nd place, silver medalist(s)	3	Daniil Smirnov (AIN)	SB8	1:10.72	
3rd place, bronze medalist(s)	6	Óscar Salguero (ESP)	SB8	1:11.57	
4	5	Joshua Willmer (NZL)	SB8	1:11.61	
5	2	Timothy Hodge (AUS)	SB8	1:12.53	
6	1	Abd Halim Mohammad (MAS)	SB8	1:14.00	
7	8	Robin Liksor (EST)	SB8	1:15.06	
8	7	Andreas Onea (AUT)	SB8	1:12.53	

=== SB9 ===
The men's 100 m breaststroke SB9 event will be held on 21 September.

The relevant records in the lead up to this event where as follows:

Record	Athlete	Time	Date	City	Country
World	Pavel Poltavtsev (RUS)	1:04.02	2012-09-08	London	United Kingdom
Championship	Kevin Paul (RSA)	1:04.50	2015-07-15	Glasgow	United Kingdom
African	Kevin Paul (RSA)	1:04.50	2015-07-15	Glasgow	United Kingdom
American	James Leroux (CAN)	1:08.56	2019-09-14	London	United Kingdom
Asian	Lin Furong (CHN)	1:07.12	2016-09-08	Rio de Janeiro	Brazil
European	Pavel Poltavtsev (RUS)	1:04.02	2012-09-08	London	United Kingdom
Oceanian	Rick Pendleton (AUS)	1:08.27	2016-09-08	Rio de Janeiro	Brazil

==== Heats ====
Fourteen swimmers will take part, with the top eight progressing to the final.

Rank	Heat	Lane	Athlete	Time	Note
1	1	4	Hector Denayer (FRA)	1:07.92	Q
2	1	3	Ian Florencio Fernandez (ESP)	1:08.18	Q
3	1	5	Artem Isaev (AIN)	1:08.75	Q
4	2	5	Maurice Wetekam (GER)	1:08.76	Q
5	2	2	Sina Zeyghaminejad (IRI)	1:09.44	Q
6	2	1	Zeiad Tarek Hasby (EGY)	1:09.60	Q
7	2	4	Stefano Raimondi (ITA)	1:09.64	Q
8	2	3	Shuyuan Tang (CHN)	1:09.84	Q
9	2	6	Dmitrii Grigorev (AIN)	1:10.15	R
10	2	7	Aiden Stivers (USA)	1:10.56	R
11	1	2	Fernando Lu (CAN)	1:11.71	
12	1	6	Tadeas Strasik (CZE)	1:12.90	
13	1	7	James Leroux (CAN)	1:13.46	
14	1	1	Jareth Min Ern Wong (SGP)	1:40.78	

==== Final ====
Rank	Lane	Athlete	Time	Note
1st place, gold medalist(s)	4	Hector Denayer (FRA)	1:05.28	
2nd place, silver medalist(s)	3	Artem Isaev (AIN)	1:06.46	
3rd place, bronze medalist(s)	1	Stefano Raimondi (ITA)	1:07.29	
4	5	Ian Florencio Fernandez (ESP)	1:07.98	
5	2	Sina Zeyghaminejad (IRI)	1:08.01	
6	8	Shuyuan Tang (CHN)	1:09.22	
7	6	Maurice Wetekam (GER)	1:09.23	
8	7	Zeiad Tarek Hasby (EGY)	1:09.39	

=== SB11 ===
The men's 100 metre breaststroke SB11 event was held on 23 September.

The relevant records in the lead up to this event where as follows:

Record	Athlete	Time	Date	Venue	Country
World	Yang Bozun (CHN)	1:10.08	2016-09-13	Rio de Janeiro	Brazil
Championship	Rogier Dorsman (NED)	1:10.31	2023-08-02	Manchester	United Kingdom
African	Hendri Herbst (RSA)	1:35.01	2011-08-12	Edmonton, Alberta	Canada
American	Tharon Drake (USA)	1:10.85	2016-06-30	Charlotte, NC	United States
Asian	Yang Bozun (CHN)	1:10.08	2016-09-13	Rio de Janeiro	Brazil
European	Rogier Dorsman (NED)	1:10.31	2023-08-02	Manchester	United Kingdom
Oceanian	Luke Andrews (AUS)	1:36.47	2019-02-16	Melbourne	Australia

==== Heats ====
10 swimmers took part, with the top eight progressing to the final.

Rank	Heat	Lane	Athlete	Class	Result	Notes
1	1	4	Rogier Dorsman (NED)	SB11	1:11.02	Q
2	1	5	Danylo Chufarov (UKR)	SB11	1:15.41	Q
3	1	3	David Kratochvíl (CZE)	SB11	1:16.19	Q
4	1	6	Edgaras Matakas (LTU)	SB11	1:16.20	Q
5	1	2	José Cantero (ESP)	SB11	1:19.67	Q
6	1	1	Yang Shen (CHN)	SB11	1:21.45	Q
7	1	9	Himanshu Nandal (IND)	SB11	1:22.69	Q
8	1	8	Mahamadou Dambelleh Jarra (ESP)	SB11	1:22.94	Q
9	1	7	Amir Muratbekov (KAZ)	SB11	1:23.53	
10	1	0	Li Zhixin (CHN)	SB11	1:26.34	

==== Final ====
Rank	Lane	Athlete	Class	Result	Notes
1st place, gold medalist(s)	4	Rogier Dorsman (NED)	SB11	1:11.78	
2nd place, silver medalist(s)	5	Danylo Chufarov (UKR)	SB11	1:12.66	
3rd place, bronze medalist(s)	3	David Kratochvíl (CZE)	SB11	1:13.68	
4	6	Edgaras Matakas (LTU)	SB11	1:15.81	
5	2	José Cantero (ESP)	SB11	1:18.78	
6	7	Yang Shen (CHN)	SB11	1:20.60	
7	8	Mahamadou Dambelleh Jarra (ESP)	SB11	1:22.24	
8	1	Himanshu Nandal (IND)	SB11	1:22.30	

=== SB12 ===
The men's 100 metre breaststroke SB12 event was held on 23 September.

The relevant records in the lead up to this event where as follows:

Record	Athlete	Time	Date	Venue	Country
World	Oleksii Fedyna (UKR)	1:04.07	2014-08-04	Eindhoven	Netherlands
Championship	Oleksii Fedyna (UKR)	1:04.62	2019-09-12	London	United Kingdom
African	Hendri Herbst (RSA)	1:29.49	2010-08-16	Eindhoven	Netherlands
American	Daniel Giraldo Correa (COL)	1:10.53	2016-09-13	Rio de Janeiro	Brazil
Asian	Nurdaulet Zhumagali (KAZ)	1:04.83	2024-09-05	Paris	France
European	Oleksii Fedyna (UKR)	1:04.07	2014-08-04	Eindhoven	Netherlands
Oceanian	Kingsley Bugarin (AUS)	1:10.06	2000-10-22	Sydney	Australia

==== Heats ====
Ten swimmers took part, with the top eight progressing to the final.

Rank	Heat	Lane	Athlete	Time	Note
1	1	4	Nurdaulet Zhumagali (KAZ)	1:07.74	Q
2	1	3	Timofei Guk (AIN)	1:09.19	Q
3	1	2	Ivan Salguero Oteiza (ESP)	1:11.11	Q
4	1	6	Uladzimir Izotau (AIN)	1:11.14	Q
5	1	5	Oleksii Fedyna (UKR)	1:11.38	Q
6	1	7	Shamil Shahov (QAT)	1:11.72	Q
7	1	1	Alex Villarejo (ESP)	1:14.16	Q
8	1	0	Roman Mychka (UKR)	1:16.29	Q
9	1	9	Juan Ferron Gutierrez (ESP)	1:17.22	R
10	1	8	Karimi Jahan Abadi (IRI)	1:17.25	R

==== Final ====
Rank	Lane	Athlete	Time	Note
1st place, gold medalist(s)	5	Timofei Guk (AIN)	1:06.51	
2nd place, silver medalist(s)	4	Nurdaulet Zhumagali (KAZ)	1:06.64	
3rd place, bronze medalist(s)	2	Oleksii Fedyna (UKR)	1:06.99	
4	6	Uladzimir Izotau (AIN)	1:09.75	
5	3	Ivan Salguero (ESP)	1:10.66	
6	7	Shamil Shahov (QAT)	1:11.21	
7	1	Alex Villarejo (ESP)	1:13.03	
8	8	Roman Mychka (UKR)	1:15.65	

=== SB13 ===
The men's 100 metre breaststroke SB13 event was held on 23 September.

The relevant records in the lead up to this event where as follows:

Record	Athlete	Time	Date	Venue	Country
World	Taliso Engel (GER)	1:01.84	2024-09-05	Paris	France
Championship	Taliso Engel (GER)	1:03.26	2023-08-01	Manchester	United Kingdom
African	Nathan Hendricks (RSA)	1:11.37	2024-04-22	Funchal	Portugal
American	David Henry Abrahams (USA)	1:04.04	2021-09-01	Tokyo	Japan
Asian	Nurdaulet Zhumagali (KAZ)	1:04.09	2022-06-13	Funchal	Portugal
European	Taliso Engel (GER)	1:01.84	2024-09-05	Paris	France
Oceanian	Daniel Sharp (NZL)	1:06.72	2012-09-08	London	United Kingdom

==== Heats ====
Ten swimmers took part, with the top eight progressing to the final.

Rank	Heat	Lane	Athlete	Class	Result	Notes
1	1	4	Taliso Engel (GER)	SB13	1:02.42	CR, Q
2	1	5	Thomas van Wanrooij (NED)	SB13	1:06.68	Q
3	1	3	Stepan Lisitskii (AIN)	SB13	1:08.69	Q
4	1	2	Yauheni Kavalionak (AIN)	SB13	1:09.31	Q
5	1	7	Philip Hebmueller (GER)	SB13	1:10.00	Q
6	1	6	Guilherme Batista (BRA)	SB13	1:10.81	Q
7	1	1	Gabriel Steen (NOR)	SB13	1:11.07	Q
8	1	0	Genki Saito (JPN)	SB13	1:11.54	Q
9	1	8	Oleksii Virchenko (UKR)	SB13	1:15.09	
10	1	9	Zhi Wei Wong (SGP)	SB13	1:17.06	

==== Final ====
Rank	Lane	Athlete	Class	Result	Notes
1st place, gold medalist(s)	4	Taliso Engel (GER)	SB13	1:01.69	WR
2nd place, silver medalist(s)	5	Thomas van Wanrooij (NED)	SB13	1:06.01	
3rd place, bronze medalist(s)	3	Stepan Lisitskii (AIN)	SB13	1:07.69	
4	2	Philip Hebmueller (GER)	SB13	1:08.82	
5	6	Yauheni Kavalionak (AIN)	SB13	1:09.04	
6	7	Guilherme Batista (BRA)	SB13	1:10.67	
7	1	Gabriel Steen (NOR)	SB13	1:10.99	
8	8	Genki Saito (JPN)	SB13	1:12.40	

=== SB14 ===
The men's 100 metre breaststroke SB14 event will be held on 23 September.

The relevant records in the lead up to this event where as follows:

Record	Athlete	Time	Date	City	Country
World	Naohide Yamaguchi (JPN)	1:02.64	2025-04-10	Fuji	Japan
Championship	Naohide Yamaguchi (JPN)	1:03.71	2023-08-02	Manchester	United Kingdom
African	Record Mark (IPC)	1:09.11			
American	Nicholas Bennett (CAN)	1:03.71	2024-05-14	Toronto	Canada
Asian	Naohide Yamaguchi (JPN)	1:02.64	2025-04-10	Fuji	Japan
European	Harry Stewart (GBR)	1:04.79	2025-07-20	Sheffield	United Kingdom
Oceanian	Jake Michel (AUS)	1:04.27	2024-09-02	Paris	France

==== Heats ====
Fifteen swimmers took part, with the top eight progressing to the final.

Rank	Heat	Lane	Athlete	Class	Result	Notes
1	2	1	Jake Michel (AUS)	SB14	1:04.13	Q, OCR
2	2	3	Harry Stewart (GBR)	SB14	1:04.57	Q, EUR
3	2	4	Naohide Yamaguchi (JPN)	SB14	1:04.94	Q
4	1	4	Nicholas Bennett (CAN)	SB14	1:05.78	Q
5	1	5	João Pedro Brutos (BRA)	SB14	1:06.42	Q
6	2	2	Yuto Sato (JPN)	SB14	1:08.23	Q
7	1	1	Robert Isak Jonsson (ISL)	SB14	1:08.67	Q
8	1	3	Vasyl Krainyk (UKR)	SB14	1:08.75	Q
9	1	6	Artem Pavlenko (AIN)	SB14	1:09.33	
10	2	6	Deaten Registe (IRL)	SB14	1:09.35	
11	2	7	Rodion Berdnik (AIN)	SB14	1:10.36	
12	1	2	Aymeric Parmentier (BEL)	SB14	1:10.42	
13	1	7	Cameron Vearncombe (GBR)	SB14	1:11.29	
14	2	1	Asher Smith-Franklin (NZL)	SB14	1:12.24	
15	2	8	Liang Chou Han (SGP)	SB14	1:23.47	

==== Final ====
Rank	Lane	Athlete	Class	Result	Notes
1st place, gold medalist(s)	3	Naohide Yamaguchi (JPN)	SB14	1:03.36	CR
2nd place, silver medalist(s)	4	Jake Michel (AUS)	SB14	1:03.51	OC
3rd place, bronze medalist(s)	5	Harry Stewart (GBR)	SB14	1:04.04	ER
4	6	Nicholas Bennett (CAN)	SB14	1:04.90	
5	2	João Pedro Brutos (BRA)	SB14	1:06.37	
6	8	Vasyl Krainyk (UKR)	SB14	1:07.24	
7	1	Robert Isak Jonsson (ISL)	SB14	1:08.18	
8	7	Yuto Sato (JPN)	SB14	1:08.87	
