= 2025 World Para Swimming Championships – Men's 200 metre individual medley =

The men's 200 metre individual medley events at the 2025 World Para Swimming Championships were held at the Singapore Aquatic Centre between 21 and 27 September 2025. There are nine events over this distance, covering ten classifications.

== Schedule ==
The 200 metre individual medley events for men will be held across the following schedule:

men's 200 metre individual medley
Day	Date	Classifications
Day 1	21 Sept	SM7
Day 2	22 Sept	SM9; SM10
Day 3	23 Sept	SM6
Day 4	24 Sept	SM5; SM11
Day 5	25 Sept	SM14
Day 6	26 Sept	SM8
Day 7	27 Sept	SM13

== Medal summary ==
Event	Gold	Silver	Bronze
SM5	Guo Jincheng; China	Antoni Ponce Bertran; Spain	Dmitrii Cherniaev; Individual Neutral Athletes
SM6	Yang Hong; China	Jesús Alberto Gutiérrez Bermúdez; Mexico	Nelson Crispín; Colombia
SM7	Iñaki Basiloff; Argentina	Christian Sadie; South Africa	Aleksei Ganiuk; Individual Neutral Athletes
SM8	Callum Simpson; Australia	Reid Maxwell; Canada	Dimosthenis Michalentzakis; Greece
SM9	Timothy Hodge; Australia	Hector Denayer; France	Ugo Didier; France
SM10	Stefano Raimondi; Italy	Koehn Boyd; United States	Ihor Nimchenko; Ukraine
SM11	Danylo Chufarov; Ukraine	Rogier Dorsman; Netherlands	David Kratochvil; Czech Republic
SM13	Egor Shchitkovskii; Individual Neutral Athletes	Alex Portal; France	Timofei Guk; Individual Neutral Athletes
SM14	Gabriel Bandeira; Brazil	Rhys Darbey; Great Britain	Nicholas Bennett; Canada

== Race summaries ==
=== SM5 ===
The men's 200 metre individual medley SM 5 event was held on 24 September.

The relevant records at the beginning of the event were as follows:

Record	Athlete	Time	Date	City	Country
World	Guo Jincheng (CHN)	2:46.55	2023-08-03	Manchester	United Kingdom
Championship	Guo Jincheng (CHN)	2:46.55	2023-08-03	Manchester	United Kingdom
Americas	Daniel Dias (BRA)	2:48.92	2011-04-29	Berlin	Germany
Asian	Guo Jincheng (CHN)	2:46.55	2023-08-03	Manchester	United Kingdom
European	Antoni Ponce Bertran (ESP)	2:48.02	2020-12-06	Castellon	Spain

==== Heats ====
Fourteen swimmers took part, with the top eight progressing to the final.

Rank	Heat	Lane	Athlete	Time	Note
1	1	4	Antoni Ponce Bertran (ESP)	2:53.78	Q
2	1	5	Dmitrii Cherniaev (AIN)	2:56.92	Q
3	2	4	Guo Jincheng (CHN)	2:57.56	Q
4	2	3	Samuel de Oliveira (BRA)	3:01.64	Q
5	2	5	Artem Oliinyk (UKR)	3:11.67	Q
6	2	6	Tiago Ferreira (BRA)	3:14.90	Q
7	1	6	Koral Berkin Kutlu (TUR)	3:15.32	Q
8	1	3	Eigo Tanaka (JPN)	3:19.70	Q
9	2	2	Ismail Zulfic (BIH)	3:22.57	R
10	1	2	Luis Huerta Poza (ESP)	3:23.05	R
11	2	7	Noam Katav (ISR)	3:30.16	
12	1	7	Sebastian Massabie (CAN)	3:30.55	
13	1	1	Phuchit Aingchaiyaphum (THA)	3:38.39	
14	2	1	Hubert Podgorski (POL)	3:39.56	

==== Final ====
Rank	Lane	Athlete	Time	Note
1st place, gold medalist(s)	3	Guo Jincheng (CHN)	2:49.24	
2nd place, silver medalist(s)	4	Antoni Ponce Bertran (ESP)	2:50.88	
3rd place, bronze medalist(s)	5	Dmitrii Cherniaev (AIN)	2:58.58	
4	2	Artem Oliinyk (UKR)	2:58.83	
5	6	Samuel de Oliveira (BRA)	3:00.32	
6	7	Tiago Ferreira (BRA)	3:10.19	
7	1	Koral Berkin Kutlu (TUR)	3:10.58	
8	8	Eigo Tanaka (JPN)	3:12.28	

=== SM6 ===
The men's 200 metre individual medley SM6 event was held on 23 September.

The relevant records at the beginning of the event were as follows:

Record	Athlete	Time	Date	City	Country
World	Yang Hong (CHN)	2:37.31	2024-08-30	Paris	France
Championship	Nelson Crispín (COL)	2:39.96	2023-08-02	Manchester	United Kingdom
African	Ahmed Ali (EGY)	3:12.79	2021-06-20	Berlin	Germany
Americas	Nelson Crispín (COL)	2:38.04	2024-08-30	Paris	France
Asian	Yang Hong (CHN)	2:37.31	2024-08-30	Paris	France
European	Sascha Kindred (GBR)	2:38.47	2016-09-12	Rio de Janeiro	Brazil
Oceania	Hamish McLean (NZL)	2:53.06	2019-09-11	London	United Kingdom

==== Heats ====
Twelve swimmers will take part, with the top eight progressing to the final

Rank	Heat	Lane	Athlete	Time	Note
1	1	4	Nelson Crispín (COL)	2:42.67	Q
2	1	3	Jesús Alberto Gutiérrez (MEX)	2:43.63	Q
3	2	3	Bruce Dee (GBR)	2:43.83	Q
4	2	4	Yang Hong (CHN)	2:44.09	Q
5	1	5	Andrei Granichka (AIN)	2:47.02	Q
6	2	6	Raul Gutiérrez (MEX)	2:47.43	Q
7	2	5	Talisson Glock (BRA)	2:51.54	Q
8	1	2	Yanbo Luo (CHN)	2:54.27	Q
9	2	2	David Sanchez Sierra (ESP)	2:57.62	Rq
10	1	6	Morgan Ray (USA)	2:58.68	R
11	2	7	Bence Ivan (HUN)	3:01.51	
12	1	7	Josué Rodrigo (ESA)	3:12.77	

==== Final ====
Talisson Glock of Brazil withdrew from the final and was replaced by the first reserve, David Sanchez Sierra of Spain.

Rank	Lane	Athlete	Time	Note
1st place, gold medalist(s)	6	Yang Hong (CHN)	2:36.73	WR
2nd place, silver medalist(s)	5	Jesús Alberto Gutiérrez (MEX)	2:37.06	AMR
3rd place, bronze medalist(s)	4	Nelson Crispín (COL)	2:41.12	
4	3	Bruce Dee (GBR)	2:41.52	
5	2	Andrei Granichka (AIN)	2:42.14	
6	7	Raul Gutierrez (MEX)	2:49.17	
7	1	Luo Yanbo (CHN)	2:54.09	
8	8	David Sanchez Sierra (ESP)	3:01.61	

=== SM7 ===
The men's 200 metre individual medley SM7 event was held on 21 September.

The relevant records at the beginning of the event were as follows:

Record	Athlete	Time	Date	City	Country
World	Andrii Trusov (UKR)	2:28.19	2023-07-31	Manchester	United Kingdom
Championship	Andrii Trusov (UKR)	2:28.19	2023-07-31	Manchester	United Kingdom
African	Christian Sadie (RSA)	2:35.02	2024-08-31	Paris	France
Americas	Carlos Serrano Zárate (COL)	2:29.62	2023-07-31	Manchester	United Kingdom
Asian	Wang Jingang (CHN)	2:38.30	2016-09-13	Rio de Janeiro	Brazil
European	Andrii Trusov (UKR)	2:28.19	2023-07-31	Manchester	United Kingdom
Oceania	Matthew Levy (AUS)	2:36.99	2016-09-13	Rio de Janeiro	Brazil

==== Heats ====
Nine swimmers will take part, with the top eight progressing to the final

Rank	Heat	Lane	Athlete	Time	Note
1	1		Christian Sadie (RSA)	2:36.36	Q
2	1		Inaki Basiloff (ARG)	2:38.95	Q
3	1		Aleksei Ganiuk (AIN)	2:44.64	Q
4	1		Riccardo Magrassi (ITA)	2:48.85	Q
5	1		Xianquan Huang (CHN)	2:49.68	Q
6	1		Federico Bicelli (ITA)	2:56.87	Q
7	1		Jurijs Semjonovs (LAT)	2:57.47	Q
8	1		Ernie Gawilan (PHI)	3:02.17	Q
-	1		Egor Efrosinin (AIN)	DSQ	

==== Final ====
The final was held on the evening of 21 September.

Rank	Lane	Athlete	Time	Note
1st place, gold medalist(s)		Inaki Basiloff (ARG)	2:30.65	
2nd place, silver medalist(s)		Christian Sadie (RSA)	2:34.03	
3rd place, bronze medalist(s)		Aleksei Ganiuk (AIN)	2:41.66	
4		Federico Bicelli (ITA)	2:42.80	
5		Riccardo Magrassi (ITA)	2:45.70	
6		Xianquan Huang (CHN)	2:48.32	
7		Ernie Gawilan (PHI)	3:00.60	
8		Jurijs Semjonovs (LAT)	3:01.45	

=== SM8 ===
The men's 200 metre individual medley SM 8 event was held on 26 September. Fourteen swimmers took part, with the top eight progressing to the final

The relevant records at the beginning of the event were as follows:

Record	Athlete	Time	Date	City	Country
World	Oliver Hynd (GBR)	2:20.01	2016-09-17	Rio de Janeiro	Brazil
Championship	Peter Leek (AUS)	2:21.84	2010-08-15	Eindhoven	Netherlands
African	Jean-Jacques Terblanche (RSA)	2:40.83	1996-08-17	Atlanta	United States of America
Americas	Robert Griswold (USA)	2:22.72	2019-09-14	London	United Kingdom
Asian	Xu Haijiao (CHN)	2:20.19	2018-10-06	Jakarta	Indonesia
European	Oliver Hynd (GBR)	2:20.01	2016-09-17	Rio de Janeiro	Brazil
Oceania	Peter Leek (AUS)	2:20.92	2008-09-11	Beijing	China

==== Heats ====
Rank	Heat	Lane	Athlete	Class	Result	Notes
1	2	7	Azizbek Boynazarov (UZB)	SM8	2:29.77	Q
2	1	6	Callum Simpson (AUS)	SM8	2:29.86	Q
3	1	5	Reid Maxwell (CAN)	SM8	2:30.11	Q
4	1	2	Li Ting (CHN)	SM8	2:30.55	Q
5	2	4	Dimosthenis Michalentzakis (GRE)	SM8	2:30.67	Q
6	1	4	Kotaro Ogiwara (JPN)	SM8	2:30.82	Q
7	1	3	Carlos Martinez Fernandez (ESP)	SM8	2:31.30	Q
8	2	5	Noah Jaffe (USA)	SM8	2:31.65	Q
9	2	3	Liu Fengqi (CHN)	SM8	2:31.77	
10	2	2	Turgut Aslan Yaraman (TUR)	SM8	2:31.80	
11	2	6	Andreas Onea (AUT)	SM8	2:32.44	
12	1	7	Evgenii Stepanov (AIN)	SM8	2:35.88	
13	2	1	Michal Golus (POL)	SM8	2:42.99	
	1	1	Maksim Baskakov (AIN)	SM8		DSQ

==== Final ====
Rank	Lane	Athlete	Class	Result	Notes
1st place, gold medalist(s)	5	Callum Simpson (AUS)	SM8	2:25.49	
2nd place, silver medalist(s)	3	Reid Maxwell (CAN)	SM8	2:26.72	
3rd place, bronze medalist(s)	2	Dimosthenis Michalentzakis (GRE)	SM8	2:27.24	
4	8	Noah Jaffe (USA)	SM8	2:27.64	
5	4	Azizbek Boynazarov (UZB)	SM8	2:28.22	
6	7	Kotaro Ogiwara (JPN)	SM8	2:29.31	
7	6	Li Ting (CHN)	SM8	2:29.35	
8	1	Carlos Martinez Fernandez (ESP)	SM8	2:30.65	

=== SM9 ===
The men's 200 metre individual medley SM 9 event was held on 22 September.

The relevant records at the beginning of the event were as follows:

Record	Athlete	Time	Date	City	Country
World	Timothy Hodge (AUS)	2:12.03	2024-06-12	Brisbane	Australia
Championship	Timothy Hodge (AUS)	2:12.74	2023-08-01	Manchester	United Kingdom
African	Matthew Moss (RSA)	2:34.69	2023-11-10	Cairo	Egypt
Americas	Cody Bureau (USA)	2:20.13	2014-08-09	Pasadena	United States
Asian	Guo Zhi (CHN)	2:19.35	2010-08-16	Eindhoven	Netherlands
European	Andrei Kalina (RUS)	2:14.90	2021-09-01	Tokyo	Japan
Oceania	Timothy Hodge (AUS)	2:12.06	2023-04-20	Southport	Australia

==== Heats ====
Fifteen swimmers took part, with the top eight progressing to the final

Rank	Heat	Lane	Athlete	Class	Result	Notes
1	2	4	Timothy Hodge (AUS)	SM9	2:18.59	Q
2	1	4	Ugo Didier (FRA)	SM9	2:20.05	Q
3	1	6	Xie Zhili (CHN)	SM9	2:20.93	Q
4	1	3	Jian Wang Escanilla Candial (ESP)	SM9	2:20.96	Q
5	2	5	Hector Denayer (FRA)	SM9	2:21.96	Q
6	2	6	Maurice Wetekam (GER)	SM9	2:22.98	Q
7	2	7	Sam de Visser (BEL)	SM9	2:23.21	Q
8	1	5	Bogdan Mozgovoi (AIN)	SM9	2:24.45	Q
9	2	2	Jonas Kesnar (CZE)	SM9	2:25.27	
10	1	2	Taiyo Kawabuchi (JPN)	SM9	2:26.22	
11	2	1	Victor dos Santos (BRA)	SM9	2:26.65	
12	1	1	Óscar Salguero (ESP)	SM9	2:27.41	
13	2	8	Abolfazl Zarif Pouresmaeilyazdi (IRI)	SM9	2:34.13	
14	2	3	Andrei Kalina (AIN)	SM9	2:34.83	
15	1	7	Jacobo Garrido Brun (ESP)	SM9	2:38.04	

==== Final ====
Rank	Lane	Athlete	Class	Result	Notes
1st place, gold medalist(s)	4	Timothy Hodge (AUS)	SM9	2:14.49	
2nd place, silver medalist(s)	2	Hector Denayer (FRA)	SM9	2:15.63	
3rd place, bronze medalist(s)	5	Ugo Didier (FRA)	SM9	2:15.64	
4	8	Bogdan Mozgovoi (AIN)	SM9	2:18.92	
5	6	Jian Wang Escanilla Candial (ESP)	SM9	2:19.51	
6	3	Xie Zhili (CHN)	SM9	2:20.78	
7	7	Maurice Wetekam (GER)	SM9	2:23.85	
8	1	Sam de Visser (BEL)	SM9	2:24.34	

=== SM10 ===
The men's 200 metre individual medley SM10 event was held on 25 September.

The relevant records at the beginning of the event were as follows:

Record	Athlete	Time	Date	City	Country
World	Denys Dubrov (UKR)	2:05.63	2018-08-18	Dublin	Ireland
Championship	Maksym Krypak (UKR)	2:06.13	2019-09-10	London	United Kingdom
African	Kevin Paul (RSA)	2:14.97	2012-08-30	London	United Kingdom
Americas	Benoit Huot (CAN)	2:10.01	2012-08-30	London	United Kingdom
Asian	Akito Minai (JPN)	2:18.03	2024-03-10	Fuji	Japan
European	Denys Dubrov (UKR)	2:05.63	2018-08-18	Dublin	Ireland
Oceania	Rick Pendleton (AUS)	2:12.78	2008-09-11	Beijing	China

==== Heats ====
Fifteen swimmers will take part, with the top eight progressing to the final.

Rank	Heat	Lane	Athlete	Class	Result	Notes
1	1	4	Koehn Boyd (USA)	SM10	2:13.96	Q
2	2	5	Col Pearse (AUS)	SM10	2:15.95	Q
3	2	4	Stefano Raimondi (ITA)	SM10	2:16.72	Q
4	2	7	Fernando Lu (CAN)	SM10	2:16.73	Q
5	1	2	Alex Saffy (AUS)	SM10	2:17.66	Q
6	2	3	Riccardo Menciotti (ITA)	SM10	2:18.26	Q
7	2	6	Tomas Cordeiro (POR)	SM10	2:18.69	Q
8	1	5	Ihor Nimchenko (UKR)	SM10	2:19.01	Q
9	1	6	Alan Ogorzalek (POL)	SM10	2:20.25	
10	2	2	Alec Elliot (CAN)	SM10	2:22.31	
11	1	3	Artem Isaev (AIN)	SM10	2:22.70	
12	1	7	Tadeas Strasik (CZE)	SM10	2:23.07	
13	2	1	Zhang Yunxiang (CHN)	SM10	2:23.15	

==== Final ====
Rank	Lane	Athlete	Class	Result	Notes
1st place, gold medalist(s)	3	Stefano Raimondi (ITA)	SM10	2:10.28	
2nd place, silver medalist(s)	4	Koehn Boyd (USA)	SM10	2:10.85	
3rd place, bronze medalist(s)	8	Ihor Nimchenko (UKR)	SM10	2:12.67	
4	5	Col Pearse (AUS)	SM10	2:13.25	
5	2	Alex Saffy (AUS)	SM10	2:15.02	
6	7	Riccardo Menciotti (ITA)	SM10	2:15.46	
7	6	Fernando Lu (CAN)	SM10	2:18.05	
8	1	Tomas Cordeiro (POR)	SM10	2:21.93	

=== SM11 ===
The men's 200 metre individual medley SM 11 event was held on 24 September.

The relevant records at the beginning of the event were as follows:

Record	Athlete	Time	Date	City	Country
World	Rogier Dorsman (NED)	2:18.01	2024-04-24	Funchal	Portugal
Championship	Danylo Chufarov (UKR)	2:18.16	2023-08-03	Manchester	United Kingdom
Americas	John Morgan (USA)	2:22.97	1992-09-05	Barcelona	Spain
Asian	Yang Bozun (CHN)	2:22.40	2012-09-08	London	United Kingdom
European	Rogier Dorsman (NED)	2:18.01	2024-04-24	Funchal	Portugal

==== Heats ====
Nine swimmers will take part, with the top eight progressing to the final

Rank	Heat	Lane	Athlete	Class	Result	Notes
1	1	3	Rogier Dorsman (NED)	SM11	2:21.87	Q
2	1	3	David Kratochvil (CZE)	SM11	2:28.08	Q
3	1	5	Danylo Chufarov (UKR)	SM11	2:28.65	Q
4	1	2	Albert Gelis (ESP)	SM11	2:31.30	Q
5	1	6	Mykhailo Serbin (UKR)	SM11	2:34.62	Q
6	1	8	Alex Kozlowski (POL)	SM11	2:37.30	Q
7	1	7	José Cantero (ESP)	SM11	2:38.02	Q
8	1	1	Marco Meneses (POR)	SM11	2:38.36	Q
9	1	0	Himanshu Nandal (IND)	SM11	2:43.46	

==== Final ====
Rank	Lane	Athlete	Class	Result	Notes
1st place, gold medalist(s)	3	Danylo Chufarov (UKR)	SM11	2:19.34	
2nd place, silver medalist(s)	4	David Kratochvil (CZE)	SM11	2:19.88	
3rd place, bronze medalist(s)	5	Rogier Dorsman (NED)	SM11	2:21.73	
4	6	Albert Gelis (ESP)	SM11	2:26.63	
5	2	Mykhailo Serbin (UKR)	SM11	2:28.61	
6	1	José Cantero (ESP)	SM11	2:34.65	
7	8	Marco Meneses (POR)	SM11	2:35.49	
8	7	Alex Kozlowski (POL)	SM11	2:36.48	

=== SM13 ===
The men's 200 metre individual medley SM13 event was held on 27 September. Eleven swimmers will take part, with the top eight progressing to the final. The event was open to SM12 classified swimmers.

The relevant records at the beginning of the event were as follows:

Record	Athlete	Time	Date	City	Country
SM12
World	Danylo Chufarov (UKR)	2:10.87	2013-08-14	Montreal	Canada
Championship	Danylo Chufarov (UKR)	2:10.87	2013-08-14	Montreal	Canada
African	Hendri Herbst (RSA)	2:52.11	2010-08-15	Eindhoven	Netherlands
Americas	Tucker Dupree (USA)	2:18.67	2010-08-15	Eindhoven	Netherlands
Asian	Dmitriy Horlin (UZB)	2:14.20	2018-10-08	Jakarta	Indonesia
European	Danylo Chufarov (UKR)	2:10.87	2013-08-14	Montreal	Canada
Oceania	Braedan Jason (AUS)	2:19.29	2019-02-17	Melbourne	Australia
SM13
World	Ihar Boki (IPC)	2:02.03	2024-09-03	Paris	France
Championship	Ihar Boki (BLR)	2:03.79	2013-08-12	Montreal	Canada
African	Nathan Hendricks (RSA)	2:17.15	2024-09-03	Paris	France
Americas	David Henry Abrahams (USA)	2:12.67	2021-08-30	Tokyo	Japan
Asian	Kirill Pankov (UZB)	2:15.30	2015-07-14	Glasgow	United Kingdom
European	Ihar Boki (IPC)	2:02.03	2024-09-03	Paris	France
Oceania	Sean Russo (AUS)	2:14.43	2013-08-12	Montreal	Canada

==== Heats ====
Rank	Heat	Lane	Athlete	Class	Result	Notes
1	1	4	Egor Shchitkovskii (AIN)	SM13	2:13.00	Q
2	1	5	Timofei Guk (AIN)	SM12	2:15.73	Q
3	2	5	Taliso Engel (GER)	SM13	2:16.63	Q
4	2	3	Nathan Hendricks (RSA)	SM13	2:17.37	Q
5	2	4	Alex Portal (FRA)	SM13	2:17.75	Q
6	2	2	Stepan Lisitskii (AIN)	SM13	2:18.60	Q
7	1	3	Genki Saito (JPN)	SM13	2:18.66	Q
8	2	6	Philip Hebmueller (GER)	SM13	2:20.85	Q
9	2	7	Yauheni Kavalionak (AIN)	SM13	2:22.07	
10	1	2	Alex Villarejo Martin (ESP)	SM12	2:25.90	

==== Final ====
Rank	Lane	Athlete	Class	Result	Notes
1st place, gold medalist(s)	4	Egor Shchitkovskii (AIN)	SM13	2:06.07	
2nd place, silver medalist(s)	2	Alex Portal (FRA)	SM13	2:09.73	
3rd place, bronze medalist(s)	5	TImofei Guk (AIN)	SM12	2:11.47	
4	3	Taliso Engel (GER)	SM13	2:11.67	
5	7	Stepan Lisitskii (AIN)	SM13	2:16.20	
6	6	Nathan Hendricks (RSA)	SM13	2:16.55	AF
7	1	Genki Saito (JPN)	SM13	2:17.99	
8	8	Philip Hebmueller (GER)	SM13	2:20.61	

=== SM14 ===
The men's 200 metre individual medley SM14 event was held on 25 September.

The relevant records at the beginning of the event were as follows:

Record	Athlete	Time	Date	City	Country
World	Nicholas Bennett (CAN)	2:05.97	2024-05-17	Toronto	Canada
Championship	Gabriel Bandeira (BRA)	2:07.50	2022-06-16	Funchal	Portugal
African	Record Mark (IPC)	2:12.36			
Americas	Nicholas Bennett (CAN)	2:05.97	2024-05-17	Toronto	Canada
Asian	Dai Tokairin (JPN)	2:08.16	2019-09-14	London	United Kingdom
European	Dmytro Vanzenko (UKR)	2:07.98	2024-04-25	Funchal	Portugal
Oceania	Ricky Betar (AUS)	2:08.69	2024-09-04	Paris	France

==== Heats ====
Fifteen swimmers will take part, with the top eight progressing to the final.

Rank	Heat	Lane	Athlete	Time	Note
1	1	4	Rhys Darbey (GBR)	2:08.09	Q
2	2	4	Nicholas Bennett (CAN)	2:08.17	Q
3	2	5	Gabriel Bandeira (BRA)	2:10.01	Q
4	2	3	Cameron Vearncombe (GBR)	2:11.23	Q
5	2	6	Rodion Berdnik (AIN)	2:11.62	Q
6	1	3	Naohide Yamaguchi (JPN)	2:12.10	Q
7	1	5	Ricky Betar (AUS)	2:12.89	Q
8	2	2	Dylan Broom (GBR)	2:13.78	Q
9	1	2	Arthur Xavier Ribeiro (BRA)	2:14.36	R
10	1	6	Vasyl Krainyk (UKR)	2:14.89	R
11	2	1	Asher Smith-Franklin (NZL)	2:15.91	
12	1	1	Shunya Murakami (JPN)	2:16.00	
13	2	7	Natirat Meeprom (THA)	2:17.10	
14	2	8	Nader Khalili (FIN)	2:17.60	
15	1	7	Brutos De Oliveira (BRA)	2:23.33	

==== Final ====
Rank	Lane	Athlete	Time	Note
1st place, gold medalist(s)	6	Gabriel Bandeira (BRA)	2:05.40	WR
2nd place, silver medalist(s)	4	Rhys Darbey (GBR)	2:05.84	
3rd place, bronze medalist(s)	5	Nicholas Bennett (CAN)	2:06.30	
4	2	Naohide Yamaguchi (JPN)	2:08.20	
5	1	Ricky Betar (AUS)	2:10.08	
6	3	Cameron Vearncombe (GBR)	2:11.32	
7	7	Rodion Berdnik (AIN)	2:11.42	
8	8	Dylan Broom (GBR)	2:13.00	
