= Swimming at the 2020 Summer Paralympics – Men's 200 metre individual medley SM13 =

Men's 200 metre individual medley SM13 at the XVI Paralympic Games
- Venue: Tokyo Aquatics Centre
- Dates: 30 August 2021
- Competitors: 15 from 12 nations

Medalists
1st place, gold medalist(s)		Ihar Boki	Belarus
2nd place, silver medalist(s)		Alex Portal	France
3rd place, bronze medalist(s)		Thomas van Wanrooij	Netherlands

The men's 200 metre individual medley SM13 event at the 2020 Paralympic Games took place on 30 August 2021, at the Tokyo Aquatics Centre.

== Heats ==
The swimmers with the top eight times, regardless of heat, advanced to the final.

Rank	Heat	Lane	Name	Nationality	Time	Notes
1	2	4	Ihar Boki	Belarus	2:08.24	Q
2	2	6	Thomas van Wanrooij	Netherlands	2:11.12	Q
3	1	4	Alex Portal	France	2:12.05	Q
4	1	5	Kyrylo Garashchenko	Ukraine	2:14.03	Q
5	1	5	David Henry Abrahams	United States	2:14.23	Q, AM
6	1	3	Taliso Engel	Germany	2:15.66	Q
7	2	3	Vladimir Sotnikov	RPC	2:17.40	Q
8	1	2	Danylo Chufarov	Ukraine	2:17.48	Q
9	2	2	Genki Saito	Japan	2:18.24	
10	2	7	Firdavsbek Musabekov	Uzbekistan	2:18.78	
11	1	1	Artur Saifutdinov	RPC	2:21.45	
12	1	1	Maksim Nikiforov	RPC	2:23.13	
13	2	7	Douglas Matera	Brazil	2:23.53	
14	1	7	Nurdaulet Zhumagali	Kazakhstan	2:25.92	
	2	8	Maksim Vashkevich	Belarus	DNS	

== Final ==
200m individual medley final
Rank	Lane	Name	Nationality	Time	Notes
1st place, gold medalist(s)	4	Ihar Boki	Belarus	2:02.70	WR
2nd place, silver medalist(s)	3	Alex Portal	France	2:09.92	
3rd place, bronze medalist(s)	5	Thomas van Wanrooij	Netherlands	2:10.79	
4	2	David Henry Abrahams	United States	2:12.67	AM
5	6	Kyrylo Garashchenko	Ukraine	2:13.71	
6	7	Taliso Engel	Germany	2:14.05	
7	1	Vladimir Sotnikov	RPC	2:14.38	
8	8	Danylo Chufarov	Ukraine	2:15.15	
