= Swimming at the 2020 Summer Paralympics – Men's 100 metre breaststroke =

The Men's 100 metre breaststroke swimming events for the 2020 Summer Paralympics took place at the Tokyo Aquatics Centre from August 26 to September 1, 2021. A total of ten events were contested over this distance.

== Schedule ==
H	Heats	½	Semifinals	F	Final

Date	Thu 26		Fri 27		Sat 28		Sun 29		Mon 30		Tue 31		Wed 1	
Event	M	E	M	E	M	E	M	E	M	E	M	E	M	E
SB4 100m							H	F						
SB5 100m					H	F								
SB6 100m					H	F								
SB7 100m													H	F
SB8 100m	H	F												
SB9 100m	H	F												
SB11 100m													H	F
SB12 100m													H	F
SB13 100m													H	F
SB14 100m							H	F						

== Medal summary ==
The following is a summary of the medals awarded across all 100 metre breaststroke events.

Classification	Gold		Silver		Bronze	
SB4	Dmitrii Cherniaev; RPC	1:31.96 WR	Moisés Fuentes; Colombia	1:35.86	Antonios Tsapatakis; Greece	1:40.20
SB5	Andrei Granichka; RPC	1:25.13 WR	Antoni Ponce; Spain	1:26.53	Li Junsheng; China	1:29.01
SB6	Ievgenii Bogodaiko; Ukraine	1:20.13	Nelson Crispín; Colombia	1:20.19	Matt Levy; Australia	1:21.10
SB7	Carlos Serrano Zárate; Colombia	1:12.01	Egor Efrosinin; RPC	1:16.43	Blake Cochrane; Australia	1:16.97
SB8	Andrei Kalina; RPC	1:07.24	Oscar Salguero; Spain	1:09.91	Yang Guanglong; China	1:10.48
SB9	Stefano Raimondi; Italy	1:05.35	Artem Isaev; RPC	1:07.45	Dmitrii Bartasinskii; RPC	1:08.06
SB11	Rogier Dorsman; Netherlands	1:11.22	Keiichi Kimura; Japan	1:11.78	Yang Bozun; China	1:12.62
SB12	Vali Israfilov; Azerbaijan	1:04.86 PR	Oleksii Fedyna; Ukraine	1:05.62	Artur Saifutdinov; RPC	1:05.76
SB13	Taliso Engel; Germany	1:02.97 WR	David Henry Abrahams; United States	1:04.38	Nurdaulet Zhumagali; Kazakhstan	1:05.20
SB14	Naohide Yamaguchi; Japan	1:03.77 WR	Jake Michel; Australia	1:04.28	Scott Quin; Great Britain	1:05.91

== Results ==
The following were the results of the finals only of each of the Men's 100 metre breaststroke events in each of the classifications. Further details of each event, including where appropriate heats and semi finals results, are available on that event's dedicated page.

=== SB4 ===
The SB4 category is for swimmers who have hemiplegia, paraplegia or short stature.

The final in this classification took place on 29 August 2021:

Rank	Lane	Name	Nationality	Time	Notes
1st place, gold medalist(s)	4	Dmitrii Cherniaev	RPC	1:31.96	WR
2nd place, silver medalist(s)	5	Moisés Fuentes	Colombia	1:35.86	
3rd place, bronze medalist(s)	3	Antonios Tsapatakis	Greece	1:40.20	
4	6	Aleksandr Molkov	RPC	1:41.27	
5	1	Ruan Jingsong	China	1:44.13	
6	2	Nicolás Rivero	Argentina	1:46.52	
7	7	Miguel Ángel Rincón	Colombia	1:46.74	
8	8	Francesco Bocciardo	Italy	1:51.06	

=== SB5 ===
The SB5 category is for swimmers who have short stature, arm amputations, or some form of coordination problem on one side of their body.

The final in this classification took place on 28 August 2021:

Rank	Lane	Name	Nationality	Time	Notes
1st place, gold medalist(s)	5	Andrei Granichka	RPC	1:25.13	WR
2nd place, silver medalist(s)	4	Antoni Ponce Bertran	Spain	1:26.53	
3rd place, bronze medalist(s)	6	Li Junsheng	China	1:29.01	
4	3	Iurii Luchkin	RPC	1:31.34	
5	2	Leo McCrea	Switzerland	1:34.29	
6	1	Thanh Hai Do	Vietnam	1:35.68	
7	7	Roberto Alcalde Rodriguez	Brazil	1:36.75	
8	8	Ivo Rocha	Portugal	1:44.65	

=== SB6 ===
The SB6 category is for swimmers who have one leg and one arm amputation on opposite side, or paralysis on one side of their body. These swimmers have full control of their arms and trunk but variable function in their legs.

The final in this classification took place on 28 August 2021:

Rank	Lane	Name	Nationality	Time	Notes
1st place, gold medalist(s)	6	Ievgenii Bogodaiko	Ukraine	1:20.13	
2nd place, silver medalist(s)	4	Nelson Crispín	Colombia	1:20.19	
3rd place, bronze medalist(s)	5	Matthew Levy	Australia	1:21.10	
4	3	Yang Hong	China	1:22.07	
5	1	Jia Hongguang	China	1:23.67	
6	7	Rudy Garcia-Tolson	United States	1:24.64	
7	8	Andrii Trusov	Ukraine	1:24.85	
8	2	Tomotaro Nakamura	Japan	1:25.00	

=== SB7 ===
The SB7 category is for swimmers who have a single amputation, or restrictive movement in their hip, knee and ankle joints.

The final in this classification took place on 1 September 2021:

Rank	Lane	Name	Nationality	Time	Notes
1st place, gold medalist(s)	4	Carlos Serrano Zárate	Colombia	1:12.01	PR
2nd place, silver medalist(s)	5	Egor Efrosinin	RPC	1:16.43	ER
3rd place, bronze medalist(s)	3	Blake Cochrane	Australia	1:16.97	
4	2	Jesse Aungles	Australia	1:22.06	
5	6	Christian Sadie	South Africa	1:24.49	
6	7	Ericsson Alejandro Bermudez Sosa	Venezuela	1:27.83	
-	1	Suyash Narayan Jadhav	India	DSQ	

=== SB8 ===
The SB8 category is for swimmers who have joint restrictions in one leg, or double below-the-knee amputations.

The final in this classification took place on 26 August 2021:

Rank	Lane	Name	Nationality	Time	Notes
1st place, gold medalist(s)	4	Andrei Kalina	RPC	1:07.24	
2nd place, silver medalist(s)	5	Oscar Salguero Galisteo	Spain	1:09.91	
3rd place, bronze medalist(s)	7	Yang Guanglong	China	1:10.48	
4	3	Tim van Duuren	Netherlands	1:10.55	
5	6	Daniil Smirnov	RPC	1:11.45	
6	2	Xu Haijiao	China	1:11.55	
7	8	Timothy Disken	Australia	1:11.81	
8	1	Vicente Enrique Almonacid Heyl	Chile	1:12.69	

=== SB9 ===
The SB9 category is for swimmers who have minor physical impairments, for example, loss of one hand.

The final in this classification took place on 26 August 2021:

Rank	Lane	Name	Nationality	Time	Notes
1st place, gold medalist(s)	4	Stefano Raimondi	Italy	1:05.35	
2nd place, silver medalist(s)	5	Artem Isaev	RPC	1:07.45	
3rd place, bronze medalist(s)	6	Dmitrii Bartasinskii	RPC	1:08.06	
4	8	Dmitry Grigoryev	RPC	1:08.56	
5	7	Ruan Felipe Lima de Souza	Brazil	1:10.99	
6	3	James Leroux	Canada	1:11.49	
7	1	Tadeas Strasik	Czech Republic	1:13.19	
8	2	Fredrik Solberg	Norway	1:14.05	

=== SB11 ===
The SB11 category is for swimmers who have severe visual impairments and have very low or no light perception, such as blindness, they are required to wear blackened goggles to compete. They use tappers when competing in swimming events.

The final in this classification took place on 1 September 2021:

Rank	Lane	Name	Nationality	Time	Notes
1st place, gold medalist(s)	4	Rogier Dorsman	Netherlands	1:11.22	
2nd place, silver medalist(s)	3	Keiichi Kimura	Japan	1:11.78	
3rd place, bronze medalist(s)	5	Yang Bozun	China	1:12.62	
4	7	Viktor Smyrnov	Ukraine	1:15.78	
5	6	Edgaras Matakas	Lithuania	1:16.27	
6	2	Leider Lemus	Colombia	1:19.47	
7	1	Federico Bassani	Italy	1:20.57	
8	8	Brayan Triana	Colombia	1:26.16	

=== SB12 ===
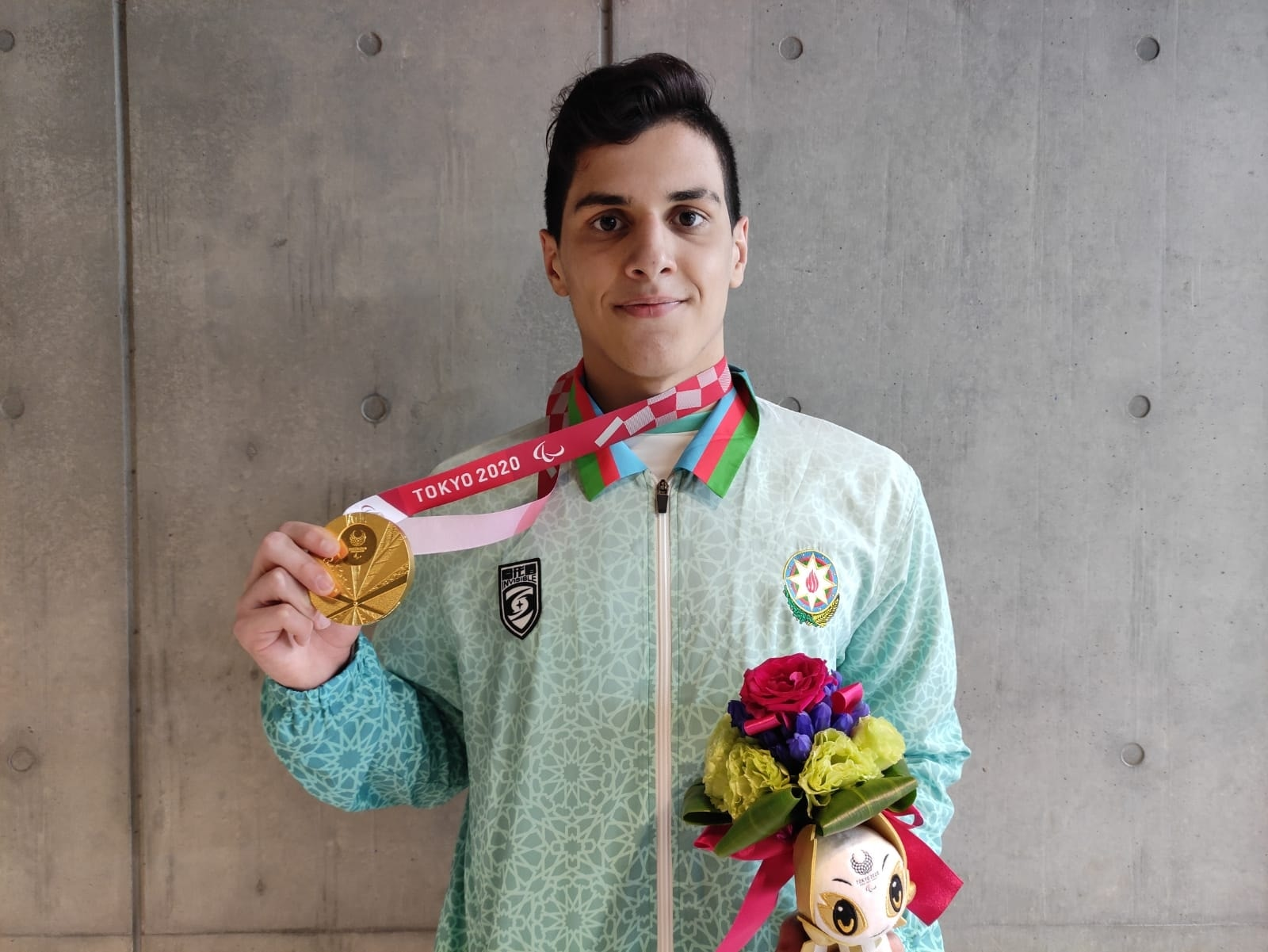
Vali Israfilov (Azerbaijan) with his gold medal

The SB12 category is for swimmers who have moderate visual impairment and have a visual field of less than 5 degrees radius. They are required to wear blackened goggles to compete. They may wish to use a tapper.

The final in this classification took place on 1 September 2021:

Rank	Lane	Name	Nationality	Time	Notes
1st place, gold medalist(s)	5	Vali Israfilov	Azerbaijan	1:04.86	
2nd place, silver medalist(s)	4	Oleksii Fedyna	Ukraine	1:05.62	
3rd place, bronze medalist(s)	6	Artur Saifutdinov	RPC	1:05.76	
4	3	Uladzimir Izotau	Belarus	1:07.11	
5	2	Sergii Klippert	Ukraine	1:11.24	
6	8	Danylo Chufarov	Ukraine	1:11.67	
7	1	Daniel Giraldo Correa	Colombia	1:14.61	
8	7	Sergey Punko	RPC	1:14.87	

=== SB13 ===
The SB13 category is for swimmers who have minor visual impairment and have high visual acuity. They are required to wear blackened goggles to compete. They may wish to use a tapper.

The final in this classification took place on 1 September 2021:

Rank	Lane	Name	Nationality	Time	Notes
1st place, gold medalist(s)	4	Taliso Engel	Germany	1:02.97	WR
2nd place, silver medalist(s)	5	David Henry Abrahams	United States	1:04.38	
3rd place, bronze medalist(s)	3	Nurdaulet Zhumagali	Kazakhstan	1:05.20	
4	2	Firdavsbek Musabekov	Uzbekistan	1:05.85	
5	6	Ihar Boki	Belarus	1:05.90	
6	7	Thomas van Wanrooij	Netherlands	1:06.75	
7	1	Maksim Nikiforov	RPC	1:07.92	
8	8	Nurali Sovetkanov	Kazakhstan	1:10.99	

=== SB14 ===
The SB14 category is for swimmers who have an intellectual impairment.

The final in this classification took place on 29 August 2021:

Rank	Lane	Name	Nationality	Time	Notes
1st place, gold medalist(s)	4	Naohide Yamaguchi	Japan	1:03.77	WR
2nd place, silver medalist(s)	5	Jake Michel	Australia	1:04.28	
3rd place, bronze medalist(s)	3	Scott Quin	Great Britain	1:05.91	
4	2	Vasyl Krainyk	Ukraine	1:06.66	
5	6	Nicholas Bennett	Canada	1:06.94	
6	8	Marc Evers	Netherlands	1:07.11	
7	1	Joao Pedro Brutos de Oliveira	Brazil	1:07.84	
8	7	Conner Morrison	Great Britain	1:08.01	
