= Swimming at the 2020 Summer Paralympics – Men's 200 metre individual medley =

The Men's 200 metre individual medley swimming events for the 2020 Summer Paralympics took place at the Tokyo Aquatics Centre from August 26 to September 3, 2021. A total of eight events were contested over this distance.

== Schedule ==
H	Heats	½	Semifinals	F	Final

Date	Thu 26		Fri 27		Sat 28		Sun 29		Mon 30		Tue 31		Wed 1		Thu 2		Fri 3	
Event	M	E	M	E	M	E	M	E	M	E	M	E	M	E	M	E	M	E
SM6 200m	H	F																
SM7 200m			H	F														
SM8 200m					H	F												
SM9 200m													H	F				
SM10 200m																	H	F
SM11 200m									H	F								
SM13 200m									H	F								
SM14 200m											H	F						

== Medal summary ==
The following is a summary of the medals awarded across all 200 metre individual medley events.

Classification	Gold		Silver		Bronze	
SM6	Nelson Crispín; Colombia	2:38.12 WR	Andrei Granichka; RPC	2:40.92	Jia Hongguang; China	2:41.29
SM7	Mark Malyar; Israel	2:29.01 WR	Andrii Trusov; Ukraine	2:29.99	Carlos Serrano Zárate; Colombia	2:31.58
SM8	Denys Dubrov; Ukraine	2:20.96	Xu Haijiao; China	2:21.06	Yang Guanglong; China	2:21.53
SM9	Andrei Kalina; RPC	2:14.90	Timothy Hodge; Australia	2:15.42	Ugo Didier; France	2:17.15
SM10	Maksym Krypak; Ukraine	2:05.68 PR	Stefano Raimondi; Italy	2:07.68	Bas Takken; Netherlands	2:11.39
SM11	Rogier Dorsman; Netherlands	2:19.02 WR	Mykhailo Serbin; Ukraine	2:27.97	Uchu Tomita; Japan	2:28.44
SM13	Ihar Boki; Belarus	2:02.70	Alex Portal; France	2:09.92	Thomas van Wanrooij; Netherlands	2:10.79
SM14	Reece Dunn; Great Britain	2:08.02 WR	Gabriel Bandeira; Brazil	2:09.56	Vasyl Krainyk; Ukraine	2:09.92

== Results ==
The following were the results of the finals only of each of the Men's 200 metre individual medley events in each of the classifications. Further details of each event, including where appropriate heats and semi finals results, are available on that event's dedicated page.

=== SM6 ===
The SM6 category is for swimmers who have short stature, arm amputations, or some form of coordination problem on one side of their body.

The final in this classification took place on 26 August 2021:

Rank	Lane	Name	Nationality	Time	Notes
1st place, gold medalist(s)	4	Nelson Crispín	Colombia	2:38.12	WR
2nd place, silver medalist(s)	5	Andrei Granichka	RPC	2:40.92	
3rd place, bronze medalist(s)	3	Jia Hongguang	China	2:41.29	
4	2	Yang Hong	China	2:41.34	
5	8	Wang Jingang	China	2:43.74	
6	7	Talisson Glock	Brazil	2:45.17	
7	6	Juan Jose Gutierrez Bermudez	Mexico	2:48.79	
8	1	Zach Shattuck	United States	2:52.52	

=== SM7 ===
The SM7 category is for swimmers who have one leg and one arm amputation on opposite side, or paralysis on one side of their body. These swimmers have full control of their arms and trunk but variable function in their legs.

The final in this classification took place on 27 August 2021:

Rank	Lane	Name	Nationality	Time	Notes
1st place, gold medalist(s)	4	Mark Malyar	Israel	2:29.01	WR
2nd place, silver medalist(s)	3	Andrii Trusov	Ukraine	2:29.99	
3rd place, bronze medalist(s)	2	Carlos Serrano Zárate	Colombia	2:31.58	
4	5	Inaki Basiloff	Argentina	2:31.62	
5	6	Evan Austin	United States	2:32.53	
6	7	Christian Sadie	South Africa	2:35.94	AF
7	1	Rudy Garcia-Tolson	United States	2:39.52	
8	8	Pipo Carlomagno	Argentina	2:41.55	

=== SM8 ===
The SM8 category is for swimmers who have a single amputation, or restrictive movement in their hip, knee and ankle joints.

The final in this classification took place on 28 August 2021:

Rank	Lane	Name	Nationality	Time	Notes
1st place, gold medalist(s)	4	Denys Dubrov	Ukraine	2:20.96	
2nd place, silver medalist(s)	2	Xu Haijiao	China	2:21.06	
3rd place, bronze medalist(s)	1	Yang Guanglong	China	2:21.53	
4	5	Robert Griswold	United States	2:24.97	
5	7	Liu Fengqi	China	2:26.94	
6	3	Dimosthenis Michalentzakis	Greece	2:27.57	
7	6	Jesse Aungles	Australia	2:29.48	
8	8	Diogo Cancela	Portugal	2:33.36	

=== SM9 ===
The SM9 category is for swimmers who have joint restrictions in one leg, or double below-the-knee amputations.

The final in this classification took place on 1 September 2021:

Rank	Lane	Name	Nationality	Time	Notes
1st place, gold medalist(s)	6	Andrei Kalina	RPC	2:14.90	ER
2nd place, silver medalist(s)	4	Timothy Hodge	Australia	2:15.42	
3rd place, bronze medalist(s)	3	Ugo Didier	France	2:17.15	
4	5	Yahor Shchalkanau	Belarus	2:18.40	
5	7	Jonas Kesnar	Czech Republic	2:23.00	
6	2	Oscar Salguero Galisteo	Spain	2:23.92	
7	1	Jesse Reynolds	New Zealand	2:25.62	
8	8	Takuro Yamada	Japan	2:27.18	

=== SM10 ===
The SM10 category is for swimmers who have minor physical impairments, for example, loss of one hand.

The final in this classification took place on 3 September 2021:

Rank	Lane	Name	Nationality	Time	Notes
1st place, gold medalist(s)	4	Maksym Krypak	Ukraine	2:05.68	PR
2nd place, silver medalist(s)	5	Stefano Raimondi	Italy	2:07.68	
3rd place, bronze medalist(s)	3	Bas Takken	Netherlands	2:11.39	
4	6	Col Pearse	Australia	2:14.20	
5	2	Alec Elliot	Canada	2:15.26	
6	7	Alan Ogorzalek	Poland	2:18.97	
7	8	Artem Isaev	RPC	2:20.37	
8	1	Tadeas Strasik	Czech Republic	2:23.26	

=== SM11 ===
The SM11 category is for swimmers who have severe visual impairments and have very low or no light perception, such as blindness, they are required to wear blackened goggles to compete. They use tappers when competing in swimming events.

The final in this classification took place on 30 August 2021:

Rank	Lane	Name	Nationality	Time	Notes
1st place, gold medalist(s)	4	Rogier Dorsman	Netherlands	2:19.02	WR
2nd place, silver medalist(s)	7	Mykhailo Serbin	Ukraine	2:27.97	
3rd place, bronze medalist(s)	6	Uchu Tomita	Japan	2:28.44	
4	2	Viktor Smyrnov	Ukraine	2:28.97	
5	3	Keiichi Kimura	Japan	2:29.87	
6	5	Yang Bozun	China	2:29.95	
7	1	Wendell Belarmino Pereira	Brazil	2:30.17	
8	8	Már Gunnarsson	Iceland	2:37.43	

=== SM13 ===
The SM13 category is for swimmers who have minor visual impairment and have high visual acuity. They are required to wear blackened goggles to compete. They may wish to use a tapper.

The final in this classification took place on 30 August 2021:

Rank	Lane	Name	Nationality	Time	Notes
1st place, gold medalist(s)	4	Ihar Boki	Belarus	2:02.70	WR
2nd place, silver medalist(s)	3	Alex Portal	France	2:09.92	
3rd place, bronze medalist(s)	5	Thomas van Wanrooij	Netherlands	2:10.79	
4	2	David Henry Abrahams	United States	2:12.67	AM
5	6	Kyrylo Garashchenko	Ukraine	2:13.71	
6	7	Taliso Engel	Germany	2:14.05	
7	1	Vladimir Sotnikov	RPC	2:14.38	
8	8	Danylo Chufarov	Ukraine	2:15.15	

=== SM14 ===
The SM14 category is for swimmers who have an intellectual impairment.

The final in this classification took place on 31 August 2021:

Rank	Lane	Name	Nationality	Time	Notes
1st place, gold medalist(s)	5	Reece Dunn	Great Britain	2:08.02	WR
2nd place, silver medalist(s)	7	Gabriel Bandeira	Brazil	2:09.56	AM
3rd place, bronze medalist(s)	4	Vasyl Krainyk	Ukraine	2:09.92	
4	8	Dai Tokairin	Japan	2:11.29	
5	2	Mikhail Kuliabin	RPC	2:12.00	
6	1	Robert Isak Jonsson	Iceland	2:12.89	
7	6	Nicholas Bennett	Canada	2:13.21	
8	3	Marc Evers	Netherlands	2:13.25	
