= 2023 World Para Swimming Championships – Men's 100 metre breaststroke =

The men's 100m breaststroke events at the 2023 World Para Swimming Championships were held at the Manchester Aquatics Centre between 31 July and 6 August.

== Medalists ==
Event	Gold	Silver	Bronze
SB4	Antonios Tsapatakis; Greece	Andrii Drapkin; Ukraine	Nicolas Rivero; Argentina
SB5	Antoni Ponce Bertran; Spain	Leo McCrea; Switzerland	Danylo Semenykhin; Ukraine
SB6	Yang Hong; China	Nelson Crispín; Colombia	Yevhenii Bohodaiko; Ukraine
SB8	Carlos Serrano Zárate; Colombia	Vicente Almonacid; Chile	Xu Haijiao; China
SB9	Stefano Raimondi; Italy	Maurice Wetekam; Germany	Hector Denayer; France
SB11	Rogier Dorsman; Netherlands	Danylo Chufarov; Ukraine	Keiichi Kimura; Japan
SB12	Vali Israfilov; Azerbaijan	Oleksii Fedyna; Ukraine	Martin Alex Villarejo; Spain
SB13	Taliso Engel; Germany	Nurdaulet Zhumagali; Kazakhstan	David Henry Abrahams; United States
SB14	Naohide Yamaguchi; Japan	Nicholas Bennett; Canada	Jake Michel; Australia

== Results ==
=== SB4 ===
Final

Eight swimmers from eight nations took part.

Rank	Name	Nation	Result	Notes
1st place, gold medalist(s)	Antonios Tsapatakis	Greece	1:39.53	
2nd place, silver medalist(s)	Andrii Drapkin	Ukraine	1:40.83	
3rd place, bronze medalist(s)	Manuel Bortuzzo	Argentina	1:46.08	
4	Miguel Ángel Rincón	Colombia	1:47.48	
5	Luis Huerta Poza	Italy	1:47.63	
6	Muhammad Nur Syaiful Zulkafli	Malaysia	1:48.13	
7	Luis Huerta Poza	Spain	1:54.98	
8	Zeyad Kahil	Egypt	1:56.35	

=== SB9 ===
Final

Eight swimmers from seven nations took part.

Rank	Name	Nation	Result	Notes
1st place, gold medalist(s)	Stefano Raimondi	Italy	1:06.36	
2nd place, silver medalist(s)	Maurice Wetekam	Germany	1:08.89	
3rd place, bronze medalist(s)	Hector Denayer	France	1:09.00	
4	Riccardo Menciotti	Italy	1:09.95	
5	James Leroux	Canada	1:10.29	
6	Ruan Felipe Lima de Souza	Brazil	1:10.55	
7	Fredrik Solberg	Norway	1:12.27	
8	Tomás Cordeiro	Portugal	1:13.15	
