= Swimming at the 2020 Summer Paralympics – Men's 100 metre breaststroke SB13 =

Men's 100 metre breaststroke SB13 at the XVI Paralympic Games
- Venue: Tokyo Aquatics Centre
- Dates: 1 September 2021
- Competitors: 10 from 9 nations

Medalists
1st place, gold medalist(s)		Taliso Engel	Germany
2nd place, silver medalist(s)		David Henry Abrahams	United States
3rd place, bronze medalist(s)		Nurdaulet Zhumagali	Kazakhstan

The men's 100 metre breaststroke SB13 event at the 2020 Paralympic Games took place on 1 September 2021, at the Tokyo Aquatics Centre.

== Heats ==
The swimmers with the top eight times, regardless of heat, advanced to the final.

Rank	Heat	Lane	Name	Nationality	Time	Notes
1	1	4	Taliso Engel	Germany	1:03.52	Q, WR
2	2	4	David Henry Abrahams	United States	1:04.04	Q, AM
3	2	5	Nurdaulet Zhumagali	Kazakhstan	1:04.97	Q
4	2	3	Ihar Boki	Belarus	1:05.86	Q
5	1	5	Firdavsbek Musabekov	Uzbekistan	1:06.42	Q
6	2	6	Thomas van Wanrooij	Netherlands	1:06.83	Q
7	1	3	Maksim Nikiforov	RPC	1:08.14	Q
8	1	6	Nuraii Sovetkanov	Kazakhstan	1:10.77	Q
9	1	2	Alex Portal	France	1:12.14	
10	2	2	Gerasimos Lignos	Germany	1:13.34	

== Final ==
100m breaststroke final
Rank	Lane	Name	Nationality	Time	Notes
1st place, gold medalist(s)	4	Taliso Engel	Germany	1:02.97	WR
2nd place, silver medalist(s)	5	David Henry Abrahams	United States	1:04.38	
3rd place, bronze medalist(s)	3	Nurdaulet Zhumagali	Kazakhstan	1:05.20	
4	2	Firdavsbek Musabekov	Uzbekistan	1:05.85	
5	6	Ihar Boki	Belarus	1:05.90	
6	7	Thomas van Wanrooij	Netherlands	1:06.75	
7	1	Maksim Nikiforov	RPC	1:07.92	
8	8	Nuraii Sovetkanov	Kazakhstan	1:10.99	
