= Swimming at the 2020 Summer Paralympics – Men's 100 metre breaststroke SB12 =

Men's 100 metre breaststroke SB11 at the XVI Paralympic Games
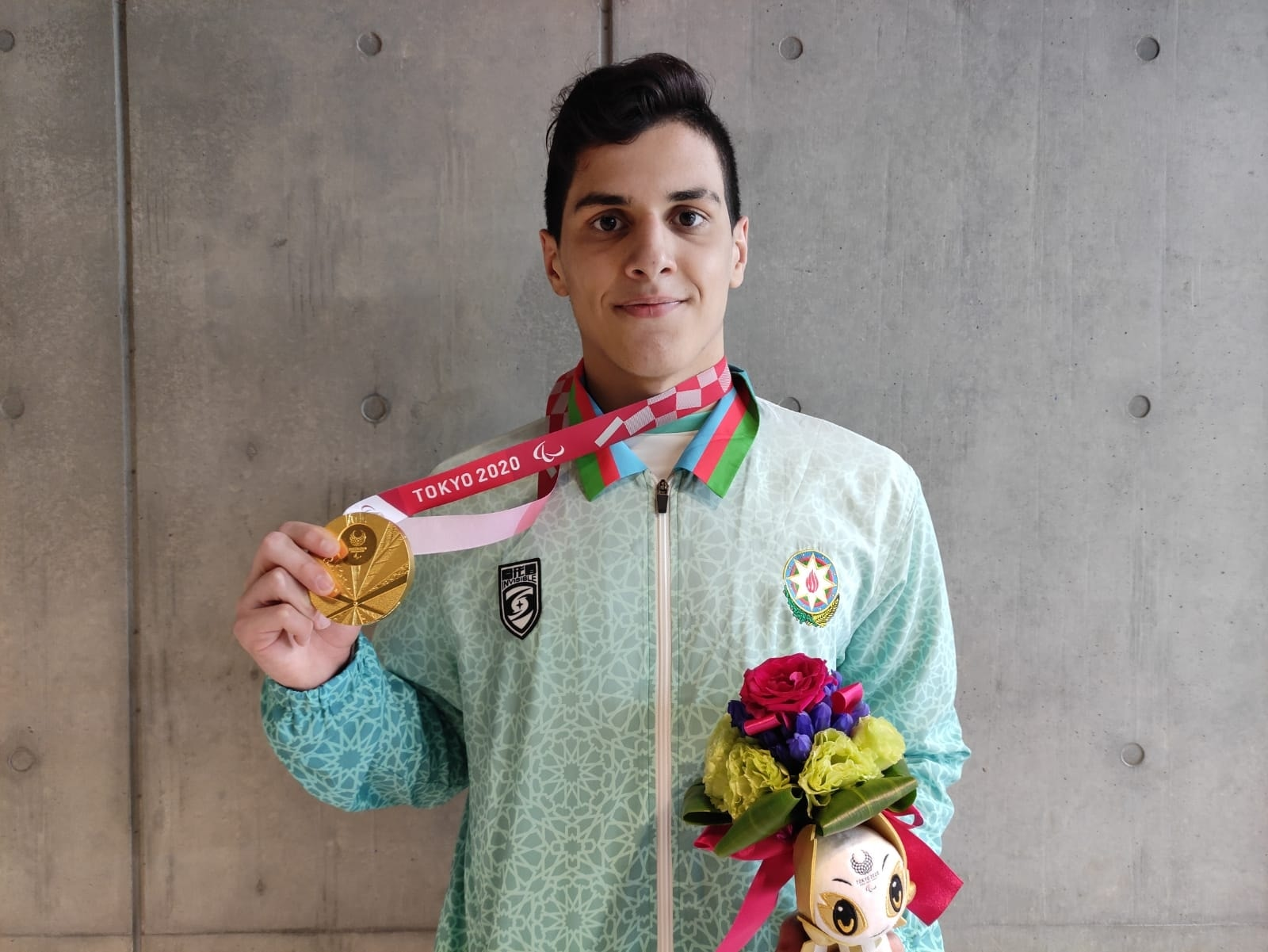
- Vali Israfilov with his gold medal
- Venue: Tokyo Aquatics Centre
- Dates: 1 September 2021
- Competitors: 8 from 5 nations

Medalists
1st place, gold medalist(s)		Vali Israfilov	Azerbaijan
2nd place, silver medalist(s)		Oleksii Fedyna	Ukraine
3rd place, bronze medalist(s)		Artur Saifutdinov	RPC

The Men's 100 metre breaststroke SB12 event at the 2020 Paralympic Games took place on 1 September 2021, at the Tokyo Aquatics Centre.

== Final ==
100m breaststroke final
Rank	Lane	Name	Nationality	Time	Notes
1st place, gold medalist(s)	5	Vali Israfilov	Azerbaijan	1:04.86	
2nd place, silver medalist(s)	4	Oleksii Fedyna	Ukraine	1:05.62	
3rd place, bronze medalist(s)	6	Artur Saifutdinov	RPC	1:05.76	
4	3	Uladzimir Izotau	Belarus	1:07.11	
5	2	Sergii Klippert	Ukraine	1:11.24	
6	8	Danylo Chufarov	Ukraine	1:11.67	
7	1	Daniel Giraldo Correa	Colombia	1:14.61	
8	7	Sergey Punko	RPC	1:14.87	
