= Bortuzzo =

Bortuzzo is an Italian surname. Notable people with the Bortuzzo surname include:

- Robert Bortuzzo (born 1989), Canadian professional ice hockey player in the NHL
- Manuel Mateo Bortuzzo (born 1999), Italian Paralympic swimmer
