= Swimming at the 2020 Summer Paralympics – Men's 100 metre breaststroke SB14 =

Men's 100 metre breaststroke SB14 at the XVI Paralympic Games
- Venue: Tokyo Aquatics Centre
- Dates: 29 August 2021
- Competitors: 13 from 11 nations

Medalists
1st place, gold medalist(s)		Naohide Yamaguchi	Japan
2nd place, silver medalist(s)		Jake Michel	Australia
3rd place, bronze medalist(s)		Scott Quin	Great Britain

The men's 100 metre breaststroke SB14 event at the 2020 Paralympic Games took place on 29 August 2021, at the Tokyo Aquatics Centre.

== Heats ==
The swimmers with the top eight times, regardless of heat, advanced to the final.

Rank	Heat	Lane	Name	Nationality	Time	Notes
1	2	4	Naohide Yamaguchi	Japan	1:04.45	Q, PR
2	1	4	Jake Michel	Australia	1:05.30	Q, OC
3	2	5	Scott Quin	Great Britain	1:06.20	Q
4	2	7	Nicholas Bennett	Canada	1:06.73	Q
5	2	6	Vasyl Krainyk	Ukraine	1:06.96	Q
6	1	6	Conner Morrison	Great Britain	1:08.01	Q
7	2	3	Joao Pedro Brutos de Oliveira	Brazil	1:08.32	Q
8	1	3	Marc Evers	Netherlands	1:08.43	Q
9	1	2	Mikhail Kuliabin	RPC	1:08.88	
10	1	7	Robert Isak Jonsson	Iceland	1:10.12	
10	2	2	Aymeric Parmentier	Belgium	1:10.12	
12	1	5	Gabriel Bandeira	Brazil	1:10.43	
13	2	1	Misha Palazzo	Italy	1:12.19	

== Final ==
Rank	Lane	Name	Nationality	Time	Notes
1st place, gold medalist(s)	4	Naohide Yamaguchi	Japan	1:03.77	WR
2nd place, silver medalist(s)	5	Jake Michel	Australia	1:04.28	
3rd place, bronze medalist(s)	3	Scott Quin	Great Britain	1:05.91	
4	2	Vasyl Krainyk	Ukraine	1:06.66	
5	6	Nicholas Bennett	Canada	1:06.94	
6	8	Marc Evers	Netherlands	1:07.11	
7	1	Joao Pedro Brutos de Oliveira	Brazil	1:07.84	
8	7	Conner Morrison	Great Britain	1:08.01	
