= Jake Michel =

Australian Paralympic swimmer

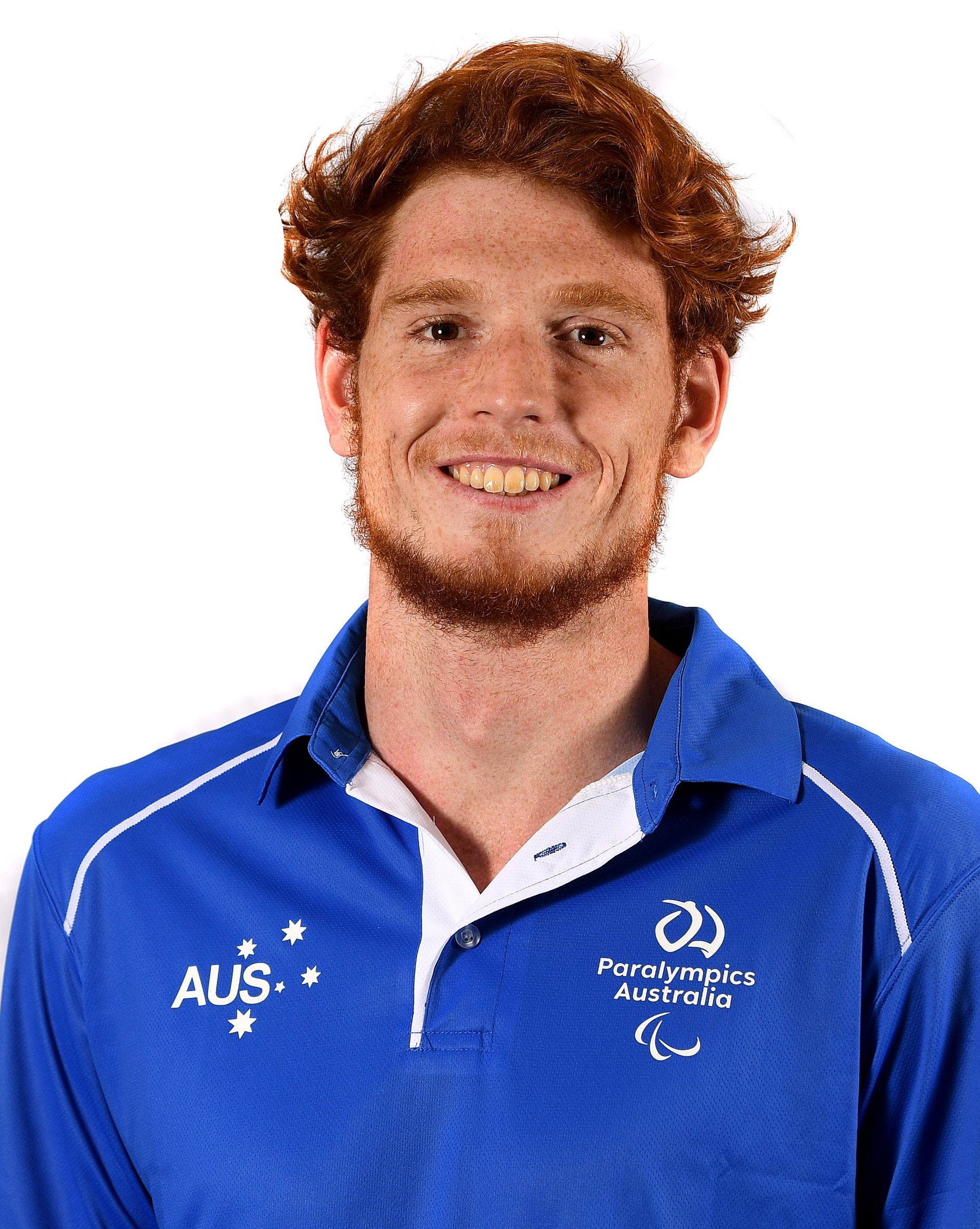

Personal information
- Nationality: Australian
- Born: 19 September 1997 (age 28)

Sport
- Country: Australia
- Sport: Paralympic swimming
- Disability class: SB14
- Club: Carina Leagues Clem Jones Swim Club
- Coached by: Brian Glass
Medal record
Paralympic swimming
Representing Australia
Paralympics Games
Silver medal – second place	2020 Tokyo	100 m breaststroke SB14
Silver medal – second place	2024 Paris	100 m breaststroke SB14
World Championships
Gold medal – first place	2023 Manchester	Mixed 4 × 100 m medley relay 49 pts
Silver medal – second place	2022 Madeira	100 m breaststroke SB14
Silver medal – second place	2022 Madeira	Mixed 4 × 100 m medley relay S14
Silver medal – second place	2025 Singapore	100 m breaststroke SB14
Bronze medal – third place	2023 Manchester	100 m breaststroke SB14

Jake Michel (born 19 September 1997) is an Australian Paralympic swimmer. At the 2020 Tokyo Paralympics and 2024 Paris Paralympics, he won the silver medal in the Men's 100 m Breaststroke SB14 . Michel has won medals at the World Para Swimming Championships.

== Personal ==
Michel was born on 19 September 1997 and has an intellectual disability. He is 6 ft 7 in tall. He attended Gumdale State School and Seton College in Brisbane.

== Swimming career ==
Michel is a breaststroke specialist and classified as SB14. His Paralympic swimming career started in 2014 and he was selected in Australian Dolphins’ development squad in 2018. His first international competition was the 2018 Pan Pacific Para-swimming Championships in Cairns, QLD, where he blitzed the field in the men's 100 m breaststroke SB4-9/11-13 heats but was not eligible to compete in the final due to being a development squad member. At the 2019 Australian Swimming Championships, in Adelaide, he won gold in a Men's 50 m and 100 m Breaststroke Multi-Class events.

At the 2019 World Para Swimming Championships in London he finished fourth in the men's 100 m breaststroke SB14 in an Oceania record. At the 2021 Australian Swimming Trials in Adelaide, his 1:04.35 set an Australian 100 m Breaststroke SB14 record.

At the 2020 Tokyo Paralympics, in his only event, Michel won the silver medal in the Men's 100 m breaststroke SB14. His time of 1:04.28 was less than one second behind the gold medal winner Naohide Yamaguchi of Japan.

At the 2022 World Para Swimming Championships, Madeira, Michel won two silver medals - Men's 100 m Breaststroke SB14 and Mixed 4 × 100 m medley relay S14. At the 2023 World Para Swimming Championships, Manchester, England, Michel won the silver medal in the Men's 100 m Breaststroke SB14 and the gold medal in the Mixed 4 × 100 m medley relay 49 pts.

Michel repeated his Tokyo Paralympics medal, by winning the silver medal in the Men's 100 m Breaststroke SB14 at the 2024 Paris Paralympics. At the 2025 World Para Swimming Championships in Singapore, he won the silver medal in the Men's 100 m Breaststroke SB14.
