= 2019 World Para Swimming Championships – Men's 100 metre breaststroke =

The men's 100m breaststroke events at the 2019 World Para Swimming Championships were held in the London Aquatics Centre at the Queen Elizabeth Olympic Park in London between 9–15 September.

== Medalists ==
Event	Gold	Silver	Bronze
SB4	Dmitrii Cherniaev; Russia	Moisés Fuentes; Colombia	Francesco Bocciardo; Italy
SB5	Andrei Granichka; Russia	Li Junsheng; China	Antoni Ponce Bertran; Spain
SB6	Nelson Crispín; Colombia	Yevhenii Bohodaiko; Ukraine	Yang Hong; China
SB7	Carlos Serrano Zárate; Colombia	Egor Efrosinin; Russia	Blake Cochrane; Australia
SB8	Andrei Kalina; Russia	Oscar Salguero Galisteo; Spain	Tim van Duuren; Netherlands
SB9	Stefano Raimondi; Italy	James Leroux; Canada	Dmitrii Bartasinskii; Russia
SB11	Yang Bozun; China	Rogier Dorsman; Netherlands	Keiichi Kimura; Japan
SB12	Oleksii Fedyna; Ukraine	Uladzimir Izotau; Belarus	Vali Israfilov; Azerbaijan
SB13	Taliso Engel; Germany	Firdavsbek Musabekov; Uzbekistan	Ihar Boki; Belarus
SB14	Naohide Yamaguchi; Japan	Scott Quin; Great Britain	Marc Evers; Netherlands
