= Antonios Tsapatakis =

Greek Paralympic swimmer

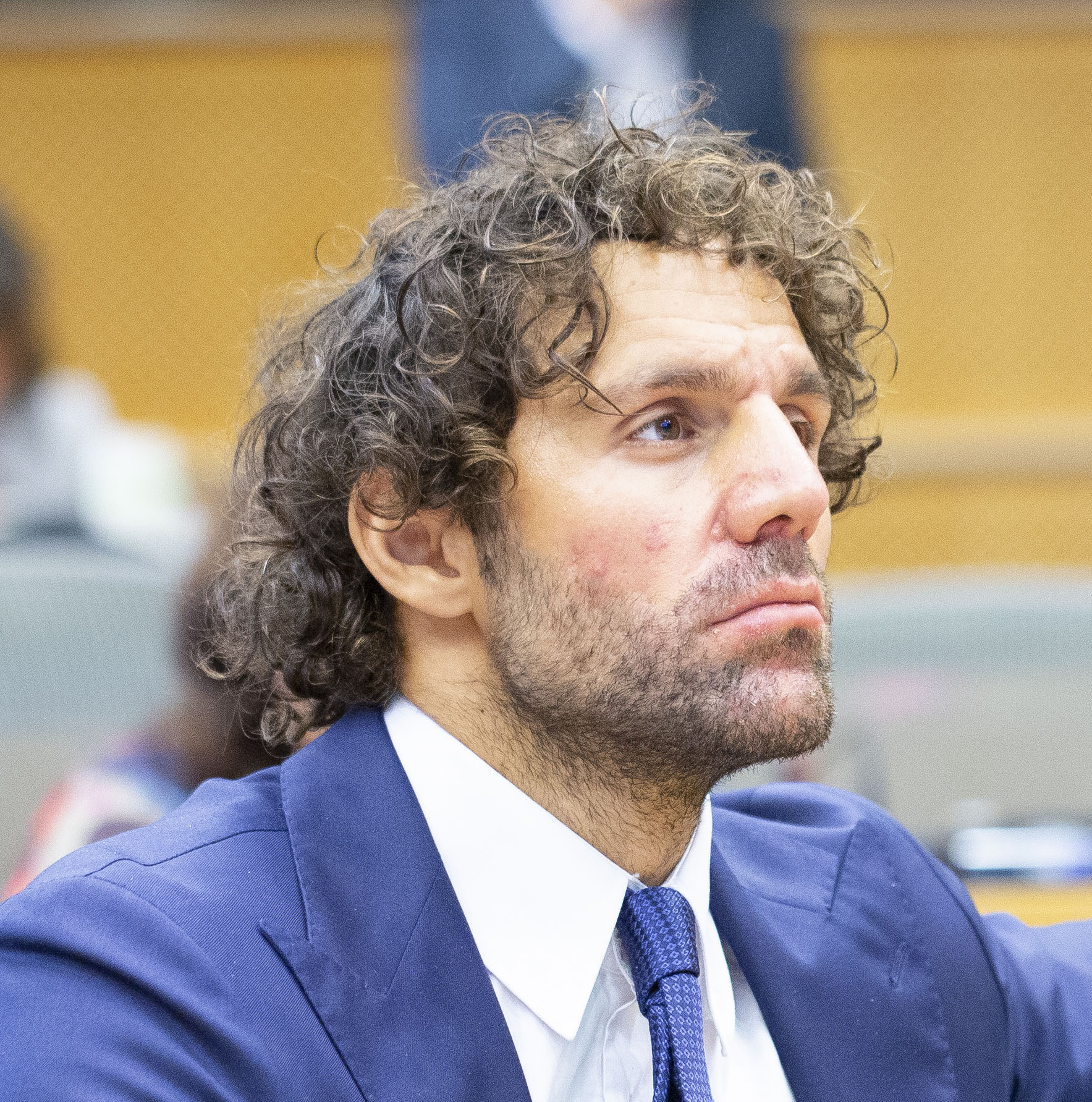

Personal information
- Native name: Αντώνιος Τσαπατάκης
- Nationality: Greek
- Born: Chania, Crete, Greece
- Occupation: Police officer
- Height: 1.88 m (6 ft 2 in)
- Weight: 76 kg (168 lb)

Sport
- Country: Greece
- Sport: Para swimming
- Disability: Paraplegia
- Disability class: SB4, S5
- Club: Megalonisos
- Coached by: Chrysafis Vangelakakis
Medal record
Paralympic Games
Silver medal – second place	2024 Paris	100 m breaststroke SB4
Bronze medal – third place	2020 Tokyo	100m breaststroke SB4
World Championships
Gold medal – first place	2022 Madeira	100m breaststroke SB4
Gold medal – first place	2023 Manchester	100m breaststroke SB4
Silver medal – second place	2015 Glasgow	100m breaststroke SB4
Bronze medal – third place	2013 Montreal	100m breaststroke SB4
Bronze medal – third place	2013 Montreal	200m individual medley SM5
Bronze medal – third place	2017 Mexico City	100m breaststroke SB4
Bronze medal – third place	2025 Singapore	100m breaststroke SB4
European Championships
Silver medal – second place	2014 Eindhoven	100m breaststroke SB4
Silver medal – second place	2014 Eindhoven	200m individual medley SM5
Bronze medal – third place	2009 Reykjavik	100m breaststroke SB4
Bronze medal – third place	2021 Funchal	100m breaststroke SB4

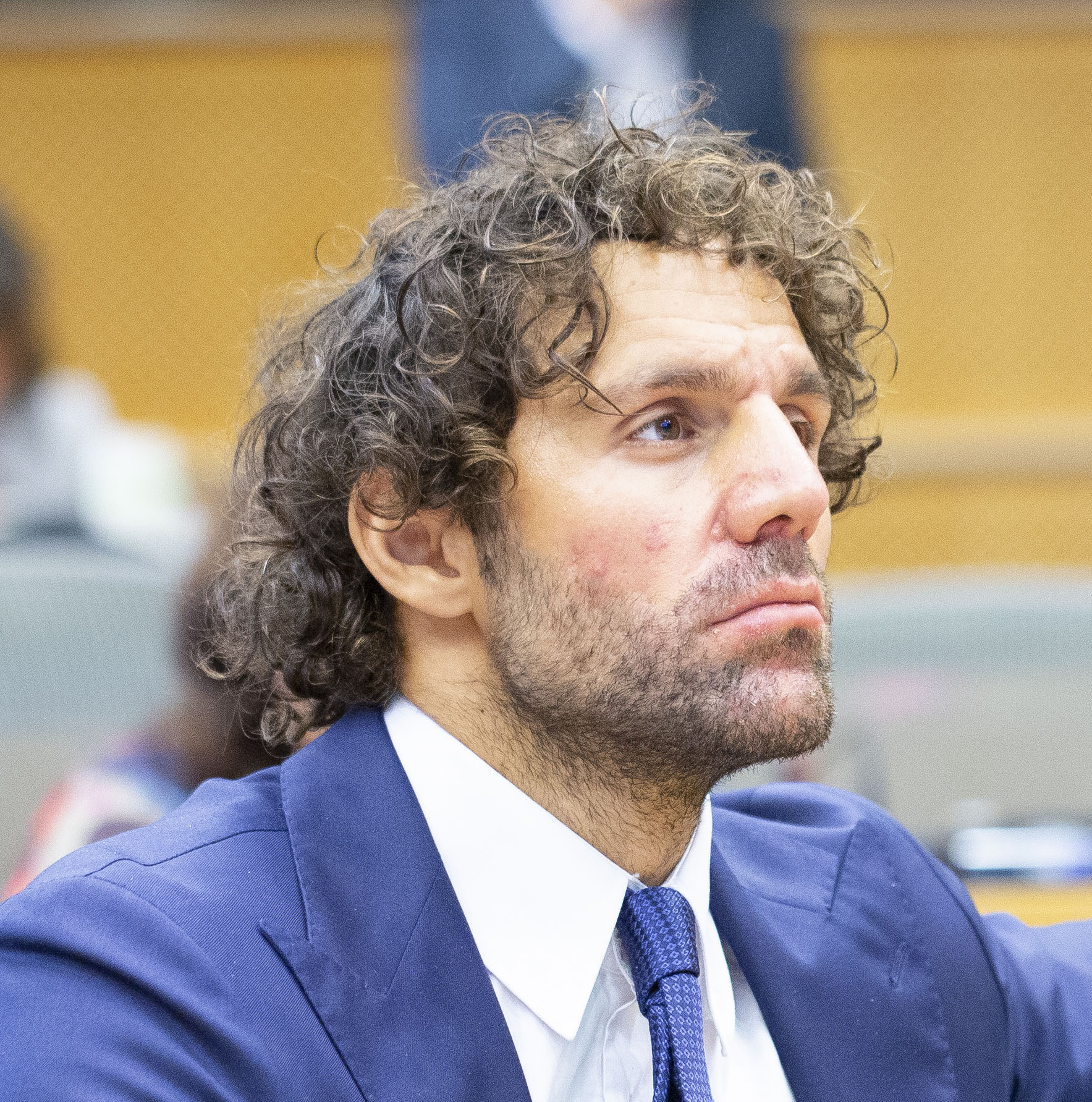
Tsapatakis in 2019

Antonios Tsapatakis (Greek: Αντώνιος Τσαπατάκης; born 13 January 1988) is a Greek para swimmer. He became a T8-9 complete paraplegic after a spinal cord injury due to a motorbike accident in 2006. He competes in 100m breaststroke SB4 classification.

Tsapatakis obtained many awards in national (holds two national records), European and global competitions. He possesses more than 20 gold, silver, and bronze medals. His power, passion and determination led him to the 2012 Paralympics in London, which added to his biographical material the 4th place in 100m breaststroke SB4. In 2015, he broke the European record and won the silver medal at the International Paralympic Committee (IPC) Swimming World Championship in Glasgow.

== Early life and education ==
Tsapatakis grew up in Chania, Crete. Αt the age of five, he started swimming in the public swimming pool of Chania. At the age of 12, he became a polo athlete of Chania swim club, earning awards in swimming and polo alike. In 2005, he enlisted in the academy of the Hellenic Police.

One year later, in December 2006, just outside the swimming pool where he had spent half of his life as a polo player, he lost the control of his motorcycle due to excessive speed. He was ejected against a pavement, resulting in paralysis of the lower limbs. Just under 9 months after becoming paralyzed Tsapatakis was back in the pool and in 2009 he started swimming in the disabled team of Megalonissos. Tsapatakis stated that what drove him back to swimming was his need of independence and becoming active again.

== Career ==
=== 2009 IPC European Championship ===
Tsapatakis's senior international debut was in 2009 with a bronze medal when he competed at the IPC Swimming European Championships in Iceland. He scored 2:01.33 during the final in 100 metre breaststroke.

=== 2013 IPC Swimming World Championships ===
In 2013, Tsapatakis attended the IPC Swimming World Championships, in Montreal. He qualified the third position, winning the bronze medal in 100m breaststroke SB4.

=== 2013 IPC Swimming World Championships ===
In the same competition, Tsapatakis obtained a second bronze medal, finishing in the third place (3:27.12), competed in Men's 200m Individual Medley SM5.

=== 2014 IPC European Championship ===
In August, 2014 Tsapatakis attended the IPC European Championship in Eindhoven, the Netherlands, scoring 1:39.23 in 100m breaststroke SB4 classification and winning the silver medal.

=== 2015 IPC Swimming World Championships ===
The men's 100 metre breaststroke at the 2015 IPC Swimming World Championships was held at the Tollcross International Swimming Centre in Glasgow, United Kingdom where Tsapatakis came with one more silver medal by broking the European record (1:36.75).

=== 2016 IPC European Championship ===
Tsapatakis set a new national record in 50m Butterfly Stroke at IPC Swimming European Championships in Funchal, Portugal. In the same competition, Antonios won the silver medal in men's 100 metre breastroke SB4, completing the race in 1:40.38.

=== 2017 IPC Swimming World Championships ===
At the 2017 IPC Swimming World Championships in Mexico City, Tsapatakis earned one more bronze medal with a score 1:45.12 in men’s 100m breaststroke SB4 final.

=== 2020 IPC European Championship ===
At the 2020 IPC European Championship in Madeira, Portugal, Tsapatakis scored 1:52.00 in 100m breaststroke SB4 classification, winning the bronze medal.

=== 2020 Summer Paralympics ===
At the 2020 Summer Paralympics, in Tokyo, Japan, Tsapatakis scored 1:40.20 in Men's 100m breaststroke SB4 classification, winning the bronze medal.

=== 2022 World Para Swimming Championships ===
At the 2022 World Para Swimming Championships in Madeira, Portugal, Tsapatakis became World Champion in Men's 100m breaststroke SB4 classification, completing the race in 1:36.27.

=== 2023 Para Swimming World Championships ===
At the 2023 Para Swimming World Championships in Manchester, UK, Tsapatakis won again the gold medal in Men's 100m breaststroke SB4 classification, completing the race in 1:39.53.

=== 2024 Summer Paralympics ===
At the 2024 Summer Paralympics, in Paris, France, Tsapatakis scored 1:36.16 in Men's 100m breaststroke SB4 classification, winning the silver medal.

== Other projects ==
In 2016, Antonios co-authored a children’s book with Elena Thoidou. The book entitled “To oneiro”, translating to “The dream”, was launched in June 2016 and one of the biggest dreams of Tsapatakis became reality. The aim of publishing this book was to familiarize children and their parents with the concept of equality while conveying meaningful messages regarding children with special needs. Tsapatakis is actively building upon his career outside of the pool through motivational speeches and other public appearances around the world. Through his position as a police officer in the Hellenic Police, Antonios visits Greek schools to share his experience regarding his accident, trying to motivate and educate children in matters of road safety and traffic rules.
