= 2022 World Para Swimming Championships – Men's 100 metre breaststroke =

The men's 100m breaststroke events at the 2022 World Para Swimming Championships were held at the Penteada Olympic Swimming Complex in Madeira between 12–18 June.

== Medalists ==
Event	Gold	Silver	Bronze
SB4	Antonios Tsapatakis; Greece	Moisés Fuentes; Colombia	Miguel Ángel Rincón; Colombia
SB5	Antoni Ponce Bertran; Spain	Leo McCrea; Switzerland	Pedro Rangel; Mexico
SB6	Nelson Crispín; Colombia	Morgan Ray; United States	Matthew Levy; Australia
SB7	Carlos Serrano Zárate; Colombia	Christian Sadie; South Africa	Mark Malyar; Israel
SB8	Vicente Enrique Almonacid Heyl; Chile	Oscar Salguero Galisteo; Spain	Andreas Onea; Austria
SB9	Stefano Raimondi; Italy	Maurice Wetekam; Germany	James Leroux; Canada
SB11	Rogier Dorsman; Netherlands	Keiichi Kimura; Japan	Edgaras Matakas; Lithuania
SB12	Vali Israfilov; Azerbaijan	Oleksii Fedyna; Ukraine	Andrey Afanasyev; Kazakhstan
SB13	Taliso Engel; Germany	Nurdaulet Zhumagali; Kazakhstan	Thomas van Wanrooij; Netherlands
SB14	Naohide Yamaguchi; Japan	Jake Michel; Australia	Joao Pedro Brutos de Oliveira; Brazil

== Results ==
=== SB4 ===
Final

Eight swimmers from seven nations took part.

Rank	Name	Nation	Result	Notes
1st place, gold medalist(s)	Antonios Tsapatakis	Greece	1:36.27	
2nd place, silver medalist(s)	Moisés Fuentes	Colombia	1:36.84	
3rd place, bronze medalist(s)	Miguel Ángel Rincón	Colombia	1:47.11	
4	Nicolas Rivero	Argentina	1:48.28	
5	Luis Huerta Poza	Spain	1:48.43	
6	Andrii Drapkin	Ukraine	1:56.06	
7	Zy Kher Lee	Malaysia	2:01.89	
8	Zeyad Kahil	Egypt	2:05.86	

=== SB12 ===
Final

Five swimmers from five nations took part.

Rank	Name	Nation	Result	Notes
1st place, gold medalist(s)	Vali Israfilov	Azerbaijan	1:05.66	
2nd place, silver medalist(s)	Oleksii Fedyna	Ukraine	1:07.92	
3rd place, bronze medalist(s)	Andrey Afanasyev	Kazakhstan	1:13.65	
4	Jin Guang Colin Soon	Singapore	1:14.08	
5	Eduardo Andres Munoz Castro	Chile		
