= Kyrylo Poida =

Ukrainian para swimmer

Personal information
- Nationality: Ukrainian

Sport
- Sport: Para swimming
- Disability class: S7
Medal record
Men's para swimming
Representing Ukraine
World Championships
Silver medal – second place	2025 Singapore	100 m breaststroke S6
European Championships
Gold medal – first place	2026 Kocaeli	100 m breaststroke SB7

Kyrylo Poida is a Ukrainian para swimmer who competes in the S7 classification.

== Career ==
Poida competed at the 2025 World Para Swimming Championships and won a bronze medal in the 100 metre breaststroke S7 event, finishing behind Carlos Serrano Zárate and Egor Efrosinin.
