= José Mafio =

Uruguayan swimmer

Personal information
- Full name: José Nicolas Mafio Plada
- National team: Uruguay
- Born: 29 September 1978 (age 47) Maldonado, Uruguay
- Height: 1.93 m (6 ft 4 in)
- Weight: 80 kg (176 lb)

Sport
- Sport: Swimming
- Strokes: Freestyle
- Coach: Daniel Garimaldi
Medal record
Representing Uruguay
South American Games
Bronze medal – third place	2006 Buenos Aires	4x100m freestyle relay

José Nicolas Mafio Plada (born September 29, 1978) is a Uruguayan former swimmer, who specialized in sprint freestyle events. Mafio qualified for the men's 50 m freestyle at the 2004 Summer Olympics in Athens, by clearing a FINA B-standard entry time of 23.52 from the Argentina Long Course Nationals in Mar del Plata. Mafio touched out Jamaica's Jevon Atkinson to hit the wall first in the fourth heat by three hundredths of a second (0.03) in 23.58. Mafio failed to advance into the semifinals, as he placed fiftieth out of 86 swimmers in the prelims.

After his Olympic appearance, Mafio remained active in the swimming community, training Chilean Paralympian Vicente Almonacid.
