= Swimming at the 2024 Summer Paralympics – Men's 100 metre breaststroke SB4 =

Men's 100 metre breaststroke SB4 at the XVII Paralympic Games
- Venue: La Défense Arena
- Dates: 2 September 2024
- Competitors: 10 from 10 nations
- Winning time: 1:32.20

Medalists
1st place, gold medalist(s)		Dmitrii Cherniaev	Neutral Paralympic Athletes
2nd place, silver medalist(s)		Antonios Tsapatakis	Greece
3rd place, bronze medalist(s)		Manuel Bortuzzo	Italy

The men's 100 metre breaststroke swimming (SB4) event at the 2024 Summer Paralympics took place on 2 September 2024, at the La Défense Arena in Paris.

== Records ==
Prior to the competition, the existing world and Paralympic records were as follows.

World Record	Dmitrii Cherniaev (RPC)	1:31.96	Tokyo, Japan	29 August 2021
Paralympic Record	Dmitrii Cherniaev (RPC)	1:31.96	Tokyo, Japan	29 August 2021

== Results ==
=== Heats ===
The heats were started at 11:04.

Rank	Heat	Lane	Name	Nationality	Time	Notes
1	2	4	Dmitrii Cherniaev	Neutral Paralympic Athletes	1:33.91	Q
2	1	4	Antonios Tsapatakis	Greece	1:37.00	Q
3	1	5	Manuel Bortuzzo	Italy	1:43.32	Q
4	2	5	Nicolás Rivero	Argentina	1:44.72	Q
5	1	3	Muhammad Nur Syaiful Zulkafli	Malaysia	1:45.15	Q
6	2	3	Miguel Ángel Rincón	Colombia	1:47.20	Q
7	2	2	Zeyad Kahil	Egypt	1:53.50	Q
8	2	6	Luis Huerta	Spain	1:56.17	Q
9	1	6	Oleksandr Komarov	Ukraine	2:05.07	
10	1	2	Marcos Jiménez	Dominican Republic	2:06.03	

=== Final ===
The final was held at 19:09.

Rank	Lane	Name	Nationality	Time	Notes
1st place, gold medalist(s)	4	Dmitrii Cherniaev	Neutral Paralympic Athletes	1:32.20	
2nd place, silver medalist(s)	5	Antonios Tsapatakis	Greece	1:36.16	
3rd place, bronze medalist(s)	3	Manuel Bortuzzo	Italy	1:42.52	
4	6	Nicolás Rivero	Argentina	1:44.77	
5	7	Miguel Ángel Rincón	Colombia	1:45.42	
6	2	Muhammad Nur Syaiful Zulkafli	Malaysia	1:46.71	
7	1	Zeyad Kahil	Egypt	1:53.21	
8	8	Luis Huerta	Spain	1:53.97	
