= Harry Stewart (swimmer) =

British Paralympic swimmer (born 2004)

Personal information
- Nationality: British
- Born: 11 May 2004 (age 22) Bridport, Dorset, England

Sport
- Sport: Para swimming
- Disability class: S14
Medal record
Men's paralympic swimming
Representing United Kingdom
World Championships
Gold medal – first place	2025 Singapore	Mixed 4×100 m medley relay S14
Bronze medal – third place	2025 Singapore	100 m breaststroke SB14
European Championships
Gold medal – first place	2024 Funchal	100 m breaststroke S14

Harry Stewart (born 11 May 2004) is an English Paralympic swimmer. Stewart competes in the S14 classification for swimmers with intellectual disabilities, mainly in breaststroke. He won a bronze medal at the 2025 World Para Swimming Championships and a gold medal at the 2024 World Para Swimming European Open Championships. He also represented Great Britain at the 2024 Summer Paralympics.

== Early life ==
Harry Stewart was born on 11 May 2004, in Bridport, Dorset, England. Stewart, who has Asperger syndrome, began swimming with clubs such as Bridport Barracudas, South Dorset Tornadoes and the West Dorset Swimming Club before moving to the Devon-based Plymouth Leander Swimming Club due to the lack of a 50 m pool in Dorset.

== Career ==
In April 2024, Stewart competed at the 2024 World Para Swimming European Open Championships, where he won the gold medal in the 100 metre breaststroke SB14 event. Several months later, he was selected to represent Great Britain at the 2024 Summer Paralympics, where he finished in fifth place in the 100 m backstroke S14 event.

In August 2025, Stewart was named to the British para swimming team for the 2025 World Para Swimming Championships held in Singapore. The following month, he won the bronze medal in the 100 m breaststroke. He was also part of the British team that won the mixed 4×100 m medley relay S14.
