= Vali Israfilov =

Azerbaijani swimmer (born 2002)

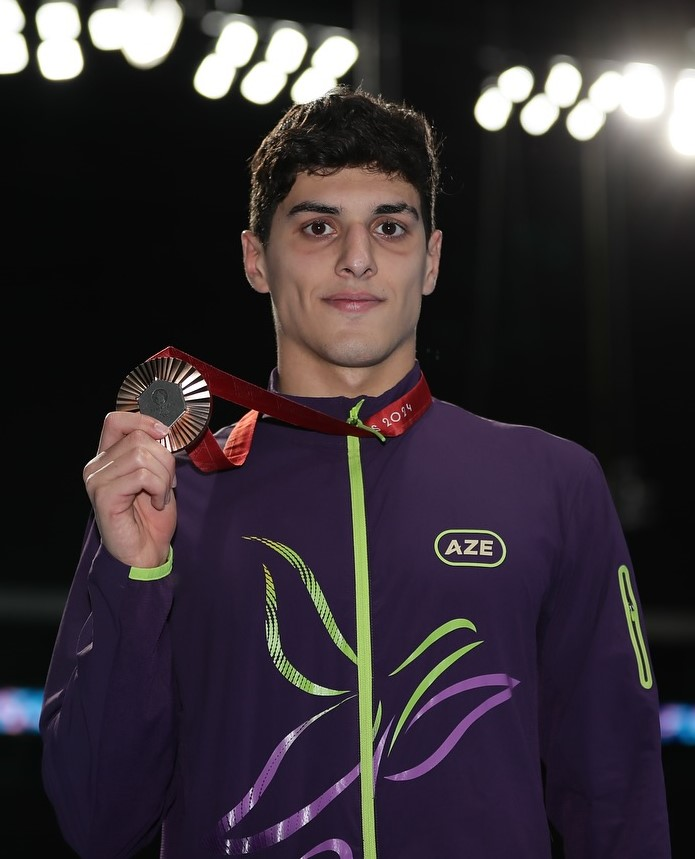
- Israfilov at the 2024 Summer Paralympics

Personal information
- Citizenship: Azerbaijan
- Born: 18 October 2002 (age 23) Tyumen, Russia

Sport
- Country: Azerbaijan
- Sport: Swimming
Medal record
Representing Azerbaijan
Paralympic Games
Gold medal – first place	2020 Tokyo	100 m breaststroke SB12
Bronze medal – third place	2024 Paris	100 m breaststroke SB13
World Championships
Gold medal – first place	2022 Madeira	100 m breaststroke SB12
Gold medal – first place	2023 Manchester	100 m breaststroke SB12
Bronze medal – third place	2019 London	100 m breaststroke SB12

Vali Israfilov (Azerbaijani: Vəli İsrafilov; born 18 October 2002) is an Azerbaijani paralympic-swimmer. At the 2020 Summer Paralympics he won a gold in the 100 metre breaststroke SB12 event.

== Personal life ==
He is studying at Azerbaijan State Oil and Industry University.
