= Artur Saifutdinov =

Russian Paralympic swimmer (born 1997)

Personal information
- Nationality: Russian
- Born: 11 January 1997 (age 29) Sterlitamak, Russia
- Height: 185 cm (6 ft 1 in)
- Weight: 80 kg (176 lb)

Sport
- Sport: Paralympic swimming
- Disability class: S12, SB12, SM112
- Club: Sterlitamak Youth Sports School No. 2
- Coached by: Alexander Zhivaev
Medal record
Paralympic swimming
Representing RPC
Paralympic Games
| Bronze medal – third place | 2020 Tokyo | 100 m breaststroke SB12 |
Representing Russia
European Championships
| Bronze medal – third place | 2016 Funchal | 100 m breaststroke SB12 |

Artur Saifutdinov (born 11 January 1997) is a Russian Paralympic swimmer who represented Russian Paralympic Committee athletes at the 2020 Summer Paralympics.

== Career ==
He represented Russian Paralympic Committee athletes at the 2020 Summer Paralympics in the men's 100 metre breaststroke SB12 event and won a bronze medal.
