= Danylo Semenykhin =

Ukrainian paralympic swimmer

Personal information
- Native name: Данило Семенихін
- Born: 9 July 2004 (age 21)

Sport
- Country: Ukraine
- Sport: Swimming
- Classifications: SB5
Medal record
Men's para-swimming
Representing Ukraine
Paralympic Games
Bronze medal – third place	2024 Paris	100 m breaststroke SB5
World Championships
Bronze medal – third place	2025 Singapore	100 m breaststroke SB5

Danylo Semenykhin (Ukrainian: Данило Семенихін; born 9 July 2004) is a Ukrainian paralympic swimmer. He competed at the 2024 Summer Paralympics, winning the bronze medal in the men's 100m breaststroke SB5 event.
