= Leo McCrea =

British-Swiss Paralympic swimmer

Personal information
- Nationality: British, Swiss
- Born: 9 November 2003 (age 22) England

Sport
- Country: Switzerland
- Sport: Paralympic swimming
- Disability: Achondroplasia
- Disability class: S5, S6
- Event(s): freestyle, individual medley, breaststroke
Medal record
Men's swimming
Representing Switzerland
Summer Paralympics
Gold medal – first place	2024 Paris	100 m breaststroke SB5
World Championships
Silver medal – second place	2022 Madeira	100 m breaststroke SB5
Silver medal – second place	2023 Manchester	100 m breaststroke SB5
European Championships
Bronze medal – third place	2024 Funchal	100 m breaststroke SB5

Leo McCrea (9 November 2003) is a British-Swiss Paralympic swimmer. He represented Switzerland at the 2024 Summer Paralympics, where he won a gold medal in the 100 metre breaststroke SB5 event.

== Early life and career ==
McCrea was born on 9 November 2003 with achondroplasia. He is from Poole, England; his father is from England and his mother, Corinne, is from Switzerland. He started swimming at the age of 6, inspired by his older sister, Jasmine. He started his competitive career at age 8, with Val Simmonds, Ellie Simmonds' mother, recommending that he join a club. He won multiple honours at the 2011 World Dwarf Games. McCrea is a Bournemouth University student.

=== 2019–2021: Tokyo Summer Paralympics ===
Since April 2019, McCrea has represented Switzerland in international competitions. He competed in the 2019 World Para Swimming Championships in London, where he participated in the 50 m freestyle S6, 100 m breaststroke SB6, 100 m freestyle S6, 100 m freestyle S6, 200 m individual medley SM6, and 400 m freestyle categories. He finished 8th in the final of the 400 m freestyle. McCrea competed in the 2020 World Para Swimming European Open Championships in Funchal, Portugal, where he entered the 50 m freestyle S6, 100 m breaststroke SB5, and 400 m freestyle S6 categories. He reached the finals in all of these events.

McCrea qualified for the 2020 Summer Paralympics in Tokyo, Japan. He participated in the 100 m freestyle S6, 100 m breaststroke SB5, 200 m individual medley SM6, and 400 m freestyle S6 events. He reached the final of the 100 m breaststroke SB5 event, where he placed 5th.

=== 2022–2024: Paris Summer Paralympics ===
He competed at the 2022 World Para Swimming Championships in Madeira, Portugal, in the 50 m freestyle S6, 100 m breaststroke SB5, and 100 m freestyle S6. He earned a silver medal in the 100 m breaststroke SB5 and reached the finals in the 100 m freestyle S6. At the 2023 World Para Swimming Championships in Manchester, England, McCrea participated in the 100 m breaststroke SB5, where he won a silver medal, and the 100 m freestyle S6 events.

At the 2024 World Para Swimming European Open Championships in Funchal, he won a bronze medal in the 100 m breaststroke SB5 event and he competed in the 200 m individual medley SM6 event. He qualified for the 2024 Summer Paralympics in Paris, France. He won a gold medal in the 100 m breaststroke SB5 event and he competed in the 200 m individual medley SM6 event.
