= Nurdaulet Zhumagali =

Kazakhstani Paralympic swimmer

Personal information
- Born: 28 January 1999 (age 27) Taraz, Kazakhstan

Sport
- Sport: Swimming
Medal record
Paralympic Games
Silver medal – second place	2024 Paris	100 m breaststroke SB13
Bronze medal – third place	2020 Tokyo	100 m breaststroke SB13
World Championships
Silver medal – second place	2022 Madeira	100m breaststroke SB13
Silver medal – second place	2023 Manchester	100m breaststroke SB13
Silver medal – second place	2025 Singapore	100m breaststroke SB13
Asian Para Games
Gold medal – first place	2022 Hangzhou	100 m breaststroke SB13

Nurdaulet Zhumagali (born 28 January 1999) is a Kazakhstani Paralympic swimmer. He is a bronze medalist at the 2020 Summer Paralympics held in Tokyo, Japan and a two-time silver medalist at the World Para Swimming Championships.

== Career ==
Zhumagali won the bronze medal in the men's 100 metre breaststroke SB13 event at the 2020 Summer Paralympics held in Tokyo, Japan.

He won the silver medal in the men's 100 metre breaststroke SB13 event at the 2022 World Para Swimming Championships held in Madeira. He also won the silver medal in this event at the 2023 World Para Swimming Championships held in Manchester, United Kingdom.
