= Vicente Almonacid =

Chilean Paralympic swimmer

Personal information
- Full name: Vicente Enrique Almonacid Heyl
- Born: 28 October 2000 (age 25)

Sport
- Country: Chile
- Sport: Paralympic swimming
- Disability: Fibromatosis
- Disability class: S8
- Coached by: José Mafio
Medal record
Paralympic swimming
Representing Chile
World Championships
Gold medal – first place	2022 Madeira	100m breaststroke SB8
Silver medal – second place	2023 Manchester	100m breaststroke SB8
Parapan American Games
Gold medal – first place	2019 Lima	100m breaststroke SB8
Gold medal – first place	2023 Santiago	200m ind. medley SM8
Silver medal – second place	2019 Lima	200m ind. medley SM8
Silver medal – second place	2023 Santiago	100m breaststroke SB8
Bronze medal – third place	2019 Lima	50m freestyle S8

Vicente Enrique Almonacid Heyl (born 28 October 2000) is a Chilean Paralympic swimmer who competes in international swimming competitions. Almonacid is a Parapan American Games and World champion in the breaststroke, and was the first Chilean swimmer to win a World title. He competed at the 2020 Summer Paralympics, where he finished in eighth place in his final.

== Personal life ==
Almonacid was born with an aggressive form of fibromatosis, a condition that causes developing tumours on the body. One of his fingers was surgically removed when he was five years old; he also had his left arm amputated and has had multiple operations since then. He began swimming as part of rehabilitation and was trained by Uruguayan former swimmer José Mafio, who participated at the 2004 Summer Olympics.

A month before the 2020 Summer Paralympics, Almonacid found a tumor on his mediastinum. He had the tumor removed despite the operation being complex and high risk due to the location where the tumor was discovered and his health condition.

In 2025, Almonacid was a candidate to deputy for the district 10 as a member of Democrats.
