= Maurice Wetekam =

German Paralympic swimmer (born 2006)

Personal information
- Born: 23 January 2006 (age 20) Dortmund, Germany

Sport
- Sport: Paralympic swimming
- Disability class: S9, SB9
Medal record
Men's paralympic swimming
Representing Germany
Paralympic Games
Bronze medal – third place	2024 Paris	100 m breaststroke SB9
World Championships
Silver medal – second place	2022 Madeira	100 m breaststroke SB9
Silver medal – second place	2023 Manchester	100 m breaststroke SB9

Maurice Wetekam (born 23 January 2006) is a German Paralympic swimmer. He represented Germany at the 2024 Summer Paralympics.

== Career ==
Wetekam represented Germany at the World Para Swimming Championships and won silver medals in the 100 metre breaststroke SB9 event in 2022 and 2023.

He represented Germany at the 2024 Summer Paralympics and won a bronze medal in the 100 metre breaststroke SB9 event, Germany's first medal of the 2024 Paralympics.
