= Naohide Yamaguchi =

Japanese para swimmer

Personal information
- Nationality: Japanese
- Born: 28 October 2000 (age 26) Imabari, Japan

Sport
- Sport: Para swimming
- Disability class: S14, SB14, SM14
- Club: MG Setouchi
- Coached by: Yumiko Taniguchi
Medal record
Para swimming
Representing Japan
Paralympic Games
Gold medal – first place	2020 Tokyo	100 m breaststroke SB14
Bronze medal – third place	2024 Paris	100 m breaststroke SB14
World Championships
Gold medal – first place	2019 London	100 m breaststroke SB14
Gold medal – first place	2022 Madeira	100 m breaststroke SB14
Gold medal – first place	2023 Manchester	100 m breaststroke SB14
Gold medal – first place	2025 Singapore	100 m breaststroke SB14
Asian Para Games
Gold medal – first place	2022 Hangzhou	100 m backstroke S14
Gold medal – first place	2026 Aichi–Nagoya	100 m breaststroke SB14

Naohide Yamaguchi (山口 尚秀, Yamaguchi Naohide; born 28 October 2000) is a Japanese para swimmer. He represented Japan at the 2020 and 2024 Summer Paralympics.

== Career ==
Yamaguchi represented Japan in the men's 100 metre breaststroke SB14 event at the 2020 Summer Paralympics and won a gold medal.
