= Morgan Ray =

American Paralympic swimmer (born 2002)

Personal information
- Born: August 2, 2002 (age 23) St. Augustine, Florida, U.S.
- Education: University of North Florida
- Height: 4 ft 5 in (135 cm)

Sport
- Sport: Paralympic swimming
- Disability: achondroplasia
- Disability class: S6, SB6, SM6
Medal record
Men's paralympic swimming
Representing United States
Paralympic Games
Silver medal – second place	2024 Paris	Mixed 4×50 m medley relay 20pts
World Championships
Silver medal – second place	2022 Madeira	100 m breaststroke SB6
Bronze medal – third place	2025 Singapore	Mixed 4×50 m medley relay 20pts

Morgan Ray (born August 2, 2002) is an American Paralympic swimmer. He represented the United States at the 2024 Summer Paralympics.

== Career ==
Ray represented the United States at the 2022 World Para Swimming Championships and won a silver medal in the 100 metre breaststroke SB6 event. He tested positive for COVID-19 during the World Championships.

Ray represented the United States at the 2024 Summer Paralympics and won a silver medal in the mixed 4 × 50 metre medley relay 20pts event.

== Personal life ==
Ray was born to Matt and Mary Ray, and has Mason, Michael and Maddox. He was born with achondroplasia.
