= Yang Hong (swimmer) =

Chinese Paralympic swimmer

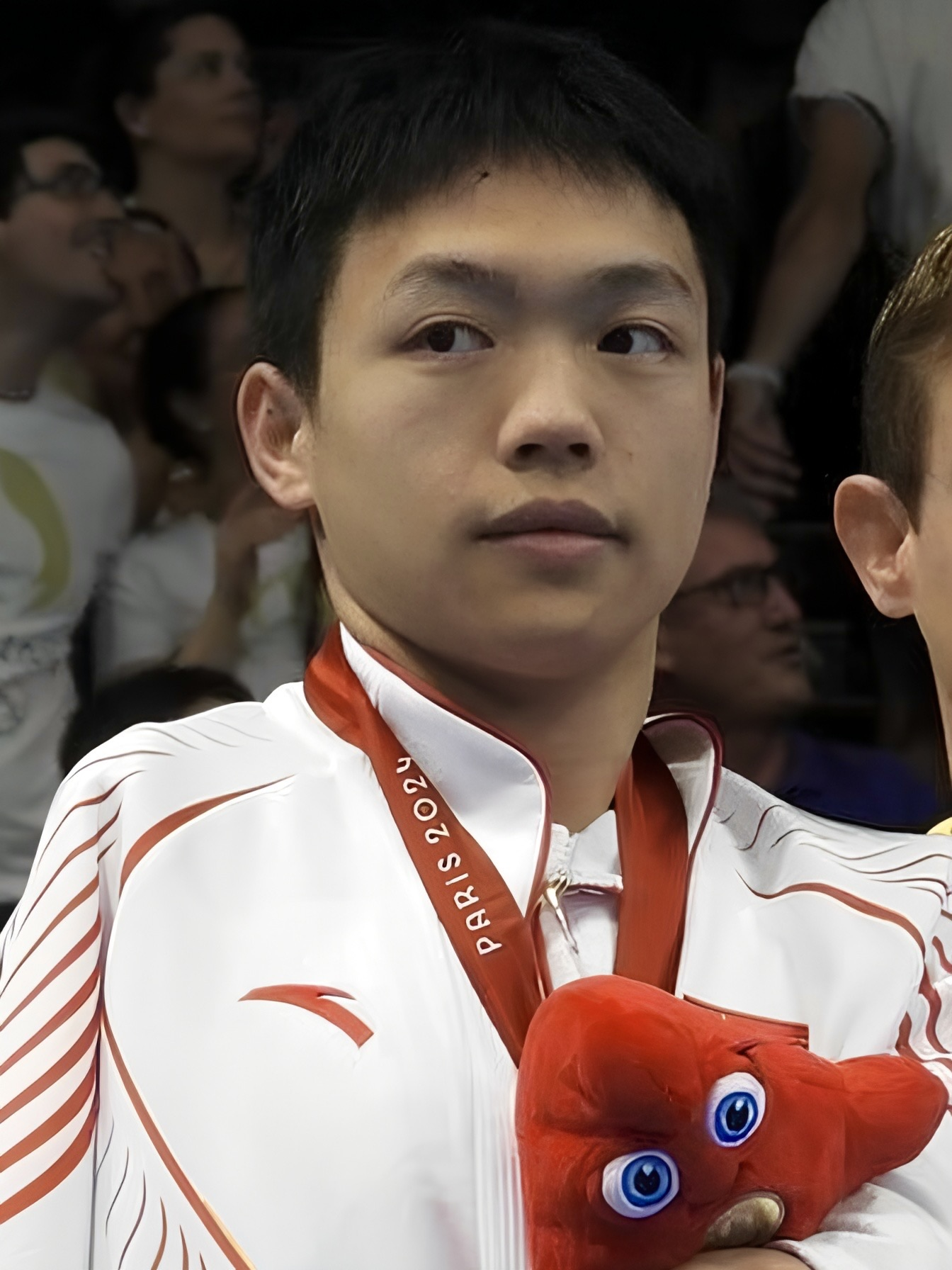
- Yang at the 2024 Summer Paralympics

Personal information
- Born: 21 March 2000 (age 26) Guizhou, China

Sport
- Sport: Paralympic swimming
- Disability class: S6, SB6, SM6
Medal record
Men's paralympic swimming
Representing China
Paralympic Games
Gold medal – first place	2024 Paris	100 m backstroke S6
Gold medal – first place	2024 Paris	100 m breaststroke SB6
Gold medal – first place	2024 Paris	200 m ind. medley SM6
Bronze medal – third place	2016 Rio de Janeiro	100 m breaststroke SB7
World Championships
Gold medal – first place	2023 Manchester	100 m backstroke S6
Gold medal – first place	2023 Manchester	100 m breaststroke SB6
Gold medal – first place	2025 Singapore	100 m backstroke S6
Gold medal – first place	2025 Singapore	200 m ind. medley SM6
Silver medal – second place	2017 Mexico City	100 m breaststroke SB7
Silver medal – second place	2019 London	100 m backstroke S6
Silver medal – second place	2025 Singapore	100 m breaststroke SB6
Bronze medal – third place	2019 London	100 m breaststroke SB6
Asian Para Games
Gold medal – first place	2018 Jakarta	100 m backstroke S6
Gold medal – first place	2018 Jakarta	100 m breaststroke SB6
Gold medal – first place	2018 Jakarta	200 m ind. medley SM6
Gold medal – first place	2022 Hangzhou	100 m backstroke S6
Gold medal – first place	2022 Hangzhou	100 m breaststroke SB6
Gold medal – first place	2022 Hangzhou	200 m ind. medley SM6
Silver medal – second place	2018 Jakarta	50 m freestyle S6
Silver medal – second place	2018 Jakarta	100 m freestyle S6
Silver medal – second place	2018 Jakarta	50 m butterfly S6
Bronze medal – third place	2022 Hangzhou	50 m butterfly S6

Yang Hong (born 21 March 2000) is a Chinese Paralympic swimmer. He represented China at the 2024 Summer Paralympics.

== Career ==
Yang represented China at the 2023 World Para Swimming Championships and won gold medals in the 100 metre breaststroke SB6 and 100 metre backstroke S6 events.

He represented China at the 2024 Summer Paralympics and won a gold medal in the 200 metre individual medley SM6 event.
