= Manuel Mateo Bortuzzo =

Italian Paralympic swimmer (born 1999)

Manuel Bortuzzo
Personal information
- Full name: Manuel Mateo Bortuzzo
- Born: 3 May 1999 (age 27) Trieste, Italy

Sport
- Country: Italy
- Sport: Swimming
- Classifications: SB4
Medal record
Men's para-swimming
Representing Italy
Paralympic Games
Bronze medal – third place	2024 Paris	100 m breaststroke SB4

Manuel Mateo Bortuzzo (born 3 May 1999) is an Italian Paralympic swimmer. He competed at the 2024 Summer Paralympics, winning a bronze medal in the men's 100 m breaststroke SB4.

== Career ==
In 2015 he won the Italian junior record in the 3,000 meters, taking that record away from Gregorio Paltrinieri. In February 2019, outside a pub in the southern suburbs of Rome, due to a mistaken identity he was the victim of a shooting, which caused a Spinal cord injury that left him semi-paralyzed.

He returned to the pool soon after his accident, but not yet feeling ready, he decided to take a break from swimming. At the end of the Tokyo Paralympic Games, he will resume his sports career. His Paralympic career officially began in November 2022, when he took part in his first Italian short-tub competition in Fabriano, winning a silver for SB4 category.

In May 2023, he qualified for the 2023 World Para Swimming Championships in August of the same year. He officially joins the Italian National Paralympic Swimming Team on May 26, 2023.

In April 2024, he participates in the 2023 World Para Swimming Championships. In late May 2024 he sets the Italian record in the 100-meter breaststroke at the Paralympic Swimming World Cup in Berlin. The following month he competes in the same specialty at the 60th Settecolli Trophy, taking first place.

He officially qualified for the 2024 Summer Paralympics in Paris in July 2024, and on September 2, 2024, he won the bronze medal in the 100-meter breaststroke SB4, also setting the Italian record.

On June 26, 2025, at the 61st Settecolli Trophy, he competed the 100 mt breaststroke, taking third place.
