= Thomas van Wanrooij =

Dutch Paralympic swimmer (born 2002)

Personal information
- Nationality: Dutch
- Born: 20 November 2002 (age 23) Rotterdam, Netherlands

Sport
- Sport: Para swimming
- Disability class: S13
- Club: Blue Marlins
- Coached by: Sander Nijhuis; Bram Dekker
Medal record
Men's para swimming
Representing the Netherlands
Paralympic Games
| Bronze medal – third place | 2020 Tokyo | 200 m medley SM13 |
World Championships
| Gold medal – first place | 2023 Manchester | 100 m backstroke S13 |
| Silver medal – second place | 2022 Madeira | 100 m backstroke S13 |
| Silver medal – second place | 2023 Manchester | 200 m medley SM13 |
| Silver medal – second place | 2025 Singapore | 100 m breaststroke Sb13 |
| Silver medal – second place | 2025 Singapore | 100 m backstroke S13 |
| Bronze medal – third place | 2022 Madeira | 100 m breaststroke SB13 |
| Bronze medal – third place | 2022 Madeira | 200 m medley SM13 |
European Championships
| Gold medal – first place | 2026 Kocaeli | 100 m backstroke S13 |
| Silver medal – second place | 2026 Kocaeli | 100 m breaststroke SB13 |

Thomas van Wanrooij (born 20 November 2002) is a Dutch para swimmer. He represented the Netherlands at the 2020 Summer Paralympics.

== Career ==
van Wanrooij represented the Netherlands at the 2020 Summer Paralympics in the 200 metre individual medley SM13 event and won a bronze medal.
