= Óscar Salguero =

Spanish Paralympic swimmer

Personal information
- Full name: Óscar Salguero Galisteo
- Nationality: Spain
- Born: 11 May 1998 (age 28) Sabadell, Catalonia, Spain

Sport
- Sport: Paralympic swimming
- Disability class: S9, SM9, SB8
Medal record
Men's para swimming
Representing Spain
Paralympic Games
Gold medal – first place	2016 Rio de Janeiro	100 m breaststroke SB8
Silver medal – second place	2020 Tokyo	100 m breaststroke SB8
Bronze medal – third place	2024 Paris	Mixed 4×100 m medley relay 34pts
World Championships
Gold medal – first place	2025 Singapore	Mixed 4×100 m medley relay 34pts
Silver medal – second place	2022 Madeira	100 m breaststroke SB8
Bronze medal – third place	2025 Singapore	100 m breaststroke SB8
European Championships
Bronze medal – third place	2026 Kocaeli	100 m breaststroke SB8

Óscar Salguero Galisteo (Note: In this Spanish name, the first or paternal surname is Salguero and the second or maternal family name is Galisteo.) (born 11 May 1998) is a Spanish Paralympic swimmer. He represented Spain at the 2020 Summer Paralympics.

== Career ==
Salguero Galisteo represented Spain in the men's 100 metre breaststroke SB8 event at the 2020 Summer Paralympics and won a silver medal.
