= Taliso Engel =

German Paralympic swimmer (born 2002)

Personal information
- Born: 4 June 2002 (age 24) Lauf an der Pegnitz, Germany
- Height: 1.81 m (5 ft 11 in)

Sport
- Country: Germany
- Sport: Paralympic swimming
- Disability class: S13, SB13, SM13
- Events: Breaststroke; Medley swimming
Medal record
Para swimming
Representing Germany
Paralympic Games
Gold medal – first place	2020 Tokyo	100 m breaststroke SB13
Gold medal – first place	2024 Paris	100 m breaststroke SB13
World Championships
Gold medal – first place	2019 London	100 m breaststroke SB13
Gold medal – first place	2022 Madeira	100 m breaststroke SB13
Gold medal – first place	2023 Manchester	100 m breaststroke SB13
Gold medal – first place	2025 Singapore	100 m breaststroke Sb13
European Championships
Gold medal – first place	2021 Funchal	100 m breaststroke SB13
Gold medal – first place	2026 Kocaeli	100 m breaststroke SB13
Bronze medal – third place	2018 Dublin	100 m breaststroke SB13

Taliso Engel (born 4 June 2002) is a blind German para swimmer who competes in international elite competitions.

== Career ==
He is a World champion and European champion in the breaststroke. He competed at the 2020 Summer Paralympics and won a gold medal in the 100 metre breaststroke SB13 event.

In September 2025, Engel won the men's 100 m breaststroke SB13 final at the World Para Swimming Championships in Singapore, setting a new world record of 1:01.69. The achievement came despite Engel managing both audio and visual impairments, which he discussed during the event.
