= David Abrahams (swimmer) =

American Paralympic swimmer (born 2001)

Personal information
- Full name: David Henry Abrahams
- Born: May 3, 2001 (age 25) Havertown, Pennsylvania, U.S.
- Height: 6 ft 3 in (191 cm)
- Weight: 185 lb (84 kg)

Sport
- Sport: Paralympic swimming
- Disability: Stargardt disease
- Disability class: S13, SB13, SM13
- Club: Radnor Aquatic Club
- Coached by: Jeremy Byrne
Medal record
Men's paralympic swimming
Representing United States
Paralympic Games
Silver medal – second place	2020 Tokyo	100 m breaststroke SB13
World Championships
Bronze medal – third place	2023 Manchester	100 m breaststroke SB13

David Henry Abrahams (born May 3, 2001) is a blind American Paralympic swimmer. He represented the United States at the 2020 Summer Paralympics.

== Early life and education ==
Abrahams attended Haverford High School in Havertown, Pennsylvania. He earned NISCA All American honors in 2018 and 2019. Abrahams attended Harvard University where he was a member of their swim team. He graduated in 2024 with a degree in mathematics.

== Career ==
Abrahams represented the United States in the 100 metre breaststroke SB13 event at the 2020 Summer Paralympics and won a silver medal.

On April 29, 2023, Abrahams was named to the roster to represent the United States at the 2023 World Para Swimming Championships. During the World Championship he won a bronze medal in the 100 metre breaststroke SB13 event.

In January 2024, Abrahams announced that the 2024 Summer Paralympics will be his final major international event. He will then start work full-time as a quantitative researcher with an investment management company.

== Personal life ==
Abrahams began losing his vision when he was 13 and was diagnosed with Stargardt disease.
