= 2025 World Para Swimming Championships – Men's 50 metre freestyle =

The men's 50 metre freestyle events at the 2025 World Para Swimming Championships were held at the Singapore Aquatic Centre between 21 and 27 September 2025. Racing took place over eleven classifications.

== Schedule ==
The 50 metre freestyle events for men were held across the following schedule:

Men's 50 metre freestyle
Day	Date	Classifications
Day 1	21 Sept	S5; S10; S11
Day 2	22 Sept	
Day 3	23 Sept	S12
Day 4	24 Sept	
Day 5	25 Sept	S3; S4; S6; S8; S13
Day 6	26 Sept	S7
Day 7	27 Sept	S9

== Medal summary ==
Event	Gold	Silver	Bronze
S3; Details	Josia Topf; Germany	Gabriele Lorenzo; Italy	Denys Ostapchenko; Ukraine
S4; Details	Ami Omer Dadaon; Israel	Cameron Leslie; New Zealand	Takayuki Suzuki; Japan
S5; Details	Guo Jincheng; China	Artem Oliinyk; Ukraine	Samuel de Oliveira; Brazil
S6; Details	Antonio Fantin; Italy	Vladyslav Koshman; Ukraine	Nelson Crispín; Colombia
S7; Details	Andrii Trusov; Ukraine	Carlos Serrano Zárate; Colombia	Egor Efrosinin; Individual Neutral Athletes
S8; Details	Eduard Horodianyn; Ukraine	Callum Simpson; Australia	Noah Jaffe; United States
S9; Details	Simone Barlaam; Italy	Oliwier Krzyszkowski; Poland	Fredrik Solberg; Norway
S10; Details	Rowan Crothers; Australia	Thomas Gallagher; Australia	Ihor Nimchenko; Ukraine
S11; Details	David Kratochvíl; Czech Republic	Mahamadou Dambelleh Jarra; Spain	Thomaz Rocha Matera; Brazil
S12; Details	Illia Yaremenko; Ukraine	Raman Salei; Azerbaijan	Maksym Veraksa; Ukraine
S13; Details	Oleksii Virchenko; Ukraine	Vitalii Tsybriuk; Individual Neutral Athletes	Egor Shchitkovskii; Individual Neutral Athletes

== Race summaries ==
=== S3 ===
The Men's 50 metre freestyle S3 event was held on 25 September.

The relevant records at the beginning of the event were as follows:

Record	Athlete	Time	Date	City	Country
World	Huang Wenpan (CHN)	0:38.81	2017-12-06	Mexico City	Mexico
Championship	Huang Wenpan (CHN)	0:38.81	2017-12-06	Mexico City	Mexico
African	Youssef Elsayed (EGY)	1:01.61	2021-06-19	Berlin	Germany
Americas	Diego Lopez Diaz (MEX)	0:39.70	2017-12-06	Mexico City	Mexico
Asian	Huang Wenpan (CHN)	0:38.81	2017-12-06	Mexico City	Mexico
European	Dmytro Vynohradets (UKR)	0:41.41	2016-09-13	Rio de Janeiro	Brazil
Oceania	Ahmed Kelly (AUS)	0:51.89	2023-08-04	Manchester	United Kingdom

==== Heats ====
Seventeen swimmers took part, with the top eight progressing to the final.

Rank	Heat	Lane	Athlete	Class	Time	Notes
1	1	4	Gabriele Lorenzo (ITA)	S3	45.17	Q
2	1	3	Serhii Palamarchuk (UKR)	S3	46.73	Q
3	2	5	Josia Topf (GER)	S3	47.24	Q
4	2	3	Denys Ostapchenko (UKR)	S3	47.81	Q
5	1	6	Diego Lopez Diaz (MEX)	S3	48.30	Q
6	2	6	Daniel Ferrer Robles (ESP)	S3	48.36	Q
7	2	4	Igor Bobyrev (AIN)	S3	49.13	Q
8	1	5	Umut Unlu (TUR)	S3	49.72	Q
9	1	2	Krzysztof Lechniak (POL)	S3	50.90	
10	2	2	Isaias Sono (PER)	S3	51.14	
11	1	1	Marco Tinamisan (PHI)	S3	52.18	
12	2	7	Marcos Rafael Zarate Rodriguez (MEX)	S3	52.55	
13	2	1	Ahmed Kelly (AUS)	S3	52.96	
14	2	0	Methasit Nakananram (THA)	S3	53.34	
15	1	7	Gabriel Araújo (BRA)	S2	53.40	
16	1	8	Patricio Larenas Albayay (CHI)	S3	58.64	
17	2	8	Charkorn Kaewsri (THA)	S3	1:00.23	

==== Final ====
Rank	Lane	Athlete	Class	Time	Notes
1st place, gold medalist(s)	3	Josia Topf (GER)	S3	42.85	
2nd place, silver medalist(s)	4	Gabriele Lorenzo (ITA)	S3	43.49	
3rd place, bronze medalist(s)	6	Denys Ostapchenko (UKR)	S3	46.27	
4	1	Igor Bobyrev (AIN)	S3	46.29	
5	5	Serhii Palamarchuk (UKR)	S3	46.65	
6	7	Daniel Ferrer Robles (ESP)	S3	47.54	
7	8	Umut Unlu (TUR)	S3	48.36	
8	2	Diego Lopez Diaz (MEX)	S3	48.59	

=== S4 ===
The Men's 50 metre freestyle S4 event will be held on 25 September. The relevant records at the beginning of the event were as follows:

Record	Athlete	Time	Date	City	Country
World	Sebastian Massabie (CAN)	0:35.61	2024-09-06	Paris	France
Championship	Ami Omer Dadaon (ISR)	0:36.25	2022-06-16	Funchal	Portugal
Americas	Sebastian Massabie (CAN)	0:35.61	2024-09-06	Paris	France
Asian	Takayuki Suzuki (JPN)	0:36.85	2024-09-06	Paris	France
European	Ami Omer Dadaon (ISR)	0:36.25	2022-06-16	Funchal	Portugal
Oceania	Cameron Leslie (NZL)	0:36.71	2022-06-16	Funchal	Portugal

==== Heats ====
Fourteen swimmers took part, with the top eight progressing to the final.

Rank	Heat	Lane	Athlete	Class	Time	Notes
1	2	4	Takayuki Suzuki (JPN)	S4	37.85	Q
2	1	4	Ami Omer Dadaon (ISR)	S4	38.52	Q
3	1	5	Ángel Camacho (MEX)	S4	38.80	Q
4	2	5	Cameron Leslie (NZL)	S4	39.06	Q
5	2	6	Federico Cristiani (ITA)	S4	39.26	Q
6	2	3	Luigi Beggiato (ITA)	S4	39.84	Q
7	2	2	Andreas Ernhofer (AUT)	S4	42.13	Q
8	1	3	Ariel Malyar (ISR)	S4	42.68	Q
9	1	2	Dimitri Granjux (FRA)	S4	42.84	
10	1	6	Roman Zhdanov (AIN)	S4	44.12	
11	2	7	Arnost Petracek (CZE)	S4	44.94	
12	1	7	Matz Topkin (EST)	S4	45.48	
13	2	1	Dmytro Vynohradets (UKR)	S4	47.51	
	1		Abdarhaman Sheniba (LBA)	S4		DNS

==== Final ====
Rank	Lane	Athlete	Class	Time	Notes
1st place, gold medalist(s)	5	Ami Omer Dadaon (ISR)	S4	37.43	
2nd place, silver medalist(s)	6	Cameron Leslie (NZL)	S4	37.44	
3rd place, bronze medalist(s)	4	Takayuki Suzuki (JPN)	S4	37.73	
4	3	Ángel Camacho (MEX)	S4	37.74	
5	2	Federico Cristiani (ITA)	S4	39.21	
6	7	Luigi Beggiato (ITA)	S4	40.63	
7	1	Andreas Ernhofer (AUT)	S4	40.91	
8	8	Ariel Malyar (ISR)	S4	43.46	

=== S5 ===
The Men's 50 metre freestyle S5 event was held on 21 September. The relevant records at the beginning of the event were as follows:

Record	Athlete	Time	Date	City	Country
World	Guo Jincheng (CHN)	0:29.33	2024-09-05	Paris	France
Championship	Guo Jincheng (CHN)	0:29.78	2023-07-31	Manchester	United Kingdom
African	Ahmad Mohamed Hashad (EGY)	0:41.43	2023-11-11	Cairo	Egypt
Americas	Samuel de Oliveira (BRA)	0:31.40	2023-11-18	Santiago	Chile
Asian	Guo Jincheng (CHN)	0:29.33	2024-09-05	Paris	France
European	Antonio Fantin (ITA)	0:30.16	2019-06-01	Lignano Sabbiadoro	Italy
Oceania	Cameron Leslie (NZL)	0:37.47	2010-08-15	Eindhoven	Netherlands

==== Heats ====
Fourteen swimmers took part in heats, with the top eight progressing to the final.

Rank	Heat	Lane	Athlete	Time	Note
1	2	4	Jincheng Guo (CHN)	30.96	Q
2	1	6	Artem Oliinyk (UKR)	31.82	Q
3	1	5	Samuel de Oliveira (BRA)	32.24	Q
4	2	5	Oleksandr Komarov (UKR)	32.74	Q
5	2	6	Yaroslav Semenenko (UKR)	33.61	Q
6	1	4	Yuan Weiyi (CHN)	33.62	Q
7	2	3	Kirill Pulver (AIN)	33.63	Q
8	2	2	Koral Berkin Kutlu (TUR)	33.95	Q
9	1	7	Tiago de Oliveira (BRA)	34.24	R
10	1	3	Francesco Bocciardo (ITA)	34.66	R
11	1	2	Kaede Hinata (JPN)	36.01	
12	2	1	Luis Huerta Poza (ESP)	36.23	
13	2	7	Sebastian Massabie (CAN)	36.33	

==== Final ====
Rank	Lane	Athlete	Time	Note
1st place, gold medalist(s)	4	Jincheng Guo (CHN)	30.11	
2nd place, silver medalist(s)	5	Artem Oliinyk (UKR)	31.42	
3rd place, bronze medalist(s)	3	Samuel de Oliveira (BRA)	31.67	
4	7	Yuan Weiyi (CHN)	31.79	
5	6	Oleksandr Komarov (UKR)	31.99	
6	8	Koral Berkin Kutlu (TUR)	33.27	
6	2	Yaroslav Semenenko (UKR)	33.27	
8	1	Kirill Pulver (AIN)	33.52	

=== S6 ===
The Men's 50 metre freestyle S6 event was held on 25 September. The relevant records at the beginning of the event were as follows:

Record	Athlete	Time	Date	City	Country
World	Xu Qing (CHN)	0:28.57	2012-09-04	London	United Kingdom
Championship	Antonio Fantin (ITA)	0:28.59	2023-08-04	Manchester	United Kingdom
African	Kabelo Zwane (RSA)	0:35.84	2019-04-28	Glasgow	United Kingdom
Americas	Nelson Crispín (COL)	0:29.14	2015-08-10	Toronto	Canada
Asian	Xu Qing (CHN)	0:28.57	2012-09-04	London	United Kingdom
European	Antonio Fantin (ITA)	0:28.59	2023-08-04	Manchester	United Kingdom
Oceania	Matthew Haanappel (AUS)	0:30.77	2016-09-10	Rio de Janeiro	Brazil

==== Heats ====
Twelve swimmers took part, with the top eight progressing to the final.

Rank	Heat	Lane	Athlete	Class	Time	Notes
1	2	4	Antonio Fantin (ITA)	S6	29.42	Q
2	1	4	Nelson Crispín (COL)	S6	29.72	Q
3	2	5	Santiago León (COL)	S6	29.87	Q
4	1	5	Vladyslav Koshman (UKR)	S6	29.93	Q
5	2	6	David Rendón (COL)	S6	30.92	Q
6	1	3	Mikhail Evseenko (AIN)	S6	31.48	Q
7	2	3	Laurent Chardard (FRA)	S6	31.69	Q
8	2	2	Yerzhan Salimgereyev (KAZ)	S6	32.14	Q
9	1	6	Raul Gutierrez (MEX)	S6	32.37	
10	1	7	Gary Bejino (PHI)	S6	32.80	
11	1	2	Gabriel Meloni (BRA)	S6	33.11	
12	2	7	Andrii Drapkin (UKR)	S6	37.68	

==== Final ====
Rank	Lane	Athlete	Class	Time	Notes
1st place, gold medalist(s)	4	Antonio Fantin (ITA)	S6	29.23	
2nd place, silver medalist(s)	6	Vladyslav Koshman (UKR)	S6	29.60	
3rd place, bronze medalist(s)	5	Nelson Crispín (COL)	S6	29.61	
4	3	Santiago León (COL)	S6	29.95	
5	2	David Rendón (COL)	S6	30.77	
6	1	Laurent Chardard (FRA)	S6	30.86	
7	7	Mikhail Evseenko (AIN)	S6	31.16	
8	8	Yerzhan Salimgereyev (KAZ)	S6	32.32	

=== S7 ===
The Men's 50 metre freestyle S7 event was held on 26 September. The relevant records at the beginning of the event were as follows:

Record	Athlete	Time	Date	City	Country
World	Andrii Trusov (UKR)	0:26.38	2024-09-04	Paris	France
Championship	Andrii Trusov (UKR)	0:27.07	2019-09-15	London	United Kingdom
African	Christian Sadie (RSA)	0:28.75	2024-09-04	Paris	France
Americas	Carlos Serrano Zárate (COL)	0:27.23	2024-06-01	Berlin	Germany
Asian	Pan Shiyun (CHN)	0:27.35	2016-09-09	Rio de Janeiro	Brazil
European	Andrii Trusov (UKR)	0:26.38	2024-09-04	Paris	France
Oceania	Matt Levy (AUS)	0:28.17	2014-08-07	Pasadena	United States

==== Heats ====
Twelve swimmers took part, with the top eight progressing to the final.

Rank	Heat	Lane	Athlete	Time	Note
1	2	4	Andrii Trusov (UKR)	27.98	Q
2	2	5	Egor Efrosinin (AIN)	28.84	Q
3	1	4	Carlos Serrano Zárate (COL)	28.86	Q
4	1	5	Federico Bicelli (ITA)	29.10	Q
5	2	3	Christian Sadie (RSA)	29.30	Q
6	2	6	Wei Soong Toh (SGP)	29.97	Q
7	1	3	Jurijs Semjonovs (LAT)	30.51	Q
8	1	6	Sardor Bakhtiyorov (UZB)	30.66	Q
9	1	2	Yaroslav Karpenko (UKR)	31.26	R
10	2	2	Adin Williams (USA)	33.14	R
11	2	7	Karlo Knezevic (CRO)	33.37	R

==== Final ====
Rank	Lane	Athlete	Time	Note
1st place, gold medalist(s)	4	Andrii Trusov (UKR)	26.72	CR
2nd place, silver medalist(s)	3	Carlos Serrano Zárate (COL)	28.04	
3rd place, bronze medalist(s)	5	Egor Efrosinin (AIN)	28.38	
4	6	Federico Bicelli (ITA)	28.45	
5	2	Christian Sadie (RSA)	28.70	AFR
6	7	Toh Wei Soong (SGP)	29.57	
7	1	Jurijs Semjonovs (LAT)	30.20	
8	8	Sardor Bakhtiyorov (UZB)	30.22	

=== S8 ===
The men's 50 metre freestyle S8 event was held on 25 September. The relevant records at the beginning of the event were as follows:

Record	Athlete	Time	Date	City	Country
World	Denis Tarasov (RUS)	0:25.32	2014-08-10	Eindhoven	Netherlands
Championship	Denis Tarasov (RUS)	0:25.34	2015-07-19	Glasgow	United Kingdom
African	Cristiaan Du Plessis (RSA)	0:29.64	2010-08-18	Eindhoven	Netherlands
Americas	Gabriel de Souza (BRA)	0:26.58	2024-05-03	São Paulo	Brazil
Asian	Wang Yinan (CHN)	0:26.17	2014-10-23	Incheon	South Korea
European	Denis Tarasov (RUS)	0:25.32	2014-08-10	Eindhoven	Netherlands
Oceania	Peter Leek (AUS)	0:26.75	2010-08-18	Eindhoven	Netherlands

==== Heats ====
Fifteen swimmers took part, with the top eight progressing to the final.

Rank	Heat	Lane	Athlete	Class	Time	Notes
1	2	5	Callum Simpson (AUS)	S8	26.54	Q, OC
2	1	4	Eduard Horodianyn (UKR)	S8	26.72	Q
3	1	5	Abd Halim Mohammad (MAS)	S8	27.16	Q
4	2	3	Dimosthenis Michalentzakis (GRE)	S8	27.46	Q
5	2	4	Gabriel de Souza (BRA)	S8	27.49	Q
6	1	3	Noah Jaffe (USA)	S8	27.73	Q
7	2	6	Turgut Aslan Yaraman (TUR)	S8	27.80	Q
8	1	6	Alberto Amodeo (ITA)	S8	28.11	Q
9	2	2	Reid Maxwell (CAN)	S8	28.12	
10	2	8	Azizbek Boynazarov (UZB)	S8	28.26	
11	1	7	Kota Kubota (JPN)	S8	28.30	
12	2	7	Sergio Martos Minguet (ESP)	S8	28.53	
13	1	2	Michal Golus (POL)	S8	28.73	
14	2	1	Bohdan Hrynenko (UKR)	S8	29.62	

==== Final ====
Rank	Lane	Athlete	Class	Time	Notes
1st place, gold medalist(s)	5	Eduard Horodianyn (UKR)	S8	26.18	
2nd place, silver medalist(s)	4	Callum Simpson (AUS)	S8	26.21	OC
3rd place, bronze medalist(s)	7	Noah Jaffe (USA)	S8	27.16	
4	6	Dimosthenis Michalentzakis (GRE)	S8	27.24	
4	1	Turgut Aslan Yaraman (TUR)	S8	27.24	
6	3	Abd Halim Mohammad (MAS)	S8	27.29	
7	8	Alberto Amodeo (ITA)	S8	27.95	
	2	Gabriel de Souza (BRA)	S8		DSQ

=== S9 ===
The men's 50 metre freestyle S9 event was held on 27 September. The relevant records at the beginning of the event were as follows:

Record	Athlete	Time	Date	City	Country
World	Simone Barlaam (ITA)	0:23.90	2024-09-02	Paris	France
Championship	Simone Barlaam (ITA)	0:23.96	2023-08-06	Manchester	United Kingdom
African	Hady Abdalla (EGY)	0:29.25	2023-11-11	Cairo	Egypt
Americas	Jamal Hill (USA)	0:25.19	2021-08-29	Tokyo	Japan
Asian	Xie Zhili (CHN)	0:25.48	2024-09-02	Paris	France
European	Simone Barlaam (ITA)	0:23.90	2024-09-02	Paris	France
Oceania	Matthew Cowdrey (AUS)	0:25.13	2012-09-05	London	United Kingdom

==== Heats ====
Fifteen swimmers took part, with the top eight progressing to the final.

Rank	Heat	Lane	Athlete	Time	Note
1	2	4	Simone Barlaam (ITA)	24.47	Q
2	2	6	Oliwier Krzyszkowski (POL)	25.31	Q
3	2	2	Zarif Pouresmaeily (IRI)	25.70	Q
4	2	5	Fredrik Solberg (NOR)	25.74	Q
5	1	4	Denis Tarasov (AIN)	25.85	Q
6	1	5	Xie Zhili (CHN)	25.91	Q
7	1	6	Tommaso Wulzer (ITA)	26.08	Q
8	2	7	Simone Ciulli (ITA)	26.27	Q
9	2	3	Dmytro Vasylenko (UKR)	26.34	R
10	1	1	Malte Braunschweig (GER)	26.45	R
11	1	7	Hector Denayer (FRA)	26.56	R
12	1	3	Bogdan Mozgovoi (AIN)	26.84	
13	2	1	Jose Antonio Mari Alcaraz (ESP)	26.86	
14	1	2	Yurii Bozhynskyi (UKR)	27.69	
15	2	8	Mustafa Al-Hayani (IRQ)	27.96	

==== Final ====
Rank	Lane	Athlete	Time	Note
1st place, gold medalist(s)	4	Simone Barlaam (ITA)	24.20	
2nd place, silver medalist(s)	5	Oliwier Krzyszkowski (POL)	24.87	
3rd place, bronze medalist(s)	6	Fredrik Solberg (NOR)	25.53	
4	2	Denis Tarasov (AIN)	25.57	
5	7	Xie Zhili (CHN)	25.58	
6	1	Tommaso Wulzer (ITA)	25.76	
7	3	Zarif Pouresmaeily (IRI)	25.93	
8	8	Simone Ciulli (ITA)	26.13	

=== S10 ===
The men's 50 metre freestyle S10 event was held on 21 September. The relevant records at the beginning of the event were as follows:

Record	Athlete	Time	Date	City	Country
World	André Brasil (BRA)	0:23.16	2012-08-31	London	United Kingdom
Championship	André Brasil (BRA)	0:23.20	2015-07-13	Glasgow	United Kingdom
African	Zeiad Tarek Hasby (EGY)	0:24.75	2024-08-29	Paris	France
Americas	André Brasil (BRA)	0:23.16	2012-08-31	London	United Kingdom
Asian	Lin Furong (CHN)	0:24.86	2012-08-31	London	United Kingdom
European	Maksym Krypak (UKR)	0:23.33	2016-09-09	Rio de Janeiro	Brazil
Oceania	Rowan Crothers (AUS)	0:23.21	2021-08-25	Tokyo	Japan

==== Heats ====
Thirteen swimmers took part with one late withdrawal, with the top eight progressing to the final.

Rank	Heat	Lane	Athlete	Time	Note
1	2	4	Thomas Gallagher (AUS)	23.43	Q
2	1	4	Rowan Crothers (AUS)	23.49	Q
3	1	5	Ihor Nimchenko (UKR)	23.92	Q
4	2	5	Stefano Raimondi (ITA)	24.49	Q
5	2	3	Alexander Tuckfield (AUS)	24.56	Q
6	1	6	Zeiad Tarek Hasby (EGY)	24.83	Q
7	1	3	Fernando Lu (CAN)	24.88	Q
8	2	2	Koehn Boyd (USA)	24.90	Q
9	2	6	Dmitrii Grigorev (AIN)	25.06	R
10	1	2	Jack Gill (CAN)	25.25	R
11	1	7	Emil Salemgareev (AIN)	25.76	
12	2	7	Sina Zeyghaminejad (IRI)	25.82	
-	2	1	Turki Alharbi (KSA)	DNS	

==== Final ====
Rank	Lane	Athlete	Time	Notes
1st place, gold medalist(s)	4	Rowan Crothers (AUS)	23.21	=OCR
2nd place, silver medalist(s)	3	Thomas Gallagher (AUS)	23.46	
3rd place, bronze medalist(s)	1	Ihor Nimchenko (UKR)	23.58	
4	5	Stefano Raimondi (ITA)	24.20	
5	2	Alexander Tuckfield (AUS)	24.40	
6	6	Koehn Boyd (USA)	24.81	
6	8	Fernando Lu (CAN)	24.90	
8	7	Zeiad Tarek Hasby (EGY)	25.05	

=== S11 ===
The men's 50 metre freestyle S11 event was held on 21 September. The relevant records at the beginning of the event were as follows:

Record	Athlete	Time	Date	City	Country
World	Yang Bozun (CHN)	0:25.27	2012-09-01	London	United Kingdom
Championship	Bradley Snyder (USA)	0:25.78	2015-07-17	Glasgow	United Kingdom
African	Hendri Herbst (RSA)	0:26.92	2016-04-23	Rio de Janeiro	Brazil
Americas	Bradley Snyder (USA)	0:25.57	2016-09-12	Rio de Janeiro	Brazil
Asian	Yang Bozun (CHN)	0:25.27	2012-09-01	London	United Kingdom
European	David Kratochvíl (CZE)	0:25.66	2025-07-27	Istanbul	Turkey
Oceania	Jeremy McClure (AUS)	0:31.01	2020-02-15	Melbourne	Australia

==== Heats ====
Fourteen swimmers took part, with the top eight progressing to the final.

Rank	Heat	Lane	Athlete	Time	Note
1	2	4	David Kratochvíl (CZE)	25.45	Q CR
2	1	5	Rogier Dorsman (NED)	26.10	Q
3	2	3	Mahamadou Dambelleh Jarra (ESP)	26.16	Q
4	1	3	Edgaras Matakas (LTU)	26.34	Q
5	2	5	Keiichi Kimura (JPN)	26.38	Q
6	1	4	Hua Dongdong (CHN)	26.83	Q
7	2	6	Thomaz Rocha Matera (BRA)	26.93	Q
8	1	2	Zhixin Li (CHN)	26.98	Q
9	2	2	Marco Meneses (POR)	27.15	R
10	1	6	Matheus Correa (BRA)	27.38	R
11	2	7	Mykhailo Serbin (UKR)	27.49	
12	1	7	José Cantero (ESP)	27.58	
13	2	1	Simonas Zvirblis (LTU)	28.57	
14	1	1	Eugeniu Nicolenco (MDA)	35.24	

==== Final ====
Rank	Lane	Athlete	Time	Note
1st place, gold medalist(s)	4	David Kratochvil (CZE)	25.52	
2nd place, silver medalist(s)	3	Mahamadou Dambelleh Jarra (ESP)	25.88	
3rd place, bronze medalist(s)	1	Thomaz Rocha Matera (BRA)	26.17	
4	5	Rogier Dorsman (NED)	26.21	
5	2	Keiichi Kimura (JPN)	26.22	
6	6	Edgaras Matakas (LTU)	26.44	
6	8	Li Zhixin (CHN)	26.55	
8	7	Hua Dongdong (CHN)	26.62	

=== S12 ===
The Men's 50 metre freestyle S12 event was held on 23 September. The relevant records at the beginning of the event were as follows:

Record	Athlete	Time	Date	City	Country
World	Maksym Veraksa (UKR)	0:22.99	2009-10-21	Reykjavík	Iceland
Championship	Maksym Veraksa (UKR)	0:23.36	2013-08-15	Montreal	Canada
African	Franco Smit (RSA)	0:25.30	2019-09-11	London	United Kingdom
Americas	Tucker Dupree (USA)	0:24.03	2016-07-01	Charlotte	United States
Asian	Maulana Rifky Yavianda (INA)	0:24.76	2021-06-19	Berlin	Germany
European	Maksym Veraksa (UKR)	0:22.99	2009-10-21	Reykjavík	Iceland
Oceania	Braedan Jason (AUS)	0:24.56	2022-07-30	Birmingham	United Kingdom

==== Heats ====
Fourteen swimmers took part, with the top eight progressing to the final.

Rank	Heat	Lane	Athlete	Class	Time	Notes
1	1	4	Maksym Veraksa (UKR)	S12	24.07	Q
2	1	5	Raman Salei (AZE)	S12	24.39	Q
3	2	4	Illia Yaremenko (UKR)	S12	24.40	Q
4	2	5	Dzmitry Salei (AIN)	S12	24.69	Q
5	1	3	Kylian Portal (FRA)	S12	25.08	Q
6	2	3	Timofei Guk (AIN)	S12	25.10	Q
7	2	6	Oleksii Fedyna (UKR)	S12	25.36	Q
8	1	6	Alex Villarejo Martin (ESP)	S12	25.41	Q
9	2	2	Douglas Matera (BRA)	S12	25.67	
10	2	1	Egor Kuzmin (AIN)	S12	25.74	
11	1	7	Arsenii Berezhnoi (AIN)	S12	25.08	
12	1	1	Uladzimir Izotau (AIN)	S12	26.07	
13	1	2	Juan Ferron Gutierrez (ESP)	S12	26.14	
14	2	7	Nurdaulet Zhumagali (KAZ)	S12	30.44	

==== Final ====
Rank	Lane	Athlete	Class	Time	Notes
1st place, gold medalist(s)	3	Illia Yaremenko (UKR)	S12	24.16	
2nd place, silver medalist(s)	5	Raman Salei (AZE)	S12	24.27	
3rd place, bronze medalist(s)	4	Maksym Veraksa (UKR)	S12	24.31	
4	6	Dzmitry Salei (AIN)	S12	24.62	
5	2	Kylian Portal (FRA)	S12	24.72	
6	7	Timofei Guk (AIN)	S12	25.18	
7	8	Alex Villarejo Martin (ESP)	S12	25.30	
7	1	Oleksii Fedyna (UKR)	S12	25.30	

=== S13 ===
The men's 50 metre freestyle S13 event was held on 25 September. The relevant records at the beginning of the event were as follows:

Record	Athlete	Time	Date	City	Country
World	Ihar Boki (BLR)	0:23.20	2015-07-13	Glasgow	United Kingdom
Championship	Ihar Boki (BLR)	0:23.20	2015-07-13	Glasgow	United Kingdom
African	Charles Bouwer (RSA)	0:23.99	2012-09-01	London	United Kingdom
Americas	Nicolas Guy Turbide (CAN)	0:23.88	2023-08-04	Manchester	United Kingdom
Asian	Islam Aslanov (UZB)	0:23.31	2018-10-11	Jakarta	Indonesia
European	Ihar Boki (BLR)	0:23.20	2015-07-13	Glasgow	United Kingdom
Oceania	Timothy Antalfy (AUS)	0:24.26	2012-09-01	London	United Kingdom

==== Heats ====
Nine swimmers took part, with the top eight progressing to the final.

Rank	Heat	Lane	Athlete	Class	Time	Notes
1	1	4	Vitalii Tsybriuk (AIN)	S13	23.57	Q
2	1	5	Oleksii Virchenko (UKR)	S13	23.81	Q
3	1	3	Egor Shchitkovskii (AIN)	S13	24.07	Q
4	1		Taliso Engel (GER)	S13	24.48	Q
5	1	7	Egor Bolotov (UZB)	S13	24.67	Q
6	1	8	Nathan Hendricks (RSA)	S13	24.92	Q
7	1	6	Nicolas Guy Turbide (CAN)	S13	24.96	Q
8	1	1	Enrique Mollar (ESP)	S13	25.12	Q
9	1	0	Gabriel Steen (NOR)	S13	25.75	

==== Final ====
Rank	Lane	Athlete	Class	Time	Notes
1st place, gold medalist(s)	5	Oleksii Virchenko (UKR)	S13	23.31	
2nd place, silver medalist(s)	4	Vitalii Tsybriuk (AIN)	S13	23.58	
3rd place, bronze medalist(s)	3	Egor Shchitkovskii (AIN)	S13	23.93	
4	6	Taliso Engel (GER)	S13	24.21	
5	8	Enrique Mollar (ESP)	S13	24.74	
6	1	Nicolas Guy Turbide (CAN)	S13	24.79	
7	7	Nathan Hendricks (RSA)	S13	24.80	
8	2	Egor Bolotov (UZB)	S13	24.84	
