= 2025 World Para Swimming Championships – Men's 100 metre freestyle =

The men's 100 metre freestyle events at the 2025 World Para Swimming Championships were held at the Singapore Aquatic Centre between 21 and 27 September 2025. Racing will occur over eleven classifications.

== Schedule ==
The 100 metre freestyle events for men will be held across the following schedule:

men's 100 metre freestyle
Day	Date	Classifications
Day 1	21 Sept	
Day 2	22 Sept	S4; S6
Day 3	23 Sept	S13
Day 4	24 Sept	S8; S9
Day 5	25 Sept	S11; S12
Day 6	26 Sept	S10
Day 7	27 Sept	S3; S5; S7

== Medal summary ==
Event	Gold	Silver	Bronze
S3	Gabriele Lorenzo; Italy	Denys Ostapchenko; Ukraine	Josia Topf; Germany
S4	Ami Omer Dadaon; Israel	Federico Cristiani; Italy	Angel Camacho; Mexico
S5	Oleksandr Komarov; Ukraine	Artem Oliinyk; Ukraine	Kirill Pulver; Individual Neutral Athletes
S6	Antonio Fantin; Italy	Nelson Crispín; Colombia Vladyslav Koshman; Ukraine	not awarded
S7	Andrii Trusov; Ukraine	Federico Bicelli; Italy	Aleksei Ganiuk; Individual Neutral Athletes
S8	Callum Simpson; Australia	Alberto Amodeo; Italy	Eduard Horodianyn; Ukraine
S9	Simone Barlaam; Italy	Hector Denayer; France	Ugo Didier; France
S10; Details	Rowan Crothers; Australia	Stefano Raimondi; Italy	Ihor Nimchenko; Ukraine
S11	David Kratochvíl; Czech Republic	Danylo Chufarov; Ukraine	Rogier Dorsman; Netherlands
S12	Kylian Portal; France	Maksym Veraksa; Ukraine	Raman Salei; Azerbaijan
S13	Egor Shchitkovskii; Individual Neutral Athletes	Vitalii Tsybriuk; Individual Neutral Athletes	Egor Bolotov; Uzbekistan

== Race summaries ==
=== S3 ===
The men's 100 metre freestyle S3 event was held on 27 September.

The relevant records at the beginning of the event were as follows:

Record	Athlete	Time	Date	City	Country
World	Diego Lopez Diaz (MEX)	1:32.69	2018-06-08	Berlin	Germany
Championship	Diego Lopez Diaz (MEX)	1:33.61	2019-09-13	London	United Kingdom
African	Youssef Elsayed (EGY)	2:15.32	2023-03-16	Sheffield	United Kingdom
Americas	Diego Lopez Diaz (MEX)	1:32.69	2018-06-08	Berlin	Germany
Asian	Li Hanhua (CHN)	1:34.04	2010-12-16	Guangzhou	China
European	Dmytro Vynohradets' (UKR)	1:34.02	2010-08-18	Eindhoven	Netherlands
Oceania	Ahmed Kelly (AUS)	1:52.11	2023-08-06	Manchester	United Kingdom

==== Heats ====
13 swimmers took part, with the top eight progressing to the final.

Rank	Heat	Lane	Athlete	Time	Note
1	2	4	Gabriele Lorenzo (ITA)	1:38.95	Q
2	1	4	Denys Ostapchenko (UKR)	1:39.40	Q
3	2	5	Serhii Palamarchuk (UKR)	1:40.35	Q
4	1	5	Umut Unlu (TUR)	1:40.99	Q
5	1	2	Diego López Díaz (MEX)	1:46.22	Q
6	2	3	Josia Topf (GER)	1:46.82	Q
7	1	3	Vincenzo Boni (ITA)	1:48.21	Q
8	1	6	Isaias Sono (PER)	1:48.70	Q
9	2	6	Daniel Ferrer Tobles (ESP)	1:49.63	R
10	1	7	Marco Tinamisan (PHI)	1:50.75	R
11	2	2	Krzysztof Lechniak (POL)	1:51.41	R
12	2	7	Marcos Zárate (MEX)	1:55.23	
13	2	1	Patrico Larenas (CHI)	2:06.43	

==== Final ====
Rank	Lane	Athlete	Result	Notes
1st place, gold medalist(s)	4	Gabriele Lorenzo (ITA)	1:33.25	CR
2nd place, silver medalist(s)	5	Denys Ostapchenko (UKR)	1:37.29	
3rd place, bronze medalist(s)	7	Josia Topf (GER)	1:38.79	
4	6	Umut Unlu (TUR)	1:39.53	
5	3	Serhii Palamarchuk (UKR)	1:41.51	
6	2	Diego Lopez Diaz (MEX)	1:45.86	
7	1	Vincenzo Boni (ITA)	1:46.13	
8	8	Isaias Sono (PER)	1:47.29	

=== S4 ===
The men's 100 metre freestyle S4 event will be held on 22 September. The relevant records at the beginning of the event were as follows:

Record	Athlete	Time	Date	City	Country
World	Ami Omer Dadaon (ISR)	1:18.94	2023-08-01	Manchester	United Kingdom
Championship	Ami Omer Dadaon (ISR)	1:18.94	2023-08-01	Manchester	United Kingdom
Americas	Angel Camacho (MEX)	1:22.32	2024-08-30	Paris	France
Asian	Takayuki Suzuki (JPN)	1:21.53	2021-06-18	Berlin	Germany
European	Ami Omer Dadaon (ISR)	1:18.94	2023-08-01	Manchester	United Kingdom
Oceania	Cameron Leslie (NZL)	1:21.80	2022-06-13	Funchal	Portugal

==== Heats ====
Nine swimmers will take part, with the top eight progressing to the final.

Rank	Heat	Lane	Athlete	Class	Result	Notes
1	1	4	Ami Omer Dadaon (ISR)	S4	1:22.22	Q
2	1	5	Federico Cristiani (ITA)	S4	1:23.56	Q
3	1	3	Angel De Jesus Camacho Ramirez (MEX)	S4	1:25.09	Q
4	1	2	Luigi Beggiato (ITA)	S4	1:26.66	Q
5	1	6	Roman Zhdanov (AIN)	S4	1:29.76	Q
6	1	1	Gustavo Ramon Sanchez Martinez (MEX)	S4	1:30.27	Q
7	1	7	Cameron Leslie (NZL)	S4	1:34.43	Q
8	1	0	Arnost Petracek (CZE)	S4	1:37.51	Q
9	1	8	Ariel Malyar (ISR)	S4	1:42.00	

==== Final ====
Rank	Lane	Athlete	Class	Result	Notes
1st place, gold medalist(s)	4	Ami Omer Dadaon (ISR)	S4	1:19.49	
2nd place, silver medalist(s)	5	Federico Cristiani (ITA)	S4	1:21.27	
3rd place, bronze medalist(s)	3	Angel De Jesus Camacho Ramirez (MEX)	S4	1:23.39	
4	2	Roman Zhdanov (AIN)	S4	1:24.16	
5	6	Luigi Beggiato (ITA)	S4	1:24.78	
6	1	Cameron Leslie (NZL)	S4	1:30.77	
7	7	Gustavo Ramon Sanchez Martinez (MEX)	S4	1:30.78	
8	8	Arnost Petracek (CZE)	S4	1:40.57	

=== S5 ===
The men's 100 metre freestyle S5 event will be held on 27 September. . The relevant records at the beginning of the event were as follows:

Record	Athlete	Time	Date	City	Country
World	Antonio Fantin (ITA)	1:06.24	2019-03-03	Bologna	Italy
Championship	Francesco Bocciardo (ITA)	1:07.76	2019-09-15	London	United Kingdom
African	Zeyad Kahil (EGY)	1:23.42	2024-04-27	Funchal	Portugal
Americas	Daniel Dias (BRA)	1:08.39	2012-09-02	London	United Kingdom
Asian	Guo Jincheng (CHN)	1:08.22	2024-08-30	Paris	France
European	Antonio Fantin (ITA)	1:06.24	2019-03-03	Bologna	Italy

==== Heats ====
Sixteen swimmers will take part, with the top eight progressing to the final.

Rank	Heat	Lane	Athlete	Time	Note
1	2	5	Kirill Pulver (AIN)	1:10.99	Q
2	1	5	Francesco Bocciardo (ITA)	1:12.05	Q
3	2	4	Oleksandr Komarov (UKR)	1:12.84	Q
4	2	3	Artem Oliinyk (UKR)	1:13.05	Q
5	1	2	Samuel de Oliveira (BRA)	1:13.59	Q
6	1	3	Antoni Ponce Bertran (ESP)	1:14.48	Q
7	1	6	Koral Berkin Kutlu (TUR)	1:15.14	Q
8	1	4	Jincheng Guo (CHN)	1:15.18	Q
9	1	7	Noam Katav (ISR)	1:15.86	R
10	2	1	Luis Huerta Poza (ESP)	1:18.15	R
11	2	7	Kaede Hinata (JPN)	1:19.63	R
12	1	1	Eigo Tanaka (JPN)	1:21.50	
13	2	8	Phuchit Aingchaiyaphum (THA)	1:21.52	
14	1	8	Sebastian Massabie (CAN)	1:22.17	
15	2	6	Weiyi Yuan (CHN)	1:24.44	
	2	2	Muhammad Nur Syaiful Zulkafli (MAS)	DNS	

==== Final ====
Rank	Lane	Athlete	Time	Note
1st place, gold medalist(s)	3	Oleksandr Komarov (UKR)	1:08.86	
2nd place, silver medalist(s)	6	Artem Oliinyk (UKR)	1:09.27	
3rd place, bronze medalist(s)	4	Kirill Pulver (AIN)	1:09.98	
4	5	Francesco Bocciardo (ITA)	1:11.67	
5	8	Guo Jincheng (CHN)	1:11.99	
6	1	Koral Berin Kutlu (TUR)	1:13.66	
7	7	Antoni Ponce Bertran (ESP)	1:13.82	
8	2	Samuel De Oliveira (BRA)	1:17.75	

=== S6 ===
The men's 100 metre freestyle S6 event was held on 22 September. The relevant records at the beginning of the event were as follows:

Record	Athlete	Time	Date	City	Country
World	Antonio Fantin (ITA)	1:02.70	2024-03-14	Lignano Sabbiadoro	Italy
Championship	Antonio Fantin (ITA)	1:02.98	2023-08-01	Manchester	United Kingdom
African	Ahmed Ali (EGY)	1:17.97	2019-09-10	London	United Kingdom
Americas	Nelson Crispín (COL)	1:04.59	2022-04-01	Berlin	Germany
Asian	Jia Hongguang (CHN)	1:05.55	2021-09-01	Tokyo	Japan
European	Antonio Fantin (ITA)	1:02.70	2024-03-17	Lignano Sabbiadoro	Italy
Oceania	Matthew Haanappel (AUS)	1:08.63	2013-12-20	Adelaide	Australia

==== Heats ====
Eleven swimmers took part, with the top eight progressing to the final.

Rank	Heat	Lane	Athlete	Class	Result	Notes
1	2	4	Antonio Fantin (ITA)	S6	1:04.75	Q
2	1	4	Laurent Chardard (FRA)	S6	1:06.66	Q
3	2	5	Talisson Henrique Glock (BRA)	S6	1:07.26	Q
4	1	5	Nelson Crispín (COL)	S6	1:07.41	Q
5	2	6	David Rendón (COL)	S6	1:07.69	Q
6	1	6	Santiago León (COL)	S6	1:07.83	Q
7	2	3	Vladyslav Koshman (UKR)	S6	1:08.12	Q
8	1	3	Mikhail Evseenko (AIN)	S6	1:09.20	Q
9	2	2	Qian Tang (CHN)	S6	1:12.84	
10	1	2	Gary Bejino (PHI)	S6	1:14.72	
11	2	7	Josue Rodrigo (ESA)	S6	1:17.76	

==== Final ====
Rank	Lane	Athlete	Class	Result	Notes
1st place, gold medalist(s)	4	Antonio Fantin (ITA)	S6	1:03.32	
2nd place, silver medalist(s)	6	Nelson Crispín (COL)	S6	1:05.20	
2nd place, silver medalist(s)	1	Vladyslav Koshman (UKR)	S6	1:05.20	
4	5	Laurent Chardard (FRA)	S6	1:06.35	
5	7	Santiago León (COL)	S6	1:07.30	
6	3	Talisson Glock (BRA)	S6	1:07.72	
7	2	David Rendón (COL)	S6	1:07.74	
8	8	Mikhail Evseenko (AIN)	S6	1:08.49	

=== S7 ===
The men's 100 metre freestyle S7 event was held on 27 September. The relevant records at the beginning of the event were as follows:

Record	Athlete	Time	Date	City	Country
World	Andrii Trusov (UKR)	0:59.62	2024-04-27	Funchal	Portugal
Championship	Andrii Trusov (UKR)	1:00.09	2023-08-06	Manchester	United Kingdom
African	Christian Sadie (RSA)	1:05.49	2024-04-27	Funchal	Portugal
Americas	Carlos Serrano Zárate (COL)	1:00.97	2023-11-21	Santiago	Chile
Asian	Pan Shiyun (CHN)	1:00.57	2012-09-03	London	United Kingdom
European	Andrii Trusov (UKR)	0:59.62	2024-04-27	Funchal	Portugal
Oceania	Matthew Levy (AUS)	1:01.38	2012-09-03	London	United Kingdom

==== Heats ====
Fourteen swimmers took part, with the top eight progressing to the final.

Rank	Heat	Lane	Athlete	Class	Result	Notes
1	1	3	Aleksei Ganiuk (AIN)	S7	1:03.89	Q
2	2	4	Andrii Trusov (UKR)	S7	1:04.76	Q
3	1	4	Federico Bicelli (ITA)	S7	1:05.80	Q
4	2	5	Wei Soong Toh (SGP)	S7	1:05.84	Q
5	1	5	Christian Sadie (RSA)	S7	1:06.54	Q
6	2	7	Sardor Bakhtiyorov (UZB)	S7	1:07.03	Q
7	2	2	Darius Dumitru (ROU)	S7	1:07.09	Q
8	2	6	Yaroslav Karpenko (UKR)	S7	1:07.28	Q
9	1	6	Karlo Knezevic (CRO)	S7	1:09.41	
10	1	2	Ernie Gawilan (PHI)	S7	1:09.76	
11	2	3	Jurijs Semjonovs (LAT)	S7	1:10.02	
12	1	7	Adin Williams (USA)	S7	1:11.73	
13	2	1	Zaur Mushkudiani (GEO)	S7	1:19.38	

==== Final ====
Rank	Lane	Athlete	Class	Result	Notes
1st place, gold medalist(s)	5	Andrii Trusov (UKR)	S7	59.90	CR
2nd place, silver medalist(s)	3	Federico Bicelli (ITA)	S7	1:00.80	
3rd place, bronze medalist(s)	4	Aleksei Ganiuk (AIN)	S7	1:03.67	
4	2	Christian Sadie (RSA)	S7	1:04.77	AF
5	6	Wei Soong Toh (SGP)	S7	1:04.83	
6	8	Yaroslav Karpenko (UKR)	S7	1:06.51	
7	7	Sardor Bakhtiyorov (UZB)	S7	1:07.08	
8	8	Darius Dumitru (ROU)	S7	1:07.10	

=== S8 ===
The men's 100 metre freestyle S8 event will be held on 24 September. The relevant records at the beginning of the event were as follows:

Record	Athlete	Time	Date	City	Country
World	Denis Tarasov (RUS)	0:55.84	2015-07-16	Glasgow	United Kingdom
Championship	Denis Tarasov (RUS)	0:55.84	2015-07-16	Glasgow	United Kingdom
African	Cristiaan Du Plessis (RSA)	1:05.58	2010-08-20	Eindhoven	Netherlands
Americas	Noah Jaffe (USA)	0:58.25	2024-09-06	Paris	France
Asian	Wang Yinan (CHN)	0:56.58	2012-09-06	London	United Kingdom
European	Denis Tarasov (RUS)	0:55.84	2015-07-16	Glasgow	United Kingdom
Oceania	Ben Popham (AUS)	0:57.37	2021-08-25	Tokyo	Japan

==== Heats ====
Twelve swimmers took part, with the top eight progressing to the final.

Rank	Heat	Lane	Athlete	Time	Note
1	2	4	Callum Simpson (AUS)	57.89	Q
2	2	5	Alberto Amodeo (ITA)	58.98	Q
3	1	7	Eduard Horodianyn (UKR)	59.10	Q
4	2	6	Reid Maxwell (CAN)	59.57	Q
5	1	4	Noah Jaffe (USA)	59.75	Q
6	2	3	Dimosthenis Michalentzakis (GRE)	1:00.85	Q
7	1	5	Andrei Nikolaev (AIN)	1:00.87	Q
8	1	6	Turgut Aslan Yaraman (TUR)	1:00.98	Q
9	1	3	Gabriel Silva de Souza (BRA)	1:01.87	R
10	2	2	Liu Fengqi (CHN)	1:02.91	R
11	1	2	Michal Golus (POL)	1:03.05	

==== Final ====
Rank	Lane	Athlete	Time	Note
1st place, gold medalist(s)	4	Callum Simpson (AUS)	57.15	OCR
2nd place, silver medalist(s)	5	Alberto Amodeo (ITA)	57.88	
3rd place, bronze medalist(s)	3	Eduard Horodianyn (UKR)	58.14	
4	6	Reid Maxwell (CAN)	58.38	
5	2	Noah Jaffe (USA)	58.50	
6	1	Andrei Nikolaev (AIN)	59.12	
7	8	Turgut Aslan Yaraman (TUR)	59.93	
8	7	Dimosthenis Michalentzakis (GRE)	1:01.30	

=== S9 ===
The men's 100 metre freestyle S9 event will be held on 24 September. The relevant records at the beginning of the event were as follows:

Record	Athlete	Time	Date	City	Country
World	Simone Barlaam (ITA)	0:52.23	2022-06-15	Funchal	Portugal
Championship	Simone Barlaam (ITA)	0:52.23	2022-06-15	Funchal	Portugal
African	Hady Abdalla (EGY)	1:05.70	2023-11-10	Cairo	Egypt
Americas	Jamal Hill (USA)	0:56.16	2022-06-15	Funchal	Portugal
Asian	Guo Zhi (CHN)	0:56.00	2010-08-17	Eindhoven	Netherlands
European	Simone Barlaam (ITA)	0:52.23	2022-06-15	Funchal	Portugal
Oceania	Rowan Crothers (AUS)	0:54.18	2014-12-17	Brisbane	Australia

==== Heats ====
Nineteen swimmers will take part, with the top eight progressing to the final.

Rank	Heat	Lane	Athlete	Time	Note
1	2	4	Simone Barlaam (ITA)	55.73	Q
2	1	7	Hector Denayer (FRA)	56.75	Q
3	1	3	Yahor Shchalkanau (AIN)	56.90	Q
4	1	4	Ugo Didier (FRA)	57.02	Q
5	2	5	Bogdan Mozgovoi (AIN)	57.06	Q
6	1	5	Oliwier Krzyszkowski (POL)	57.12	Q
7	2	6	Tommaso Wulzer (ITA)	57.14	Q
8	2	7	Dmytro Vasylenko (UKR)	57.32	Q
9	2	3	Malte Braunschweig (GER)	57.60	R
10	2	2	Jacobo Garrido Brun (ESP)	57.79	R
11	2	8	Zarif Pouresmaeily (IRI)	57.93	
12	1	2	Anton De Jaeger (BEL)	58.20	
13	1	8	Denis Tarasov (AIN)	58.23	
14	1	6	Simone Ciulli (ITA)	58.42	
15	2	1	Jose Antonio Mari Alcaraz (ESP)	58.43	
16	1	1	Escanilla Candial (ESP)	58.44	
17	2	0	Naveed Rasheen (SRI)	1:00.23	
18	1	0	Mustafa Al-Hayani (IRQ)	1:04.48	
	2	9	Sommik Keovilay (LAO)	DNS	

==== Final ====
Rank	Lane	Athlete	Time	Note
1st place, gold medalist(s)	4	Simone Barlaam (ITA)	52.70	
2nd place, silver medalist(s)	5	Hector Denayer (FRA)	55.89	
3rd place, bronze medalist(s)	6	Ugo Didier (FRA)	56.07	
4	7	Oliwier Krzyszkowski (POL)	56.34	
5	3	Yahor Shchalkanau (AIN)	56.56	
6	2	Bogdan Mozgovoi (AIN)	56.68	
7	8	Dmytro Vasylenko (UKR)	56.88	
8	1	Tommaso Wulzer (ITA)	56.89	

=== S10 ===
The men's 100 metre freestyle S10 event will be held on 26 September.:

Athlete	Time	Date	City	Country
World	Maksym Krypak (UKR)	0:50.64	2021-08-28	Tokyo
Championship	Rowan Crothers (AUS)	0:50.70	2022-06-17	Funchal
African	Kevin Paul (RSA)	0:55.55	2012-09-06	London
Americas	André Brasil (BRA)	0:50.87	2010-08-17	Eindhoven
Asian	Sina Zeyghaminejad (IRI)	0:56.33	2023-10-25	Hangzhou
European	Maksym Krypak (UKR)	0:50.64	2021-08-28	Tokyo
Oceania	Rowan Crothers (AUS)	0:50.70	2022-06-17	Funchal

==== Heats ====
Thirteen swimmers will take part, with the top eight progressing to the final.

Rank	Heat	Lane	Athlete	Time	Note
1	1	4	Rowan Crothers (AUS)	52.47	Q
2	1	5	Ihor Nimchenko (UKR)	53.30	Q
3	2	5	Thomas Gallagher (AUS)	53.50	Q
4	2	4	Stefano Raimondi (ITA)	53.56	Q
5	2	3	Alexander Tuckfield (AUS)	53.64	Q
6	1	6	Jack Gill (CAN)	54.05	Q
7	2	2	Fernando Lu (CAN)	54.69	Q
8	2	6	Alan Ogorzalek (POL)	55.21	Q
9	1	2	Emil Salemgareev (AIN)	55.54	R
10	1	3	Koehn Boyd (USA)	55.90	R
11	2	1	Sina Zeyghaminejad (IRI)	56.42	R
12	2	7	Kieran Williams (GBR)	57.41	
13	1	7	Roan Brennan (GBR)	57.70	

==== Final ====
Rank	Lane	Athlete	Time	Note
1st place, gold medalist(s)	4	Rowan Crothers (AUS)	51.05	
2nd place, silver medalist(s)	6	Stefano Raimondi (ITA)	51.54	
3rd place, bronze medalist(s)	5	Ihor Nimchenko (UKR)	51.66	
4	3	Thomas Gallagher (AUS)	52.09	
5	2	Alexander Tuckfield (AUS)	52.93	
6	7	Jack Gill (CAN)	54.44	
7	1	Fernando Lu (CAN)	54.72	
8	8	Alan Ogorzalek (POL)	55.26	

=== S11 ===
The men's 100 metre freestyle S11 event was held on 25 September. The relevant records at the beginning of the event were as follows:

Record	Athlete	Time	Date	City	Country
World	David Kratochvil (CZE)	0:56.07	2025-05-02	Paris	France
Championship	Rogier Dorsman (NED)	0:56.65	2022-06-16	Funchal	Portugal
African	Hendri Herbst (RSA)	0:59.60	2014-08-08	Pasadena	United States of America
Americas	Bradley Snyder (USA)	0:56.15	2016-09-15	Rio de Janeiro	Brazil
Asian	Yang Bozun (CHN)	0:57.35	2012-08-31	London	United Kingdom
European	David Kratochvil (CZE)	0:56.07	2025-05-02	Paris	France
Oceania	Jeremy McClure (AUS)	1:08.16	2019-09-13	London	United Kingdom

==== Heats ====
Ten swimmers took part, with the top eight progressing to the final.

Rank	Heat	Lane	Athlete	Class	Result	Notes
1	1	4	David Kratochvil (CZE)	S11	57.18	Q
2	1	5	Rogier Dorsman (NED)	S11	1:00.11	Q
3	1	2	Matheus Correa (BRA)	S11	1:00.29	Q
4	1	3	Danylo Chufarov (UKR)	S11	1:00.37	Q
5	1	6	Edgaras Matakas (LTU)	S11	1:00.73	Q
6	1	8	Mahamadou Dambelleh Jarra (ESP)	S11	1:00.75	Q
7	1	7	José Cantero (ESP)	S11	1:00.99	Q
8	1	1	Mykhailo Serbin (UKR)	S11	1:03.99	Q
9	1	0	Alex Kozlowski (POL)	S11	1:04.27	
10	1	9	Simonas Zvirblis (LTU)	S11	1:05.50	

==== Final ====
Rank	Lane	Athlete	Class	Result	Notes
1st place, gold medalist(s)	4	David Kratochvil (CZE)	S11	56.30	CR
2nd place, silver medalist(s)	6	Danylo Chufarov (UKR)	S11	57.46	
3rd place, bronze medalist(s)	5	Rogier Dorsman (NED)	S11	57.61	
4	2	Edgaras Matakas (LTU)	S11	59.87	
5	3	Matheus Correa (BRA)	S11	1:00.13	
6	1	José Cantero (ESP)	S11	1:00.26	
7	8	Mykhailo Serbin (UKR)	S11	1:00.61	
8	7	Mahamadou Dambelleh Jarra (ESP)	S11	1:01.00	

=== S12 ===
The men's 100 metre freestyle S12 event will be held on 24 September. The relevant records at the beginning of the event were as follows:

Record	Athlete	Time	Date	City	Country
World	Maksym Veraksa (UKR)	0:50.91	2009-10-24	Reykjavík	Iceland
Championship	Maksym Veraksa (UKR)	0:51.80	2013-08-12	Montreal	Canada
African	Franco Smit (RSA)	0:56.26	2017-12-07	Mexico City	Mexico
Americas	Tucker Dupree (USA)	0:54.01	2014-04-18	Glasgow	United Kingdom
Asian	Dmitriy Horlin (UZB)	0:53.97	2018-10-07	Jakarta	Indonesia
European	Maksym Veraksa (UKR)	0:50.91	2009-10-24	Reykjavík	Iceland
Oceania	Braedan Jason (AUS)	0:53.78	2021-08-31	Tokyo	Japan

==== Heats ====
Fifteen swimmers will take part, with the top eight progressing to the final.

Rank	Heat	Lane	Athlete	Class	Result	Notes
1	1	5	Ivan Salguero Oteiza (ESP)	S12	54.00	Q
2	1	4	Dzmitry Salei (AIN)	S12	54.79	Q
3	2	4	Maksym Veraksa (UKR)	S12	54.26	Q
4	2	3	Kylian Portal (FRA)	S12	54.63	Q
5	2	5	Raman Salei (AZE)	S12	54.24	Q
6	2	2	Timofei Guk (AIN)	S12	55.26	Q
7	1	2	Douglas Matera (BRA)	S12	55.52	Q
8	2	6	Egor Kuzmin (AIN)	S12	55.69	Q
9	1	6	Alex Villarejo Martin (ESP)	S12	56.03	
10	1	3	Illia Yaremenko (UKR)	S12	56.19	
11	2	7	Arsenii Berezhnoi (AIN)	S12	56.85	
12	1	1	Evan Wilkerson (USA)	S12	57.67	
13	1	7	Juan Ferron Gutierrez (ESP)	S12	58.40	
14	2	8	Roman Mychka (UKR)	S12	59.28	
15	2	1	Maksim Vashkevich (AIN)	S12	59.39	

==== Final ====
Rank	Lane	Athlete	Class	Result	Notes
1st place, gold medalist(s)	6	Kylian Portal (FRA)	S12	53.16	
2nd place, silver medalist(s)	3	Maksym Veraska (UKR)	S12	53.53	
3rd place, bronze medalist(s)	2	Raman Salei (AZE)	S12	54.01	
4	5	Dzmitry Salei (AIN)	S12	54.22	
5	4	Ivan Salguero Oteiza (ESP)	S12	54.25	
6	7	Timofei Guk (AIN)	S12	54.81	
7	1	Douglas Matera (BRA)	S12	55.14	
8	8	Egor Kuzmin (AIN)	S12	55.51	

=== S13 ===
The men's 100 metre freestyle S13 event was held on 23 September. The relevant records at the beginning of the event were as follows:

Record	Athlete	Time	Date	City	Country
World	Ihar Boki (BLR)	0:50.65	2018-08-18	Dublin	Ireland
Championship	Ihar Boki (BLR)	0:50.74	2019-09-11	London	United Kingdom
African	Charles Bouwer (RSA)	0:52.41	2013-08-18	Montreal	Canada
Americas	Carlos Farrenberg (BRA)	0:53.63	2016-09-16	Rio de Janeiro	Brazil
Asian	Islam Aslanov (UZB)	0:51.52	2018-10-07	Jakarta	Indonesia
European	Ihar Boki (BLR)	0:50.65	2018-08-18	Dublin	Ireland
Oceania	Timothy Antalfy (AUS)	0:52.55	2012-03-19	Adelaide	Australia

==== Heats ====
Eleven swimmers took part, with the top eight progressing to the final.

Rank	Heat	Lane	Athlete	Time	Note
1	2	4	Oleksii Virchenko (UKR)	52.94	Q
2	1	4	Egor Shchitkovskii (AIN)	53.01	Q
3	2	3	Egor Bolotov (UZB)	53.30	Q
4	1	5	Vitalii Tsybriuk (AIN)	54.11	Q
5	2	5	Alex Portal (FRA)	54.27	Q
6	1	3	Nathan Hendricks (RSA)	54.28	Q
7	2	6	E Alhambra Mollar (ESP)	54.59	Q
8	1	2	Evgenii Lazutin (AIN)	55.21	Q
9	1	6	Pedro Fernandez Garcia (ESP)	57.79	R
10	2	7	Philip Hebmueller (GER)	58.42	R
-	2	2	Gabriel Steen (NOR)	DNS	

==== Final ====
Rank	Lane	Athlete	Time	Note
1st place, gold medalist(s)	5	Egor Shchitkovskii (AIN)	51.27	
2nd place, silver medalist(s)	6	Vitalii Tsybriuk (AIN)	52.34	
3rd place, bronze medalist(s)	3	Egor Bolotov (UZB)	53.13	
4	4	Oleksii Virchenko (UKR)	53.17	
5	2	Alex Portal (FRA)	53.22	
6	1	E Alhambra Mollar (ESP)	53.64	
7	7	Nathan Hendricks (RSA)	54.81	
8	8	Evgenii Lazutin (AIN)	55.18	
