= 2025 World Para Swimming Championships – Men's 100 metre butterfly =

The men's 100 m butterfly events at the 2025 World Para Swimming Championships will be held at the Singapore Aquatic Centre between 21 and 27 September 2025 across seven classifications.

== Schedule ==
Men's 100 m butterfly events for men will be held across the following schedule:

Men's 100 m butterfly
Day	Date	Classifications
Day 1	21 Sept	S13
Day 2	22 Sept	S11; S12
Day 3	23 Sept	S8; S9
Day 4	24 Spt	-
Day 5	25 Sept	S10
Day 6	26 Sept	-
Day 7	27 Sept	S14

== Medal summary ==
Event	Gold	Silver	Bronze
S8	Li Ting; China	Alberto Amodeo; Italy	Eduard Horodianyn; Ukraine
S9	Simone Barlaam; Italy	Timothy Hodge; Australia	Lewis Bishop; Australia
S10	Stefano Raimondi; Italy	Ihor Nimchenko; Ukraine	Col Pearse; Australia
S11	David Kratochvíl; Czech Republic	Thomaz Matera; Brazil	Keiichi Kimura; Japan
S12	Kylian Portal; France	Dzmitry Salei; Individual Neutral Athletes	Raman Salei; Azerbaijan
S13	Egor Shchitkovskii; Individual Neutral Athletes	Oleksii Virchenko; Ukraine	Alex Portal; France
S14	William Ellard; Great Britain	Gabriel Bandeira; Brazil	Alexander Hillhouse; Denmark

== Race summaries ==
=== S8 ===
The men's 100 m butterfly S8 event will be held on the morning and evening of 23 September.

The relevant records in the lead up to this event where as follows:

Record	Athlete	Time	Date	City	Country
World	Song Maodang (CHN)	0:59.19	2016-09-09	Rio de Janeiro	Brazil
Championship	Xu Haijiao (CHN)	0:59.70	2017-12-06	Mexico City	Mexico
African	Kaleb van der Merwe (RSA)	1:13.44	2017-04-05	Durban	South Africa
Americas	Robert Griswold (USA)	1:02.03	2021-09-03	Tokyo	Japan
Asian	Song Maodang (CHN)	0:59.19	2016-09-09	Rio de Janeiro	Brazil
European	Denis Tarasov (RUS)	1:00.75	2013-08-16	Montreal	Canada
Oceania	Peter Leek (AUS)	1:00.45	2010-08-19	Eindhoven	Netherlands

==== Heats ====
Twelve swimmers will take part, with the top eight progressing to the final.

Rank	Heat	Lane	Athlete	Time	Note
1	1	4	Li Ting (CHN)	1:04.54	Q
2	2	3	Noah Jaffe (USA)	1:04.64	Q
3	2	4	Alberto Amodeo (ITA)	1:04.72	Q
4	1	6	Eduard Horodianyn (UKR)	1:05.02	Q
5	1	5	Michal Golus (POL)	1:05.06	Q
6	2	5	G Silva De Souza (BRA)	1:05.92	Q
7	1	3	Inigo Llopis Sanz (ESP)	1:06.23	Q
8	2	7	Azizbek Boynazarov (UZB)	1:06.67	Q
9	2	6	Sergio Martos Minguet (ESP)	1:06.81	R
10	2	2	Reid Maxwell (CAN)	1:07.50	R
11	1	2	Turgut Aslan Yaraman (TUR)	1:08.14	
12	1	7	Maksim Baskakov (AIN)	1:11.76	

==== Final ====
Rank	Lane	Athlete	Time	Note
1st place, gold medalist(s)	4	Li Ting (CHN)	1:02.12	
2nd place, silver medalist(s)	3	Alberto Amodeo (ITA)	1:02.87	
3rd place, bronze medalist(s)	6	Eduard Horodianyn (UKR)	1:03.36	
4	5	Noah Jaffe (USA)	1:04.49	
5	2	Michal Golus (POL)	1:05.01	
6	8	Azizbek Boynazarov (UZB)	1:05.24	
7	7	Gabriele Silva (BRA)	1:05.63	
8	1	Inigo Llopis Sanz (ESP)	1:07.43	

=== S9 ===
The men's 100 m butterfly S9 event will be held on the morning and evening of 23 September.

The relevant records in the lead up to this event where as follows:

Record	Athlete	Time	Date	City	Country
World	William Martin (AUS)	0:57.19	2021-09-02	Tokyo	Japan
Championship	Simone Barlaam (ITA)	0:58.25	2023-08-02	Manchester	United Kingdom
African	Mohammed Reda Dakouane (MAR)	1:08.32	2025-05-03	Paris	France
Americas	Juan Castillo Estevez (CUB)	1:01.93	2016-09-15	Rio de Janeiro	Brazil
Asian	Guo Zhi (CHN)	1:00.11	2008-09-07	Beijing	China
European	Simone Barlaam (ITA)	0:57.99	2024-09-06	Paris	France
Oceania	William Martin (AUS)	0:57.19	2021-09-02	Tokyo	Japan

==== Heats ====
Seventeen swimmers will take part, with the top eight progressing to the final.

Rank	Heat	Lane	Athlete	Time	Note
1	2	4	Simone Barlaam (ITA)	59.64	Q
2	1	4	Timothy Hodge (AUS)	1:00.64	Q
3	2	5	Lewis Bishop (AUS)	1:01.29	Q
4	2	6	Jacobo Garrido Brun (ESP)	1:01.79	Q
5	1	5	Malte Braunschweig (GER)	1:01.91	Q
6	1	3	Yahor Shchalkanau (AIN)	1:02.03	Q
7	1	6	Xie Zhili (CHN)	1:02.17	Q
8	2	2	Jose Antonio Mari Alcaraz (ESP)	1:02.23	Q
9	2	7	Hector Denayer (FRA)	1:02.62	R
10	2	8	Victor dos Santos Almeida (BRA)	1:02.91	R
11	1	2	Simone Ciulli (ITA)	1:03.11	
12	2	3	Barry McClements (IRL)	1:03.29	
13	1	1	Anton de Jaeger (BEL)	1:03.39	
14	2	0	Brenden Hall (AUS)	1:03.80	
15	2	1	Taiyo Kawabuchi (JPN)	1:03.99	
16	1	8	Sam de Visser (BEL)	1:04.37	
17	1	7	Jonas Kesnar (CZE)	1:05.34	

==== Final ====
Rank	Lane	Athlete	Time	Note
1st place, gold medalist(s)	4	Simone Barlaam (ITA)	57.96	
2nd place, silver medalist(s)	5	Timothy Hodge (AUS)	1:00.13	
3rd place, bronze medalist(s)	3	Lewis Bishop (AUS)	1:01.14	
4	2	Malte Braunschweig (GER)	1:01.26	
5	6	Jacobo Garrido Brun (ESP)	1:01.27	
6	7	Yahor Shchalkanau (AIN)	1:01.73	
7	1	Xie Zhili (CHN)	1:01.78	
8	8	Jose Antonio Mari Alcaraz (ESP)	1:01.92	

=== S10 ===
The men's 100 m butterfly S10 event was held on the morning and evening of 25 September.

The relevant records in the lead up to this event where as follows:

Record	Athlete	Time	Date	City	Country
World	Maksym Krypak (UKR)	0:54.15	2021-08-31	Tokyo	Japan
Championship	Stefano Raimondi (ITA)	0:54.67	2022-06-16	Funchal	Portugal
African	Achmat Hassiem (RSA)	0:57.76	2012-09-01	London	United Kingdom
Americas	André Brasil (BRA)	0:55.99	2010-08-15	Eindhoven	Netherlands
Asian	Akito Minai (JPN)	0:59.30	2024-05-05	Yokohama	Japan
European	Maksym Krypak (UKR)	0:54.15	2021-08-31	Tokyo	Japan
Oceania	Alex Saffy (AUS)	0:56.61	2024-09-03	Paris	France

==== Heats ====
13 swimmers took part, with the top eight progressing to the final

Rank	Heat	Lane	Athlete	Class	Result	Notes
1	1	4	Ihor Nimchenko (UKR)	S10	57.49	Q
2	2	3	Col Pearse (AUS)	S10	57.56	Q
3	2	5	Koehn Boyd (USA)	S10	57.71	Q
4	2	4	Stefano Raimondi (ITA)	S10	58.53	Q
5	1	5	Alex Saffy (AUS)	S10	58.69	Q
6	1	3	Fernando Lu (CAN)	S10	59.10	Q
7	2	6	Riccardo Menciotti (ITA)	S10	59.67	Q
8	1	7	Jack Gill (CAN)	S10	1:00.26	Q
9	2	7	Alan Ogorzalek (POL)	S10	1:00.42	
10	1	6	Dmitrii Grigorev (AIN)	S10	1:00.54	
11	2	2	Alec Elliot (CAN)	S10	1:01.27	
12	2	1	Tadeas Strasik (CZE)	S10	1:01.45	
13	1	2	Stanislav Popov (UKR)	S10	1:05.70	

==== Final ====
Rank	Lane	Athlete	Class	Result	Notes
1st place, gold medalist(s)	6	Stefano Raimondi (ITA)	S10	54.88	
2nd place, silver medalist(s)	4	Ihor Nimchenko (UKR)	S10	54.99	
3rd place, bronze medalist(s)	5	Col Pearse (AUS)	S10	56.56	OC
4	2	Alex Saffy (AUS)	S10	56.73	
5	3	Koehn Boyd (USA)	S10	56.96	
6	7	Fernando Lu (CAN)	S10	58.45	
7	1	Riccardo Menciotti (ITA)	S10	58.75	
8	8	Jack Gill (CAN)	S10	59.58	

=== S11 ===
The men's 100 m butterfly S11 event will be held on the morning and evening of 22 September.

The relevant records in the lead up to this event where as follows:

Record	Athlete	Time	Date	City	Country
World	Danylo Chufarov (UKR)	1:00.66	2023-08-01	Manchester	United Kingdom
Championship	Danylo Chufarov (UKR)	1:00.66	2023-08-01	Manchester	United Kingdom
Americas	John Morgan (USA)	1:03.50	1992-09-08	Barcelona	Spain
Asian	Keiichi Kimura (JPN)	1:00.90	2024-09-06	Paris	France
European	Danylo Chufarov (UKR)	1:00.66	2023-08-01	Manchester	United Kingdom

==== Heats ====
Eleven swimmers will take part, with the top eight progressing to the final.

Rank	Heat	Lane	Athlete	Time	Note
1	1	4	David Kratochvil (CZE)	1:02.98	Q
2	2	5	Thomaz Matera (BRA)	1:03.20	Q AMR
3	2	4	Keiichi Kimura (JPN)	1:03.49	Q
4	1	3	Li Zhixin (CHN)	1:04.27	Q
5	1	5	Danylo Chufarov (UKR)	1:04.35	Q
6	2	3	Uchu Tomita (JPN)	1:05.51	Q
7	2	6	Mykhailo Serbin (UKR)	1:07.44	Q
8	1	6	Albert Gelis (ESP)	1:07.50	Q
9	1	2	Alex Kozlowski (POL)	1:13.86	R
10	2	2	Hua Dongdong (CHN)	1:17.13	R
11	2	7	Himanshu Nandal (IND)	1:18.87	R

==== Final ====
Rank	Lane	Athlete	Time	Note
1st place, gold medalist(s)	4	David Kratochvil (CZE)	1:00.83	
2nd place, silver medalist(s)	5	Thomaz Matera (BRA)	1:02.39	AMR
3rd place, bronze medalist(s)	3	Keiichi Kimura (JPN)	1:02.63	
4	2	Danylo Chufarov (UKR)	1:02.99	
5	6	Li Zhixin (CHN)	1:03.42	
6	7	Uchu Tomita (JPN)	1:04.14	
7	1	Mykhailo Serbin (UKR)	1:05.69	
8	8	Albert Gelis (ESP)	1:06.93	

=== S12 ===
The men's 100 m butterfly S12 event will be held on the morning and evening of 22 September.

The relevant records in the lead up to this event where as follows:

Record	Athlete	Time	Date	City	Country
World	Stephen Clegg (GBR)	0:56.75	2021-04-11	Sheffield	United Kingdom
Championship	Roman Makarov (RUS)	0:56.84	2013-08-13	Montreal	Canada
Americas	Douglas Matera (BRA)	0:58.28	2023-08-01	Manchester	United Kingdom
Asian	Dmitriy Horlin (UZB)	0:59.21	2017-04-29	Sheffield	United Kingdom
European	Stephen Clegg (GBR)	0:56.75	2021-04-11	Sheffield	United Kingdom
Oceania	Braedan Jason (AUS)	0:59.01	2021-09-03	Tokyo	Japan

==== Heats ====
10 swimmers will take part, with the top eight progressing to the final.

Rank	Heat	Lane	Athlete	Time	Note
1	1	5	Raman Salei (AZE)	57.85	Q
2	1	3	Kylian Portal (FRA)	58.41	Q
3	1	4	Dzmitry Salei (AIN)	58.52	Q
4	1	6	Egor Kuzmin (AIN)	59.40	Q
5	1	2	Juan Ferrón Gutiérrez (ESP)	59.65	Q
6	1	0	Timofei Guk (AIN)	1:00.10	Q
7	1	1	Maksim Vashkevich (AIN)	1:00.41	Q
8	1	7	Douglas Matera (BRA)	1:01.22	Q
9	1	8	Deng Jieqiu (CHN)	1:01.63	R
10	1	9	Evan Wilkerson (USA)	1:05.49	R

==== Final ====
Rank	Lane	Athlete	Time	Note
1st place, gold medalist(s)	5	Kylian Portal (FRA)	57.84	
2nd place, silver medalist(s)	3	Dzmitry Salei (AIN)	57.87	
3rd place, bronze medalist(s)	4	Raman Salei (AZE)	58.17	
4	8	Douglas Matera (BRA)	58.75	
5	2	Juan Ferron Gutierrez (ESP)	59.59	
6	1	Maksim Vashkevich (AIN)	59.61	
7	7	Timofei Guk (AIN)	59.68	
8	6	Egor Kuzmin (AIN)	1:00.08	

=== S13 ===
The men's 100 m butterfly S13 event will be held on the morning and evening of 21 September.

The relevant records in the lead up to this event where as follows:

Record	Athlete	Time	Date	City	Country
World	Ihar Boki (BLR)	0:53.72	2021-05-16	Funchal	Portugal
Championship	Ihar Boki (BLR)	0:53.95	2019-09-14	London	United Kingdom
African	Charles Bouwer (RSA)	0:59.03	2012-08-31	London	United Kingdom
Americas	Douglas Matera (BRA)	0:57.81	2022-04-01	São Paulo	Brazil
Asian	Islam Aslanov (UZB)	0:55.99	2019-09-14	London	United Kingdom
European	Ihar Boki (BLR)	0:53.72	2021-05-16	Funchal	Portugal
Oceania	Timothy Antalfy (AUS)	0:54.92	2012-03-21	Adelaide	Australia

==== Heats ====
Thirteen swimmers will take part, with the top eight progressing to the final.

Rank	Heat	Lane	Athlete	Class	Result	Notes
1	1	1	Oleksii Virchenko (UKR)	S13	56.28	Q
2	1	2	Egor Shchitkovskii (AIN)	S13	56.43	Q
3	2	1	Alex Portal (FRA)	S13	57.21	Q
4	2	2	Vitalii Tsybriuk (AIN)	S13	57.28	Q
5	1	3	Evgenii Lazutin (AIN)	S13	58.28	Q
6	2	3	Enrique Mollar (ESP)	S13	58.44	Q
7	2	4	Nathan Hendricks (RSA)	S13	58.46	Q
8	1	4	Genki Saito (JPN)	S13	1:00.09	Q
9	2	5	Pedro Fernandez Garcia (ESP)	S13	1:01.34	
10	2	6	Gabriel Steen (NOR)	S13	1:01.34	
11	1	5	Philip Hebmueller (GER)	S13	1:01.55	
12	1	6	Bogdan Biktimirov (UZB)	S13	1:03.51	
13	2	7	Zhi Wei Wong (SGP)	S13	1:04.85	

==== Final ====
Rank	Lane	Athlete	Class	Result	Notes
1st place, gold medalist(s)	5	Egor Shchitkovskii (AIN)	S13	55.47	
2nd place, silver medalist(s)	4	Oleksii Virchenko (UKR)	S13	55.74	
3rd place, bronze medalist(s)	3	Alex Portal (FRA)	S13	56.51	
4	6	Vitalii Tsybriuk (AIN)	S13	56.56	
5	7	Enrique Mollar (ESP)	S13	56.66	
6	2	Evgenii Lazutin (AIN)	S13	57.98	
7	1	Nathan Hendricks (RSA)	S13	58.67	
8	8	Genki Saito (JPN)	S13	1:00.23	

=== S14 ===
The men's 100 m butterfly S14 event was held on the morning and evening of 27 September. Twenty swimmers took part, with the top eight progressing to the final.

The relevant records in the lead up to this event where as follows:

Record	Athlete	Time	Date	City	Country
World	Gabriel Bandeira (BRA)	0:54.18	2022-05-11	São Paulo	Brazil
Championship	Reece Dunn (GBR)	0:54.46	2019-09-15	London	United Kingdom
African	Record Mark (IPC)	0:59.38			
Americas	Gabriel Bandeira (BRA)	0:54.18	2022-05-11	São Paulo	Brazil
Asian	Dai Tokairin (JPN)	0:55.68	2021-03-07	Fuji	Japan
European	Alexander Hillhouse (DEN)	0:54.27	2025-05-03	Paris	France
Oceania	Benjamin Hance (AUS)	0:55.71	2024-08-29	Paris	France

==== Heats ====
Rank	Heat	Lane	Athlete	Class	Result	Notes
1	2	4	Gabriel Bandeira (BRA)	S14	55.92	Q
2	1	4	Alexander Hillhouse (DEN)	S14	56.02	Q
3	2	5	William Ellard (GBR)	S14	56.32	Q
4	1	6	Naohide Yamaguchi (JPN)	S14	56.69	Q
5	1	5	Benjamin Hance (AUS)	S14	56.74	Q
6	2	6	Arthur Xavier Ribeiro (BRA)	S14	56.97	Q
7	1	2	Anku Matsuda (JPN)	S14	57.60	Q
8	1	3	Declan Budd (AUS)	S14	57.66	Q
9	2	3	Rhys Darbey (GBR)	S14	57.72	
10	2	7	Shunya Murakami (JPN)	S14	57.89	
11	1	7	Robert Isak Jonsson (ISL)	S14	58.27	
12	2	8	Rodion Berdnik (AIN)	S14	58.56	
13	2	1	Mark Tompsett (GBR)	S14	58.76	
14	1	8	Ricky Betar (AUS)	S14	58.83	
15	1	1	Andrzej Kowalik (POL)	S14	59.22	
16	1	0	Tsun Lok Cheung (HKG)	S14	59.23	
17	2	0	Asher Smith-Franklin (NZL)	S14	59.32	
18	2		Ariel Alegarbes (PHI)	S14	59.96	
19	2		Nicholas Bennett (CAN)	S14	1:00.35	
20	1	9	Wei Siang Darren Chan (SGP)	S14	1:07.00	

==== Final ====
Rank	Lane	Athlete	Class	Result	Notes
1st place, gold medalist(s)	3	William Ellard (GBR)	S14	54.32	CR
2nd place, silver medalist(s)	4	Gabriel Bandeira (BRA)	S14	54.40	
3rd place, bronze medalist(s)	5	Alexander Hillhouse (DEN)	S14	54.86	
4	2	Benjamin Hance (AUS)	S14	55.20	OC
5	7	Arthur Xavier Ribeiro (BRA)	S14	56.05	
6	6	Naohide Yamaguchi (JPN)	S14	56.30	
7	1	Anku Matsuda (JPN)	S14	57.22	
8	8	Declan Budd (AUS)	S14	57.27	
