= 2025 World Para Swimming Championships – Men's 50 metre butterfly =

The men's 50 metre butterfly events at the 2025 World Para Swimming Championships were held at the Singapore Aquatic Centre between 21 and 27 September 2025. Three events will be held over this distance.

== Schedule ==
The 50 metre butterfly events for men will be held across the following schedule:

men's 50 metre butterfly
Day	Date	Classifications
Day 1	21 Sept	
Day 2	22 Sept	
Day 3	23 Sept	S5
Day 4	24 Sept	
Day 5	25 Sept	S7
Day 6	26 Sept	
Day 7	27 Sept	S6

== Medal summary ==
Event	Gold	Silver	Bronze
S5	Guo Jincheng; China	Samuel de Oliveira; Brazil	Yuan Weiyi; China
S6	Nelson Crispín; Colombia	Laurent Chardard; France	Vladyslav Koshman; Ukraine
S7	Andrii Trusov; Ukraine	Carlos Serrano Zárate; Colombia	Christian Sadie; South Africa

== Race summaries ==
=== S5 ===
The men's 50 metre butterfly S5 event will be held on 23 September. Twelve swimmers will take part, with the top eight progressing to the final.

The relevant records at the beginning of the event were as follows:

Record	Athlete	Time	Date	City	Country
World	Guo Jincheng (CHN)	0:30.28	2024-09-06	Paris	France
Championship	Samuel de Oliveira (BRA)	0:31.21	2023-08-02	Manchester	United Kingdom
African	Hani Abdelsalam (EGY)	0:42.59	2017-12-03	Mexico City	Mexico
Americas	Samuel de Oliveira (BRA)	0:31.21	2023-08-02	Manchester	United Kingdom
Asian	Guo Jincheng (CHN)	0:30.28	2024-09-06	Paris	France
European	Yaroslav Semenenko (UKR)	0:33.22	2019-09-12	London	United Kingdom
Oceania	Cameron Leslie (NZL)	0:43.11	2010-08-16	Eindhoven	Netherlands

==== Heats ====
Rank	Heat	Lane	Athlete	Time	Note
1	2	4	Guo Jincheng (CHN)	32.08	Q
2	2	5	Samuel de Oliveira (BRA)	32.43	Q
3	1	6	Artem Oliinyk (UKR)	34.36	Q
4	2	3	Tiago de Oliveria Rerreira (BRA)	34.50	Q
5	1	5	Eigo Tanaka (JPN)	34.61	Q
6	1	4	Yuan Weiyi (CHN)	34.99	Q
7	1	3	Kaede Hinata (JPN)	35.75	Q
8	2	2	Oleksandr Komarov (UKR)	36.14	Q
9	1	7	Kirill Pulver (AIN)	36.24	R
10	2	6	Sebastian Massabie (CAN)	36.27	R
11	1	2	Koral Berkin Kutlu (TUR)	36.45	
12	2	7	Ismail Zulfic (BIH)	37.14	

==== Final ====
Rank	Lane	Athlete	Time	Note
1st place, gold medalist(s)	4	Guo Jincheng (CHN)	31.28	
2nd place, silver medalist(s)	5	Samuel de Oliveira (BRA)	31.98	
3rd place, bronze medalist(s)	7	Yuan Weiyi (CHN)	32.12	
4	2	Eigo Tanaka (JPN)	33.38	
5	6	Tiago de Oliveria Rerreira (BRA)	33.88	
6	3	Artem Oliinyk (UKR)	34.16	
7	1	Kaede Hinata (JPN)	35.78	
8	8	Oleksandr Komarov (UKR)	36.83	

=== S6 ===
The men's 50 metre butterfly S6 event was held on 27 September. Fifteen swimmers took part, with the top eight progressing to the final. The relevant records at the beginning of the event were as follows:

Record	Athlete	Time	Date	City	Country
World	Xu Qing (CHN)	0:29.89	2016-09-09	Rio de Janeiro	Brazil
Championship	Zheng Tao (CHN)	0:29.95	2013-08-17	Montreal	Canada
African	Kabelo Zwane (RSA)	0:35.37	2019-04-26	Glasgow	United Kingdom
Americas	Nelson Crispín (COL)	0:30.82	2017-12-06	Mexico City	Mexico
Asian	Xu Qing (CHN)	0:29.89	2016-09-09	Rio de Janeiro	Brazil
European	Laurent Chardard (FRA)	0:31.03	2023-08-06	Manchester	United Kingdom
Oceania	Matthew Haanappel (AUS)	0:33.81	2014-08-06	Pasadena	United States

==== Heats ====
Rank	Heat	Lane	Athlete	Class	Result	Notes
1	2	4	Nelson Crispín (COL)	S6	31.89	Q
2	1	5	Vladyslav Koshman (UKR)	S6	32.48	Q
3	1	4	Laurent Chardard (FRA)	S6	32.56	Q
4	1	6	Santiago León (COL)	S6	32.81	Q
5	2	3	Yang Hong (CHN)	S6	33.01	Q
6	2	2	Luo Yanbo (CHN)	S6	33.12	Q
7	2	5	Gabriel Meloni (BRA)	S6	33.29	Q
8	1	2	Bruce Dee (GBR)	S6	33.45	Q
9	2	7	Aekkarin Noithat (THA)	S6	33.48	
10	1	3	David Sanchez Sierra (ESP)	S6	34.02	
11	1	1	Gary Bejino (PHI)	S6	34.21	
12	2	1	Jesus Alberto Gutierrez (MEX)	S6	34.67	
13	1	7	Zach Shattuck (USA)	S6	36.06	
14	2	8	Josué Rodrigo (ESA)	S6	36.38	
	2	6	Yerzhan Salimgereyev (KAZ)	S6		DNS

==== Final ====
Rank	Lane	Athlete	Class	Result	Notes
1st place, gold medalist(s)	4	Nelson Crispín (COL)	S6	31.39	
2nd place, silver medalist(s)	3	Laurent Chardard (FRA)	S6	31.95	
3rd place, bronze medalist(s)	5	Vladyslav Koshman (UKR)	S6	31.96	
4	7	Luo Yanbo (CHN)	S6	32.68	
5	6	Santiago León (COL)	S6	32.71	
6	2	Yang Hong (CHN)	S6	32.84	
7	1	Gabriel Meloni (BRA)	S6	33.26	
8	8	Bruce Dee (GBR)	S6	33.74	

=== S7 ===
The men's 50 metre butterfly S7 event will be held on 25 September. Eleven swimmers will take part, with the top eight progressing to the final. The relevant records at the beginning of the event were as follows:

Record	Athlete	Time	Date	City	Country
World	Pan Shiyun (CHN)	0:28.41	2016-09-12	Rio de Janeiro	Brazil
Championship	Andrii Trusov (UKR)	0:28.92	2023-08-04	Manchester	United Kingdom
African	Christian Sadie (RSA)	0:29.94	2024-04-25	Funchal	Portugal
Americas	Evan Austin (USA)	0:28.98	2021-09-03	Tokyo	Japan
Asian	Pan Shiyun (CHN)	0:28.41	2016-09-12	Rio de Janeiro	Brazil
European	Andrii Trusov (UKR)	0:28.75	2024-09-07	Paris	France
Oceania	Matthew Levy (AUS)	0:31.32	2016-09-12	Rio de Janeiro	Brazil

==== Heats ====
Rank	Heat	Lane	Athlete	Class	Result	Notes
1	1	4	Carlos Serrano Zárate (COL)	S7	30.01	Q
2	2	4	Andrii Trusov (UKR)	S7	30.03	Q
3	1	5	Christian Sadie (RSA)	S7	30.32	Q
4	1	3	Sardor Bakhtiyorov (UZB)	S7	31.84	Q
5	2	3	Wei Soong Toh (SGP)	S7	32.46	Q
6	2	6	Huang Xianquan (CHN)	S7	32.91	Q
7	1	2	Federico Bicelli (ITA)	S7	34.31	Q
8	1	6	Jurijs Semjonovs (LAT)	S7	34.65	Q
9	2	2	Adin Williams (USA)	S7	34.71	
10	2	7	Zaur Mushkudiani (GEO)	S7	41.80	
	2	5	Egor Efrosinin (AIN)	S7		DSQ

==== Final ====
Rank	Lane	Athlete	Class	Result	Notes
1st place, gold medalist(s)	5	Andrii Trusov (UKR)	S7	28.95	
2nd place, silver medalist(s)	4	Carlos Serrano Zárate (COL)	S7	29.36	
3rd place, bronze medalist(s)	3	Christian Sadie (RSA)	S7	30.11	
4	6	Sardor Bakhtiyorov (UZB)	S7	31.46	
5	2	Wei Soong Toh (SGP)	S7	31.60	
6	7	Huang Xianquan (CHN)	S7	31.89	
7	1	Federico Bicelli (ITA)	S7	34.42	
	8	Jurijs Semjonovs (LAT)	S7		DSQ
