= 2025 World Para Swimming Championships – Men's 200 metre freestyle =

The men's 200 metre freestyle events at the 2025 World Para Swimming Championships were held at the Singapore Aquatic Centre between 21 and 27 September 2025. Six classifications will compete in the event.

== Schedule ==
The 200 metre freestyle events for men will be held across the following schedule:

men's 200 metre freestyle
Day	Date	Classifications
Day 1	21 Sept	S14
Day 2	22 Sept	
Day 3	23 Sept	
Day 4	24 Sept	S1, S2
Day 5	25 Sept	
Day 6	26 Sept	S3; S5
Day 7	27 Sept	S4

== Medal summary ==
Event	Gold	Silver	Bronze
S1; Details	Anton Kol; Ukraine	Iyad Shalabi; Israel	Francesco Bettella; Italy
S2; Details	Gabriel Araújo; Brazil	Vladimir Danilenko; Individual Neutral Athletes	Alberto Abarza; Chile
S3; Details	Gabriele Lorenzo; Italy	Denys Ostapchenko; Ukraine	Umut Ünlü; Turkey
S4; Details	Ami Omer Dadaon; Israel	Federico Cristiani; Italy	Roman Zhdanov; Individual Neutral Athletes
S5; Details	Artem Oliinyk; Ukraine	Francesco Bocciardo; Italy	Kirill Pulver; Individual Neutral Athletes
S14; Details	William Ellard; Great Britain	Gabriel Bandeira; Brazil	Nicholas Bennett; Canada

== Race summaries ==
=== S1 ===
The Men's 200 metre freestyle S1 event will be held on the evening of the 24 September.

The relevant records at the beginning of the event were as follows:

Record	Athlete	Time	Date	City	Country
World	Kamil Otowski (POL)	4:39.31	2023-11-18	Szczecin	Poland
Championship	Anton Kol (UKR)	4:57.31	2023-08-03	Manchester	United Kingdom
Americas	José Ronaldo da Silva (BRA)	5:58.66	2022-04-08	São Paulo	Brazil
Asian	Alireza Jalili (IRI)	6:58.84	2018-10-09	Jakarta	Indonesia
European	Kamil Otowski (POL)	4:39.31	2023-11-18	Szczecin	Poland

==== Final ====
Six swimmers, representing six nations, took part in a direct final.

Rank	Lane	Athlete	Class	Result	Notes
1st place, gold medalist(s)	3	Anton Kol (UKR)	S1	5:15.69	
2nd place, silver medalist(s)	4	Iyad Shalabi (ISR)	S1	5:26.65	
3rd place, bronze medalist(s)	5	Francesco Bettella (ITA)	S1	5:34.51	
4	6	José Ronaldo da Silva (BRA)	S1	6:30.60	
5	2	Dimitrios Karypidis (GRE)	S1	6:40.09	
6	7	Miguel Navarro (ESP)	S1	7:46.13	

=== S2 ===
The men's 200 metre freestyle S2 event was held on 24 September.

The relevant records at the beginning of the event were as follows:

Record	Athlete	Time	Date	City	Country
World	Liu Benying (CHN)	3:41.54	2016-09-11	Rio de Janeiro	Brazil
Championship	Gabriel Araújo (BRA)	3:59.06	2022-06-15	Funchal	Portugal
Americas	Gabriel Araújo (BRA)	3:58.92	2024-09-02	Paris	France
Asian	Liu Benying (CHN)	3:41.54	2016-09-11	Rio de Janeiro	Brazil
European	Serhii Palamarchuk (UKR)	3:43.69	2016-09-11	Rio de Janeiro	Brazil

==== Final. ====
Seven swimmers took part in a direct final.

Rank	Lane	Athlete	Time	Note
1st place, gold medalist(s)	4	Gabriel Araújo (BRA)	3:58.45	
2nd place, silver medalist(s)	5	Vladimir Danilenko (AIN)	4:07.30	
3rd place, bronze medalist(s)	3	Alberto Abarza (CHI)	4:16.61	
4	6	Bruno Becker (BRA)	4:27.49	
5	7	Rodrigo Santillan (PER)	4:41.50	
6	1	Jesus Lopez Cervantes (MEX)	5:18.17	
7	8	Conrad Hildebrand (SWE)	5:53.64	

=== S3 ===
The men's 200 metre freestyle S3 event will be held on 24 September. Fourteen swimmers took part, with the top eight progressing to the final.

The relevant records at the beginning of the event were as follows:

Record	Athlete	Time	Date	City	Country
World	Huang Wenpan (CHN)	3:09.04	2016-09-15	Rio de Janeiro	Brazil
Championship	Huang Wenpan (CHN)	3:17.77	2017-12-04	Mexico City	Mexico
African	Youssef Elsayed (EGY)	4:39.46	2023-11-10	Cairo	Egypt
Americas	Diego Lopez Diaz (MEX)	3:15.65	2018-06-07	Berlin	Germany
Asian	Huang Wenpan (CHN)	3:09.04	2016-09-15	Rio de Janeiro	Brazil
European	Dmytro Vynohradets' (UKR)	3:09.77	2016-09-15	Rio de Janeiro	Brazil
Oceania	Grant Patterson (AUS)	3:55.93	2015-07-13	Glasgow	United Kingdom

==== Heats ====
Rank	Heat	Lane	Athlete	Time	Note
1	2	5	Denys Ostapchenko (UKR)	3:23.24	Q
2	2	4	Gabriele Lorenzo (ITA)	3:25.57	Q
3	1	4	Umut Unlu (TUR)	3:29.73	Q
4	1	5	Serhii Palamarchuk (UKR)	3:37.58	Q
5	2	3	Diego Lopez Diaz (MEX)	3:44.49	Q
6	2	6	Vincenzo Boni (ITA)	3:45.33	Q
7	1	3	Josia Topf (GER)	3:46.40	Q
8	2	2	Isaias Sono (PER)	3:48.42	Q
9	1	6	Krzysztof Lechniak (POL)	3:55.74	R
10	2	7	Grant Patterson (AUS)	3:59.19	R
11	1	7	Marco Tinamisan (PHI)	3:59.59	R
12	1	2	Emmanuele Marigliano (ITA)	4:07.17	
13	1	1	Patricio Larenas (CHI)	4:26.31	

==== Final ====
Rank	Lane	Athlete	Time	Note
1st place, gold medalist(s)	5	Gabriele Lorenzo (ITA)	3:15.12	CR
2nd place, silver medalist(s)	4	Denys Ostapchenko (UKR)	3:21.69	
3rd place, bronze medalist(s)	6	Umut Unlu (TUR)	3:26.11	
4	3	Serhii Palamarchuk (UKR)	3:36.39	
5	1	Josia Topf (GER)	3:37.11	
6	7	Vincenzo Boni (ITA)	3:44.64	
7	2	Diego Lopez Diaz (MEX)	3:45.52	
8	8	Isaias Sono (PER)	3:47.63	

=== S4 ===
The men's 200 metre freestyle S4 event will be held on 27 September. Eight swimmers will take part in a direct final.

The relevant records at the beginning of the event were as follows:

Record	Athlete	Time	Date	City	Country
World	Ami Omer Dadaon (ISR)	2:44.84	2021-08-30	Tokyo	Japan
Championship	Ami Omer Dadaon (ISR)	2:50.91	2022-06-18	Funchal	Portugal
Americas	Ángel Camacho (MEX)	2:55.20	2024-09-03	Paris	France
Asian	Takayuki Suzuki (JPN)	2:53.22	2019-09-14	London	United Kingdom
European	Ami Omer Dadaon (ISR)	2:44.84	2021-08-30	Tokyo	Japan
Oceania	Cameron Leslie (NZL)	2:59.71	2022-06-18	Funchal	Portugal

==== Final ====
Eight swimmers competed in the straight final.

Rank	Lane	Athlete	Time	Note
1st place, gold medalist(s)	4	Ami Omer Dadaon (ISR)	2:44.91	CR
2nd place, silver medalist(s)	5	Federico Cristiani (ITA)	2:50.92	
3rd place, bronze medalist(s)	3	Roman Zhdanov (AIN)	2:55.01	
4	6	Ángel Camacho (MEX)	2:58.38	
5	2	Luigi Beggiato (ITA)	3:05.28	
6	1	Dimitri Granjux (FRA)	3:16.94	
7	7	G Sanchez Martinez (MEX)	3:19.43	
8	8	Andreas Ernhofer (AUT)	3:23.41	

=== S5 ===
The men's 200 metre freestyle S5 event will be held on 26 September.

The relevant records at the beginning of the event were as follows:

Record	Athlete	Time	Date	City	Country
World	Francesco Bocciardo (ITA)	2:23.65	2018-08-13	Dublin	Ireland
Championship	Francesco Bocciardo (ITA)	2:24.11	2019-09-10	London	United Kingdom
African	Zeyad Kahil (EGY)	2:52.12	2024-08-29	Paris	France
Americas	Daniel Dias (BRA)	2:26.51	2010-08-19	Eindhoven	Netherlands
Asian	Guo Jincheng (CHN)	2:40.74	2024-08-29	Paris	France
European	Francesco Bocciardo (ITA)	2:23.65	2018-08-13	Dublin	Ireland
Oceania	Cameron Leslie (NZL)	2:52.10	2016-09-08	Rio de Janeiro	Brazil

==== Heats ====
Fourteen swimmers took part, with the top eight progressing to the final.

Rank	Heat	Lane	Athlete	Time	Note
1	1	4	Kirill Pulver (AIN)	2:30.35	Q
2	2	4	Francesco Bocciardo (ITA)	2:33.16	Q
3	1	5	Antoni Ponce Bertran (ESP)	2:37.07	Q
4	2	3	Noam Katav (ISR)	2:39.91	Q
5	2	6	Artem Oliinyk (UKR)	2:40.92	Q
6	1	6	Luis Huerta Poza (ESP)	2:46.48	Q
7	2	2	Koral Berkin Kutlu (TUR)	2:47.53	Q
8	2	5	Oleksandr Komarov (UKR)	2:48.88	Q
9	1	3	Guo Jincheng (CHN)	2:52.33	R
10	2	7	M Zulkafli (MAS)	2:55.54	R
11	2	1	Hubert Podgorski (POL)	2:55.76	R
12	1	2	Zeyad Kahil (EGY)	2:57.65	
13	1	7	Phuchit Aingchaiyaphum (THA)	2:58.81	
14	1	1	Sebastian Massabie (CAN)	2:58.96	

==== Final ====
Rank	Lane	Athlete	Time	Note
1st place, gold medalist(s)	2	Artem Oliinyk (UKR)	2:23.78	CR
2nd place, silver medalist(s)	5	Francesco Bocciardo (ITA)	2:27.56	
3rd place, bronze medalist(s)	4	Kirill Pulver (AIN)	2:29.32	
4	6	Antoni Ponce Bertran (ESP)	2:33.85	
5	8	Oleksandr Komarov (UKR)	2:34.49	
6	3	Noam Katav (ISR)	2:39.08	
7	1	Koral Berkin Kutlu (TUR)	2:43.77	
8	7	Luis Huerta Poza (ESP)	2:44.98	

=== S14 ===
The men's 200 metre freestyle S14 event were held on 21 September.

The relevant records at the beginning of the event were as follows:

Record	Athlete	Time	Date	City	Country
World	William Ellard (GBR)	1:51.30	2024-08-31	Paris	France
Championship	Gabriel Bandeira (BRA)	1:52.42	2022-06-12	Funchal	Portugal
African	Record Mark (IPC)	-			
Americas	Gabriel Bandeira (BRA)	1:52.42	2022-06-12	Funchal	Portugal
Asian	Wai Lok Tang (HKG)	1:56.32	2016-09-11	Rio de Janeiro	Brazil
European	William Ellard (GBR)	1:51.30	2024-08-31	Paris	France
Oceania	Jack Ireland (AUS)	1:53.77	2024-08-31	Paris	France

==== Heats ====
Eleven swimmers took part, with the top eight progressing to the final.

Rank	Heat	Lane	Athlete	Time	Note
1	2	4	William Ellard (GBR)	1:54.11	Q
2	2	5	Jack Ireland (AUS)	1:55.17	Q
3	2	6	Gabriel Bandeira (BRA)	1:56.06	Q
4	1	4	Nicholas Bennett (CAN)	1:56.07	Q
5	1	5	Declan Budd (AUS)	1:57.39	Q
6	2	3	Rodion Berdnik (AIN)	1:58.13	Q
7	1	6	Tsun Lok Cheung (HKG)	1:58.67	Q
8	1	2	Nader Khalili (FIN)	1:59.65	Q
9	1	3	Dylan Broom (GBR)	2:00.11	R
10	2	7	Darren Chan Wei Sang (SGP)	2:19.96	R

==== Final ====
Rank	Lane	Athlete	Time	Note
1st place, gold medalist(s)	4	William Ellard (GBR)	1:51.08	WR
2nd place, silver medalist(s)	6	Gabriel Bandeira (BRA)	1:52.03	
3rd place, bronze medalist(s)	3	Nicholas Bennett (CAN)	1:53.97	
4	5	Jack Ireland (AUS)	1:54.30	
5	2	Rodion Berdnik (AIN)	1:55.14	
6	7	Declan Budd (AUS)	1:56.64	
7	1	Tsun Lok Cheung (HKG)	1:58.80	
8	8	Nader Khalili (FIN)	1:59.99	
