= Callum Simpson =

Australian Paralympic swimmer

Callum Simpson OAM
Personal information
- Born: 11 April 2007 (age 19)

Sport
- Country: Australia
- Sport: Paralympic swimming
- Disability class: S8
- Event: s8 100 free
- Club: Flinders Phoenix SC
- Coached by: Chris Wright

Achievements and titles
- National finals: 1st in 100free
- Highest world ranking: 1st in 100 free
Medal record
Men's para swimming
Representing Australia
Paralympic Games
Gold medal – first place	2024 Paris	100 m freestyle S8
Gold medal – first place	2024 Paris	Mixed 4×100 m medley relay 34pts
Silver medal – second place	2024 Paris	Mixed 4×100 m freestyle relay 34pts
World Championships
Gold medal – first place	2025 Singapore	100 m freestyle S8
Gold medal – first place	2025 Singapore	200 m ind. medley SM8
Gold medal – first place	2025 Singapore	Mixed 4×100 m freestyle relay 34 pts
Silver medal – second place	2025 Singapore	50 m freestyle S8
Bronze medal – third place	2025 Singapore	400 m freestyle S8

Callum Simpson OAM (born 11 April 2007) is an Australian Paralympic swimmer. At the 2024 Paris Paralympics, he won two gold and one silver medal. At the 2025 World Para Swimming Championships, he won three gold, one silver and one bronze medals.

== Personal life ==
Simpson was born with microdeletion syndrome – a chromosomal abnormality and genetic disorder which causes learning delay and physical flow-on effects – which causes his left and right side not to work in unison. He also has dyspraxia, neurological disorders, and cerebral palsy. Simpson attends Matthew Flinders Anglican College, Buderim, Queensland. His parents are Bec and Nigel Simpson, who represented and captained the England rugby sevens team for many years. Callum has a brother Henry, who is a talented water polo player, and is representing Australia in the surf life saving World Championships in 2024. Callum is of Rotuman heritage from his paternal side which makes him the second Rotuman swimmer to medal at an Olympic Games event after Greg Fasala.

== Swimming ==
Simpson was encouraged to take up swimming to strengthen his body and as part of his weekly therapy. Olympian and swim coach Janelle Pallister played an important role in his early swimming development. After strong performances at national swimming championships, he was selected as a member of The Para Flippers Development Squad for 2023. He was selected on the Australian Swim Para Team to compete at Para Swimming European Open Championships in Madeira, Portugal in 2024.

At the 2024 Paris Paralympics, Simpson won gold medals in the Men's 100 m freestyle S8 and Mixed 4 × 100 m medley 34 pts (heat) and silver medal in the Mixed 4 × 100 m freestyle 34 pts.

At the 2025 World Para Swimming Championships in Singapore, he won three gold medals - Men's 100m Freestyle S8, Men's 200 m Individual Medley SM8 and Mixed 4 × 100 m Freestyle 34pts, the silver medal in Men's 50m Freestyle S8 and the bronze medal in Men's 400 m Freestyle S8.

He is an active member of the Alexandra Headland Surf Lifesaving Club.

He is coached by Olympic swimmer Chris Wright at the Flinders Aquatic Academy in Buderim, Queensland.

== Recognition ==
- 2018 - School Sport Australia Sportsmanship Award for Swimming.
- 2024 - Sport Australia Hall of Fame Scholarship and Mentoring Program Tier 2 Scholarship.
- 2024 - Australian Institute of Sport Discovery of the Year.
- 2024 - Commonwealth Games Australia’s Emerging Athlete of the Month for August.
- 2025 - Medal of the Order of Australia (OAM) for service to sport as a gold medallist at the Paris Paralympic Games 2024.
- 2025 - Swimming Australia Paralympic Program Swimmer of the Year
- 2025 - Queensland Para-athlete of the Year
