= Ihor Nimchenko =

Ukrainian Paralympic swimmer

Personal information
- Native name: Donbas bullet
- Nationality: Ukrainian
- Born: 15 April 1998 (age 28)

Sport
- Sport: Para swimming
- Disability class: S10
Medal record
Para swimming
Representing Ukraine
Paralympic Games
Silver medal – second place	2024 Paris	100 m butterfly S10
Bronze medal – third place	2024 Paris	200 m medley SM10
World Championships
Silver medal – second place	2023 Manchester	100 m butterfly S10
Silver medal – second place	2025 Singapore	100 m butterfly S10
Bronze medal – third place	2023 Manchester	100 m backstroke S10
Bronze medal – third place	2025 Singapore	50 m freestyle S10
Bronze medal – third place	2025 Singapore	100 m freestyle S10
Bronze medal – third place	2025 Singapore	200 m medley SM10
European Championships
Gold medal – first place	2024 Madeira	50 m freestyle S10
Gold medal – first place	2026 Kocaeli	50 m freestyle S10
Silver medal – second place	2024 Madeira	100 m freestyle S10
Silver medal – second place	2024 Madeira	100 m butterfly S10
Silver medal – second place	2026 Kocaeli	200 m ind. medley SM10
Silver medal – second place	2026 Kocaeli	100 m freestyle S10

Ihor Nimchenko (born 15 April 1998) is a Ukrainian para swimmer. He represented Ukraine at the 2024 Summer Paralympics.

== Career ==
Nimchenko represented Ukraine at the 2023 World Para Swimming Championships and won a silver medal in the 100 metre butterfly S10 and a bronze medal in the 100 metre backstroke S10 events.

Nimchenko represented Ukraine at the 2024 Summer Paralympics and won a silver medal in the 100 m butterfly S10 event.
