= Mahamadou Dambelleh Jarra =

Spanish para swimmer

Personal information
- Nationality: Spanish

Sport
- Sport: Para swimming
- Disability class: S11, SB11
Medal record
Men's para swimming
Representing Spain
World Championships
Silver medal – second place	2025 Singapore	50 m freestyle S11

Mahamadou Dambelleh Jarra is a Spanish para swimmer.

== Career ==
Dambelleh made his World Para Swimming Championships debut in 2023. In September 2025, he competed at the 2025 World Para Swimming Championships and won a silver medal in the 50 metre freestyle S11 event with a time of 25.88, finishing 0.36 seconds behind gold medalist David Kratochvíl.

== Personal life ==
Dambelleh is blind.
