= Li Ting (swimmer) =

Chinese para swimmer (born 2001)

Personal information
- Nationality: Chinese
- Born: 28 June 2001 (age 25)

Sport
- Sport: Para swimming
- Disability class: S8, SB8
Medal record
Men's para swimming
Representing China
World Championships
Gold medal – first place	2025 Singapore	100 m butterfly S8

Li Ting (born 28 June 2001) is a Chinese para swimmer. He represented China at the 2024 Summer Paralympics.

== Career ==
Li represented China at the 2024 Summer Paralympics. His best finish was fourth place in the 100 metre butterfly S8 event. In September 2025, he competed at the 2025 World Para Swimming Championships and won a gold medal in the 100 metre butterfly S8 event.
