= Oliwier Krzyszkowski =

Polish para swimmer

Personal information
- Nationality: Polish

Sport
- Sport: Para swimming
- Disability: Cerebral palsy
- Disability class: S9
- Club: Omega Kleszczów
- Coached by: Robert Pawlicki
Medal record
Men's para swimming
Representing Poland
World Championships
Silver medal – second place	2025 Singapore	50 m freestyle S9
European Championships
Silver medal – second place	2026 Kocaeli	50 m freestyle S9

Oliwier Krzyszkowski is a Polish para swimmer.

== Career ==
Krzyszkowski competed at the 2025 World Para Swimming Championships and won a silver medal in the 50 metre freestyle S9 event. He also competed in the 100 metre freestyle S9 event, and finished in fourth place.

== Personal life ==
Krzyszkowski was born with cerebral palsy.
