= Egor Shchitkovskii =

Russian para swimmer (born 2007)

Personal information
- Native name: Егор Щитковский
- Nationality: Russian

Sport
- Sport: Para swimming
- Disability class: S13
Medal record
Men's para swimming
Representing Neutral Paralympic Athletes
World Championships
Gold medal – first place	2025 Singapore	100 m butterfly S13
Gold medal – first place	2025 Singapore	100 m freestyle S13
Gold medal – first place	2025 Singapore	400 m freestyle S13
Gold medal – first place	2025 Singapore	200 m medley SM13
Bronze medal – third place	2025 Singapore	50 m freestyle S13
Representing Russia
European Championships
Gold medal – first place	2026 Kocaeli	400 m freestyle S13
Bronze medal – third place	2026 Kocaeli	100 m butterfly S13

Egor Shchitkovskii (Russian: Егор Щитковский) is a Russian para swimmer.

== Career ==
Shchitkovskii competed at the 2025 World Para Swimming Championships and won a gold medal in the 100 metre butterfly S13 event.
