= Lewis Bishop =

Australian Paralympic swimmer

Personal information
- Born: 9 May 2005 (age 21)

Sport
- Country: Australia
- Sport: Paralympic swimming
- Disability class: S9
- Club: Rackley East Brisbane SC
- Coached by: Josh Smith
Medal record
Men's para-swimming
Representing Australia
Paralympic Games
Bronze medal – third place	2024 Paris	100 m butterfly S9
World Championships
Bronze medal – third place	2025 Singapore	100 m butterfly S9

Lewis Bishop (born 9 May 2005) is an Australian amputee Paralympic swimmer. He competed at the 2024 Paris Paralympics, where he won a bronze medal.

== Personal life ==
At the age of nine, Bishop lost a leg when it was damaged by a propeller whilst kneeboarding in Papua New Guinea. Lewis has 4 siblings and parents who have always encouraged his involvement with swimming from an early age. He attended Clairvaux MacKillop College, Brisbane, Queensland. In 2024, he is studying exercise physiology at the Queensland University of Technology.

== Swimming ==
Before his accident, he was in swimming squad whilst living in Papua New Guinea. Whilst recovering in hospital, Australian amputee Paralympic swimmer Brenden Hall visited him. Scott Reardon, an amputee Australian Paralympic track runner also visited him. Bishop swims in S9, SB8, and SM9 events.

After strong performances at national swimming championships, he was selected as a member of The Para Flippers Development Squad for 2023. He was selected on the Australian Swim Para Team to compete at Para Swimming European Open Championships in Madeira, Portugal in 2024.

At the 2024 Paris Paralympics, he won the bronze medal in the Men's 100 m butterfly S9. At the 2025 World Para Swimming Championships in Singapore, he won the bronze medal in Men's 100 Butterfly S9.

He is coached by Josh Smith at Rackley East Brisbane SC in Brisbane.
