= Vladyslav Koshman =

Ukrainian para swimmer

Personal information
- Nationality: Ukrainian

Sport
- Sport: Para swimming
- Disability class: S6
Medal record
Men's para swimming
Representing Ukraine
World Championships
Silver medal – second place	2025 Singapore	50 m freestyle S6
Silver medal – second place	2025 Singapore	100 m freestyle S6
Bronze medal – third place	2025 Singapore	50 m butterfly S6
European Championships
Silver medal – second place	2026 Kocaeli	100 m freestyle S6
Silver medal – second place	2026 Kocaeli	200 m ind. medley SM6

Vladyslav Koshman is a Ukrainian para swimmer who competes in the S6 classification.

== Career ==
Koshman competed at the 2025 World Para Swimming Championships. He won his first medal by winning a silver medal in the 100 metre freestyle S6 event, finishing behind Antonio Fantin and Nelson Crispín, the latter in whom also shared the silver medal. He then won the silver medal in the 50 m freestyle and the bronze medal in the 50 m butterfly.
