= Gabriele Lorenzo =

Italian para swimmer (born 10/01/2006)

Personal information
- Nationality: Italian

Sport
- Sport: Para swimming
- Disability class: S3, SM3
Medal record
Men's para swimming
Representing Italy
World Championships
Gold medal – first place	2025 Singapore	100 m freestyle S3
Gold medal – first place	2025 Singapore	200 m freestyle S3
Silver medal – second place	2025 Singapore	50 m freestyle S3
Bronze medal – third place	2025 Singapore	150 m ind. medley SM3

Gabriele Lorenzo is an Italian para swimmer.

== Career ==
Lorenzo competed at the 2025 World Para Swimming Championships and won gold medals in the 100 metre freestyle S3 event with a championship record time of 1:33.25 and in the 200 metre freestyle S3 with a championship record time of 3:15.12. He also won a silver medal in the 50 metre freestyle S3 event with a time of 43.49 and a bronze medal in the 150 metre individual medley SM3 event with a time of 3:09.05.
