= Halže =

- Municipality
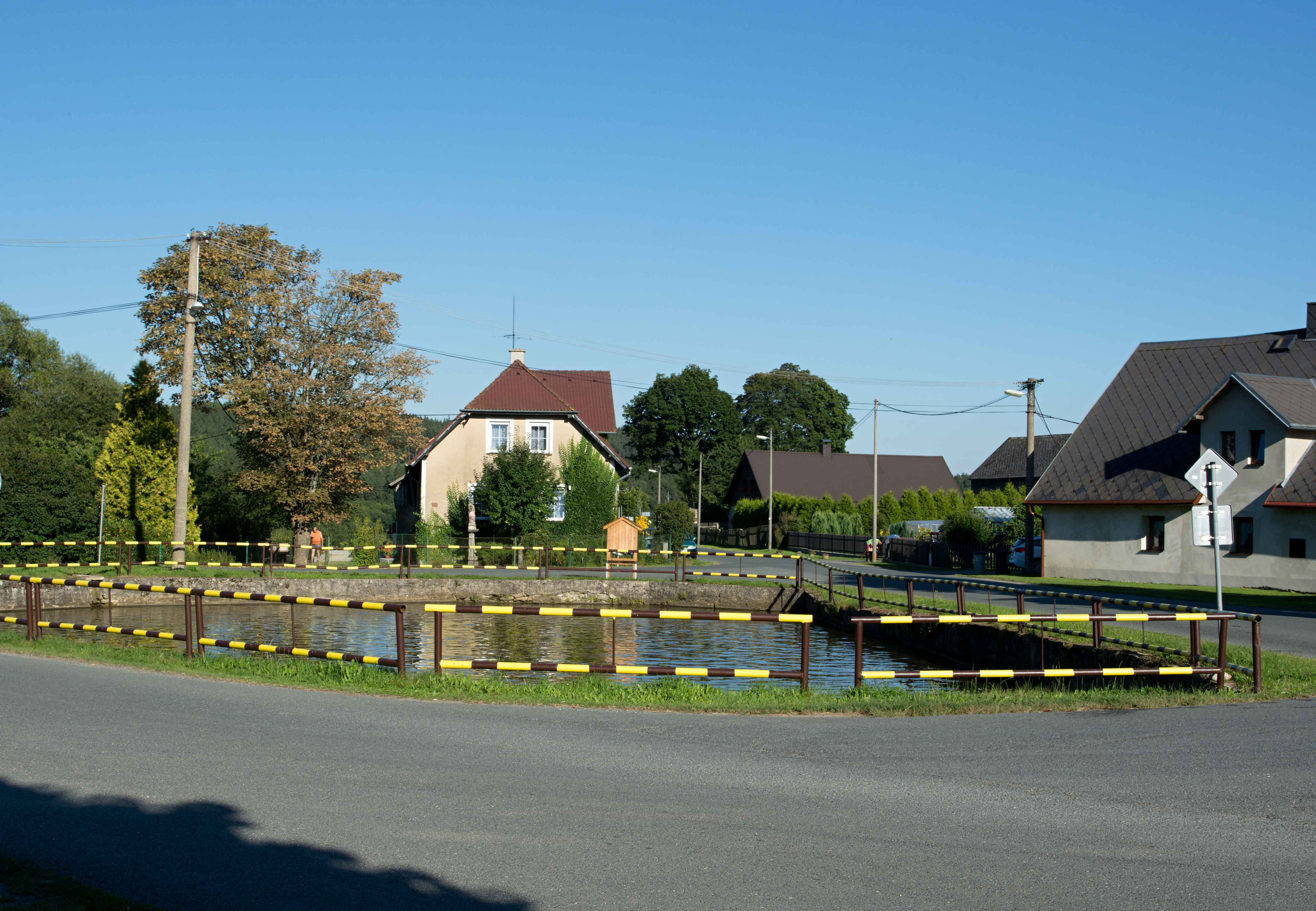
- Svobodka, a part of Halže

- Flag Coat of arms

- Location in the Czech Republic
- Coordinates: 49°50′4″N 12°34′36″E
- Country: Czech Republic
- Region: Plzeň
- District: Tachov
- First mentioned: 1479

Area
  - Total: 35.55 km^{2} (13.73 sq mi)
- Elevation: 596 m (1,955 ft)

Population (2026-01-01)
  - Total: 1,092
  - Density: 30.72/km^{2} (79.56/sq mi)
- Time zone: UTC+1 (CET)
  - Summer (DST): UTC+2 (CEST)
- Postal code: 347 01
- Website: halze.cz

Halže (German: Hals) is a municipality and village in Tachov District in the Plzeň Region of the Czech Republic. It has about 1,100 inhabitants.

== Administrative division ==
Halže consists of four municipal parts (in brackets population according to the 2021 census):

- Halže (734)
- Branka (61)
- Horní Výšina (30)
- Svobodka (107)

== Etymology ==
The original German name Hals means 'neck' or 'throat'. The name referred to the location of the village on a long, narrow elevated place between the mountains. The Czech name was derived from the German one.

== Geography ==
Halže is located about 5 kilometres (3 mi) northwest of Tachov and 56 km (35 mi) northwest of Plzeň. The municipality lies on the border with Germany and is adjacent to German municipalities of Bärnau and Mähring. It lies in the Upper Palatine Forest mountain range. The highest point is at 766 m (2,513 ft) above sea level. The Mže River flows through the municipality. The Lučina Reservoir is located on the southern municipal border.

== History ==
The first written mention of Halže is from 1479. It was a part of the Tachov estate until 1644, when the village was donated to the newly established monastery in Světce. Halže was owned by the monastery until 1787, when the monastery was abolished, and then it became a separate estate. It the 1880s, it was acquired by the Landwehr of Wehrheim family, who owned it until 1945.

In 1945, most German-speaking inhabitants, which made majority of the population in Halže, were expelled. After the war, the municipality was only partly repopulated.

== Demographics ==
Historical population

Year	Pop.	±%
1869	2,863	—
1880	2,394	−16.4%
1890	2,427	+1.4%
1900	2,479	+2.1%
1910	2,530	+2.1%

Year	Pop.	±%
1921	2,404	−5.0%
1930	2,344	−2.5%
1950	636	−72.9%
1961	543	−14.6%
1970	621	+14.4%

Year	Pop.	±%
1980	674	+8.5%
1991	779	+15.6%
2001	899	+15.4%
2011	916	+1.9%
2021	932	+1.7%

Source: Censuses

== Transport ==
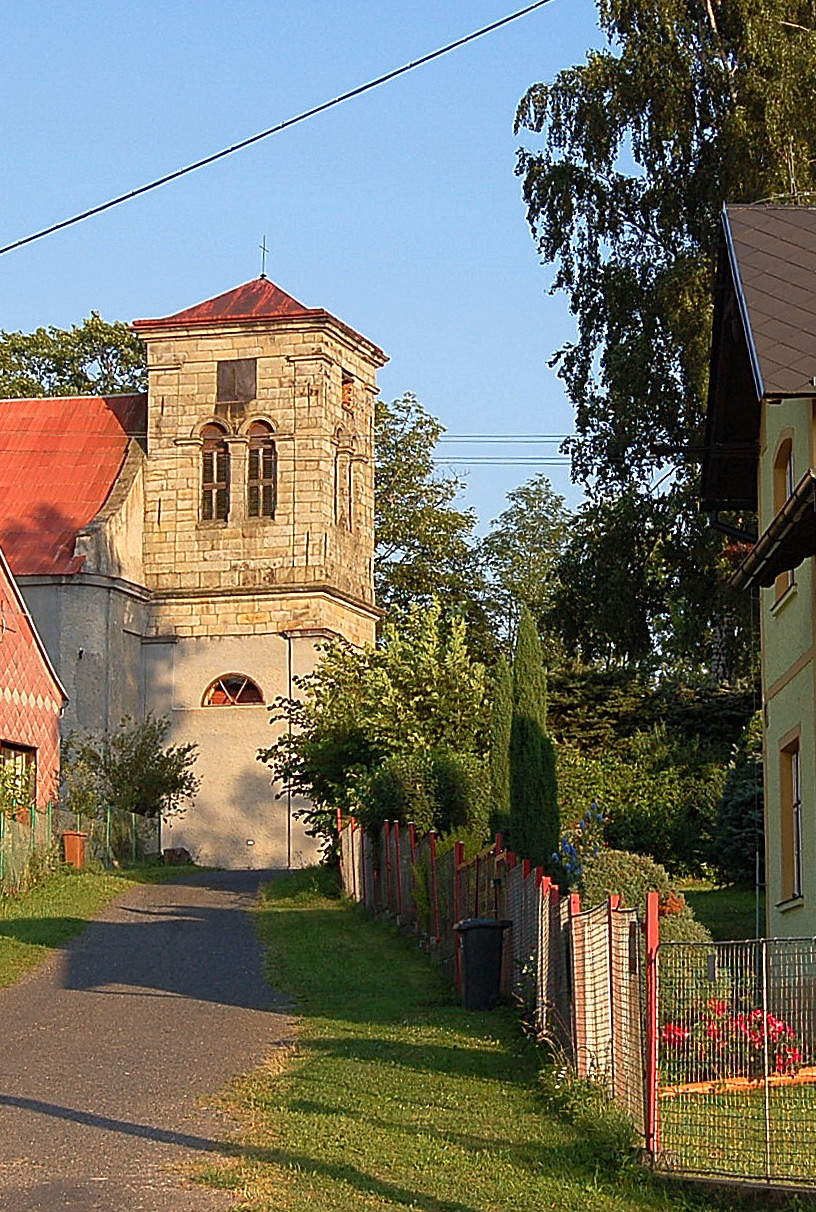
Church of Saints John and Paul

There are no railways or major roads passing through the municipality.

== Sights ==
The main landmark of Halže is the Church of Saints John and Paul. It was built in the late Baroque style in 1799–1801 and the Empire tower was added in 1855.

== Notable people ==
- David Kratochvíl (born 2007), paralympic swimmer
