= Artem Oliinyk =

Ukrainian para swimmer

Personal information
- Nationality: Ukrainian

Sport
- Sport: Para swimming
- Disability class: S5, SB4
Medal record
Men's para swimming
Representing Ukraine
World Championships
Gold medal – first place	2025 Singapore	Mixed 4×50 m freestyle relay 20 pts
Gold medal – first place	2025 Singapore	200 m freestyle S5
Silver medal – second place	2025 Singapore	50 m freestyle S5
Silver medal – second place	2025 Singapore	100 m freestyle S5
European Championships
Gold medal – first place	2026 Kocaeli	50 m freestyle S5
Gold medal – first place	2026 Kocaeli	50 m backstroke S5
Gold medal – first place	2026 Kocaeli	200 m freestyle S5
Bronze medal – third place	2026 Kocaeli	100 m breaststroke SB4
Bronze medal – third place	2026 Kocaeli	4×50 m medley relay 20pts

Artem Oliinyk is a Ukrainian para swimmer.

== Career ==
Oliinyk competed at the 2025 World Para Swimming Championships and won a gold medal in the mixed 4×50 metre freestyle relay 20 pts and a silver medal in the 50 metre freestyle S5 with a time of 31.42.
