= David Kratochvíl =

Czech Paralympic swimmer

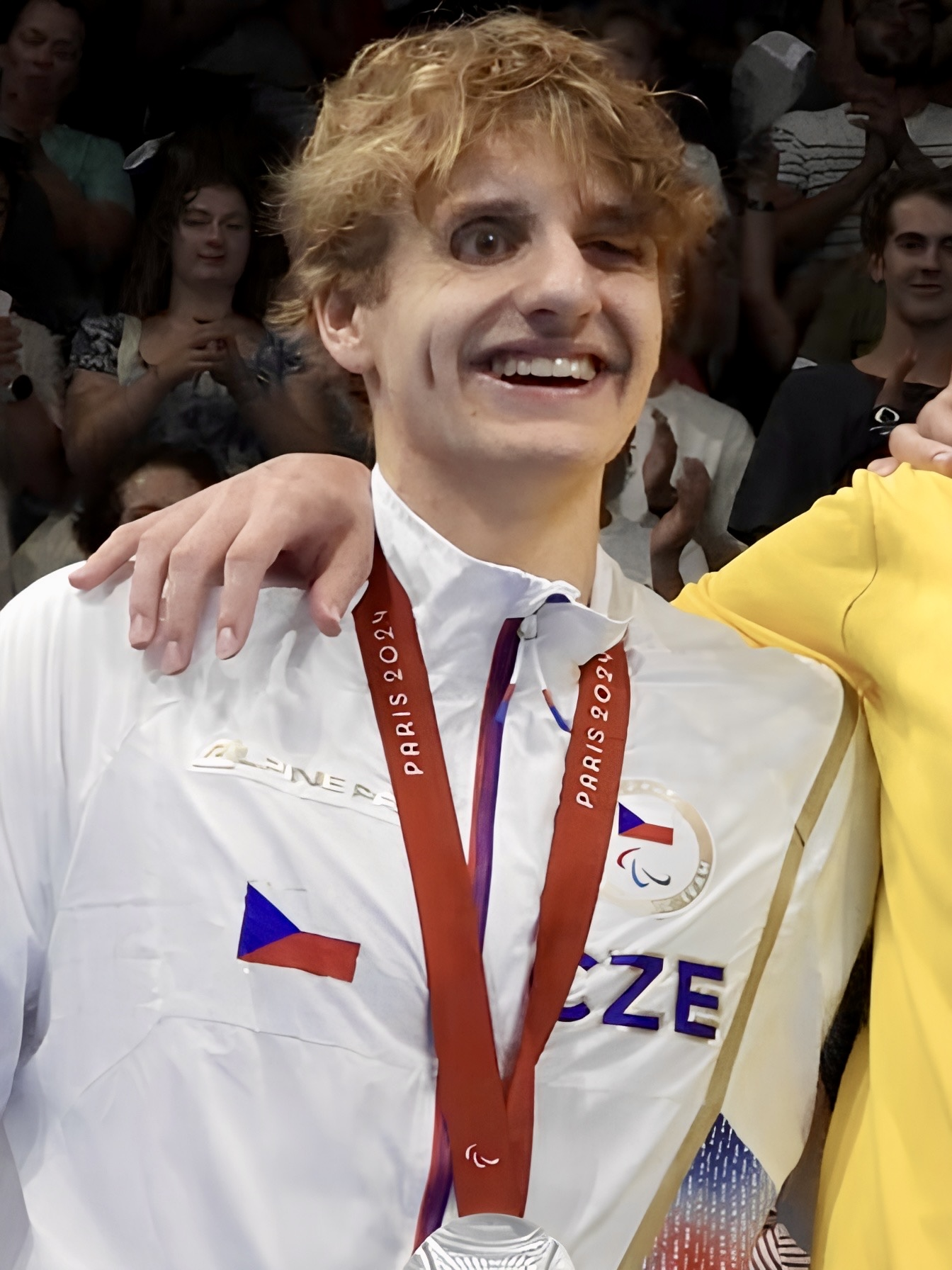
- Kratochvíl at the 2024 Summer Paralympics

Personal information
- Nationality: Czech
- Born: 23 October 2007 (age 18)
- Home town: Halže, Czech Republic

Sport
- Sport: Para swimming
- Disability class: S11, SB11, SM11
Medal record
Men's para swimming
Representing Czech Republic
| Event | 1st | 2nd | 3rd |
|---|---|---|---|
| Paralympic Games | 1 | 1 | 1 |
| World Championships | 6 | 1 | 2 |
| European Championships | 4 | 3 | 1 |
| Total | 11 | 5 | 4 |
Paralympic Games
| Gold medal – first place | 2024 Paris | 400 m freestyle S11 |
| Silver medal – second place | 2024 Paris | 100 m backstroke S11 |
| Bronze medal – third place | 2024 Paris | 200 m ind. medley SM11 |
World Championships
| Gold medal – first place | 2023 Manchester | 400 m freestyle S11 |
| Gold medal – first place | 2025 Singapore | 50 m freestyle S11 |
| Gold medal – first place | 2025 Singapore | 100 m butterfly S11 |
| Gold medal – first place | 2025 Singapore | 100 m freestyle S11 |
| Gold medal – first place | 2025 Singapore | 400 m freestyle S11 |
| Silver medal – second place | 2025 Singapore | 100 m backstroke S11 |
| Bronze medal – third place | 2025 Singapore | 100 m breaststroke SB11 |
| Bronze medal – third place | 2025 Singapore | 200 m ind. medley SM11 |
European Championships
| Gold medal – first place | 2024 Funchal | 100 m backstroke S11 |
| Gold medal – first place | 2026 Kocaeli | 50 m freestyle S11 |
| Gold medal – first place | 2026 Kocaeli | 400 m freestyle S11 |
| Gold medal – first place | 2026 Kocaeli | 100 m butterfly S11 |
| Gold medal – first place | 2026 Kocaeli | 200 m ind. medley SM11 |
| Silver medal – second place | 2024 Funchal | 100 m butterfly S11 |
| Silver medal – second place | 2024 Funchal | 50 m freestyle S11 |
| Silver medal – second place | 2024 Funchal | 400 m freestyle S11 |
| Silver medal – second place | 2026 Kocaeli | 100 m backstroke S11 |
| Bronze medal – third place | 2024 Funchal | 200 m ind. medley SM11 |

David Kratochvíl (born 23 October 2007) is a Czech para swimmer. He represented the Czech Republic at the 2024 Summer Paralympics.

== Career ==
Kratochvíl represented the Czech Republic at the 2023 World Para Swimming Championships and won a gold medal in the 400 metre freestyle S11 event.

Kratochvíl represented the Czech Republic at the 2024 Summer Paralympics and won a gold medal in the 400 metre freestyle S11, a silver medal in the 100 metre backstroke S11 and a bronze medal in the 200 metre individual medley SM11 event.

He competed at the 2025 World Para Swimming Championships and medaled in all seven events he took part in, including four gold medals, a silver medal and two bronze medals.

== Awards and recognition ==
- Medal of Merit (2025)

== Personal life ==
Kratochvíl lives in Halže.
