= Nigel Simpson =

England international rugby union player

- Born: Nigel Tausie Ashton Simpson; 25 April 1975 (age 51) Suva, Fiji
- Height: 6 ft 2 in (188 cm)
- Weight: 98 kg (216 lb; 15 st 6 lb)

Rugby union career
- Position: Wing
Senior career
Years	Team	Apps	(Points)
1999–2000	Bath	9	(20)
2000–2001	Rotherham	12	(5)
	Pontypridd		(0)
	Plymouth Albion		(0)
	Launceston		(0)
National sevens team
Years	Team		Comps
2000–2002	England		33 (151 pts)

Nigel Tausie Ashton Simpson (born 25 April 1975) is a former English rugby union player.

== Biography ==
Simpson was born in Suva, Fiji and is of Rotuman and English descent. His mother is Rotuman from Malha'a, Rotuma and his father is English.

=== Rugby career ===
Simpson played for the England sevens team from 2000 to 2002. He scored 29 tries from 33 games for the side. He captained the team at the 2001 London Sevens.

Simpson usually played on the wing. He spent the 1999–2000 Premiership Rugby season playing for Bath. He then joined Rotherham for a season before moving to Pontypridd. He has also played for Plymouth Albion and Launceston.
