= Federico Cristiani =

Italian Paralympic swimmer (born 2005)

Personal information
- Born: 6 July 2005 (age 20)

Sport
- Sport: Para swimming
- Disability class: S4
Medal record
Men's para swimming
Representing Italy
World Championships
Silver medal – second place	2025 Singapore	100 m freestyle S4
Silver medal – second place	2025 Singapore	200 m freestyle S4
European Championships
Silver medal – second place	2024 Funchal	100 m freestyle S4
Silver medal – second place	2024 Funchal	Mixed 4×50 m freestyle 20 pts

Federico Cristiani (born 6 July 2005) is an Italian para swimmer. He represented Italy at the 2024 Summer Paralympics.

== Career ==
Cristiani represented Italy at the 2024 Summer Paralympics. He finished in fourth place in the 100 metre freestyle S4 event, missing the bronze medal by 0.1 seconds. In September 2025, he competed at the 2025 World Para Swimming Championships and won a silver medal in the 100 metre freestyle S4 event.
