= Egor Bolotov =

Uzbekistani para swimmer

Personal information
- Nationality: Uzbekistani
- Born: 15 July 1997 (age 29)

Sport
- Sport: Para swimming
- Disability class: S13
Medal record
Men's para swimming
Representing Uzbekistan
World Championships
Gold medal – first place	2025 Singapore	100 m backstroke S13
Bronze medal – third place	2025 Singapore	100 m freestyle S13
Asian Para Games
Gold medal – first place	2026 Aichi-Nagoya	100 m freestyle S13
Gold medal – first place	2026 Aichi-Nagoya	100 m backstroke S13
Gold medal – first place	2026 Aichi-Nagoya	50 m freestyle S13
Gold medal – first place	2026 Aichi-Nagoya	200 m individual medley SM13
Silver medal – second place	2026 Aichi-Nagoya	400 m freestyle S13

Egor Bolotov (born 15 July 1997) is an Uzbek para swimmer.

== Career ==
Bolotov competed at the 2025 World Para Swimming Championships and won a gold medal in the 100 metre backstroke S13 event. He also won a bronze medal in the 100 metre freestyle S13 event with a time of 53.13 seconds.
