= Eduard Horodianyn =

Ukrainian para swimmer

Personal information
- Nationality: Ukrainian
- Born: 21 August 2005 (age 21)

Sport
- Sport: Para swimming
- Disability class: S8
Medal record
Men's para swimming
Representing Ukraine
World Championships
Gold medal – first place	2025 Singapore	50 m freestyle S8
Silver medal – second place	2025 Singapore	100 m backstroke S8
Bronze medal – third place	2025 Singapore	100 m freestyle S8
European Championships
Gold medal – first place	2026 Kocaeli	50 m freestyle S8
Gold medal – first place	2026 Kocaeli	100 m freestyle S8
Gold medal – first place	2026 Kocaeli	100 m butterfly S8
Silver medal – second place	2026 Kocaeli	200 m ind. medley SM8
Bronze medal – third place	2026 Kocaeli	100 m backstroke S8

Eduard Horodianyn (Ukrainian: Едуард Городянин; born 21 August 2005) is a Ukrainian para swimmer.

== Career ==
Horodianyn competed at the 2025 World Para Swimming Championships in Singapore, where he won three medals. He claimed gold in the 50 metre freestyle S8, silver in the 100 metre backstroke S8, and bronze in the 100 metre freestyle S8.

== Personal life ==
Horodianyn has attended the Poltava National Technical University, in the Faculty of Physical Culture and Sports.
