= Umut Ünlü =

Turkish Paralympic swimmer (born 2001)

Personal information
- Nationality: Turkish
- Born: 28 July 2001 (age 25) Gevaş, Van Province, Turkey

Sport
- Sport: Paralympic swimming
- Disability class: S3, SM3
Medal record
Men's para swimming
Representing Turkey
Paralympic Games
Gold medal – first place	2024 Paris	50 m freestyle S3
Gold medal – first place	2024 Paris	200 m freestyle S3
World Championships
Bronze medal – third place	2025 Singapore	200 m freestyle S3
European Championships
Silver medal – second place	2026 Kocaeli	50 m breaststroke SB2
Silver medal – second place	2026 Kocaeli	200 m freestyle S3
Bronze medal – third place	2024 Funchal	200 m freestyle S3
Bronze medal – third place	2024 Funchal	150 m ind. medley SM3

Umut Ünlü (born 28 July 2001) is a Turkish Paralympic swimmer. He represented Turkey at the 2024 Summer Paralympics.

== Career ==
Ünlü represented Turkey at the 2024 Summer Paralympics and won gold medals in the 50 metre freestyle S3 and the 200 metre freestyle event. This made him the first athlete from Turkey to win two gold medals at the same Paralympics.

== Personal life ==
Ünlü was born in Gevaş, Van Province and had no hands or feet, and fused vocal cords from birth.
