= Kirill Pulver =

Russian para swimmer (born 2003)

Personal information
- Native name: Кирилл Пульвер
- Nationality: Russian
- Born: 19 June 2003 (age 23)

Sport
- Sport: Para swimming
- Disability class: S5
Medal record
Men's para swimming
Representing Neutral Paralympic Athletes
Paralympic Games
Silver medal – second place	2024 Paris	200 m freestyle S5
Bronze medal – third place	2024 Paris	100 m freestyle S5
World Championships
Bronze medal – third place	2025 Singapore	100m freestyle S5
Silver medal – second place	2025 Singapore	200m freestyle S5
European Championships
Silver medal – second place	2024 Funchal	100 m freestyle S5
Silver medal – second place	2024 Funchal	200 m freestyle S5
Bronze medal – third place	2024 Funchal	50 m freestyle S5
Bronze medal – third place	2024 Funchal	50 m backstroke S5
Representing Russia
European Championships
Silver medal – second place	2026 Kocaeli	200 m freestyle S5
Bronze medal – third place	2026 Kocaeli	50 m freestyle S5

Kirill Pulver (Russian: Кирилл Пульвер, born 19 June 2003) is a Russian swimmer, who won silver in the 200 m freestyle S5 at the 2024 Summer Paralympics in Paris.
