= Xie Zhili =

Chinese Paralympic swimmer (born 2005)

Personal information
- Nationality: Chinese
- Born: 25 June 2005 (age 21)

Sport
- Sport: Para swimming
- Disability class: S9, SM9
Medal record
Men's para swimming
Representing China
World Championships
Silver medal – second place	2025 Singapore	Mixed 4×100 m freestyle relay 34 pts

Xie Zhili (born 25 June 2005) is a Chinese para swimmer. He represented China at the 2024 Summer Paralympics.

== Career ==
Xie represented China at the 2024 Summer Paralympics. His best finish was fourth place in the 50 metre freestyle S9 event. He competed at the 2025 World Para Swimming Championships and won a silver medal in the Mixed 4 × 100 m freestyle relay 20 pts event.
