= Timofei Guk =

Russian para swimmer (born 2002)

Personal information
- Native name: Тимофей Гук
- Nationality: Russian

Sport
- Sport: Para swimming
- Disability class: S12
Medal record
Men's para swimming
Representing Neutral Paralympic Athletes
World Championships
Gold medal – first place	2025 Singapore	100 m breaststroke SB12
Bronze medal – third place	2025 Singapore	200 m medley SM13

Timofei Guk (Russian: Тимофей Гук) is a Russian para swimmer.

== Career ==
Guk competed at the 2024 Russian Blind Sports Championship and won four medals for the St. Petersburg national team, including two gold medals. He competed at the 2025 Para Swimming World Series 2025 in Paris, France, and won a silver medal in the 100 meter breaststroke event. He then competed at the 2025 World Para Swimming Championships and won a gold medal in the 100 metre breaststroke SB12 event.
