= Jack Gill =

Australian rules footballer

- Gill in May 1925

Personal information
- Full name: John Anthony Gill
- Born: 10 January 1898; St Kilda, Victoria
- Died: 18 July 1967 (aged 69); Ormond, Victoria
- Original team: St Kilda Juniors
- Debut: Round 1, 1925, Hawthorn vs. Richmond, at Glenferrie Oval
- Height: 171 cm (5 ft 7 in)
- Position: Wing

Playing career^{1}
| Years | Club | Games (Goals) |
| 1922–1924 | Hawthorn (VFA) | 44 (12) |
| 1925–1928 | Hawthorn | 40 (9) |
- ^{1} Playing statistics correct to the end of 1928.

John Anthony Gill (10 January 1898 – 18 July 1967) was an Australian rules footballer who played with Hawthorn Football Club in the Victorian Football League (VFL).

== Early life ==
Jack Gill was the youngest of nine children of Thomas Gill (1858–1929) and Bridget Annie Gill, nee O'Callaghan (1857–1927), and was born and raised in the St Kilda area.

== Football ==
Gill joined Hawthorn from St Kilda Juniors at the start of the 1922 VFA season and he continued to play throughout their first four seasons of VFL football, making 40 appearances in this competition including being a member of their inaugural VFL side.

== After football ==
After his football career Gill worked as a stockbroker in Melbourne. He married Melinda Christina Kate Ingram in 1928 and they had two children together (Ted and Peter) and lived in Ormond.

== Death ==
Jack Gill died in 1967 at the age of 69.
