= Juan Ferrón Gutiérrez =

Spanish para swimmer (born 2003)

Personal information
- Nationality: Spanish
- Born: 13 June 2003 (age 23) Vigo, Spain

Sport
- Sport: Para swimming
- Disability class: S13, SB12
Medal record
Men's para swimming
Representing Spain
World Championships
Silver medal – second place	2025 Singapore	Mixed 4×100 m medley relay 49pts

Juan Ferrón Gutiérrez (born 13 June 2003) is a Spanish para swimmer. He represented Spain at the 2024 Summer Paralympics.

== Career ==
Ferrón represented Spain at the 2024 Summer Paralympics. He competed at the 2025 World Para Swimming Championships and won a silver medal in the mixed 4 × 100 metre medley relay 49 pts.
