= Turgut Aslan Yaraman =

Turkish para swimmer (born 2007)

Personal information
- Born: 22 May 2007 (age 19)

Sport
- Sport: Para swimming
Medal record
Representing Turkey
World Championships
Bronze medal – third place	2025 Singapore	100m backstroke S8
European Championships
Gold medal – first place	2024 Funchal	50 m butterfly S7
Gold medal – first place	2026 Kocaeli	100 m backstroke S8
Gold medal – first place	2026 Kocaeli	200 m ind. medley SM8
Silver medal – second place	2024 Funchal	100 m backstroke S7
Silver medal – second place	2024 Funchal	50 m freestyle S7
Silver medal – second place	2024 Funchal	100 m freestyle S7
Silver medal – second place	2026 Kocaeli	100 m freestyle S8
Bronze medal – third place	2024 Funchal	400 m freestyle S7

Turgut Aslan Yaraman (born 22 May 2007) is a Turkish para swimmer who competes in international swimming competitions.

== Early life ==
Turgut Aslan Yaraman was born on 22 May 2007. From the day of his birth, he had a congenital issue on his left leg, leading him to be diagnosed with Escobar syndrome. He turned to swimming to overcome this and, at the age of 10, he was included in the Paralympic national team.

== Career ==
In April 2024, Yaraman competed at the 2024 World Para Swimming European Open Championships. In the S7 category, he won a gold medal in the 50 m butterfly event. He also won a medal in four other events he entered, three of which were silver.

Yaraman represented Turkey at the 2024 Summer Paralympics held in Paris, France. He competed in four events, including the Men's 100 metre backstroke S8, where he finished in fourth place.

At the 2025 World Para Swimming Championships held in Singapore, Yaraman won the bronze medal 100m backstroke S8, which was also his first medal in the championships.
