= Koehn Boyd =

American paralympic swimmer

Personal information
- Born: Ukraine
- Home town: Minneapolis, Minnesota, U.S.

Sport
- Sport: Para swimming
- Disability: Prune belly syndrome
- Disability class: S10
Medal record
Men's para swimming
Representing the United States
World Championships
Silver medal – second place	2025 Singapore	200 m medley SM10
Silver medal – second place	2025 Singapore	400 m freestyle S10

Koehn Boyd is an American para swimmer.

== Early life ==
Boyd was born in Ukraine and adopted by Minnesota pastor Joe Boyd and his wife Michelle when he was 20 months old. Boyd was born without abdominal muscles, a condition known as Prune belly syndrome. He was the 13th person in the world to have a muscle transposition operation in which surgeons took the top layer of muscle from both his legs and sewed it into his stomach.

== Career ==
In December 2024, Boyd competed at the 2024 U.S. Paralympics Swimming National Championships, where he won six national titles and was named Swimmer of the Meet. In June 2025, he competed at the 2025 U.S. Paralympics Swimming National Championships, where she set two World Records in the 400 metre individual medley SM10 and 200 metre butterfly S10 event, and named Swimmer of the Meet for the second consecutive year. He was subsequently named to team USA's roster for the 2025 World Para Swimming Championships. During the World Championships, he won a silver medal in the 200 metre individual medley SM10 event.
