= Koral Berkin Kutlu =

Turkish Paralympic swimmer (born 2005)

Personal information
- Born: 12 October 2005 (age 20) Istanbul, Turkey

Sport
- Country: Turkey
- Sport: Paralympic swimming
- Disability class: S5
Medal record
Paralympic swimming
Representing Turkey
World Championships
| Bronze medal – third place | 2022 Madeira | 100m freestyle S5 |
| Bronze medal – third place | 2022 Madeira | 200m freestyle S5 |

Koral Berkin Kutlu (born 12 October 2005) is a Turkish Paralympic swimmer who competes in international swimming competitions. He is a double World bronze medalist and has competed at the 2020 Summer Paralympics where he reached the final of the 200m freestyle S5 and finished in fifth position. He was born with undeveloped right arm and left leg.
