= Sebastian Massabie =

Canadian Paralympic swimmer (born 2004)

Personal information
- Nationality: Canadian
- Born: 12 December 2004 (age 21)
- Home town: Surrey, British Columbia, Canada

Sport
- Sport: Para swimming
- Disability class: S4
Medal record
Men's para swimming
Representing Canada
Paralympic Games
| Gold medal – first place | 2024 Paris | 50 m freestyle S4 |

Sebastian Massabie (born 12 December 2004) is a Canadian Paralympic swimmer. He represented Canada at the 2024 Summer Paralympics.

== Career ==
Massabie represented Canada at the 2024 Summer Paralympics and won a gold medal in the 50 metre freestyle S4 event with a world record time of 35.61 seconds.
