= Oleksandr Komarov =

Oleksandr Komarov could refer to:

- Oleksandr Komarov (Ukrainian: Олександр Комаров; born 1972) is a Ukrainian telecommunications top-level manager, CEO of Kyivstar
- Oleksandr Komarov (Ukrainian: Олександр Комаров; born 1988) is a Ukrainian Paralympic swimmer

== See also ==
- Aleksandr Komarov (wrestler)
- Aleksandr Komarov (ice hockey)
- Komarov (surname)
