= Poppy Maskill =

British Paralympic swimmer

Poppy Maskill MBE
Personal information
- Full name: Poppy Willow Maskill
- Nationality: British
- Born: 22 March 2005 (age 21)

Sport
- Sport: Swimming
- Strokes: Butterfly, backstroke, breaststroke, freestyle
- Classifications: S14, SM14, SB14
- Club: National Performance Centre, Manchester
Medal record
Women's para-swimming
Representing Great Britain
Paralympic Games
Gold medal – first place	2024 Paris	100 m backstroke S14
Gold medal – first place	2024 Paris	100 m butterfly S14
Gold medal – first place	2024 Paris	Mixed 4×100 m freestyle relay S14
Silver medal – second place	2024 Paris	200 m freestyle S14
Silver medal – second place	2024 Paris	200 m ind. medley SM14
World Championships
Gold medal – first place	2022 Madeira	Mixed 4×100 medley relay S14
Gold medal – first place	2023 Manchester	Mixed 4×100 freestyle relay S14
Gold medal – first place	2025 Singapore	200 m freestyle S14
Gold medal – first place	2025 Singapore	100 m backstroke S14
Gold medal – first place	2025 Singapore	100 m butterfly S14
Gold medal – first place	2025 Singapore	Mixed 4×100 m freestyle relay S14
Gold medal – first place	2025 Singapore	Mixed 4×100 m medley relay S14
Silver medal – second place	2022 Madeira	100 m backstroke S14
Silver medal – second place	2023 Manchester	100 m backstroke S14
Silver medal – second place	2023 Manchester	100 m butterfly S14
Silver medal – second place	2023 Manchester	Mixed 4×100 medley relay S14
Bronze medal – third place	2022 Madeira	100 m butterfly S14
Bronze medal – third place	2023 Manchester	200 m ind. medley SM14
European Championships
Gold medal – first place	2026 Kocaeli	100 m backstroke S14
Silver medal – second place	2026 Kocaeli	200 m freestyle S14
Bronze medal – third place	2026 Kocaeli	100 m butterfly S14
Representing England
Commonwealth Games
Silver medal – second place	2026 Glasgow	200 m freestyle S14

Poppy Willow Maskill (born 22 March 2005) is a British Paralympic swimmer. Maskill competes in the S14, SM14 and SB14 classifications for swimmers with intellectual impairments. She won three gold and two silver medals at the 2024 Summer Paralympics in Paris, making her ParalympicsGB's most successful athlete at the Games.

== Early life ==
Maskill was born in 2005 in Cheshire and grew up in Middlewich. She has two sisters. She was chosen as the Middlewich Rose Queen in 2014, when she was nine.

== Career ==
=== Senior career ===
==== 2022 ====
Her first major international competition of her career was the 2022 World Championships in Madeira, which took place in June of that year. She competed in four events and came away with three medals: a gold in the mixed 4x100 m medley relay S14, a silver in the 100 m backstroke, and a bronze in the 100 m butterfly. In August she competed in the 200 m freestyle S14 in the Commonwealth Games in Birmingham, finishing fourth behind England teammates Jessica-Jane Applegate and Louise Fiddes, with Northern Irish competitor Bethany Firth taking gold. Maskill rounded out a successful first senior year at the British Para-Swimming Winter National Meet in November. She medalled in all her age-category events, winning four gold and two silver medals.

==== 2023 ====
Maskill followed up her success at the previous year's World Championships at the 2023 edition in Manchester, competing in five events and medalling in all five. She won gold in the mixed 4x100 m freestyle relay S14 alongside Applegate, William Ellard and Jordan Catchpole. She, Applegate, Ellard and Scott Quin took silver in the medley relay. Maskill took individual medals in the 100 m butterfly S14 (silver), 100 m backstroke S14 (silver) and 200 m individual medley SM14 (bronze).

==== 2024 ====
On 20 May 2024 it was announced that Maskill had been selected as a member of the ParalympicsGB swimming squad that would compete at the 2024 Games in Paris. She competed in five events at the Paralympics, medalling in all five. She won three gold medals: in the 100 m butterfly S14, 100 m backstroke S14, and mixed 4x100 m freestyle relay S14 (alongside William Ellard, Rhys Darbey and Olivia Newman-Baronius). She additionally set a world record in the 100 m butterfly S14 final; her medal in this event was also Great Britain's first gold of the Games. She won two silver medals in the 200 m freestyle S14 and 200 m individual medley SM14. Maskill's medal haul made her ParalympicsGB's most successful athlete at the Games. In recognition of this, she was given the honour – alongside para-taekwondo gold medallist Matt Bush – of being a GB flagbearer at the Paralympics Closing Ceremony.

2025

In March 2025, it was announced that Maskill was one of 15 Paralympic champions to receive funding from UK sport, during the 2025 season. At the 2025 World Para Swimming Championships in Singapore, Maskill won gold in the Women's S14 100 m backstroke as part of a British clean sweep of the podium, alongside Bethany Firth and Georgia Sheffield.

== Honours and awards ==
In 2021, Maskill won Disability Sports Achiever at the Everybody Awards, which was presented to her by Baroness Tanni Grey-Thompson. She had previously been nominated for the award in 2019.

The following year, she made the ten-person shortlist of SportsAid's One-to-Watch Award. She additionally won Para-Swimming Emerging Athlete of 2021-22 at the 2022 British Swimming Awards.

In 2023 Maskill was included on the longlist of ten athletes nominated for BBC Young Sports Personality of the Year.

Following her performances at the 2024 Paralympics, Maskill was awarded the Freedom of Middlewich, She is only the fifth person to be given the honour.

Maskill was appointed Member of the Order of the British Empire (MBE) in the 2025 New Year Honours for services to swimming.

== See also ==
- Swimming at the 2024 Summer Paralympics
