= 2023 World Para Swimming Championships – Medley relays =

The medley relay events at the 2023 World Para Swimming Championships were four mixed sex events held at the Manchester Aquatics Centre between 31 July and 6 August. One was held solely for S14 (intellectual disability) athletes; the other three were held on an aggregate points based system to allow swimmers from multiple classifications to be eligible for a relay, with the lower numbers representing greater levels of impairment. Three of the events were held over 4 x 100 metres. One, for the most impaired athletes, was held over 4 x 50 metres.

== Medalists ==
Event	Gold	Silver	Bronze
Mixed 4 × 100 m medley relay (S14)	Australia; Ben Hance; Jake Michel; Paige Leonhardt; Madeleine McTernan	Great Britain; Poppy Maskill; Scott Quin; William Ellard; Jessica-Jane Applegate	Brazil; Lucilene da Silva Sousa; Matheus Rheine; Douglas Matera; Maria Carolina Gomes Santiago
Mixed 4 x 50m medley relay (20 points)	China; Yuan Weiyi; Cheng Jiao; Jiang Yuyan; Guo Jincheng	Ukraine; Anna Hontar; Andrii Drapkin; Yaroslav Semenenko; Iryna Poida	Spain; Antoni Ponce Bertran; Miguel Luque; Marta Fernández Infante; Sarai Gascon
Mixed 4 × 100 m medley relay (34 points)	Spain; Inigo Llopis Sanz; Anastasiya Dmytriv; José Antonio Mari; Sarai Gascón	Italy; Federico Bicelli; Stefano Raimondi; Alessia Scortechini; Xenia Francesca Palazzo	Brazil; Mariana Ribeiro; Ruan de Souza; Gabriel Cristiano Silva de Souza; Cecília Jerônimo de Araújo
Mixed 4 × 100 m medley relay (49 points)	Ukraine; Kateryna Tkachuk; Oleksii Fedyna; Oleksii Virchenko; Anna Stetsenko	Spain; Enrique José Alhambra Mollar; Marian Polo López; María Delgado Nadal; José Ramón Cantero Elvira	Brazil; Maria Carolina Gomes Santiago; Guilherme Batista Silva; Lucilene Da Silva Sousa; Matheus Rheine
