= 2022 World Para Swimming Championships – Women's 100 metre backstroke =

The women's 100m backstroke events at the 2022 World Para Swimming Championships were held at the Penteada Olympic Swimming Complex in Madeira between 12 and 18 June.

== Medalists ==
Event	Gold	Silver	Bronze
S2	Yip Pin Xiu; Singapore	Fabiola Ramírez Martínez; Mexico	Angela Procida; Italy
S6	Shelby Newkirk; Canada	Anna Hontar; Ukraine	Nora Meister; Switzerland
S7	Julia Gaffney; United States	Danielle Dorris; Canada	McKenzie Coan; United States
S8	Xenia Palazzo; Italy	Kateryna Denysenko; Ukraine	Mira Jeanne Maack; Germany
S9	Núria Marquès; Spain	Hannah Aspden; United States	Mariana Ribeiro; Brazil
S10	Bianka Pap; Hungary	Anaëlle Roulet; France	Aurélie Rivard; Canada
S11	Chikako Ono; Japan	Martina Rabbolini; Italy	Matilde Alcázar; Mexico
S12	Hannah Russell; Great Britain	Maria Carolina Gomes Santiago; Brazil	Maria Delgado Nadal; Spain
S13	Gia Pergolini; United States	Katja Dedekind; Australia	Roisin Ni Riain; Ireland
S14	Bethany Firth; Great Britain	Poppy Maskill; Great Britain	Jessica-Jane Applegate; Great Britain

== Results ==
=== S6 ===
Final

Eight swimmers from eight nations took part.

Rank	Name	Nation	Result	Notes
1st place, gold medalist(s)	Shelby Newkirk	Canada	1:20.96	CR
2nd place, silver medalist(s)	Anna Hontar	Ukraine	1:23.46	
3rd place, bronze medalist(s)	Nora Meister	Switzerland	1:24.77	
4	Grace Harvey	United Kingdom	1:28.13	
5	Sara Vargas Blanco	Colombia	1:28.73	
6	Vianney Trejo Delgadillo	Mexico	1:36.31	
7	Gabriele Cepaviciute	Lithuania	1:38.43	
8	Maria Tsakona	Greece	1:45.38	

=== S7 ===
Final

Seven swimmers from four nations took part.

Rank	Name	Nation	Result	Notes
1st place, gold medalist(s)	Julia Gaffney	United States	1:21.03	
2nd place, silver medalist(s)	Danielle Dorris	Canada	1:23.00	
3rd place, bronze medalist(s)	McKenzie Coan	United States	1:24.42	
4	Camille Bérubé	Canada	1:24.49	
5	Agnes Kramer	Sweden	1:28.66	
6	Nikita Howarth	New Zealand	1:29.19	
7	Nicola St Clair Maitland	Sweden	1:32.63	

=== S12 ===
Final

Eight swimmers from eight nations took part.

Rank	Name	Nation	Result	Notes
1st place, gold medalist(s)	Hannah Russell	United Kingdom	1:08.75	
2nd place, silver medalist(s)	Maria Carolina Gomes Santiago	Brazil	1:09.68	
3rd place, bronze medalist(s)	Maria Delgado Nadal	Spain	1:13.65	
4	Léane Morceau	France	1:16.66	
5	Alessia Berra	Italy	1:17.18	
6	Karina Petrikovičová	Slovakia	1:18.47	
7	Analuz Pellitero	Argentina	1:18.69	
8	Sophie Jin Wen Soon	Singapore	1:28.65	

=== S13 ===
Final

Six swimmers from five nations took part.

Rank	Name	Nation	Result	Notes
1st place, gold medalist(s)	Gia Pergolini	United States	1:04.80	CR
2nd place, silver medalist(s)	Katja Dedekind	Australia	1:05.98	OC
3rd place, bronze medalist(s)	Roisin Ni Riain	Ireland	1:08.40	
4	Carlotta Gilli	Italy	1:08.51	
5	Colleen Young	United States	1:12.20	
6	Ayano Tsujiuchi	Japan	1:13.02	
