= Swimming at the 2020 Summer Paralympics – Men's 400 metre freestyle S13 =

Men's 400 metre freestyle S13 at the XVI Paralympic Games
- Venue: Tokyo Aquatics Centre
- Dates: 27 August 2021
- Competitors: 10 from 8 nations

Medalists
| 1st place, gold medalist(s) | | Ihar Boki | Belarus |
| 2nd place, silver medalist(s) | | Kyrylo Garaschenko | Ukraine |
| 3rd place, bronze medalist(s) | | Alex Portal | France |

The men's 400 metre freestyle S13 event at the 2020 Paralympic Games took place on 27 August 2021, at the Tokyo Aquatics Centre.

== Heats ==
The swimmers with the top eight times, regardless of heat, advanced to the final.

| Rank | Heat | Lane | Name | Nationality | Time | Notes |
|---|---|---|---|---|---|---|
| 1 | 2 | 4 | Ihar Boki | Belarus | 4:06.02 | Q |
| 2 | 1 | 4 | Kyrylo Garashchenko | Ukraine | 4:10.42 | Q |
| 3 | 2 | 5 | Alex Portal | France | 4:11.07 | Q |
| 4 | 2 | 6 | Vladimir Sotnikov | RPC | 4:20.66 | Q |
| 5 | 2 | 2 | Taliso Engel | Germany | 4:21.09 | Q |
| 6 | 1 | 5 | Braedan Jason | Australia | 4:21.59 | Q |
| 7 | 2 | 3 | Ivan Salguero Oteiza | Spain | 4:21.94 | Q |
| 8 | 1 | 3 | Sergey Punko | RPC | 4:28.91 | Q |
| 9 | 1 | 6 | Genki Saito | Japan | 4:29.03 | |
| 10 | 1 | 2 | Danylo Chufarov | Ukraine | 4:37.26 | |

== Final ==
400m freestyle final
| Rank | Lane | Name | Nationality | Time | Notes |
|---|---|---|---|---|---|
| 1st place, gold medalist(s) | 4 | Ihar Boki | Belarus | 3.58.18 | |
| 2nd place, silver medalist(s) | 5 | Kyrylo Garaschenko | Ukraine | 4.02.07 | |
| 3rd place, bronze medalist(s) | 3 | Alex Portal | France | 4.06.49 | |
| 4 | 7 | Braedan Jason | Australia | 4.12.75 | |
| 5 | 6 | Vladimir Sotnikov | RPC | 4.15.93 | |
| 6 | 2 | Taliso Engel | Germany | 4.20.73 | |
| 7 | 1 | Ivan Salguero Oteiza | Spain | 4.21.56 | |
| 8 | 8 | Sergey Punko | RPC | 4.28.52 | |
