= Swimming at the 2024 Summer Paralympics – Women's 400 metre freestyle S13 =

Women's 400 metre freestyle S13 at the XVII Paralympic Games
- Venue: La Défense Arena
- Dates: 31 August 2024
- Competitors: 10 from 8 nations

Medalists
1st place, gold medalist(s)		Olivia Chambers	United States
2nd place, silver medalist(s)		Carlotta Gilli	Italy
3rd place, bronze medalist(s)		Anna Stetsenko	Ukraine

The Women's 400 metre freestyle S13 event at the 2024 Paralympic Games took place on 31 August 2024, at the Paris La Défense Arena.

== Heats ==
The swimmers with the top eight times, regardless of heat, advanced to the final.

Rank	Heat	Lane	Name	Nationality	Time	Notes
1	1	4	Olivia Chambers	United States	4:33.28	Q
2	2	4	Carlotta Gilli	Italy	4:43.84	Q
3	2	5	Anna Stetsenko	Ukraine	4:44.48	Q
4	1	3	Ariadna Edo Beltran	Spain	4:51.11	Q
5	2	6	Shokhsanamkhon Toshpulatova	Uzbekistan	4:52.14	Q
6	1	5	Aleksandra Ziablitseva	Neutral Paralympic Athletes	4:53.99	Q
7	2	3	Emma Feliu Martin	Spain	4:57.48	Q
8	2	2	Alani Ferreira	South Africa	4:58.09	Q
9	2	6	Johanna Doehler	Germany	5:10.84	
10	1	2	Danika Vyncke	South Africa	5:10.91	

== Final ==
400m freestyle final
Rank	Lane	Name	Nationality	Time	Notes
1st place, gold medalist(s)	4	Olivia Chambers	United States	4:29.93	
2nd place, silver medalist(s)	5	Carlotta Gilli	Italy	4:31.83	
3rd place, bronze medalist(s)	3	Anna Stetsenko	Ukraine	4:36.17	PR
4	6	Ariadna Edo Beltran	Spain	4:48.93	
5	1	Emma Feliu Martin	Spain	4:49.20	
6	7	Aleksandra Ziablitseva	Neutral Paralympic Athletes	4:49.47	
7	2	Shokhsanamkhon Toshpulatova	Uzbekistan	4:49.91	
8	8	Alani Ferreira	South Africa	4:55.95	AF
