= Swimming at the 2020 Summer Paralympics – Women's 400 metre freestyle S13 =

Women's 400 metre freestyle S13 at the XVI Paralympic Games
- Venue: Tokyo Aquatics Centre
- Dates: 27 August 2021
- Competitors: 6 from 6 nations

Medalists
1st place, gold medalist(s)		Anna Stetsenko	Ukraine
2nd place, silver medalist(s)		Carlotta Gilli	Italy
3rd place, bronze medalist(s)		Katja Dedekind	Australia

The Women's 400 metre freestyle S13 event at the 2020 Paralympic Games took place on 27 August 2021, at the Tokyo Aquatics Centre.

== Heats ==
The swimmers with the top eight times, regardless of heat, advanced to the final.

Rank	Heat	Lane	Name	Nationality	Time	Notes
1	1	4	Anna Stetsenko	Ukraine	4:31.51	Q
2	2	4	Carlotta Gilli	Italy	4:38.69	Q
3	2	5	Katja Dedekind	Australia	4:42.33	Q
4	1	5	Shokhsanamkhon Toshpulatova	Uzbekistan	4:43.98	Q
5	2	3	María Delgado Nadal	Spain	4:44.49	Q
6	1	6	Róisín Ní Riain	Ireland	4:45.14	Q
7	2	6	Makayla Nietzel	United States	4:48.15	Q
8	1	3	Ayano Tsujiuchi	Japan	4:49.96	Q
9	2	2	Cailin Currie	United States	4:50.11	
10	1	2	Ariadna Edo Beltrán	Spain	4:51.55	
11	1	7	Daria Lukianenko	RPC	4:54.07	
12	2	7	Aleksandra Ziablitseva	RPC	4:58.15	
13	2	1	Alani Ferreira	South Africa	5:02.42	

== Final ==
400m freestyle final
Rank	Lane	Name	Nationality	Time	Notes
1st place, gold medalist(s)	4	Anna Stetsenko	Ukraine	4:23.92	
2nd place, silver medalist(s)	5	Carlotta Gilli	Italy	4:26.14	
3rd place, bronze medalist(s)	3	Katja Dedekind	Australia	4:35.87	OC
4	6	Shokhsanamkhon Toshpulatova	Uzbekistan	4:36.65	
5	7	Róisín Ní Riain	Ireland	4:44.09	
6	2	María Delgado Nadal	Spain	4:46.88	
7	1	Makayla Nietzel	United States	4:47.45	
8	8	Ayano Tsujiuchi	Japan	4:50.01	
