= Katja Dedekind =

Australian swimmer (born 2001)

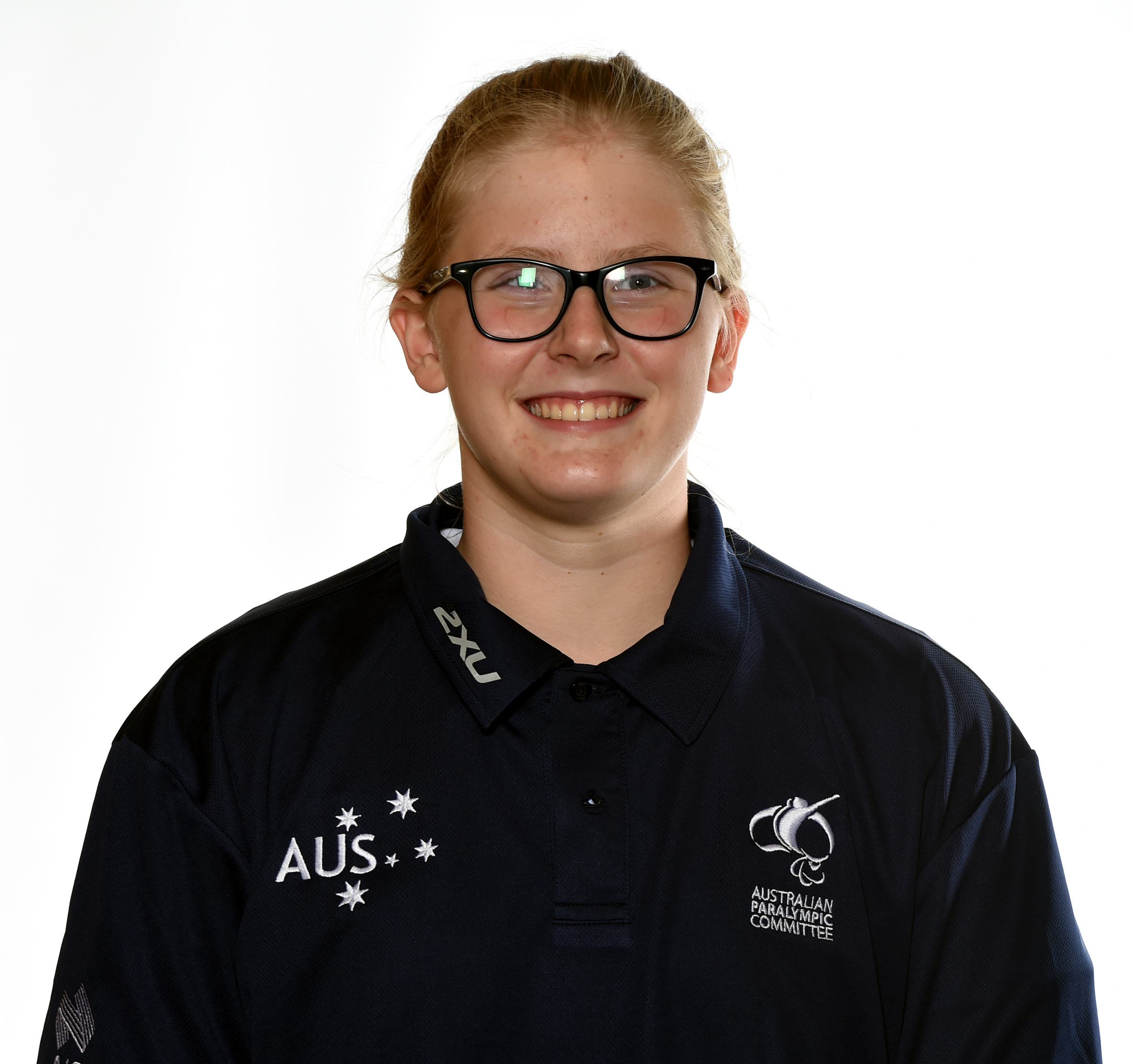

Personal information
- Full name: Katja Dedekind
- Nickname: Kitty-Kat
- Nationality: Australian
- Born: 17 August 2001 (age 25) Durban, South Africa

Sport
- Sport: Swimming
- Strokes: Backstroke and Freestyle
- Classifications: S13
- Club: Yeronga Park Swim Club
- Coach: Kate Sparkes
Medal record
Women's Paralympic swimming
Representing Australia
Paralympics
Bronze medal – third place	2016 Rio de Janeiro	100 m backstroke S13
Bronze medal – third place	2020 Tokyo	100 m backstroke S13
Bronze medal – third place	2020 Tokyo	400 m freestyle S13
World Championships
Gold medal – first place	2022 Madeira	50 m freestyle S13
Gold medal – first place	2023 Manchester	50 m freestyle S13
Silver medal – second place	2022 Madeira	100 m backstroke S13
Silver medal – second place	2022 Madeira	400 m freestyle S13
Silver medal – second place	2023 Manchester	100 m freestyle S13
Bronze medal – third place	2023 Manchester	100 m backstroke S13
Commonwealth Games
Gold medal – first place	2022 Birmingham	50 m freestyle S13

Katja Dedekind (born 17 August 2001) is an Australian Paralympic vision-impaired swimmer and goalball player. She won a bronze medal at the 2016 Rio Paralympic Games and two bronze medals at the 2020 Tokyo Paralympic Games.

== Personal life ==
Dedekind was born 17 August 2001 in Durban, South Africa. She has a twin brother. From congenital cataracts and amblyopia, she is blind in the right eye and has limited vision in the left eye. Previously from Kenmore, Brisbane, Dedekind now lives on the Sunshine Coast having graduated from Matthew Flinders Anglican College, Buderim, in 2019.

In March 2018, Dedekind had the honour of being a Queen's Baton Relay runner as one of 3500 Australians for the XXI Commonwealth Games.

Dedekind was awarded a Sporting Full Blue at Grffith University whilst studying a Bachelor of Communications.

Dedekind's motto is "If it doesn't challenge you, it doesn't change you".

== Sporting career ==
Dedekind competes in swimming and goalball. In swimming, she is classified as S13.

Dedekind took up goalball in 2012 after attending a 'come and try' day. At the 2012, Australian Goalball Championships in Melbourne, she was awarded the title 'Best Defensive Junior Player' She was a member of the winning team at the 2013 Australian Invitational Cup in Sydney.

Dedekind took up swimming at an early age with her twin brother, but did not start competing until 2012. At the 2015 Swimming Queensland Sprint Championships, she was awarded the 'Swimmer of the Meet' award for swimmers with a disability. In 2015, she won three gold and five silver medals at the 2015 SSA Pacific School Games. At 2016 Australian Swimming Championships, she won the bronze medal in the women's 200 m freestyle and finished fifth women's 50 m backstroke and women's 50 m butterfly. She is a member of the UQ Swim Club and was coached by David Heyden.

In 2016, Dedekind was selected to represent Australia at the 2016 Rio Paralympic Games. She competed in four events and achieved one podium finish. She won a bronze medal in the women's 100 m backstroke S13. She achieved seventh in 400 m freestyle S13. but didn't progress to the finals in 50 m freestyle S13, 100 m freestyle S13 and 100 m freestyle S13.

In August 2018 at the Pan Pacific Para Swimming Championships in Cairns, Queensland, just before her seventeenth birthday, Dedekind took gold with her fastest competitive time for the 100 m backstroke. She also achieved bronze in the women's 200 m individual medley for the SM12/13 classification, and silver in the 400 m freestyle S13.

She competed at the 2019 World Para Swimming Championships in London in four events but did not medal.

Dedekind is a member of the Australian Dolphins swim team. She was coached by Nathan Doyle while preparing for the 2020 Paralympic Games in Tokyo. At the games, Dedekind won a bronze medal in the Women's 100 m backstroke S13 with a time of 1:06.49, after achieving a personal best time of 1:07.38 in the Heats. She also won a bronze medal competing in the Women's 400 m freestyle S13. Her time of 4:35.87 was 12 seconds behind the winner, Anna Stetsenko, of Ukraine. Dedekind also competed in the 50 m freestyle S13 where she qualified for the finals but could only manage fourth in the final.

At the 2022 World Para Swimming Championships, Madeira, Dedekind won three medals - gold in the Women's 50 m Freestyle S13 and silver in the Women's 100 m Backstroke S13 and Women's 400 m Freestyle S13.

At the 2022 Commonwealth Games in Birmingham, Dedekind won the gold medal in Women's 50 m freestyle S13 in a world record time. At the 2023 World Para Swimming Championships, Manchester, England, Dedekind won three medals - gold, silver and bronze medal.

About June 2022, Dedekind changed clubs from SC Spartans with coach Nathan Doyle to the Yeronga Park Swim Club with coaches Robert van der Zant and Kate Sparkes.

At the 2024 Summer Paralympics in Paris, France, she swam in the Women's 50 m freestyle S13 but did not qualify for the final.

== Recognition ==
- 2016 - Junior Female Athlete of the Year, Sporting Wheelies and Disabled Association.
- 2021 - University of the Sunshine Coast Sportsperson of the Year
- 2022 - Queensland Sport Athlete with a Disability
