= 2026 World Para Swimming European Championships =

Swimming competition in Funchal, Portugal

World Para Swimming European Open Championships 2026
- Host city: Kocaeli, Turkey
- Date: 7–12 September 2026

The 2026 World Para Swimming European Open Championships took place in Kocaeli, Turkey from 7 to 12 September 2026. It was the 8th edition of the Championships and the first hosted in Turkey.

== Medals ==
Final table

* Host nation (Turkey)

| Rank | Nation | Gold | Silver | Bronze | Total |
|---|---|---|---|---|---|
| 1 | Russia (RUS) | 33 | 39 | 20 | 92 |
| 2 | Italy (ITA) | 29 | 16 | 16 | 61 |
| 3 | Ukraine (UKR) | 25 | 25 | 23 | 73 |
| 4 | Spain (ESP) | 9 | 17 | 20 | 46 |
| 5 | Germany (GER) | 9 | 7 | 11 | 27 |
| 6 | Turkey (TUR)* | 9 | 7 | 0 | 16 |
| 7 | Netherlands (NED) | 8 | 9 | 5 | 22 |
| 8 | Great Britain (GBR) | 5 | 6 | 10 | 21 |
| 9 | Czech Republic (CZE) | 5 | 3 | 2 | 10 |
| 10 | France (FRA) | 5 | 2 | 4 | 11 |
| 11 | Poland (POL) | 3 | 3 | 6 | 12 |
| 12 | Denmark (DEN) | 3 | 1 | 0 | 4 |
| 12 | Switzerland (SUI) | 3 | 1 | 0 | 4 |
| 14 | Hungary (HUN) | 2 | 6 | 5 | 13 |
| 15 | Austria (AUT) | 2 | 0 | 1 | 3 |
| 16 | Ireland (IRL) | 1 | 5 | 1 | 7 |
| 17 | Belarus (BLR) | 0 | 1 | 6 | 7 |
| 18 | Croatia (CRO) | 0 | 1 | 3 | 4 |
| 19 | Bosnia and Herzegovina (BIH) | 0 | 1 | 2 | 3 |
| 19 | Portugal (POR) | 0 | 1 | 2 | 3 |
| 21 | Estonia (EST) | 0 | 1 | 0 | 1 |
| 22 | Greece (GRE) | 0 | 0 | 4 | 4 |
| 23 | Lithuania (LTU) | 0 | 0 | 3 | 3 |
| 24 | Belgium (BEL) | 0 | 0 | 1 | 1 |
| 24 | Finland (FIN) | 0 | 0 | 1 | 1 |
| 24 | Norway (NOR) | 0 | 0 | 1 | 1 |
| 24 | Slovakia (SVK) | 0 | 0 | 1 | 1 |
| Totals (27 entries) | | 151 | 152 | 148 | 451 |

== Medalists ==
The following list is of the European Championship medalists.

=== Men ===
==== Freestyle ====
| Event | | Gold | Silver | Bronze |
|---|---|---|---|---|
| 50 metre | S3 | Josia Tim Topf; Germany | Serhii Palamarchuk; Ukraine | Denys Ostapchenko; Ukraine |
| 50 metre | S4 | Andreas Ernhofer; Austria | Roman Zhdanov; Russia | Dmytro Vynohradets; Ukraine |
| 50 metre | S5 | Artem Oliinyk; Ukraine | Oleksandr Komarov; Ukraine | Kirill Pulver; Russia |
| 50 metre | S6 | Antonio Fantin; Italy | Vladyslav Koshman; Ukraine | Laurent Chardard; France |
| 50 metre | S8 | Eduard Horodianyn; Ukraine | Turgut AslanYaraman; Turkey | Dimosthenis Michalentzakis; Greece |
| 50 metre | S9 | Simone Barlaam; Italy | Oliwier Krzyszkowski; Poland | Denis Tarasov; Russia |
| 50 metre | S10 | Ihor Nimchenko; Ukraine | Stefano Raimondi; Italy | Hugo Mera Tato; Spain |
| 50 metre | S11 | David Kratochvil; Czech Republic | Rogier Dorsman; Netherlands | Edgaras Matakas; Lithuania |
| 50 metre | S12 | Vladimir Sotnikov; Russia | Maksym Veraksa; Ukraine | Illia Yaremenko; Ukraine |
| 50 metre | S13 | Oleksii Virchenko; Ukraine | Egor Shchitkovskii; Russia | Enrique José Alhambra Mollar; Spain |
| 100 metre | S3 | Dimitri Granjux; France | Denys Ostapchenko; Ukraine | Josia Topf; Germany |
| 100 metre | S4 | Andreas Ernhofer; Austria | Roman Zhdanov; Russia | Dmytro Vynohradets; Ukraine |
| 100 metre | S5 | Artem Oliinyk; Ukraine | Kirill Pulver; Russia | Oleksandr Komarov; Ukraine |
| 100 metre | S6 | Antonio Fantin; Italy | Vladyslav Koshman; Ukraine | Laurent Chardard; France |
| 100 metre | S7 | Andrii Trusov; Ukraine | Federcio Bicelli; Italy | Danyii Bielyi; Ukraine |
| 100 metre | S8 | Eduard Horodianyn; Ukraine | Turgut Aslan Yaraman; Turkey | Andrei Nikolaev; Russia |
| 100 metre | S9 | Simone Barlaam; Italy | Denis Tarasov; Russia | Yahor Shchalkanau; Belarus |
| 100 metre | S10 | Stefano Raimondi; Italy | Ihor Nimchenko; Ukraine | Alan Ogorzalek; Poland |
| 100 metre | S11 | David Kratochvil; Czech Republic | Rogier Dorsman; Netherlands | Danylo Chufarov; Ukraine |
| 100 metre | S12 | Konstantin Burmistrov; Russia | Vladimir Sotnikov; Russia | Maksym Veraksa; Ukraine |
| 100 metre | S13 | Egor Shchitkovskii; Russia | Oleksii Virchenko; Ukraine | Enrique José Alhambra Mollar; Spain |
| 200 metre | S2 | Vladimir Danilenko; Russia | Jacek Czech; Poland | Kryzsztof Lechniak; Poland |
| 200 metre | S3 | Denys Ostapchenko; Ukraine | Umut Unlu; Turkey | Josia Tim Topf; Germany |
| 200 metre | S5 | Artem Oliinyk; Ukraine | Kirill Pulver; Russia | Francesco Bocciardo; Italy |
| 200 metre | S14 | William Ellard; Great Britain | Rodion Berdnik; Russia | Klim Rumiantsev; Russia |
| 400 metre | S6 | Antonio Fantin; Italy | Andrei Granichka; Russia | Mikhail Evseenko; Russia |
| 400 metre | S7 | Federico Bicelli; Italy | Riccardo Magrassi; Italy | Danyil Bielyi; Ukraine |
| 400 metre | S8 | Andrei Nikolaev; Russia | Alberto Amodeo; Italy | Evgenii Stepanov; Russia |
| 400 metre | S9 | Jacobo Garrido Brun; Spain | Simone Barlaam; Italy | Sam de Visser; Belgium |
| 400 metre | S10 | Bas Takken; Netherlands | Alan Ogorzanek; Poland | Balint Koeszegvary; Germany |
| 400 metre | S11 | David Kratochvil; Czech Republic | Marco Meneses; Portugal | Alex Kozlowski; Poland |
| 400 metre | S13 | Egor Shchitkovskii; Russia | Evgenii Lazutin; Russia | Yauheni Kavalionak; Belarus |

==== Backstroke ====
| Event | | Gold | Silver | Bronze |
|---|---|---|---|---|
| 50 metre | S1 | Francesco Bettella; Italy | Anton Kol; Ukraine | Dimitrios Karypidis; Greece |
| 50 metre | S3 | Denys Ostapchenko; Ukraine | Dimitri Granjux; France | Josia Topf; Germany |
| 50 metre | S4 | Roman Zhdanov; Russia | Matz Topkin; Estonia | Andreas Ernhofer; Austria |
| 50 metre | S5 | Artem Oliinyk; Ukraine | Yaroslav Semenenko; Ukraine | Ismail Zulfic; Bosnia and Herzegovina |
| 100 metre | S1 | Anton Kol; Ukraine | Francesco Bettella; Italy | Dimitrios Karypidis; Greece |
| 100 metre | S6 | Luca da Prato; Italy | Laurent Chardard; France | Dino Sinovčić; Croatia |
| 100 metre | S7 | Maksim Baskakov; Russia | Danyil Bielyi; Ukraine | Andrii Trusov; Ukraine |
| 100 metre | S8 | Turgut Aslan Yaraman; Turkey | Iñigo Llopis Sanz; Spain | Eduard Horodianyn; Ukraine |
| 100 metre | S9 | Bogdan Mozgovoi; Russia | Simone Barlaam; Italy | Yahor Shchalkanau; Belarus |
| 100 metre | S10 | Olivier van de Voort; Netherlands | Kasper Larsen; Denmark | Riccardo Menciotti; Italy |
| 100 metre | S11 | Albert Gelis; Spain | David Kratochvil; Czech Republic | Mykhailo Serbin; Ukraine |
| 100 metre | S12 | Vladimir Sotnikov; Russia | Konstantin Burmistrov; Russia | Yauheni Kavalionak; Belarus |
| 100 metre | S13 | Thomas van Wanrooij; Netherlands | Oleksii Virchenko; Ukraine | Gabriel Steen; Norway |
| 100 metre | S14 | Alexander Hillhouse; Denmark | William Ellard; Great Britain | Vasyl Krainyk; Ukraine |

==== Breaststroke ====
| Event | | Gold | Silver | Bronze |
|---|---|---|---|---|
| 50 metre | SB2 | Igor Bobyrev; Russia | Umut Ünlü; Turkey | Iioannis Kostakis; Greece |
| 50 metre | SB3 | Andreas Ernhofer; Austria | Vicente Gil; Spain | Dimitri Granjux; France |
| 100 metre | SB4 | Dmitrii Cherniaev; Russia | Nikita Pavlov; Russia | Artem Oliinyk; Ukraine |
| 100 metre | SB5 | Kiriil Aleksandrov; Russia | Andrei Granichka; Russia | Antoni Ponce Bertran; Spain |
| 100 metre | SB6 | Yevhenii Bohodaiko; Ukraine | Thijs van Hofweegen; Netherlands | Bence Ivan; Hungary |
| 100 metre | SB7 | Kyrylo Poida; Ukraine | Turgut Aslan Yaraman; Turkey | Egor Efrosinin; Russia |
| 100 metre | SB8 | Andrei Kalina; Russia | Daniil Smirnov; Russia | Oscar Salguero Galisteo; Spain |
| 100 metre | SB9 | Hector Denayer; France | Artem Isaev; Russia | Ian Florencio Fernández; Spain |
| 100 metre | SB11 | Rogier Dorsman; Netherlands | Danylo Chufarov; Ukraine | Edgars Matakas; Lithuania |
| 100 metre | SB12 | Konstantin Burmistrov; Russia | Uladzimir Izotau; Belarus | Yauheni Kavalionak; Belarus |
| 100 metre | SB13 | Taliso Engel; Germany | Thomas van Wanrooij; Netherlands | Philip Hebmüller; Germany |
| 100 metre | SB14 | Quinn-Austin Kelly; Great Britain | Florian Reiter; Germany | Vasyl Krainyk; Ukraine |

==== Butterfly ====
| Event | | Gold | Silver | Bronze |
|---|---|---|---|---|
| 50 metre | S5 | Artem Oliinyk; Ukraine | Ismail Zulfic; Bosnia and Herzegovina | Kirill Pulver; Russia |
| 50 metre | S6 | Laurent Chardard; France | Vladyslav Koshman; Ukraine | David Sánchez Sierra; Spain |
| 100 metre | S8 | Eduard Horodianyn; Ukraine | Alberto Amodeo; Italy | Diogo Cancela; Portugal |
| 100 metre | S9 | Simone Barlaam; Italy | Jacobo Garrido Brun; Spain | Hector Denayer; France |
| 100 metre | S10 | Stefano Raimondi; Italy | Ihor Nimchenko; Ukraine | Riccardo Menciotti; Italy |
| 100 metre | S11 | David Kratochvil; Czech Republic | Danylo Chufarov; Ukraine | Mykhailo Serbin; Ukraine |
| 100 metre | S12 | Konstantin Burmistrov; Russia | Vladimir Sotnikov; Russia | Egor Kuzmin; Russia |
| 100 metre | S13 | Oleksii Virchenko; Ukraine | Enrique José Alhambra Mollar; Spain | Egor Shchitkovskii; Russia |
| 100 metre | S14 | Alexander Hillhouse; Denmark | William Ellard; Great Britain | Andrzej Kowalik; Poland |

==== Individual medley ====
| Event | | Gold | Silver | Bronze |
|---|---|---|---|---|
| 150 metre | SM3 | Dimitri Granjux; France | Josia Topf; Germany | Ismail Barlov; Bosnia and Herzegovina |
| 200 metre | SM5 | Artem Oliinyk; Ukraine | Nikita Pavlov; Russia | Antoni Ponce; Spain |
| 200 metre | SM6 | Andrei Granichka; Russia | Vladyslav Koshman; Ukraine | David Sanchez Sierra; Spain |
| 200 metre | SM8 | Turgut Aslan Yaraman; Turkey | Eduard Horodianyn; Ukraine | Diogo Cancela; Portugal |
| 200 metre | SM9 | Hector Denayer; France | Simone Barlaam; Italy | Bogdan Mozgovoi; Russia |
| 200 metre | SM10 | Stefano Raimondi; Italy | Ihor Nimchenko; Ukraine | Bas Takken; Netherlands |
| 200 metre | SM11 | David Kratochvil; Czech Republic | Rogier Dorsman; Netherlands | Danylo Chufarov; Ukraine |
| 200 metre | SM13 | Konstantin Burmistrov; Russia | Vladimir Sotnikov; Russia | Thomas van Wanrooij; Netherlands |
| 200 metre | SM14 | Alexander Hillhouse; Denmark | Rodion Berdnik; Russia | William Ellard; Great Britain |

=== Women ===
==== Freestyle ====
| Event | | Gold | Silver | Bronze |
|---|---|---|---|---|
| 50 metre | S3 | Delia Fontcuberta Cervera; Spain | Teresa Perales; Spain | Domiziana Mecenate; Italy |
| 50 metre | S4 | Tanja Scholz; Germany | Mira Larionova; Russia | Gina Böttcher; Germany |
| 50 metre | S5 | Monica Boggioni; Italy | Galina Fedurina; Russia | Agáta Koupilová; Czech Republic |
| 50 metre | S6 | Nora Meister; Switzerland | Dearbhaile Brady; Ireland | Emma Lancini; Italy |
| 50 metre | S7 | Anna Hontar; Ukraine | Veronika Korzhova; Ukraine | Leyre Orti Campos; Spain |
| 50 metre | S8 | Letizia Milesi; Italy | Viktoriia Ishchiulova; Russia | Xenia Palazzo; Italy |
| 50 metre | S9 | Florianne Bultje; Netherlands | Elena Kliachkina; Russia | Anastasiya Dmytriv; Spain |
| 50 metre | S10 | Defne Kurt; Turkey | Elizaveta Sidorenko; Russia | Callie-Ann Warrington; Great Britain |
| 50 metre | S11 | Liesette Bruinsma; Netherlands | Irene van Drimmelen; Netherlands | Kateryna Tkachuk; Ukraine |
| 50 metre | S12 | Anna Krivshina; Russia | Elena Semechin; Germany | Mariia Latritskaia; Russia |
| 50 metre | S13 | Carlotta Gilli; Italy | Marian Polo Lopez; Spain | Emma Feliu Martin; Spain |
| 100 metre | S3 | Delia Fontcuberta Cervera; Spain | Teresa Perales; Spain | Domiziana Mecenate; Italy |
| 100 metre | S4 | Gina Böttcher; Germany | Mira Larionova; Russia | Marta Fernandez Infante; Spain |
| 100 metre | S5 | Monica Boggioni; Italy | Agáta Koupilová; Czech Republic | Galina Fedurina; Russia |
| 100 metre | S6 | Giulia Terzi; Italy | Nora Meister; Switzerland | Verena Schott; Germany |
| 100 metre | S7 | Veronika Korzhova; Ukraine | Anna Bogatyreva; Russia | Anna Hontar; Ukraine |
| 100 metre | S8 | Xenia Palazzo; Italy | Nahia Zudaire; Spain | Letizia Milesi; Italy |
| 100 metre | S9 | Oliwia Jabłońska; Poland | Anastasiya Dmytriv; Spain | Florianne Bultje; Netherlands |
| 100 metre | S10 | Defne Kurt; Turkey | Callie-Ann Warrington; Great Britain | Elizaveta Sidorenko; Russia |
| 100 metre | S11 | Irene van Drimmelen; Netherlands | Liesette Bruinsma; Netherlands | Varvara Kniazeva; Russia |
| 100 metre | S12 | Maria Delgado Nadal; Spain | Anna Krivshina; Russia | Alessia Berra; Italy |
| 100 metre | S13 | Carlotta Gilli; Italy | Róisín Ní Ríain; Ireland | Emma Feliu Martin; Spain |
| 200 metre | S5 | Monica Boggioni; Italy | Agáta Koupilová; Czech Republic | Gina Boettcher; Germany |
| 200 metre | S14 | Valeriia Shabalina; Russia | Poppy Maskill; Great Britain | Tara Beard; Great Britain |
| 400 metre | S6 | Nora Meister; Switzerland | Verena Schott; Germany | Emma Lancini; Italy |
| 400 metre | S7 | Veronika Korzhova; Ukraine | Anna Bogatyreva; Russia | Leyre Orti Campos; Spain |
| 400 metre | S8 | Xenia Palazzo; Italy | Nahia Zudaire Borrezo; Spain | Mariia Pavlova; Russia |
| 400 metre | S9 | Oliwia Jablonska; Poland | Emma Mečić; Croatia | Zsófia Konkoly; Hungary |
| 400 metre | S10 | Bianka Pap; Hungary | Csenge Hotz; Hungary | Virag Cenge Janza; Hungary |
| 400 metre | S13 | Carlotta Gilli; Italy | Emma Feliu Martin; Spain | Sofiia Mezhinskaia; Russia |

==== Backstroke ====
| Event | | Gold | Silver | Bronze |
|---|---|---|---|---|
| 50 metre | S2 | Teresa Perales; Spain | Angela Procida; Italy | Anhelina Maltseva; Ukraine |
| 50 metre | S3 | Domiziana Mecenate; Italy | Zoia Shchurova; Russia | Wiktoria Sobota; Poland |
| 50 metre | S4 | Mira Larionova; Russia | Tanja Scholz; Germany | Anastasiia Goncharova; Russia |
| 50 metre | S5 | Sevilay Öztürk; Turkey | Esra Yüce; Turkey | Monica Boggioni; Italy |
| 100 metre | S2 | Angela Procida; Italy | Teresa Perales; Spain | Anhelina Maltseva; Ukraine |
| 100 metre | S6 | Nora Meister; Switzerland | Verena Schott; Germany | Emma Lancini; Italy |
| 100 metre | S7 | Veronika Korzhova; Ukraine | Anna Hontar; Ukraine | Leyre Orti Campos; Spain |
| 100 metre | S8 | Viktoriia Ishchiulova; Russia | Mira Jeanne Maack; Germany | Alexandra Ema Borská; Czech Republic |
| 100 metre | S9 | Beatriz Lerida Maldonado; Spain | Zsofia Konkoly; Hungary | Emma Memic; Croatia |
| 100 metre | S10 | Defne Kurt; Turkey | Bianka Pap; Hungary | Callie-Ann Warrington; Great Britain |
| 100 metre | S11 | Varvara Kniazeva; Russia | Irene van Drimmelen; Netherlands | Anastasiia Shevchenko; Russia |
| 100 metre | S13 | Róisín Ní Ríain; Ireland | Carlotta Gilli; Italy | Ursula Carroll; Great Britain |
| 100 metre | S14 | Poppy Maskill; Great Britain | Valeriia Shabalina; Russia | Olivia Newman-Baronius; Great Britain |

==== Breaststroke ====
| Event | | Gold | Silver | Bronze |
|---|---|---|---|---|
| 50 metre | SB2 | Tanja Scholz; Germany | Diana Koltsova; Russia | Teresa Perales; Spain |
| 50 metre | SB3 | Monica Boggioni; Italy | Mira Larionova; Russia | Maryna Verbova; Ukraine |
| 100 metre | SB4 | Galine Fedurina; Russia | Giulia Ghiretti; Italy | Fanni Illés; Hungary |
| 100 metre | SB5 | Verena Schott; Germany | Aitana Estrada; Spain | Nisanur Kocabaş; Germany |
| 100 metre | SB6 | Veronika Korzhova; Ukraine | Evelin Szaraz; Hungary | Dearbhaile Brady; Ireland |
| 100 metre | SB7 | Mariia Pavlova; Russia | Letizia Milesi; Italy | Nahia Zudaire Borrezo; Spain |
| 100 metre | SB9 | Elizaveta Sidorenko; Russia | Anastasiya Dmytriv; Spain (S8) | Lisa Kruger; Netherlands |
| 100 metre | SB13 | Elena Semechin; Russia (SB12) | Sofiia Mezhinskaya; Russia | Anastasiya Zudzilava; Belarus |
| 100 metre | SB14 | Aaliyah Richards; Great Britain | Olivia Newman-Baronius; Great Britain | Tara Beard; Great Britain |

==== Butterfly ====
| Event | | Gold | Silver | Bronze |
|---|---|---|---|---|
| 50 metre | S5 | Sevilay Ozturk; Turkey | Esra Yuce; Turkey | Galina Fedurina; Russia |
| 50 metre | S6 | Giulia Terzi; Italy | Dearbhaile Brady; Ireland | Verena Schott; Germany |
| 50 metre | S7 | Milana Shchelokova; Russia | Veronika Korzhova; Ukraine | Anna Hontar; Ukraine |
| 100 metre | S8 | Viktoriia Ishchiulova; Russia | Nahia Zudaire Borrezo; Spain | Alzbeta Kubova; Slovakia |
| 100 metre | S9 | Zsofia Konkoly; Hungary | Florianne Bultje; Netherlands | Oliwia Jablonska; Poland |
| 100 metre | S10 | Defne Kurt; Turkey | Csenge Hotz; Hungary | Callie-Ann Warrington; Great Britain |
| 100 metre | S13 | Carlotta Gilli; Italy | María Delgado; Spain (S12) | Marian Polo López; Spain |
| 100 metre | S14 | Olivia Newman-Baronius; Great Britain | Valeriia Shabalina; Russia | Poppy Maskill; Great Britain |

==== Individual medley ====
| Event | | Gold | Silver | Bronze |
|---|---|---|---|---|
| 150 metre | SM4 | Tanja Scholz; Germany | Mira Larionova; Russia | Gina Boettcher; Germany |
| 200 metre | SM5 | Galina Fedurina; Russia | Monica Boggioni; Italy | Giulia Ghiretti; Italy |
| 200 metre | SM6 | Verena Schott; Germany | Dearbhaile Brady; Ireland | Aitana Estrada Chavez; Spain |
| 200 metre | SM7 | Veronika Korzhova; Ukraine | Milana Shchelokova; Russia | Anna Hontar; Ukraine |
| 200 metre | SM8 | Viktoriia Ishchiulova; Russia | Paula Novina; Croatia | Mira Jeanne Maack; Germany |
| 200 metre | SM9 | Oliwia Jablonska; Poland | Anastasiya Dmytriv; Spain | Zsófia Konkoly; Hungary |
| 200 metre | SM10 | Defne Kurt; Turkey | Bianka Pap; Hungary | Lisa Kruger; Netherlands |
| 200 metre | SM11 | Liesette Bruinsma; Netherlands | Varvara Knazieva; Russia | Sonja Alexandra Hampf; Finland |
| 200 metre | SM13 | Carlotta Gilli; Italy | Róisín Ní Ríain; Ireland | Sofiia Mezhinskaia; Russia |
| 200 metre | SM14 | Valeriia Shabalina; Russia | Poppy Maskill; Great Britain | Aaliyah Richards; Great Britain |

=== Mixed ===
==== Freestyle ====
| Event | | Gold | Silver | Bronze |
|---|---|---|---|---|
| 4 × 50 metre | 20 pts | Russia; Mikhail Evseenko; Galina Fedurina; Mira Larionova; Kirill Pulver | Ukraine; Hanna Polishchuk; Denys Ostapchenko; Artem Oliinyk; Anna Hontar | Italy; Giulia Terzi; Gabriele Lorenzo; Monica Boggioni; Francesco Bocciardo |
| 4 × 100 metre | 34 pts | Italy; Vittoria Bianco; Tommaso Morandi; Xenia Palazzo; Simone Barlaam | Spain; Nahia Zudaire Borrezo; Iñigo Llopis Sanz; Anastasiya Dmytriv; Jacobo Garrido Brun | Russia; Denis Tarasov; Mariia Pavlova; Elena Kliachkina; Andrei Nikolaev |

==== Medley ====
| Event | | Gold | Silver | Bronze |
|---|---|---|---|---|
| 4 × 50 metre | 20 pts | Russia; Roman Zhdanov; Kirill Aleksandrov; Milana Shchelokova; Mira Larionova | Italy; Luca da Prato; Monica Boggioni; Giulia Terzi; Francesco Bocciardo | Ukraine; Yaroslav Semenenko; Maryna Verbova; Veronika Korzhova; Artem Oliinyk |
| 4 × 100 metre | 34 pts | Spain | Russia | Italy |
