= 2023 World Para Swimming Championships – Women's 100 metre backstroke =

2023 Women World Para Swimming Championships

The women's 100m backstroke events at the 2023 World Para Swimming Championships were held at the Manchester Aquatics Centre between 31 July and 6 August.

== Medalists ==
Event	Gold	Silver	Bronze
S2	Yip Pin Xiu; Singapore	Angela Procida; Italy	Fabiola Ramírez Martínez; Mexico
S6	Shelby Newkirk; Canada	Jiang Yuyan; China	Anna Hontar; Ukraine
S7	Danielle Dorris; Canada	Julia Gaffney; United States	Veronika Korzhova; Ukraine
S8	Alice Tai; Great Britain	Xenia Palazzo; Italy	Tupou Neiufi; New Zealand
S9	Christie Raleigh-Crossley; United States	Nuria Marques Soto; Spain	Mariana Ribeiro; Brazil
S10	Bianka Pap; Hungary	Lisa Kruger; Netherlands	Anaëlle Roulet; France
S11	Wang Xinyi; China	Cai Liwen; China	Analuz Pellitero; Argentina
S12	Maria Carolina Gomes Santiago; Brazil	Jenna Jones; Australia	María Delgado; Spain
S13	Róisín Ní Ríain; Ireland	Carlotta Gilli; Italy	Katja Dedekind; Australia
S14	Bethany Firth; Great Britain	Poppy Maskill; Great Britain	Georgia Sheffield; Great Britain

== Results ==
=== S6 ===
Final

Eight swimmers from eight nations took part.

Rank	Name	Nation	Result	Notes
1st place, gold medalist(s)	Shelby Newkirk	Canada	1:20.62	CR
2nd place, silver medalist(s)	Anna Hontar	China	1:21.18	
3rd place, bronze medalist(s)	Jiang Yuyan	Ukraine	1:22.34	
4	Verena Schott	Germany	1:22.51	
5	Elizabeth Marks	United States	1:22.72	
6	Grace Harvey	United Kingdom	1:29.36	
7	Natalya Zvyagintseva	Kazakhstan	1:34.01	
8	Ng Cheuk Yin	Hong Kong	1:35.39	

=== S12 ===
Final

Eight swimmers from eight nations took part.

Rank	Name	Nation	Result	Notes
1st place, gold medalist(s)	Maria Carolina Gomes Santiago	Brazil	1:08.89	
2nd place, silver medalist(s)	Jenna Jones	Australia	1:12.27	OC
3rd place, bronze medalist(s)	Maria Delgado Nadal	Spain	1:12.65	
4	Karina Petrikovičová	Slovakia	1:15.18	
5	Léane Morceau	France	1:15.74	
6	Yaryna Matlo	Ukraine	1:20.72	
7	Neele Labudda	Germany	1:22.13	
8	Sophie Jin Wen Soon	Singapore	1:29.23	

=== S13 ===
Final

Six swimmers from six nations took part. The event progressed straight to final on 3 August.

The applicable records entering the event where as follows:

Caption
Records	Swimmer	Time
World record	Gia Pergolini (United States)	1:04.64
Championships record	Gia Pergolini (United States)	1:04.80

Rank	Name	Nation	Result	Notes
1st place, gold medalist(s)	Róisín Ní Ríain	Ireland	1:06.62	
2nd place, silver medalist(s)	Carlotta Gilli	Italy	1:06.71	
3rd place, bronze medalist(s)	Katja Dedekind	Australia	1:06.98	
4	Emma Feliu	Spain	1:14.09	
5	Danika Vyncke	South Africa	1:24.34	
	Colleen Young	United States	DSQ	
