= Denayer =

Denayer is a surname. Notable people with the surname include:

- Félix Denayer (born 1990), Belgian field hockey player
- Hector Denayer (born 2005), French Paralympic swimmer
- Jason Denayer (born 1995), Belgian footballer
