= Swimming at the 2024 Summer Paralympics =

Swimming at the XVII Paralympic Games
- Paralympic Swimming
- Venue: La Défense Arena
- Dates: 29 August to 7 September 2024
- Competitors: 605 from 72 nations

Swimming at the 2024 Summer Paralympics in Paris, France took place between 29 August and 7 September 2024. There were 71 male, 64 female and 6 mixed open relays, this was five fewer events than in the 2020 Summer Paralympics. Medals are awarded to top finishers in each disability classification.

== Qualification ==
Qualification took place from 1 October 2022 to 31 January 2024.

== Schedule ==
The event schedule was announced in February 2023.

== Medal table ==
* Host nation (France)

| Rank | Nation | Gold | Silver | Bronze | Total |
|---|---|---|---|---|---|
| 1 | China | 22 | 21 | 11 | 54 |
| 2 | Great Britain | 18 | 8 | 6 | 32 |
| – | Neutral Paralympic Athletes | 16 | 14 | 11 | 41 |
| 3 | Italy | 16 | 6 | 15 | 37 |
| 4 | United States | 10 | 17 | 3 | 30 |
| 5 | Ukraine | 8 | 15 | 17 | 40 |
| 6 | Brazil | 7 | 9 | 10 | 26 |
| 7 | Australia | 6 | 8 | 13 | 27 |
| 8 | Canada | 5 | 4 | 4 | 13 |
| 9 | Netherlands | 5 | 3 | 2 | 10 |
| 10 | Germany | 4 | 3 | 3 | 10 |
| 11 | Japan | 3 | 3 | 6 | 12 |
| 12 | Hungary | 3 | 3 | 1 | 7 |
| 13 | France* | 2 | 6 | 6 | 14 |
| 14 | Spain | 2 | 4 | 9 | 15 |
| 15 | Israel | 2 | 1 | 2 | 5 |
| 16 | Turkey | 2 | 0 | 1 | 3 |
| 17 | Poland | 2 | 0 | 0 | 2 |
| 17 | Singapore | 2 | 0 | 0 | 2 |
| 19 | Mexico | 1 | 3 | 3 | 7 |
| 20 | Czech Republic | 1 | 1 | 2 | 4 |
| 21 | Greece | 1 | 1 | 0 | 2 |
| 21 | Switzerland | 1 | 1 | 0 | 2 |
| 23 | Argentina | 1 | 0 | 1 | 2 |
| 24 | Denmark | 1 | 0 | 0 | 1 |
| 25 | Colombia | 0 | 5 | 1 | 6 |
| 26 | Azerbaijan | 0 | 1 | 3 | 4 |
| 27 | Cyprus | 0 | 1 | 1 | 2 |
| 27 | Hong Kong | 0 | 1 | 1 | 2 |
| 27 | Ireland | 0 | 1 | 1 | 2 |
| 30 | Bosnia and Herzegovina | 0 | 1 | 0 | 1 |
| 30 | Kazakhstan | 0 | 1 | 0 | 1 |
| 32 | Chile | 0 | 0 | 3 | 3 |
| 33 | Croatia | 0 | 0 | 1 | 1 |
| 33 | Norway | 0 | 0 | 1 | 1 |
| 33 | Portugal | 0 | 0 | 1 | 1 |
| 33 | Uzbekistan | 0 | 0 | 1 | 1 |
| Totals (36 entries) | | 141 | 142 | 140 | 423 |

== Medalists ==
=== Men ===
Freestyle

| Event | Class | Gold | Silver | Bronze |
|---|---|---|---|---|
| 50 m | S3 | Umut Ünlü; Turkey | Denys Ostapchenko; Ukraine | Josia Topf; Germany |
| 50 m | S4 | Sebastian Massabie; Canada | Takayuki Suzuki; Japan | Ami Omer Dadaon; Israel |
| 50 m | S5 | Guo Jincheng; China | Yuan Weiyi; China | Wang Lichao; China |
| 50 m | S7 | Andrii Trusov; Ukraine | Carlos Serrano Zárate; Colombia | Egor Efrosinin; Neutral Paralympic Athletes |
| 50 m | S9 | Simone Barlaam; Italy | Denis Tarasov; Neutral Paralympic Athletes | Fredrik Solberg; Norway |
| 50 m | S10 | Thomas Gallagher; Australia | Phelipe Rodrigues; Brazil | Rowan Crothers; Australia |
| 50 m | S11 | Keiichi Kimura; Japan | Hua Dongdong; China | none awarded (as there was a tie for silver) |
| 50 m | S11 | Keiichi Kimura; Japan | Wendell Belarmino; Brazil | none awarded (as there was a tie for silver) |
| 50 m | S13 | Ihar Boki; Neutral Paralympic Athletes | Illia Yaremenko; Ukraine | Oleksii Virchenko; Ukraine |
| 100 m | S4 | Ami Omer Dadaon; Israel | Takayuki Suzuki; Japan | Angel de Jesus Camacho Ramirez; Mexico |
| 100 m | S5 | Oleksandr Komarov; Ukraine | Guo Jincheng; China | Kirill Pulver; Neutral Paralympic Athletes |
| 100 m | S6 | Antonio Fantin; Italy | Talisson Glock; Brazil | Laurent Chardard; France |
| 100 m | S8 | Callum Simpson; Australia | Noah Jaffe; United States | Alberto Amodeo; Italy |
| 100 m | S10 | Stefano Raimondi; Italy | Rowan Crothers; Australia | Thomas Gallagher; Australia |
| 100 m | S12 | Yaroslav Denysenko; Ukraine | Maksym Veraksa; Ukraine | Raman Salei; Azerbaijan |
| 200 m | S2 | Gabriel Araújo; Brazil | Vladimir Danilenko; Neutral Paralympic Athletes | Alberto Abarza; Chile |
| 200 m | S3 | Umut Ünlü; Turkey | Denys Ostapchenko; Ukraine | Serhii Palamarchuk; Ukraine |
| 200 m | S4 | Ami Omer Dadaon; Israel | Roman Zhdanov; Neutral Paralympic Athletes | Takayuki Suzuki; Japan |
| 200 m | S5 | Francesco Bocciardo; Italy | Kirill Pulver; Neutral Paralympic Athletes | Oleksandr Komarov; Ukraine |
| 200 m | S14 | William Ellard; Great Britain | Nicholas Bennett; Canada | Jack Ireland; Australia |
| 400 m | S6 | Talisson Glock; Brazil | Antonio Fantin; Italy | Jesús Alberto Gutiérrez Bermúdez; Mexico |
| 400 m | S7 | Federico Bicelli; Italy | Andrii Trusov; Ukraine | Iñaki Basiloff; Argentina |
| 400 m | S8 | Alberto Amodeo; Italy | Reid Maxwell; Canada | Andrei Nikolaev; Neutral Paralympic Athletes |
| 400 m | S9 | Ugo Didier; France | Simone Barlaam; Italy | Brenden Hall; Australia |
| 400 m | S11 | David Kratochvil; Czech Republic | Rogier Dorsman; Netherlands | Uchu Tomita; Japan |
| 400 m | S13 | Ihar Boki; Neutral Paralympic Athletes | Alex Portal; France | Kylian Portal; France |

Backstroke

| Event | Class | Gold | Silver | Bronze |
|---|---|---|---|---|
| 50 m | S1 | Kamil Otowski; Poland | Francesco Bettella; Italy | Anton Kol; Ukraine |
| 50 m | S2 | Gabriel Araújo; Brazil | Vladimir Danilenko; Neutral Paralympic Athletes | Alberto Abarza; Chile |
| 50 m | S3 | Denys Ostapchenko; Ukraine | Josia Topf; Germany | Serhii Palamarchuk; Ukraine |
| 50 m | S4 | Roman Zhdanov; Neutral Paralympic Athletes | Ángel de Jesús Camacho Ramírez; Mexico | Arnošt Petráček; Czech Republic |
| 50 m | S5 | Yuan Weiyi; China | Guo Jincheng; China | Wang Lichao; China |
| 100 m | S1 | Kamil Otowski; Poland | Anton Kol; Ukraine | Francesco Bettella; Italy |
| 100 m | S2 | Gabriel Araújo; Brazil | Vladimir Danilenko; Neutral Paralympic Athletes | Alberto Abarza; Chile |
| 100 m | S6 | Yang Hong; China | Wang Jingang; China | Dino Sinovčić; Croatia |
| 100 m | S7 | Yurii Shenhur; Ukraine | Andrii Trusov; Ukraine | Federico Bicelli; Italy |
| 100 m | S8 | Iñigo Llopis Sanz; Spain | Kota Kubota; Japan | Mark Malyar; Israel |
| 100 m | S9 | Yahor Shchalkanau; Neutral Paralympic Athletes | Ugo Didier; France | Bogdan Mozgovoi; Neutral Paralympic Athletes |
| 100 m | S10 | Olivier van de Voort; Netherlands | Stefano Raimondi; Italy | Thomas Gallagher; Australia |
| 100 m | S11 | Mykhailo Serbin; Ukraine | David Kratochvil; Czech Republic | Danylo Chufarov; Ukraine |
| 100 m | S12 | Stephen Clegg; Great Britain | Raman Salei; Azerbaijan | Iaroslav Denysenko; Ukraine |
| 100 m | S13 | Ihar Boki; Neutral Paralympic Athletes | Vladimir Sotnikov; Neutral Paralympic Athletes | Alex Portal; France |
| 100 m | S14 | Benjamin Hance; Australia | Gabriel Bandeira; Brazil | Mark Tompsett; Great Britain |

Breaststroke

| Event | Class | Gold | Silver | Bronze |
|---|---|---|---|---|
| 50 m | SB2 | Arnulfo Castorena; Mexico | Ismail Barlov; Bosnia and Herzegovina | Grant Patterson; Australia |
| 50 m | SB3 | Takayuki Suzuki; Japan | Efrem Morelli; Italy | Miguel Luque; Spain |
| 100 m | SB4 | Dmitrii Cherniaev; Neutral Paralympic Athletes | Antonios Tsapatakis; Greece | Manuel Bortuzzo; Italy |
| 100 m | SB5 | Leo McCrea; Switzerland | Antoni Ponce Bertran; Spain | Danylo Semenykhin; Ukraine |
| 100 m | SB6 | Yang Hong; China | Nelson Crispín; Colombia | Ievgenii Bogodaiko; Ukraine |
| 100 m | SB8 | Andrei Kalina; Neutral Paralympic Athletes | Yang Guanglong; China | Carlos Serrano Zárate; Colombia |
| 100 m | SB9 | Stefano Raimondi; Italy | Hector Denayer; France | Maurice Wetekam; Germany |
| 100 m | SB11 | Rogier Dorsman; Netherlands | Yang Bozun; China | Danylo Chufarov; Ukraine |
| 100 m | SB13 | Taliso Engel; Germany | Nurdaulet Zhumagali; Kazakhstan | Vali Israfilov; Azerbaijan |
| 100 m | SB14 | Nicholas Bennett; Canada | Jake Michel; Australia | Naohide Yamaguchi; Japan |

Butterfly

| Event | Class | Gold | Silver | Bronze |
|---|---|---|---|---|
| 50 m | S5 | Guo Jincheng; China | Yuan Weiyi; China | Wang Lichao; China |
| 50 m | S6 | Wang Jingang; China | Nelson Crispín; Colombia | Laurent Chardard; France |
| 50 m | S7 | Andrii Trusov; Ukraine | Carlos Serrano Zárate; Colombia | Egor Efrosinin; Neutral Paralympic Athletes |
| 100 m | S8 | Alberto Amodeo; Italy | Wu Hongliang; China | Yang Guanglong; China |
| 100 m | S9 | Simone Barlaam; Italy | Timothy Hodge; Australia | Lewis Bishop; Australia |
| 100 m | S10 | Stefano Raimondi; Italy | Ihor Nimchenko; Ukraine | Alex Saffy; Australia |
| 100 m | S11 | Keiichi Kimura; Japan | Danylo Chufarov; Ukraine | Uchu Tomita; Japan |
| 100 m | S12 | Stephen Clegg; Great Britain | Dzmitry Salei; Neutral Paralympic Athletes | Raman Salei; Azerbaijan |
| 100 m | S13 | Ihar Boki; Neutral Paralympic Athletes | Alex Portal; France | Enrique José Alhambra Mollar; Spain |
| 100 m | S14 | Alexander Hillhouse; Denmark | William Ellard; Great Britain | Gabriel Bandeira; Brazil |

Individual medley

| Event | Class | Gold | Silver | Bronze |
|---|---|---|---|---|
| 150 m | SM3 | Josia Topf; Germany | Ahmed Kelly; Australia | Grant Patterson; Australia |
| 150 m | SM4 | Roman Zhdanov; Neutral Paralympic Athletes | Ami Omer Dadaon; Israel | Angel de Jesus Camacho Ramirez; Mexico |
| 200 m | SM6 | Yang Hong; China WR | Nelson Crispín; Colombia | Talisson Glock; Brazil |
| 200 m | SM7 | Iñaki Basiloff; Argentina | Andrii Trusov; Ukraine | Ievgenii Bogodaiko; Ukraine |
| 200 m | SM8 | Xu Haijiao; China | Yang Guanglong; China | Diogo Cancela; Portugal |
| 200 m | SM9 | Timothy Hodge; Australia | Ugo Didier; France | Hector Denayer; France |
| 200 m | SM10 | Stefano Raimondi; Italy | Col Pearse; Australia | Ihor Nimchenko; Ukraine |
| 200 m | SM11 | Rogier Dorsman; Netherlands | Danylo Chufarov; Ukraine | David Kratochvil; Czech Republic |
| 200 m | SM13 | Ihar Boki; Neutral Paralympic Athletes | Alex Portal; France | Vladimir Sotnikov; Neutral Paralympic Athletes |
| 200 m | SM14 | Nicholas Bennett; Canada | Rhys Darbey; Great Britain | Ricky Betar; Australia |

=== Women ===
Freestyle

| Event | Class | Gold | Silver | Bronze |
|---|---|---|---|---|
| 50 m | S4 | Leanne Smith; United States | Tanja Scholz; Germany | Rachael Watson; Australia |
| 50 m | S6 | Jiang Yuyan; China | Ellie Marks; United States | Anna Hontar; Ukraine |
| 50 m | S8 | Alice Tai; Great Britain | Cecília Jerônimo de Araújo; Brazil | Viktoriia Ishchiulova; Neutral Paralympic Athletes |
| 50 m | S10 | Chen Yi; China | Christie Raleigh Crossley; United States | Aurélie Rivard; Canada |
| 50 m | S11 | Ma Jia; China | Karolina Pelendritou; Cyprus | Maryna Piddubna; Ukraine |
| 50 m | S13 | Carol Santiago; Brazil | Gia Pergolini; United States | Carlotta Gilli; Italy |
| 100 m | S3 | Leanne Smith; United States | Marta Fernández Infante; Spain | Rachael Watson; Australia |
| 100 m | S5 | Tully Kearney; Great Britain | Iryna Poida; Ukraine | Monica Boggioni; Italy |
| 100 m | S7 | Jiang Yuyan; China | Morgan Stickney; United States | Giulia Terzi; Italy |
| 100 m | S9 | Alexa Leary; Australia | Christie Raleigh-Crossley; United States | Mariana Ribeiro; Brazil |
| 100 m | S10 | Emeline Pierre; France | Aurelie Rivard; Canada | Alessia Scortechini; Italy |
| 100 m | S11 | Daria Lukianenko; Neutral Paralympic Athletes | Liesette Bruinsma; Netherlands | Zhang Xiaotong; China |
| 100 m | S12 | Carol Santiago; Brazil | Anna Stetsenko; Ukraine | Ayano Tsujiuchi; Japan |
| 200 m | S5 | Tully Kearney; Great Britain | Iryna Poida; Ukraine | Monica Boggioni; Italy |
| 200 m | S14 | Valeriia Shabalina; Neutral Paralympic Athletes | Poppy Maskill; Great Britain | Louise Fiddes; Great Britain |
| 400 m | S6 | Jiang Yuyan; China | Nora Meister; Switzerland | Maisie Summers-Newton; Great Britain |
| 400 m | S7 | Morgan Stickney; United States | McKenzie Coan; United States | Giulia Terzi; Italy |
| 400 m | S8 | Jessica Long; United States | Alice Tai; Great Britain | Xenia Palazzo; Italy |
| 400 m | S9 | Zsófia Konkoly; Hungary | Lakeisha Patterson; Australia | Vittoria Bianco; Italy |
| 400 m | S10 | Aurélie Rivard; Canada | Alexandra Truwit; United States | Bianka Pap; Hungary |
| 400 m | S11 | Liesette Bruinsma; Netherlands | Zhang Xiaotong; China | Daria Lukianenko; Neutral Paralympic Athletes |
| 400 m | S13 | Olivia Chambers; United States | Carlotta Gilli; Italy | Anna Stetsenko; Ukraine |

Backstroke

| Event | Class | Gold | Silver | Bronze |
|---|---|---|---|---|
| 50 m | S2 | Yip Pin Xiu; Singapore | Haideé Aceves; Mexico | Teresa Perales; Spain |
| 50 m | S3 | Ellie Challis; Great Britain | Zoia Shchurova; Neutral Paralympic Athletes | Marta Fernández Infante; Spain |
| 50 m | S4 | Alexandra Stamatopoulou; Greece | Gina Böttcher; Germany | Lídia Vieira da Cruz; Brazil |
| 50 m | S5 | Lu Dong; China | He Shenggao; China | Liu Yu; China |
| 100 m | S2 | Yip Pin Xiu; Singapore | Haideé Aceves; Mexico | Angela Procida; Italy |
| 100 m | S6 | Jiang Yuyan; China | Ellie Marks; United States | Shelby Newkirk; Canada |
| 100 m | S8 | Alice Tai; Great Britain | Viktoriia Ishchiulova; Neutral Paralympic Athletes | Mira Jeanne Maack; Germany |
| 100 m | S9 | Christie Raleigh-Crossley; United States | Núria Marquès Soto; Spain | Mariana Ribeiro; Brazil |
| 100 m | S10 | Bianka Pap; Hungary | Alexandra Truwit; United States | Emeline Pierre; France |
| 100 m | S11 | Cai Liwen; China | Li Guizhi; China | Daria Lukianenko; Neutral Paralympic Athletes |
| 100 m | S12 | Carol Santiago; Brazil | Anna Stetsenko; Ukraine | María Delgado Nadal; Spain |
| 100 m | S13 | Gia Pergolini; United States | Roisin Ni Riain; Ireland | Carlotta Gilli; Italy |
| 100 m | S14 | Poppy Maskill; Great Britain | Valeriia Shabalina; Neutral Paralympic Athletes | Olivia Newman-Baronius; Great Britain |

Breaststroke

| Event | Class | Gold | Silver | Bronze |
|---|---|---|---|---|
| 50 m | SB3 | Monica Boggioni; Italy | Patrícia Pereira; Brazil | Marta Fernández Infante; Spain |
| 100 m | SB4 | Giulia Ghiretti; Italy | Fanni Illés; Hungary | Cheng Jiao; China |
| 100 m | SB5 | Grace Harvey; Great Britain | Zhang Li; China | Anna Hontar; Ukraine |
| 100 m | SB6 | Maisie Summers-Newton; Great Britain | Liu Daomin; China | Ng Cheuk-yan; Hong Kong |
| 100 m | SB7 | Mariia Pavlova; Neutral Paralympic Athletes | Iona Winnifrith; Great Britain | Tess Routliffe; Canada |
| 100 m | SB8 | Anastasiya Dmytriv; Spain | Brock Whiston; Great Britain | Viktoriia Ishchiulova; Neutral Paralympic Athletes |
| 100 m | SB9 | Chantalle Zijderveld; Netherlands | Zhang Meng; China | Lisa Kruger; Netherlands |
| 100 m | SB11 | Daria Lukianenko; Neutral Paralympic Athletes | Ma Jia; China | Karolina Pelendritou; Cyprus |
| 100 m | SB12 | Elena Krawzow; Germany | Carol Santiago; Brazil | Zheng Jietong; China |
| 100 m | SB13 | Rebecca Redfern; Great Britain | Olivia Chambers; United States | Colleen Young; United States |
| 100 m | SB14 | Louise Fiddes; Great Britain | Débora Carneiro; Brazil | Beatriz Carneiro; Brazil |

Butterfly

| Event | Class | Gold | Silver | Bronze |
|---|---|---|---|---|
| 50 m | S5 | Lu Dong; China | He Shenggao; China | Sevilay Öztürk; Turkey |
| 50 m | S6 | Jiang Yuyan; China | Liu Daomin; China | Mayara Petzold; Brazil |
| 50 m | S7 | Danielle Dorris; Canada | Mallory Weggemann; United States | Giulia Terzi; Italy |
| 100 m | S8 | Jessica Long; United States | Viktoriia Ishchiulova; Neutral Paralympic Athletes | Alice Tai; Great Britain |
| 100 m | S9 | Christie Raleigh-Crossley; United States | Zsófia Konkoly; Hungary | Emily Beecroft; Australia |
| 100 m | S10 | Faye Rogers; Great Britain | Callie-Ann Warrington; Great Britain | Katie Cosgriffe; Canada |
| 100 m | S13 | Carlotta Gilli; Italy | Grace Nuhfer; United States | Muslima Odilova; Uzbekistan |
| 100 m | S14 | Poppy Maskill; Great Britain | Chan Yui-lam; Hong Kong | Valeriia Shabalina; Neutral Paralympic Athletes |

Individual medley

| Event | Class | Gold | Silver | Bronze |
|---|---|---|---|---|
| 150 m | SM4 | Tanja Scholz; Germany | Nataliia Butkova; Neutral Paralympic Athletes | Lídia Vieira da Cruz; Brazil |
| 200 m | SM5 | He Shenggao; China | Lu Dong; China | Cheng Jiao; China |
| 200 m | SM6 | Maisie Summers-Newton; Great Britain | Ellie Marks; United States | Liu Daomin; China |
| 200 m | SM7 | Mallory Weggemann; United States | Tess Routliffe; Canada | Julia Gaffney; United States |
| 200 m | SM8 | Brock Whiston; Great Britain | Viktoriia Ishchiulova; Neutral Paralympic Athletes | Alice Tai; Great Britain |
| 200 m | SM9 | Zsófia Konkoly; Hungary | Núria Marquès Soto; Spain | Anastasiya Dmytriv; Spain |
| 200 m | SM10 | Zhang Meng; China | Bianka Pap; Hungary | Lisa Kruger; Netherlands |
| 200 m | SM11 | Daria Lukianenko; Neutral Paralympic Athletes | Ma Jia; China | Cai Liwen; China |
| 200 m | SM13 | Carlotta Gilli; Italy | Olivia Chambers; United States | Róisín Ní Ríain; Ireland |
| 200 m | SM14 | Valeriia Shabalina; Neutral Paralympic Athletes | Poppy Maskill; Great Britain | Aira Kinoshita; Japan |

=== Mixed relays ===
| Event | Class | Gold | Silver | Bronze |
|---|---|---|---|---|
| 4 x 50 m | Freestyle 20pts | China WR; Peng Qiuping; Yuan Weiyi; Jiang Yuyan; Guo Jincheng; Wang Lichao*; He Shenggao*; Lu Dong* | United States; Abbas Karimi; Elizabeth Marks; Zachary Shattuck; Leanne Smith | Brazil; Talisson Glock; Patrícia Pereira; Lídia Vieira da Cruz; Daniel Xavier; Samuel de Oliveira* |
| 4 x 50 m | Medley 20pts | China WR; Lu Dong; Zhang Li; Wang Lichao; Guo Jincheng; Zou Liankang*; Yao Cuan*; Wang Jingang*; Jiang Yuyan* | United States; Elizabeth Marks; Morgan Ray; Abbas Karimi; Leanne Smith | Ukraine; Yaroslav Semenenko; Anna Hontar; Oleksandr Komarov; Iryna Poida; Denys Ostapchenko*; Veronika Korzhova* |
| 4 x 100 m | S14 | Great Britain; William Ellard; Rhys Darbey; Poppy Maskill; Olivia Newman-Baronius | Australia; Jack Ireland; Madeleine McTernan; Ruby Storm; Benjamin Hance | Brazil; Arthur Xavier; Gabriel Bandeira; Beatriz Carneiro; Ana Karolina Soares |
| 4 x 100 m | VI 49pts | Ukraine; Maryna Piddubna; Oleksii Virchenko; Anna Stetsenko; Yaroslav Denysenko | Brazil; Matheus Rheine; Douglas Matera; Lucilene da Silva Sousa; Carol Santiago | Spain; José Ramón Cantero Elvira; Maria Delgado Nadal; Emma Feliu Martin; Enrique José Alhambra Mollar |
| 4 x 100 m | Freestyle 34pts | Italy WR; Stefano Raimondi; Giulia Terzi; Xenia Palazzo; Simone Barlaam | Australia; Alexa Leary; Callum Simpson; Chloe Osborn; Rowan Crothers | United States; Matthew Torres; Noah Jaffe; Natalie Sims; Christie Raleigh-Crossley |
| 4 x 100 m | Medley 34pts | Australia; Jesse Aungles; Timothy Hodge; Emily Beecroft; Alexa Leary; Keira Stephens; Callum Simpson | Netherlands; Olivier van de Voort; Chantalle Zijderveld; Florianne Bultje; Thijs van Hofweegen | Spain; Núria Marquès Soto; Oscar Salguero Galisteo; Iñigo Llopis Sanz; Sarai Gascon; Anastasiya Dmytriv; José Antonio Mari |

== See also ==
- Swimming at the 2024 Summer Olympics
