= Dearbhaile Brady =

Para swimmer representing Ireland

Personal information
- Nationality: Irish
- Born: 17 June 2007 (age 19)
- Home town: Feeny, Northern Ireland

Sport
- Sport: Para swimming
- Disability: Hypochondroplasia
- Disability class: S6
- Club: Limavady Swim Club
Medal record
Women's para swimming
Representing Ireland
World Championships
Silver medal – second place	2025 Singapore	50 m butterfly S6
Bronze medal – third place	2025 Singapore	50 m freestyle S6
European Championships
Silver medal – second place	2026 Kocaeli	200 m ind. medley SM6
Silver medal – second place	2026 Kocaeli	50m freestyle S6
Silver medal – second place	2026 Kocaeli	50m butterfly S6
Bronze medal – third place	2024 Funchal	50 m freestyle S6
Bronze medal – third place	2026 Kocaeli	100m Breaststroke S6

Dearbhaile Brady is a para swimmer from Northern Ireland. She represented Ireland at the 2024 Summer Paralympics.

== Career ==
In April 2024, Brady competed at the 2024 World Para Swimming European Open Championships and won a bronze medal in the 50 metre freestyle S6 event. She then represented Ireland at the 2024 Summer Paralympics. Her best finish was fifth place in the 50 metre butterfly S6 event.

She competed at the 2025 World Para Swimming Championships and won a bronze medal in the 50 metre freestyle S6 event.

Brady won 4 medals at the 2026 Para Swimming European Championships in Kocaeli in Turkey.

== Personal life ==
Brady was born with hypochondroplasia.
