= 2022 World Para Swimming Championships – Women's 100 metre butterfly =

The women's 100m butterfly events at the 2022 World Para Swimming Championships were held at the Penteada Olympic Swimming Complex in Madeira between 12 and 18 June.

== Medalists ==
Event	Gold	Silver	Bronze
S8	Laura Carolina González Rodríguez; Colombia	Lim Eunyeong; Korea	Maria Jazmin Aragon Diani; Argentina
S9	Zsófia Konkoly; Hungary	Emily Beecroft; Australia	Toni Shaw; Great Britain
S10	Lisa Kruger; Netherlands	Jasmine Greenwood; Australia	Mikaela Jenkins; United States
S13	Carlotta Gilli; Italy	Gia Pergolini; United States	Roisin Ni Riain; Ireland

== Results ==
=== S13 ===
Heats

12 swimmers from nine nations took part. The swimmers with the top eight times, regardless of heat, advanced to the final.

Rank	Heat	Lane	Name	Nation	Result	Notes
1	2	4	Carlotta Gilli	Italy	1:06.12	Q
2	1	5	Maria Carolina Gomes Santiago	Brazil	1:07.00	
3	1	4	Alessia Berra	Italy	1:07.17	
4	2	5	Gia Pergolini	United States	1:08.87	Q
5	2	6	María Delgado	Spain	1:09.00	
6	1	3	Joanna Mendak	Poland	1:09.61	Q
7	2	3	Roisin Ni Riain	Ireland	1:10.60	Q
8	1	6	Lucilene da Silva Sousa	Brazil	1:10.93	
9	1	2	Muslima Odilova	Uzbekistan	1:11.17	Q
10	2	2	Léane Morceau	France	1:12.31	
11	2	7	Marian Polo Lopez	Spain	1:12.94	Q
12	1	7	Alani Ferreira	South Africa	1:18.56	Q

Final

The final was held on 12 June 2022.

Rank	Athlete	Nation	Result	Notes
1st place, gold medalist(s)	Carlotta Gilli	Italy	1:04.96	
2nd place, silver medalist(s)	Gia Pergolini	United States	1:06.91	
3rd place, bronze medalist(s)	Roisin Ni Riain	Ireland	1:09.05	
4	Joanna Mendak	Poland	1:09.30	
5	Marian Polo Lopez	Spain	1:11.20	
6	Muslima Odilova	Uzbekistan	1:12.79	
7	Alani Ferreira	South Africa	1:18.17	AF
