= Shelby Newkirk =

Canadian Paralympic swimmer (born 1996)

Personal information
- Born: 25 June 1996 (age 30) Saskatoon, Saskatchewan
- Height: 1.82 m (6 ft 0 in)

Sport
- Country: Canada
- Sport: Paralympic swimming
- Disability: Dystonia
- Disability class: S6
- Club: Saskatoon Lasers
Medal record
Paralympic swimming
Representing Canada
Paralympic Games
| Bronze medal – third place | 2024 Paris | 100 m backstroke S6 |
World Championships
| Gold medal – first place | 2022 Madeira | 100m backstroke S6 |
| Gold medal – first place | 2023 Manchester | 100m backstroke S6 |
| Silver medal – second place | 2019 London | 100m backstroke S7 |
| Bronze medal – third place | 2023 Manchester | 50m freestyle S6 |

Shelby Newkirk (born 25 June 1996) is a Canadian Paralympic swimmer who competes in international elite competitions. She is a World Para Swimming Championships medallist and has been selected to compete at the 2020 Summer Paralympics.
