= Christie Raleigh Crossley =

American para swimmer (born 1987)

Personal information
- Born: June 20, 1987 (age 39)
- Home town: Toms River, New Jersey, U.S.

Sport
- Sport: Para swimming
- Disability class: S9
Medal record
Women's para swimming
Representing United States
Paralympic Games
Gold medal – first place	2024 Paris	100 m backstroke S9
Gold medal – first place	2024 Paris	100 m butterfly S9
Silver medal – second place	2024 Paris	50 m freestyle S10
Silver medal – second place	2024 Paris	100 m freestyle S9
Bronze medal – third place	2024 Paris	Mixed 4×100 m freestyle relay 34pts
World Championships
Silver medal – second place	2023 Manchester	100 m backstroke S9
Bronze medal – third place	2025 Singapore	50 m freestyle S9

Christie Raleigh Crossley (born June 20, 1987) is an American para swimmer. They (Note: Crossley uses both she/her and they/them pronouns. This article uses they/them pronouns for consistency.) represented the United States at the 2024 Summer Paralympics.

== Early life and education ==
Raleigh grew up playing several sports, including playing in the boys' leagues for basketball and baseball. In middle school they made the decision to focus on swimming, with dreams of making the Olympic team. At Toms River High School South, they were a state champion and became the second freshman in state history to become the state record-holder in any swimming event. They moved to Florida when they were 15 to attend Pine Crest School, where they were a four-time high school state champion in Florida.

After graduating from Pine Crest, they received a scholarship to swim for Florida State University. They competed there for two years, earning multiple accolades including Athletic Coast Conference (ACC) Freshman of the Year, and two back-to-back National Collegiate Athletic Association (NCAA) All-American honors. An opportunity arose to finish out their NCAA career at Auburn University. Instead, they got married, and three months later was pregnant with their first daughter. They then transferred to Rowan University where they won an NCAA Division III national title in the butterfly.

== Career ==
On March 12, 2023, at the Citi Para Swimming World Series, Raleigh Crossley set a world record in the 50 metre backstroke S9 event with a time of 32.01. They then represented the United States at the 2023 World Para Swimming Championships, where they won a gold medal in the 100 metre backstroke S9 event.

On June 30, 2024, they were named to team USA's roster to compete at the 2024 Summer Paralympics. Despite facing bullying from multiple teammates during the Paralympic Games, and social media comments questioning her disability, Raleigh Crossley became the most decorated Team USA athlete in Paris, winning five medals. They won gold medals in the 100 metre backstroke S9 and 100 metre butterfly S9, silver medals in the 50 metre freestyle S10 and 100 metre freestyle S9, and a bronze medal in the mixed 4 × 100 metre freestyle relay 34pts. All five events were new American Records.

== Personal life ==
In 2007, Raleigh Crossley was hit by a drunk driver while crossing the street and suffered three herniated discs in their neck and one in their lower back. In 2008, they were involved in another accident where they were hit by a car as a pedestrian. The blunt force trauma triggered a non-cancerous tumor to start developing in their brain, and as a result they began to lose function on the left side of their body.

On December 12, 2018, while on a ski trip with their family, Raleigh Crossley's son picked up what he thought was a snowball and struck them in the head. The snowball was actually a block of ice, and they sustained a traumatic brain injury. They experienced paralysis on their left side due to the bleeding of a previously unknown blood tumor in their brain. On January 7, 2019, they had the tumor removed.

Raleigh Crossley has three children. They are non-binary, using she/her and they/them pronouns.
