= Andrei Nikolayev =

Andrei Nikolayev may refer to:

- Andrei Nikolayev (clown) (1938–2023), Russian clown
- Andrei Nikolayev (military officer) (born 1949), major general in the Russian 1st Guards Army
- Andrei Nikolayev (footballer, born 1976) (Andrei Sergeyevich Nikolayev), Russian footballer
- Andrei Nikolayev (footballer, born 1982) (Andrei Aleksandrovich Nikolayev), Russian footballer
- Andrei Nikolaev (swimmer) (born 2000), Russian Paralympic swimmer
