= Florianne Bultje =

Dutch Paralympic swimmer

Personal information
- Born: 26 April 1998 (age 28) Santpoort-Noord, Netherlands

Sport
- Country: Netherlands
- Sport: Para swimming
- Disability: Cerebral palsy
- Disability class: S9
- Events: Freestyle; Butterfly
Medal record
Para swimming
Representing Netherlands
Paralympic Games
Silver medal – second place	2024 Paris	Mixed 4×100 m medley relay 34pts
World Championships
Bronze medal – third place	2022 Funchal	Mixed 4x100m medley relay 34pts
Bronze medal – third place	2023 London	Women's 50m freestyle S9
European Championships
Gold medal – first place	2026 Kocaeli	50 m freestyle S9
Silver medal – second place	2026 Kocaeli	100 m butterfly S9

Florianne Bultje (born 26 April 1998) is a Dutch Paralympic swimmer who competes in international swimming competitions. She is two-time World bronze medalist.
