= Alexander Hillhouse =

Danish para swimmer (born 2004)

Personal information
- Nationality: Danish
- Born: 20 April 2004 (age 22) Erie, Pennsylvania, U.S.
- Home town: Tårnby, Denmark

Sport
- Sport: Para swimming
- Disability class: S14
- Club: KVIK Kastrup
Medal record
Men's para-swimming
Representing Denmark
Paralympic Games
Gold medal – first place	2024 Paris	100 m butterfly S14
World Championships
Silver medal – second place	2023 Manchester	100 m butterfly S14
Bronze medal – third place	2022 Madeira	100 m backstroke S14
Bronze medal – third place	2023 Manchester	100 m backstroke S14
Bronze medal – third place	2025 Singapore	100 m butterfly S14
European Championships
Gold medal – first place	2026 Kocaeli	100 m backstroke S14
Gold medal – first place	2026 Kocaeli	100 m butterfly S14

Alexander Hillhouse (born 20 April 2004) is a Danish para swimmer, who won gold in the 100 m butterfly S14 at the 2024 Summer Paralympics in Paris.
