= Róisín Ní Ríain =

Irish swimmer (born 2005)

Personal information
- Born: 7 May 2005 (age 21) Drombanna, County Limerick, Ireland

Sport
- Country: Ireland
- Sport: Para swimming
- Disability: Visual impairment
- Disability class: S13, SB13, SM13
- Events: backstroke; individual medley; butterfly; breaststroke; freestyle
- Club: Limerick Swimming Club
- Coached by: John Szaranek
Medal record
Para swimming
Representing Ireland
Paralympic Games
Silver medal – second place	2024 Paris	100m backstroke S13
Bronze medal – third place	2024 Paris	200m medley SM13
World Championships
Gold medal – first place	2023 Manchester	100m backstroke S13
Silver medal – second place	2023 Manchester	100m butterfly S13
Silver medal – second place	2025 Singapore	100m breaststroke SB13
Silver medal – second place	2025 Singapore	100 m backstroke S13
Silver medal – second place	2025 Singapore	400 m freestyle S13
Bronze medal – third place	2022 Madeira	100m backstroke S13
Bronze medal – third place	2022 Madeira	100m butterfly S13
Bronze medal – third place	2025 Singapore	100m butterfly S13
Bronze medal – third place	2025 Singapore	200m medley SM13
European Championships
Gold medal – first place	2024 Madeira	100m backstroke S13
Gold medal – first place	2024 Madeira	100m breastroke SB13
Gold medal – first place	2026 Koaceli	100m backstroke S13
Silver medal – second place	2024 Madeira	100m butterfly S13
Silver medal – second place	2024 Madeira	200m IM SM13
Silver medal – second place	2026 Koaceli	100m freestyle S13
Silver medal – second place	2026 Koaceli	200m IM SM13
Bronze medal – third place	2020 Madeira	100m backstroke S13
Bronze medal – third place	2024 Madeira	400m freestyle S13

Róisín Ní Ríain ([ˈɾˠoːʃiːnʲ nʲiː ˈɾˠiənʲ] ROE-sheen nee REE-un; born 7 May 2005) is an Irish competitive Para swimmer in the S13 classification. She is a Paralympic silver and bronze medallist and has been both European champion and world champion.

== Career ==
She competed at the 2020 World Para Swimming European Open Championships and won a bronze medal in the 100 metre backstroke S13 event. She competed at the 2022 World Para Swimming Championships and won bronze medals in the 100m backstroke and 100m butterfly S13 events.

She was the youngest athlete for Ireland at the 2020 Summer Paralympics but she did not medal.

She was Ireland's only medalist in swimming at the 2024 Paralympics after winning two medals a silver in the 100m backstroke and a bronze in the 200m Individual medley and finished 4th in her two other events. She was grand marshal of Limerick's 2025 St Patrick's Day parade.
