= Veronika Korzhova =

Ukrainian Paralympic swimmer (born 2007)

Personal information
- Nationality: Ukrainian
- Born: 23 November 2007 (age 18)
- Home town: Soledar, Ukraine

Sport
- Sport: Para swimming
- Disability class: S7, SM7
Medal record
Women's paralympic swimming
Representing Ukraine
Paralympic Games
Bronze medal – third place	2024 Paris	Mixed 4×50 m medley relay 20pts
World Championships
Gold medal – first place	2025 Singapore	100 m backstroke S7
Silver medal – second place	2025 Singapore	200 m ind. medley SM7
Bronze medal – third place	2023 Manchester	100 m backstroke S7
Bronze medal – third place	2025 Singapore	100 m breaststroke SB6
European Championships
Gold medal – first place	2024 Madeira	100 m freestyle S7
Gold medal – first place	2024 Madeira	400 m freestyle S7
Gold medal – first place	2026 Kocaeli	200 m medley SM7
Silver medal – second place	2024 Madeira	50 m butterfly S7
Silver medal – second place	2024 Madeira	200 m medley SM7
Silver medal – second place	2024 Madeira	4×50 m medley relay 20pts
Silver medal – second place	2026 Kocaeli	50 m butterfly S7
Silver medal – second place	2026 Kocaeli	50 m freestyle S7
Bronze medal – third place	2024 Madeira	4×50 m freestyle relay 20pts
Bronze medal – third place	2026 Kocaeli	4×50 m medley relay 20pts

Veronika Korzhova (born 23 November 2007) is a Ukrainian Paralympic swimmer. She represented Ukraine at the 2024 Summer Paralympics.

== Career ==
Korzhova represented Ukraine at the 2023 World Para Swimming Championships and won a bronze medal in the 100 metre backstroke S7 event.

Korzhova represented Ukraine at the 2024 Summer Paralympics and won a bronze medal in the mixed 4 × 50 metre medley relay 20pts event.
