= Callie-Ann Warrington =

British Paralympic swimmer (born 2000)

Personal information
- Nationality: British
- Born: 22 August 2000 (age 26) Maidstone, U.K.
- Home town: Ashford, Kent
- Height: 182 cm (6 ft 0 in)

Sport
- Sport: Paralympic swimming
- Disability class: S10
- Club: Hackney Anaconda
- Coached by: David Broadbent
Medal record
Women's paralympic swimming
Representing Great Britain
Paralympic Games
Silver medal – second place	2024 Paris	100 m butterfly S10
European Championships
Gold medal – first place	2024 Funchal	100 m butterfly S10
Silver medal – second place	2026 Kocaeli	100 m freestyle S10
Bronze medal – third place	2026 Kocaeli	50 m freestyle S10

Callie-Ann Warrington (born 22 August 2000) is a British Paralympic swimmer. She represented Great Britain at the 2024 Summer Paralympics.

== Career ==
In April 2024, Warrington represented Great Britain at the 2024 World Para Swimming European Open Championships and won a gold medal in the 100 metre butterfly S10 event. She then represented Great Britain at the 2024 Summer Paralympics and won a silver medal in the 100 metre butterfly S10 event.

Warrington is also a qualified Diagnostic Radiographer. She graduated from London South Bank University in 2023 with a degree in BSc Hons Diagnostic Radiography. CWarrington worked full time in the run up to the Paris Paralympic Games in 2024 at the Princess Royal University Hospital (PRUH) in Oprington, Kent, which is part of the Kings College NHS Foundation Trust. She now swims full time and works as a radiographer part time.
