= Swimming at the 2024 Summer Paralympics – Men's 100 metre backstroke S13 =

Men's 100 metre backstroke S13 at the XVII Paralympic Games
- Venue: La Défense Arena
- Date: 30 August 2024
- Competitors: 14 from 9 nations
- Winning time: 56.60

Medalists
| 1st place, gold medalist(s) | | Ihar Boki | Neutral Paralympic Athletes |
| 2nd place, silver medalist(s) | | Vladimir Sotnikov | Neutral Paralympic Athletes |
| 3rd place, bronze medalist(s) | | Alex Portal | France |

The men's 100 metre backstroke (S13) event at the 2024 Summer Paralympics took place on 30 August 2024, at the La Défense Arena in Paris.

== Records ==
Prior to the competition, the existing world and Paralympic records were as follows.

| World Record | Ihar Boki (BLR) | 56.36 | Tokyo, Japan | 26 August 2021 |
| Paralympic Record | Ihar Boki (BLR) | 56.36 | Tokyo, Japan | 26 August 2021 |

== Results ==
=== Heats ===
The heats were started at 11:02.

| Rank | Heat | Lane | Name | Nationality | Time | Notes |
|---|---|---|---|---|---|---|
| 1 | 1 | 4 | Vladimir Sotnikov | Neutral Paralympic Athletes | 58.32 | Q |
| 2 | 2 | 4 | Ihar Boki | Neutral Paralympic Athletes | 58.97 | Q |
| 3 | 1 | 5 | Alex Portal | France | 59.56 | Q |
| 4 | 2 | 5 | Thomas van Wanrooij | Netherlands | 1:00.41 | Q |
| 5 | 2 | 3 | Oleksii Virchenko | Ukraine | 1:01.09 | Q |
| 6 | 2 | 6 | Enrique Alhambra | Spain | 1:02.56 | Q |
| 7 | 1 | 3 | Kirill Pankov | Uzbekistan | 1:03.31 | Q |
| 8 | 2 | 2 | Nathan Hendricks | South Africa | 1:03.53 | Q |
| 9 | 2 | 7 | Genki Saito | Japan | 1:03.67 | |
| 10 | 1 | 6 | Serhiy Klippert | Ukraine | 1:03.73 | |
| 11 | 1 | 2 | Muzaffar Tursunkhujaev | Uzbekistan | 1:04.92 | |
| 12 | 1 | 7 | Islam Aslanov | Uzbekistan | 1:05.80 | |
| 13 | 1 | 1 | Philip Hebmüller | Germany | 1:05.88 | |
| 14 | 2 | 1 | Yauheni Kavalionak | Neutral Paralympic Athletes | 1:05.97 | |

=== Final ===
The final was held at 19:44.

| Rank | Lane | Name | Nationality | Time | Notes |
|---|---|---|---|---|---|
| 1st place, gold medalist(s) | 5 | Ihar Boki | Neutral Paralympic Athletes | 56.60 | |
| 2nd place, silver medalist(s) | 4 | Vladimir Sotnikov | Neutral Paralympic Athletes | 57.95 | |
| 3rd place, bronze medalist(s) | 3 | Alex Portal | France | 59.08 | |
| 4 | 6 | Thomas van Wanrooij | Netherlands | 1:00.55 | |
| 5 | 7 | Enrique Alhambra | Spain | 1:00.86 | |
| 6 | 2 | Oleksii Virchenko | Ukraine | 1:01.05 | |
| 7 | 8 | Nathan Hendricks | South Africa | 1:03.43 | |
| 8 | 1 | Kirill Pankov | Uzbekistan | 1:03.73 | |
