= Anastasiya Dmytriv =

Spanish Paralympic swimmer (born 2008)

Personal information
- Full name: Anastasiya Dmytriv Dmytriv
- Nickname: Tasy
- Nationality: Spanish
- Born: 7 August 2008 (age 18) Lviv, Ukraine
- Home town: Vícar, Spain

Sport
- Sport: Paralympic swimming
- Disability class: S9, SM9, SB8
Medal record
Women's paralympic swimming
Representing Spain
Paralympic Games
Gold medal – first place	2024 Paris	100 m breaststroke SB8
Bronze medal – third place	2024 Paris	200 m medley SM9
Bronze medal – third place	2024 Paris	Mixed 4x100 medley 34 points
World Championships
Gold medal – first place	2022 Madeira	100 m breaststroke SB8
Gold medal – first place	2023 Manchester	100 m breaststroke SB8
Gold medal – first place	2023 Manchester	Mixed 4×100 m medley relay 34pts
Gold medal – first place	2025 Singapore	100 m breaststroke SB8
Gold medal – first place	2025 Singapore	Mixed 4×100 m medley relay 34pts
Silver medal – second place	2022 Madeira	Mixed 4×100 m medley relay 34pts
Silver medal – second place	2025 Singapore	200 m ind. medley SM9
Bronze medal – third place	2022 Madeira	200 m ind. medley SM9
European Championships
Gold medal – first place	2024 Madeira	100 m breastroke SB8
Silver medal – second place	2026 Kocaeli	100 m breaststroke SB9
Silver medal – second place	2026 Kocaeli	200 m ind. medley SM9
Bronze medal – third place	2024 Madeira	Mixed 4×100 m medley relay 34pts
Bronze medal – third place	2026 Kocaeli	50 m freestyle S9

Anastasiya Dmytriv Dmytriv (born 7 August 2008) is a Spanish Paralympic swimmer. She represented Spain at the 2024 Summer Paralympics.

== Early life ==
Dmytriv was born in Ukraine, and moved to Spain, with her parents at two years old. She was granted Spanish citizenship in 2022.

== Career ==
Dmytriv made her international debut for Spain at the 2022 World Para Swimming Championships and won a gold medal in the 100 metre breaststroke SB8, a silver medal in the mixed 4 × 100 m medley relay 34pts and a bronze medal in the 200 metre individual medley SM9 events.

Dmytriv represented Spain at the 2024 Summer Paralympics and won a gold medal in the 100 metre breaststroke Sb8, and bronze medals in the 200 metre individual medley SM9 and mixed 4 × 100 metre medley relay 34pts.
