= Iryna Poida =

Ukrainian Paralympic swimmer

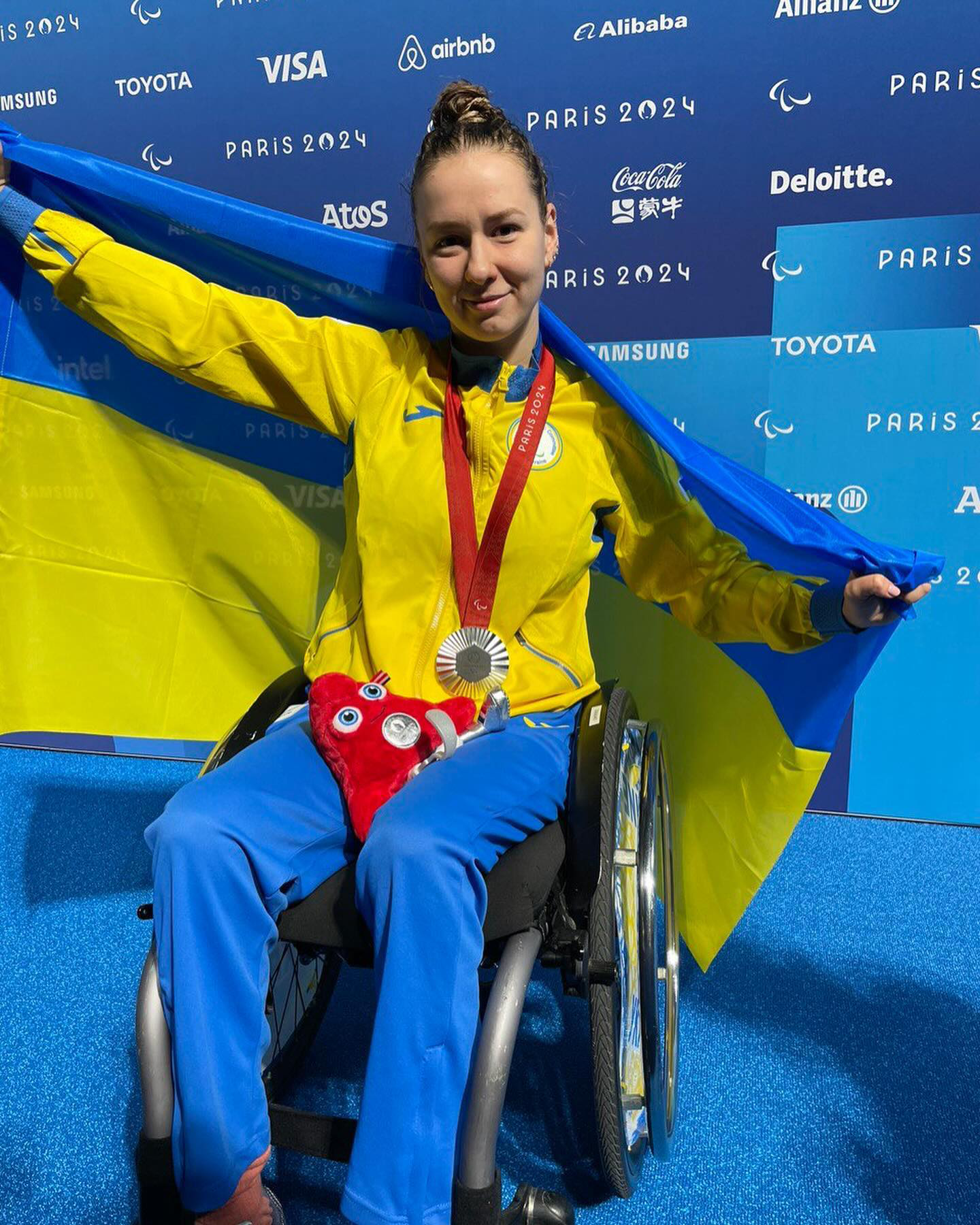
- Poida at the 2024 Summer Paralympics

Personal information
- Nationality: Ukrainian
- Born: 24 July 1998 (age 27)

Sport
- Sport: Paralympic swimming
- Disability class: S5
Medal record
Women's para-swimming
Representing Ukraine
Paralympic Games
Silver medal – second place	2024 Paris	100 m freestyle S5
Silver medal – second place	2024 Paris	200 m freestyle S5
Bronze medal – third place	2024 Paris	Mixed 4×50 m medley relay 20pts
World Championships
Bronze medal – third place	2023 Manchester	100 m freestyle S5
Bronze medal – third place	2023 Manchester	Mixed 4x50 m freestyle relay (20 pts)
European Championships
Gold medal – first place	2024 Funchal	50 m freestyle S5
Gold medal – first place	2024 Funchal	50 m backstroke S5
Silver medal – second place	2024 Funchal	100 m freestyle S5
Silver medal – second place	2024 Funchal	200 m freestyle S5
Silver medal – second place	2024 Funchal	Mixed 4x50 m medley relay (20 pts)
Bronze medal – third place	2024 Funchal	Mixed 4x50 m freestyle relay (20 pts)

Iryna Poida (born 24 July 1998) is a Ukrainian swimmer, who won silver in the 200 m freestyle S5 at the 2024 Summer Paralympics in Paris.
