= Andrei Nikolayev (clown) =

Russian clown, artistic director and teacher

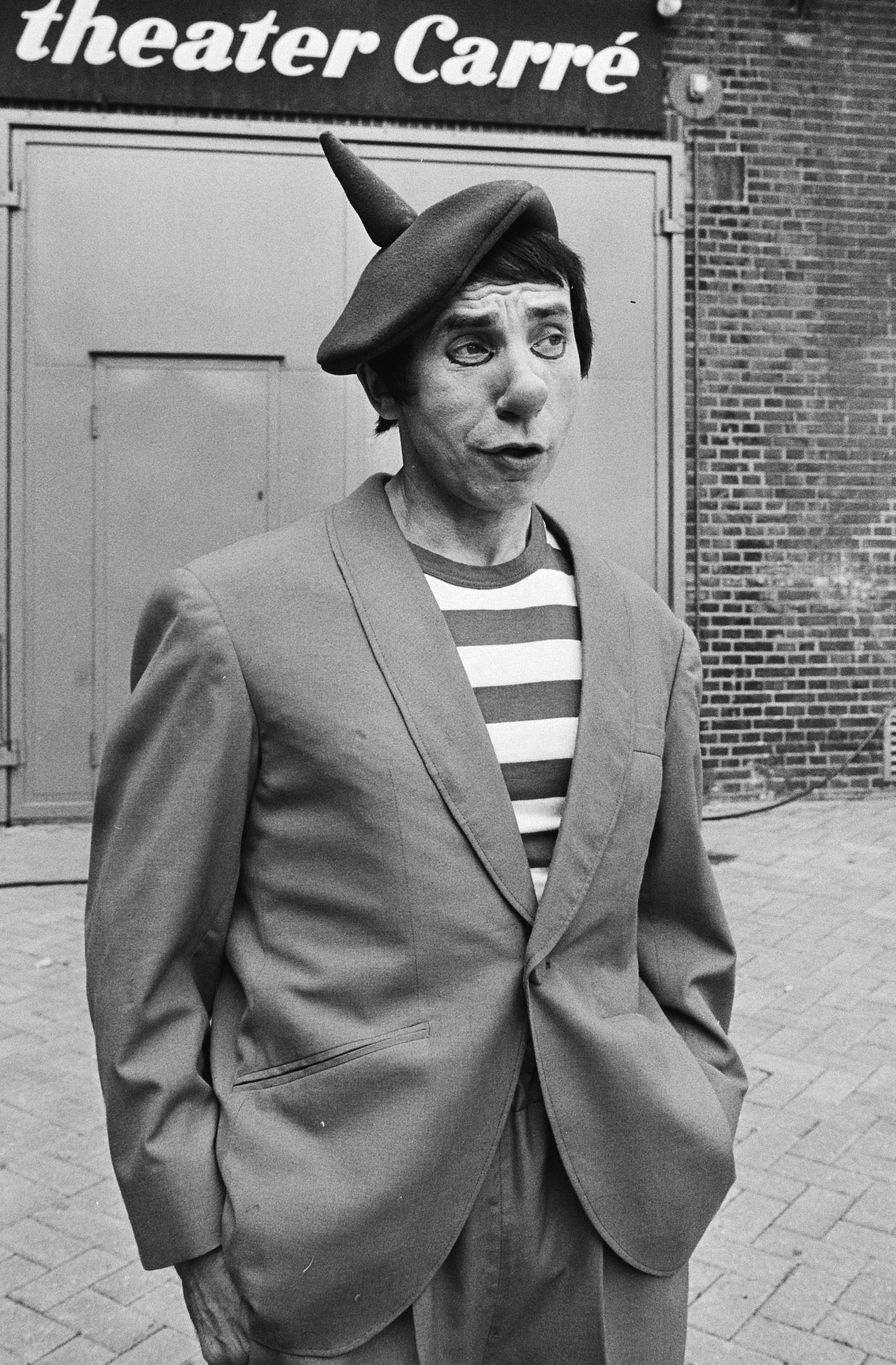
Nikolayev in 1983

Andrei Nikolayevich Nikolayev (Russian: Андрей Николаевич Николаев, 27 March 1938 – 14 August 2023) was a Soviet and Russian clown, artistic director and teacher.

== Biography ==
Nikolayev graduated from the State School of Circus in 1958, and from the Russian Institute of Theatre Arts in 1973 with an artistic director degree. During his early career he assisted Karandash and Emil Kio, but since 1960s performed on his own. In 1978 he became head of the group "Komediinyi Tsirk" (Comedy Circus) and designed the spectacles I Work As a Clown (Russian: Я работаю клоуном, 1978) and Topsy-turvy (Russian: Шиворот-навыворот, 1987), where he also played leading roles. In the 1990s he wrote several award-winning compositions for other clowns, including his son Andrei Nikolayev Jr. (1966–2007).

Nikolayev was awarded Grock d'or in 1969 and became a People's Artist of the RSFSR in 1980. From 1976 he lectured at the Russian Institute of Theatre Arts.

Nikolayev died on 14 August 2023, at the age of 85.
