= Mariana Ribeiro =

Brazilian Paralympic swimmer

Personal information
- Full name: Mariana Gesteira Ribeiro
- Born: 28 June 1995 (age 31) Itaboraí, Rio de Janeiro, Brazil

Sport
- Sport: Swimming
Medal record
Women's para swimming
Representing Brazil
Paralympic Games
Bronze medal – third place	2020 Tokyo	100 m freestyle S9
Bronze medal – third place	2024 Paris	100 m freestyle S9
Bronze medal – third place	2024 Paris	100 m backstroke S9
World Championships
Gold medal – first place	2022 Madeira	100 m freestyle S9
Gold medal – first place	2022 Madeira	50 m freestyle S9
Gold medal – first place	2023 Manchester	50 m freestyle S9
Gold medal – first place	2025 Singapore	100 m backstroke S9
Gold medal – first place	2025 Singapore	50 m freestyle S9
Silver medal – second place	2025 Singapore	100 m freestyle S9
Bronze medal – third place	2022 Madeira	100 m backstroke S9
Bronze medal – third place	2023 Manchester	100 m backstroke S9

Mariana Gesteira Ribeiro (born 28 June 1995) is a Brazilian Paralympic swimmer. She competed at the 2020 Summer Paralympics in Tokyo, where she won the bronze medal in the 100 meter freestyle event in the S9 class.

Ribeiro is part of the LGBTQ+ community.

== Career ==
Ribeiro learned to swim at the age of ten. At 14, she was diagnosed with Arnold Chiari syndrome, a condition that affects the brain and nervous system.
