= Olivia Newman-Baronius =

British Paralympic swimmer

Personal information
- Born: 23 December 2006 (age 19) Aylesbury

Sport
- Sport: Swimming
- Strokes: Butterfly, Freestyle, Backstroke, Breaststroke and Individual Medley
- Classifications: S14
- Club: Maxwell Swimming Club
- Coach: Tom Elgar
Medal record
Women's para-swimming
Representing Great Britain
Paralympic Games
Gold medal – first place	2024 Paris	Mixed 4×100 m freestyle relay S14
Bronze medal – third place	2024 Paris	100 m backstroke S14
World Championships
Silver medal – second place	2025 Singapore	100 m butterfly S14
Silver medal – second place	2025 Singapore	200 m ind. medley SM14
Bronze medal – third place	2025 Singapore	100 m breaststroke SB14
European Championships
Gold medal – first place	2026 Kocaeli	100 m butterfly S14
Silver medal – second place	2026 Kocaeli	100 m breaststroke S14
Bronze medal – third place	2026 Kocaeli	100 m backstroke S14

Olivia Newman-Baronius (born 23 December 2006) is a British paralympic swimmer.

== Career ==
She competed at the 2024 Summer Paralympics and won a gold medal in the mixed 4 × 100m freestyle relay S14.
