= William Ellard =

British Paralympic swimmer (born 2006)

William Ellard MBE
Personal information
- Full name: William Thomas Ellard
- Born: 4 April 2006 (age 20) Beccles, England
- Height: 183.2 cm (6 ft 0 in)
- Weight: 77 kg (170 lb)

Sport
- Country: Great Britain
- Sport: Paralympic swimming
- Disability: intellectual impairment
- Disability class: S14
- Coached by: Nicholas Thompson (Nick)
Medal record
Men's para-swimming
Representing Great Britain
Paralympic Games
Gold medal – first place	2024 Paris	200 m freestyle S14
Gold medal – first place	2024 Paris	Mixed 4×100 m freestyle relay S14
Silver medal – second place	2024 Paris	100 m butterfly S14
World Championships
Gold medal – first place	2023 Manchester	Mixed 4×100 m freestyle relay S14
Gold medal – first place	2025 Singapore	Mixed 4×100 m freestyle relay S14
Gold medal – first place	2025 Singapore	Mixed 4×100 m medley relay S14
Gold medal – first place	2025 Singapore	200 m freestyle S14
Gold medal – first place	2025 Singapore	100 m butterfly S14
Silver medal – second place	2023 Manchester	200 m freestyle S14
Silver medal – second place	2023 Manchester	Mixed 4×100 m medley relay S14
Bronze medal – third place	2025 Singapore	100 m backstroke S14
European Championships
Gold medal – first place	2024 Funchal	200 m freestyle S14
Gold medal – first place	2026 Kocaeli	200 m freestyle S14
Gold medal – first place	2024 Funchal	100 m butterfly S14
Silver medal – second place	2024 Funchal	100 m backstroke S14
Silver medal – second place	2026 Kocaeli	100 m backstroke S14
Silver medal – second place	2026 Kocaeli	100 m butterfly S14
Bronze medal – third place	2024 Funchal	200 m ind. medley SM14
Bronze medal – third place	2026 Kocaeli	200 m ind. medley SM14

William Ellard (born 4 April 2006) is a British swimmer, who won three medals at the 2024 Summer Paralympics in Paris, including gold in the 200 m freestyle S14 where he set a new world record and Mixed 4 × 100 m freestyle relay S14.

Ellard competes in the S14 paralympic category for intellectual impairment.

== Early life ==
Ellard grew up in Beccles in Suffolk. He began swimming at the Beccles Kingfishers Swimming Club, before attending Saint Felix School where he took part in the school's swimming club.

== Career ==
In 2023, Ellard claimed gold at the Men's 100m Freestyle in the British World Series. He went on to win three medals at the 2023 World Para Swimming Championships in Manchester.

Ellard competed in the 2024 Summer Paralympics. He took the silver medal in the 100 m butterfly S14, before winning gold medal in the 200 m freestyle S14, lowering the world record previously set by Reece Dunn by over a second. He also won gold in the Mixed 4 × 100 m freestyle relay S14.

Ellard was appointed Member of the Order of the British Empire (MBE) in the 2025 New Year Honours for services to swimming.
