= Mira Jeanne Maack =

German Paralympic swimmer

Personal information
- Born: 20 January 2004 (age 22) Berlin, Germany

Sport
- Country: Germany
- Sport: Paralympic swimming
- Disability: Club foot Hip dysplasia
- Disability class: S8, SB7, SM8
- Events: Freestyle; Backstroke; Breaststroke; Butterfly; Medley
- Coached by: Ute Schinkitz
Medal record
Women's para swimming
Representing Germany
Paralympic Games
Bronze medal – third place	2024 Paris	100m backstroke S8
World Championships
Silver medal – second place	2022 Funchal	200m ind. medley SM8
Bronze medal – third place	2022 Funchal	100m backstroke S8
Bronze medal – third place	2025 Singapore	100 m backstroke S8
European Championships
Silver medal – second place	2021 Funchal	100m breaststroke SB7
Silver medal – second place	2026 Kocaeli	100m backstroke S8
Bronze medal – third place	2021 Funchal	400m freestyle S8

Mira Jeanne Maack (born 20 January 2004) is a German Paralympic swimmer who competes in international swimming competitions. She is a World and European silver medalist and has competed at the 2020 Summer Paralympics.
