= Swimming at the 2024 Summer Paralympics – Men's 200 metre individual medley SM13 =

Men's 200 metre individual medley SM13 at the XVII Paralympic Games
- Venue: La Défense Arena
- Date: 3 September 2024
- Competitors: 14 from 10 nations
- Winning time: 2:23.03

Medalists
1st place, gold medalist(s)		Ihar Boki	Neutral Paralympic Athletes
2nd place, silver medalist(s)		Alex Portal	France
3rd place, bronze medalist(s)		Vladimir Sotnikov	Neutral Paralympic Athletes

The men's 200 metre individual medley swimming (SM13) event at the 2024 Summer Paralympics took place on 3 September 2024, at the La Défense Arena in Paris.

== Records ==
Prior to the competition, the existing world and Paralympic records were as follows.

SM12 records

World Record	Danylo Chufarov (UKR)	2:10.87	Montreal, Canada	14 August 2013
Paralympic Record	Danylo Chufarov (UKR)	2:11.12	Rio de Janeiro, Brazil	10 September 2016

SM13 records

World Record	Ihar Boki (BLR)	2:02.70	Tokyo, Japan	30 August 2021
Paralympic Record	Ihar Boki (BLR)	2:21.17	Tokyo, Japan	30 August 2021

== Results ==
=== Heats ===
The heats were started at 11:04.

Rank	Heat	Lane	Name	Nationality	Class	Time	Notes
1	2	4	Ihar Boki	Neutral Paralympic Athletes	SM13	2:10.55	Q
2	2	5	Vladimir Sotnikov	Neutral Paralympic Athletes	SM13	2:14.64	Q
3	1	3	Kyrylo Garashchenko	Ukraine	SM13	2:15.53	Q
4	1	4	Alex Portal	France	SM13	2:15.63	Q
5	1	5	Thomas van Wanrooij	Netherlands	SM13	2:16.54	Q
6	1	6	Genki Saito	Japan	SM13	2:16.62	Q
7	2	6	David Abrahams	United States	SM13	2:17.81	Q
8	2	2	Nathan Hendricks	South Africa	SM13	2:18.36	Q
9	2	7	Philip Hebmüller	Germany	SM13	2:20.25	
10	1	6	Nurdaulet Zhumagali	Kazakhstan	SM12	2:20.31	
11	2	1	Dmitriy Horlin	Uzbekistan	SM12	2:22.27	
12	1	7	Firdavsbek Musabekov	Uzbekistan	SM13	2:23.06	
13	1	1	Muzaffar Tursunkhujaev	Uzbekistan	SM13	2:24.47	
	2	3	Taliso Engel	Germany	SM13	Disqualified	

=== Final ===
The final was held at 19:40.

Rank	Lane	Name	Nationality	Class	Time	Notes
1st place, gold medalist(s)	4	Ihar Boki	Neutral Paralympic Athletes	SM13	2:02.03	WR
2nd place, silver medalist(s)	6	Alex Portal	France	SM13	2:06.66	
3rd place, bronze medalist(s)	5	Vladimir Sotnikov	Neutral Paralympic Athletes	SM13	2:10.56	
4	3	Kyrylo Garashchenko	Ukraine	SM13	2:14.27	
5	2	Thomas van Wanrooij	Netherlands	SM13	2:15.38	
6	1	David Abrahams	United States	SM13	2:16.95	
7	8	Nathan Hendricks	South Africa	SM13	2:17.15	AF
8	7	Genki Saito	Japan	SM13	2:17.51	
