= Alex Portal =

French Paralympic swimmer (born 2002)

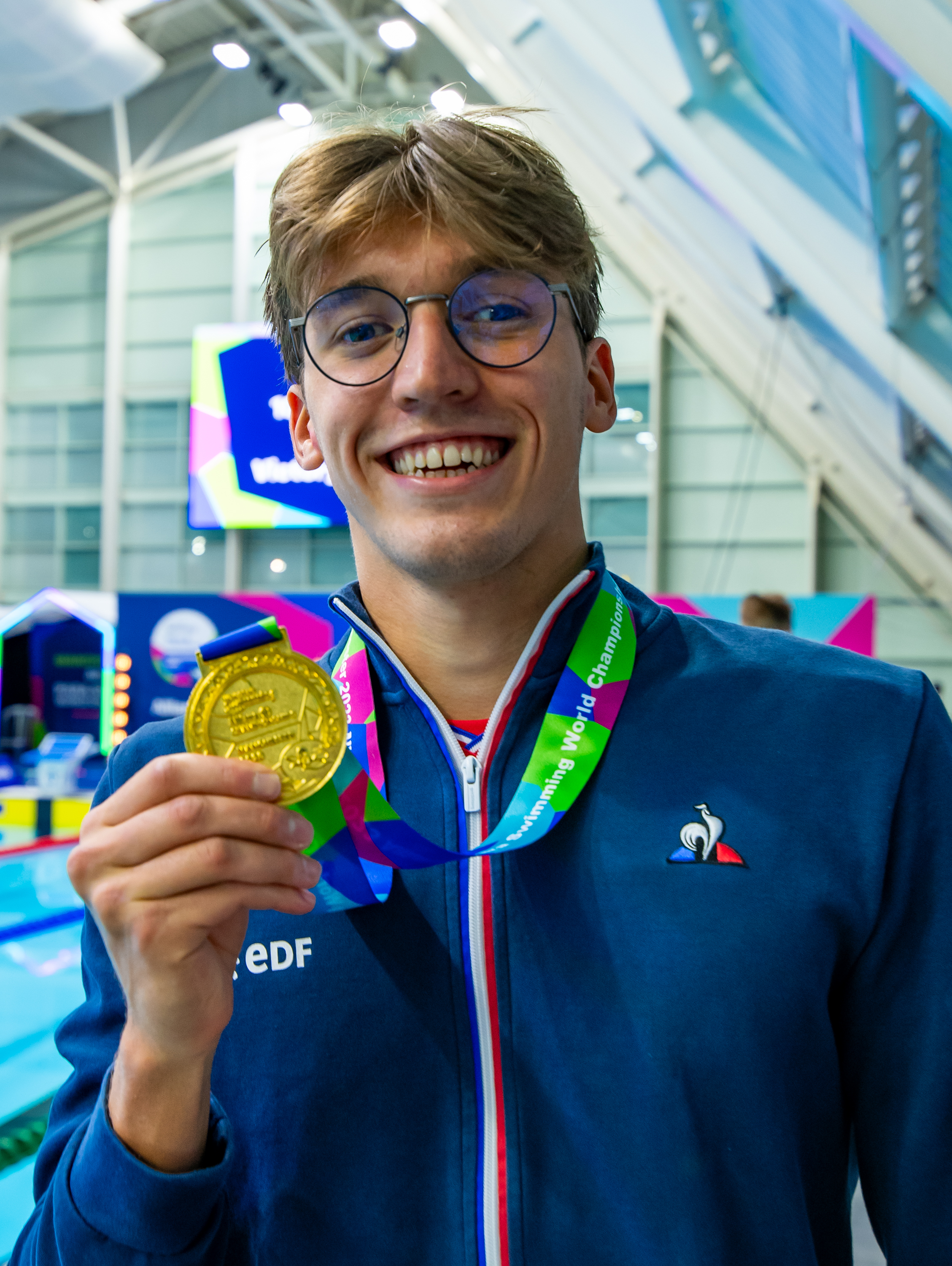
- Portal in 2023

Personal information
- Born: 12 February 2002 (age 24) Saint-Germain-en-Laye, France

Sport
- Sport: Paralympic swimming
- Disability class: S13, SM13
Medal record
Men's paralympic swimming
Representing France
Paralympic Games
| Silver medal – second place | 2020 Tokyo | 200 m medley SM13 |
| Silver medal – second place | 2024 Paris | 400 m freestyle S13 |
| Silver medal – second place | 2024 Paris | 100 m butterfly S13 |
| Silver medal – second place | 2024 Paris | 200 m medley SM13 |
| Bronze medal – third place | 2020 Tokyo | 400 m freestyle S13 |
World Championships
| Gold medal – first place | 2022 Madeira | 200 m medley SM13 |
| Gold medal – first place | 2023 Manchester | 200 m medley SM13 |
| Gold medal – first place | 2023 Manchester | 100 m freestyle S13 |
| Gold medal – first place | 2023 Manchester | 400 m freestyle S13 |
| Silver medal – second place | 2022 Madeira | 100 m butterfly S13 |
| Silver medal – second place | 2022 Madeira | 400 m freestyle S13 |
| Silver medal – second place | 2023 Manchester | 100 m butterfly S13 |
| Silver medal – second place | 2025 Singapore | 400 m freestyle S13 |
| Silver medal – second place | 2025 Singapore | 200 m medley SM13 |
| Bronze medal – third place | 2022 Madeira | 100 m freestyle S13 |
| Bronze medal – third place | 2025 Singapore | 100 m butterfly S13 |

Alex Portal (born 12 February 2002) is a French Paralympic swimmer. He competed at the 2020 Summer Paralympics, winning two medals, and at the 2024 Summer Paralympics, winning four medals.

== Biography ==
Portal was born on 12 February 2002 in Saint-Germain-en-Laye, France. He and his younger brother Kylian were both born with ocular albinism, a condition resulting in poor eyesight. Alex began swimming at age five at the club CN Pecq, and later began competing at age seven with the club Cercle des nageurs de l'ouest in Saint-Germain-en-Laye. He attended the business school Ecole de Management Léonard De Vinci.

Portal initially competed against non-disabled swimmers, before registering for para swimming in 2016. He competed at the French national championships and qualified for the national team shortly after. Classified as an S13 swimmer, Portal won two medals at the 2019 World Para Swimming Championships. He qualified for the 2020 Summer Paralympics and won two medals: a bronze in the 400m freestyle S13 and a silver in the 200m medley S13. In September 2021, he was honored with the Ordre national du Mérite from the president.

In 2022, Portal won four medals, including a gold, at the World Para Swimming Championships. The following year, he won three gold medals and a silver at the world championships. In the 400m freestyle event, in which he won gold, his brother Kylian also competed and won bronze.

In December 2023, Portal and his brother received scholarships from the city of Saint-Germain-en-Laye for €5,000. In 2024, a sign was installed at the entrance of the city to celebrate the two brothers' accomplishments. At the 2024 European championships, Alex won four medals. Both he and his brother were selected for the 2024 Summer Paralympics. At the Paralympics, Alex won four medals – silver in the 100m butterfly, silver in the 400m freestyle, silver in the 200m medley and bronze in the 100m backstroke. In the 400m freestyle, he placed one spot above his brother Kylian, the bronze medalist.
