= Hector Denayer =

French Paralympic swimmer (born 2005)

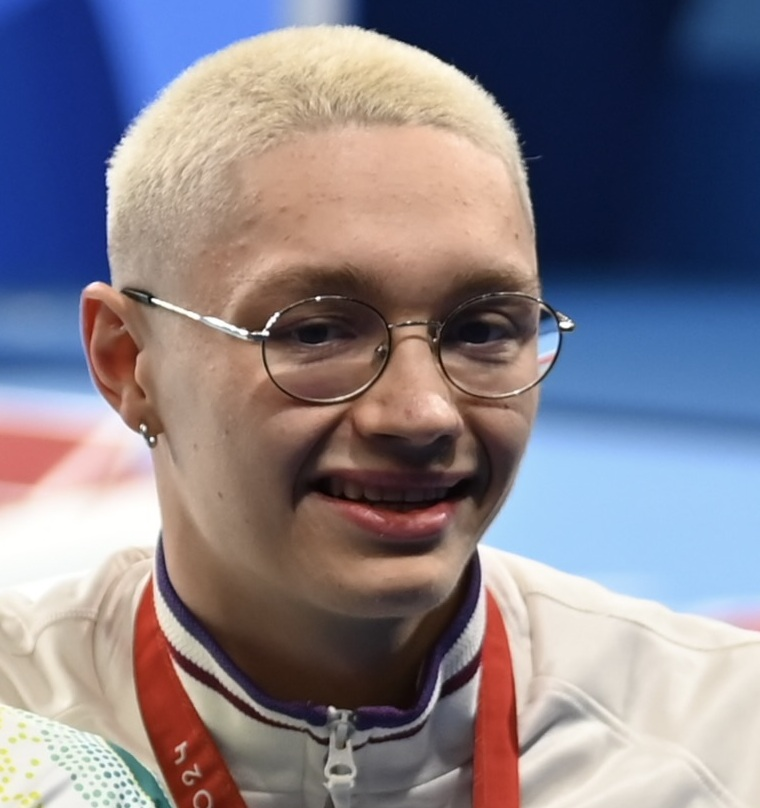
- Denayer at the 2024 Summer Paralympics

Personal information
- Born: 8 April 2005 (age 21) Sélestat, France

Sport
- Sport: Paralympic swimming
- Disability class: S9, SB9
Medal record
Men's paralympic swimming
Representing France
Paralympic Games
Silver medal – second place	2024 Paris	100 m breaststroke SB9
Bronze medal – third place	2024 Paris	200 m medley SM9
World Championships
Gold medal – first place	2025 Singapore	100 m breaststroke SB9
Silver medal – second place	2025 Singapore	200 m medley SM9
Silver medal – second place	2025 Singapore	100m freestyle S9
Bronze medal – third place	2023 Manchester	100 m breaststroke SB9
Bronze medal – third place	2025 Singapore	Mixed 4×100 m freestyle relay 34 pts
European Championships
Gold medal – first place	2026 Kocaeli	100 m breaststroke SB9
Gold medal – first place	2026 Kocaeli	200 m medley SM9
Silver medal – second place	2024 Funchal	100 m breaststroke SB9
Silver medal – second place	2024 Funchal	200 m ind. medley SM9
Bronze medal – third place	2026 Kocaeli	100 m butterfly S9

Hector Denayer (born 8 April 2005) is a French Paralympic swimmer. He represented France at the 2024 Summer Paralympics.

== Career ==
Denayer represented France at the 2024 Summer Paralympics and won a silver medal in the 100 metre breaststroke SB9 event.
