= Vladimir Sotnikov =

Russian Paralympic swimmer

Personal information
- Born: 19 June 2004 (age 22) Satka, Russia

Sport
- Sport: Paralympic swimming
- Disability class: S13, SB13, SM13
Medal record
Paralympic swimming
Representing RPC
Paralympic Games
Gold medal – first place	2020 Tokyo	4×100 m freestyle relay 49pts
Bronze medal – third place	2020 Tokyo	100 m backstroke S13
Representing Neutral Paralympic Athletes
Paralympic Games
Silver medal – second place	2024 Paris	100 m backstroke S13
Bronze medal – third place	2024 Paris	200 m ind. medley SM13
European Championships
Gold medal – first place	2024 Funchal	100 m backstroke S13
Gold medal – first place	2024 Funchal	200 m ind. medley SM13
Representing Russia
European Championships
Gold medal – first place	2026 Kocaeli	100 m backstroke S12
Gold medal – first place	2026 Kocaeli	50 m freestyle S12
Silver medal – second place	2026 Kocaeli	100 m freestyle S12
Silver medal – second place	2026 Kocaeli	100 m butterfly S12

Vladimir Sotnikov (born 19 June 2004) is a Russian Paralympic swimmer. In 2021, he won bronze in the 100 metre backstroke S13 at the 2020 Summer Paralympics held in Tokyo, Japan.
