= Emma Feliu Martin =

Spanish Paralympic swimmer (born 2003)

Personal information
- Born: 31 October 2003 (age 22) Fortià, Spain

Sport
- Sport: Para swimming
- Disability class: S13
Medal record
Women's para swimming
Representing Spain
Paralympic Games
Bronze medal – third place	2024 Paris	Mixed 4×100 m freestyle relay 49pts
World Championships
Silver medal – second place	2023 Manchester	Mixed 4×100 m freestyle relay 49pts
Silver medal – second place	2025 Singapore	Mixed 4×100 m medley relay 49pts
European Championships
Silver medal – second place	2024 Funchal	50 m freestyle S13
Silver medal – second place	2024 Funchal	100 m freestyle S13
Silver medal – second place	2026 Kocaeli	400 m freestyle S13}
Bronze medal – third place	2026 Kocaeli	100 m freestyle S13}

Emma Feliu Martin (born 31 October 2003) is a Spanish Paralympic swimmer. She represented Spain at the 2024 Summer Paralympics.

== Career ==
In April 2024, Feliu competed at the 2024 World Para Swimming European Open Championships and won silver medals in the 50 metres and 100 metres S13 events. She then represented Spain at the 2024 Summer Paralympics and won a bronze medal in the mixed 4x100 metre freestyle relay 49pts event.
