= María Delgado =

Spanish Paralympic swimmer

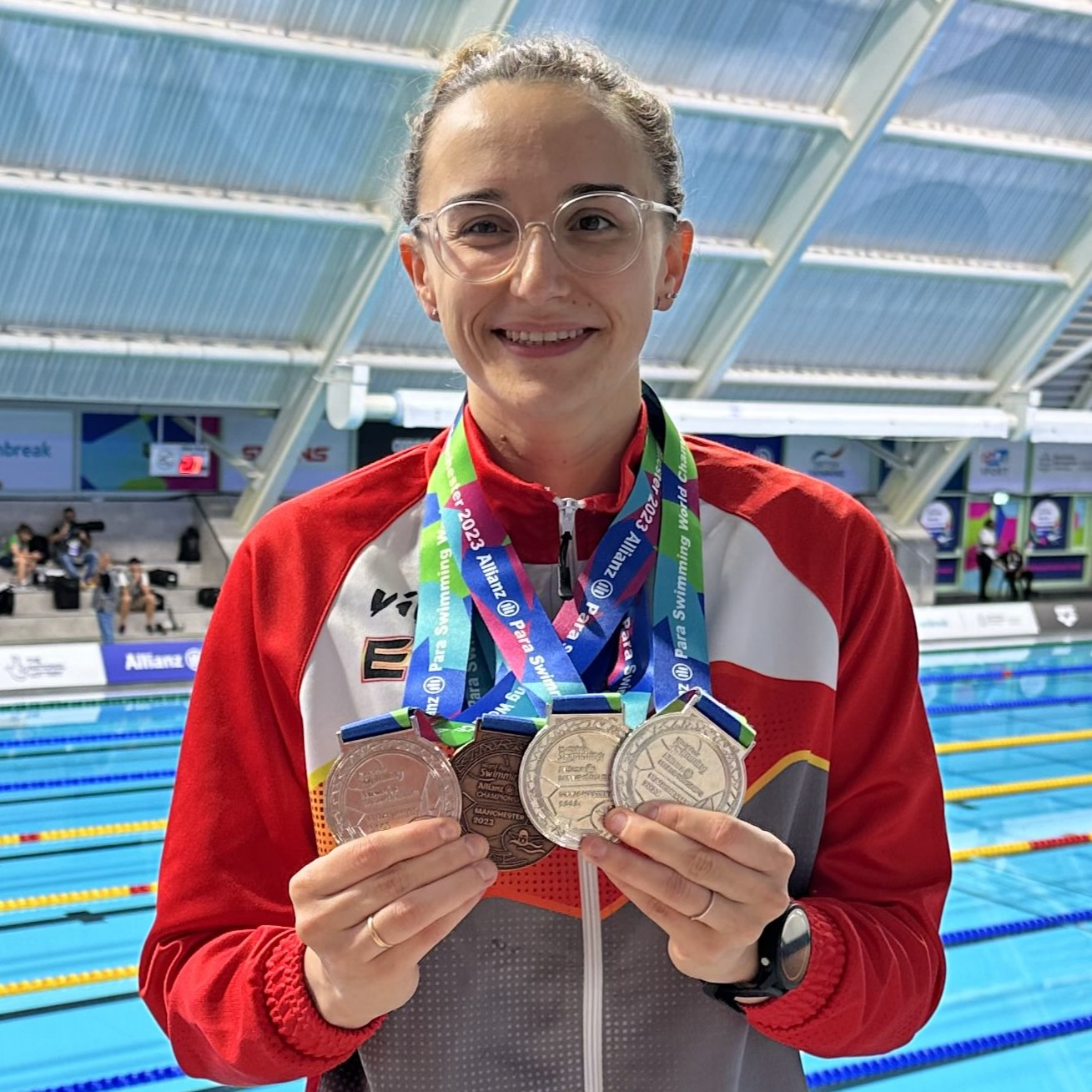

Personal information
- Full name: María Delgado Nadal
- Nationality: Spain
- Born: 8 October 1997 (age 29) Saragossa, Aragón, Spain

Sport
- Sport: Swimming
- Club: Aragua AD
Medal record
Women's para swimming
Representing Spain
Paralympic Games
Bronze medal – third place	2016 Rio de Janeiro	100m backstroke S12
Bronze medal – third place	2016 Rio de Janeiro	50m freestyle S12
Bronze medal – third place	2024 Paris	100 m backstroke S12
Bronze medal – third place	2024 Paris	Mixed 4×100 m freestyle relay 49pts
World Championships
Gold medal – first place	2025 Singapore	100 m butterfly S12
Gold medal – first place	2025 Singapore	Mixed 4×100 m freestyle relay 49pts
Bronze medal – third place	2015 Glasgow	100m backstroke S12
Bronze medal – third place	2023 Manchester	100m backstroke S12
European Championships
Silver medal – second place	2026 Kocaeli	100m butterfly S13
Bronze medal – third place	2014 Eindhoven	100m butterfly S12
Bronze medal – third place	2014 Eindhoven	200m individual medley SM12

María Delgado Nadal (born 8 October 1997) is a blind Paralympic swimmer from Spain who has competed in several national and international championships.

== Early life ==
Delgado is from the Aragon region of Spain. She has a vision impairment called congenital toxoplasmosis. As a result of the condition, she only has peripheral vision since she was born.

== Career ==
Delgado is an S12 classified swimmer, and is a member of the Aragua AD swimming club. She is affiliated with ONCE.

Delgado competed at the 2010 Spanish Age Swimming Championships for blind and visually impaired, where she finished first in all but one of the races she competed in. The remaining race she finished third in. In 2010, she competed at the Paralympic Swimming Championship of Spain by Autonomous Communities, where she won two bronze medals while representing Aragon.

Competing at the 2011 Paralympic Swimming Championship of Spain by Autonomous Communities, Delgado earned a gold medal in the 50 meter backstroke and another in the 100 meter freestyle. She also earned a silver in the 100 meter backstroke and a bronze in 50 meter freestyle. In 2011, she competed in the swimming component of the Sports Association Championships Aragón Aragua. She competed at the 2011 National Olympiad in the under-16 group.

Delgado was part of project AXA in 2012, which is a program designed to help develop young Spanish sportspeople into elite athletes on the international level. She took part in a camp in December run by the program which put an emphasis on the technical aspects of swimming. By that year, she was considered a potential competitor at the 2016 Summer Paralympics. In 2012, she competed at the Paralympic Swimming Championship of Spain by Autonomous Communities, where she finished third in the women's S12 100m butterfly event. That year, she also competed in the age championships where she earned a gold medal in the 100 meter butterfly and a silver in the 100 freestyle.

In 2013, Delgado trained with the CAR Higher Sports Council in Madrid alongside 25 other sportspeople. She competed at the 2013 Paralympic Swimming Championship of Spain by Autonomous Communities, where she won a pair of silver medals. She competed at the 2013 Swimming Championship of Catalonia, hosted by the Sabadell Swimming Club, where she was one of nine Spanish swimmers to set a qualifying time for the World Championships. As a 15-year-old, she competed at the 2013 IPC Swimming World Championships in Montreal, Canada in the 100 backstroke, 100 butterfly, 100 free and 200 medley. In preparation for the competition, she trained at the High Performance Center in Madrid. Her goal going into the competition was to gain competitive experience in preparation for the 2016 Summer Paralympics.

In September 2025 at the 2025 World Para Swimming Championships in Singapore, Delgado won the gold medal in the Women’s 100 m Butterfly S12. Later in the same championships she was a member of the Spanish team that won gold in the Mixed 4×100 m Freestyle 49 pts relay.
