= 2025 World Para Swimming Championships – Women's 100 metre backstroke =

The Women's 100 metre backstroke events at the 2025 World Para Swimming Championships were held at the Singapore Aquatic Centre between 21 and 27 September 2025.

== Schedule ==
100 metre backstroke events for women will be held across the following schedule:

women's 100 metre backstroke
Day	Date	Classifications
Day 1	21 Sept	S6; S12
Day 2	22 Sept	S8; S14
Day 3	23 Sept	S2
Day 4	24 Sept	S7; S13
Day 5	25 Sept	
Day 6	26 Sept	S9; S11
Day 7	27 Sept	S10

== Medal summary ==
Event	Gold	Silver	Bronze
S2; Details	Diana Koltsova; Individual Neutral Athletes	Yip Pin Xiu; Singapore	Angela Procida; Italy
S6; Details	Yuyan Jiang; China	Nora Meister; Switzerland	Anna Hontar; Ukraine
S7; Details	Veronika Korzhova; Ukraine	Danielle Dorris; Canada	Mallory Weggemann; United States
S8; Details	Alice Tai; Great Britain	Viktoriia Ishchiulova; Individual Neutral Athletes	Mira Jeanne Maack; Germany
S9; Details	Mariana Ribeiro; Brazil	Núria Marquès; Spain	Mary Jibb; Canada
S10; Details	Defne Kurt; Turkey	Katie Cosgriffe; Canada	Bianka Pap; Hungary
S11; Details	Daria Lukianenko; Individual Neutral Athletes	Varvara Kniazeva; Individual Neutral Athletes	Anastasiia Shevchenko; Individual Neutral Athletes
S12; Details	Carol Santiago; Brazil	Ela Letton-Jones; Great Britain	Astrid Carroll; Great Britain
S13; Details	Gia Pergolini; United States	Róisín Ní Ríain; Ireland	Carlotta Gilli; Italy
S14; Details	Poppy Maskill; Great Britain	Bethany Firth; Great Britain	Georgia Sheffield; Great Britain

== Race summaries ==
=== S2 ===
The women's 100 metre backstroke S2 event will be held on 23 September. Twelve swimmers will take part, with the top eight progressing to the final. Swimmers under the S1 classification are eleigible for this event.

The relevant records at the beginning of the event were as follows:

Record	Athlete	Time	City	Country
S1
World	Ingrid Thunem (NOR)	02:25.6	Kristiansand	Norway
Americas	Eden Schroeder (USA)	03:43.0	Indianapolis	United States
European	Ingrid Thunem (NOR)	02:25.6	Kristiansand	Norway
S2
World	Pin Xiu Yip (SGP)	2:07.09	Rio de Janeiro	Brazil
Championship	Pin Xiu Yip (SGP)	2:15.16	Funchal	Portugal
Americas	Haidee Viviana Aceves Perez (MEX)	02:21.8	Paris	France
Asian	Pin Xiu Yip (SGP)	02:07.1	Rio de Janeiro	Brazil
European	Ganna Ielisavetska (UKR)	02:16.3	Eindhoven	Netherlands

==== Heats ====
Rank	Heat	Lane	Athlete	Class	Result	Notes
1	2	4	Yip Pin Xiu (SGP)	S2	2:20.37	Q
2	2	3	Arjola Trimi (ITA)	S2	2:27.72	Q
3	2	5	Angela Procida (ITA)	S2	2:31.11	Q
4	1	3	Fabiola Ramírez (MEX)	S2	2:31.23	Q
5	1	4	Haideé Aceves (MEX)	S2	2:36.47	Q
6	1	5	Diana Koltsova (AIN)	S2	2:38.32	Q
7	1	2	Ebrar Bilge (TUR)	S2	3:11.60	Q
8	2	2	Katarina Draganov-Cordas (SRB)	S2	3:26.60	Q
9	1	6	Zsanett Adami-Rozsa (HUN)	S2	3:33.56	
10	2	5	Elif Ildem (TUR)	S1	3:39.83	
11	1	7	Areti Aravela Spyridou (GRE)	S2	3:52.63	
	2	6	Teresa Perales (ESP)	S2		DNS

==== Final ====
Rank	Lane	Athlete	Class	Result	Notes
1st place, gold medalist(s)	7	Diana Koltsova (AIN)	S2	2:19.60	
2nd place, silver medalist(s)	4	Yip Pin Xiu (SGP)	S2	2:23.73	
3rd place, bronze medalist(s)	3	Angela Procida (ITA)	S2	2:32.32	
4	6	Fabiola Ramírez (MEX)	S2	2:32.41	
5	2	Haideé Aceves (MEX)	S2	2:33.18	
6	5	Arjola Trimi (ITA)	S2	2:34.42	
7	1	Ebrar Bilge (TUR)	S2	3:12.33	
8	8	Katarina Draganov-Cordas (SRB)	S2	3:48.28	

=== S6 ===
The women's 100 metre backstroke S6 event will be held on 21 September. Eight swimmers will take part in a direct final. The relevant records at the beginning of the event were as follows:

Record	Athlete	Time	City	Country
World	Jiang Yuyan (CHN)	1:19.44	Paris	France
Championship	Shelby Newkirk (CAN)	1:20.62	Manchester	United Kingdom
African	Caitlin Botha (NAM)	03:27.9	Limoges	France
Americas	Ellie Marks (USA)	01:19.6	Tokyo	Japan
Asian	Jiang Yuyan (CHN)	01:19.4	Paris	France
European	Verena Schott (GER)	01:21.2	Tokyo	Japan
Oceania	Tiffany Thomas Kane (AUS)	01:29.3	Glasgow	United Kingdom

==== Final ====
Rank	Lane	Athlete	Time	Note
1st place, gold medalist(s)	4	Jiang Yuyan (CHN)	1:20.13	CR
2nd place, silver medalist(s)	6	Nora Meister (SUI)	1:24.47	
3rd place, bronze medalist(s)	3	Anna Hontar (UKR)	1:25.02	
4	5	Verena Schott (GER)	1:26.35	
5	2	Zhu Ji (CHN)	1:26.90	
6	7	Natalya Zvyagintseva (KAZ)	1:37.74	
7	1	Gabriele Cepaviciute (LTU)	1:42.11	
8	8	Shay Bar Nitzan (ISR)	1:43.58	

=== S7 ===
The women's 100 metre backstroke S7 event will be held on 24 September.

The relevant records at the beginning of the event were as follows:

Record	Athlete	Time	City	Country
World	Julia Gaffney (USA)	1:19.47	Indianapolis	United States
Championship	Ellie Marks (USA)	1:20.60	London	United Kingdom
African	Ann Wacuka (KEN)	02:31.4	Nairobi	Kenya
Americas	Julia Gaffney (USA)	01:19.5	Indianapolis	United States
Asian	Ke Liting (CHN)	01:22.7	Rio de Janeiro	Brazil
European	Kirsten Bruhn (GER)	01:21.6	Sheffield	United Kingdom
Oceania	Jacqueline Freney (AUS)	01:22.8	London	United Kingdom

==== Heats ====
Thirteen swimmers will take part, with the top eight progressing to the final

Rank	Heat	Lane	Athlete	Class	Time	Notes
1	2	5	Danielle Dorris (CAN)	S7	1:22.13	Q
2	2	4	Veronika Korzhova (UKR)	S7	1:22.25	Q
3	1	3	Mallory Weggemann (USA)	S7	1:24.13	Q
4	1	4	Julia Gaffney (USA)	S7	1:24.91	Q
5	1	5	Sara Vargas Blanco (COL)	S7	1:25.90	Q
6	2	6	Leyre Orti Campos (ESP)	S7	1:30.37	Q
7	1	6	Signe Bergqvist (SWE)	S7	1:31.82	Q
8	2	7	Anna Bogatyreva (AIN)	S7	1:32.05	Q
9	2	3	Nicola St Clair Maitland (SWE)	S7	1:32.33	
10	2	1	Ng Cheuk Yan (HKG)	S7	1:37.05	
11	2	2	Siomha Nic Bradaigh (IRL)	S7	1:37.26	
12	1	2	Sara Miranda Corrales (CRC)	S7	1:38.26	
	1	7	Somellera Mandujan (MEX)	S7	DNS	

==== Final ====
Rank	Lane	Athlete	Time	Notes
1st place, gold medalist(s)	5	Veronika Korzhova (UKR)	1:22.10	
2nd place, silver medalist(s)	4	Danielle Dorris (CAN)	1:23.10	
3rd place, bronze medalist(s)	3	Mallory Weggemann (USA)	1:23.61	
4	2	Sara Vargas Blanco (COL)	1:24.10	
5	6	Julia Gaffney (USA)	1:24.37	
6	7	Leyre Orti Campos (ESP)	1:30.55	
7	1	Signe Bergqvist (SWE)	1:32.85	
8	8	Anna Bogatyreva (AIN)	1:33.44	

=== S8 ===
The women's 100 metre backstroke S8 event will be held on 22 September. The relevant records at the beginning of the event were as follows:

Record	Athlete	Time	City	Country
World	Alice Tai (GBR)	1:08.04	London	United Kingdom
Championship	Alice Tai (GBR)	1:08.04	London	United Kingdom
African	Husnah Kukundakwe (UGA)	01:34.2	Sheffield	United Kingdom
Americas	Jessica Long (USA)	01:17.6	Eindhoven	Netherlands
Asian	Zheng Tingting (CHN)	01:19.0	Paris	France
European	Alice Tai (GBR)	01:08.0	London	United Kingdom
Oceania	Tupou Neiufi (NZL)	01:15.4	London	United Kingdom

==== Heats ====
Ten swimmers will take part, with the top eight progressing to the final

Rank	Heat	Lane	Athlete	Time	Note
1	1	4	Alice Tai (GBR)	1:19.19	Q
2	1	5	Viktoriia Ishchiulova (AIN)	1:19.22	Q
3	1	6	Tingting Zheng (CHN)	1:20.19	Q
4	1	3	Mira Jeanne Maack (GER)	1:20.66	Q
5	1	1	Hui Zhu (CHN)	1:21.92	Q
6	1	7	Alexandra Borska (CZE)	1:22.23	Q
7	1	8	Paola Ruvalcaba (MEX)	1:25.90	Q
8	1	9	Paula Novina (CRO)	1:26.50	Q
9	1	0	Vendula Duskova (CZE)	1:29.01	R
10	1	2	Xenia Francesca Palazzo (ITA)	1:36.33	R

==== Final ====
Rank	Lane	Athlete	Time	Note
1st place, gold medalist(s)	4	Alice Tai (GBR)	1:13.04	
2nd place, silver medalist(s)	5	Viktoriia Ishchiulova (AIN)	1:16.36	
3rd place, bronze medalist(s)	6	Mira Jeanne Maack (GER)	1:19.38	
4	3	Tingting Zheng (CHN)	1:19.65	
5	2	Hui Zhu (CHN)	1:20.87	
6	7	Alexandra Borska (CZE)	1:21.83	
7	8	Paula Novina (CRO)	1:25.82	
8	1	Paola Ruvalcaba (MEX)	1:26.08	

=== S9 ===
The women's 100 metre backstroke S9 event will be held on 26 September.

The relevant records at the beginning of the event were as follows:

Record	Athlete	Time	City	Country
World	Sophie Pascoe (NZL)	1:07.41	Auckland	New Zealand
Championship	Sophie Pascoe (NZL)	1:07.49	London	United Kingdom
African	Natalie Du Toit (RSA)	01:09.8	Eindhoven	Netherlands
Americas	Christie Raleigh-Crossley (USA)	01:07.9	Paris	France
Asian	Liu Ying (CHN)	01:12.9	Paris	France
European	Alice Tai (GBR)	01:07.7	Sheffield	United Kingdom
Oceania	Sophie Pascoe (NZL)	01:07.4	Auckland	New Zealand

==== Heats ====
Eleven swimmers will take part, with the top eight progressing to the final,

Rank	Heat	Lane	Athlete	Class	Time	Notes
1	1	4	Nuria Marques Soto (ESP)	S9	1:10.97	Q
2	2	4	Mariana Ribeiro (BRA)	S9	1:11.37	Q
3	2	3	Ying Liu (CHN)	S9	1:12.57	Q
4	1	5	Mary Jibb (CAN)	S9	1:13.07	Q
5	2	5	Beatriz Lerida Maldonado (ESP)	S9	1:13.20	Q
6	1	3	Emma Mecic (CRO)	S9	1:14.08	Q
7	2	6	Elena Kliachkina (AIN)	S9	1:14.65	Q
8	1	2	Aleksandra Ochtera (POL)	S9	1:16.49	Q
9	1	6	Johanne Froekjaer (DEN)	S9	1:17.07	
10	2	7	Ema Maeda (JPN)	S9	1:18.94	
11	2	2	Vittoria Bianco (ITA)	S9	1:20.20	

==== Final ====
Rank	Lane	Athlete	Time	Notes
1st place, gold medalist(s)	5	Mariana Ribeiro (BRA)	1:08.79	
2nd place, silver medalist(s)	4	Nuria Marques Soto (ESP)	1:09.01	
3rd place, bronze medalist(s)	6	Mary Jibb (CAN)	1:10.63	
4	3	Ying Liu (CHN)	1:11.95	ASR
5	2	Beatriz Lerida (ESP)	1:13.50	
6	7	Emma Mecic (CRO)	1:14.37	
7	1	Elena Kliachkina (AIN)	1:14.68	
8	8	Aleksandra Ochtera (POL)	1:15.32	

=== S10 ===
The women's 100 metre backstroke S10 event will be held on 27 September. Nine swimmers will take part, with the top eight progressing to the final.

The relevant records at the beginning of the event were as follows:

Record	Athlete	Time	City	Country
World	Summer Mortimer (NED)	1:05.86	Glasgow	United Kingdom
Championship	Summer Mortimer (NED)	1:05.86	Glasgow	United Kingdom
African	Shireen Sapiro (RSA)	01:09.0	London	United Kingdom
Americas	Summer Mortimer (CAN)	01:05.9	London	United Kingdom
Asian	Chen Yi (CHN)	01:12.2	Paris	France
European	Summer Mortimer (NED)	01:05.9	Glasgow	United Kingdom
Oceania	Sophie Pascoe (NZL)	01:06.0	Montreal	Canada

==== Heats ====
Rank	Heat	Lane	Athlete	Class	Time	Notes
1	1	7	Defne Kurt (TUR)	S10	1:07.82	Q
2	1	5	Katie Cosgriffe (CAN)	S10	1:08.08	Q
3	1	4	Bianka Pap (HUN)	S10	1:08.99	Q
4	1	3	Jasmine Greenwood (AUS)	S10	1:11.19	Q
5	1	6	Emeline Pierre (FRA)	S10	1:11.38	Q
6	1	2	Taylor Winnett (USA)	S10	1:14.02	Q
7	1	1	Arianna Hunsicker (CAN)	S10	1:18.21	Q
8	1	8	Freja Kvist (DEN)	S10	1:19.52	Q
9	1	0	Nini Geladze (GEO)	S10	1:27.37	

==== Final ====
Rank	Lane	Athlete	Time	Notes
1st place, gold medalist(s)	4	Defne Kurt (TUR)	1:06.95	
2nd place, silver medalist(s)	5	Katie Cosgriffe (CAN)	1:07.37	
3rd place, bronze medalist(s)	3	Bianka Pap (HUN)	1:07.85	
4	6	Jasmine Greenwood (AUS)	1:10.26	
5	2	Emeline Pierre (FRA)	1:10.82	
6	7	Taylor Winnett (USA)	1:13.17	
7	1	Arianna Hunsicker (CAN)	1:15.59	
8	8	Freja Kvist (DEN)	1:19.35	

=== S11 ===
The women's 100 metre backstroke event will be held on 26 September. Nine swimmers will take part, with the top eight progressing to the final. The relevant records at the beginning of the event were as follows:

Record	Athlete	Time	City	Country
World	Cai Liwen (CHN)	1:13.46	Tokyo	Japan
Championship	Wang Xinyi (CHN)	1:15.20	Manchester	United Kingdom
African	Renette Bloem (RSA)	01:43.0	Eindhoven	Netherlands
Americas	Analuz Pellitero (ARG)	01:17.6	Manchester	United Kingdom
Asian	Cai Liwen (CHN)	01:13.5	Tokyo	Japan
European	Daria Lukianenko (IPC)	01:16.6	Paris	France
Oceania	Mary Fisher (NZL)	01:18.0	Rio de Janeiro	Brazil

==== Heats ====
Rank	Heat	Lane	Athlete	Class	Time	Notes
1	1	1	Varvara Kniazeva (AIN)	S11	1:16.06	Q EUR
2	1	2	Kateryna Tkachuk (UKR)	S11	1:20.03	Q
3	1	7	Anastasiia Shevchenko (AIN)	S11	1:20.06	Q
4	1	4	Daria Lukianenko (AIN)	S11	1:20.41	Q
5	1	3	Tomomi Ishiura (JPN)	S11	1:20.78	Q
6	1	6	Analuz Pellitero (ARG)	S11	1:25.19	Q
7	1	8	Martina Rabbolini (ITA)	S11	1:26.80	Q
8	1	5	Jia Ma (CHN)	S11	1:27.04	Q
9	1	0	Sophie Jin Wen Soon (SGP)	S11	1:30.84	

==== Final ====
Rank	Lane	Athlete	Time	Notes
1st place, gold medalist(s)	6	Daria Lukianenko (AIN)	1:16.80	
2nd place, silver medalist(s)	4	Varvara Kniazeva (AIN)	1:16.94	
3rd place, bronze medalist(s)	3	Anastasiia Shevchenko (AIN)	1:21.14	
4	5	Kateryna Tkachuk (UKR)	1:21.41	
5	7	Analuz Pellitero (ARG)	1:22.27	
6	2	Tomomi Ishiura (JPN)	1:22.66	
7	8	Jia Ma (CHN)	1:23.32	
8	1	Martina Rabbolini (ITA)	1:25.17	

=== S12 ===
The women's 100 metre backstroke S12 event will be held on 21 September. Eight swimmers will take part in a direct final.

The relevant records at the beginning of the event were as follows:

Record	Athlete	Time	City	Country
World	Hannah Russell (GBR)	1:06.06	Rio de Janeiro	Brazil
Championship	Daria Pikalova (RUS)	1:06.75	Glasgow	United Kingdom
Americas	Carol Santiago (BRA)	01:08.2	Paris	France
Asian	Zhu Yonggang (CHN)	01:08.9	Athens	Greece
European	Hannah Russell (GBR)	01:06.1	Rio de Janeiro	Brazil
Oceania	Jenna Jones (AUS)	01:12.3	Manchester	United Kingdom

==== Final ====
Rank	Lane	Athlete	Time	Note
1st place, gold medalist(s)	4	Carol Santiago (BRA)	1:09.42	
2nd place, silver medalist(s)	3	Ela Letton-Jones (GBR)	1:12.44	
3rd place, bronze medalist(s)	2	Astrid Carroll (GBR)	1:12.97	
4	5	Maria Delgado Nadal (ESP)	1:13.35	
5	6	Ayano Tsujiuchi (JPN)	1:14.45	
6	7	Karina Petrikovicova (SVK)	1:15.70	
7	1	Naomi Maike Schwarz (GER)	1:16.72	
8	8	Jietong Zheng (CHN)	1:19.23	

=== S13 ===
The women's 100 metre backstroke event will be held on 24 September. Seven swimmers will take part in a direct final. The relevant records at the beginning of the event were as follows:

Record	Athlete	Time	City	Country
World	Gia Pergolini (USA)	1:04.64	Tokyo	Japan
Championship	Gia Pergolini (USA)	1:04.80	Funchal	Portugal
African	Danika Vyncke (RSA)	01:24.3	Manchester	United Kingdom
Americas	Gia Pergolini (USA)	01:04.6	Tokyo	Japan
Asian	Nigorakhon Mirzokhidova (UZB)	01:06.4	Singapore	Singapore
European	Carlotta Gilli (ITA)	01:05.6	Funchal	Portugal
Oceania	Katja Dedekind (AUS)	01:06.0	Funchal	Portugal

==== Final ====
Rank	Lane	Athlete	Class	Result	Notes
1st place, gold medalist(s)	4	Gia Pergolini (USA)	S13	1:05.49	
2nd place, silver medalist(s)	5	Róisín Ní Ríain (IRL)	S13	1:06.26	
3rd place, bronze medalist(s)	3	Carlotta Gilli (ITA)	S13	1:07.87	
4	6	Aleksandra Ziablitseva (AIN)	S13	1:11.09	
5	2	Danika Vyncke (RSA)	S13	1:15.99	AF
6	1	Thea Lokebo (NOR)	S13	1:23.56	
7	7	Mubinabonu Khalilova (UZB)	S13	1:25.21	

=== S14 ===
The women's 100 metre backstroke S14 event will be held on 22 September. ten swimmers will take part, with the top eight progressing from heats to the final.

The relevant records at the beginning of the event were as follows:

Record	Athlete	Time	City	Country
World	Bethany Firth (GBR)	1:04.05	Rio de Janeiro	Brazil
Championship	Bethany Firth (GBR)	1:05.80	Manchester	United Kingdom
European	Bethany Firth (GBR)	1:04.05	Rio de Janeiro	Brazil

==== Heats ====
Rank	Heat	Lane	Athlete	Time	Note
1	1	5	Bethany Firth (GBR)	1:07.18	Q
2	1	3	Georgia Sheffield (GBR)	1:07.63	Q
3	1	4	Poppy Maskill (GBR)	1:09.59	Q
4	1	2	Ana Karolina Soares (BRA)	1:10.73	Q
5	1	6	Valeriia Shabalina (AIN)	1:11.61	Q
6	1	7	Emma van Dyk (CAN)	1:12.17	Q
7	1	8	Nattharinee Khajhonmatha (THA)	1:12.64	Q
8	1	1	Citli Siloe Salinas Rojas (MEX)	1:13.78	Q
9	1	0	Mikika Serizawa (JPN)	1:14.59	R

==== Final ====
Rank	Lane	Athlete	Time	Note
1st place, gold medalist(s)	6	Poppy Maskill (GBR)	1:05.09	
2nd place, silver medalist(s)	4	Bethany Firth (GBR)	1:05.54	
3rd place, bronze medalist(s)	5	Georgia Sheffield (GBR)	1:06.27	
4	2	Valeriia Shabalina (AIN)	1:08.90	
5	3	Ana Karolina Soares (BRA)	1:10.96	
6	7	Emma Van Dyk (CAN)	1:12.27	
7	8	Nattharinee Khajhonmatha (THA)	1:12.56	
8	1	Citli Siloe Salinas Rojas (MEX)	1:14.07	
