= 2019 World Para Swimming Championships – Women's 100 metre backstroke =

The women's 100m backstroke events at the 2019 World Para Swimming Championships were held in the London Aquatics Centre at the Queen Elizabeth Olympic Park in London, between 9–15 September.

== Medalists ==
Event	Gold	Silver	Bronze
S2	Yip Pin Xiu; Singapore	Aly van Wyck-Smart; Canada	Angela Procida; Italy
S6	Verena Schott; Germany	Song Lingling; China	Jiang Yuyan; China
S7	Elizabeth Marks; United States	Shelby Newkirk; Canada	Nora Meister; Switzerland
S8	Alice Tai; Great Britain	Tupou Neiufi; New Zealand	Megan Richter; Great Britain
S9	Sophie Pascoe; New Zealand	Ellie Cole; Australia	Elizabeth Smith; United States
S10	Lisa Kruger; Netherlands	Bianka Pap; Hungary	Aurelie Rivard; Canada
S11	Wang Xinyi; China	Kateryna Tkachuk; Ukraine	Maryna Piddubna; Ukraine
S12	Anna Krivshina; Russia	Maria Carolina Gomes Santiago; Brazil	Maria Delgado Nadal; Spain
S13	Carlotta Gilli; Italy	Gia Pergolini; United States	Nigorakhon Mirzokhidova; Uzbekistan
S14	Bethany Firth; Great Britain	Valeriia Shabalina; Russia	Jessica-Jane Applegate; Great Britain
