= Natirat Meeprom =

Thai para swimmer (born 2006)

Personal information
- Nationality: Thai
- Born: 14 October 2006 (age 19) Thailand

Sport
- Sport: Para swimming
- Disability class: S14, SM14
Medal record
Men's para swimming
Representing Thailand
World Championships
Bronze medal – third place	2025 Singapore	Mixed 4×100 m freestyle relay S14
Bronze medal – third place	2025 Singapore	Mixed 4×100 m medley relay S14

Natirat "Natural" Meeprom (born 14 October 2006) is a Thai para swimmer. He is a two-time medalist at the World Para Swimming Championships.

== Career ==
In June 2025, Natirat competed in Para Swimming World Series Mexico, where he won the 100m backstroke.

Natirat competed in four events at the 2025 World Para Swimming Championships. He won the bronze medal in the mixed 4 × 100 metre freestyle relay S14 alongside Phakhawat Kumarasing, Nattharinee Khajhonmatha and Wachiraphon Thavornvasu. The quartet also won the bronze medal at the mixed 4 × 100 metre medley relay S14 event.
