= Wachiraphon Thavornvasu =

Thai para swimmer

Personal information
- Nationality: Thai
- Born: Thailand

Sport
- Sport: Para swimming
- Disability class: S14, SM14
Medal record
Women's para swimming
Representing Thailand
World Championships
Bronze medal – third place	2025 Singapore	Mixed 4×100 m freestyle relay S14
Bronze medal – third place	2025 Singapore	Mixed 4×100 m medley relay S14

Wachiraphon Thavornvasu is a Thai para swimmer. She is a two-time medalist at the World Para Swimming Championships.

== Career ==
Wachiraphon competed in three events at the 2025 World Para Swimming Championships. She won the bronze medal in the mixed 4 × 100 metre freestyle relay S14 alongside Phakhawat Kumarasing, Natirat Meeprom and Nattharinee Khajhonmatha. The quartet also won the bronze medal at the mixed 4 × 100 metre medley relay S14 event.
