= 2025 World Para Swimming Championships – Women's 400 metre freestyle =

The women's 400 m freestyle events at the 2025 World Para Swimming Championships were held at the Singapore Aquatic Centre between 21 and 27 September 2025.

== Schedule ==
Women's 400 m freestyle events will be held across the following schedule:

women's 400 metre freestyle
Day	Date	Classifications
Day 1	21 Sept	S8
Day 2	22 Sept	S7
Day 3	23 Sept	S10
Day 4	24 Sept	S6
Day 5	25 Sept	S9
Day 6	26 Sept	S13
Day 7	27 Sept	S11

== Medal summary ==
Event	Gold	Silver	Bronze
S6; Details	Jiang Yuyan; China	Nora Meister; Switzerland	Zhu Ji; China
S7; Details	Morgan Stickney; United States	Chloe Osborn; Australia	Ahalya Lettenberger; United States
S8; Details	Alice Tai; Great Britain	Brock Whiston; Great Britain	Nahia Zudaire Borrezo; Spain
S9; Details	Lakeisha Patterson; Australia	Emma Mečić; Croatia	Zsófia Konkoly; Hungary
S10; Details	Faye Rogers; Great Britain	Bianka Pap; Hungary	Oliwia Jablonska; Poland
S11; Details	Daria Lukianenko; Individual Neutral Athletes	Liesette Bruinsma; Netherlands	Zhang Xiaotong; China
S13; Details	Olivia Chambers; United States	Róisín Ní Ríain; Ireland	Grace Nuhfer; United States

== Race summaries ==
=== S6 ===
The women's 400 metre freestyle S6 event was held on 24 September. Seven swimmers took part in a straight final.

The relevant records at the beginning of the event were as follows:

Record	Athlete	Time	City	Country
World	Jiang Yuyan (CHN)	5:04.57	Tokyo	Japan
Championship	Jiang Yuyan (CHN)	5:13.32	London	United Kingdom
African	Ayaallah Tewfick (EGY)	05:59.5	Funchal	Portugal
Americas	Ellie Marks (USA)	05:19.6	Indianapolis	United States
Asian	Jiang Yuyan (CHN)	05:04.6	Tokyo	Japan
European	Yelyzaveta Mereshko (UKR)	05:12.6	Tokyo	Japan
Oceania	Tanya Huebner (AUS)	06:49.9	Edmonton, Alberta	Canada

==== Final ====
Rank	Lane	Athlete	Class	Result	Notes
1st place, gold medalist(s)	4	Jiang Yuyan (CHN)	S6	5:10.68	CR
2nd place, silver medalist(s)	5	Nora Meister (SUI)	S6	5:12.39	ER
3rd place, bronze medalist(s)	6	Zhu Ji (CHN)	S6	5:46.16	
4	3	Evelin Szaraz (HUN)	S6	5:52.51	
5	2	Ayaallah Tewfick (EGY)	S6	6:19.07	
	7	Gabriele Cepaviciute (LTU)	S6		DNS

=== S7 ===
The women's 400 metre freestyle S7 event will be held on 22 September. Eleven swimmers will take part, with the top eight proceeding to the final.

The relevant records at the beginning of the event were as follows:

Record	Athlete	Time	City	Country
World	Morgan Stickney (USA)	4:51.50	Minneapolis	United States
Championship	Morgan Stickney (USA)	4:54.28	Manchester	United Kingdom
Americas	Morgan Stickney (USA)	04:51.5	Minneapolis	United States
Asian	Chen Shuling (CHN)	05:27.9	London	United Kingdom
European	Giulia Terzi (ITA)	05:05.8	Naples	Italy
Oceania	Jacqueline Freney (AUS)	04:59.0	London	United Kingdom

==== Heats ====
Rank	Heat	Lane	Athlete	Class	Result	Notes
1	2	4	Morgan Stickney (USA)	S7	5:06.16	Q
2	2	5	Chloe Osborn (AUS)	S7	5:22.97	Q
3	1	4	Ahalya Lettenberger (USA)	S7	5:27.15	Q
4	2	3	Chen Shuling (CHN)	S7	5:36.74	Q
5	1	3	Anna Bogatyreva (AIN)	S7	5:37.22	Q
6	2	6	Veronika Korzhova (UKR)	S7	5:59.17	Q
7	1	6	Leyre Orti Campos (ESP)	S7	5:55.19	Q
8	1	5	Naomi Alejandra Ortiz Mendez (MEX)	S7	5:58.06	Q
9	1	2	Siomha Nic Bradaigh (IRL)	S7	6:06.71	
10	2	7	Sara Miranda Corrales (CRC)	S7	6:12.36	
	2	2	Nicola St Clair Maitland (SWE)	S7		DNS

==== Final ====
Rank	Lane	Athlete	Class	Result	Notes
1st place, gold medalist(s)	4	Morgan Stickney (USA)	S7	4:58.82	
2nd place, silver medalist(s)	5	Chloe Osborn (AUS)	S7	5:18.94	
3rd place, bronze medalist(s)	3	Ahalya Lettenberger (USA)	S7	5:22.54	
4	6	Chen Shuling (CHN)	S7	5:29.40	
5	2	Anna Bogatyreva (AIN)	S7	5:34.18	
6	8	Veronika Korzhova (UKR)	S7	5:36.98	
7	7	Leyre Orti Campos (ESP)	S7	5:56.03	
8	1	Naomi Alejandra Ortiz Mendez (MEX)	S7	6:00.22	

=== S8 ===
The women's 400 metre freestyle S8 event was held on 21 September. Thirteen swimmers took part, with the top eight proceeding to the final.

The relevant records at the beginning of the event were as follows:

Record	Athlete	Time	City	Country
World	Lakeisha Patterson (AUS)	4:40.33	Rio de Janeiro	Brazil
Championship	Jessica Long (USA)	4:43.76	Montreal	Canada
Americas	Jessica Long (USA)	4:40.4	Toronto, Ont.	Canada
Asian	Zheng Tingting (CHN)	5:00.2	Paris	France
European	Heather Frederiksen (GBR)	4:45.7	Ponds Forge, Sheffield	United Kingdom
Oceania	Lakeisha Patterson (AUS)	4:40.3	Rio de Janeiro	Brazil

==== Heats ====
The heats take place at 9:07 a.m. on the 21 September.

Rank	Heat	Lane	Athlete	Class	Result	Notes
1	1	5	Brock Whiston (GBR)	S8	5:08.83	Q
2=	1	3	Nahia Zudaire Borrezo (ESP)	S8	5:09.84	Q
2=	1	4	Alice Tai (GBR)	S8	5:09.84	Q
4	2	4	Jessica Long (USA)	S8	5:10.43	Q
5	2	3	Zheng Tingting (CHN)	S8	5:11.29	Q
6	2	5	Xenia Francesca Palazzo (ITA)	S8	5:20.24	Q
7	2	2	Vendula Duskova (CZE)	S8	5:22.78	Q
8	1	2	Abi Tripp (CAN)	S8	5:24.49	Q
9	2	7	Paula Novina (CRO)	S8	5:24.87	
10	2	6	Paola Ruvalcaba (MEX)	S8	5:25.17	
11	1	6	Mariia Pavlova (AIN)	S8	5:38.91	
12	2	1	Alexandra Borska (CZE)	S8	5:39.87	
13	1	7	Ana Castro (POR)	S8	5:42.20	

==== Final ====
Rank	Lane	Athlete	Result	Notes
1st place, gold medalist(s)	5	Alice Tai (GBR)	4:59.00	
2nd place, silver medalist(s)	4	Brock Whiston (GBR)	4:59.21	
3rd place, bronze medalist(s)	3	Nahia Zudaire Borrezo (ESP)	5:03.69	
4	7	Xenia Francesca Palazzo (ITA)	5:04.47	
5	2	Zheng Tingting (CHN)	5:11.29	
6	6	Jessica Long (USA)	5:13.60	
7	8	Abi Tripp (CAN)	5:19.68	
8	1	Vendula Duskova (CZE)	5:22.35	

=== S9 ===
The women's 400 metre freestyle S9 event was held on 25 September. Twelve swimmers took part, with the top eight proceeding to the final.

The relevant records at the beginning of the event were as follows:

Record	Athlete	Time	City	Country
World	Natalie Du Toit (RSA)	4:23.81	Beijing	China
Championship	Natalie Du Toit (RSA)	4:27.76	Durban	South Africa
African	Natalie Du Toit (RSA)	04:23.8	Beijing	China
Americas	Stephanie Dixon (CAN)	04:39.7	Beijing	China
Asian	Xu Jialing (CHN)	04:43.7	Rio de Janeiro	Brazil
European	Zsofia Konkoly (HUN)	04:36.8	Tokyo	Japan
Oceania	Lakeisha Patterson (AUS)	04:36.7	Tokyo	Japan

==== Heats ====
Rank	Heat	Lane	Athlete	Class	Result	Notes
1	2	5	Emma Mečić (CRO)	S9	4:45.40	Q
2	1	4	Lakeisha Patterson (AUS)	S9	4:48.15	Q
3	2	6	Mary Jibb (CAN)	S9	4:50.61	Q
4	1	6	Xu Jialing (CHN)	S9	4:52.44	Q
5	1	5	Vittoria Bianco (ITA)	S9	4:52.64	Q
6	2	4	Zsófia Konkoly (HUN)	S9	4:52.71	Q
7	1	3	Agathe Pauli (FRA)	S9	4:54.11	Q
8	2	2	Keegan Knott (USA)	S9	4:58.01	Q
9	2	7	Yuliya Gordiychuk (ISR)	S9	5:02.75	
10	1	7	Galina Basnayake (SRI)	S9	5:08.47	
11	2	3	Nuria Marques Soto (ESP)	S9	5:17.64	
12	1	2	Beatriz Lerida Maldonado (ESP)	S9	5:24.88	

==== Final ====
Rank	Lane	Athlete	Class	Result	Notes
1st place, gold medalist(s)	5	Lakeisha Patterson (AUS)	S9	4:39.40	
2nd place, silver medalist(s)	4	Emma Mečić (CRO)	S9	4:42.55	
3rd place, bronze medalist(s)	7	Zsófia Konkoly (HUN)	S9	4:48.77	
4		Vittoria Bianco (ITA)	S9	4:49.83	
5	3	Mary Jibb (CAN)	S9	4:50.14	
6	1	Agathe Pauli (FRA)	S9	4:51.13	
7	6	Xu Jialing (CHN)	S9	4:54.90	
8	8	Keegan Knott (USA)	S9	5:01.71	

=== S10 ===
The women's 400 metre freestyle S10 event will be held on 23 September. Seven swimmers will take part in a direct final.

The relevant records at the beginning of the event were as follows:

Record	Athlete	Time	City	Country
World	Aurelie Rivard (CAN)	4:24.08	Tokyo	Japan
Championship	Oliwia Jablonska (POL)	4:29.65	London	United Kingdom
African	Shireen Sapiro (RSA)	04:59.5	London	United Kingdom
Americas	Aurelie Rivard (CAN)	04:24.1	Tokyo	Japan
Asian	Chen Yi (CHN)	04:47.3	Jakarta	Indonesia
European	Oliwia Jablonska (POL)	04:29.6	London	United Kingdom
Oceania	Monique Murphy (AUS)	04:35.1	Rio de Janeiro	Brazil

==== Final ====
Rank	Lane	Athlete	Time	Note
1st place, gold medalist(s)	5	Faye Rogers (GBR)	4:32.34	
2nd place, silver medalist(s)	3	Bianka Pap (HUN)	4:36.26	
3rd place, bronze medalist(s)	4	Oliwia Jablonska (POL)	4:40.63	
4	1	Taylor Winnett (USA)	4:49.17	
5	7	Csenge Hotz (HUN)	4:49.68	
6	6	Poppy Wilson (AUS)	4:50.64	
7	2	Silvana Lopez Moreno (MEX)	4:56.16	

=== S11 ===
The women's 400 metre freestyle S11 event was held on 27 September. Six swimmers took part in a direct final.

The relevant records at the beginning of the event were as follows:

Record	Athlete	Time	City	Country
World	Anastasia Pagonis (USA)	4:54.49	Tokyo	Japan
Championship	Liesette Bruinsma (NED)	5:02.19	London	United Kingdom
African	Renette Bloem (RSA)	06:49.1	Edmonton, Alberta	Canada
Americas	Anastasia Pagonis (USA)	04:54.5	Tokyo	Japan
Asian	Zhang Xiaotong (CHN)	05:03.4	Paris	France
European	Liesette Bruinsma (NED)	05:00.4	Paris	France
Oceania	Mary Fisher (NZL)	05:22.1	London	United Kingdom

==== Final ====
Rank	Lane	Athlete	Class	Result	Notes
1st place, gold medalist(s)	3	Daria Lukianenko (AIN)	S11	4:58.46	CR
2nd place, silver medalist(s)	4	Liesette Bruinsma (NED)	S11	5:05.26	
3rd place, bronze medalist(s)	5	Zhang Xiaotong (CHN)	S11	5:14.03	
4	7	Varvara Kniazeva (AIN)	S11	5:21.09	
5	6	Matilde Estefania Alcazar Figueroa (MEX)	S11	5:35.19	
6	2	Analuz Pellitero (ARG)	S11	5:42.69	

=== S13 ===
The women's 400 metre freestyle S13 event was held on 26 September. Eleven swimmers took part, with the top eight proceeding to the final.

The relevant records at the beginning of the event were as follows:

Record	Athlete	Time	City	Country
World	Rebecca Meyers (USA)	4:19.59	Rio de Janeiro	Brazil
Championship	Rebecca Meyers (USA)	4:21.66	Glasgow	United Kingdom
African	Alani Ferreira (RSA)	05:00.8	Funchal	Portugal
Americas	Rebecca Meyers (USA)	04:19.6	Rio de Janeiro	Brazil
Asian	Shokhsanamkhon Toshpulatova (UZB)	04:34.4	London	United Kingdom
European	Anna Stetsenko (UKR)	04:23.0	Berlin	Germany
Oceania	Katja Dedekind (AUS)	04:34.7	Funchal	Portugal

==== Heats ====
Rank	Heat	Lane	Athlete	Class	Result	Notes
1	2	4	Olivia Chambers (USA)	S13	4:38.87	Q
2	2	5	Roisin Ni Riain (IRL)	S13	4:48.48	Q
3	1	6	Alani Ferreira (RSA)	S13	4:54.47	Q, AM
4	2	3	Grace Nuhfer (USA)	S13	4:49.63	Q
5	1	3	Ariadna Edo Beltran (ESP)	S13	4:52.74	Q
6	1	5	Emma Feliu Martin (ESP)	S13	4:53.68	Q
7	2	6	Aleksandra Ziablitseva (AIN)	S13	4:53.87	Q
8	2	2	Danika Vyncke (RSA)	S13	5:07.23	Q
9	1	2	Thea Lokebo (NOR)	S13	5:29.42	
10	2	7	Zhang Ziyue (CHN)	S13	5:57.43	
	1	4	Carlotta Gilli (ITA)	S13		DSQ

==== Final ====
Rank	Lane	Athlete	Class	Result	Notes
1st place, gold medalist(s)	4	Olivia Chambers (USA)	S13	4:31.43	
2nd place, silver medalist(s)	5	Róisín Ní Ríain (IRL)	S13	4:37.79	
3rd place, bronze medalist(s)	3	Grace Nuhfer (USA)	S13	4:43.78	
4	7	Aleksandra Ziablitseva (AIN)	S13	4:46.04	
5	2	Emma Feliu Martin (ESP)	S13	4:46.27	
6	6	Ariadna Edo Beltran (ESP)	S13	4:51.58	
7	1	Alani Ferreira (RSA)	S13	4:56.05	
8	8	Danika Vyncke (RSA)	S13	5:05.55	
