= 2025 World Para Swimming Championships – Women's 50 metre breaststroke =

The women's 50 metre breaststroke events at the 2025 World Para Swimming Championships will be held at the Singapore Aquatic Centre between 21 and 27 September 2025.

== Schedule ==
Women's 50 m backstroke events will be held across the following schedule:

Women's 50 metre breaststroke
Day	Date	Classifications
Day 1	21 Sept	SB2; SB3
Day 2	22 Sept	
Day 3	23 Sept	
Day 4	24 Spt	
Day 5	25 Sept	
Day 6	26 Sept	
Day 7	27 Sept	

== Medal summary ==
Event	Gold	Silver	Bronze
SB2	Tanja Scholz; Germany	Ellie Challis; Great Britain	Diana Koltsova; Individual Neutral Athletes
SB3	Monica Boggioni; Italy	Mira Larionova; Individual Neutral Athletes	Patricia Pereira dos Santos; Brazil

== Race summaries ==
=== SB2 ===
The women's 50 metre breaststroke SB2 event will be held on 21 September.

The relevant records at the beginning of the event were as follows:

Record	Athlete	Time	City	Country
World	Ellie Challis (GBR)	1:04.33	Funchal	Portugal
Championship	Ellie Challis (GBR)	1:04.33	Funchal	Portugal
Americas	Haidee Viviana Aceves Perez (MEX)	01:25.2	Montreal	Canada
Asian	Xia Jiangbo (CHN)	01:06.4	Glasgow	United Kingdom
European	Ellie Challis (GBR)	01:04.3	Funchal	Portugal
Oceania	Tracy Barrell (AUS)	01:51.8	Barcelona	Spain

==== Heats ====
Ten swimmers will take part, with the top eight proceeding to the final.

Rank	Heat	Lane	Athlete	Time	Note
1	1	2	Tanja Scholz (GER)	1:02.27	Q WR
2	1	4	Ellie Challis (GBR)	1:11.28	Q
3	1	6	Veronika Guirenko (ISR)	1:20.48	Q
4	1	5	Diana Koltsova (AIN)	1:20.96	Q
5	1	7	Domiziana Mecenate (ITA)	1:25.55	Q
6	1	8	Teresa Perales (ESP)	1:32.24	Q CR
7	1	1	Angela Procida (ITA)	1:34.67	Q
8	1	0	Aly Van Wyck-Smart (CAN)	1:49.61	Q
9	1	9	Lova Johansson (SWE)	2:20.15	R

==== Final ====
Rank	Lane	Athlete	Time	Note
1st place, gold medalist(s)	4	Tanja Scholz (GER)	1:00.95	WR
2nd place, silver medalist(s)	5	Ellie Challis (GBR)	1:10.39	
3rd place, bronze medalist(s)	6	Diana Koltsova (AIN)	1:14.36	
4	3	Veronika Guirenko (ISR)	1:19.60	
5	2	Domiziana Mecenate (ITA)	1:24.04	
6	7	Teresa Perales (ESP)	1:28.76	CR
7	1	Angela Procida (ITA)	1:30.86	
8	8	Aly Van Wyck-Smart (CAN)	1:45.04	

=== SB3 ===
The women's 50 metre breaststroke SB3 event will be held on 21 September.

The relevant records at the beginning of the event were as follows:

Record	Athlete	Time	City	Country
World	Cheng Jiao (CHN)	0:52.65	Mexico City	Mexico
Championship	Cheng Jiao (CHN)	0:52.65	Mexico City	Mexico
African	Kat Swanepoel (RSA)	00:57.2	Manchester	United Kingdom
Americas	Leanne Smith (USA)	00:55.3	Funchal	Portugal
Asian	Cheng Jiao (CHN)	00:52.6	Mexico City	Mexico
European	Monica Boggioni (ITA)	00:53.2	Paris	France
Oceania	Rachael Watson (AUS)	01:08.2	Rio de Janeiro	Brazil

==== Heats ====
Twelve swimmers will take part, with the top eight proceeding to the final.

Rank	Heat	Lane	Athlete	Time	Note
1	2	4	Monica Boggioni (ITA)	55.72	Q WR
2	1	4	Mira Larionova (AIN)	56.78	Q
3	2	5	Patricia Pereira (BRA)	57.57	Q
4	2	3	Marta Fernandez Infante (ESP)	57.85	Q
5	1	5	Hanna Polishchuk (UKR)	58.30	Q
6	2	6	Maryna Verbova (UKR)	59.11	Q
7	1	3	Lidia Vieira da Cruz (BRA)	1:03.70	Q
8	1	6	Zoia Shchurova (AIN)	1:05.96	Q
9	2	2	Monique Schacher (SUI)	1:09.94	R
10	1	2	Patricia Valle Benitez (MEX)	1:10.40	R
11	2	7	Anastasiia Goncharova (AIN)	1:12.90	
12	1	7	Zulfiya Gabidullina (KAZ)	1:15.33	

==== Final ====
Rank	Lane	Athlete	Time	Note
1st place, gold medalist(s)	4	Monica Boggioni (ITA)	53.95	
2nd place, silver medalist(s)	5	Mira Larionova (AIN)	56.33	
3rd place, bronze medalist(s)	3	Patricia Pereira (BRA)	57.70	
4	6	Marta Fernandez Infante (ESP)	57.71	
5	2	Hanna Polishchuk (UKR)	57.84	
6	7	Maryna Verbova (UKR)	58.33	
7	1	Lidia Vieira da Cruz (BRA)	1:02.02	
8	8	Zoia Shchurova (AIN)	1:05.12	
