= Kylian Portal =

French Paralympic swimmer

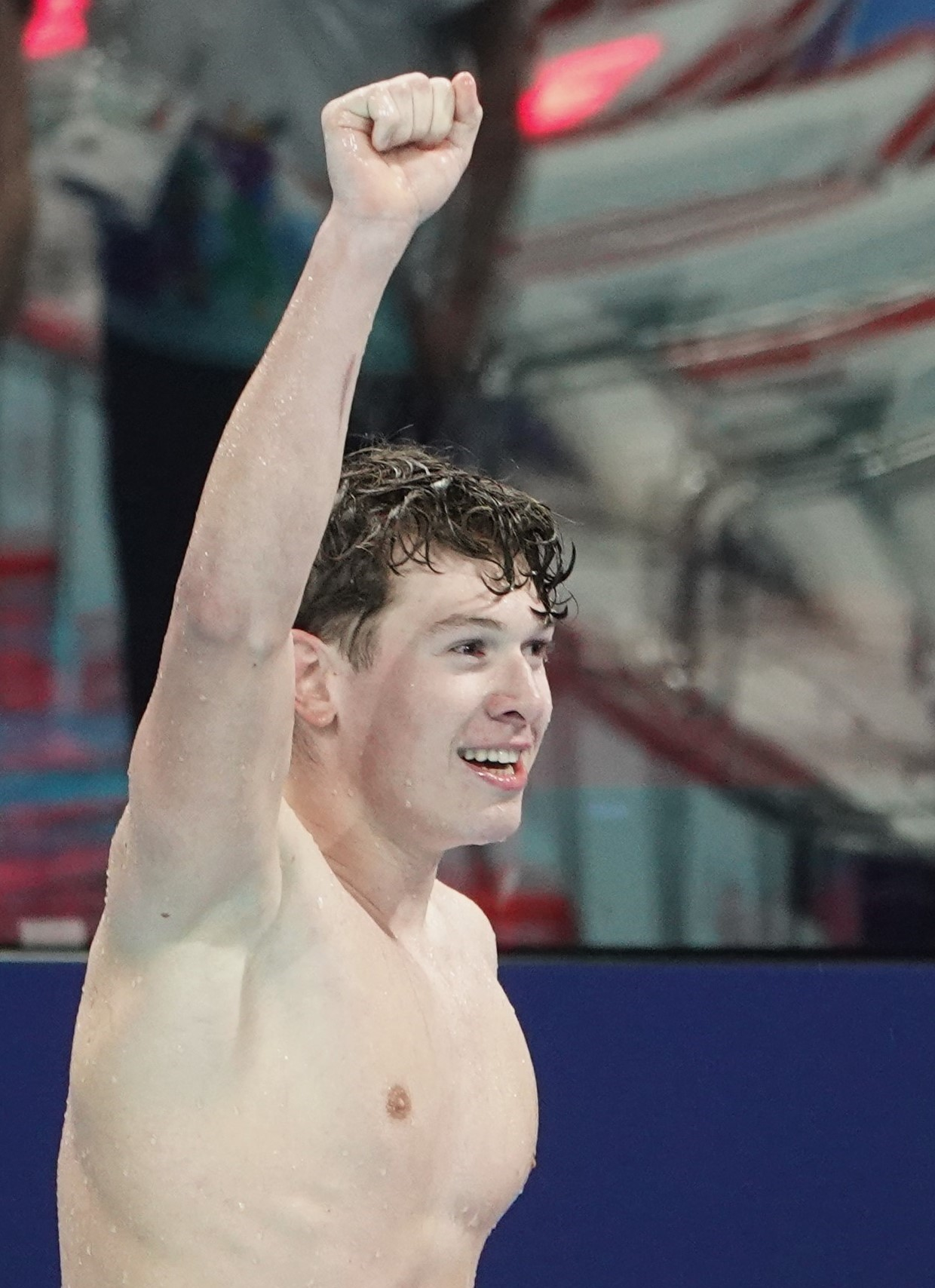
- Portal at the 2024 Summer Paralympics

Personal information
- Born: 28 November 2006 (age 19) Le Chesnay, France

Sport
- Sport: Swimming
- Classifications: S13
Medal record
Men's para swimming
Representing France
Paralympic Games
Bronze medal – third place	2024 Paris	400 m freestyle S13
World Championships
Gold medal – first place	2025 Singapore	100 m butterfly S12
Gold medal – first place	2025 Singapore	100 m freestyle S12
Bronze medal – third place	2025 Singapore	400 m freestyle S13

Kylian Portal (born 28 November 2006) is a French para swimmer. He competed at the 2024 Summer Paralympics and won a bronze medal in the men's 400m freestyle S13, behind his brother Alex, who won silver.

== Biography ==
Portal was born on 28 November 2006 in Le Chesnay, France. He and his older brother Alex were both born with ocular albinism, a condition resulting in poor eyesight; Kylian also has nystagmus and photophobia. Following in the footsteps of his older brother, Portal began swimming at a young age. He started swimming competitively at age seven or eight, as a member of the club Cercle des nageurs de l'ouest in Saint-Germain-en-Laye, along with his brother. He initially competed against non-disabled swimmers.

Portal began competing in para swimming in 2019. He competes in the S13 classification. Portal competed at the 2022 European Youth Championships, winning four total medals – two gold (100m freestyle, 100m butterfly) and two silver (400m freestyle, 200m medley). He participated at the 2022 World Para Swimming Championships with his brother, placing fourth in the men's 400m freestyle (behind his brother, who won silver) and ninth in his heat in the 200m individual medley. He returned for the 2023 World Para Swimming Championships and won the bronze medal in the 400m, with his brother taking the gold medal in the event.

Portal attended the Saint-Augustin high school and received a scientific baccalauréat one year early. He began attending the business school Ecole de Management Léonard De Vinci in 2023, at 17 years old.

In December 2023, Portal and his brother received scholarships from the city of Saint-Germain-en-Laye for €5,000. In 2024, a sign was installed at the entrance of the city to celebrate the two brothers' accomplishments. Both were selected to compete at the 2024 Summer Paralympics in Paris. At the Paralympics, Portal won the bronze medal in the 400m freestyle S13 event, one spot behind his brother, who won silver.
