= Gia Pergolini =

American para swimmer (born 2004)

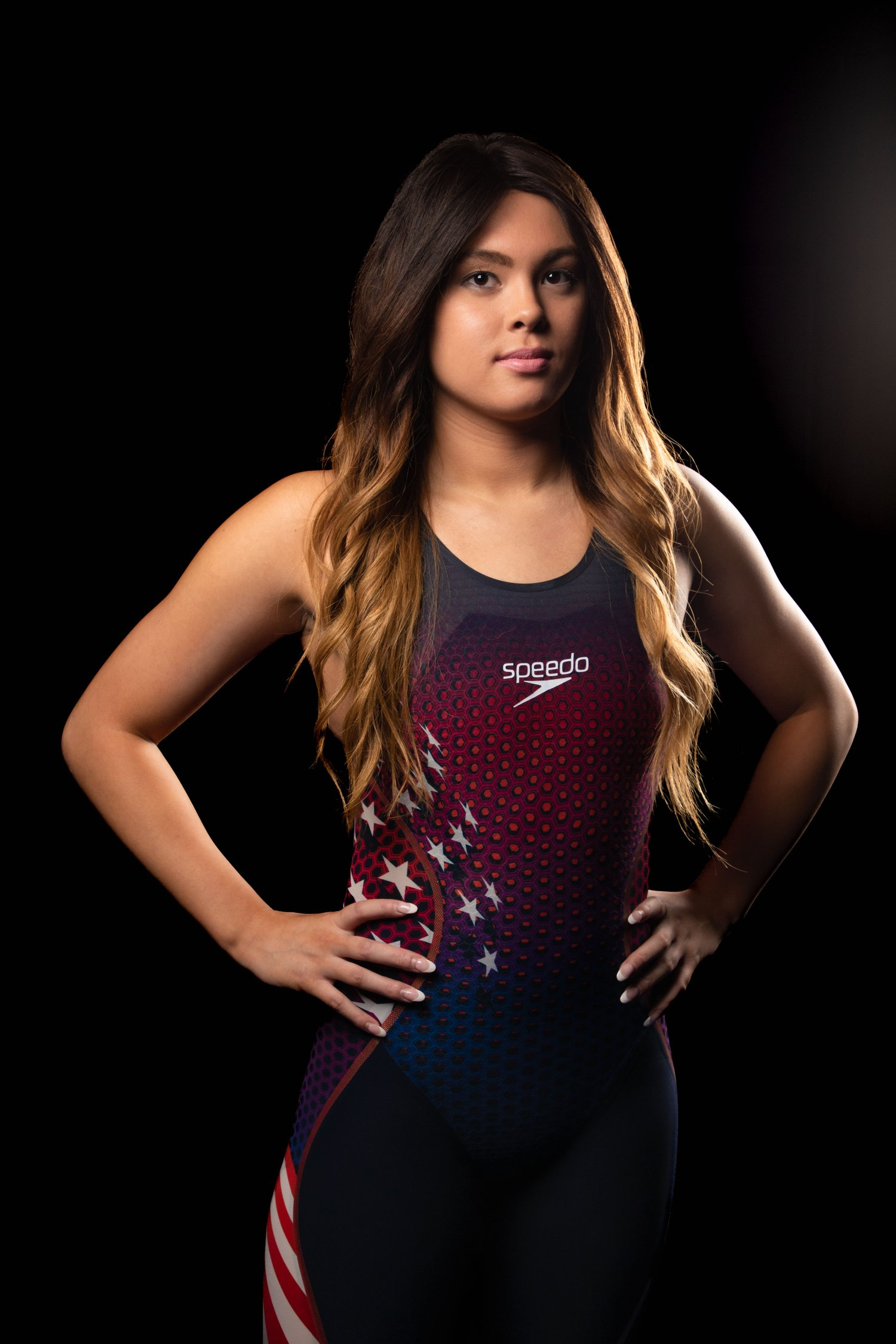
- Pergolini in 2021

Personal information
- Born: February 3, 2004 (age 22) Atlanta, Georgia, U.S.

Sport
- Sport: Para swimming
- Disability: Stargardt disease
- Disability class: S13
- University team: FIU (2022–present)
- Club: Dynamo Swim Club
- Coached by: Nick Graves
Medal record
Women's para swimming
Representing United States
Paralympic Games
Gold medal – first place	2020 Tokyo	100 m backstroke S13
Gold medal – first place	2024 Paris	100 m backstroke S13
Silver medal – second place	2024 Paris	50 m freestyle S13
World Championships
Gold medal – first place	2022 Madeira	100 m freestyle S13
Gold medal – first place	2022 Madeira	100 m backstroke S13
Gold medal – first place	2025 Singapore	100 m backstroke S13
Gold medal – first place	2025 Singapore	50 m freestyle S13
Silver medal – second place	2017 Mexico City	100 m backstroke S13
Silver medal – second place	2019 London	100 m backstroke S13
Silver medal – second place	2022 Madeira	100 m butterfly S13
Silver medal – second place	2022 Madeira	50 m freestyle S13
Bronze medal – third place	2022 Madeira	200 m ind. medley SM13

Gia Pergolini (born February 3, 2004) is an American para swimmer. She represented the United States at the 2020 and 2024 Summer Paralympics.

== Early life and education ==
A native of Atlanta, Georgia, Pergolini has attended Florida International University since 2022 where she is a part of the swimming and diving team.

== Swimming career ==
Pergolini made her international debut at the 2017 World Para Swimming Championships where she won a silver medal in the 100 metre backstroke S13. She again represented the United States at the 2019 World Para Swimming Championships where she won a silver medal in the 100 metre backstroke S13. During the 2018 U.S. Paralympics Swimming Para National Championships, she set the American record in the 100 metre backstroke S13 with a time of 1:07.97.

Pergolini, just 17 years old, competed in the 100 metre backstroke S13 event at the 2020 Summer Paralympics where she set a world record with a time of 1:05.05 in the qualifying heats. She broke the world record again in the finals with a time of 1:04.64, winning the gold medal.

On April 14, 2022, Pergolini was named to the roster to represent the United States at the 2022 World Para Swimming Championships.

On June 30, 2024, Pergolini was named to team USA's roster to compete at the 2024 Summer Paralympics. At the Paralympics she won a gold medal in the 100 metre backstroke S13, and a silver medal in the 50 metre freestyle S13 events. This was Team USA's first gold medal of the games.

She competed at the 2025 World Para Swimming Championships and won gold medals in the 50 metre freestyle S13 and 100 metre backstroke S13 events.
