= Brock Whiston =

British Paralympic swimmer

Personal information
- Born: 19 November 1996 (age 29) Romford, England, Great Britain

Sport
- Country: Great Britain
- Sport: Paralympic swimming
- Disability: Hemiplegia
- Disability class: S8, SB8, SM8
- Club: Barking and Dagenham Aquatics Club
- Coached by: Stewart Nicklin
Medal record
Paralympic swimming
Representing Great Britain
Paralympic Games
Gold medal – first place	2024 Paris	200 m ind. medley SM8
Silver medal – second place	2024 Paris	100 m breaststroke SB8
World Championships
Gold medal – first place	2019 London	100 m breaststroke SB8
Gold medal – first place	2019 London	200 m ind. medley SM8
Gold medal – first place	2019 London	4x100 m freestyle relay 34pts
Gold medal – first place	2019 London	4x100 m medley relay 34pts
Gold medal – first place	2025 Singapore	200 m ind. medley SM8
Silver medal – second place	2025 Singapore	400 m freestyle S8
Silver medal – second place	2025 Singapore	100 m breaststroke SB8
Bronze medal – third place	2025 Singapore	100 m butterfly S8

Brock Whiston (born 19 November 1996) is a British Paralympic swimmer who competes in international level events.

== Career ==
Whiston is a four-time world record holder including beating a seven year old 200 metre individual medley world record by almost five seconds which had been previously held by Jessica Long.
