= Liuying =

Liuying may refer to the following places:

- Liouying District (alternately Liuying), a district in Tainan, Taiwan
- Liuying railway station, a railway station in Liouying (Liuying), Tainan, Taiwan
- Liuying Subdistrict, a subdistrict of Qiaoxi, Hebei Province, China

== See also ==
- Liu Ying (disambiguation)
