= Liu Ying =

Liu Ying may refer to:

- Liu Ying (210–188 BC), posthumously known as the Emperor Hui of Han
- Ruzi Ying (5–25), emperor of the Chinese Western Han dynasty
- Liu Ying (prince) (died 71 AD), son of Emperor Guangwu of Han
- Liu Ying (revolutionary) (1905-1942), a Chinese revolutionary, military political commissar, and senior Chinese Communist Party (CCP) leader.
- Liu Ying (writer) (born 1974), Chinese writer
- Liu Ying (cyclist) (born 1985), Chinese cross-country mountain bike racer
- Liu Ying (figure skater) (born 1975), Chinese figure skater
- Liu Ying (footballer) (born 1974), Chinese footballer
- Ying Liu (engineer) (Chinese: 刘英, born 1977), Chinese professor of electrical engineering

== See also ==
- Liuying (disambiguation)
