= Arthur Xavier Ribeiro =

Brazilian Paralympic swimmer (born 2007)

Personal information
- Nationality: Brazilian
- Born: 18 January 2007 (age 19)

Sport
- Sport: Para swimming
- Disability class: S14
Medal record
Men's para swimming
Representing Brazil
Paralympic Games
Bronze medal – third place	2024 Paris	Mixed 4×100 m freestyle S14
World Championships
Silver medal – second place	2025 Singapore	Mixed 4×100 m freestyle relay S14
Silver medal – second place	2025 Singapore	Mixed 4×100 m medley relay S14

Arthur Xavier Ribeiro (born 18 January 2007) is a Brazilian para swimmer. He represented Brazil at the 2024 Summer Paralympics.

== Career ==
He represented Brazil at the 2024 Summer Paralympics and won a bronze medal in the mixed 4 × 100 metre freestyle relay S14 event.

He competed at the 2025 World Para Swimming Championships and won silver medals in the mixed 4 × 100 metre medley relay S14 and mixed 4 × 100 metre freestyle relay S14 events.
