= Diana Koltsova =

Russian para swimmer (born 2008)

Personal information
- Nationality: Russian
- Born: 3 February 2008 (age 18)

Sport
- Sport: Para swimming
- Disability class: S2, SB2
Medal record
Women's para swimming
Representing Neutral Paralympic Athletes
World Championships
Gold medal – first place	2025 Singapore	100 m backstroke S2
Silver medal – second place	2025 Singapore	50 m backstroke S2
Bronze medal – third place	2025 Singapore	50 m breaststroke SB2
Representing Russia
European Championships
Silver medal – second place	2026 Kocaeli	50 m breaststroke SB2

Diana Koltsova (born 3 February 2008) is a Russian para swimmer. She represented Neutral Paralympic Athletes at the 2024 Summer Paralympics.

== Career ==
Koltsova represented Neutral Paralympic Athletes at the 2024 Summer Paralympics and finished in fourth place in the 100 metre backstroke S2 event, and fifth place in the 50 metre backstroke S2 event.

In September 2025, she competed at the 2025 World Para Swimming Championships and won a gold medal in the 100 metre backstroke S2 event. She also won a bronze medal in the 50 metre breaststroke SB2 event.
