= Swimming at the 2020 Summer Paralympics – Women's 50 metre butterfly S6 =

Women's 50 metre butterfly S6 at the XVI Paralympic Games
- Venue: Tokyo Aquatics Centre
- Dates: 30 August 2021
- Competitors: 15 from 10 nations

Medalists
1st place, gold medalist(s)		Jiang Yuyan	China
2nd place, silver medalist(s)		Nicole Turner	Ireland
3rd place, bronze medalist(s)		Elizabeth Marks	United States

The Women's 50 metre butterfly S6 event at the 2020 Paralympic Games took place on 30 August 2021, at the Tokyo Aquatics Centre.

== Heats ==
The swimmers with the top 8 times, regardless of heat, advanced to the final.

Rank	Heat	Lane	Name	Nationality	Time	Notes
1	2	4	Jiang Yuyan	China	34.56	Q, WR
2	2	5	Nicole Turner	Ireland	36.54	Q
3	1	5	Elizabeth Marks	United States	36.84	Q, AM
4	1	4	Eleanor Robinson	Great Britain	37.24	Q
5	2	7	Sara Vargas Blanco	Colombia	37.80	Q
6	2	3	Verena Schott	Germany	38.16	Q
7	1	3	Liu Daomin	China	38.98	Q
8	2	6	Viktoriia Savtsova	Ukraine	39.98	Q
9	1	6	Anna Hontar	Ukraine	40.00	
10	1	2	Anastasiia Zavalii	Ukraine	41.10	
11	1	7	Grace Harvey	Great Britain	41.18	
12	2	2	Anastasia Diodorova	RPC	41.51	
13	2	8	Nora Meister	Switzerland	41.97	
14	1	1	Trịnh Thị Bích Như	Vietnam	42.60	
15	2	1	Sophia Herzog	United States	42.64	

== Final ==
Rank	Lane	Name	Nationality	Time	Notes
1st place, gold medalist(s)	4	Jiang Yuyan	China	34.69	
2nd place, silver medalist(s)	5	Nicole Turner	Ireland	36.30	
3rd place, bronze medalist(s)	3	Elizabeth Marks	United States	36.83	AM
4	7	Verena Schott	Germany	37.03	
5	6	Eleanor Robinson	Great Britain	37.08	
6	2	Sara Vargas Blanco	Colombia	37.33	
7	1	Liu Daomin	China	38.38	
8	8	Viktoriia Savtsova	Ukraine	41.04	
