= Jiang Yuyan (swimmer) =

Chinese Paralympic swimmer

Personal information
- Born: 2 November 2004 (age 21) Shaoxing, Zhejiang, China

Sport
- Country: China
- Sport: Paralympic swimming
- Disability class: S6
- Event(s): freestyle, butterfly, backstroke
Medal record
Paralympic swimming
Representing China
Paralympic Games
Gold medal – first place	2020 Tokyo	50 m butterfly S6
Gold medal – first place	2020 Tokyo	400 m freestyle S6
Gold medal – first place	2024 Paris	50 m freestyle S6
Gold medal – first place	2024 Paris	100 m freestyle S7
Gold medal – first place	2024 Paris	400 m freestyle S6
Gold medal – first place	2024 Paris	100 m backstroke S6
Gold medal – first place	2024 Paris	50 m butterfly S6
Gold medal – first place	2024 Paris	Mixed 4x50 m freestyle relay 20 pts
Gold medal – first place	2024 Paris	Mixed 4×50 m medley relay 20pts
Silver medal – second place	2020 Tokyo	100 m backstroke S6
Bronze medal – third place	2020 Tokyo	100 m freestyle S7
World Championships
Gold medal – first place	2019 London	50m freestyle S6
Gold medal – first place	2019 London	100 m freestyle S6
Gold medal – first place	2019 London	400 m freestyle S6
Gold medal – first place	2023 Manchester	100 m freestyle S6
Gold medal – first place	2023 Manchester	400 m freestyle S6
Gold medal – first place	2023 Manchester	50 m butterfly S6
Gold medal – first place	2023 Manchester	Mixed 4×50 m medley relay 20pts
Gold medal – first place	2025 Singapore	100 m backstroke S6
Gold medal – first place	2025 Singapore	100 m freestyle S6
Gold medal – first place	2025 Singapore	400 m freestyle S6
Gold medal – first place	2025 Singapore	50 m butterfly S6
Silver medal – second place	2023 Manchester	50 m freestyle S6
Silver medal – second place	2023 Manchester	100 m backstroke S6
Silver medal – second place	2025 Singapore	50 m freestyle S6
Silver medal – second place	2025 Singapore	Mixed 4×100 m freestyle relay 34 pts
Bronze medal – third place	2019 London	50 m butterfly S6
Bronze medal – third place	2019 London	100 m backstroke S6
Asian Para Games
Gold medal – first place	2018 Jakarta	50 m freestyle S6
Gold medal – first place	2018 Jakarta	100 m freestyle S6
Gold medal – first place	2018 Jakarta	50 m butterfly S7
Gold medal – first place	2022 Hangzhou	100 m backstroke S6
Gold medal – first place	2022 Hangzhou	50 m freestyle S6
Gold medal – first place	2022 Hangzhou	400 m freestyle S6
Gold medal – first place	2022 Hangzhou	100 m freestyle S7
Gold medal – first place	2022 Hangzhou	50 m butterfly S6
Gold medal – first place	2022 Hangzhou	4×50 m medley relay
Gold medal – first place	2022 Hangzhou	4×100 m freestyle relay
Silver medal – second place	2018 Jakarta	400 m freestyle S7
Bronze medal – third place	2022 Hangzhou	200 m individual medley

Jiang Yuyan (born 2 November 2004) is a Chinese Paralympic swimmer who competes in the S6 disability class. She was the most decorated athlete at the 2024 Summer Paralympics, winning seven gold medals in total. She is a recipient of the Laureus World Sports Award for Sportsperson of the Year with a Disability. Due to her skill in swimming, she is known by the nickname "flying fish".

== Early life ==
Jiang Yuyan was born on 2 November 2004 in Shaoxing, China. She lost her right arm and leg after she was involved in a car accident when she was three or four years old.

== Sport career ==
In 2018, Yuyan competed at the Asian Para Games held in Jakarta, Indonesia, winning three gold medals in the 50 m freestyle, 100 m freestyle, and 50 m butterfly events, along with a silver medal in the 400 m freestyle event. She was one of the youngest swimmers to participate in the 2019 World Para Swimming Championships where she won three gold medals and two bronze medals. She won one of these gold medals in the women's 50m butterfly S6 event with a world record of 34.56.

In 2021, Yuyan competed at the 2020 Summer Paralympics. She won 4 medals, securing two gold medals in the women's 400 m freestyle S6 and the women's 50m butterfly S6 events, the silver medal in the women's 100 m backstroke S6 event, and the bronze medal in the women's 100 m freestyle S7 event. She competed as the youngest athlete in the delegation at the 2022 Asian Para Games held in Hangzhou, China, winning five individual gold medals, one individual bronze medal, and two gold medals in team events. At the 2023 World Para Swimming Championships, Yuyan set three world records and one Asian record, bringing home four golds and two silver medals.

In 2024, Yuyan competed at the Summer Paralympics held in Paris, France, and she has been the most decorated athlete in the competition, winning 7 golds in total. For her first title, she set a world record of 32.59 seconds in the 50m freestyle S6 event. She secured her fourth gold by breaking another world record in the women's 100m freestyle S7 with a time of 1:09.68. Yuyan secured her seventh and final gold medal at Paris 2024 setting a world record in the women's 100m backstroke S6 event, with a time of 1:19.44. In 2025, Yuyan was awarded the Laureus World Sports Award for Sportsperson of the Year with a Disability.

At the 2025 World Para Swimming Championships in Singapore, Jiang won the women's 100 m backstroke S6 on the opening day. The following day she took the women's 100 m freestyle S6 title in a world-record time of 1:09.58, lowering her previous mark of 1:09.68. By the end of the meet she had seven podium finishes including four golds, one silver and two bronzes.
