= 2025 World Para Swimming Championships – Medley relays =

The mixed medley relay events at the 2025 World Para Swimming Championships will be held at the Singapore Aquatic Centre between 21 and 27 September 2025. Four medley relays will be held.

== Schedule ==
The mixed medleys relays will be held across the following schedule:

mixed medley relays
| Day | Date | Classifications |
|---|---|---|
| Day 1 | 21 Sept | |
| Day 2 | 22 Sept | |
| Day 3 | 23 Sept | Mixed 4x50 m medley relay 20pts |
| Day 4 | 24 Sept | Mixed 4x100 medley relay 49 pts |
| Day 5 | 25 Sept | Mixed 4x100 medley relay 34 pts |
| Day 6 | 26 Sept | Mixed 4x100 medley relay S14 |
| Day 7 | 27 Sept | |

== Medal summary ==
| Event | Gold | Silver | Bronze |
|---|---|---|---|
| Mixed 4 × 100 m medley relay S14 | Great Britain; Poppy Maskill; Harry Stewart; William Ellard; Bethany Firth | Brazil; Arthur Xavier Ribeiro; Beatriz de Araújo; Gabriel Bandeira; Ana Karolina Soares | Thailand; Nattharinee Khajhonmatha; Natirat Meeprom; Phakhawat Kumarasing; Wachiraphon Thavornvasu |
| Mixed 4 × 100 m medley relay 49 pts | Brazil; Carol Santiago; Guilherme Batista Silva; Thomaz Rocha Matera; Lucilene da Silva Sousa | Spain; Albert Gelis; Marian Polo López; Juan Ferrón Gutiérrez; Emma Feliu Martin | Japan; Tomomi Ishiura; Genki Saito; Keiichi Kimura; Ayano Tsujiuchi |
| Mixed 4 × 100 m medley relay 34 pts | Spain; Núria Marquès; Óscar Salguero; Iñigo Llopis Sanz; Anastasiya Dmytriv | Great Britain; Alice Tai; Bruce Dee; Faye Rogers; Roan Brennan | Australia; Thomas Gallagher; Timothy Hodge; Emily Beecroft; Chloe Osborn |
| Mixed 4 × 50 m medley relay 20 pts | Brazil; Samuel de Oliveira; Alessandra Oliveira; Tiago Ferreira; Mayara Petzold | China; Yuan Weiyi; Zhu Ji; He Shenggao; Guo Jincheng | United States; Adin Williams; Katie Kubiak; Morgan Ray; Leanne Smith |

== Race summaries ==
=== Mixed 4 × 100 m medley relay 34 pts ===
This relay will take place on 25 September, and consists of ten teams competing in heats, with the top eight moving forward to the final. The aggregate classifications of teams cannot add up to more than 34. This relay contains higher classification athletes (S6 to S10) , but not those with sight impediments or learning disability.

==== Heats ====
| Rank | Heat | Lane | Athlete | Result | Notes |
|---|---|---|---|---|---|
| 1 | 1 | 4 | Australia (AUS) | 4:36.76 | Q |
| 2 | 1 | 5 | Spain (ESP) | 4:38.03 | Q |
| 3 | 1 | 6 | United States (USA) | 4:40.74 | Q |
| 4 | 1 | 0 | Great Britain (GBR) | 4:44.00 | Q |
| 5 | 1 | 8 | Czech Republic (CZE) | 4:52.54 | Q |
| 6 | 1 | 1 | Canada (CAN) | 4:55.39 | Q |
| | 1 | 3 | China (CHN) | | DSQ |
| | 1 | 2 | France (FRA) | | DSQ |
| | 1 | 9 | Poland (POL) | | DSQ |

==== Final ====
| Rank | Lane | Athlete | Result | Notes |
|---|---|---|---|---|
| 1st place, gold medalist(s) | 5 | Spain (ESP) | 4:31.50 | CR |
| 2nd place, silver medalist(s) | 6 | Great Britain (GBR) | 4:31.65 | |
| 3rd place, bronze medalist(s) | 4 | Australia (AUS) | 4:32.05 | |
| 4 | 3 | United States (USA) | 4:38.33 | |
| 5 | 7 | Canada (CAN) | 4:50.00 | |
| 6 | 2 | Czech Republic (CZE) | 4:53.90 | |

=== Mixed 4 × 100 m medley relay 49 pts ===
This relay took place on 24 September, and consists of four teams in a direct final. The aggregate classifications of teams cannot add up to more than 49. This relay contains athletes with sight impediments (S11 to S13).

==== Final ====
| Rank | Lane | Athlete | Result | Notes |
|---|---|---|---|---|
| 1st place, gold medalist(s) | 1 | Brazil (BRA) | 4:23.48 | WR |
| 2nd place, silver medalist(s) | 4 | Spain (ESP) | 4:25.33 | ER |
| 3rd place, bronze medalist(s) | 3 | Japan (JPN) | 4:37.90 | AS |
| 4 | 6 | China (CHN) | 4:46.90 | |

=== Mixed 4 × 100 m medley relay S14 ===
This relay will take place on 26 September, and consists of four teams in a direct final. This relay contains athletes with intellectual or learning disabilities.

==== Final ====
| Rank | Lane | Athlete | Result | Notes |
|---|---|---|---|---|
| 1st place, gold medalist(s) | 4 | Great Britain (GBR); Poppy Maskill; Harry Stewart; William Ellard; Bethany Firth | 4:02.86 | WR |
| 2nd place, silver medalist(s) | 5 | Brazil (BRA); Arthur Xavier Ribeiro; Beatriz de Araújo; Gabriel Bandeira; Ana Karolina Soares | 4:05.98 | AMR |
| 3rd place, bronze medalist(s) | 3 | Thailand (THA); Nattharinee Khajhonmatha; Natirat Meeprom; Phakhawat Kumarasing; Wachiraphon Thavornvasu | 4:32.74 | |
| 4 | 6 | Singapore (SGP); Danielle Moi; Liang Chan Han; Wei Darren Chan; Jazlene Tan | 5:22.53 | |

=== Mixed 4 × 50 medley relay 20 pts ===
This relay will took on 23 September, and consists of ten teams competing in heats, with the top eight moving forward to the final. The aggregate classifications of teams cannot add up to more than 20. This relay typically contains lower classification athletes up to no higher than S6 or S7.

==== Heats ====
| Rank | Heat | Lane | Athlete | Result | Notes |
|---|---|---|---|---|---|
| 1 | 1 | 3 | Ukraine (UKR) | 2:37.30 | Q |
| 2 | 1 | 5 | United States (USA) | 2:37.34 | Q |
| 3 | 1 | 4 | China (CHN) | 2:38.37 | Q |
| 4 | 1 | 6 | Brazil (BRA) | 2:39.31 | Q |
| 5 | 1 | 7 | Japan (JPN) | 2:52.36 | Q |
| 6 | 1 | 2 | Spain (ESP) | 2:53.69 | Q |
| 7 | 1 | 0 | Poland (POL) | 3:21.45 | Q |
| | 1 | 8 | Kazakhstan (KAZ) | | DSQ |

==== Final ====
| Rank | Lane | Athlete | Result | Notes |
|---|---|---|---|---|
| 1st place, gold medalist(s) | 6 | Brazil (BRA) | 2:30.94 | |
| 2nd place, silver medalist(s) | 3 | China (CHN) | 2:31.62 | |
| 3rd place, bronze medalist(s) | 5 | United States (USA) | 2:36.84 | |
| 4 | 4 | Ukraine (UKR) | 2:37.10 | |
| 5 | 2 | Japan (JPN) | 2:45.71 | |
| 6 | 7 | Spain (ESP) | 2:46.27 | |
| 7 | 1 | Poland (POL) | 3:22.58 | |
