= Swimming at the 2022 Asian Para Games =

Paralympic swimming at the 2022 Asian Para Games
- Venue: Hangzhou Olympic Sports Centre Aquatic Sports Arena
- Location: Hangzhou, China
- Dates: 23–27 October
- Competitors: 269 in 97 Events

Paralympic swimming at the 2022 Asian Para Games was held in Hangzhou, China between 23 and 27 October 2023.

== Final Report ==
1. Entry List:
2. Medalists:
3. Medal Table:
4. Records:

== Medal table ==
141 events was planned but for classifications and shortage of competitors, the number of events was decreased to 97.

* Host nation (China)

| Rank | Nation | Gold | Silver | Bronze | Total |
|---|---|---|---|---|---|
| 1 | China* | 56 | 52 | 42 | 150 |
| 2 | Japan | 19 | 18 | 19 | 56 |
| 3 | Uzbekistan | 4 | 4 | 5 | 13 |
| 4 | Iran | 3 | 5 | 6 | 14 |
| 5 | Hong Kong | 3 | 5 | 3 | 11 |
| 6 | Indonesia | 3 | 1 | 1 | 5 |
| 7 | Singapore | 3 | 1 | 0 | 4 |
| 8 | Kazakhstan | 3 | 0 | 3 | 6 |
| 9 | South Korea | 1 | 6 | 1 | 8 |
| 10 | Vietnam | 1 | 2 | 2 | 5 |
| 11 | Malaysia | 1 | 0 | 4 | 5 |
| 12 | Philippines | 1 | 0 | 3 | 4 |
| 13 | Thailand | 0 | 2 | 5 | 7 |
| 14 | Sri Lanka | 0 | 1 | 1 | 2 |
| 15 | India | 0 | 0 | 1 | 1 |
| Totals (15 entries) | | 98 | 97 | 96 | 291 |

== Medalists ==
=== Men ===
| Event | Class | Gold | Silver | Bronze |
|---|---|---|---|---|
| 50 m freestyle | S4 | Takayuki Suzuki; Japan | Jo Giseong; South Korea | Zou Liankang; China |
| 100 m freestyle | S4 | Takayuki Suzuki; Japan | Jo Giseong; South Korea | Zou Liankang; China |
| 50 m backstroke | S4 | Zou Liankang; China | Jo Giseong; South Korea | Hà Văn Hiệp; Vietnam |
| 50 m freestyle | S5 | Guo Jincheng; China | Wang Lichao; China | Yuan Weiyi; China |
| 100 m freestyle | S5 | Wang Lichao; China | Yuan Weiyi; China | Muhammad Nur Syaiful Zulkafli; Malaysia |
| 200 m freestyle | S5 | Guo Jincheng; China | Wang Lichao; China | Zy Kher Lee; Malaysia |
| 50 m backstroke | S5 | Yuan Weiyi; China | Guo Jincheng; China | Wang Lichao; China |
| 100 m breaststroke | SB4 | Muhammad Nur Syaiful Zulkafli; Malaysia | Yin Wenhong; China | Zy Kher Lee; Malaysia |
| 50 m butterfly | S5 | Wang Lichao; China | Guo Jincheng; China | Yuan Weiyi; China |
| 100 m freestyle | S6 | Luo Jinbiao; China | Jia Hongguang; China | Gary Bejino; Philippines |
| 400 m freestyle | S6 | Tang Qian; China | Luo Jinbiao; China | Gary Bejino; Philippines |
| 100 m backstroke | S6 | Yang Hong; China | Jia Hongguang; China | Wang Jingang; China |
| 100 m breaststroke | SB5 | Lê Tiến Đạt; Vietnam | Đỗ Thanh Hải; Vietnam | Luo Jinbiao; China |
| 50 m butterfly | S6 | Wang Jingang; China | Jia Hongguang; China | Yang Hong; China |
| 200 m individual medley | SM6 | Yang Hong; China | Wang Jingang; China | Jia Hongguang; China |
| 50 m freestyle | S7 | Toh Wei Soong; Singapore | Wang Jingang; China | Huang Xianquan; China |
| 400 m freestyle | S7 | Ernie Gawilan; Philippines | Toh Wei Soong; Singapore | Huang Xianquan; China |
| 100 m backstroke | S7 | Toh Wei Soong; Singapore | Yang Huaqiang; China | Huang Xianquan; China |
| 100 m breaststroke | SB6 | Yang Hong; China | Guo Jincheng; China | Jia Hongguang; China |
| 50 m butterfly | S7 | Toh Wei Soong; Singapore | Huang Xianquan; China | Suyash Jadhav; India |
| 200 m individual medley | SM7 | Huang Xianquan; China | Yang Huaqiang; China | Ernie Gawilan; Philippines |
| 100 m freestyle | S8 | Xu Haijiao; China | Yang Guanglong; China | Wu Hongliang; China |
| 400 m freestyle | S8 | Xu Haijiao; China | Yang Guanglong; China | Wu Hongliang; China |
| 100 m backstroke | S8 | Kota Kubota; Japan | Liu Fengqi; China | Kotaro Ogiwara; Japan |
| 100 m butterfly | S8 | Wu Hongliang; China | Zhou Zhihua; China | Azizbek Boynazarov; Uzbekistan |
| 200 m individual medley | SM8 | Xu Haijiao; China | Yang Guanglong; China | Liu Fengqi; China |
| 50 m freestyle | S9 | Guo Zhi; China | Wang Jie; China | shared silver |
| 50 m freestyle | S9 | Guo Zhi; China | Abolfazl Zarif; Iran | shared silver |
| 400 m freestyle | S9 | Taiyo Kawabuchi; Japan | Yeum Jun-du; South Korea | Naveed Raheem; Sri Lanka |
| 100 m backstroke | S9 | Jendi Pangabean; Indonesia | Wang Jie; China | Abolfazl Negarestani; Iran |
| 100 m breaststroke | SB8 | Xu Haijiao; China | Yang Guanglong; China | Zhou Zhihua; China |
| 100 m butterfly | S9 | Cui Yongjia; China | Wang Jie; China | Taiyo Kawabuchi; Japan |
| 200 m individual medley | SM9 | Wang Jie; China | Taiyo Kawabuchi; Japan | Guo Zhi; China |
| 50 m freestyle | S10 | Sina Zeyghaminejad; Iran | Shahin Izadyar; Iran | Akito Minai; Japan |
| 100 m freestyle | S10 | Sina Zeyghaminejad; Iran | Akito Minai; Japan | Shahin Izadyar; Iran |
| 100 m backstroke | S10 | Dias Kenzhebek; Kazakhstan | Onta Uezono; Japan | Shahin Izadyar; Iran |
| 100 m breaststroke | SB9 | Sina Zeyghaminejad; Iran | Shahin Izadyar; Iran | Lin Furong; China |
| 100 m butterfly | S10 | Akito Minai; Japan | Daiki Kubo; Japan | Lin Furong; China |
| 200 m individual medley | SM10 | Akito Minai; Japan | Sina Zeyghaminejad; Iran | Shahin Izadyar; Iran |
| 50 m freestyle | S11 | Hua Dongdong; China | Keiichi Kimura; Japan | Yang Bozun; China |
| 400 m freestyle | S11 | Uchu Tomita; Japan | Hua Dongdong; China | Zhang Bowen; China |
| 100 m backstroke | S11 | Yang Bozun; China | Zhang Bowen; China | Hua Dongdong; China |
| 100 m breaststroke | SB11 | Yang Bozun; China | Keiichi Kimura; Japan | Zhang Bowen; China |
| 100 m butterfly | S11 | Keiichi Kimura; Japan | Uchu Tomita; Japan | Yang Bozun; China |
| 200 m individual medley | SM11 | Uchu Tomita; Japan | Keiichi Kimura; Japan | Yang Bozun; China |
| 100 m freestyle | S12 | Maulana Rifky Yavianda; Indonesia | Uchu Tomita; Japan | Mohammad Hossein Karimi; Iran |
| 100 m backstroke | S12 | Maulana Rifky Yavianda; Indonesia | Mohammad Hossein Karimi; Iran | Roman Potapov; Kazakhstan |
| 100 m butterfly | S12 | Deng Jieqiu; China | Maulana Rifky Yavianda; Indonesia | Mohammad Hossein Karimi; Iran |
| 50 m freestyle | S13 | Islam Aslanov; Uzbekistan | Muzaffar Tursunkhujaev; Uzbekistan | Kirill Pankov; Uzbekistan |
| 400 m freestyle | S13 | Dmitriy Horlin; Uzbekistan | Genki Saito; Japan | Firdavsbek Musabekov; Uzbekistan |
| 100 m backstroke | S13 | Kirill Pankov; Uzbekistan | Muzaffar Tursunkhujaev; Uzbekistan | Genki Saito; Japan |
| 100 m breaststroke | SB13 | Nurdaulet Zhumagali; Kazakhstan | Firdavsbek Musabekov; Uzbekistan | Nurali Sovetkanov; Kazakhstan |
| 100 m butterfly | S13 | Muzaffar Tursunkhujaev; Uzbekistan | Islam Aslanov; Uzbekistan | Kirill Pankov; Uzbekistan |
| 200 m individual medley | SM13 | Nurdaulet Zhumagali; Kazakhstan | Genki Saito; Japan | Firdavsbek Musabekov; Uzbekistan |
| 200 m freestyle | S14 | Tang Wai-lok; Hong Kong | Cheung Tsun-lok; Hong Kong | Wong Hon-yin; Hong Kong |
| 100 m backstroke | S14 | Naohide Yamaguchi; Japan | Lee In-kook; South Korea | Muhd Imaan Aiman Redzuan; Malaysia |
| 100 m breaststroke | SB14 | Naohide Yamaguchi; Japan | Kim Kyeong-bin; South Korea | Yuto Sato; Japan |
| 100 m butterfly | S14 | Anku Matsuda; Japan | shared gold | Keichi Nakajima; Japan |
| 100 m butterfly | S14 | Lee In-kook; South Korea | shared gold | Keichi Nakajima; Japan |
| 200 m individual medley | SM14 | Naohide Yamaguchi; Japan | Tang Wai-lok; Hong Kong | Keichi Nakajima; Japan |

=== Women ===
| Event | Class | Gold | Silver | Bronze |
|---|---|---|---|---|
| 200 m freestyle | S5 | Liu Yu; China | Cheng Jiao; China | Maori Yui; Japan |
| 50 m freestyle | S6 | Jiang Yuyan; China | Zhu Ji; China | Zhang Li; China |
| 400 m freestyle | S6 | Jiang Yuyan; China | Zhu Ji; China | Zhang Li; China |
| 100 m backstroke | S6 | Jiang Yuyan; China | Zhu Ji; China | Ng Cheuk Yan; Hong Kong |
| 50 m butterfly | S6 | Jiang Yuyan; China | Liu Daomin; China | He Shenggao; China |
| 200 m individual medley | SM6 | Liu Daomin; China | Zhu Ji; China | Jiang Yuyan; China |
| 100 m freestyle | S7 | Jiang Yuyan; China | Ke Liting; China | Vi Thị Hằng; Vietnam |
| 100 m breaststroke | SB6 | Liu Daomin; China | Zhang Li; China | Ke Liting; China |
| 50 m butterfly | S7 | An Nishida; Japan | Vi Thị Hằng; Vietnam | Ke Liting; China |
| 50 m freestyle | S8 | Jiang Shengnan; China | Zhu Hui; China | Jin Xiaoqin; China |
| 400 m freestyle | S8 | Zheng Tingting; China | Lu Weiyuan; China | Ke Liting; China |
| 100 m backstroke | S8 | Zheng Tingting; China | Lu Weiyuan; China | Zhu Hui; China |
| 100 m freestyle | S9 | Xu Jialing; China | Anchaya Ketkeaw; Thailand | Kanon Fukuda; Japan |
| 400 m freestyle | S9 | Xu Jialing; China | Galina Basnayake; Sri Lanka | Manami Urata; Japan |
| 100 m backstroke | S9 | Xu Jialing; China | Mikuni Utsugi; Japan | Ema Maeda; Japan |
| 100 m breaststroke | SB8 | Kanon Fukuda; Japan | Mikuni Utsugi; Japan | Zhu Hui; China |
| 100 m butterfly | S9 | Xu Jialing; China | Lu Weiyuan; China | Zhu Hui; China |
| 200 m individual medley | SM9 | Xu Jialing; China | Zhu Hui; China | Kanon Fukuda; Japan |
| 50 m freestyle | S10 | Chen Yi; China | Zhang Meng; China | Tae Kawabe; Japan |
| 100 m freestyle | S10 | Chen Yi; China | Zhang Meng; China | Monruedee Kangpila; Thailand |
| 100 m backstroke | S10 | Chen Yi; China | Zhang Meng; China | Kotone Matsunaga; Japan |
| 100 m breaststroke | SB9 | Zhang Meng; China | Chen Yi; China | Ema Maeda; Japan |
| 100 m butterfly | S10 | Chen Yi; China | Zhang Meng; China | Tae Kawabe; Japan |
| 200 m individual medley | SM10 | Zhang Meng; China | Chen Yi; China | Monruedee Kangpila; Thailand |
| 50 m freestyle | S11 | Li Guizhi; China | Zhang Xiaotong; China | Tomomi Ishiura; Japan |
| 100 m freestyle | S11 | Zhang Xiaotong; China | Cai Liwen; China | Wang Xinyi; China |
| 400 m freestyle | S11 | Zhang Xiaotong; China | Cai Liwen; China | Wang Xinyi; China |
| 100 m backstroke | S11 | Cai Liwen; China | Wang Xinyi; China | Zhang Xiaotong; China |
| 100 m breaststroke | SB11 | Ma Jia; China | Zhang Xiaotong; China | Wang Xinyi; China |
| 200 m individual medley | SM11 | Cai Liwen; China | Zhang Xiaotong; China | Ma Jia; China |
| 200 m freestyle | S14 | Aira Kinoshita; Japan | Nattharinee Khajhonmatha; Thailand | Mami Inoue; Japan |
| 100 m backstroke | S14 | Chan Yui-lam; Hong Kong | Aira Kinoshita; Japan | Nattharinee Khajhonmatha; Thailand |
| 100 m breaststroke | SB14 | Mikika Serizawa; Japan | Chan Yui-lam; Hong Kong | Syuci Indriani; Indonesia |
| 100 m butterfly | S14 | Chan Yui-lam; Hong Kong | Aira Kinoshita; Japan | Mami Inoue; Japan |
| 200 m individual medley | SM14 | Aira Kinoshita; Japan | Chan Yui-lam; Hong Kong | Cheung Ho-ying; Hong Kong |

=== Mixed ===
| Event | Class | Gold | Silver | Bronze |
|---|---|---|---|---|
| 4 × 100 m freestyle relay | S14 | Japan; Naohide Yamaguchi; Aira Kinoshita; Mami Inoue; Keichi Nakajima | Hong Kong; Tang Wai-lok; Cheung Tsun-lok; Chan Yui-lam; Cheung Ho-ying | South Korea; Lee In-kook; Kang Jung-eun; Lee Da-eun; Cho Won-sang |
| 4 × 50 m medley relay | 20 pts | China; Yuan Weiyi; Yao Cuan; Jiang Yuyan; Guo Jincheng | Japan; Eigo Tanaka; Takayuki Suzuki; An Nishida; Maori Yui | Kazakhstan; Natalia Zvyagintseva; Aisultan Kulkayev; Siyazbek Daliyev; Zulfiya Gabidullina |
| 4 × 100 m freestyle relay | 34 pts | China; Jiang Yuyan; Zhang Meng; Yang Guanglong; Guo Zhi | Japan; Kotaro Ogiwara; Kota Kubota; Kanon Fukuda; Mikuni Utsugi | Thailand; Anchaya Ketkeaw; Monruedee Kangpila; Kaweewat Sittichaiphonniti; Patchara Singhmanon |
| 4 × 100 m medley relay | 34 pts | China; Liu Fengqi; Zhang Meng; Xu Jialing; Xu Haijiao | Japan; Kota Kubota; Mikuni Utsugi; Taiyo Kawabuchi; Kanon Fukuda | Thailand; Anchaya Ketkeaw; Monruedee Kangpila; Aekkarin Noithat; Sampachan Samathi |

== Nations ==
186 Men + 93 Women = 279 Total

1. Afghanistan (1)
2. Bangladesh (1)
3. Cambodia (1)
4. China (61)
5. Hong Kong (11)
6. India (14)
7. Indonesia (9)
8. Iran (5)
9. Iraq (3)
10. Japan (43)
11. Kazakhstan (16)
12. South Korea (16)
13. Kyrgyzstan (2)
14. Laos (1)
15. Macau (3)
16. Malaysia (9)
17. Mongolia (1)
18. Nepal (3)
19. Myanmar (2)
20. Philippines (9)
21. Singapore (7)
22. Sri Lanka (2)
23. Chinese Taipei (9)
24. Thailand (31)
25. Uzbekistan (8)
26. Vietnam (7)

== See also ==
- Swimming at the 2023 ASEAN Para Games
- Swimming at the 2022 Asian Games
