= Swimming at the 2020 Summer Paralympics – Women's 100 metre backstroke S13 =

Women's 100 metre backstroke S13 at the XVI Paralympic Games
- Venue: Tokyo Aquatics Centre
- Dates: 26 August 2021
- Competitors: 11 from 8 nations

Medalists
1st place, gold medalist(s)		Gia Pergolini	United States
2nd place, silver medalist(s)		Carlotta Gilli	Italy
3rd place, bronze medalist(s)		Katja Dedekind	Australia

The Women's 100 metre backstroke S13 event at the 2020 Paralympic Games took place on 26 August 2021, at the Tokyo Aquatics Centre.

== Heats ==
The swimmers with the top eight times, regardless of heat, advanced to the final.

Rank	Heat	Lane	Name	Nationality	Time	Notes
1	2	4	Gia Pergolini	United States	1:05.05	Q, WR
2	1	3	Katja Dedekind	Australia	1:07.38	Q
3	1	4	Carlotta Gilli	Italy	1:08.00	Q
4	2	5	Nigorakhon Mirzokhidova	Uzbekistan	1:08.85	Q
5	1	5	Anna Krivshina	RPC	1:09.15	Q
6	2	6	Róisín Ní Ríain	Ireland	1:09.23	Q
7	2	2	Colleen Young	United States	1:09.39	Q
8	2	3	Shokhsanamkhon Toshpulatova	Uzbekistan	1:09.71	Q
9	1	6	Aleksandra Ziablitseva	RPC	1:10.07	
10	1	2	Anna Stetsenko	Ukraine	1:10.89	
11	2	7	Ariadna Edo Beltrán	Spain	1:20.41	

== Final ==
100m backstroke final
Rank	Lane	Name	Nationality	Time	Notes
1st place, gold medalist(s)	4	Gia Pergolini	United States	1:04.64	WR
2nd place, silver medalist(s)	3	Carlotta Gilli	Italy	1:06.10	
3rd place, bronze medalist(s)	5	Katja Dedekind	Australia	1:06.49	
4	2	Anna Krivshina	RPC	1:07.29	
5	8	Shokhsanamkhon Toshpulatova	Uzbekistan	1:08.37	
6	7	Róisín Ní Ríain	Ireland	1:08.61	
7	6	Nigorakhon Mirzokhidova	Uzbekistan	1:09.85	
8	1	Colleen Young	United States	1:09.89	
