= 2025 World Para Swimming Championships – Women's 150 metre individual medley =

The women's 150m individual medley events at the 2025 World Para Swimming Championships will be held at the Singapore Aquatic Centre between 21 and 27 September 2025. There are two events in this discipline, both for lower classification swimmers

== Schedule ==
The 150 metre individual medley events for women will be held across the following schedule:

women's 150m ind. medley
Day	Date	Classifications
Day 1	21 Sept	
Day 2	22 Sept	#SM3
Day 3	23 Sept	#SM4
Day 4	24 Spt	
Day 5	25 Sept	
Day 6	26 Sept	
Day 7	27 Sept	

== Medal summary ==
Event	Gold	Silver	Bronze
SM3	Tanja Scholz; Germany	Leanne Smith; United States	Ellie Challis; Great Britain
SM4	Mira Larionova; Individual Neutral Athletes	Hanna Polishchuk; Ukraine	Gina Böttcher; Germany

== Race summaries ==
=== SM3 ===
The women's 150 metre individual medley SM3 event will be held on the 22nd of September. Eight swimmers will take part in a direct final. Although SM2 swimmers are eligible, none have entered SM3.

The relevant records at the beginning of the event were as follows:

Record	Athlete	Time	City	Country
World	Leanne Smith (USA)	2:49.80	Indianapolis	United States
Championship	Tanja Scholz (GER)	2:53.18	Manchester	United Kingdom
Americas	Leanne Smith (USA)	02:49.8	Indianapolis	United States
Asian	Zulfiya Gabidullina (KAZ)	03:24.8	Rio de Janeiro	Brazil
European	Tanja Scholz (GER)	02:51.3	Paris	France

==== Final ====
Rank	Lane	Athlete	Class	Result	Notes
1st place, gold medalist(s)	4	Tanja Scholz (GER)	SM3	2:54.47	
2nd place, silver medalist(s)	5	Leanne Smith (USA)	SM3	3:04.48	
3rd place, bronze medalist(s)	3	Ellie Challis (GBR)	SM3	3:16.50	
4	2	Zoia Shchurova (AIN)	SM3	3:25.50	
5	6	Delia Fontcuberta Cervera (ESP)	SM3	3:29.77	
6	5	Veronika Guirenko (ISR)	SM3	4:19.55	
7	8	Aly van Wyck-Smart (CAN)	SM3	4:33.13	

=== SM4 ===
The women's 150 metre individual medley SM4 event will be held on the 23rd of September. Thirteen swimmers will take part, with the top eight progressing to the final.

The relevant records at the beginning of the event were as follows:

Record	Athlete	Time	City	Country
World	Liu Yu (CHN)	2:39.39	Tokyo	Japan
Championship	Monica Boggioni (ITA)	2:41.52	Mexico City	Mexico
African	Kat Swanepoel (RSA)	02:51.4	Manchester	United Kingdom
Americas	Lídia Vieira da Cruz (BRA)	02:57.2	Paris	France
Asian	Liu Yu (CHN)	02:39.4	Tokyo	Japan
European	Monica Boggioni (ITA)	02:41.5	Mexico City	Mexico
Oceania	Marayke Jonkers (AUS)	03:28.9	Beijing	China

==== Heats ====
Rank	Heat	Lane	Athlete	Class	Result	Notes
1	1	6	Mira Larionova (AIN)	SM4	2:51.24	Q
2	1	4	Nataliia Butkova (AIN)	SM4	2:54.89	Q
3	1	5	Lídia Vieira da Cruz (BRA)	SM4	3:01.58	Q
4	2	3	Gina Böttcher (GER)	SM4	3:04.06	Q
5	2	6	Maryna Verbova (UKR)	SM4	3:04.37	Q
6	2	4	Hanna Polishchuk (UKR)	SM4	3:04.79	Q
7	2	5	Patricia Pereira (BRA)	SM4	3:05.69	Q
8	1	3	Nely Miranda (MEX)	SM4	3:11.97	Q
9	2	2	Anastasiia Goncharova (AIN)	SM4	3:20.89	
10	1	2	Yuliia Safonova (UKR)	SM4	3:34.98	
11	1	7	Jordan Tucker (CAN)	SM4	3:44.25	
12	2	7	Zulfiya Gabidullina (KAZ)	SM4	3:45.44	

==== Final ====
Rank	Lane	Athlete	Class	Result	Notes
1st place, gold medalist(s)	4	Mira Larionova (AIN)	SM4	2:48.48	
2nd place, silver medalist(s)	7	Hanna Polishchuk (UKR)	SM4	2:54.17	
3rd place, bronze medalist(s)	6	Gina Böttcher (GER)	SM4	2:59.26	
4	3	Lídia Vieira da Cruz (BRA)	SM4	3:00.01	
5	1	Patricia Pereira (BRA)	SM4	3:01.37	
6	8	Nely Miranda (MEX)	SM4	3:09.53	
7	2	Maryna Verbova (UKR)	SM4	3:11.01	
	5	Nataliia Butkova (AIN)	SM4		DSQ
