= Adin Williams =

American paralympic swimmer (born 2000)

Personal information
- Born: October 6, 2000 (age 25)
- Home town: Happy Valley, Oregon, U.S.
- Education: George Fox University

Sport
- Sport: Para swimming
- Disability: Hypochondroplasia
- Disability class: S7
Medal record
Men's para swimming
Representing the United States
World Championships
Bronze medal – third place	2025 Singapore	Mixed 4×50 m freestyle relay 20pts
Bronze medal – third place	2025 Singapore	Mixed 4×50 m medley relay 20pts
Parapan American Games
Silver medal – second place	2023 Santiago	400 metre freestyle S7

Adin Williams (born October 6, 2000) is an American para swimmer.

== Early life ==
Williams attended Gladstone High School in Gladstone, Oregon, and graduated in 2019. He then attended George Fox University where he was a member of the swim team. In early 2023, he moved to the U.S. Olympic & Paralympic Training Center in Colorado Springs, Colorado. He has hypochondroplasia.

== Career ==
On September 25, 2023, Williams was named to team USA's roster to compete at the 2023 Parapan American Games. He made his international debut at the event and won a silver medal in the 400 meter freestyle S7 event. At the 300 meter mark he was in last place, before using a come-from-behind sprint to win the silver medal.

On June 30, 2024, he was named to team USA's roster to compete at the 2024 Summer Paralympics as an alternate. He made his World Para Swimming Championships debut in 2025 and won a bronze medal in the mixed 4×50 m freestyle relay 20pts event.
