= 2025 World Para Swimming Championships – Freestyle relays =

The mixed freestyle relays events at the 2025 World Para Swimming Championships were held at the Singapore Aquatic Centre between 21 and 27 September 2025. Four relays will take place.

== Schedule ==
Mixed freestyle relays events will be held across the following schedule:

mixed freestyle relays
Day	Date	Classifications
Day 1	21 Sept	
Day 2	22 Sept	4x50 m free relay 20pts
Day 3	23 Sept	
Day 4	24 Spt	
Day 5	25 Sept	4x100 m free relay S14
Day 6	26 Sept	4x100 m free relay 49pts
Day 7	27 Sept	4x100 m free relay 34pys

== Medal summary ==
Event	Gold	Silver	Bronze
Mixed 4 × 100 m freestyle relay (S14)	Great Britain; William Ellard; Poppy Maskill; Dylan Broom; Georgia Sheffield	Brazil; Arthur Xavier Ribeiro; Ana Karolina Soares; Beatriz Carneiro; Gabriel Bandeira	Thailand; Phakhawat Kumarasing; Natirat Meeprom; Nattharinee Khajhonmatha; Wachiraphon Thavornvasu
Mixed 4 × 100 m freestyle relay (49 pts)	Spain; José Ramón Cantero Elvira; María Delgado; Enrique José Alhambra Mollar; Marian Polo López	Brazil; Matheus Rheine; Lucilene da Silva Sousa; Douglas Matera; Carol Santiago	Japan; Keiichi Kimura; Genki Saito; Tomomi Ishiura; Ayano Tsujiuchi
Mixed 4 × 100 m freestyle relay (34 pts)	Australia; Alexa Leary; Rowan Crothers; Chloe Osborn; Callum Simpson	China; Xu Jialing; Zhang Yunxiang; Jiang Yuyan; Xie Zhili	France; Hector Denayer; Emeline Pierre; Agathe Pauli; Laurent Chardard
Mixed 4 × 50m freestyle relay (20 pts)	Ukraine; Anna Hontar; Oleksandr Komarov; Artem Oliinyk; Hanna Polishchuk	Brazil; Lídia Vieira da Cruz; Tiago Ferreira; Mayara Petzold; Samuel de Oliveira	United States; Adin Williams; Katie Kubiak; Zachary Shattuck; Leanne Smith

== Race summaries ==
All four freestyle relays consist of direct finals.

=== Mixed 4 × 100 m Freestyle relay 34pts ===
This relay will take place on 27 September, and consists of eight teams in a direct final. The aggregate classifications of teams cannot add up to more than 34. This relay contains higher classification athletes, but not those with sight impediments or learning disability.

==== Final ====
Rank	Lane	Athlete	Result	Notes
1st place, gold medalist(s)	4	Australia (AUS)	3:58.40	
2nd place, silver medalist(s)	6	China (CHN)	4:06.13	
3rd place, bronze medalist(s)	3	France (FRA)	4:08.22	
4	1	Great Britain (GBR)	4:12.78	
5	2	Spain (ESP)	4:13.54	
6	5	United States (USA)	4:13.93	
7	7	Canada (CAN)	4:21.61	

=== Mixed 4 × 100 m Freestyle relay 49pts ===
This relay took place on 26 September, and consists of four teams in a direct final. The aggregate classifications of teams cannot add up to more than 49. This relay consists exclusively of swimmers with sight impediments.

==== Final ====
Rank	Lane	Athlete	Result	Notes
1st place, gold medalist(s)	5	Spain (ESP)	3:55.54	
2nd place, silver medalist(s)	4	Brazil (BRA)	3:56.28	
3rd place, bronze medalist(s)	3	Japan (JPN)	3:07.96	
4	6	China (CHN)	4:34.44	

=== Mixed 4 × 100 m Freestyle relay S14 ===
This relay took place on 24 September, and consists of four teams in a direct final. All swimmers are S14 classified, and so this relay consists of swimmers with a learning or intellectual disability.

==== Final ====
Rank	Lane	Athlete	Result	Notes
1st place, gold medalist(s)	4	Great Britain (GBR)	3:41.14	CR
2nd place, silver medalist(s)	5	Brazil (BRA)	3:45.36	AM
3rd place, bronze medalist(s)	3	Thailand (THA)	3:58.46	
4	6	Singapore (SGP)	4:47.94	

=== Mixed 4 × 50 m freestyle relay 20pts ===
This relay will take place on 23 September, and consists of five teams in a direct final. The aggregate classifications of teams cannot add up to more than 20. This relay consists of athlete in lower classifications, usually S6 or below.

==== Final ====
Rank	Lane	Athlete	Result	Notes
1st place, gold medalist(s)	3	Ukraine (UKR)	2:18.36	CR
2nd place, silver medalist(s)	5	Brazil (BRA)	2:21.09	
3rd place, bronze medalist(s)	4	United States (USA)	2:21.62	
4	6	Spain (ESP)	2:30.08	
5	2	Canada (CAN)	3:07.62	
