= Georgia Sheffield =

British para swimmer (born 2005)

Personal information
- Nationality: British
- Born: 5 March 2005 (age 21)

Sport
- Sport: Para swimming
- Disability class: S14
- Club: Bolton Metro
- Coached by: Ric Howard
Medal record
Women's para swimming
Representing Great Britain
World Championships
Gold medal – first place	2025 Singapore	Mixed 4×100 m freestyle relay S14
Bronze medal – third place	2023 Manchester	100 m backstroke S14
Bronze medal – third place	2025 Singapore	100 m backstroke S14
Representing England
Commonwealth Games
Gold medal – first place	2026 Glasgow	200 m freestyle S14

Georgia Sheffield (born 5 March 2005) is a British para swimmer.

== Career ==
Sheffield made her World Para Swimming Championships debut at the 2023 World Para Swimming Championships. She won a bronze medal in the 100 metre backstroke S14 event, in a Great Britain podium sweep. She again competed at the World Championships in 2025 World Para Swimming Championships and won a bronze medal in the 100 metre backstroke S14 event, again in a Great Britain podium sweep. She also won a gold medal in the mixed 4 × 100 metre freestyle relay S14 event with a championship record time of 3:41.14.
