= Zhang Yunxiang =

Chinese Paralympic swimmer

Personal information
- Nationality: Chinese

Sport
- Sport: Para swimming
- Disability class: S10, SM10
Medal record
Men's para swimming
Representing China
World Championships
Silver medal – second place	2025 Singapore	Mixed 4×100 m freestyle relay 34 pts

Zhang Yunxiang is a Chinese para swimmer.

== Career ==
He competed at the 2025 World Para Swimming Championships and won a silver medal in the Mixed 4 × 100 m freestyle relay 20 pts event. He also competed in the 400 metre freestyle S10 event and finished in fourth place with an Asian record time of 4:15.82.
