= Swimming at the 2020 Summer Paralympics – Women's 100 metre backstroke S6 =

Women's 100 metre backstroke S6 at the XVI Paralympic Games
- Venue: Tokyo Aquatics Centre
- Dates: 3 September 2021
- Competitors: 14 from 10 nations

Medalists
1st place, gold medalist(s)		Elizabeth Marks	United States
2nd place, silver medalist(s)		Jiang Yuyan	China
3rd place, bronze medalist(s)		Verena Schott	Germany

The Women's 100 metre backstroke S6 event at the 2020 Paralympic Games took place on 3 September 2021, at the Tokyo Aquatics Centre.

== Heats ==
The swimmers with the top eight times, regardless of heat, advanced to the final.

Rank	Heat	Lane	Name	Nationality	Time	Notes
1	1	4	Elizabeth Marks	United States	1:21.76	Q, PR
2	1	6	Yelyzaveta Mereshko	Ukraine	1:22.11	Q
3	2	4	Shelby Newkirk	Canada	1:22.83	Q
4	2	6	Verena Schott	Germany	1:23.92	Q
5	1	3	Song Lingling	China	1:24.15	Q
6	1	5	Jiang Yuyan	China	1:24.41	Q
7	2	5	Nora Meister	Switzerland	1:24.44	Q
8	2	3	Anna Hontar	Ukraine	1:25.23	Q
9	2	2	Anastasia Diodorova	RPC	1:25.96	
10	1	7	Sara Vargas Blanco	Colombia	1:30.23	
11	2	7	Anastasiia Zavalii	Ukraine	1:30.62	
12	1	2	Grace Harvey	Great Britain	1:31.10	
13	2	1	Fanni Illés	Hungary	1:36.58	
14	1	1	Evelin Száraz	Hungary	1:41.30	

== Final ==
100m backstroke final
Rank	Lane	Name	Nationality	Time	Notes
1st place, gold medalist(s)	4	Elizabeth Marks	United States	1:19.57	WR
2nd place, silver medalist(s)	7	Jiang Yuyan	China	1:20.65	
3rd place, bronze medalist(s)	6	Verena Schott	Germany	1:21.16	
4	3	Shelby Newkirk	Canada	1:21.79	
5	2	Song Lingling	China	1:22.21	
6	5	Yelyzaveta Mereshko	Ukraine	1:22.58	
7	8	Anna Hontar	Ukraine	1:24.14	
8	1	Nora Meister	Switzerland	1:24.52	
