= Roan Brennan =

British para swimmer

Personal information
- Nationality: British

Sport
- Sport: Para swimming
- Disability: Cerebral palsy
- Disability class: S10
Medal record
Men's para swimming
Representing Great Britain
World Championships
Silver medal – second place	2025 Singapore	Mixed 4×100 m medley relay 34pts

Roan Brennan is a British para swimmer.

== Career ==
On 6 August 2025, Brennan was selected to compete at the 2025 World Para Swimming Championships. He made his World Para Swimming Championships debut and won a silver medal in the mixed 4×100 metre medley relay 34pts event.

== Personal life ==
Brennan was born premature and has cerebral palsy that affects the left side of his body.
