= Zhang Xiaotong =

Chinese swimmer

Xiaotong Zhang
Personal information
- Nationality: China

Sport
- Sport: Swimming
- Strokes: breaststroke
Medal record
Women's swimming
Representing China
Paralympic Games
Gold medal – first place	2016 Rio de Janeiro	100 m breaststroke SB11
Silver medal – second place	2024 Paris	400 m freestyle S11
Bronze medal – third place	2024 Paris	100 m freestyle S11
World Championships
Silver medal – second place	2025 Singapore	200 m ind. medley SM11
Bronze medal – third place	2025 Singapore	100 m freestyle S11
Bronze medal – third place	2025 Singapore	400 m freestyle S11
Asian Para Games
Gold medal – first place	2022 Hangzhou	400 m freestyle S11
Silver medal – second place	2022 Hangzhou	50 m freestyle S11

Xiaotong Zhang is a Chinese swimmer. She won a gold medal at the 2016 Paralympic Games. She competes in the Paralympic class S11. She is a paralympic World Record and Asian Record holder.
