= Mira Larionova =

Russian para swimmer

Personal information
- Nationality: Russian

Sport
- Sport: Para swimming
- Disability class: S4, SM4, SB3
Medal record
Women's para swimming
Representing Neutral Paralympic Athletes
World Championships
| Gold medal – first place | 2025 Singapore | 150 m ind. medley SM4 |
| Silver medal – second place | 2025 Singapore | 100 m breaststroke SB3 |
| Silver medal – second place | 2025 Singapore | 100 m freestyle S4 |
| Bronze medal – third place | 2025 Singapore | 200 m freestyle S4 |
Representing Russia
European Championships
| Gold medal – first place | 2026 Kocaeli | 50 m backstroke S4 |
| Gold medal – first place | 2026 Kocaeli | 4×50 m freestyle relay 20 pts |
| Gold medal – first place | 2026 Kocaeli | 4×50 m medley relay 20 pts |
| Silver medal – second place | 2026 Kocaeli | 50 m breaststroke SB3 |
| Silver medal – second place | 2026 Kocaeli | 50 m freestyle S4 |
| Silver medal – second place | 2026 Kocaeli | 100 m freestyle S4 |
| Silver medal – second place | 2026 Kocaeli | 150 m ind. medley SM4 |

Mira Larionova is a Russian para swimmer.

== Career ==
In September 2025, she competed at the 2025 World Para Swimming Championships and won a gold medal in the 150 metre individual medley SM4 event. She also won silver medals in the 100 metre freestyle Sand 50 metre breaststroke SB3 events.
