= Swimming at the 2026 Commonwealth Games – Women's 200 metre freestyle S14 =

Women's 200 metre freestyle S14 at the 2026 Commonwealth Games
- Venue: Tollcross International Swimming Centre
- Dates: 25 July
- Competitors: 7 from 5 nations
- Winning time: 2:06.07

Medalists
gold medal	Georgia Sheffield	England
silver medal	Poppy Maskill	England
bronze medal	Bethany Firth	Northern Ireland

The women's 200 metre freestyle S14 event at the 2026 Commonwealth Games was held on 25 July at the Tollcross International Swimming Centre.

== Schedule ==
The schedule is as follows:

All times are British Summer Time (UTC+1)

Date	Time	Round
Saturday 25 July 2026	10:30	Heat
Saturday 25 July 2026	19:00	Final

== Results ==
=== Heat ===
The heat will be held on the morning of 25 July 2026.

Heat results
Rank	Lane	Swimmer	Nation	Time	Notes
1	6	Bethany Firth	Northern Ireland	2:09.96	Q
2	5	Poppy Maskill	England	2:10.71	Q
3	3	Georgia Sheffield	England	2:10.90	Q
4	2	Madeleine McTernan	Australia	2:11.20	Q
5	4	Louise Fiddes	England	2:12.46	Q
6	7	Rose Williams	Wales	2:14.75	Q
7	1	Emma van Dyk	Canada	2:30.37	Q

=== Final ===
The final took place during of the evening of 25 July 2026.

Final results
Rank	Lane	Swimmer	Nation	Time	Notes
1st place, gold medalist(s)	3	Georgia Sheffield	England	2:06.07	
2nd place, silver medalist(s)	5	Poppy Maskill	England	2:07.44	
3rd place, bronze medalist(s)	4	Bethany Firth	Northern Ireland	2:07.63	
4	7	Rose Williams	Wales	2:11.29	
5	2	Louise Fiddes	England	2:11.38	
5	6	Madeleine McTernan	Australia	2:11.38	
7	1	Emma van Dyk	Canada	2:31.24	
