= Hanna Polishchuk =

Ukrainian para swimmer (born 2004)

Personal information
- Nationality: Ukrainian

Sport
- Sport: Para swimming
- Disability class: S4, SB3
Medal record
Women's para swimming
Representing Ukraine
World Championships
| Gold medal – first place | 2025 Singapore | Mixed 4×50 m freestyle relay 20 pts |
| Silver medal – second place | 2025 Singapore | 150 m ind. medley SM4 |

Hanna Polishchuk is a Ukrainian para swimmer.

== Career ==
Polishchuk competed at the 2025 World Para Swimming Championships and won a gold medal in the mixed 4×50 metre freestyle relay 20 pts.
