= Emma Mečić =

Croatian Paralympic swimmer (born 2007)

Personal information
- Born: 11 June 2007 (age 19) Locarno, Switzerland
- Home town: Odžak, Bosnia and Herzegovina

Sport
- Sport: Paralympic swimming
- Disability: Femoral hypoplasia
- Disability class: S9
Medal record
Representing Croatia
World Championships
Silver medal – second place	2023 Manchester	400m freestyle S9
Silver medal – second place	2025 Singapore	400m freestyle S9
European Championships
Gold medal – first place	2024 Funchal	400m freestyle S9
Bronze medal – third place	2024 Funchal	100m backstroke S9

Emma Mečić (born 11 June 2007) is a Croatian Paralympic swimmer of Swiss and Bosnian descent who competes in international swimming competitions. She is a European champion and World silver medalist in freestyle swimming, she competed at the 2024 Summer Paralympics. Mečić won 3 gold medals at the 2025 European Para Youth Games in Istanbul.

Mečić was born with a shortened right leg. She took up swimming at the age of five years old.
