= Tomomi Ishiura =

Japanese Paralympic swimmer (born 1988)

Personal information
- Nationality: Japanese
- Born: 13 January 1988 (age 38)

Sport
- Sport: Paralympic swimming
- Disability class: S11
Medal record
Women's Paralympic swimming
Representing Japan
World Championships
Bronze medal – third place	2025 Singapore	Mixed 4×100 m medley relay 49pts
Bronze medal – third place	2025 Singapore	Mixed 4×100 m freestyle relay 49pts
Asian Para Games
Bronze medal – third place	2022 Hangzhou	50 m freestyle S11

Tomomi Ishiura (born 13 January 1988) is a Japanese Paralympic swimmer. She represented Japan at the 2020 and 2024 Summer Paralympics.

== Career ==
Ishiura represented Japan at the 2020 and 2024 Summer Paralympics. She competed at the 2022 Asian Para Games and won a bronze medal in the 50 metre freestyle S11 event.

She competed at the 2025 World Para Swimming Championships and won bronze medals in the mixed 4 × 100 metre medley relay 49 pts and mixed 4 × 100 metre freestyle relay 49pts events.
