= Zhu Ji =

Chinese para swimmer (born 2004)

Personal information
- Born: 10 September 2004 (age 21) Hangzhou, China

Sport
- Sport: Para swimming
- Disability class: S6, SM6
Medal record
Women's para swimming
Representing China
World Championships
Gold medal – first place	2025 Singapore	200 m ind. medley SM6
Silver medal – second place	2025 Singapore	Mixed 4×50 m medley relay 20pts
Bronze medal – third place	2025 Singapore	400 m freestyle S6
Asian Para Games
Silver medal – second place	2022 Hangzhou	50 m freestyle S6
Silver medal – second place	2022 Hangzhou	400 m freestyle S6
Silver medal – second place	2022 Hangzhou	100 m backstroke S6
Silver medal – second place	2022 Hangzhou	200 m ind. medley SM6

Zhu Ji (born 10 September 2004) is a Chinese para swimmer. She represented China at the 2024 Summer Paralympics.

== Career ==
Zhu competed at the 2022 Asian Para Games and won silver medals in the 50 metre freestyle, 400 metre freestyle, 100 metre backstroke and 200 metre individual medley S6 events.

Zhu represented China at the 2024 Summer Paralympics. Her best finish was fifth place in the 200 metre individual medley SM6 event, with a time of 3:08.31. In September 2025, she competed at the 2025 World Para Swimming Championships and won a gold medal in the 200 metre individual medley SM6 event.
