= Ying Liu (engineer) =

Chinese electrical engineer

Ying Liu (Chinese: 刘英, born 1977) is a Chinese electrical engineer whose research concerns the design of antennas and antenna arrays with low radar cross section. She is a professor at Xidian University and director of its National Key Laboratory of Radar Detection and Perception.

== Education and career ==
Liu is originally from Zhoukou, where she was born in 1977. She was a student at Xidian University, where she received her bachelor's, master's, and doctoral degrees in 1998, 2001, and 2004 respectively.

She joined the faculty of Xidian University in 2004. After postdoctoral research in Korea at Hanyang University, she was promoted to associate professor in 2007, and to full professor in 2010.

== Books ==
Liu is a coauthor of the English-language book Antenna Radar Cross Section: Theory and Design (with Yongtao Jia and Shuxi Gong, Springer, 2025). She is also the author of two Chinese-language books, Prediction and Reduction of Antenna Radar Cross Section (Xidian University Press, 2010), and Antennas for Mobile Communication Systems (Electronics Industry Press, 2011).

== Recognition ==
Liu was elected as an IEEE Fellow, in the 2025 class of fellows, "for contributions to the development of antennas with low radar cross-section". She is also a Fellow of the Chinese Electronics Society, a Fellow of the China Institute of Communications, and a Fellow of the Institution of Engineering and Technology.
