= Elizabeth Marks =

American Paralympic swimmer (born 1990)

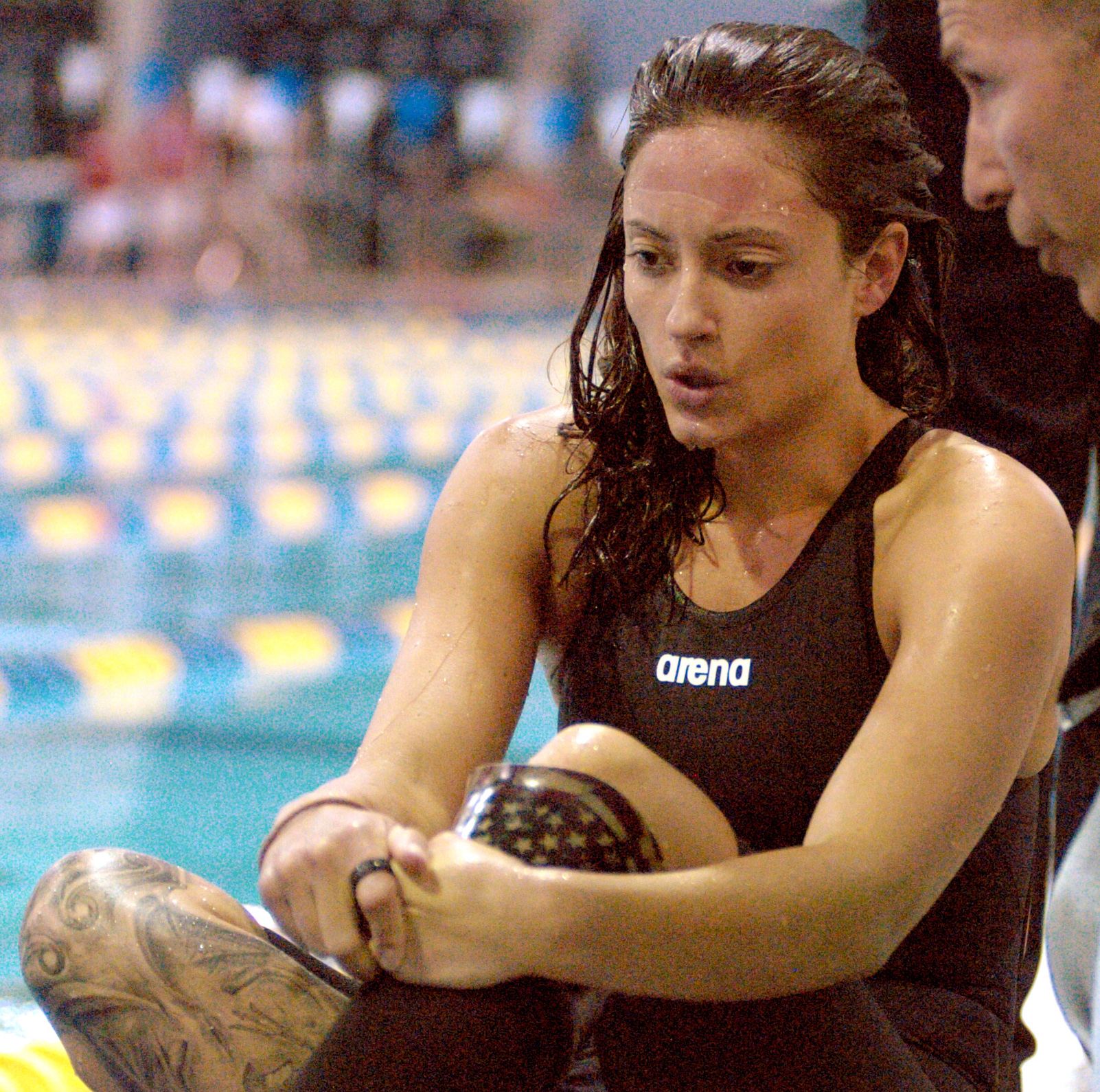
- Marks in 2016

Personal information
- Nickname: Ellie
- Born: August 7, 1990 (age 35) Prescott Valley, Arizona, U.S.
- Height: 5 ft 5 in (165 cm)
- Weight: 115 lb (52 kg)

Sport
- Sport: Swimming
- Strokes: Breaststroke
- Club: U.S. Army WCAP
Medal record
Women's swimming
Representing the United States
Paralympic Games
Gold medal – first place	2016 Rio	100 m breaststroke SB7
Gold medal – first place	2020 Tokyo	100 m backstroke S6
Silver medal – second place	2020 Tokyo	50 m freestyle S6
Silver medal – second place	2024 Paris	50 m freestyle S6
Silver medal – second place	2024 Paris	100 m backstroke S6
Silver medal – second place	2024 Paris	200 m ind. medley SM6
Silver medal – second place	2024 Paris	mixed 4×50 m freestyle relay 20 pts
Silver medal – second place	2024 Paris	mixed 4×50 m medley relay 20pts
Bronze medal – third place	2016 Rio	4×100 m medley 34pts
Bronze medal – third place	2020 Tokyo	50 m butterfly S6

Sergeant First Class Elizabeth Marks (born August 7, 1990) is an American Paralympic swimmer who specializes in the 100m breaststroke distance.

== Early life ==
Marks was born to James Marks, a U.S. Marine veteran who served during the Vietnam War. She graduated high school at age 16 before attending community colleges in Arizona.

Marks joined the U.S. Army in July 2008 aged 17 and earned the military occupational specialty 68W, Health Care Specialist. While deployed in Iraq in 2010 she suffered bilateral hip injuries that left her disabled; she has a tattoo over most of her right leg.

Marks, then known by her married name Elizabeth Wasil, recovered from her injuries, first in Germany, then at Brooke Army Medical Center (BAMC) at Fort Sam Houston in San Antonio, Texas.

While it initially appeared that Marks could be declared unfit for duty by Army medics, she set a goal to become fit for duty. She began swimming as way to complete additional physical therapy and cardio while at BAMC and obtained the fit for duty classification on July 3, 2012.

== Career ==
Marks began competing in swimming competitions shortly after joining the U.S. Army World Class Athlete Program in July 2012.

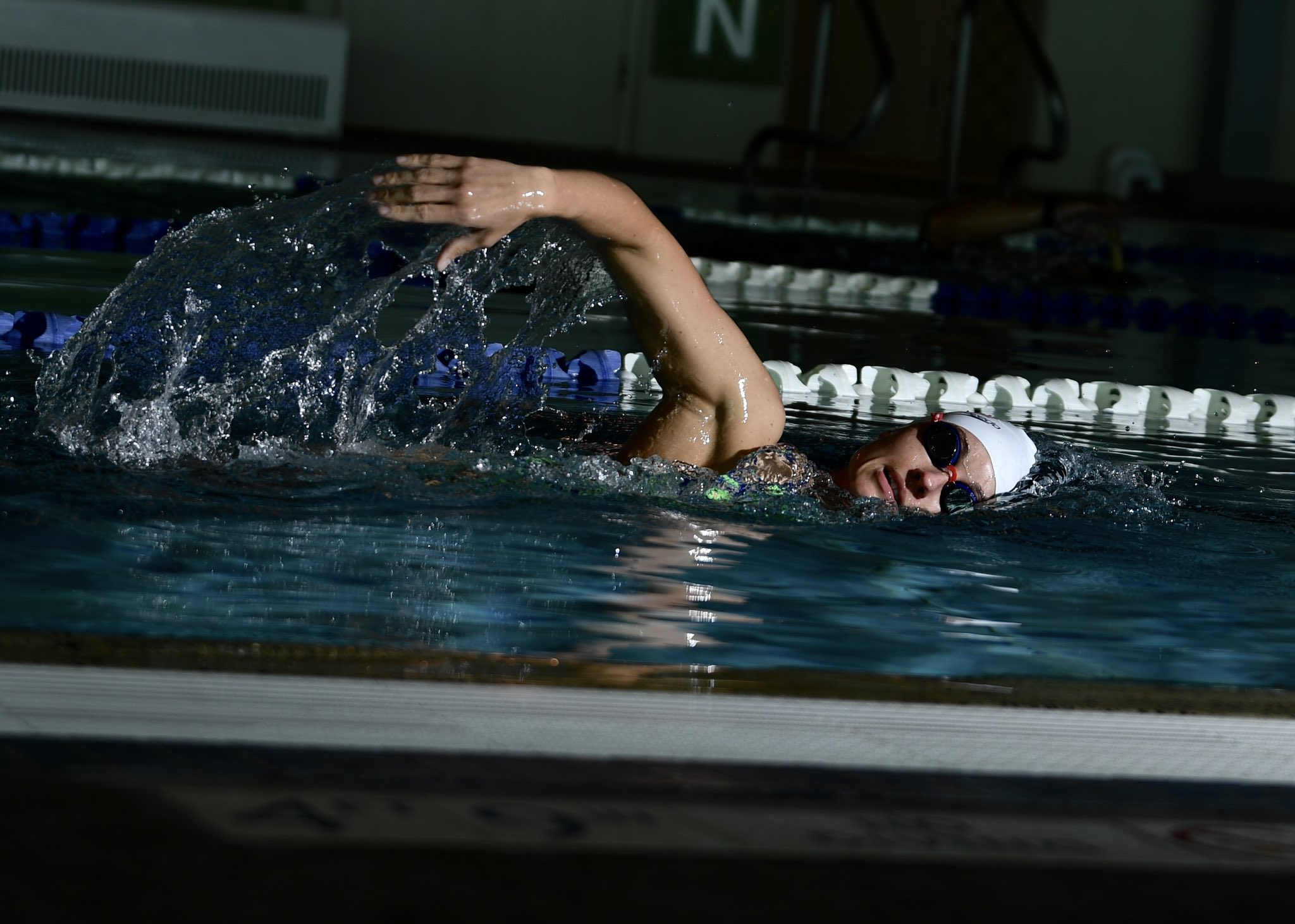
Marks competes at the 2020 Summer Paralympics in Tokyo, Japan.

In 2014, during the 2014 Invictus Games, she contracted a severe respiratory infection, which forced doctors at Papworth Hospital, United Kingdom to place her in a medically induced coma for one month. The infection left Marks with a reduced lung capacity and prolonged exercise can affect her vision.

Marks has won a gold medal at the 2015 Military World Games and four gold medals at the 2016 Invictus Games. After the ceremony, she privately asked Prince Harry, who had awarded her her gold medals, if he could present one of her Invictus gold medals to the Doctors and Nurses of Papworth Hospital who had saved her life. She qualified for the 2016 Summer Paralympics by clocking a time of 1:28.54 at the U.S. trials, which was only 0.01 seconds short of the world record. She won an individual gold and a relay bronze medal at the Paralympics.

In June 2021 the US announced the 34 Paralympic swimmers who would be going to the delayed 2020 Summer Paralympics in Tokyo. The women's team was Marks, Jessica Long, McKenzie Coan, Rebecca Meyers and Mallory Weggemann.

On April 14, 2022, Marks was named to the roster to represent the United States at the 2022 World Para Swimming Championships. On April 29, 2023, Marks was named to the roster to represent the United States at the 2023 World Para Swimming Championships.

== Personal life ==
Marks is married to former US Army Explosive Ordnance Disposal soldier, Mason Heibel.

== Recognition ==
In 2016, Marks received the Pat Tillman Award for Service at the 2016 ESPY Awards, and, as of 2022 was the only active-duty soldier to receive the award.

In 2017, Marks was inducted into the U.S. Army Women's Foundation Hall of Fame.
