= Nattharinee Khajhonmatha =

Thai para swimmer (born 2006)

Personal information
- Nationality: Thai
- Born: 30 July 2006 (age 19) Bangkok, Thailand

Sport
- Sport: Para swimming
- Disability class: S14, SM14
Medal record
Women's para swimming
Representing Thailand
World Championships
Bronze medal – third place	2025 Singapore	Mixed 4×100 m freestyle relay S14
Bronze medal – third place	2025 Singapore	Mixed 4×100 m medley relay S14
Asian Para Games
Silver medal – second place	2022 Hangzhou	200 m freestyle S14
Bronze medal – third place	2022 Hangzhou	100 m backstroke S14
ASEAN Para Games
Gold medal – first place	2023 Cambodia	50 m freestyle S14
Gold medal – first place	2023 Cambodia	100 m freestyle S14
Gold medal – first place	2023 Cambodia	200 m freestyle S14
Gold medal – first place	2023 Cambodia	100 m backstroke S14
Gold medal – first place	2023 Cambodia	200 m ind. medley SM14

Nattharinee Khajhonmatha (born 30 July 2006) is a Thai para swimmer. She represented Thailand at the 2024 Summer Paralympics.

== Career ==
Khajhonmatha competed at the 2022 Asian Para Games and won a silver medal in the 200 metre freestyle and a bronze medal in the 100 metre backstroke S14 events. In June 2023, she competed at the 2023 ASEAN Para Games and won gold medals in the 50 metre freestyle, 100 metre freestyle, 200 metre freestyle, 100 metre backstroke, and 200 metre individual medley S14 events.

She represented Thailand at the 2024 Summer Paralympics. She competed at the 2025 World Para Swimming Championships and won bronze medals in the mixed 4 × 100 metre freestyle relay S14 and mixed 4 × 100 metre medley relay S14 events.
