= Swimming at the 2020 Summer Paralympics – Men's 50 metre butterfly =

The Men's 50 metre butterfly swimming events for the 2020 Summer Paralympics took place at the Tokyo Aquatics Centre from August 27 to September 3, 2021. A total of three events were contested over this distance.

== Schedule ==
H	Heats	½	Semifinals	F	Final

Date	Fri 27		Sat 28		Sun 29		Mon 30		Tue 31		Wed 1		Thu 2		Fri 3	
Event	M	E	M	E	M	E	M	E	M	E	M	E	M	E	M	E
S5 50m	H	F														
S6 50m							H	F								
S7 50m															H	F

== Medal summary ==
The following is a summary of the medals awarded across all 50 metre butterfly events.

Classification	Gold		Silver		Bronze	
S5	Zheng Tao; China	30.62 WR	Wang Lichao; China	31.81	Yuan Weiyi; China	32.00
S6	Wang Jingang; China	30.81	Jia Hongguang; China	31.54	Nelson Crispín; Colombia	31.77
S7	Evan Austin; United States	28.98	Andrii Trusov; Ukraine	29.03	Carlos Serrano Zárate; Colombia	29.34

== Results ==
The following were the results of the finals only of each of the Men's 50 metre butterfly events in each of the classifications. Further details of each event, including where appropriate heats and semi finals results, are available on that event's dedicated page.

=== S5 ===
The S5 category is for swimmers who have hemiplegia, paraplegia or short stature.

The final in this classification took place on 27 August 2021:

Rank	Lane	Name	Nationality	Time	Notes
1st place, gold medalist(s)	5	Zheng Tao	China	30.62	WR
2nd place, silver medalist(s)	7	Wang Lichao	China	31.81	
3rd place, bronze medalist(s)	4	Yuan Weiyi	China	32.00	
4	3	Yaroslav Semenenko	Ukraine	35.13	
5	6	Siyazbek Daliyev	Kazakhstan	35.27	
6	1	Daniel Dias	Brazil	36.56	
7	8	Kaede Hinata	Japan	37.24	
8	2	Abbas Karimi	Refugee Paralympic Team	38.16	

=== S6 ===
The S6 category is for swimmers who have short stature, arm amputations, or some form of coordination problem on one side of their body.

The final in this classification took place on 30 August 2021:

Rank	Lane	Name	Nationality	Time	Notes
1st place, gold medalist(s)	4	Wang Jingang	China	30.81	
2nd place, silver medalist(s)	3	Jia Hongguang	China	31.54	
3rd place, bronze medalist(s)	5	Nelson Crispín	Colombia	31.77	
4	2	Laurent Chardard	France	32.29	
5	6	David Sanchez Sierra	Spain	32.49	
6	1	Yerzhan Salimgereyev	Kazakhstan	32.53	
7	7	Gabriel Melone De Oliveira	Brazil	33.01	
8	8	Alejandro Yared Rojas Cabrera	Spain	33.60	

=== S7 ===
The S7 category is for swimmers who have one leg and one arm amputation on opposite side or paralysis on one side of their body. These swimmers have full control of their arms and trunk but variable function in their legs.

The final in this classification took place on 3 September 2021:

Rank	Lane	Name	Nationality	Time	Notes
1st place, gold medalist(s)	4	Evan Austin	United States	28.98	AM
2nd place, silver medalist(s)	3	Andrii Trusov	Ukraine	29.03	ER
3rd place, bronze medalist(s)	6	Carlos Serrano Zárate	Colombia	29.34	
4	5	Wei Soong Toh	Singapore	29.50	
5	2	Yevhenii Bohodaiko	Ukraine	29.70	
6	8	Egor Efrosinin	RPC	30.46	
7	1	Inaki Basiloff	Argentina	30.47	
-	7	Christian Sadie	South Africa	DSQ	
