= Swimming at the 2020 Summer Paralympics – Men's 50 metre butterfly S7 =

Men's 50 metre butterfly S7 at the XVI Paralympic Games
- Venue: Tokyo Aquatics Centre
- Dates: 3 September 2021
- Competitors: 12 from 9 nations

Medalists
| 1st place, gold medalist(s) | | Evan Austin | United States |
| 2nd place, silver medalist(s) | | Andrii Trusov | Ukraine |
| 3rd place, bronze medalist(s) | | Carlos Serrano Zárate | Colombia |

The men's 50 metre butterfly S7 event at the 2020 Paralympic Games took place on 3 September 2021, at the Tokyo Aquatics Centre.

== Heats ==
The swimmers with the top eight times, regardless of heat, advanced to the final.

| Rank | Heat | Lane | Name | Nationality | Time | Notes |
|---|---|---|---|---|---|---|
| 1 | 1 | 4 | Evan Austin | United States | 29.71 | Q |
| 2 | 1 | 6 | Wei Soong Toh | Singapore | 29.90 | Q |
| 3 | 2 | 4 | Andrii Trusov | Ukraine | 29.91 | Q |
| 4 | 1 | 5 | Carlos Serrano Zárate | Colombia | 30.04 | Q |
| 5 | 2 | 5 | Yevhenii Bohodaiko | Ukraine | 30.34 | Q |
| 6 | 1 | 3 | Christian Sadie | South Africa | 30.57 | Q, AF |
| 7 | 2 | 3 | Inaki Basiloff | Argentina | 30.96 | Q |
| 8 | 2 | 6 | Egor Efrosinin | RPC | 31.55 | Q |
| 9 | 2 | 2 | Rudy Garcia-Tolson | United States | 32.34 | |
| 10 | 1 | 2 | Suyash Jadhav | India | 32.36 | |
| 11 | 2 | 7 | Niranjan Mukundan | India | 33.82 | |
| 12 | 1 | 7 | Mark Malyar | Israel | 33.90 | |

== Final ==
50m butterfly final
| Rank | Lane | Name | Nationality | Time | Notes |
|---|---|---|---|---|---|
| 1st place, gold medalist(s) | 4 | Evan Austin | United States | 28.98 | AM |
| 2nd place, silver medalist(s) | 3 | Andrii Trusov | Ukraine | 29.03 | ER |
| 3rd place, bronze medalist(s) | 6 | Carlos Serrano Zárate | Colombia | 29.34 | |
| 4 | 5 | Wei Soong Toh | Singapore | 29.50 | |
| 5 | 2 | Yevhenii Bohodaiko | Ukraine | 29.70 | |
| 6 | 8 | Egor Efrosinin | RPC | 30.46 | |
| 7 | 1 | Inaki Basiloff | Argentina | 30.47 | |
| - | 7 | Christian Sadie | South Africa | DSQ | |
