= Swimming at the 2024 Summer Paralympics – Men's 50 metre butterfly S7 =

Men's 50 metre butterfly S7 at the XVII Paralympic Games
- Venue: La Défense Arena
- Date: 7 September 2024
- Competitors: 12 from 10 nations
- Winning time: 28.75

Medalists
1st place, gold medalist(s)		Andrii Trusov	Ukraine
2nd place, silver medalist(s)		Carlos Serrano Zárate	Colombia
3rd place, bronze medalist(s)		Egor Efrosinin	Neutral Paralympic Athletes

The men's 50 metre butterfly swimming (S7) event at the 2024 Summer Paralympics took place on 7 September 2024, at the La Défense Arena in Paris.

== Records ==
Prior to the competition, the existing world and Paralympic records were as follows.

World Record	Pan Shiyun (CHN)	28.41	Rio de Janeiro, Brazil	12 September 2016
Paralympic Record	Pan Shiyun (CHN)	28.41	Rio de Janeiro, Brazil	12 September 2016

== Results ==
=== Heats ===
The heats were started at 10:25.

Rank	Heat	Lane	Name	Nationality	Time	Notes
1	2	5	Carlos Serrano Zárate	Colombia	29.43	Q
2	1	4	Evan Austin	United States	29.90	Q
3	1	5	Christian Sadie	South Africa	30.23	Q
4	2	3	Ievgenii Bogodaiko	Ukraine	30.33	Q
4	2	4	Andrii Trusov	Ukraine	30.33	Q
6	1	6	Egor Efrosinin	Neutral Paralympic Athletes	30.67	Q
7	2	6	Iñaki Basiloff	Argentina	30.88	Q
8	1	3	Toh Wei Soong	Singapore	31.66	Q
9	2	2	Huang Xianquan	China	32.49	
10	1	2	Suyash Jadhav	India	33.47	
11	1	7	Yurii Shenhur	Ukraine	33.98	
	2	7	Jurijs Semjonovs	Latvia	Disqualified	

=== Final ===
The final was held at 18:30.

Rank	Lane	Name	Nationality	Time	Notes
1st place, gold medalist(s)	2	Andrii Trusov	Ukraine	28.78	ER
2nd place, silver medalist(s)	4	Carlos Serrano Zárate	Colombia	29.08	
3rd place, bronze medalist(s)	7	Egor Efrosinin	Neutral Paralympic Athletes	29.69	
4	5	Evan Austin	United States	29.89	
5	3	Christian Sadie	South Africa	29.94	=AF
6	6	Ievgenii Bogodaiko	Ukraine	30.14	
7	1	Iñaki Basiloff	Argentina	30.80	
8	8	Toh Wei Soong	Singapore	30.96	
