= Swimming at the 2020 Summer Paralympics – Men's 50 metre freestyle S7 =

Men's 50 metre freestyle S7 at the XVI Paralympic Games
- Venue: Tokyo Aquatics Centre
- Dates: 31 August 2021
- Competitors: 13 from 11 nations

Medalists
1st place, gold medalist(s)		Andrii Trusov	Ukraine
2nd place, silver medalist(s)		Carlos Serrano Zárate	Colombia
3rd place, bronze medalist(s)		Yevhenii Bohodaiko	Ukraine

The men's 50 metre freestyle S7 event at the 2020 Paralympic Games took place on 31 August 2021, at the Tokyo Aquatics Centre.

== Heats ==
The swimmers with the top eight times, regardless of heat, advanced to the final.

Rank	Heat	Lane	Name	Nationality	Time	Notes
1	2	4	Andrii Trusov	Ukraine	27.44	Q
2	1	3	Egor Efrosinin	RPC	28.24	Q
3	1	4	Yevhenii Bohodaiko	Ukraine	28.27	Q
4	1	5	Matthew Levy	Australia	28.50	Q
5	2	7	Mark Malyar	Israel	28.57	Q
6	2	5	Carlos Serrano Zárate	Colombia	28.60	Q
7	2	3	Federico Bicelli	Italy	28.78	Q
8	2	6	Wei Soong Toh	Singapore	29.01	Q
9	1	6	Christian Sadie	South Africa	29.22	
10	2	2	Antonio Fantin	Italy	29.70	
11	1	2	Inaki Basiloff	Argentina	30.27	
12	1	7	Wang Jingang	China	30.41	
13	2	1	Lorenzo Perez Escalona	Cuba	32.47	

== Final ==
50m freestyle final
Rank	Lane	Name	Nationality	Time	Notes
1st place, gold medalist(s)	4	Andrii Trusov	Ukraine	27.43	
2nd place, silver medalist(s)	7	Carlos Serrano Zárate	Colombia	27.84	=AM
3rd place, bronze medalist(s)	3	Yevhenii Bohodaiko	Ukraine	27.99	
4	5	Egor Efrosinin	RPC	28.31	
5	6	Matthew Levy	Australia	28.39	
6	2	Mark Malyar	Israel	28.49	
7	8	Wei Soong Toh	Singapore	28.65	
8	1	Federico Bicelli	Italy	28.77	
