= Swimming at the 2024 Summer Paralympics – Men's 400 metre freestyle S7 =

2024 Olympic games

Men's 400 metre freestyle S7 at the XVII Paralympic Games
- Venue: Paris La Défense Arena
- Date: 2 September 2024
- Competitors: 9 from 7 nations

Medalists
1st place, gold medalist(s)		Federico Bicelli	Italy
2nd place, silver medalist(s)		Andrii Trusov	Ukraine
3rd place, bronze medalist(s)		Iñaki Basiloff	Argentina

The Men's 400 metre freestyle S7 event at the 2024 Paralympic Games was held on 2 September 2024 at the Paris La Défense Arena.

== Records ==
World record	Mark Malyar (ISR)	4:31.06	Tokyo, Japan	29 August 2021
Paralympic record	Mark Malyar (ISR)	4:31.06	Tokyo, Japan	29 August 2021

== Heats ==
The swimmers with the top 8 times, regardless of heat, advanced to the final.

Rank	Heat	Lane	Name	Nationality	Time	Notes
1	1	5	Evan Austin	United States	4:56.54	Q
2	1	3	Aleksei Ganiuk	Neutral Paralympic Athletes	4:56.68	Q
3	2	3	Ernie Gawilan	Philippines	5:00.13	Q
4	1	4	Federico Bicelli	Italy	5:06.51	Q
5	1	6	Huang Xianquan	China	5:10.55	Q
6	2	4	Andrii Trusov	Ukraine	5:16.03	Q
7	2	5	Iñaki Basiloff	Argentina	5:17.33	Q
8	2	6	Yurii Shenhur	Ukraine	5:19.46	Q
9	2	2	Yosjaniel Hernandez Velez	Cuba	5:26.56	R

== Final ==
400m freestyle final
Rank	Lane	Name	Nationality	Time	Notes
1st place, gold medalist(s)	6	Federico Bicelli	Italy	4:38.70	
2nd place, silver medalist(s)	7	Andrii Trusov	Ukraine	4:40.17	
3rd place, bronze medalist(s)	1	Iñaki Basiloff	Argentina	4:40.27	
4	4	Evan Austin	United States	4:48.91	
5	5	Aleksei Ganiuk	Neutral Paralympic Athletes	4:57.66	
6	3	Ernie Gawilan	Philippines	5:03.18	
7	2	Huang Xianquan	China	5:09.53	
8	8	Yurii Shenhur	Ukraine	5:13.31	
