= 2023 World Para Swimming Championships – Men's 100 metre freestyle =

The men's 100m freestyle events at the 2023 World Para Swimming Championships were held at the Manchester Aquatics Centre between 31 July and 6 August.

== Medalists ==
Event	Gold	Silver	Bronze
S3	Denys Ostapchenko; Ukraine	Diego López Díaz; Mexico	Vincenzo Boni; Italy
S4	Ami Omer Dadaon; Israel	Cameron Leslie; New Zealand	Takayuki Suzuki; Japan
S5	Oleksandr Komarov; Ukraine	Francesco Bocciardo; Italy	Wang Lichao; China
S6	Antonio Fantin; Italy	Talisson Glock; Brazil	Daniel Xavier Mendez; Brazil
S7	Andrii Trusov; Ukraine	Federico Bicelli; Italy	Carlos Serrano Zárate; Colombia
S8	Noah Jaffe; United States	Xu Haijiao; China	Gabriel Cristiano Silva de Sousa; Brazil
S9	Simone Barlaam; Italy	Ugo Didier; France	Malte Braunschweig; Germany
S10	Rowan Crothers; Australia	Stefano Raimondi; Italy	Thomas Gallagher; Australia
S11	Danylo Chufarov; Ukraine	Rogier Dorsman; Netherlands	Mykhailo Serbin; Ukraine
S12	Roman Salei; Azerbaijan	Stephen Clegg; Great Britain	Maksym Veraska; Ukraine
S13	Alex Portal; France	Islam Aslanov; Uzbekistan	Oleksii Virchenko; Ukraine

== Results ==
=== S3 ===
13 swimmers took part in this event, with both the heats and final on Sunday 6 August.

Heats

Rank	Heat	Lane	Name	Nation	Result	Notes
1	2	4	Denys Ostapchenko	Ukraine	1:37.89	
2	1	5	Serhii Palamarchuk	Ukraine	1:40.59	
3	1	4	Vincenzo Boni	Italy	1:42.96	
4	2	5	Diego López Díaz	Italy	1:45.44	
5	2	3	Daniel Ferrer Robles	Spain	1:50.60	
6	1	6	Krzysztof Lechniak	Poland	1:51.55	
7	1	3	Marcos Zarate Rodriguez	Mexico	1:52.37	
8	2	6	Ahmed Kelly	Australia	1:53.44	
9	2	2	Ioannis Kostakis	Greece	2:08.87	
10	1	2	Patricio Larenas	Chile	2:09.82	
11	2	7	Bruno Becker	Brazil	2:16.19	
12	2	1	Youssef Elsayed	Kuwait	2:17.00	
	1	7	Umut Unlu	Turkey		

Final

Rank	Athlete	Nation	Result	Notes
1st place, gold medalist(s)	Denys Ostapchenko	Ukraine	1:35.97	
2nd place, silver medalist(s)	Diego López Díaz	Mexico	1:39.74	
3rd place, bronze medalist(s)	Vincenzo Boni	Italy	1:42.22	
4	Serhii Palamarchuk	Ukraine	1:42.96	
5	Daniel Ferrer Robles	Spain	1:46.45	
6	Krzysztof Lechniak	Poland	1:51.92	
7	Ahmed Kelly	Australia	1:52.11	OC
8	Marcos Zarate Rodriguez	Mexico	1:53.60	

=== S4 ===
Eight swimmers entered this event, which proceeded straight to final on 1 August.

Before the event, the relevant records were as follows.

Record	Swimmer	Time
World record	Ami Omer Dadaon (ISR)	1:19.26
Championship record	Roman Zhdanov (RPC)	1:21.28

Final

Rank	Athlete	Nation	Result	Notes
1st place, gold medalist(s)	Ami Omer Dadaon	Israel	1:18.94	WR CR
2nd place, silver medalist(s)	Cameron Leslie	New Zealand	1:22.56	
3rd place, bronze medalist(s)	Takayuki Suzuki	Japan	1:22.91	
4	Ángel de Jesús Camacho Ramírez	Mexico	1:24.44	
5	Luigi Beggiato	Italy	1:28.59	
6	Gustavo Sánchez Martínez	Mexico	1:31.92	
7	Ariel Malyar	Israel	1:37.64	
8	Jesús Hernández Hernández	Mexico	1:45.21	

=== S5 ===
12 swimmers entered this event, with both heats and finals held on 6 August.

Heats

Rank	Heat	Lane	Name	Nation	Result	Notes
1	1	7	Oleksandr Komarov	Ukraine	1:11.28	Q
2	1	4	Antoni Ponce Bertran	Spain	1:13.45	Q
3	2	4	Francesco Bocciardo	Italy	1:13.51	Q
4	2	5	Muhammad Nur Syaiful Zulkafli	Malaysia	1:15.24	Q
5	1	5	Andrii Drapkin	Ukraine	1:18.46	Q
6	2	6	Wang Lichao	China	1:17.94	Q
7	2	2	Yuan Weiyi	China	1:18.46	Q
8	2	3	Luis Huerta Poza	Spain	1:19.68	Q
9	1	6	Kaede Hinata	Spain	1:20.24	
10	1	2	Phuchit Aingchaiyaphum	Thailand	1:20.25	
11	1	3	Alexandros-Stylianos Lergios	Greece	1:21.69	
12	2	7	Zeyad Kahil	Malaysia	1:24.92	

Final

Rank	Lane	Athlete	Nation	Result	Notes
1st place, gold medalist(s)	4	Oleksandr Komarov	Ukraine	1:08.72	
2nd place, silver medalist(s)	3	Francesco Bocciardo	Italy	1:10.48	
3rd place, bronze medalist(s)	7	Wang Lichao	China	1:13.12	
4	5	Antoni Ponce Bertran	Spain	1:13.63	
5	1	Yuan Weiyi	China	1:13.80	
6	2	Andrii Drapkin	Ukraine	1:14.34	
7	6	Muhammad Nur Syaiful Zulkafli	Malaysia	1:16.53	
8	8	Luis Huerta Poza	Spain	1:19.64	

=== S6 ===
12 swimmers took part in this event, with both the heats and final on Tuesday 1 August.

Before the event, the relevant records were as follows.

Record	Swimmer	Time
World record	Antonio Fantin (Italy) :	1:03.65
Championships record	Antonio Fantin (Italy) :	1:03.65

Heats

Rank	Heat	Lane	Name	Nation	Result	Notes
1	2	4	Antonio Fantin	Italy	1:03.65	Q, =WR, CR
2	2	3	Talisson Glock	Brazil	1:05.66	Q
3	1	4	Laurent Chardard	France	1:06.14	Q
4	1	5	Talisson Glock	Brazil	1:06.25	Q
5	2	5	Nelson Crispín	Colombia	1:07.52	Q
6	1	6	Jesús Alberto Gutiérrez Bermúdez	Mexico	1:10.02	Q
7	1	3	Juan José Gutiérrez Bermúdez	Mexico	1:10.57	Q
8	2	7	Georgios Sfaltos	Mexico	1:11.39	Q
9	1	2	Leo McCrea	Switzerland	1:12.02	
10	2	2	David Rendón	Colombia	1:12.08	
11	2	6	Gabriel Melone de Oliveira	Brazil	1:14.04	
12	1	7	Gary Bejino	Philippines	1:15.31	

Final

Rank	Lane	Name	Nation	Result	Notes
1st place, gold medalist(s)	4	Antonio Fantin	Italy	1:02.98	WR, CR
2nd place, silver medalist(s)	5	Talisson Glock	Brazil	1:04.73	
3rd place, bronze medalist(s)	6	Daniel Xavier Mendes	Brazil	1:05.14	
4	3	Laurent Chardard	France	1:05.85	
5	2	Nelson Crispín	Colombia	1:06.16	
6	7	Jesús Alberto Gutiérrez Bermúdez	Mexico	1:09.62	
7	8	Georgios Sfaltos	Greece	1:11.26	
8	1	Juan José Gutiérrez Bermúdez	Mexico	1:11.86	

=== S7 ===
The applicable records entering the men's 100m freestyle s7 were as follows:

Record	Swimmer	Time
World record	David Roberts (United Kingdom)	1:00.34
Championship record	Andrii Trusov (Ukraine)	1:00.38

Heats

The heats took place on Sun 6 Aug 2023 at 10:17. 9 swimmers entered the event.

Rank	Heat	Lane	Name	Nation	Result	Notes
1	1	4	Federico Bicelli	Italy	1:04.04	
2	2	4	Andrii Trusov	Ukraine	1:04.10	
3	2	3	Soong Toh Wei	Singapore	1:04.99	
4	1	3	Yurii Shenhur	Ukraine	1:05.26	
5	1	5	Inaki Basiloff	Argentina	1:06.44	
6	1	6	Ernie Gawilan	Philippines	1:07.79	
7	2	5	Carlos Serrano Zárate	Colombia	1:08.24	
8	1	2	Lucas Nicolas Poggi	Argentina	1:11.85	
9	2	2	Jose Arregui Facundo	Argentina	1:14.23	

Final

The final took place on Sun 6 Aug 2023 at 18:17

Rank	Lane	Name	Nation	Result	Notes
1st place, gold medalist(s)	5	Andrii Trusov	Ukraine	1:00.09	WR
2nd place, silver medalist(s)	4	Federico Bicelli	Italy	1:00.62	
3rd place, bronze medalist(s)	1	Carlos Serrano Zárate	Colombia	1:02.73	
4	2	Inaki Basiloff	Argentina	1:03.19	
5	3	Soong Toh Wei	Singapore	1:04.91	
6	6	Yurii Shenhur	Ukraine	1:04.92	
7	7	Ernie Gawilan	Philippines	1:08.13	
8	8	Lucas Nicolas Poggi	Argentina	1:10.47	

=== S8 ===
12 swimmers took part in this event, with both the heats and final on Thursday 3 August.

Before the event, the relevant records were as follows.

Record	Swimmer	Time
World record	Denis Tarasov (Russia) :	55.84
Championships record	Denis Tarasov (Russia) :	55.84

Heats

Rank	Heat	Lane	Name	Nation	Result	Notes
1	2	4	Noah Jaffe	United States	59.35	Q, AM
2	2	5	Mark Malyar	Israel	59.74	Q
3	2	3	Gabriel Cristiano Silva de Sousa	Brazil	1:00.57	Q
4	2	2	Xu Haijiao	China	1:00.72	Q
5	1	4	Dimosthenis Michalentzakis	Greece	1:00.79	Q
5	1	5	Alberto Amodeo	Italy	1:00.79	Q
7	1	2	Wu Hongliang	China	1:01.60	Q
8	1	3	Michal Golus	Poland	1:01.73	Q
9	1	7	Kotaro Ogiwara	Japan	1:02.94	
10	2	6	Luis Andrade Guillen	Mexico	1:03.02	
11	2	7	Philippe Vachon	Canada	1:03.05	
12	1	6	Matthew Torres	United States	1:06.24	

Final

Rank	Athlete	Nation	Result	Notes
1st place, gold medalist(s)	Noah Jaffe	United States	59.15	AM
2nd place, silver medalist(s)	Xu Haijiao	China	59.61	
3rd place, bronze medalist(s)	Gabriel Cristiano Silva de Sousa	Brazil	59.78	
4	Dimosthenis Michalentzakis	Greece	59.94	
5	Alberto Amodeo	Italy	1:00.21	
6	Mark Malyar	Israel	1:00.65	
7	Wu Hongliang	China	1:01.48	
8	Michal Golus	Poland	1:01.54	

=== S9 ===
Nine swimmers took part in this event, with both the heats and final on Thursday 3 August.

Before the event, the relevant records were as follows.

Record	Swimmer	Time
World record	Simone Barlaam (Italy) :	52.23
Championships record	Simone Barlaam (Italy) :	52.23

Heats

Rank	Heat	Lane	Name	Nation	Result	Notes
1	2	4	Simone Barlaam	Italy	55.53	Q
2	1	4	Ugo Didier	France	56.79	Q
3	1	5	Malte Braunschweig	Germany	57.12	Q
4	1	3	Dmytro Vasylenko	Ukraine	57.38	Q
5	2	6	Dimosthenis Michalentzakis	Greece	58.13	Q
6	2	3	José Marí Alcaraz	Spain	58.46	Q
7	1	6	Jacobo Garrido Brun	Spain	59.07	Q
8	2	2	Erick Tandazo	Ecuador	1:00.21	Q
	2	5	Jamal Hill	United States	DSQ	

Final

Rank	Athlete	Nation	Result	Notes
1st place, gold medalist(s)	Simone Barlaam	Italy	52.28	
2nd place, silver medalist(s)	Ugo Didier	France	55.20	
3rd place, bronze medalist(s)	Malte Braunschweig	Germany	56.56	
4	Ariel Schrenck Martínez	Spain	57.42	
5	Dmytro Vasylenko	Ukraine	57.62	
6	José Marí Alcaraz	Spain	57.96	
7	Jacobo Garrido Brun	Spain	58.19	
8	Erick Tandazo	Ecuador	59.70	

=== S10 ===
The applicable records entering the men's 100m freestyle S10 were as follows:

Record	Swimmer	Time
World record	Maksym Krypak (Ukraine)	50.64
Championship record	Rowan Crothers (Australia)	50.70

Heats

The heats took place on Sat 5 Aug 2023 at 11:42. 12 swimmers entered. The top eight proceeded to the final.

Rank	Heat	Lane	Name	Nation	Result	Notes
1	2	4	Rowan Crothers	Australia	51.81	Q
2	2	5	Thomas Gallagher	Australia	53.13	Q
3	1	5	P MeloRodrigues	Brazil	54.02	Q
4	1	4	Stefano Raimondi	Italy	54.22	Q
5	2	3	Ihor Nimchenko	Ukraine	54.84	Q
6	2	6	Alan Ogorzalek	Poland	54.91	Q
7	1	3	Florent Marais	France	55.12	Q
8	1	6	David Levecq	Spain	55.51	Q
9	2	2	Nicolas Matias Nieto	Argentina	56.42	
10	1	7	Justin Kaps	Germany	57.02	
11	2	7	Felipe Lima De Souza Ruan	Brazil	57.44	
12	2	1	Oliver Carter	Great Britain	58	

Final

The final took place on Sat 5 Aug 2023 at 20:22

Rank	Lane	Name	Nation	Result	Notes
1st place, gold medalist(s)	4	Rowan Crothers	Australia	51.02	
2nd place, silver medalist(s)	6	Stefano Raimondi	Italy	51.81	
3rd place, bronze medalist(s)	5	Thomas Gallagher	Australia	52.75	
4	3	P Melo Rodrigues	Brazil	53.08	
5	2	Ihor Nimchenko	Ukraine	53.1	
6	7	Alan Ogorzalek	Poland	54.77	
7	1	Florent Marais	France	55.19	
8	8	David Levecq	Spain	55.44	

=== S13 ===
12 swimmers took part in this event, with both the heats and final on Wednesday 2 August.

Before the event, the relevant records were as follows.

Record	Swimmer	Time
World record	Ihar Boki (Israel) :	50.65
Championships record	Ihar Boki (Israel) :	50.74

Heats

Rank	Heat	Lane	Name	Nation	Result	Notes
1	2	5	Alex Portal	France	52.99	Q
2	1	3	Oleksii Virchenko	Ukraine	53.03	Q
3	2	3	Thomas van Wanrooij	Netherlands	53.36	Q
4	2	4	Islam Aslanov	Uzbekistan	53.48	Q
5	1	4	Muzaffar Tursunkhujaev	Uzbekistan	53.90	Q
6	1	5	Kyrylo Garashchenko	Ukraine	53.96	Q
7	2	7	Sergii Klippert	Ukraine	55.03	Q
8	2	2	Enrique José Alhambra Mollar	Spain	55.20	Q
8	1	6	Ivan Salguero Oteiza	Spain	55.20	
10	2	6	Taliso Engel	Germany	55.88	
11	1	7	Nathan Hendricks	South Africa	55.98	
12	1	2	Juan Ferrón Gutiérrez	Spain	58.02	

Final

Rank	Lane	Name	Nation	Result	Notes
1st place, gold medalist(s)	4	Alex Portal	France	52.47	
2nd place, silver medalist(s)	6	Islam Aslanov	Uzbekistan	52.77	
3rd place, bronze medalist(s)	5	Oleksii Virchenko	Ukraine	52.78	
4	7	Kyrylo Garashchenko	Ukraine	53.39	
5	2	Muzaffar Tursunkhujaev	Uzbekistan	53.96	
6	3	Thomas van Wanrooij	Netherlands	54.07	
7	8	Enrique José Alhambra Mollar	Spain	54.45	
8	1	Sergii Klippert	Ukraine	55.64	
