= Swimming at the 2024 Summer Paralympics – Men's 50 metre freestyle S7 =

Men's 50 metre freestyle S7 at the XVII Paralympic Games
- Venue: La Défense Arena
- Dates: 4 September 2024
- Competitors: 13 from 11 nations
- Winning time: 26.38

Medalists
1st place, gold medalist(s)		Andrii Trusov	Ukraine
2nd place, silver medalist(s)		Carlos Serrano Zárate	Colombia
3rd place, bronze medalist(s)		Egor Efrosinin	Neutral Paralympic Athletes

The men's 50 metre freestyle swimming (S7) event at the 2024 Summer Paralympics took place on 4 September 2024, at the La Défense Arena in Paris.

== Records ==
Prior to the competition, the existing world and Paralympic records were as follows.

S6 records

World Record	Xu Qing (CHN)	28.57	London, Great Britain	4 September 2012
Paralympic Record	Xu Qing (CHN)	28.57	London, Great Britain	4 September 2012

S7 records

World Record	Andrii Trusov (UKR)	27.07	London, Great Britain	15 September 2019
Paralympic Record	Pan Shiyun (CHN)	27.35	Rio de Janeiro, Brazil	9 September 2016

== Results ==
=== Heats ===
The heats were started at 10:57.

Rank	Heat	Lane	Name	Nationality	Class	Time	Notes
1	2	4	Andrii Trusov	Ukraine	S7	27.31	Q, PR
2	2	5	Yurii Shenhur	Ukraine	S7	28.05	Q
3	1	4	Carlos Serrano Zárate	Colombia	S7	28.12	Q
4	2	6	Egor Efrosinin	Neutral Paralympic Athletes	S7	28.18	Q
5	1	3	Ievgenii Bogodaiko	Ukraine	S7	29.02	Q
6	1	5	Federico Bicelli	Italy	S7	29.13	Q
7	1	6	Christian Sadie	South Africa	S7	29.27	Q
8	2	3	Toh Wei Soong	Singapore	S7	29.74	Q
9	2	2	Jurijs Semjonovs	Latvia	S7	29.99	
10	2	7	Daniel Mendes	Brazil	S6	30.05	
11	1	7	Jia Hongguang	China	S6	30.10	
12	1	2	Yosjaniel Hernández	Cuba	S7	30.79	
13	2	1	Olvin Cruz	Honduras	S7	51.61	

=== Final ===
The final was held at 19:06.

Rank	Lane	Name	Nationality	Class	Time	Notes
1st place, gold medalist(s)	4	Andrii Trusov	Ukraine	S7	26.38	WR
2nd place, silver medalist(s)	3	Carlos Serrano Zárate	Colombia	S7	27.60	
3rd place, bronze medalist(s)	6	Egor Efrosinin	Neutral Paralympic Athletes	S7	28.02	
4	5	Yurii Shenhur	Ukraine	S7	28.07	
5	7	Federico Bicelli	Italy	S7	28.53	
6	2	Ievgenii Bogodaiko	Ukraine	S7	28.63	
7	1	Christian Sadie	South Africa	S7	28.75	AF
8	8	Toh Wei Soong	Singapore	S7	29.51	
