= Swimming at the 2016 Summer Paralympics – Men's 100 metre breaststroke SB7 =

Men's 100 metre breaststroke SB7 at the XV Paralympic Games
- Venue: Olympic Aquatics Stadium
- Dates: 10 September 2016
- Competitors: 9 from 7 nations

Medalists
1st place, gold medalist(s)		Carlos Serrano Zárate	Colombia
2nd place, silver medalist(s)		Blake Cochrane	Australia
3rd place, bronze medalist(s)		Yang Hong	China

The men's 100 metre breaststroke SB7 event at the 2016 Paralympic Games took place on 10 September 2016, at the Olympic Aquatics Stadium. Two heats were held. The swimmers with the eight fastest times advanced to the final.

== Heats ==
=== Heat 1 ===
9:30 10 September 2016:

Rank	Lane	Name	Nationality	Time	Notes
1	4	Blake Cochrane	Australia	1:20.08	Q
2	6	Yang Hong	China	1:21.27	Q
3	5	Tomotaro Nakamura	Japan	1:21.97	Q
4	3	Evan Austin	United States	1:23.48	Q

=== Heat 2 ===
9:33 10 September 2016:

Rank	Lane	Name	Nationality	Time	Notes
1	4	Carlos Serrano Zárate	Colombia	1:14.01	WR Q
2	5	Simon Boer	Netherlands	1:20.43	Q
3	3	Jianfeng Chen	China	1:22.45	Q
4	6	Rudy Garcia-Tolson	United States	1:23.82	Q
5	2	Pipo Carlomagno	Argentina	1:32.58	

== Final ==
17:30 10 September 2016:

Rank	Lane	Name	Nationality	Time	Notes
1st place, gold medalist(s)	4	Carlos Serrano Zárate	Colombia	1:12.50	WR
2nd place, silver medalist(s)	5	Blake Cochrane	Australia	1:18.66	
3rd place, bronze medalist(s)	6	Yang Hong	China	1:20.21	
4	3	Simon Boer	Netherlands	1:20.44	
5	7	Jianfeng Chen	China	1:21.37	
6	8	Rudy Garcia-Tolson	United States	1:22.45	
7	2	Tomotaro Nakamura	Japan	1:23.46	
8	1	Evan Austin	United States	1:23.55	
