= Tatyana Lebrun =

Belgian Paralympic swimmer

Personal information
- Nationality: Belgian
- Born: 9 December 2004 (age 21) Stavelot, Belgium

Sport
- Sport: Swimming
- Strokes: Breaststroke, Medley, Butterfly stroke
- Club: Schwimmschule St. Vith
- Coach: Philippe Midrez; Yannick Zeimers
Medal record
Representing Belgium
World Para Swimming Championships
Bronze medal – third place	2022 Funchal	100 m breaststroke SB9
World Para Swimming European Championships
Silver medal – second place	2024 Funchal	200 m medley SM10
Bronze medal – third place	2024 Funchal	100 m breaststroke SB9

Tatyana Lebrun (born 9 December 2004) is a Belgian Paralympic swimmer. She competes in classification S10 (S10, SB9 and SM10).

== Biography ==
Lebrun, like her mother and grandmother, was born with Larsen syndrome, a congenital disorder that affects bones and joints and that in her case a.o. has left her without a patella in the right knee. Although initially doctors announced that she would probably never be able to walk, after undergoing multiple surgeries at feet and knees, she now swims at the highest level. After initially competing in the valid circuit, a disqualification for a bad breaststroke movement made her turn to the disabled circuit.

== Personal ==
Lebrun studies physiotherapy at the University of Liège, Belgium, a vocation largely inspired by the team that surrounds her on a daily basis.

== Competitions ==
Upon her arrival in the Francophone Handisport League, Lebron won four medals, including two gold and two bronze, at the European Para Youth Games.

Having received a wild card for the 2020 Summer Paralympics, at age 16, Lebrun was the youngest member of Team Belgium in Tokyo. At those Olympics, she was disappointed to finish 6th in her heats and 11th overall of the 200 metres breaststrike SB9.

A year later, in June 2022, after posting a personal best of 1:18.45 in the heats, she took a bronze medal, and Belgium's first medal at the World Para Swimming Championships since 2017, at the 2022 World Para Swimming Championships in Funchal, Madeira, Portugal, in the 200 metres breaststroke SB9. Immediately after these championships, she won another 2 gold medals at the 2022 European Para Youth Games in Lahti, Finland, one in her favorite discipline, the 100 meter breaststroke, and another one in the 50 metres freestyle.

In April 2024, she won her first European medals by winning two medals at the 2024 World Para Swimming European Open Championships in Funchal, Madeira, Portugal: a silver medal in the 200 metres individual medley SM10, and a bronze medal in the 100 metres breaststroke SB9.

== Awards ==
In 2020 Lebrun was winner of the ENGIE "Talent of the Year award".
