= 2023 World Para Swimming Championships – Men's 200 metre individual medley =

The men's 200m individual medley events at the 2023 World Para Swimming Championships were held at the Manchester Aquatics Centre between 31 July and 6 August.

== Medalists ==
Event	Gold	Silver	Bronze
SM5	Guo Jincheng; China	Antoni Ponce Bertran; Spain	Wang Lichao; China
SM6	Nelson Crispín; Colombia	Jesús Alberto Gutiérrez Bermúdez; Mexico	Juan Jose Guttierez; Mexico
SM7	Andrii Trusov; Ukraine	Carlos Serrano Zárate; Colombia	Iñaki Basiloff; Argentina
SM8	Xu Haijiao; China	Diogo Cancela; Portugal	Mark Malyar; Israel
SM9	Timothy Hodge; Australia	Ugo Didier; France	Federico Morlacchi; Italy
SM10	Stefano Raimondi; Italy	Col Pearse; Australia	Alex Saffy; Australia
SM11	Danylo Chufarov; Ukraine	Rogier Dorsman; Netherlands	Mykhailo Serbin; Ukraine
SM13	Alex Portal; France	Thomas van Wanrooij; Netherlands	Kyrylo Garashchenko; Ukraine
SM14	Nicholas Bennett; Canada	Rhys Darbey; Great Britain	Dmytro Vanzenko; Ukraine

== Results ==
=== SM7 ===
Final

Six swimmers from five nations took part.

Rank	Name	Nation	Result	Notes
1st place, gold medalist(s)	Andrii Trusov	Ukraine	2:28.19	WR
2nd place, silver medalist(s)	Carlos Serrano Zárate	Colombia	2:29.62	AM
3rd place, bronze medalist(s)	Iñaki Basiloff	Argentina	2:32.32	
4	Christian Sadie	South Africa	2:36.10	
5	Niranjan Mukundan	India	2:57.92	
	Ievgenii Bogodaiko	Ukraine	DSQ	

=== SM11 ===
Final

Seven swimmers from six nations took part.

Rank	Name	Nation	Result	Notes
1st place, gold medalist(s)	Danylo Chufarov	Ukraine	2:18.16	WR
2nd place, silver medalist(s)	Rogier Dorsman	Netherlands	2:20.79	
3rd place, bronze medalist(s)	Mykhailo Serbin	Ukraine	2:27.55	
4	David Kratochvil	Czech Republic	2:28.51	
5	Uchu Tomita	Japan	2:31.04	
6	José Ramón Cantero Elvira	Spain	2:36.16	
7	Karim Gouda Said Hessan	Italy	2:40.81	
