= Swimming at the 2020 Summer Paralympics – Men's 400 metre freestyle S7 =

Men's 400 metre freestyle S7 at the XVI Paralympic Games
- Venue: Tokyo Aquatics Centre
- Dates: 27 August 2021
- Competitors: 9 from 9 nations

Medalists
| 1st place, gold medalist(s) | | Mark Malyar | Israel |
| 2nd place, silver medalist(s) | | Andrii Trusov | Ukraine |
| 3rd place, bronze medalist(s) | | Evan Austin | United States |

The Men's 400 metre freestyle S7 event at the 2020 Paralympic Games will be taken place on 27 August 2021 at the Tokyo Aquatics Centre.

== Records ==
| World Record | Mark Malyar (ISR) | 4:33.64 | London, Great Britain | 10 September 2019 |
| Paralympic Record | Josef Craig (GBR) | 4:42.81 | London, Great Britain | 6 September 2012 |

== Heats ==
The swimmers with the top 8 times, regardless of heat, advanced to the final.

| Rank | Heat | Lane | Name | Nationality | Time | Notes |
|---|---|---|---|---|---|---|
| 1 | 2 | 4 | Mark Malyar | Israel | 4:41.82 | |
| 2 | 2 | 3 | Federico Bicelli | Italy | 4:45.53 | |
| 3 | 2 | 5 | Iñaki Basiloff | Argentina | 4:46.17 | |
| 4 | 1 | 4 | Andrii Trusov | Ukraine | 4:57.23 | |
| 5 | 1 | 5 | Evan Austin | United States | 4:57.35 | |
| 6 | 2 | 6 | Ernie Gawilan | Philippines | 4:58.58 | |
| 7 | 1 | 6 | Toh Wei Soong | Singapore | 5:03.82 | |
| 8 | 2 | 2 | Chen Liang-da | Chinese Taipei | 5:15.89 | |
| 9 | 1 | 3 | Andrei Gladkov | RPC | 5:16.36 | |

Q

== Final ==
400m freestyle final
| Rank | Lane | Name | Nationality | Time | Notes |
|---|---|---|---|---|---|
| 1st place, gold medalist(s) | | Mark Malyar | Israel | 4:31.06 | WR |
| 2nd place, silver medalist(s) | | Andrii Trusov | Ukraine | 4:35.56 | |
| 3rd place, bronze medalist(s) | | Evan Austin | United States | 4:38.95 | |
| 4 | | Iñaki Basiloff | Argentina | 4:38.99 | |
| 5 | | Federico Bicelli | Italy | 4:43.67 | |
| 6 | | Ernie Gawilan | Philippines | 4:56.24 | |
| 7 | | Toh Wei Soong | Singapore | 5:06.39 | |
| 8 | | Chen Liang-da | Chinese Taipei | 5:10.65 | |
