= Andrii Trusov =

Ukrainian Paralympic swimmer

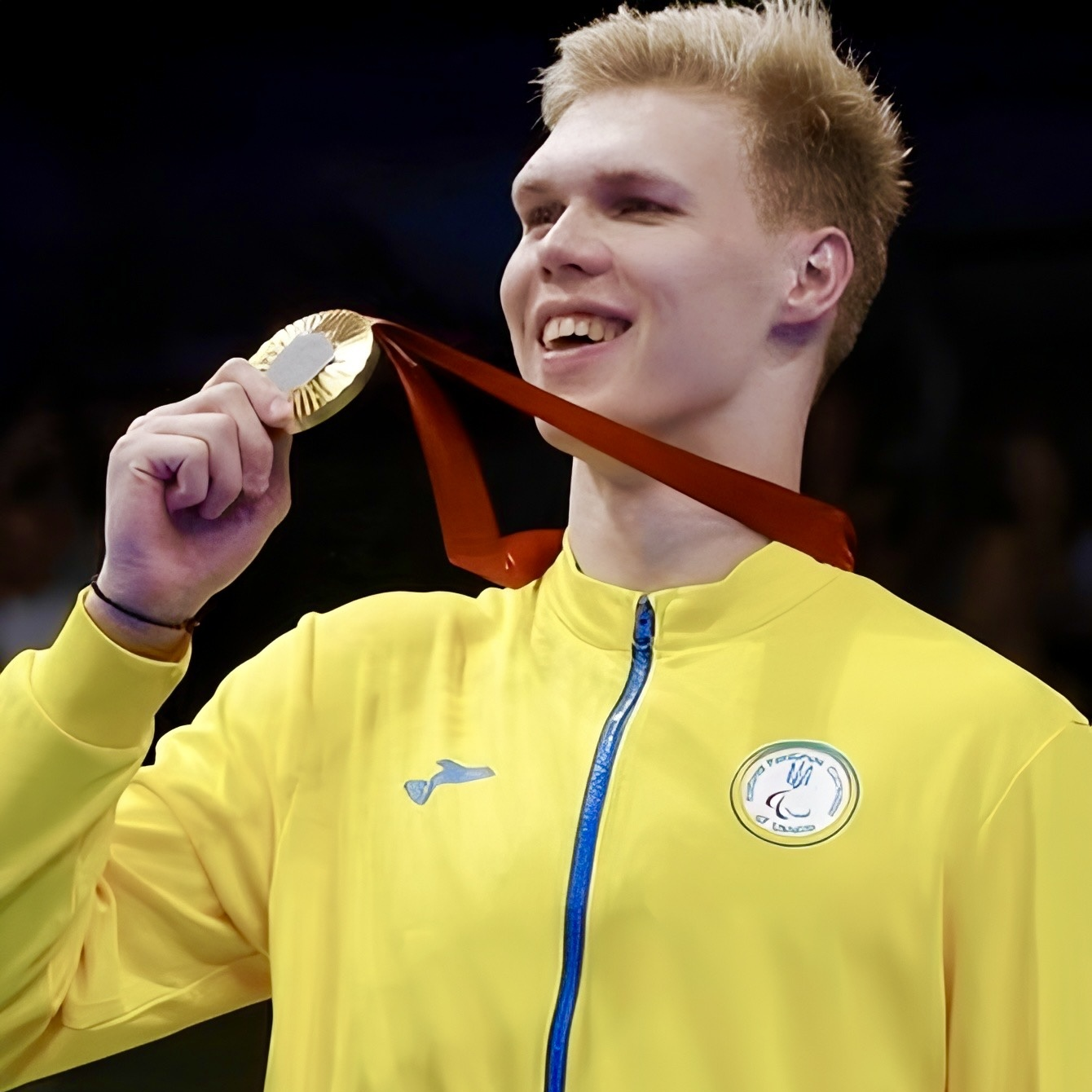
- Trusov at the 2024 Summer Paralympics

Personal information
- Nationality: Ukrainian
- Born: 7 April 2000 (age 26)

Sport
- Sport: Paralympic swimming
- Disability class: S7, SM7
- Coached by: Andriy Kaznacheyev; Svitlana Kaznacheyeva
Medal record
Men's para swimming
Representing Ukraine
| Event | 1st | 2nd | 3rd |
|---|---|---|---|
| Paralympics | 4 | 5 | 1 |
| World Championships | 14 | 2 | 5 |
| European Championships | 7 | 3 | 3 |
| Total | 25 | 10 | 9 |
Paralympic Games
| Gold medal – first place | 2020 Tokyo | 50 m freestyle S7 |
| Gold medal – first place | 2020 Tokyo | 100 m backstroke S7 |
| Gold medal – first place | 2024 Paris | 50 m freestyle S7 |
| Gold medal – first place | 2024 Paris | 50 m butterfly S7 |
| Silver medal – second place | 2020 Tokyo | 400 m freestyle S7 |
| Silver medal – second place | 2020 Tokyo | 50 m butterfly S7 |
| Silver medal – second place | 2024 Paris | 400 m freestyle S7 |
| Silver medal – second place | 2024 Paris | 100 m backstroke S7 |
| Silver medal – second place | 2024 Paris | 200 m ind. medley SM7 |
| Bronze medal – third place | 2020 Tokyo | 4×100 m freestyle 34 pts |
World Championships
| Gold medal – first place | 2019 London | 50 m freestyle S7 |
| Gold medal – first place | 2022 Madeira | 100 m backstroke S7 |
| Gold medal – first place | 2022 Madeira | 50 m butterfly S7 |
| Gold medal – first place | 2022 Madeira | 50 m freestyle S7 |
| Gold medal – first place | 2022 Madeira | 100 m freestyle S7 |
| Gold medal – first place | 2023 Manchester | 100 m backstroke S7 |
| Gold medal – first place | 2023 Manchester | 50 m butterfly S7 |
| Gold medal – first place | 2023 Manchester | 50 m freestyle S7 |
| Gold medal – first place | 2023 Manchester | 100 m freestyle S7 |
| Gold medal – first place | 2023 Manchester | 200 m ind. medley SM7 |
| Gold medal – first place | 2025 Singapore | 100 m backstroke S7 |
| Gold medal – first place | 2025 Singapore | 50 m butterfly S7 |
| Gold medal – first place | 2025 Singapore | 50 m freestyle S7 |
| Gold medal – first place | 2025 Singapore | 100 m freestyle S7 |
| Silver medal – second place | 2019 London | 400 m freestyle S7 |
| Silver medal – second place | 2019 London | 4x100 m freestyle relay 34pts |
| Bronze medal – third place | 2019 London | 100 m freestyle S7 |
| Bronze medal – third place | 2019 London | 200 m ind. medley SM7 |
| Bronze medal – third place | 2022 Madeira | 400 m freestyle S7 |
| Bronze medal – third place | 2022 Madeira | 200 m ind. medley SM7 |
| Bronze medal – third place | 2023 Manchester | 400 m freestyle S7 |
European Championships
| Gold medal – first place | 2020 Funchal | 50 m freestyle S7 |
| Gold medal – first place | 2020 Funchal | 400 m freestyle S7 |
| Gold medal – first place | 2024 Madeira | 100 m backstroke S7 |
| Gold medal – first place | 2024 Madeira | 100 m freestyle S7 |
| Gold medal – first place | 2024 Madeira | 200 m ind. medley SM7 |
| Gold medal – first place | 2024 Madeira | 400 m freestyle S7 |
| Gold medal – first place | 2024 Madeira | 50 m freestyle S7 |
| Silver medal – second place | 2020 Funchal | 100 m freestyle S7 |
| Silver medal – second place | 2020 Funchal | 200 m ind. medley SM7 |
| Silver medal – second place | 2024 Madeira | 50 m butterfly S7 |
| Bronze medal – third place | 2018 Dublin | 100 m freestyle S7 |
| Bronze medal – third place | 2020 Funchal | 200 m ind. medley SM7 |
| Bronze medal – third place | 2024 Madeira | 100 m breaststroke SB6 |

Andrii Trusov (Ukrainian: Андрій Андрійович Трусов; born 7 April 2000) is a Ukrainian Paralympic swimmer. He represented Ukraine at the 2020 and 2024 Summer Paralympics.

== Career ==
Trusov represented Ukraine at the 2020 Summer Paralympics, winning gold in the 50 metre freestyle S7 and 100 metre backstroke S7 events, and silver in the 400 metre freestyle S7 and 50 metre butterfly S7 events. He represented Ukraine at the 2024 Summer Paralympics, winning gold in the 50 metre freestyle S7 and 50 metre butterfly S7 events, and silver medals in the 100 metre backstroke S7, 400 metre freestyle S7 and 200 metre medley SM7 events.

At the 2025 World Para Swimming Championships in Singapore, Trusov won four gold medals: the men's 100 m backstroke S7 (Day 4), 50 m butterfly S7 (Day 5), 50 m freestyle S7 (Day 6) and 100 m freestyle S7 (Day 7).
