= Aleksei Ganiuk =

Russian Paralympic swimmer (born 1999)

Personal information
- Nationality: Russian
- Born: 2 August 1999 (age 26)

Sport
- Sport: Para swimming
- Disability class: S7, SM7
Medal record
Men's para swimming
Representing Neutral Paralympic Athletes
World Championships
Bronze medal – third place	2025 Singapore	100 m freestyle S7
Gold medal – first place	2025 Singapore	400 m freestyle S7
Bronze medal – third place	2025 Singapore	200 m medley SM7
European Championships
Gold medal – first place	2024 Funchal	100 m backstroke S7

Aleksei Ganiuk (born 2 August 1999) is a Russian para swimmer who represented Neutral Paralympic Athletes at the 2024 Summer Paralympics.

== Career ==
Ganiuk represented Neutral Paralympic Athletes at the 2024 Summer Paralympics. In September 2025, he competed at the 2025 World Para Swimming Championships and won bronze medals in the 400 metre freestyle S7 and 200 metre individual medley SM7 events.
