= 2019 World Para Swimming Championships – Men's 50 metre butterfly =

The men's 50m butterfly events at the 2019 World Para Swimming Championships were held in the London Aquatics Centre at the Queen Elizabeth Olympic Park in London between 9–15 September.

== Medalists ==
Event	Gold	Silver	Bronze
S5	Wang Lichao; China	Yaroslav Semenenko; Ukraine	Daniel Dias; Brazil
S6	Wang Jingang; China	Laurent Chardard; France	Nelson Crispín; Colombia
S7	Evan Austin; United States	Yevhenii Bohodaiko; Ukraine	Carlos Serrano Zárate; Colombia
