= 2024 World Para Swimming European Open Championships =

Swimming competition in Funchal, Portugal

World Para Swimming European Open Championships 2024
- Host city: Funchal, Portugal
- Date: 21–27 April 2024
- Venue: Penteada Olympic Pools Complex
- Nations: 49
- Athletes: 425

The 2024 World Para Swimming European Open Championships took place in Funchal, Portugal from 21 to 27 April 2024. It was the 7th edition of the Championships and the third hosted in Portugal. Italy topped the medal table, followed by Ukraine and the Netherlands.

The Championships were also open to non-European nations to offer athletes and teams an important test ahead of the 2024 Summer Paralympics in Paris.

== Medals ==
=== European ===
Performances by guest non-european swimmers are ignored for the purposes of the European championships results, and the top three Europeans in each event receive gold, silver and bronze medals. Italy topped the medal table in golds, with Ukraine earning the most total medals for the fifth time in a row. Ukraine dominated men's swimming with 15 golds, while Italy led women's swimming with 13 golds. Hosts Portugal finished 20th, with 3 medals, all of which were silver.

Rank	Nation	Gold	Silver	Bronze	Total
1	Italy (ITA)	26	21	16	63
–	Individual Neutral Athletes	25	18	32	75
2	Ukraine (UKR)	21	26	21	68
3	Netherlands (NED)	13	8	7	28
4	Great Britain (GBR)	13	8	5	26
5	Spain (ESP)	10	15	14	39
6	France (FRA)	8	8	9	25
7	Germany (GER)	7	6	5	18
8	Israel (ISR)	6	5	3	14
9	Ireland (IRL)	3	4	5	12
10	Switzerland (SUI)	3	1	1	5
11	Hungary (HUN)	2	5	3	10
12	Turkey (TUR)	2	4	6	12
13	Poland (POL)	2	2	0	4
14	Azerbaijan (AZE)	2	1	1	4
15	Czech Republic (CZE)	1	4	4	9
16	Greece (GRE)	1	3	2	6
17	Croatia (CRO)	1	1	2	4
18	Cyprus (CYP)	1	1	0	2
19	Bosnia and Herzegovina (BIH)	1	0	0	1
20	Portugal (POR)*	0	3	0	3
21	Austria (AUT)	0	1	2	3
21	Belgium (BEL)	0	1	2	3
21	Lithuania (LTU)	0	1	2	3
24	Slovakia (SVK)	0	1	1	2
25	Sweden (SWE)	0	0	2	2
26	Estonia (EST)	0	0	1	1
26	Finland (FIN)	0	0	1	1
26	Iceland (ISL)	0	0	1	1
Totals (28 entries)		148	148	148	444

=== Open ===
Performances by non-European competitors are recognised in the open classification, which awards medals on the basis of the actual race results regardless of nationality. As competitors receive the higher medal of any earned in the two competition, for European competitors, the European Championships medal will always take precedence, so where e.g. a non-European athlete has finished second, the athlete in third receives a European silver in the podium ceremony, but not the open bronze, the athlete in fourth a European bronze, and the athlete in second an open or 'commemorative' silver. The following table, however, counts ONLY those medals notionally won in the open classification, even if a higher medal was awarded during the podium ceremony from European Championships position.

Rank	Nation	Gold	Silver	Bronze	Total
1	Italy	25	20	15	60
–	Individual Neutral Athletes	23	20	27	70
2	Ukraine	19	24	21	64
3	Netherlands	13	8	6	27
4	Great Britain	13	8	4	25
5	Spain	10	11	12	33
6	France	7	9	8	24
7	Germany	7	5	4	16
8	Israel	5	6	3	14
9	Australia*	4	2	7	13
10	Switzerland	3	1	1	5
11	Turkey	2	4	6	12
12	Hungary	2	4	3	9
13	Ireland	2	3	7	12
14	Poland	2	2	0	4
15	Azerbaijan	2	1	1	4
16	Singapore*	2	0	0	2
17	Czech Republic	1	4	4	9
18	Greece	1	2	2	5
19	United States*	1	2	1	4
20	Croatia	1	1	1	3
21	Cyprus	1	1	0	2
22	Bosnia and Herzegovina	1	0	0	1
22	Mexico*	1	0	0	1
24	Portugal	0	2	1	3
24	Uzbekistan*	0	2	1	3
26	China*	0	2	0	2
27	South Africa*	0	1	3	4
28	Belgium	0	1	2	3
28	Lithuania	0	1	2	3
30	Slovakia	0	1	0	1
31	Austria	0	0	2	2
31	Brazil*	0	0	2	2
33	Estonia	0	0	1	1
33	Sweden	0	0	1	1
Totals (34 entries)		148	148	148	444

== Medalists ==
The following list is of the European Championship medalists

=== Men ===
==== Freestyle ====
Event		Gold	Silver	Bronze
50 metre	S3	Dimitri Granjux (FRA)	Josia Topf (GER)	Serhii Palamarchuk (UKR)
50 metre	S4	Ami Omer Dadaon (ISR)	Ariel Malyar (ISR)	Roman Zhdanov (NPA)
50 metre	S5	Oleksandr Komarov (UKR)	Francesco Bocciardo (ITA)	Kirill Pulver (NPA)
50 metre	S7	Andrii Trusov (UKR)	Turgut Aslan Yaraman (TUR)	Yurii Shenhur (UKR)
50 metre	S9	Simone Barlaam (ITA)	Denis Tarasov (NPA)	Bogdan Mozgovoi (NPA)
50 metre	S10	Ihor Nimchenko (UKR)	Stefano Raimondi (ITA)	Sergii Shevtsov (UKR)
50 metre	S11	Rogier Dorsman (NED)	David Kratochvil (CZE); Edgaras Matakas (LTU)	Not awarded
50 metre	S13	Ihar Boki (NPA)	Oleksii Virchenko (UKR)	Maksym Veraksa (UKR)
100 metre	S4	Ami Omer Dadaon (ISR)	Federico Cristiani (ITA)	Roman Zhdanov (NPA)
100 metre	S5	Oleksandr Komarov (UKR)	Kirill Pulver (NPA)	Francesco Bocciardo (ITA)
100 metre	S6	Antonio Fantin (ITA)	Laurent Chardard (FRA)	Thijs van Hofweegen (NED)
100 metre	S7	Andrii Trusov (UKR)	Turgut Aslan Yaraman (TUR)	Federico Bicelli (ITA)
100 metre	S8	Mark Malyar (ISR)	Dimosthenis Michalentzakis (GRE)	Andrei Nikolaev (NPA)
100 metre	S9	Simone Barlaam (ITA)	Ugo Didier (FRA)	Bogdan Mozgovoi (NPA)
100 metre	S10	Stefano Raimondi (ITA)	Ihor Nimchenko (UKR)	Dmitry Grigoryev (NPA)
100 metre	S11	Rogier Dorsman (NED)	Danylo Chufarov (UKR)	Edgaras Matakas (LTU)
100 metre	S12	Iaroslav Denysenko (UKR)	Maksym Veraksa (UKR)	Raman Salei (AZE)
100 metre	S13	Ihar Boki (NPA)	Oleksii Virchenko (UKR)	Alex Portal (FRA)
200 metre	S2	Vladimir Danilenko (NPA)	Jacek Czech (POL)	Iyad Shalabi (ISR)
200 metre	S3	Dimitri Granjux (FRA)	Denys Ostapchenko (UKR)	Umut Ünlü (TUR)
200 metre	S4	Ami Omer Dadaon (ISR)	Roman Zhdanov (NPA)	Luigi Beggiato (ITA)
200 metre	S5	Francesco Bocciardo (ITA)	Kirill Pulver (NPA)	Oleksandr Komarov (UKR)
200 metre	S14	William Ellard (GBR)	Dmytro Vanzenko (UKR)	Nader Khalili (FIN)
400 metre	S6	Antonio Fantin (ITA)	Andrei Granichka (NPA)	Thijs van Hofweegen (NED)
400 metre	S7	Andrii Trusov (UKR)	Federico Bicelli (ITA)	Turgut Aslan Yaraman (TUR)
400 metre	S8	Alberto Amodeo (ITA)	Andrei Nikolaev (NPA)	Mark Malyar (ISR)
400 metre	S9	Ugo Didier (FRA)	Jacobo Garrido Brun (ESP)	Sam De Visser (BEL)
400 metre	S11	Rogier Dorsman (NED)	David Kratochvil (CZE)	Danylo Chufarov (UKR)
400 metre	S13	Ihar Boki (NPA)	Alex Portal (FRA); Kyrylo Garashchenko (UKR)	Not awarded

==== Backstroke ====
Event		Gold	Silver	Bronze
50 metre	S1	Iyad Shalabi (ISR)	Anton Kol (UKR)	Francesco Bettella (ITA)
50 metre	S2	Jacek Czech (POL)	Vladimir Danilenko (NPA)	Roman Bondarenko (UKR)
50 metre	S3	Denys Ostapchenko (UKR)	Josia Topf (GER)	Dimitri Granjux (FRA)
50 metre	S4	Roman Zhdanov (NPA)	Arnošt Petráček (CZE)	Matz Topkin (EST)
50 metre	S5	Iaroslav Semenenko (UKR)	Antoni Ponce Bertran (ESP)	Kirill Pulver (NPA)
100 metre	S1	Anton Kol (UKR)	Iyad Shalabi (ISR)	Francesco Bettella (ITA)
100 metre	S2	Vladimir Danilenko (NPA)	Jacek Czech (POL)	Roman Bondarenko (UKR)
100 metre	S6	Aleksei Ganiuk (NPA)	Dino Sinovčić (CRO)	Thijs van Hofwegen (NED)
100 metre	S7	Andrii Trusov (UKR)	Turgut Aslan Yaraman (TUR)	Yurii Shenhur (UKR)
100 metre	S8	Iñigo Llopis Sanz (ESP)	Mark Malyar (ISR)	Bohdan Hrynenko (UKR)
100 metre	S9	Ugo Didier (FRA)	Yahor Shchalkanau (NPA)	Bogdan Mozgovoi (NPA)
100 metre	S10	Olivier van de Voort (NED)	Stefano Raimondi (ITA)	Riccardo Menciotti (ITA)
100 metre	S11	David Kratochvil (CZE)	Marco Meneses (POR)	Rogier Dorsman (NED)
100 metre	S12	Raman Salei (AZE)	Iaroslav Denysenko (UKR)	Maksim Vashkevich (NPA)
100 metre	S13	Vladimir Sotnikov (NPA)	Ihar Boki (NPA)	Thomas van Wanrooij (NED)
100 metre	S14	Mark Tompsett (GBR)	William Ellard (GBR)	Marc Evers (NED)

==== Breaststroke ====
Event		Gold	Silver	Bronze
50 metre	SB2	Ismail Barlov (BIH)	Emmanuele Marigliano (ITA)	Ioannis Kostakis (GRE)
50 metre	SB3	Ami Omer Dadaon (ISR)	Efrem Morelli (ITA)	Miguel Luque Ávila (ESP)
100 metre	SB4	Dmitrii Cherniaev (NPA)	Antonios Tsapatakis (GRE)	Aleksandr Molkov (NPA)
100 metre	SB5	Antoni Ponce Bertran (ESP)	Andrei Granichka (NPA)	Leo McCrea (SUI)
100 metre	SB6	Ievgenii Bogodaiko (UKR)	Thijs van Hofweegen (NED)	Andrii Trusov (UKR)
100 metre	SB8	Andrei Kalina (NPA)	Oscar Salguero Galisteo (ESP)	Daniil Smirnov (NPA)
100 metre	SB9	Stefano Raimondi (ITA)	Hector Denayer (FRA)	Artem Isaev (NPA)
100 metre	SB11	Rogier Dorsman (NED)	Danylo Chufarov (UKR)	Edgaras Matakas (LTU)
100 metre	SB12	Vali Israfilov (AZE)	Oleksii Fedyna (UKR)	Uladzimir Izotau (NPA)
100 metre	SB13	Taliso Engel (GER)	Thomas van Wanrooij (NED)	Maksim Nikiforov (NPA)
100 metre	SB14	Harry Stewart (GBR)	Vasyl Krainyk (UKR)	Artem Pavlenko (NPA)

==== Butterfly ====
Event		Gold	Silver	Bronze
50 metre	S5	Oleksandr Komarov (UKR)	Antoni Ponce Bertran (ESP)	Alexandros-Stylianos Lergios (GRE)
50 metre	S6	Laurent Chardard (FRA)	David Sánchez Sierra (ESP)	Andrei Granichka (NPA)
50 metre	S7	Turgut Aslan Yaraman (TUR)	Andrii Trusov (UKR)	Ievgenii Bogodaiko (UKR)
100 metre	S8	Alberto Amodeo (ITA)	Diogo Cancela (POR)	Iñigo Llopis Sanz (ESP)
100 metre	S9	Simone Barlaam (ITA)	Malte Braunschweig (GER)	Barry McClements (IRL)
100 metre	S10	Stefano Raimondi (ITA)	Ihor Nimchenko (UKR)	Riccardo Menciotti (ITA)
100 metre	S11	Rogier Dorsman (NED)	David Kratochvil (CZE)	Mykhailo Serbin (UKR)
100 metre	S12	Egor Kuzmin (NPA)	Raman Salei (AZE)	Iaroslav Denysenko (UKR)
100 metre	S13	Ihar Boki (NPA)	Alex Portal (FRA)	Oleksii Virchenko (UKR)
100 metre	S14	William Ellard (GBR)	Dmytro Vanzenko (UKR)	Róbert Ísak Jónsson (ISL)

==== Individual medley ====
Event		Gold	Silver	Bronze
150 metre	SM3	Dimitri Granjux (FRA)	Josia Topf (GER)	Umut Ünlü (TUR)
150 metre	SM4	Roman Zhdanov (NPA)	Ami Omer Dadaon (ISR)	Andreas Ernhofer (AUT)
200 metre	SM6	Andrei Granichka (NPA)	Bruce Dee (GBR)	Antoni Ponce Bertran (ESP)
200 metre	SM7	Andrii Trusov (UKR)	Ievgenii Bogodaiko (UKR)	Egor Efrosinin (NPA)
200 metre	SM8	Dimosthenis Michalentzakis (GRE)	Diogo Cancela (POR)	Mark Malyar (ISR)
200 metre	SM9	Ugo Didier (FRA)	Hector Denayer (FRA)	Andrei Kalina (NPA)
200 metre	SM10	Stefano Raimondi (ITA)	Riccardo Menciotti (ITA)	Artem Isaev (NPA)
200 metre	SM11	Rogier Dorsman (NED)	Danylo Chufarov (UKR)	David Kratochvil (CZE)
200 metre	SM13	Ihar Boki (NPA)	Vladimir Sotnikov (NPA)	Alex Portal (FRA)
200 metre	SM14	Dmytro Vanzenko (UKR)	Vasyl Krainyk (UKR)	William Ellard (GBR)

=== Women ===
==== Freestyle ====
Event		Gold	Silver	Bronze
50 metre	S3	Marta Fernández Infante (ESP)	Ellie Challis (GBR)	Zoya Shchurova (NPA)
50 metre	S4	Gina Böttcher (GER)	Nataliia Butkova (NPA)	Delia Fontcuberta Cervera (ESP)
50 metre	S5	Iryna Poida (UKR)	Monica Boggioni (ITA)	Agáta Koupilová (CZE)
50 metre	S6	Nicole Turner (IRL); Nora Meister (SUI)	Not awarded	Dearbhaile Brady (IRL)
50 metre	S8	Viktoriia Ishchiulova (NPA)	Xenia Palazzo (ITA)	Paula Novina (CRO)
50 metre	S10	Alessia Scortechini (ITA)	Elizaveta Sidorenko (NPA)	Emeline Pierre (FRA)
50 metre	S11	Karolina Pelendritou (CYP)	Liesette Bruinsma (NED)	Maryna Piddubna (UKR)
50 metre	S13	Carlotta Gilli (ITA)	Emma Feliu (ESP); Marian Polo López (ESP)	Not awarded
100 metre	S3	Marta Fernández Infante (ESP)	Ellie Challis (GBR)	Zoya Shchurova (NPA)
100 metre	S5	Monica Boggioni (ITA)	Iryna Poida (UKR)	Agáta Koupilová (CZE)
100 metre	S6	Nora Meister (SUI)	Grace Harvey (GBR)	Evelin Száraz (HUN)
100 metre	S7	Veronika Korzhova (UKR)	Leyre Ortí Campos (ESP)	Giulia Terzi (ITA)
100 metre	S9	Sarai Gascón Moreno (ESP)	Núria Marquès (ESP)	Florianne Bultje (NED)
100 metre	S10	Lisa Kruger (NED)	Emeline Pierre (FRA)	Alessia Scortechini (ITA)
100 metre	S11	Liesette Bruinsma (NED)	Daria Lukianenko (NPA)	Maryna Piddubna (UKR)
100 metre	S12	Anna Stetsenko (UKR)	Alessia Berra (ITA)	María Delgado (ESP)
100 metre	S13	Carlotta Gilli (ITA)	Emma Feliu (ESP)	Aleksandra Ziablitseva (NPA)
200 metre	S5	Monica Boggioni (ITA)	Iryna Poida (UKR)	Agáta Koupilová (CZE)
200 metre	S14	Valeriia Shabalina (NPA)	Olivia Newman-Baronius (GBR)	Pernilla Lindberg (SWE)
400 metre	S6	Nora Meister (SUI)	Maisie Summers-Newton (GBR)	Verena Schott (GER)
400 metre	S7	Veronika Korzhova (UKR)	Charlotte Kast (GER)	Nicola St. Clair Maitland (SWE)
400 metre	S8	Xenia Palazzo (ITA)	Nahia Zudaire Borrezo (ESP)	Mariia Pavlova (NPA)
400 metre	S9	Emma Mečić (CRO)	Zsófia Konkoly (HUN)	Vittoria Bianco (ITA)
400 metre	S10	Oliwia Jabłońska (POL)	Bianka Pap (HUN)	Élodie Lorandi (FRA)
400 metre	S11	Liesette Bruinsma (NED)	Tatiana Blattnerová (SVK)	Eliza Humphrey (GBR)
400 metre	S13	Carlotta Gilli (ITA)	Anna Stetsenko (UKR)	Róisín Ní Ríain (IRL)

==== Backstroke ====
Event		Gold	Silver	Bronze
50 metre	S2	Angela Procida (ITA)	Diana Koltsova (NPA)	Teresa Perales (ESP)
50 metre	S3	Ellie Challis (GBR)	Zoya Shchurova (NPA)	Marta Fernández Infante (ESP)
50 metre	S4	Gina Böttcher (GER)	Alexandra Stamatopoulou (GRE)	Maryna Verbova (UKR)
50 metre	S5	Iryna Poida (UKR)	Sevilay Öztürk (TUR)	Sümeyye Boyacı (TUR)
100 metre	S2	Diana Koltsova (NPA)	Angela Procida (ITA)	Zsanett Adámi (HUN)
100 metre	S6	Verena Schott (GER)	Nora Meister (SUI)	Arianna Talamona (ITA)
100 metre	S8	Viktoriia Ishchiulova (NPA)	Xenia Palazzo (ITA)	Mira Jeanne Maack (GER)
100 metre	S9	Núria Marquès (ESP)	Beatriz Lérida Maldonado (ESP)	Emma Mečić (CRO)
100 metre	S10	Bianka Pap (HUN)	Lisa Kruger (NED)	Anaëlle Roulet (FRA)
100 metre	S11	Daria Lukianenko (NPA)	Maryna Piddubna (UKR)	Kateryna Tkachuk (UKR)
100 metre	S12	Anna Stetsenko (UKR)	María Delgado (ESP)	Léane Morceau (FRA)
100 metre	S13	Róisín Ní Ríain (IRL)	Carlotta Gilli (ITA)	Marian Polo López (ESP)
100 metre	S14	Valeriia Shabalina (NPA)	Megan Neave (GBR)	Assya Maurin-Espiau (FRA)

==== Breaststroke ====
Event		Gold	Silver	Bronze
50 metre	SB2	Diana Koltsova (NPA)	Veronika Guirenko (ISR)	Tanja Scholz (GER)
50 metre	SB3	Monica Boggioni (ITA)	Marta Fernández Infante (ESP)	Maryna Verbova (UKR)
100 metre	SB4	Giulia Ghiretti (ITA)	Fanni Illés (HUN)	Natalia Pavliukova (NPA)
100 metre	SB5	Grace Harvey (GBR)	Arianna Talamona (ITA)	Verena Schott (GER)
100 metre	SB6	Maisie Summers-Newton (GBR)	Evelin Száraz (HUN)	Nicole Turner (IRL)
100 metre	SB7	Iona Winnifrith (GBR)	Mariia Pavlova (NPA)	Nahia Zudaire Borrezo (ESP)
100 metre	SB8	Anastasiya Dmytriv (ESP)	Ellen Keane (IRL)	Viktoriia Ishchiulova (NPA)
100 metre	SB9	Chantalle Zijderveld (NED)	Lisa Kruger (NED)	Tatyana Lebrun (BEL)
100 metre	SB11	Daria Lukianenko (NPA)	Karolina Pelendritou (CYP)	Martina Rabbolini (ITA)
100 metre	SB12	Elena Krawzow (GER)	Alessia Berra (ITA)	Karina Petrikovičová (SVK)
100 metre	SB13	Róisín Ní Ríain (IRL)	Marian Polo López (ESP)	Mariia Latritskaia (NPA)
100 metre	SB14	Assya Maurin-Espiau (FRA)	Janina Falk (AUT)	Giorgia Marchi (ITA)

==== Butterfly ====
Event		Gold	Silver	Bronze
50 metre	S5	Sevilay Öztürk (TUR)	Giulia Ghiretti (ITA)	Sümeyye Boyacı (TUR)
50 metre	S6	Verena Schott (GER)	Nicole Turner (IRL)	Maisie Summers-Newton (GBR)
50 metre	S7	Ani Palian (NPA)	Veronika Korzhova (UKR)	Iona Winnifrith (GBR)
100 metre	S9	Zsófia Konkoly (HUN)	Florianne Bultje (NED)	Sarai Gascón Moreno (ESP)
100 metre	S10	Callie-Ann Warrington (GBR)	Lisa Kruger (NED)	Alessia Scortechini (ITA)
100 metre	S13	Carlotta Gilli (ITA)	Róisín Ní Ríain (IRL)	Alessia Berra (ITA)
100 metre	S14	Olivia Newman-Baronius (GBR)	Valeriia Shabalina (NPA)	Janina Falk (AUT)

==== Individual medley ====
Event		Gold	Silver	Bronze
150 metre	SM4	Gina Böttcher (GER)	Nataliia Butkova (NPA)	Maryna Verbova (UKR)
200 metre	SM5	Monica Boggioni (ITA)	Giulia Ghiretti (ITA)	Sevilay Öztürk (TUR)
200 metre	SM6	Maisie Summers-Newton (GBR)	Verena Schott (GER)	Nicole Turner (IRL)
200 metre	SM7	Iona Winnifrith (GBR)	Veronika Korzhova (UKR)	Charlotte Kast (GER)
200 metre	SM8	Viktoriia Ishchiulova (NPA)	Xenia Palazzo (ITA)	Mariia Pavlova (NPA)
200 metre	SM9	Núria Marquès (ESP)	Zsófia Konkoly (HUN)	Sarai Gascón Moreno (ESP)
200 metre	SM10	Lisa Kruger (NED)	Tatyana Lebrun (BEL)	Bianka Pap (HUN)
200 metre	SM11	Daria Lukianenko (NPA)	Liesette Bruinsma (NED)	Eliza Humphrey (GBR)
200 metre	SM13	Carlotta Gilli (ITA)	Róisín Ní Ríain (IRL)	Marian Polo López (ESP)
200 metre	SM14	Olivia Newman-Baronius (GBR)	Valeriia Shabalina (NPA)	Assya Maurin-Espiau (FRA)

=== Mixed ===
==== Freestyle ====
Event		Gold	Silver	Bronze
4 × 50 metre	20 pts	Spain; Luis Huerta Poza; Leyre Ortí Campos; Marta Fernández Infante; Antoni Ponce Bertran	Italy; Francesco Bocciardo; Monica Boggioni; Arianna Talamona; Federico Cristiani	Ukraine; Denys Ostapchenko; Veronika Korzhova; Oleksandr Komarov; Iryna Poida
4 × 100 metre	34 pts	Italy; Alessia Scortechini; Xenia Palazzo; Federico Bicelli; Simone Barlaam	France; Laurent Chardard; Agathe Pauli; Émeline Pierre; Ugo Didier	Spain; Iñigo Llopis Sanz; Ariel Schrenck Martínez; Sarai Gascón Moreno; Nahia Zudaire Borrezo

==== Medley ====
Event		Gold	Silver	Bronze
4 × 50 metre	20 pts	Spain; Antoni Ponce Bertran; Miguel Luque Ávila; Marta Fernández Infante; Sarai Gascón Moreno	Ukraine; Denys Ostapchenko; Danylo Semenykhin; Veronika Korzhova; Iryna Poida	Italy; Vincenzo Boni; Monica Boggioni; Alberto Amodeo; Arianna Talamona
4 × 100 metre	34 pts	Netherlands; Olivier van de Voort; Chantalle Zijderveld; Florianne Bultje; Thijs van Hofweegen	Italy; Federico Bicelli; Stefano Raimondi; Alessia Scortechini; Xenia Palazzo	Spain; Iñigo Llopis Sanz; Anastasiya Dmytriv; José Antonio Mari; Sarai Gascón Moreno

== Participants ==
=== European ===
1. Austria (3)
2. Azerbaijan (3)
3. Belgium (4)
4. Bosnia and Herzegovina (2)
5. Croatia (4)
6. Cyprus (1)
7. Czech Republic (8)
8. Denmark (1)
9. Estonia (3)
10. Finland (2)
11. France (18)
12. Germany (16)
13. United Kingdom (16)
14. Greece (10)
15. Hungary (9)
16. Iceland (4)
17. Ireland (6)
18. Israel (7)
19. Italy (33)
20. Latvia (1)
21. Lithuania (4)
22. Malta (1)
23. Netherlands (11)
24. NPA (58)
25. Norway (3)
26. Poland (11)
27. Portugal (7)
28. Moldova (2)
29. Serbia (1)
30. Slovakia (3)
31. Spain (41)
32. Sweden (5)
33. Switzerland (2)
34. Turkey (7)
35. Ukraine (45)

=== Open ===
1. Afghanistan (1)
2. Australia (20)
3. Brazil (7)
4. Canada (5)
5. China (5)
6. Costa Rica (1)
7. Egypt (3)
8. Malaysia (3)
9. Mexico (4)
10. Namibia (1)
11. Singapore (4)
12. South Africa (6)
13. United States (3)
14. Uzbekistan (8)
15. Venezuela (2)
