= Swimming at the 2022 Commonwealth Games – Men's 50 metre freestyle S7 =

Men's 50 metre freestyle S7 at the 2022 Commonwealth Games
- Venue: Sandwell Aquatics Centre
- Dates: 1 August
- Competitors: 8 from 5 nations
- Winning time: 28.95

Medalists
gold medal	Matt Levy	Australia
silver medal	Toh Wei Soong	Singapore
bronze medal	Christian Sadie	South Africa

The men's 50 metre freestyle S7 event at the 2022 Commonwealth Games was held on 1 August at the Sandwell Aquatics Centre.

== Results ==
=== Final ===
Rank	Lane	Name	Nationality	Time	Notes
1st place, gold medalist(s)	4	Matt Levy	Australia	28.95	
2nd place, silver medalist(s)	5	Toh Wei Soong	Singapore	29.10	
3rd place, bronze medalist(s)	3	Christian Sadie	South Africa	29.78	
4	6	Michael Jones	England	30.95	
5	2	Suyash Jadhav	India	31.30	
6	7	Joel Mundie	Australia	32.13	
7	1	Niranjan Mukundan	India	32.55	
8	8	William Perry	England	33.18	
