= Carlos Serrano Zárate =

Colombian Paralympic swimmer

Personal information
- Born: 17 August 1998 (age 27) Bucaramanga, Colombia

Sport
- Country: Colombia
- Sport: Para swimming
- Disability: Short stature
- Disability class: S7, SB7, SM7; SB8
Medal record
Representing Colombia
Men's para swimming
Event	1st	2nd	3rd
Paralympic Games	2	4	4
World Championships	13	7	4
Parapan American Games	14	3	3
South American Para Games	1	1	0
Total	30	15	11
Paralympic Games
Gold medal – first place	2016 Rio de Janeiro	100 m breaststroke SB7
Gold medal – first place	2020 Tokyo	100 m breaststroke SB7
Silver medal – second place	2016 Rio de Janeiro	100 m freestyle S7
Silver medal – second place	2020 Tokyo	50 m freestyle S7
Silver medal – second place	2024 Paris	50 m freestyle S7
Silver medal – second place	2024 Paris	50 m butterfly S7
Bronze medal – third place	2016 Rio de Janeiro	50 m freestyle S7
Bronze medal – third place	2020 Tokyo	50 m butterfly S7
Bronze medal – third place	2020 Tokyo	200 m medley SM7
Bronze medal – third place	2024 Paris	100 m breaststroke SB8
World Championships
Gold medal – first place	2015 Glasgow	100 m breaststroke SB7
Gold medal – first place	2017 Mexico City	50 m freestyle S7
Gold medal – first place	2017 Mexico City	50 m butterfly S7
Gold medal – first place	2017 Mexico City	100 m freestyle S7
Gold medal – first place	2017 Mexico City	100 m breaststroke SB7
Gold medal – first place	2017 Mexico City	200 m medley SM7
Gold medal – first place	2019 London	100 m freestyle S7
Gold medal – first place	2019 London	100 m breaststroke SB7
Gold medal – first place	2019 London	200 m medley SM7
Gold medal – first place	2022 Madeira	100 m breaststroke SB7
Gold medal – first place	2022 Madeira	200 m medley SM7
Gold medal – first place	2023 Manchester	100 m breaststroke SB8
Gold medal – first place	2025 Singapore	100 m breaststroke SB7
Silver medal – second place	2022 Madeira	50 m freestyle S7
Silver medal – second place	2022 Madeira	50 m butterfly S7
Silver medal – second place	2023 Manchester	50 m freestyle S7
Silver medal – second place	2023 Manchester	50 m butterfly S7
Silver medal – second place	2023 Manchester	200 m medley SM7
Silver medal – second place	2025 Singapore	50 m freestyle S7
Silver medal – second place	2025 Singapore	50 m butterfly S7
Bronze medal – third place	2017 Mexico City	400 m freestyle S7
Bronze medal – third place	2019 London	50 m butterfly S7
Bronze medal – third place	2022 Madeira	100 m freestyle S7
Bronze medal – third place	2023 Manchester	100 m freestyle S7
Parapan American Games
Gold medal – first place	2015 Toronto	50 m freestyle S7
Gold medal – first place	2015 Toronto	50 m butterfly S7
Gold medal – first place	2015 Toronto	100 m freestyle S7
Gold medal – first place	2015 Toronto	100 m breaststroke SB7
Gold medal – first place	2015 Toronto	200 m medley SM7
Gold medal – first place	2019 Lima	50 m freestyle S7
Gold medal – first place	2019 Lima	50 m butterfly S7
Gold medal – first place	2019 Lima	100 m freestyle S7
Gold medal – first place	2019 Lima	100 m breaststroke SB7
Gold medal – first place	2019 Lima	200 m medley SM7
Gold medal – first place	2023 Santiago	50 m freestyle S7
Gold medal – first place	2023 Santiago	100 m freestyle S8
Gold medal – first place	2023 Santiago	100 m breaststroke SB8
Gold medal – first place	2023 Santiago	200 m medley SM7
Silver medal – second place	2015 Toronto	400 m freestyle S7
Silver medal – second place	2019 Lima	400 m freestyle S7
Silver medal – second place	2023 Santiago	50 m butterfly S7
Bronze medal – third place	2019 Lima	100 m backstroke S7
Bronze medal – third place	2023 Santiago	4×100 m mixed freestyle relay 34 pts
Bronze medal – third place	2023 Santiago	4×100 m mixed medley relay 34 pts
South American Para Games
Gold medal – first place	2026 Valledupar	50 m freestyle S7
Gold medal – first place	2026 Valledupar	100 m breaststroke SB7
Silver medal – second place	2026 Valledupar	400 m freestyle S6-S7

Carlos Daniel Serrano Zárate (born August 17, 1998, in Bucaramanga) is a Colombian Paralympic swimmer.

== Career ==
He competed in the 2016 Summer Paralympics and won a gold, a silver and a bronze medal. In 2018, he was nominated for the Americas Paralympic Committee Athlete of the Year prize.

Serrano won the gold medal in the men's 100 m breaststroke SB7 at the World Para Swimming Championships in Singapore.
