= 2022 World Para Swimming Championships – Men's 50 metre butterfly =

The men's 50m butterfly events at the 2022 World Para Swimming Championships were held at the Penteada Olympic Swimming Complex in Madeira between 12–18 June.

== Medalists ==
Event	Gold	Silver	Bronze
S5	Samuel da Silva de Oliveira; Brazil	Kaede Hinata; Japan	Siyazbek Daliyev; Kazakhstan
S6	Laurent Chardard; France	Nelson Crispín; Colombia	David Sanchez Sierra; Spain
S7	Andrii Trusov; Ukraine	Carlos Serrano Zárate; Colombia	Iñaki Basiloff; Argentina

== Results ==
=== S5 ===
Final

Eight swimmers from seven nations took part.

Rank	Athlete	Nation	Result	Notes
1st place, gold medalist(s)	Samuel da Silva de Oliveira	Brazil	33.23	
2nd place, silver medalist(s)	Kaede Hinata	Japan	35.06	
3rd place, bronze medalist(s)	Siyazbek Daliyev	Kazakhstan	36.32	
4	Abbas Karimi	United States	36.87	
5	Alexandros-Stylianos Lergios	Greece	38.72	
6	Tiago de Oliveira Ferreira	Brazil	39.19	
7	Miguel Ángel Rincón	Colombia	41.63	
	Koral Berkin Kutlu	Turkey	DSQ	
