= Rhys Darbey =

British Paralympic swimmer (born 2007)

Personal information
- Nationality: British
- Born: 13 June 2007 (age 19)

Sport
- Sport: Paralympic swimming
- Disability class: S14, SM14
Medal record
Men's paralympic swimming
Representing Great Britain
Paralympic Games
Gold medal – first place	2024 Paris	Mixed 4×100 m freestyle S14
Silver medal – second place	2024 Paris	200 m ind. medley SM14
World Championships
Silver medal – second place	2023 Manchester	200 m ind. medley SM14
Silver medal – second place	2025 Singapore	200 m ind. medley SM14

Rhys Darbey (born 13 June 2007) is a British Paralympic swimmer. He represented Great Britain at the 2024 Summer Paralympics.

== Career ==
Darbey represented the Great Britain at the 2024 Summer Paralympics and won a gold medal in the mixed 4 × 100 metre freestyle relay S14 event.
