= Swimming at the 2018 Commonwealth Games – Men's 50 metre freestyle S7 =

Men's 50m Freestyle S7 at the 2018 Commonwealth Games
- Venue: Gold Coast Aquatic Centre
- Dates: 9 April
- Competitors: 6 from 4 nations
- Winning time: 28.60

Medalists
gold medal	Matthew Levy	Australia
silver medal	Christian Sadie	South Africa
bronze medal	Toh Wei Soong	Singapore

The men's 50m freestyle S7 event at the 2018 Commonwealth Games was held on 9 April at the Gold Coast Aquatic Centre. This was the first time the event had been held at a Commonwealth Games. Matthew Levy of Australia won gold, swimming a time of 28.60 seconds in the final.

== Schedule ==
The schedule was as follows:

All times are Australian Eastern Standard Time (UTC+10)

Date	Time	Round
Friday 9 April 2018	11:33	Qualifying
Friday 9 April 2018	20:06	Final

== Records ==
Prior to this competition, the existing world, Commonwealth and Games records were as follows:

World record	Pan Shiyun (CHN)	27.35	Rio de Janeiro, Brazil	9 September 2016
Commonwealth record				
Games record				

== Results ==
=== Heat ===
As only 6 swimmers entered, all competitors advanced to the final.

Rank	Lane	Name	Nation	Result	Notes
1	4	Matthew Levy	Australia	28.68	Q
2	5	Christian Sadie	South Africa	29.54	Q
3	6	Toh Wei Soong	Singapore	30.35	Q
4	2	Jean-Michel Lavalliere	Canada	30.37	Q
5	7	Rohan Bright	Australia	30.86	Q
6	3	Matthew Haanappel	Australia	30.92	Q

=== Final ===
Rank	Lane	Name	Nation	Result	Notes
1st place, gold medalist(s)	4	Matthew Levy	Australia	28.60	
2nd place, silver medalist(s)	5	Christian Sadie	South Africa	29.65	
3rd place, bronze medalist(s)	3	Toh Wei Soong	Singapore	29.83	
4	6	Jean-Michel Lavalliere	Canada	30.14	
5	2	Rohan Bright	Australia	30.71	
6	7	Matthew Haanappel	Australia	30.75	
