= Matt Levy =

Australian Paralympic swimmer (born 1987)

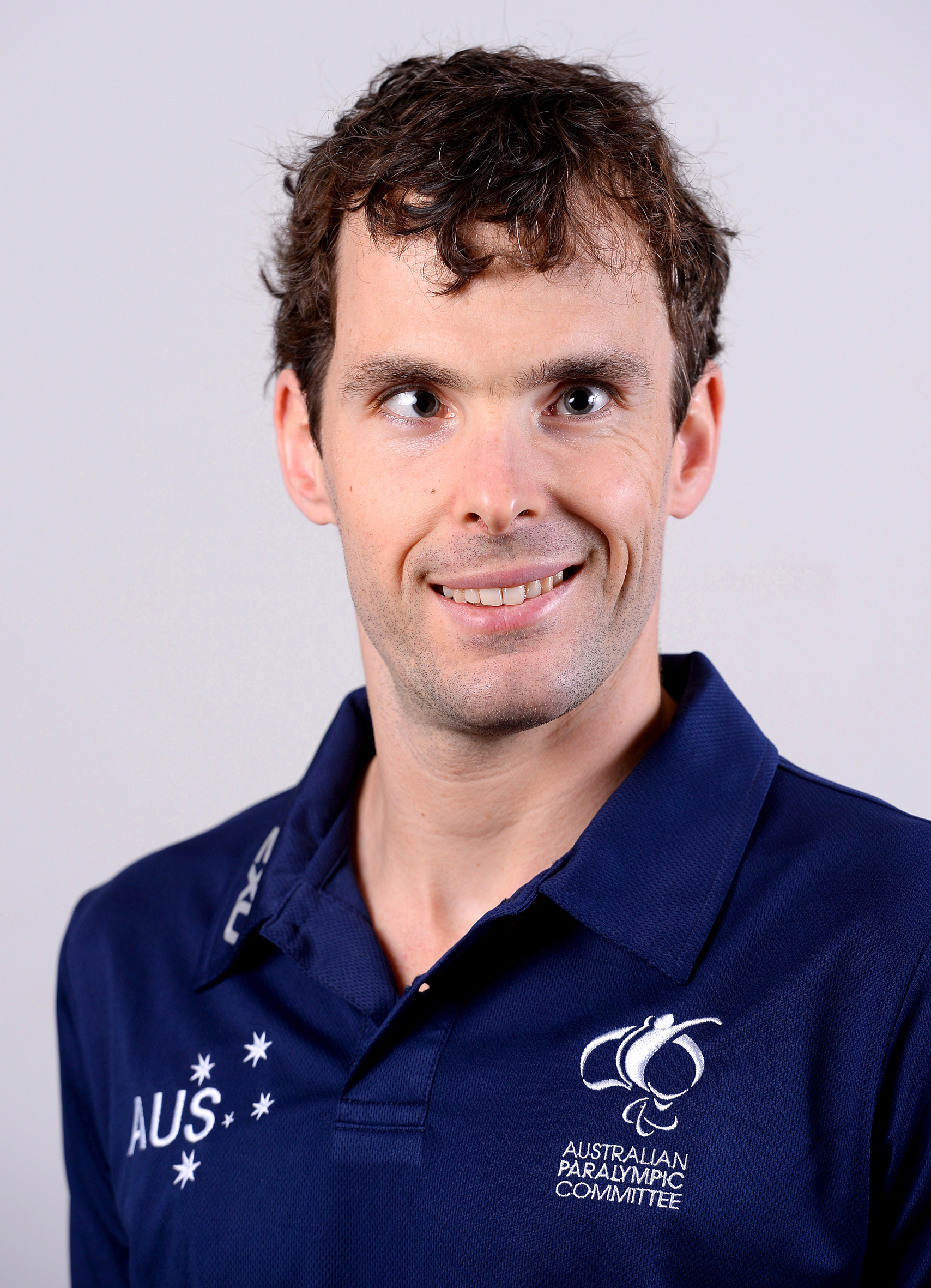
- 2016 Australian Paralympic team portrait

Personal information
- Full name: Matthew John Levy
- Nationality: Australian
- Born: 11 January 1987 (age 39) Sydney, New South Wales

Sport
- Sport: Swimming
- Strokes: Freestyle, butterfly, medley
- Classifications: S7
- Club: North Sydney Swimming Club
- Coach: Steve Badger
Medal record
Men's paralympic swimming
Representing Australia
Paralympic Games
Gold medal – first place	2008 Beijing	4×100 metre medley
Gold medal – first place	2012 London	4×100 m freestyle
Gold medal – first place	2020 Tokyo	4×100 m freestyle 34 pts
Silver medal – second place	2012 London	100 m freestyle S7
Bronze medal – third place	2012 London	100 m breaststroke SB7
Bronze medal – third place	2012 London	200 m medley SM7
Bronze medal – third place	2012 London	4×100 m medley
Bronze medal – third place	2016 Rio de Janeiro	200 m medley SM7
Bronze medal – third place	2020 Tokyo	100 m breaststroke SB6
World Championships (LC)
Gold medal – first place	2010 Eindhoven	4 × 100 m freestyle
Gold medal – first place	2013 Montreal	200 m medley SM7
Gold medal – first place	2013 Montreal	4×100 m freestyle
Gold medal – first place	2022 Madeira	Mixed 4 × 100 m medley relay 34 pts
Silver medal – second place	2010 Eindhoven	100 m freestyle S7
Silver medal – second place	2010 Eindhoven	100 m breaststroke SB7
Silver medal – second place	2013 Montreal	100 m freestyle
Silver medal – second place	2015 Glasgow	100 m Freestyle S7
Silver medal – second place	2015 Glasgow	200 m medley SM7
Bronze medal – third place	2010 Eindhoven	50 m butterfly S7
Bronze medal – third place	2010 Eindhoven	200 m medley SM7
Bronze medal – third place	2015 Glasgow	50 m freestyle S7
Bronze medal – third place	2015 Glasgow	4×100 m freestyle 34 points
Bronze medal – third place	2019 London	4x100m freestyle 34 points
Bronze medal – third place	2022 Madeira	100 m breaststroke SB6
Commonwealth Games
Gold medal – first place	2018 Gold Coast	50 m freestyle S7
Gold medal – first place	2022 Birmingham	50 m freestyle S7

Matthew John Levy, OAM (born 11 January 1987) is a retired Australian Paralympic swimmer. At five Paralympic Games from 2004 to 2020, he has won three gold, one silver and six bronze medals.

== Personal ==
Levy has cerebral palsy and a vision impairment due to being born 15 weeks premature. He attended St Andrew's Cathedral School in Sydney. He works at Deloitte, is on the board of directors of the New South Wales disability organisation Ability Options, and lives in Sydney.

He completed a Bachelor of Business at Swinburne University of Technology in 2015 and a Master of Business Administration at the University of Canberra in 2021. In 2020, he released a memoir/self-help book, Keeping Your Head Above Water: Inspirational Insights From a Champion.

== Competitive career ==
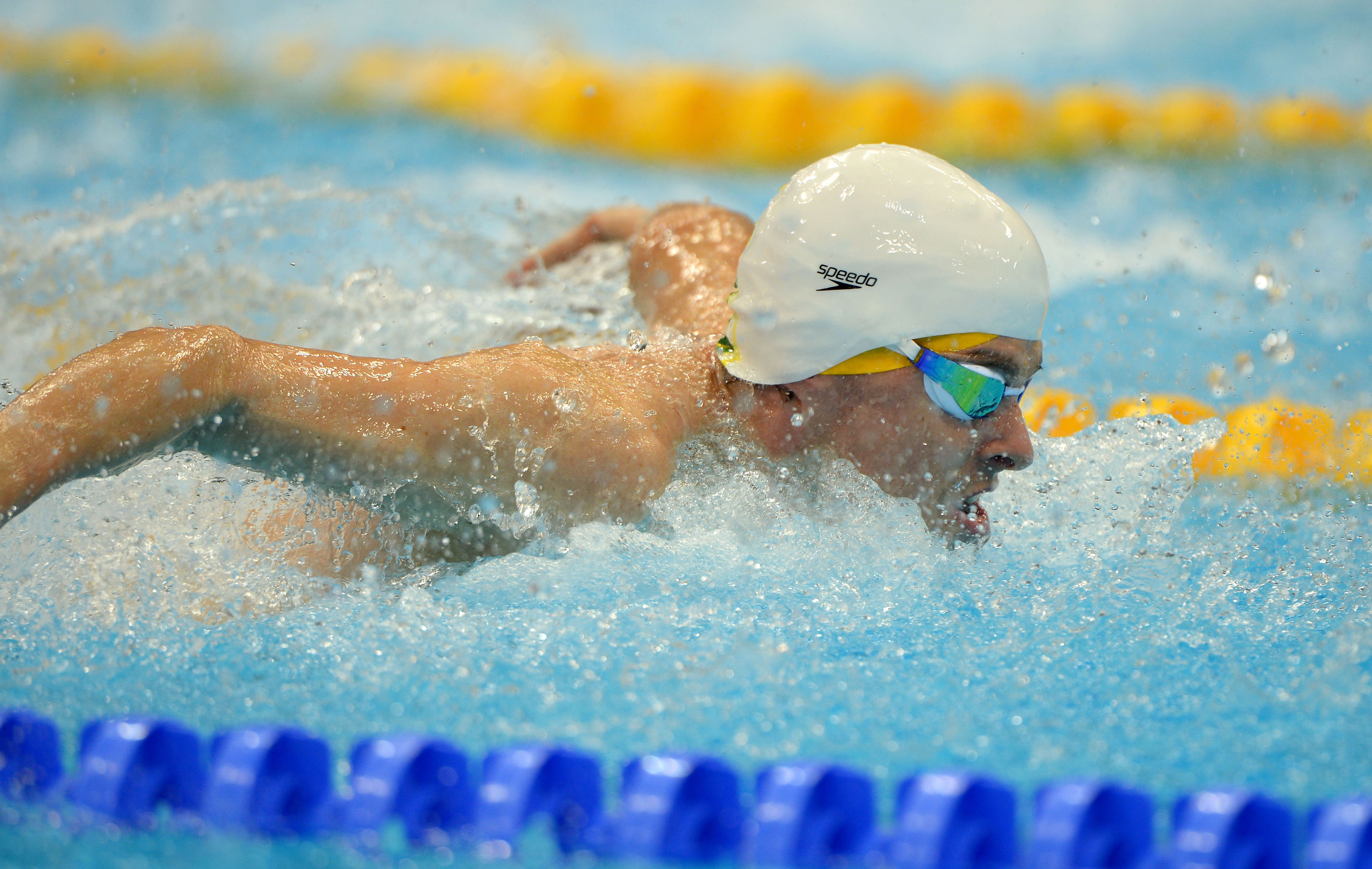
Levy at the 2012 Summer Paralympics

Levy is classified as an S7 swimmer. Levy first competed for Australia in 2003; that year, he broke the 200 m freestyle short course world record. He competed but did not win any medals at the 2004 Athens Games. He competed at the 2006 IPC Swimming World Championships and won four silver and four bronze medals at the 2007 Telstra Short Course Championships. At the 2008 Beijing Games, he won a gold medal in the 4×100 m medley relay 34 pts event. At the 2010 IPC Swimming World Championships, he won a gold medal in the 4×100 m freestyle relay event, two silver medals in the 100 m breaststroke and 100 m freestyle events, and two bronze medals in the 50 m butterfly and 200 m individual medley events.

At the 2012 London Paralympics he won five medals: a gold medal in the 4×100 m freestyle relay, a silver medal in the 100 m freestyle S7, and three bronze medals in the 200 m individual medley SM7, 100 m breaststroke SB7 and 4×100 m medley relay. He also participated in the 400 m freestyle S7, 50 m butterfly S7 and 50 m freestyle S7 events.

Competing at the 2013 IPC Swimming World Championships in Montreal, he won two gold medals in the 200 m individual medley S7 and 4×100 m freestyle relay and a silver medal in the 100 m freestyle S7.

At the 2015 IPC Swimming World Championships, he won silver medals in the Men's 100 m freestyle S7 and 200 m medley SM7 and bronze medals in the Men's 50 m freestyle S7 and Men's 4×100 m freestyle relay 34 points. He finished fourth in the men's 100 m breaststroke SB7, men's 50 m butterfly S7 and men's 4 × 100 m medley relay 34pts.

At the 2016 Rio Paralympics, he won the bronze medal in the Men's 200 m Individual Medley SM7. He placed fourth in the Men's 50 m Freestyle S7 and Men's 100 m Freestyle S7, fifth in the Men's 50 m Butterfly S7, fourth in the Men's 4×100 m Medley Relay (34 points) and fifth in the Men's 4×100 m Freestyle (34 Points).

At the 2018 Commonwealth Games on the Gold Coast, Australia, he won gold in the Men's 50m Freestyle (S7).

At the 2019 World Para Swimming Championships in London, he came third (winning the bronze medal) in the Men's 4 × 100 m Freestyle (34 points), came fourth in the Men's 4 × 100 m Medley (34 points), fifth in the Men's 200m Individual Medley (SM7) and Men's 100m Freestyle (S7), sixth in the Men's 400m Freestyle (S7) and seventh in the Men's 100m Breaststroke (SB6) (Oceania Record).

As of 2015, he is a New South Wales Institute of Sport scholarship holder.

At the 2020 Tokyo Paralympics, Levy won gold in the Men's 4 × 100 m freestyle 34 pts, along with Rowan Crothers, William Martin and Ben Popham, breaking the current World Record by almost 2 seconds. He also won a bronze medal in the Men's 100 m breaststroke SB6.

Levy won two medals – gold in the Mixed 4 × 100 m medley relay 34 pts and bronze in the Men's 50 m Freestyle S7 at the 2022 World Para Swimming Championships, Madeira.

He competed at the 2022 Birmingham Commonwealth Games, where he won the gold medal in the Men's 50 m Freestyle S7. He announced his retirement from swimming at the games.

== Recognition ==
Levy was awarded a Medal of the Order of Australia in the 2014 Australia Day Honours "for service to sport as a Gold Medallist at the London 2012 Paralympic Games." In 2015, he was named Athlete of the Year with a Disability at the New South Wales Sport Awards. In October 2018, he was named Swimming Australia's Paralympic Program Swimmer of the Year. In November 2021, he received a New South Wales Institute of Sport Academic Excellence Award. He was named the 2021 Sport NSW Athlete of the Year with a Disability. In November 2023, Levy was inducted into the University of Canberra Sports Walk of Fame.

== Bibliography ==
- Wake, Rebekka (September 2010). "Golden Glow Over Australian Swimming". Australian Paralympian. 2. Australia: Australian Paralympic Committee.
