= Jean-Jacques Terblanche =

South African Paralympic swimmer

Medal record

Swimming

Representing South Africa

Paralympic Games
Gold medal – first place	1996 Atlanta	200m individual medley - SM8
Bronze medal – third place	1996 Atlanta	100 metre butterfly - S8

Jean-Jacques Terblanche (born c. 1980) is a former paralympic swimmer from South Africa who competed mainly in category S8 events.

== Sporting career ==
Terblanche won a gold medal at the 1994 IPC Swimming World Championships in Malta, at the age of 14.

Terblanche competed in the 1996 Summer Paralympics in Atlanta winning a gold and bronze medal. He won the gold in the 200m medley in a new world record time and won the bronze in the 100m butterfly. He also competed in the 50m freestyle, finishing eleventh overall in the heats and was disqualified in the 100m breaststroke.

== Personal life ==
Terblanche injured his neck and lost the use of his left arm after a car accident when he was two years old. He attended Afrikaanse Hoër Seunskool in Pretoria.
