= Jesús Alberto Gutiérrez Bermúdez =

Mexican Paralympic swimmer (born 2006)

Jesús Alberto Gutiérrez
Personal information
- Full name: Jesús Alberto Gutiérrez Bermúdez
- Born: 17 November 2006 (age 19)

Sport
- Country: Mexico
- Sport: Paralympic swimming
- Disability class: S6, SM6
Medal record
Men's paralympic swimming
Representing Mexico
Paralympic Games
Bronze medal – third place	2024 Paris	400 m freestyle S6
World Championships
Silver medal – second place	2023 Manchester	200 m ind. medley SM6
Silver medal – second place	2025 Singapore	200 m ind. medley SM6
Bronze medal – third place	2025 Singapore	100 m breaststroke SB6
Parapan American Games
Silver medal – second place	2023 Santiago	50 m butterfly S6
Bronze medal – third place	2023 Santiago	400 m freestyle S6
Bronze medal – third place	2023 Santiago	200 m ind. medley SM6

Jesús Alberto Gutiérrez Bermúdez (Note: In this Spanish name, the first or paternal surname is Gutiérrez and the second or maternal family name is Bermúdez.) (born 17 November 2006) is a Mexican Paralympic swimmer. He represented Mexico at the 2024 Summer Paralympics.

== Career ==
Gutiérrez competed at the 2023 World Para Swimming Championships and won a silver medal in the 200 metre individual medley SM6 event.

Gutiérrez represented Mexico at the 2024 Summer Paralympics and won a bronze medal in the 400 m freestyle S6 event.

== Personal life ==
His brothers, Juan José and Raúl, are both Paralympic swimmers and competed at the 2020 Summer Paralympics.
