= Egor Efrosinin =

Russian Paralympic swimmer (born 1998)

Personal information
- Nationality: Russian
- Born: 17 June 1998 (age 28) Biysk, Russia

Sport
- Sport: Paralympic swimming
- Disability class: S7, SB7, SM7
Medal record
Paralympic swimming
Representing Russia
World Championships
Silver medal – second place	2019 London	100 m breaststroke SB7
European Championships
Gold medal – first place	2016 Funchal	100 m breaststroke SB7
Silver medal – second place	2016 Funchal	50 m butterfly S7
Bronze medal – third place	2026 Kocaeli	100 m breaststroke SB7
Representing RPC
Paralympic Games
Silver medal – second place	2020 Tokyo	100 m breaststroke SB7
Representing Neutral Paralympic Athletes
Paralympic Games
Bronze medal – third place	2024 Paris	50 m freestyle S7
Bronze medal – third place	2024 Paris	50 m butterfly S7
World Championships
Silver medal – second place	2025 Singapore	100 m breaststroke SB7
Bronze medal – third place	2025 Singapore	50 m freestyle S7
European Championships
Bronze medal – third place	2024 Funchal	200 m ind. medley SM7

Egor Efrosinin (born 17 June 1998) is a Russian Paralympic swimmer. He represented Russian Paralympic Committee athletes at the 2020 Summer Paralympics.

== Career ==
Efrosinin represented the Russian Paralympic Committee athletes at the 2020 Summer Paralympics in the men's 100 metre breaststroke SB7 event and won a silver medal.
