= Laurent Chardard =

French Paralympic swimmer

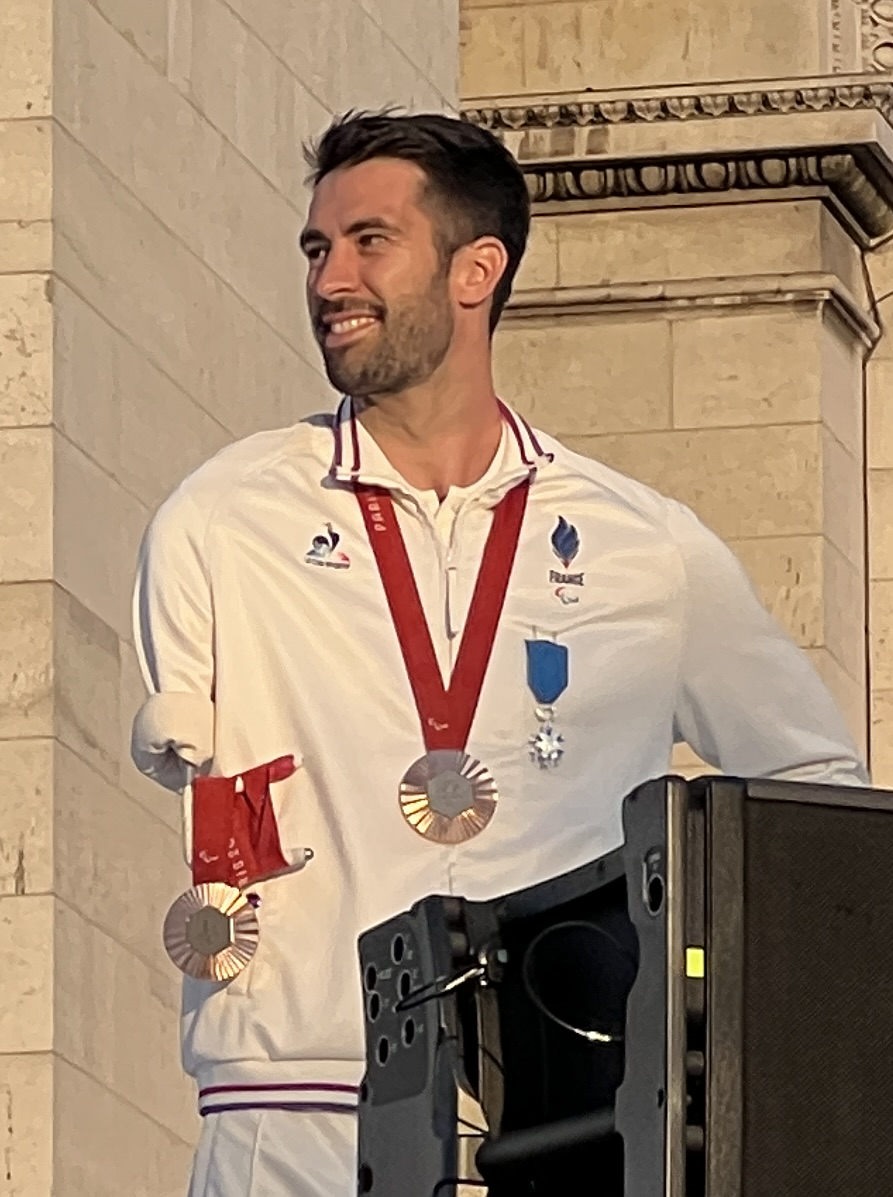
- Chardard in 2024

Personal information
- Born: 30 August 1995 (age 31) Saint-Pierre, Réunion, France

Sport
- Country: France
- Sport: Paralympic swimming
- Disability class: S6
Medal record
Paralympic swimming
Representing France
Paralympic Games
Bronze medal – third place	2024 Paris	100 m freestyle S6
Bronze medal – third place	2024 Paris	50 m butterfly S6
World Championships
Gold medal – first place	2022 Madeira	50m butterfly S6
Gold medal – first place	2023 Manchester	50m butterfly S6
Silver medal – second place	2019 London	50m butterfly S6
Silver medal – second place	2025 Singapore	50m butterfly S6
Bronze medal – third place	2019 London	50m freestyle S6
Bronze medal – third place	2023 Manchester	50m freestyle S6
Bronze medal – third place	2025 Singapore	Mixed 4×100 m freestyle relay 34 pts
European Championships
Gold medal – first place	2021 Funchal	100m backstroke S6
Silver medal – second place	2021 Funchal	50m butterfly S6
Silver medal – second place	2026 Kocaeli	100 m backstroke S6
Bronze medal – third place	2026 Kocaeli	100 m freestyle S6

Laurent Chardard (born 30 August 1995) is a French Paralympic swimmer who competes in international elite events. He is a European gold medalist and a World gold medalist.

== Personal life ==
Chardard lost his right arm and leg from a shark attack while bodyboarding at a beach near his hometown.
