= Yurii Shenhur =

Ukrainian Paralympic swimmer

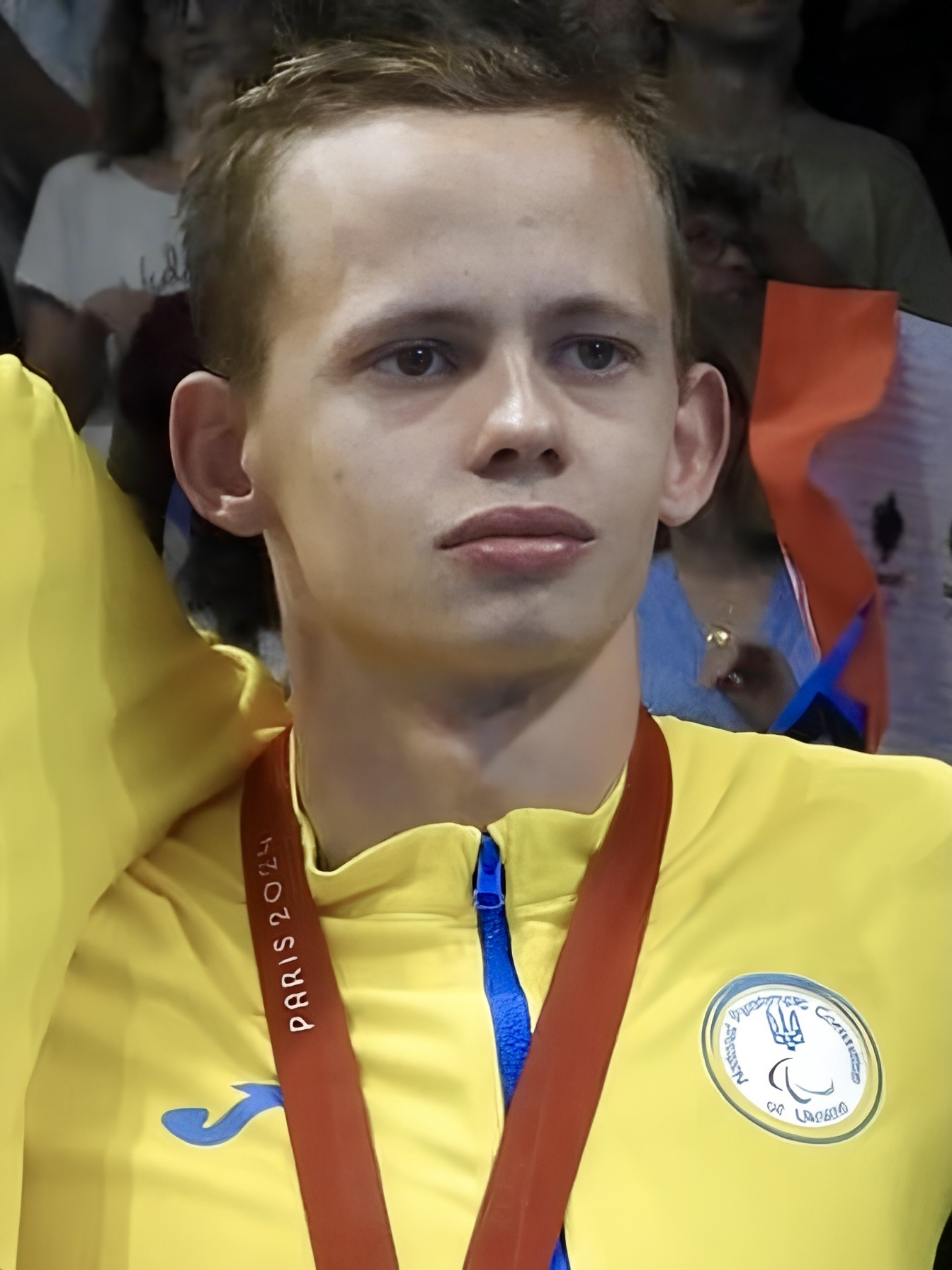
- Shenhur at the 2024 Summer Paralympics

Personal information
- Born: 26 June 2003 (age 23)
- Home town: Poltava, Ukraine

Sport
- Country: Ukraine
- Sport: Paralympic swimming
- Disability class: S7
Medal record
Men's para swimming
Representing Ukraine
Paralympic Games
Gold medal – first place	2024 Paris	100 m backstroke S7
World Championships
Silver medal – second place	2023 Manchester	100 m backstroke S7
Bronze medal – third place	2023 Manchester	50 m freestyle S7
European Championships
Bronze medal – third place	2024 Madeira	100 m backstroke S7
Bronze medal – third place	2024 Madeira	50 m freestyle S7

Yurii Shenhur (Ukrainian: Юрій Шенгур; born 26 June 2003) is a Ukrainian Paralympic swimmer. He represented Ukraine at the 2024 Summer Paralympics.

== Career ==
Shenhur represented Ukraine at the 2024 Summer Paralympics and won a gold medal in the 100 metre backstroke S7 event.
