= Evan Austin =

American paralympic swimmer

Personal information
- Nationality: American
- Born: September 10, 1992 (age 33) Terre Haute, Indiana, U.S.

Sport
- Sport: Paralympic swimming
- Disability class: S7
Medal record
Men's paralympic swimming
Representing the United States
Paralympic Games
Gold medal – first place	2020 Tokyo	50 m butterfly S7
Bronze medal – third place	2020 Tokyo	400 m freestyle S7
Parapan American Games
Gold medal – first place	2023 Santiago	50 m butterfly S7

Evan Austin (born September 10, 1992) is an American Paralympic swimmer. He represented the United States at the Summer Paralympic Games.

== Career ==
Austin competed in the 400 metre freestyle S7 event at the 2020 Summer Paralympics and won a bronze medal. He also competed in the 50 metre butterfly S7 event and won a gold medal.
