= Iñaki Basiloff =

Argentine Paralympic swimmer

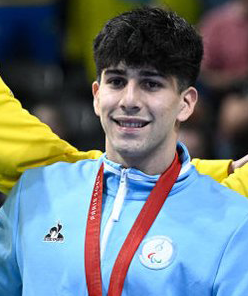
- Basiloff at the 2024 Summer Paralympics

Personal information
- Born: 28 April 2001 (age 25) Neuquén, Argentina

Sport
- Country: Argentina
- Sport: Paralympic swimming
- Disability: Transverse myelitis
- Disability class: S7
Medal record
Paralympic swimming
Representing Argentina
Paralympic Games
Gold medal – first place	2024 Paris	200 m ind. medley SM7
Bronze medal – third place	2024 Paris	400 m freestyle S7
World Championships
Gold medal – first place	2022 Madeira	400m freestyle S7
Gold medal – first place	2025 Singapore	200m ind. medley SM7
Silver medal – second place	2022 Madeira	200m ind. medley SM7
Silver medal – second place	2023 Manchester	400 m freestyle S7
Silver medal – second place	2025 Singapore	400 m freestyle S7
Bronze medal – third place	2017 Mexico City	400m freestyle S8
Bronze medal – third place	2017 Mexico City	4x100m freestyle relay 34pts
Bronze medal – third place	2019 London	400m freestyle S7
Bronze medal – third place	2022 Madeira	100m backstroke S7
Bronze medal – third place	2022 Madeira	50m butterfly S7
Bronze medal – third place	2023 Manchester	200m ind. medley SM7
Parapan American Games
Gold medal – first place	2019 Lima	400m freestyle S7
Gold medal – first place	2023 Santiago	400m freestyle S7
Silver medal – second place	2019 Lima	50m freestyle S7
Silver medal – second place	2019 Lima	50m butterfly S7
Silver medal – second place	2019 Lima	100m freestyle S7
Silver medal – second place	2019 Lima	200m ind. medley SM7
Silver medal – second place	2019 Lima	4x100m freestyle relay 34pts
Silver medal – second place	2019 Lima	4x100m medley relay 34pts

Iñaki Basiloff (born 28 April 2001) is an Argentine Paralympic swimmer who competes in international swimming competitions. He specializes in freestyle swimming.

== Career ==
He has won one gold and six silver medals at the 2019 Parapan American Games and is a three-time World bronze medalist. He also holds the world record in the 200m freestyle S7 which he achieved in March 2022.

Basiloff competed at the 2020 Summer Paralympics where he narrowly missed winning two bronze medals in the 200m individual medley SM7 and his favored event 400m freestyle S7.
