= Christian Sadie =

New Zealand para swimmer (born 1997)

Personal information
- Born: 28 October 1997 (age 28)

Sport
- Sport: Para swimming
- Disability: Radial dysplasia
- Disability class: S7, SB7, SM7
Medal record
Men's para swimming
Representing South Africa
World Championships
Silver medal – second place	2017 Mexico City	50 m freestyle S7
Silver medal – second place	2022 Madeira	100 m breaststroke SB7
Silver medal – second place	2025 Singapore	200 m medley SM7
Bronze medal – third place	2025 Singapore	100 m backstroke S7
Bronze medal – third place	2025 Singapore	50 m butterfly S7
Commonwealth Games
Gold medal – first place	2026 Glasgow	50 m freestyle S7
Silver medal – second place	2018 Gold Coast	50 m freestyle S7
Bronze medal – third place	2022 Birmingham	50 m freestyle S7

Christian Sadie (born 28 October 1997) is a South African para swimmer. He represented South Africa at the 2020 and 2024 Summer Paralympics.

== Career ==
Sadie competed at the 2018 Commonwealth Games and won a silver medal in the 50 metre freestyle S7 event. In June 2022, he competed at the 2022 World Para Swimming Championships, and won a silver medal in the 100 metre breaststroke SB7 event. He then competed at the 2022 Commonwealth Games and served as the flag bearer for South Africa during the opening ceremony. During the Commonwealth Games he won a bronze medal in the 50 metre freestyle S7 event.

He represented South Africa at the 2024 Summer Paralympics and set three African records. In September 2025, he competed at the 2025 World Para Swimming Championships and won a silver medal in the 200 metre individual medley SM7 event. In July 2026, he competed at the 2026 Commonwealth Games, where he won a gold medal in the 50 metre freestyle S7 event, setting a new Commonwealth Games record.

== Personal life ==
Sadie was born with radial dysplasia.
