= World Para Swimming European Championships =

Swimming competition

- Sport: Swimming
- Founded: 2009
- Continent: European (IPC)

The World Para Swimming European Championships (World Para Swimming European Open Championships), known until 2018 as the IPC Swimming European Championships, are the European continental championships for swimming where athletes with a disability compete. Each championship is organised by the International Paralympic Committee (IPC) and behind the World Para Swimming Championships and the Summer Paralympic Games is the largest meet for European athletes. Beginning in 2009 before switching to even numbered years in 2014, the championships are generally biennial, although no championships were held in 2022.

== Format - European Open Championships ==
Since 2020, non-Europeans have been allowed to compete, increasingly the depth and quality of the fields, and in this behalf the Championships are also called the World Para Swimming European Open Championships.

Under this format, the European swimmers are competing simultaneously for continental medals and 'open championship' medals, whereas the guest non-Europeans are only eligible for 'open championship' medals, and are ignored for the purposes of the European Championship medals.

At the single combined medal ceremony, any European swimmer is awarded the greater of their two possible medals which is always the European Championship medal for that race. A non-European swimmer will be awarded a 'commemorative medal' of the rank they finished in the Open championship race, normally identical to the European Championship medal but with a modified edge colour. In this manner, a non-European finishing second in the final, and a European finishing third overall in the same final, but second European, will both be awarded a silver medal, in the Open championship and the European Championship respectively.

== European championships ==
Number	Edition	Venue	Dates	Best nation
IPC Swimming European Championships
1	2009	Reykjavík, Iceland	18–24 October	(United Kingdom) Great Britain and Northern Ireland
2	2011	Berlin, Germany	3–9 July	Ukraine
3	2014	Eindhoven, Netherlands	4–10 August	Ukraine
4	2016	Funchal, Portugal	30 April – 7 May	Ukraine
World Para Swimming European Championships
5	2018	(Republic of Ireland) Dublin, Ireland	13–19 August	Ukraine
6	2020	Funchal, Portugal	16–22 May	Italy
-	2022	not held		
7	2024	Funchal, Portugal	21–27 April	Italy
8	2026	(Turkey) Kocaeli, Turkiye	7–12 September	Russia

== Medals (2009-2024) ==
Rank	Nation	Gold	Silver	Bronze	Total
1	Ukraine	239	217	181	637
2	Great Britain	156	126	107	389
3	Russia	131	132	120	383
4	Italy	115	87	81	283
5	Spain	105	109	118	332
6	Netherlands	59	40	38	137
7	Germany	37	59	63	159
8	Belarus	32	13	21	66
9	France	29	37	45	111
10	Individual Neutral Athletes	25	18	32	75
11	Hungary	22	24	38	84
12	Israel	21	19	22	62
13	Sweden	18	16	20	54
14	Poland	15	40	32	87
15	Norway	15	13	13	41
16	Greece	14	26	31	71
17	Czech Republic	11	15	12	38
18	Croatia	7	12	6	25
19	Switzerland	7	6	8	21
20	Azerbaijan	6	6	7	19
21	Brazil	6	1	2	9
22	Denmark	5	6	14	25
23	Ireland	4	12	13	29
24	Turkey	4	9	13	26
25	Australia	4	2	7	13
26	Estonia	3	4	3	10
27	Cyprus	3	3	1	7
28	Lithuania	3	1	3	7
29	Chile	2	2	0	4
30	Singapore	2	0	0	2
31	Portugal	1	10	15	26
32	Iceland	1	4	2	7
33	Belgium	1	2	6	9
34	Slovenia	1	2	2	5
35	United States	1	2	1	4
36	Latvia	1	0	1	2
37	Bosnia and Herzegovina	1	0	0	1
37	Kazakhstan	1	0	0	1
37	Mexico	1	0	0	1
40	Austria	0	7	10	17
41	Slovakia	0	3	6	9
42	Finland	0	2	2	4
43	Hong Kong	0	2	1	3
43	Uzbekistan	0	2	1	3
45	China	0	2	0	2
46	South Africa	0	1	3	4
47	Cuba	0	1	1	2
48	Argentina	0	1	0	1
49	Faroe Islands	0	0	2	2
Totals (49 entries)		1,109	1,096	1,104	3,309

2009 medal table 2011 medal table 2014 medal table 2016 medal table 2018 medal table 2020 medal table 2024 medal table

- Hong Kong was guest in 2009.
- Argentina, Brazil, Chile, Cuba and Kazakhstan were guests in 2021.
- Australia, Brazil, China, Mexico, Singapore, South Africa, United States and Uzbekistan were guests in 2024.

== See also ==
- World Para Swimming Championships
- Swimming at the Summer Paralympics
- List of IPC world records in swimming
