= S7 (classification) =

Para-swimming classification

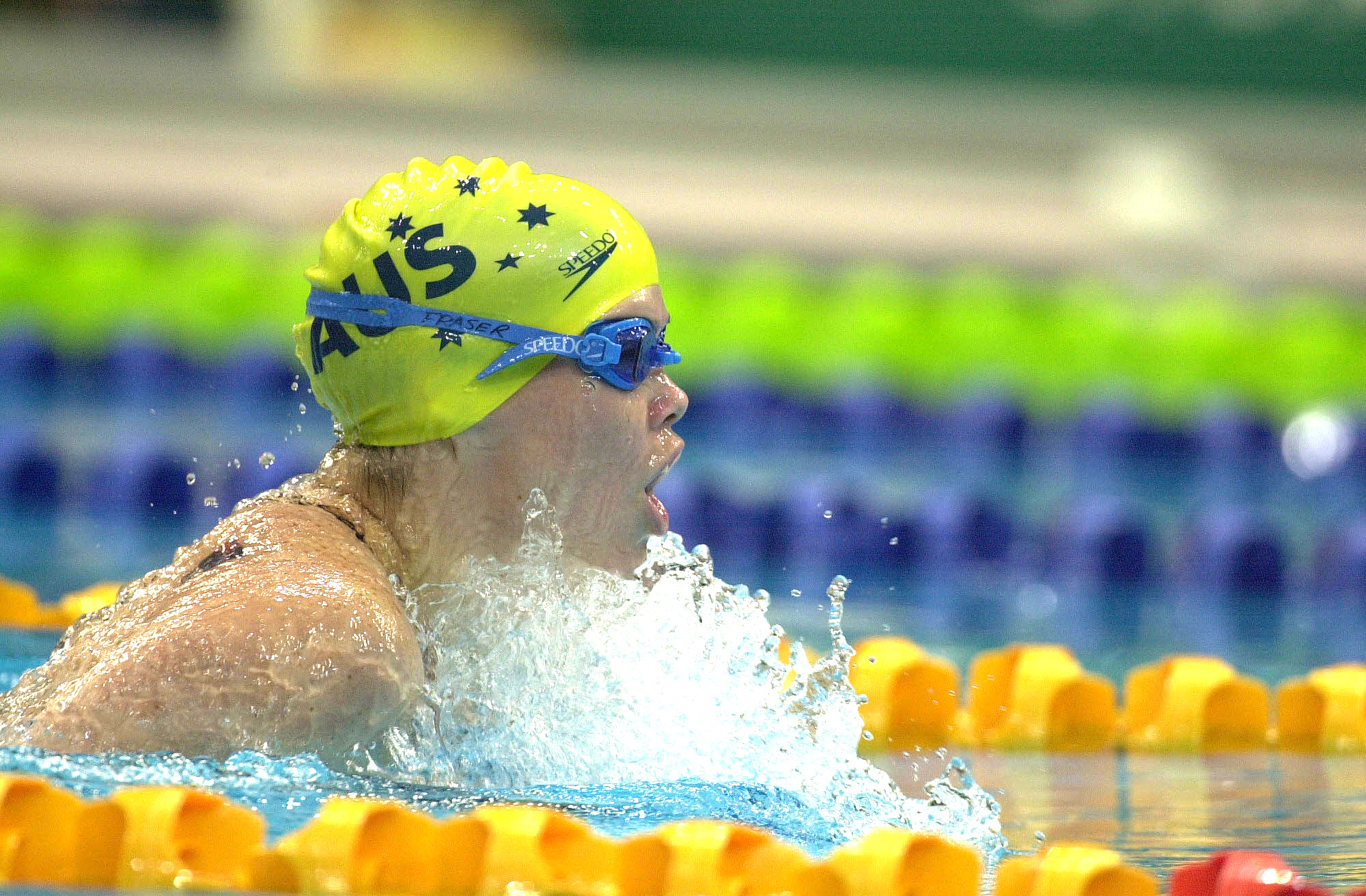
Amanda Fraser is an S7 classified swimmer

S7, SB6, SM7 are Para swimming classifications used for categorizing swimmers based on their level of disability. Swimmers in this class have use of their arms and trunk. They have limited leg function or are missing a leg or parts of both legs. This class includes a number of different disabilities including people with amputations and cerebral palsy. The classification is governed by the International Paralympic Committee, and competes at the Paralympic Games.

== Classification definition ==
This classification is for swimming. In the classification title, S represents Freestyle, Backstroke and Butterfly strokes. SB means breaststroke. SM means individual medley. Swimming classifications are on a gradient, with one being the most severely physically impaired to ten having the least amount of physical disability. Jane Buckley, writing for the Sporting Wheelies, describes the swimmers in this classification as having: "full use of their arms and trunk with some leg function; Coordination or weakness problems on the same side of the body; Limb loss of 2 limbs."

== Disability types ==
This class includes people with several disability types include cerebral palsy and amputations.

=== Amputee ===
ISOD amputee A2, A3, A5, A6 and A7 swimmers may be found in this class. Prior to the 1990s, the A3, A5, A6 and A7 classes were often grouped with other amputee classes in swimming competitions, including the Paralympic Games.

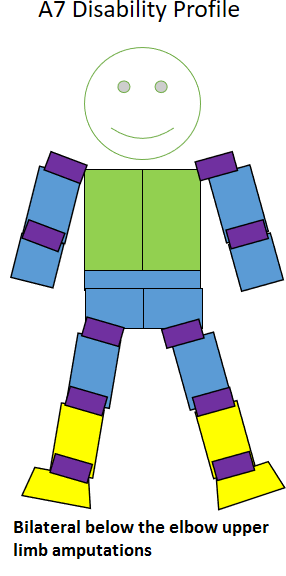
Visualization of an A5 classified swimmer competing in S7

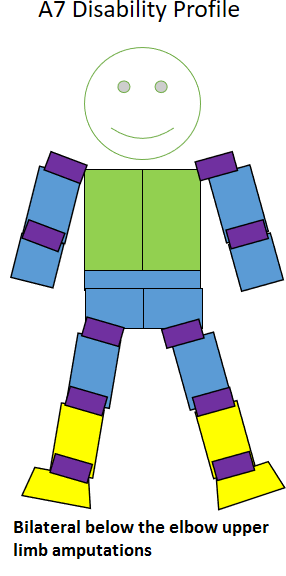
Visualization of an A6 classified swimmer competing in S7

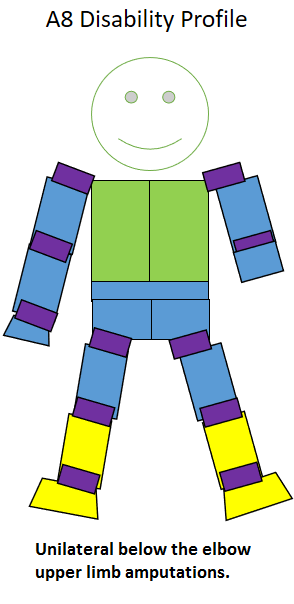
Visualization of an A7 classified swimmer competing in S7

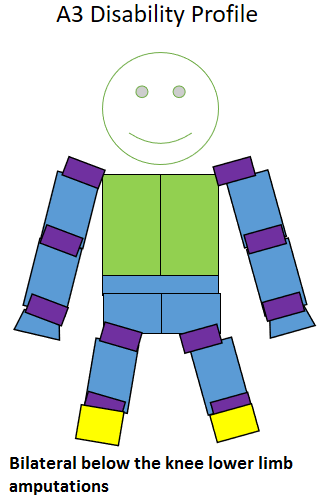
Visualization of an A3 classified swimmer competing in S7

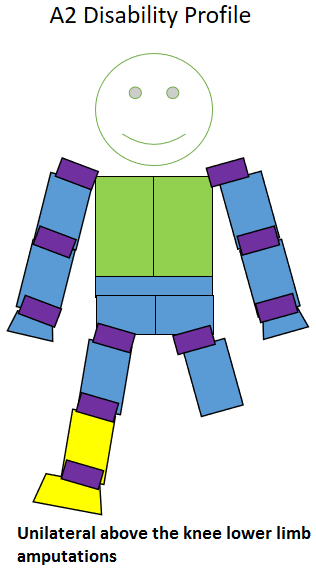
Visualization of an A2 classified swimmer competing in S7

==== Upper limb amputees ====
Because the legs of A5, A6 and A7 are their greatest strength, they modify their entry into the water to take advantage of this. Compared to able bodied swimmers, swimmers in this class have a shorter stroke length and increased stroke rate. The nature of a person's amputations in the A5, A6 and A7 class can affect their physiology and sports performance. Because they are missing a limb, amputees are more prone to overuse injuries in their remaining limbs. Common problems for intact upper limbs for people in this class include rotator cuffs tearing, shoulder impingement, epicondylitis and peripheral nerve entrapment.

A study was done comparing the performance of swimming competitors at the 1984 Summer Paralympics. It found there was no significant difference in performance in times between women in A4, A5 and A6 the 100 meter 100 meter freestyle, men in A4 and A5 in the 100 meter freestyle, men in A5 and A6 in the 100 meter freestyle, women in A5 and A6 in the 50 meter butterfly, women in A4, A5 and A6 in the 4 x 50 meter individual medley, men in A5 and A6 in the 4 x 50 meter individual medley, and men and women in A4, A5 and A6 in the 100 meter backstroke.

==== Lower limb amputees ====
A3 swimmers in this class have a similar stroke length and stroke rate to able bodied swimmers. A study was done comparing the performance of swimming competitors at the 1984 Summer Paralympics. It found there was no significant difference in performance in times between men and women in A2 and A3 in the 50 meter breaststroke, men and women in A2 and A3 in the 50 meter freestyle, men and women in A2, A3 and A4 in the 25 meter butterfly, and men in A2 and A3 in the 50 meter backstroke.

The nature of an A3 swimmer's amputations in this class can affect their physiology and sports performance. Because of the potential for balance issues related to having an amputation, during weight training, amputees are encouraged to use a spotter when lifting more than 15 pounds (6.8 kg). Lower limb amputations affect a person's energy cost for being mobile. To keep their oxygen consumption rate similar to people without lower limb amputations, they need to walk slower. A3 swimmers use around 41% more oxygen to walk or run the same distance as someone without a lower limb amputation. A2 swimmers use around 87% more oxygen to walk or run the same distance as someone without a lower limb amputation.

=== Cerebral palsy ===
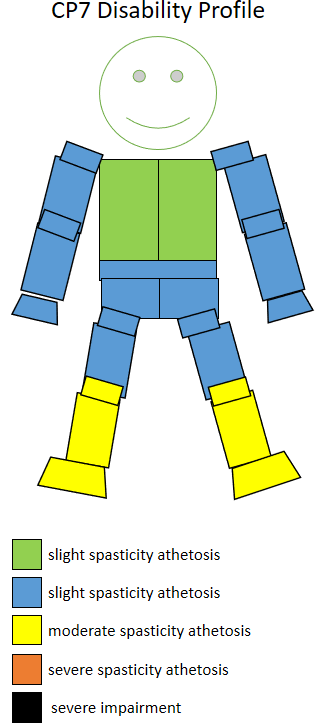
The spasticity athetosis level and location of a CP7 sportsperson.

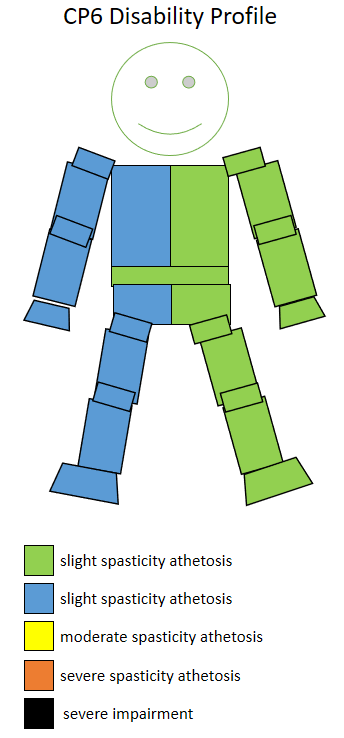
The spasticity athetosis level and location of a CP6 sportsperson.

This class includes people with several disability types include cerebral palsy. CP6 and CP7 class swimmers are sometimes found in this class.

CP6 sportspeople are able to walk without the need for an assistive device. They lack coordination in all their limbs, with the greater lack of coordination involving their upper body. Their bodies are often in motion, and they cannot maintain a still state. While CP2, CP3 and CP6 have similar issues with Athetoid or Ataxic, CP6 competitors have "flight" while they are ambulant in that it is possible for both feet to not be touching the ground while walking. CP2 and CP3 are unable to do this.

CP7 sportspeople are able to walk, but appear to do so while having a limp as one side of their body is more affected than the other. They may have involuntary muscle spasms on one side of their body. They have fine motor control on the dominant side of the body, which can present as asymmetry when they are in motion. People in this class tend to have energy expenditure similar to people without cerebral palsy.

Because of the neuromuscular nature of their disability, CP7 swimmers have slower start times than other people in their classes. They are also more likely to interlock their hands when underwater in some strokes to prevent hand drift, which increases drag while swimming. CP6 and CP7 swimmers experience "swimmer's shoulder", a swimming related injury, at rates similar to their able-bodied counterparts. When fatigued, asymmetry in their stroke becomes a problem for swimmers in this class. The integrated classification system used for swimming, where swimmers with CP compete against those with other disabilities, is subject to criticisms: such as that the nature of CP is that greater exertion leads to decreased dexterity and fine motor movements. This puts competitors with CP at a disadvantage when competing against people with amputations who do not lose coordination as a result of exertion.

CP6 swimmers tend to have a passive normalized drag in the range of 0.5 to 0.8. This puts them into the passive drag band of PDB6, PDB7, PDB8, PDB9, and PDB10. CP7 swimmers tend to have a passive normalized drag in the range of 0.6 to 0.8. This puts them into the passive drag band of PDB6, PDB8, and PDB9.

=== Spinal cord injuries ===
People with spinal cord injuries compete in this class, including F6 sportspeople.

==== F6 ====
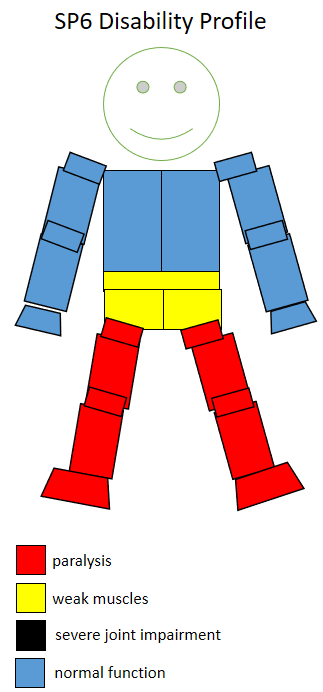
Functional profile of a wheelchair sportsperson in the F6 class.

This is a wheelchair sport classification that corresponds to the neurological level L2 - L5. Historically, this class has been known as Lower 4, Upper 5. People with lesions at L4 have issues with their lower back muscles, hip flexors and their quadriceps. People with lesions at L4 to S2 who are complete paraplegics may have motor function issues in their glutes and hamstrings. Their quadriceps are likely to be unaffected. Sensation below the knees and in the groin area may be absent.

People in this class have good sitting balance. People with lesions at L4 have trunk stability, can lift a leg and can flex their hips. They can walk independently with the use of longer leg braces. They may use a wheelchair for the sake of convenience. Recommended sports include many standing related sports. People in this class have a total respiratory capacity of 88% compared to people without a disability.

S7 swimmers with spinal cord injuries tend to be complete paraplegics with lesions below L2 to L3. When swimming, they are able to do an effective catch phase because of good hand control. They can use their arms to get power and maintain control. Their hips are higher in the water than lower numbered classes for people with spinal cord injuries. While they have no kick movement in their legs, they are able to keep their legs in a streamlined position. They use their hands for turns. They either do a sitting dive start or start in the water.

A study was done comparing the performance of athletics competitors at the 1984 Summer Paralympics. It found there was little significant difference in performance times between women in 4 (SP5, SP6), 5 (SP6, SP7) and 6 (SP7) in the 100m breaststroke. It found there was little significant difference in performance times between women in 4 (SP5, SP6), 5 (SP6, SP7) and 6 (SP7) in the 100m backstroke. It found there was little significant difference in performance times between women in 4 (SP5, SP6), 5 (SP6, SP7) and 6 (SP7) in the 100m freestyle. It found there was little significant difference in performance times between women in 4 (SP5, SP6), 5 (SP6, SP7) and 6 (SP7) in the 4 x 50m individual medley. It found there was little significant difference in performance times between men in 4 (SP5, SP6), 5 (SP6, SP7) and 6 (SP7) in the 100m backstroke. It found there was little significant difference in performance times between men in 4 (SP5, SP6), 5 (SP6, SP7) and 6 (SP7) in the 100m breaststroke. It found there was little significant difference in performance times between women in 2 (SP4), 3 (SP4, SP5) and 4 (SP5, SP6) in the 25m butterfly. It found there was little significant difference in performance times between men in 2 (SP4), 3 (SP4, SP5) and 4 (SP5, SP6) in the 25m butterfly. It found there was little significant difference in performance times between women in 5 (SP6, SP7) and 6 (SP7) in the 50m butterfly. It found there was little significant difference in performance times between men in 5 (SP6, SP7) and 6 (SP7) in the 4 x 50m individual medley. It found there was little significant difference in performance times between men in 5 (SP6, SP7) and 6 (SP7) in the 100m freestyle.

== History ==
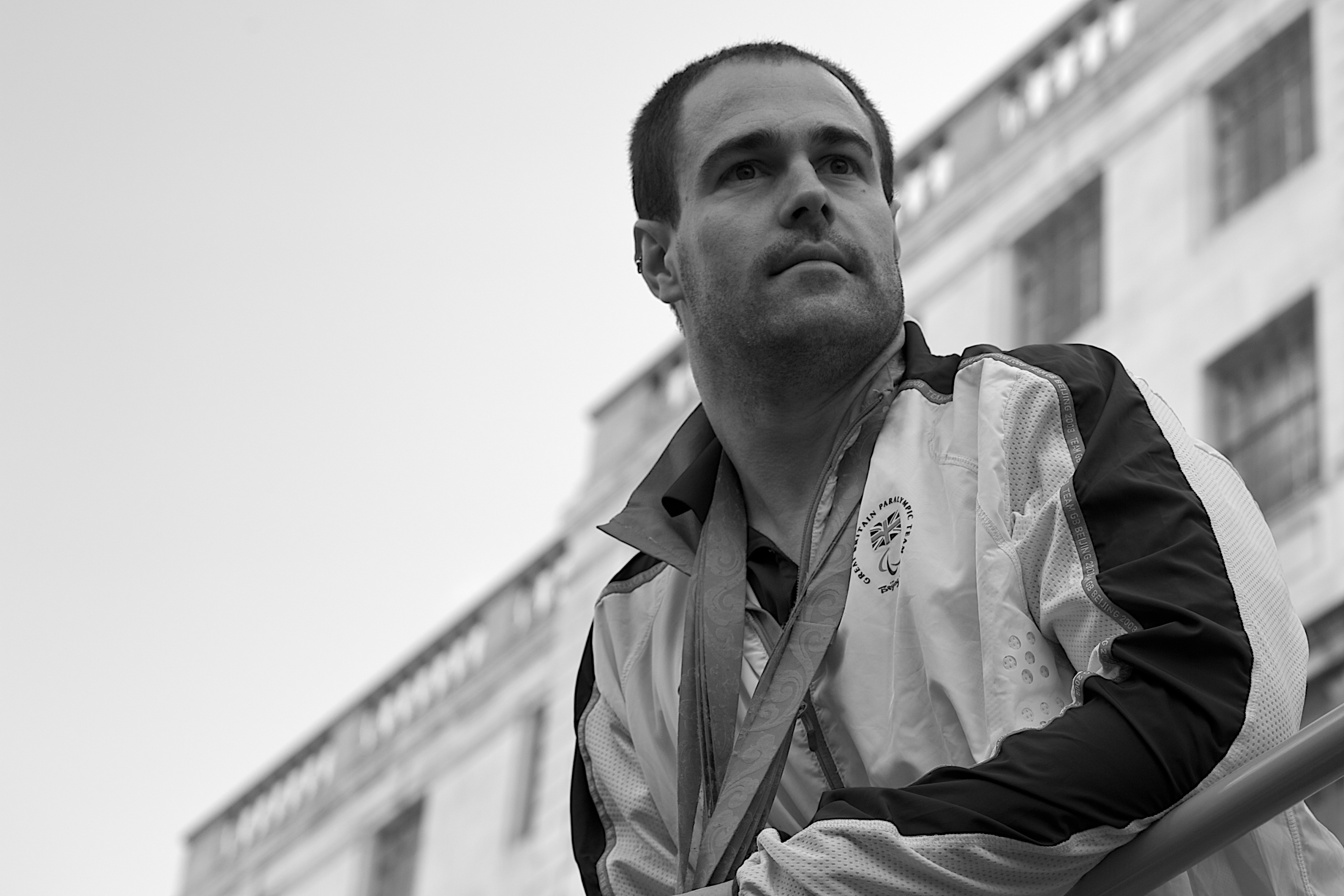
David Roberts is an S7 classified swimmer

The classification was created by the International Paralympic Committee. In 2003 the committee approved a plan which recommended the development of a universal classification code. The code was approved in 2007, and defines the "objective of classification as developing and implementing accurate, reliable and consistent sport focused classification systems", which are known as "evidence based, sport specific classification". In November 2015, they approved the revised classification code, which "aims to further develop evidence based, sport specific classification in all sports".

In 1997, Against the odds : New Zealand Paralympians said this classification was graded along a gradient, with S1 being the most disabled and S10 being the least disabled.

== At the Paralympic Games ==
For the 2016 Summer Paralympics in Rio, the International Paralympic Committee had a zero classification at the Games policy. This policy was put into place in 2014, with the goal of avoiding last minute changes in classes that would negatively impact athlete training preparations. All competitors needed to be internationally classified with their classification status confirmed prior to the Games, with exceptions to this policy being dealt with on a case-by-case basis.

== Competitions ==
For this classification, organisers of the Paralympic Games have the option of including the following events on the Paralympic programme: 50m and 100m Freestyle, 400m Freestyle, 100m Backstroke, 50m Butterfly, 100m Breaststroke and 200m Individual Medley events.

== Records ==
50m

As of February 2013, Great Britain's David Roberts holds the S7 men's world record for the 50 m freestyle long course event, with a time of 00:27.67. The S7 women's world record is held by the American Mallory Weggemann with a time of 00:31.64. As of September 2021, Canada’s Danielle Dorris holds the women’s S7 50m butterfly world record at 32.99.

200m

In the 200 m individual medley event held in the Tokyo 2020 Paralympic Games, the S7 men's world record is held by Israel's Mark Malyar with a time of 2:29.01 (breaking the last record by almost 2 seconds).

400m

In the 400 m freestyle long course event, the S7 men's world record is held by Great Britain's Josef Craig with a time of 4:42.81. The S7 women's world record is held by the Australian Jacqueline Freney in a time of 4:59.02.

== Getting classified ==
Classification generally has four phases. The first stage of classification is a health examination. For amputees in this class, this is often done on site at a sports training facility or competition. The second stage is observation in practice, the third stage is observation in competition and the last stage is assigning the sportsperson to a relevant class. Sometimes the health examination may not be done on site for amputees in this class because the nature of the amputation could cause alterations to the body that are not physically visible.

Swimming classification generally has three components. The first is a bench press. The second is water test. The third is in competition observation. As part of the water test, swimmers are often required to demonstrate their swimming technique for all four strokes. They usually swim a distance of 25 meters for each stroke. They are also generally required to demonstrate how they enter the water and how they turn in the pool.

In Australia, to be classified in this category, athletes contact the Australian Paralympic Committee or their state swimming governing body. In the United States, classification is handled by the United States Paralympic Committee on a national level. The classification test has three components: "a bench test, a water test, observation during competition." American swimmers are assessed by four people: a medical classifier, two general classifiers and a technical classifier.

== Competitors ==
Swimmers who have competed in this classification include Veronica Almeida, Chantal Boonacker and Kirsten Bruhn who all won medals in their class at the 2008 Paralympics. American swimmers who have been classified by the United States Paralympic Committee as being in this class include Alexis Allen, Carly Allen, Segun Arigbede and Benjamin Park.
