= Swimming at the 2016 Summer Paralympics – Men's 100 metre freestyle =

The men's 100 m freestyle swimming events for the 2016 Summer Paralympics took place at the Olympic Aquatics Stadium from 8 to 17 September. A total of eleven events were contested for different classifications.

== Competition format ==
Each event consisted of two rounds: heats and final. The top eight swimmers overall in the heats progressed to the final. If there were less than eight swimmers in an event, no heats were held and all swimmers qualify for the final.

== Results ==
=== S4 ===
18:33 8 September 2016:

Rank	Lane	Name	Nationality	Time	Notes
1st place, gold medalist(s)	5	Gi Seong Jo	South Korea	1:23.36	
2nd place, silver medalist(s)	4	Zhipeng Jin	China	1:26.05	
3rd place, bronze medalist(s)	2	Michael Schoenmaker	Netherlands	1:26.87	
4	3	David Smetanine	France	1:26.88	
5	6	Darko Duric	Slovenia	1:27.17	
6	7	Gustavo Sanchez Martinez	Mexico	1:28.57	
7	1	Andrii Derevinskyi	Ukraine	1:30.59	
8	8	Jan Povysil	Czech Republic	1:34.26	

=== S5 ===
19:22 17 September 2016:

Rank	Lane	Name	Nationality	Time	Notes
1st place, gold medalist(s)	4	Daniel Dias	Brazil	1:10.11	
2nd place, silver medalist(s)	5	Roy Perkins	United States	1:14.55	
3rd place, bronze medalist(s)	7	Andrew Mullen	Great Britain	1:15.93	
4	6	Sebastian Rodriguez	Spain	1:17.10	
5	3	Thanh Tung Vo	Vietnam	1:18.02	
6	2	Theo Curin	France	1:18.68	
7	8	James Scully	Ireland	1:20.18	
8	1	Clodoaldo Silva	Brazil	1:20.80	

=== S6 ===
17:30 17 September 2016:

Rank	Lane	Name	Nationality	Time	Notes
1st place, gold medalist(s)	4	Lorenzo Perez Escalona	Cuba	1:04.70	PR
2nd place, silver medalist(s)	2	Nelson Crispín	Colombia	1:05.37	
3rd place, bronze medalist(s)	6	Oleksandr Komarov	Ukraine	1:06.21	
4	5	Hongguang Jia	China	1:06.28	
5	3	Thijs van Hofweegen	Netherlands	1:08.05	
6	8	Matthew Haanappel	Australia	1:09.24	
7	7	Oscar Osorio Campaz	Colombia	1:09.45	
8	1	Francesco Bocciardo	Italy	1:09.64	

=== S7 ===
17:30 16 September 2016:

Rank	Lane	Name	Nationality	Time	Notes
1st place, gold medalist(s)	3	Shiyun Pan	China	1:00.82	
2nd place, silver medalist(s)	5	Carlos Serrano Zárate	Colombia	1:01.84	
3rd place, bronze medalist(s)	8	Ievgenii Bogodaiko	Ukraine	1:02.12	
4	6	Matthew Levy	Australia	1:02.28	
5	4	Jonathan Fox	Great Britain	1:03.91	
6	7	Michael Jones	Great Britain	1:04.69	
7	2	Tobias Pollap	Germany	1:04.76	
8	1	Marian Kvasnytsia	Ukraine	1:06.76	

=== S8 ===
19:29 11 September 2016:

Rank	Lane	Name	Nationality	Time	Notes
1st place, gold medalist(s)	5	Yinan Wang	China	56.80	
2nd place, silver medalist(s)	2	Maodang Song	China	58.13	
3rd place, bronze medalist(s)	4	Josef Craig	Great Britain	58.19	
4	6	Oliver Hynd	Great Britain	58.85	
5	3	Guanglong Yang	China	59.17	
6	7	Bohdan Hrynenko	Ukraine	59.74	
7	8	Zack McAllister	Canada	1:01.37	
8	1	Luis Armando Andrade Guillen	Mexico	1:01.90	

=== S9 ===
19:03 12 September 2016:

Rank	Lane	Name	Nationality	Time	Notes
1st place, gold medalist(s)	4	Timothy Disken	Australia	56.23	
2nd place, silver medalist(s)	5	Brenden Hall	Australia	56.95	
3rd place, bronze medalist(s)	3	Tamás Tóth	Hungary	57.20	
4	7	Federico Morlacchi	Italy	57.28	
5	2	Ruiter Silva	Brazil	57.44	
6	1	Tamás Sors	Hungary	57.49	
7	6	Jose Antonio Mari Alcaraz	Spain	57.62	
8	8	Takuro Yamada	Japan	57.69	

=== S10 ===
18:10 13 September 2016:

Rank	Lane	Name	Nationality	Time	Notes
1st place, gold medalist(s)	4	Maksym Krypak	Ukraine	51.08	
2nd place, silver medalist(s)	2	André Brasil	Brazil	51.37	
3rd place, bronze medalist(s)	3	Phelipe Rodrigues	Brazil	51.48	
4	5	Denys Dubrov	Ukraine	51.54	
5	6	Rowan Crothers	Australia	52.17	
6	8	Dmytro Vanzenko	Ukraine	54.03	
7	7	Nathan Stein	Canada	54.43	
8	1	Olivier van de Voort	Netherlands	55.04	

=== S11 ===
19:06 15 September 2016:

Rank	Lane	Name	Nationality	Time	Notes
1st place, gold medalist(s)	4	Bradley Snyder	United States	56.15	WR
2nd place, silver medalist(s)	5	Bozun Yang	China	59.51	
3rd place, bronze medalist(s)	1	Keiichi Kimura	Japan	59.63	
4	2	Hendri Herbst	South Africa	59.71	
5	3	Matheus Souza	Brazil	59.80	
6	6	Hryhory Zudzilau	Belarus	1:00.21	
7	7	Wojciech Makowski	Poland	1:01.74	
8	8	Miroslav Smrcka	Czech Republic	1:02.95	

=== S13 ===
19:24 16 September 2016:

Rank	Lane	Name	Nationality	Time	Notes
1st place, gold medalist(s)	4	Ihar Boki	Belarus	50.90	PR
2nd place, silver medalist(s)	3	Iaroslav Denysenko	Ukraine	52.40	
3rd place, bronze medalist(s)	5	Maksym Veraksa	Ukraine	52.77	
4	2	Sergii Klippert	Ukraine	53.64	
5	6	Carlos Farrenberg	Brazil	53.81	
6	1	Muzaffar Tursunkhujaev	Uzbekistan	53.90	
7	8	Braedan Jason	Australia	54.04	
8	7	Dzmitry Salei	Azerbaijan	54.73	
