= Swimming at the 2016 Summer Paralympics – Men's 400 metre freestyle =

The men's 400 m freestyle swimming events for the 2016 Summer Paralympics took place at the Olympic Aquatics Stadium from 8 to 15 September. A total of seven events were contested for seven different classifications.

== Competition format ==
Each event consists of two rounds: heats and final. The top eight swimmers overall in the heats progress to the final. If there are eight or fewer swimmers in an event, no heats are held and all swimmers qualify for the final.

== Results ==
=== S6 ===
17:30 13 September 2016:

Rank	Lane	Name	Nationality	Time	Notes
1st place, gold medalist(s)	5	Francesco Bocciardo	Italy	5:02.15	
2nd place, silver medalist(s)	4	Thijs van Hofweegen	Netherlands	5:07.82	
3rd place, bronze medalist(s)	6	Lorenzo Perez Escalona	Cuba	5:14.44	
4	2	Talisson Glock	Brazil	5:17.24	
5	3	Jinbiao Luo	China	5:21.34	
6	1	Matthew Haanappel	Australia	5:28.95	
7	7	Hamish McLean	New Zealand	5:30.63	
8	8	Hong Yang	China	5:33.71	

=== S7 ===
17:44 14 September 2016:

Rank	Lane	Name	Nationality	Time	Notes
1st place, gold medalist(s)	3	Michael Jones	Great Britain	4:45.78	
2nd place, silver medalist(s)	4	Jonathan Fox	Great Britain	4:49.00	
3rd place, bronze medalist(s)	6	Andreas Skaar Bjornstad	Norway	4:53.61	
4	7	Carlos Serrano Zárate	Colombia	4:57.29	
5	2	Facundo Jose Arregui	Argentina	4:57.40	
6	5	Marian Kvasnytsia	Ukraine	4:57.54	
7	1	Antoni Ponce Bertran	Spain	5:09.43	
8	8	Andriy Kozlenko	Ukraine	5:19.60	

=== S8 ===
The S8 event took place on 8 September.

Rank	Lane	Name	Nationality	Time	Notes
1st place, gold medalist(s)	4	Oliver Hynd	Great Britain	4:21.89	WR
2nd place, silver medalist(s)	7	Xu Haijiao	China	4:25.65	AS
3rd place, bronze medalist(s)	2	Wang Yinan	China	4:32.78	
4	3	Caio Oliveira	Brazil	4:33.97	
5	5	Robert Griswold	United States	4:36.26	
6	1	Josef Craig	Great Britain	4:39.04	
7	6	Blake Cochrane	Australia	4:39.79	
8	8	Jesse Aungles	Australia	4:48.23	

=== S9 ===
The S9 event took place on 9 September.

Rank	Lane	Name	Nationality	Time	Notes
1st place, gold medalist(s)	4	Brenden Hall	Australia	4:12.73	
2nd place, silver medalist(s)	5	Federico Morlacchi	Italy	4:17.91	
3rd place, bronze medalist(s)	3	Lewis White	Great Britain	4:21.38	
4	2	José Antonio Mari-Alcaraz	Spain	4:23.04	
5	7	Jonathan Booth	Great Britain	4:24.02	
6	1	Kristijan Vincetic	Croatia	4:26.28	
7	8	Logan Powell	Australia	4:27.22	
8	6	David Grachat	Portugal	4:27.73	

=== S10 ===
17:57 15 September 2016:

Rank	Lane	Name	Nationality	Time	Notes
1st place, gold medalist(s)	4	Maksym Krypak	Ukraine	3:57.71	WR
2nd place, silver medalist(s)	3	Denys Dubrov	Ukraine	4:00.11	
3rd place, bronze medalist(s)	6	Benoit Huot	Canada	4:04.63	
4	5	Bas Takken	Netherlands	4:05.46	
5	7	Dmytro Vanzenko	Ukraine	4:10.19	
6	8	Rowan Crothers	Australia	4:10.83	
7	1	André Brasil	Brazil	4:11.12	
8	2	Guy Harrison-Murray	Australia	4:11.18	

=== S11 ===
The S11 event took place on 10 September.

Rank	Lane	Name	Nationality	Time	Notes
1st place, gold medalist(s)	4	Bradley Snyder	United States	4:28.78	
2nd place, silver medalist(s)	3	Tharon Drake	United States	4:40.96	
3rd place, bronze medalist(s)	6	Matheus Souza	Brazil	4:41.05	
4	5	Israel Oliver	Spain	4:43.17	
5	2	Viktor Smyrnov	Ukraine	4:48.71	
6	7	Dmytro Zalevskyi	Ukraine	5:02.38	
7	1	Sergio Zayas	Argentina	5:06.77	
8	8	Edgaras Matakas	Lithuania	5:30.66	

=== S13 ===
17:30 12 September 2016:

Rank	Lane	Name	Nationality	Time	Notes
1st place, gold medalist(s)	4	Ihar Boki	Belarus	3:55.62	PR
2nd place, silver medalist(s)	5	Iaroslav Denysenko	Ukraine	3:58.78	
3rd place, bronze medalist(s)	3	Dmitriy Horlin	Uzbekistan	4:06.63	PR
4	7	Danylo Chufarov	Ukraine	4:10.92	
5	2	Braedan Jason	Australia	4:12.95	
6	1	Jacob Templeton	Australia	4:15.86	
7	6	Raman Salei	Azerbaijan	4:19.34	
8	8	Thomaz Matera	Brazil	4:19.62	
