= Swimming at the 2020 Summer Paralympics – Men's 50 metre butterfly S6 =

Men's 50 metre butterfly S6 at the XVI Paralympic Games
- Venue: Tokyo Aquatics Centre
- Dates: 30 August 2021
- Competitors: 16 from 13 nations

Medalists
1st place, gold medalist(s)		Wang Jingang	China
2nd place, silver medalist(s)		Jia Hongguang	China
3rd place, bronze medalist(s)		Nelson Crispín	Colombia

The men's 50 metre butterfly S6 event at the 2020 Paralympic Games took place on 30 August 2021, at the Tokyo Aquatics Centre.

== Heats ==
The swimmers with the top eight times, regardless of heat, advanced to the final.

Rank	Heat	Lane	Name	Nationality	Time	Notes
1	2	4	Wang Jingang	China	30.81	Q
2	1	4	Nelson Crispín	Colombia	31.66	Q
3	1	6	Jia Hongguang	China	32.16	Q
4	2	3	David Sanchez Sierra	Spain	32.45	Q
5	2	5	Laurent Chardard	France	32.76	Q
6	2	6	Gabriel Melone de Oliveira	Brazil	32.93	Q
7	1	5	Yerzhan Salimgereyev	Kazakhstan	33.14	Q
8	2	7	Alejandro Yared Rojas Cabrera	Spain	33.87	Q
9	2	2	Talisson Glock	Brazil	33.89	
10	1	2	Zach Shattuck	United States	34.43	
11	1	3	Andrei Granichka	RPC	34.87	
12	1	7	Oleksandr Komarov	Ukraine	35.16	
13	2	1	Matías de Andrade	Argentina	35.77	
14	1	8	Gary Bejino	Philippines	36.14	
15	1	1	Panagiotis Christakis	Greece	36.84	
16	2	8	Tim Znidarsic Svensek	Slovenia	37.47	

== Final ==
50m butterfly final
Rank	Lane	Name	Nationality	Time	Notes
1st place, gold medalist(s)	4	Wang Jingang	China	30.81	
2nd place, silver medalist(s)	3	Jia Hongguang	China	31.54	
3rd place, bronze medalist(s)	5	Nelson Crispín	Colombia	31.77	
4	2	Laurent Chardard	France	32.29	
5	6	David Sanchez Sierra	Spain	32.49	
6	1	Yerzhan Salimgereyev	Kazakhstan	32.53	
7	7	Gabriel Melone De Oliveira	Brazil	33.01	
8	8	Alejandro Yared Rojas Cabrera	Spain	33.60	
