= Swimming at the 2016 Summer Paralympics – Men's 100 metre freestyle S6 =

Men's 100 metre freestyle S6 at the XV Paralympic Games
- Venue: Olympic Aquatics Stadium
- Dates: 17 September 2016
- Competitors: 18 from 13 nations

Medalists
1st place, gold medalist(s)		Lorenzo Perez Escalona	Cuba
2nd place, silver medalist(s)		Nelson Crispín	Colombia
3rd place, bronze medalist(s)		Oleksandr Komarov	Ukraine

The Men's 100 metre freestyle S6 event at the 2016 Paralympic Games took place on 17 September 2016, at the Olympic Aquatics Stadium. Three heats were held. The swimmers with the eight fastest times advanced to the final.

== Heats ==
=== Heat 1 ===
9:30 17 September 2016:

Rank	Lane	Name	Nationality	Time	Notes
1	4	Oleksandr Komarov	Ukraine	1:08.50	Q
2	5	Qing Xu	China	1:10.36	
3	3	Georgios Sfaltos	Greece	1:12.15	
4	2	Panagiotis Christakis	Greece	1:14.05	
5	7	Aung Myint Myat	Myanmar	1:14.12	
6	6	Adriano de Lima	Brazil	1:15.13	

=== Heat 2 ===
9:33 17 September 2016:

Rank	Lane	Name	Nationality	Time	Notes
1	3	Thijs van Hofweegen	Netherlands	1:08.48	Q
2	4	Nelson Crispín	Colombia	1:08.54	Q
3	5	Francesco Bocciardo	Italy	1:09.63	Q
4	6	Jinbiao Luo	China	1:10.55	
5	7	Hamish McLean	New Zealand	1:15.30	
6	2	Agus Ngaimin	Indonesia	1:21.21	

=== Heat 3 ===
9:36 17 September 2016:

Rank	Lane	Name	Nationality	Time	Notes
1	4	Lorenzo Perez Escalona	Cuba	1:07.69	Q
2	5	Hongguang Jia	China	1:08.38	Q
3	2	Oscar Osorio Campaz	Colombia	1:09.56	Q
4	3	Matthew Haanappel	Australia	1:09.96	Q
5	6	Talisson Glock	Brazil	1:12.52	
6	7	Yoav Valinsky	Israel	1:14.59	

== Final ==
17:30 17 September 2016:

Rank	Lane	Name	Nationality	Time	Notes
1st place, gold medalist(s)	4	Lorenzo Perez Escalona	Cuba	1:04.70	PR
2nd place, silver medalist(s)	2	Nelson Crispín	Colombia	1:05.37	
3rd place, bronze medalist(s)	6	Oleksandr Komarov	Ukraine	1:06.21	
4	5	Hongguang Jia	China	1:06.28	
5	3	Thijs van Hofweegen	Netherlands	1:08.05	
6	8	Matthew Haanappel	Australia	1:09.24	
7	7	Oscar Osorio Campaz	Colombia	1:09.45	
8	1	Francesco Bocciardo	Italy	1:09.64	
