= Swimming at the 2016 Summer Paralympics – Men's 100 metre backstroke S6 =

Men's 100 metre backstroke S6 at the XIV Paralympic Games
- Venue: Olympic Aquatics Stadium
- Dates: 8 September 2016
- Competitors: 12 from 9 nations

The men's 100 metre backstroke S6 event at the 2016 Paralympic Games took place on 8 September, at the Olympic Aquatics Stadium.

Two heats were held, both with six swimmers. The swimmers with the eight fastest times advanced to the final.

== Heats ==
=== Heat 1 ===
Rank	Lane	Name	Nationality	Time	Notes
5	2	Matthew Haanappel	Australia	1:23.76	
3	3	Thijs van Hofweegen	Netherlands	1:20.42	
1	4	Zheng Tao	China	1:13.59	
2	5	Iaroslav Semenenko	Ukraine	1:14.78	
4	6	Luo Fangyu	China	1:21.56	
6	7	Yoav Valinsky	Israel	1:32.37	

=== Heat 2 ===
Rank	Lane	Name	Nationality	Time	Notes
	2	Myint Myat Aung	Myanmar		
	3	Oleksandr Komarov	Ukraine		
	4	Jia Hongguang	China		
	5	Talisson Glock	Brazil		
	6	Agus Ngaimin	Indonesia		
	7	Jawad Joudah	Iraq		
