= Swimming at the 2016 Summer Paralympics – Men's 50 metre freestyle S6 =

Men's 50 metre freestyle S6 at the XV Paralympic Games
- Venue: Olympic Aquatics Stadium
- Dates: 10 September 2016
- Competitors: 21 from 15 nations

Medalists
1st place, gold medalist(s)		Qing Xu	China
2nd place, silver medalist(s)		Nelson Crispín	Colombia
3rd place, bronze medalist(s)		Hongguang Jia	China

The Men's 50 metre freestyle S6 event at the 2016 Paralympic Games took place on 10 September 2016, at the Olympic Aquatics Stadium. Three heats were held. The swimmers with the eight fastest times advanced to the final.

== Heats ==
=== Heat 1 ===
9:46 10 September 2016:

Rank	Lane	Name	Nationality	Time	Notes
1	4	Qing Xu	China	30.82	Q
2	5	Oleksandr Komarov	Ukraine	31.07	Q
3	3	Oscar Osorio Campaz	Colombia	31.81	Q
4	6	Sascha Kindred	Great Britain	33.07	
5	2	Iaroslav Semenenko	Ukraine	33.49	
6	7	Raul Alberto Martinez Valdes	Mexico	33.51	
7	1	Marco Maria Dolfin	Italy	36.05	

=== Heat 2 ===
9:49 10 September 2016:

Rank	Lane	Name	Nationality	Time	Notes
1	4	Lorenzo Perez Escalona	Cuba	30.24	Q
2	6	Thijs van Hofweegen	Netherlands	31.81	Q
3	5	Tao Zheng	China	32.05	
4	3	Georgios Sfaltos	Greece	32.65	
5	2	Francesco Bocciardo	Italy	33.16	
6	1	Hamish McLean	New Zealand	34.81	
7	7	Agus Ngaimin	Indonesia	35.50	

=== Heat 3 ===
9:51 10 September 2016:

Rank	Lane	Name	Nationality	Time	Notes
1	5	Hongguang Jia	China	29.66	Q
2	4	Nelson Crispín	Colombia	29.68	Q
3	3	Matthew Haanappel	Australia	31.47	Q
4	6	Panagiotis Christakis	Greece	31.94	
5	7	Adriano de Lima	Brazil	33.92	
6	2	Kyosuke Oyama	Japan	33.99	
7	1	Nathan Clement	Canada	34.47	

== Final ==
17:44 10 September 2016:

Rank	Lane	Name	Nationality	Time	Notes
1st place, gold medalist(s)	6	Qing Xu	China	28.81	
2nd place, silver medalist(s)	5	Nelson Crispín	Colombia	29.27	
3rd place, bronze medalist(s)	4	Hongguang Jia	China	29.87	
4	3	Lorenzo Perez Escalona	Cuba	30.31	
5	7	Matthew Haanappel	Australia	30.77	
6	2	Oleksandr Komarov	Ukraine	31.06	
7	1	Oscar Osorio Campaz	Colombia	31.25	
8	8	Thijs van Hofweegen	Netherlands	31.27	
