= Swimming at the 2020 Summer Paralympics – Men's 100 metre backstroke S6 =

Men's 100 metre backstroke S6 at the XVI Paralympic Games
- Venue: Tokyo Aquatics Centre
- Dates: 3 September 2021
- Competitors: 20 from 16 nations

Medalists
1st place, gold medalist(s)		Jia Hongguang	China
2nd place, silver medalist(s)		Matías de Andrade	Argentina
3rd place, bronze medalist(s)		Dino Sinovčić	Croatia

The Men's 100 metre backstroke S6 event at the 2020 Paralympic Games took place on 3 September 2021, at the Tokyo Aquatics Centre.

== Heats ==
The swimmers with the top eight times, regardless of heat, advanced to the final.

Rank	Heat	Lane	Name	Nationality	Time	Notes
1	3	4	Jia Hongguang	China	1:14.15	Q
2	1	4	Matías de Andrade	Argentina	1:14.38	Q
3	2	4	Dino Sinovčić	Croatia	1:16.74	Q
4	1	5	Wang Jingang	China	1:18.20	Q
5	3	5	Yang Hong	China	1:18.57	Q
6	3	3	Thijs van Hofweegen	Netherlands	1:20.26	Q
7	2	5	Laurent Chardard	France	1:20.58	Q
8	3	7	David Sanchez Sierra	Spain	1:21.14	Q
9	1	3	Viacheslav Lenskii	RPC	1:21.45	
10	3	2	Nelson Crispín	Colombia	1:22.48	
11	2	6	Fabian Brune	Germany	1:24.13	
12	2	2	Oleksandr Komarov	Ukraine	1:24.41	
13	1	2	Gabriel Melone De Oliveira	Brazil	1:24.72	
14	1	6	Daniel Videira	Portugal	1:25.66	
15	1	7	Iurii Luchkin	RPC	1:25.75	
16	3	1	Tim Znidarsic Svensek	Slovenia	1:26.66	
17	2	7	Patrick Flanagan	Ireland	1:26.81	
18	3	6	Talisson Glock	Brazil	1:27.36	
19	2	3	Antonio Fantin	Italy	1:27.90	
20	2	1	Gary Bejino	Philippines	1:28.87	

== Final ==
Rank	Lane	Name	Nationality	Time	Notes
1st place, gold medalist(s)	4	Jia Hongguang	China	1:12.72	
2nd place, silver medalist(s)	5	Matías de Andrade	Argentina	1:15.40	
3rd place, bronze medalist(s)	3	Dino Sinovčić	Croatia	1:15.74	
4	2	Yang Hong	China	1:15.83	
5	6	Wang Jingang	China	1:16.51	
6	1	Laurent Chardard	France	1:19.00	
7	7	Thijs van Hofweegen	Netherlands	1:19.69	
8	8	David Sanchez Sierra	Spain	1:19.92	
