= Swimming at the 2020 Summer Paralympics – Men's 100 metre freestyle S6 =

Men's 100 metre freestyle S6 at the XVI Paralympic Games
- Venue: Tokyo Aquatics Centre
- Dates: 1 September 2021
- Competitors: 18 from 14 nations

Medalists
1st place, gold medalist(s)		Antonio Fantin	Italy
2nd place, silver medalist(s)		Nelson Crispín	Colombia
3rd place, bronze medalist(s)		Talisson Glock	Brazil

The men's 100 metre freestyle S6 event at the 2020 Paralympic Games took place on 1 September 2021, at the Tokyo Aquatics Centre.

== Heats ==
The swimmers with the top eight times, regardless of heat, advanced to the final.

Rank	Heat	Lane	Name	Nationality	Time	Notes
1	3	4	Antonio Fantin	Italy	1:04.16	Q, PR
2	1	5	Talisson Glock	Brazil	1:05.94	Q
3	2	4	Nelson Crispín	Colombia	1:06.85	Q
4	3	5	Oleksandr Komarov	Ukraine	1:07.41	Q
5	2	5	Laurent Chardard	France	1:07.69	Q
6	1	4	Thijs van Hofweegen	Netherlands	1:07.70	Q
7	3	6	Jia Hongguang	China	1:08.15	Q
8	2	3	Wang Jingang	China	1:08.61	Q
9	3	3	Lorenzo Perez Escalona	Cuba	1:08.62	
10	2	6	Viacheslav Lenskii	RPC	1:09.19	
11	1	6	Yerzhan Salimgereyev	Kazakhstan	1:10.89	
12	1	3	Juan José Gutierrez Bermúdez	Mexico	1:10.99	
13	3	7	Gabriel Melone	Brazil	1:12.63	
14	2	7	Dino Sinovčić	Croatia	1:13.26	
15	3	2	Raúl Gutiérrez Bermúdez	Mexico	1:13.41	
16	2	2	Leo McCrea	Switzerland	1:13.94	
17	1	2	Yang Hong	China	1:14.57	
18	1	7	William Perry	Great Britain	1:14.75	

== Final ==
100m freestyle final
Rank	Lane	Name	Nationality	Time	Notes
1st place, gold medalist(s)	4	Antonio Fantin	Italy	1:03.71	WR
2nd place, silver medalist(s)	3	Nelson Crispín	Colombia	1:04.82	
3rd place, bronze medalist(s)	5	Talisson Glock	Brazil	1:05.45	
4	1	Jia Hongguang	China	1:05.55	AS
5	7	Thijs van Hofweegen	Netherlands	1:06.39	
6	6	Oleksandr Komarov	Ukraine	1:07.02	
7	2	Laurent Chardard	France	1:07.60	
8	8	Wang Jingang	China	1:08.61	
