= Swimming at the 2016 Summer Paralympics – Men's 400 metre freestyle S6 =

Men's 400 metre freestyle S6 at the XV Paralympic Games
- Venue: Olympic Aquatics Stadium
- Dates: 13 September 2016
- Competitors: 11 from 9 nations

Medalists
1st place, gold medalist(s)		Francesco Bocciardo	Italy
2nd place, silver medalist(s)		Thijs van Hofweegen	Netherlands
3rd place, bronze medalist(s)		Lorenzo Perez Escalona	Cuba

The men's 400 metre freestyle S6 event at the 2016 Paralympic Games took place on 13 September 2016, at the Olympic Aquatics Stadium. Two heats were held. The swimmers with the eight fastest times advanced to the final.

== Heats ==
=== Heat 1 ===
9:30 13 September 2016:

Rank	Lane	Name	Nationality	Time	Notes
1	5	Thijs van Hofweegen	Netherlands	5:11.79	Q
2	4	Talisson Glock	Brazil	5:22.52	Q
3	3	Hamish McLean	New Zealand	5:22.88	Q
4	6	Hong Yang	China	5:44.82	Q
5	2	Karl Forsman	Sweden	6:04.09	

=== Heat 2 ===
9:38 13 September 2016:

Rank	Lane	Name	Nationality	Time	Notes
1	4	Francesco Bocciardo	Italy	5:18.61	Q
2	6	Jinbiao Luo	China	5:20.77	Q
3	5	Lorenzo Perez Escalona	Cuba	5:20.79	Q
4	3	Matthew Haanappel	Australia	5:36.09	Q
5	2	Marco Maria Dolfin	Italy	6:00.87	
6	7	Agus Ngaimin	Indonesia	6:42.71	

== Final ==
17:30 13 September 2016:

Rank	Lane	Name	Nationality	Time	Notes
1st place, gold medalist(s)	5	Francesco Bocciardo	Italy	5:02.15	
2nd place, silver medalist(s)	4	Thijs van Hofweegen	Netherlands	5:07.82	
3rd place, bronze medalist(s)	6	Lorenzo Perez Escalona	Cuba	5:14.44	
4	2	Talisson Glock	Brazil	5:17.24	
5	3	Jinbiao Luo	China	5:21.34	
6	1	Matthew Haanappel	Australia	5:28.95	
7	7	Hamish McLean	New Zealand	5:30.63	
8	8	Hong Yang	China	5:33.71	
