= Swimming at the 2016 Summer Paralympics – Men's 200 metre individual medley SM6 =

Men's 200 metre individual medley SM6 at the XV Paralympic Games
- Venue: Olympic Aquatics Stadium
- Dates: 12 September 2016
- Competitors: 12 from 9 nations

Medalists
1st place, gold medalist(s)		Sascha Kindred	Great Britain
2nd place, silver medalist(s)		Hongguang Jia	China
3rd place, bronze medalist(s)		Talisson Glock	Brazil

The Men's 200 metre individual medley SM6 event at the 2016 Paralympic Games took place on 12 September 2016, at the Olympic Aquatics Stadium. Two heats were held. The swimmers with the eight fastest times advanced to the final.

== Heats ==
=== Heat 1 ===
11:18 12 September 2016:

Rank	Lane	Name	Nationality	Time	Notes
1	4	Sascha Kindred	Great Britain	2:43.75	Q
2	5	Hongguang Jia	China	2:45.45	Q
3	3	Qing Xu	China	2:53.88	Q
4	2	Yoav Valinsky	Israel	2:57.68	Q
5	6	Panagiotis Christakis	Greece	2:59.64	
6	7	Marco Maria Dolfin	Italy	3:23.30	

=== Heat 2 ===
11:24 12 September 2016:

Rank	Lane	Name	Nationality	Time	Notes
1	5	Nelson Crispín	Colombia	2:42.25	Q
2	3	Hong Yang	China	2:43.19	Q
3	4	Talisson Glock	Brazil	2:44.94	Q
4	6	Iaroslav Semenenko	Ukraine	2:59.51	Q
5	2	Hamish McLean	New Zealand	2:59.81	
6	7	Roberto Rodriguez	Brazil	3:17.42	

== Final ==
19:31 12 September 2016:

Rank	Lane	Name	Nationality	Time	Notes
1st place, gold medalist(s)	3	Sascha Kindred	Great Britain	2:38.47	WR
2nd place, silver medalist(s)	2	Hongguang Jia	China	2:39.47	
3rd place, bronze medalist(s)	6	Talisson Glock	Brazil	2:41.39	
4	7	Qing Xu	China	2:42.57	
5	5	Hong Yang	China	2:42.92	
6	8	Iaroslav Semenenko	Ukraine	2:54.74	
7	1	Yoav Valinsky	Israel	2:59.08	
	4	Nelson Crispín	Colombia		DSQ
