= Swimming at the 2020 Summer Paralympics – Men's 200 metre individual medley SM6 =

Men's 200 metre individual medley SM6 at the XVI Paralympic Games
- Venue: Tokyo Aquatics Centre
- Dates: 26 August 2021
- Competitors: 17 from 12 nations

Medalists
1st place, gold medalist(s)		Nelson Crispín	Colombia
2nd place, silver medalist(s)		Andrei Granichka	RPC
3rd place, bronze medalist(s)		Jia Hongguang	China

The Men's 200 metre individual medley S6 event at the 2020 Paralympic Games took place on 26 August 2021, at the Tokyo Aquatics Centre.

== Heats ==
The swimmers with the top 8 times, regardless of heat, advanced to the final.

Rank	Heat	Lane	Name	Nationality	Time	Notes
1	3	5	Nelson Crispín	Colombia	2:43.07	Q
2	2	4	Andrei Granichka	RPC	2:45.95	Q
3	2	5	Jia Hongguang	China	2:48.28	Q
4	1	5	Juan Gutierrez Bermudez	Mexico	2:48.70	Q
5	1	4	Yang Hong	China	2:49.49	Q
6	2	3	Talisson Glock	Brazil	2:49.49	Q
7	3	3	Zach Shattuck	United States	2:49.50	Q
8	3	4	Wang Jingang	China	2:50.23	Q
9	1	3	Bence Ivan	Hungary	2:52.46	
10	3	6	Raul Gutierrez Bermudez	Mexico	2:56.50	
11	2	6	David Sanchez Sierra	Spain	2:55.76	
12	1	6	Panagiotis Christakis	Greece	2:56.75	
13	1	2	William Perry	Great Britain	3:01.50	
14	3	2	Iurii Luchkin	RPC	3:04.44	
15	2	2	Leo McCrea	Switzerland	3:10.28	
16	3	7	Roberto Alcalde Rodriguez	Brazil	3:14.69	
17	2	7	Gary Bejino	Philippines	3:17.19	

== Final ==
200m individual medley final
Rank	Lane	Name	Nationality	Time	Notes
1st place, gold medalist(s)	4	Nelson Crispín	Colombia	2:38.12	WR
2nd place, silver medalist(s)	5	Andrei Granichka	RPC	2:40.92	
3rd place, bronze medalist(s)	3	Jia Hongguang	China	2:41.29	
4	2	Yang Hong	China	2:41.34	
5	8	Wang Jingang	China	2:43.74	
6	7	Talisson Glock	Brazil	2:45.17	
7	6	Juan Gutierrez Bermudez	Mexico	2:48.79	
8	1	Zach Shattuck	United States	2:52.52	
