= Athletics at the 2018 Commonwealth Games – Women's 100 metres (T38) =

Women's 100 metres (T38) at the 2018 Commonwealth Games
- Venue: Carrara Stadium
- Dates: 12 April
- Competitors: 6 from 3 nations
- Winning time: 12.46 GR

Medalists
gold medal	Sophie Hahn	England
silver medal	Rhiannon Clarke	Australia
bronze medal	Olivia Breen	Wales

The women's 100 metres (T38) at the 2018 Commonwealth Games, as part of the athletics programme, took place in the Carrara Stadium on 12 April 2018. The event was open to para-sport athletes competing under the T37 / T38 classifications.

== Records ==
Prior to this competition, the existing world and Games records were as follows:

World record	Georgina Hermitage (GBR)	13.13 (T37)	Rio de Janeiro, Brazil	9 September 2016
World record	Sophie Hahn (GBR)	12.44 (T38)	London, United Kingdom	22 July 2017
Games record	Lisa McIntosh (AUS)	14.38 (T38)	Melbourne, Australia	20 March 2006

== Schedule ==
The schedule was as follows:

Date	Time	Round
Thursday 12 April 2018	20:05	Final

All times are Australian Eastern Standard Time (UTC+10)

== Results ==
With six entrants, the event was held as a straight final.

=== Final ===
Rank	Lane	Name	Sport Class	Reaction Time	Result	Notes
1st place, gold medalist(s)	5	Sophie Hahn (ENG)	T38	0.186	12.46	GR
2nd place, silver medalist(s)	6	Rhiannon Clarke (AUS)	T38	0.136	13.17	AR
3rd place, bronze medalist(s)	3	Olivia Breen (WAL)	T38	0.262	13.35	
4	7	Ella Pardy (AUS)	T38	0.260	13.48	SB
5	8	Erin Cleaver (AUS)	T38	0.163	14.43	
6	4	Katrina Hart (ENG)	T37	0.210	14.82	SB
					Wind: +0.9 m/s	
