= Colombia at the 2020 Summer Paralympics =

- Flag of Colombia
- IPC code: COL
- NPC: Colombian Paralympic Committee
- Website: www.cpc.org.co (in Spanish)

in Tokyo, Japan August 24, 2021 – September 5, 2021
- Competitors: 61 in 9 sports
- Flag bearers: Érica Castaño & Francisco Palomeque
- Medals Ranked 37th: Gold 3 Silver 7 Bronze 14 Total 24

Summer Paralympics appearances (overview)
- 1976; 1980; 1984; 1988; 1992; 1996; 2000; 2004; 2008; 2012; 2016; 2020; 2024

Colombia competed at the 2020 Summer Paralympics in Tokyo, Japan, from 24 August to 5 September 2021.

== Medalists ==
Medal	Name	Sport	Event	Date
Gold	Nelson Crispín	Swimming	Men's 200 metre individual medley SM6	26 August
Gold	José Lemos	Athletics	Men's javelin throw F38	27 August
Gold	Carlos Serrano Zárate	Swimming	Men's 100 metre breaststroke SB7	1 September
Silver	Mayerli Buitrago Ariza	Athletics	Women's shot put F41	27 August
Silver	Nelson Crispín	Swimming	Men's 100 metre breaststroke SB6	28 August
Silver	Darian Faisury Jiménez	Athletics	Women's 100 metres T38	28 August
Silver	Moisés Fuentes	Swimming	Men's 100 metre breaststroke SB4	29 August
Silver	Carlos Serrano Zárate	Swimming	Men's 50 metre freestyle S7	31 August
Silver	Mauricio Valencia	Athletics	Men's javelin throw F34	1 September
Silver	Nelson Crispín	Swimming	Men's 100 metre freestyle S6	1 September
Bronze	Luis Fernando Lucumí Villegas	Athletics	Men's javelin throw F38	27 August
Bronze	Diego Germán Dueñas	Cycling	Men's individual pursuit C4	27 August
Bronze	Carlos Serrano Zárate	Swimming	Men's 200 metre individual medley SM7	27 August
Bronze	Angie Pabón	Athletics	Women's 400 metres T11	28 August
Bronze	Fabio Torres	Powerlifting	Men's 97 kg	29 August
Bronze	Jean Carlos Mina Aponzá	Athletics	Men's 100 metres T13	29 August
Bronze	Nelson Crispín	Swimming	Men's 50 metre butterfly S6	30 August
Bronze	Yesenia Restrepo	Athletics	Women's discus throw F11	31 August
Bronze	José Lemos	Athletics	Men's long jump T38	1 September
Bronze	Diego Meneses	Athletics	Men's javelin throw F34	1 September
Bronze	Juan José Betancourt Quiroga	Cycling	Men's road race T1–2	2 September
Bronze	Laura Carolina González Rodríguez	Swimming	Women's 100 metre butterfly S8	3 September
Bronze	Carlos Serrano Zárate	Swimming	Men's 50 metre butterfly S7	3 September
Bronze	Darian Faisury Jiménez	Athletics	Women's 400 metres T38	4 September

== Competitors ==
The following is the list of number of competitors participating in the Games:

Sport	Men	Women	Total
Archery	0	1	1
Athletics	10	9	19
Boccia	2	1	3
Cycling	4	2	6
Powerlifting	3	1	4
Swimming	9	4	13
Table Tennis	1	0	1
Wheelchair Basketball	12	0	12
Wheelchair Tennis	0	2	2
Total	41	20	61

== Archery ==
Colombia entered one female archer to compete.

Athlete	Event	Ranking round		Round of 32	Round of 16	Quarterfinals	Semifinals	Final / BM	
Athlete	Event	Score	Seed	Opposition Score	Opposition Score	Opposition Score	Opposition Score	Opposition Score	Rank
María Daza	Women's individual recurve	559	14	Barantseva (RPC); L 4–6	did not advance				17

== Athletics ==
Nineteen athletes have qualified to compete.

Men's track

Athlete	Event	Heats		Final	
Athlete	Event	Result	Rank	Result	Rank
Yamil Acosta	Men's 100m T12	11.50	11	did not advance	
Yamil Acosta	Men's 400m T12	50.95	6	did not advance	
Buinder Bermúdez	Men's 100m T13	11.36	11	did not advance	
Buinder Bermúdez	Men's 400m T13	49.91	6 Q	49.26	4
Juan Gómez Coa	Men's 100m T38	11.98	12	did not advance	
Dixon Hooker	Men's 400m T38	55.59	8 q	54.04	8
José Lemos	Men's 100m T38	11.43	5 Q	11.53	5
Jean Carlos Mina Aponzá	Men's 100m T13	11.08	7 Q	10.64	Bronze medal

Men's field

Athlete	Event	Final	
Athlete	Event	Result	Rank
Omar Acosta	Men's long jump T36	5.48	6
Juan Gómez Coa	Men's long jump T38	6.27	7
José Lemos	Men's long jump T38	6.78	Bronze medal
José Lemos	Men's javelin throw F38	60.31	Gold medal
Luis Fernando Lucumí Villegas	Men's javelin throw F38	54.63	Bronze medal
Diego Meneses	Men's javelin throw F34	37.11	Bronze medal
Mauricio Valencia	Men's javelin throw F34	37.84	Silver medal
Mauricio Valencia	Men's shot put F34	11.03	5

Women's track

Athlete	Event	Heats		Semifinals		Final	
Athlete	Event	Result	Rank	Result	Rank	Result	Rank
Katty Hurtado	Women's 100m T38	13.74	6	—N/a		did not advance	
Katty Hurtado	Women's 400m T38	1:01.45	2 Q	—N/a		1:01.40	6
Darian Faisury Jiménez	Women's 100m T38	12.54	1 Q	—N/a		12.49	Silver medal
Darian Faisury Jiménez	Women's 400m T38	1:02.20	4 Q	—N/a		1:00.17	Bronze medal
Francy Osorio	Women's 1500m T13	4:55.31	5 q	—N/a		5:05.08	10
Angie Pabón	Women's 100m T11	12.97	2 q	DNS		did not advance	
Angie Pabón	Women's 400m T11	1:04.44	1 Q	58.18	2 q	57.46	Bronze medal

Women's field

Athlete	Event	Final	
Athlete	Event	Result	Rank
Mayerli Buitrago Ariza	Women's shot put F41	9.94	Silver medal
Érica Castaño	Women's discus throw F55	23.98	4
Martha Liliana Hernández Florián	Women's shot put F36	8.31	5
Yesenia Restrepo	Women's discus throw F11	36.11	Bronze medal
Yanive Torres Martinez	Women's javelin throw F54	16.26	4

== Boccia ==
Three Colombian boccia players classified to BC4 events.

Athlete	Event	Group stage					Quarterfinal	Semifinal	Final / BM	
Athlete	Event	Opposition Score	Opposition Score	Opposition Score	Opposition Score	Rank	Opposition Score	Opposition Score	Opposition Score	Rank
Duban Cely	Individual BC4	Chica (COL); L 2–2*	Balcová (SVK); L 2–10	Nicolai (GER); W 5–3	—N/a	3	did not advance			
Leidy Chica	Individual BC4	Cely (COL); W 2*–2	Nicolai (GER); L 1–7	Balcová (SVK); L 4–7	—N/a	4	did not advance			
Euclides Grisales	Individual BC4	Esaki (JPN); W 4–2	Wong (HKG); W 7–3	McGuire (GBR); W 6–0	—N/a	1 Q	Larpyen (THA); L 3–6	did not advance		6
Duban Cely; Leidy Chica; Euclides Grisales	Team BC4	Thailand; L 2–3	Hong Kong; L 2–6	Japan; L 1–7	RPC; L 3–7	did not advance				

== Cycling ==
Colombia sent one male and one female cyclist after successfully getting a slot in the 2018 UCI Nations Ranking Allocation quota for the Americas.

=== Road ===
Colombia entered a squad of six riders (four men and two women) to compete in their respective Paralympic road races.

Athlete	Event	Time	Rank
Alejandro Perea Arango	Men's C1-3 road race	2:17:56	14
Alejandro Perea Arango	Men's C3 time trial	38:25.24	10
Juan José Betancourt Quiroga	Men's T1-2 road race	52:41	Bronze medal
Juan José Betancourt Quiroga	Men's T1-2 time trial	31:15.64	6
Diego Germán Dueñas	Men's C4-5 road race	2:39:26	15
Diego Germán Dueñas	Men's C4 time trial	49:40.45	7
Edwin Fabián Mátiz Ruiz	Men's C4-5 road race	2:33:34	13
Edwin Fabián Mátiz Ruiz	Men's C5 time trial	49:46.14	10
Daniela Munévar	Women's C1-3 road race	1:15:38	8
Daniela Munévar	Women's C1-3 time trial	28:59.26	8
Paula Ossa	Women's C4-5 road race	2:23:49	4
Paula Ossa	Women's C5 time trial	41:39.89	5

=== Track ===
Athlete	Event	Qualification		Final	
Athlete	Event	Time	Rank	Opposition Time	Rank
Alejandro Perea Arango	Men's C3 individual pursuit	3:31.551	6	did not advance	
Alejandro Perea Arango	Men's C1-3 time trial	—N/a		1:11.423	13
Alejandro Perea Arango	Mixed C1-5 team sprint	52.409	7	did not advance	
Diego Germán Dueñas	Men's C4 individual pursuit	4:35.230	3 QB	Grimes (IRL); 4:35.607	Bronze medal
Diego Germán Dueñas	Men's C4-5 time trial	—N/a		1:11.481	18
Edwin Fabián Mátiz Ruiz	Men's C5 individual pursuit	4:39.113	8	did not advance	
Edwin Fabián Mátiz Ruiz	Men's C4-5 time trial	—N/a		1:06.925	12
Edwin Fabián Mátiz Ruiz	Mixed C1-5 team sprint	52.409	7	did not advance	
Daniela Munévar	Women's C1-3 individual pursuit	4:12.080	10	did not advance	
Daniela Munévar	Women's C1-3 time trial	—N/a		45.541	9
Paula Ossa	Women's C5 individual pursuit	4:07.826	6	did not advance	
Paula Ossa	Women's C4-5 time trial	—N/a		39.868	10
Paula Ossa	Mixed C1-5 team sprint	52.409	7	did not advance	

== Powerlifting ==
Colombia entered four powerlifters (three men and one woman) to the 2020 Summer Paralympics.

Athlete	Event	Total lifted	Rank
Francisco Palomeque	Men's 80 kg	200	4
Fabio Torres	Men's 97 kg	221	Bronze medal
Jhon Freddy Castañeda	Men's +107 kg	218	4
Cristina Poblador	Women's 41 kg	92	6

== Swimming ==
Thirteen Colombian swimmers have qualified to compete at the 2020 Summer Paralympics via the 2019 World Para Swimming Championships slot allocation method including Carlos Serrano Zárate who is a defending champion in the 100m breaststroke SB7 & eight athlete qualified via MQS.

Men

Athlete	Event	Heats		Final	
Athlete	Event	Result	Rank	Result	Rank
Nelson Crispín	50 m butterfly S6	31.66	2 Q	31.77	Bronze medal
Nelson Crispín	100 m freestyle S6	1:06.85	3 Q	1:04.82	Silver medal
Nelson Crispín	100 m backstroke S6	1:22.48	10	did not advance	
Nelson Crispín	100 m breaststroke SB6	1:20.22	1 Q	1:20.19	Silver medal
Nelson Crispín	200 m individual medley SM6	2:43.07	1 Q	2:38.12 WR	Gold medal
Nelson Crispín	400 m freestyle S6	5:36.25	10	did not advance	
Moisés Fuentes	100 m breaststroke SB4	1:39.65	2 Q	1:35.86	Silver medal
Daniel Giraldo Correa	50 m freestyle S13	25.62	13	did not advance	
Daniel Giraldo Correa	100 m backstroke S12	—N/a		1:08.40	7
Daniel Giraldo Correa	100 m breaststroke SB12	—N/a		1:14.61	7
Daniel Giraldo Correa	100 m butterfly S12	1:01.77	7 Q	1:02.42	8
Leider Lemus	100 m breaststroke S11	1:17.47	5 Q	1:19.47	6
Leider Lemus	100 m butterfly S11	1:12.19	9	did not advance	
Miguel Ángel Rincón	50 m butterfly S5	42.18	16	did not advance	
Miguel Ángel Rincón	100 m breaststroke SB4	1:47.35	7 Q	1:46.74	7
Miguel Ángel Rincón	200 m freestyle S5	3:03.24	10	did not advance	
Luis Eduardo Rojas	50 m backstroke S1	—N/a		1:37.53	6
Luis Eduardo Rojas	100 m backstroke S1	—N/a		3:39.25	6
Carlos Serrano Zárate	50 m freestyle S7	28.60	6 Q	27.84 =AM	Silver medal
Carlos Serrano Zárate	50 m butterfly S7	30.04	4 Q	29.34	Bronze medal
Carlos Serrano Zárate	100 m breaststroke SB7	—N/a		1:12.01 PR	Gold medal
Carlos Serrano Zárate	200 m individual medley SM7	2:36.11	5 Q	2:31.58	Bronze medal
Brayan Triana	100 m breaststroke S11	1:24.87	8 Q	1:26.16	8
Richard Mateo Vega	50 m backstroke S2	1:14.10	12	Did not advance	
Richard Mateo Vega	100 m backstroke S2	2:38.70	11	Did not advance	
Richard Mateo Vega	200 m freestyle S2	5:21.29	9	did not advance	

Women

Athlete	Event	Heats		Final	
Athlete	Event	Result	Rank	Result	Rank
María Barrera Zapata	50 m freestyle S10	28.57	6 Q	28.70	6
María Barrera Zapata	100 m freestyle S10	1:01.69	4 Q	1:01.38	6
María Barrera Zapata	100 m backstroke S10	1:14.87	10	did not advance	
María Barrera Zapata	100 m butterfly S10	—N/a		1:10.92	7
María Barrera Zapata	400 m freestyle S10	—N/a		4:48.73	5
Laura Carolina González Rodríguez	100 m butterfly S8	—N/a		1:20.93	Bronze medal
Laura Carolina González Rodríguez	200 m individual medley SM8	3:03.23	4 Q	3:03.46	4
Gisell Prada	100 m breaststroke SB7	1:42.59	6 Q	1:41.11	6
Gisell Prada	200 m individual medley SM7	3:31.61	8 Q	3:29.27	7
Sara Vargas Blanco	50 m freestyle S6	33.83	4 Q	33.97	6
Sara Vargas Blanco	50 m butterfly S6	37.80	5 Q	37.33	6
Sara Vargas Blanco	100 m backstroke S6	1:30.23	10	Did not advance	
Sara Vargas Blanco	400 m freestyle S6	5:46.87	9	did not advance	

Mixed

Athletes	Event	Heats		Final	
Athletes	Event	Result	Rank	Result	Rank
Gisell Prada; Miguel Ángel Rincón; Sara Vargas Blanco; Richard Mateo Vega	4×50m freestyle relay 20pts	3:01.49	10	did not advance	

== Table tennis ==
Men

Athlete	Event	Group Stage			Round of 16	Quarterfinals	Semifinals	Final	
Athlete	Event	Opposition Result	Opposition Result	Rank	Opposition Result	Opposition Result	Opposition Result	Opposition Result	Rank
José Vargas	Men's individual class 7	Morales (ESP); L 0−3	Schnake (GER); L 2−3	3	did not advance				

== Wheelchair basketball ==
The men's team qualified after winning the bronze medal at the 2019 Parapan American Games held in Lima, Peru.

The following is the Colombia roster in the men's wheelchair basketball tournament of the 2020 Summer Paralympics.

Colombia men's national wheelchair basketball team - 2020 Summer Paralympics roster
Players
Coaches

No.	Name	Age – Date of birth	Pts.
3	Raul Vega	28 – 14 April 1993	1.0
4	Hector Garces	37 – 10 December 1983	3.5
5	Guillermo Alzate	38 – 29 May 1983	1.5
9	Andres Florez	32 – 10 September 1988	1.0
10	Jose Leep	43 – 15 August 1978	3.0
14	Daniel Diaz	31 – 17 May 1990	4.5
18	Juan Escobar	20 – 23 September 2000	3.5
19	Jhon Hernandez	28 – 7 October 1992	3.5
20	Nelson Sanz	47 – 26 March 1974	4.5
23	Jhoan Vargas	34 – 4 May 1987	2.0
30	Rodrigo Perez	32 – 13 April 1989	4.0
33	Joymar Granados	26 – 22 May 1995	2.5

Head coach

Lucia Do Nascimento Cardoso Ana

Assistant coach(es)

Alfonso Well de Las Salas Elkin

Legend

- Age - describes age on 24 August 2021

Group A

Pos	Team	Pld	W	L	PF	PA	PD	Pts	Qualification
1	Spain	5	5	0	375	272	+103	10	Quarter-finals
2	Japan (H)	5	4	1	312	298	+14	9	Quarter-finals
3	Turkey	5	3	2	353	327	+26	8	Quarter-finals
4	Canada	5	2	3	307	333	−26	7	Quarter-finals
5	South Korea	5	1	4	305	332	−27	6	9th/10th place playoff
6	Colombia	5	0	5	256	346	−90	5	11th/12th place playoff

Source: TOCOG
Rules for classification: 1) Points; 2) Head-to-head results; 3) Points difference; 4) Points scored.
(H) Hosts

26 August 2021
20:30

Report

Colombia	56–63	Japan
Scoring by quarter: 15–24, 13–12, 15–15, 13–12
Pts: Hernandez 21; Rebs: Diaz, Hernandez 8 Asts: Leep 6		Pts: Akita 24; Rebs: Chokai 17; Asts: Chokai 10

Musashino Forest Sport Plaza
Attendance: 40
Referees: Yap Poh Boon

27 August 2021
14:45

Report

Spain	74–56	Colombia
Scoring by quarter: 18–16, 15–16, 21–18, 20–6
Pts: Ortega 19; Rebs: Zarzuela 11; Asts: García 11		Pts: Diaz 18; Rebs: Hernandez 12; Asts: Leep 7

Ariake Arena
Referees: Tomas Pajer

28 August 2021
20:30

Report

South Korea	66–54	Colombia
Scoring by quarter: 19–10, 16–17, 18–10, 13–17
Pts: Lee C. 14; Rebs: Lee Y. 13; Asts: Oh 11		Pts: Hernandez 21; Rebs: Sanz 8 Asts: Hernandez 9

Musashino Forest Sport Plaza
Attendance: 0
Referees: Hiroki Ono

29 August 2021
11:15

Report

Colombia	38–80	Turkey
Scoring by quarter: 8–15, 13–22, 7–27, 10–16
Pts: Diaz 9 Rebs: Granados 5 Asts: Leep 4		Pts: Gürbulak 19; Rebs: Gümüş, Gürbulak 7 Asts: Gürbulak 11

Musashino Forest Sport Plaza
Referees: Helen Rosenberg

30 August 2021
9:00

Report

Colombia	52–63	Canada
Scoring by quarter: 7–15, 12–20, 18–16, 15–12
Pts: Diaz 18; Rebs: Diaz 11; Asts: Hernandez, Leep, Vargas 5		Pts: Anderson 22; Rebs: Anderson 17; Asts: Anderson, Goncin 8

Ariake Arena
Referees: Hiroki Ono

11th–12th classification match

1 September 2021
9:00

Report

Colombia	70–47	Algeria
Scoring by quarter: 22–11, 11–15, 15–7, 22–14
Pts: Hernandez 28; Rebs: Diaz 13; Asts: Hernandez 9		Pts: Ayache 20; Rebs: Ayache 9 Asts: Zidi 5

Ariake Arena
Referees: Hsieh Shu-fei

== Wheelchair tennis ==
Colombia qualified two players entries for wheelchair tennis. Angélica Bernal qualified by winning the gold medal at the 2019 Parapan American Games in Lima, Peru. Meanwhile, Johana Martinez qualified by world rankings.

Athlete	Event	Round of 64	Round of 32	Round of 16	Quarterfinals	Semifinals	Final / BM	
Athlete	Event	Opposition Result	Opposition Result	Opposition Result	Opposition Result	Opposition Result	Opposition Result	Rank
Angélica Bernal	Women's singles	—N/a	Whiley (GBR); L 6−0, 6−3	did not advance				=17
Johana Martínez	Women's singles	—N/a	Zhenzhen (CHN); L 6−0, 6−0	did not advance				=17

== See also ==
- Colombia at the Paralympics
- Colombia at the 2020 Summer Olympics
