= Swimming at the 2020 Summer Paralympics – Men's 100 metre breaststroke SB6 =

Men's 100 metre breaststroke SB6 at the XVI Paralympic Games
- Venue: Tokyo Aquatics Centre
- Dates: 28 August 2021
- Competitors: 14 from 11 nations

Medalists
1st place, gold medalist(s)		Ievgenii Bogodaiko	Ukraine
2nd place, silver medalist(s)		Nelson Crispín	Colombia
3rd place, bronze medalist(s)		Matthew Levy	Australia

The men's 100 metre breaststroke SB6 event at the 2020 Paralympic Games took place on 28 August 2021, at the Tokyo Aquatics Centre.

== Heats ==
The swimmers with the top eight times, regardless of heat, advanced to the final.

Rank	Heat	Lane	Name	Nationality	Time	Notes
1	2	4	Nelson Crispín	Colombia	1:20.22	Q
2	2	3	Matthew Levy	Australia	1:22.65	Q, OC
3	1	4	Yang Hong	China	1:22.76	Q
4	2	5	Ievgenii Bogodaiko	Ukraine	1:23.45	Q
5	1	5	Tomotaro Nakamura	Japan	1:25.16	Q
6	2	6	Rudy Garcia-Tolson	United States	1:25.41	Q
7	1	6	Jia Hongguang	China	1:25.64	Q
8	1	2	Andrii Trusov	Ukraine	1:25.80	Q
9	1	3	Zach Shattuck	United States	1:26.01	
10	2	1	Pipo Carlomagno	Argentina	1:27.53	
11	1	7	Panagiotis Christakis	Greece	1:27.66	
12	2	2	Juan José Gutierrez	Mexico	1:28.00	
13	2	7	Bence Iván	Hungary	1:28.54	
14	1	1	William Perry	Great Britain	1:30.44	

== Final ==
100m breaststroke final
Rank	Lane	Name	Nationality	Time	Notes
1st place, gold medalist(s)	6	Ievgenii Bogodaiko	Ukraine	1:20.13	
2nd place, silver medalist(s)	4	Nelson Crispín	Colombia	1:20.19	
3rd place, bronze medalist(s)	5	Matthew Levy	Australia	1:21.10	
4	3	Yang Hong	China	1:22.07	
5	1	Jia Hongguang	China	1:23.67	
6	7	Rudy Garcia-Tolson	United States	1:24.64	
7	8	Andrii Trusov	Ukraine	1:24.85	
8	2	Tomotaro Nakamura	Japan	1:25.00	
