= Swimming at the 2014 Commonwealth Games – Men's 200 metre individual medley SM8 =

Men's 200 metre individual medley SM8 at the 2014 Commonwealth Games
- Venue: Tollcross International Swimming Centre
- Dates: 28 July 2014
- Competitors: 5 from 4 nations
- Winning time: 2:22.86

Medalists
gold medal	Oliver Hynd	England
silver medal	Jesse Aungles	Australia
bronze medal	Blake Cochrane	Australia

The men's 200 metre individual medley SM8 event at the 2014 Commonwealth Games as part of the swimming programme took place on 28 July at the Tollcross International Swimming Centre in Glasgow, Scotland.

The medals were presented by Anne Ellis, President of the Commonwealth Games Council for Wales and the quaichs were presented by Prof. Leigh Robinson, Director of Corporate Governance and Compliance, Commonwealth Games Scotland.

== Records ==
Prior to this competition, the existing world and Commonwealth Games records were as follows.

World record	Peter Leek (AUS)	2:20.92	Beijing, China	11 September 2008
Commonwealth record				
Games record	N/A	N/A	N/A	N/A

== Results ==
=== Heats ===
Rank	Heat	Lane	Name	Nationality	Time	Notes
1	1	4	Oliver Hynd	England	2:26.94	Q
2	1	5	Jesse Aungles	Australia	2:31.97	Q
3	1	3	Blake Cochrane	Australia	2:34.83	Q
4	1	6	Sharath Gayakwad	India	2:41.56	Q
5	1	2	Amila Kumarasiri	Sri Lanka	3:22.11	Q

=== Finals ===
Rank	Lane	Name	Nationality	Time	Notes
1st place, gold medalist(s)	4	Oliver Hynd	England	2:22.86	
2nd place, silver medalist(s)	5	Jesse Aungles	Australia	2:31.25	
3rd place, bronze medalist(s)	3	Blake Cochrane	Australia	2:32.72	
4	6	Sharath Gayakwad	India	2:37.17	
5	2	Amila Kumarasiri	Sri Lanka	3:17.10	
