= Athletics at the 2022 Commonwealth Games – Women's 100 metres (T38) =

Women's 100 metres (T38) at the 2022 Commonwealth Games
- Venue: Alexander Stadium
- Dates: 2 August
- Competitors: 12 from 7 nations
- Winning time: 12.83

Medalists
| gold medal | Olivia Breen | Wales |
| silver medal | Sophie Hahn | England |
| bronze medal | Rhiannon Clarke | Australia |

The women's 100 metres (T38) at the 2022 Commonwealth Games, as part of the athletics programme, took place in the Alexander Stadium on 2 August 2022.

== Records ==
Prior to this competition, the existing world and Games records were as follows:

Records T37
| World record | Wen Xiaoyan (CHN) | 13.00 | Tokyo, Japan | 2 September 2021 |
Records T38
| World record | Sophie Hahn (GBR) | 12.38 | Tokyo, Japan | 28 August 2021 |
| Games record | Sophie Hahn (ENG) | 12.46 | Gold Coast, Australia | 12 April 2018 |

== Schedule ==
The schedule was as follows:

| Date | Time | Round |
|---|---|---|
| Tuesday 2 August 2022 | 10:25 | First round |
| Tuesday 2 August 2022 | 19:55 | Final |

All times are British Summer Time (UTC+1)

== Results ==
=== First round ===
First 3 in each heat (Q) and the next 2 fastest (q) advance to the Final

Wind: Heat 1: +0.2 m/s, Heat 2: +0.6 m/s

| Rank | Heat | Lane | Name | Sport class | Result | Notes |
|---|---|---|---|---|---|---|
| 1 | 2 | 5 | Sophie Hahn (ENG) | T38 | 12.80 | Q |
| 2 | 2 | 2 | Olivia Breen (WAL) | T38 | 13.03 | Q |
| 3 | 1 | 5 | Rhiannon Clarke (AUS) | T38 | 13.08 | Q |
| 4 | 1 | 4 | Ali Smith (ENG) | T38 | 13.14 | Q |
| 5 | 1 | 3 | Ella Pardy (AUS) | T38 | 13.26 | Q |
| 6 | 2 | 7 | Hetty Bartlett (ENG) | T38 | 13.38 | Q |
| 7 | 1 | 7 | Sheryl James (RSA) | T37 | 13.53 | q, GR |
| 8 | 2 | 4 | Indiana Cooper (AUS) | T38 | 13.77 | q |
| 9 | 1 | 6 | Natalie Thirsk (CAN) | T38 | 14.03 | |
| 10 | 2 | 3 | Eve Walsh-Dann (NIR) | T38 | 14.04 | |
| 11 | 2 | 6 | Liezel Gouws (RSA) | T37 | 14.57 | |
| 12 | 1 | 2 | Anais Angeline (MRI) | T37 | | |

=== Final ===
The medals were determined in the final.

Wind: +0.6m/s

| Rank | Lane | Name | Sport class | Result | Notes |
|---|---|---|---|---|---|
| 1st place, gold medalist(s) | 5 | Olivia Breen (WAL) | T38 | 12.83 | PB |
| 2nd place, silver medalist(s) | 3 | Sophie Hahn (ENG) | T38 | 13.09 | |
| 3rd place, bronze medalist(s) | 6 | Rhiannon Clarke (AUS) | T38 | 13.13 | |
| 4 | 4 | Ali Smith (ENG) | T38 | 13.30 | |
| 5 | 7 | Ella Pardy (AUS) | T38 | 13.38 | |
| 6 | 8 | Hetty Bartlett (ENG) | T38 | 13.41 | |
| 7 | 1 | Sheryl James (RSA) | T37 | 13.68 | |
| 8 | 2 | Indiana Cooper (AUS) | T38 | 13.88 | |
