= Swimming at the 2018 Commonwealth Games – Men's 200 metre individual medley SM8 =

Men's 200 metre individual medley SM8 at the 2018 Commonwealth Games
- Venue: Gold Coast Aquatic Centre
- Dates: 8 April 2018
- Competitors: 6 from 3 nations
- Winning time: 2:30.77

Medalists
gold medal	Jesse Aungles	Australia
silver medal	Blake Cochrane	Australia
bronze medal	Philippe Vachon	Canada

The Men's 200 metre individual medley SM8 event at the 2018 Commonwealth Games was held on 8 April at the Gold Coast Aquatic Centre.

== Schedule ==
The schedule is as follows:

All times are Australian Eastern Standard Time (UTC+10)

Date	Time	Round
Sunday 8 April 2018	11:12	Qualifying
Sunday 8 April 2018	20:29	Final

== Results ==
=== Heats ===
Rank	Lane	Name	Nationality	Time	Notes
1	4	Jesse Aungles	Australia	2:31.30	Q
2	5	Blake Cochrane	Australia	2:36.43	Q
3	3	Philippe Vachon	Canada	2:38.34	Q
4	2	Celyn Edwards	New Zealand	2:40.28	Q
5	6	Zach Zona	Canada	2:40.81	Q
6	7	Rohan Bright	Australia	2:44.27	Q

=== Final ===
Rank	Lane	Name	Nationality	Time	Notes
1st place, gold medalist(s)	4	Jesse Aungles	Australia	2:30.77	
2nd place, silver medalist(s)	5	Blake Cochrane	Australia	2:32.72	
3rd place, bronze medalist(s)	3	Philippe Vachon	Canada	2:34.03	
4	6	Celyn Edwards	New Zealand	2:35.07	
5	2	Zach Zona	Canada	2:41.66	
6	7	Rohan Bright	Australia	2:42.89	
