= Swimming at the 2015 Parapan American Games – Men's 50 metre freestyle S6 =

Men's 50 metre freestyle S6 at the 2015 Parapan American Games
- Venue: Toronto Pan Am Sports Centre
- Dates: 10 August 2015
- Competitors: 8 from 6 nations
- Winning time: 29.14

Medalists
1st place, gold medalist(s)		Nelson Crispín	Colombia
2nd place, silver medalist(s)		Lorenzo Perez	Cuba
3rd place, bronze medalist(s)		Talisson Glock	Brazil

The men's S6 50 metres freestyle competition of the swimming events at the 2015 Parapan American Games was held on August 10, 2015 at the Toronto Pan Am Sports Centre.

== Schedule ==
All times are Eastern Standard Time (UTC-5).

Date	Time	Round
10 August	17:45	Final

== Results ==
=== Final ===
Rank	Lane	Name	Nationality	Time	Notes
1st place, gold medalist(s)	4	Nelson Crispín	Colombia	29.14	AR
2nd place, silver medalist(s)	5	Lorenzo Perez	Cuba	29.55	
3rd place, bronze medalist(s)	3	Talisson Glock	Brazil	32.78	
4	6	Adriano Gomez	Brazil	33.83	
5	7	Raúl Martínez	Mexico	33.92	
6	1	Christian Daniel	Canada	38.27	
7	8	Roberto Alcalde	Brazil	40.77	
8	2	Zachary Shattuck	United States	DSQ	
