= Jesse Aungles =

Australian Paralympic swimmer (born 1995)

Jesse Aungles OAM
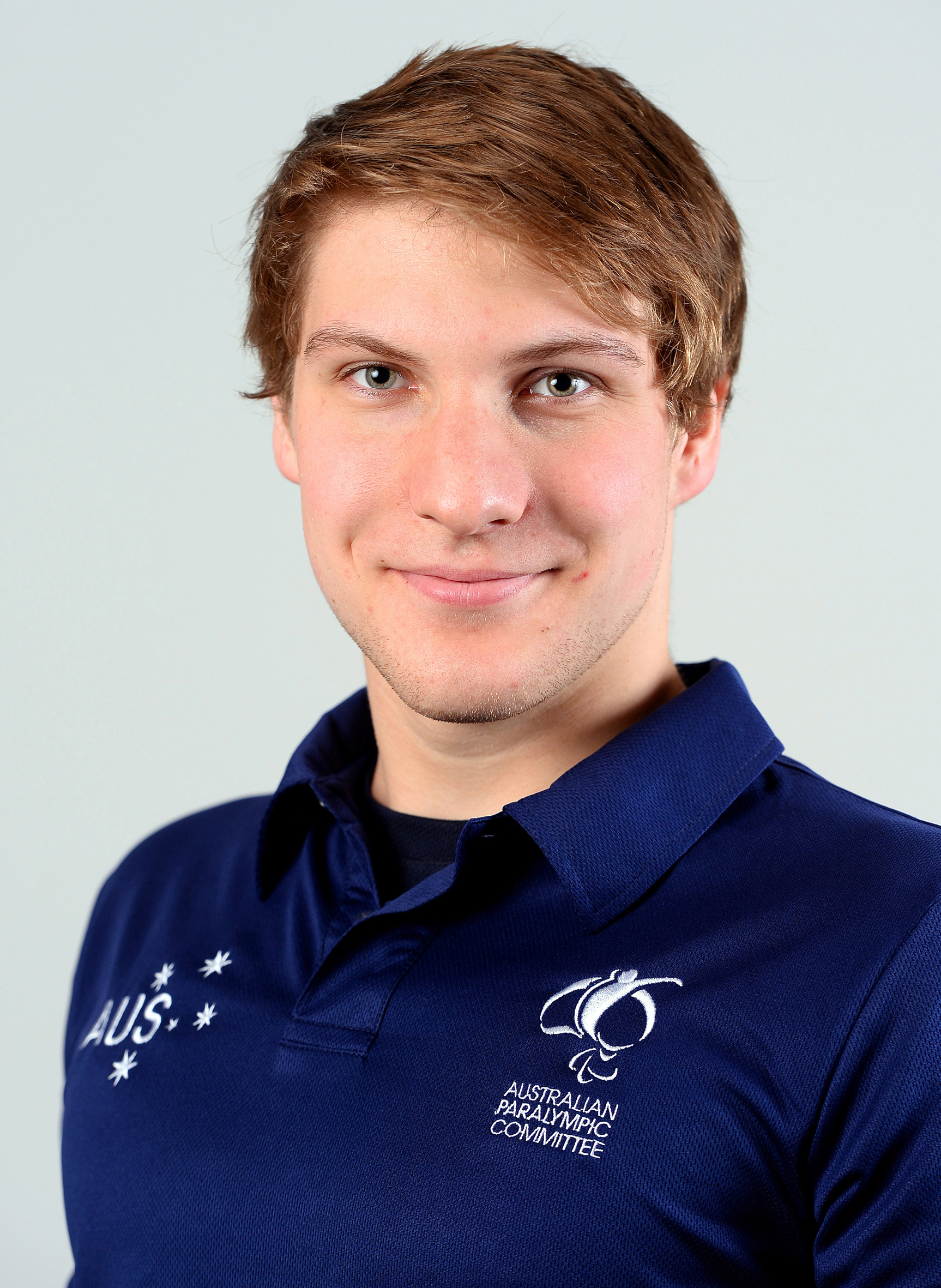
- 2016 Australian Paralympic team portrait

Personal information
- Full name: Jesse Aungles
- Nationality: Australia
- Born: 8 June 1995 (age 31) Adelaide, South Australia

Sport
- Sport: Swimming
- Strokes: Backstroke, Freestyle
- Classifications: S8, SB7, SM8
- Club: Cruiz
- Coach: Laura Brindley
Medal record
Men's Paralympic swimming
Representing Australia
Paralympic Games
Gold medal – first place	2024 Paris	Mixed 4×100 m medley relay 34pts
World Para Swimming Championships
Silver medal – second place	2019 London	100m Backstroke S8
Bronze medal – third place	2019 London	200m Individual Medley SM8
Pan Pacific Championships
Gold medal – first place	2014 Pasadena	100 m butterfly S8
Gold medal – first place	2014 Pasadena	4×100 m medley
Silver medal – second place	2014 Pasadena	200 m medley SM8
Silver medal – second place	2014 Pasadena	4×50 m medley
Bronze medal – third place	2014 Pasadena	400 m freestyle S8
Commonwealth Games
Gold medal – first place	2018 Gold Coast	200 m medley SM8
Silver medal – second place	2014 Glasgow	200 m medley SM8

Jesse Bage Aungles OAM (born 8 June 1995) is an Australian Paralympic swimmer. He represented Australia at the 2016 Rio Paralympics, 2020 Tokyo and the 2024 Paris Paralympics.

== Personal ==
He was born on 8 June in 1995 in Adelaide, South Australia. Aungles right leg was malformed at birth, which meant one femur was 10% shorter than the other and finished at the knee; his left leg was missing the fibula bone, the ankle, and he had only one toe on the foot. His left foot was amputated and his hip reconstructed at age one. He attended Unley High School. He completed a Bachelor of International Relations, Politics and Commerce at the University of Canberra in 2022. In 2024, he is working at the Department of Immigration and Border Protection.

== Career ==
His first swimming competition was at the age of nine. Aungles stated: "I didn't consider myself as having a disability until I was about 10 because I was born that way. But as I got older I could tell people saw me a bit differently and being able to swim has been a way to overcome some of that". Aungles has been inspired by local swimmer and one of Australia's greatest Paralympians Matt Cowdrey.

In April 2014, Aungles won the men's 200 m individual medley SM8 event at the 2014 Australian Swimming Championships in a time of 2:29.54 to qualify for the 2014 Commonwealth Games. Three months later in Glasgow, Aungles won silver in the 200 metre individual medley SM8 event finishing behind the 2012 Olympic champion, England's Oliver Hynd.

At the 2014 Pan Pacific Para Swimming Championships in California, Aungles won two gold, two silver a bronze medal. In the 100 metre butterfly S8, Aungles won gold in 1:05.48. In the 200 m medley SM8, Aungles started strong but was swam down by fellow countryman Blake Cochrane who just out touched Aungles by 0.24 seconds. His bronze came in the 400 metre freestyle S8. In the relays, Aungles with Michael Anderson, Rick Pendleton and Matt Levy won gold in 4 × 100 metre medley finishing over six seconds ahead of the United States and in the 4×50 m medley the team of Aungles, Matthew Haanappel, Ahmed Kelly and Grant Patterson finished second behind Brazil.

At the 2015 IPC Swimming World Championships, Glasgow, Scotland, he finished fourth in the Men's 4 × 100 m Medley Relay 34pts, fifth in the Men's 200m Individual Medley SM8, sixth in the Men's 400m Freestyle S8 and Men's 100m Backstroke S8 and seventh in Men's 100m Butterfly S8.

In 2016, he trained at the National Swimming Centre at the Australian Institute of Sport with coach Yuriy Vdovychenko. He was a South Australian Sports Institute scholarship holder. Aungles represented Australia at the 2016 Rio Paralympics in four different events. He placed eighth in the final of Men's 400m Freestyle S8, seventh in Men's 100m Butterfly S8, seventh in Men's 100m Backstroke and sixth in Men's 200m Individual Medley SM8.

In reflection on competing for Rio, Aungles stated "Getting picked for that team is definitely a confidence boost. I was doubting myself after London trials when I didn't make the podium."

At the 2018 Commonwealth Games, Gold Coast, he won the gold medal in the Men's 200m Individual Medley SM8.

At the 2019 World Para Swimming Championships, London, he won the silver medal in the Men's 100m Backstroke S8 and bronze medal in the Men's 200m Individual Medal SM8.

At the 2020 Tokyo Paralympics, Aungles competed in four events. He came 11th in the 100 m butterfly S8 in his heat and failed to advance to the Final. He qualified for the 200 m individual medley SM8 Final and came seventh with a time of 2:29.48. His best results were in the Men's 100 m Backstroke S8 (time of 1:07.94) and in the Men's 100 m Breaststroke SB7. (time of 1:22.06) He came fourth in both events.

He competed at the 2023 World Para Swimming Championships, Manchester, England, but did not medal. At the 2024 Paris Paralympics. Aungles finished sixth in the Men's 100 m backstroke S8 and won the gold medal in the Mixed 4 x 100 m medley 34 pts.

In 2024, he is being coached by Laura Brindley in Canberra.

== Recognition ==
- 2017 - inducted into Swimming South Australia Hall of Fame.
- 2019 - Swimming Australia Hancock Prospecting Swimmers’ Swimmer Award.
- 2025 - Medal of the Order of Australia (OAM) for service to sport as a gold medallist at the Paris Paralympic Games 2024.
