= Rhiannon Clarke =

Australian Paralympic athlete

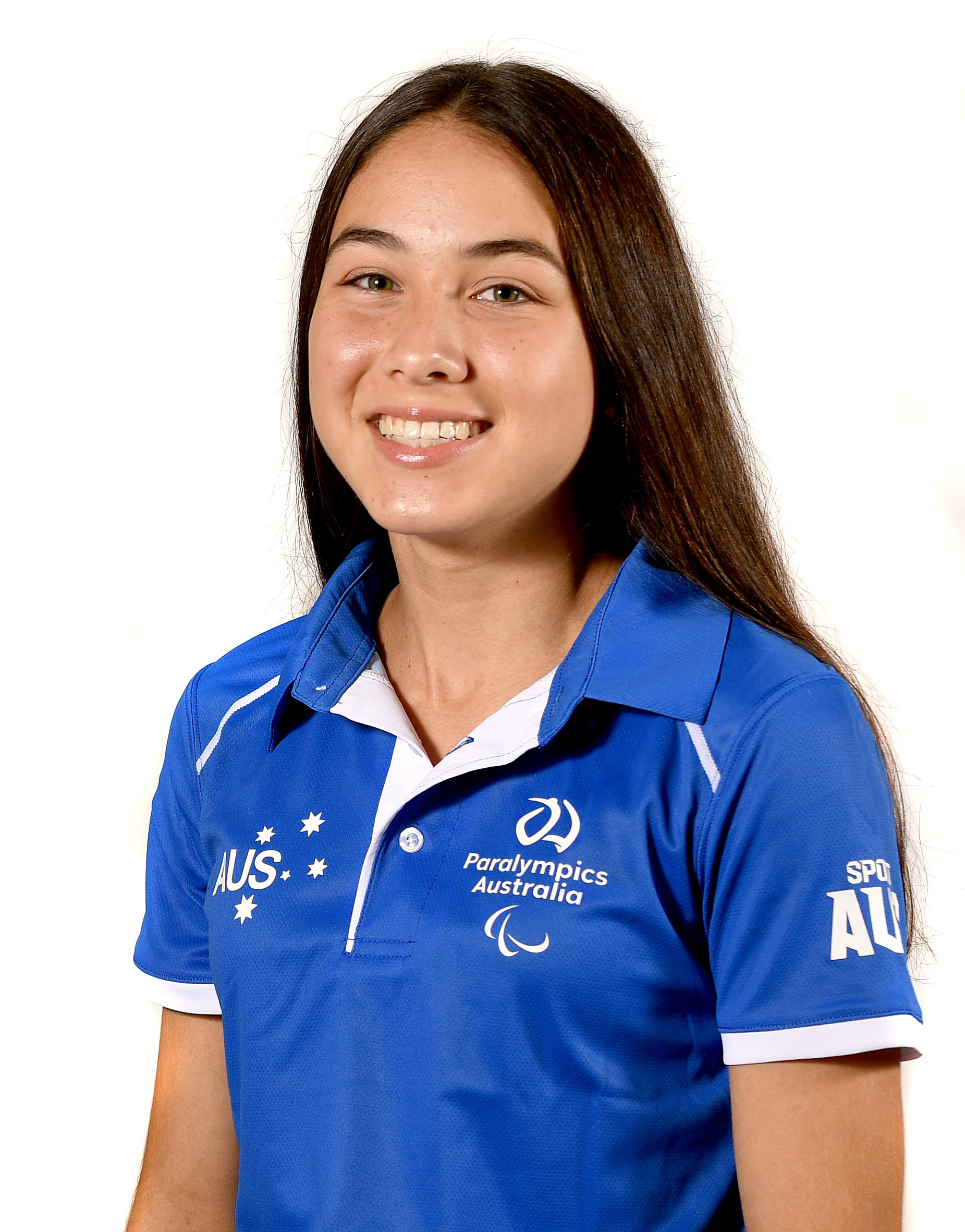
- Rhiannon Clarke in 2019

Personal information
- Nationality: Australian
- Born: 23 July 2002 (age 24) Joondalup, Western Australia

Sport
- Country: Australia
- Sport: Para-athletics
- Coached by: Danny Kevan
Medal record
Women's para-athletics
Representing Australia
World Championships
Silver medal – second place	2023 Paris	400 m T38
Bronze medal – third place	2019 Dubai	100 m T38
Bronze medal – third place	2019 Dubai	200 m T38
Commonwealth Games
Silver medal – second place	2018 Gold Coast	100m T38
Bronze medal – third place	2022 Birmingham	100m T38

Rhiannon Clarke (born 23 July 2002) is an Australian para-athletics competitor who specialises in sprint events. She won two bronze medals at the 2019 World Para Athletics Championships. She represented Australia at the 2020 Tokyo Paralympics and the 2024 Paris Paralympics.

== Personal ==
Clarke was born with cerebral palsy in Joondalup, Western Australia, on 23 July 2002. As of 2018, she attended Mater Dei College in Joondalup. The Australian Olympic Committee awarded Clarke the prestigious Pierre de Coubertin Award in 2018.

== Athletics ==
Clarke started running after a para-come-try day in 2014. She concentrated on sprint events in 2017. As a fifteen-year-old at the 2018 Commonwealth Games, she won the silver medal in the women's 100m T38. At the 2019 World Para Athletics Championships in Dubai, she won bronze medals in the women's 100m and 200m T38.

At the 2020 Tokyo Summer Paralympics held in 2021. Clarke was a finalist in the Women's 100m T38 where she came 5th. She then came 7th in the Women's 400m T38 with a time of 1:02.65 which was an Australian record.

At the 2022 Commonwealth Games, she won the bronze medal in the Women's 100m T38.

Clarke at the 2023 World Para Athletics Championships in Paris, won the silver medal in the Women's 400m T38 and finished fourth in the 100m T38 and 200m T38. At the 2024 Paris Paralympics, she finished fourth in the Women's 100 m T38 and fifth in the Women's 400 m T38, setting Oceania records in both events. At the 2025 World Para Athletics Championships in New Delhi, she finished seventh in the Women's 100 m and fifth in the Women's 400 m T38 finals.
