= Michael Jones (swimmer) =

British Paralympic swimmer

Michael Jones MBE
Personal information
- Nationality: British
- Born: 10 June 1994 (age 32)

Sport
- Sport: Swimming
- Strokes: Freestyle
- Classifications: S7
Medal record
Men's para swimming
Representing Great Britain
Paralympic Games
| Gold medal – first place | 2016 Rio de Janeiro | 400 m freestyle S7 |

Michael "Mikey" Jones (born 10 June 1994) is a British Paralympic swimmer classified as a S7 competitor for swimmers with physical disabilities. Jones competed at the 2016 Summer Paralympics in the 50 metre freestyle, 100 metre freestyle, and won gold in the 400 metre freestyle. He is coached by Mark Rose.

== Early life ==
Michael Jones was born in Poole on 10 June 1994 with spastic diplegia, a type of cerebral palsy that primarily affects his legs. Jones began swimming at age 10, was a member of the New Milton Seagulls swimming club, and attended Mount Kelly School on a swimming scholarship. He attended Ballard School in New Milton, Hampshire before studying at Loughborough University.

== Swimming career ==
After competing in the trials for the 2012 Summer Paralympics, Jones underwent three major surgeries and broke his leg that year.

In preparation for the 2016 Summer Paralympics, Jones began training at the Para-Swimming National Performance Centre in Manchester in September 2015. Despite pulling out of the IPC Swimming European Championships earlier that year due to injury, he competed in Rio de Janeiro in the 50 metre freestyle, 100 metre freestyle, and won gold in the 400 metre freestyle with a time of 4:45.78. Jones swam in the 2018 World Para Swimming European Championships, winning gold in the 400 metre freestyle. He is coached by Mark Rose.

He was appointed Member of the Order of the British Empire (MBE) in the 2017 New Year Honours for services to swimming.
