= Darian Faisury Jiménez =

Colombian Paralympic athlete

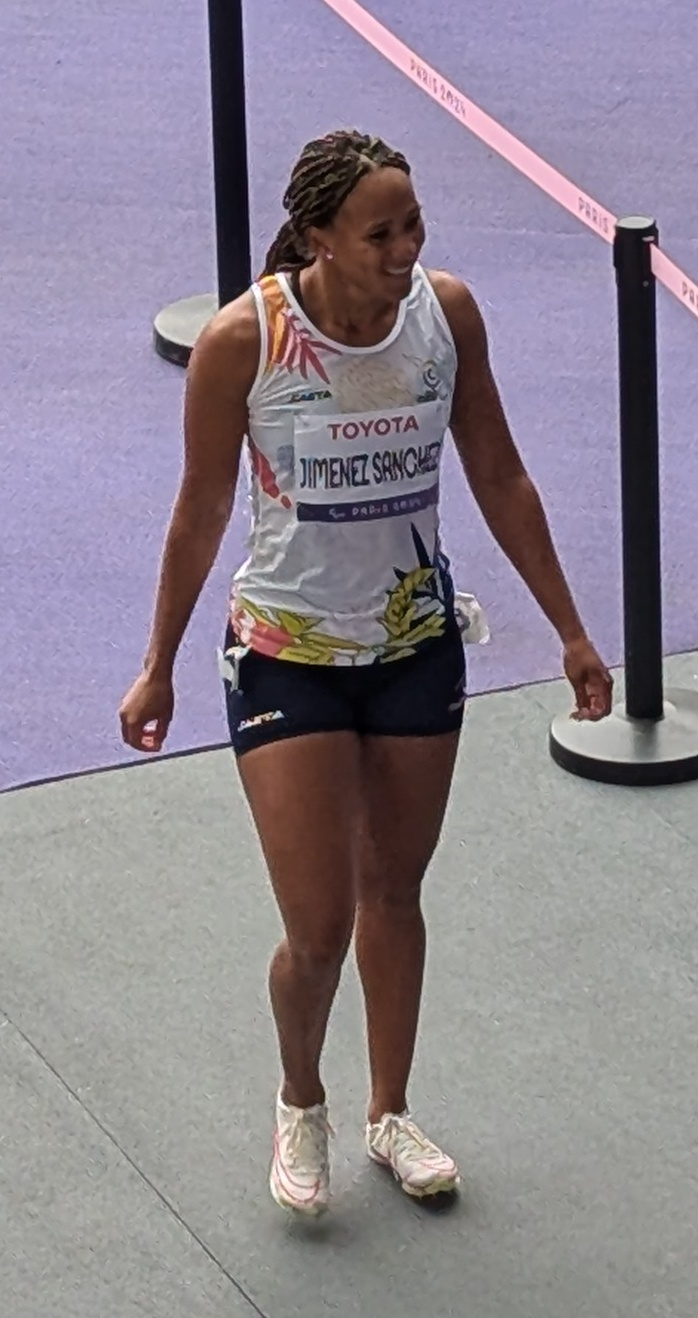
- Jiménez at the 2024 Summer Paralympics

Personal information
- Full name: Darian Faisury Jiménez Sánchez
- Nationality: Colombian
- Born: 6 March 2000 (age 26) Puerto Tejada, Cauca, Colombia

Sport
- Sport: Para-athletics
- Disability: Cerebral palsy
- Disability class: T38
- Events: 100 metres; 200 metres; 400 metres
Medal record
Women's para-athletics
Representing Colombia
Event	1st	2nd	3rd
Paralympic Games	0	1	2
World Championships	1	2	1
Parapan American Games	1	0	0
Total	2	3	3
Paralympic Games
Silver medal – second place	2020 Tokyo	100 m T38
Bronze medal – third place	2020 Tokyo	400 m T38
Bronze medal – third place	2024 Paris	100 m T38
World Championships
Gold medal – first place	2023 Paris	100 m T38
Silver medal – second place	2023 Paris	200 m T38
Silver medal – second place	2024 Kobe	200 m T38
Bronze medal – third place	2024 Kobe	100 m T38
Parapan American Games
Gold medal – first place	2023 Santiago	100 m T38

Darian Faisury Jiménez Sánchez (Note: In this Spanish name, the first or paternal surname is Jiménez and the second or maternal family name is Sánchez.) (born 6 March 2000) is a Colombian Paralympic athlete. She made her first Paralympic appearance representing Colombia at the 2020 Summer Paralympics.

== Career ==
She claimed silver medal in the women's 100m T38 event at the 2020 Summer Paralympics.
