= Athletics at the 2020 Summer Paralympics – Women's 400 metres T38 =

Women's 400 metres T38 at the XVI Paralympic Games
- Venue: Tokyo National Stadium
- Dates: 3 September 2021 (heats); 4 September 2021 (final)
- Competitors: 13 from 10 nations
- Winning time: 1:00.00

Medalists
1st place, gold medalist(s)		Lindy Ave	Germany
2nd place, silver medalist(s)		Margarita Goncharova	RPC
3rd place, bronze medalist(s)		Darian Faisury Jiménez	Colombia

The women's 400 metres T38 event at the 2020 Summer Paralympics in Tokyo, took place between 3 and 4 September 2021.

The T38 category is for ambulant athletes with cerebral palsy. T38 athletes have the mildest form of impairment caused by cerebral palsy, often in only one limb, and not affecting the ability to run, walk or jump freely, although impairing performance. T38 athletes may suffer minor co-ordination difficulties.

== Records ==
Prior to the competition, the existing records were as follows:

World Record	Luca Ekler (HUN)	1:00.27	Bydgoszcz, Poland	5 June 2021
Paralympic Record	Kadeena Cox (GBR)	1:00.71	Rio de Janeiro, Brazil	14 September 2016

Area	Time	Athlete	Nation
Africa	1:03.96	Sonia Mansour	Tunisia
America	1:03.14	Verônica Hipólito	Brazil
Asia	1:01.34	Chen Junfei	China
Europe	1:00.27 WR	Luca Ekler	Hungary
Oceania	1:04.47	Torita Blake	Australia

== Results ==
=== Heats ===
Heat 1 took place on 3 September 2021, at 21:43:

Rank	Lane	Name	Nationality	Time	Notes
1	8	Lindy Ave	Germany	1:01.16	Q, PB
2	2	Katty Hurtado	Colombia	1:01.45	Q, AR
3	4	Luca Ekler	Hungary	1:02.17	Q
4	5	Ali Smith	Great Britain	1:02.68	q, PB
5	7	Sonia Mansour	Tunisia	1:04.73	SB
6	3	Ayumi Takemura	Japan	1:08.29	
7	6	Ericka Violeta Esteban Villatoro	Guatemala	1:13.72	

Heat 2 took place on 3 September 2021, at 21:51:

Rank	Lane	Name	Nationality	Time	Notes
1	8	Darian Faisury Jiménez	Colombia	1:02.20	Q, PB
2	3	Kadeena Cox	Great Britain	1:02.51	Q, SB
3	5	Margarita Goncharova	RPC	1:02.62	Q
4	4	Rhiannon Clarke	Australia	1:02.65	q
5	6	Nele Moos	Germany	1:03.07	
6	7	Yuka Takamatsu	Japan	1:07.23	

=== Final ===
The final took place on 4 September 2021, at 20:38:

Rank	Lane	Name	Nationality	Time	Notes
1st place, gold medalist(s)	5	Lindy Ave	Germany	1:00.00	WR
2nd place, silver medalist(s)	9	Margarita Goncharova	RPC	1:00.14	PB
3rd place, bronze medalist(s)	7	Darian Faisury Jiménez	Colombia	1:00.17	AR
4	8	Kadeena Cox	Great Britain	1:01.16	SB
5	6	Luca Ekler	Hungary	1:01.22	
6	4	Katty Hurtado	Colombia	1:01.40	PB
7	3	Rhiannon Clarke	Australia	1:02.65	AR
8	2	Ali Smith	Great Britain	1:03.05	
