= Lindy Ave =

German Paralympic athlete

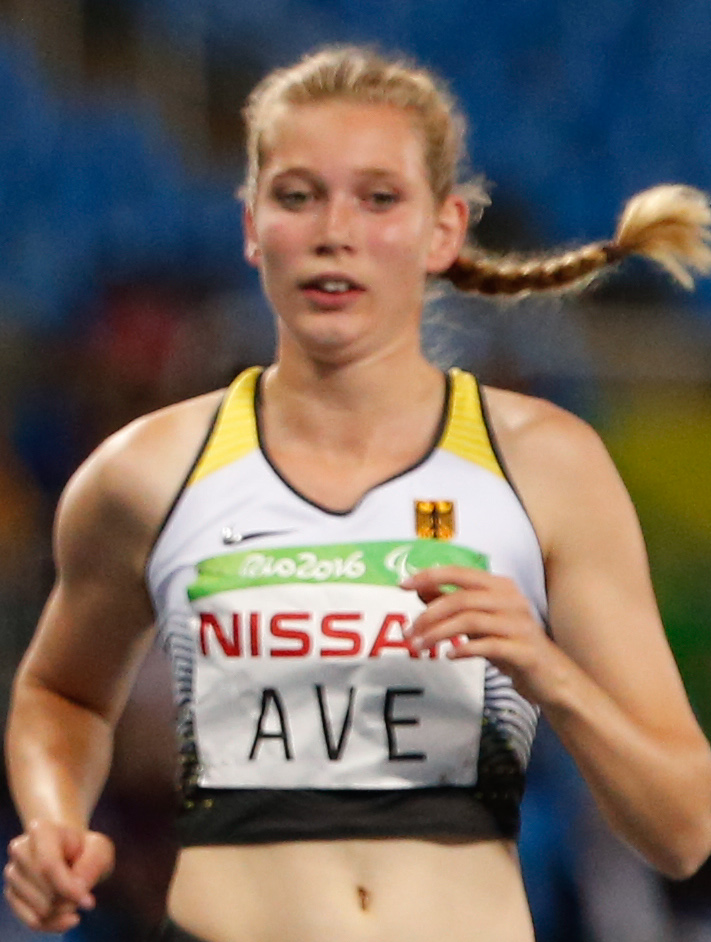
- Lindy Ave at the 2016 Paralympics in Rio de Janeiro

Personal information
- Born: 9 July 1998 (age 28) Neubrandenburg, Germany
- Home town: Greifswald, Germany
- Height: 1.68 m (5 ft 6 in)
- Weight: 53 kg (117 lb)

Sport
- Country: Germany
- Sport: Paralympic athletics
- Disability class: T38, F38
- Events: 100 metres 200 metres 400 metres Long jump
- Club: HSG Uni Greifswald
Medal record
Women's para-athletics
Representing Germany
Paralympic Games
Gold medal – first place	2020 Tokyo	400 m T38
Bronze medal – third place	2020 Tokyo	100 m T38
Bronze medal – third place	2024 Paris	400 m T38
World Championships
Silver medal – second place	2017 London	200m T38
Silver medal – second place	2024 Kobe	400m T38
Bronze medal – third place	2017 London	100m T38
Bronze medal – third place	2025 New Delhi	400m T38
European Championships
Gold medal – first place	2018 Berlin	400m T38
Silver medal – second place	2018 Berlin	100m T38
Silver medal – second place	2018 Berlin	200m T38
Silver medal – second place	2018 Berlin	Long jump T38

Lindy Ave (born 9 July 1998) is a German Paralympic athlete who competes in sprinting and long jump in international level events.
