= Swimming at the 2020 Summer Paralympics – Men's 100 metre breaststroke SB7 =

Men's 100 metre breaststroke SB7 at the XVI Paralympic Games
- Venue: Tokyo Aquatics Centre
- Dates: 1 September 2020
- Competitors: 7 from 6 nations

Medalists
1st place, gold medalist(s)		Carlos Serrano Zárate	Colombia
2nd place, silver medalist(s)		Egor Efrosinin	RPC
3rd place, bronze medalist(s)		Blake Cochrane	Australia

The men's 100 metre breaststroke SB7 event at the 2020 Paralympic Games took place on 1 September 2020, at the Tokyo Aquatics Centre. The event consisted of a straight final, with no heats.

== Final ==
The final was held on 1 September 2021.

Rank	Lane	Name	Nationality	Time	Notes
1st place, gold medalist(s)	4	Carlos Serrano Zárate	Colombia	1:12.01	PR
2nd place, silver medalist(s)	5	Egor Efrosinin	RPC	1:16.43	
3rd place, bronze medalist(s)	3	Blake Cochrane	Australia	1:16.97	
4	2	Jesse Aungles	Australia	1:22.06	
5	6	Christian Sadie	South Africa	1:24.49	
6	7	Ericsson Alejandro Bermudez Sosa	Venezuela	1:27.83	
	2	Suyash Jadhav	India	DSQ	
