= Athletics at the 2020 Summer Paralympics – Women's 100 metres T38 =

Women's 100 metres T38 at the XVI Paralympic Games
- Venue: Japan National Stadium
- Dates: 28 August 2021 (final)
- Competitors: 13 from 8 nations
- Winning time: 12.43

Medalists
1st place, gold medalist(s)		Sophie Hahn	Great Britain
2nd place, silver medalist(s)		Darian Faisury Jiménez	Colombia
3rd place, bronze medalist(s)		Lindy Ave	Germany

The women's 100 metres T38 event at the 2020 Summer Paralympics in Tokyo will take place on 28 August 2021.

The T38 category is for ambulant athletes with cerebral palsy. T38 athletes have the mildest form of impairment caused by cerebral palsy, often in only one limb, and not affecting the ability to run, walk or jump freely, although impairing performance. T38 athletes may suffer minor co-ordination difficulties.

== Records ==
Prior to the competition, the existing records were as follows:

World Record	Sophie Hahn (GBR)	12.38	Dubai, United Arab Emirates	12 November 2019
Paralympic Record	Sophie Hahn (GBR)	12.62	Rio de Janeiro, Brazil	9 September 2016

Area	Time	Athlete	Nation
Africa	13.65	Sonia Mansour	Tunisia
America	12.84	Verônica Hipólito	Brazil
Asia	12.97	Chen Junfei	China
Europe	12.38 WR	Sophie Hahn	Great Britain
Oceania	12.94	Rhiannon Clarke	Australia

== Results ==
=== Heats ===
Heat 1 took place on 28 August 2021, at 10:38:

Rank	Lane	Name	Nationality	Time	Notes
1	7	Darian Faisury Jiménez	Colombia	12.54	Q, PR
2	8	Lindy Ave	Germany	12.87	Q, PB
3	3	Luca Ekler	Hungary	12.94	Q
4	6	Olivia Breen	Great Britain	13.15	q
5	5	Ella Pardy	Australia	13.15	q, SB
6	4	Yuka Takamatsu	Japan	14.00	

Heat 2 took place on 28 August 2021, at 10:38:

Rank	Lane	Name	Nationality	Time	Notes
1	4	Sophie Hahn	Great Britain	12.38	Q, =WR
2	5	Rhiannon Clarke	Australia	13.10	Q, SB
3	7	Ali Smith	Great Britain	13.19	Q, PB
4	2	Margarita Goncharova	RPC	13.20	
5	3	Nele Moos	Germany	13.58	PB
6	8	Katty Hurtado	Colombia	13.74	PB
7	6	Jahmaris Nesbitt	Virgin Islands	17.14	PB

=== Final ===
The final took place on 28 August 2021, at 20:01:

Rank	Lane	Name	Nationality	Time	Notes
1st place, gold medalist(s)	6	Sophie Hahn	Great Britain	12.43	
2nd place, silver medalist(s)	5	Darian Faisury Jiménez	Colombia	12.49	AR
3rd place, bronze medalist(s)	7	Lindy Ave	Germany	12.77	PB
4	9	Luca Ekler	Hungary	12.82	
5	4	Rhiannon Clarke	Australia	13.08	SB
6	3	Olivia Breen	Great Britain	13.13	
7	2	Ella Pardy	Australia	13.14	SB
8	8	Ali Smith	Great Britain	13.24	
