= Andrei Granichka =

Russian Paralympic swimmer (born 1997)

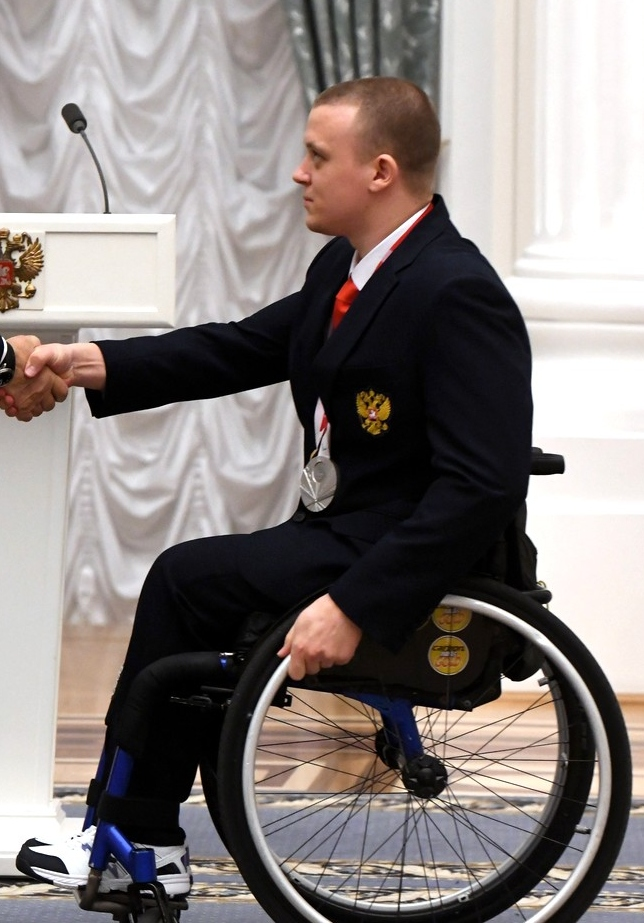
- Granichka in 2021

Personal information
- Full name: Andrei Yureyevich Granichka
- Nationality: Russian
- Born: 18 January 1997 (age 29) Sevastopol, Ukraine
- Education: Sevastopol Institute of Economics and Humanities

Sport
- Sport: Paralympic swimming
- Disability class: S6
- Club: Invasport Adaptive Sports Centre
- Coached by: Irina Mashchenko
Medal record
Paralympic swimming
Representing RPC
Paralympic Games
Gold medal – first place	2020 Tokyo	100 m breaststroke SB5
Silver medal – second place	2020 Tokyo	200 m ind. medley SM6
Representing Neutral Paralympic Athletes
World Championships
Gold medal – first place	2025 Singapore	100 m breaststroke SB5
Bronze medal – third place	2025 Singapore	400 m freestyle S6
European Championships
Gold medal – first place	2024 Funchal	200 m ind. medley SM6
Silver medal – second place	2024 Funchal	400 m freestyle S6
Silver medal – second place	2024 Funchal	100 m breaststroke SB5
Bronze medal – third place	2024 Funchal	50 m butterfly S6
Representing Russia
European Championships
Gold medal – first place	2026 Kocaeli	200 m ind. medley SM6
Silver medal – second place	2026 Kocaeli	400 m freestyle S6

Andrei Yureyevich Granichka (Russian: Андрей Юрьевич Граничка; born 18 January 1997) is a Russian Paralympic swimmer who represented Russian Paralympic Committee athletes at the 2020 Summer Paralympics.

== Career ==
Granichka represented Russian Paralympic Committee athletes at the 2020 Summer Paralympics where he won a gold medal in the men's 100 metre backstroke SB5 and a silver medal in the men's 200 metre individual medley SM6.
