= Ella Pardy =

Australian Paralympic athlete

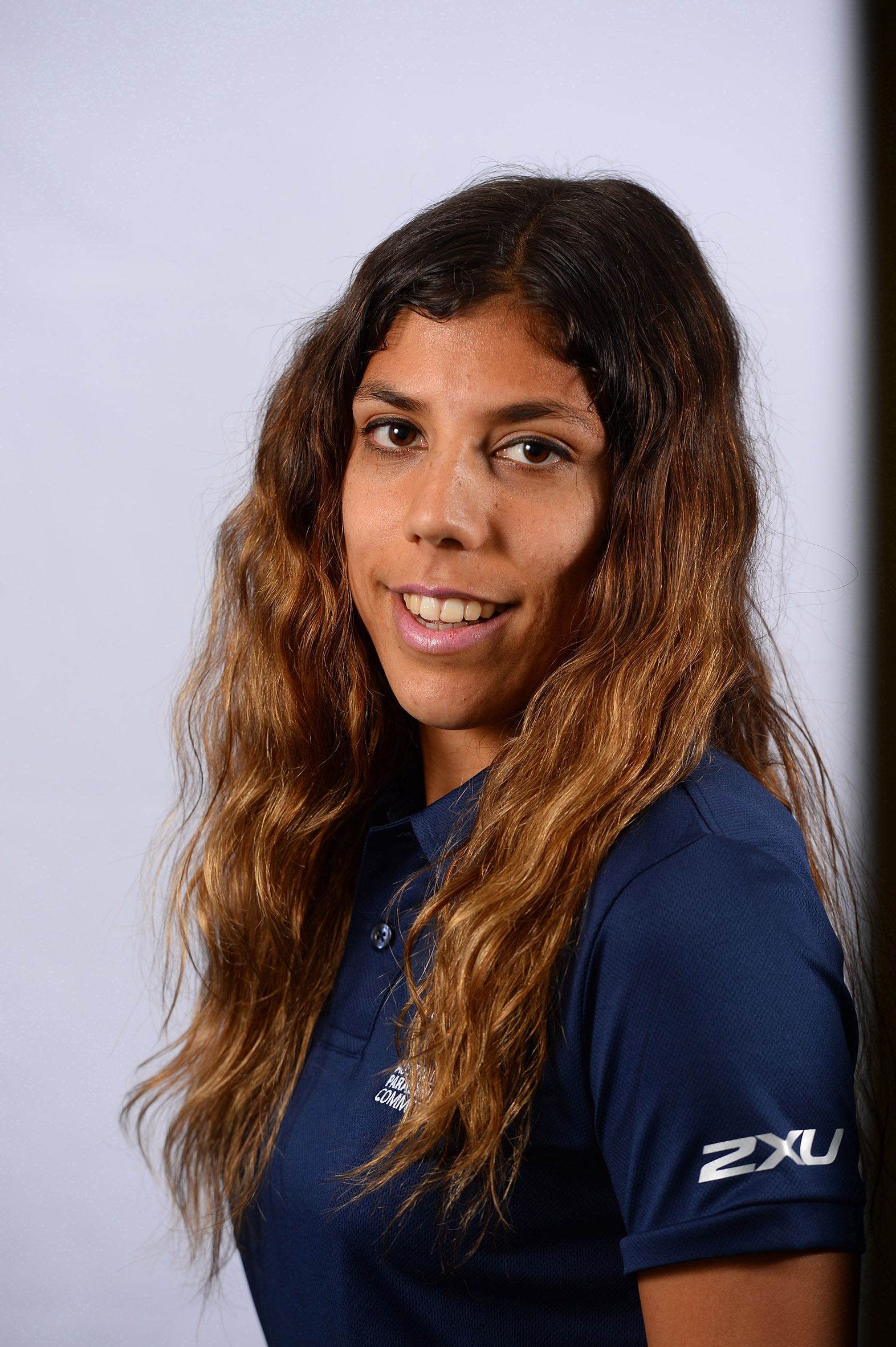
- 2016 Australian Paralympic team portrait

Personal information
- Nationality: Australian
- Born: 22 December 1990 (age 35) Roehampton, London, England
- Height: 1.71 m (5 ft 7 in)
- Weight: 55 kg (121 lb)

Sport
- Country: Australia
- Sport: Para-athletics
- Disability class: T38
- Events: 100 metres; 200 metres; Long jump
- Club: University of Western Australia Athletics Club
- Coached by: Danny Kevan
Medal record
Women's para-athletics
Representing Australia
Paralympic Games
Bronze medal – third place	2016 Rio	4×100 m relay - T35-38

Ella Azura Pardy (born 22 December 1990) is an Australian Paralympic athlete who competes in the T38 100m, 200m and long jump. She represented Australia at the 2016 Rio Paralympics in athletics where she won a bronze medal and the 2020 Toykor Paralympics and the 2024 Paris Paralympics

== Personal ==
Pardy was born in Roehampton, London, England on 22 December 1990. She has autism and cerebral palsy. She trains at the Western Australian Institute of Sport in Perth.

== Sporting career ==
Pardy began participating in sport in attempt to 'wear herself out'. She then became actively involved in ice skating, basketball, swimming, horse riding and athletics. In 2009 and 2011 Pardy represented Australia at the Inas Global Games for para athletes with an intellectual disability. These games were used to determine the athletes classification for the International Paralympic Committee. Pardy was then reclassified and this allowed her compete for qualification to represent Australia at the Commonwealth Games, World Championships and Paralympic Games. She was then added to the National Athlete Support Structure at the international level.

In 2013, she broke her ankle. However, after recovering from the injury she competed on the 100m in 13.16 seconds, 0.06 seconds off the world record.

Pardy represented Australia at the 2014 Commonwealth Games in Glasgow in the T37/38 long jump, jumping a distance of 3.62m. In 2015, Pardy has competed in the 200m at the Western Australia Championships running the third fastest time ever for the T37/38 event. At the 2015 IPC Grand Prix held in Brisbane Pardy, won gold in the 100m.

At the 2015 IPC Athletics World Championships in Doha, she finished fifth in both the Women's 100m and 200m T38 events. Pardy was coached by Sebastian Kuzminski and national coach Iryna Dvoskina. Her ambition was to compete at a Paralympic Games.

At the 2016 Rio Paralympics, she finished sixth in the Women's T38 100 m and won a bronze as a member of the Women's 4 × 100 m T35-38.

At the 2017 World Para Athletics Championships in London, she finished sixth in the Women's 100m T38 and fifth in the Women's 200m T38.

At the 2019 World Para Athletics Championships in Dubai, she finished fifth in the Women's 100m T38 and the Women's 200m T38.

Pardy competed at the 2020 Tokyo Paralympics, her second Paralympics. She qualified for the final and managed to finish seventh in the Women's 100m T38.

At the 2022 Commonwealth Games, she finished 5th in the women's 100m T38. Pardy finished fifth in the Women's 100m and 200m T38 events at the 2023 World Para Athletics Championships in Paris Pardy finished sixth Women's 100m T38 event at the 2024 World Para Athletics Championships in Kobe.

At the 2024 Paris Paralympics, she competed in the Women's 100 metres T38 but did not qualify for the final.

She is coached by Danny Kevan.

== Recognition ==
In 2014, Pardy received the Captain's Trophy Award from the University of Western Australia Athletics Club.
