= Blake Cochrane =

Australian Paralympic swimmer (born 1991)

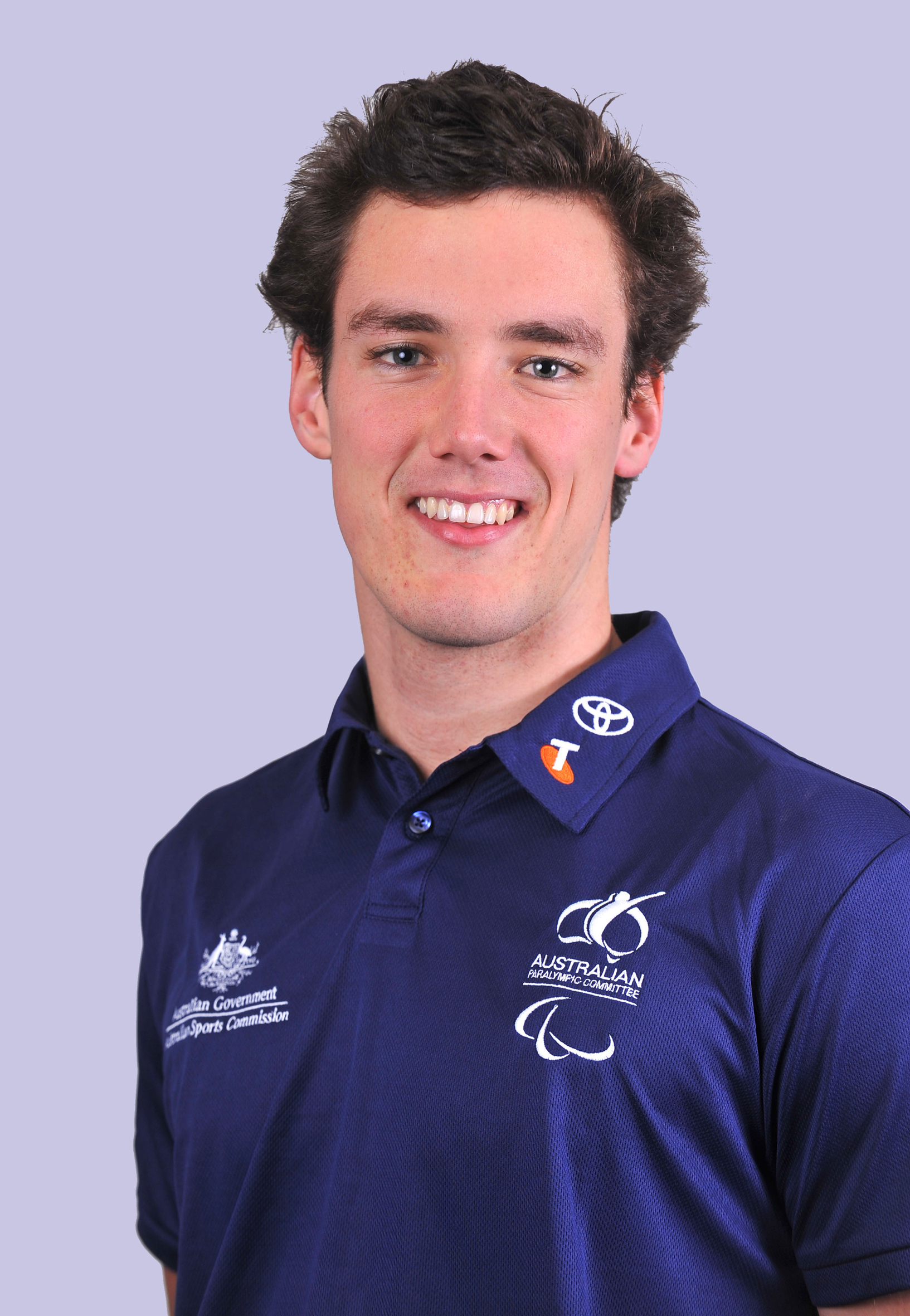
- 2012 Australian Paralympic team portrait of Cochrane

Personal information
- Full name: Blake Cochrane
- Nationality: Australian
- Born: 25 January 1991 (age 35) Charleville, Queensland, Australia

Sport
- Sport: Swimming
- Strokes: breaststroke, freestyle
- Classifications: S8, SB7, SM8
- Club: USC Spartans
- Coach: Nathan Doyle
Medal record
Men's paralympic swimming
Representing Australia
Paralympic Games
Gold medal – first place	2012 London	100 m breaststroke SB7
Gold medal – first place	2012 London	4×100 m freestyle
Silver medal – second place	2008 Beijing	100 m breaststroke SB7
Silver medal – second place	2016 Rio de Janeiro	100 m breaststroke SB7
Silver medal – second place	2020 Tokyo	4×100 m medley 34 pts
Bronze medal – third place	2020 Tokyo	100 m breaststroke SB7
World Championships (LC)
Gold medal – first place	2010 Eindhoven	100 m breaststroke SB7
Gold medal – first place	2013 Montreal	100 m breaststroke SB7
Silver medal – second place	2015 Glasgow	100 m breaststroke SB7
Bronze medal – third place	2015 Glasgow	4×100 m freestyle relay 34 points
Bronze medal – third place	2019 London	100 m breaststroke SB7
Commonwealth Games
Silver medal – second place	2018 Gold Coast	200 m medley SM8
Bronze medal – third place	2010 Delhi	100 m freestyle S8
Bronze medal – third place	2014 Glasgow	200 m medley SM8
Bronze medal – third place	2018 Gold Coast	100m breaststroke SB8
Bronze medal – third place	2022 Birmingham	100m breaststroke SB8

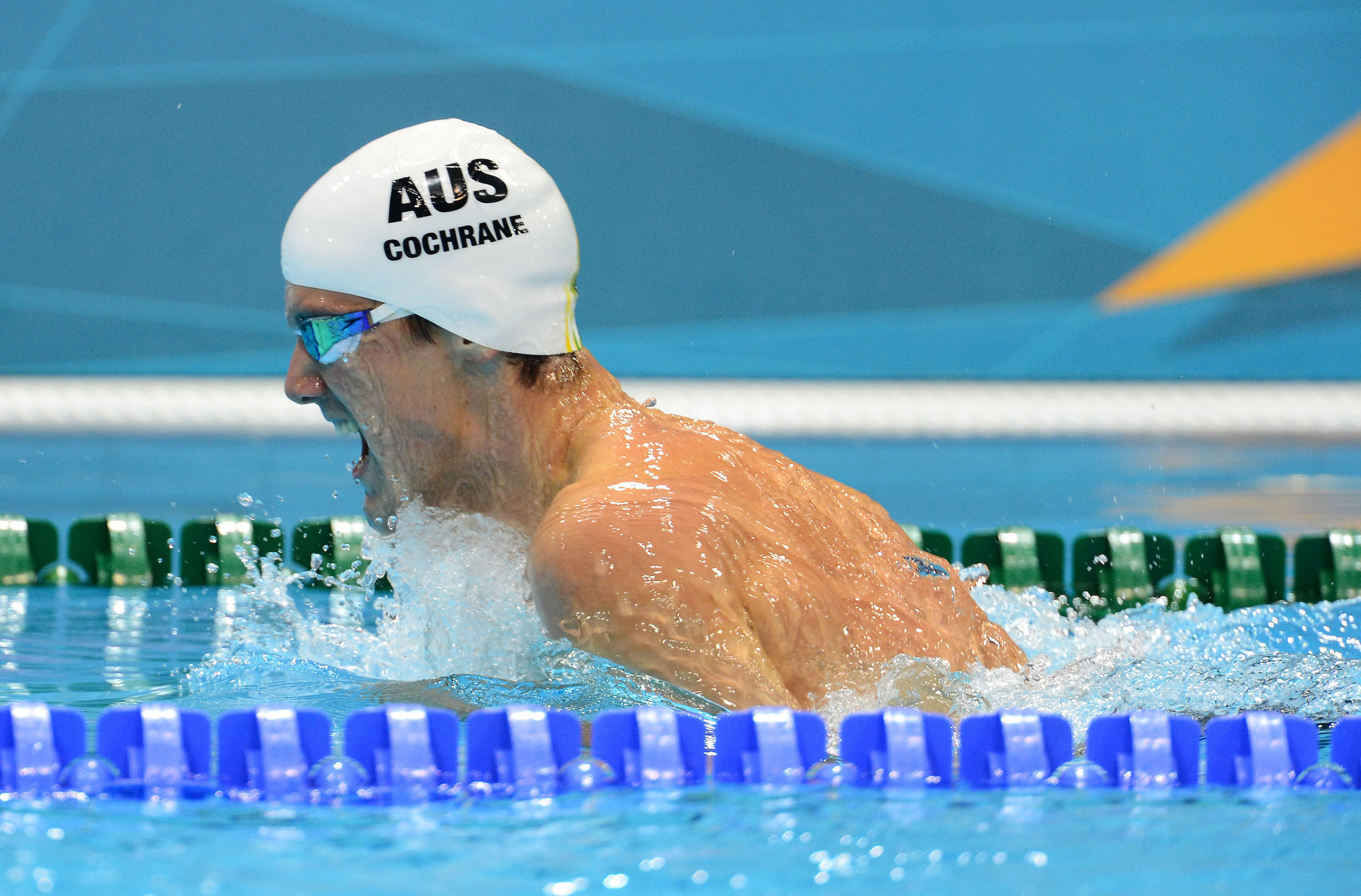
Cochrane at the 2012 London Paralympics

Blake Cochrane, OAM (born 25 January 1991) is a retired Australian Paralympic swimmer. He won a silver medal at the 2008 Beijing Paralympics, two gold medals at the 2012 London Paralympics, a silver medal at the 2016 Rio Paralympics, and a silver and one bronze medal at the 2020 Tokyo Paralympics.

It has been announced that Cochrane will be one of Australia's television hosts for coverage of the Paris Paralympic Games in 2024.

== Personal ==
Blake John Cochrane born on 25 January 1991 in Charleville, Queensland. He has multiple congenital limb deficiencies affecting his hands and his feet. In December 2017, he graduated from University of the Sunshine Coast with Bachelor of Clinical Exercise Science. Cochrane and his wife Lauran have a son and daughter.

Cochrane announced his retirement from swimming in July 2022. In 2025, he was appointed Queensland Academy of Sport Para Unit Lead.

== Swimming ==
Cochrane's parents enrolled him in swimming in an effort to alleviate his asthma. He began swimming competitively at age 16. It was not until his selection by Swimming Australia as an AWD (Athlete with a Disability) team competitor at the Arafura Games in Darwin, 2007, that his potential was realised.

Cochrane went on to win a silver medal at the 2008 Beijing Games in the Men's 100 m Breaststroke SB7 event.

After Beijing 2008, Cochrane continued to perform strongly in the pool. He was one of the stars of the 2009 World Short Course Championships, winning two gold medals and one silver. He has been honoured with Blue awards by both University of Queensland, 2010 and the University of the Sunshine Coast, 2011. He blitzed the field at the 2011 Para Pan Pacific Championships in Canada, winning five gold medals and breaking the world record in the 100m breaststroke. 2010 was an especially prolific year for Blake as he won gold in the 100m breaststroke at the World Championships, before snaring a bronze medal at the Commonwealth Games in Delhi. During the 2012 Australian Swimming Nationals he again set a new world record in the 100m breaststroke (SB8) final. Competing at the 2012 London Games, he competed in five events and won two gold medals in the Men's 100 m Breaststroke SB7 and Men's 4 × 100 m Freestyle 34 points.

At the 2013 IPC Swimming World Championships in Montreal, Quebec, Canada, Cochrane broke the world record in winning the gold medal in the Men's 100 m Breaststroke SB7.

Competing at the 2015 IPC Swimming World Championships in Glasgow, Scotland, Cochrane won the silver medal in the Men's 100 m Breaststroke SB7 and a bronze medal in the Men's 4 × 100 m Freestyle Relay 34 points. He finished fourth in Men's 4 × 100 m Medley Relay 34pts, fifth in the Men's 50m Freestyle S8 and Men's 100m Freestyle S8.

In 2015, Cochrane was coached by Jan Cameron at the University of the Sunshine Coast.

At the 2016 Rio Paralympics, Cochrane won the silver medal in Men's 100 m Breaststroke SB7. He also competed in Men's 4 × 100 m Freestyle (34 points) and finished fifth, seventh in Men's 400m Freestyle S8 but didn't progress to the finals in Men's 50m Freestyle S8 and Men's 100m Freestyle S8.

At the 2019 World Para Swimming Championships in London, Cochrane won the bronze medal in the Men's 100 m Breaststroke SB7.

Cochrane competed at the 2020 Tokyo Paralympics in the Men's 100 m breaststroke SB7. He won the bronze medal with a time of 1:16.97, close to 5 seconds behind the winner Carlos Serrano Zarate of Columbia. He participated in the heats of the 34pts 4 × 100 m Medley but not in the final.

At the 2022 Birmingham Commonwealth Games, he won the bronze medal in the Men's 100 breaststroke SB8.

Cochrane is coached by Nathan Doyle at USC Spartans.

== Recognition ==
In 2011, Cochrane was a nominee for The Age's Sport Performer Award in the Performer with a Disability category. In 2011, he won Swimming Australia's Swimmer with a Disability of the Year Award. He has been awarded the 'Graham Sherman Sunshine Coast Senior Sports Star of the Year' for 2013. He was awarded a Medal of the Order of Australia in the 2014 Australia Day Honours "for service to sport as a Gold Medallist at the London 2012 Paralympic Games."

== See also ==
- Australia at the Paralympics
- Disabled sports
