= Thijs van Hofweegen =

Dutch Paralympic swimmer

Personal information
- Born: 30 November 1996 (age 29)

Sport
- Sport: Swimming
- Classifications: S6
Medal record
Men's para swimming
Representing Netherlands
Paralympic Games
Silver medal – second place	2016 Rio de Janeiro	400 m freestyle S6
Silver medal – second place	2024 Paris	Mixed 4×100 m medley relay 34pts
World Championships
Bronze medal – third place	2022 Madeira	50 m freestyle S6
European Championships
Gold medal – first place	2018 Dublin	50 m freestyle S6
Gold medal – first place	2018 Dublin	100 m freestyle S6
Gold medal – first place	2018 Dublin	400 m freestyle S6
Silver medal – second place	2016 Funchal	100 m freestyle S6
Silver medal – second place	2026 Kocaeli	100 m breaststroke SB6
Bronze medal – third place	2016 Funchal	400 m freestyle S6
Bronze medal – third place	2016 Funchal	100 m backstroke S6
Bronze medal – third place	2018 Dublin	4 x 100 m medley relay

Thijs van Hofweegen (born 30 November 1996) is a Dutch Paralympic swimmer with cerebral palsy. He is a silver medalist at the 2016 Summer Paralympics held in Rio de Janeiro, Brazil and a gold medalist in several events at the 2018 World Para Swimming European Championships held in Dublin, Ireland. He also won the bronze medal in the men's 50 metre freestyle S6 event at the 2022 World Para Swimming Championships held in Madeira.

== Career ==
Van Hofweegen represented the Netherlands at the 2016 Summer Paralympics held in Rio de Janeiro, Brazil and he won the silver medal in the men's 400 metre freestyle S6 event. He also competed in the men's 50 metre freestyle S6 and men's 100 metre freestyle S6 where he respectively finished in 8th and 5th place in the final.

At the 2016 IPC Swimming European Championships held in Funchal, Madeira, he won the silver medal in the men's 100m freestyle S6 event. He also won the bronze medals in the men's 400m freestyle S6 event and in the 100m backstroke S6 event.

At the 2018 World Para Swimming European Championships held in Dublin, Ireland, he won three gold medals: in the men's 50 metres freestyle S6 event, in the men's 100 metres freestyle S6 event, in the men's 400 metres freestyle S6 event. He also won the bronze medal in the 4 x 100 metres medley relay event.

In 2021, Van Hofweegen represented the Netherlands at the 2020 Summer Paralympics held in Tokyo, Japan. He competed in the men's 100 metre backstroke S6 and men's 100 metre freestyle S6 events and in both events he advanced to compete in the final. He also finished in 5th place in the men's 4 × 100 metre medley relay 34pts event.
