= Lorenzo Perez Escalona =

Cuban Paralympic swimmer (born 1986)

Personal information
- Nationality: Cuba
- Born: February 4, 1986 Niquero, Cuba

Sport
- Sport: Swimming
- Strokes: Freestyle
Medal record
Paralympic Games
Gold medal – first place	2016 Rio de Janeiro	100m freestyle S6
Silver medal – second place	2012 London	50m freestyle S6
Bronze medal – third place	2012 London	100m freestyle S6
Bronze medal – third place	2016 Rio de Janeiro	400m freestyle S6
World Championships
Gold medal – first place	2017 Mexico City	100m freestyle S6
Silver medal – second place	2017 Mexico City	50m freestyle S6
Parapan American Games
Gold medal – first place	2011 Guadalajara	50m freestyle S6
Gold medal – first place	2011 Guadalajara	100m freestyle S6
Gold medal – first place	2011 Guadalajara	400m freestyle S6
Gold medal – first place	2015 Toronto	100m freestyle S6
Gold medal – first place	2015 Toronto	400m freestyle S6
Gold medal – first place	2019 Lima	400m freestyle S6
Silver medal – second place	2015 Toronto	50m freestyle S6
Silver medal – second place	2019 Lima	50m freestyle S6
Silver medal – second place	2019 Lima	100m freestyle S6

Lorenzo Perez Escalona (born February 4, 1986) is a Cuban Paralympic swimmer. He competed in the 2012 Paralympic Games in London where he won a silver and a bronze medal for the 50 and 100 m freestyle respectively. Escalona also one a gold medal at the 2015 Parapan American Games in the 100m freestyle. He has also competed in the 400m freestyle.
