= Nelson Crispín =

Colombian Paralympic swimmer

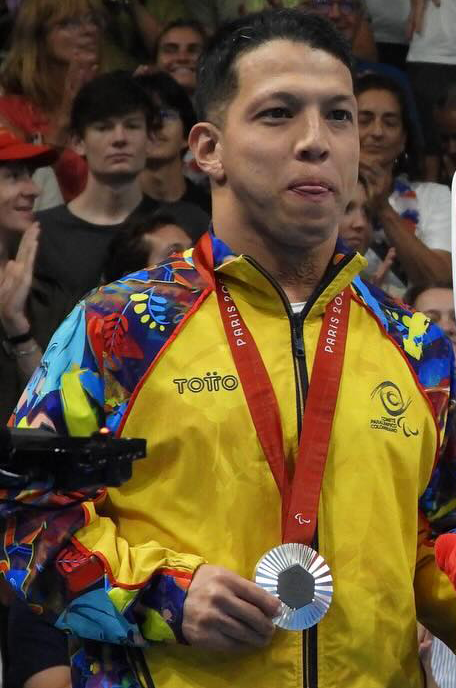
- Crispín at the 2024 Summer Paralympics

Personal information
- Full name: Nelson Crispín Corzo
- Born: 10 May 1992 (age 34) Bucaramanga, Colombia

Sport
- Sport: Swimming
- Classifications: S6, SB6, SM6
Medal record
Representing Colombia
Men's para swimming
Event	1st	2nd	3rd
Paralympic Games	1	8	1
World Championships	14	9	8
Parapan American Games	12	7	4
South American Para Games	1	0	0
Total	28	24	13
Paralympic Games
Gold medal – first place	2020 Tokyo	200 m medley SM6
Silver medal – second place	2016 Rio de Janeiro	50 m freestyle S6
Silver medal – second place	2016 Rio de Janeiro	100 m freestyle S6
Silver medal – second place	2016 Rio de Janeiro	100 m breaststroke SB6
Silver medal – second place	2020 Tokyo	100 m freestyle S6
Silver medal – second place	2020 Tokyo	100 m breaststroke SB6
Silver medal – second place	2024 Paris	50 m butterfly S6
Silver medal – second place	2024 Paris	100 m breaststroke SB6
Silver medal – second place	2024 Paris	200 m medley SM6
Bronze medal – third place	2020 Tokyo	50 m butterfly S6
World Championships
Gold medal – first place	2013 Montreal	100 m freestyle S6
Gold medal – first place	2015 Glasgow	100 m freestyle S6
Gold medal – first place	2017 Mexico City	50 m freestyle S6
Gold medal – first place	2017 Mexico City	50 m butterfly S6
Gold medal – first place	2017 Mexico City	100 m breaststroke SB6
Gold medal – first place	2017 Mexico City	200 m medley SM6
Gold medal – first place	2019 London	50 m freestyle S6
Gold medal – first place	2019 London	100 m freestyle S6
Gold medal – first place	2019 London	100 m breaststroke SB6
Gold medal – first place	2022 Madeira	100 m breaststroke SB6
Gold medal – first place	2022 Madeira	200 m medley SM6
Gold medal – first place	2023 Manchester	200 m medley SM6
Gold medal – first place	2025 Singapore	50 m butterfly S6
Gold medal – first place	2025 Singapore	100 m breaststroke SB6
Silver medal – second place	2013 Montreal	400 m freestyle S6
Silver medal – second place	2015 Glasgow	100 m breaststroke SB6
Silver medal – second place	2015 Glasgow	200 m medley SM6
Silver medal – second place	2017 Mexico City	100 m freestyle S6
Silver medal – second place	2022 Madeira	50 m freestyle S6
Silver medal – second place	2022 Madeira	50 m butterfly S6
Silver medal – second place	2022 Madeira	100 m freestyle S6
Silver medal – second place	2023 Manchester	100 m breaststroke SB6
Silver medal – second place	2025 Singapore	100 m freestyle S6
Bronze medal – third place	2013 Montreal	50 m freestyle S6
Bronze medal – third place	2013 Montreal	50 m butterfly S6
Bronze medal – third place	2013 Montreal	100 m breaststroke SB6
Bronze medal – third place	2019 London	50 m butterfly S6
Bronze medal – third place	2019 London	200 m medley SM6
Bronze medal – third place	2023 Manchester	50 m butterfly S6
Bronze medal – third place	2025 Singapore	50 m freestyle S6
Bronze medal – third place	2025 Singapore	200 m medley SM6
Parapan American Games
Gold medal – first place	2011 Guadalajara	100 m breaststroke SB6
Gold medal – first place	2015 Toronto	50 m freestyle S6
Gold medal – first place	2015 Toronto	50 m butterfly S6
Gold medal – first place	2015 Toronto	100 m breaststroke SB6
Gold medal – first place	2019 Lima	50 m freestyle S6
Gold medal – first place	2019 Lima	50 m butterfly S6
Gold medal – first place	2019 Lima	100 m freestyle S6
Gold medal – first place	2019 Lima	100 m breaststroke SB6
Gold medal – first place	2019 Lima	200 m medley SM6
Gold medal – first place	2023 Santiago	50 m butterfly S6
Gold medal – first place	2023 Santiago	100 m breaststroke SB6
Gold medal – first place	2023 Santiago	200 m medley SM6
Silver medal – second place	2011 Guadalajara	50 m freestyle S6
Silver medal – second place	2011 Guadalajara	50 m butterfly S6
Silver medal – second place	2015 Toronto	100 m freestyle S6
Silver medal – second place	2015 Toronto	200 m medley SM6
Silver medal – second place	2019 Lima	400 m freestyle S6
Silver medal – second place	2023 Santiago	100 m freestyle S6
Silver medal – second place	2023 Santiago	100 m backstroke S6
Bronze medal – third place	2015 Toronto	400 m freestyle S6
Bronze medal – third place	2019 Lima	100 m backstroke S6
Bronze medal – third place	2023 Santiago	4×100 m mixed freestyle relay 34 pts
Bronze medal – third place	2023 Santiago	4×50 m mixed medley relay 20 pts
South American Para Games
Gold medal – first place	2026 Valledupar	100 m breaststroke SB5-SB6

Nelson Crispín Corzo (Note: In this Spanish name, the first or paternal surname is Crispin and the second or maternal family name is Corzo.) (born 10 May 1992) is a Colombian Paralympic swimmer. He represented Colombia at the Summer Paralympic Games in 2012, 2016, 2021 and 2024. He won ten medals in total: one gold medal, eight silver medals and one bronze medal.

== Career ==
In 2016, he won the silver medal in the men's 50 metre freestyle S6, the men's 100 metre freestyle S6 and the men's 100 metre breaststroke SB6 events. He was also the flag bearer in the opening ceremony of the 2016 Summer Paralympics.

He represented Colombia at both the 2015 Parapan American Games and the 2019 Parapan American Games. He also competed at the 2019 World Para Swimming Championships held in London, United Kingdom.
