= Jia Hongguang =

Chinese Paralympic swimmer

Personal information
- Nationality: Chinese
- Born: 6 April 1988 (age 38) Shandong, China

Sport
- Sport: swimming
- Disability class: S6
- Event(s): Freestyle, Breaststroke
- Club: Shandong Province
- Coached by: Li Mengzhong
Medal record
Swimming
Representing China
Paralympic Games
Gold medal – first place	2020 Tokyo	100 m backstroke S6
Gold medal – first place	2020 Tokyo	Mixed 4 × 50 m freestyle relay 20pts
Silver medal – second place	2012 London	100 m backstroke S6
Silver medal – second place	2016 Rio de Janeiro	100 m backstroke S6
Silver medal – second place	2020 Tokyo	50 m butterfly S6
Bronze medal – third place	2020 Tokyo	200 m ind. medley SS6
World Championships
Silver medal – second place	2013 Eindhoven	100 m backstroke S6
Asian Para Games
Silver medal – second place	2022 Hangzhou	100 m backstroke S6
Silver medal – second place	2022 Hangzhou	100 m freestyle S6

Jia Hongguang (born April 6, 1988) is a Chinese Paralympic swimmer competing in the S6.

== Career ==
At the 2012 Summer Paralympics in London he won a silver medal in the 100 m backstroke (S6). He won the silver medal at the Men's 100 metre backstroke S6 event at the 2016 Summer Paralympics with 1:13.42.
