= Oleksandr Komarov (swimmer) =

Ukrainian Paralympic swimmer

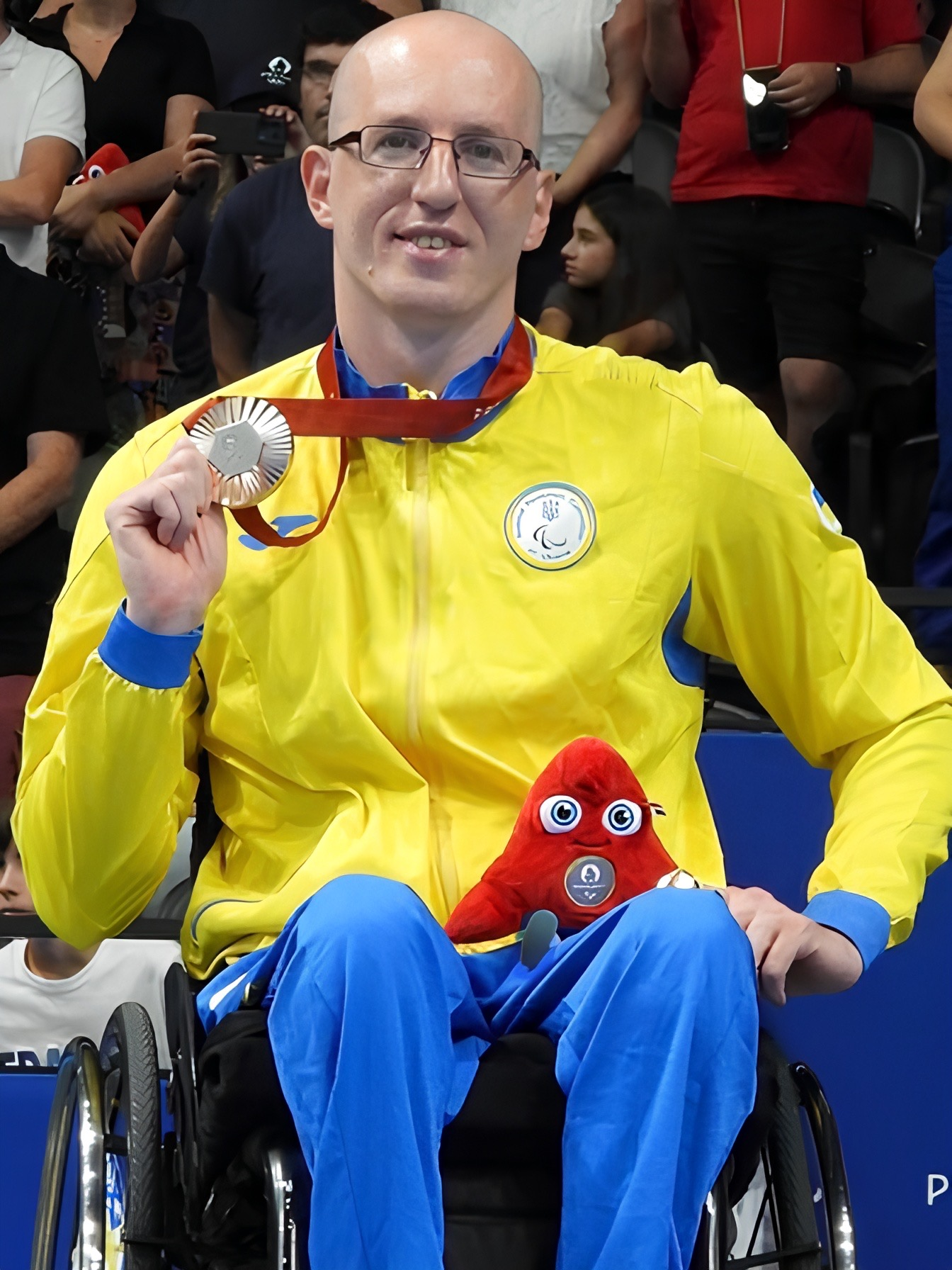
- Komarov at the 2024 Summer Paralympics

Personal information
- Born: 10 June 1988 (age 38) Zhdanov, Donetsk oblast, Ukrainian SSR, Soviet Union (now - Mariupol, Ukraine)

Sport
- Country: Ukraine
- Sport: Paralympic swimming
Medal record
Men's para swimming
Representing Ukraine
Paralympic Games
Gold medal – first place	2016 Rio de Janeiro	4 × 100 m freestyle relay 34pts
Gold medal – first place	2024 Paris	100 m freestyle S5
Bronze medal – third place	2016 Rio de Janeiro	100 m freestyle S6
Bronze medal – third place	2024 Paris	200 m freestyle S5
Bronze medal – third place	2024 Paris	Mixed 4×50 m medley relay 20pts
World Championships
Gold medal – first place	2023 Manchester	100 m freestyle S5
Gold medal – first place	2025 Singapore	100 m freestyle S5
Gold medal – first place	2025 Singapore	Mixed 4×50 m freestyle relay 20pts
Bronze medal – third place	2019 London	100 m freestyle S6
European Championships
Gold medal – first place	2024 Funchal	100 m freestyle S5
Gold medal – first place	2024 Funchal	50 m freestyle S5
Gold medal – first place	2024 Funchal	50 m butterfly S5
Silver medal – second place	2026 Kocaeli	50 m freestyle S5
Bronze medal – third place	2024 Funchal	200 m freestyle S5

Oleksandr Komarov (Ukrainian: Олександр Комаров; born 10 June 1988) is a Ukrainian Paralympic swimmer.

== Career ==
He represented Ukraine at the Summer Paralympics in 2012, 2016, 2020, and 2024. He won the gold medal in the Men's 100 metre freestyle S5 at the 2024 Summer Paralympics and two medals at the 2016 Summer Paralympics: the gold medal in the men's 4 × 100 m freestyle relay 34pts event and the bronze medal in the 100 m freestyle S6 event.

At the 2019 World Para Swimming Championships held in London, United Kingdom, he won the bronze medal in the men's 100m freestyle S6 event.
