= Talisson Glock =

Brazilian Paralympic swimmer (born 1995)

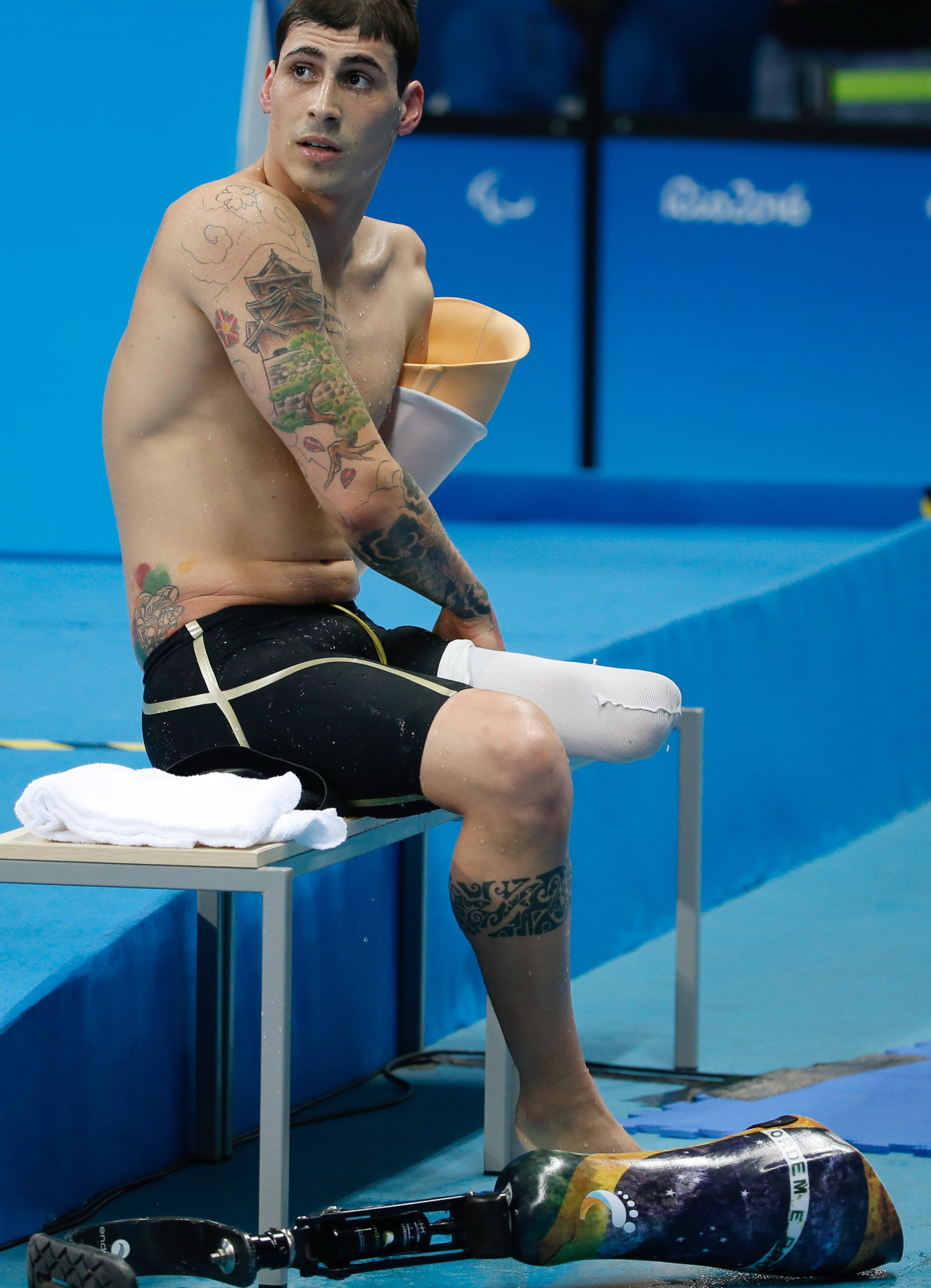

Personal information
- Full name: Talisson Henrique Glock
- Born: 13 February 1995 (age 31) Joinville, Brazil

Sport
- Country: Brazil
- Sport: Paralympic swimming
Medal record
Paralympic Games
Gold medal – first place	2020 Tokyo	400 m freestyle S6
Gold medal – first place	2024 Paris	400 m freestyle S6
Silver medal – second place	2016 Rio de Janeiro	Mixed 4×50 m freestyle relay 20pts
Silver medal – second place	2024 Paris	100 m freestyle S6
Bronze medal – third place	2016 Rio de Janeiro	200 m ind. medley SM6
Bronze medal – third place	2020 Tokyo	Mixed 4×50 m freestyle relay 20pts
Bronze medal – third place	2020 Tokyo	100 m freestyle S6
Bronze medal – third place	2024 Paris	200 m ind. medley SM6
Bronze medal – third place	2024 Paris	Mixed 4×50 m freestyle relay 20 pts
World Championships
Gold medal – first place	2017 Mexico City	100m backstroke S6
Gold medal – first place	2023 Manchester	400 m freestyle S6
Silver medal – second place	2013 Montreal	100 m freestyle S6
Silver medal – second place	2013 Montreal	200 m medley SM6
Silver medal – second place	2015 Glasgow	100 m backstroke S6
Silver medal – second place	2015 Glasgow	4x100m freestyle relay
Silver medal – second place	2017 Mexico City	50m butterfly S6
Silver medal – second place	2023 Manchester	100 m freestyle S6
Silver medal – second place	2025 Singapore	400 m freestyle S6
Bronze medal – third place	2015 Glasgow	200 m ind. medley SM6
Bronze medal – third place	2017 Mexico City	200 m ind. medley SM6
Bronze medal – third place	2022 Madeira	400 m freestyle S6
Bronze medal – third place	2022 Madeira	200 m ind. medley SM6
Parapan American Games
Gold medal – first place	2011 Guadalajara	100 m backstroke S6
Gold medal – first place	2015 Toronto	100m backstroke S6
Gold medal – first place	2015 Toronto	200m ind. medley SM6
Silver medal – second place	2015 Toronto	400m freestyle S6
Silver medal – second place	2015 Toronto	50m butterfly S6
Silver medal – second place	2019 Lima	100m backstroke S6
Silver medal – second place	2019 Lima	200m ind. medley SM6
Bronze medal – third place	2015 Toronto	50 m freestyle S6
Bronze medal – third place	2015 Toronto	100m freestyle S6
Bronze medal – third place	2019 Lima	50m freestyle S6
Bronze medal – third place	2019 Lima	100m freestyle S6

Talisson Henrique Glock (born 13 February 1995) is a Brazilian Paralympic swimmer. He represented Brazil at the Summer Paralympics in 2016, 2021 and in 2024. In total, he won one gold medal, two silver medals and five bronze medals.

== Career ==
In 2011, Glock represented Brazil at the Parapan American Games held in Guadalajara, Mexico. He won the gold medal in the men's 100 metre backstroke S6 event. Four years later, he won several medals at the 2015 Parapan American Games held in Toronto, Canada.

Glock represented Brazil at the 2016 Summer Paralympics in Rio de Janeiro, Brazil and he won the bronze medal in the men's 200 metre individual medley SM6 event.

In 2018, he broke the national record in the men's 50 metre butterfly twice at the World Para Swimming World Series in São Paulo, Brazil, both in the heats and in the final.
