= Colombia at the Paralympics =

Colombia at the Paralympic Games
- IPC code: COL
- NPC: Colombian Paralympic Committee
- Website: www.cpc.org.co (in Spanish)
- Medals Ranked 59th: Gold 13 Silver 22 Bronze 40 Total 75

Summer appearances
- 1976; 1980; 1984; 1988; 1992; 1996; 2000; 2004; 2008; 2012; 2016; 2020; 2024

Colombia made its Paralympic Games début at the 1976 Summer Paralympics in Toronto, with competitors taking part in track and field, table tennis and wheelchair basketball. The country has participated in every subsequent edition of the Summer Paralympic Games, except 1984, but has never entered the Winter Paralympic Games.

Colombians have won a total of 75 medals: 13 gold, 22 silver and 40 bronze, in swimming, athletics, cycling, powerlifting and boccia.

== History ==
Pedro Mejía won the country's first medals when he took a gold and a bronze in swimming in 1980. His winning time of 1:27.88 in the final of the 100m breaststroke, D category, set a new world record. Colombia had to wait 28 years for its next two medals, which both came in the 2008 Games. Elkin Serna ran the men's marathon in 2:31:16 in the T12 category for athletes with severe visual disability, finishing less than a minute behind Chinese athlete Qi Shun's world record time of 2:30:32, and took silver. Moisés Fuentes won bronze in the men's 100m breaststroke in the SB4 category.

The 2020 Summer Paralympics represented the best performance by the Colombian committee, with a total amount of 24 medals won.

== Medals ==
=== Medals at the Summer Games ===
Games	Athletes	Gold	Silver	Bronze	Total	Rank
(Italy) 1960 Rome	Did Not Participate					
(Japan) 1964 Tokyo	Did Not Participate					
(Israel) 1968 Tel Aviv	Did Not Participate					
(Germany) 1972 Heidelberg	Did Not Participate					
(Canada) 1976 Toronto	11	0	0	0	0	–
(Netherlands) 1980 Arnhem	11	1	0	1	2	31
(United Kingdom) (United States) 1984 Stoke Mandeville/New York	Did Not Participate					
(South Korea) 1988 Seoul	17	0	0	0	0	–
(Spain) 1992 Barcelona	6	0	0	0	0	–
(United States) 1996 Atlanta	2	0	0	0	0	–
(Australia) 2000 Sydney	3	0	0	0	0	–
(Greece) 2004 Athens	5	0	0	0	0	–
(China) 2008 Beijing	12	0	1	1	2	60
(United Kingdom) 2012 London	39	0	2	0	2	61
(Brazil) 2016 Rio de Janeiro	39	2	5	10	17	37
(Japan) 2020 Tokyo	61	3	7	14	24	37
(France) 2024 Paris	74	7	7	14	28	19
Total		13	22	40	75	59

=== Medals at Winter Games ===
Games	Athletes	Gold	Silver	Bronze	Total	Rank
(Sweden) Örnsköldsvik 1976	Did Not Participate					
(Norway) Geilo 1980	Did Not Participate					
(Austria) Innsbruck 1984	Did Not Participate					
(Austria) Innsbruck 1988	Did Not Participate					
(France) Albertville 1992	Did Not Participate					
(Norway) Lillehammer 1994	Did Not Participate					
(Japan) Nagano 1998	Did Not Participate					
(United States) Salt Lake City 2002	Did Not Participate					
(Italy) Turin 2006	Did Not Participate					
(Canada) Vancouver 2010	Did Not Participate					
(Russia) Sochi 2014	Did Not Participate					
(South Korea) Pyeongchang 2018	Did Not Participate					
(China) Beijing 2022	Did Not Participate					
(Italy) Milano Cortina 2026	Did Not Participate					
Total		0	0	0	0	−

=== Medals by Summer Sport ===
Sport	Gold	Silver	Bronze	Total
Athletics	8	7	21	36
Swimming	4	14	9	27
Boccia	1	1	1	3
Cycling	0	0	7	7
Powerlifting	0	0	2	2
Totals (5 entries)	13	22	40	75

== List of Medalists ==
Medal	Name	Games	Sport	Event
Gold	Pedro Mejía	(Netherlands) 1980 Arnhem	Swimming	Men's 100 m Breaststroke D
Bronze	Pedro Mejía	(Netherlands) 1980 Arnhem	Swimming	Men's 100 m Backstroke C-D
Silver	Elkin Serna	(China) 2008 Beijing	Athletics	Men's Marathon T12
Bronze	Moisés Fuentes	(China) 2008 Beijing	Swimming	Men's 100 m Breaststroke SB4
Silver	Elkin Serna	(United Kingdom) 2012 London	Athletics	Men's Marathon T12
Silver	Moisés Fuentes	(United Kingdom) 2012 London	Swimming	Men's 100 m Breaststroke SB4
Gold	Carlos Serrano Zárate	(Brazil) 2016 Rio de Janeiro	Swimming	Men's 100 m Breaststroke SB7
Gold	Mauricio Valencia	(Brazil) 2016 Rio de Janeiro	Athletics	Men's Javelin throw F34
Silver	Carlos Serrano Zárate	(Brazil) 2016 Rio de Janeiro	Swimming	Men's 100 m Freestyle S7
Silver	Nelson Crispín	(Brazil) 2016 Rio de Janeiro	Swimming	Men's 50 m Freestyle S6
Silver	Luis Fernando Lucumí Villegas	(Brazil) 2016 Rio de Janeiro	Athletics	Men's Javelin throw F38
Silver	Nelson Crispín	(Brazil) 2016 Rio de Janeiro	Swimming	Men's 100 m Freestyle S6
Silver	Nelson Crispín	(Brazil) 2016 Rio de Janeiro	Swimming	Men's 100 m Breaststroke SB6
Bronze	Martha Liliana Hernández Florián	(Brazil) 2016 Rio de Janeiro	Athletics	Women's 100 m T36
Bronze	Women's Relay Team Marcela González; Sonia Luna Rodríguez; Yesenia Restrepo; Maritza Arango Buitrago	(Brazil) 2016 Rio de Janeiro	Athletics	Women's 4 × 100 m T11-T13
Bronze	Carlos Serrano Zárate	(Brazil) 2016 Rio de Janeiro	Swimming	Men's 50 m Freestyle S7
Bronze	Néstor Javier Ayala	(Brazil) 2016 Rio de Janeiro	Cycling	Men's Road race T1–2
Bronze	Mauricio Valencia	(Brazil) 2016 Rio de Janeiro	Athletics	Men's Shot put F34
Bronze	Diego Germán Dueñas	(Brazil) 2016 Rio de Janeiro	Cycling	Men's Individual pursuit C4
Bronze	Weiner Díaz	(Brazil) 2016 Rio de Janeiro	Athletics	Men's 400 m T38
Bronze	Moisés Fuentes	(Brazil) 2016 Rio de Janeiro	Swimming	Men's 100 m Breaststroke SB4
Bronze	Edwin Fabián Mátiz Ruiz	(Brazil) 2016 Rio de Janeiro	Cycling	Men's Individual pursuit C5
Bronze	Maritza Arango Buitrago	(Brazil) 2016 Rio de Janeiro	Athletics	Women's 1500 m T11
Gold	Nelson Crispín	(Japan) 2020 Tokyo	Swimming	Men's 200 m individual medley SM6
Gold	Carlos Serrano Zárate	(Japan) 2020 Tokyo	Swimming	Men's 100 m Breaststroke SB7
Gold	José Lemos	(Japan) 2020 Tokyo	Athletics	Men's javelin throw F38
Silver	Mayerli Buitrago Ariza	(Japan) 2020 Tokyo	Athletics	Women's shot put F41
Silver	Nelson Crispín	(Japan) 2020 Tokyo	Swimming	Men's 100 metre breaststroke SB6
Silver	Darian Faisury Jiménez	(Japan) 2020 Tokyo	Athletics	Women's 100 metres T38
Silver	Moisés Fuentes	(Japan) 2020 Tokyo	Swimming	Men's 100 metre breaststroke SB4
Silver	Carlos Serrano Zárate	(Japan) 2020 Tokyo	Swimming	Men's 50 metre freestyle S7
Bronze	Luis Fernando Lucumí Villegas	(Japan) 2020 Tokyo	Athletics	Men's javelin throw F38
Bronze	Diego Germán Dueñas	(Japan) 2020 Tokyo	Cycling	Men's individual pursuit C4
Bronze	Carlos Serrano Zárate	(Japan) 2020 Tokyo	Swimming	Men's 200 metre individual medley SM7
Bronze	Angie Pabón	(Japan) 2020 Tokyo	Athletics	Women's 400 metres T11
Bronze	Fabio Torres	(Japan) 2020 Tokyo	Powerlifting	Men's 97 kg
Bronze	Jean Carlos Mina Aponzá	(Japan) 2020 Tokyo	Athletics	Men's 100 metres T13
Bronze	Nelson Crispín	(Japan) 2020 Tokyo	Swimming	Men's 50 metre butterfly S7
Bronze	Yesenia Restrepo	(Japan) 2020 Tokyo	Athletics	Women's discus throw F11
Gold	José Lemos	(France) 2024 Paris	Athletics	Men's javelin throw F38
Gold	Érica Castaño	(France) 2024 Paris	Athletics	Women's discus throw F55
Gold	Karen Palomeque	(France) 2024 Paris	Athletics	Women's 100 metres T38
Gold	Jhon Obando	(France) 2024 Paris	Athletics	Men's 400 metres T20
Gold	Edilson Chica; Leidy Chica	(France) 2024 Paris	Boccia	Mixed pairs BC4
Gold	Mauricio Valencia	(France) 2024 Paris	Athletics	Men's shot put F34
Gold	Karen Palomeque	(France) 2024 Paris	Athletics	Women's 400 metres T38
Silver	Edilson Chica	(France) 2024 Paris	Boccia	Men's individual BC4
Silver	Nelson Crispín	(France) 2024 Paris	Swimming	Men's 200 metre individual medley SM6
Silver	Nelson Crispín	(France) 2024 Paris	Swimming	Men's 100 metre breaststroke SB6
Silver	Nelson Crispín	(France) 2024 Paris	Swimming	Men's 50 metre butterfly S6
Silver	Mauricio Valencia	(France) 2024 Paris	Athletics	Men's javelin throw F34
Silver	Carlos Serrano Zárate	(France) 2024 Paris	Swimming	Men's 50 metre freestyle S7
Silver	Carlos Serrano Zárate	(France) 2024 Paris	Swimming	Men's 50 metre butterfly S7
Bronze	Carlos Serrano Zárate	(France) 2024 Paris	Swimming	Men's 100 metre breaststroke SB8
Bronze	Juan Campas	(France) 2024 Paris	Athletics	Men's 100 metres T38
Bronze	Darian Faisury Jiménez	(France) 2024 Paris	Athletics	Women's 100 metres T38
Bronze	Leidy Chica	(France) 2024 Paris	Boccia	Women's individual BC4
Bronze	Juan Campas	(France) 2024 Paris	Athletics	Men's 400 metres T38
Bronze	Diego Meneses	(France) 2024 Paris	Athletics	Men's javelin throw F34
Bronze	José Lemos	(France) 2024 Paris	Athletics	Men's long jump T38
Bronze	Buinder Bermúdez	(France) 2024 Paris	Athletics	Men's 400 metres T13
Bronze	Karen Palomeque	(France) 2024 Paris	Athletics	Women's long jump T38
Bronze	Paula Ossa	(France) 2024 Paris	Cycling	Women's road race C4–5
Bronze	Xiomara Saldarriaga	(France) 2024 Paris	Athletics	Women's discus throw F38
Bronze	Juan José Betancourt Quiroga	(France) 2024 Paris	Cycling	Men's road race T1–2
Bronze	Fabio Torres	(France) 2024 Paris	Powerlifting	Men's 97 kg
Bronze	Jhon Obando	(France) 2024 Paris	Athletics	Men's long jump T20

== See also ==
- Colombia at the Olympics
- Colombia at the Youth Olympics
- Colombia at the Pan American Games
