= Colombia at the 2024 Summer Paralympics =

- Flag of Colombia
- IPC code: COL
- NPC: Colombian Paralympic Committee
- Website: www.cpc.org.co (in Spanish)

in Paris, France August 28, 2024 – September 8, 2024
- Competitors: 74 (43 men and 31 women) in 10 sports
- Flag bearers: Paula Ossa; Carlos Serrano Zárate
- Medals Ranked 19th: Gold 7 Silver 7 Bronze 14 Total 28

Summer Paralympics appearances (overview)
- 1976; 1980; 1984; 1988; 1992; 1996; 2000; 2004; 2008; 2012; 2016; 2020; 2024

Colombia competed at the 2024 Summer Paralympics in Paris, France, from 28 August to 8 September.

== Medalists ==
Medal	Name	Sport	Event	Date
Gold	José Lemos	Athletics	Men's javelin throw F38	30 August
Gold	Érica Castaño	Athletics	Women's discus throw F55	30 August
Gold	Karen Palomeque	Athletics	Women's 100 metres T38	31 August
Gold	Jhon Obando	Athletics	Men's 400 metres T20	3 September
Gold	Edilson Chica; Leidy Chica	Boccia	Mixed pairs BC4	5 September
Gold	Mauricio Valencia	Athletics	Men's shot put F34	7 September
Gold	Karen Palomeque	Athletics	Women's 400 metres T38	7 September
Silver	Nelson Crispín	Swimming	Men's 200 metre individual medley SM6	30 August
Silver	Nelson Crispín	Swimming	Men's 100 metre breaststroke SB6	1 September
Silver	Edilson Chica	Boccia	Men's individual BC4	2 September
Silver	Nelson Crispín	Swimming	Men's 50 metre butterfly S6	3 September
Silver	Mauricio Valencia	Athletics	Men's javelin throw F34	4 September
Silver	Carlos Serrano Zárate	Swimming	Men's 50 metre freestyle S7	4 September
Silver	Carlos Serrano Zárate	Swimming	Men's 50 metre butterfly S7	7 September
Bronze	Carlos Serrano Zárate	Swimming	Men's 100 metre breaststroke SB8	30 August
Bronze	Juan Campas	Athletics	Men's 100 metres T38	31 August
Bronze	Darian Faisury Jiménez	Athletics	Women's 100 metres T38	31 August
Bronze	Leidy Chica	Boccia	Women's individual BC4	1 September
Bronze	Juan Campas	Athletics	Men's 400 metres T38	3 September
Bronze	Diego Meneses	Athletics	Men's javelin throw F34	4 September
Bronze	José Lemos	Athletics	Men's long jump T38	4 September
Bronze	Buinder Bermúdez	Athletics	Men's 400 metres T13	5 September
Bronze	Karen Palomeque	Athletics	Women's long jump T38	5 September
Bronze	Paula Ossa	Cycling	Women's road race C4–5	6 September
Bronze	Xiomara Saldarriaga	Athletics	Women's discus throw F38	6 September
Bronze	Juan José Betancourt Quiroga	Cycling	Men's road race T1–2	7 September
Bronze	Fabio Torres	Powerlifting	Men's 97 kg	7 September
Bronze	Jhon Obando	Athletics	Men's long jump T20	7 September

Medals by sport
Sport	1st place, gold medalist(s)	2nd place, silver medalist(s)	3rd place, bronze medalist(s)	Total
Athletics	6	1	9	16
Boccia	1	1	1	3
Swimming	0	5	1	6
Cycling	0	0	2	2
Powerlifting	0	0	1	1
Total	7	7	14	28

Medals by gender
Gender	1st place, gold medalist(s)	2nd place, silver medalist(s)	3rd place, bronze medalist(s)	Total	Percentage
Female	3	0	5	8	28,57%
Male	3	7	9	19	67,86%
Mixed	1	0	0	1	3,57%
Total	7	7	14	28	100%

Medals by day
Day	Date	1st place, gold medalist(s)	2nd place, silver medalist(s)	3rd place, bronze medalist(s)	Total
1	29 August	0	0	0	0
2	30 August	2	1	1	4
3	31 August	1	0	2	3
4	1 September	0	1	1	2
5	2 September	0	1	0	1
6	3 September	1	1	1	3
7	4 September	0	2	2	4
8	5 September	1	0	2	3
9	6 September	0	0	2	2
10	7 September	2	1	3	6
11	8 September	0	0	0	0
Total		7	7	14	28

Multiple medalists
Name	Sport	1st place, gold medalist(s)	2nd place, silver medalist(s)	3rd place, bronze medalist(s)	Total
Karen Palomeque	Athletics	2	0	1	3
Nelson Crispín	Swimming	0	3	0	3
Carlos Serrano Zárate	Swimming	0	2	1	3
Edilson Chica	Boccia	1	1	0	2
Mauricio Valencia	Athletics	1	1	0	2
Jhon Obando	Athletics	1	0	1	2
Leidy Chica	Boccia	1	0	1	2
José Lemos	Athletics	1	0	1	2
Juan Campas	Athletics	0	0	2	2

== Competitors ==
The following is the list of number of competitors in the Games:

Sport	Men	Women	Total
Archery	1	1	2
Athletics	14	14	28
Football 5-a-side	10	—N/a	10
Boccia	3	1	4
Cycling	3	2	5
Paratriathlon	1	0	1
Powerlifting	2	3	5
Shooting	0	1	1
Swimming	9	7	16
Wheelchair tennis	0	2	2
Total	43	31	74

== Archery ==
Colombia entered one male and one female archers into the games by virtue of their individual result at the 2023 Parapan American Games in Santiago, Chile.

Athlete	Event	Ranking Round		Round of 32	Round of 16	Quarterfinals	Semifinals	Finals	
Athlete	Event	Score	Seed	Opposition Score	Opposition Score	Opposition Score	Opposition Score	Opposition Score	Rank
Héctor Ramírez	Men's individual recurve	611	16	Blas (GUA); W 6–4	Toucoullet (FRA); W 6–4	Singh (IND); L 2–6	Did not advance		7
María Daza	Women's individual recurve	558	14	Shevchenko (UKR); L 2–6	Did not advance				=17
Héctor Ramírez; María Daza	Mixed team recurve	1169	10	—N/a	Slovenia (SLO); L 2–6	Did not advance			=9

== Athletics ==
Colombian track and field athletes achieved quota places for the following events based on their results at the 2023 World Championships, 2024 World Championships, or through high performance allocation, as long as they meet the minimum entry standard (MES).

Key

- Note–Ranks given for track events are within the athlete's heat only
- Q = Qualified for the next round
- q = Qualified for the next round as a fastest loser or, in field events, by position without achieving the qualifying target
- DQ = Disqualified
- PR = Paralympic Record
- AR = Area (or continental) Record
- NR = National Record
- SB = Season's Best
- N/A = Round not applicable for the event
- Bye = Athlete not required to compete in round

Track & road events
Men

Athlete	Event	Heat		Semifinal		Final	
Athlete	Event	Time	Rank	Time	Rank	Time	Rank
Jhon Obando	400 m T20	—N/a				48.09	1st place, gold medalist(s)
Andrés Malambo	100 m T37	13.77	11	—N/a		Did not advance	
Andrés Malambo	200 m T37	DNS		—N/a		Did not advance	
Yeferson Suárez	400 m T37	52.73	8 q	—N/a		52.49	7
Yamil Acosta	400 m T12	1:23.66	9	—N/a		Did not advance	
Buinder Bermúdez	400 m T13	—N/a				48.83 AR	3rd place, bronze medalist(s)
Santiago Solís	100 m T38	—N/a				11.17 PB	6
Juan Campas	100 m T38	—N/a				10.99 PB	3rd place, bronze medalist(s)
Juan Campas	400 m T38	—N/a				49.92 PB	3rd place, bronze medalist(s)
Luis Fernando Lara	100 m T47	11.32 PB	13	—N/a		Did not advance	
Luis Fernando Lara	400 m T47	48.96 PB	5 Q	—N/a		46.68 PB	4
Francisco Sanclemente	Marathon T54	—N/a				1:46:27	10

Women

Athlete	Event	Heat		Semifinal		Final	
Athlete	Event	Time	Rank	Time	Rank	Time	Rank
Darian Faisury Jiménez	100 m T38	12.70 SB	5 Q	—N/a		12.53 SB	3rd place, bronze medalist(s)
Darian Faisury Jiménez	400 m T38	1:06.60	10	—N/a		Did not advance	
María Alejandra Murillo	400 m T20	59.52 SB	11	—N/a		Did not advance	
Francy Osorio; Guide:William Higuera	1500 m T13	—N/a				4:40.70 SB	7
Ionis Salcedo; Guide:Niver Rangel	400 m T11	1:00.03	5 Q	59.72	4 q	1:00.15	4
Angie Pabón; Guide:Luis Arizala	100 m T11	DNS		Did not advance			
Angie Pabón; Guide:Luis Arizala	200 m T11	DNS		Did not advance			
Angie Pabón; Guide:Luis Arizala	400 m T11	DNS		Did not advance			
Karen Palomeque	100 m T38	12.45 AR	1 Q	—N/a		12.26 WR	1st place, gold medalist(s)
Karen Palomeque	400 m T38	59.88 PR	1 Q	—N/a		58.67 WR	1st place, gold medalist(s)

Field events
Men

Athlete	Event	Qualification		Final	
Athlete	Event	Distance	Position	Distance	Position
Jhon Obando	Long jump T20	—N/a		7.38 AR	3rd place, bronze medalist(s)
Yeferson Suárez	Long jump T37	—N/a		5.71 PB	8
Mauricio Valencia	Javelin throw F34	—N/a		39.04 AR	2nd place, silver medalist(s)
Mauricio Valencia	Shot put F34	—N/a		11.71 SB	1st place, gold medalist(s)
Diego Meneses	Javelin throw F34	—N/a		37.17 SB	3rd place, bronze medalist(s)
Diego Meneses	Shot put F34	—N/a		10.63	7
José Lemos	Javelin throw F38	—N/a		63.81 WR	1st place, gold medalist(s)
José Lemos	Long jump T38	—N/a		6.40 SB	3rd place, bronze medalist(s)
Luis Fernando Lucumí Villegas	Javelin throw F38	—N/a		50.32	5
Andrés Mosquera	Discus throw F64	—N/a		57.59	4

Women

Athlete	Event	Qualification		Final	
Athlete	Event	Distance	Position	Distance	Position
María Alejandra Murillo	Long jump T20	—N/a		5.14	11
Karen Palomeque	Long jump T38	—N/a		4.99 AR	3rd place, bronze medalist(s)
Yesica Muñoz	Shot put F40	—N/a		6.69 SB	10
Yesenia Restrepo	Discus throw F11	—N/a		33.77 SB	6
Yasiris Blandon	Javelin throw F13	—N/a		26.55 SB	10
Mayerli Buitrago Ariza	Shot put F41	—N/a		9.39	4
Mayerli Buitrago Ariza	Discus throw F41	—N/a		DNS	
Xiomara Saldarriaga	Discus throw F38	—N/a		38.36 AR	3rd place, bronze medalist(s)
Érica Castaño	Discus throw F55	—N/a		26.70	1st place, gold medalist(s)
Érica Castaño	Javelin throw F56	16.12 SB	4 q	15.47	12
María Henao	Discus throw F38	—N/a		33.01 SB	8
María Henao	Shot put F37	—N/a		9.81	8
Yeniffer Paredes	Discus throw F57	—N/a		30.12 PB	6

== Blind football ==
The Colombian men's blind football team qualified for the paralympic games by virtue of top three nation's, not yet qualified, at the 2023 IBSA World Games in Birmingham, Great Britain.

Summary

Team	Event	Group Stage				Semifinals	Final / BM	
Team	Event	Opposition Score	Opposition Score	Opposition Score	Rank	Opposition Score	Opposition Score	Rank
Colombia men's	Men's tournament	Japan; W 1–0	Argentina; D 0–0	Morocco; W 1–0	1 Q	France; L 0–1	Brazil; L 0–1	4

Team roster

Coach: Fernando Carrillo Ramirez

The following is the Colombia squad in the football 5-a-side tournament of the 2024 Summer Paralympics.

No.	Pos.	Player	Class	Date of birth (age)
1	GK	Jhohan Ardila	Sighted	26 August 1998 (aged 26)
2	MF	Fredy López	B1	10 October 1984 (aged 39)
5	MF	Alex Martínez	B1	6 February 1986 (aged 38)
6	DF	Jesús López	B1	29 November 1993 (aged 30)
7	DF	Jhon Hernández	B1	12 June 1993 (aged 31)
8	FW	Lino Coca	B1	23 September 2003 (aged 20)
9	FW	Jhon Éider González	B1	27 July 1997 (aged 27)
10	FW	Juan Pérez	B1	3 March 1996 (aged 28)
11	FW	Julián Jaramillo	B1	24 July 2001 (aged 23)
12	GK	Jhon Fredy Gómez	Sighted	4 May 1990 (aged 34)

Group stage

Pos	Team	Pld	W	D	L	GF	GA	GD	Pts	Qualification
1	Colombia	3	2	1	0	2	0	+2	7	Semi-finals
2	Argentina	3	1	2	0	1	0	+1	5	Semi-finals
3	Morocco	3	1	1	1	1	1	0	4	Fifth place match
4	Japan	3	0	0	3	0	3	−3	0	Seventh place match

Source: Paris 2024
1 September 2024
11:30

Japan	0–1	Colombia
	Report	Pérez 8'

Eiffel Tower Stadium, Paris
Attendance: 8,900
Referee: Tom Jozef de Bruyne (Belgium)

2 September 2024
11:30

Argentina	0–0	Colombia
	Report

Eiffel Tower Stadium, Paris
Attendance: 8,790
Referee: Jose Alfredo Martinez Ibarra (Mexico)

3 September 2024
11:30

Colombia	1–0	Morocco
Pérez 25'	Report

Eiffel Tower Stadium, Paris
Attendance: 8,890
Referee: François Carcouët (France)

Semi-finals

5 September 2024
17:30

Colombia	0–1	France
	Report	Villeroux 26'

Eiffel Tower Stadium, Paris
Attendance: 11,630
Referee: Tom Jozef de Bruyne (Belgium)

Bronze medal match

7 September 2024
17:30

Colombia	0–1	Brazil
	Report	Jefinho 24'

Eiffel Tower Stadium, Paris
Attendance: 11,679
Referee: François Carcouët (France)

== Boccia ==
Colombia entered two athletes into the Paralympics games, after nominated top four pairs in mixed BC4 events, through the final world ranking.

Athlete	Event	Pool matches				Quarterfinals	Semifinals	Final / BM	
Athlete	Event	Opposition Score	Opposition Score	Opposition Score	Rank	Opposition Score	Opposition Score	Opposition Score	Rank
Jesús Romero	Men's individual BC3	Jeong H-w (KOR); L 2–12	Gonçalves (POR); L 2–4	Choochuenklin (THA); L 0–10	4	Did not advance			15
Edilson Chica	Men's individual BC4	Agache (ESP); W 4–2	Strehársky (SVK); W 4–1	Komar (CRO); L 3–3*	2 Q	Grisales (COL); W 4–1	Kolinko (UKR); W 3–1	McGuire (GBR); L 5–8	2nd place, silver medalist(s)
Euclides Grisales	Men's individual BC4	Nicolai (GER); W 11–0	Allam (EGY); W 9–5	Larpyen (THA); W 5–1	1 Q	Chica (COL); L 1–4	Did not advance		6
Leidy Chica	Women's individual BC4	Mayo (ESP); W 4–2	Arambasic (CRO); W 9–1	Metzou (GRE); W 10–3	1 Q	Levine (CAN); W 3–2	Lin (CHN); L 3–4	Mat Salim (MAS); W 7–1	3rd place, bronze medalist(s)
Edilson Chica; Leidy Chica	Mixed pairs BC4	Malaysia; W 5–2	Ukraine; L 3–3*	—N/a	1 Q	China; W 7–3	Thailand; W 4–1	Hong Kong; W 6–1	1st place, gold medalist(s)

== Cycling ==
Colombia entered two para-cyclists (one in each gender) after finished the top eligible nation's at the 2022 UCI Nation's ranking allocation ranking.

=== Road ===
Men

Athlete	Event	Time	Rank
Carlos Vargas	Road race C4–5	DNS	
Carlos Vargas	Time trial C5	DNF	
Edwin Fabián Mátiz Ruiz	Road race C4–5	–1 LAP	21
Juan José Betancourt Quiroga	Road race T1–2	1:17:09	3rd place, bronze medalist(s)
Juan José Betancourt Quiroga	Time trial T1–2	25:06.46	7

Women

Athlete	Event	Time	Rank
Daniela Munévar	Road race C1–3	1:45:44	10
Daniela Munévar	Time trial C1–3	23:29.46	10
Paula Ossa	Road race C4–5	1:54:44	3rd place, bronze medalist(s)
Paula Ossa	Time trial C5	22:48.31	7

=== Track ===
Men

Athlete	Event	Qualification		Final	
Athlete	Event	Time	Rank	Opposition Time	Rank
Carlos Vargas	Pursuit C5	4:33.077	10	Did not advance	
Edwin Fabián Mátiz Ruiz	Time trial C4-5	1:05.703	9	Did not advance	
Edwin Fabián Mátiz Ruiz	Pursuit C5	4:38.993	11	Did not advance	

Women

Athlete	Event	Qualification		Final	
Athlete	Event	Time	Rank	Opposition Time	Rank
Daniela Munévar	Individual pursuit C1-3	4:14.667	8	Did not advance	
Paula Ossa	Pursuit C5	3:49.837	6	Did not advance	

Mixed

Athlete	Event	Qualification		Final	
Athlete	Event	Time	Rank	Opposition Time	Rank
Carlos Vargas; Edwin Fabián Mátiz Ruiz; Daniela Munévar	Open team sprint C1-5	55.621	5	Did not advance	

== Paratriathlon ==
Men

Athlete	Event	Swim (750 m)	Trans 1	Bike (20 km)	Trans 2	Run (5 km)	Total time	Rank
Juan Esteban Patiño	PTS2	12:31	1:32	37:57	1:20	21:30	1:14:50	DSQ

== Powerlifting ==
Men

Athlete	Event	Attempts (kg)				Result (kg)	Rank
Athlete	Event	1	2	3	4	Result (kg)	Rank
Fabio Torres	97 kg	225	228	~~235~~	–	228	3rd place, bronze medalist(s)
Eglain Mena	+107 kg	232 ^{LC}	236 ^{LC}	~~237~~ ^{LC}	–	236	4

Women

Athlete	Event	Attempts (kg)				Result (kg)	Rank
Athlete	Event	1	2	3	4	Result (kg)	Rank
Cristina Poblador	41 kg	100	102	~~105~~	–	102	4
Ana Lucia Pinto	61 kg	113	~~117~~	~~118~~ ^{LC}	–	113	7
Bertha Fernández	67 kg	126	131	~~134~~	–	131	5

== Shooting ==
For the first time, Colombia entered one para-shooter's after achieved quota places for the following events by virtue of their best finishes at the 2022, 2023 and 2024 world cup, 2022 World Championships, 2023 World Championships and 2023 Parapan American Games, as long as they obtained a minimum qualifying score (MQS).

Mixed

Athlete	Event	Qualification		Final	
Athlete	Event	Points	Rank	Points	Rank
María Restrepo	R3 10 metre air rifle prone SH1	629.4	25	Did not advance	
María Restrepo	R6 50 metre rifle prone SH1	610.6	29	Did not advance	

== Swimming ==
Colombia secured four quotas at the 2023 World Para Swimming Championships after finishing in the top two places in Paralympic class disciplines.

Men

Athlete	Event	Heats		Final	
Athlete	Event	Result	Rank	Result	Rank
Nelson Crispín	100 m freestyle S6	1:08.70	7 Q	1:06.07	4
Nelson Crispín	100 m breaststroke SB6	1:20.70	2 Q	1:19.76	2nd place, silver medalist(s)
Nelson Crispín	50 m butterfly S6	31.50	1 Q	31.53	2nd place, silver medalist(s)
Nelson Crispín	200 m individual medley SM6	2:42.23	2 Q	2:38.04 AM	2nd place, silver medalist(s)
Juan Esteban García	200 m freestyle S14	1:57.14	4 Q	1:57.42	5
Juan Esteban García	100 m backstroke S14	1:02.69	11	Did not advance	
Daniel Giraldo Correa	100 m freestyle S12	57.53	12	Did not advance	
Daniel Giraldo Correa	100 m backstroke S12	1:09.98	12	Did not advance	
Daniel Giraldo Correa	100 m butterfly S12	1:03.94	12	Did not advance	
Leider Lemus	100 m breaststroke SB11	1:18.13	5 Q	1:17.41	6
Kevin Moreno	200 m freestlyle S5	2:59.71	11	Did not advance	
Kevin Moreno	50 m backstroke S5	41.73	11	Did not advance	
David Rendón	100 m freestyle S6	1:10.12	8 Q	1:09.21	7
David Rendón	400 m freestyle S6	5:23.57	8 Q	5:23.82	8
David Rendón	100 m breaststroke SB6	1:28.50	11	Did not advance	
David Rendón	200 m individual medley SM6	2:55.60	9 R	Did not advance	
Miguel Ángel Rincón	200 m freestyle S5	3:00.67	12	Did not advance	
Miguel Ángel Rincón	100 m breaststroke SB4	1:47.20	6 Q	1:45.42	5
Carlos Serrano Zárate	50 m freestyle S7	28.12	3 Q	27.60	2nd place, silver medalist(s)
Carlos Serrano Zárate	50 m butterfly S7	29.43	1 Q	29.08	2nd place, silver medalist(s)
Carlos Serrano Zárate	100 m breaststroke SB8	1:12.12	4 Q	1:10.55 PR	3rd place, bronze medalist(s)
Carlos Serrano Zárate	200 m individual medley SM7	2:43.80	7 Q	2:33.24	4
Brayan Triana	50 m freestyle S11	28.59	13	Did not advance	
Brayan Triana	200 m individual medley SM11	—N/a		2:44.14	8
Brayan Triana	100 m breaststroke SB11	1:21.80	8 Q	1:22.93	7

Women

Athlete	Event	Heats		Final	
Athlete	Event	Result	Rank	Result	Rank
María Barrera Zapata	50 m freestyle S10	28.35	9 R	Did not advance	
María Barrera Zapata	100 m freestyle S10	1:02.39	8 Q	1:01.33	6
María Barrera Zapata	400 m freestyle S10	5:00.09	10 R	Did not advance	
María Barrera Zapata	100 m butterfly S10	1:11.38	10 R	Did not advance	
Laura Carolina González Rodríguez	100 m backstroke S8	1:27.94	13	Did not advance	
Laura Carolina González Rodríguez	100 m butterfly S8	1:19.13	9 R	Did not advance	
Laura Carolina González Rodríguez	200 metre individual medley SM8	3:06.85	14	Did not advance	
Mariana Guerrero	50 m freestyle S6	36.25	9 R	Did not advance	
Mariana Guerrero	50 m butterfly S6	41.30	11	Did not advance	
Gabriela Oviedo	50 m backstroke S5	51.69	15	Did not advance	
Gabriela Oviedo	100 m breaststroke SB4	DSQ		Did not advance	
Gabriela Oviedo	200 m individual medley SM5	3:55.01	8 Q	3:54.82	8
Gisell Prada	100 m breaststroke SB7	1:44.51	7 Q	1:41.58	6
Zharith Rodríguez	50 m butterfly S7	37.74	8 Q	38.17	8
Zharith Rodríguez	200 m individual medley SM7	3:15.48	10 R	Did not advance	
Sara Vargas Blanco	100 metre freestyle S7	1:13.97	8 Q	1:12.31	6
Sara Vargas Blanco	50 metre butterfly S7	37.24	6 Q	36.72	5
Sara Vargas Blanco	200 m individual medley SM7	3:10.43	8 Q	3:09.79	8

== Wheelchair tennis ==
Women

Athlete	Event	Round of 64	Round of 32	Round of 16	Quarterfinals	Semifinals	Final / BM	
Athlete	Event	Opposition Score	Opposition Score	Opposition Score	Opposition Score	Opposition Score	Opposition Score	Rank
Angélica Bernal	Singles	—N/a	Déroulède (FRA); W 6–3, 6–1	Takamuro (JPN); W 6–2, 6–1	Wang (CHN); L 2–6, 3–6	Did not advance		=5
Zuleinny Rodríguez	Singles	—N/a	Cabrillana (CHI); L 3–6, 1–6	Did not advance				=17
Angélica Bernal; Zuleinny Rodríguez	Doubles	—N/a		Chasteau / Déroulède (FRA); W 6–2, 4–6, [11–9]	Guo / Wang (CHN); L 1–6, 4–6	Did not advance		=5

== See also ==
- Colombia at the 2024 Summer Olympics
- Colombia at the Paralympics
