= Colombia at the 2012 Summer Paralympics =

- IPC code: COL
- NPC: Colombian Paralympic Committee
- Website: www.cpc.org.co (in Spanish)

in London
- Competitors: 39 in 7 sports
- Flag bearer: Elkin Serna
- Medals Ranked 61st: Gold 0 Silver 2 Bronze 0 Total 2

Summer Paralympics appearances (overview)
- 1976; 1980; 1984; 1988; 1992; 1996; 2000; 2004; 2008; 2012; 2016; 2020; 2024

Colombia competed at the 2012 Summer Paralympics in London, United Kingdom from August 29 to September 9, 2012.

== Medalists ==
Medal	Name	Sport	Event
Silver	Moisés Fuentes	Swimming	Men's 100 metre breaststroke SB4
Silver	Elkin Serna	Athletics	Marathon T12

== Athletics ==
Men–track

Athlete	Events	Heat		Semifinal		Final	
Athlete	Events	Time	Rank	Time	Rank	Time	Rank
Fabio Gutierrez Torres	Men's 800 metres T36	—N/a				2:30.20	8
Elkin Serna	Marathon T12	—N/a				2:26:39	2nd place, silver medalist(s)
William Sosa; Guide: Cesar Chavarro Dias	Men's 1500 metres T11	4:15.66	3 q	—N/a		4:13.53	5

Men–field

Athlete	Events	Result	Rank
Fernando Mina Cortes	Discus throw F57-58	41.94 m 673 pts	12
Fernando Mina Cortes	Javelin throw F57/58	44.27 m 917 pts	8
Fernando Mina Cortes	Shot put F57-58	12.21 m 690 pts	14
Edwin Rodriguez Gonzales	Discus throw F11	33.39 m	5
Edwin Rodriguez Gonzales	Shot put F11-12	11.33 m 845 pts	9
Mauricio Valencia	Discus throw F32/33/34	36.50 m 855 pts	12
Mauricio Valencia	Javelin throw F33/34	33.31 m	9
Mauricio Valencia	Shot put F34	11.82 m	5

Women–track

Athlete	Events	Heat		Semifinal		Final	
Athlete	Events	Time	Rank	Time	Rank	Time	Rank
Maritza Arango Buitrago; Guide: Jonathan Sanchez Gonzalez	Women's 1500 metres T12	—N/a				5:05.72	6
Martha Liliana Hernández Florián	Women's 100 metres T36	—N/a				16.39	5

Women–field

Athlete	Events	Result	Rank
Martha Liliana Hernández Florián	Women's discus F35-36	21.40 m 713 pts	9
Yanive Torres	Women's javelin throw F54/55/56	13.03 m	9
Yanive Torres	Women's shot put F54-56	5.20 m 673 pts	14
Yesenia Restrepo	Women's shot put F11-12	No Mark	-

Key

- Note–Ranks given for track events are within the athlete's heat only
- Q = Qualified for the next round
- q = Qualified for the next round as a fastest loser
- WR = World record
- PR = Paralympic record
- EU = European record
- NR = National record
- N/A = Round not applicable for the event
- Bye = Athlete not required to compete in round

== Cycling ==
=== Road ===
Athlete	Event	Time	Rank
Néstor Javier Ayala	Mixed road race T1-2	DNF	

== Judo ==
Athlete	Event	Preliminaries	Quarterfinals	Semifinals	Repechage First round	Repechage Final	Final / BM	
Athlete	Event	Opposition Result	Opposition Result	Opposition Result	Opposition Result	Opposition Result	Opposition Result	Rank
Juan Castellanos	Men's –60 kg	Hirai (JPN); L 101–0001	Did not advance					

== Powerlifting ==
Athlete	Event	Total lifted	Rank
Jainer Rafael Cantillo Guette	Men's –67.5 kg	193 kg	4

== Swimming ==
Men

Athlete	Events	Heats		Final	
Athlete	Events	Time	Rank	Time	Rank
Nelson Crispín	Men's 100 metre freestyle S6	1:13.68	5	Did not advance	
Nelson Crispín	Men's 50 metre butterfly S6	32.42 Q, AM	3	32.71	5
Nelson Crispín	Men's 100 metre breaststroke SB6	1:28.42 Q	3	1:27.19 AM	4
Nelson Crispín	Men's 200 metre individual medley SM6	2:57.88 Q, AM	5	2:55.52 AM	6
Moisés Fuentes	Men's 100 metre breaststroke SB4	1:38.09 Q	2	1:36.92	2nd place, silver medalist(s)
Daniel Giraldo Correa	Men's 50 metre freestyle S12	25.80	2	Did not advance	
Daniel Giraldo Correa	Men's 100 metre freestyle S12	56.78	6	Did not advance	
Leider Lemus	Men's 100 metre breaststroke SB11	1:23.45	6	Did not advance	
Leider Lemus	Men's 100 metre butterfly S11	1:11.02	5	Did not advance	
Leider Lemus	Men's 200 metre individual medley SM11	DSQ		Did not advance	
Daniel Londoño	Men's 50 metre freestyle S6	34.98	6	Did not advance	
Daniel Londoño	Men's 100 metre freestyle S6	1:14.55	7	Did not advance	
Daniel Londoño	Men's 200 metre individual medley SM6	3:11.87	=6	Did not advance	
Daniel Londoño	Men's 400 metre freestyle S6	5:34.10 Q	4	5:29.13	5
Brayan Urbano	Men's 400 metre freestyle S11	5:35.03	6	Did not advance	
Brayan Urbano	Men's 100 metre breaststroke SB11	1:23.81	5	Did not advance	

Women

Athlete	Events	Heats		Final	
Athlete	Events	Time	Rank	Time	Rank
Naiver Ramos	Women's 100 metre breaststroke SB4	2:20.51	6	Did not advance	

== Wheelchair basketball ==
=== Men's tournament ===
Squad list	Group stage		Quarterfinal	Semifinal	Final	
Squad list	Opposition Result	Rank	Opposition Result	Opposition Result	Opposition Result	Rank
From: Germán García; William Pulido; Leonardo Chaparro; Guillermo Alzate; Freddy Rodriguez; Diego Capacho; José Leep Ipema; Edinson Hernández; William Rivers; Rodney Hawkins; Nelson Jaime Sanz; Leonardo Diaz	Poland; L 45-63	6	Did not advance			
From: Germán García; William Pulido; Leonardo Chaparro; Guillermo Alzate; Freddy Rodriguez; Diego Capacho; José Leep Ipema; Edinson Hernández; William Rivers; Rodney Hawkins; Nelson Jaime Sanz; Leonardo Diaz	Germany; L 46–59	6	Did not advance			
From: Germán García; William Pulido; Leonardo Chaparro; Guillermo Alzate; Freddy Rodriguez; Diego Capacho; José Leep Ipema; Edinson Hernández; William Rivers; Rodney Hawkins; Nelson Jaime Sanz; Leonardo Diaz	Great Britain; W 41–81	6	Did not advance			
From: Germán García; William Pulido; Leonardo Chaparro; Guillermo Alzate; Freddy Rodriguez; Diego Capacho; José Leep Ipema; Edinson Hernández; William Rivers; Rodney Hawkins; Nelson Jaime Sanz; Leonardo Diaz	Japan; W 49-63	6	Did not advance			
From: Germán García; William Pulido; Leonardo Chaparro; Guillermo Alzate; Freddy Rodriguez; Diego Capacho; José Leep Ipema; Edinson Hernández; William Rivers; Rodney Hawkins; Nelson Jaime Sanz; Leonardo Diaz	Canada; W 42-68	6	Did not advance			

Group B

Team	Pld	W	L	PF	PA	PD	Pts	Qualification
Canada	5	5	0	362	280	+82	10	Quarter-finals
Germany	5	4	1	339	303	+36	9	Quarter-finals
Great Britain	5	3	2	365	301	+64	8	Quarter-finals
Poland	5	2	3	327	341	−14	7	Quarter-finals
Japan	5	1	4	273	330	−57	6	Eliminated
Colombia	5	0	5	223	334	−111	5	Eliminated

30 August 2012
15:15

Report

Colombia	45–63	Poland
Scoring by quarter: 11–16, 18–14, 8–14, 8–19
Pts: Sanz Londono 21; Rebs: Sanz Londono 8 Asts: Ipema 4		Pts: Filipski, Balcerowski 18; Rebs: Luszynski 12; Asts: Luszynski 12

Basketball Arena, London
Referees: Matt Wells (AUS)

31 August 2012
10:45

Report

Germany	59–46	Colombia
Scoring by quarter: 17–6, 21–8, 9–15, 12–17
Pts: Wolk 13; Rebs: Passiwan 8 Asts: Passiwan 8		Pts: Hawkins 16; Rebs: Hawkins 19; Asts: Sanz Londono 7

Basketball Arena, London
Referees: Sergio Giordano (CAN)

1 September 2012
19:00

Report

Great Britain	81–41	Colombia
Scoring by quarter: 25–13, 21–8, 18–11, 17–9
Pts: Bywater 21; Rebs: Sagar 11; Asts: Bywater 8		Pts: Sanz Londoño 14; Rebs: Hawkins 12; Asts: Leep Ipema, Chaparro 3

North Greenwich Arena, London
Referees: Shu Fei Hsieh (TPE)

2 September 2012
10:45

Report

Colombia	49–63	Japan
Scoring by quarter: 14–22, 11–13, 8–13, 16–15
Pts: Sanz Londoño 14; Rebs: Hawkins 17; Asts: Sanz Londoño, Chaparro 5		Pts: Fujimoto 27; Rebs: Fujimoto 14; Asts: Fujii, Kozai 7

North Greenwich Arena, London
Referees: Juan Uruñuela (ESP)

3 September 2012
10:45

Report

Canada	68–42	Colombia
Scoring by quarter: 21–8, 21–16, 13–4, 13–14
Pts: Durepos 18; Rebs: Johnson 6 Asts: Hedges 6		Pts: Hawkins 12; Rebs: Londoño 9 Asts: Chaparro 6

North Greenwich Arena, London
Referees: Philip Haines (AUS)

11th/12th place match

5 September 2012
8:30

Report

South Africa	36–83	Colombia
Scoring by quarter: 11–18, 7–19, 4–22, 14–24
Pts: Nortje 14; Rebs: Nortje 7 Asts: Nortje 4		Pts: Sanz Londoño 30; Rebs: Hawkins 16; Asts: Sanz Londoño 6

North Greenwich Arena, London
Referees: Philip Haines (AUS)
