= Colombia at the 2008 Summer Paralympics =

- IPC code: COL
- NPC: Colombian Paralympic Committee
- Website: www.cpc.org.co (in Spanish)

in Beijing
- Competitors: 12 in 6 sports
- Medals Ranked 60th: Gold 0 Silver 1 Bronze 1 Total 2

Summer Paralympics appearances (overview)
- 1976; 1980; 1984; 1988; 1992; 1996; 2000; 2004; 2008; 2012; 2016; 2020; 2024

Colombia sent a delegation to compete at the 2008 Summer Paralympics in Beijing, China.

== Medalists ==
| Medal | Name | Sport | Event |
|---|---|---|---|
| Silver | Elkin Serna | Athletics | Men's marathon T12 |
| Bronze | Moisés Fuentes | Swimming | Men's 100 metre breaststroke SB4 |

== Sports ==
=== Athletics ===
==== Men's track ====
| Athlete | Class | Event | Heats | | Final | |
| Athlete | Class | Event | Result | Rank | Result | Rank |
|---|---|---|---|---|---|---|
| Elkin Serna | T12 | 10000m | — | | 32:39.24 | 4 |
| Elkin Serna | T12 | Marathon | — | | 2:31:16 | 2nd place, silver medalist(s) |

=== Cycling ===
==== Men's road ====
| Athlete | Event | Time | Rank |
|---|---|---|---|
| Luis Chacon | Men's road race LC1/LC2/CP4 | 1:56:17 | 19 |
| Luis Chacon | Men's road time trial LC2 | 35:56.74 | 6 |
| Kennedy Jacome | Men's road race LC1/LC2/CP4 | 2:00:34 | 22 |
| Kennedy Jacome | Men's road time trial LC1 | 39:09.37 | 14 |
| Carlos Arciniegas; Juan Carreno (pilot) | Men's road race B&VI 1-3 | DNS | |
| Carlos Arciniegas; Juan Carreno (pilot) | Men's road time trial B&VI1-3 | 36:08.97 | 16 |

==== Men's track ====
| Athlete | Event | Qualification | | Quarterfinals | | Final | |
| Athlete | Event | Time | Rank | Time | Rank | Opposition Time | Rank |
|---|---|---|---|---|---|---|---|
| Luis Chacon | Men's individual pursuit LC2 | 5:15.15 | 7 | did not advance | | | |
| Luis Chacon | Men's time trial LC2 | — | | | | 1:16.92 | 9 |
| Kennedy Jacome | Men's individual pursuit LC1 | 5:16.90 | 14 | did not advance | | | |
| Kennedy Jacome | Men's time trial LC1 | — | | | | 1:14.69 | 11 |
| Carlos Arciniegas; Juan Carreno (pilot) | Men's individual pursuit B&VI 1-3 | 4:47.730 | 12 | did not advance | | | |
| Carlos Arciniegas; Juan Carreno (pilot) | Men's sprint B&VI 1-3 | 11.502 | 7 | Demery (AUS) / Hopkins (AUS) | L 0-2 | 7/8th place matches Nattkemper (ARG) / Ferrari (ARG); W 11.627 | 7 |
| Carlos Arciniegas; Juan Carreno (pilot) | Men's time trial B&VI 1-3 | — | | | | 1:08.867 | 11 |

=== Judo ===
| Athlete | Event | First Round | Quarterfinals | Semifinals | Repechage round 1 | Repechage round 2 | Final/ Bronze medal contest |
| Athlete | Event | Opposition Result | Opposition Result | Opposition Result | Opposition Result | Opposition Result | Opposition Result |
|---|---|---|---|---|---|---|---|
| Juan Pablo Castellanos | Men's 60kg | Hirose (JPN); L 0000–1010 | did not advance | | | | |

=== Powerlifting ===
==== Men ====
| Athlete | Event | Result | Rank |
|---|---|---|---|
| Jainer Cantillo | 60kg | 160.0 | 6 |

=== Swimming ===
==== Men ====
| Athlete | Class | Event | Heats | | Final | |
| Athlete | Class | Event | Result | Rank | Result | Rank |
|---|---|---|---|---|---|---|
| Moisés Fuentes | S5 | 100m freestyle | 1:30.90 | 9 | did not advance | |
| Moisés Fuentes | SB4 | 100m breaststroke | 1:41.99 | 3 Q | 1:42.04 | 3rd place, bronze medalist(s) |
| Miguel Otero | S12 | 100m butterfly | 1:16.99 | 13 | did not advance | |

==== Women ====
| Athlete | Class | Event | Heats | | Final | |
| Athlete | Class | Event | Result | Rank | Result | Rank |
|---|---|---|---|---|---|---|
| Naiver Ramos | SB4 | 100m breaststroke | 2:20.93 | 8 Q | 2:28.28 | 8 |

=== Wheelchair tennis ===
| Athlete | Event | Round of 64 | Round of 32 | Round of 16 | Quarterfinals | Semifinals | Finals |
| Athlete | Event | Opposition Result | Opposition Result | Opposition Result | Opposition Result | Opposition Result | Opposition Result |
|---|---|---|---|---|---|---|---|
| Eliecer Oquendo | Men's singles | Li B (CHN); L 5-7, 6-3, 4-6 | did not advance | | | | |
| Johana Martínez | Women's singles | — | Sevenans (BEL); L 0-6, 0-6 | did not advance | | | |

== See also ==
- Colombia at the Paralympics
- Colombia at the 2008 Summer Olympics
