= Colombia at the 2004 Summer Paralympics =

- IPC code: COL
- NPC: Colombian Paralympic Committee
- Website: www.cpc.org.co (in Spanish)

in Athens
- Competitors: 5 in 3 sports
- Flag bearer: Martin Mosso
- Medals: Gold 0 Silver 0 Bronze 0 Total 0

Summer Paralympics appearances (overview)
- 1976; 1980; 1984; 1988; 1992; 1996; 2000; 2004; 2008; 2012; 2016; 2020; 2024

Colombia competed at the 2004 Summer Paralympics in Athens, Greece. The team included 5 athletes, four men and one woman, but won no medals.

== Sports ==
=== Athletics ===
==== Men's track ====
Athlete	Class	Event	Heats		Semifinal		Final	
Athlete	Class	Event	Result	Rank	Result	Rank	Result	Rank
Martin Mosso	T11	10000m	—				36:39.14	10
Martin Mosso	T11	Marathon	—				DNF	

=== Cycling ===
==== Men's road ====
Athlete	Event	Time	Rank
Robinson Martinez	Men's road race/time trial LC3	2:02:58	9

=== Swimming ===
==== Men ====
Athlete	Class	Event	Heats		Final	
Athlete	Class	Event	Result	Rank	Result	Rank
Moisés Fuentes	S5	100m freestyle	1:30.04	8 Q	1:31.52	8

==== Women ====
Athlete	Class	Event	Heats		Final	
Athlete	Class	Event	Result	Rank	Result	Rank
Naiver Ramos	SB4	100m breaststroke	2:28.04	11	did not advance	

== See also ==
- Colombia at the Paralympics
- Colombia at the 2004 Summer Olympics
