= Colombia at the 2016 Summer Paralympics =

- IPC code: COL
- NPC: Colombian Paralympic Committee
- Website: www.cpc.org.co (in Spanish)

in Rio de Janeiro
- Competitors: 39 in 6 sports
- Flag bearer: Nelson Crispín
- Medals Ranked 37th: Gold 2 Silver 5 Bronze 10 Total 17

Summer Paralympics appearances (overview)
- 1976; 1980; 1984; 1988; 1992; 1996; 2000; 2004; 2008; 2012; 2016; 2020; 2024

Colombia competed at the 2016 Summer Paralympics in Rio de Janeiro, Brazil, from 7 to 18 September 2016.

== Delegation ==
Colombia sent a team of 39 athletes, 26 men and 13 women, and 1 official to the 2016 Summer Paralympics.

== Disability classifications ==
Every participant at the Paralympics has their disability grouped into one of five disability categories; amputation, the condition may be congenital or sustained through injury or illness; cerebral palsy; wheelchair athletes, there is often overlap between this and other categories; visual impairment, including blindness; Les autres, any physical disability that does not fall strictly under one of the other categories, for example dwarfism or multiple sclerosis. Each Paralympic sport then has its own classifications, dependent upon the specific physical demands of competition. Events are given a code, made of numbers and letters, describing the type of event and classification of the athletes competing. Some sports, such as athletics, divide athletes by both the category and severity of their disabilities, other sports, for example swimming, group competitors from different categories together, the only separation being based on the severity of the disability.

== Medalists ==
| Medal | Name | Sport | Event | Date |
|---|---|---|---|---|
| Gold | Carlos Serrano Zárate | Swimming | Men's 100 metre breaststroke SB7 | September 10 |
| Gold | Mauricio Valencia | Athletics | Men's javelin throw F34 | September 15 |
| Silver | Nelson Crispín | Swimming | Men's 50 metre freestyle S6 | September 10 |
| Silver | Luis Fernando Lucumí Villegas | Athletics | Men's javelin throw F38 | September 15 |
| Silver | Nelson Crispín | Swimming | Men's 100 metre breaststroke SB6 | September 15 |
| Silver | Carlos Serrano Zárate | Swimming | Men's 100 metre freestyle S7 | September 16 |
| Silver | Nelson Crispín | Swimming | Men's 100 metre freestyle S6 | September 17 |
| Bronze | Martha Liliana Hernández Florián | Athletics | Women's 100 metre T36 | September 9 |
| Bronze | Carlos Serrano Zárate | Swimming | Men's 50 metre Butterfly S7 | September 9 |
| Bronze | Diego Germán Dueñas | Cycling | Men's individual pursuit C4 | September 10 |
| Bronze | Edwin Fabián Mátiz Ruiz | Cycling | Men's individual pursuit C5 | September 10 |
| Bronze | Mauricio Valencia | Athletics | Men's shot put F34 | September 10 |
| Bronze | Moisés Fuentes | Swimming | Men's 100 metre breaststroke SB4 | September 11 |
| Bronze | Women's relay team Colombia | Athletics | Women's 4x100 metre Relay T11-13 | September 14 |
| Bronze | Néstor Javier Ayala | Cycling | Men's Road Race T1-2 | September 16 |
| Bronze | Maritza Arango Buitrago | Athletics | Women's 1500 metre - T11 | September 17 |
| Bronze | Weiner Díaz | Athletics | Men's 400 metre - T38 | September 17 |

== Cycling ==
With one pathway for qualification being one highest ranked NPCs on the UCI Para-Cycling male and female Nations Ranking Lists on 31 December 2014, Colombia qualified for the 2016 Summer Paralympics in Rio, assuming they continued to meet all other eligibility requirements.

== Wheelchair tennis ==
Colombia qualified one competitors in the men's single event, Eliecer Oquendo. This spot was a result of a Bipartite Commission Invitation place. Colombia also earned a spot in the women's singles event. Angelica Bernal got the spot as a result of a Bipartite Commission Invitation place.

== See also ==
- Colombia at the 2016 Summer Olympics
