= Athletics at the 2023 Parapan American Games – Men's 400 metres T38 =

Men's 400 metres T38 at the 2023 Parapan American Games
- Venue: Mario Recordón Athletics Training Center
- Dates: November 21
- Competitors: 6 from 5 nations
- Winning time: 51.14

Medalists
1st place, gold medalist(s)		Ryan Medrano	United States
2nd place, silver medalist(s)		José Rodolfo Chessani	Mexico
3rd place, bronze medalist(s)		Dixon Hooker	Colombia

The men's T38 400 metres competition of the athletics events at the 2023 Parapan American Games was held on November 21 at the Mario Recordón Athletics Training Center within the Julio Martínez National Stadium of Santiago, Chile.

== Records ==
Prior to this competition, the existing world and Pan American Games records were as follows:

World record	Jaydin Blackwell (USA)	48.49	Paris, France	July 13, 2023
Parapan American Games record	Dixon Hooker (COL)	52.85	Lima, Peru	August 27, 2019

== Schedule ==
Date	Time	Round
November 21, 2023	18:07	Final

== Results ==
All times shown are in seconds.

KEY:	q	Fastest non-qualifiers	Q	Qualified	PR	Parapan Games record	NR	National record	SB	Seasonal best	DQ	Disqualified

=== Final ===
The results were as follows:

Rank	Lane	Name	Nationality	Time	Notes
1st place, gold medalist(s)	4	Ryan Medrano	United States	51.14	PR
2nd place, silver medalist(s)	5	José Rodolfo Chessani	Mexico	51.66	
3rd place, bronze medalist(s)	6	Dixon Hooker	Colombia	52.25	SB
4	3	Fernando Hernandez	Mexico	56.06	
5	7	David Jorquera	Chile	56.63	
6	8	Carlos Castillo	Nicaragua	1:01.99	
