= Athletics at the 2023 Parapan American Games – Men's 100 metres T38 =

Men's 100 metres T38 at the 2023 Parapan American Games
- Venue: Mario Recordón Athletics Training Center
- Dates: November 22
- Competitors: 4 from 4 nations
- Winning time: 11.20

Medalists
1st place, gold medalist(s)		Ryan Medrano	United States
2nd place, silver medalist(s)		Santiago Solís	Colombia
3rd place, bronze medalist(s)		José Rodolfo Chessani	Mexico

The men's T38 100 metres competition of the athletics events at the 2023 Parapan American Games was held on November 22 at the Mario Recordón Athletics Training Center within the Julio Martínez National Stadium of Santiago, Chile.

== Records ==
Prior to this competition, the existing world and Pan American Games records were as follows:

World record	Jianwen Hu (CHN)	10.74	Rio de Janeiro, Brazil	September 13, 2016
Parapan American Games record	Edson Pinheiro (BRA)	11.45	Lima, Peru	August 25, 2019
Americas record	Jaydin Blackwell (USA)	10.87	Paris, France	July 9, 2023

== Schedule ==
Date	Time	Round
November 22, 2023	19:37	Final

== Results ==
All times shown are in seconds.

KEY:	q	Fastest non-qualifiers	Q	Qualified	PR	Parapan Games record	NR	National record	SB	Seasonal best	DQ	Disqualified

=== Final ===
The results were as follows:
Wind: +1.2 m/s

Rank	Lane	Name	Nationality	Time	Notes
1st place, gold medalist(s)	4	Ryan Medrano	United States	11.20	PR
2nd place, silver medalist(s)	3	Santiago Solís	Colombia	11.36	
3rd place, bronze medalist(s)	6	José Rodolfo Chessani	Mexico	11.56	
4	6	David Jorquera	Chile	12.49	
