= Colombia at the 1980 Summer Paralympics =

- IPC code: COL
- NPC: Colombian Paralympic Committee
- Website: www.cpc.org.co (in Spanish)

in Arnhem
- Competitors: 11
- Medals Ranked 31st: Gold 1 Silver 0 Bronze 1 Total 2

Summer Paralympics appearances (overview)
- 1976; 1980; 1984; 1988; 1992; 1996; 2000; 2004; 2008; 2012; 2016; 2020; 2024

Colombia competed at the 1980 Summer Paralympics in Arnhem, Netherlands. Eleven competitors from Colombia won two medals (one gold and one bronze), and finished joint 31st in the medal table with Iceland.

== See also ==
- Colombia at the Paralympics
- Colombia at the 1980 Summer Olympics
