= Colombia at the 1992 Summer Paralympics =

- IPC code: COL
- NPC: Colombian Paralympic Committee
- Website: www.cpc.org.co (in Spanish)

in Barcelona
- Competitors: 6
- Medals: Gold 0 Silver 0 Bronze 0 Total 0

Summer Paralympics appearances (overview)
- 1976; 1980; 1984; 1988; 1992; 1996; 2000; 2004; 2008; 2012; 2016; 2020; 2024

Colombia competed at the 1992 Summer Paralympics in Barcelona, Spain. 6 competitors from Colombia won no medals and so did not place in the medal table.

== See also ==
- Colombia at the Paralympics
- Colombia at the 1992 Summer Olympics
