= Athletics at the 2024 Summer Paralympics – Men's 400 metres T37 =

Men's 400 metres T37 at the XVII Paralympic Games
- Venue: Stade de France, Paris, France
- Dates: 3 September 2024 (round 1); 4 September 2024 (final)

Medalists
| 1st place, gold medalist(s) | | Andrei Vdovin | Neutral Paralympic Athletes |
| 2nd place, silver medalist(s) | | Bartolomeu da Silva Chaves | Brazil |
| 3rd place, bronze medalist(s) | | Amen Allah Tissaoui | Tunisia |

400 metres at the 2024 Summer Paralympics
Men · T11 · T12 · T13 · T20 · T36 · T37 · T38 · T47 · T52 · T53 · T54 · T62
Women · T11 · T12 · T13 · T20 · T37 · T38 · T47 · T53 · T54 ·

The Men's 400 metres T37 at the 2024 Summer Paralympics took place on 3 and 4 September at the Stade de France in Paris.

== Records ==
| World Record | Andrei Vdovin (RPC) | 49.34 | (Japan) Tokyo | 1 September 2021 |
| Paralympic Record | Andrei Vdovin (RPC) | 49.34 | (Japan) Tokyo | 1 September 2021 |

| Area | Time | Athlete | Location | Date |
|---|---|---|---|---|
| Africa | | | | |
| America | | | | |
| Asia | | | | |
| Europe | | | | |
| Oceania | | | | |

== Classification ==
The T37 category is for ambulant athletes with cerebral palsy. These athletes have movement and coordination problems on one half of their body. They have good ability in their dominant side of their body (ie hemiplegia).

== Results ==
=== Round 1 ===
The semifinals were held on 3 September 2024 with the first 3 in each heat (Q) and the next 2 fastest (q) advance to the Final.

==== Heat 1 ====
| Rank | Lane | Athlete | Nation | Time | Notes |
|---|---|---|---|---|---|
| 1 | 7 | Bartolomeu da Silva Chaves | Brazil | 52.34 | Q |
| 2 | 4 | Mykola Raiskyi | Ukraine | 52.53 | Q, PB |
| 3 | 6 | Anton Feoktistov | Neutral Paralympic Athletes | 52.56 | Q |
| 4 | 5 | Yeferson Suárez | Colombia | 52.73 | q |
| 5 | 8 | Sofiane Hamdi | Algeria | 53.46 | SB |

==== Heat 2 ====
| Rank | Lane | Athlete | Nation | Time | Notes |
|---|---|---|---|---|---|
| 1 | 8 | Amen Allah Tissaoui | Tunisia | 51.59 | Q |
| 2 | 6 | Yaroslav Okapinskyi | Ukraine | 52.04 | Q, PB |
| 3 | 5 | Andrei Vdovin | Neutral Paralympic Athletes | 52.15 | Q |
| 4 | 4 | Michal Kotkowski | Poland | 52.45 | q |
| — | 7 | Petrus Karuli | Namibia | DQ | R18.2(c) |

=== Final ===
The final in this classification took place on 4 September 2024, at 11:05:

| Rank | Lane | Name | Nationality | Time | Notes |
|---|---|---|---|---|---|
| 1st place, gold medalist(s) | 9 | Andrei Vdovin | Neutral Paralympic Athletes | 50.27 | SB |
| 2nd place, silver medalist(s) | 6 | Bartolomeu da Silva Chaves | Brazil | 50.39 | PB |
| 3rd place, bronze medalist(s) | 8 | Amen Allah Tissaoui | Tunisia | 50.50 | AR |
| 4 | 7 | Mykola Raiskyi | Ukraine | 51.79 | PB |
| 5 | 2 | Michal Kotkowski | Poland | 51.83 | SB |
| 6 | 5 | Yaroslav Okapinskyi | Ukraine | 51.99 | SB |
| 7 | 3 | Yeferson Suárez | Colombia | 52.49 | |
| 8 | 4 | Anton Feoktistov | Neutral Paralympic Athletes | 52.54 | |
