= Chessani =

Chessani is a surname. Notable people with the surname include:

- Jeffrey Chessani, former lieutenant colonel in the U.S. Marine Corps whose unit was involved in the Haditha massacre
- José Rodolfo Chessani (born 1998), Mexican Paralympic athlete
