= Athletics at the 2023 Parapan American Games – Men's 400 metres T37 =

Men's 400 metres T37 at the 2023 Parapan American Games
- Venue: Mario Recordón Athletics Training Center
- Dates: November 22
- Competitors: 6 from 5 nations
- Winning time: 52.82

Medalists
1st place, gold medalist(s)		Yeferson Suárez	Colombia
2nd place, silver medalist(s)		Andrés Malambo	Colombia
3rd place, bronze medalist(s)		Carlos Rodríguez	Mexico

The men's T37 400 metres competition of the athletics events at the 2023 Parapan American Games was held on November 22 at the Mario Recordón Athletics Training Center within the Julio Martínez National Stadium of Santiago, Chile.

== Records ==
Prior to this competition, the existing world and Pan American Games records were as follows:

World record	[[]] (25x17px)	[[]], [[]]
Parapan American Games record	[[]] (25x17px)	[[]], [[]]
Americas record	[[]] (25x17px)	[[]], [[]]

== Schedule ==
Date	Time	Round
November 22, 2023	15:34	Final

== Results ==
All times shown are in seconds.

KEY:	q	Fastest non-qualifiers	Q	Qualified	PR	Parapan Games record	NR	National record	SB	Seasonal best	DQ	Disqualified

=== Final ===
The results were as follows:

Rank	Lane	Name	Nationality	Time	Notes
1st place, gold medalist(s)	3	Yeferson Suárez	Colombia	52.82	
2nd place, silver medalist(s)	6	Andrés Malambo	Colombia	53.25	SB
3rd place, bronze medalist(s)	5	Carlos Rodríguez	Mexico	56.23	SB
4	7	David Pleitez	El Salvador	1:00.75	SB
5	8	Simon Detmer	United States	1:04.09	
6	4	Bartolomeu Chaves	Brazil	1:15.96	
