= Ryan Medrano =

American para athlete (born 1997)

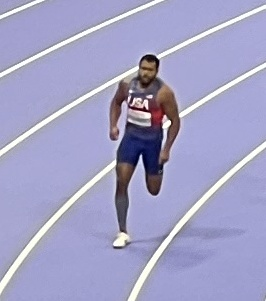
- Medrano at the 2024 Paralympic Games

Personal information
- Nationality: United States
- Born: August 26, 1997 (age 28) Savannah, Georgia, U.S.
- Height: 6'0
- Weight: 195

Sport
- Sport: Para-athletics
- Disability class: T38
- Event(s): 100 metres 400 metres Long jump
Medal record
Men's para-athletics
Representing the United States
Paralympic Games
| Silver medal – second place | 2024 Paris | 100 m T38 |
| Silver medal – second place | 2024 Paris | 400 m T38 |
World Championships
| Silver medal – second place | 2024 Kobe | 400 metres T38 |
| Silver medal – second place | 2025 New Delhi | 100 m T38 |
Parapan American Games
| Gold medal – first place | 2023 Santiago | 100 metres T38 |
| Gold medal – first place | 2023 Santiago | 400 metres T38 |
| Bronze medal – third place | 2023 Santiago | 4 × 100 metre relay |

Ryan Medrano (born August 26, 1997) is an American Paralympian track and field athlete. He represented the United States at the 2024 Summer Paralympics where he won two silver medals. Additionally he is a Parapan American Games gold medalist and a World Para Athletics Championships silver medalist. He competed on the 43rd season of Survivor.

== Early life ==
Medrano was born three months early, which resulted in fluid in the cerebellum of his brain. Additionally he was born with cerebral palsy.

== Survivor ==
In fall of 2022 Medrano appeared on the 43rd season of Survivor. He was voted off on day 17 and was the third member of the jury. While competing on the show he met 2020 Paralympic athlete Noelle Lambert, who informed him that cerebral palsy was a recognized disability sport classification and he could compete internationally as a para-athlete.

== Para athletic career ==
Medrano began para athletic training in December 2022. In July of 2023 Medrano competed at his first World Championships, finishing fifth in the 400 metres and seventh in the long jump. In November he competed at the 2023 Parapan American Games. While there he won gold in the 100 metres and 400 metres.

Medrano competed at the 2024 World Para Athletics Championships in Kobe, Japan, where he won silver in the 400 metres behind fellow American Jaydin Blackwell. He qualified to compete at the 2024 Paralympic Games. He ended up winning silver in 100 metres and 400 metres, once again behind Blackwell in both.

At the 2025 World Championships held in New Delhi, Medrano won silver in the 100 metres, once again behind Blackwell, placed fourth in the 400 metres, and fifth in the long jump.
