= 2024 World Para Athletics Championships – Men's 400 metres =

The men's 400 metres at the 2024 World Para Athletics Championships were held in Kobe.

== Medalists ==
Serkan Yıldırım No class and DQ. Gold for MAR, Silver for TUN and bronze for MAR.

Event	Gold	Silver	Bronze
T11	Chris Kinda; Namibia	Eduardo Manuel Uceda Novas; Spain	Felipe Gomes; Brazil
T12	Serkan Yıldırım; Turkey	Mouncef Bouja; Morocco	Rouay Jebabli; Tunisia
T13	Skander Djamil Athmani; Algeria	Ryota Fukunaga; Japan	Buinder Bermúdez; Colombia
T20	Samuel Oliveira Conceição; Brazil	Jhon Obando; Colombia	Muhammad Ammar Aiman Nor Azmi; Malaysia
T34	Mohamed Hammadi; United Arab Emirates	Walid Ktila; Tunisia	Henry Manni; Finland
T36	William Stedman; New Zealand	James Turner; Australia	Fakhr Eddine Thelaidjia; Algeria
T37	Bartolomeu da Silva Chaves; Brazil	Andrei Vdovin; Neutral Paralympic Athletes (NPA)	Amen Allah Tissaoui; Tunisia
T38	Jaydin Blackwell; United States	Ryan Medrano; United States	José Rodolfo Chessani; Mexico
T47	Ayoub Sadni; Morocco	Collen Mahlalela; South Africa	Marufjon Murodulloev; Uzbekistan
T52	Maxime Carabin; Belgium	Tomoki Sato; Japan	Tatsuya Ito; Japan
T53	Pierre Fairbank; France	Yoo Byung-hoon; South Korea	Mohamed Nidhal Khelifi; Tunisia
T54	Hu Yang; China	Dai Yunqiang; China	Zhang Ying; China
T62	Johannes Floors; Germany	Hunter Woodhall; United States	Olivier Hendriks; Netherlands
