= Athletics at the 2016 Summer Paralympics – Women's 100 metres T36 =

Women's 100 metres T36 at the XV Paralympic Games
- Venue: Estádio Olímpico João Havelange
- Dates: heats_date–9 September 2016
- Competitors: 9 from 8 nations

Medalists
1st place, gold medalist(s)		Yanina Andrea Martinez	Argentina
2nd place, silver medalist(s)		Claudia Nicoleitzik	Germany
3rd place, bronze medalist(s)		Martha Liliana Hernández Florián	Colombia

The T36 category is for ambulant athletes with cerebral palsy. These athletes do not have the capacity to remain still and they show involuntary movements with all four limbs affected. They usually walk without assistive devices.

The Athletics at the 2016 Summer Paralympics – Women's 100 metres T36 event at the 2016 Paralympic Games took place on 9 September 2016, at the Estádio Olímpico João Havelange.

== Heats ==
=== Heat 1 ===
17:30 8 September 2016:

Rank	Lane	Bib	Name	Nationality	Reaction	Time	Notes
1	6	109	Tascitha Oliveira Cruz	Brazil		14.53	Q
2	4	214	Martha Liliana Hernández Florián	Colombia		14.82	Q
3	5	493	Min Jae Jeon	South Korea		15.15	Q
4	3	551	Sandra Fonseca Solis	Mexico		16.22	q
5	7	831	Syrine Bessaidi	Tunisia		17.27	

=== Heat 2 ===
17:37 8 September 2016:

Rank	Lane	Bib	Name	Nationality	Reaction	Time	Notes
1	7	22	Yanina Andrea Martinez	Argentina		14.50	Q
2	5	372	Claudia Nicoleitzik	Germany		14.71	Q
3	4	219	Daniela Rodriguez Angulo	Colombia		15.29	Q
4	6	399	Kwok Fan Yam	Hong Kong		16.15	q

== Final ==
10:43 9 September 2016:

Rank	Lane	Bib	Name	Nationality	Reaction	Time	Notes
1st place, gold medalist(s)	5	22	Yanina Andrea Martinez	Argentina		14.46	
2nd place, silver medalist(s)	6	372	Claudia Nicoleitzik	Germany		14.64	
3rd place, bronze medalist(s)	4	214	Martha Liliana Hernández Florián	Colombia		14.71	
4	9	493	Min Jae Jeon	South Korea		14.88	
5	8	219	Daniela Rodriguez Angulo	Colombia		15.23	
6	7	109	Tascitha Oliveira Cruz	Brazil		15.28	
7	2	551	Sandra Fonseca Solis	Mexico		16.14	
8	3	399	Kwok Fan Yam	Hong Kong		16.48	
