= Nicaragua at the 2023 Parapan American Games =

- Flag of Nicaragua
- IPC code: NIC
- NPC: National Paralympic Committee of Nicaragua
- Website: www.paralympic.org/nicaragua

in Santiago, Chile 17 November 2023 – 26 November 2023
- Competitors: 2 in 2 sports
- Flag bearers: Carlos Castillo; Arlen Hidalgo
- Medals: Gold 0 Silver 0 Bronze 0 Total 0

Parapan American Games appearances
- 2007; 2011; 2015; 2019; 2023

Nicaragua is scheduled to compete in the 2023 Parapan American Games in Santiago, Chile from 17 November to 26 November 2023. This was Nicaragua's fifth appearance at the Parapan American Games, having first competed in the 2007 edition.

Paralympic athletes Carlos Castillo and Arlen Hidalgo were the country's flagbearers during the opening ceremony.

== Competitors ==
The following is the list of number of competitors (per gender) participating at the games per sport/discipline.

Sport	Men	Women	Total
Athletics	1	1	2
Total	1	1	2

== Athletics ==
Men

Track events

Athlete	Event	Semifinal		Final	
Athlete	Event	Result	Rank	Result	Rank
Carlos Castillo	400 m T38	—N/a		1:01.99	6
Carlos Castillo	1500 m T38	—N/a		4:57.50	4

Women

Track events

Athlete	Event	Semifinal		Final	
Athlete	Event	Result	Rank	Result	Rank
Arlen Hidalgo	400 m T11	DNS		—N/a	
Arlen Hidalgo	1500 m T11	—N/a		DSQ	

== See also ==
- Nicaragua at the 2023 Pan American Games
- Nicaragua at the 2024 Summer Paralympics
