= Athletics at the 2024 Summer Paralympics – Men's 400 metres T38 =

Men's 400 metres T38 at the XVII Paralympic Games
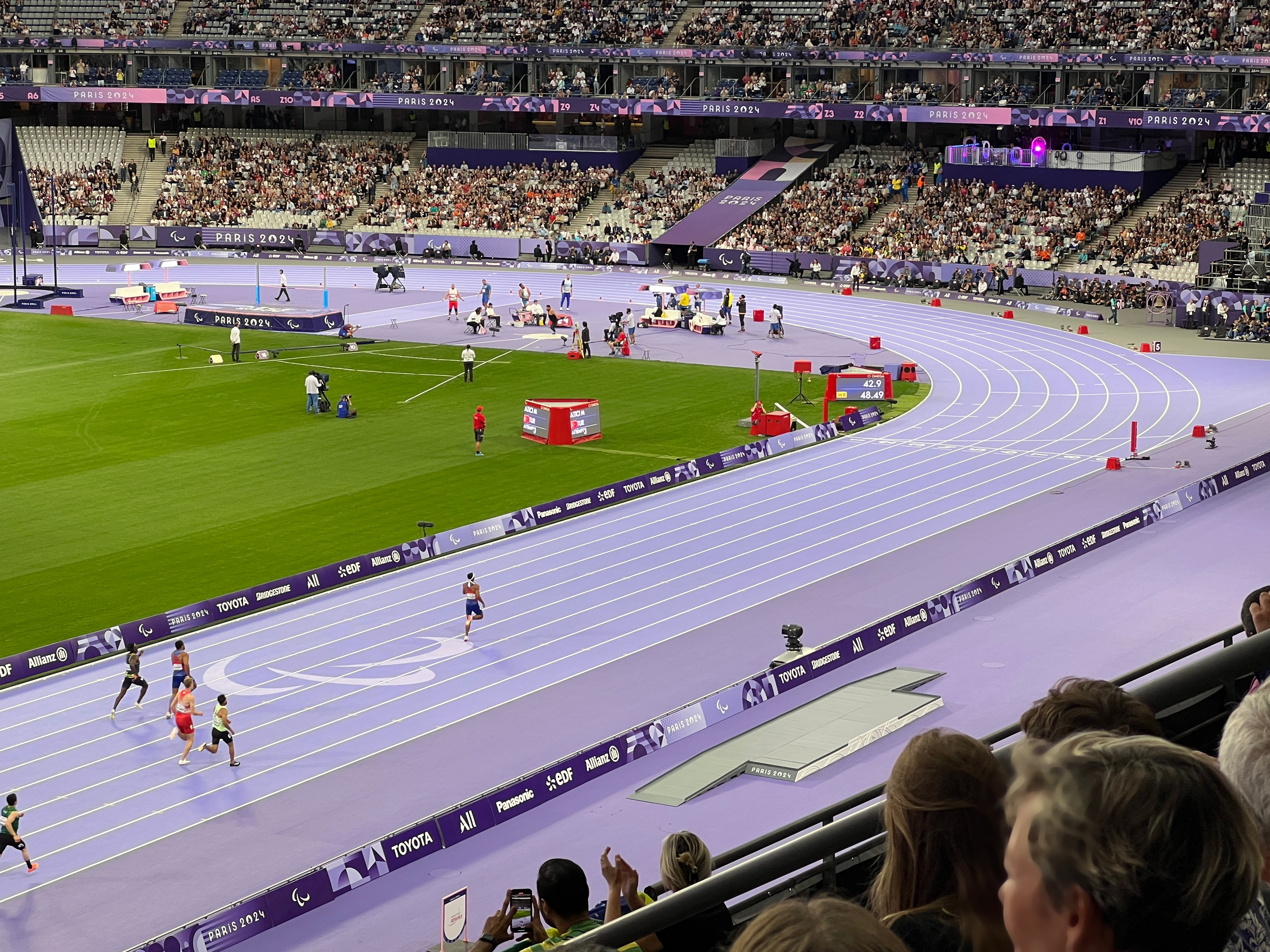
- Venue: Stade de France, Paris, France
- Dates: 3 September 2024 (final)
- Competitors: 8 from 7 nations
- Winning time: 48.49 PR, =WR

Medalists
1st place, gold medalist(s)		Jaydin Blackwell	United States
2nd place, silver medalist(s)		Ryan Medrano	United States
3rd place, bronze medalist(s)		Juan Campas	Colombia

400 metres at the 2024 Summer Paralympics
Men · T11 · T12 · T13 · T20 · T36 · T37 · T38 · T47 · T52 · T53 · T54 · T62
Women · T11 · T12 · T13 · T20 · T37 · T38 · T47 · T53 · T54 ·

The Men's 400 metres T38 at the 2024 Summer Paralympics took place 3 September at the Stade de France in Paris.

== Records ==
T35
World Record	Dmitrii Safronov (RPC)	56.61	(Switzerland) Nottwil	18 May 2014
Paralympic Record	J Rivero (ESP)	01:06.3	(United States) Atlanta	21 August 1996

Area	Time	Athlete	Location	Date
Africa				
America				
Asia				
Europe				
Oceania				

T38
World Record	Jaydin Blackwell (USA)	48.49	(France) Paris	13 July 2023
Paralympic Record	Dyan Buis (RSA)	49.46	(Brazil) Rio de Janeiro	17 September 2016

Area	Time	Athlete	Location	Date
Africa				
America				
Asia				
Europe				
Oceania				

== Classification ==
The T38 category is for ambulant athletes with cerebral palsy. T38 athletes have the mildest form of impairment caused by cerebral palsy, often in only one limb, and not affecting the ability to run, walk or jump freely, although impairing performance. T38 athletes may suffer minor co-ordination difficulties.

== Results ==
=== Final ===
This event went straight to final. The final in this classification took place on 3 September 2024, at 11:05:

Rank	Lane	Name	Nationality	Time	Notes
1st place, gold medalist(s)	6	Jaydin Blackwell	United States	48.49	PR, =WR
2nd place, silver medalist(s)	5	Ryan Medrano	United States	49.74	PB
3rd place, bronze medalist(s)	4	Juan Campas	Colombia	49.92	PB
4	8	Ali Al-Rikabi	Iraq	50.34	PB
5	7	Zachary Gingras	Canada	50.63	SB
6	9	José Rodolfo Chessani	Mexico	51.41	
7	3	Teófilo Freitas	Timor-Leste	55.18	SB
8	2	Carlos Alberto Castillo	Nicaragua	59.28	SB
