= Swimming at the 2008 Summer Paralympics – Men's 100 metre breaststroke SB4 =

Men's 100m Breaststroke SB4 at the XIII Paralympic Games
- Venue: Beijing National Aquatics Center
- Dates: 12 September
- Competitors: 13 from 9 nations
- Winning time: 1:36.61

Medalists
1st place, gold medalist(s)		Ricardo Ten	Spain
2nd place, silver medalist(s)		Daniel Dias	Brazil
3rd place, bronze medalist(s)		Moisés Fuentes	Colombia

The men's 100m breaststroke SB4 event at the 2008 Summer Paralympics took place at the Beijing National Aquatics Center on 12 September. There were two heats; the swimmers with the eight fastest times advanced to the final.

== Results ==
=== Heats ===
Competed from 10:00.

==== Heat 1 ====
Rank	Name	Nationality	Time	Notes
1	Moisés Fuentes	Colombia	1:41.99	Q
2	Ervin Kovács	Hungary	1:45.01	Q
3	Pablo Cimadevila	Spain	1:48.45	Q
4	Lee Kwon Sik	South Korea	1:52.39	Q
5	Dave Denniston	United States	1:53.23	
6	Francisco Avelino	Brazil	2:04.01	

==== Heat 2 ====
Rank	Name	Nationality	Time	Notes
1	Ricardo Ten	Spain	1:40.72	Q
2	Daniel Dias	Brazil	1:41.74	Q
3	Ivanildo Vasconcelos	Brazil	1:49.38	Q
4	Zeng Huabin	China	1:53.18	Q
5	Roy Perkins	United States	1:56.02	
6	Ariel Quassi	Argentina	1:56.09	
7	Vidal Dominguez	Mexico	2:05.17	

=== Final ===
Competed at 18:14.

Rank	Name	Nationality	Time	Notes
1st place, gold medalist(s)	Ricardo Ten	Spain	1:36.61	WR
2nd place, silver medalist(s)	Daniel Dias	Brazil	1:40.39	
3rd place, bronze medalist(s)	Moisés Fuentes	Colombia	1:42.04	
4	Ervin Kovács	Hungary	1:44.12	
5	Pablo Cimadevila	Spain	1:46.11	
6	Ivanildo Vasconcelos	Brazil	1:47.86	
7	Zeng Huabin	China	1:52.75	
8	Lee Kwon Sik	South Korea	2:13.37	

Q = qualified for final. WR = World Record.
