= Yeferson Suárez =

Colombian para athlete (born 2002)

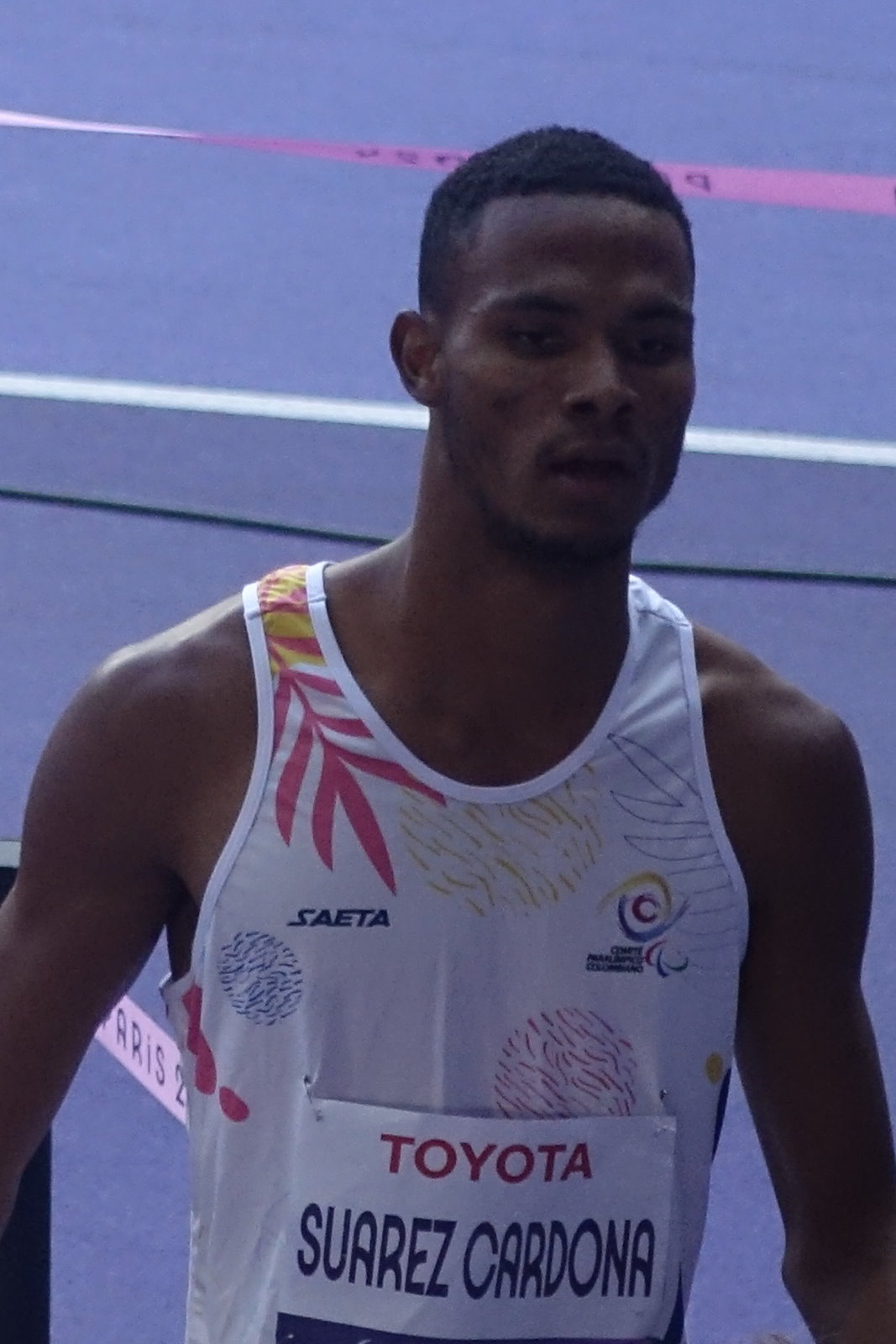
- Suárez at the 2024 Summer Paralympics

Personal information
- Full name: Yeferson Suárez Cardona
- Born: 16 February 2002 (age 24)

Sport
- Country: Colombia
- Sport: Para-athletics
- Disability class: T37
Medal record
Men's para-athletics
Representing Colombia
Event	1st	2nd	3rd
World Championships	0	0	1
Parapan American Games	1	0	0
Total	1	0	1
World Championships
Bronze medal – third place	2025 New Delhi	400 m T37
Parapan American Games
Gold medal – first place	2023 Santiago	400 m T37

Yeferson Suárez Cardona (born 16 February 2002) is a Colombian para athlete who competes in T37 sprint events. He represented Colombia at the 2024 Summer Paralympics.

== Career ==
Suárez competed at the 2023 Parapan American Games and won a gold medal in the 400 metres T37 event with a time of 52.82 seconds. He also finished in fourth place in the 100 metres T37 and 200 metres T37 events.

He represented Colombia at the 2024 Summer Paralympics and finished in seventh place in the 400 metres T37 event. He competed at the 2025 World Para Athletics Championships and won a bronze medal in the 400 metres T37 event with a time of 51.19 seconds.
