= Swimming at the 2024 Summer Paralympics – Men's 100 metre breaststroke SB8 =

Men's 100 metre breaststroke SB8 at the XVII Paralympic Games
- Venue: La Défense Arena
- Dates: 30 August 2024
- Competitors: 14 from 10 nations
- Winning time: 1:09.02

Medalists
| 1st place, gold medalist(s) | | Andrei Kalina | Neutral Paralympic Athletes |
| 2nd place, silver medalist(s) | | Yang Guanglong | China |
| 3rd place, bronze medalist(s) | | Carlos Serrano Zárate | Colombia |

The men's 100 metre breaststroke swimming (SB8) event at the 2024 Summer Paralympics took place on 30 August 2024, at the La Défense Arena in Paris.

== Records ==
Prior to the competition, the existing world and Paralympic records were as follows.

S7 records

| World Record | Carlos Serrano Zárate (COL) | 1:10.32 | Manchester, Great Britain | 6 August 2023 |
| Paralympic Record | Carlos Serrano Zárate (COL) | 1:12.01 | Tokyo, Japan | 1 September 2021 |

S8 records

| World Record | Andrei Kalina (RUS) | 1:07.01 | Beijing, China | 9 September 2008 |
| Paralympic Record | Andrei Kalina (RUS) | 1:07.01 | Beijing, China | 9 September 2008 |

== Results ==
=== Heats ===
The heats were started at 11:10.

| Rank | Heat | Lane | Name | Nationality | Class | Time | Notes |
|---|---|---|---|---|---|---|---|
| 1 | 2 | 4 | Andrei Kalina | Neutral Paralympic Athletes | SB8 | 1:10.61 | Q |
| 2 | 2 | 6 | Yang Guanglong | China | SB8 | 1:11.13 | Q |
| 3 | 2 | 3 | Óscar Salguero | Spain | SB8 | 1:11.64 | Q |
| 4 | 1 | 4 | Carlos Serrano Zárate | Colombia | SB7 | 1:12.12 | Q |
| 5 | 1 | 3 | Timothy Hodge | Australia | SB8 | 1:12.17 | Q |
| 6 | 2 | 5 | Daniil Smirnov | Neutral Paralympic Athletes | SB8 | 1:12.56 | Q |
| 7 | 1 | 5 | Vicente Almonacid | Chile | SB8 | 1:12.60 | Q |
| 8 | 1 | 6 | Xu Haijiao | China | SB8 | 1:12.66 | Q |
| 9 | 1 | 2 | Joshua Willmer | New Zealand | SB8 | 1:12.73 | |
| 10 | 1 | 7 | Federico Morlacchi | Italy | SB8 | 1:13.00 | |
| 11 | 2 | 2 | Robin Liksor | Estonia | SB8 | 1:13.65 | |
| 12 | 2 | 7 | Andreas Onea | Austria | SB8 | 1:13.71 | |
| 13 | 2 | 1 | Carlos Martínez | Spain | SB8 | 1:17.25 | |
| | 1 | 1 | Li Ting | China | SB8 | Disqualified | |

=== Final ===
The final was held at 20:14.

| Rank | Lane | Name | Nationality | Class | Time | Notes |
|---|---|---|---|---|---|---|
| 1st place, gold medalist(s) | 4 | Andrei Kalina | Neutral Paralympic Athletes | SB8 | 1:09.02 | |
| 2nd place, silver medalist(s) | 5 | Yang Guanglong | China | SB8 | 1:09.83 | AS |
| 3rd place, bronze medalist(s) | 6 | Carlos Serrano Zárate | Colombia | SB7 | 1:10.55 | PR |
| 4 | 7 | Daniil Smirnov | Neutral Paralympic Athletes | SB8 | 1:11.59 | |
| 5 | 2 | Timothy Hodge | Australia | SB8 | 1:12.11 | |
| 6 | 3 | Óscar Salguero | Spain | SB8 | 1:12.36 | |
| | 1 | Vicente Almonacid | Chile | SB8 | Disqualified | |
| | 8 | Xu Haijiao | China | SB8 | Disqualified | |
