= Athletics at the 2024 Summer Paralympics – Men's 100 metres T38 =

Men's 100 metres T38 at the XVII Paralympic Games
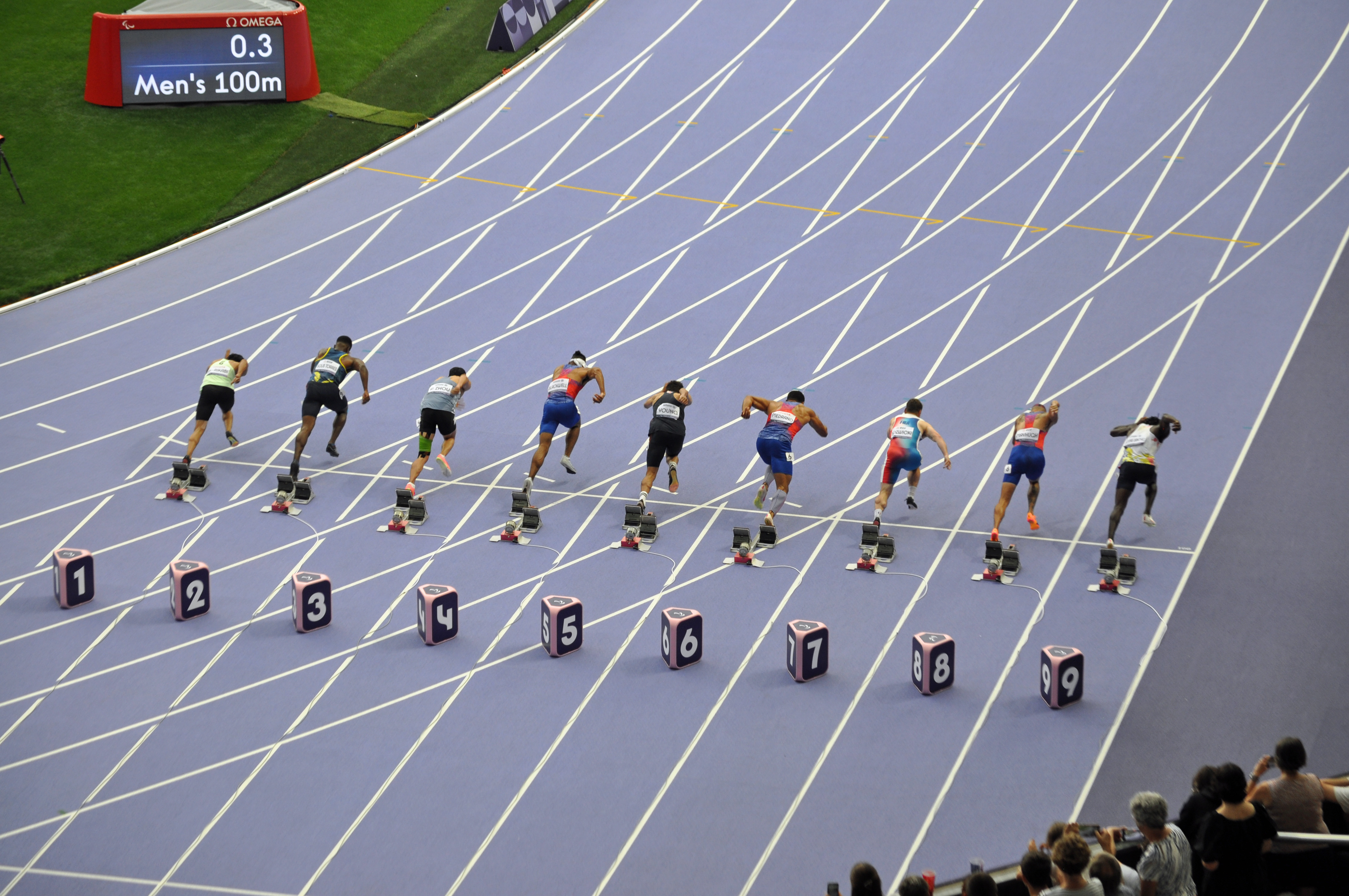
- Start of the race.
- Venue: Stade de France
- Dates: 31 August 2024
- Competitors: 9 from 6 nations
- Winning time: 10.64 WR

Medalists
1st place, gold medalist(s)		Jaydin Blackwell	United States
2nd place, silver medalist(s)		Ryan Medrano	United States
3rd place, bronze medalist(s)		Juan Campas	Colombia

100 metres at the 2024 Summer Paralympics
Men · T11 · T12 · T13 · T34 · T35 · T36 · T37 · T38 · T44 · T47 · T51 · T52 · T53 · T54 · T63 · T64
Women · T11 · T12 · T13 · T34 · T35 · T36 · T37 · T38 · T47 · T53 · T54 · T63 · T64

The men's 100 metres T38 event at the 2024 Summer Paralympics in Paris, took place on 31 August 2024.

The T38 category is for ambulant athletes with cerebral palsy. T38 athletes have the mildest form of impairment caused by cerebral palsy, often in only one limb, and not affecting the ability to run, walk or jump freely, although impairing performance. T38 athletes may suffer minor co-ordination difficulties.

== Records ==
Prior to the competition, the existing records were as follows:

World Record	Jaydin Blackwell (USA)	10.72	(United States) Miramar	20 July 2024
Paralympic Record	Hu Jianwen (CHN)	10.74	(Brazil) Rio de Janeiro	13 September 2016

Area	Time		Athlete	Location	Date
Africa	11.11		(South Africa) Dyan Buis	(United Kingdom) London	1 September 2012
America	10.72	WR	(United States) Jaydin Blackwell	(United States) Miramar	20 July 2024
Asia	10.74		(China) Hu Jianwen	(Brazil) Rio de Janeiro	13 September 2016
Europe	10.94		(United Kingdom) Thomas Young	(Japan) Tokyo	28 August 2021
Oceania	10.79		(Australia) Evan O'Hanlon	(United Kingdom) London	1 September 2012

== Results ==
=== Final ===
Rank	Lane	Athlete	Nation	Time	Notes
1st place, gold medalist(s)	4	Jaydin Blackwell	United States	10.64	WR
2nd place, silver medalist(s)	6	Ryan Medrano	United States	10.97	PB
3rd place, bronze medalist(s)	9	Juan Campas	Colombia	10.99	PB
4	5	Thomas Young	Great Britain	11.00	
5	7	Dimitri Jozwicki	France	11.13	
6	2	Santiago Solís	Colombia	11.17	PB
7	8	Nick Mayhugh	United States	11.37	
8	1	Ali Al-Rikabi	Iraq	11.48	=PB
9	3	Zhou Peng	China	11.94	
Source:				Wind: +0.9 m/s	
