= Athletics at the 2024 Summer Paralympics – Women's discus throw F55 =

Women's Discus Throw F55 at the XVII Paralympic Games
- Venue: Stade de France, Paris
- Date: 30 August 2024
- Competitors: 13 from 10 nations

Medalists
1st place, gold medalist(s)		Érica Castaño	Colombia
2nd place, silver medalist(s)		Dong Feixia	China
3rd place, bronze medalist(s)		Rosa María Guerrero	Mexico

The Athletics at the 2024 Summer Paralympics – Women's discus throw F55 event at the 2024 Summer Paralympics in Paris, took place on 3 September 2024.

== Classification ==
The event is open to F54 and F55 athletes. These athletes are seated when throwing, they have normal arm muscle power. F54 athletes have no trunk movement, while F55 have full or nearly full trunk movement. F55 athletes may have flickers of hip flexor.

== Records ==
Prior to the competition, the existing records were as follows:

F54 Records

World Record	Nurkhon Kurbanova (UZB)	20.40m	(Japan) Tokyo	27 August 2021
Paralympic Record	Nurkhon Kurbanova (UZB)	20.40m	(Japan) Tokyo	27 August 2021

F55 Records

World Record	Marianne Buggenhagen (GER)	27.80m	(China) Beijing	9 September 2008
Paralympic Record	Marianne Buggenhagen (GER)	27.80m	(China) Beijing	9 September 2008

== Results ==
=== Final ===
The final in this classification took place on 30 August 2024:

Rank	Athlete	Nationality	Class	1	2	3	4	5	6	Best	Notes
1st place, gold medalist(s)	Érica Castaño	Colombia	F55	24.45	26.70	25.59	24.96	26.04	25.06	26.70	
2nd place, silver medalist(s)	Dong Feixia	China	F55	24.09	24.39	26.39	26.08	26.10	26.67	26.67	AR
3rd place, bronze medalist(s)	Rosa María Guerrero	Mexico	F55	24.99	25.22	25.81	25.05	19.43	24.93	25.81	SB
4	Diāna Krumina	Latvia	F55	23.74	23.87	24.31	20.63	22.83	x	24.31	
5	Norelhouda El Kaoui	Morocco	F55	23.42	22.71	22.39	x	22.91	21.98	23.42	AR
6	Rooba Alomari	Bahrain	F55	21.99	22.05	22.41	22.95	22.77	23.24	23.24	
7	Maria Guadalupe Navarro Hernandez	Mexico	F55	x	21.51	x	21.35	21.66	20.52	21.66	
8	Sakshi Kasana	India	F55	19.55	x	x	19.15	21.49	19.76	21.49	SB
9	Jyoti Karam Karamjyoti	India	F55	x	17.78	17.87	17.67	20.04	20.22	20.22	SB
10	Korotoumou Coulibaly	Mali	F55	14.78	16.91	17.40	18.57	18.41	12.48	18.57	
11	Nurkhon Kurbanova	Uzbekistan	F54	15.33	17.01	16.69	16.46	16.71	17.26	17.26	SB
12	Natalya Semyanova	Uzbekistan	F55	x	11.70	13.48	11.96	x	11.86	13.48	
DNS	Iveth del Rosario Valdes Romero	Panama	F55							DNS	
