= Swimming at the 2012 Summer Paralympics – Men's 100 metre breaststroke SB4 =

Event at the 2012 Summer Paralympics

Men's 100m Breaststroke SB4 at the XIV Paralympic Games
- Venue: London Aquatics Centre
- Dates: 4 September 2012
- Competitors: 10 from 7 nations
- Winning time: 1:32.27

Medalists
1st place, gold medalist(s)		Daniel Dias	Brazil
2nd place, silver medalist(s)		Moisés Fuentes	Colombia
3rd place, bronze medalist(s)		Ricardo Ten	Spain

The men's 100m breaststroke SB4 event at the 2012 Summer Paralympics took place at the London Aquatics Centre on 4 September. There were two heats; the swimmers with the eight fastest times advanced to the final.

== Results ==
=== Heats ===
Competed from 10:54.

==== Heat 1 ====
Rank	Lane	Name	Nationality	Time	Notes
1	4	Ricardo Ten	Spain	1:37.40	Q
2	5	Moisés Fuentes	Colombia	1:38.09	Q
3	3	Efrem Morelli	Italy	1:47.30	Q
4	2	Ariel Quassi	Argentina	1:59.44	
5	6	Francisco Avelino	Brazil	2:00.11	

==== Heat 2 ====
Rank	Lane	Name	Nationality	Time	Notes
1	4	Daniel Dias	Brazil	1:35.82	Q, WR
2	3	Pablo Cimadevila	Spain	1:43.94	Q
3	5	Antonios Tsapatakis	Greece	1:44.29	Q
4	2	Thanh Trung Nguyen	Vietnam	1:52.14	Q
5	6	Ivanildo Vasconcelos	Brazil	1:53.61	Q

=== Final ===
Competed at 19:03.

Rank	Lane	Name	Nationality	Time	Notes
1st place, gold medalist(s)	4	Daniel Dias	Brazil	1:32.27	WR
2nd place, silver medalist(s)	3	Moisés Fuentes	Colombia	1:36.92	
3rd place, bronze medalist(s)	5	Ricardo Ten	Spain	1:37.23	
4	2	Antonios Tsapatakis	Greece	1:41.37	
5	6	Pablo Cimadevila	Spain	1:45.46	
6	7	Efrem Morelli	Italy	1:47.79	
7	8	Ivanildo Vasconcelos	Brazil	1:52.84	
8	1	Thanh Trung Nguyen	Vietnam	1:53.60	

Q = qualified for final. WR = World Record.
