= Boccia at the 2024 Summer Paralympics – Men's individual BC4 =

Boccia – Men's individual BC4 at the XVII Paralympic Games
- Venue: South Paris Arena
- Date: 29 August - 2 September 2024
- Competitors: 16 from 15 nations

Medalists
| 1st place, gold medalist(s) | | Stephen McGuire | Great Britain |
| 2nd place, silver medalist(s) | | Edilson Chica | Colombia |
| 3rd place, bronze medalist(s) | | Artem Kolinko | Ukraine |

The men's individual BC4 boccia event at the 2024 Summer Paralympics will be contested between 29 August and 2 September 2024 at the South Paris Arena.

The event structure begins with pool stages. The top two players from each of four pools then enter into the single-elimination stage, with the losing semifinalists playing off for bronze.

== Classification ==
The BC4 classification is described as follows:

BC4M/F – Players in this class have severe locomotor dysfunction of all four extremities as well as poor trunk control. They can demonstrate sufficient dexterity to throw the ball onto the court. Players are not eligible for assistance.

== Results ==
=== Pool stages ===
The pool stage will be played between 29 and 31 August 2024. The top two players in each pool will qualify to the elimination rounds.

Pool A

| Pos | Player | Pld | W | D | L | PF | PA | PD | Pts | Qualification | (Colombia) | (Thailand) | (Germany) | (Egypt) |
|---|---|---|---|---|---|---|---|---|---|---|---|---|---|---|
| 1 | Euclides Grisales (COL) Q | 3 | 3 | 0 | 0 | 25 | 6 | +19 | 6 | Qualification for quarterfinal or playoff round | — | 5–1 | 11–0 | 9–5 |
| 2 | Pornchok Larpyen (THA) Q | 3 | 2 | 0 | 1 | 17 | 9 | +8 | 4 | Qualification for quarterfinal or playoff round | 1–5 | — | 5–4 | 11–0 |
| 3 | Boris Nicolai (GER) | 3 | 1 | 0 | 2 | 10 | 18 | −8 | 2 | Eliminated | 0–11 | 4–5 | — | 6–2 |
| 4 | Mahmoud Allam (EGY) | 3 | 0 | 0 | 3 | 7 | 26 | −19 | 0 | Eliminated | 5–9 | 0–11 | 2–6 | — |

Updated to match(es) played on 29 August 2024. Source: Paris 2024

Pool B

| Pos | Player | Pld | W | D | L | PF | PA | PD | Pts | Qualification | (Croatia) | (Colombia) | (Slovakia) | (Spain) |
|---|---|---|---|---|---|---|---|---|---|---|---|---|---|---|
| 1 | Davor Komar (CRO) Q | 3 | 3 | 0 | 0 | 31 | 4 | +27 | 6 | Qualification for quarterfinal or playoff round | — | 3*-3 | 10–1 | 18–0 |
| 2 | Edilson Chica (COL) Q | 3 | 2 | 0 | 1 | 11 | 6 | +5 | 4 | Qualification for quarterfinal or playoff round | 3–3* | — | 4–1 | 4–2 |
| 3 | Martin Strehársky (SVK) | 3 | 1 | 0 | 2 | 3 | 16 | −13 | 2 | Eliminated | 1–10 | 1–3 | — | 4–3 |
| 4 | Vasile Agache (ESP) | 3 | 0 | 0 | 3 | 5 | 26 | −21 | 0 | Eliminated | 0–18 | 2–4 | 3–4 | — |

Updated to match(es) played on 29 August 2024. Source: Paris 2024

Pool C

| Pos | Player | Pld | W | D | L | PF | PA | PD | Pts | Qualification | (United Kingdom) | (Ukraine) | (Canada) | (Malaysia) |
|---|---|---|---|---|---|---|---|---|---|---|---|---|---|---|
| 1 | Stephen McGuire (GBR) | 3 | 2 | 0 | 1 | 17 | 5 | +12 | 4 | Qualification for quarterfinal or playoff round | — | 7–1 | 2–4 | 8–0 |
| 2 | Artem Kolinko (UKR) | 3 | 2 | 0 | 1 | 11 | 9 | +2 | 4 | Qualification for quarterfinal or playoff round | 1–7 | — | 6–1 | 4–1 |
| 3 | Iulian Ciobonu (CAN) | 3 | 2 | 0 | 1 | 11 | 12 | −1 | 4 | Eliminated | 4–2 | 1–6 | — | 6–4 |
| 4 | Abdul Rahman (MAS) | 3 | 0 | 0 | 3 | 5 | 18 | −13 | 0 | Eliminated | 0–8 | 1–4 | 4–6 | — |

Updated to match(es) played on 29 August 2024. Source: Paris 2024

Pool D

| Pos | Player | Pld | W | D | L | PF | PA | PD | Pts | Qualification | (China) | (Hong Kong) | (Japan) | (Brazil) |
|---|---|---|---|---|---|---|---|---|---|---|---|---|---|---|
| 1 | Zheng Yuansen (CHN) Q | 3 | 3 | 0 | 0 | 20 | 3 | +17 | 6 | Qualification for quarterfinal or playoff round | — | 3–2 | 10–1 | 7–0 |
| 2 | Leung Yuk Wing (HKG) Q | 3 | 2 | 0 | 1 | 18 | 6 | +12 | 4 | Qualification for quarterfinal or playoff round | 2–3 | — | 8–2 | 8–1 |
| 3 | Shunsuke Uchida (JPN) | 3 | 1 | 0 | 2 | 11 | 20 | −9 | 2 | Eliminated | 1–10 | 2–8 | — | 8–2 |
| 4 | André Costa (BRA) | 3 | 0 | 0 | 3 | 3 | 23 | −20 | 0 | Eliminated | 0–7 | 1–8 | 2–8 | — |

Updated to match(es) played on 29 August 2024. Source: Paris 2024

=== Elimination stage ===
The final stage (or knockout stage) will be played between 1 and 2 September.

Quarter-finals
1 September, South Paris Arena
Euclides Grisales (COL) | 1
Edilson Chica (COL) | 4
1 September, South Paris Arena
Zheng Yuansen (CHN) | 2
Artem Kolinko (UKR) | 3
1 September, South Paris Arena
Davor Komar (CRO) | 7
P Larpyen (THA) | 2
1 September, South Paris Arena
S McGuire (GBR) | 6
Leung Yuk Wing (HKG) | 1

Semi-finals
1 September, South Paris Arena
Edilson Chica (COL) | 3
Artem Kolinko (UKR) | 1
1 September, South Paris Arena
Davor Komar (CRO) | 3
S McGuire (GBR) | 5

Final
2 September, South Paris Arena
Edilson Chica (COL) | 5
S McGuire (GBR) | 8
Bronze medal
1 September, South Paris Arena
Artem Kolinko (UKR) | 4
Davor Komar (CRO) | 3

Elimination Matches

Quarterfinals

Match QF1:
| Player/End | 1 | 2 | 3 | 4 | Result | Report |
| Edilson Chica (COL) | 1 | 0 | 2 | 1 | 4 | Report |
| Euclides Grisales (COL) | 0 | 1 | 0 | 0 | 1 | Report |
Match QF2:
| Player/End | 1 | 2 | 3 | 4 | Result | Report |
| Davor Komar (CRO) | 2 | 0 | 5 | 0 | 7 | Report |
| P Larpyen (THA) | 0 | 1 | 0 | 1 | 2 | Report |
Match QF3:
| Player/End | 1 | 2 | 3 | 4 | Result | Report |
| Leung Yuk Wing (HKG) | 0 | 0 | 1 | 0 | 1 | Report |
| S McGuire (GBR) | 3 | 2 | 0 | 1 | 6 | Report |
Match QF4:
| Player/End | 1 | 2 | 3 | 4 | Result | Report |
| Zheng Yuansen (CHN) | 1 | 0 | 0 | 1 | 2 | Report |
| Artem Kolinko (UKR) | 0 | 1 | 2 | 0 | 3 | Report |

Semifinals

Match SF1:
| Player/End | 1 | 2 | 3 | 4 | Result | Report |
| Edilson Chica (COL) | 0 | 1 | 1 | 1 | 3 | Report |
| Artem Kolinko (UKR) | 1 | 0 | 0 | 0 | 1 | Report |
Match SF2:
| Player/End | 1 | 2 | 3 | 4 | Result | Report |
| S McGuire (GBR) | 1 | 3 | 1 | 0 | 5 | Report |
| Davor Komar (CRO) | 0 | 0 | 0 | 3 | 3 | Report |

Finals

Bronze medal match:
| Player/End | 1 | 2 | 3 | 4 | Result | Report |
| Davor Komar (CRO) | 0 | 2 | 0 | 1 | 3 | Report |
| Artem Kolinko (UKR) | 3 | 0 | 1 | 0 | 4 | Report |
Gold medal match:
| Player/End | 1 | 2 | 3 | 4 | Result | Report |
| Edilson Chica (COL) | 0 | 3 | 0 | 2 | 5 | Report |
| S McGuire (GBR) | 3 | 0 | 5 | 0 | 8 | Report |
