= Artem Kolinko =

Ukrainian boccia player (born 1984)

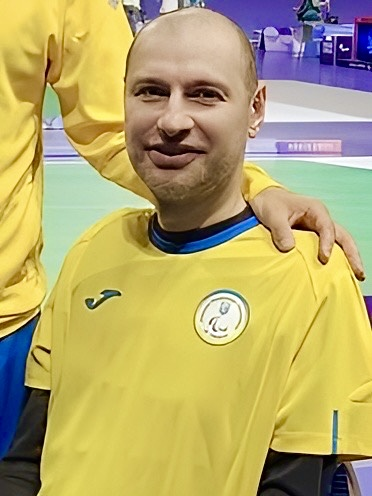

Personal information
- Born: 23 April 1984 (age 42)

Sport
- Country: Ukraine
- Sport: Boccia
Medal record
Men's boccia
Representing Ukraine
Paralympic Games
Bronze medal – third place	2024 Paris	Individual BC4
European Para Championships
Gold medal – first place	2023 Rotterdam	Mixed pairs BC4

Artem Oleksandrovych Kolinko (born 23 April 1984) is a Ukrainian boccia player. He competed at the 2024 Summer Paralympics, winning a bronze medal in the men's individual BC4 event.
