= Swimming at the 2020 Summer Paralympics – Men's 100 metre breaststroke SB4 =

Men's 100 metre breaststroke SB4 at the XVI Paralympic Games
- Venue: Tokyo Aquatics Centre
- Dates: 29 August 2021
- Competitors: 14 from 11 nations

Medalists
1st place, gold medalist(s)		Dmitrii Cherniaev	RPC
2nd place, silver medalist(s)		Moisés Fuentes	Colombia
3rd place, bronze medalist(s)		Antonios Tsapatakis	Greece

The men's 100 metre breaststroke SB4 event at the 2020 Paralympic Games took place on 29 August 2021, at the Tokyo Aquatics Centre.

== Heats ==
The swimmers with the top eight times, regardless of heat, advanced to the final.

Rank	Heat	Lane	Name	Nationality	Time	Notes
1	1	4	Dmitrii Cherniaev	RPC	1:33.42	Q, ER
2	2	4	Moisés Fuentes	Colombia	1:39.65	Q
3	2	5	Antonios Tsapatakis	Greece	1:42.36	Q
4	1	5	Aleksandr Molkov	RPC	1:44.37	Q
5	2	3	Nicolás Rivero	Argentina	1:46.69	Q
6	2	6	Miguel Ángel Rincón	Colombia	1:47.35	Q
7	2	1	Ruan Jingsong	China	1:49.11	Q
8	1	3	Francesco Bocciardo	Italy	1:51.11	Q
9	1	6	Luis Huerta Poza	Spain	1:54.72	
10	1	7	Voravit Kaewkham	Thailand	1:57.55	
11	1	1	Zeyad Kahil	Egypt	1:59.02	
12	2	7	Konstantinos Karaouzas	Greece	2:04.19	
13	2	2	Bashar Halabi	Israel	2:37.37	
	1	2	Muhammad Nur Syaiful Zulkafli	Malaysia	DSQ	

== Final ==
100m breaststroke final
Rank	Lane	Name	Nationality	Time	Notes
1st place, gold medalist(s)	4	Dmitrii Cherniaev	RPC	1:31.96	WR
2nd place, silver medalist(s)	5	Moisés Fuentes	Colombia	1:35.86	
3rd place, bronze medalist(s)	3	Antonios Tsapatakis	Greece	1:40.20	
4	6	Aleksandr Molkov	RPC	1:41.27	
5	1	Ruan Jingsong	China	1:44.13	
6	2	Nicolás Rivero	Argentina	1:46.52	
7	7	Miguel Ángel Rincón	Colombia	1:46.74	
8	8	Francesco Bocciardo	Italy	1:51.06	
