= Juan Campas =

Colombian paralympic athlete

Personal information
- Full name: Juan Alejandro Campas Sánchez
- Born: 4 March 1993 (age 33)
- Spouse: María Sanmartín

Sport
- Country: Colombia
- Sport: Para-athletics
Medal record
Men's para-athletics
Representing Colombia
Paralympic Games
Bronze medal – third place	2024 Paris	100 m T38
Bronze medal – third place	2024 Paris	400 m T38

Juan Alejandro Campas Sánchez (Note: In this Spanish name, the first or paternal surname is Campas and the second or maternal family name is Sánchez.) (born 4 March 1993), also known as Juan Campas and Juan Alejandro Campáz, is a Colombian Paralympic athlete. He competed at the 2024 Summer Paralympics, winning the bronze medal in the men's 100 metres T38 event.
