= Edilson Chica =

Colombian boccia player (born 1977)

Personal information
- Born: December 25, 1977 (age 48)

Sport
- Country: Colombia
- Sport: Boccia
- Disability class: BC4
Medal record
Men's boccia
Representing Colombia
Paralympic Games
Gold medal – first place	2024 Paris	Pairs BC4
Silver medal – second place	2024 Paris	Individual BC4
Parapan American Games
Gold medal – first place	2023 Santiago	Individual BC4
Silver medal – second place	2023 Santiago	Pairs BC4
South American Para Games
Gold medal – first place	2026 Valledupar	Individual BC4
Gold medal – first place	2026 Valledupar	Pairs BC4

Edilson Chica (born 25 December 1977) is a Colombian boccia player. He competed at the 2024 Summer Paralympics, reaching the finals of the men's individual BC4 event.

Chica is the brother of Leidy Chica, who also won a medal in boccia at the 2024 Paralympics.
