= Bartolomeu Chaves =

Brazilian Paralympic athlete (born 2001)

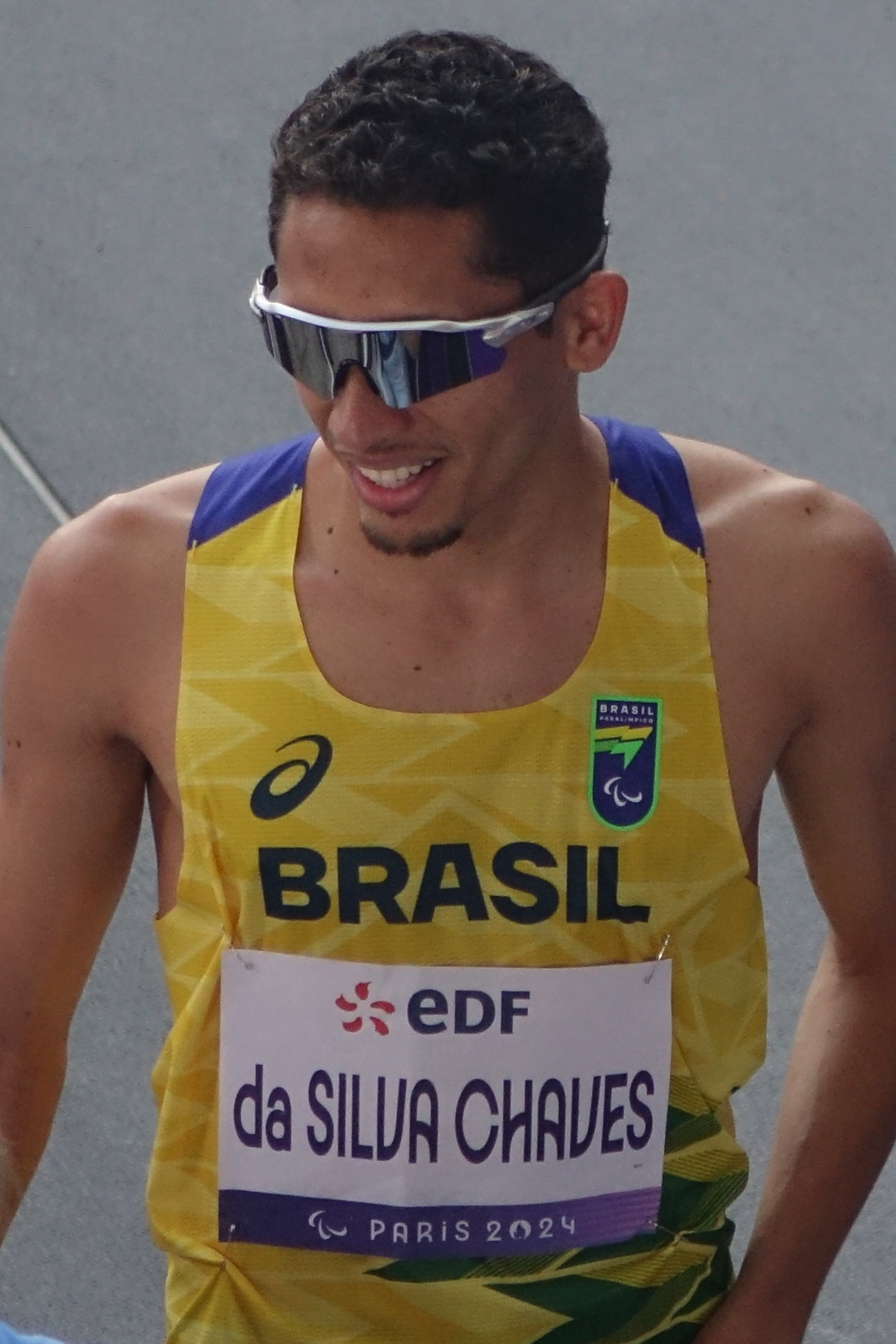
- Chaves at the 2024 Summer Paralympics

Personal information
- Full name: Bartolomeu da Silva Chaves
- Nationality: Brazilian
- Born: 20 March 2001 (age 25)

Sport
- Sport: Para-athletics
- Disability class: T37
- Event: 400 metres
Medal record
Men's para-athletics
Representing Brazil
Paralympic Games
Silver medal – second place	2024 Paris	400 m T37
World Championships
Gold medal – first place	2024 Kobe	400 m T37
Gold medal – first place	2025 New Delhi	400 m T37
Silver medal – second place	2025 New Delhi	200 m T37
Bronze medal – third place	2023 Paris	400 m T37

Bartolomeu da Silva Chaves (born 20 March 2001) is a Brazilian T37 Paralympic sprint runner.

== Career ==
In May 2024, he competed at the 2024 World Para Athletics Championships and won a gold medal in the 400 metres T37 event. He then represented Brazil at the 2024 Summer Paralympics and won a silver medal in the 400 metres T37 event.
