= Martha Liliana Hernández Florián =

Colombian Paralympic athlete

Personal information
- Born: 20 May 1988 (age 38) Guamal, Colombia
- Height: 1.71 m (5 ft 7 in)

Sport
- Country: Colombia
- Sport: Para-athletics
- Disability: Cerebral palsy
- Disability class: T36
- Coached by: Pablo Peña
Medal record
Women's para-athletics
Representing Colombia
Paralympic Games
Bronze medal – third place	2016 Rio de Janeiro	100 m T36
Parapan American Games
Gold medal – first place	2019 Lima	Shot put F35/36/37
Silver medal – second place	2015 Toronto	Shot put F35/36
Bronze medal – third place	2015 Toronto	100 m T36
Bronze medal – third place	2015 Toronto	200 m T36
Bronze medal – third place	2019 Lima	100 m T36
Bronze medal – third place	2019 Lima	Universal relay

Martha Liliana Hernández Florián (born 20 May 1988) is a Colombian Paralympic athlete who competes in sprint and shot put events at international elite competitions. She is a Paralympic bronze medalist and a Parapan American Games champion in 100 metres and shot put respectively.
