= Jaydin Blackwell =

American Paralympic sprinter (born 2004)

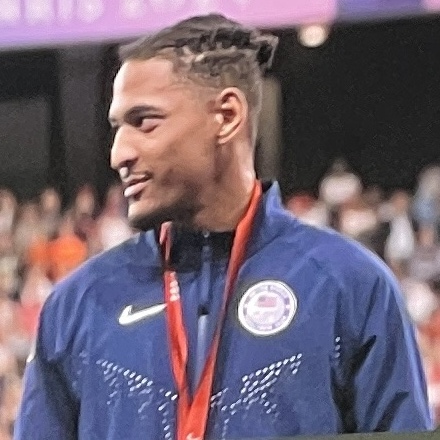
- Blackwell at the 2024 Paralympic Games

Personal information
- Born: March 16, 2004 (age 22) Oak Park, Michigan, U.S.

Sport
- Sport: Para athletics
- Disability: Cerebral palsy
- Disability class: T38
- Event: Sprints
Medal record
Men's para athletics
Representing the United States
Paralympic Games
Gold medal – first place	2024 Paris	100 m T38
Gold medal – first place	2024 Paris	400 m T38
World Championships
Gold medal – first place	2023 Paris	100 m T38
Gold medal – first place	2023 Paris	400 m T38
Gold medal – first place	2024 Kobe	100 m T38
Gold medal – first place	2024 Kobe	400 m T38
Gold medal – first place	2025 New Delhi	100 m T38
Gold medal – first place	2025 New Delhi	400 m T38

Jaydin Blackwell (born March 16, 2004) is an American T38 Paralympic sprint runner. He is a two-time Paralympic gold medalist, and six-time World Champion.

== Career ==
On May 25, 2023, Blackwell was selected to represent the United States at the 2023 World Para Athletics Championships, where he made his international debut. He won a gold medal in the 100 metres T38 event with a championship record time of 10.92 seconds. He also won a gold medal in the 400 metres T38 event with a world record time of 48.49 seconds.

In May 2024, he competed at the 2024 World Para Athletics Championships and won a gold medal in the 100 meters T38 event with a World Para Athletics Championships record time of 10.86 seconds. He also won a gold medal in the 400 metres T38 event with a time of 48.87 seconds. He then represented the United States at the 2024 Summer Paralympics and won gold medals in both the 100 metres T38 and the 400 metres T38 events.

He competed at the 2025 World Para Athletics Championships and won a gold medal in the 100 meters T38 event with championship record time of 10.70 seconds. He also won a gold medal in the 400 metres T38 event with a world record time of 48.00 seconds.

== Personal life ==
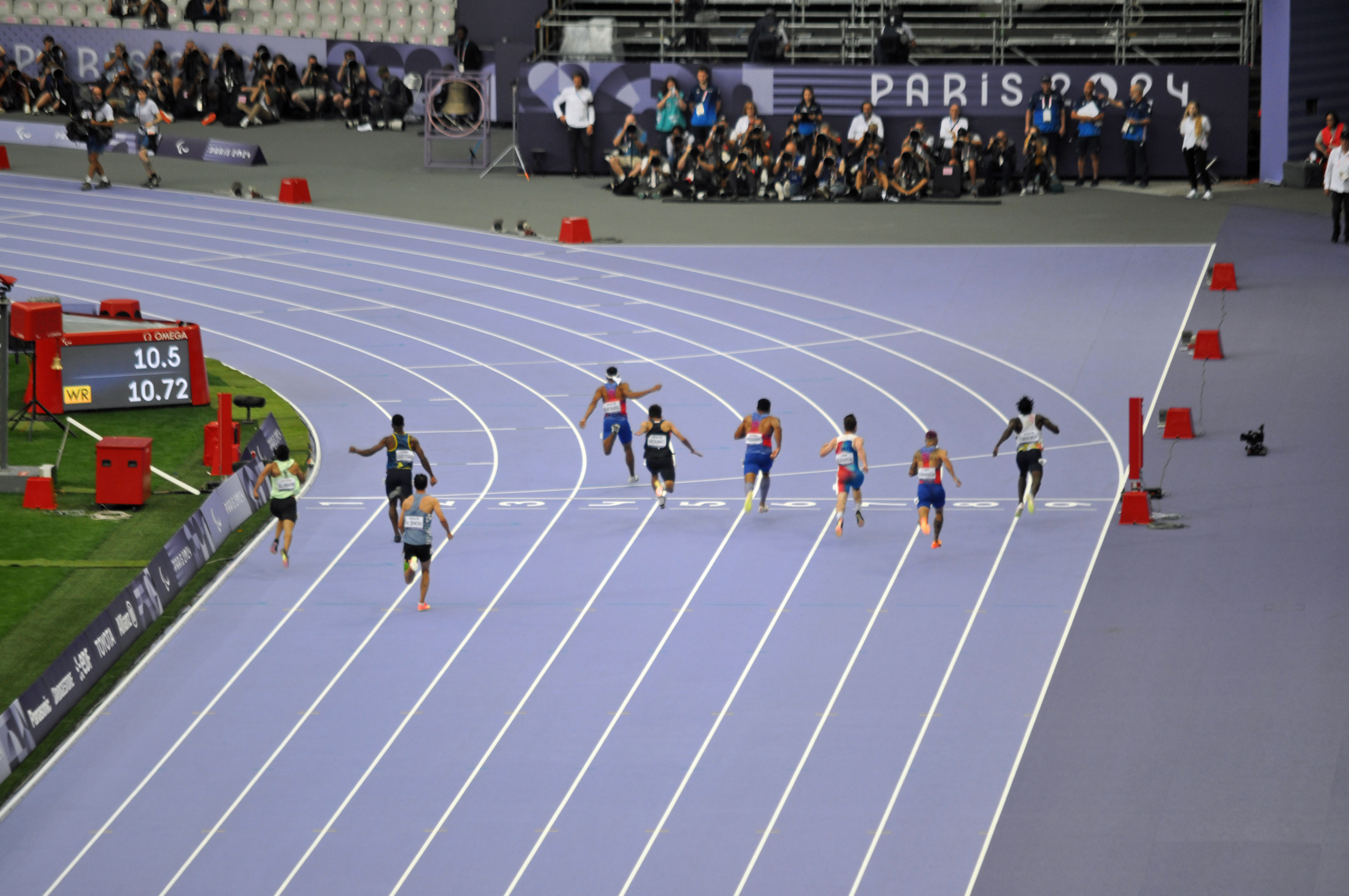
Blackwell winning the 100 metres T38 final during the 2024 Summer Paralympics.

Blackwell was born premature at 26 weeks and weighed 1 pound, 9 ounces, and has cerebral palsy.
