= Elkin Serna =

Colombian Paralympic athlete

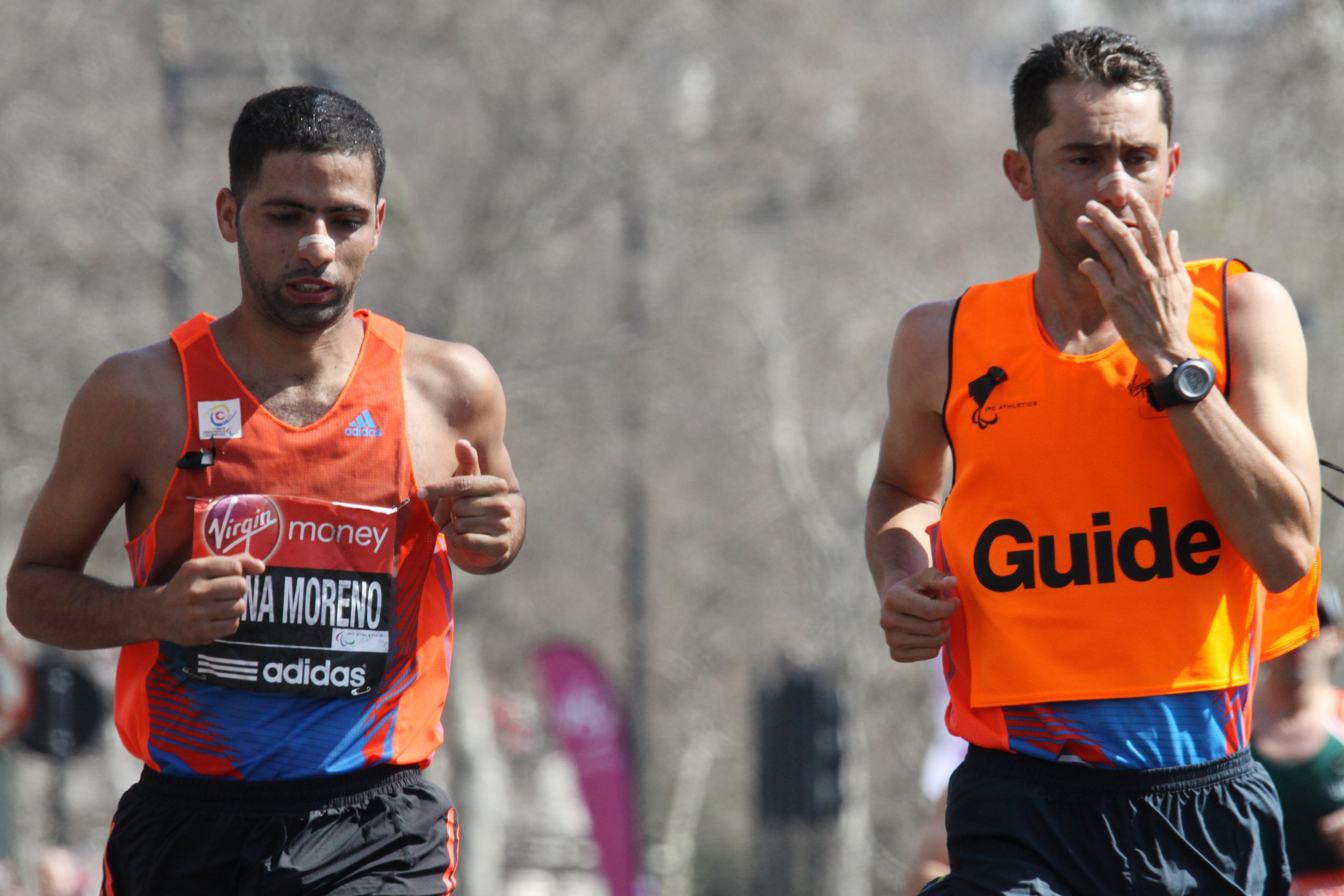
- Elkin Serna (left) during 2013 London Marathon

Personal information
- Born: 13 January 1985 (age 41)

Sport
- Sport: Paralympic athletics
- Disability class: T12
Medal record
Track and field
Representing Colombia
Paralympic Games
Silver medal – second place	2008 Beijing	Marathon – T12
Silver medal – second place	2012 London	Marathon – T12
World Para Athletics Championships
Silver medal – second place	2011 Christchurch	Marathon – T12
Silver medal – second place	2013 Lyon	Marathon – T12
Parapan American Games
Gold medal – first place	2011 Guadalajara	5000m – T12
Silver medal – second place	2007 Rio de Janeiro	1500m – T12
Silver medal – second place	2011 Guadalajara	1500m – T13
Bronze medal – third place	2015 Toronto	5000m – T12

Elkin Alonso Serna Moreno (born January 13, 1985) is a Paralympic athlete from Colombia competing mainly in category T12 long-distance events.

He competed in the 2008 Summer Paralympics in Beijing, China. There he won a silver medal in the men's Marathon – T12 event, did not finish in the men's 5000 metres – T13 event and finished fourth in the men's 10,000 metres – T12 event. He won again a silver medal in the 2012 London Paralympics, in the Marathon T12.
