= Yesenia Restrepo =

Colombian Paralympic athlete (born 1982)

Personal information
- Full name: Yesenia María Restrepo Muñoz
- Born: 3 June 1982 (age 44) Medellín, Colombia

Sport
- Country: Colombia
- Sport: Para-athletics
Medal record
Women's para-athletics
Representing Colombia
Paralympic Games
Bronze medal – third place	2016 Rio de Janeiro	4×100 m relay T11-T13
Bronze medal – third place	2020 Tokyo	Discus throw F11
Parapan American Games
Silver medal – second place	2019 Lima	Discus throw F11

Yesenia María Restrepo Muñoz (born 3 June 1982) is a Colombian Paralympic athlete. She won the bronze medal in the women's 4 × 100 metres relay T11-T13 event at the 2016 Summer Paralympics held in Rio de Janeiro, Brazil.

She also won the bronze medal in the women's discus throw F11 event at the 2020 Summer Paralympics held in Tokyo, Japan.
