= José Rodolfo Chessani =

Mexican Paralympic athlete (born 1998)

Rodolfo Chessani
Personal information
- Full name: José Rodolfo Chessani García
- Born: 23 November 1998 (age 27) Coatzacoalcos, Veracruz, Mexico

Sport
- Sport: Paralympic athletics
- Disability class: T38
- Events: 100m, 400m
Medal record
Men's athletics
Representing Mexico
Paralympic Games
| Gold medal – first place | 2020 Tokyo | 400m T38 |
World Championships
| Bronze medal – third place | 2024 Kobe | 400 m T38 |
Parapan American Games
| Silver medal – second place | 2023 Santiago | 400 m T38 |
| Bronze medal – third place | 2023 Santiago | 100m T38 |

José Rodolfo Chessani García (Note: In this Spanish name, the first or paternal surname is Chessani and the second or maternal family name is García.) (born 23 November 1998), known as Rodolfo Chessani, is a Mexican Paralympic athlete. He made his first Paralympic appearance representing Mexico at the 2020 Summer Paralympics, where he clinched the gold medal in the men's T38 400m event.
