= Moisés Fuentes (swimmer) =

Colombian Paralympic swimmer

Personal information
- Full name: Moisés Fuentes García
- Born: 22 September 1974 (age 51) San Gil, Colombia
- Height: 169 cm (5 ft 7 in)

Sport
- Country: Colombia
- Sport: Para swimming
- Disability: Spinal cord injury
- Disability class: S4
Medal record
Representing Colombia
Men's para swimming
Event	1st	2nd	3rd
Paralympic Games	0	2	2
World Championships	1	4	1
Parapan American Games	3	6	2
South American Para Games	1	0	0
Total	5	12	5
Paralympic Games
Silver medal – second place	2012 London	100 m breaststroke SB4
Silver medal – second place	2020 Tokyo	100 m breaststroke SB4
Bronze medal – third place	2008 Beijing	100 m breaststroke SB4
Bronze medal – third place	2016 Rio de Janeiro	100 m breaststroke SB4
World Championships
Gold medal – first place	2013 Montreal	100 m breaststroke SB4
Silver medal – second place	2017 Mexico City	100 m breaststroke SB4
Silver medal – second place	2019 London	100 m breaststroke SB4
Silver medal – second place	2022 Madeira	100 m breaststroke SB4
Silver medal – second place	2025 Singapore	100 m breaststroke SB4
Bronze medal – third place	2006 Durban	100 m breaststroke SB4
Parapan American Games
Gold medal – first place	2003 Mar del Plata	100 m freestyle S5
Gold medal – first place	2015 Toronto	100 m breaststroke SB4
Gold medal – first place	2019 Lima	100 m breaststroke SB4
Silver medal – second place	2003 Mar del Plata	50 m freestyle S5
Silver medal – second place	2007 Rio de Janeiro	50 m freestyle S5
Silver medal – second place	2007 Rio de Janeiro	100 m freestyle S5
Silver medal – second place	2007 Rio de Janeiro	100 m breaststroke SB4
Silver medal – second place	2007 Rio de Janeiro	200 m freestyle S5
Silver medal – second place	2011 Guadalajara	100 m breaststroke SB4
Bronze medal – third place	2003 Mar del Plata	100 m breaststroke SB4
Bronze medal – third place	2003 Mar del Plata	200 m medley SM5
South American Para Games
Gold medal – first place	2026 Valledupar	100 m breaststroke SB4

Moisés Fuentes García (born 22 September 1974) is a Colombian Paralympic swimmer who competes in international level events. He is a triple Paralympic medalist, a World champion and a triple Parapan American Games champion.

== Personal life ==
In October 1992, Fuentes and his older brother Rodrigo were attacked by gunmen in Santa Marta outside of his brother's coffee stall. Moisés was shot in the vertebrae resulting in paraplegia from the waist down and his right leg was amputated below the knee, his brother was killed in the attack.
