= Colombian Paralympic Committee =

National Paralympic Committee of Colombia

Colombian Paralympic Committee Comité Paralímpico Colombiano

National Paralympic Committee
- Country: Colombia
- Code: COL
- Created: 2001
- Continental association: APC
- Headquarters: Bogotá, Colombia
- President: Julio César Ávila Sarria
- Secretary General: Verónica Velásquez Rodríguez
- Website: Official website

The Colombian Paralympic Committee Spanish: Comité Paralímpico Colombiano is a private, non-profit organization representing the Colombian Paralympic athletes in the International Paralympic Committee (IPC), the Parapan American Games, and the South American Para Games. It is the governing body of the Colombian Paralympic sport; it represents 15 member sports organizations.

== Mission ==
The Colombian Paralympic Committee is the entity that promotes the formulation and implementation of the public policy of sport recreation, and sports rehabilitation within the Colombian Paralympic System. In addition, it coordinates and executes the different programs of the Paralympic and Deaflympic sports in the Colombian territory in conjunction with its national federations and competent international entities.

This organizational structure defines a dimension in the aspect of the projections in its organizational processes, established in its programmatic vision.

== Objectives ==
=== General Objective ===
Achieve the strengthening and consolidation of the Colombian Paralympic Committee, making visible the disability situation in the national and international sports, recreation, and leisure time of people with disabilities.

=== Specific Objectives ===
- Position the Colombian Paralympic Committee as the governing body for the sport of people with disabilities in all national and international instances.
- Consolidate the internal management structures of the Colombian Paralympic Committee with an effective approach.
- Build the policies and guidelines to ensure the proper functioning of the National Paralympic System in harmony with the International System.
- To create conditions for the development of Paralympic and Deaflympic sports practices in Colombia.
- Strengthen the structures of the Paralympic System through processes of cultural transformation, sports development from the base, and sports projection, in line with the new world trends in sport.
- Build and apply a comprehensive policy of communication, education and dissemination of the Colombian Paralympic culture.
- Promote in the Colombian social imaginary, the gradual actions of transformation of practices oriented to the use of free time, recreation, and sport by people with disabilities, in all their manifestations, to guarantee real and effective access to these activities.
- Establish the necessary strategic alliances with public and private organizations and civil society organizations, within the different social, political, economic, and cultural sectors to contribute to the objectives of the Plan.
- Promote transversal actions that facilitate the production and development of new knowledge about the Colombian Paralympic System.

== Associated Federations ==
- FEDELIV: Federación de deportes de limitados visuales (Federation of limited visual sports).
  - President: Jose Domingo Bernal
- FEDESIR: Federacion Colombiana de Deportes para personas con Discapacidad Física (Colombian Sports Federation for People with Physical Disabilities).
  (Athletics, Wheelchair Basketball, Cycling, Wheelchair Tennis, Table tennis in wheelchairs, Powerlifting, Wheelchair Rugby, Swimming, Shooting, Handcycling, Parachute, Sitting Volleyball, Chess).
  - President: Carlos Manuel García Cantillo
- FECDE–PC: Federacion Colombiana de Deportistas con Parálisis Cerebral (Colombian Federation of Athletes with Cerebral Palsy).
  - President: Noé Sepúlveda
- FEDES: Federación Colombiana de Deporte Especial (Colombian Federation of Special Sports).
  - President: Bitalia Maestre Molina
- FECOLDES: Federación Colombiana Deportiva de Sordos (Colombian Sports Federation to Deaf).
  - President: Luz Mary Quintero

== International events ==
The CPC represents and coordinates the participation of Colombian athletes in the maximum number of Paralympic tournaments:

- Paralympic Games
- Parapan American Games
- South American Para Games

== See also ==
- Colombia at the Paralympics
- Colombian Olympic Committee
