= Tayana Medeiros =

Brazilian Paralympic powerlifter (born 1993)

Personal information
- Full name: Tayana de Souza Medeiros
- Born: 14 March 1993 (age 33) Rio de Janeiro, Rio de Janeiro, Brazil

Sport
- Country: Brazil
- Sport: powerlifting
- Event: 86kg
Medal record
Women's powerlifting
Representing Brazil
Summer Paralympics
Gold medal – first place	2024 Paris	86 kg
World Championships
Gold medal – first place	2025 Cairo	Team
Silver medal – second place	2025 Cairo	86 kg
Silver medal – second place	2023 Dubai	Team
Parapan American Games
Gold medal – first place	2023 Santiago	86 kg & +86 kg
Silver medal – second place	2019 Lima	79kg & 86kg
South American Para Games
Gold medal – first place	2026 Valledupar	86 kg & +86 kg
Gold medal – first place	2026 Valledupar	Team

Tayana de Souza Medeiros (born 14 March 1993) is a Brazilian Paralympic powerlifter.

== Background ==
Medeiros is from the city of Rio de Janeiro. She was born with arthrogryposis, which compromised the development of her lower limbs. Until she was five years old, she moved around using her hands. By the age of nine, she had already undergone twelve surgeries, including on her legs, hips, feet and knees. She discovered weightlifting after an event in the sport before the 2016 Summer Paralympics.

== Career ==
In May 2017, Medeiros participated in the Weightlifting World Cup in Eger, Hungary, and lifted 102 kg on her second attempt, winning the bronze medal in the over 86 kg category and surpassing he personal best of 74 kg. In December of the same year, at the World Para Powerlifting Championships in Mexico City, she finished eighth in the over 86 kg category, with 112 kg on the bar.

In May 2018, Medeiros competed in the European Open Powerlifting Championships in Berk Sur Mer, France, and won silver in the up to 86 kg category. In December, she won the gold medal at the Americas Regional Powertlifting Championships in Bogotá, Colombia, in the over 86 kg category. In February 2020, she competed in the Powerlifting World Cup in Abuja, Nigeria, but failed to complete all three of her attempts. At the 2020 Summer Paralympics, she lifted 121 kg and finished in fifth place. At the 2021 University Paralympics, Medeiros changed disciplines and competed in the F56 class shot put (for wheelchair users) and won silver with a mark of 5.33 meters.

In July 2022, at the Americas Open weightlifting event, held at the Logan University Campus in Chesterfield, United States, Medeiros won gold in the up to 86 kg category by lifting 126 kg. In December of the same year, at the Dubai stage in the United Arab Emirates, at the Para Powerlifting World Cup, she won silver and broke her own Americas record by lifting 129 kg. With the women's team, Medeiros won a gold medal alongside Lara Aparecida de Lima and Mariana D'Andrea.

In August 2023, Medeiros competed in the World Para Powerlifting Championships in Dubai, United Arab Emirates. She competed in the women's up to 86 kg category, but had three of her movements disallowed, one of 135 kg and two of 136 kg. The Brazilian technical committee also launched a technical challenge, a device that requires the referees who disallowed the movement to reevaluate the decision based on images, however the lift remained void.
