= 2026 Para-South American Games =

Multi sport event in South America

II Para-South American Games
- Host city: Valledupar and Agustín Codazzi
- Country: Colombia
- Nations: 11
- Athletes: 1064
- Events: 306 in 13 sports
- Opening: 5 July 2026
- Closing: 15 July 2026
- Opened by: Gustavo Petro

The 2026 South American Para Games, officially known as the 2nd Para-South American Games, is a multi-sport event scheduled to be held from 5 to 15 July 2026 in Valledupar and Agustín Codazzi, Colombia. It will be the first edition of the games in over 10 years and the second overall, as the 2018 version, which was expected to be held in Cochabamba, Bolivia, was cancelled due to financial reasons.

The games will be part of the qualification process for the 2027 Parapan American Games, either by contributing to the ranking of athletes or by giving direct qualification to those athletes who win gold medals in the boccia, football 5-a-side, and wheelchair basketball events.

== Participating nations ==
Eleven nations will compete in this edition of Para-South American Games. Bolivia, Panama, and Paraguay will make their games' debuts. Numbers in parentheses indicate the number of athletes competing.

- Argentina (159)
- Bolivia (29)
- Brazil (236)
- Chile (135)
- Colombia (168) (Host)
- Ecuador (40)
- Panama (37)
- Paraguay (4)
- Peru (111)
- Uruguay (13)
- Venezuela (119)

== Sports ==
Thirteen sports will be contested in this edition of Para-South American Games. Archery, football 5-a-side, goalball, para-badminton, para-cycling and sitting volleyball were added to the program.

- Archery (13)
- Athletics (86)
- Boccia (18)
- Football 5-a-side (1)
- Goalball (2)
- Para-badminton (12)
- Para-cycling (14)
- Powerlifting (23)
- Sitting volleyball (2)
- Swimming (94)
- Table tennis (17)
- Wheelchair basketball (2)
- Wheelchair tennis (6)

== Calendar ==
OC	Opening ceremony	●	Event competitions	1	Event finals	CC	Closing ceremony

July		2nd Thu	3rd Fri	4th Sat	5th Sun	6th Mon	7th Tue	8th Wed	9th Thu	10th Fri	11th Sat	12th Sun	13th Mon	14th Tue	15th Wed	Medal events
Ceremonies (opening / closing)					OC										CC	—N/a
Archery													3	4	6	12
Athletics												28	22	20	16	86
Boccia											●	●	13	●	5	18
Football 5-a-side									●	●	●	●	●	●	1	1
Goalball				●	●	●	●	2								2
Para-badminton											●	●	1	8	3	12
Cycling	Road	7	3	4												14
Powerlifting				10	8	5										23
Sitting volleyball				●	●	●	●	2								2
Swimming											27	10	24	18	15	94
Table tennis					●	5	12									17
Wheelchair basketball		●	●	●	●	1	1									2
Wheelchair tennis												●	●	3	3	6
Daily medal events		7	3	14	8	11	13	4	0	0	27	38	63	53	49	306
Cumulative total		7	10	24	32	43	56	60	60	60	87	114	153	214	268	306
		2nd Thu	3rd Fri	4th Sat	5th Sun	6th Mon	7th Tue	8th Wed	9th Thu	10th Fri	11th Sat	12th Sun	13th Mon	14th Tue	15th Wed	Medal events

== Medal table ==
* Host nation (Colombia)

Rank	Nation	Gold	Silver	Bronze	Total
1	Brazil (BRA)	110	82	52	244
2	Colombia (COL)*	75	58	65	198
3	Argentina (ARG)	41	51	40	132
4	Chile (CHI)	27	29	45	101
5	Venezuela (VEN)	25	39	25	89
6	Peru (PER)	12	17	12	41
7	Ecuador (ECU)	10	5	8	23
8	Panama (PAN)	1	1	5	7
9	Uruguay (URU)	0	1	1	2
10	Paraguay (PAR)	0	0	1	1
Totals (10 entries)		301	283	254	838

Source: Valledupar 2026

== Medalists ==
=== Archery ===
Event	Gold	Silver	Bronze
Men's compound open	Joffre Villavicencio; Ecuador	Cristian Correa; Colombia	Edixon Parada; Venezuela
Men's recurve open	Héctor Ramírez; Colombia	Jairo Burgos; Colombia	Thiago Silva; Brazil
Men's individual W1	Eugênio Franco; Brazil	Victor Bocaz; Chile	Helcio Perillo; Brazil
Men's team compound open	Venezuela; Edixon Parada; Nelson Rodríguez	Colombia; Cristián Correa; Junior Rentería	Brazil; Diogo Santos; Reinaldo Charão
Men's team recurve open	Colombia; Jairo Burgos; Héctor Ramírez	Brazil; Thiago Silva; Gabriel Veras	Ecuador; César Martínez; Álvaro Alava
Women's compound open	Jane Karla Gögel; Brazil	Helena Moraes; Brazil	Ariana Correa; Colombia
Women's recurve open	Daniela Campos; Peru	Maira Mosquera; Colombia	Amanda Garabito; Chile
Women's individual W1	Juliana Ferreira; Brazil	Mariela López; Chile	Angie Alarcón; Colombia
Women's team compound open	Brazil; Jane Karla Gögel; Helena Moraes	Colombia; Yasneide Peñaranda; Ariana Correa	Chile; Claudia Armijo; Carla Candia
Mixed individual VI	Gustavo Araújo; Brazil	Gabriela Romero; Ecuador	Yanina Dell Orto; Argentina
Mixed team W1	Brazil; Eugênio Franco; Juliana Ferreira	Colombia; Miguel Patarroyo; Angie Alarcón	Chile; Víctor Saiz; Mariana López
Mixed team compound open	Colombia; Cristián Correa; Ariana Correa	Brazil; Reinaldo Charão; Jane Karla Gögel	Ecuador; Joffre Villaviencio; Diana Gonzabay
Mixed team recurve open	Colombia; Héctor Ramírez; Maira Mosquera	Brazil; Thiago Silva; Fabiola Dergovics	Peru; Marco Huaytalla; Daniela Campos

=== Athletics ===
Event	Gold	Silver	Bronze
Men's 100 metres T11	Enderson Santos; Venezuela	Daniel Silva; Brazil	Cristián Giraldo; Colombia
Men's 100 metres T12	Christian Cerda; Chile	Joeferson Marinho; Brazil	Renato Oliveira; Brazil
Men's 100 metres T13	Samuel Souza; Brazil	Franco Pinetti; Argentina	Deivis Guerrero; Panama
Men's 100 metres T35	Henrique Nascimento; Brazil	Maximiliano Villa; Argentina	Not awarded
Men's 100 metres T36	Fabricio López; Argentina	Alexis Chávez; Argentina	Omar Acosta; Colombia
Men's 100 metres T37	Mateus Evangelista; Brazil	Yeferson Suárez; Colombia	Edson Pinheiro; Brazil
Men's 100 metres T38	Leandro Viana; Brazil	Juan Gómez Coa; Colombia	David Pérez; Chile
Men's 100 metres T44	Romildo Santos; Brazil	Rafael Uribe; Venezuela	Not awarded
Men's 100 metres T47	Lucas Pereira; Brazil	Luis Lara; Colombia	Joan Lasso; Colombia
Men's 100 metres T53–T54	Leonardo Melo; Brazil	Gabriel Sosa; Argentina	Ariosvaldo Fernandes; Brazil
Men's 100 metres T64	Alan Fonteles; Brazil	Jesús Castillo; Peru	Wallison Fortes; Brazil
Men's 200 metres T35–T37	Henrique Nascimento; Brazil	Yeferson Suárez; Colombia	Maximiliano Villa; Argentina
Men's 200 metres T64	Wallison Fortes; Brazil	Jesús Castillo; Peru	Romildo Santos; Brazil
Men's 400 metres T11	Enderson Santos; Venezuela	Daniel Silva; Colombia	Cristián Giraldo; Brazil
Men's 400 metres T12–T13	Yamil Acosta; Colombia	Fernando Vázquez; Argentina	Samuel Souza; Brazil
Men's 400 metres T20	Samuel Guarín; Colombia	Luis Felipe Rodríguez; Venezuela	Samuel Conceição; Brazil
Men's 400 metres T35–T37–T38	Yeferson Suárez; Colombia	Leandro Viana; Brazil	Edson Pinheiro; Brazil
Men's 400 metres T47	Luis López; Venezuela	Luis Lara; Colombia	Steven Arboleda; Ecuador
Men's 400 metres T53–T54	Gabriel Sosa; Argentina	Leonardo Melo; Brazil	Javier Rojas; Colombia
Men's 800 metres T54	Leonardo Melo; Brazil	Juan Valladares; Venezuela	Javier Rojas; Colombia
Men's 1500 metres T11–T12	Jimmy Caicedo; Ecuador	Rosbil Guillén; Peru	Daniel Davrieux; Uruguay
Men's 1500 metres T20	Maycol Baño; Ecuador	Luis Paiva; Venezuela	Benjamín Concha; Chile
Men's 1500 metres T46	Mauricio Orrego; Chile	Not awarded	Not awarded
Men's 1500 metres T53–T54	Gabriel Sosa; Argentina	Juan Valladares; Venezuela	Not awarded
Men's 5000 metres T11–T12	Jimmy Caicedo; Ecuador	Sixto Moreta; Ecuador	Rosbil Guillén; Peru
Men's shot put F34	Mauricio Valencia; Colombia	Sebastián Poltrone; Argentina	Diego Meneses; Colombia
Men's shot put F37	Emanoel Souza; Brazil	João Victor Teixeira de Souza Silva; Brazil	Andrés Grisales; Colombia
Men's shot put F42–F61–F63	Nicolás Castro; Chile	Víctor Leal; Colombia	Carlos Felipa; Peru
Men's shot put F46	Abraham Ortega; Venezuela	Keneddy Mendoza; Venezuela	Not awarded
Men's shot put F54–F55	Wallace Santos; Brazil	Jackson Blanco; Venezuela	Francisco Cedeño; Panama
Men's shot put F56–F57	Pablo Giménez; Argentina	Marco Borges; Brazil	Henry Veliz; Venezuela
Men's shot put F11–F12	Ignacio Parodi; Argentina	Antonio Rodas; Argentina	Caio Pereira; Brazil
Men's discus throw F37	Edwars Varela; Venezuela	João Victor Teixeira de Souza Silva; Brazil	Andrés Grisales; Colombia
Men's discus throw F43–F44/F62–F63–F64	Romy Rodríguez; Venezuela	Carlos Felipa; Peru	Not awarded
Men's javelin throw F33–F34	Mauricio Valencia; Colombia	Diego Meneses; Colombia	Not awarded
Men's javelin throw F45–F46	Keneddy Mendoza; Venezuela	Abraham Ortega; Venezuela	Not awarded
Men's javelin throw F55–F57	Cícero Nobre; Brazil	Henry Veliz; Venezuela	Pablo Giménez; Argentina
Men's javelin throw F64	Romy Rodríguez; Venezuela	Not awarded	Not awarded
Men's long jump T13	Franco Pinetti; Argentina	Paulo Andrade; Brazil	Not awarded
Men's long jump T20	Jhon Obando; Colombia	Roberto Chala; Ecuador	Luis Felipe Rodríguez; Venezuela
Men's long jump T36	Rodrigo Silva; Brazil	Aser Ramos; Brazil	Sergio Markeviche; Argentina
Men's long jump T37–T38	Leandro Viana; Brazil	Mateus Evangelista; Brazil	Juan Gómez Coa; Colombia
Men's long jump T43–T44–T62–T64	Romildo Santos; Brazil	Tomás Soto; Colombia	Rafael Uribe; Venezuela
Men's long jump T47	Michel Deus; Brazil	Bruno dos Santos; Brazil	Alberto Piriz; Argentina
Women's 100 metres T11	Franyeli Vargas; Venezuela	Linda Pérez; Venezuela	Angie Pabón; Colombia
Women's 100 metres T12	Lorraine Aguiar; Brazil	Alejandra Pérez; Venezuela	Ketyla Teodoro; Brazil
Women's 100 metres T35	Anabel Polanco; Venezuela	Milagros Mostaffa; Argentina	Antonia Ortiz; Chile
Women's 100 metres T38	Angie Mejía; Colombia	Karen Palomeque; Colombia	Xiomara Saldarriaga; Colombia
Women's 100 metres T36–T37	Araceli Rotela; Argentina	Marcelly Pedroso; Brazil	Yescarly Medina; Venezuela
Women's 100 metres T45–T47	Kiara Rodríguez; Ecuador	Paola García; Venezuela	Lourdes Campero; Argentina
Women's 100 metres T54	Jessica Giacomelli; Brazil	Not awarded	Not awarded
Women's 200 metres T11	Sol Rojas; Venezuela	Franyeli Vargas; Venezuela	Linda Pérez; Venezuela
Women's 200 metres T12	Alejandra Pérez; Venezuela	Lorraine Aguiar; Brazil	Ketyla Teodoro; Brazil
Women's 200 metres T35	Anabel Polanco; Venezuela	Milagros Mostaffa; Argentina	Antonia Ortiz; Chile
Women's 200 metres T36–T37	Araceli Monserrat; Argentina	Yescarly Medina; Venezuela	Not awarded
Women's 200 metres T45–T47	Kiara Rodríguez; Ecuador	Lisbeli Vera; Venezuela	Paola García; Venezuela
Women's 400 metres T11	Angie Pabón; Colombia	Sol Rojas; Venezuela	Isadora Oliveira; Brazil
Women's 400 metres T12	Lorraine Aguiar; Brazil	Alejandra Pérez; Venezuela	Ketyla Teodoro; Brazil
Women's 400 metres T20	Leonela Vera; Venezuela	Alanny Santos; Brazil	Lizanshela Angulo; Ecuador
Women's 400 metres T37–T38	Karen Palomeque; Colombia	Angeluz Boyero; Venezuela	Not awarded
Women's 400 metres T45–T47	Lisbeli Vera; Venezuela	Amanda Cerna; Chile	María Jesús Lara; Chile
Women's 400 metres T54	Aline Rocha; Brazil	Vanessa de Souza; Brazil	Not awarded
Women's 800 metres T54	Aline Rocha; Brazil	Vanessa de Souza; Brazil	Jessica Giacomelli; Brazil
Women's shot put F11–F12	Izabela Campos; Brazil	Yesenia Restrepo; Colombia	Not awarded
Women's shot put F34	Wendis Mejías; Venezuela	Not awarded	Not awarded
Women's shot put F35–F37	Kelly Aponza; Colombia	Yomaira Cohen; Venezuela	Karen Tassi; Argentina
Women's shot put F41	Mayerli Buitrago; Colombia	Isabella Rubio; Chile	Not awarded
Women's shot put F45–F46	Suzana Nahirnei; Brazil	Patricia Rodríguez; Venezuela	Ashley Cheme; Ecuador
Women's shot put F55–F57	Caroline Baptista; Brazil	Julyana Cristina da Silva; Brazil	Roreidis Salinas; Venezuela
Women's discus throw F11	Izabela Campos; Brazil	Not awarded	Not awarded
Women's discus throw F37–F38	Xiomara Saldarriaga; Colombia	Yomaira Cohen; Venezuela	Kelly Aponza; Colombia
Women's discus throw F40–F41	Estefany López; Ecuador	Mayerli Buitrago; Colombia	Not awarded
Women's discus throw F56–F57	Yennifer Paredes; Colombia	Julyana Cristina da Silva; Brazil	Not awarded
Women's javelin throw F12–F13	Yasiris Escobar; Colombia	Not awarded	Not awarded
Women's javelin throw F33–F34	Wendis Mejías; Venezuela	Not awarded	Not awarded
Women's javelin throw F45–F46	Patricia Rodríguez; Venezuela	Naibys Morillo; Venezuela	Not awarded
Women's long jump T20	Jardênia Félix; Brazil	Lizanshela Angulo; Ecuador	Yester Ávila; Chile
Women's long jump T38	Angie Mejía; Colombia	Xiomara Saldarriaga; Colombia	Not awarded
Women's long jump T45–T47	Kiara Rodríguez; Ecuador	Paola García; Venezuela	Aldana Ibañez; Argentina
Mixed relay	Argentina; Alexis Chávez; Fernando Vázquez; Lourdes Campero; Lucia Montenegro	Venezuela; Enderson Santos; Juan Valladares; Lisbeli Vera; Yescarly Medina	Not awarded

=== Boccia ===
Event	Gold	Silver	Bronze
Men's individual BC1	Niel Castro; Peru	Mateo Kesting; Argentina	Juan Trejos; Colombia
Men's individual BC2	Javier Bastías; Chile	Iuri Tauan Silva; Brazil	Jonathan Aquino; Argentina
Men's individual BC3	Jesús Romero; Colombia	Gabriel Serafim; Brazil	Khalil Profiti; Argentina
Men's individual BC4	Edilson Chica; Colombia	César Quispe; Peru	Fermín Díaz; Argentina
Women's individual BC1	Ailén Flores; Argentina	Juana Salas; Colombia	Dayana Quiroz; Ecuador
Women's individual BC2	Clarice Sobreira; Brazil	Romina Benítez; Uruguay	Joselyn León; Ecuador
Women's individual BC3	Carina Ferrando; Argentina	Debora de Jesus; Brazil	Niurka Callupe; Peru
Women's individual BC4	Leidy Chica; Colombia	Alfonsina Urrejola; Chile	Joice Lira; Brazil
Mixed team BC1–BC2	Argentina; Mateo Durand; Jonatan Aquino; Ailén Flores	Brazil; Iuri Tauan Silva; Samuel Silva; Leila Alves	Colombia; Juan Trejos; Esteban Montaño; Juana Salas
Mixed pairs BC3	Colombia; Jesús Romero; Laura García	Argentina; Khalil Profiti; Carina Ferrando	Peru; Dean Acosta; Niurka Callupe
Mixed pairs BC4	Colombia; Edilson Chica; Leidy Chica	Brazil; Ivanildo Souza; Joice Lira	Chile; Ramón Parraguez; Alfonsina Urrejola

=== Football 5-a-side ===
Event	Gold	Silver	Bronze
Men's tournament	Brazil; Anael Oliveira; Cassio Lopes; Jardiel Soares; Maicon Junior; Paulo Vitor Pinheiro; Raimundo Nonato; Raynã Souza; Tiago Paraná	Argentina; Ángel Deldo; Braian Pereyra; Froilán Padilla; Jesús Merlos; Juan Oviedo; Maximiliano Espinillo; Nahuel Heredia; Osvaldo Fernández	Colombia; Alex Martínez; Didier Archila; Jesús López; Jhon Hernández; Jhon González; Juan Jaimes; Juan Pérez; Lino Coca

=== Goalball ===
Event	Gold	Silver	Bronze
Men's tournament	Brazil; Kauã Alves; Bryan Rodrigues; Icaro Almeida; Victor Sousa; André Saturnino; Fabio Junior	Argentina; Gabriel Zacarías; Lautaro Fernández; Rafael Britez; Leonado Jazmín; Oscar Mendez; Mario Velardez	Venezuela; Edwin Salazar; Carlos Linarez; Juan Carlos Cegaraa; Elver Montero; Jhonathan Rivas; Fernando Ferrer
Women's tournament	Brazil; Julia Tenorio; Emily Silva; Ana Simões; Carolina Marques; Aline Rodrigues; Amanda Braz	Peru; Nicole Ochavano; Esmeralda Cuellar; Adriana Gonzales; Jennifer Mamani; Dana Vidal; Diana Flores	Chile; Camila Contreras; Jennifer Yañez; Melany Olave; Edith Muñoz; Jimena Balboa; Yamilet Álvarez

=== Para-badminton ===
Event	Gold	Silver	Bronze
Men's singles WH1	Arthur Dias; Brazil	Víctor Aragón; Colombia	Michael Vargas; Peru
Men's singles WH2	Jaime Aránguiz; Chile	Victor Rocha; Brazil	Roberth Fajardo; Peru
Men's singles SL3	Alberto Puente; Peru	Gerson Vargas; Peru	Murilo Santos; Brazil
Men's singles SL4	Anthony Alvarado; Venezuela	Renzo Bances; Peru	Jorge Moreno; Colombia
Men's singles SU5	David Lima; Brazil	Jairo Aranguri; Peru	Kleiber Mijares; Venezuela
Women's singles WH1	Milani Gomes; Brazil	Maiara Almeida; Brazil	Not awarded
Women's singles WH2	Pilar Jáuregui; Peru	Leticia Sanches; Brazil	Not awarded
Women's singles SL3	Kauana Beckenkamp; Brazil	Diana León; Colombia	Not awarded
Women's singles SL4	Ana Carolina Reis; Brazil	Jenny Ventocilla; Peru	Melissa Lopes; Brazil
Women's singles SU5	Bruna Vasconcelos; Brazil	Kelly Escalante; Peru	Not awarded
Mixed singles SH6	Carmen Poveda; Peru	Nilton Quispe; Peru	Vinicius Costa; Brazil
Mixed doubles SL3–SU5	Brazil; David Lima; Kauana Beckenkamp	Peru; Renzo Bances; Jenny Ventocilla	Colombia; Jorge Moreno; Diana León

=== Para-cycling ===
Event	Gold	Silver	Bronze
Men's time trial B	Nelson Serna; Colombia	Maximiliano Pérez; Argentina	Matías Mansilla; Chile
Men's time trial C1–C3	Roberto Neto; Brazil	Esneider Muñoz; Colombia	Manuel Opazo; Chile
Men's time trial C4–C5	Lauro Chaman; Brazil	Diego Germán Dueñas; Colombia	Juan Andrés Gómez; Colombia
Men's time trial H1–H5	Eduardo Pimenta; Brazil	Oscar Biga; Argentina	Sebastián Morales; Chile
Men's road race B	Bruno Bonfim; Brazil	Nelson Serna; Colombia	Matías Mansilla; Chile
Men's road race C1–C3	Roberto Neto; Brazil	Esneider Muñoz; Colombia	Esteban Goddard; Panama
Men's road race C4–C5	Lauro Chaman; Brazil	Leandro Ambrossi; Argentina	Carlos Vargas; Colombia
Men's road race H3–H5	Richard Espinoza; Venezuela	Eduardo Pimenta; Brazil	Sebastián Morales; Chile
Women's time trial B	Viviane Soares; Brazil	Jerusa Geber dos Santos; Brazil	María José Quiroga; Argentina
Women's time trial C1–C3	Daniela Munévar; Colombia	Sabrina Custódia; Brazil	María Magdalena Sergo; Argentina
Women's time trial C4–C5	Paula Ossa; Colombia	Fabiana Ventura; Brazil	Iaydis Vega; Panama
Women's road race B	Viviane Soares; Brazil	Jerusa Geber dos Santos; Brazil	Nicol Baeza; Chile
Women's road race C1–C3	Daniela Munévar; Colombia	Sabrina Custódia; Brazil	María Magdalena Sergo; Argentina
Women's road race C4–C5	Paula Ossa; Colombia	Fabiana Ventura; Brazil	Iaydis Vega; Panama

=== Powerlifting ===
Event	Gold	Silver	Bronze
Men's 49 kg	Marco Túlio Cruz; Brazil	Jhonny Morales; Colombia	Jhonatan Montero; Venezuela
Men's 54 kg	Andrés Díaz; Venezuela	Carlos Yajue; Colombia	Diego Silva; Chile
Men's 59 kg	Juan Carlos Garrido; Chile	João Maria França; Brazil	Javier Jiménez; Chile
Men's 65 kg	Bryan Balanta; Colombia	Luciano Bezerra; Brazil	Not awarded
Men's 72 kg	Rey Dimas; Panama	Carlos Betancourt; Venezuela	Ezequiel Correa; Brazil
Men's 80 kg	Ailton Souza; Brazil	Matías Reveco; Chile	Francisco Palomeque; Colombia
Men's 88 kg	Huver Mondragón; Colombia	Victoriano Mendoza; Panama	Byron Bustos; Chile
Men's 97 kg	Fabio Torres; Colombia	Jose Lima; Brazil	Frank Feliu; Chile
Men's 107 kg	Mateus Silva; Brazil	Jean Rufino; Brazil	Matías Fenoy; Argentina
Men's +107 kg	Gustavo Melo; Brazil	Eglain Mena; Colombia	Matías Recabal; Chile
Women's 41 kg	Kerly Lascano; Ecuador	Lara Aparecida de Lima; Brazil	Cristina Poblador; Colombia
Women's 45 kg	María José Movilla; Colombia	Dilmary Oviedo; Venezuela	Brenda Souza; Brazil
Women's 50 kg	Clara Fuentes Monasterio; Venezuela	Maria Rizonaide da Silva; Brazil	Oriana Teran; Venezuela
Women's 55 kg	Camila Campos; Chile	Cristiane Reis; Brazil	Wiunawis Hernández; Venezuela
Women's 61 kg	Mishelle Oyague; Ecuador	Ana Gonçalves; Brazil	Nayadet Garces; Chile
Women's 67 kg	Maria de Fátima Castro; Brazil	Julie Grille; Chile	Estelia Ospina; Argentina
Women's 73 kg & 79 kg	Mariana D'Andrea; Brazil	Caroline Alves; Brazil	María Antonieta Ortiz; Chile
Women's 86 kg & +86 kg	Tayana Medeiros; Brazil	Marion Serrano; Chile	Edilandia Araujo; Brazil
Men's team	Colombia; Jhonny Morales; Bryan Balanta; Fabio Torres	Brazil; Gustavo Melo; Marco Túlio Cruz; João Maria França	Chile; Javier Jiménez; Juan Carlos Garrido; Jorge Carinao
Women's team	Brazil; Mariana D'Andrea; Tayana Medeiros; Lara Aparecida de Lima	Ecuador; Kerly Lascano; Mishelle Oyague; Rubby Andrade	Venezuela; Oriana Teran; Dilmary Oviedo; Clara Fuentes Monasterio
Mixed team	Brazil; Gustavo Melo; Marco Túlio Cruz; Maria de Fátima Castro	Chile; Juan Carlos Garrido; Jorge Carinao; Marion Serrano	Venezuela; Carlos Betancourt; Andrés Díaz; Clara Fuentes Monasterio

=== Sitting volleyball ===
Event	Gold	Silver	Bronze
Men's tournament	Brazil; Marciel Santana; Lucs Harada; Rodrigo Lima; Vinicius Lemos; Vitor Teixeira; Matheus Jesus; Fabiano Ferreira; Vinicius Silva; Renan Nogueira; Diego Souza; Isaac Felix; Thiago Rocha; Octavio Vicente; Paulo Santos	Colombia; Jorge Fajardo; Freddy Hernández; Didier Montoya; Yessi Mosquera; Cristán Pulgarin; Carlos Valencia; Jorge Mejía; Víctor Castillo; Edgar Sandoval; Diego Sanjuan; Brayan Castro; Jhonatan Fuentes; Atanasio Orrego	Argentina; Gaspar Buteler; Sergio Barreyra; Martín Irustia; Hugo Haffner; Javier Gandola; Juan Ferreyra; Francesco Quiroga; Nazareno Borgonovo; Hector Vargas; Diego Delgado; Bruno Palavecino; Roberto Díaz
Women's tournament	Brazil; Maria Clara Silva; Nurya Silva; Laiana Batista; Maria Luiza Leite; Maria Luciana Santos; Ana Luisa Soares; Camila Castro; Karoline Castro; Wilma Sousa; Ana Silva; Karoline Vigario; Monalisa Silva; Agnes Ribeiro	Peru; Pierina Palacios; Zoila Zuñiga; María Yanela Peralta; Edith Anccasi; María Beatriz Quispe; Luz Cruz; Julissa Nazario; Yaneth Sarmiento; Filomena Ramos; Rosa Durand; Rosa Espinoza; Liliana Flores	Argentina; Constanza Korch; Ana Bertello; Milagros Suárez; Yesica Rivadeneira; Griselda Colosia; Agustina Cardozo; Mariana Furlani; Marcela Picco; Guadalupe Morales; Rocío Sandoval

=== Swimming ===
Event	Gold	Silver	Bronze
Men's 50 metre freestyle S2–S3	Isaías Sono; Peru	Patricio Larenas; Chile	Alberto Abarza; Chile
Men's 50 metre freestyle S4	Ronystony Silva; Brazil	Nicolás Ricci; Argentina	Antonio Henríquez; Venezuela
Men's 50 metre freestyle S5	Tiago Ferreira; Brazil	Miguel Ángel Rincón; Colombia	Kevin Moreno; Colombia
Men's 50 metre freestyle S6	Nelson Crispín; Colombia	Santiago León; Colombia	David Rendón; Colombia
Men's 50 metre freestyle S7–S8	Carlos Serrano Zárate; Colombia	Lautaro Córdoba; Argentina	Juan Buitrago; Colombia
Men's 50 metre freestyle S9	Joaquín Leiva; Argentina	Lucas Mozela; Brazil	Mariano Lombardi; Argentina
Men's 50 metre freestyle S10	Nicolás Nieto; Argentina	Marthín Saavedra; Chile	Not awarded
Men's 50 metre freestyle S11	Wendell Belarmino Pereira; Brazil	Matheus Rheine; Brazil	Leider Lemus; Colombia
Men's 50 metre freestyle S12	Douglas Rocha; Brazil	Breno Braga; Brazil	Daniel Giraldo Correa; Colombia
Men's 100 metre freestyle S2–S3	Isaías Sono; Peru	Martín Villablanca; Chile	Patricio Larenas; Chile
Men's 100 metre freestyle S4–S5	Miguel Ángel Rincón; Colombia	Kevin Moreno; Colombia	Williams Mattamala; Chile
Men's 100 metre freestyle S6	Nelson Crispín; Colombia	Santiago León; Colombia	David Rendón; Colombia
Men's 100 metre freestyle S7	Carlos Serrano Zárate; Colombia	Iñaki Basiloff; Argentina	Matheus Brambilla; Brazil
Men's 100 metre freestyle S8	Lautaro Córdoba; Argentina	Juan Buitrago; Colombia	Yoices Henríquez; Venezuela
Men's 100 metre freestyle S8	Lautaro Córdoba; Argentina	Juan Buitrago; Colombia	Santiago Villota; Colombia
Men's 100 metre freestyle S9	Joaquín Leiva; Argentina	Mariano Lombardi; Argentina	Erick Tandazo; Ecuador
Men's 100 metre freestyle S10	Nicolás Nieto; Argentina	Cristhian Requena; Venezuela	Santiago Senestro; Argentina
Men's 100 metre freestyle S12	Douglas Matera; Brazil	Daniel Giraldo Correa; Colombia	Breno Braga; Brazil
Men's 100 metre freestyle S14	Agustín Pavez; Chile	Lautaro Maidana; Argentina	Elian Araya; Argentina
Men's 200 metre freestyle S2–S3	Isaías Sono; Peru	Martín Villablanca; Chile	Alberto Abarza; Chile
Men's 200 metre freestyle S4–S5	Miguel Ángel Rincón; Colombia	Kevin Moreno; Colombia	Williams Mattamala; Chile
Men's 200 metre freestyle S14	Lautaro Maidana; Argentina	Agustín Pavez; Chile	Andrés Finol; Venezuela
Men's 400 metre freestyle S6–S7	Iñaki Basiloff; Argentina	Carlos Serrano Zárate; Colombia	David Rendón; Colombia
Men's 400 metre freestyle S8–S9	Lautaro Córdoba; Argentina	Andrey Ribeiro; Brazil	Victor Almeida; Brazil
Men's 400 metre freestyle S10	Cristhian Requena; Venezuela	Not awarded	Not awarded
Men's 400 metre freestyle S11	Matheus Rheine; Brazil	José Luiz Perdigão; Brazil	Leider Lemus; Colombia
Men's 400 metre freestyle S12	Daniel Giraldo Correa; Colombia	Jimmy Barbosa; Colombia	Breno Costa; Brazil
Men's 400 metre freestyle S14	Agustín Pavez; Chile	Andrés Finol; Venezuela	Not awarded
Men's 50 metre backstroke S2–S3	Isaías Sono; Peru	Patricio Larenas; Chile	Martín Villablanca; Chile
Men's 50 metre backstroke S4	Ronystony Silva; Brazil	Nicolás Ricci; Argentina	Antonio Henríquez; Venezuela
Men's 50 metre backstroke S5	Kevin Moreno; Colombia	Diego Rivero; Argentina	Miguel Ángel Rincón; Colombia
Men's 100 metre backstroke S2	Alberto Abarza; Chile	Rodrigo Santillana; Peru	Not awarded
Men's 100 metre backstroke S6	Matías de Andrade; Argentina	Nelson Crispín; Colombia	Santiago León; Colombia
Men's 100 metre backstroke S7	Iñaki Basiloff; Argentina	Carlos Serrano Zárate; Colombia	Matheus Brambilla; Brazil
Men's 100 metre backstroke S8	Fernando Carlomagno; Argentina	Lautaro Córdoba; Argentina	Joan Suárez; Colombia
Men's 100 metre backstroke S9	Victor Almeida; Brazil	Joaquín Leiva; Argentina	Lucas Mozela; Brazil
Men's 100 metre backstroke S10	Matías de Andrade; Argentina	Nelson Crispín; Colombia	Santiago León; Colombia
Men's 100 metre backstroke S11	Leider Lemus; Colombia	Wendell Belarmino Pereira; Brazil	Daniel Mejía; Colombia
Men's 100 metre backstroke S12	Douglas Matera; Brazil	Daniel Giraldo Correa; Colombia	Jimmy Barbosa; Colombia
Men's 100 metre backstroke S14	Arthur Xavier Ribeiro; Brazil	Agustín Pavez; Chile	Lautaro Maidana; Argentina
Men's 50 metre breaststroke SB3	Ronystony Silva; Brazil	Nicolás Ricci; Argentina	Franco Gomez; Argentina
Men's 100 metre breaststroke SB4	Moisés Fuentes; Colombia	Diego Rivero; Argentina	Miguel Ángel Rincón; Colombia
Men's 100 metre breaststroke SB5–SB6	Nelson Crispín; Colombia	David Rendón; Colombia	Santiago León; Colombia
Men's 100 metre breaststroke SB7	Carlos Serrano Zárate; Colombia	Joan Suárez; Colombia	Fernando Carlomagno; Argentina
Men's 100 metre breaststroke SB8	Vicente Almonacid; Chile	Juan Felipe Castro; Colombia	Juan Manuel Buitrago; Colombia
Men's 100 metre breaststroke SB9	Lucas Mozela; Brazil	Santiago Senestro; Argentina	Bautista Costa; Argentina
Men's 100 metre breaststroke SB11	Leider Lemus; Colombia	Walter Piazza; Argentina	Brayan Triana; Colombia
Men's 100 metre breaststroke SB12	Daniel Giraldo Correa; Colombia	Jimmy Barbosa; Colombia	Not awarded
Men's 100 metre breaststroke SB14	João Pedro Brutos; Brazil	Elian Araya; Argentina	Arthur Xavier Ribeiro; Brazil
Men's 50 metre butterfly S2–S4	Antonio Henríquez; Venezuela	Patricio Arredondo; Chile	Mauricio Cobo; Paraguay
Men's 50 metre butterfly S5	Tiago Ferreira; Brazil	Miguel Ángel Rincón; Colombia	Not awarded
Men's 50 metre butterfly S6–S7	Carlos Serrano Zárate; Colombia	Santiago León; Colombia	Nelson Crispín; Colombia
Men's 100 metre butterfly S8	Lautaro Córdoba; Argentina	Yoices Henríquez; Venezuela	Juan Manuel Buitrago; Colombia
Men's 100 metre butterfly S9	Joaquín Leiva; Argentina	Victor Almeida; Brazil	Mariano Lombardi; Argentina
Men's 100 metre butterfly S10	Nicolás Nieto; Argentina	Cristhian Requena; Venezuela	Santiago Senestro; Argentina
Men's 100 metre butterfly S11	José Luiz Perdigão; Brazil	Leider Lemus; Colombia	Wendell Belarmino Pereira; Brazil
Men's 100 metre butterfly S12	Douglas Matera; Brazil	Breno Costa; Brazil	Daniel Giraldo Correa; Colombia
Men's 100 metre butterfly S14	Arthur Xavier Ribeiro; Brazil	Lautaro Maidana; Argentina	João Pedro Brutos; Brazil
Men's 150 metre medley SM4	Nicolás Ricci; Argentina	Patricio Arredondo; Chile	Antonio Henríquez; Venezuela
Men's 200 metre medley SM5–SM6–SM7	Carlos Serrano Zárate; Colombia	Iñaki Basiloff; Argentina	Germán Arévalo; Argentina
Men's 200 metre medley SM8	Vicente Almonacid; Chile	Fernando Carlomagno; Argentina	Juan Buitrago; Colombia
Men's 200 metre medley SM9	Joaquín Leiva; Argentina	Victor Almeida; Brazil	Lucas Mozela; Brazil
Men's 200 metre medley SM10	Santiago Senestro; Argentina	Cristhian Requena; Venezuela	Not awarded
Men's 200 metre medley SM11	Leider Lemus; Colombia	José Luiz Perdigão; Brazil	Brayan Triana; Colombia
Men's 200 metre medley SM12	Daniel Giraldo Correa; Colombia	Breno Braga; Brazil	Eduardo Muñoz; Chile
Men's 200 metre medley SM14	Arthur Xavier Ribeiro; Brazil	João Pedro Brutos; Brazil	Lautaro Maidana; Argentina
Women's 50 metre freestyle S4–S5–S6	Mariana Guerrero; Colombia	Ana Noriega; Argentina	Irene Nadaud; Chile
Women's 50 metre freestyle S7	Sara Vargas; Colombia	Isidora Donoso; Chile	Not awarded
Women's 50 metre freestyle S8	Cecília Jerônimo; Brazil	Vitória Ribeiro; Brazil	Camila Teixeira; Brazil
Women's 50 metre freestyle S9	Kiara Godoy; Chile	Dahiana Orellana; Argentina	Micaela Apaestegui; Peru
Women's 50 metre freestyle S10	María Barrera Zapata; Colombia	Not awarded	Not awarded
Women's 50 metre freestyle S11–S12	Leticia Mulling; Brazil	Manuela Herrero; Argentina	Belkis Mota; Venezuela
Women's 100 metre freestyle S3–S5	Ana Noriega; Argentina	Esthefany Rodrigues; Brazil	Edênia Garcia; Brazil
Women's 100 metre freestyle S6–S7	Sara Vargas; Colombia	Pamella Andrade; Brazil	Jenifer Rocha; Brazil
Women's 100 metre freestyle S8–S9	Micaela Apaestegui; Peru	Kiara Godoy; Chile	Nicol González; Colombia
Women's 100 metre freestyle S10	María Barrera Zapata; Colombia	Stephany Yilales; Venezuela	Not awarded
Women's 100 metre freestyle S11	Sharit Yunque; Colombia	Analuz Pellitero; Argentina	Nadia Báez; Argentina
Women's 100 metre freestyle S12	Leticia Mulling; Brazil	Manuela Herrero; Argentina	Belkis Mota; Venezuela
Women's 100 metre freestyle S14	Ana Karolina Soares; Brazil	Stephanie Souza; Brazil	Milagros Alonso; Argentina
Women's 200 metre freestyle S4–S5	Ana Noriega; Argentina	Esthefany Rodrigues; Brazil	Mariangela Lizcano; Venezuela
Women's 200 metre freestyle S14	Ana Karolina Soares; Brazil	Stephanie Souza; Brazil	Beatriz Carneiro; Brazil
Women's 400 metre freestyle S6–S7	Sara Vargas; Colombia	Pamella Andrade; Brazil	Mariana Guerrero; Colombia
Women's 400 metre freestyle S8	Cecília Jerônimo; Brazil	Camila Dias; Brazil	Laura González; Colombia
Women's 400 metre freestyle S9	Micaela Apaestegui; Peru	Genesis Leal; Venezuela	Laura Ladino; Colombia
Women's 400 metre freestyle S10	María Barrera Zapata; Colombia	Venezuela	Not awarded
Women's 400 metre freestyle S11	Sharit Yunque; Colombia	Analuz Pellitero; Argentina	Not awarded
Women's 400 metre freestyle S14	Milagros Alonso; Argentina	Viviana Moraes; Argentina	Valentina Gómez; Venezuela
Women's 100 metre breaststroke SB4–SB5	Mariana Guerrero; Colombia	Irene Nadaud; Chile	Dunia Felices; Peru
Women's 100 metre breaststroke SB6–SB7	Jenifer da Rocha; Brazil	Pamella Andrade; Brazil	Isidora Donoso; Chile
Women's 100 metre breaststroke SB8–SB9	Francisca Neiman; Chile	Samara Acevedo; Argentina	Ariana Salinas; Peru
Women's 100 metre breaststroke SB11	Nadia Báez; Argentina	Analuz Pellitero; Argentina	Michel Sabrina; Colombia
Women's 100 metre breaststroke SB12	Leticia Mulling; Brazil	Manuela Herrero; Argentina	Raquel Viel; Brazil
Women's 100 metre breaststroke SB14	Beatriz Carneiro; Brazil	Viviana Moraes; Venezuela	Isabella Fuentes; Colombia
Women's 50 metre backstroke S3–S4–S5	Ana Noriega; Argentina	Esthefany Rodrigues; Brazil	Edênia Garcia; Brazil
Women's 100 metre backstroke S8	Laura González; Colombia	Camila Teixeira; Brazil	Cecília Jerônimo; Brazil
Women's 100 metre backstroke S6	Sara Vargas; Colombia	Isidora Donoso; Chile	Mariana Guerrero; Colombia
Women's 100 metre backstroke S9	Micaela Apaestegui; Peru	Nicol González; Colombia	Laura Ladino; Colombia
Women's 100 metre backstroke S10	María Barrera Zapata; Colombia	Paula Ibarra; Argentina	Not awarded
Women's 100 metre backstroke S11	Analuz Pellitero; Argentina	Sharit Yunque; Colombia	Michel Sabrina; Colombia
Women's 100 metre backstroke S14	Ana Karolina Soares; Brazil	Stephanie Souza; Brazil	Beatriz Carneiro; Brazil
Women's 50 metre butterfly S4–S5	Esthefany Rodrigues; Brazil	Dunia Felices; Peru	Not awarded
Women's 50 metre butterfly S6–S7	Sara Vargas; Colombia	Pamella Andrade; Brazil	Isidora Donoso; Chile
Women's 100 metre butterfly S8	Vitória Ribeiro; Brazil	Laura González; Colombia	Not awarded
Women's 100 metre butterfly S9	Kiara Godoy; Chile	Nicol González; Colombia	Dahiana Orellana; Argentina
Women's 100 metre butterfly S10	María Barrera Zapata; Colombia	Not awarded	Not awarded
Women's 100 metre butterfly S11	Sharit Yunque; Colombia	Not awarded	Not awarded
Women's 100 metre butterfly S14	Ana Karolina Soares; Brazil	Stephanie Souza; Brazil	Beatriz Carneiro; Brazil
Women's 200 metre medley SM5–SM6	Mariana Guerrero; Colombia	Esthefany Rodrigues; Brazil	Irene Nadaud; Chile
Women's 200 metre medley SM7–SM8	Sara Vargas; Colombia	Laura González; Colombia	Rocío Gómez; Argentina
Women's 200 metre medley SM9	Nicol González; Colombia	Micaela Apaestegui; Peru	Kiara Godoy; Chile
Women's 200 metre medley SM10	Paula Ibarra; Argentina	Samara Acevedo; Argentina	Not awarded
Women's 200 metre medley SM11	Analuz Pellitero; Argentina	Sharit Yunque; Colombia	Nadia Báez; Argentina
Women's 200 metre medley SM14	Beatriz Carneiro; Brazil	Milagros Alonso; Argentina	Viviana Moraes; Venezuela
Mixed 4 × 50 metre freestyle relay 20 pts	Brazil; Tiago Ferreira; Ronystony Silva; Esthefany Rodrigues; Edênia Garcia	Chile; Alberto Abarza; Williams Mattamala; Irene Nadaud; Isidora Donoso	Not awarded
Mixed 4 × 100 metre freestyle relay 34 pts	Colombia; Carlos Serrano Zárate; Juan Castro; María Barrera Zapata; Sara Vargas	Brazil; Andrey Madeira; Victor Almeida; Camila Teixeira; Cecília Jerônimo	Argentina; Joaquín Leiva; Lautaro Córdoba; Dahiana Orellana; Rocío Gómez
Mixed 4 × 100 metre freestyle relay S14	Brazil; Arthur Xavier Ribeiro; João Pedro Brutos; Ana Karolina Soares; Stephanie Souza	Not awarded	Not awarded
Mixed 4 × 50 metre medley relay 20 pts	Argentina; Franco Gómez; Nicolás Ricci; Ana Noriega; Rocío Gómez	Chile; Alberto Abarza; Patricio Arredondo; Francisca Neiman; Irene Nadaud	Peru; José Manuel Silva; Isaías Sono; Dunia Felices; Micaela Apaestegui
Mixed 4 × 100 metre medley relay 34 pts	Brazil; Lucas Mozela; Victor Almeida; Cecília Jerônimo; Vitória Ribeiro	Colombia; Carlos Serrano Zárate; Juan Castro; María Barrera Zapata; Sara Vargas	Chile; Marthin Saavedra; Vicente Almonacid; Isidora Donoso; Kiara Godoy
Mixed 4 × 100 metre medley relay S14	Brazil; João Pedro Brutos; Arthur Xavier Ribeiro; Ana Karolina Soares; Stephanie Souza	Not awarded	Not awarded

=== Table tennis ===
Event	Gold	Silver	Bronze
Men's singles MS1–MS2	Luis Flores; Chile	Guilherme Marcião; Brazil	Not awarded
Men's singles MS3	Fábio Souza da Silva; Brazil	Roberto Quijada; Venezuela	Gabriel Copola; Argentina
Men's singles MS3	Fábio Souza da Silva; Brazil	Roberto Quijada; Venezuela	Luis Valencia; Colombia
Men's singles MS4–MS5	Carlos Moraes; Brazil	Elías Romero; Argentina	Maximiliano Rodríguez; Chile
Men's singles MS4–MS5	Carlos Moraes; Brazil	Elías Romero; Argentina	Arthur Branco; Brazil
Men's singles MS6–MS7	Luciano Khazandjian; Argentina	Ignacio Torres; Chile	José Luis Cerpa; Chile
Men's singles MS6–MS7	Luciano Khazandjian; Argentina	Ignacio Torres; Chile	José David Vargas; Colombia
Men's singles MS8	Andrés Beroiza; Chile	Luiz Manara; Brazil	Fausto Barrientos; Argentina
Men's singles MS8	Andrés Beroiza; Chile	Luiz Manara; Brazil	Jean Mashki; Brazil
Men's singles MS9–MS10	Manuel Echaveguren; Chile	Claudio Massad; Brazil	Lucas Carvalho; Brazil
Men's singles MS11	Thiago Simões Gomes; Brazil	Armin Rosas; Chile	Not awarded
Men's doubles MD4–MD8	Brazil; Fábio Souza da Silva; Carlos Moraes	Argentina; Elías Romero; Gabriel Copola	Colombia; Luis Valencia; Ramón Briceño
Men's doubles MD4–MD8	Brazil; Fábio Souza da Silva; Carlos Moraes	Argentina; Elías Romero; Gabriel Copola	Chile; Luis Flores; Maximiliano Rodríguez
Men's doubles MD14	Chile; José Luis Cerpa; Ignacio Torres	Colombia; José Vargas; Miguel Castro	Not awarded
Men's doubles MD18	Chile; Claudio Bahamondes; Manuel Echaveguren	Argentina; Eithan Skliarsky; Fausto Barrientos	Brazil; Jean Mashki; Claudio Massad
Men's doubles MD18	Chile; Claudio Bahamondes; Manuel Echaveguren	Argentina; Eithan Skliarsky; Fausto Barrientos	Colombia; Julián Chinchilla; Diego Jiménez
Women's singles WS1–WS2–WS3	Thais Severo; Brazil	Joyce de Oliveira; Brazil	Manuela Guzmán; Colombia
Women's singles WS1–WS2–WS3	Thais Severo; Brazil	Joyce de Oliveira; Brazil	Cátia Oliveira; Brazil
Women's singles WS4–WS5	Tamara Leonelli; Chile	Yoleidy Fernández; Venezuela	Nayla Kuell; Argentina
Women's singles WS6–WS7–WS8	Giselle Muñoz; Argentina	Aline Meneses; Brazil	Not awarded
Women's singles WS9–10	Jennyfer Marques Parinos; Brazil	Allana Maschio; Brazil	Ailyn Espinoza; Chile
Women's singles WS9–10	Jennyfer Marques Parinos; Brazil	Allana Maschio; Brazil	Yessica Álzate; Colombia
Women's doubles WD5–10	Brazil; Cátia Oliveira; Joyce de Oliveira	Colombia; Manuela Guzmán; Nelly Sánchez	Chile; Tamara Leonelli; Belén Fuentes
Women's doubles WD5–10	Brazil; Cátia Oliveira; Joyce de Oliveira	Colombia; Manuela Guzmán; Nelly Sánchez	Argentina; Constanza Garrone; Nayla Kuell
Women's doubles WD14–20	Chile; Ailyn Espinoza; Joseline Yevenes	Brazil; Allana Maschio; Jennyfer Marques Parinos	Colombia; Sara Orozco; Yessica Álzate
Mixed doubles XD4–7	Brazil; Fábio Souza da Silva; Thais Severo	Argentina; Elías Romero; Constanza Garrone	Brazil; Guilherme Marcião; Cátia Oliveira
Mixed doubles XD4–7	Brazil; Fábio Souza da Silva; Thais Severo	Argentina; Elías Romero; Constanza Garrone	Venezuela; Roberto Quijada; Yoleidy Fernández
Mixed doubles XD10	Brazil; Carlos Moraes; Joyce de Oliveira	Chile; Maximiliano Rodríguez; Tamara Leonelli	Not awarded
Mixed doubles XD14–20	Chile; Manuel Echaveguren; Joseline Yevenes	Brazil; Lucas Carvalho; Jennyfer Marques Parinos	Colombia; Álvaro Puerto; Yessica Álzate
Mixed doubles XD14–20	Chile; Manuel Echaveguren; Joseline Yevenes	Brazil; Lucas Carvalho; Jennyfer Marques Parinos	Brazil; Jean Mashki; Allana Maschio

=== Wheelchair basketball ===
Event	Gold	Silver	Bronze
Men's tournament	Colombia; Rodrigo Pérez; Oscar Restrepo; Juan Pablo Escobar; Luis Angulo; Johan Peña; Jhon Hernández; Federico López; Jhan Carlos Quintero; Daniel Díaz; Joymar Granados; Julián López; Jairo Lázaro	Argentina; Matías Mendez; Patricio Nuñez; Maximiliano Ruggeri; Carlos Esteche; Facundo Wingerter; Adolfo Berdun; Joel Gabas; Adrián Pérez; Lucas Muller; Martín Zito; Adriel Sánchez; Franco Alessandrini	Brazil; Marcos Silva; Dwan dos Santos; Anderson Ferreira; Dario Filho; Plinio Macedo; Eduardo Silva; Christian Ribeiro; Carlos Cassimiro; Sergio Junior; Cristiano Clemente; Norton Rodrigues; Joao Nascimento
Women's tournament	Brazil; Ana Kelvia de Lima; Brenda Bauer; Denise Eusebio; Gabriela Oliveira; Geisa Vieira; Ivanilde da Silva; Lia Soares; Maxcileide Ramos; Oara Uchoa; Paola Kloakler; Perla Assunção; Vileide Almeida	Argentina; Anahí Vera; Celeste Maldonado; Florencia Gonzalez; Jazmín Soria; Luciana Emilio; Luna Díaz; María Fernanda Pallares; María Luisa Chirinos; Mariana Pérez; Mariana Redi; Micaela Rosales; Silvia Linari	Colombia; Caren Barreto; Caren Dueñas; Francia Montes; Gladys Gómez; Leidy Gonzalez; Leidy Gomez; Lida Suaza; Liseth Álvarez; Meliss Quiroz; Mayibeth Rodríguez

=== Wheelchair tennis ===
Event	Gold	Silver	Bronze
Men's singles	Alexander Cataldo; Chile	Brayan Tapia; Chile	Gustavo Carneiro; Brazil
Men's doubles	Chile; Alexander Cataldo; Brayan Tapia	Brazil; Gustavo Carneiro; Diego Kohlrausch	Colombia; Diego Pirachicán; Manuel Sánchez
Women's singles	Macarena Cabrillana; Chile	Vitória Miranda; Brazil	Meirycoll Duval; Brazil
Women's doubles	Brazil; Meirycoll Duval; Vitória Miranda	Colombia; Paula Michelle Meza; Zuleinny Trujillo	Chile; Macarena Cabrillana; Gloria Llamín
Quad singles	Daniel Campaz; Colombia	Diego Pérez; Chile	Francisco Cayulef; Chile
Quad doubles	Chile; Francisco Cayulef; Diego Pérez	Colombia; Daniel Campaz; Albeiro Moreno	Peru; Diego Daniel Apaza; Martín Jesús Ordóñez
