= Maria de Fátima Castro =

Brazilian Paralympic powerlifter

Personal information
- Full name: Maria de Fátima Costa de Castro
- Born: 23 May 1994 (age 32) Tefé, Amazonas, Brazil

Sport
- Country: Brazil
- Sport: powerlifting
- Weight class: 61kg - 67kg
Medal record
Women's powerlifting
Representing Brazil
Summer Paralympics
Bronze medal – third place	2024 Paris	–67 kg
World Championships
Silver medal – second place	2023 Dubai	Team
Parapan American Games
Bronze medal – third place	2023 Santiago	–67 kg
South American Para Games
Gold medal – first place	2026 Valledupar	67 kg
Gold medal – first place	2026 Valledupar	Mixed team

Maria de Fátima Costa de Castro (born 23 May 1994) is a Brazilian powerlifter who has competed in the 61 kilograms (134 lb) and 67 kilograms (148 lb) brackets. She is a silver medalist at the 2023 World Para Powerlifting Championships, and bronze medalist at the 2023 Parapan American Games and 2024 Summer Paralympics.

== Early life ==
Maria de Fátima Costa de Castro was born in Manaus, Amazonas, Brazil, on 23 May 1994. She had been diagnosed with congenital malformation in her legs. In 2017, she had discovered weightlifting and decided to take up the sport two years later.

== Career ==
Castro competed at the 2023 World Para Powerlifting Championships in the 67kg and women's team events, winning the latter as part of the Brazilian team. She then competed at the 2023 Parapan American Games, where she won the bronze medal in her event, finishing behind Bertha Fernández and Amalia Pérez. Making her Paralympic debut at the 2024 Summer Paralympics, she competed in the –67 kg category, where she won the bronze medal.
